= 2016 Emporia State Hornets football team =

American college football season

2016 Emporia State Hornets football

NCAA Division II Second Round, L 13–44 at Northwest Missouri State
- Conference: Mid-America Intercollegiate Athletics Association

Ranking
- Coaches: No. 10
- Record: 11–2 (10–1 MIAA)
- Head coach: Garin Higgins (10th season)
- Offensive coordinator: Matt Nardo (2nd season)
- Defensive coordinator: Mike LoPorto (3rd season)
- Co-defensive coordinator: Bryan Nardo (5th season)
- Captains: Mitchell Foote; Landon Nault; Kole Schankie; Eddie Vinson
- Home stadium: Francis G. Welch Stadium

2016 Mid-America Intercollegiate Athletics Association football standings
| | Conf. | | | Overall |
| Team | W | | L | W | | L |
|---|---|---|---|---|---|---|
| No. 1 NW Missouri State $^ | 11 | – | 0 | 15 | – | 0 |
| No. 10 Emporia State ^ | 10 | – | 1 | 11 | – | 2 |
| No. 21 Central Missouri ^ | 9 | – | 2 | 9 | – | 3 |
| Fort Hays State # | 7 | – | 4 | 8 | – | 4 |
| Pittsburg State | 7 | – | 4 | 7 | – | 4 |
| Washburn # | 7 | – | 4 | 7 | – | 5 |
| Missouri Western | 4 | – | 7 | 4 | – | 7 |
| Central Oklahoma | 3 | – | 8 | 3 | – | 8 |
| Lindenwood | 3 | – | 8 | 3 | – | 8 |
| Missouri Southern | 2 | – | 9 | 2 | – | 9 |
| Northeastern State | 2 | – | 9 | 2 | – | 9 |
| Nebraska–Kearney | 1 | – | 10 | 1 | – | 10 |
$ – Conference champion; ^ – NCAA Division II playoff participant; # – bowl participant (Wahsburn: Mineral Water Bowl, Fort Hays State: C.H.A.M.P.S. Heart of Texas Bowl; Rankings from AFCA poll)

The 2016 Emporia State Hornets football team represented Emporia State University in the 2016 NCAA Division II football season. The Hornets played their home games on the newly-renovated Jones Field at Francis G. Welch Stadium in Emporia, Kansas, as they have done since 1937. 2016 was the 119th season in school history. The Hornets were led by head coach Garin Higgins, finished his 15th overall season, and 10th overall at Emporia State. Emporia State has a member of the Mid-America Intercollegiate Athletics Association since 1991.

== Schedule ==
| Date | Time | Opponent | Rank | Site | Result | Attendance |
|---|---|---|---|---|---|---|
| September 1 | 7:00 p.m. | No. 1 Northwest Missouri State | No. 24 | Francis G. Welch Stadium; Emporia, KS | L 14–41 | 6,821 |
| September 8 | 7:00 p.m. | at Nebraska–Kearney | | Ron & Carol Cope Stadium; Kearney, NE | W 34–7 | 4,663 |
| September 17 | 2:00 p.m. | Missouri Southern | | Francis G. Welch Stadium; Emporia, KS (Traditions Day) | W 49–21 | 5,304 |
| September 24 | 1:00 p.m. | at No. 13 Central Missouri | | Audrey J. Walton Stadium; Warrensburg, MO | W 37–31 ^{3OT} | 7,995 |
| October 1 | 2:00 p.m. | Central Oklahoma | No. 23 | Francis G. Welch Stadium; Emporia, KS | W 35–21 | 4,987 |
| October 8 | 2:00 p.m. | at Northeastern State | No. 18 | Doc Wadley Stadium; Tahlequah, OK | W 47–27 | 1,503 |
| October 15 | 2:00 p.m. | Lindenwood^{†} | No. 12 | Francis G. Welch Stadium; Emporia, KS | W 35–28 | 6,014 |
| October 22 | 2:00 p.m. | at Pittsburg State | No. 12 | Carnie Smith Stadium; Pittsburg, KS | W 41–36 | 8,763 |
| October 29 | 2:00 p.m. | Fort Hays State | No. 10 | Francis G. Welch Stadium; Emporia, KS | W 24–16 | 6,103 |
| November 5 | 1:00 p.m. | at Missouri Western | No. 9 | Spratt Stadium; St. Joseph, MO | W 27–14 | 4,017 |
| November 12 | 1:00 p.m. | at Washburn | No. 9 | Yager Stadium at Moore Bowl; Topeka, KS (rivalry) | W 30–3 | 6,789 |
| November 19 | 1:00 p.m. | No. 13 Minnesota–Duluth* | No. 9 | Francis G. Welch Stadium; Emporia, KS (NCAA Division II First Round) | W 59–26 | 5,014 |
| November 26 | 1:00 p.m. | No. 1 Northwest Missouri State* | No. 9 | Bearcat Stadium; Maryville, MO (NCAA Division II Second Round) | L 13–44 | 5,119 |
*Non-conference game; ^{†}Homecoming; Rankings from AFCA Poll released prior to the game; All times are in Central time

== Preseason ==
The Hornets entereded the 2016 season after finishing with an 11–3 overalla and 9–2 in conference play the previous season under Higgins. On August 2, 2016 at the MIAA Football Media Day, the Hornets were chosen to finish tied for third place in the Coaches Poll, and fourth in the Media Poll.

Sporting News released their Top-25 on May 25, 2016, landing Emporia State at No. 24. On June 15, 2016, Lindy's NCAA Division II Preseason Top 25 released its poll, ranking Emporia State at #12.

On August 15, the American Football Coaches Association released the Preseason Division II Poll, landing Emporia State at #24.

On August 22, D2football.com released its Top 25 poll, ranking Emporia State 12th.

== Game summaries ==
=== Northwest Missouri State ===
Northwest Missouri State at Emporia State

| Team | 1 | 2 | 3 | 4 | Total |
|---|---|---|---|---|---|
| • #1 Northwest Missouri State | 3 | 17 | 14 | 7 | 41 |
| #24 Emporia State | 7 | 0 | 0 | 7 | 14 |

- Date: September 1
- Location: Welch Stadium, Emporia, KS
- Game start: 7:00 pm CDT
- Elapsed time: 2:59
- Game attendance: 6,821
- Game weather: Sunny, 75 °F (24 °C)
- Referee: Craig Helser

=== Nebraska–Kearney ===
Emporia State at Nebraska–Kearney

| Team | 1 | 2 | 3 | 4 | Total |
|---|---|---|---|---|---|
| • Emporia State | 3 | 14 | 10 | 7 | 34 |
| Nebraska–Kearney | 0 | 0 | 0 | 7 | 7 |

- Date: September 8
- Location: Cope Stadium, Kearney, NE
- Game start: 7:00 pm CDT
- Elapsed time: 3:13
- Game attendance: 4,663
- Game weather: Breezy, 79 °F (26 °C)
- Referee: Lonnie Brickman

=== Missouri Southern ===
Missouri Southern at Emporia State

| Team | 1 | 2 | 3 | 4 | Total |
|---|---|---|---|---|---|
| Missouri Southern | 0 | 7 | 7 | 7 | 21 |
| • Emporia State | 28 | 14 | 7 | 0 | 49 |

- Date: September 17
- Location: Welch Stadium, Emporia, KS
- Game start: 2:00 pm CDT
- Elapsed time: 2:57
- Game attendance: 5,304
- Game weather: Sunny, 77 °F (25 °C)
- Referee: John Adams

=== Central Missouri ===
Emporia State at Central Missouri

| Team | 1 | 2 | 3 | 4 | OT | 2OT | Total |
|---|---|---|---|---|---|---|---|
| • Emporia State | 7 | 3 | 7 | 7 | 7 | 6 | 37 |
| #13 Central Missouri | 0 | 7 | 0 | 17 | 7 | 0 | 31 |

- Date: September 24
- Location: Walton Stadium, Warrensburg, MO
- Game start: 1:00 pm CDT
- Elapsed time: 3:40
- Game attendance: 7,995
- Game weather: Sunny, 80 °F (27 °C)
- Referee: John Steiger

=== Central Oklahoma ===
Central Oklahoma at Emporia State

| Team | 1 | 2 | 3 | 4 | Total |
|---|---|---|---|---|---|
| Central Oklahoma | 0 | 0 | 10 | 11 | 21 |
| • #23 Emporia State | 7 | 14 | 7 | 7 | 35 |

- Date: October 1
- Location: Welch Stadium, Emporia, KS
- Game start: 2:00 pm CDT
- Elapsed time: 3:05
- Game attendance: 4,987
- Game weather: Sunny, 72 °F (22 °C)
- Referee: Craig Helser

=== Northeastern State ===
Emporia State at Northeastern State

| Team | 1 | 2 | 3 | 4 | Total |
|---|---|---|---|---|---|
| • #18 Emporia State | 16 | 14 | 10 | 7 | 47 |
| Northeastern State | 13 | 7 | 0 | 7 | 27 |

- Date: October 8
- Location: Wadley Stadium, Tahlequah, OK
- Game start: 2:00 pm CDT
- Elapsed time: 3:13
- Game attendance: 1,503
- Game weather: Sunny, 73 °F (23 °C)
- Referee: John Adams

=== Lindenwood ===
Lindenwood at Emporia State

| Team | 1 | 2 | 3 | 4 | Total |
|---|---|---|---|---|---|
| Lindenwood | 0 | 7 | 7 | 14 | 28 |
| • #12 Emporia State | 0 | 0 | 14 | 21 | 35 |

- Date: October 15
- Location: Welch Stadium, Emporia, KS
- Game start: 2:00 pm CDT
- Elapsed time: 3:12
- Game attendance: 6,014
- Game weather: Overcast, 72 °F (22 °C)
- Referee: Danny Harris

=== Pittsburg State ===
Emporia State at Pittsburg State

| Team | 1 | 2 | 3 | 4 | Total |
|---|---|---|---|---|---|
| • #12 Emporia State | 14 | 17 | 0 | 10 | 41 |
| Pittsburg State | 17 | 7 | 0 | 12 | 36 |

- Date: October 22
- Location: Carnie Smith Stadium, Pittsburg, KS
- Game start: 2:00 pm CDT
- Elapsed time: 3:29
- Game attendance: 8,763
- Game weather: Clear, 73 °F (23 °C)
- Referee: Craig Helser

=== Fort Hays State ===
Fort Hays State at Emporia State

| Team | 1 | 2 | 3 | 4 | Total |
|---|---|---|---|---|---|
| Fort Hays State | 3 | 0 | 0 | 13 | 16 |
| • #10 Emporia State | 7 | 0 | 7 | 10 | 24 |

- Date: October 29
- Location: Welch Stadium, Emporia, KS
- Game start: 2:00 pm CDT
- Elapsed time: 2:54
- Game attendance: 6,103
- Game weather: Mostly sunny, 81 °F (27 °C)
- Referee: Dwight Neibling

=== Missouri Western ===
Emporia State at Missouri Western

| Team | 1 | 2 | 3 | 4 | Total |
|---|---|---|---|---|---|
| • #9 Emporia State | 3 | 7 | 0 | 17 | 27 |
| Missouri Western | 7 | 7 | 0 | 0 | 14 |

- Date: November 5
- Location: Spratt Stadium, St. Joseph, MO
- Game start: 1:00 pm CDT
- Elapsed time: 2:48
- Game attendance: 4,017
- Game weather: Slight overcast, 70 °F (21 °C)
- Referee: Sean Johnston

=== Washburn ===
Emporia State at Washburn

| Team | 1 | 2 | 3 | 4 | Total |
|---|---|---|---|---|---|
| • #9 Emporia State | 0 | 17 | 7 | 6 | 30 |
| Washburn | 0 | 3 | 0 | 0 | 3 |

- Date: November 12
- Location: Yager Stadium, Topeka, KS
- Game start: 1:00 pm CST
- Elapsed time: 2:53
- Game attendance: 6,789
- Game weather: Clear and sunny, 58 °F (14 °C)
- Referee: Craig Helser

=== Minnesota–Duluth—NCAA Division II First Round ===
Minnesota–Duluth at Emporia State

| Team | 1 | 2 | 3 | 4 | Total |
|---|---|---|---|---|---|
| #13 Minnesota–Duluth | 13 | 7 | 6 | 0 | 26 |
| • #9 Emporia State | 14 | 14 | 14 | 17 | 59 |

- Date: November 19
- Location: Francis G. Welch Stadium, Emporia, KS
- Game start: 1:00 pm CST
- Elapsed time: 3:01
- Game attendance: 5,014
- Game weather: Sunny and cool, 46 °F (8 °C)
- Referee: Abram Anaya

For the first time in school history, Emporia State was selected to host an NCAA postseason football game.

=== Northwest Missouri State—NCAA Division II Second Round ===
Northwest Missouri State at Emporia State

| Team | 1 | 2 | 3 | 4 | Total |
|---|---|---|---|---|---|
| #9 Emporia State | 0 | 13 | 0 | 0 | 13 |
| • #1 Northwest Missouri State | 17 | 14 | 3 | 10 | 44 |

- Date: November 26
- Location: Bearcat Stadium, Maryville, MO
- Game start: 1:00 pm CST
- Elapsed time: 2:50
- Game attendance: 5,119
- Game weather: Sunny and clear, 51 °F (11 °C)
- Referee: Craig Hesler

== Personnel ==
=== Coaching staff ===
Along with Higgins, there were 10 assistants.

| Name | Position | Seasons at ESU | Alma mater |
|---|---|---|---|
| Garin Higgins | Head coach | 10 | Emporia State (1992) |
| Mike LoPorto | Co-defensive coordinator/defensive line coach | 9 | Emporia State (2007) |
| Bryan Nardo | Co-defensive coordinator/linebackers Coach | 5 | Ohio (2008) |
| Matt Nardo | Off. coordinator/recruiting Coord./Inside & H-backs/Receivers coach | 2 | Ohio (2005) |
| Nathan Linsey | Secondary/special teams coordinator | 5 | Emporia State (2010) |
| Justin Wieser | Running backs/Strength and Conditioning | 4 | Emporia State (2010) |
| Tony Koehling | Offensive line coach | 2 | Ohio (2013) |
| Terence Coleman | Outside Receivers | 4 | Northwestern Oklahoma State (2000) |
| Daniel Goodman | Graduate Assistant – Tight ends coach | 2 | Emporia State (2014) |
| Antwan Crutcher | Graduate Assistant – Defensive line | 1 | Ohio (2015) |
| Daniel Siehndel | Graduate Assistant – Defensive backs | 1 | Southeast Missouri State (2015) |

=== Roster ===
2016 Emporia State Hornets football team roster
Players
Coaches
Offense

| Pos. | # | Name | Class |
|---|---|---|---|
| WR | 2 | Morris Williams II | Jr |
| QB | 4 | Jaylen Lowe | Jr |
| WR | 5 | Justin Brown | So |
| WR | 6 | Louis Dailey | Jr |
| WR | 8 | Mitchell Foote | Sr |
| RB | 9 | Kai Callins | So |
| WR | 10 | Jaylon Radel | Jr |
| QB | 12 | T'Quan Wallace | Fr |
| WR | 13 | Brent Davenport | So |
| QB | 14 | Braxton Marstall | So |
| RB | 23 | Antonio Brown | Sr |
| RB | 24 | Denzel Strong | Sr |
| RB | 25 | Ricky Van Weezel | Fr |
| RB | 26 | Landon Nault | So |
| RB | 30 | Trenton Rietzke | Fr |
| RB | 34 | Brett Osbern | Fr |
| WR | 35 | Malcom Dade | Fr |
| WR | 36 | Anthony McGee | So |
| RB | 37 | J.J. Rivers | Fr |
| RB | 39 | Brock Squier | Sr |
| H | 43 | Luke Berblinger | Fr |
| H | 44 | Nick Oliver | So |
| H | 45 | Reese Richards | Sr |
| OL | 53 | Jake Warehime | Jr |
| OL | 62 | Cole Cruz | Jr |
| OL | 63 | Brance Watts | Fr |
| OL | 64 | Jarrett Stastny | Sr |
| OL | 66 | Nick Vega | Sr |
| OL | 67 | Dylan Gall | Jr |
| OL | 68 | Carter Pemridge | Fr |
| OL | 69 | Joe Pomatto | Jr |
| OL | 70 | Andrew Lillich | So |
| OL | 71 | Zack Fasbender | So |
| OL | 72 | Dave Radel | Jr |
| OL | 74 | Thomas O'Grady | Jr |
| OL | 75 | Estevan Arana | Fr |
| OL | 76 | Austin Unterreiner | Fr |
| OL | 77 | DeAndre Herron | Sr |
| OL | 78 | Braden Janzen | So |
| OL | 79 | Tyler Banta | Fr |
| H | 80 | Trenton Ball | So |
| WR | 81 | Kirvin Parks | Fr |
| WR | 82 | Anthony Buffalomeat | Sr |
| WR | 83 | Jordan Jackson | So |
| WR | 84 | Ramsey Stramel | Jr |
| WR | 85 | Seth Surface | Fr |
| WR | 86 | Sean Talley | Fr |
| WR | 87 | Carson Profitt | So |
| WR | 88 | Jordan Reed | So |

Defense

| Pos. | # | Name | Class |
|---|---|---|---|
| DB | 1 | Marcus Houghton | Jr |
| DB | 3 | DeAndre Glover | Sr |
| LB | 7 | Gabe Cleveland | Jr |
| DB | 11 | M.J. Mathis | Sr |
| LB | 16 | Ty McKenzie | So |
| LB | 17 | Orlando Sheets | So |
| DB | 18 | J.P. Lohrentz | Sr |
| DB | 19 | Dillon Lohr | Fr |
| LB | 20 | Jarett Strode | Sr |
| DB | 21 | Josh Monteagudo | Sr |
| DB | 22 | Roscoe Gatewood | Fr |
| DB | 27 | Gary Woods II | Fr |
| DB | 28 | A.J. West | Jr |
| DB | 29 | Curtis Shorts | Sr |
| LB | 31 | Remington Whitley | Jr |
| DB | 32 | Max Wariboko | Fr |
| DB | 33 | Drew Cook | So |
| LB | 38 | Kole Schankie | Sr |
| LB | 41 | Jarron Montgomery | Sr |
| DB | 42 | Trey Dickerson | Sr |
| DB | 46 | Ferrando Joseph | Jr |
| LB | 50 | Brandon Goodman | Sr |
| LB | 51 | Darric Cashier | So |
| DE | 52 | Donovan Walker | Jr |
| DE | 54 | Logan Powell | So |
| DE | 55 | Patrick Dugan | Jr |
| LB | 56 | Logan Thompson | Jr |
| LB | 57 | Luke Meyer | Fr |
| LB | 58 | Immanuel McDown | So |
| LB | 59 | Jace Bass | Fr |
| DE | 60 | Collin Frickey | Jr |
| DE | 61 | Paul Foster | So |
| DL | 65 | Ryan Smith | So |
| DE | 73 | Camren Proby | Fr |
| DE | 90 | Parker Bass | So |
| DL | 91 | Eddie Vinson | Sr |
| DE | 94 | Ugonna Nwarie | Jr |
| DE | 95 | Tre'Vaun Ammons | Fr |
| DL | 97 | Tim Giddings | Fr |
| DE | 98 | Jackson Maase | Fr |
| DT | 99 | Larenze Abston | Sr |

Special teams

| Pos. | # | Name | Class |
|---|---|---|---|
| K | 40 | Dakota Weaver | Jr |
| LS | 48 | Reid Buckingham | Jr |
| K | 49 | Justin Marcha | Jr |
| P | 89 | Riley O'Neal | Fr |
| K | 92 | Austin Motron | Jr |

Head coach

- Garin Higgins

Coordinators/assistant coaches

- See #Coaching staff

Legend

- (C) Team captain
- (S) Suspended
- (I) Ineligible
- Injured
- Redshirt

Roster
Last update: August 3, 2016
