= 2016 Nebraska–Kearney Lopers football team =

American college football season

2016 Nebraska–Kearney Lopers football
- Conference: Mid-America Intercollegiate Athletics Association
- Record: 1–10 (1–10 MIAA)
- Head coach: Josh Lamberson (2nd season)
- Offensive coordinator: Kevin Bleil (2nd season)
- Defensive coordinator: Ken Gordon (2nd season)
- Home stadium: Ron & Carol Cope Stadium

2016 Mid-America Intercollegiate Athletics Association football standings
	Conf.			Overall
Team	W		L	W		L
No. 1 NW Missouri State $^	11	–	0	15	–	0
No. 10 Emporia State ^	10	–	1	11	–	2
No. 21 Central Missouri ^	9	–	2	9	–	3
Fort Hays State #	7	–	4	8	–	4
Pittsburg State	7	–	4	7	–	4
Washburn #	7	–	4	7	–	5
Missouri Western	4	–	7	4	–	7
Central Oklahoma	3	–	8	3	–	8
Lindenwood	3	–	8	3	–	8
Missouri Southern	2	–	9	2	–	9
Northeastern State	2	–	9	2	–	9
Nebraska–Kearney	1	–	10	1	–	10
$ – Conference champion; ^ – NCAA Division II playoff participant; # – bowl participant (Wahsburn: Mineral Water Bowl, Fort Hays State: C.H.A.M.P.S. Heart of Texas Bowl; Rankings from AFCA poll)

The 2016 Nebraska–Kearney Lopers football team represented the University of Nebraska at Kearney in the 2016 NCAA Division II football season. The Lopers played their home games on Foster Field in Ron & Carol Cope Stadium in Kearney, Nebraska, as they have done since 1939. 2016 was the 111th season in school history. The Lopers were led by second-year head coach, Josh Lamberson. Nebraska–Kearney has been a member of the Mid-America Intercollegiate Athletics Association since 2012.

== Preseason ==
The Lopers entered the 2016 season after finishing with a 0–11 record overall and in conference play, under Lamberson. On August 2, 2016, at the MIAA Football Media Day, the Lopers were chosen to finish in 11th place in the Coaches Poll and 12th place in the Media Poll.

== Personnel ==
=== Coaching staff ===
Along with Lamberson, there were 13 assistants.

Name	Position	Seasons at UNK	Alma Mater
Josh Lamberson	Head coach/QB's	2	Northwest Missouri State (2005)
Ken Gordon	Assoc. Head Coach – Defensive Coord./Backs	2	Northwest Missouri State (1996)
Kevin Bleil	Assist. Head Coach – Co-Offensive Coord./Passing Game Coord./TE	2	Akron (2010)
Joe Holtzclaw	Assist. Head Coach – Co-Offensive Coord./Running Game Coord./Offensive Line	2	Northwest Missouri State (2007)
Matt Miller	Assist. Head Coach – Wide Receivers	2	Arizona State (2006)
Shayne Shade	Assist. Head Coach – Defensive Line	2	Northwest Missouri State (2011)
Jake Willrich	Assist. Head Coach – Line Backers/Special Teams	2	Truman (2003)
Michael Gruber	Assist. Head Coach – Specialists	1	Nebraska–Kearney (2014)
Mark Newmyer	Graduate Assistant	2	Doane (2008)
Aaron Terry	Graduate Assistant	2	Northwest Missouri State (2013)
Bronson Marsh	Graduate Assistant	2	Nebraska–Kearney (2016)
Creighton Reed	Student Assistant Coach	2	current student at UNK
Spencer Dorn	Student Assistant Coach	1	current student at UNK
Joe Kripp	Strength & Conditioning	2	Eastern Illinois (2013)

=== Roster ===
2016 Nebraska–Kearney Lopers football team roster
Players
Coaches
Offense

Pos.	#	Name	Class
RB	1	Luke Quinn	So
WR	3	Preston Foley	Sr
QB	7	Justin Roberts	Fr
QB	8	Alex McGinnis	Fr
WR	10	D'Andre Hood	Fr
QB	11	Stephen Worthing	Fr
QB	12	Ryan McFarlin	Fr
QB	13	John Masker	Fr
TE	16	Julian Navarrette	Sr
WR	18	Malcom Moore	Jr
RB	25	Thomas Russell	Fr
ATH	29	Lorenz Allen	Fr
RB	32	Martiez Prather	Fr
WR	33	LaDarrius Thomas	So
TE	35	Tanner Lusk	Fr
OT	48	Alex Harms	So
OL	50	Bailey Haas	Fr
OL	51	Matt Caesar	Fr
OL	52	Lucas Troyer	Fr
OL	53	Jake Filsinger	Jr
OL	59	Jacob Runge	Sr
OL	60	Jack McLeay	Fr
OL	61	Jacob Browne	Fr
OL	62	Josh Stoltenberg	Fr
OL	63	Zach Beard	Sr
OL	64	Broden Baker	Fr
OL	65	Sunday Beng	Fr
OL	66	Taylor Angele	Fr
OL	67	Daniel Yoshiki	So
OL	68	Cam Collins	Fr
OL	69	Kyle Crooks	Fr
OL	70	Nick Brungardt	Fr
OL	71	Luke Browne	Sr
OL	72	Corey Hoelck	Fr
OL	73	Leo Wilson	So
OL	74	Nick Wenz	Sr
OL	75	David Squiers	So
OL	77	Kolin Kenton	Fr
OL	78	Troy Studd	Sr
OL	79	Austyn Franks	Fr
WR	80	Jack Lydiatt	So
WR	81	Kentrez Bell	Fr
WR	82	Barry Moore	Fr
OT	83	Sam Brauer	Jr
TE	84	Conner Beard	Sr
WR	85	Austan Daniels	Fr
TE	86	A.J. Schulze	Fr
TE	87	Matt Kostenbauer	Fr
TE	88	Alec Sovereign	Fr
WR	89	Logan Anderjaska	Fr

Defense

Pos.	#	Name	Class
DB	2	Dallas Vaughn	Fr
CB	4	Antwan Hadley	Sr
CB	6	Famous McKinnon	So
CB	9	Darian Thomas	Sr
LB	14	Andrew Jensen	Sr
FS	15	Zach Sullivan	Fr
DB	17	Jimmy Hawk	Jr
DL	19	Romeo Bryant	Jr
DB	20	Irahan Avila	Jr
LB	21	D.J. Curtis	Fr
DB	22	Justin James	Jr
DB	23	Davion Tyler	Fr
DB	24	Cameron Winston	Jr
DB	26	Randon Moore	Fr
LB	28	Rakid Hill	Fr
FS	30	George Brown	Jr
CB	31	Quinza Witcher	So
DB	34	Max Raymond	So
LB	37	Sal Silvo	Fr
LB	38	Kevin Gallardo-Franklin	Fr
DL	39	Tyson Libengood	Fr
LB	40	Tyke Kozeal	Sr
LB	41	Garrett Popper	So
LB	42	Will Lansman	Fr
DL	43	Gavin Leach	Jr
LB	44	Ty Botsford	Fr
LB	45	Travis Holcomb	Fr
DL	46	Justin Growel	Fr
LB	47	Trey Anderson	Sr
DL	55	Devin Hernandez	Jr
DE	56	Edwin Hooper	Jr
DL	57	Blake Huisman	Fr
DL	58	Blake Schroeder	Fr
DL	60	Chance Morland	Fr
DE	90	Tye Spies	So
DL	91	Jacob Bartling	So
DL	92	Hinwa Allieu	Fr
DL	93	Jordan Ingraham	Fr
DL	94	Sam Stoltenberg	Jr
DL	95	Noah Duncan	Fr
DL	96	Brook Brown	Fr
DL	97	Rhett Hanson	Fr
DL	99	Maleek Mitchell	Jr

Special teams

Pos.	#	Name	Class
K	27	Brenden Wentling	Jr
P	49	Brendan Barnes	Fr
P	98	Payton Fluckey	Sr

Head coach

- Josh Lamberson

Coordinators/assistant coaches

- See coaching staff

Legend

- (C) Team captain
- (S) Suspended
- (I) Ineligible
- Injured
- Redshirt

Roster
Last update: 2016-08-12

== Schedule ==
Date	Time	Opponent	Site	Result	Attendance
September 1	7:00 pm	at Missouri Western	Spratt Stadium; St. Joseph, MO	L 21–44	6,017
September 8	7:00 pm	Emporia State	Ron & Carol Cope Stadium; Kearney, NE	L 7–34	4,663
September 17	1:30 pm	at No. 1 Northwest Missouri State	Bearcat Stadium; Maryville, MO	L 14–52	8,550
September 24	2:00 pm	Washburn	Ron & Carol Cope Stadium; Kearney, NE	L 44–47 ^{3OT}	4,028
October 1	2:00 pm	Missouri Southern	Ron & Carol Cope Stadium; Kearney, NE	L 14–24	2,005
October 8	1:00 pm	at Central Missouri	Audrey J. Walton Stadium; Warrensburg, MO	L 16–36	6,637
October 15	2:00 pm	Central Oklahoma	Ron & Carol Cope Stadium; Kearney, NE	W 47–32	2,200
October 22	2:00 pm	at Northeastern State	Doc Wadley Stadium; Tahlequah, OK	L 21–31	1,187
October 29	2:00 pm	Lindenwood	Ron & Carol Cope Stadium; Kearney, NE	L 14–35	2,005
November 5	2:00 pm	at Pittsburg State	Carnie Smith Stadium; Pittsburg, KS	L 21–52	8,253
November 12	2:00 pm	Fort Hays State	Ron & Carol Cope Stadium; Nebraska, NE	L 17–27	2,100
Rankings from Coaches' Poll released prior to the game; All times are in Central time

=== Game summaries ===
==== Missouri Western ====
Nebraska–Kearney at Missouri Western

Team	1	2	3	4	Total
Nebraska–Kearney	0	7	0	14	21
• Missouri Western	2	21	7	14	44

- Date: September 1
- Location: Ron & Carol Cope Stadium, Kearney, NE
- Game start: 7:00 pm CDT
- Elapsed time: 2:59
- Game attendance: 6,017
- Game weather: Clear, 73 °F (23 °C)
- Referee: John Steiger

==== Emporia State ====
Emporia State at Nebraska–Kearney

Team	1	2	3	4	Total
• Emporia State	3	14	10	7	34
Nebraska–Kearney	0	0	0	7	7

- Date: September 8
- Location: Ron & Carol Cope Stadium, Kearney, NE
- Game start: 7:00 pm CDT
- Elapsed time: 3:13
- Game attendance: 4,663
- Game weather: Breezy, 79 °F (26 °C)
- Referee: Lonnie Brickman

==== Northwest Missouri State ====
Nebraska–Kearney at Northwest Missouri State

Team	1	2	3	4	Total
Nebraska–Kearney	7	0	7	0	14
• #1 Northwest Missouri State	10	28	7	7	52

- Date: September 17
- Location: Bearcat Stadium, Maryville, MO
- Game start: 1:30 pm CST
- Elapsed time: 3:01
- Game attendance: 8,550
- Game weather: Sunny, 70 °F (21 °C)
- Referee: Brian Moore

==== Washburn ====
Washburn at Nebraska–Kearney

Team	1	2	3	4	OT	2OT	3OT	Total
• Washburn	3	3	14	7	7	7	6	47
Nebraska–Kearney	7	0	6	14	7	7	3	44

- Date: September 24
- Location: Ron & Carol Cope Stadium, Kearney, NE
- Game start: 2:00 pm CDT
- Elapsed time: 3:35
- Game attendance: 4,028
- Game weather: Calm, 65 °F (18 °C)

==== Missouri Southern ====
Missouri Southern at Nebraska–Kearney

Team	1	2	3	4	Total
• Missouri Southern	14	0	3	7	24
Nebraska–Kearney	0	7	0	7	14

- Date: October 1
- Location: Ron & Carol Cope Stadium, Kearney, NE
- Game start: 2:00 pm CDT
- Elapsed time: 3:10
- Game attendance: 2,005
- Game weather: Clear, 75 °F (24 °C)
- Referee: John Steiger

==== Central Missouri ====
Nebraska–Kearney at Central Missouri

Team	1	2	3	4	Total
Nebraska–Kearney	0	6	3	7	16
• Central Missouri	7	20	9	0	36

- Date: October 8
- Location: Audrey J. Walton Stadium, Warrensburg, MO
- Game start: 1:00 pm CDT
- Elapsed time: 2:54
- Game attendance: 6,637
- Game weather: Sunny, 60 °F (16 °C)
- Referee: Brian Moore

==== Central Oklahoma ====
Central Oklahoma at Nebraska–Kearney

Team	1	2	3	4	Total
Central Oklahoma	3	7	7	15	32
• Nebraska–Kearney	7	20	13	7	47

- Date: October 15
- Location: Ron & Carol Cope Stadium, Kearney, NE
- Game start: 2:00 pm CDT
- Elapsed time: 3:20
- Game attendance: 2,200
- Game weather: Overcast, 70 °F (21 °C)
- Referee: John Adams

==== Northeastern State ====
Nebraska–Kearney at Northeastern State

Team	1	2	3	4	Total
Nebraska–Kearney	0	0	14	7	21
• Northeastern State	10	7	7	7	31

- Date: October 22
- Location: Doc Wadley Stadium, Tahlequah, OK
- Game start: 2:00 pm CDT
- Elapsed time: 3:05
- Game attendance: 1,187
- Game weather: Sunny, 73 °F (23 °C)
- Referee: John Steiger

==== Lindenwood ====
Lindenwood at Nebraska–Kearney

Team	1	2	3	4	Total
• Lindenwood	0	28	0	7	35
Nebraska–Kearney	7	0	0	7	14

- Date: October 29
- Location: Ron & Carol Cope Stadium, Kearney, NE
- Game start: 2:00 pm CDT
- Elapsed time: 2:45
- Game attendance: 2,005
- Game weather: Sunny, 65 °F (18 °C)
- Referee: Lonnie Brickman

==== Pittsburg State ====
Nebraska–Kearney at Pittsburg State

Team	1	2	3	4	Total
Nebraska–Kearney	7	14	0	0	21
• Pittsburg State	7	24	14	7	52

- Date: November 5
- Location: Carnie Smith Stadium, Pittsburg, KS
- Game start: 2:00 pm CDT
- Elapsed time: 3:01
- Game attendance: 8,253
- Game weather: Overcast, 67 °F (19 °C)
- Referee: Brian Moore

==== Fort Hays State ====
Fort Hays State at Nebraska–Kearney

Team	1	2	3	4	Total
• Fort Hays State	7	0	7	13	27
Nebraska–Kearney	3	7	0	7	17

- Date: November 12
- Location: Ron & Carol Cope Stadium, Kearney, NE
- Game start: 2:00 pm CST
- Elapsed time: 2:45
- Game attendance: 2,100
- Game weather: Sunny, 55 °F (13 °C)
- Referee: John Adams
