= 2016 Missouri Western Griffons football team =

American college football season

2016 Missouri Western Griffons football
- Conference: Mid-America Intercollegiate Athletics Association
- Record: 4–7 (4–7 MIAA)
- Head coach: Jerry Partridge (20th season)
- Offensive coordinator: Todd Throckmorton (8th season)
- Defensive coordinator: Regi Trotter (12th season)
- Home stadium: Spratt Stadium

2016 Mid-America Intercollegiate Athletics Association football standings
| | Conf. | | | Overall |
| Team | W | | L | W | | L |
|---|---|---|---|---|---|---|
| No. 1 NW Missouri State $^ | 11 | – | 0 | 15 | – | 0 |
| No. 10 Emporia State ^ | 10 | – | 1 | 11 | – | 2 |
| No. 21 Central Missouri ^ | 9 | – | 2 | 9 | – | 3 |
| Fort Hays State # | 7 | – | 4 | 8 | – | 4 |
| Pittsburg State | 7 | – | 4 | 7 | – | 4 |
| Washburn # | 7 | – | 4 | 7 | – | 5 |
| Missouri Western | 4 | – | 7 | 4 | – | 7 |
| Central Oklahoma | 3 | – | 8 | 3 | – | 8 |
| Lindenwood | 3 | – | 8 | 3 | – | 8 |
| Missouri Southern | 2 | – | 9 | 2 | – | 9 |
| Northeastern State | 2 | – | 9 | 2 | – | 9 |
| Nebraska–Kearney | 1 | – | 10 | 1 | – | 10 |
$ – Conference champion; ^ – NCAA Division II playoff participant; # – bowl participant (Wahsburn: Mineral Water Bowl, Fort Hays State: C.H.A.M.P.S. Heart of Texas Bowl; Rankings from AFCA poll)

The 2016 Missouri Western Griffons football team represented Missouri Western State University in the 2016 NCAA Division II football season. The Griffons played their home games on Craig Field in Spratt Stadium in St. Joseph, Missouri, as they have done since 1970. 2016 was the 47th season in school history. The Griffons were led by twentieth-year head coach, Jerry Partridge. Missouri Western has been a member of the Mid-America Intercollegiate Athletics Association since 1989.

== Preseason ==
The Griffons entered the 2016 season after finishing 2015 with a 6–5 record overall and in conference play, under Partridge. On August 2, 2016 at the MIAA Football Media Day, the Griffons were chosen to finish in 7th place in both the Coaches Poll and Media Poll.

== Personnel ==
=== Coaching staff ===
Along with Partridge, there were 8 assistants.

| Name | Position | Seasons at MWSU | Alma Mater |
|---|---|---|---|
| Jerry Partridge | Head coach | 20 | Missouri Western (1985) |
| Andy Ball | Assistant head coach – offensive line | 2 | Central Missouri (2001) |
| Joel Beard | Passing game coordinator | 4 | Wisconsin–Stout (2000) |
| Scott Groner | Assistant head coach – specialists/equipment manager | 2 | Missouri Western (2014) |
| Todd Thrckmorton | Offensive line | 8 | Missouri Western (1987) |
| Regi Trotter | Assistant head coach – secondary | 12 | Missouri Western (2000) |
| Collin McQuillian | Graduate assistant – defensive backs | 2 | Missouri Western (2012) |
| Corey Shandrick | Graduate assistant – running backs | 2 | Illinois State (2014) |
| Nick Williams | Graduate assistant – linebackers | 2 | Missouri Western (2015) |

=== Roster ===
2016 Missouri Western Griffons football team roster
Players
Coaches
Offense

| Pos. | # | Name | Class |
|---|---|---|---|
| WR | 1 | Dijuan Ussery | Jr |
| WR | 2 | Brandynn Clar | Sr |
| WR | 4 | Dee Toliver | Sr |
| QB | 6 | T.J. LaFaver | So |
| QB | 9 | Skyler Windmiller | So |
| QB | 10 | Nate Wilson | Jr |
| RB | 11 | Dominic Jamerson | Fr |
| WR | 14 | Tyler Wrice | So |
| WR | 15 | Trey Lewis | Jr |
| WR | 16 | Brandin Dandridge | Fr |
| WR | 18 | Anthony Holmes | Fr |
| RB | 20 | Josh Caldwell | Fr |
| RB | 22 | Kendall Short | So |
| RB | 24 | Derek Gray | Fr |
| RB | 26 | Raphael Spencer | Sr |
| RB | 33 | Ian McIntosh | So |
| WR | 37 | Preston Martin | Fr |
| WR | 39 | Chase Simpson | Fr |
| TE | 42 | Blake Burau | Fr |
| TE | 46 | Jesse Dickens | Fr |
| RB | 47 | DeEll Midgyett | Fr |
| OL | 50 | Shawn Rose, Jr. | Fr |
| OL | 53 | Brinden Ewing | Fr |
| OL | 54 | Nathan O'Neill | Jr |
| OL | 56 | Hayden Eatinger | Fr |
| OL | 59 | Max Oser | Jr |
| OL | 60 | Kyle Dumler | Fr |
| OL | 64 | Travis Anderson | Jr |
| OL | 65 | Dillon Grieme | Fr |
| OL | 67 | Emmett Wester | So |
| OL | 68 | Tyler Base | Fr |
| OL | 70 | Mike Houghtaling | Sr |
| OL | 71 | Tre'von Wilson | Fr |
| OL | 73 | Tyler Easton | Fr |
| OL | 75 | Tanner Hale | Fr |
| OL | 76 | John Carter | Jr |
| OL | 77 | Nic Williams | Sr |
| OL | 79 | Leonard Wester | Sr |
| TE | 80 | Austin Buraute | So |
| TE | 81 | Blake Vandenburg | Jr |
| WR | 82 | Juwan Johnson | Fr |
| WR | 84 | James Williams | Jr |
| WR | 85 | Kylan Alexander | Fr |
| TE | 86 | Trevor Belmont | Fr |
| WR | 87 | Harold Mabill | Fr |
| TE | 88 | Alek Ferbet | Sr |

Defense

| Pos. | # | Name | Class |
|---|---|---|---|
| DB | 3 | Jonathan Owens | So |
| LB | 5 | Yomi Alli | Sr |
| DB | 7 | Sam Brown | Sr |
| LB | 8 | Darrian Bass | Jr |
| LB | 12 | Cody Lindsay | So |
| LB | 13 | Jimmy Huskey | So |
| DB | 17 | Donte Watkins | So |
| DB | 21 | Romello Cotman | Fr |
| DB | 23 | Michael Jordan | Sr |
| DB | 25 | Elroy Douglas | Sr |
| DB | 27 | O.J. Graves | Jr |
| DB | 28 | Robert Richmond, Jr. | Fr |
| LB | 29 | Tyrell Robison | So |
| LB | 30 | Jorge Belcher | Jr |
| DB | 31 | Brock Kimball | Jr |
| DB | 32 | Roderick Beasley | Fr |
| LB | 35 | Malik Johnson | Sr |
| DB | 36 | Quintin Mueller | Fr |
| LB | 40 | Thomas Bump | Fr |
| LB | 43 | Markel Fluker | Fr |
| DB | 44 | Da'Quan Ervin | Fr |
| LB | 45 | Charlie Sciara | Jr |
| LB | 48 | Connor Haynes | Fr |
| LB | 49 | Justin Lovelace | Fr |
| DL | 52 | Colten Hedrick | Fr |
| DL | 74 | Joshua Riggs | Fr |
| DL | 78 | Arbanas Elliott | Sr |
| DL | 90 | Mackenzie Wischmann | Jr |
| DL | 91 | Richard Obi | Sr |
| DL | 92 | Joseph Boettcher | Fr |
| DL | 93 | Austin Drennen | So |
| DL | 94 | Brody Berry | Sr |
| DL | 95 | Dennis McKinney | Fr |
| DL | 96 | Daylon Harper | Jr |
| DL | 97 | Janis Matulis | Sr |
| DL | 99 | Rashon Anderson | Fr |

Special teams

| Pos. | # | Name | Class |
|---|---|---|---|
| P | 19 | Matthew Vincent | Jr |
| K | 34 | Sean Galey | Fr |
| P | 38 | Luke Theis | Fr |
| K | 41 | Tanner Pettet | Fr |
| LS | 51 | Cameron Glenn | Jr |
| K | 98 | Tyler Basch | So |

Head coach

- Jerry Partridge

Coordinators/assistant coaches

- See coaching staff

Legend

- (C) Team captain
- (S) Suspended
- (I) Ineligible
- Injured
- Redshirt

Roster
Last update: 2016-08-05

== Schedule ==
| Date | Time | Opponent | Site | Result | Attendance |
|---|---|---|---|---|---|
| September 1 | 7:00 pm | Nebraska–Kearney | Spratt Stadium; St. Joseph, MO | W 44–21 | 6,017 |
| September 10 | 6:00 pm | at Missouri Southern | Fred G. Hughes Stadium; Joplin, MO | W 51–14 | 4,274 |
| September 17 | 6:00 pm | No. 14 Central Missouri | Spratt Stadium; St. Joseph, MO | L 34–38 | 6,533 |
| September 24 | 6:00 pm | at Central Oklahoma | Wantland Stadium; Edmond, OK | L 21–31 | 3,120 |
| October 1 | 1:00 pm | Northeastern State | Spratt Stadium; St. Joseph, MO | W 45–14 | 3,682 |
| October 8 | 1:30 pm | at Lindenwood | Harlen C. Hunter Stadium; St. Charles, MO | W 37–29 | 2,132 |
| October 15 | 2:00 pm | Pittsburg State^{†} | Spratt Stadium; Joplin, MO | L 47–55 | 5,515 |
| October 22 | 2:00 pm | at Fort Hays State | Lewis Field Stadium; Hays, KS | L 27–35 | 3,250 |
| October 29 | 1:00 pm | at Washburn | Yager Stadium; Topeka, KS | L 13–16 | 6,023 |
| November 5 | 1:00 pm | No. 9 Emporia State | Spratt Stadium; St. Joseph, MO | L 14–27 | 4,017 |
| November 12 | 1:30 pm | at No. 1 Northwest Missouri State | Bearcat Stadium; Maryville, MO (Rivalry) | L 3–44 | 7,542 |
^{†}Homecoming; Rankings from Coaches' Poll released prior to the game; All times are in Central time

=== Game summaries ===
==== Nebraska–Kearney ====
Missouri Western at Nebraska–Kearney

| Team | 1 | 2 | 3 | 4 | Total |
|---|---|---|---|---|---|
| Missouri Western | 0 | 7 | 0 | 14 | 21 |
| • Nebraska–Kearney | 2 | 21 | 7 | 14 | 44 |

- Date: September 1
- Location: Ron & Carol Cope Stadium, Kearney, NE
- Game start: 7:00 pm CDT
- Elapsed time: 2:59
- Game attendance: 6,017
- Game weather: Clear, 73 °F (23 °C)
- Referee: John Steiger

==== Missouri Southern ====
Missouri Western at Missouri Southern

| Team | 1 | 2 | 3 | 4 | Total |
|---|---|---|---|---|---|
| • Missouri Western | 7 | 21 | 6 | 17 | 51 |
| Missouri Southern | 0 | 6 | 2 | 6 | 14 |

- Date: September 10
- Location: Fred G. Hughes Stadium, Joplin, MO
- Game start: 6:00 pm CDT
- Elapsed time: 2:45
- Game attendance: 2,474
- Game weather: Overcast, 72 °F (22 °C)
- Referee: Dwight Neibling

==== Central Missouri ====
Central Missouri at Missouri Western

| Team | 1 | 2 | 3 | 4 | Total |
|---|---|---|---|---|---|
| • #14 Central Missouri | 14 | 10 | 7 | 7 | 38 |
| Missouri Western | 10 | 7 | 10 | 7 | 34 |

- Date: October 15
- Location: Spratt Stadium, St. Joseph, MO
- Game start: 6:00 pm CDT
- Elapsed time: 3:00
- Game attendance: 6,533
- Game weather: Sunny, 79 °F (26 °C)
- Referee: Craig Helser

==== Central Oklahoma ====
Missouri Western at Central Oklahoma

| Team | 1 | 2 | 3 | 4 | Total |
|---|---|---|---|---|---|
| Missouri Western | 0 | 14 | 7 | 0 | 21 |
| • Central Oklahoma | 7 | 10 | 7 | 7 | 31 |

- Date: September 24
- Location: Wantland Stadium, Edmond, OK
- Game start: 6:00 pm CDT
- Elapsed time: 4:27
- Game attendance: 3,120
- Game weather: Rain, 60 °F (16 °C)
- Referee: John Adams

==== Northeastern State ====
Northeastern State at Missouri Western

| Team | 1 | 2 | 3 | 4 | Total |
|---|---|---|---|---|---|
| Northeastern State | 0 | 0 | 0 | 14 | 14 |
| • Missouri Western | 14 | 10 | 14 | 7 | 45 |

- Date: October 1
- Location: Spratt Stadium, St. Joseph, MO
- Game start: 1:00 pm CDT
- Elapsed time: 2:40
- Game attendance: 3,682
- Game weather: Overcast, 65 °F (18 °C)
- Referee: Sean Johnston

==== Lindenwood ====
Missouri Western at Lindenwood

| Team | 1 | 2 | 3 | 4 | Total |
|---|---|---|---|---|---|
| • Missouri Western | 7 | 20 | 0 | 10 | 37 |
| Lindenwood | 7 | 16 | 0 | 6 | 29 |

- Date: October 8
- Location: Harlen C. Hunter Stadium, St. Charles, MO
- Game start: 1:30 pm CDT
- Elapsed time: 2:58
- Game attendance: 2,132
- Game weather: Sunny, 66 °F (19 °C)
- Referee: Craig Helser

==== Pittsburg State ====
Pittsburg State at Missouri Western

| Team | 1 | 2 | 3 | 4 | Total |
|---|---|---|---|---|---|
| • Pittsburg State | 14 | 20 | 14 | 7 | 55 |
| Missouri Western | 12 | 7 | 7 | 21 | 47 |

- Date: October 15
- Location: Spratt Stadium, St. Joseph, MO
- Game start: 2:00 pm CDT
- Elapsed time: 3:00
- Game attendance: 5,515
- Game weather: Overcast, 72 °F (22 °C)
- Referee: Dwight Neibling

==== Fort Hays State ====
Missouri Western at Fort Hays State

| Team | 1 | 2 | 3 | 4 | Total |
|---|---|---|---|---|---|
| Missouri Western | 12 | 7 | 0 | 8 | 27 |
| • Fort Hays State | 7 | 14 | 0 | 14 | 35 |

- Date: October 22
- Location: Lewis Field Stadium, Hays, KS
- Game start: 2:00 pm CDT
- Elapsed time: 3:00
- Game attendance: 3,250
- Game weather: Sunny, 82 °F (28 °C)
- Referee: Danny Harris

==== Washburn ====
Missouri Western at Washburn

| Team | 1 | 2 | 3 | 4 | Total |
|---|---|---|---|---|---|
| Missouri Western | 6 | 7 | 0 | 0 | 13 |
| • Washburn | 3 | 7 | 6 | 0 | 16 |

- Date: October 29
- Location: Yager Stadium, Topeka, KS
- Game start: 1:00 pm CDT
- Elapsed time: 2:54
- Game attendance: 6,023
- Game weather: Sunny, 76 °F (24 °C)
- Referee: Craig Helser

==== Emporia State ====
Emporia State at Missouri Western

| Team | 1 | 2 | 3 | 4 | Total |
|---|---|---|---|---|---|
| • #9 Emporia State | 3 | 7 | 0 | 17 | 27 |
| Missouri Western | 7 | 7 | 0 | 0 | 14 |

- Date: November 5
- Location: Spratt Stadium, St. Joseph, MO
- Game start: 1:00 pm CDT
- Elapsed time: 2:48
- Game attendance: 4,017
- Game weather: Slight overcast, 70 °F (21 °C)
- Referee: Sean Johnston

==== Northwest Missouri State ====
Missouri Western at Northwest Missouri State

| Team | 1 | 2 | 3 | 4 | Total |
|---|---|---|---|---|---|
| Missouri Western | 0 | 3 | 0 | 0 | 3 |
| • #1 Northwest Missouri State | 10 | 7 | 10 | 17 | 44 |

- Date: November 12
- Location: Bearcat Stadium, Maryville, MO
- Game start: 1:30 pm CST
- Elapsed time: 2:50
- Game attendance: 7,542
- Game weather: Sunny, 50 °F (10 °C)
- Referee: Dwight Neibling
