= 2016 Fort Hays State Tigers football team =

American college football season

2016 Fort Hays State Tigers football

Heart of Texas Bowl, W 45–12 vs. Eastern New Mexico
- Conference: Mid-America Intercollegiate Athletics Association
- Record: 8–4 (7–4 MIAA)
- Head coach: Chris Brown (6th season)
- Offensive coordinator: Cooper Harris (4th season)
- Defensive coordinator: Al McCray (8th season)
- Home stadium: Lewis Field Stadium

2016 Mid-America Intercollegiate Athletics Association football standings
	Conf.			Overall
Team	W		L	W		L
No. 1 NW Missouri State $^	11	–	0	15	–	0
No. 10 Emporia State ^	10	–	1	11	–	2
No. 21 Central Missouri ^	9	–	2	9	–	3
Fort Hays State #	7	–	4	8	–	4
Pittsburg State	7	–	4	7	–	4
Washburn #	7	–	4	7	–	5
Missouri Western	4	–	7	4	–	7
Central Oklahoma	3	–	8	3	–	8
Lindenwood	3	–	8	3	–	8
Missouri Southern	2	–	9	2	–	9
Northeastern State	2	–	9	2	–	9
Nebraska–Kearney	1	–	10	1	–	10
$ – Conference champion; ^ – NCAA Division II playoff participant; # – bowl participant (Wahsburn: Mineral Water Bowl, Fort Hays State: C.H.A.M.P.S. Heart of Texas Bowl; Rankings from AFCA poll)

The 2016 Fort Hays State Tigers football team represented Fort Hays State University in the 2016 NCAA Division II football season. The Tigers played their home games at Lewis Field Stadium in Hays, Kansas, as they have done since 1936. 2016 was the 111th season in school history. The Tigers were led by sixth-year head coach, Chris Brown. Fort Hays State has been a member of the Mid-America Intercollegiate Athletics Association since 2006.

== Preseason ==
The Tigers entered the 2016 season after finishing 8–4 overall, 8–3 in conference play last season under Brown. On August 2, 2016 at the MIAA Football Media Day, the Tigers were chosen to finish in sixth place in the Coaches Poll, and fifth in the Media Poll.

== Personnel ==
=== Coaching staff ===
Along with Brown, there were 10 assistants.

Name	Position	Seasons at FHSU	Alma Mater
Chris Brown	Head coach	6	Pittsburg State (1996)
Al McCray	Assistant head coach – Wide Receivers	8	Clinch Valley
Cooper Harris	Assistant head coach – Defensive Coordinator	4	Pittsburg State (1995)
Jeff Bryant	Assistant head coach – Offensive Coordinator	1	Tulsa (2007)
Philip Vigil	Assistant head coach – Passing Game/Recruiting Coord.	1	Colorado Mesa (2009)
Ike Eguae	Assistant head coach – Defensive Line	2	Pittsburg State (2007)
Steven Dudley	Assistant head coach – Special Teams & Defensive Backs	3	Washburn (2013)
Mike Hepp	Assistant head coach – Defensive Line	2	Ripon College (2012)
Jared Haferbier	Assistant head coach – Running Backs	1	Truman State (2015)
Zach Burkhart	Assistant head coach – Tight Ends	1	Pittsburg State (2015)
Doug Boucher	Strength & conditioning Coach	2	Kansas State (1984)

=== Roster ===
2016 Fort Hays State Tigers football team roster
Players
Coaches
Offense

Pos.	#	Name	Class
RB	2	Shaquille Cooper	Jr
RB	3	Kenneth Iheme	Sr
QB	4	Jacob Mezera	So
QB	12	Brad Schenecker	Sr
QB	16	Erin Gaither	So
WR	28	Tyler Bacon	Jr
RB	29	Malik Thomas	So
RB	32	Christian Sanders	So
RB	37	Elliot Carlson	Jr
OL	64	Travis Talley	Jr
OL	65	Britton Bishop	So
OL	72	Daniel Hubbard	Sr
OL	73	Mason Dickey	Sr
OL	79	Richard Feltenberger	Sr
WR	80	Kenton Ubelaker	So
WR	81	Evan Jennings	Sr
WR	82	Bilal Salat	Sr
TE	85	J.J. Lewis	Jr
WR	89	Isaiah Maxi	Sr

Defense

Pos.	#	Name	Class
DB	5	Raheeme Dumas	Sr
DB	6	Doyin Jibowu	So
DL	8	Sie Doe, Jr.	Sr
DL	14	Rashad Dunnigan	Sr
DB	15	Aquil Knowles	So
DB	19	Connor Shedeed	So
DB	21	DeAndre James	Sr
DB	22	Trae Regier	Jr
DL	25	Jose Delgado	So
DB	26	Bobby Stinson	So
LB	30	Kane Kelly	Sr
LB	31	Tevin Evans	So
DB	35	Dillando Allotey	Jr
LB	40	Alex Schmidtberger	Sr
LB	42	Dalton Gould	Sr
DB	44	Brandon Halperin	So
DB	45	Aiyonte Roper	So
LB	46	Cory Ellis	Sr
LB	47	Justin McPHail	Sr
DL	57	Wyatt Parker	So
DL	90	Romello Robinson	Fr
DL	92	Tumua Masaniai	Sr
DL	93	Kiel Simas	Fr
DL	94	Noah Debban	Jr
DL	96	Luke Wright	Jr
DL	97	Nathan Shepherd	Jr

Special teams

Pos.	#	Name	Class
K	39	Nick Wohlgemuth	So

Head coach

- Chris Brown

Coordinators/assistant coaches

- See coaching staff

Legend

- (C) Team captain
- (S) Suspended
- (I) Ineligible
- Injured
- Redshirt

Roster
Last update: 2016-07-19

== Schedule ==
Date	Time	Opponent	Site	TV	Result	Attendance
September 1	7:00 pm	Missouri Southern	Lewis Field Stadium; Hays, KS		W 22–10	4,134
September 8	7:00 pm	at No. 16 Central Missouri	Audrey J. Walton Stadium; Warrensburg, MO		L 17–34	7,279
September 17	7:00 pm	Central Oklahoma	Lewis Field Stadium; Hays, KS		W 34–20	3,520
September 24	1:00 pm	at Northeastern State	Doc Wadley Stadium; Tahlequah, OK		W 34–7	2,526
October 1	2:00 pm	Lindenwood	Lewis Field Stadium; Hays, KS		W 37–6	4,266
October 8	2:00 pm	at Pittsburg State	Carnie Smith Stadium; Pittsburg, KS		W 54–41	10,238
October 15	1:00 pm	at Washburn	Yager Stadium; Topeka, KS		L 24–30	5,350
October 22	2:00 pm	Missouri Western^{†}	Lewis Field Stadium; Hays, KS		W 35–27	3,250
October 29	2:00 pm	at No. 10 Emporia State	Francis G. Welch Stadium; Emporia, KS		L 16–24	6,103
November 5	1:00 pm	No. 1 Northwest Missouri State	Lewis Field Stadium; Hays, KS		L 7–28	3,325
November 12	1:00 pm	at Nebraska–Kearney	Ron & Carol Cope Stadium; Kearney, NE		W 27–17	2,100
December 3	6:00 p.m.	vs. Eastern New Mexico*	Bulldawg Stadium; Copperas Cove, TX (Heart of Texas Bowl)	ESPN 3	W 45–12	750
*Non-conference game; ^{†}Homecoming; Rankings from Coaches' Poll released prior to the game; All times are in Central time

=== Game notes, regular season ===
==== Missouri Southern ====
Missouri Southern at Fort Hays State

Team	1	2	3	4	Total
Missouri Southern	0	3	7	0	10
• Fort Hays State	7	6	6	3	22

- Date: September 1
- Location: Lewis Field Stadium, Hays, KS
- Game start: 7:00 pm CDT
- Elapsed time: 2:54
- Game attendance: 4,134
- Game weather: Sunny and Breezy, 79 °F (26 °C)
- Referee: Lonnie Brickman

==== Central Missouri ====
Fort Hays State at Central Missouri

Team	1	2	3	4	Total
Fort Hays State	0	7	0	10	17
• #16 Central Missouri	14	3	14	3	34

- Date: September 8
- Location: Walton Stadium, Warrensburg, MO
- Game start: 7:00 pm CDT
- Elapsed time: 2:51
- Game attendance: 7,279
- Game weather: Cloudy, 78 °F (26 °C)
- Referee: Danny Harris

==== Central Oklahoma ====
Central Oklahoma at Fort Hays State

Team	1	2	3	4	Total
Central Oklahoma	0	10	3	7	20
• Fort Hays State	21	3	3	7	34

- Date: September 17
- Location: Lewis Field Stadium, Hays, KS
- Game start: 7:00 pm CDT
- Elapsed time: 4:10
- Game attendance: 3,520
- Game weather: Overcast, 76 °F (24 °C)
- Referee: Sean Johnston

==== Northeastern State ====
Fort Hays State at Northeastern State

Team	1	2	3	4	Total
• Fort Hays State	0	17	7	10	34
Northeastern State	0	0	7	0	7

- Date: September 24
- Location: Wadley Stadium, Tahlequah, OK
- Game start: 1:00 pm CDT
- Elapsed time: 2:51
- Game attendance: 2,526
- Game weather: Clear, 75 °F (24 °C)
- Referee: Dwight Neibling

==== Lindenwood ====
Lindenwood at Fort Hays State

Team	1	2	3	4	Total
Lindenwood	6	0	0	0	6
• Fort Hays State	21	3	6	7	37

- Date: October 1
- Location: Lewis Field Stadium, Hays, KS
- Game start: 2:00 pm CDT
- Elapsed time: 2:54
- Game attendance: 4,266
- Game weather: Sunny, 77 °F (25 °C)
- Referee: John Adams

==== Pittsburg State ====
Fort Hays State at Pittsburg State

Team	1	2	3	4	Total
• Fort Hays State	10	14	14	16	54
Pittsburg State	14	6	7	14	41

- Date: October 8
- Location: Smith Stadium, Pittsburg, KS
- Game start: 2:00 pm CDT
- Elapsed time: 3:08
- Game attendance: 10,238
- Game weather: Clear, 69 °F (21 °C)
- Referee: Lonnie Brickman

==== Washburn ====
Fort Hays State at Washburn

Team	1	2	3	4	Total
Fort Hays State	0	14	3	7	24
• Washburn	13	10	7	0	30

- Date: October 15
- Location: Yager Stadium, Topeka, KS
- Game start: 1:00 pm CDT
- Elapsed time: 3:05
- Game attendance: 5,350
- Game weather: Overcast, 72 °F (22 °C)
- Referee: Sean Johnston

==== Missouri Western ====
Missouri Western at Fort Hays State

Team	1	2	3	4	Total
Missouri Western	12	7	0	8	27
• Fort Hays State	7	14	0	14	35

- Date: October 22
- Location: Lewis Field Stadium, Hays, KS
- Game start: 2:00 pm CDT
- Elapsed time: 3:00
- Game attendance: 3,250
- Game weather: Sunny, 82 °F (28 °C)
- Referee: Danny Harris

==== Emporia State ====
Fort Hays State at Emporia State

Team	1	2	3	4	Total
Fort Hays State	3	0	0	13	16
• #10 Emporia State	7	0	7	10	24

- Date: October 29
- Location: Francis G. Welch Stadium, Emporia, KS
- Game start: 2:00 pm CDT
- Elapsed time: 2:54
- Game attendance: 6,103
- Game weather: Mostly sunny, 81 °F (27 °C)
- Referee: Dwight Neibling

==== Northwest Missouri State ====
Northwest Missouri State at Fort Hays State

Team	1	2	3	4	Total
• #1 Northwest Missouri State	14	0	0	14	28
Fort Hays State	0	0	0	7	7

- Date: November 5
- Location: Lewis Field Stadium, Hays, KS
- Game start: 2:00 pm CDT
- Elapsed time: 3:02
- Game attendance: 3,325
- Game weather: Partly cloudy, 67 °F (19 °C)
- Referee: Craig Helser

==== Nebraska–Kearney ====
Fort Hays State at Nebraska–Kearney

Team	1	2	3	4	Total
• Fort Hays State	7	0	7	13	27
Nebraska–Kearney	3	7	0	7	17

- Date: November 12
- Location: Cope Stadium, Kearney, NE
- Game start: 2:00 pm CST
- Elapsed time: 2:45
- Game attendance: 2,100
- Game weather: Sunny, 55 °F (13 °C)
- Referee: John Adams

=== Game notes, post-season ===
==== Eastern New Mexico ====
Eastern New Mexico vs. Fort Hays State

Team	1	2	3	4	Total
Eastern New Mexico	0	9	0	3	12
• Fort Hays State	14	21	0	10	45

- Date: December 3
- Location: Bulldawg Stadium, Copperas Cove, TX
- Game start: 6:00 pm CST
- Elapsed time: 3:25
- Game attendance: 750
- Game weather: Cool, 50 °F (10 °C)
