= 2016 Lindenwood Lions football team =

American college football season

2016 Lindenwood Lions football
- Conference: Mid-America Intercollegiate Athletics Association
- Record: 3–8 (3–8 MIAA)
- Head coach: Patrick Ross (13th season)
- Offensive coordinator: Marc Kolb (1st season)
- Defensive coordinator: Deion Melvin (6th season)
- Home stadium: Harlen C. Hunter Stadium

2016 Mid-America Intercollegiate Athletics Association football standings
	Conf.			Overall
Team	W		L	W		L
No. 1 NW Missouri State $^	11	–	0	15	–	0
No. 10 Emporia State ^	10	–	1	11	–	2
No. 21 Central Missouri ^	9	–	2	9	–	3
Fort Hays State #	7	–	4	8	–	4
Pittsburg State	7	–	4	7	–	4
Washburn #	7	–	4	7	–	5
Missouri Western	4	–	7	4	–	7
Central Oklahoma	3	–	8	3	–	8
Lindenwood	3	–	8	3	–	8
Missouri Southern	2	–	9	2	–	9
Northeastern State	2	–	9	2	–	9
Nebraska–Kearney	1	–	10	1	–	10
$ – Conference champion; ^ – NCAA Division II playoff participant; # – bowl participant (Wahsburn: Mineral Water Bowl, Fort Hays State: C.H.A.M.P.S. Heart of Texas Bowl; Rankings from AFCA poll)

The 2016 Lindenwood Lions football team represented Lindenwood University in the 2016 NCAA Division II football season. The Lions played their home games at Harlen C. Hunter Stadium in St. Charles, Missouri, as they have done since 1990. 2016 was the 27th season in school history. The Lions were led by thirteenth-year head coach, Patrick Ross. Lindenwood has been a member of the Mid-America Intercollegiate Athletics Association since 2012.

== Preseason ==
The Lions entered the 2016 season after a 3–8 record in 2015 under Ross. On August 2, 2016 at the MIAA Football Media Day, the Lions were chosen to finish in 11th place in the Coaches Poll, and 9th in the Media Poll.

== Postseason ==
After another losing season and no success in the NCAA Division II since 2012, Ross was relieved of his duties on November 15, 2016. He was 93–57 at Lindenwood.

== Personnel ==
=== Coaching staff ===
Along with Ross, there were 8 assistants.

Name	Position	Seasons at LWU	Alma Mater
Patrick Ross	Head coach	13	Puget Sound (1996)
Deion Melvin	Defensive Coordinator/Defensive Line	6	Western Illinois (1994)
Marc Kolb	Passing Game Coor./Wide Receivers	1	Brown (1994)
Brice Carlson	Offensive Line	1	Guilford (2011)
Jamie Marshall	Defensive Line	1	Drake (1999)
Derek Stanley	Wide Receivers	4	Wisconsin–Whitewater (2007)
Wade Hampton	Special Teams	1	Lindenwood (2003)
Bryan Baldwin	Cornerbacks	1	Kansas State (2008)
Austin Bell	Running Backs	1	Ohio State (2015)

== Schedule ==
Date	Time	Opponent	Site	Result	Attendance
September 1	7:00 pm	Central Oklahoma	Harlen C. Hunter Stadium; St. Charles, MO	W 49–26	3,132
September 8	7:00 pm	at Northeastern State	Doc Wadley Stadium; Tahlequah, OK	L 31–35	2,104
September 17	6:00 pm	at Washburn	Yager Stadium; Topeka, KS	L 34–29	6,721
September 24	6:00 pm	Pittsburg State	Harlen C. Hunter Stadium; St. Charles, MO	L 19–50	3,088
October 1	2:00 pm	at Fort Hays State	Lewis Field Stadium; Hays, KS	L 6–37	4,266
October 8	1:30 pm	Missouri Western	Harlen C. Hunter Stadium; St. Charles, MO	L 37–29	2,132
October 15	2:00 pm	at Emporia State	Francis G. Welch Stadium; Emporia, KS	L 28–35	6,014
October 22	1:30 pm	No. 1 Northwest Missouri State^{†}	Harlen C. Hunter Stadium; St. Charles, MO	L 12–47	3,527
October 29	2:00 pm	at Nebraska–Kearney	Ron & Carol Cope Stadium; Kearney, NE	W 35–14	2,005
November 5	1:30 pm	Missouri Southern	Harlen C. Hunter Stadium; St. Charles, MO	W 42–28	1,563
November 12	1:30 pm	at No. 24 Central Missouri	Audrey J. Walton Stadium; Warrensburg, MO	L 7–35	3,673
^{†}Homecoming; Rankings from Coaches' Poll released prior to the game; All times are in Central time

=== Game summaries ===
==== Central Oklahoma ====
Central Oklahoma at Lindenwood

Team	1	2	3	4	Total
Central Oklahoma	10	10	0	6	26
• Lindenwood	6	7	21	15	49

- Date: September 1
- Location: Harlen C. Hunter Stadium, St. Charles, MO
- Game start: 7:00 pm CDT
- Elapsed time: 3:20
- Game attendance: 3,132
- Game weather: Partly Cloudy, 76 °F (24 °C)
- Referee: Danny Harris

==== Northeastern State ====
Lindenwood at Northeastern State

Team	1	2	3	4	Total
Lindenwood	7	3	14	7	31
• Northeastern State	7	7	7	14	35

- Date: September 8
- Location: Wadley Stadium, Tahlequah, OK
- Game start: 7:00 pm CDT
- Elapsed time: 3:31
- Game attendance: 2,104
- Game weather: Partly Cloudy, 88 °F (31 °C)
- Referee: Brian Moore

==== Washburn ====
Lindenwood at Washburn

Team	1	2	3	4	Total
Lindenwood	7	6	0	16	29
• Washburn	7	27	0	0	34

- Date: September 17
- Location: Yager Stadium, Topeka, KS
- Game start: 6:00 pm CDT
- Elapsed time: 3:15
- Game attendance: 6,721
- Game weather: Calm, 83 °F (28 °C)
- Referee: Dwight Neibling

==== Pittsburg State ====
Pittsburg State at Lindenwood

Team	1	2	3	4	Total
• Pittsburg State	13	14	9	14	50
Lindenwood	0	13	6	0	19

- Date: September 24
- Location: Hunter Stadium, St. Charles, MO
- Game start: 6:00 pm CDT
- Elapsed time: 3:12
- Game attendance: 3,088
- Game weather: Sunny, 86 °F (30 °C)
- Referee: Lonnie Brickman

==== Fort Hays State ====
Lindenwood at Fort Hays State

Team	1	2	3	4	Total
Lindenwood	6	0	0	0	6
• Fort Hays State	21	3	6	7	37

- Date: October 1
- Location: Lewis Field Stadium, Hays, KS
- Game start: 2:00 pm CDT
- Elapsed time: 2:54
- Game attendance: 4,266
- Game weather: Sunny, 77 °F (25 °C)
- Referee: John Adams

==== Missouri Western ====
Missouri Western at Lindenwood

Team	1	2	3	4	Total
• Missouri Western	7	20	0	10	37
Lindenwood	7	16	0	6	29

- Date: October 8
- Location: Hunter Stadium, St. Charles, MO
- Game start: 1:30 pm CDT
- Elapsed time: 2:58
- Game attendance: 2,132
- Game weather: Sunny, 66 °F (19 °C)
- Referee: Craig Helser

==== Emporia State ====
Lindenwood at Emporia State

Team	1	2	3	4	Total
Lindenwood	0	7	7	14	28
• #12 Emporia State	0	0	14	21	35

- Date: October 15
- Location: Welch Stadium, Emporia, KS
- Game start: 2:00 pm CDT
- Elapsed time: 3:12
- Game attendance: 6,014
- Game weather: Overcast, 72 °F (22 °C)
- Referee: Danny Harris

==== Northwest Missouri State ====
Northwest Missouri State at Lindenwood

Team	1	2	3	4	Total
• #1 Northwest Missouri State	14	17	0	16	47
Lindenwood	6	0	0	6	12

- Date: October 22
- Location: Hunter Stadium
- Game start: 1:30 pm CDT
- Elapsed time: 2:54
- Game attendance: 3,527
- Game weather: Sunny, 65 °F (18 °C)
- Referee: Sean Johnston

==== Nebraska–Kearney ====
Lindenwood at Nebraska–Kearney

Team	1	2	3	4	Total
• Lindenwood	0	28	0	7	35
Nebraska–Kearney	7	0	0	7	14

- Date: October 29
- Location: Ron & Carol Cope Stadium, Kearney, NE
- Game start: 2:00 pm CDT
- Elapsed time: 2:45
- Game attendance: 2,005
- Game weather: Sunny, 65 °F (18 °C)
- Referee: Lonnie Brickman

==== Missouri Southern ====
Missouri Southern at Lindenwood

Team	1	2	3	4	Total
Missouri Southern	7	0	7	14	28
• Lindenwood	0	21	7	14	42

- Date: November 5
- Location: Hunter Stadium, St. Charles, MO
- Game start: 1:30 pm CDT
- Elapsed time: 2:57
- Game attendance: 1,563
- Game weather: Partly cloudy, 63 °F (17 °C)
- Referee: John Steiger

==== Central Missouri ====
Lindenwood at Central Missouri

Team	1	2	3	4	Total
Lindenwood	0	0	0	7	7
• #24 Central Missouri	0	14	7	14	35

- Date: November 12
- Location: Walton Stadium, Warrensburg, MO
- Game start: 1:30 pm CST
- Elapsed time: 2:52
- Game attendance: 3,673
- Game weather: Sunny, 50 °F (10 °C)
- Referee: Danny Harris
