= 2016 Pittsburg State Gorillas football team =

American college football season

2016 Pittsburg State Gorillas football
- Conference: Mid-America Intercollegiate Athletics Association
- Record: 7–4 (7–4 MIAA)
- Head coach: Tim Beck (7th season)
- Offensive coordinator: Steve Rampy (6th season)
- Defensive coordinator: Dave Wiemers (9th season)
- Captains: Spencer Brown; Demetrius Bernard; Bo Farrow; Kyle Swartz
- Home stadium: Carnie Smith Stadium

2016 Mid-America Intercollegiate Athletics Association football standings
	Conf.			Overall
Team	W		L	W		L
No. 1 NW Missouri State $^	11	–	0	15	–	0
No. 10 Emporia State ^	10	–	1	11	–	2
No. 21 Central Missouri ^	9	–	2	9	–	3
Fort Hays State #	7	–	4	8	–	4
Pittsburg State	7	–	4	7	–	4
Washburn #	7	–	4	7	–	5
Missouri Western	4	–	7	4	–	7
Central Oklahoma	3	–	8	3	–	8
Lindenwood	3	–	8	3	–	8
Missouri Southern	2	–	9	2	–	9
Northeastern State	2	–	9	2	–	9
Nebraska–Kearney	1	–	10	1	–	10
$ – Conference champion; ^ – NCAA Division II playoff participant; # – bowl participant (Wahsburn: Mineral Water Bowl, Fort Hays State: C.H.A.M.P.S. Heart of Texas Bowl; Rankings from AFCA poll)

The 2016 Pittsburg State Gorillas football team represented Pittsburg State University in the 2016 NCAA Division II football season. The Gorillas played their home games on Brandenburg Field in Carnie Smith Stadium in Pittsburg, Kansas, as they have done since 1923. 2016 was the 109th season in school history. The Gorillas were led by seventh-year head coach, Tim Beck. Pittsburg State has been a member of the Mid-America Intercollegiate Athletics Association since 1989.

== Preseason ==
The Gorillas entered the 2016 season after finishing with a 6–5 record overall and in conference play, under Beck. On August 2, 2016, at the MIAA Football Media Day, the Gorillas were chosen to finish in 3rd place in both the Coaches Poll and in the Media Poll. In the Coaches Poll, Pittsburg State was tied with Emporia State for third.

On August 22, D2football.com released its Top 25 poll, ranking Pittsburg State 24th.

== Personnel ==
=== Coaching staff ===
Along with Beck, there were 12 assistants.

Name	Position	Seasons at PSU	Alma Mater
Tim Beck	Head coach	7	Pittsburg State (1988)
Dave Wiemers	Assist. Head Coach – Defensive Coordinator	9	Washburn (1990)
Steve Rampy	Assist. Head Coach – Offensive Coordinator	6	Truman (1979)
Lance Cullen	Assist. Head Coach – Defensive Secondary	15	St. Mary (1993)
Ryan Hellwig	Assist. Head Coach – Defensive Line	12	Pittsburg State (2007)
John Pierce	Assist. Head Coach – Running backs	29	Pittsburg State (1980)
Carl Roth	Assist. Head Coach – Linebackers	25	Pittsburg State (1993)
Steve Wells	Assist. Head Coach – Offensive Line	9	Pittsburg State (2002)
Larry Garman	Assist. Head Coach – Off-Campus Recruiting	18	Pittsburg State (1962)
Matt Karleskint	Assist. Head Coach – Wide Receivers	1	Kansas Wesleyan (2002)
Luke Miller	Assist. Head Coach – Tight Ends	6	Pittsburg State (2014)
Trey Derryberry	Graduate Assistant – Cornerbacks	3	Pittsburg State (2014)
Chance Riley	Graduate Assistant – Offensive Line	2	Pittsburg State (2014)

=== Roster ===
2016 Pittsburg State Gorillas football team roster
Players
Coaches
Offense

Pos.	#	Name	Class
WR	1	Slade Nordic	So
WR	2	Andre Taylor	Sr
RB	3	Kiah Kintchen	Fr
TE	6	Javon Wilson	Jr
WR	7	Ramsey Hamilton	Jr
WR	8	Levi Copelin	Sr
QB	10	Thomas LePage	Jr
QB	14	Luke Walstad	Fr
WR	17	Austin Panko	Jr
WR	18	Brenner Clemons	Fr
QB	19	John Roderique	So
RB	23	DeMarcus Edwards	So
RB	24	Keynan Schewrich	Fr
RB	29	Steven Sullivan	Jr
RB	30	Michael Rose	Jr
RB	33	Dre Holman	Sr
TE	42	Kohl Slaughter	So
RB	45	Zane Roark	Fr
TE	49	Matt Jones	Jr
OL	62	Dexton Robertson	So
OL	63	Nick Weisenborn	Sr
OL	64	Jaden Helms	Fr
OL	66	Bo Farrow	Jr
OL	68	Benton Sinclair	Fr
OL	70	Tyler Stiff	So
OL	71	Alex Jones	So
OL	72	Ryan Cipriani	Jr
OL	73	Ryan Dodd	Fr
OL	74	Jacob Ralph	Jr
OL	75	Tyler Brave	Fr
OL	76	Sage Mahnken	Fr
OL	77	Kelly Wortham	Jr
OL	79	Codey Funk	Jr
TE	80	Bryce Barto	Fr
TE	81	Jackson Krull	Fr
WR	82	Dash Cameron	Fr
WR	83	Sam Randall	Fr
WR	84	Lorenzo West	Fr
WR	86	Grayson Handel	So
TE	88	Kyle Swartz	Sr
TE	89	Andy Otting	Jr

Defense

Pos.	#	Name	Class
CB	4	Tyree Jefferson	Sr
S	9	DaShaughn Terry	Jr
S	11	Darian Taylor	So
S	12	Tanner Eikenbary	So
CB	13	Darrius White	Sr
LB	15	Ethan Fugitt	Jr
S	16	Brady Bradbury	Jr
CB	20	Juanté Baldwin	Jr
CB	21	Keeyon Incle	Fr
S	22	Devon Washington	Sr
CB	25	Ciyre Simmons	Jr
S	26	Aren Martin	Jr
CB	27	Jonathan Gilkey	So
S	28	Ryan McNerlin	Jr
S	31	Jaxon Wright	Jr
S	32	Quad Ware	Sr
CB	34	William Bazzle	Fr
CB	35	Matt Magee	So
LB	36	Spencer Brown	Sr
S	37	Derrick Banks	So
S	38	Josh Hornback	Fr
S	39	Cassius Hill	Fr
S	40	Nick Wuthnow	So
LB	41	Cale McMakin	Fr
LB	43	Carter Anchors	So
S	44	Drew Dawson	So
LB	47	Demetrius Bernard	So
DE	48	Levi Wyrick	Fr
LB	50	DeShane Lewis	Jr
LB	51	Kyle Brown	Jr
LB	52	Brett McDonald	Fr
LB	53	Drew Gill	Sr
LB	54	Dylan Scheer	Fr
DE	55	Heath Wilson	Fr
LB	56	LaRon Mitchell	Jr
LB	57	Jacob Carpenter	Fr
LB	58	Dylan Smith	Fr
LB	59	Kaden Brannin	Fr
DE	61	Connor Cherry	Fr
DL	65	Ben Saint	Jr
DL	69	Trenton Mooney	Fr
DE	85	Dreu White	Jr
DE	87	Trey Myers	Sr
DE	90	José Speer	Jr
DE	91	Ned Bingaman	Fr
DL	92	Simanu'a Thomas	Fr
DL	93	Brock Bryford	Jr
DL	94	Bradley Payne	So
DL	95	Drake Humphrey	So
DL	96	Chase Carney	Jr
DL	97	Danny Williams	Fr
DL	98	Braxton Early	So
DL	99	Willie Connor	Jr

Special teams

Pos.	#	Name	Class
P	43	Carter Anchors	So
PK	46	Chad Levin	Sr

Head coach

- Tim Beck

Coordinators/assistant coaches

- See coaching staff

Legend

- (C) Team captain
- (S) Suspended
- (I) Ineligible
- Injured
- Redshirt

Roster
Last update: 2016-08-20

== Schedule ==
Date	Time	Opponent	Site	TV	Result	Attendance
September 1	7:00 pm	Central Missouri	Carnie Smith Stadium; Pittsburg, KS		L 27–34	9,311
September 8	7:00 pm	at Central Oklahoma	Wantland Stadium; Edmond, OK		W 45–31	6,218
September 17	7:00 pm	Northeastern State	Carnie Smith Stadium; Pittsburg, KS		W 38–37 ^{OT}	11,495
September 24	6:00 pm	at Lindenwood	Harlen C. Hunter Stadium; St. Charles, MO		W 50–19	3,088
October 1	1:00 pm	at Washburn	Yager Stadium; Topeka, KS		W 45–27	6,323
October 8	2:00 pm	Fort Hays State^{†}	Carnie Smith Stadium; Pittsburg, KS		L 41–54	10,238
October 15	2:00 pm	at Missouri Western	Spratt Stadium; St. Joseph, MO		W 55–47	5,515
October 22	2:00 pm	No. 12 Emporia State	Carnie Smith Stadium; Pittsburg, KS		L 36–41	8,763
October 29	2:30 pm	at No. 1 Northwest Missouri State	Bearcat Stadium; Maryville, MO (Rivalry)	American Sports Network	L 10–69	10,283
November 5	2:00 pm	Nebraska–Kearney	Carnie Smith Stadium; Pittsburg, KS		W 52–21	8,253
November 12	3:30 pm	at Missouri Southern	Fred G. Hughes Stadium; Joplin, MO (Miner's Bowl)		W 45–31	5,748
^{†}Homecoming; Rankings from Coaches' Poll released prior to the game; All times are in Central time

=== Game summaries ===
==== Central Missouri ====
Central Missouri at Pittsburg State

Team	1	2	3	4	Total
• Central Missouri	0	7	20	7	34
Pittsburg State	10	3	0	14	27

- Date: September 1
- Location: Carnie Smith Stadium, Pittsburg, KS
- Game start: 7:00 pm CDT
- Elapsed time: 3:07
- Game attendance: 9,311
- Game weather: Clear, 72 °F (22 °C)
- Referee: Dwight Neibling

==== Central Oklahoma ====
Pittsburg State at Central Oklahoma

Team	1	2	3	4	Total
• Pittsburg State	3	21	7	14	45
Central Oklahoma	14	10	7	0	31

- Date: September 8
- Location: Wantland Stadium, Edmond, OK
- Game start: 7:00 pm CDT
- Elapsed time: 2:56
- Game attendance: 6,218
- Game weather: Cloudy, 78 °F (26 °C)
- Referee: Craig Helser

==== Northeastern State ====
Northeastern State at Pittsburg State

Team	1	2	3	4	OT	Total
Northeastern State	7	14	7	3	6	37
• Pittsburg State	7	9	15	0	7	38

- Date: September 17
- Location: Carnie Smith Stadium, Pittsburg, KS
- Game start: 7:00 pm CDT
- Elapsed time: 3:37
- Game attendance: 11,495
- Game weather: Clear, 75 °F (24 °C)
- Referee: John Steiger

==== Lindenwood ====
Pittsburg State at Lindenwood

Team	1	2	3	4	Total
• Pittsburg State	13	14	9	14	50
Lindenwood	0	13	6	0	19

- Date: September 24
- Location: Harlen C. Hunter Stadium, St. Charles, MO
- Game start: 6:00 pm CDT
- Elapsed time: 3:12
- Game attendance: 3,088
- Game weather: Sunny, 86 °F (30 °C)
- Referee: Lonnie Brickman

==== Washburn ====
Pittsburg State at Washburn

Team	1	2	3	4	Total
• Pittsburg State	7	14	14	10	45
Washburn	10	3	7	7	27

- Date: October 1
- Location: Yager Stadium, Topeka, KS
- Game start: 1:00 pm CDT
- Elapsed time: 3:15
- Game attendance: 6,323
- Game weather: Calm, 68 °F (20 °C)
- Referee: Danny Harris

==== Fort Hays State ====
Fort Hays State at Pittsburg State

Team	1	2	3	4	Total
• Fort Hays State	10	14	14	16	54
Pittsburg State	14	6	7	14	41

- Date: October 8
- Location: Carnie Smith Stadium, Pittsburg, KS
- Game start: 2:00 pm CDT
- Elapsed time: 3:08
- Game attendance: 10,238
- Game weather: Clear, 69 °F (21 °C)
- Referee: Lonnie Brickman

==== Missouri Western ====
Pittsburg State at Missouri Western

Team	1	2	3	4	Total
• Pittsburg State	14	20	14	7	55
Missouri Western	12	7	7	21	47

- Date: October 15
- Location: Spratt Stadium, St. Joseph, MO
- Game start: 2:00 pm CDT
- Elapsed time: 3:00
- Game attendance: 5,515
- Game weather: Overcast, 72 °F (22 °C)
- Referee: Dwight Neibling

==== Emporia State ====
Emporia State at Pittsburg State

Team	1	2	3	4	Total
• #12 Emporia State	14	17	0	10	41
Pittsburg State	17	7	0	12	36

- Date: October 22
- Location: Carnie Smith Stadium, Pittsburg, KS
- Game start: 2:00 pm CDT
- Elapsed time: 3:29
- Game attendance: 8,763
- Game weather: Clear, 73 °F (23 °C)
- Referee: Craig Helser

==== Northwest Missouri State ====
Pittsburg State at Northwest Missouri State

Team	1	2	3	4	Total
Pittsburg State	0	3	7	0	10
• #1 Northwest Missouri State	14	27	14	14	69

- Date: October 29
- Location: Bearcat Stadium, Maryville, MO
- Game start: 2:30 pm CDT
- Elapsed time: 3:12
- Game attendance: 10,283
- Game weather: Sunny, 70 °F (21 °C)
- Referee: John Adams
- Television network: American Sports Network

==== Nebraska–Kearney ====
Nebraska–Kearney at Pittsburg State

Team	1	2	3	4	Total
Nebraska–Kearney	7	14	0	0	21
• Pittsburg State	7	24	14	7	52

- Date: November 5
- Location: Carnie Smith Stadium, Pittsburg, KS
- Game start: 2:00 pm CDT
- Elapsed time: 3:01
- Game attendance: 8,253
- Game weather: Overcast, 67 °F (19 °C)
- Referee: Brian Moore

==== Missouri Southern ====
Pittsburg State at Missouri Southern

Team	1	2	3	4	Total
• Pittsburg State	14	3	14	14	45
Missouri Southern	0	7	14	10	31

- Date: November 12
- Location: Fred G. Hughes Stadium, Joplin, MO
- Game start: 3:30 pm CST
- Elapsed time: 3:11
- Game attendance: 5,748
- Game weather: Clear, 63 °F (17 °C)
- Referee: Lonnie Brickman
