= 2016 Washburn Ichabods football team =

American college football season

2016 Washburn Ichabods football

Mineral Water Bowl, L 23–36 vs. Bemidji State
- Conference: Mid-America Intercollegiate Athletics Association
- Record: 7–5 (7–4 MIAA)
- Head coach: Craig Schurig (15th season)
- Offensive coordinator: Jeff Schwinn (6th season)
- Defensive coordinator: Brock Luke (6th year); Zach Watkins (3rd year)
- Home stadium: Yager Stadium at Moore Bowl

2016 Mid-America Intercollegiate Athletics Association football standings
	Conf.			Overall
Team	W		L	W		L
No. 1 NW Missouri State $^	11	–	0	15	–	0
No. 10 Emporia State ^	10	–	1	11	–	2
No. 21 Central Missouri ^	9	–	2	9	–	3
Fort Hays State #	7	–	4	8	–	4
Pittsburg State	7	–	4	7	–	4
Washburn #	7	–	4	7	–	5
Missouri Western	4	–	7	4	–	7
Central Oklahoma	3	–	8	3	–	8
Lindenwood	3	–	8	3	–	8
Missouri Southern	2	–	9	2	–	9
Northeastern State	2	–	9	2	–	9
Nebraska–Kearney	1	–	10	1	–	10
$ – Conference champion; ^ – NCAA Division II playoff participant; # – bowl participant (Wahsburn: Mineral Water Bowl, Fort Hays State: C.H.A.M.P.S. Heart of Texas Bowl; Rankings from AFCA poll)

The 2016 Washburn Ichabods football team represented Washburn University in the 2016 NCAA Division II football season. The Ichabods played their home games on Foster Field in Yager Stadium at Moore Bowl in Topeka, Kansas, as they have done since 1928. 2016 was the 126th season in school history. The Ichabods were led by fifteenth-year head coach, Craig Schurig. Washburn has been a member of the Mid-America Intercollegiate Athletics Association since 1989.

== Preseason ==
The Ichabods entered the 2016 season after finishing with a 5–6 record overall and in conference play, under Schurig. On August 2, 2016 at the MIAA Football Media Day, the Ichabods were chosen to finish in 8th place in both the Coaches Poll and in the Media Poll.

== Personnel ==
=== Coaching staff ===
Along with Schurig, there were 11 assistants.

Name	Position	Seasons at WU	Alma Mater
Craig Schurig	Head coach/QB's	15	Colorado Mines (1987)
Zach Watkins	Co-Defensive Coord./Special Teams	3	Washburn (2009)
Brock Luke	Co-Defensive Coord./Defensive Line	6	Clarion (2005)
Jeff Schwinn	Offensive Coord./Running Backs	6	Kansas State (2006)
Eric Eisenbarth	Assist. Coach – Offensive Line	6	Washburn (2008)
Josh Osborne	Assist. Coach – WR/Recruiting Coord.	7	Washburn (2009)
LaRon Moore	Assist. Coach – Defensive Backs	5	Texas Tech (2011)
David Trupp	Strength & Conditioning Coach	14	Baker (1991)
Frank Crosson	Volunteer Coach – Linebackers	11	Ottawa (1977)
Skyler Parker	Graduate Assistant – Defensive Backs	2	Ottawa (2012)
Kyle Duncan	Graduate Assistant – Offensive Line	2	Washburn (2014)
T.D. Hicks	Volunteer Coach	11	Houston Bible Institute (2010)

=== Roster ===
2016 Washburn Ichabods football team roster
Players
Coaches
Offense

Pos.	#	Name	Class
RB	2	Wesley Collins	Jr
WR	3	Jake Horner	So
WR	6	Carey Woods	Jr
QB	7	Will Bolster	So
WR	8	James Brania-Hopp	So
WR	10	Tyrell Brown	Sr
QB	11	Derek McGinnis	Sr
QB	12	Logan Twehous	Fr
WR	14	Bryce Chavis	Sr
WR	15	Will Hamilton	So
WR	17	Blake Peterson	Fr
QB	18	Cody Summers	Fr
RB	20	Mickeel Stewart	Sr
WR	21	Anthony Daniels, Jr.	Sr
RB	29	Curtis Whitten	Fr
RB	30	Isaiah Ming	Jr
RB	31	Kenyatte Harris, Jr.	Fr
RB	37	Malik Veal	Jr
RB	38	Chris McGee, Jr.	Jr
FB	42	Jackson Kirby	Fr
FB	45	Logan Lexow	So
FB	46	Joe Lewis	Fr
FB	49	Michael Shirk	Jr
OL	51	Cal Harris	Fr
OL	55	Saul Monteon	Sr
OL	57	Jake Riederer	Fr
OL	60	Zac Gillis	Sr
OL	61	Jacob Struber	Fr
OL	62	C.J. Donaldson	Fr
OL	64	Michael Miller	Sr
OL	66	Colton Dunkle	Fr
OL	68	Kyle Hinton	Fr
OL	73	Joe Ferron	Fr
OL	74	Trevon Allen	So
OL	76	Bob Marco	Jr
OL	77	Colin McKewon	So
OL	78	Jeremy Luck	Fr
TE	80	Marcus Meier	Fr
WR	81	Riley Davis	Jr
TE	82	Alex Wilson	Fr
TE	83	Michael Lickteig	So
TE	84	Semaj Johnson	So
WR	85	Austen Hubert	Fr
WR	86	Blake Kitrell	Jr
TE	87	Kelton Fisher	Fr
WR	88	Jace Williams	Fr

Defense

Pos.	#	Name	Class
DB	1	Corey Ballentine	So
LB	4	Derrick McGreevy	So
LB	5	Cody Heiman	Sr
DB	13	Jamel Johnson	Fr
LB	16	Nathan Mikloeit	Fr
S	19	Trey Merritt	So
DB	22	Keaton Cofield	Sr
FS	23	Trevin Wiens	Sr
DB	24	Zach Franklin	Sr
S	26	Peter Pfannenstiel	Jr
S	27	Heath Tucker	Fr
LB	28	Cedric Gonzalez	Jr
DB	32	Josh Wright	Fr
LB	33	Austin Tillman	Jr
DB	34	Nick Foster	Jr
S	35	DeVonta Staples	Fr
LB	36	Kyle Emerick	Fr
DB	39	Alvin Houston	Fr
LB	40	DeJuan Gardenhire	Fr
DE	41	Kastin Spencer	Jr
FS	43	Chase Williams	Fr
DE	44	Akhmad Abdul-Razzaq	Sr
LB	47	Garret Barnett-Kruger	Fr
DT	56	Jalen Durham	Jr
DE	58	Rashade Chester	Fr
DT	90	Ricardo Olivieri	Jr
DL	91	Brandon Hughes	Jr
DT	92	Aaron Charleston	Jr
DT	94	Trey Parker	Jr
DE	95	Spenser Matthews	Sr
DT	97	Ardis Palmer	Sr
DE	98	Ian Martin	Fr
DT	99	Gary Wilson	So

Special teams

Pos.	#	Name	Class
P	25	Perry Schmiedeler	So
LS	48	Zach Downing	Jr
P	50	Jordan Hardy	Fr

Head coach

- Craig Schurig

Coordinators/assistant coaches

- See coaching staff

Legend

- (C) Team captain
- (S) Suspended
- (I) Ineligible
- Injured
- Redshirt

Roster
Last update: 2016-08-19

== Schedule ==
Date	Time	Opponent	Site	Result	Attendance
September 1	6:00 pm	Northeastern State	Yager Stadium at Moore Bowl; Topeka, KS	W 38–19	5,775
September 8	7:00 pm	at No. 1 Northwest Missouri State	Bearcat Stadium; Maryville, MO	L 7–41	7,501
September 17	6:00 pm	Lindenwood Lions	Yager Stadium; Topeka, KS	W 34–29	6,721
September 24	2:00 pm	at Nebraska–Kearney	Ron & Carol Cope Stadium; Kearney, NE	W 47–44 ^{3OT}	4,028
October 1	1:00 pm	Pittsburg State	Yager Stadium; Topeka, KS	L 27–45	6,323
October 8	3:00 pm	at Missouri Southern	Fred G. Hughes Stadium; Joplin, MO	W 45–13	5,674
October 15	1:00 pm	Fort Hays State	Yager Stadium; Topeka, KS	W 30–24	5,350
October 22	1:30 pm	at Central Missouri	Audrey J. Walton Stadium; Warrensburg, MO	L 27–29	9,138
October 29	1:00 pm	Missouri Western^{†}	Yager Stadium; Topeka, KS	W 16–13	6,023
November 5	2:00 pm	at Central Oklahoma	Wantland Stadium; Edmond, OK	W 31–28	5,334
November 12	2:00 pm	No. 9 Emporia State	Yager Stadium; Topeka, KS (Turnpike Tussle)	L 3–30	6,789
December 3	Noon	vs. Bemidji State*	Tiger Stadium; Excelsior Springs, MO (Mineral Water Bowl)	L 23–36	2,123
*Non-conference game; ^{†}Homecoming; Rankings from Coaches' Poll released prior to the game; All times are in Central time

=== Game notes, regular season ===
==== Northeastern State ====
Northeastern State at Washburn

Team	1	2	3	4	Total
Northeastern State	0	10	6	3	19
• Washburn	7	16	7	8	38

- Date: September 1
- Location: Yager Stadium at Moore Bowl, Topeka, KS
- Game start: 6:00 pm CDT
- Elapsed time: 3:25
- Game attendance: 5,775
- Game weather: Beautiful, Clear, 83°F
- Referee: John Adams

==== Northwest Missouri State ====
Washburn at Northwest Missouri State

Team	1	2	3	4	Total
Washburn	0	7	0	0	7
• #1 Northwest Missouri State	17	0	14	10	41

- Date: September 8
- Location: Bearcat Stadium, Maryville, MO
- Game start: 7:00 pm CST
- Elapsed time: 2:54
- Game attendance: 7,501
- Game weather: Overcast, 80°F
- Referee: Sean Johnston

==== Lindenwood ====
Lindenwood at Washburn

Team	1	2	3	4	Total
Lindenwood	7	6	0	16	29
• Washburn	7	27	0	0	34

- Date: September 17
- Location: Yager Stadium, Topeka, KS
- Game start: 6:00 pm CDT
- Elapsed time: 3:15
- Game attendance: 6,721
- Game weather: Calm, 83°F
- Referee: Dwight Neibling

==== Nebraska–Kearney ====
Washburn at Nebraska–Kearney

Team	1	2	3	4	OT	2OT	3OT	Total
• Washburn	3	3	14	7	7	7	6	47
Nebraska–Kearney	7	0	6	14	7	7	3	44

- Date: September 24
- Location: Ron & Carol Cope Stadium, Kearney, NE
- Game start: 2:00 pm CDT
- Elapsed time: 3:35
- Game attendance: 4,028
- Game weather: Calm, 65°F

==== Pittsburg State ====
Pittsburg State at Washburn

Team	1	2	3	4	Total
• Pittsburg State	7	14	14	10	45
Washburn	10	3	7	7	27

- Date: October 1
- Location: Yager Stadium, Topeka, KS
- Game start: 1:00 pm CDT
- Elapsed time: 3:15
- Game attendance: 6,323
- Game weather: Calm, 68°F
- Referee: Danny Harris

==== Missouri Southern ====
Washburn at Missouri Southern

Team	1	2	3	4	Total
• Washburn	3	7	14	21	45
Missouri Southern	0	0	0	13	13

- Date: October 8
- Location: Fred G. Hughes Stadium, Joplin, MO
- Game start: 3:00 pm CDT
- Elapsed time: 3:09
- Game attendance: 5,674
- Game weather: Clear, 71°F
- Referee: Dwight Neibling

==== Fort Hays State ====
Fort Hays State at Washburn

Team	1	2	3	4	Total
Fort Hays State	0	14	3	7	24
• Washburn	13	10	7	0	30

- Date: October 15
- Location: Yager Stadium, Topeka, KS
- Game start: 1:00 pm CDT
- Elapsed time: 3:05
- Game attendance: 5,350
- Game weather: Overcast, 72°F
- Referee: Sean Johnston

==== Central Missouri ====
Washburn at Central Missouri

Team	1	2	3	4	Total
Washburn	3	17	0	7	27
• Central Missouri	13	13	0	3	29

- Date: October 22
- Location: Audrey J. Walton Stadium, Warrensburg, MO
- Game start: 1:30 pm CDT
- Elapsed time: 3:10
- Game attendance: 9,138
- Game weather: Clear, 65°F
- Referee: Lonnie Brickman

==== Missouri Western ====
Missouri Western at Washburn

Team	1	2	3	4	Total
Missouri Western	6	7	0	0	13
• Washburn	3	7	6	0	16

- Date: October 29
- Location: Yager Stadium, Topeka, KS
- Game start: 1:00 pm CDT
- Elapsed time: 2:54
- Game attendance: 6,023
- Game weather: Sunny, 76°F
- Referee: Craig Helser

==== Central Oklahoma ====
Washburn at Central Oklahoma

Team	1	2	3	4	Total
• Washburn	7	10	14	0	31
Central Oklahoma	0	7	7	14	28

- Date: November 5
- Location: Wantland Stadium, Edmond, OK
- Game start: 2:00 pm CDT
- Elapsed time: 3:03
- Game attendance: 5,334
- Game weather: Partly cloudy, 70°F
- Referee: Dwight Neibling

==== Emporia State ====
Emporia State at Washburn

Team	1	2	3	4	Total
• #9 Emporia State	0	17	7	6	30
Washburn	0	3	0	0	3

- Date: November 12
- Location: Yager Stadium, Topeka, KS
- Game start: 2:00 pm CST
- Elapsed time: 2:53
- Game attendance: 6,789
- Game weather: Clear and sunny, 58°F
- Referee: Craig Helser

=== Game notes, post-season ===
==== Minnesota–Duluth ====
Washburn vs. Bemidji State

Team	1	2	3	4	Total
• Bemidji State	0	13	14	9	36
Washburn	10	0	10	3	23

- Date: November 19
- Location: Tiger Stadium, Excelsior Springs, MO
- Game start: Noon CST
- Elapsed time: 3:14
- Game attendance: 2,123
- Game weather: Overcast and chilly, 47°F
- Referee: Danny Harris
