= 2016 Missouri Southern Lions football team =

American college football season

2016 Missouri Southern Lions football
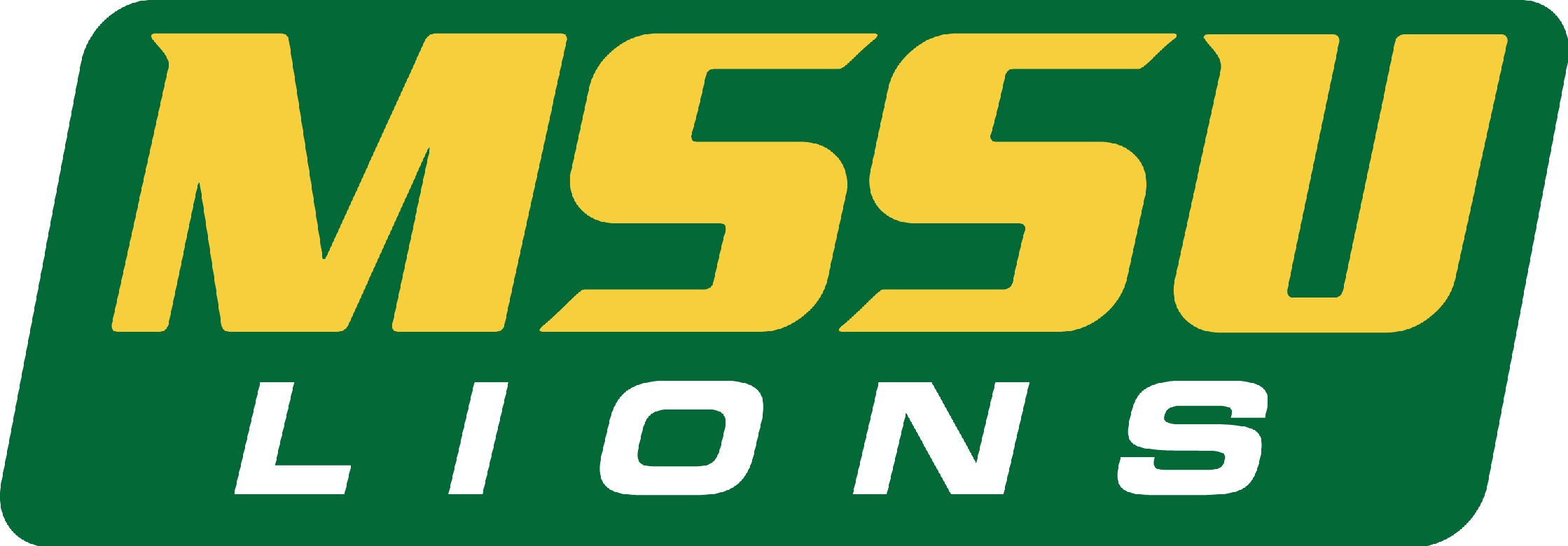
- Conference: Mid-America Intercollegiate Athletics Association
- Record: 2–8 (2–8 MIAA)
- Head coach: Denver Johnson (2nd season)
- Offensive coordinator: Corey Fipps (2nd season)
- Defensive coordinator: Kenny Evans (2nd season)
- Home stadium: Fred G. Hughes Stadium

2016 Mid-America Intercollegiate Athletics Association football standings
	Conf.			Overall
Team	W		L	W		L
No. 1 NW Missouri State $^	11	–	0	15	–	0
No. 10 Emporia State ^	10	–	1	11	–	2
No. 21 Central Missouri ^	9	–	2	9	–	3
Fort Hays State #	7	–	4	8	–	4
Pittsburg State	7	–	4	7	–	4
Washburn #	7	–	4	7	–	5
Missouri Western	4	–	7	4	–	7
Central Oklahoma	3	–	8	3	–	8
Lindenwood	3	–	8	3	–	8
Missouri Southern	2	–	9	2	–	9
Northeastern State	2	–	9	2	–	9
Nebraska–Kearney	1	–	10	1	–	10
$ – Conference champion; ^ – NCAA Division II playoff participant; # – bowl participant (Wahsburn: Mineral Water Bowl, Fort Hays State: C.H.A.M.P.S. Heart of Texas Bowl; Rankings from AFCA poll)

The 2016 Missouri Southern Lions football team represented Missouri Southern State University in the 2016 NCAA Division II football season. The Lions played their home games in Fred G. Hughes Stadium in Joplin, Missouri, as they have done since 1975. 2016 was the 48th season in school history. The Lions were led by second-year head coach, Denver Johnson. Missouri Southern has been a member of the Mid-America Intercollegiate Athletics Association since 1989.

== Preseason ==
The Lions entered the 2016 season after finishing in 11th place last season with a record of 1–10, under Johnson. On August 2, 2016 at the MIAA Football Media Day, the Lions were chosen to finish in 10th place in the Coaches Poll, and 11th in the Media Poll.

== Personnel ==
=== Coaching staff ===
Along with Johnson, there were 9 assistants.

Name	Position	Seasons at MSSU	Alma Mater
Denver Johnson	Head coach	2	Tulsa (1981)
Kenny Evans	Defensive Coordinator	2	Northeastern State (1982)
Corey Fipps	Offensive Coordinator	2	Harding (2004)
Charles Alexander	Defensive Backs/Recruiting Coordinator	2	Ohio State (2002)
Bill Bleil	Offensive Line	1	NM Highlands (1982)
Rashad Watson	Secondary	4	Alabama A&M (2002)
Bret Story	Wide Receivers	2	Newberry (2003)
Josh Dalton	Running Backs	2	Missouri Southern (2002)
Caleb Lewis	Kickers	2	Missouri Southern (1999)
Darius Hart	Defensive Line	1	Oklahoma State (2011)

=== Roster ===
2016 Missouri Southern Lions football team roster
Players
Coaches
Offense

Pos.	#	Name	Class
QB	1	T.J. Fleeton	Jr
QB	4	Brayden Scott	So
WR	10	Jordan Morrison	Sr
TE	11	Alex Crehan	Fr
WR	12	Jeff Shuster	Fr
WR	17	Scott Lathrop	Sr
RB	18	Jay Hadley	Sr
WR	19	Carson Day	So
WR	21	Terrell Crawford	Sr
RB	29	Del'shaun Higgins	Fr
RB	32	Justise Keith	So
RB	33	Brice Gahagans	Sr
WR	34	Chad Nolan	Sr
RB	46	Malcom Nelson, Jr.	Fr
OL	54	Jonathan Villanueva	Sr
OL	59	Mitch Moore	Sr
OL	61	Antonio Carranco	Sr
OL	63	David Dzierzega	Jr
OL	66	Cristian Mora	Sr
OL	68	Jonathan Boos	Sr
OL	71	Isaac Wold	Sr
OL	72	Seth Peterson	Sr
OL	73	Joe Brawner	Sr
OL	74	Lars Lindquist	Sr
OL	75	Jarrell Jackson	Jr
OL	76	Brock Whalen	Sr
WR	80	Brandon Martin	Jr
WR	82	Jocqui Davis	Sr
WR	83	Anthony Cannon	Sr
WR	89	Ben Evans	Sr

Defense

Pos.	#	Name	Class
CB	3	Ricky Green	Sr
CB	12	Brian Hanserd	Sr
LB	15	E.J. McKenzie	Sr
S	20	Chris Goss III	Sr
S	24	Idrissa Simpson	Sr
LB	27	Justin Legier	So
DB	30	Marquez Cohen	Sr
DB	36	Ben Belay	Fr
CB	37	Grady Howell	Jr
DE	42	Roderick Earvin	Sr
LB	46	Trevor Plafcan	So
LB	46	Devin Williams-Pennick	Jr
S	47	Garrick Fausett	So
DE	53	Dominique Nunez	Sr
DE	91	Chris Williams	Sr
DE	92	James Wooten	Sr
DT	93	Stephan Randall	Sr
DL	96	Jeremy Boykins	Sr
DE	98	Travelle Smith	Sr

Special teams

Pos.	#	Name	Class
K	39	Brock Renken	Jr
P	22	Kye Stoneham	Sr
P	25	Stetson Broce	Sr

Head coach

- Denver Johnson

Coordinators/assistant coaches

- See coaching staff

Legend

- (C) Team captain
- (S) Suspended
- (I) Ineligible
- Injured
- Redshirt

Roster
Last update: 2016-08-04

== Schedule ==
Date	Time	Opponent	Site	Result	Attendance
September 1	7:00 pm	at Fort Hays State	Lewis Field Stadium; Hays, KS	L 10–22	4,134
September 10	6:00 pm	Missouri Western	Fred G. Hughes Stadium; Joplin, MO	L 14–51	4,274
September 17	2:00 pm	at Emporia State	Francis G. Welch Stadium; Emporia, KS	L 21–49	5,304
September 24	6:00 pm	No. 1 Northwest Missouri State	Fred G. Hughes Stadium; Joplin, MO	L 21–45	5,267
October 1	2:00 pm	at Nebraska–Kearney	Ron & Carol Cope Stadium; Kearney, NE	W 24–14	2,005
October 8	3:00 pm	Washburn^{†}	Fred G. Hughes Stadium; Joplin, MO	L 13–45	5,674
October 15	6:00 pm	Central Missouri	Fred G. Hughes Stadium; Joplin, MO	L 7–56	2,526
October 22	2:00 pm	at Central Oklahoma	Wantland Stadium; Edmond, OK	L 42–63	1,985
October 29	2:00 pm	Northeastern State	Fred G. Hughes Stadium; Joplin, MO	W 45–33	4,236
November 5	1:30 pm	at Lindenwood	Harlen C. Hunter Stadium; St. Charles, MO	L 28–42	1,563
November 12	3:30 pm	Pittsburg State	Fred G. Hughes Stadium; Joplin, MO (Miner's Bowl)	L 31–45	5,748
^{†}Homecoming; Rankings from American Football Coaches Association Poll released prior to the game; All times are in Central time

== Game summaries ==
=== Fort Hays State ===
Missouri Southern at Fort Hays State

Team	1	2	3	4	Total
Missouri Southern	0	3	7	0	10
• Fort Hays State	7	6	6	3	22

- Date: September 1
- Location: Lewis Field Stadium, Hays, KS
- Game start: 7:00 pm CDT
- Elapsed time: 2:54
- Game attendance: 4,134
- Game weather: Sunny and Breezy, 79 °F (26 °C)
- Referee: Lonnie Brickman

=== Missouri Western ===
Missouri Western at Missouri Southern

Team	1	2	3	4	Total
• Missouri Western	7	21	6	17	51
Missouri Southern	0	6	2	6	14

- Date: September 10
- Location: Hughes Stadium, Joplin, MO
- Game start: 6:00 pm CDT
- Elapsed time: 2:45
- Game attendance: 2,474
- Game weather: Overcast, 72 °F (22 °C)
- Referee: Dwight Neibling

=== Emporia State ===
Missouri Southern at Emporia State

Team	1	2	3	4	Total
Missouri Southern	0	7	7	7	21
• Emporia State	28	14	7	0	49

- Date: September 17
- Location: Welch Stadium, Emporia, KS
- Game start: 2:00 pm CDT
- Elapsed time: 2:57
- Game attendance: 5,304
- Game weather: Sunny, 77 °F (25 °C)
- Referee: John Adams

=== Northwest Missouri State ===
Northwest Missouri State at Missouri Southern

Team	1	2	3	4	Total
• #1 Northwest Missouri State	0	28	7	10	45
Missouri Southern	13	0	8	0	21

- Date: September 24
- Location: Hughes Stadium, Joplin, MO
- Game start: 6:00 pm CDT
- Elapsed time: 2:58
- Game attendance: 5,267
- Game weather: Partly Cloudy, 85 °F (29 °C)
- Referee: Danny Harris

=== Nebraska–Kearney ===
Missouri Southern at Nebraska–Kearney

Team	1	2	3	4	Total
• Missouri Southern	14	0	3	7	24
Nebraska–Kearney	0	7	0	7	14

- Date: October 1
- Location: Ron & Carol Cope Stadium, Kearney, NE
- Game start: 2:00 pm CDT
- Elapsed time: 3:10
- Game attendance: 2,005
- Game weather: Clear, 75 °F (24 °C)
- Referee: John Steiger

=== Washburn ===
Washburn at Missouri Southern

Team	1	2	3	4	Total
• Washburn	3	7	14	21	45
Missouri Southern	0	0	0	13	13

- Date: October 8
- Location: Hughes Stadium, Joplin, MO
- Game start: 3:00 pm CDT
- Elapsed time: 3:09
- Game attendance: 5,674
- Game weather: Clear, 71 °F (22 °C)
- Referee: Dwight Neibling

=== Central Missouri ===
Central Missouri at Missouri Southern

Team	1	2	3	4	Total
• Central Missouri	14	28	7	7	56
Missouri Southern	7	0	0	0	7

- Date: October 15
- Location: Hughes Stadium, Joplin, MO
- Game start: 6:00 pm CDT
- Elapsed time: 2:52
- Game attendance: 2,526
- Game weather: Partly Cloudy, 77 °F (25 °C)
- Referee: Craig Helser

=== Central Oklahoma ===
Missouri Southern at Central Oklahoma

Team	1	2	3	4	Total
Missouri Southern	0	14	7	21	42
• Central Oklahoma	14	21	7	21	63

- Date: October 22
- Location: Wantland Stadium, Edmond, OK
- Game start: 2:00 pm CDT
- Elapsed time: 3:10
- Game attendance: 1,985
- Game weather: Sunny, 79 °F (26 °C)
- Referee: Brian Moore

=== Northeastern State ===
Northeastern State at Missouri Southern

Team	1	2	3	4	Total
Northeastern State	10	3	0	20	33
• Missouri Southern	7	14	10	14	45

- Date: October 29
- Location: Hughes Stadium, Joplin, MO
- Game start: 2:00 pm CDT
- Elapsed time: 3:24
- Game attendance: 4,236
- Game weather: Mostly sunny, 80 °F (27 °C)
- Referee: Sean Johnston

=== Lindenwood ===
Missouri Southern at Lindenwood

Team	1	2	3	4	Total
Missouri Southern	7	0	7	14	28
• Lindenwood	0	21	7	14	42

- Date: November 5
- Location: Harlen C. Hunter Stadium, St. Charles, MO
- Game start: 1:30 pm CDT
- Elapsed time: 2:57
- Game attendance: 1,563
- Game weather: Partly cloudy, 63 °F (17 °C)
- Referee: John Steiger

== Pittsburg State ==
Pittsburg State at Missouri Southern

Team	1	2	3	4	Total
• Pittsburg State	14	3	14	14	45
Missouri Southern	0	7	14	10	31

- Date: November 12
- Location: Hughes Stadium, Joplin, MO
- Game start: 3:30 pm CST
- Elapsed time: 3:11
- Game attendance: 5,748
- Game weather: Clear, 63 °F (17 °C)
- Referee: Lonnie Brickman
