= 2016 Northeastern State RiverHawks football team =

American college football season

2016 Northeastern State RiverHawks football
- Conference: Mid-America Intercollegiate Athletics Association
- Record: 2–9 (2–9 MIAA)
- Head coach: Rob Robinson (3rd season)
- Offensive coordinator: Dane Simoneau (2nd season)
- Offensive scheme: Spread
- Defensive coordinator: Josh Lattimer (3rd season)
- Base defense: 3–3–5
- Home stadium: Doc Wadley Stadium

2016 Mid-America Intercollegiate Athletics Association football standings
	Conf.			Overall
Team	W		L	W		L
No. 1 NW Missouri State $^	11	–	0	15	–	0
No. 10 Emporia State ^	10	–	1	11	–	2
No. 21 Central Missouri ^	9	–	2	9	–	3
Fort Hays State #	7	–	4	8	–	4
Pittsburg State	7	–	4	7	–	4
Washburn #	7	–	4	7	–	5
Missouri Western	4	–	7	4	–	7
Central Oklahoma	3	–	8	3	–	8
Lindenwood	3	–	8	3	–	8
Missouri Southern	2	–	9	2	–	9
Northeastern State	2	–	9	2	–	9
Nebraska–Kearney	1	–	10	1	–	10
$ – Conference champion; ^ – NCAA Division II playoff participant; # – bowl participant (Wahsburn: Mineral Water Bowl, Fort Hays State: C.H.A.M.P.S. Heart of Texas Bowl; Rankings from AFCA poll)

The 2016 Northeastern State RiverHawks football team represented Northeastern State University in the 2016 NCAA Division II football season. The RiverHawks played their home games on Gable Field in Doc Wadley Stadium in Tahlequah, Oklahoma, as they have done since 1915. 2016 was the 102nd season in school history. The RiverHawks were led by third-year head coach, Rob Robinson. Northeastern State has been a member of the Mid-America Intercollegiate Athletics Association since 2012.

== Preseason ==
The RiverHawks entered the 2016 season after finishing 3–8 both overall and in conference play in 2015. On August 2, 2016 at the MIAA Football Media Day, the RiverHawks were chosen to finish in 9th place in the Coaches Poll, and 10th in the Media Poll.

== Schedule ==
Date	Time	Opponent	Site	Result	Attendance
September 1	6:00 pm	at Washburn	Yager Stadium at Moore Bowl; Topeka, KS	L 19–38	5,775
September 8	7:00 pm	Lindenwood	Doc Wadley Stadium; Tahlequah, OK	W 35–31	2,104
September 17	7:00 pm	at Pittsburg State	Carnie Smith Stadium; Pittsburg, KS	L 37–38 ^{OT}	11,495
September 24	1:00 pm	Fort Hays State^{†}	Doc Wadley Stadium; Tahlequah, OK	L 7–34	2,256
October 1	1:00 pm	at Missouri Western	Spratt Stadium; St. Joseph, MO	L 14–45	3,682
October 8	2:00 pm	No. 18 Emporia State	Doc Wadley Stadium; Tahlequah, OK	L 27–47	1,503
October 15	1:30 pm	at No. 1 NW Missouri State	Bearcat Stadium; Maryville, MO	L 29–74	7,296
October 22	2:00 pm	Nebraska–Kearney	Doc Wadley Stadium; Tahlequah, OK	W 31–21	1,187
October 29	2:00 pm	at Missouri Southern	Fred G. Hughes Stadium; Joplin, MO	L 33–45	4,236
November 5	2:00 pm	No. 25 Central Missouri	Doc Wadley Stadium; Tahlequah, OK	L 21–59	3,250
November 12	3:00 pm	at Central Oklahoma	Wantland Stadium; Edmond, OK (rivalry)	L 14–17	4,223
^{†}Homecoming; Rankings from AFCA Poll released prior to the game; All times are in Central time

== Game summaries ==
=== At Washburn ===
Northeastern State at Washburn

Team	1	2	3	4	Total
RiverHawks	0	10	6	3	19
• Ichabods	7	16	7	8	38

- Date: September 1
- Location: Yager Stadium at Moore Bowl
  Topeka, Kansas
- Game start: 7:00 pm CDT
- Elapsed time: 3:25
- Game attendance: 5,775
- Game weather: Beautiful, Clear, 83 °F (28 °C)
- Referee: John Adams

Statistics	NESU	WASH
First downs	24	22
Total yards	401	535
Rushing yards	118	211
Passing yards	283	324
Turnovers	1	1
Time of possession	28:08	31:52

Team	Category	Player	Statistics
Northeastern State	Passing	Dimonic McKinzy	23/44, 283 yards, TD
Northeastern State	Rushing	Ra'Keim Abdul	16 rushes, 61 yards
Northeastern State	Receiving	Gary McKnight	5 receptions, 68 yards
Washburn	Passing	Derek McGinnis	14/24, 275 yards, 2 TD
Washburn	Rushing	Mickeel Stewart	10 rushes, 53 yards, TD
Washburn	Receiving	Jake Horner	4 receptions, 158 yards, TD

=== Lindenwood ===
Lindenwood at Northeastern State

Team	1	2	3	4	Total
Lions	7	3	14	7	31
• RiverHawks	7	7	7	14	35

- Date: September 8
- Location: Doc Wadley Stadium
  Tahlequah, Oklahoma
- Game start: 7:00 pm CDT
- Elapsed time: 3:31
- Game attendance: 2,104
- Game weather: Partly Cloudy, 88 °F (31 °C)
- Referee: Brian Moore

Statistics	LWU	NESU
First downs	23	24
Total yards	434	420
Rushing yards	221	120
Passing yards	213	300
Turnovers	5	2
Time of possession	29:01	30:59

Team	Category	Player	Statistics
Lindenwood	Passing	Mason Bendigo	19/40, 213 yards, TD, 4 INT
Lindenwood	Rushing	Calen Campbell	24 rushes, 146 yards, TD
Lindenwood	Receiving	Deantrell Prince	7 receptions, 87 yards, TD
Northeastern State	Passing	Dimonic McKinzy	23/47, 300 yards, 5 TD
Northeastern State	Rushing	Dimonic McKinzy	10 rushes, 38 yards
Northeastern State	Receiving	Gary McKnight	5 receptions, 99 yards, 3 TD

=== At Pittsburg State ===
Northeastern State at Pittsburg State

Team	1	2	3	4	OT	Total
RiverHawks	7	14	7	3	6	37
• Gorillas	7	9	15	0	7	38

- Date: September 17
- Location: Carnie Smith Stadium
  Pittsburg, Kansas
- Game start: 7:00 pm CDT
- Elapsed time: 3:37
- Game attendance: 11,495
- Game weather: Clear, 75 °F (24 °C)
- Referee: John Steiger

Statistics	NESU	PSU
First downs	19	24
Total yards	447	457
Rushing yards	117	171
Passing yards	330	286
Turnovers	0	2
Time of possession	27:54	32:06

Team	Category	Player	Statistics
Northeastern State	Passing	Dimonic McKinzy	16/31, 311 yards, 2 TD
Northeastern State	Rushing	C. J. Shavers	23 rushes, 96 yards, 2 TD
Northeastern State	Receiving	Gary McKnight	4 receptions, 140 yards, TD
Pittsburg State	Passing	Thomas LePage	20/37, 286 yards, 3 TD, INT
Pittsburg State	Rushing	Thomas LePage	17 rushes, 78 yards, TD
Pittsburg State	Receiving	Levi Copelin	6 receptions, 100 yards, 3 TD

=== Fort Hays State ===
Fort Hays State at Northeastern State

Team	1	2	3	4	Total
• Tigers	0	17	7	10	34
RiverHawks	0	0	7	0	7

- Date: September 24
- Location: Doc Wadley Stadium
  Tahlequah, Oklahoma
- Game start: 1:00 pm CDT
- Elapsed time: 2:51
- Game attendance: 2,526
- Game weather: Clear, 75 °F (24 °C)
- Referee: Dwight Neibling

Statistics	FHSU	NESU
First downs	17	15
Total yards	323	207
Rushing yards	138	86
Passing yards	185	121
Turnovers	1	3
Time of possession	25:37	34:23

Team	Category	Player	Statistics
Fort Hays State	Passing	Jacob Mezera	17/28, 185 yards
Fort Hays State	Rushing	Shaquille Cooper	12 rushes, 89 yards, TD
Fort Hays State	Receiving	Tyler Bacon	4 receptions, 51 yards
Northeastern State	Passing	Dimonic McKinzy	11/28, 121 yards, TD, 3 INT
Northeastern State	Rushing	Deion Tidwell	12 rushes, 37 yards
Northeastern State	Receiving	Rashawn Eubanks	3 receptions, 53 yards, TD

=== At Missouri Western ===
Northeastern State at Missouri Western

Team	1	2	3	4	Total
RiverHawks	0	0	0	14	14
• Griffons	14	10	14	7	45

- Date: October 1
- Location: Spratt Stadium
  St. Joseph, Missouri
- Game start: 1:00 pm CDT
- Elapsed time: 2:40
- Game attendance: 3,682
- Game weather: Overcast, 65 °F (18 °C)
- Referee: Sean Johnston

Statistics	NESU	MWSU
First downs	11	26
Total yards	280	498
Rushing yards	65	281
Passing yards	215	217
Turnovers	4	2
Time of possession	26:10	33:50

Team	Category	Player	Statistics
Northeastern State	Passing	Dimonic McKinzy	10/24, 146 yards, 3 INT
Northeastern State	Rushing	C. J. Shavers	7 rushes, 31 yards
Northeastern State	Receiving	Gary McKnight	3 receptions, 79 yards
Missouri Western	Passing	Skyler Windmiller	9/15, 199 yards, TD
Missouri Western	Rushing	Josh Caldwell	22 rushes, 123 yards, TD
Missouri Western	Receiving	Jesse Dickens	2 receptions, 75 yards, TD

=== No. 18 Emporia State ===
Emporia State at Northeastern State

Team	1	2	3	4	Total
• No. 18 Hornets	16	14	10	7	47
RiverHawks	13	7	0	7	27

- Date: October 8
- Location: Doc Wadley Stadium
  Tahlequah, Oklahoma
- Game start: 2:00 pm CDT
- Elapsed time: 3:13
- Game attendance: 1,503
- Game weather: Sunny, 73 °F (23 °C)
- Referee: John Adams

Statistics	ESU	NESU
First downs	28	23
Total yards	450	390
Rushing yards	203	74
Passing yards	247	316
Turnovers	1	5
Time of possession	32:29	27:31

Team	Category	Player	Statistics
Emporia State	Passing	Braxton Marstall	22/31, 211 yards, INT
Emporia State	Rushing	Landon Nault	12 rushes, 67 yards
Emporia State	Receiving	Jordan Jackson	6 receptions, 60 yards
Northeastern State	Passing	Dimonic McKinzy	19/37, 279 yards, 3 TD, 3 INT
Northeastern State	Rushing	Deion Tidwell	5 rushes, 27 yards
Northeastern State	Receiving	Antonio King	5 receptions, 104 yards, TD

=== At No. 1 NW Missouri State ===
Northeastern State at Northwest Missouri State

Team	1	2	3	4	Total
RiverHawks	6	9	14	0	29
• No. 1 Bearcats	21	25	21	7	74

- Date: October 15
- Location: Bearcat Stadium
  Maryville, Missouri
- Game start: 1:30 pm CDT
- Elapsed time: 3:07
- Game attendance: 7,296
- Game weather: Overcast, 70 °F (21 °C)
- Referee: Sean Johnston

Statistics	NESU	NWMSU
First downs	17	32
Total yards	360	662
Rushing yards	42	371
Passing yards	318	291
Turnovers	1	2
Time of possession	25:52	34:08

Team	Category	Player	Statistics
Northeastern State	Passing	Dimonic McKinzy	10/23, 263 yards, 4 TD
Northeastern State	Rushing	Dimonic McKinzy	3 rushes, 18 yards
Northeastern State	Receiving	Gary McKnight	5 receptions, 136 yards, 3 TD
NW Missouri State	Passing	Kyle Zimmerman	16/22, 270 yards, 5 TD
NW Missouri State	Rushing	Phil Jackson	12 rushes, 112 yards
NW Missouri State	Receiving	Shawn Bane	4 receptions, 157 yards, 2 TD

=== Nebraska–Kearney ===
Nebraska–Kearney at Northeastern State

Team	1	2	3	4	Total
Lopers	0	0	14	7	21
• RiverHawks	10	7	7	7	31

- Date: October 22
- Location: Doc Wadley Stadium
  Tahlequah, Oklahoma
- Game start: 2:00 pm CDT
- Elapsed time: 3:05
- Game attendance: 1,187
- Game weather: Sunny, 73 °F (23 °C)
- Referee: John Steiger

Statistics	UNK	NESU
First downs	20	24
Total yards	357	464
Rushing yards	88	171
Passing yards	269	293
Turnovers	2	0
Time of possession	25:29	34:31

Team	Category	Player	Statistics
Nebraska–Kearney	Passing	Steve Worthing	19/34, 269 yards, INT
Nebraska–Kearney	Rushing	Luke Quinn	22 rushes, 94 yards, 2 TD
Nebraska–Kearney	Receiving	Malcolm Moore	8 receptions, 132 yards
Northeastern State	Passing	Dimonic McKinzy	15/31, 293 yards, 3 TD, INT
Northeastern State	Rushing	Ra'Keim Abdul	28 rushes, 93 yards, TD
Northeastern State	Receiving	Zac King	5 receptions, 93 yards

=== At Missouri Southern ===
Northeastern State at Missouri Southern

Team	1	2	3	4	Total
RiverHawks	10	3	0	20	33
• Lions	7	14	10	14	45

- Date: October 29
- Location: Fred G. Hughes Stadium
  Joplin, Missouri
- Game start: 2:00 pm CDT
- Elapsed time: 3:24
- Game attendance: 4,236
- Game weather: Mostly sunny, 80 °F (27 °C)
- Referee: Sean Johnston

Statistics	NESU	MSSU
First downs	26	24
Total yards	481	521
Rushing yards	150	251
Passing yards	331	270
Turnovers	4	1
Time of possession	26:59	33:01

Team	Category	Player	Statistics
Northeastern State	Passing	Dimonic McKinzy	25/50, 331 yards, 2 TD, 2 INT
Northeastern State	Rushing	Ra'Keim Abdul	13 rushes, 82 yards, TD
Northeastern State	Receiving	Gary McKnight	8 receptions, 92 yards
Missouri Southern	Passing	Brayden Scott	21/36, 270 yards, 3 TD, INT
Missouri Southern	Rushing	Josh Hadley	21 rushes, 145 yards, TD
Missouri Southern	Receiving	Josiah Bennett	3 receptions, 85 yards, TD

=== No. 25 Central Missouri ===
Central Missouri at Northeastern State

Team	1	2	3	4	Total
• No. 25 Mules	21	10	14	14	59
RiverHawks	0	0	7	14	21

- Date: November 5
- Location: Doc Wadley Stadium
  Tahlequah, Oklahoma
- Game start: 2:00 pm CDT
- Elapsed time: 2:50
- Game attendance: 3,250
- Game weather: Sunny, 70 °F (21 °C)
- Referee: John Adams

Statistics	UCM	NESU
First downs	21	18
Total yards	436	289
Rushing yards	166	53
Passing yards	270	236
Turnovers	2	2
Time of possession	32:15	27:45

Team	Category	Player	Statistics
Central Missouri	Passing	Garrett Fugate	16/28, 252 yards, 3 TD, INT
Central Missouri	Rushing	Gabe Vandiver	16 rushes, 73 yards
Central Missouri	Receiving	Kyle Echols	5 receptions, 132 yards
Northeastern State	Passing	Dimonic McKinzy	18/42, 236 yards, 3 TD, 2 INT
Northeastern State	Rushing	Ra'Keim Abdul	13 rushes, 48 yards
Northeastern State	Receiving	Gary McKnight	5 receptions, 99 yards, 2 TD

=== At Central Oklahoma ===
Northeastern State at Central Oklahoma

Team	1	2	3	4	Total
RiverHawks	0	7	7	0	14
• Bronchos	7	0	3	7	17

- Date: November 12
- Location: Wantland Stadium
  Edmond, Oklahoma
- Game start: 3:00 pm CST
- Elapsed time: 3:00
- Game attendance: 4,223
- Game weather: Sunny, 65 °F (18 °C)
- Referee: Craig Helser

Statistics	NESU	UCO
First downs	19	30
Total yards	322	498
Rushing yards	118	198
Passing yards	204	300
Turnovers	2	2
Time of possession	21:47	38:13

Team	Category	Player	Statistics
Northeastern State	Passing	Dimonic McKinzy	19/32, 204 yards, 2 TD, INT
Northeastern State	Rushing	C. J. Shavers	13 rushes, 71 yards
Northeastern State	Receiving	Matthew Butler	3 receptions, 62 yards, TD
Central Oklahoma	Passing	T. J. Eckert	28/45, 300 yards, TD, INT
Central Oklahoma	Rushing	Clay McKenzie	31 rushes, 145 yards, TD
Central Oklahoma	Receiving	Connor Pulley	9 receptions, 161 yards

== Personnel ==
=== Coaching staff ===
Along with Robinson, there are 10 assistants.

Name	Position	Seasons at NSU	Alma Mater
Rob Robinson	Head coach	3	William Jewell (2000)
Josh Lattimer	Defensive Coordinator/Defensive Line	3	Pittsburg State (2007)
Rob Messinger	Special Teams/Recruiting Coord./Secondary	3	Kansas (2005)
Will Skeans	Linebackers	4	Drury (2005)
Dane Simoneau	Offensive Coordinator/Quarterbacks	3	Washburn (2013)
Julian Mendez	Assist. Coach – Offensive Line	2	Ottawa (2010)
Marvin Bohannon	Assist. Coach – Wide Receivers	3	Winston–Salem (2010)
Ryan Dvorak	Graduate Assistant – Tight Ends	2	Northeastern State (2013)
Mitch Buhler	Graduate Assistant – Running Backs	1	Washburn (2015)
Chris Girdner	Graduate Assistant – Defensive Line	1	Northeastern State (2014)
Jacques Washington	Graduate Assistant – Cornerbacks	1	Iowa State (2013)

=== Roster ===
2016 Northeastern State RiverHawks football team roster
Players
Coaches
Offense

Pos.	#	Name	Class
QB	1	Dimonic McKinzy	So
RB	3	Ra'Keim Abdul	Jr
QB	4	Kevin Pantastico	Sr
RB	6	Cody Busby	Sr
WR	7	Matthew Butler	Sr
RB	9	Mason McMillan	Sr
WR	13	Zac King	Jr
RB	14	Deion Tidwell	Jr
QB	15	Blayne Armstrong	So
QB	16	Daniel Davis	Fr
QB	17	Cameron Hudson	Fr
WR	18	Gary McKnight	Jr
RB	20	C.J. Shavers	Fr
WR	21	Antonio King	Sr
FB	27	Tracey Walker	Jr
FB	30	Michael Davis	Jr
RB	35	Keaton Burroughs	Fr
OL	50	Brian West	Sr
OL	51	Caleb Hash	Fr
OL	53	Tyler Easter	Sr
OL	55	Steve Youmans	Fr
OL	56	Damarii Tryon	Fr
OL	60	Austin Hitton	Fr
OL	62	Jason Staggs	Fr
OL	66	Dakota Ritchie	So
OL	67	Taylor Cooley	Sr
OL	68	Brian Hobbs	Sr
OL	69	Jordan Baldwin	Sr
OL	71	Isaac Barham	Fr
OL	72	Diesen Gorham	So
OL	74	Andrew Alvarado	Sr
OL	75	Austin Sargent	Fr
OL	77	Will Clements	Fr
OL	79	Morgan Lesslie	Fr
WR	80	Aaron Samek	Fr
WR	81	Donavan Dan	Sr
WR	82	Rashawn Eubanks	Fr
WR	83	Chris Cohen	Fr
TE	84	Jacob Drysdale	So
WR	85	Marcus Taylor	Fr
WR	86	Mitchell Orr	Fr
WR	87	Chance Johnson	Fr
TE	88	Decoryan Holman	Jr
TE	97	Nick Thompson	Fr

Defense

Pos.	#	Name	Class
DB	2	Tony Newman	So
LB	5	Jalen Porter	Jr
DB	8	Steffon Herd	Sr
LB	10	La'More Wise	Jr
DL	11	Dakota Moran	Sr
DB	12	Jaylen Hall	Jr
DB	19	Ashton Antwine	Jr
DB	22	Kevin Bell	So
DB	23	Traviontae Martin	Sr
DB	24	Devon Siers	So
LB	25	Colby Bivins	So
DB	26	La'Vonte White	Fr
DB	28	Paul Lewis	Jr
DB	29	Jacob Woodson	Fr
LB	31	Darion Morris	Sr
LB	32	Coleby Evans	Fr
DB	33	Jack Alspaugh	Fr
DB	34	Isaiah Silversmith	So
DB	36	Tyler Skeen	Fr
DB	37	Tim Howard	Fr
LB	38	Tre'Von Overstreet	Fr
LB	39	Aaron Livingston	Fr
LB	40	Kenneth Davis	Sr
LB	43	Nathan Herring	Fr
DL	44	Riley Smith	Fr
DL	45	T'Nheous Smith	So
LB	48	Andrew Clark	Fr
DB	49	Johnny Scott	Fr
LB	52	Lane Yoder	Fr
LB	54	Zaccheus Johnson	So
DL	57	JaCory Miller	Fr
LB	58	Cole Dixon	Fr
LB	59	Noah Ashley	Fr
DL	70	Jacob Taylor-Goss	Fr
DL	73	George Brooks	Fr
DL	89	Dalton Pierce	So
DL	90	Gil Niko	Sr
DL	91	Rogerick Kirby	So
DL	92	Hunter Collins	Fr
DL	93	Justin Marshall	Sr
DL	94	Xavier Mason	Fr
DL	95	Quincy Dotson	So
DL	96	Christian Riley	So
LB	98	Uchechukwu Essang	Fr
DL	99	Reuben Washington	Sr

Special teams

Pos.	#	Name	Class
K	41	Justin Dunn	Fr
P	42	Forrest Ascarrunz	Jr
K	46	Toshi Hayashi	Jr
K	47	Eddie Garcia	Sr

Head coach

- Rob Robinson

Coordinators/assistant coaches

- See coaching staff

Legend

- (C) Team captain
- (S) Suspended
- (I) Ineligible
- Injured
- Redshirt

Roster
Last update: 2016-08-30
