= Jerry Partridge =

American football player and coach (born 1963)

Current position
- Title: Head coach
- Team: Northwestern Oklahoma State
- Conference: GAC
- Record: 0–0

Biographical details
- Born: January 22, 1963 (age 63); Grandview, Missouri, U.S.

Playing career
- 1981–1986: Missouri Western

Coaching career (HC unless noted)
- 1986–1987: Missouri (GA)
- 1988–1989: Notre Dame (GA)
- 1990: Austin Peay (DC)
- 1991–1995: Missouri Western (DC)
- 1996: Murray State (DB)
- 1997–2016: Missouri Western
- 2017–2018: Delta State (DC)
- 2019–2022: Northern Arizona (DC)
- 2023–2024: UT Martin (AHC/S)
- 2025: UT Martin (AHC/DC)
- 2026–present: Northwestern Oklahoma State

Head coaching record
- Overall: 149–83
- Bowls: 4–2
- Tournaments: 2–4 (NCAA D-II playoffs)

Accomplishments and honors

Championships
- 2 MIAA (2003, 2012)

Awards
- 2 MIAA Coach of the Year

Jerry Partridge (born January 22, 1963) is an American college football coach and former player. He is the assistant head football coach and Defensive coordinator for the University of Tennessee at Martin, a position he has held since 2025. He was the head football coach at Missouri Western State University in St. Joseph, Missouri, a position he had held from 1997 to 2016. Before becoming head coach at Missouri Western in 1997, Partridge assisted various teams from 1986 to 1996. Partridge was a graduate assistant for the 1988 Notre Dame Fighting Irish football team, who won the national championship.

== Personal life ==
Partridge and his wife, Pam, have two children, Travis and Lindsey. Partridge is the son of Linda and Gerald Partridge, who coached at Ruskin High School for 29 years.

== Head coaching record ==
Year	Team	Overall	Conference	Standing	Bowl/playoffs	AFCA^{#}
Missouri Western Griffons (Mid-America Intercollegiate Athletics Association) (1997–2016)
1997	Missouri Western	5–6	3–6	7th		
1998	Missouri Western	5–6	3–6	T–6th		
1999	Missouri Western	7–4	6–3	3rd		
2000	Missouri Western	8–4	8–1	2nd	L Mineral Water	
2001	Missouri Western	8–3	6–3	T–3rd		
2002	Missouri Western	6–5	4–5	T–5th		
2003	Missouri Western	9–3	7–2	T–1st	W Mineral Water	
2004	Missouri Western	5–6	4–3	T–5th		
2005	Missouri Western	9–3	7–2	T–2nd	W Mineral Water	
2006	Missouri Western	9–3	7–2	T–2nd	L NCAA Division II First Round	
2007	Missouri Western	9–3	6–3	T–3rd	W Mineral Water	
2008	Missouri Western	6–6	5–4	T–4th	L Mineral Water	
2009	Missouri Western	9–3	6–3	T–2nd	W Mineral Water	
2010	Missouri Western	8–4	6–3	T–3rd	L NCAA Division II First Round	24
2011	Missouri Western	9–3	7–2	T–2nd	L NCAA Division II First Round	18
2012	Missouri Western	12–2	9–1	1st	L NCAA Division II Quarterfinal	5
2013	Missouri Western	8–3	7–3	4th		
2014	Missouri Western	7–4	7–4	T–4th		
2015	Missouri Western	6–5	6–5	T–5th		
2016	Missouri Western	4–7	4–7	7th		
Missouri Western:		149–83	117–68			
Northwestern Oklahoma State Rangers (Great American Conference) (2026–present)
2026	Northwestern Oklahoma State	0–0	0–0			
Northwestern Oklahoma State:		0–0	0–0			
Total:		149–83				
^{#}Rankings from AFCA.
