= Rob Robinson (American football) =

American football player and coach (born 1977)

Biographical details
- Born: September 25, 1977 (age 48); Trenton, Missouri, U.S.

Playing career
- 1997–2001: William Jewell
- Position: Fullback

Coaching career (HC unless noted)
- 2001–02: Pittsburg State (GA)
- 2002–10: Washburn (assistant)
- 2010–13: Washburn (OC)
- 2014–2018: Northeastern State

Head coaching record
- Overall: 6–47

Rob Robinson (born September 25, 1977) is an American football coach and former player. He is formerly the head football coach at Northeastern State University in Tahlequah, Oklahoma. Robinson was announced as the new head coach on December 19, 2013, replacing Kenny Evans . Before becoming head coach at Northeastern State, Robinson was an assistant coach and offensive coordinator at Washburn. It was announced in October 2018, that his contract would not be renewed. Robinson resigned on October 31, 2018, with only two season games left.

== Playing career ==
Robinson was a four-year letterman and three-year starter playing as a fullback at William Jewell College. In both 1997 and 1998, Robinson was the Special Teams Player of the Year, was an all-conference selection his junior year, and was named to the Player's Leadership Committee and All-Heart of America Athletic Conference Third Team as a senior.

== Personal life ==
Robinson and his wife, Jes, have two sons beckett and tabor and one daughter grier.

== Head coaching record ==
Year	Team	Overall	Conference	Standing	Bowl/playoffs
Northeastern State (Mid-America Intercollegiate Athletics Association) (2014–2018)
2014	Northeastern State	0–11	0–11	12th	
2015	Northeastern State	3–8	3–8	T–9th	
2016	Northeastern State	2–9	2–9	T–10th	
2017	Northeastern State	1–10	1–10	11th	
2018	Northeastern State	0–9	0–9		
Northeastern State:		6–47	6–47		
Total:		6–47			
