= Spratt Stadium =

Stadium in St. Joseph, Missouri

Coordinates: 39.762022°N 94.785978°W

Spratt Memorial Stadium
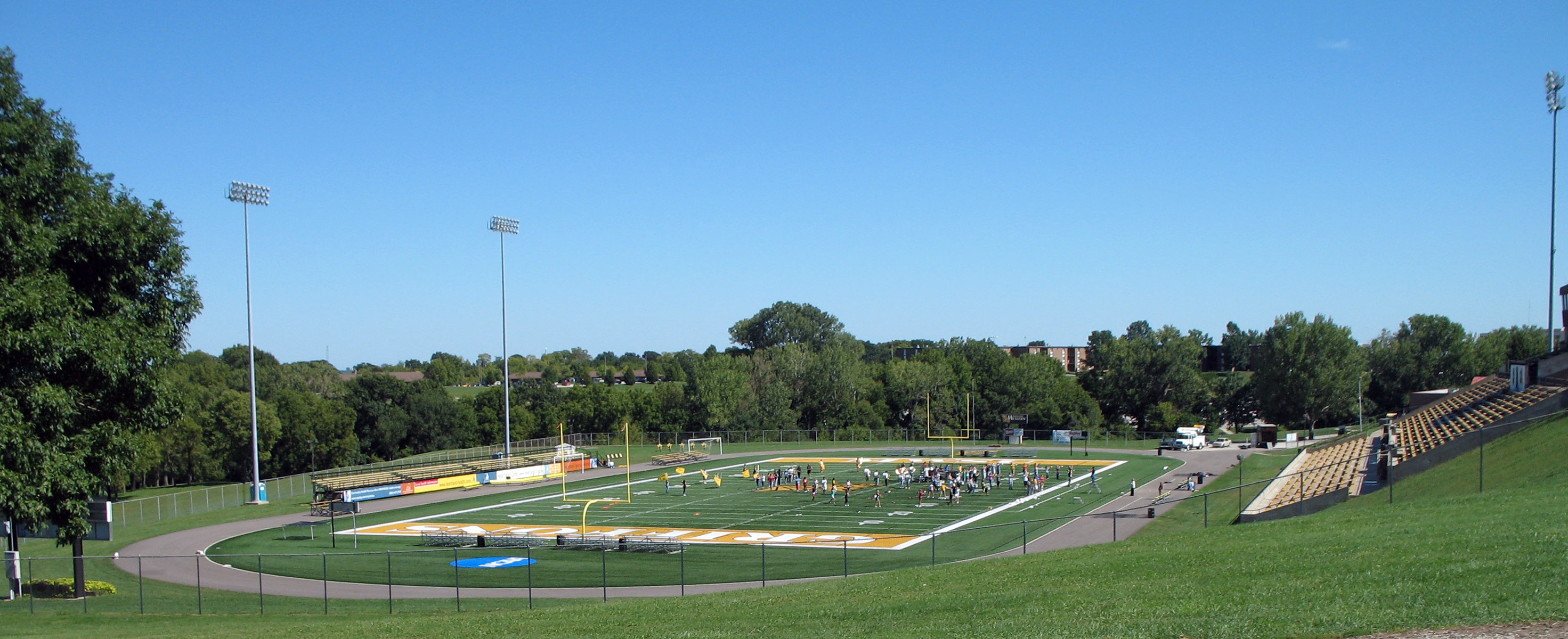
- Interactive map of Spratt Memorial Stadium
- Location: St. Joseph, Missouri
- Owner: Missouri Western State University
- Operator: Missouri Western State University
- Capacity: 10,000
- Surface: Artificial

Construction
- Opened: 1979

Tenant
- Missouri Western Griffons football (NCAA) (1979–present)

Spratt Memorial Stadium, also known as Craig Field at Spratt Stadium, is a 7,500-seat stadium in St. Joseph, Missouri, United States, on the campus of Missouri Western State University. In 2010, it became the summer training camp for the Kansas City Chiefs. Additionally, it currently hosts all Missouri State High School Activities Association state championship games.

== History ==
Spratt opened in 1979. Previously Missouri Western played at municipal owned Noyes Field by Central High School. It is named for Elliot Spratt, an executive with Hillyard, Inc. whose family has donated money for numerous buildings on the campus.

Missouri Western opened stadium with a 44-0 victory over Dana College.

Initial cost was $850,000. Lights were added in 1985.

In 2006 its grass turf was replaced by artificial turf manufactured by Pittsburgh, Pennsylvania-based ProGrass Synthetic Turf Systems

The stadium initially could seat 6,000 but was expanded in 2009 to accommodate 7,500. There is grass seating on an adjoining hill. The biggest crowds are for the Northwest Missouri-Missouri Western football rivalry including 10,129 in 2009 and 9,207 in 2007

From 1998 to 2007 the stadium hosted the Missouri 8-Man High School Football Championship, taking over from longtime host Bearcat Stadium. The games were then moved to the Edward Jones Dome in St. Louis with the 11-man championships, then to Faurot Field at the University of Missouri after the St. Louis Rams returned to Los Angeles.

All seven MSHSAA championship games moved to Spratt in 2025 and will be played there through at least 2029.

In 2018 the Bill Snyder Pavilion was dedicated at the west end of the playing field, in honor of the St. Joseph native and former Kansas State football coach.

== Kansas City Chiefs Training Center ==
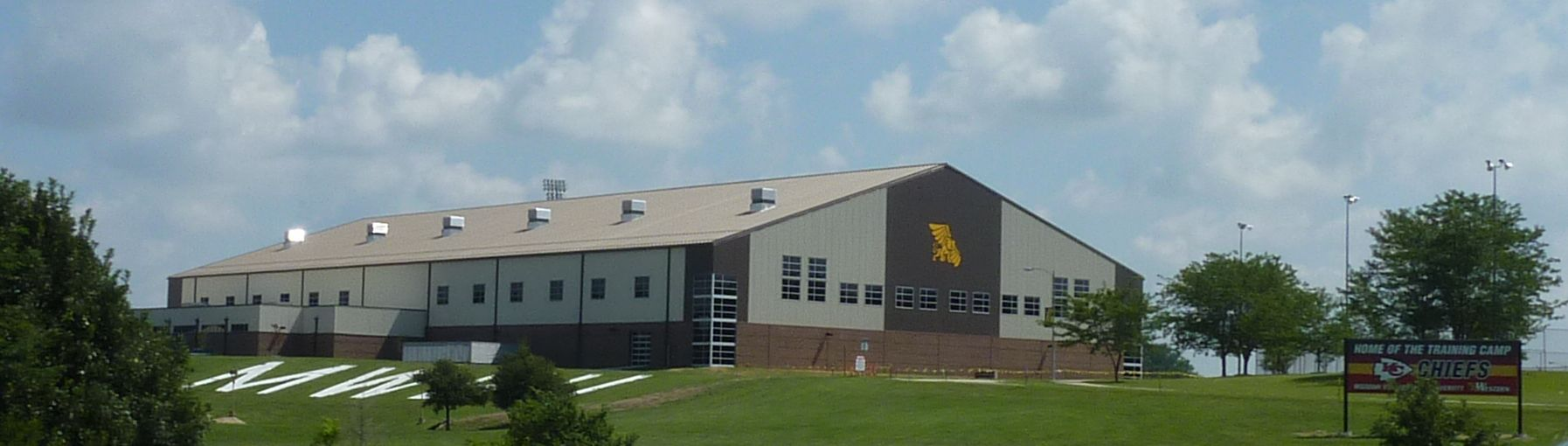
Chiefs training camp building adjacent to the school's "MWSU" hillside letters

In 2009 Missouri Western signed a contract for the Kansas City Chiefs to move to the stadium from River Falls, Wisconsin, in 2010. A $10.5 million 118,000-square-foot (11,000 m^{2}) facility was built just west of the stadium between it and I-29 on a former softball field. It includes a full-size indoor football field, a locker room, weight room, training room, coaches’ offices, meeting rooms and a lecture hall. It is designed by St. Joseph architect Jeff Ellison of Ellison-Auxier Architects. The Chiefs occupy it three weeks each year and the Griffons access it the rest of the year.
