= Ron & Carol Cope Stadium =

Football stadium in Kearney, Nebraska

Ron & Carol Cope Stadium at Foster Field
- Cope Stadium
- Interactive map of Ron & Carol Cope Stadium at Foster Field
- Former names: Foster Field
- Address: 2708 12th Ave. Kearney, Nebraska, U.S.
- Coordinates: 40.6994°N 99.098°W
- Owner: University of Nebraska at Kearney
- Operator: University of Nebraska at Kearney
- Capacity: 5,250
- Type: Football stadium
- Surface: FieldTurf

Construction
- Opened: 1939
- Renovated: 2004

Tenants
- Nebraska–Kearney Lopers (football & soccer)

Ron & Carol Cope Stadium at Foster Field is a football stadium located in Kearney, Nebraska, U.S., on the University of Nebraska at Kearney campus. In 2005, the university named the stadium after Ron and Carol Cope, who were long-time supporters of the University of Nebraska system. The field is named after Charlie Foster, a former coach and athletic director at Nebraska–Kearney.

== Renovations ==
The stadium had an outdoor track surrounding Foster Field until the early 2000s. After the 2003 season, a FieldTurf surface was installed. The first game played on the new field was on September 3. The Nebraska–Kearney Lopers football team beat the Wayne State Warriors in front of 3,804 fans.

The complete renovation of the stadium totaled out to be over $7.2 million, which was completed during the 2005 season. The stadium is three stories tall, and includes concession stands, restrooms, and ticket booths. The third floor has a large hospitality room that seats, coaches and radio booths, game-day operations rooms and the press box.

An LED message center and scoreboard was added at the South end zone, as well. The North end zone is a facility that contains the locker rooms, meeting rooms, athletic training facilities, officials' quarters, and equipment storage.

== Other uses ==
The women's soccer team has played at Cope Stadium since 2009. The program's first regular season game drew 3,227 fans, setting a Division II record that still stands.

Kearney High School also uses the stadium for their home football games. The Nebraska School Activities Association's yearly state championship game for high school six-man football is also held at Cope Stadium, as is the championship for one division of eight-man football; two divisions of eight-man and all standard 11-man championship games are held at the University of Nebraska–Lincoln's Memorial Stadium.
