= 2018 Emporia State Hornets football team =

American college football season

2018 Emporia State Hornets football

Corsicana Bowl, W 30–22 vs. Arkansas–Monticello
- Conference: Mid-America Intercollegiate Athletics Association
- Record: 8–4 (7–4 MIAA)
- Head coach: Garin Higgins (12th season)
- Co-defensive coordinators: Mike LoPorto (9th season); Bryan Nardo (7th season)
- Home stadium: Francis G. Welch Stadium

2018 Mid-America Intercollegiate Athletics Association football standings
| | Conf. | | | Overall |
| Team | W | | L | W | | L |
|---|---|---|---|---|---|---|
| No. 10 NW Missouri State +^ | 9 | – | 2 | 10 | – | 3 |
| No. 22 Fort Hays State +^ | 9 | – | 2 | 9 | – | 3 |
| Pittsburg State | 8 | – | 3 | 8 | – | 3 |
| Central Oklahoma # | 7 | – | 4 | 8 | – | 4 |
| Emporia State # | 7 | – | 4 | 8 | – | 4 |
| Missouri Western # | 6 | – | 5 | 7 | – | 5 |
| Central Missouri | 5 | – | 6 | 5 | – | 6 |
| Nebraska–Kearney | 5 | – | 6 | 5 | – | 6 |
| Washburn | 5 | – | 6 | 5 | – | 6 |
| Lindenwood | 4 | – | 7 | 4 | – | 7 |
| Missouri Southern | 1 | – | 10 | 1 | – | 10 |
| Northeastern State | 0 | – | 11 | 0 | – | 11 |
$ – Conference champion; ^ – NCAA Division II playoff participant; # – bowl participant (Emporia State: Heritage Bowl, Missouri Western: Live United Texarkana Bowl, Central Oklahoma: C.H.A.M.P.S. Heart of Texas Bowl); Rankings from AFCA Poll

The 2018 Emporia State Hornets football team represented Emporia State University in the 2018 NCAA Division II football season. The Hornets played their home games on Jones Field at Francis G. Welch Stadium in Emporia, Kansas, as they have done since 1937. 2018 was the 121st season in school history. The Hornets are led by head coach Garin Higgins, who is in his 17th season overall, and 12th season at Emporia State as head coach. Emporia State has been a member of the Mid-America Intercollegiate Athletics Association (MIAA) since 1991.

== Schedule ==
| Date | Time | Opponent | Site | Result | Attendance |
|---|---|---|---|---|---|
| August 30 | 7:00 p.m. | at Northeastern State | Doc Wadley Stadium; Tahlequah, OK | W 34–7 | 2,109 |
| September 6 | 7:00 p.m. | Pittsburg State | Francis G. Welch Stadium; Emporia, KS | L 34–13 | 5,764 |
| September 15 | 2:00 p.m. | at Nebraska–Kearney | Ron & Carol Cope Stadium; Kearney, NE | W 20–17 | 6,217 |
| September 22 | 2:00 p.m. | Lindenwood | Francis G. Welch Stadium; Emporia, KS | L 48–41 | 4,987 |
| September 29 | 1:30 p.m. | at No. 17 Northwest Missouri State | Bearcat Stadium; Maryville, MO | L 41–0 | 6,141 |
| October 6 | 2:00 p.m. | No. 18 Fort Hays State | Francis G. Welch Stadium; Emporia, KS | W 28–24 | 3,087 |
| October 13 | 1:00 p.m. | at Central Missouri | Audrey J. Walton Stadium; Warrensburg, MO | W 41–23 | 5,835 |
| October 20 | 2:00 p.m. | Missouri Western^{†} | Francis G. Welch Stadium; Emporia, KS | L 42–28 | 4,714 |
| October 27 | 2:00 p.m. | at Washburn | Yager Stadium at Moore Bowl; Topeka, KS (rivalry) | W 34–31 ^{OT} | 6,340 |
| November 3 | 2:00 p.m. | Missouri Southern | Francis G. Welch Stadium; Emporia, KS | W 48–0 | 3,056 |
| November 10 | 2:00 p.m. | Central Oklahoma | Wantland Stadium; Edmond, OK | W 35–28 | 5,118 |
| December 1 | 2:00 p.m. | Arkansas–Monticello* | Corsicana Stadium; Corsicana, TX | W 30–22 | 4,000 |
*Non-conference game; ^{†}Homecoming; Rankings from AFCA Poll released prior to the game; All times are in Central time

== Preseason ==
The Hornets entered the 2018 season after finishing with a 6–5 overall and in conference play the previous season under Higgins. On July 31, 2018 at the MIAA Football Media Day, the Hornets were chosen to finish fifth in both the coaches and media polls.

== Game summaries ==
=== Northeastern State ===
Emporia State at Northeastern State

| Team | 1 | 2 | 3 | 4 | Total |
|---|---|---|---|---|---|
| • Emporia State | 13 | 0 | 21 | 0 | 34 |
| Northeastern State | 0 | 7 | 0 | 0 | 7 |

- Date: August 30
- Location: Wadley Stadium, Tahlequah, OK
- Game start: 7:00 pm CDT
- Elapsed time: 2:54
- Game attendance: 2,109
- Game weather: Sunny and cool, 72°F
- Referee: James Brookhart

=== Pittsburg State ===
Pittsburg State at Emporia State

| Team | 1 | 2 | 3 | 4 | Total |
|---|---|---|---|---|---|
| • Pittsburg State | 3 | 7 | 3 | 21 | 34 |
| Emporia State | 7 | 6 | 0 | 0 | 13 |

- Date: September 6
- Location: Welch Stadium, Emporia, KS
- Game start: 7:00 pm CDT
- Elapsed time: 2:52
- Game attendance: 5,764
- Game weather: Overcast, 72°F
- Referee: Scott Hardin

=== Nebraska–Kearney ===
Emporia State at Nebraska–Kearney

| Team | 1 | 2 | 3 | 4 | Total |
|---|---|---|---|---|---|
| • Emporia State | 0 | 0 | 14 | 6 | 20 |
| Nebraska–Kearney | 14 | 3 | 0 | 0 | 17 |

- Date: September 15
- Location: Cope Stadium, Kearney, NE
- Game start: 2:00 pm CDT
- Elapsed time: 3:01
- Game attendance: 6,217
- Game weather: Hot and humid, 89°F
- Referee: John Adams

=== Lindenwood ===
at Lindenwood at Emporia State

| Team | 1 | 2 | 3 | 4 | Total |
|---|---|---|---|---|---|
| • Lindenwood | 0 | 21 | 20 | 7 | 48 |
| Emporia | 13 | 7 | 7 | 14 | 41 |

- Date: September 22
- Location: Welch Stadium, Emporia, KS
- Game start: 2:00 pm CDT
- Elapsed time: 3:10
- Game attendance: 4,987
- Game weather: Sunny, 72°F
- Referee: Lonnie Brickman

=== Northwest Missouri State ===
Emporia State at Northwest Missouri State

| Team | 1 | 2 | 3 | 4 | Total |
|---|---|---|---|---|---|
| Emporia State | 0 | 0 | 0 | 0 | 0 |
| • #17 Northwest Missouri State | 7 | 20 | 7 | 7 | 41 |

- Date: September 29
- Location: Bearcat Stadium, Maryville, MO
- Game start: 1:30 pm CDT
- Elapsed time: 2:28
- Game attendance: 6,141
- Game weather: Rain, 50°F
- Referee: John Adams

=== Fort Hays State ===
Fort Hays State at Emporia State

| Team | 1 | 2 | 3 | 4 | Total |
|---|---|---|---|---|---|
| #18 Fort Hays State | 7 | 0 | 10 | 7 | 24 |
| • Emporia State | 0 | 0 | 7 | 21 | 28 |

- Date: October 6
- Location: Welch Stadium, Emporia, KS
- Game start: 2:00 pm CDT
- Elapsed time: 3:03
- Game attendance: 3,087
- Game weather: Overcast, 52°F
- Referee: Dwight Neibling

=== Central Missouri ===
Emporia State at Central Missouri

| Team | 1 | 2 | 3 | 4 | Total |
|---|---|---|---|---|---|
| • Emporia State | 7 | 20 | 0 | 14 | 41 |
| Central Missouri | 3 | 14 | 0 | 6 | 23 |

- Date: October 13
- Location: Walton Stadium, Warrensburg, MO
- Game start: 1:00 pm CDT
- Elapsed time: 3:01
- Game attendance: 5,835
- Game weather: Cloudy, 48°F
- Referee: Lonnie Brickman

=== Missouri Western ===
Missouri Western at Emporia State

| Team | 1 | 2 | 3 | 4 | Total |
|---|---|---|---|---|---|
| • Missouri Western | 7 | 13 | 0 | 22 | 42 |
| Emporia State | 7 | 7 | 14 | 0 | 28 |

- Date: October 20
- Location: Welch Stadium, Emporia, KS
- Game start: 2:00 pm CDT
- Elapsed time: 3:06
- Game attendance: 4,714
- Game weather: Sunny, 64°F
- Referee: Criag Helser

=== Washburn ===
Emporia State at Washburn

| Team | 1 | 2 | 3 | 4 | OT | Total |
|---|---|---|---|---|---|---|
| • Emporia State | 7 | 14 | 7 | 0 | 6 | 34 |
| Washburn | 0 | 21 | 0 | 7 | 3 | 31 |

- Date: October 27
- Location: Yager Stadium, Topeka, KS
- Game start: 1:00 pm CDT
- Elapsed time: 3:22
- Game attendance: 6,340
- Game weather: Beautiful, 57°F
- Referee: Dwight Neibling

=== Missouri Southern ===
Missouri Southern at Emporia State

| Team | 1 | 2 | 3 | 4 | Total |
|---|---|---|---|---|---|
| Missouri Southern | 0 | 0 | 0 | 0 | 0 |
| • Emporia State | 0 | 20 | 14 | 14 | 48 |

- Date: November 3
- Location: Welch Stadium, Emporia, KS
- Game start: 2:00 pm CST
- Elapsed time: 2:54
- Game attendance: 3,056
- Game weather: Cloudy, 55°F
- Referee: Scott Hardin

=== Central Oklahoma ===
Emporia State at Central Oklahoma

| Team | 1 | 2 | 3 | 4 | Total |
|---|---|---|---|---|---|
| • Emporia State | 7 | 7 | 7 | 14 | 35 |
| Central Oklahoma | 0 | 14 | 7 | 7 | 28 |

- Date: November 10
- Location: Wantland Stadium, Edmond, OK
- Game start: 2:00 pm CDT
- Elapsed time: 3:08
- Game attendance: 5,118
- Game weather: Sunny, 40°F
- Referee: Craig Helser

=== Corsicana Bowl: Arkansas–Monticello ===
Emporia State vs. Arkansas–Monticello

| Team | 1 | 2 | 3 | 4 | Total |
|---|---|---|---|---|---|
| Arkansas–Monticello | 6 | 3 | 10 | 3 | 22 |
| • Emporia State | 6 | 12 | 6 | 6 | 30 |

- Date: December 1
- Location: Tiger Stadium, Corsicana, TX
- Game start: 2:00 pm CDT
- Elapsed time: 3:19
- Game attendance: 4,000
- Game weather: Sunny, 71°F
- Referee: Scott Hardin

== Personnel ==
=== Coaching staff ===
Along with Higgins, there are 9 assistants.

| Name | Position | Seasons at ESU | Alma mater |
|---|---|---|---|
| Garin Higgins | Head coach | 12 | Emporia State (1992) |
| Mike LoPorto | Co-defensive coordinator/defensive line coach | 9 | Emporia State (2010) |
| Bryan Nardo | Co-defensive coordinator/linebackers Coach | 7 | Ohio (2008) |
| Cayden Cochran | Passing Game/recruiting coordinator/running backs | 1 | Valdosta State (2013) |
| Nathan Linsey | Defensive Secondary/special teams coordinator | 8 | Emporia State (2010) |
| Tony Koehling | Running game coordinator/offensive line coach | 4 | Ohio (2013) |
| Austin Willis | Running backs/strength and conditioning coach | 2 | Emporia State (2015) |
| Jarrett Stastny | Graduate Assistant/offensive line | 1 | Emporia State (2017) |
| Brock Burrows | Graduate Assistant/linebackers | 1 | Emporia State (2018) |
| Darius Hicks | Graduate Assistant/defensive backs | 1 | Lincoln (MO) (2017) |

=== Roster ===
2018 Emporia State Hornets football team roster
Players
Coaches
Offense

| Pos. | # | Name | Class |
|---|---|---|---|
| QB | 2 | Dalton Cowan | Fr |
| WR | 4 | Jordan Reed | Sr |
| WR | 5 | Justin Brown | Sr |
| WR | 6 | Kyle Harrison | Jr |
| RB | 9 | Kai Callins | Jr |
| WR | 10 | Jaylon Radel | Sr |
| WR | 11 | Jordan Jackson | Sr |
| QB | 12 | T'Quan Wallace | Jr |
| QB | 14 | Braxton Marstall | Sr |
| QB | 15 | Pat Briningstool | Fr |
| QB | 16 | Ethan Anderson | So |
| RB | 19 | Dillon Lohr | Jr |
| RB | 22 | Wil Ammos | Fr |
| SB | 24 | Denzel Strong | Sr |
| RB | 25 | Ricky VanWeezel | Jr |
| RB | 26 | Landon Nault | Sr |
| RB | 35 | Calvin Boyce | Fr |
| RB | 37 | Clay Phillips | Fr |
| SB | 39 | Andre Lewis | Jr |
| SB | 44 | Sam Neumeier | Jr |
| SB | 48 | Cole Schumacker | Fr |
| SB | 49 | Case Cochran | Fr |
| OL | 53 | Jarrett Roy | Jr |
| OL | 61 | Marlon McKeithen | Jr |
| OL | 62 | Daegan Manley | Fr |
| OL | 64 | Hayden Reed | Fr |
| OL | 65 | Denton Sanchez | Fr |
| OL | 66 | Wyatt Malcom | Fr |
| OL | 67 | Aaron Clark | Fr |
| OL | 69 | Zack Fasbender | Fr |
| OL | 70 | Andrew Lillich | Sr |
| OL | 71 | Brandon Kane | Fr |
| OL | 72 | Xavier Cason | Fr |
| OL | 75 | Estevan Arana | Jr |
| OL | 76 | Austin Unterreiner | Jr |
| OL | 77 | Braden Janzen | Sr |
| OL | 78 | Stephen Williams | Jr |
| SB | 79 | Tyler Banta | Jr |
| WR | 80 | Trenton Ball | Sr |
| SB | 81 | Kirvin Parks | Jr |
| WR | 82 | Tyler Harris | So |
| WR | 83 | Corey Thomas | Fr |
| WR | 84 | Kai Lemons | Jr |
| WR | 85 | Seth Surface | Jr |
| WR | 86 | Sean Talley | Jr |
| WR | 87 | Jack Schneider | Fr |
| WR | 88 | Travon Jones | Jr |
| WR | 89 | Zach Cahill | So |

Defense

| Pos. | # | Name | Class |
|---|---|---|---|
| LB | 1 | Lawson Holbert | Sr |
| DB | 3 | Roscoe Gatewood | Jr |
| DB | 7 | Jordan Wallace | So |
| LB | 8 | Gary Woods II | Jr |
| DB | 13 | Brent Davenport | Sr |
| LB | 17 | Orlando Sheets | Sr |
| DB | 18 | Trey Morris | So |
| DB | 20 | Jawill Aldridge | Jr |
| DB | 21 | Marquise Johnson | Sr |
| DB | 23 | Asher Goldston | Sr |
| DB | 27 | Blake Wilson | So |
| DB | 28 | Jaedon Pool | Fr |
| DB | 29 | Cole Baird | Fr |
| DB | 30 | Kelin Gordon | So |
| LB | 31 | Jace McDown | So |
| LB | 32 | Doug Collins | Fr |
| LB | 33 | Randall Friday | Fr |
| LB | 34 | Joshua Carrethers | Fr |
| LB | 36 | Logan Thompson | Jr |
| LB | 38 | Cade Harelson | So |
| DB | 41 | Cody Ladson | Fr |
| DB | 42 | Cody Savage | Jr |
| LB | 43 | Dawson Hammes | So |
| DB | 45 | Kyle Rink | Fr |
| DB | 47 | Montrell Wilson | Fr |
| DE | 50 | Donovan Walker | Fr |
| LB | 51 | Darric Cashier | Sr |
| DB | 52 | Jordan Griffin | Jr |
| DE | 54 | Logan Powell | Sr |
| DL | 55 | Brance Watts | Jr |
| LB | 56 | Brett Sage | Fr |
| LB | 58 | Immanuel Cason | Sr |
| LB | 59 | Matt Johnson | So |
| DL | 60 | Cody Swanson | Jr |
| DL | 63 | Carlos Taylor | Jr |
| LB | 68 | Chad Gloudeman | Fr |
| DL | 73 | Camren Proby | Jr |
| DL | 74 | Miles Wade | Fr |
| DE | 90 | Parker Bass | Sr |
| DE | 91 | Marcellus Edwards | Sr |
| DL | 92 | Jahmek Murphy | Fr |
| DL | 93 | Marek Thompson | Jr |
| DE | 94 | Anthony Burton | Fr |
| DE | 95 | Tre'Vaun Ammons | Jr |
| DE | 96 | Hawkens Taylor | Fr |
| DL | 97 | Isaiah Miles | So |
| DE | 98 | Jackson Maase | Jr |
| DL | 99 | Dyllan Haworth | Fr |

Special teams

| Pos. | # | Name | Class |
|---|---|---|---|
| K | 40 | Sam Dobbins | So |
| K | 46 | Clark Schoonover | Fr |
| LS | 57 | Austin Passemore | Jr |

Head coach

- Garin Higgins

Coordinators/assistant coaches

- See Coaching staff

Legend

- (C) Team captain
- (S) Suspended
- (I) Ineligible
- Injured
- Redshirt

Roster
Last update: July 31, 2018
