= 2016 Mid-America Intercollegiate Athletics Association football season =

- League: NCAA Division II
- Sport: Football
- Duration: September 1, 2016 – November 12, 2016
- Teams: 12

2016

Football seasons
- 2015 2017

2016 Mid-America Intercollegiate Athletics Association football standings
	Conf.			Overall
Team	W		L	W		L
No. 1 NW Missouri State $^	11	–	0	15	–	0
No. 10 Emporia State ^	10	–	1	11	–	2
No. 21 Central Missouri ^	9	–	2	9	–	3
Fort Hays State #	7	–	4	8	–	4
Pittsburg State	7	–	4	7	–	4
Washburn #	7	–	4	7	–	5
Missouri Western	4	–	7	4	–	7
Central Oklahoma	3	–	8	3	–	8
Lindenwood	3	–	8	3	–	8
Missouri Southern	2	–	9	2	–	9
Northeastern State	2	–	9	2	–	9
Nebraska–Kearney	1	–	10	1	–	10
$ – Conference champion; ^ – NCAA Division II playoff participant; # – bowl participant (Wahsburn: Mineral Water Bowl, Fort Hays State: C.H.A.M.P.S. Heart of Texas Bowl; Rankings from AFCA poll)

The 2016 Mid-America Intercollegiate Athletics Association football season is made up of 12 United States collegiate athletic programs that compete in the Mid-America Intercollegiate Athletics Association (MIAA) under the NCAA Division II for the 2016 college football season. The season began on Thursday, September 1, 2016. Northwest Missouri State enters the season as the Conference and National Champions.

== Conference teams ==
School	Nickname	Location	Stadium
Central Missouri	Mules	Warrensburg, Missouri	Audrey J. Walton Stadium
Central Oklahoma	Bronchos	Edmond, Oklahoma	Wantland Stadium
Emporia State	Hornets	Emporia, Kansas	Francis G. Welch Stadium
Fort Hays State	Tigers	Hays, Kansas	Lewis Field
Lindenwood	Lions	St. Charles, Missouri	Hunter Stadium
Missouri Southern	Lions	Joplin, Missouri	Fred G. Hughes Stadium
Missouri Western	Griffons	St. Joseph, Missouri	Spratt Stadium
Nebraska–Kearney	Lopers	Kearney, Nebraska	Ron & Carol Cope Stadium
Northeastern State	RiverHawks	Tahlequah, Oklahoma	Doc Wadley Stadium
Northwest Missouri	Bearcats	Maryville, Missouri	Bearcat Stadium
Pittsburg State	Gorillas	Pittsburg, Kansas	Carnie Smith Stadium
Washburn	Ichabods	Topeka, Kansas	Yager Stadium at Moore Bowl

=== Coaches ===
Please note that the information listed is the information before the season started.

Team	Head coach	Years at school	Overall record	Record at school
Central Missouri	Jim Svoboda	7	99–41	47–22
Central Oklahoma	Nick Bobeck	5	61–40	19–25
Emporia State	Garin Higgins	10	104–59	53–50
Fort Hays State	Chris Brown	6	30–26	
Lindenwood	Patrick Ross	13	104–56	90–49
Missouri Southern	Denver Johnson	2	70–76	1–10
Missouri Western	Jerry Partridge	20	145–76	
Nebraska–Kearney	Josh Lamberson	2	0–11	
Northeastern State	Rob Robinson	3	0–11	
NW Missouri State	Adam Dorrel	6	61–8	
Pittsburg State	Tim Beck	7	53–19	
Washburn	Craig Schurig	13	96–64	

== Preseason outlook ==
Sporting News released their Top-25 on May 25, 2016. Two teams from the conference were ranked in the top 25: #1 Northwest Missouri State and #24 Emporia State.vOn June 15, 2016, the Lindy's NCAA Division II Preseason Top 25 was released, where four teams placed in the top 25 from the conference: #1 Northwest Missouri State, #12 Emporia State, #22 Central Missouri, and Pittsburg State and #25.

On August 2, MIAA Media Days was held at Children's Mercy Park in Kansas City. Northwest Missouri was chosen as #1 and Central Missouri was chosen as #2 for both Coaches and Media polls. The schools were ranked as follows:

	MIAA Coaches
1.	NW Missouri (10)
2.	Central Mo. (1)
3.	Pittsburg St. (1)
3.	Emporia St.
5.	Central Ok.
6.	Fort Hays St.
7.	Mo. Western
8.	Washburn
9.	Northeastern St.
10.	Mo. Southern
11.	Nebraska–Kearney
12.	Lindenwood

( ) first place votes

	MIAA Media
1.	NW Missouri (39)
2.	Central Mo.
3.	Pittsburg St.
4.	Emporia St.
5.	Fort Hays St.
6.	Central Ok.
7.	Mo. Western
8.	Washburn
9.	Lindenwood
10.	Northeastern St.
11.	Mo. Southern
12.	Nebraska–Kearney

( ) first place votes

On August 15, the American Football Coaches Association released the Preseason Division II Poll. Northwest Missouri State, the 2015 National Champions, was selected to finish first, Central Missouri was ranked at No. 20, and Emporia State was selected at No. 24. Central Oklahoma, Fort Hays State, and Pittsburg State all received votes.

On August 25, D2football.com released its Top 25 poll, which includes four MIAA schools. NW Missouri State was ranked 1st, Central Missouri 10th, Emporia State 12th, and Pittsburg State 24th.

== Schedule ==
The first week of conference play began on Thursday, September 1, 2016 and ends on Saturday, November 12, 2016. The schedule is subject to change.

=== Week 1 ===
Date	Time	Visiting team	Home team	Site	TV	Result	Attendance	Ref.
September 1, 2016	7:00 pm	No. 1 Northwest Missouri State	No. 24 Emporia State	Welch Stadium • Emporia, KS		NWMSU 41–14	6,821	
September 1, 2016	7:00 pm	Missouri Southern	Fort Hays State	Lewis Field Stadium • Hays, KS		FHSU 22–10	4,134	
September 1, 2016	7:00 pm	Central Oklahoma	Lindenwood	Hunter Stadium • St. Charles, MO		LWU 49–26	3,132	
September 1, 2016	7:00 pm	Nebraska–Kearney	Missouri Western	Spratt Stadium • St. Joseph, MO		MWSU 44–21	6,017	
September 1, 2016	7:00 pm	No. 20 Central Missouri	Pittsburg State	Smith Stadium • Pittsburg, KS		UCM 34–27	9,311	
September 1, 2016	6:00 pm	Northeastern State	Washburn	Yager Stadium • Topeka, KS		WU 38–19	5,775	
^{#}Rankings from AFCA Poll. All times are in Central Time.

=== Week 2 ===
Date	Time	Visiting team	Home team	Site	TV	Result	Attendance	Ref.
September 8, 2016	7:00 pm	Fort Hays State	No. 16 Central Missouri	Walton Stadium • Warrensburg, MO		UCM 34–17	7,279	
September 8, 2016	7:00 pm	Pittsburg State	Central Oklahoma	Wantland Stadium • Edmond, OK		PSU 45–31	6,218	
September 8, 2016	7:00 pm	Emporia State	Nebraska–Kearney	Cope Stadium • Kearney, NE		ESU 34–7	4,663	
September 8, 2016	7:00 pm	Lindenwood	Northeastern State	Wantland Stadium • Tahlequah, OK		NSU 35–31	2,104	
September 8, 2016	7:00 pm	Washburn	No. 1 Northwest Missouri State	Bearcat Stadium • Maryville, MO		NWMSU 41–7	7,501	
September 10, 2016	6:00 pm	Missouri Western	Missouri Southern	Hughes Stadium • Joplin, MO		MSWSU 51–14	4,274	
^{#}Rankings from AFCA Poll. All times are in Central Time.

=== Week 3 ===
Date	Time	Visiting team	Home team	Site	TV	Result	Attendance	Ref.
September 17, 2016	2:00 pm	Missouri Southern	Emporia State	Welch Stadium • Emporia, KS		ESU 49–21	5,304	
September 17, 2016	7:00 pm	Central Oklahoma	Fort Hays State	Lewis Field Stadium • Hays, KS		FHSU 34–20	3,520	
September 17, 2016	6:00 pm	No. 14 Central Missouri	Missouri Western	Spratt Field • St. Joseph, MO		UCM 38–34	6,533	
September 17, 2016	1:30 pm	Nebraska–Kearney	No. 1 Northwest Missouri State	Bearcat Stadium • Maryville, MO		NWMSU 52–14	8,550	
September 17, 2016	1:00 pm	Northeastern State	Pittsburg State	Smith Stadium • Pittsburg, KS		PSU 38–37 ^{OT}	11,495	
September 17, 2016	6:00 pm	Lindenwood	Washburn	Yager Stadium • Topeka, KS		WU 34–29	6,721	
^{#}Rankings from AFCA Poll. All times are in Central Time.

=== Week 4 ===
Date	Time	Visiting team	Home team	Site	TV	Result	Attendance	Ref.
September 24, 2016†	1:00 pm	Emporia State	No. 13 Central Missouri	Walton Stadium • Warrensburg, MO		ESU 37–31 ^{2OT}	7,995	
September 24, 2016	6:00 pm	Missouri Western	Central Oklahoma	Wantland Stadium • Edmond, OK		UCO 31–21	3,120	
September 24, 2016	6:00 pm	Pittsburg State	Lindenwood	Hunter Stadium • St. Charles, MO		PSU 50–19	3,088	
September 24, 2016	6:00 pm	No. 1 Northwest Missouri State	Missouri Southern	Hughes Stadium • Joplin, MO		NWMSU 45–21	5,267	
September 24, 2016	2:00 pm	Washburn	Nebraska–Kearney	Cope Stadium • Kearney, NE		WU 47–44 ^{3OT}	4,028	
September 24, 2016†	1:00 pm	Fort Hays State	Northeastern State	Wadley Stadium • Tahlequah, OK		FHSU 34–7	2,526	
^{#}Rankings from AFCA Poll. All times are in Central Time.

=== Week 5 ===
Date	Time	Visiting team	Home team	Site	TV	Result	Attendance	Ref.
October 1, 2016	2:00 pm	Central Oklahoma	No. 23 Emporia State	Welch Stadium • Emporia, KS		ESU 35–21	4,987	
October 1, 2016	2:00 pm	Lindenwood	Fort Hays State	Lewis Field Stadium • Hays, KS		FHSU 37–6	4,266	
October 1, 2016	1:00 pm	Northeastern State	Missouri Western	Spratt Stadium • St. Joseph, MO		MWSU 45–14	3,682	
October 1, 2016†	2:00 pm	Missouri Southern	Nebraska–Kearney	Cope Stadium • Kearney, NE		MSSU 24–14	2,005	
October 1, 2016†	5:00 pm	No. 22 Central Missouri	No. 1 Northwest Missouri State	Arrowhead Stadium • Kansas City, MO (Fall Classic)		NWMSU 42–17	15,349	
October 1, 2016	1:00 pm	Pittsburg State	Washburn	Yager Stadium • Topeka, KS		PSU 45–27	6,323	
^{#}Rankings from AFCA Poll. All times are in Central Time.

=== Week 6 ===
Date	Time	Visiting team	Home team	Site	TV	Result	Attendance	Ref.
October 8, 2016	1:00 pm	Nebraska–Kearney	Central Missouri	Walton Stadium • Warrensburg, MO		UCM 36–16	6,637	
October 8, 2016	2:00 pm	No. 1 Northwest Missouri State	Central Oklahoma	Wantland Stadium • Edmond, OK		NWMSU 56–10	3,109	
October 8, 2016	1:30 pm	Missouri Western	Lindenwood	Hunter Stadium • St. Charles, MO		MWSU 37–29	2,132	
October 8, 2016	3:00 pm	Washburn	Missouri Southern	Hughes Field • Joplin, MO		WU 45–13	5,674	
October 8, 2016	2:00 pm	No. 18 Emporia State	Northeastern State	Wadley Stadium • Tahlequah, OK		ESU 47–27	1,503	
October 8, 2016	2:00 pm	Fort Hays State	Pittsburg State	Smith Stadium • Pittsburg, KS		FHSU 54–41	10,238	
^{#}Rankings from AFCA Poll. All times are in Central Time.

=== Week 7 ===
Date	Time	Visiting team	Home team	Site	TV	Result	Attendance	Ref.
October 15, 2016	2:00 pm	Lindenwood	No. 12 Emporia State	Welch Stadium • Emporia, KS		ESU 35–28	6,014	
October 15, 2016	6:00 pm	Central Missouri	Missouri Southern	Hughes Stadium • Joplin, MO		UCM 56–7	2,526	
October 15, 2016	2:00 pm	Pittsburg State	Missouri Western	Spratt Stadium • St. Joseph, MO		PSU 55–47	5,515	
October 15, 2016	2:00 pm	Central Oklahoma	Nebraska–Kearney	Cope Stadium • Kearney, NE		UNK 47–32	2,200	
October 15, 2016†	1:30 pm	Northeastern State	No. 1 Northwest Missouri State	Bearcat Stadium • Maryville, MO		NWMSU 74–29	7,296	
October 15, 2016	1:00 pm	Fort Hays State	Washburn	Yager Stadium • Topeka, KS		WU 30–24	5,350	
^{#}Rankings from AFCA Poll. All times are in Central Time.

=== Week 8 ===
Date	Time	Visiting team	Home team	Site	TV	Result	Attendance	Ref.
October 22, 2016	1:30 pm	Washburn	Central Missouri	Walton Stadium • Warrensburg, MO		UCM 29–27	9,138	
October 22, 2016†	2:00 pm	Missouri Southern	Central Oklahoma	Wantland Stadium • Edmond, OK		UCO 63–42	1,985	
October 22, 2016†	2:00 pm	Missouri Western	Fort Hays State	Lewis Field Stadium • Hays, KS		FHSU 35–27	3,250	
October 22, 2016	1:30 pm	No. 1 Northwest Missouri State	Lindenwood	Hunter Stadium • St. Charles, MO		NWMSU 47–12	3,527	
October 22, 2016†	2:00 pm	Nebraska–Kearney	Northeastern State	Wadley Stadium • Tahlequah, OK		NSU 31–21	1,187	
October 22, 2016	2:00 pm	No. 12 Emporia State	Pittsburg State	Smith Stadium • Pittsburg, KS		ESU 41–36	8,763	
^{#}Rankings from AFCA Poll. All times are in Central Time.

=== Week 9 ===
Date	Time	Visiting team	Home team	Site	TV	Result	Attendance	Ref.
October 29, 2016	1:00 pm	Central Oklahoma	Central Missouri	Walton Stadium • Warrensburg, MO		UCM 48–28	3,895	
October 29, 2016	2:00 pm	Fort Hays State	No. 10 Emporia State	Welch Stadium • Emporia, KS		ESU 24–16	6,103	
October 29, 2016	2:00 pm	Northeastern State	Missouri Southern	Hughes Stadium • Joplin, MO		MSSU 45–33	4,236	
October 29, 2016	2:00 pm	Lindenwood	Nebraska–Kearney	Cope Stadium • Kearney, NE		LWU 35–14	2,005	
October 29, 2016†	2:30 pm	Pittsburg State	No. 1 Northwest Missouri State	Bearcat Stadium • Maryville, MO (Rivalry)		NWMSU 69–10	10,283	
October 29, 2016	1:00 pm	Missouri Western	Washburn	Yager Stadium • Topeka, KS		WU 16–13	6,023	
^{#}Rankings from AFCA Poll. All times are in Central Time.

=== Week 10 ===
Date	Time	Visiting team	Home team	Site	TV	Result	Attendance	Ref.
November 5, 2016	3:00 pm	Washburn	Central Oklahoma	Walton Stadium • Emond, OK		WU 31–28	5,334	
November 5, 2016	2:00 pm	No. 1 Northwest Missouri State	Fort Hays State	Lewis Field Stadium • Hays, KS		NWMSU 28–7	3,325	
November 5, 2016	1:30 pm	Missouri Southern	Lindenwood	Hunter Stadium • St. Charles, MO		LWU 42–28	1,563	
November 5, 2016	1:00 pm	No. 9 Emporia State	Missouri Western	Spratt Stadium • St. Joseph, MO		ESU 27–14	4,017	
November 5, 2016	2:00 pm	No. 25 Central Missouri	Northeastern State	Wadley Stadium • Tahlequah, OK		UCM 59–21	3,250	
November 5, 2016	2:00 pm	Nebraska–Kearney	Pittsburg State	Smith Stadium • Pittsburg, KS		PSU 52–21	8,253	
^{#}Rankings from AFCA Poll. All times are in Central Time.

=== Week 11 ===
Date	Time	Visiting team	Home team	Site	TV	Result	Attendance	Ref.
November 12, 2016	1:00 pm	Lindenwood	No. 24 Central Missouri	Walton Stadium • Warrensburg, MO		UCM 35–7	3,673	
November 12, 2016	3:00 pm	Northeastern State	Central Oklahoma	Wantland Stadium • Edmond, OK (President's Cup)		UCO 17–14	4,223	
November 12, 2016	3:30 pm	Pittsburg State	Missouri Southern	Hughes Stadium • Joplin, MO (Miner's Bowl)		PSU 45–31	5,748	
November 12, 2016	2:00 pm	Fort Hays State	Nebraska–Kearney	Cope Stadium • Kearney, NE		FHSU 27–17	2,100	
November 12, 2016	1:30 pm	Missouri Western	No. 1 Northwest Missouri State	Bearcat Stadium • Maryville, MO		NWMSU 44–3	7,542	
November 12, 2016	1:00 pm	No. 9 Emporia State	Washburn	Yager Stadium • Topeka, KS (Turnpike Tussle)		ESU 30–3	6,789	
^{#}Rankings from AFCA Poll. All times are in Central Time.

=== Postseason ===
==== NCAA Division II playoffs ====
Date	Time	Visiting team	Home team	Site	TV	Result	Attendance	Ref.
November 19	1:00 p.m.	No. 13 Minnesota–Duluth	No. 9 Emporia State	Francis G. Welch Stadium • Emporia, KS		W 59–26	5,014	
November 19	1:00 p.m.	No. 20 Central Missouri	No. 5 Harding	First Security Stadium • Searcy, AR		L 31–48	2,107	
November 26	1:00 p.m.	No. 9 Emporia State	No. 1 Northwest Missouri State	Bearcat Stadium • Maryville, MO		NWMSU 44–13	5,119	
December 3	1:00 p.m.	No. 5 Harding	No. 1 Northwest Missouri State	Bearcat Stadium • Maryville, MO		W 35–0	5,473	
December 10	2:30 p.m.	No. 15 Ferris State	No. 1 Northwest Missouri State	Bearcat Stadium • Maryville, MO		W 35–20		
^{#}Rankings from AFCA Poll. All times are in Central Time.

==== Bowls ====
Date	Time	Visiting team	Home team	Site	TV	Result	Attendance	Ref.
December 3	Noon	Bemidji State	Washburn	Tiger Stadium • Excelsior Springs, MO (Mineral Water Bowl)		L 23–36	2,123	
December 3	6:00 p.m.	Eastern New Mexico	Fort Hays State	Bulldawg Stadium • Copperas Cove, TX (Heart of Texas Bowl)	ESPN 3	W 45–12	750	
^{#}Rankings from AFCA Poll. All times are in Central Time.

== Home game attendance ==
Team	Stadium	Capacity	Game 1	Game 2	Game 3	Game 4	Game 5	Game 6	Total	Average	% of Capacity
Central Missouri	Audrey J. Walton Stadium	10,000	7,279	7,995	6,637	9,138	3,895	3,673	38,617	6,436	64.36%
Central Oklahoma	Wantland Stadium	10,000	6,218	3,120	3,109	1,985	5,334	4,223	23,989	3,998	39.98%
Emporia State	Francis G. Welch Stadium	7,000	6,821	5,304	4,987	6,014	6,103	–	29,229	5,846	58.46%
Fort Hays State	Lewis Field Stadium	6,362	4,134	3,520	4,266	3,250	3,325	–	18,495	3,699	36.99%
Lindenwood	Hunter Stadium	7,450	3,132	3,088	2,132	3,527	1,563	–	13,433	2,687	36.07%
Missouri Southern	Fred G. Hughes Stadium	7,000	4,274	5,267	5,674	2,526	4,236	5,748	27,725	4,621	66.01%
Missouri Western	Spratt Stadium	7,200	6,017	6,533	3,682	5,515	4,017	–	25,764	5,153	71.57%
Nebraska–Kearney	Ron & Carol Cope Stadium	5,250	4,663	4,028	2,005	2,200	2,005	2,100	17,001	2,834	53.98%
Northeastern State	Doc Wadley Stadium	8,300	2,104	2,256	1,503	1,187	3,250	–	10,300	2,060	24.81%
NW Missouri State	Bearcat Stadium	6,500	7,501	8,550	7,296	10,283	7,542	–	41,172	8,235	126.69%
Pittsburg State	Carnie Smith Stadium	7,950	9,311	11,495	10,238	8,763	8,253	–	48,060	9,612	120.91%
Washburn	Yager Stadium at Moore Bowl	7,200	5,775	6,721	6,323	5,350	6,023	6,789	36,890	6,148	85.39%
Totals			67,229	67,877	57,852	59,738	55,546	22,533	330,775	55,129	
