= 2017 Emporia State Hornets football team =

American college football season

2017 Emporia State Hornets football
- Conference: Mid-America Intercollegiate Athletics Association
- Record: 6–5 (6–5 MIAA)
- Head coach: Garin Higgins (11th season)
- Offensive coordinator: Matt Nardo (4th season)
- Co-defensive coordinators: Mike LoPorto (10th season); Bryan Nardo (6th season)
- Home stadium: Francis G. Welch Stadium

2017 Mid-America Intercollegiate Athletics Association football standings
	Conf.			Overall
Team	W		L	W		L
No. 8 Fort Hays State $^	11	–	0	11	–	1
No. 16 NW Missouri State ^	9	–	2	9	–	3
Central Missouri #	8	–	3	9	–	3
Central Oklahoma #	7	–	4	8	–	4
Pittsburg State #	7	–	4	8	–	4
Washburn #	6	–	5	7	–	5
Emporia State	6	–	5	6	–	5
Lindenwood	4	–	7	4	–	7
Missouri Western	4	–	7	4	–	7
Nebraska–Kearney	3	–	8	3	–	8
Northeastern State	1	–	10	1	–	10
Missouri Southern	0	–	11	0	–	11
$ – Conference champion; ^ – NCAA Division II playoff participant; # – bowl participant (Central Missouri: Mineral Water Bowl, Central Oklahoma: Heritage Bowl, Pittsburg State: Live United Texarkana Bowl, Washburn: C.H.A.M.P.S. Heart of Texas Bowl); Rankings from AFCA Poll

The 2017 Emporia State Hornets football team represented Emporia State University in the 2017 NCAA Division II football season. The Hornets played their home games on Jones Field at Francis G. Welch Stadium in Emporia, Kansas, as they have done since 1937. 2017 was the 120th season in school history. The Hornets were led by head coach Garin Higgins, who finished his 16th season overall, and 10th season at Emporia State. Emporia State has been a member of the Mid-America Intercollegiate Athletics Association (MIAA) since 1991.

== Schedule ==
Date	Time	Opponent	Rank	Site	Result	Attendance
August 31	7:00 p.m.	at No. 1 Northwest Missouri State	No. 4	Bearcat Stadium; Maryville, MO	L 34–0	8,055
September 7	7:00 p.m.	Nebraska–Kearney	No. 15	Francis G. Welch Stadium; Emporia, KS	W 45–13	5,013
September 16	6:00 p.m.	at Missouri Southern	No. 14	Fred G. Hughes Stadium; Joplin, MO	W 36–29	4,608
September 23	2:00 p.m.	Central Missouri	No. 15	Francis G. Welch Stadium; Emporia, KS	L 31–37	5,023
September 30	2:00 p.m.	at Central Oklahoma		Wantland Stadium; Edmond, OK	L 52–53	3,845
October 7	2:00 p.m.	Northeastern State		Francis G. Welch Stadium; Emporia, KS	W 44–7	4,702
October 14	1:00 p.m.	at Lindenwood		Harlen C. Hunter Stadium; St. Charles, MO	W 41–30	2,751
October 21–22	2:00 p.m.	Pittsburg State		Francis G. Welch Stadium; Emporia, KS	L 10–27	4,663
October 28	2:00 p.m.	at No. 7 Fort Hays State		Lewis Field Stadium; Hays, KS	L 34–7	4,519
November 4	2:00 p.m.	Missouri Western^{†}		Francis G. Welch Stadium; Emporia, KS	W 30–27	3,805
November 11	2:00 p.m.	Washburn		Francis G. Welch Stadium; Emporia, KS (rivalry)	W 26–20	4,095
^{†}Homecoming; Rankings from AFCA Poll released prior to the game; All times are in Central time

== Preseason ==
The Hornets entered the 2017 season after finishing with an 11–2 overall, 10–1 in conference play the previous season under Higgins. On August 1, 2017 at the MIAA Football Media Day, the Hornets were chosen to finish second in both the coaches and media polls.

On June 1, 2017, the Hornets were ranked No. 4 in Street & Smith's National Preseason Ranking Poll, and landed in the same spot by Lindy's Sports on June 23, 2017.

On August 14, the American Football Coaches Association released its poll, with the Hornets ranked No. 4 in the nation, the highest in school history.

=== Northwest Missouri State ===
Emporia State at Northwest Missouri State

Team	1	2	3	4	Total
#4 Emporia State	0	0	0	0	0
• #1 Northwest Missouri State	3	10	14	7	34

- Date: August 31
- Location: Bearcat Stadium, Maryville, MO
- Game start: 7:00 pm CDT
- Elapsed time: 2:02
- Game attendance: 8,055
- Game weather: Clear, 70°F
- Referee: Dwight Neibling

=== Nebraska–Kearney ===
Nebraska–Kearney at Emporia State

Team	1	2	3	4	Total
Nebraska–Kearney	7	0	6	0	13
• #15 Emporia State	21	10	7	7	45

- Date: September 7
- Location: Welch Stadium, Emporia, KS
- Game start: 7:00 pm CDT
- Elapsed time: 2:39
- Game attendance: 5,013
- Game weather: Clear, 68°F
- Referee: Scott Hardin

=== Missouri Southern ===
Emporia State at Missouri Southern

Team	1	2	3	4	Total
• #14 Emporia State	9	10	7	10	36
Missouri Southern	6	13	3	7	29

- Date: September 16
- Location: Hughes Stadium, Joplin, MO
- Game start: 6:00 pm CDT
- Elapsed time: 3:39
- Game attendance: 4,608
- Game weather: Mostly cloudy, 89°F
- Referee: Craig Helser

=== Central Missouri ===
Central Missouri at Emporia State

Team	1	2	3	4	Total
• Central Missouri	7	0	14	16	37
#15 Emporia State	14	7	3	7	31

- Date: September 23
- Location: Welch Stadium, Emporia, KS
- Game start: 2:00 pm CDT
- Elapsed time: 3:23
- Game attendance: 5,023
- Game weather: Sunny, 88°F
- Referee: Dwight Neibling

=== Central Oklahoma ===
Emporia State at Central Oklahoma

Team	1	2	3	4	Total
Emporia State	7	14	17	14	52
• Central Oklahoma	7	22	0	24	53

- Date: September 30
- Location: Wantland Stadium, Edmond, OK
- Game start: 2:00 pm CDT
- Elapsed time: 3:20
- Game attendance: 3,845
- Game weather: Partly cloudy, 75°F

=== Northeastern State ===
Northeastern State at Emporia State

Team	1	2	3	4	Total
Northeastern State	0	0	0	7	7
• Emporia State	13	21	10	0	44

- Date: October 7
- Location: Welch Stadium, Emporia, KS
- Game start: 2:00 pm CDT
- Elapsed time: 3:05
- Game attendance: 4,702
- Game weather: Sunny, 73°F
- Referee: Craig Helser

=== Lindenwood ===
Emporia State at Lindenwood

Team	1	2	3	4	Total
• Emporia State	14	0	6	21	41
Lindenwood	0	7	7	16	30

- Date: October 14
- Location: Hunter Stadium, St. Charles, MO
- Game start: 1:00 pm CDT
- Elapsed time: 3:18
- Game attendance: 2,751
- Game weather: Partly cloudy, 86°F
- Referee: Scott Hardin

=== Pittsburg State ===
Pittsburg State at Emporia State

Team	1	2	3	4	Total
• Pittsburg State	7	7	10	3	27
Emporia State	7	0	3	0	10

- Date: October 21
- Location: Welch Stadium, Emporia, KS
- Game start: 2:00 pm CDT
- Elapsed time: 2:42
- Game attendance: 4,667
- Game weather: Cloudy, rain, windy, 72°F
- Referee: Lonnie Brickman

=== Fort Hays State ===
Emporia State at Fort Hays State

Team	1	2	3	4	Total
Emporia State	0	0	0	7	7
• #7 Fort Hays State	7	6	14	7	34

- Date: October 28
- Location: Lewis Field Stadium, Hays, KS
- Game start: 2:00 pm CDT
- Elapsed time: 2:52
- Game attendance: 4,519
- Game weather: Sunny and cool, 53°F
- Referee: Scott Hardin

=== Missouri Western ===
Missouri Western at Emporia State

Team	1	2	3	4	Total
Missouri Western	10	7	3	7	27
• Emporia State	7	3	7	13	30

- Date: November 4
- Location: Welch Stadium, Emporia, KS
- Game start: 2:00 pm CDT
- Elapsed time: 3:09
- Game attendance: 3,805
- Game weather: Mostly cloudy, 89°F
- Referee: Sean Johnston

=== Washburn ===
Washburn at Emporia State

Team	1	2	3	4	Total
Washburn	7	10	0	3	20
• Emporia State	7	16	3	0	26

- Date: November 11
- Location: Welch Stadium, Emporia, KS
- Game start: 2:00 pm CST
- Elapsed time: 3:04
- Game attendance: 4,095
- Game weather: Overcast, 48°F
- Referee: Dwight Neibling

== Personnel ==
=== Coaching staff ===
Along with Higgins, there are 10 assistants.

Name	Position	Seasons at ESU	Alma Mater
Garin Higgins	Head coach	11	Emporia State (1992)
Matt Nardo	Off. Coordinator/Halfbacks	4	Ohio (2005)
Mike LoPorto	Co-Defensive Coordinator/defensive line Coach/Academic Coord.	10	Emporia State (2010)
Bryan Nardo	Co-Defensive Coordinator/linebackers Coach	6	Ohio (2008)
Nathan Linsey	Secondary/special teams Coordinator	6	Emporia State (2010)
Anthony Koehling	Offensive line Coach	3	Ohio (2013)
Antwon Crutcher	Defensive line	2	Ohio (2016)
Daniel Siehndel	Defensive Secondary Coach	2	Southeast Missouri State (2015)
Austin Willis	Running backs/Strength & Conditioning Coach	1	Emporia State (2014)
James Floyd	Inside Receivers Coach	1	Northern Colorado (2016)
Jarrett Sstastny	Offensive line Coach	1	Emporia State (2017)

=== Roster ===
2017 Emporia State Hornets football team roster
Players
Coaches
Offense

Pos.	#	Name	Class
WR	2	Morris Williams II	Sr
WR	4	Jordan Reed	Jr
WR	5	Justin Brown	Jr
WR	6	Louis Dailey	Sr
RB	9	Kai Callins	Jr
WR	10	Jaylon Radel	Jr
WR	11	Mitchell Foote	Jr
QB	12	T'Quan Wallace	So
QB	14	Braxton Marstall	Jr
QB	15	Pat Briningstool	Fr
QB	16	Ethan Anderson	Fr
WR	18	Anthony McGee	Jr
SB	24	Denzel Strong	Jr
RB	25	Ricky VanWeezel	So
RB	26	Landon Nault	Jr
RB	34	Brett Osbern	So
RB	37	J.J. Rivers	So
SB	38	Johnathan Lewis	Fr
SB	43	Luke Berblinger	So
SB	44	Nick Oliver	Jr
OL	53	Jake Warehime	Sr
OL	61	Marlon McKeithen	Jr
OL	62	Cole Cruz	Sr
OL	63	Brance Watts	So
OL	64	Hayden Reed	Fr
OL	66	Wyatt Malcom	Fr
OL	67	Dylan Gall	Sr
OL	69	Joe Pomatto	Sr
OL	70	Andrew Lillich	Jr
OL	71	Zack Fasbender	Jr
OL	72	Dane Riley	Sr
OL	74	Thomas O'Grady	Sr
OL	75	Estevan Arana	So
OL	76	Austin Unterreiner	So
OL	77	Braden Janzen	Jr
OL	78	Stephen Williams	So
OL	79	Tyler Banta	So
SB	80	Trenton Ball	Jr
WR	81	Kirvin Parks	So
WR	82	Tyler Harris	Fr
WR	83	Corey Thomas	Fr
WR	84	Blake Pennington	Fr
WR	85	Seth Surface	So
WR	86	Sean Talley	So
WR	87	Carson Proffitt	Jr
WR	88	Travon Jones	Jr
WR	89	Zach Cahill	Fr

Defense

Pos.	#	Name	Class
DB	1	Marcus Houghton	Sr
DB	3	Ace Mayze	Sr
LB	7	Gabe Cleveland	Sr
DB	8	Gary Woods II	So
LB	17	Orlando Sheets	Jr
DB	19	Dillon Lohr	So
DB	20	Jarett Strode	Sr
DB	21	Marquise Johnson	Jr
DB	22	Roscoe Gatewood	So
DB	23	Asher Goldston	Jr
DB	28	A.J. West	Sr
DB	29	Cole Baird	Fr
DB	30	Kelin Gordon	Fr
LB	31	Remington Whitley	Sr
DB	32	Corey Jackson	Jr
LB	33	Randall Friday	Fr
DB	35	Steve Ray	Fr
LB	36	Logan Thompson	So
LB	41	Patch VanWeezel	Fr
DB	42	Cody Savage	Jr
DB	45	Kyle Rinck	Fr
DB	46	Dan Courtwright	Fr
DB	47	Ramsey Stramel	Sr
LB	50	Klayton Goering	Fr
LB	51	Darric Cashier	Jr
DE	52	Donovan Walker	Sr
DE	54	Logan Powell	Jr
DE	55	Patrick Dugan	Sr
LB	56	Will Mengarelli	Fr
LB	57	Luke Meyer	Fr
LB	58	Immanuel Cason	Jr
LB	59	Jace McDown	Fr
DL	60	Mark Golubski	Fr
DL	65	Ryan Smith	Jr
LB	68	Chad Glademan	Fr
DL	73	Camren Proby	So
DE	90	Parker Bass	Jr
DE	91	Marcellus Edwards	Jr
DL	93	Marek Thompson	So
DE	94	Ugonna Nwarie	Sr
DE	95	Tre'Vaun Ammons	So
DL	96	Jon Denton	Jr
DL	97	Isaiah Miles	Fr
DE	98	Jackson Maase	So
DL	99	Dyllan Haworth	Fr

Special teams

Pos.	#	Name	Class
K	40	Dakota Weaver	Sr
LS	48	Reid Buckingham	Sr
K	49	Justin Marcha	Sr
K	92	Austin Morton	Sr

Head coach

- Garin Higgins

Coordinators/assistant coaches

- See #Coaching staff

Legend

- (C) Team captain
- (S) Suspended
- (I) Ineligible
- Injured
- Redshirt

Roster
Last update: August 1, 2017
