= 2015 Mid-America Intercollegiate Athletics Association football season =

- League: NCAA Division II
- Sport: Football
- Duration: September 3, 2015 – November 14, 2015
- Teams: 12
- TV partner: KSMO-TV (MIAA Network)

2015

Football seasons
- 2014 2016

2015 Mid-America Intercollegiate Athletics Association football standings
	Conf.			Overall
Team	W		L	W		L
No. 1 NW Missouri State $^	11	–	0	15	–	0
No. 8 Emporia State ^	9	–	2	11	–	3
Central Missouri	8	–	3	8	–	3
Fort Hays State #	8	–	3	8	–	4
Central Oklahoma #	6	–	5	7	–	5
Missouri Western	6	–	5	6	–	5
Pittsburg State	6	–	5	6	–	5
Washburn	5	–	6	5	–	6
Lindenwood	3	–	8	3	–	8
Northeastern State	3	–	8	3	–	8
Missouri Southern	1	–	10	1	–	10
Nebraska–Kearney	0	–	11	0	–	11
$ – Conference champion; ^ – NCAA Division II playoff participant; # – bowl participant (Fort Hays State: Mineral Water Bowl, Central Oklahoma: Live United Texarkana Bowl; Rankings from AFCA poll)

The 2015 Mid-America Intercollegiate Athletics Association football season was contested by twelve United States collegiate athletic programs that compete in the Mid-America Intercollegiate Athletics Association (MIAA) under the National Collegiate Athletic Association (NCAA) for the 2015 college football season. The season began on Thursday, September 3, 2015.

== Conference teams ==
School	Nickname	Location	Stadium
Central Missouri	Mules	Warrensburg, Missouri	Audrey J. Walton Stadium
Central Oklahoma	Bronchos	Edmond, Oklahoma	Wantland Stadium
Emporia State	Hornets	Emporia, Kansas	Francis G. Welch Stadium
Fort Hays State	Tigers	Hays, Kansas	Lewis Field
Lindenwood	Lions	St. Charles, Missouri	Hunter Stadium
Missouri Southern	Lions	Joplin, Missouri	Fred G. Hughes Stadium
Missouri Western	Griffons	St. Joseph, Missouri	Spratt Stadium
Nebraska–Kearney	Lopers	Kearney, Nebraska	Ron & Carol Cope Stadium
Northeastern State	Riverhawks	Tahlequah, Oklahoma	Doc Wadley Stadium
Northwest Missouri	Bearcats	Maryville, Missouri	Bearcat Stadium
Pittsburg State	Gorillas	Pittsburg, Kansas	Carnie Smith Stadium
Washburn	Ichabods	Topeka, Kansas	Yager Stadium at Moore Bowl

=== Coaches ===
The only head coach change in the conference is Missouri Southern's Denver Johnson who replaced Daryl Daye.

Please note that the information listed is the information before the season started.

Team	Head coach	Years at school	Overall record	Record at school
Central Missouri	Jim Svoboda	6	91–40	39–19
Central Oklahoma	Nick Bobeck	4	54–25	12–20
Emporia State	Garin Higgins	9	93–56	42–47
Fort Hays State	Chris Brown	5	22–22	
Lindenwood	Patrick Ross	12	101–48	87–41
Missouri Southern	Denver Johnson	1	69–66	0–0
Missouri Western	Jerry Partridge	19	139–71	
Nebraska–Kearney	Josh Lamberson	1	0–0	
Northeastern State	Rob Robinson	2	0–11	
NW Missouri State	Adam Dorrel	5	47–8	
Pittsburg State	Tim Beck	6	47–14	
Washburn	Craig Schurig	14	89–57	

== Preseason outlook ==
Sporting News released their Top-25 on June 8, 2015. Two teams from the conference were ranked in the top 25: #7 Northwest Missouri and #14 Pittsburg State. That same day the Lindy's NCAA Division II Preseason Top 25 was released, where two teams placed in the top 25 from the conference: #6 Pittsburg State and #13 Northwest Missouri.

On August 4, MIAA Media Days was held at Sporting Park in Kansas City. Northwest Missouri was chosen as #1 and Pittsburg State was chosen as #2 for both Coaches and Media polls. The schools were ranked as follows:

On August 17, the American Football Coaches Association released the Preseason Division II Poll. Northwest Missouri State was selected to finish fifth, and Pittsburg State was chosen seventh.

On August 25, D2football.com released its Top 25 poll, which includes three MIAA schools. Pittsburg State ranked 6th, NW Missouri State 8th, and Central Missouri 20th.

	MIAA Coaches
1.	NW Missouri (8)
2.	Pittsburg St. (4)
3.	Central Mo.
4.	Central Ok.
5.	Mo. Western
6.	Fort Hays St.
T7.	Emporia St.
T7.	Washburn
9.	Nebraska–Kearney
10.	Lindenwood
11.	Mo. Southern
12.	Northeastern St.

( ) first place votes

	MIAA Media
1.	NW Missouri (28)
2.	Pittsburg St. (13)
3.	Central Ok.
4.	Mo. Western
5.	Central Mo.
6.	Fort Hays St.
7.	Emporia St.
8.	Washburn
9.	Nebraska–Kearney
10.	Mo. Southern
11.	Lindenwood
12.	Northeastern St.

( ) first place votes

== Schedule ==
The first week of conference play began on Thursday, September 3, 2015. The schedule was subject to change.

=== Week 1 ===
Date	Time	Visiting team	Home team	Site	TV	Result	Attendance	Ref.
September 3, 2015	7:00 p.m.	Missouri Western	Central Missouri	Walton Stadium • Warrensburg, MO		UCM 18–17	8,895	
September 3, 2015	7:07 p.m.	Fort Hays State	Central Oklahoma	Wantland Stadium • Edmond, OK	MIAA-TV	FHSU 30–29	7,189	
September 3, 2015	7:00 p.m.	Emporia State	Missouri Southern	Hughes Stadium • Joplin, MO		ESU 38–20	5,987	
September 3, 2015	7:00 p.m.	Washburn	Lindenwood	Hunter Stadium • St. Charles, MO		LWU 20–14	2,794	
September 3, 2015	7:00 p.m.	No. 7 Northwest Missouri	Nebraska–Kearney	Cope Stadium • Kearney, NE		NWMSU 31–0	7,853	
September 3, 2015	7:00 p.m.	No. 5 Pittsburg State	Northeastern State	Wadley Stadium • Tahlequah, OK		PSU 38–14	3,331	
^{#}Rankings from AFCA Poll. All times are in Central Time.

=== Week 2 ===
Date	Time	Visiting team	Home team	Site	TV	Result	Attendance	Ref.
September 10/12, 2015	7:07/2:00 p.m.	Central Missouri	Emporia State	Welch Stadium • Emporia, KS	MIAA-TV	ESU 45–34	5,785	
September 10, 2015	7:00 p.m.	Northeastern State	Fort Hays State	Lewis Field Stadium • Hays, KS		FHSU 27–13	3,495	
September 10, 2015	7:00 p.m.	Missouri Southern	No. 4 NW Missouri State	Bearcat Stadium • Maryville, MO		NWMSU 48–7	7,111	
September 10/11, 2015	6:00 p.m./11:00 a.m.	Nebraska–Kearney	Washburn	Yager Stadium • Topeka, KS		WU 34–14	5,958	
September 12, 2015	1:00 p.m.	Central Oklahoma	Missouri Western	Spratt Stadium • St. Joseph, MO		MWSU 26–16	4,203	
September 12, 2015	7:00 p.m.	Lindenwood	No. 5 Pittsburg State	Smith Stadium • Pittsburg, KS		PSU 56–28	10,362	
^{#}Rankings from AFCA Poll. All times are in Central Time.

=== Week 3 ===
Date	Time	Visiting team	Home team	Site	TV	Result	Attendance	Ref.
September 19, 2015	1:30 p.m.	No. 3 NW Missouri State	Central Missouri	Walton Stadium • Warrensburg, MO		NWMSU 34–30	9,973	
September 19, 2015	2:00 p.m.	Emporia State	Central Oklahoma	Wantland Stadium • Edmond, OK		ESU 38–28	4,502	
September 19, 2015	6:00 p.m.	Fort Hays State	Lindenwood	Hunter Field • St. Charles, MO		FHSU 30–7	2,976	
September 19, 2015	6:00 p.m.	Nebraska–Kearney	Missouri Southern	Hughes Stadium • Joplin, MO		MSSU 24–14	4,367	
September 19, 2015	2:37 p.m.	Missouri Western	Northeastern State	Wadley Stadium • Tahlequah, OK	MIAA-TV	MWSU 24–17	2,083	
September 19, 2015	7:00 p.m.	Washburn	No. 4 Pittsburg State	Smith Stadium • Pittsburg, KS		WU 28–21	11,383	
^{#}Rankings from AFCA Poll. All times are in Central Time.

=== Week 4 ===
Date	Time	Visiting team	Home team	Site	TV	Result	Attendance	Ref.
September 26, 2015†	3:00 p.m.	Central Missouri	Nebraska–Kearney	Cope Stadium • Kearney, NE		UCM 38–7	4,214	
September 26, 2015	2:37 p.m.	Central Oklahoma	No. 3 NW Missouri State	Bearcat Stadium • Maryville, MO	MIAA-TV	NWMSU 23–16	7,847	
September 26, 2015	2:00 p.m.	Northeastern State	Emporia State	Welch Stadium • Emporia, KS		ESU 55–14	5,093	
September 26, 2015	7:00 p.m.	No. 15 Pittsburg State	Fort Hays State	Lewis Field Stadium • Hays, KS		PSU 31–24	6,043	
September 26, 2015	2:00 p.m.	Lindenwood	Missouri Western	Spratt Stadium • St. Joseph, MO		MWSU 34–14	5,401	
September 26, 2015	1:00 p.m.	Missouri Southern	Washburn	Yager Stadium • Topeka, KS		WU 27–21	4,201	
^{†}Homecoming. ^{#}Rankings from AFCA Poll. All times are in Central Time.

=== Week 5 ===
Date	Time	Visiting team	Home team	Site	TV	Result	Attendance	Ref.
October 3, 2015	1:30 p.m.	Missouri Southern	Central Missouri	Walton Stadium • Warrensburg, MO		UCM 54–10	10,477	
October 3, 2015	2:00 p.m.	Nebraska–Kearney	Central Oklahoma	Wantland Stadium • Edmond, OK		UCO 36–24	4,029	
October 3, 2015	2:37 p.m.	No. 23 Emporia State	Lindenwood	Hunter Stadium • St. Charles, MO	MIAA-TV	ESU 20–13	2,093	
October 3, 2015†	7:00 p.m.	Washburn	Fort Hays State	Lewis Field Stadium • Hays, KS		FHSU 35–30	4,913	
October 3, 2015†	2:00 p.m.	Missouri Western	No. 15 Pittsburg State	Smith Stadium • Pittsburg, KS		PSU 31–27	10,814	
October 3, 2015	1:00 p.m.	No. 3 NW Missouri State	Northeastern State	Wadley Stadium • Tahlequah, OK		NWMSU 59–7	1,593	
^{†}Homecoming. ^{#}Rankings from AFCA Poll. All times are in Central Time.

=== Week 6 ===
Date	Time	Visiting team	Home team	Site	TV	Result	Attendance	Ref.
October 10, 2015	2:37 p.m.	Central Missouri	Washburn	Yager Stadium • Topeka, KS	MIAA-TV	UCM 38–38	4,763	
October 10, 2015	6:00 p.m.	Central Oklahoma	Missouri Southern	Hughes Stadium • Joplin, MO		UCO 55–21	3,755	
October 10, 2015	2:00 p.m.	No. 13 Pittsburg State	No. 18 Emporia State	Welch Stadium • Emporia, KS		ESU 46–42	6,306	
October 10, 2015	1:00 p.m.	Fort Hays State	Missouri Western	Spratt Stadium • St. Joseph, MO		MWSU 26–21	3,406	
October 10, 2015	1:00 p.m.	Lindenwood	No. 3 NW Missouri State	Bearcat Stadium • Maryville, MO		NWMSU 69–0	6,594	
October 10, 2015	2:00 p.m.	Northeastern State	Nebraska–Kearney	Cope Stadium • Kearney, NE		NSU 31–14	3,345	
^{#}Rankings from AFCA Poll. All times are in Central Time.

=== Week 7 ===
Date	Time	Visiting team	Home team	Site	TV	Result	Attendance	Ref.
October 17, 2015	2:00 p.m.	Central Missouri	Central Oklahoma	Wantland Stadium • Edmond, OK		UCM 45–42	2,478	
October 17, 2015	2:00 p.m.	No. 13 Emporia State	Fort Hays State	Lewis Field Stadium • Hays, KS		FHSU 27–24	3,094	
October 17, 2015†	1:30 p.m.	Nebraska–Kearney	Lindenwood	Hunter Stadium • St. Charles, MO		LWU 28–10	2,097	
October 17, 2015	1:00 p.m.	Missouri Southern	Northeastern State	Wadley Stadium • Tahlequah, OK		NSU 31–21	1,512	
October 17, 2015†	2:00 p.m.	Washburn	Missouri Western	Spratt Stadium • St. Joseph, MO		WU 21–7	5,005	
October 17, 2017	2:37 p.m.	No. 3 NW Missouri State	No. 22 Pittsburg State	Smith Stadium • Pittsburg, KS	MIAA-TV	NWMSU 31–14	10,189	
^{†}Homecoming. ^{#}Rankings from AFCA Poll. All times are in Central Time.

=== Week 8 ===
Date	Time	Visiting team	Home team	Site	TV	Result	Attendance	Ref.
October 24, 2015†	1:30 p.m.	Northeastern State	Central Missouri	Walton Stadium • Warrensburg, MO		UCM 54–10	8,279	
October 24, 2015†	1:00 p.m.	Central Oklahoma	Washburn	Yager Stadium • Topeka, KS		UCO 38–27	5,525	
October 24, 2015†	2:00 p.m.	Missouri Western	No. 19 Emporia State	Welch Stadium • Emporia, KS		ESU 17–3	6,056	
October 24, 2015†	2:00 p.m.	Fort Hays State	No. 3 NW Missouri State	Bearcat Stadium • Maryville, MO		NWMSU 45–24	9,082	
October 24, 2015†	2:37 p.m.	Lindenwood	Missouri Southern	Hughes Stadium • Joplin, MO	MIAA-TV	LWU 34–30	4,237	
October 24, 2015	1:00 p.m.	Pittsburg State	Nebraska–Kearney	Cope Stadium • Kearney, NE		PSU 24–19	2,050	
^{†}Homecoming. ^{#}Rankings from AFCA Poll. All times are in Central Time.

=== Week 9 ===
Date	Time	Visiting team	Home team	Site	TV	Result	Attendance	Ref.
October 31, 2015	1:30 p.m.	No. 25 Central Missouri	Lindenwood	Hunter Stadium • St. Charles, MO		UCM 31–0	1,519	
October 31, 2015†	1:00 p.m.	Central Oklahoma	Northeastern State	Wantland Stadium • Tahlequah, OK (President's Cup)		UCO 48–17	2,638	
October 31, 2015	2:00 p.m.	Washburn	No. 17 Emporia State	Welch Stadium • Emporia, KS (Turnpike Tussle)		ESU 47–21	4,821	
October 31, 2015	2:37 p.m.	Nebraska–Kearney	Fort Hays State	Lewis Field Stadium • Hays, KS	MIAA-TV	FHSU 24–7	2,770	
October 31, 2015	2:00 p.m.	Missouri Southern	Pittsburg State	Smith Stadium • Pittsburg, KS		PSU 41–14	8,251	
October 31, 2015	1:00 p.m.	No. 2 NW Missouri State	Missouri Western	Spratt Stadium • St. Joseph, MO		NWMSU 24–10	6,955	
^{†}Homecoming. ^{#}Rankings from AFCA Poll. All times are in Central Time.

=== Week 10 ===
Date	Time	Visiting team	Home team	Site	TV	Result	Attendance	Ref.
November 7, 2015	2:37pm	Pittsburg State	No. 24 Central Missouri	Walton Stadium • Warrensburg, MO	MIAA-TV	UCM 34–6	7,873	
November 7, 2015†	2:00 p.m.	Lindenwood	Central Oklahoma	Wantland Stadium • Edmond, OK		UCO 37–20	6,855	
November 7, 2015	6:00 p.m.	No. 14 Emporia State	No. 2 NW Missouri State	Bearcat Stadium • Maryville, MO	ASN	NWMSU 44–10	6,542	
November 7, 2015	3:00 p.m.	Fort Hays State	Missouri Southern	Hughes Stadium • Joplin, MO		FHSU 42–31	3,475	
November 7, 2015	1:00 p.m.	Nebraska–Kearney	Missouri Western	Spratt Stadium • St. Joseph, MO		MWSU 34–17	2,996	
November 7, 2015	1:00 p.m.	Washburn	Northeastern State	Wadley Stadium • Tahlequah, OK		WU 35–21	2,417	
^{†}Homecoming. ^{#}Rankings from AFCA Poll. All times are in Central Time.

=== Week 11 ===
Date	Time	Visiting team	Home team	Site	TV	Result	Attendance	Ref.
November 14, 2015	2:00 p.m.	No. 20 Central Missouri	Fort Hays State	Lewis Field Stadium • Hays, KS		FHSU 28–14	2,975	
November 14, 2015	2:00 p.m.	Central Oklahoma	Pittsburg State	Smith Stadium • Pittsburg, KS		UCO 49–31	8,138	
November 14, 2015	2:00 p.m.	Nebraska–Kearney	No. 19 Emporia State	Welch Stadium • Emporia, KS		ESU 52–34	3,897	
November 14, 2015	1:30 p.m.	Northeastern State	Lindenwood	Hunter Stadium • St. Charles, MO		NSU 17–14	1,016	
November 14, 2015	1:00 p.m.	Missouri Southern	Missouri Western	Spratt Stadium • St. Joseph, MO		MWSU 63–21	2,147	
November 14, 2015	1:00 p.m.	No. 1 Northwest Missouri	Washburn	Yager Stadium • Topeka, KS		NWMSU 49–13	5,403	
^{#}Rankings from AFCA Poll. All times are in Central Time.

=== Postseason ===
==== NCAA Division II playoffs ====
Date	Time	Visiting team	Home team	Site	TV	Result	Attendance	Ref.
November 21	1:00 p.m.	No. 18 Emporia State	No. 6 MSU–Mankato	Blakeslee Stadium • Mankato, MN		W 51–49	1,104	
November 28	1:00 p.m.	No. 11 Humboldt State	No. 1 NW Missouri St.	Bearcat Stadium • Maryville, MO		W 54–7	4,160	
November 28	1:00 p.m.	No. 18 Emporia State	No. 8 Henderson State	Carpenter-Haygood Stadium • Arkadelphia, AR		W 29–3	1,129	
December 5	1:00 p.m.	No. 18 Emporia State	No. 1 NW Missouri St.	Bearcat Stadium • Maryville, MO		NWMSU 38–17	5,155	
December 12	2:30 p.m.	No. 7 West Georgia	No. 1 NW Missouri St.	Bearcat Stadium • Maryville, MO	ESPN 3	W 38–23	5,522	
December 19	3:00 p.m.	No. 12 Shepherd	No. 1 NW Missouri St.	Children's Mercy Park • Kansas City, KS (National Championship)	ESPN 2	W 34–7	16,181	
^{#}Rankings from AFCA Poll. All times are in Central Time.

==== Bowls ====
Date	Time	Visiting team	Home team	Site	TV	Result	Attendance	Ref.
December 5	Noon	Fort Hays State	Minnesota–Duluth	Tiger Stadium • Excelsior Springs, MO (Mineral Water Bowl)		L 30–22	2,300	
December 5	Noon	Central Oklahoma	Southwestern Oklahoma St.	Razorback Stadium • Texarkana, AR (Live United Texarkana Bowl)		W 38–21	5,583	
^{#}Rankings from AFCA Poll. All times are in Central Time.

== Home game attendance ==
Team	Stadium	Capacity	Game 1	Game 2	Game 3	Game 4	Game 5	Game 6	Total	Average	% of Capacity
Central Missouri	Audrey J. Walton Stadium	10,000	8,895	9,973	10,477	8,279	7,873	–	37,497	7,499	74.99%
Central Oklahoma	Wantland Stadium	10,000	7,189	4,502	4,029	2,478	6,855	–	25,053	5,010	50.1%
Emporia State	Francis G. Welch Stadium	7,000	5,785	5,093	6,306	6,056	4,821	3,897	31,958	5,326	76.08%
Fort Hays State	Lewis Field Stadium	6,362	3,495	6,043	4,913	3,094	2,770	2,975	23,290	3,881	61%
Lindenwood	Hunter Stadium	7,450	2,794	2,976	2,093	2,097	1,519	1,016	12,495	2,082	27.94%
Missouri Southern	Fred G. Hughes Stadium	7,000	5,987	4,367	3,755	4,237	3,475	–	21,821	4,364	49.64%
Missouri Western	Spratt Stadium	7,200	4,203	5,401	3,406	5,005	6,955	2,147	27,117	4,519	62.76%
Nebraska–Kearney	Ron & Carol Cope Stadium	5,250	7,853	4,214	3,345	2,050	2,996	–	20,458	4,091	77.92%
Northeastern State	Doc Wadley Stadium	8,300	3,331	2,083	1,593	1,512	2,638	2,417	13,574	2,262	27.25%
NW Missouri State	Bearcat Stadium	6,500	7,111	7,847	6,594	9,082	6,542	–	37,176	7,435	114.38%
Pittsburg State	Carnie Smith Stadium	7,950	10,362	11,383	10,814	10,189	8,251	8,138	59,137	9,856	123.97%
Washburn	Yager Stadium at Moore Bowl	7,200	5,958	4,201	4,763	5,525	5,403	–	20,850	4,170	57.91%
