= 2015 Emporia State Hornets football team =

American college football season

2015 Emporia State Hornets football

NCAA Division II Quarterfinal, L 17–38 at Northwest Missouri State
- Conference: Mid-America Intercollegiate Athletics Association

Ranking
- Coaches: No. 8
- Record: 11–3 (9–2 MIAA)
- Head coach: Garin Higgins (9th season)
- Offensive coordinator: Matt Nardo (1st season)
- Defensive coordinator: Mike LoPorto (8th season)
- Co-defensive coordinator: Bryan Nardo (4th season)
- Home stadium: Francis G. Welch Stadium

2015 Mid-America Intercollegiate Athletics Association football standings
	Conf.			Overall
Team	W		L	W		L
No. 1 NW Missouri State $^	11	–	0	15	–	0
No. 8 Emporia State ^	9	–	2	11	–	3
Central Missouri	8	–	3	8	–	3
Fort Hays State #	8	–	3	8	–	4
Central Oklahoma #	6	–	5	7	–	5
Missouri Western	6	–	5	6	–	5
Pittsburg State	6	–	5	6	–	5
Washburn	5	–	6	5	–	6
Lindenwood	3	–	8	3	–	8
Northeastern State	3	–	8	3	–	8
Missouri Southern	1	–	10	1	–	10
Nebraska–Kearney	0	–	11	0	–	11
$ – Conference champion; ^ – NCAA Division II playoff participant; # – bowl participant (Fort Hays State: Mineral Water Bowl, Central Oklahoma: Live United Texarkana Bowl; Rankings from AFCA poll)

The 2015 Emporia State Hornets football team represented Emporia State University in the 2015 NCAA Division II football season. The Hornets played their home games on Jones Field at Francis G. Welch Stadium in Emporia, Kansas, as they have done since 1937. 2015 was the 122nd season in school history. The Hornets were led by head coach Garin Higgins, who finished his fifteenth overall season, and ninth at Emporia State. Emporia State is a member of the Mid-America Intercollegiate Athletics Association.

== Schedule ==
Date	Time	Opponent	Rank	Site	TV	Result	Attendance
September 3	7:00 p.m.	at Missouri Southern		Fred G. Hughes Stadium; Joplin, MO		W 38–20	5,987
September 10/12	7:07 p.m./2:00 p.m.	Central Missouri		Francis G. Welch Stadium; Emporia, KS	MIAA-TV	W 45–34	5,785
September 19	2:00 p.m.	at Central Oklahoma		Wantland Stadium; Edmond, OK		W 38–28	4,502
September 26	2:00 p.m.	Northeastern State		Francis G. Welch Stadium; Emporia, KS		W 55–14	5,093
October 3	2:37 p.m.	at Lindenwood	No. 23	Harlen C. Hunter Stadium; St. Charles, MO	MIAA-TV	W 20–13	2,093
October 10	2:00 p.m.	No. 13 Pittsburg State	No. 18	Francis G. Welch Stadium; Emporia, KS		W 46–42	6,306
October 17	2:00 p.m.	at Fort Hays State	No. 13	Lewis Field Stadium; Hays, KS		L 24–27	3,094
October 24	2:00 p.m.	Missouri Western^{†}	No. 19	Francis G. Welch Stadium; Emporia, KS		W 17–3	6,056
October 31	2:00 p.m.	Washburn	No. 17	Francis G. Welch Stadium; Emporia, KS (rivalry)		W 47–21	4,821
November 7	6:00 p.m.	at No. 2 Northwest Missouri State	No. 14	Bearcat Stadium; Maryville, MO	ASN	L 10–44	6,542
November 14	2:00 p.m.	Nebraska–Kearney	No. 19	Francis G. Welch Stadium; Emporia, KS		W 52–34	3,897
November 21	1:00 p.m.	at No. 6 Minnesota State*	No. 18	Blakeslee Stadium; Mankato, MN (NCAA Division II First Round)		W 51–49	1,104
November 28	1:00 p.m.	at No. 8 Henderson State*	No. 18	Carpenter–Haygood Stadium; Arkadelphia, AR (NCAA Division II Second Round)		W 29–3	1,129
December 5	1:00 p.m.	at No. 1 NW Missouri State*	No. 18	Bearcat Stadium; Maryville, MO (NCAA Division II Quarterfinal)		L 17–38	5,155
*Non-conference game; ^{†}Homecoming; Rankings from AFCA Poll released prior to the game; All times are in Central time

== Game summaries ==
=== Missouri Southern ===
Emporia State at Missouri Southern

Team	1	2	3	4	Total
• Emporia State	7	10	21	0	38
Missouri Southern	3	7	10	0	20

- Date: September 3
- Location: Hughes Stadium, Joplin, MO
- Game start: 7:00 p.m. CDT
- Elapsed time: 2:45
- Game attendance: 5,987
- Game weather: Clear, 89 °F (32 °C)
- Referee: John Adams

=== Central Missouri ===
Central Missouri at Emporia State

Team	1	2	3	4	Total
Central Missouri	14	10	7	3	34
• Emporia State	3	21	7	14	45

- Date: September 10/12
- Location: Welch Stadium, Emporia, KS
- Game start: 7:07 p.m./2:00 p.m. CDT
- Elapsed time: 3:05
- Game attendance: 5,785
- Game weather: Mostly clear, 89 °F (32 °C)
- Referee: Dwight Neibling

=== Central Oklahoma ===
Emporia State at Central Oklahoma

Team	1	2	3	4	Total
• Emporia State	7	14	7	10	38
Central Oklahoma	7	7	7	7	28

- Date: September 19
- Location: Wantland Stadium, Edmond, OK
- Game start: 2:00 p.m. CDT
- Elapsed time: 3:02
- Game attendance: 4,502
- Game weather: Cloudy, 89 °F (32 °C)
- Referee: Brian Moore

=== Northeastern State ===
Northeastern State at Emporia State

Team	1	2	3	4	Total
Northeastern State	0	7	7	0	14
• Emporia State	21	21	10	3	55

- Date: September 26
- Location: Welch Stadium, Emporia, KS
- Game start: 2:00 p.m. CDT
- Elapsed time: 2:48
- Game attendance: 5,093
- Game weather: Sunny, 80 °F (27 °C)
- Referee: Danny Harris

=== Lindenwood ===
Emporia State at Lindenwood

Team	1	2	3	4	Total
• #23 Emporia State	7	7	0	6	20
Lindenwood	0	3	7	3	13

- Date: October 3
- Location: Hunter Stadium, St. Charles, MO
- Game start: 2:37 p.m. CDT
- Elapsed time: 2:57
- Game attendance: 2,093
- Game weather: Cloudy, 56 °F (13 °C)
- Referee: John Steiger

=== Pittsburg State ===
Pittsburg State at Emporia State

Team	1	2	3	4	Total
#13 Pittsburg State	14	14	7	7	42
• #18 Emporia State	7	15	10	14	46

- Date: October 10
- Location: Welch Stadium, Emporia, KS
- Game start: 2:00 p.m. CDT
- Elapsed time: 3:24
- Game attendance: 6,306
- Game weather: Sunny, 74 °F (23 °C)
- Referee: Sean Johnson

=== Fort Hays State ===
Emporia State at Fort Hays State

Team	1	2	3	4	Total
#13 Emporia State	10	0	0	14	24
• Fort Hays State	0	6	7	14	27

- Date: October 17
- Location: Lewis Field, Hays, KS
- Game start: 2:00 p.m. CDT
- Elapsed time: 2:48
- Game attendance: 3,094
- Game weather: Overcast, 61 °F (16 °C)
- Referee: Darewin Clardy

=== Missouri Western ===
Missouri Western at Emporia State

Team	1	2	3	4	Total
Missouri Western	0	0	0	3	3
• #19 Emporia State	0	7	0	10	17

- Date: October 24
- Location: Welch Stadium, Emporia, KS
- Game start: 2:00 p.m. CDT
- Elapsed time: 2:54
- Game attendance: 6,056
- Game weather: Mostly clear, 63 °F (17 °C)
- Referee: Craig Helser

=== Washburn ===
Washburn at Emporia State

Team	1	2	3	4	Total
Washburn	0	7	7	7	21
• #17 Emporia State	13	24	3	7	47

- Date: October 31
- Location: Welch Stadium, Emporia, KS
- Game start: 2:00 p.m. CDT
- Elapsed time: 2:53
- Game attendance: 4,821
- Game weather: Overcast, 56 °F (13 °C)
- Referee: Dwight Neibling

=== Northwest Missouri State ===
Emporia State at Northwest Missouri State

Team	1	2	3	4	Total
#14 Emporia State	0	10	0	0	10
• #2 NW Missouri State	14	14	9	7	44

- Date: November 7
- Location: Bearcat Stadium, Maryville, MO
- Game start: 6:00 p.m. CST
- Elapsed time: 3:10
- Game attendance: 6,542
- Game weather: Clear, 50s°F
- Referee: Craig Hesler

=== Nebraska–Kearney ===
Nebraska–Kearney at Emporia State

Team	1	2	3	4	Total
Nebraska–Kearney	14	6	7	7	34
• #19 Emporia State	14	7	24	7	52

- Date: November 14
- Location: Welch Stadium, Emporia, KS
- Game start: 2:00 p.m. CST
- Elapsed time: 3:02
- Game attendance: 3,897
- Game weather: Sunny, 69 °F (21 °C)
- Referee: John Adams

=== Minnesota State—NCAA Division II First Round ===
Emporia State at Minnesota State

Team	1	2	3	4	Total
• #18 Emporia State	10	14	21	6	51
#6 Minnesota State	14	14	7	14	49

- Date: November 21
- Location: Blakeslee Stadium, Mankato, MN
- Game start: 1:00 p.m. CST
- Elapsed time: 3:07
- Game attendance: 1,104
- Game weather: Cold & sunny, 28 °F (−2 °C)
- Referee: Bob Rose

=== Henderson State—NCAA Division II Second Round ===
Emporia State at Henderson State

Team	1	2	3	4	Total
• #18 Emporia State	0	16	6	7	29
#8 Henderson State	0	0	0	3	3

- Date: November 28
- Location: Carpenter–Haygood Stadium, Arkadelphia, AR
- Game start: 1:00 p.m. CST
- Elapsed time: 3:35
- Game attendance: 1,129
- Game weather: Rainy, 43 °F (6 °C)
- Referee: Dan Rankin

=== Northwest Missouri State—NCAA Division II Quarterfinal ===
Emporia State at NW Missouri State

Team	1	2	3	4	Total
#18 Emporia State	0	10	7	0	17
• #1 NW Missouri State	10	14	14	0	38

- Date: December 5
- Location: Bearcat Stadium, Maryville, MO
- Game start: 1:00 p.m. CST
- Elapsed time: 2:50
- Game attendance: 5,155
- Game weather: Clear, 40s°F
- Referee: Dwight Neibling

== Personnel ==
=== Coaching staff ===
Along with Higgins, there are 9 assistants.

Name	Position	Seasons at Emporia State	Alma mater
Garin Higgins	Head coach	9	Emporia State (1992)
Mike LoPorto	Co-defensive coordinator/defensive line coach	8	Emporia State (2007)
Bryan Nardo	Co-defensive coordinator/linebackers Coach	4	Ohio (2008)
Matt Nardo	Off. coordinator/recruiting Coord./Inside & H-backs/Receivers coach	1	Ohio (2005)
Nathan Linsey	Def. Secondary/special teams coordinator	4	Emporia State (2010)
Justin Weiser	Strength and conditioning/running backs	3	Emporia State (2010)
Tony Koehling	Offensive line coach	1	Ohio (2013)
Terence Coleman	Outside Receivers	3	NW Oklahoma State (2000)
Chuck Detwiler	Asst. secondary coach	3	Utah State (1974)
Aaron Matthews	Graduate Assistant – Defensive line coach	2	Emporia State (2014)
Justin Drudik	Graduate Assistant – Defensive backs coach	1	Nebraska–Kearney (2014)
Daniel Goodman	Graduate Assistant – Tight ends coach	1	Emporia State (2014)
Damon Leiss	Assistant coach – Defensive lines and Academics	8	Capella (1984)
Patrick Crayton	Receivers (AFCA internship)	2015 season	NWOSU (2004)
Cale Cochran	Football Operations	2	Emporia State (current student)

=== Roster ===
2015 Emporia State Hornets football team roster
Players
Coaches
Offense

Pos.	#	Name	Class
WR	5	Justin Brown	So
WR	6	Kavaski Ervin	Sr
WR	7	Drake Smithton	Sr
WR	10	Mitchell Foote	Jr
QB	13	Ty Reasonor	So
QB	14	Braxton Marstall	So
QB	15	Brent Wilson	Sr
QB	19	Carson Proffitt	Fr
RB	27	Antonio Brown	Jr
RB	40	Kai Callins	So
H	45	Reese Richards	Jr
H	46	Connor Thierolf	Sr
OL	57	Joe Pomatto	So
OL	60	Garron Anthony	Jr
OL	62	Jordan Davis	Fr
OL	64	Jarrett Stastny	Jr
OL	67	Dylan Hall	So
OL	69	Jordan McAdoo	Sr
OL	72	Dane Riley	So
OL	73	Eric Pruitt	Sr
OL	74	Jake Warhime	So
OL	76	Beau Jenkins	Jr
OL	78	Braden Janzen	Fr
OL	79	Kenneth Sellers	Sr
H	80	Trenton Ball	Fr
WR	81	Logan Clothier	Sr
WR	82	Anthony Buffalomeat	Jr
H	86	Nick Oliver	Fr
WR	87	Jaylon Radel	So

Defense

Pos.	#	Name	Class
DB	2	Brandon Gentz	Sr
DB	3	Ace Mayze	Jr
DB	4	Kumani Armstead	So
DL	9	Eddie Vinson	Jr
DE	11	Dominique Jones	Sr
LB	16	Ty McKenzie	Fr
DB	18	J.P Lohrentz	Jr
DB	20	Jarett Strode	Jr
LB	26	Landon Nault	Fr
DB	28	A.J. West	So
DB	29	Curtis Shorts	Jr
LB	30	Seth Culp	Jr
LB	31	Remington Whitley	So
DB	32	Marcus Houghton	So
DB	33	Josh Monteagudo	Jr
LB	34	Jason Tetuan	Sr
DB	35	Elliot Montgomery	Fr
DB	37	Caole Combes	So
LB	38	Kole Schankie	Jr
LB	41	Jarron Ogles	Jr
DB	42	Trey Dickerson	Jr
LB	44	Jordan Robinson	Jr
DL	47	Steele Flemming	Sr
LB	50	Brandon Goodman	Jr
DE	52	Donovan Walker	So
DE	54	Logan Powell	Fr
LB	55	Gabe Cleveland	So
DL	56	Lear Schrader	Sr
LB	58	Immanuel Cason	Fr
DB	59	Drew Cook	Fr
DE	63	Parker Bass	So
DL	65	Ryan Smith	Fr
DL	90	Nick Vega	Jr
DL	91	Darian Harris	Fr
DE	97	Brandon Allen	Sr
DL	98	James Junior	Sr

Special teams

Pos.	#	Name	Class
LS	48	Reid Buckingham	So
K	49	Justin Marcha	So
K	92	Austin Morton	So
K	96	Dakota Weaver	So

Head coach

- Garin Higgins

Coordinators/assistant coaches

- Mike LoPorto
- Bryan Nardo
- Matt Nardo
- Nathan Linsey
- Justin Weiser
- Tony Koehling
- Terence Coleman
- Chuck Detwiler
- Aaron Matthews
- Justin Drudik
- Daniel Goodman
- Damon Leiss
- Cale Cochran
- Patrick Crayton

Legend

- (C) Team captain
- (S) Suspended
- (I) Ineligible
- Injured
- Redshirt

Roster
Last update: May 22, 2015
