= 2019 Emporia State Hornets football team =

American college football season

2019 Emporia State Hornets football
- Conference: Mid-America Intercollegiate Athletics Association
- Record: 4–7 (4–7 MIAA)
- Head coach: Garin Higgins (13th season)
- Co-defensive coordinators: Mike LoPorto (10th season); Bryan Nardo (8th season)
- Home stadium: Francis G. Welch Stadium

2019 Mid-America Intercollegiate Athletics Association football standings
	Conf.			Overall
Team	W		L	W		L
No. 7 NW Missouri State +^	10	–	1	12	–	2
No. 13 Central Missouri +^	10	–	1	11	–	2
Missouri Western #	8	–	3	9	–	3
Fort Hays State	8	–	3	8	–	3
Nebraska–Kearney #	6	–	5	7	–	5
Pittsburg State	6	–	5	6	–	5
Washburn	6	–	5	6	–	5
Central Oklahoma	5	–	6	5	–	6
Emporia State	4	–	7	4	–	7
Missouri Southern	2	–	9	2	–	9
Lincoln (MO)	1	–	10	1	–	10
Northeastern State	0	–	11	0	–	11
+ – Conference co-champions; ^ – NCAA Division II playoff participant; # – bowl participant (Missouri Western: Live United Texarkana Bowl, Nebraska-Kearney: Mineral Water Bowl); Rankings from AFCA poll

The 2019 Emporia State Hornets football team represented Emporia State University in the 2019 NCAA Division II football season. The Hornets played their home games on Jones Field at Francis G. Welch Stadium in Emporia, Kansas, as they had done since 1937. 2019 is the 122nd season in school history. The Hornets were led by head coach Garin Higgins, who was in his 18th season overall, and 13th season at Emporia State as head coach. Emporia State has been a member of the Mid-America Intercollegiate Athletics Association (MIAA) since 1991.

== Schedule ==
Date	Time	Opponent	Site	Result	Attendance
September 5	7:00 p.m.	Northeastern State	Francis G. Welch Stadium; Emporia, KS	W 51–14	4,861
September 14	7:00 p.m.	at No. 23 Pittsburg State	Carnie Smith Stadium; Pittsburg, KS	L 23–47	8,597
September 21	2:00 p.m.	Nebraska–Kearney	Welch Stadium; Emporia, KS	L 21–31	4,087
September 28	6:00 p.m.	at Lincoln (MO)	Dwight T. Reed Stadium; Jefferson City, MO	W 50–7	3,108
October 5	2:00 p.m.	No. 7 Northwest Missouri State	Welch Stadium; Emporia, KS	L 23–34	4,098
October 12	7:00 p.m.	at Fort Hays State	Lewis Field Stadium; Hays, KS	L 3–19	6,735
October 19	2:00 p.m.	No. 15 Central Missouri	Welch Stadium; Emporia, KS	L 27–34	4,532
October 26	1:00 p.m.	at Missouri Western	Spratt Stadium; Saint Joseph, MO	L 0–28	4,583
November 2	2:00 p.m.	Washburn	Francis G. Welch Stadium; Emporia, KS (rivalry)	L 17–37	4,098
November 9	2:00 p.m.	at Missouri Southern	Fred G. Hughes Stadium; Joplin, MO	W 29–6	4,327
November 16	2:00 p.m.	Central Oklahoma	Welch Stadium; Emporia, KS	W 34–14	3,017
Rankings from AFCA Poll released prior to the game; All times are in Central time

== Preseason ==
The Hornets entered the 2018 season after finishing with an 8–4 overall and 7–4 in conference play the previous season under Higgins. The 2019 MIAA Media Day was held on July 31. On The Hornets were chosen to finish sixth in the conference preseason polls by the coaches and media.

== Game summaries ==
=== Northeastern State ===
Northeastern State at Emporia State

Team	1	2	3	4	Total
Northeastern State	0	0	0	14	14
• Emporia State	20	10	14	7	51

- Date: September 5
- Location: Welch Stadium, Emporia, KS
- Game start: 7:00 pm CDT
- Elapsed time: 3:02
- Game attendance: 4,861
- Game weather: Sunny, 90°F
- Referee: James Brockhart

=== Pittsburg State ===
Emporia State at Pittsburg State

Team	1	2	3	4	Total
Emporia State	7	0	8	8	23
• Pittsburg State	0	13	10	24	47

- Date: October 5
- Location: Welch Stadium, Emporia, KS
- Game start: 2:00 pm CDT
- Elapsed time: 3:08
- Game attendance: 8,597
- Game weather: Clear skies, 87°F
- Referee: Bob Pritchett

=== Nebraska–Kearney ===
Nebraska–Kearney at Emporia State

Team	1	2	3	4	Total
• Nebraska–Kearney	7	10	7	7	31
Emporia State	0	6	15	0	21

- Date: September 21
- Location: Welch Stadium, Emporia, KS
- Game start: 2:00 pm CDT
- Elapsed time: 2:54
- Game attendance: 4,087
- Game weather: Overcast, 78°F
- Referee: Brian Moore

=== Lincoln (MO) ===
Emporia State at Lincoln (MO)

Team	1	2	3	4	Total
• Emporia State	13	13	21	3	50
Lincoln (MO)	7	0	0	0	7

- Date: September 28
- Location: Dwight T. Reed Stadium, Jefferson City, MO
- Game start: 6:00 pm CDT
- Elapsed time: 2:51
- Game attendance: 3,108
- Game weather: Overcast, 72°F
- Referee: Scott Hardin

=== Northwest Missouri State ===
Northwest Missouri State at Emporia State

Team	1	2	3	4	Total
• #7 Northwest Missouri State	5	7	19	3	34
Emporia State	10	7	6	0	23

- Date: October 5
- Location: Welch Stadium, Emporia, KS
- Game start: 2:00 pm CDT
- Elapsed time: 3:03
- Game attendance: 4,098
- Game weather: Cloudy, 71°F
- Referee: Gary Anspach

=== Fort Hays State ===
Emporia State at Fort Hays State

Team	1	2	3	4	Total
Emporia State	0	0	3	0	3
• Fort Hays State	3	13	3	0	19

- Date: October 12
- Location: Lewis Field Stadium, Hays, KS
- Game start: 7:00 pm CDT
- Elapsed time: 2:35
- Game attendance: 6,735
- Game weather: Cool, 65°F
- Referee: Bob Pritchett

=== Central Missouri ===
Central Missouri at Emporia State

Team	1	2	3	4	Total
• #14 Central Missouri	10	10	6	8	34
Emporia State	7	13	0	7	27

- Date: October 19
- Location: Welch Stadium, Emporia, KS
- Game start: 2:00 pm CDT
- Elapsed time: 3:18
- Game attendance: 4,532
- Game weather: Mostly clear, 67°F
- Referee: Scott Hardin

=== Missouri Western ===
Emporia State at Missouri Western

Team	1	2	3	4	Total
Emporia State	0	0	0	0	0
• Missouri Western	7	14	0	7	28

- Date: October 26
- Location: Spratt Stadium, Saint Joseph, MO
- Game start: 1:00 pm CDT
- Elapsed time: 3:00
- Game attendance: 4,583
- Game weather: Partly sunny, 53°F
- Referee: Dwight Neibling

=== Washburn ===
Washburn at Emporia State

Team	1	2	3	4	Total
• Washburn	14	14	7	2	37
Emporia State	7	3	7	0	17

- Date: November 2
- Location: Welch Stadium, Emporia, KS
- Game start: 2:00 pm CDT
- Elapsed time: 2:43
- Game attendance: 4,098
- Game weather: Sunny, 53°F
- Referee: James Brookhart

=== Missouri Southern ===
Emporia State at Missouri Southern

Team	1	2	3	4	Total
• Emporia State	3	6	13	7	29
Missouri Southern	0	0	0	6	6

- Date: November 9
- Location: Fred G. Hughes Stadium, Joplin, MO
- Game start: 3:00 pm CST
- Elapsed time: 3:04
- Game attendance: 4,327
- Game weather: Clear, 62°F
- Referee: John Adams

=== Central Oklahoma ===
Central Oklahoma at Emporia State

Team	1	2	3	4	Total
Central Oklahoma	0	7	7	0	14
• Emporia State	10	7	0	17	34

- Date: November 16
- Location: Welch Stadium, Emporia, KS
- Game start: 2:00 pm CST
- Elapsed time: 2:42
- Game attendance: 3,017
- Game weather: Sunny, 60°F
- Referee: Craig Helser

== Personnel ==
=== Coaching staff ===
Along with Higgins, there are 9 assistants.

Name	Position	Seasons at ESU	Alma mater
Garin Higgins	Head coach	13	Emporia State (1992)
Bryan Nardo	Co-defensive coordinator/linebackers Coach	8	Ohio (2008)
Mike LoPorto	Co-defensive coordinator/defensive line coach	10	Emporia State (2010)
Nathan Linsey	Defensive Secondary/special teams coordinator	8	Emporia State (2010)
Cayden Cochran	Passing Game/recruiting coordinator/Receivers	2	Valdosta State (2013)
Tony Koehling	Running game coordinator/offensive line coach	5	Ohio (2013)
Daniel Goodman	Strength and conditioning coach/running backs	2	Emporia State (2015)
Jermaine Lopez	Special Teams Quality Control	1	Emporia State (2017)
Evan Porter	Offensive Quality Control	1	Emporia State (2017)
Ethan Sharp	Defensive Quality Control	1	Emporia State (2017)

=== Roster ===
2019 Emporia State Hornets football team roster
Players
Coaches
Offense

Pos.	#	Name	Class
WR	2	Travon Jones	Jr
WR	4	Corey Thomas	So
QB	5	Dalton Cowan	So
RB	9	Kai Callins	GS
QB	10	Braden Gleason	Fr
WR	12	Wil Amos	Fr
WR	13	JT Mackey	Jr
RB	14	Billy Ross Jr.	Fr
QB	15	Pat Briningstool	Jr
QB	16	Ethan Anderson	Jr
RB	17	Juwan Johnson	Jr
RB	22	Carlos Grace	Jr
RB	23	Jordan Birch	Jr
RB	25	Vinnie Shabazz	Jr
RB	32	Jack Petz	Fr
RB	35	Calvin Boyce	Fr
RB	36	Noah Diaz	So
RB	37	Clay Phillips	Fr
SB	45	Dan Courtwright	So
WR	48	Cole Schumacker	So
SB	49	Case Cochran	Fr
OL	53	Jarrett Roy	Jr
OL	61	Marlon McKeithen	Sr
OL	62	Will Valentas	Jr
OL	63	Stu Habbart	Fr
OL	64	Hayden Reed	So
OL	65	Denton Sanchez	So
OL	66	Colton Dodd	Fr
OL	67	Aaron Clark	Fr
OL	69	Gus Woeppel	Fr
OL	71	Brandon Kane	Fr
OL	72	Xavier Cason	So
OL	73	Chase Merkey	Fr
OL	74	Miles Wade	So
OL	75	Estevan Arana	Sr
OL	76	Austin Unterreiner	Sr
OL	77	Dante Smith-Posey	Fr
OL	78	Stephen Williams	Sr
OL	79	Tyler Banta	Jr
WR	81	Dexton Swinehart	Fr
SB	82	Sam Pascuzzi	Fr
WR	83	Tyler Kahmann	Fr
WR	84	Kai Lemons	Jr
WR	85	Seth Surface	Sr
WR	86	Sean Talley	Jr
WR	87	Jack Schneider	Fr
SB	88	Marcellus Edwards	Sr
SB	89	Zach Cahill	Jr

Defense

Pos.	#	Name	Class
DB	1	Lawson Holbert	Sr
DB	3	Roscoe Gatewood III	Sr
DB	7	Jordan Wallace	Jr
DB	8	Gary Woods II	Sr
DB	11	Dom Venegas	Fr
DB	14	Jordan McDaniel	Fr
DB	18	Trey Morris	So
LB	19	Gee Stanley	Jr
DB	20	Jawill Aldridge	Sr
DB	21	Kyle Rinck	Jr
DB	24	Montrell Wilson	Fr
DB	26	Xavier Hall	Fr
DB	27	Blake Wilson	Jr
DB	28	Jaedon Hall	So
LB	29	Cole Baird	Jr
DB	30	Kelin Gordon	So
LB	31	Jace McDown	Jr
LB	33	Levi Messner	Fr
LB	34	Joshua Carrethers	So
LB	38	Cade Harelson	So
DB	39	Andre Lewis	Jr
DB	41	Cody Ladson	Fr
DB	42	Chance Rodriguez	Fr
LB	43	Dawson Hammes	So
DB	44	Tyree King	So
DB	47	Keshaun Kinsey	Fr
LB	50	Klayton Goering	Jr
LB	51	Jack Barger	Fr
LB	52	Jordan Griffin	Jr
DL	54	Cody Swanson	Jr
LB	55	David Johnson	Fr
LB	56	Brett Sage	So
LB	59	Matt Johnson	So
DL	68	Charlie Suenram	Fr
DL	70	Marquay Shaw	Fr
DL	90	Parker Bass	Sr
DL	91	Jordan Williams	Fr
DL	92	Jahmek Murphy	Sr
DL	93	Marek Thompson	Jr
DL	94	Anthony Burton	So
DL	95	Tre'Vaun Ammons	Sr
DL	96	Hawkens Taylor	So
DL	97	Joseph Stout	Fr
DL	98	Jackson Maase	Sr
DL	99	Dyllan Haworth	Jr

Special teams

Pos.	#	Name	Class
K	40	Sam Dobbins	So
K	46	Clark Schoonover	So
LS	57	Austin Passemore	Sr
P/K	58	Ross Brungardt	Fr
LS	60	Derek Hahn	Fr

Head coach

- Garin Higgins

Coordinators/assistant coaches

- See Coaching staff

Legend

- (C) Team captain
- (S) Suspended
- (I) Ineligible
- Injured
- Redshirt

Roster
Last update: June 28, 2019
