= Yager Stadium =

Yager Stadium can refer to the following sports stadiums:

- Yager Stadium (Miami University), Oxford, Ohio, USA
- Yager Stadium at Moore Bowl, Topeka, Kansas, USA
