= Garin Higgins =

American football player and coach (born 1968)

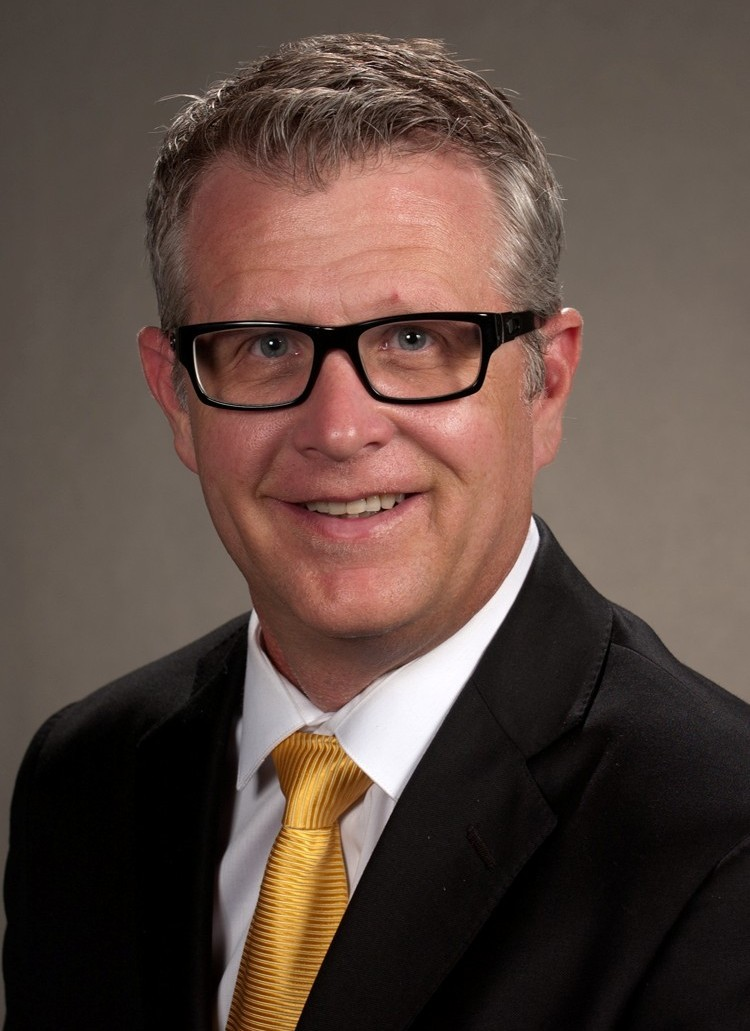

Current position
- Title: Head coach
- Team: Emporia State
- Conference: MIAA
- Record: 118–90
- Annual salary: $142,676

Biographical details
- Born: October 11, 1968 (age 57); Blackwell, Oklahoma, U.S.

Playing career
- 1987–1990: Emporia State
- Position: Quarterback

Coaching career (HC unless noted)
- 1992–1993: Northeastern State (GA)
- 1994–1996: Northwestern Oklahoma State (RB/QB)
- 1997–1999: Northwestern Oklahoma State (OC)
- 2000–2004: Northwestern Oklahoma State
- 2005: Minnesota State–Mankato (co-OC)
- 2006: Northeastern State (OC)
- 2007–present: Emporia State

Head coaching record
- Overall: 169–99
- Bowls: 4–1
- Tournaments: 7–5 (NAIA playoffs); 3–3 (NCAA D-II playoffs)

Accomplishments and honors

Championships
- 5 CSFL (2000–2004)

Awards
- 5× CSFL Coach of the Year (2000–2004)

Garin Higgins (born October 11, 1968) is an American college football coach and former player. He is the head football coach for Emporia State University, a position he has held since 2007. Higgins previously served as the head football coach at Northwestern Oklahoma State University from 2000 to 2004. His Northwestern Oklahoma State Rangers finished as runners-up in the NAIA Football National Championship in 2000 and 2003. Higgins worked as co-offensive coordinator at Minnesota State University, Mankato and offensive coordinator at Northeastern State University in 2006.

== Early life ==
Higgins was born in Blackwell, Oklahoma, on October 11, 1968, where he was an all-state quarterback for the Blackwell High School football team. After graduating high school in 1987, Higgins attended Emporia State University, where he was the quarterback for the football team. While at Emporia State, Higgins helped lead the team to the 1989 NAIA championship game where they lost to Carson–Newman.

== Coaching career ==
After graduating Emporia State in 1992, Higgins served as a graduate assistant at Northeastern State University from 1992 through the 1993 season. In 1994, Higgins left for Northwestern Oklahoma State University (NWOSU) in where he held several positions from 1995 to 1999 including the running backs and quarterbacks coach for the first three seasons, and then moving to offensive coordinator from 1997 to 1999 before being named head coach in after the 1999 season.

=== Northwestern Oklahoma State (2000–2004) ===
On February 14, 2000, Higgins was promoted to head coach at Northwestern Oklahoma State. Coming off of a championship season, Higgins led the Rangers to a 13–1 overall, 5–0 in conference play season, which in return led them being the Central States Football League champions and earned them a NAIA runners-up. The next season, 2001, turned out to be another winning season. Higgins led the Rangers to another conference title, ending the season in the first round of the NAIA postseason with an overall record of 7–3, 4–0 in conference play. In 2002, Higgins led the Rangers to another conference championship with a record of 11–1 overall, 4–0 in conference play, advancing the team to the NAIA quarterfinals.

The following season in 2003, the Rangers won their fifth straight conference championship and advanced finished the season with an overall record of 11–2, 5–0 in conference play earning the runners-up in the NAIA. In 2004, Higgins' last season with the Rangers, the team won their sixth straight conference championship finishing the season in the first round of the NAIA postseason and an overall record of 9–2, 7–0 in conference play. Higgins finished his career at NWOSU with an overall record of 51–9, 25–0 in conference play with a winning percentage of .850. On January 5, 2006, Higgins resigned to become the co-offensive coordinator at Minnesota State–Mankato. In 2006, Higgins returned to Northeastern State to serve as the offensive coordinator for one season.

=== Emporia State (2007–present) ===
==== Rough first five seasons: 2007–2011 ====
On December 14, 2006, Higgins was introduced as the 24th head football coach of Emporia State University, replacing Dave Wiemers who resigned after three consecutive losing seasons. On September 1, 2007, the Hornets opened the season with a 7–3 win over the Western State Colorado Mountaineers, securing his' first win as a coach at his alma mater. Higgins led the Hornets to their first 3–0 season since 2003, but that quickly ended once they began conference play losing their final eight games. The Hornets finished 3–8 overall, 1–8 in conference play. The following season in 2008, Higgins led the Hornets to a 4–7 overall, 2–7 in conference play season with their only two conference wins against Fort Hays State and Truman.

During his third year as head coach of the Hornets, Higgins led his team to the program's lowest overall winning record since 1980 – 2–8. The next season, however, Higgins turned the program around and finished the next two seasons 5–6 overall, and 3–6 in conference play.

==== Next five seasons: success begins (2012–2016) ====
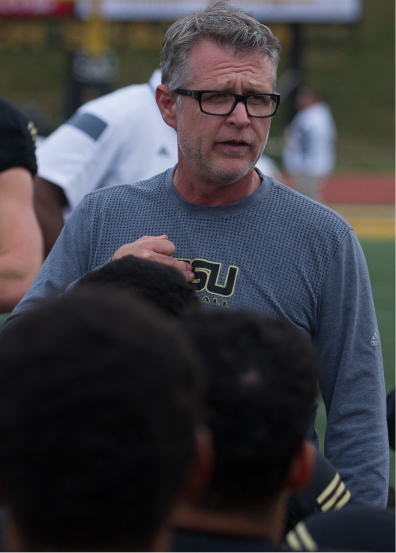
Higgins talking to the team after a win against the Missouri Western Griffons in 2015

During his sixth season at Emporia State, the university had undergone a leadership change. With the new leadership change, came a new atmosphere on campus and Higgins led the Hornets to their first winning season since 2003. The Hornets started the season off strong winning their first eight games – the program's first since 1988 – earning them national rankings as well for the first time since 2003. In the first five games, the Hornets scored 30+ points per game. Finishing 10–2 overall, 9–2 in conference play led Higgins to secure a second-place finish in the MIAA and a bid to the Kanza Bowl where they defeated the Texas A&M–Kingsville Javelinas 45–38. Quarterback Tyler Eckenrode finished his career at Emporia State with school records and as a finalist for the Harlon Hill Trophy.

After a successful season and losing a record-breaking quarterback, the Hornets were chosen to finish in seventh place in the MIAA preseason polls. The Hornets also were starting to receive votes for national rankings, as well. Higgins led the Hornets to another 8–0 start, scoring 35+ points a game. The No. 10 Hornets' winning streak was again snapped to the Northwest Missouri State Bearcats. The Hornets won their next game after against Washburn. Finishing regular season play, Higgins led the Hornets to a 9–1 overall, 9–1 in conference play, advancing to the NCAA Playoffs for the first time since 2003. The Hornets lost to the Minnesota–Duluth Bulldogs 55–13.

Starting his eighth season, the Hornets began the year ranked No. 22 in the preseason AFCA poll. Facing injuries from last season, the Hornets started off with a win against Missouri Southern. Following the first win of the season, the Hornets moved to No. 19 in the polls, but would quickly decline after losing the next two games. The Hornets would go on to win the next two games, but would then lose the next two. The Hornets won one more before losing the last two games, finishing the season 4–7 both overall and in conference play.

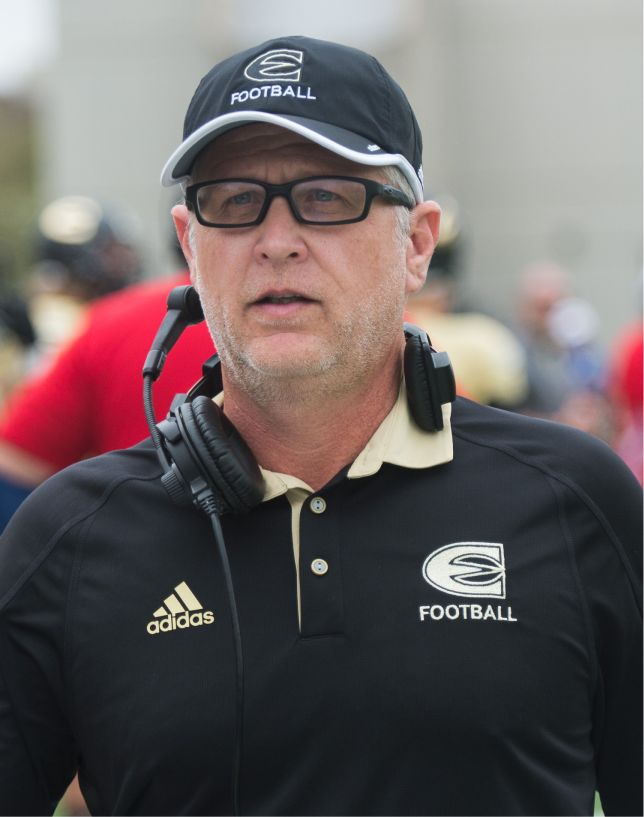
Higgins during a game in 2016

After having their first losing season since 2011, Higgins was quickly able to get the program winning again during his ninth season. The Hornets started the season 6–0, scoring 38+ points in the first five games, and quickly regained their national rankings after being unranked for a year. The second game of the season against Central Missouri was suspended at halftime due to severe weather. At the time the game was suspended, the Hornets were tied with the Mules at 24. The Hornets defeated the Mules two days later 45–34. In the last four games of the season, the Hornets went 3–1, losing to Northwest Missouri State again. Finishing the regular season play, Higgins led the Hornets to a 9–2 overall and in conference play. The Hornets once again returned to the NCAA playoffs winning the first two games, and falling to Northwest Missouri State in the third round. Quarterback Brent Wilson was a finalist for the Harlon Hill Trophy, making him the second Hornet in three years to be named a finalist.

Starting in his tenth season with the Hornets, Higgins began the season with Northwest Missouri State – the first time two nationally ranked teams kicked off the football season inside Francis G. Welch Stadium since it opened in 1937. After Wilson graduated, the quarterback position was open. Higgins selected a redshirt sophomore who had played in during his freshman year when both Wilson and the back-up quarterback were injured. Emporia State opened the season ranked No. 24 nationally and lost its first game against No. 1 and eventual National Champion Northwest Missouri State. From there, the Hornets won the rest of the regular season play finishing the regular season ranked No. 9 and a 10–1 overall and in conference play record. The Hornets also hosted an NCAA Division II playoff game for the first time in school history (the last playoff game was in 1989 for the NAIA where Higgins was a player). In the first game, the Hornets defeated Minnesota–Duluth 59–26, and ended the season in the second round to Northwest Missouri State 44–13.

==== 2017–2022: three more bowls ====
In 2017, Higgins led the Hornets to a 6–5 season, landing a tie for 6th place in conference play. This was the third straight winning season for the Hornets and first time the program didn't make a post-season appearance since 2014. In 2018, the Hornets had another winning season, ending the season with an 8–4 overall record, and 7–4 in conference play tying for fourth place. They returned to postseason play against the Arkansas–Monticello Boll Weevils in the Corsicana Bowl, winning 30–22.

In 2019, the Hornets had a rough year as they ended the season with a 4–7 record both overall and in conference play. In 2020, Emporia State did not field a team due to the corona virus pandemic.

In 2021, the Hornets returned with a 6–6 overall record, and 6–5 conference record tying for fifth place in the MIAA. This led them to the Live United Texarkana Bowl, who which they lost 37–34 to Southeastern Oklahoma State. In 2022, the Hornets had their first season with more than six wins since 2018, ending the season with a 9–3 overall win, 8–3 in conference play, landing third in the conference. The Hornets received their chance to defeat Southeastern Oklahoma State again in the Live United Texarkana Bowl, to which they won 48–27.

== Head coaching record ==
Year	Team	Overall	Conference	Standing	Bowl/playoffs	NAIA^{#}	AFCA^{°}
Northwestern Oklahoma State Rangers (Central States Football League) (2000–2004)
2000	Northwestern Oklahoma State	13–1	5–0	1st	L NAIA Championship	2	
2001	Northwestern Oklahoma State	7–3	4–0	1st	L NAIA First Round	9	
2002	Northwestern Oklahoma State	11–1	4–0	1st	L NAIA Quarterfinal	5	
2003	Northwestern Oklahoma State	11–2	5–0	1st	L NAIA Championship	2	
2004	Northwestern Oklahoma State	9–2	7–0	1st	L NAIA First Round	9	
Northwestern Oklahoma State:		51–9	25–0				
Emporia State Hornets (Mid-America Intercollegiate Athletics Association) (2007–present)
2007	Emporia State	3–8	0–8	9th			
2008	Emporia State	4–7	2–7	T–8th			
2009	Emporia State	2–9	1–8	T–9th			
2010	Emporia State	5–6	3–6	T–6th			
2011	Emporia State	5–6	3–6	T–6th			
2012	Emporia State	10–2	9–2	T–2nd	W Kanza		22
2013	Emporia State	9–2	9–1	2nd	L NCAA Division II First Round		20
2014	Emporia State	4–7	4–7	T–7th			
2015	Emporia State	11–3	9–2	2nd	L NCAA Division II Quarterfinal		8
2016	Emporia State	11–2	10–1	2nd	L NCAA Division II Second Round		9
2017	Emporia State	6–5	6–5	T–6th			
2018	Emporia State	8–4	7–4	T–4th	W Corsicana		
2019	Emporia State	4–7	4–7	9th			
2020–21	No team—COVID-19						
2021	Emporia State	6–6	6–5	T–5th	L Live United Texarkana		
2022	Emporia State	9–3	8–3	3rd	W Live United Texarkana		
2023	Emporia State	9–3	7–3	T–3rd	W Heritage		
2024	Emporia State	7–4	5–4	T–5th			
2025	Emporia State	5–6	4–5	T–6th			
Emporia State:		118–90	97–85				
Total:		169–99					
National championship Conference title Conference division title or championship game berth
^{#}Rankings from AFCA.
