= Austin Willis (American football) =

American football player and coach (born 1992)

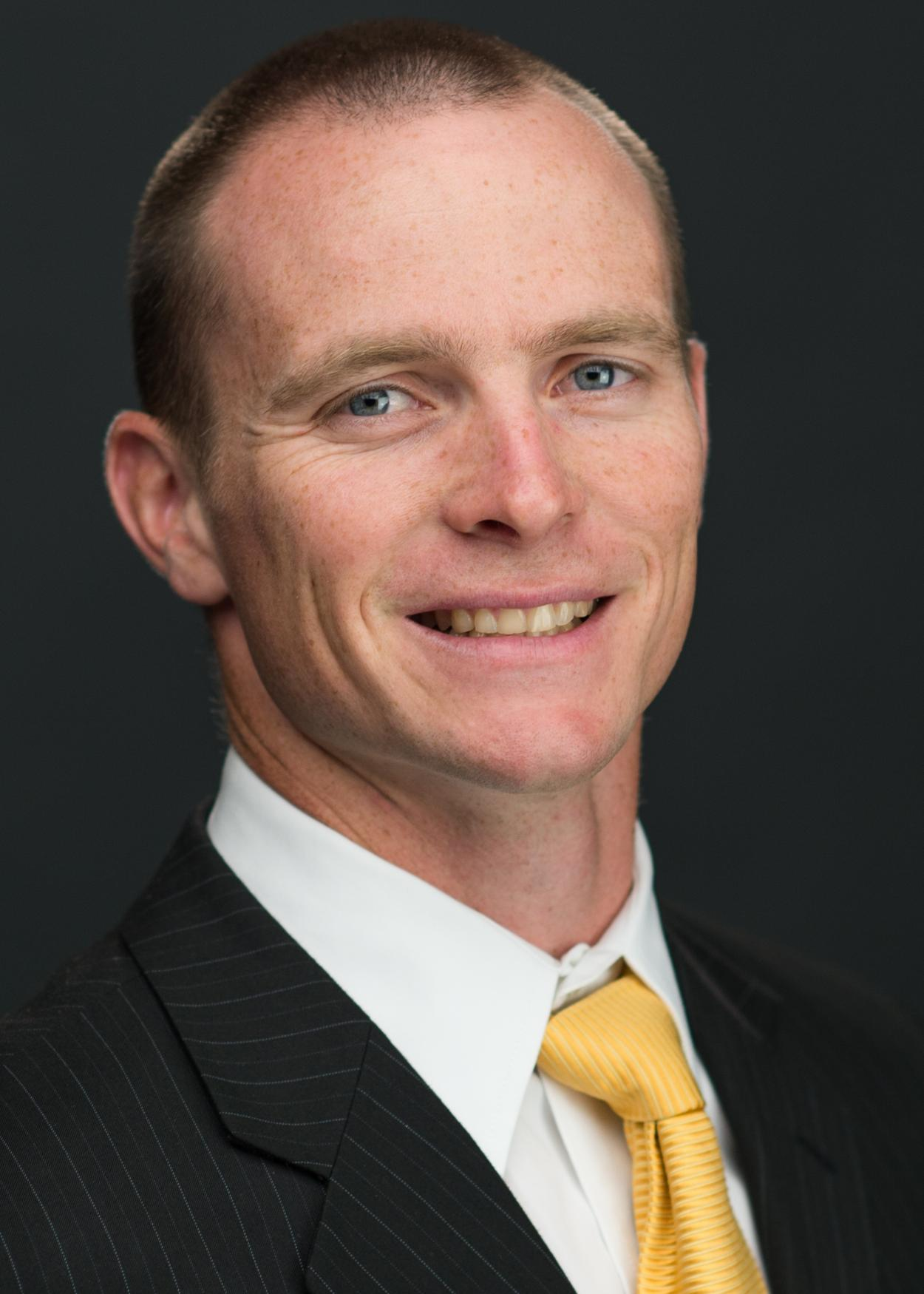

Personal information
- Born: April 13, 1992 (age 34); Topeka, Kansas
- Listed height: 5 ft 9 in (1.75 m)
- Listed weight: 175 lb (79 kg)

Career information
- High school: Shawnee Heights
- College: Emporia State
- NFL draft: 2015: undrafted

Career history

Playing
- Oakland Raiders (2015)*; Buffalo Bills (2015)*; Detroit Lions (2016)*
- * Offseason or practice squad member only

Coaching
- Emporia State (2017–2018) Strength and conditioning/running backs coach

Austin Willis (born April 13, 1992) is an American former football wide receiver. He was signed as an undrafted free agent by the Oakland Raiders after the 2015 NFL Draft. He played college football at Emporia State, where he served as the running backs and strength and conditioning coach from 2017 to 2018.

== Professional career ==
=== Oakland Raiders ===
On May 11, 2015, Willis signed with the Oakland Raiders. On August 18, 2015, he was waived.

=== Buffalo Bills ===
On August 22, 2015, Willis signed to the Buffalo Bills. On August 31, 2015, he was waived and on September 1, 2015, Willis cleared waivers and was placed on injured reserve with a concussion. On September 7, 2015, he was released.

=== Detroit Lions ===
On January 21, 2016, Willis signed to the Detroit Lions. Willis was released by the Lions prior to training camp.
