= Slotback =

Position in gridiron football

The slotback (SB) in the flexbone formation.

Slotback (SB) is an offensive position in gridiron football responsible for covering a ''slot,'' the playing area between the⁣⁣ offensive tackle and the wide receiver. A player who lines up between those two players and behind the line of scrimmage fills that "slot".

The position requires a versatile player who must combine the receiving skills of a wide receiver, blocking skills of a tight end and the ball-carrying skills of a running back. The slotback is a fixture of Canadian football and indoor football, primarily as an extra receiver. The position is also used in American football. In the modern NFL, the slotback is often referred to as the "flex".

Slotbacks can line up as far as 5 yards behind the line of scrimmage when the ball is snapped. In both Canadian and indoor football, slotbacks can make a running start toward the line of scrimmage before the snap. In the NFL, this would be called illegal motion. However, other American football leagues, such as the World Football League and the XFL, have allowed forward motion.

== Role ==
While sometimes used at running back, slotbacks are predominantly receivers who provide pass protection on blitzes or blocking in running plays. Due to lining up closer to the ⁣⁣quarterback, they may be preferred over a wide receiver or tight end for receiving short passes or hand-offs. In American football, a team who lines up in a formation containing a slotback has to run the play without a tight end, fullback, or running back since there are only 11 players allowed on offense and 7 of those are on the line of scrimmage. This is one of the reasons why slotbacks are less common in the American game.

In Canadian football, there are 12 players per side on the field. With 3 downs, the CFL is a much more pass-heavy game. Slotbacks are similar to wide receivers, with the exception that they line up closer to the quarterback and can use the waggle (motion before the snap). Canadian slotbacks rarely run the ball and are almost always sent out to receive passes. They will block on the lesser-called run plays, as the tight end position is essentially obsolete in the CFL.

A slotback is typically treated as a third wide receiver and may be expected to be a "possession receiver" that can reliably catch a pass when covered by a safety since they are most commonly used when converting medium-distance third-down conversions.

Slotbacks are used effectively in the flexbone formation where they are used as extra receivers. They are usually relatively smaller and faster players and are used for short passes and short runs to get extra yards or a first down or third down drive.

Players are not drafted to the slotback position in the NFL; it is filled as needed by a wide receiver or running back with the necessary skill set to effectively play the position. Slotbacks must be able to block, catch, and evade tacklers while still being highly productive. In 2019, the Navy Midshipmen football team's slotbacks gained over 1,500 all-purpose yards.

== See also ==
- H-back, a similar position.
