= Audrey J. Walton Stadium (Central Missouri) =

Football stadium in Warrensburg, Missouri

Coordinates: 38.7588°N 93.7427°W

Audrey J. Walton Stadium at Vernon Kennedy Field
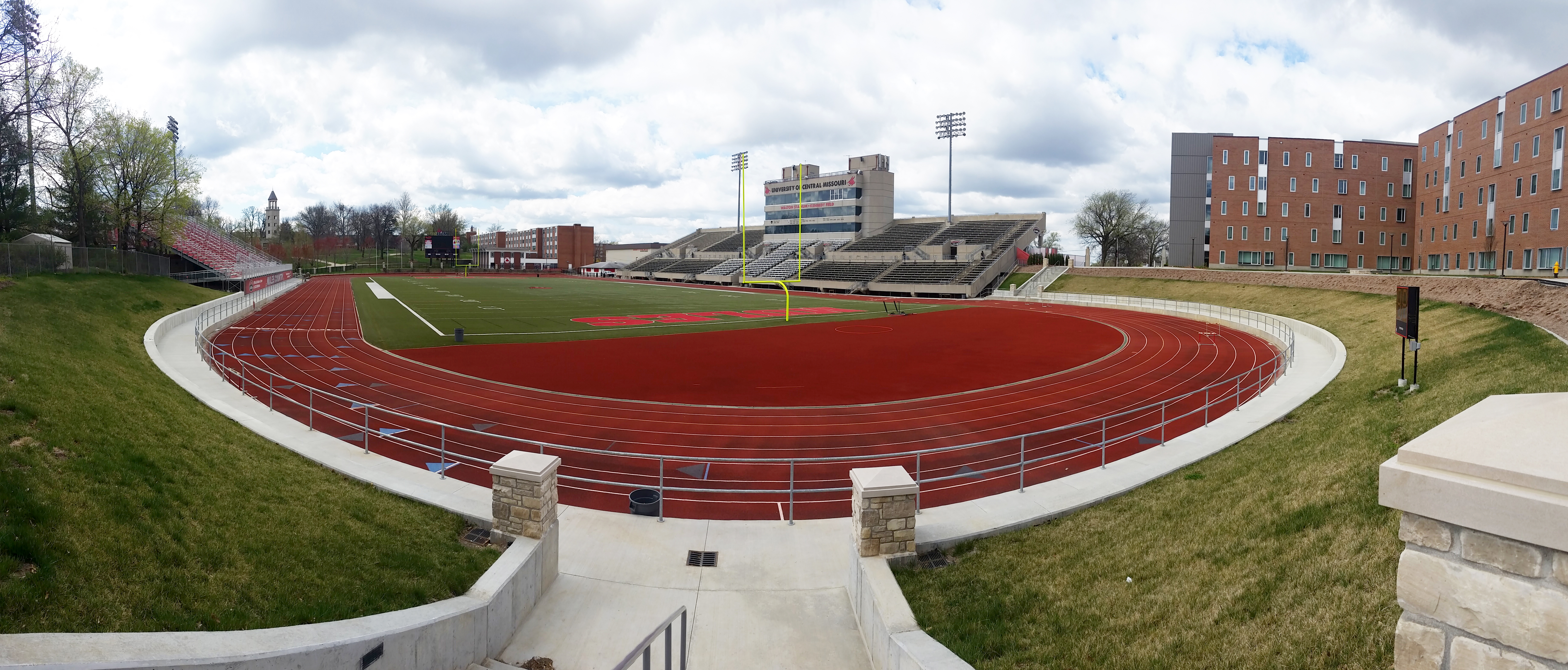
- Audrey J. Walton Stadium overlooking the Northeast corner
- Interactive map of Audrey J. Walton Stadium at Vernon Kennedy Field
- Former names: West Campus Field (1928-1954); Vernon Kennedy Field (1954-1995)
- Location: Warrensburg, Missouri 64093
- Owner: University of Central Missouri
- Operator: University of Central Missouri
- Capacity: 12,000
- Surface: Grass: 1928–2004; Sprinturf: 2005–present

Construction
- Groundbreaking: 1928
- Opened: September 28, 1928
- Renovated: 2005
- Expanded: 1995, 2004, 2014

Tenant
- Central Missouri Mules (NCAA) (1928–present)

Audrey J. Walton Stadium is a stadium in Warrensburg, Missouri. It is primarily used for American football, and is the home field of the University of Central Missouri. The stadium holds 12,000 people and opened in 1928 originally being called West Campus Field.

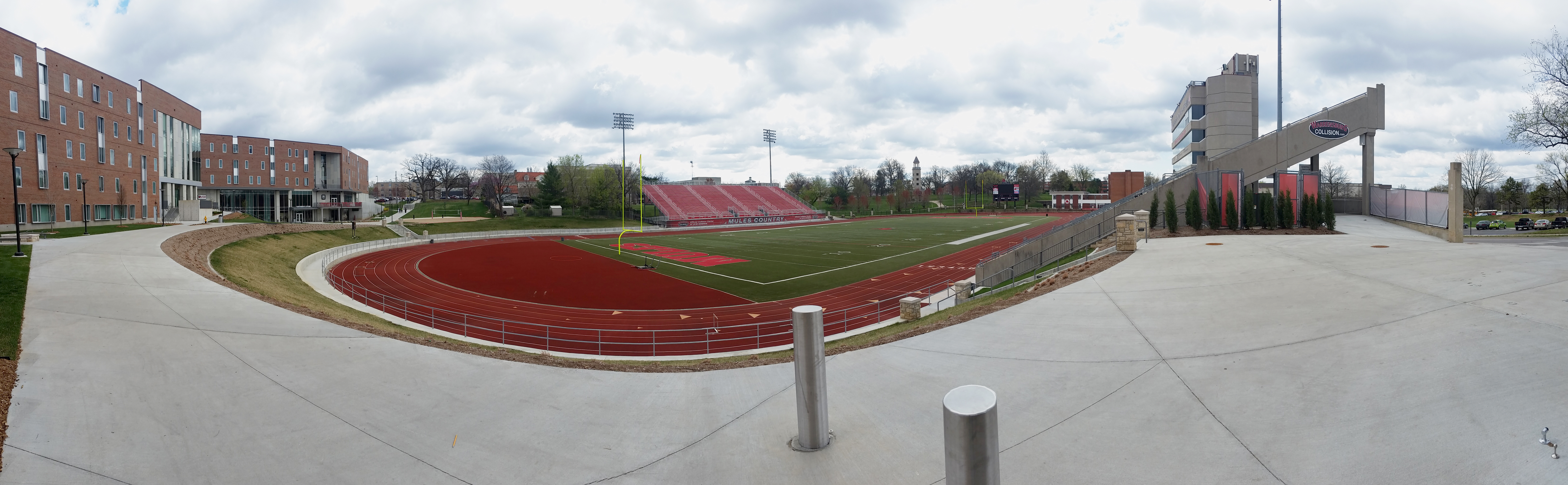
Audrey J. Walton Stadium overlooking the Northwest corner

It is named for Audrey J. Walton (wife of Walmart co-founder James "Bud" Walton) who donated $1 million in 1995 toward the building of a new 5,800 capacity grandstand to replace the original grandstand. The field is named Kennedy Field after Vern Kennedy, who was a baseball pitcher who attended Central. The stadium itself was referred to as Vernon Kennedy Field from 1954 until 1995.

The Central Missouri website says the first night college football game in Missouri occurred on October 11, 1929 in which the Mules lost 27-0 to Missouri Valley College.

The largest attendance at the stadium was on October 8, 2011, when 14,377 attended a game between Central and Northwest Missouri State University. It was the largest attendance at any MIAA facility. The previous record was another game between Central and Northwest on November 6, 2010 when 13,096 fans watched Northwest kick a last second field goal to defeat the Mules.
