= Bryan Nardo =

American football coach

Current position
- Title: Senior Defensive Assistant / OLBs & Nickels
- Team: Minnesota

Biographical details
- Education: Ohio (2008)

Coaching career (HC unless noted)
- 2004–2008: Ohio (SA)
- 2008–2010: Ohio (GA)
- 2011: Missouri S&T (STC/LB)
- 2012–2019: Emporia State (DC/LB)
- 2020–2021: Youngstown State (LB)
- 2022: Gannon (DC/LB)
- 2023–2024: Oklahoma State (DC)
- 2025: Charlotte (S)
- 2026–present: Minnesota (OLB/N)

Bryan Nardo is an American football coach who is currently the Senior Defensive Assistant at the University of Minnesota.

== Coaching career ==
=== Ohio ===
In 2004, Nardo got his first coaching job as a student assistant with the Ohio Bobcats. In 2008, after graduating from the University of Ohio, Nardo would become a graduate assistant for the Bobcats.

=== Missouri S&T ===
In 2011, Nardo was hired by Missouri S&T to be the team's special teams coordinator and linebackers coach. In his lone season with Missouri S&T he was named the Great Lakes Football Conference Assistant Coach of the Year.

=== Emporia State ===
In 2012, Nardo was hired by Emporia State to serve as the team's defensive coordinator.

=== Youngstown State ===
In 2020, Nardo would be hired by the Youngstown State Penguins as the team's linebackers coach. On December 15, 2021, Nardo was fired by Youngstown State.

=== Gannon ===
In 2022, Nardo was hired by Gannon to be the team's defensive coordinator. In his one season at Gannon, Nardo helped the team improve from allowing 393.3 yards per game in 2021, to just 287.4 yards per game in 2022.

=== Oklahoma State ===
For the 2023 season, Nardo was hired by Oklahoma State as the team's defensive coordinator. In his first season with the Cowboys in 2023, Nardo helped led them to the 2023 Big 12 Championship Game against Texas. Nardo was fired in 2024 after the Cowboys went 3-9, 0-9 in Big 12 play.

=== Charlotte ===
Nardo was named the safeties coach for the Charlotte 49ers on January 7, 2025.
