= Yager Stadium at Moore Bowl =

Stadium at Washburn University in Kansas, United States

Yager Stadium Moore Bowl
- Yager Stadium
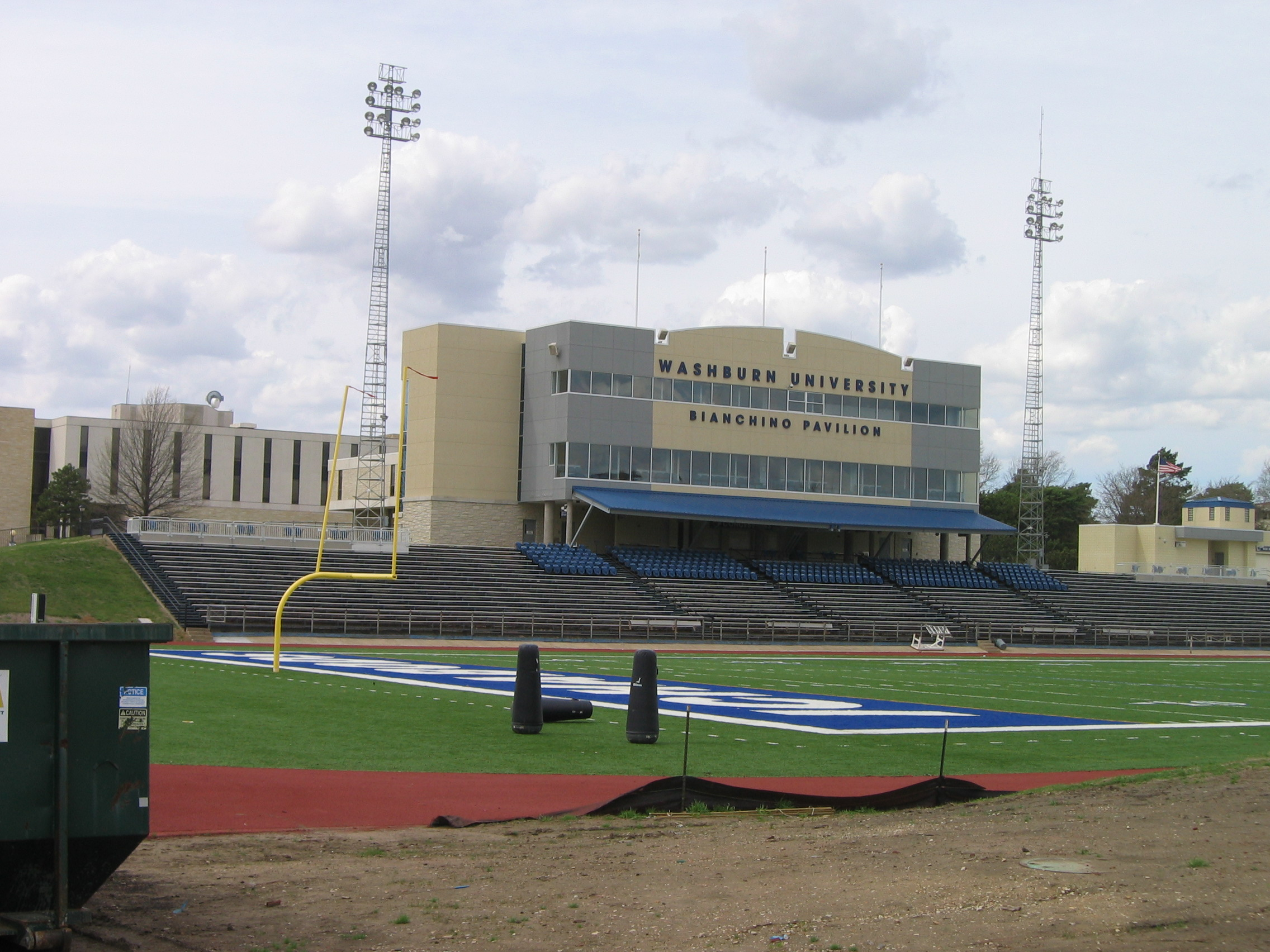
- Interactive map of Yager Stadium Moore Bowl
- Location: Topeka, Kansas
- Coordinates: 39°02′01″N 95°42′03″W
- Owner: Gary Wilson
- Operator: Washburn University
- Capacity: 7,200
- Surface: Sportexe artificial field turf surface

Construction
- Opened: September 28, 1928

Tenant
- Washburn Ichabods

Yager Stadium at Moore Bowl is a sport stadium in Topeka, Kansas. The facility is primarily used by Washburn University for college football and men's and women's soccer teams. The stadium currently hosts the Kansas State High School Activities Association Class 6A state championship game.

Previously just called the Moore Bowl, the stadium was re-dedicated in 2002 and named for former Washburn player Gary Yager at the request of an anonymous donor.
