= Chad Richison Stadium =

Football facility in Edmond, Oklahoma

Coordinates: 35.661576°N 97.4708°W

- Interactive map of Chad Richison Stadium
- Former names: Wantland Stadium (1965–2021)
- Location: Edmond, Oklahoma
- Owner: University of Central Oklahoma
- Operator: University of Central Oklahoma
- Capacity: 12,000
- Surface: Field Turf

Construction
- Opened: September 18, 1965
- Renovated: 2005, 2022
- Architect: CDFM2 (now 360 Architecture) for 2005 renovations

Tenants
- Central Oklahoma Bronchos (NCAA) (1965–present); Memorial Bulldogs (OSSAA) (1965– 2016); Santa Fe Wolves (OSSAA) (1993–2015); Ed. North Huskies (OSSAA) (1994–2016)

Chad Richison Stadium (formerly Wantland Stadium) is the on-campus football facility for the Central Oklahoma Bronchos football team in Edmond, Oklahoma. The official seating capacity of the stadium, following recent renovations, is 12,000, making the 7th largest Division II stadium, and the largest in the Mid-America Intercollegiate Athletics Association.

== History ==
The stadium opened in 1965, and was originally named Wantland Stadium after former Broncho head coach Charles W. Wantland. The Stadium also hosted the 1982 NAIA Championship Game. The Bronchos played against Mesa State. The Bronchos clinched their 2nd crown winning 14–11, in front of a national audience on the USA Network.

Artificial turf, new lighting and a new scoreboard were added to the facility in 2003. Chad Richison Stadium underwent a dramatic facelift in the summer of 2005 with the addition of a three-level press box that includes club seating and new stands on both sides of the field. In 2014 a new videoboard was installed.

Chad Richison Stadium was the home field for all three Edmond high school teams, Memorial, Santa Fe, and North. Edmond Public Schools leased the facility from UCO for $7,252 per game. As part of the lease EPS collected all revenue from ticket sales, and concessions. In February 2015, voters passed a $91 million bond issue which included expansion of a football field near Santa Fe High School. Later that year, Edmond Santa Fe opened their football stadium and the other EPS schools shifted their games to on-campus stadiums.

In 2017, the university began construction of a 45,000 square foot sports performance center located along the north end zone. The Sports Performance Center opened during the 2018 season.

During the 2021 season after a $10 million donation from Paycom CEO and former Broncho wrestler Chad Richison, the university renamed the structure Chad Richison Stadium.

== Structure and facilities ==
The stadium is a dual sided with a grass berm that imitates a horseshoe-shaped facility with its long axis oriented north/south, with the south end enclosed by grass and the north end bounded by the Sports Performance Center. Visitor seating is on the east sideline. The student seating sections are in Section 102 located in the west stands on the south side, next to the UCO Stampede of Sound which is near the south goal line. The Bronchos' bench is also located along the west side. The most recent renovation expanded the visitors grandstand and replaced a staircase behind the south end zone with a waterfall.

== Events ==
UCO has hosted the Oklahoma All-State Football Game in the facility six times since 1994. The stadium also hosts the annual UCO Stampede of Sound's Invitational Marching Band Contest. It also has hosted the class 6A Oklahoma Bandmaster's Association (OBA) Marching Contest several times. The stadium hosted a preseason Major League Soccer game in 2003 between the Kansas City Wizards and the Columbus Crew, and in 2004 between the Wizards and the Dallas Burn. In 2016, the stadium hosted the Oklahoma Secondary School Activities Association (OSSAA) Class 5A football championship game.

Since 2019, Chad Richison Stadium has been the host stadium for all the OSSAA 11 man football state championship games. The stadium is expected to host the games through the 2027 season.

== Attendance records ==
The following are the largest crowds for UCO football in the history of the stadium.

Rank	Date	Attendance	Opponent	Result
T–1	October 9, 1965	10,000	Southwestern Oklahoma State	W 34–13
T–1	September 29, 1973	10,000	Langston	L 3–27
3	October 4, 1975	9,500	Langston	W 22–6
4	October 28, 1978	9,200	Cameron	W 39–21
5	September. 15, 1979	9,000	Southwestern Oklahoma State	W 35–14
T–6	October 31, 1970	8,500	Oklahoma Panhandle State	W 35–14
T–6	October 18, 1975	8,500	Cameron	L 21–37
8	August 28, 2010	8,425	Pittsburg State	L 20–31
9	September 28, 1996	8,335	Langston	W 39–20
10	September 24, 1994	8,226	Langston	W 38–10
