= Lewis Field Stadium =

Sport stadium in Hays, Kansas

Coordinates: 38°51′59″N 99°20′21″W

Lewis Field
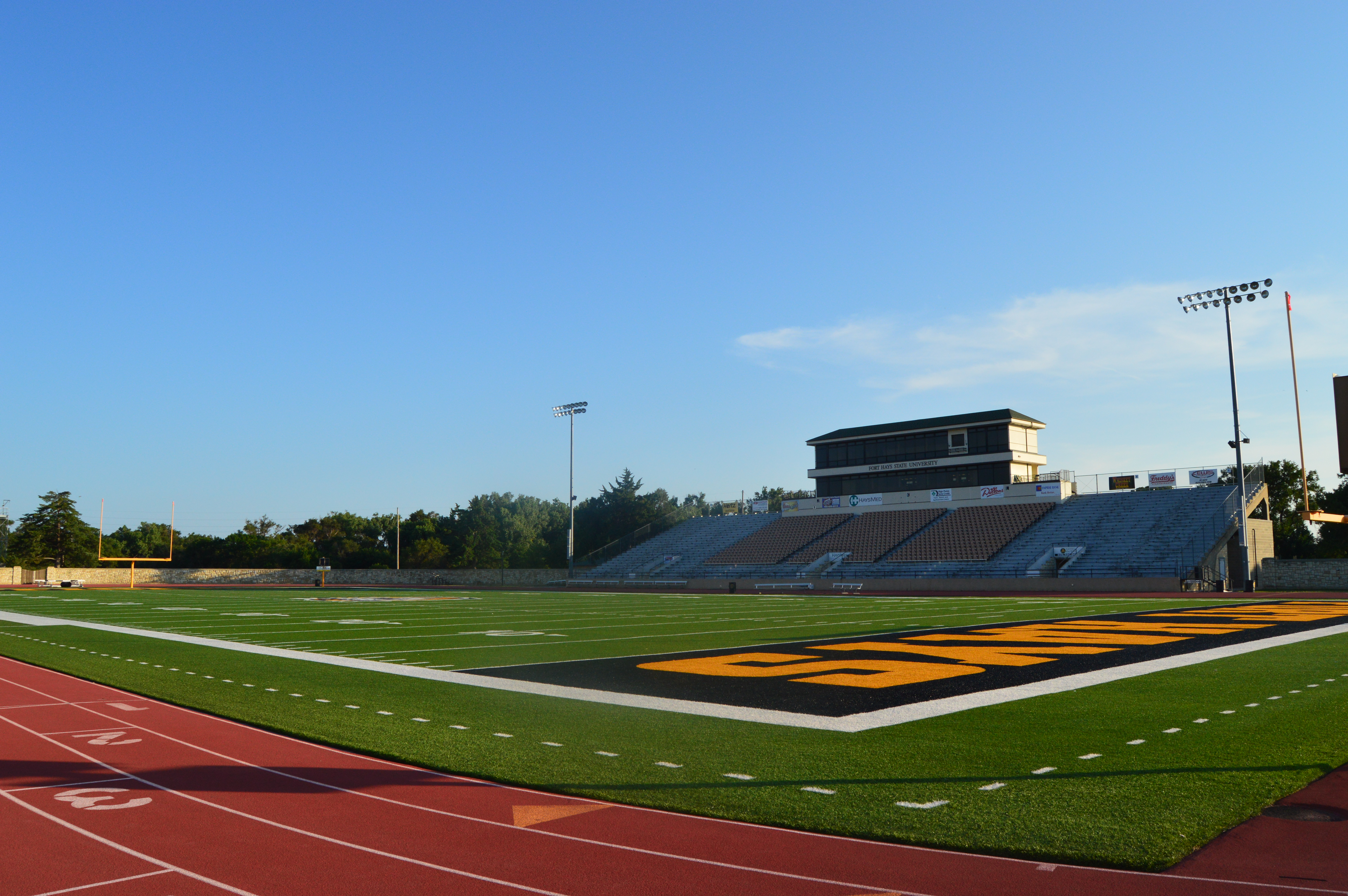
- Interactive map of Lewis Field
- Location: Hays, Kansas
- Owner: Fort Hays State University
- Operator: Fort Hays State University
- Capacity: 6,362
- Surface: Poligras

Construction
- Opened: 1936

Tenant
- Fort Hays Tigers

Lewis Field is a sport stadium in Hays, Kansas. The facility is primarily used by Fort Hays State University for college football team. The stadium is also the primary home field for Thomas More Prep-Marian, and formerly for Hays High School until the 2025 season when they opened their own stadium. It was named to honor William Alexander Lewis, president of Fort Hays State University from 1913 to 1933.
