= Francis G. Welch Stadium =

American sport stadium in Kansas

Coordinates: 38.417015°N 96.179642°W

- Welch Stadium
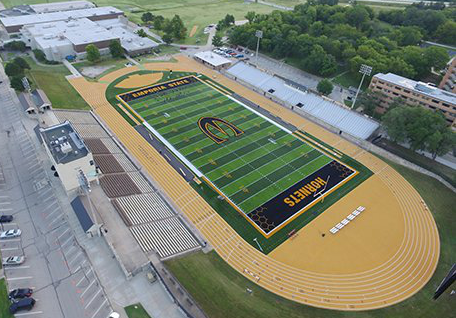
- Interactive map of Francis G. Welch Stadium
- Location: Emporia, Kansas
- Owner: Emporia State University
- Operator: Emporia State University
- Capacity: 7,000
- Surface: RamTurf

Construction
- Opened: 1937

Tenants
- Emporia State football Emporia High School football

Francis G. Welch Stadium, also known as Jones Field at Welch Stadium or Welch Stadium, is a sport stadium in Emporia, Kansas. The facility is primarily used by the Emporia State University football and track & field teams and Emporia High School football. It is named to honor long-time Emporia State coach and athletic director Fran Welch. The facility was one of the first on the NCAA Division II level to offer enclosed skyboxes and is still one of only a few across the nation.

== Stadium history ==
The first football game at Welch Stadium came on Armistice Day in 1937. The Hornets tied St. Benedict's College by a score of 20-20. More than 6,000 fans saw the first game in the facility. The largest crowd on record for a football game was the 1973 game against Northern Colorado. The record crowd of 10,000 saw the Hornets to a 10–0 victory as the Hornets vaulted to a No. 3 ranking in the NAIA.

=== Top crowds at Welch Stadium ===
Highest attendance at Welch Stadium
Rank	Attendance	Date	Game result
1	10,000	1973	Emporia State 10, Northern Colorado 0
2	9,200	1998	Emporia State 38, Pittsburg State 28
3	9,000	1969	Emporia State 34, Pittsburg State 21
4	8,064	1987	Emporia State 9, Pittsburg State 35
5	8,000	1926	Emporia State 6, College of Emporia 0
6	7,640	1992	Emporia State 38, Pittsburg State 49
7	7,305	2000	Emporia State 10, Fort Hays State 16
T-8	7,000	1979	Emporia State 4, Missouri Western 31
T-8	7,000	1980	Emporia State 7, Missouri Southern 14
Source: Emporia State Hornets Football Oct. 31, 2015 Game Notes

== Other uses ==
The stadium is used by the local high school for games, college and community events, Special Olympics and other sporting events. The stadium currently hosts the Kansas State High School Activities Association Class 5A state championship game, Emporia High School Football games and the Kansas Shrine Bowl all-star game every four years (the site currently rotates between Emporia, Pittsburg, Manhattan, and Hays).

Welch Stadium served three times as the site for the NCAA Division II Outdoor Track & Field Championships.
