= J. W. Jones =

President of Northwest Missouri State University
- In office 1945–1964
- Preceded by: Uel W. Lamkin
- Succeeded by: Robert P. Foster

John W. Jones (1894-1979) was president of Northwest Missouri State Teacher's College from 1945 to 1964. Jones was its first Ph.D president. He came to Northwest as dean of faculty in 1938.

During his presidency he oversaw a number of important building improvements and events:

== Structures ==
- Bearcat Arena opened in 1959
- Colden Hall
- Bearcat Stadium improvements
- J.W. Jones Student Union (dedicated in 1956)
- Expansion of seven dormitories
- Expansion of the Wells Library
- Expansion of the Industrial Arts Building
- DeLuce Fine Arts Building (under construction when he left office)
- Martin-Pederson Armory dedicated in 1955 by Harry S. Truman

== Events ==
- A gas tank by the Wabash Railroad tracks behind Residence Hall explodes injuring around 20 and killing Roberta Steel on August 28, 1951
- First graduate level courses in 1955
- Faculty rank system and tenure
- Renaming of the school to Northwest Missouri State College in 1955
- Statue of Abraham Lincoln in the Administration Building shot by a night watchman on May 17, 1959
- Horace Mann High School on the campus closed in 1960
- KDLX signed on the air in 1960
- Women's basketball reinstitute in 1962
- National Guard is called out during food riots in April 1964

Academic offices
Preceded by Uel W. Lamkin	President of the Northwest Missouri State University; 1945-1964	Succeeded by Robert P. Foster
