= JW Jones =

J.W. Jones or JW-Jones may refer to:

- J.W. Jones (1894–1979), former president of Northwest Missouri State Teacher's College
- JW-Jones (born 1980), Canadian blues guitarist, singer and songwriter
