= Bearcat Arena =

Multi-purpose arena in Maryville, Missouri

Coordinates: 40°21′01″N 94°53′05″W

Bearcat Arena is a 2,500 seat multi-purpose arena in Maryville, Missouri. It was completed in 1959 at a cost of $500,000 and renovated in 1993. It is the home of the Northwest Missouri State University basketball and volleyball teams.

Seating primarily consists of moveable bleachers for 1,200 on the east and west side which can retract flat against the walls. It has the second smallest capacity in the Mid-America Intercollegiate Athletics Association basketball arenas.

The Arena is in Lamkin Activity Center, a part of the Ryland Milner Complex and is sandwiched between Bearcat Stadium on the west and the Martindale Gymnasium on the east.

The Arena was originally called Lamkin Gymnasium (popularly called "Lamkin Gym") and was named for former school president Uel W. Lamkin.

Northwest first games were played in the Administration Building then in 1926 were played in what is now named 1,300 seat Martindale Gymnasium (named for Nell Martindale Kuchs, an early women's athletics faculty member). Martindale was used for women's sports and Lamkin for men's sports. The two structures were connected by a tunnel going to the pool in the lower level of Martindale.

In the 1993-94 academic year the Arena had $6 million renovation and enlargement which changed the front south facade and expanded it to the north (Northwest Student Recreation Center) which, houses a suspended jogging track, three basketball courts and five racquetball/handball courts. Changes on the south side included a new fitness center, lobby and weight-lifting, dressing rooms, coaches offices, and athletic training facilities.

The entire building was renamed the Uel W. Lamkin Activity Center with the basketball court area called Bearcat Arena. However, in common usage the whole building is now referred to as Bearcat Arena.
