= Dean L. Hubbard =

American academic administrator (1939–2025)

9th President of Northwest Missouri State University
- In office 1984–2009
- Preceded by: B.D. Owens
- Succeeded by: John Jasinski

Personal details
- Born: June 17, 1939
- Died: March 23, 2025 (aged 85) Kansas City, Missouri, U.S.
- Education: Andrews University; Yonsei University in Seoul, Korea; Ph.D. from Stanford University

Dean L. Hubbard (June 17, 1939 – March 23, 2025) was an American academic administrator, who was the president of Northwest Missouri State University from 1984 until 2009—the longest of any president in the school's history.

During Hubbard's tenure the school avoided an announced closing and created the first electronic campus in the United States. It also experienced success in sports, with Northwest appearing in six national title games and playing some games at Arrowhead Stadium in Kansas City. Before retiring in 2009 a program was started to replace students' printed textbooks with the electronic books or ebooks.

== Life and career ==
=== Before Northwest Missouri ===
Hubbard received bachelor's and master's degrees from Andrews University in Berrien Springs, Michigan. While living in South Korea from 1966 to 1971, he received a degree in Korean language from Yonsei University in Seoul. He then received a Ph.D. from Stanford University.

In 1972, he became a consultant at Union College in Nebraska. He rose to become chief academic officer and then the school's president in 1980.

=== Northwest Missouri ===
In 1984, he moved to Northwest where he launched his plan for a computer in every room to make the claim to be the first electronic public university campus in the United States by the time it was rolled out in 1987.

In 1988, Hubbard resolved a crisis when the Missouri Department of Education under John Ashcroft proposed closing Northwest and designating Missouri Western State University 40 miles south in St. Joseph, Missouri as the only state university in northwest Missouri.

Seeking to differentiate Northwest Missouri from Missouri Western, Hubbard launched a strategy emphasizing a culture of quality. Northwest Missouri State won Missouri Quality Awards—modeled on the Malcolm Baldrige National Quality Award, and currently administered by the Midwest Excellence Institute—in 1997, 2001, 2005, and 2008, the most of any organization in Missouri history.

==== Football powerhouse ====
The most visible differentiation was Hubbard's hiring of Mel Tjeerdsma in 1994 as head football coach for the Northwest Missouri Bearcats. Tjerdsma went 0–11 in his first season. In 1996, his team made the NCAA Division II playoff and won back-to-back championships in 1998 and 1999. It has appeared in the championship games in 2005, 2006, 2007 and 2008.

In 2000–2003, he oversaw the $5 million overhaul of Bearcat Stadium (renamed from Rickenbrode Stadium).

==== Attempt to rename the Administration Building ====
In 2009, students at the school actively sought to rename the school's landmark Administration Building the Dean L. Hubbard Administration Building. When the University Regents refused saying the building should not be named for anybody, the students sought unsuccessfully to oust the regents. Later the Student Senate in April 2009 voted 23–3 in a vote of no confidence in the Board and specifically asked for the removal of Bill Loch, President of the Regents.

=== After Northwest ===
In 2010, he was named interim president of St. Luke's College of Health Sciences in Kansas City, Missouri. He was formally named to the full position in March 2011. On March 23, 2025, Dean died from kidney disease in Kansas City, at the age of 85.

Academic offices
Preceded by B.D. Owens	President of the Northwest Missouri State University; 1984–2009	Succeeded by John Jasinski
