= Bearcat Stadium =

Football stadium in Maryville, Missouri

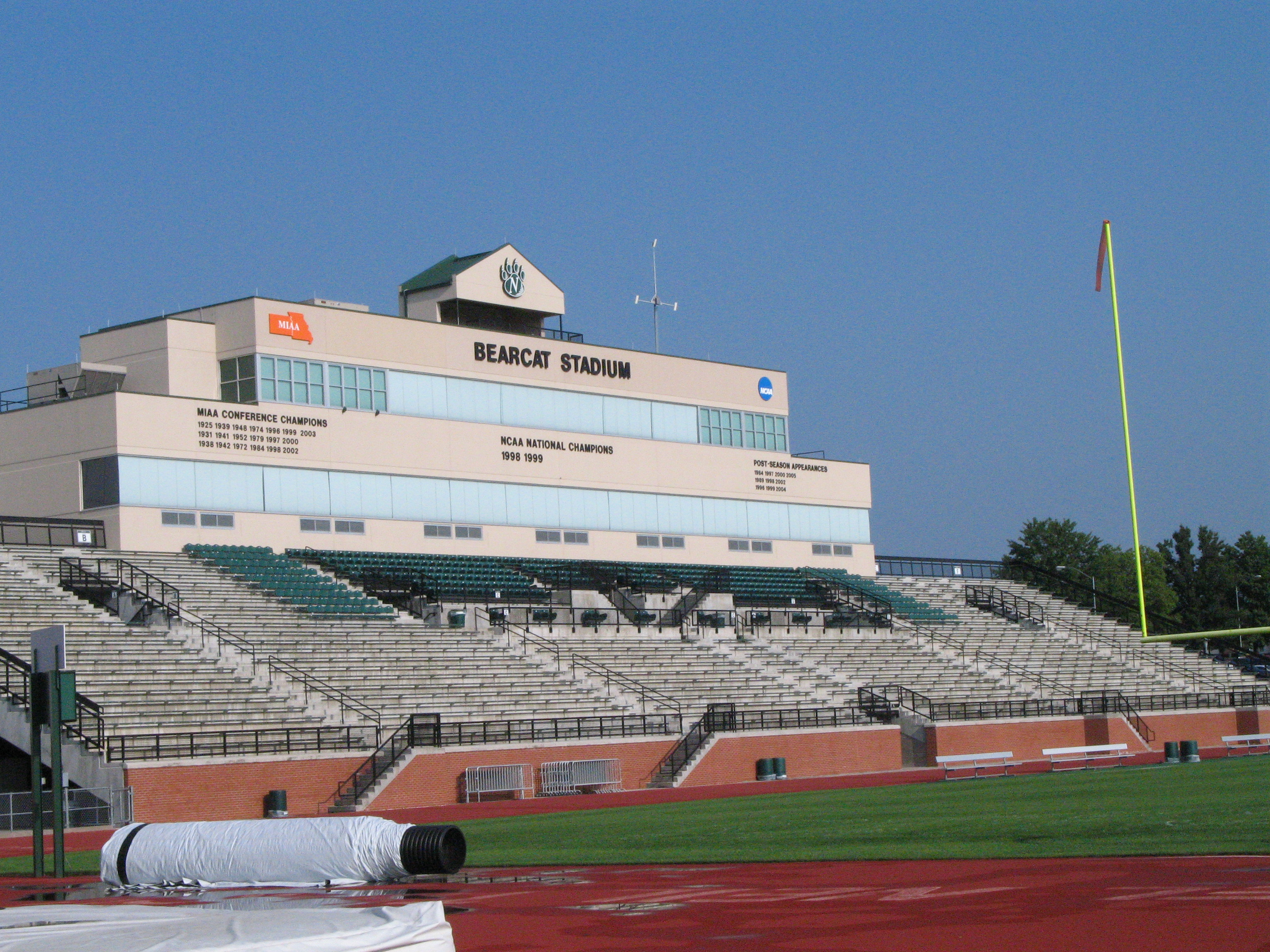
- Interactive map of Bearcat Stadium
- Former names: Memorial Stadium, Rickenbrode Stadium
- Location: Maryville, Missouri
- Coordinates: 40.3506°N 94.885612°W
- Owner: Northwest Missouri State University
- Operator: Northwest Missouri State University
- Capacity: 6,500
- Surface: Field Turf

Construction
- Opened: 1930
- Expanded: 2003

Tenant
- Northwest Missouri State University

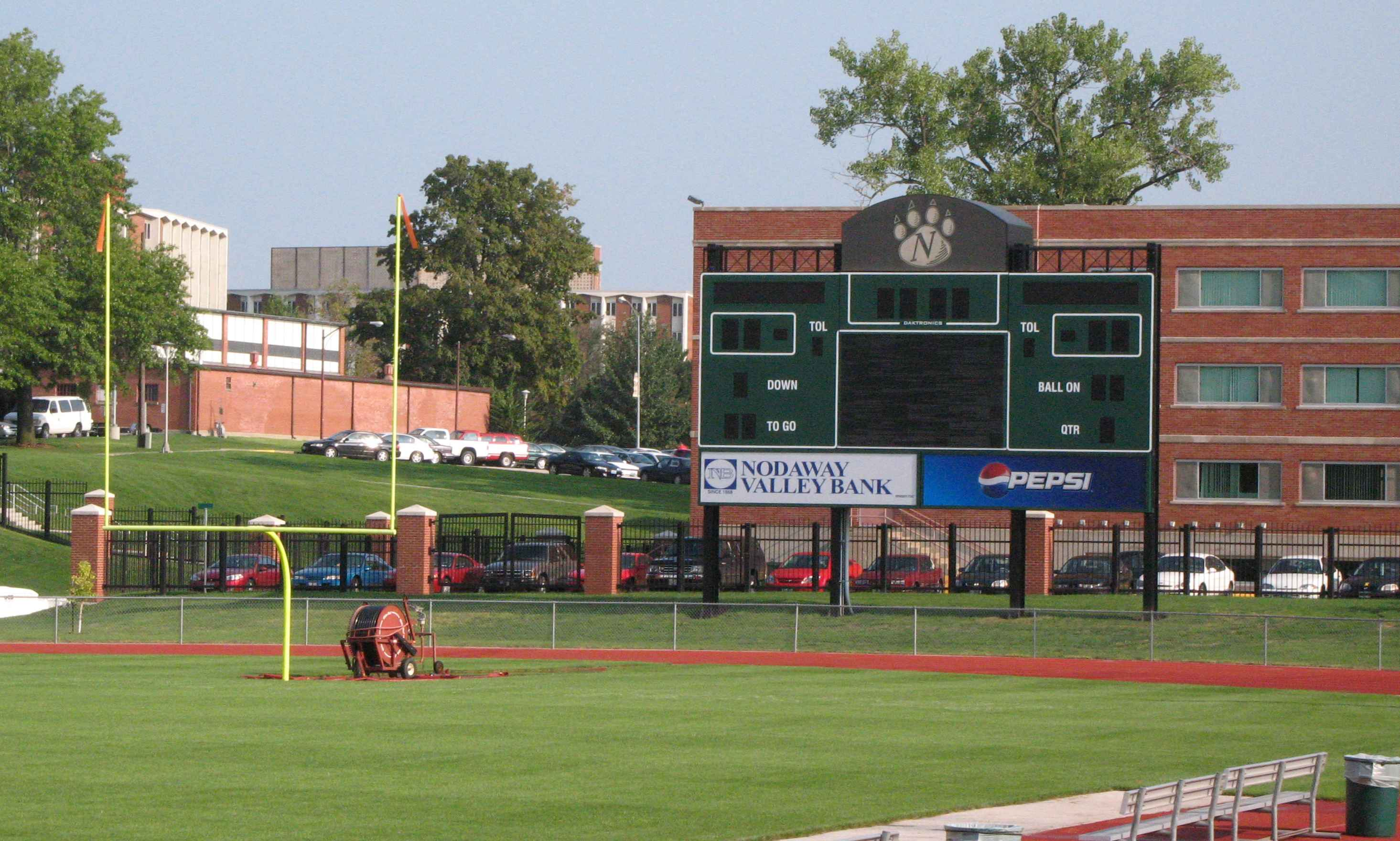

Bearcat Stadium (formerly Memorial Stadium and Rickenbrode Stadium) is the football stadium of the Northwest Missouri State University Bearcats in Maryville, Missouri and is the oldest continuous site for any NCAA Division II school.

It has a capacity of 6,500 and had lights and FieldTurf installed in the summer of 2007.

It is part of the Ryland Milner Complex which includes Bearcat Arena in the Uel W. Lamkin Activity Center (formerly "Lamkin Gym"), which is where the college basketball team plays, Martindale Gymnasium (the original school gymnasium), and the Robert P. Foster Aquatic Center. The field is surrounded by the Herschel Neil Track (named for a university student and rival of Jesse Owens who held several NCAA track records in the 1930s). The playing field itself is called Tjeerdsma Field in honor of the school's winning football coach Mel Tjeerdsma.

== History ==
The first game played at the stadium was Sept. 19, 1930. It was a night game and the first night football game at Northwest. It replaced a field on the north side of the college's Administration Building, which had begun operations in 1906. In 1949, it was named Memorial Stadium.

In 1961, it was named Rickenbrode Stadium for long-time university business manager and athletic booster William Rickenbrode. Through the 1970s, the stadium with lights was the home field for the Maryville High School Spoofhounds and was used as a venue for various civic functions, including the annual 4 July display.

In the 1970s, Northwest began construction of a new stadium on the west side of the campus. However, funds ran out as Northwest began competing for funding with the newly founded Missouri Western State University 40 miles south in St. Joseph, Missouri. In 1988, the State of Missouri, under Governor John Ashcroft, announced plans to close Northwest altogether. Following spirited opposition, the plans were reversed, and Northwest found itself forced to aggressively differentiate itself from its rival to survive.

In 1994, Mel Tjeerdsma, who had a stellar playoff coaching reputation from his jobs at Northwestern College (Iowa) and Austin College, started coaching at Northwest. The first season on the job, his team went 0-11.

In 1996, they made it to the NCAA Division II playoffs. However, due to poor conditions, they were unable to play the home games to which they were entitled.

In 1998 and 1999, Northwest won back-to-back Division II championships in games broadcast nationally on ESPN. Interest in the university immediately soared with the St. Louis Rams flying the team to a championship game, and the Bearcats playing one game a year at Arrowhead Stadium. Partially as a result, Missouri finally managed to finish the long-stalled plan to create a four-lane highway between St. Joseph and Maryville.

In 2000, the east visitor grandstand was completely rebuilt, funded by students of the university. Following the 2001 season, the west home grandstand was demolished (with temporary bleachers put in place for the 2002 season). In 2003, the stadium, with its new west grandstand with chairback and railback seating, was unveiled. During the renovation, the stadium lights were taken down (and would ultimately be put back up in 2007). The new stadium has 10 luxury boxes, and the scoreboard features video replay. The video board is one of the few that offer instant replay at the NCAA Division II level. The entire $5 million overhaul was privately paid for by alumni and boosters. The stadium was renamed Bearcat Stadium in 2004 to honor the contributions of the many individuals and organizations who worked in the fundraising efforts.

On December 9, 2006, the stadium hosted the first nationally televised home game in the school's and Mid-America Intercollegiate Athletics Association's history when Northwest defeated Bloomsburg University of Pennsylvania in the semifinals of NCAA Division II football. The game was broadcast on ESPNU, which brought in lights (previously used by Musco Lighting at Ohio Stadium during the Michigan - Ohio State game) to illuminate the field. It was the first night game at the stadium since 1977.

Bearcat Stadium during a Northwest Missouri State vs. Emporia State University football game on Oct. 31, 2026. Northwest Missouri won 59-14.

During the summer months of 2007, the natural turf was replaced by artificial turf and lights were added. The new field was dedicated on August 22, 2007 during a game against Arkansas Tech University, which had to be called after two delays with 2 minutes and 30 seconds remaining in the first quarter following a thunder and hail storm with Northwest leading 21-0 (it was later ruled a "no contest" by the NCAA). Tjeerdsma said afterwards:

I will remember this night for all the weird things that went with it

On December 8, 2007, it hosted its second nationally televised game (with its new lights supplemented by Musco Lighting) as it defeated Grand Valley State University to advance again to the Division II championship on ESPN2 with Gary Thorne as play-by-play and Bob Davie as color analyst. It hosted ESPN2 the following year when the Bearcats hosted the University of North Alabama and CBS College Sports in 2009 for the semifinal game against California University of Pennsylvania.
