= Hickory Stick =

American college football rivalry

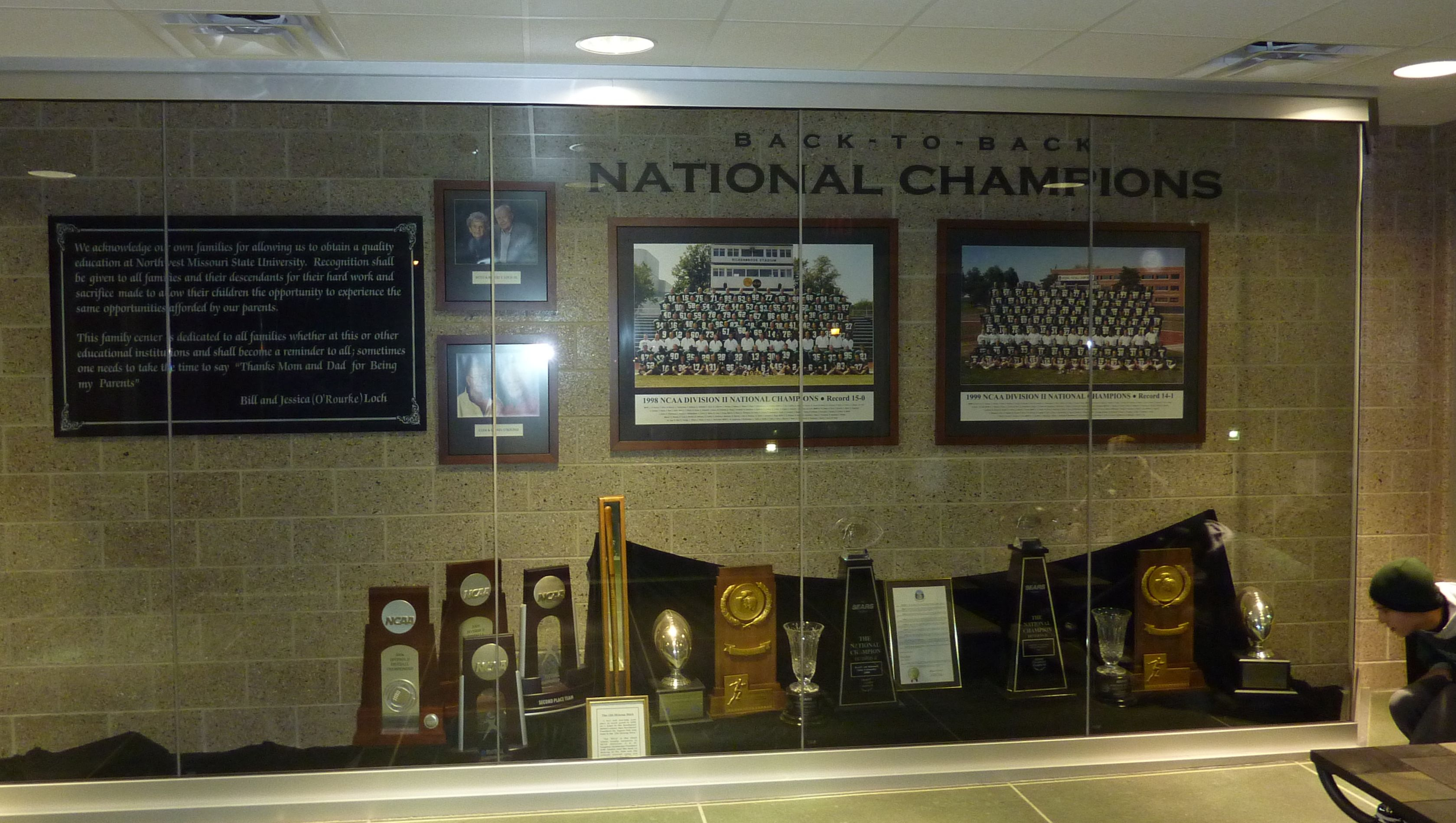

- Northwest Missouri Bearcats Truman Bulldogs
- Sport: Football
- First meeting: October 30, 1908; Truman 63, Northwest 0
- Latest meeting: September 2, 2011; Northwest 65, Truman 3
- Trophy: Hickory Stick

Statistics
- Total meetings: 91
- All-time series: Truman leads, 54–33–4
- Largest victory: Truman, 92–0 (1916)
- Longest win streak: Truman, 11 (1985–1995)
- Current win streak: Northwest, 10 (2002–2011)

Locations in Missouri

The Hickory Stick is a college football rivalry between NCAA Division II teams Northwest Missouri State University and Truman State University.

It is the oldest traveling trophy in Division II football. No games have been played since 2011, Truman having jumped to the Great Lakes Valley Conference in 2012.

The teams, which are founding members of the Mid-America Intercollegiate Athletics Association have been playing each other since 1908. With the expansion of the MIAA in 2012, teams in the league will play in divisions and the two schools are in different MIAA divisions. Consequently, starting in 2012 they would have played each other every other year.

== History ==
In 1930 Northwest President Uel W. Lamkin proposed the two schools play each other on Veterans Day. The award would be a polished hickory stick which had originally come from the Harrison County, Missouri farm where Northeast president Eugene Fair was born. Harrison County is in the district where students were supposed to go Northwest instead of Northeast.

The stick is two & a half feet long and tapers from a diameter of 1½” to about 1”. It was polished and lettered in the wood shop at Northwest. When it was created it had the scores from all the games since the two started playing in 1908 through 1930. The winner of the game dips the stick in the school color. The games were played on Veterans Day only in 1931–1933.

== Game results ==
At the conclusion of the September 2, 2011, game, Truman has the edge in the series 54–33–4.

Northwest Missouri State victories	Truman victories	Tie games

No.	Date	Location	Winner	Score
1	1908	Kirksville, MO	Truman	63–0
2	1916	Kirksville, MO	Truman	92–0
3	1917	Maryville, MO	Truman	35–0
4	1919	Kirksville, MO	Truman	87–0
5	1921	Maryville, MO	Truman	13–0
6	1922	Maryville, MO	Truman	18–0
7	1923	Maryville, MO	Northwest Missouri State	15–3
8	1924	Kirksville, MO	Truman	14–0
9	1925	Maryville, MO	Northwest Missouri State	12–3
10	1926	Kirksville, MO	Truman	50–7
11	1927	Maryville, MO	Truman	55–6
12	1928	Kirksville, MO	Truman	33–7
13	1929	Maryville, MO	Truman	7–6
14	1930	Kirksville, MO	Truman	20–7
15	1931	Maryville, MO	Northwest Missouri State	7–0
16	1932	Kirksville, MO	Truman	6–0
17	1933	Maryville, MO	Truman	19–0
18	1934	Kirksville, MO	Truman	36–0
19	1935	Maryville, MO	Truman	20–6
20	1936	Kirksville, MO	Truman	7–0
21	1937	Maryville, MO	Tie	0–0
22	1938	Kirksville, MO	Northwest Missouri State	26–7
23	1939	Maryville, MO	Northwest Missouri State	19–13
24	1940	Maryville, MO	Northwest Missouri State	20–0
25	1941	Maryville, MO	Tie	0–0
26	1946	Maryville, MO	Truman	12–6
27	1947	Kirksville, MO	Northwest Missouri State	22–6
28	1948	Maryville, MO	Northwest Missouri State	13–12
29	1949	Kirksville, MO	Northwest Missouri State	27–20
30	1950	Maryville, MO	Tie	13–13
31	1951	Kirksville, MO	Truman	13–12
32	1952	Maryville, MO	Northwest Missouri State	28–27
33	1953	Kirksville, MO	Truman	37–26
34	1954	Maryville, MO	Truman	24–20
35	1955	Kirksville, MO	Northwest Missouri State	6–2
36	1956	Maryville, MO	Truman	21–20
37	1957	Kirksville, MO	Truman	37–6
38	1958	Maryville, MO	Truman	20–19
39	1959	Kirksville, MO	Tie	12–12
40	1960	Maryville, MO	Truman	26–20
41	1961	Kirksville, MO	Truman	35–7
42	1962	Maryville, MO	Truman	43–7
43	1963	Kirksville, MO	Truman	22–7
44	1964	Maryville, MO	Truman	20–8
45	1965	Kirksville, MO	Truman	20–14
46	1966	Maryville, MO	Northwest Missouri State	24–21

No.	Date	Location	Winner	Score
47	1967	Kirksville, MO	Northwest Missouri State	13–7
48	1968	Maryville, MO	Truman	9–7
49	1969	Kirksville, MO	Truman	39–12
50	1970	Kirksville, MO	Truman	35–7
51	1971	Maryville, MO	Truman	16–3
52	1972	Kirksville, MO	Northwest Missouri State	10–0
53	1973	Maryville, MO	Northwest Missouri State	7–6
54	1974	Kirksville, MO	Northwest Missouri State	13–10
55	1975	Maryville, MO	Truman	20–0
56	1976	Kirksville, MO	Truman	42–10
57	1977	Maryville, MO	Truman	31–19
58	1978	Kirksville, MO	Truman	27–7
59	1979	Maryville, MO	Northwest Missouri State	13–9
60	1980	Kirksville, MO	Truman	14–10
61	1981	Maryville, MO	Truman	52–0
62	1982	Kirksville, MO	Truman	63–13
63	1983	Maryville, MO	Truman	27–21
64	1984	Kirksville, MO	Northwest Missouri State	42–20
65	1985	Maryville, MO	Truman	35–24
66	1986	Kirksville, MO	Truman	19–17
67	1987	Kirksville, MO	Truman	23–0
68	1988	Kirksville, MO	Truman	55–29
69	1989	Maryville, MO	Truman	16–13
70	1990	Kirksville, MO	Truman	34–31
71	1991	Maryville, MO	Truman	37–28
72	1992	Kirksville, MO	Truman	28–20
73	1993	Maryville, MO	Truman	38–16
74	1994	Kirksville, MO	Truman	37–10
75	1995	Maryville, MO	Truman	44–10
76	1996	Kirksville, MO	Northwest Missouri State	55–22
77	1997	Maryville, MO	Northwest Missouri State	34–10
78	1998	Kirksville, MO	Northwest Missouri State	41–7
79	1999	Maryville, MO	Northwest Missouri State	42–32
80	2000	Kirksville, MO	Northwest Missouri State	31–20
81	2001	Maryville, MO	Truman	24–23
82	2002	Kirksville, MO	Northwest Missouri State	31–24
83	2003	Maryville, MO	Northwest Missouri State	37–0
84	2004	Kirksville, MO	Northwest Missouri State	45–42
85	2005	Maryville, MO	Northwest Missouri State	17–0
86	2006	Kirksville, MO	Northwest Missouri State	31–10
87	2007	Maryville, MO	Northwest Missouri State	53–6
88	2008	Kirksville, MO	Northwest Missouri State	49–0
89	2009	Maryville, MO	Northwest Missouri State	70–0
90	2010	Kirksville, MO	Northwest Missouri State	44–10
91	2011	Kirksville, MO	Northwest Missouri State	65–3
Series: Truman leads 54–33–4
