= John Jasinski (academic administrator) =

Interim Provost for Missouri State University
- Assuming office July 1, 2022
- Succeeding: Frank Einhellig

10th President of Northwest Missouri State University
- In office July 1, 2009 – June 30, 2022
- Preceded by: Dean L. Hubbard
- Succeeded by: Clarence Green (interim)

John Jasinski (born 1962) is the interim provost for Missouri State University and was the 10th university president of Northwest Missouri State University.

== Early life ==
Jasinski was born in Flint, Michigan and was a 1980 graduate of Powers Catholic High School.

== Education ==
He received a bachelor's degree from Central Michigan University in 1985 with a major in Broadcast and Cinematic Arts/Public Communication and Masters from Central in 1986 in Interpersonal and Public Communication. He received a PhD from the University of Nebraska–Lincoln in 1996 in Educational Leadership and Higher Education Administration.

== Northwest Missouri (1986–2001) ==
From 1986 to 2001 he served various capacities at Northwest including Associate Provost, Chair, Department of Mass Communication. In 1994–95 he went on a Sabbatical to serve as Malcolm Baldrige National Quality Award Education Specialist. He has served part-time with the organization since then. Northwest has won more Missouri Quality Awards than any other organization (1997, 2001, 2005 & 2008)

== Maryville City Council and Northwood University ==
From 2001 to 2007 he was a member of the Maryville, Missouri City Council.

From 2001 onward he operated a consulting service focusing particularly on Malcolm Baldrige coaching.

From 2007 until 2009 he was executive vice president, chief academic and operating officer at Northwood University.
