= Ira Richardson =

American academic administrator

President of Adams State University
- In office 1925–1930
- Succeeded by: William Newson

President of the Northwest Missouri State University
- In office 1913–1921
- Preceded by: Henry Kirby Taylor
- Succeeded by: Uel W. Lamkin

Personal details
- Born: 1871
- Died: October 6, 1958 (aged 86–87)
- Education: Northwest Missouri State University; Central Methodist University

Ira Richardson (1871 – October 6, 1958) was a president of Northwest Missouri State University and founding president of Adams State College.

== Early life ==
Richardson was a native of northern Missouri and received a degree from Central Methodist University in 1897.

He received two master's degrees from Columbia University.

== Northwest Missouri ==
He was president at Northwest from 1913 to 1921.

Highlights of his time at the school:

- The school got its nickname of Bearcats in 1916
- The Tower yearbook first publication in 1917
- First degree class graduates in 1917
- Tornado hits the Administration building on March 15, 1919

== Adams State College ==
He served as Adams president from its founding in 1925 until 1950. Highlights of his stay:

- Richardson Hall (named for him was built)
- He was one of three faculty on the first semester in 1925
- Green and white were adopted as school colors in 1926
- Adams State Normal School name change Adams State Teachers College in 1930
- President's home and faculty apartments (Casa del Sol) constructed in 1929
- Casa Bonita and Kit Carson Hall dorms opened in 1936
- Rex Activity Center opened in 1939
- It began offering graduate classes in 1944
- When he retired enrollment was 349 in 1950.

Academic offices
| Preceded by Henry Kirby Taylor | President of the Northwest Missouri State University; 1913-1921 | Succeeded by Uel W. Lamkin |
