= Nell Martindale =

American physical educator

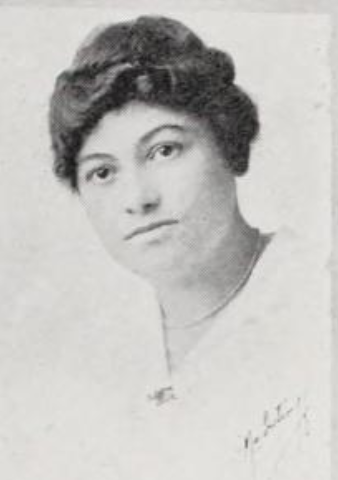
- Nell Martindale, from the 1917 yearbook of Northwestern State University
- Born: September 7, 1891; Missouri, U.S.
- Died: July 25, 1976 (age 84); Maryville, Missouri, U.S.
- Other names: Nell Martindale Kuchs
- Occupation(s): Physical educator, college professor

Nell Minnie Martindale Kuchs (September 7, 1891 – July 25, 1976) was an American physical educator. She was director of physical education for women at the University of North Dakota from 1917 to 1928. Martindale Hall at Northwest Missouri State University is named for her.

== Early life and education ==
Martindale was born in Missouri, the daughter of Edgar Martindale and Lydia Ann Heathman Martindale. Her mother was born in England. She graduated from the University of Kansas in 1912. At Kansas, she was a sports reporter for the campus newspaper. She earned a master's degree from Teachers College, Columbia University. She also studied at the Sargent School of Physical Education.

== Career ==
Martindale taught in a Kansas high school after college, and at Northwestern State University in Natchitoches, Louisiana, for the 1916–1917 academic year. She was Director of Physical Education for Women at the University of North Dakota from 1917 to 1928. Her position included directing the school's May Fete, an annual pageant which included casts of over 500 dancers and musicians, with titles such as "A Festival of Dionysus" (1919) and "The Wizard of Toyland" (1922).

In 1928, Martindale was briefly the acting director of physical education for women at Indiana University, before she joined the faculty of Northwest Missouri State Teachers College in the fall of that year. She continued directing dance festivals at Northwest Missouri State, until she left that job in 1935.

In 1961, Northwest Missouri State University named the women's gymnasium on campus after Martindale.

== Personal life and legacy ==
Martindale married George Albert Kuchs. Her husband died in 1966, and she died in 1976, at the age of 84, in Maryville, Missouri. The health sciences program at Northwest Missouri State University is housed in Martindale Hall, named in her honor.
