= B. D. Owens =

American University President (1977–1984)

President of Northwest Missouri State University
- In office 1977–1984
- Preceded by: Robert P. Foster
- Succeeded by: Dean L. Hubbard

Bobbie Dean Owens (also known as B. D. Owens) (born January 17, 1935) was a university president, serving as head of the University of Tampa, Northwest Missouri State University and St. Matthew's University.

== Early life ==
Owens is a 1959 graduate of Northwest Missouri (As of 2019 the only alumnus to become president). He received a PhD from the University of Pennsylvania. He taught at Bowling Green University. Working on an American Council on Education grant. He trained one year under President Elvis Stahr at the University of Indiana.

== University of Tampa ==
Owens was the youngest president of the University of Tampa when he was appointed in 1971. Adding to the celebrity expectations, journalist David Brinkley, then of NBC News, attended his inauguration in Oct. 2, 1972.

=== Closing the football program ===
Tampa had just attempted to elevate its program to championship level. Tampa Stadium, later home of the Tampa Bay Buccaneers, was then newly built. The team, in the preliminary stages of joining Division I, defeated the Miami Hurricanes in 1970 31–14, prompting the Hurricanes to hire away coach Fran Curci in 1971. The team was formally accepted into Division I in 1971. In 1972 the team beat Miami again 7-0 and won the Tangerine Bowl.

The 1973 NFL draft included team members John Matuszak, Paul Orndorff and Wilbur Grooms.

However, attendance did not pick up with the success. Owens reported that $755,000 from the university endowment had been spent on the program from 1972 to 1974 and that by spending at that rate the program would soon bankrupt the university. The Trustees cancelled the program at the end of the 1974 season. Reports at the time said Owens had to carry a weapon because of threats on his life following the program's termination.

=== Other accomplishments ===
In other developments, Owens launched an ROTC program in 1971 at a time when other schools were dropping them.

The school's landmark Plant Hall was placed on the National Register of Historic Places in 1972.

In 1972 the school launched a dual degree program with the Georgia Institute of Technology.

During Owens' tenure as president, the school acquired the former Florida State Fairgrounds, increasing the campus size to 48 acres (190,000 m^{2}) from 15 acres (61,000 m^{2})

In 1973 University began its first graduate program, the Master of Business Administration.

== Northwest Missouri ==
Owens became president of Northwest Missouri State in 1977. He instituted a recycling project where recycled material was burned to provide power for the school.

His most significant involvement was dealing with the fire at the school's Administration Building (July 24, 1979).

In the wake of the fire, the building was totally renovated except for the north wing which contained a theatre. The Mary Linn Theatre opened on the west side of the campus (with the music relocated from the Administration Building). The school's Wells Library was renovated to for academic offices and radio station KXCV that had been housed in the Administration Building. The B. D. Owens Library opened just northwest of the building.

Owens left the school in 1984.

== St. Matthew's University ==
After serving as a consultant to the Belize-based school, in 2001 he became interim president and Chief Financial Officer. Owens only briefly served as president as the school moved to the Cayman Islands.

== Personal life ==
He was married to Eleanor Sue Owens (née Wright) in 1957, until her death in 2026. He has two sons, and currently lives in West Des Moines, Iowa.

Academic offices
| Preceded by Robert P. Foster | President of the Northwest Missouri State University; 1977–1984 | Succeeded by Dean L. Hubbard |
