= Truman State University =

Public university in Kirksville, Missouri, US

Coordinates: 40.18917°N 92.58239°W

- Former names: North Missouri Normal and Commercial School (1867–1868); North Missouri Normal School (1868–1870); First District Normal School (1870–1918); Northeast Missouri State Teachers College (1918–1968); Northeast Missouri State College (1968–1972); Northeast Missouri State University (1972–1996)
- Type: Public liberal arts university
- Established: September 2, 1867; 159 years ago
- Endowment: $67.9 million (2021)
- President: Susan L. Thomas
- Provost: Tim Walston
- Academic staff: 269 (full time, 2021)
- Students: 3,636
- Undergraduates: 3,302
- Postgraduates: 334
- Location: Kirksville, Missouri, United States
- Campus: Town, 210 acres (0.3 sq mi; 85.0 ha)
- Colors: Purple & white
- Nickname: Bulldogs
- Sporting affiliations: NCAA Division II – GLVC
- Mascot: Spike
- Website: truman.edu
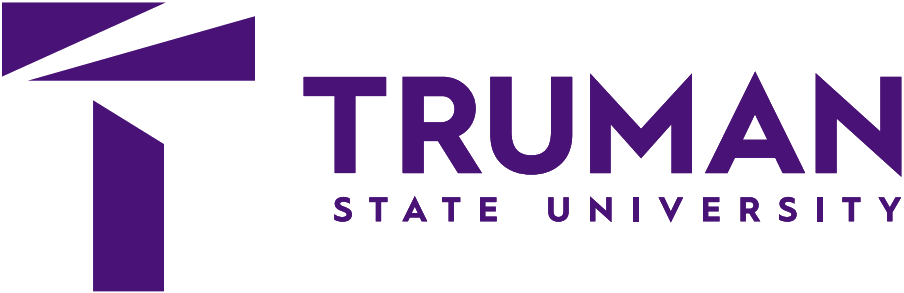

Truman State University (TSU or Truman) is a public liberal arts university in Kirksville, Missouri, United States. It had 3,664 enrolled students in the fall of 2024 pursuing degrees in 61 undergraduate and 13 graduate programs.

The university is named for U.S. President Harry Truman, who was a Missouri native. From 1972 until 1996, the school was known as Northeast Missouri State University.

== History ==
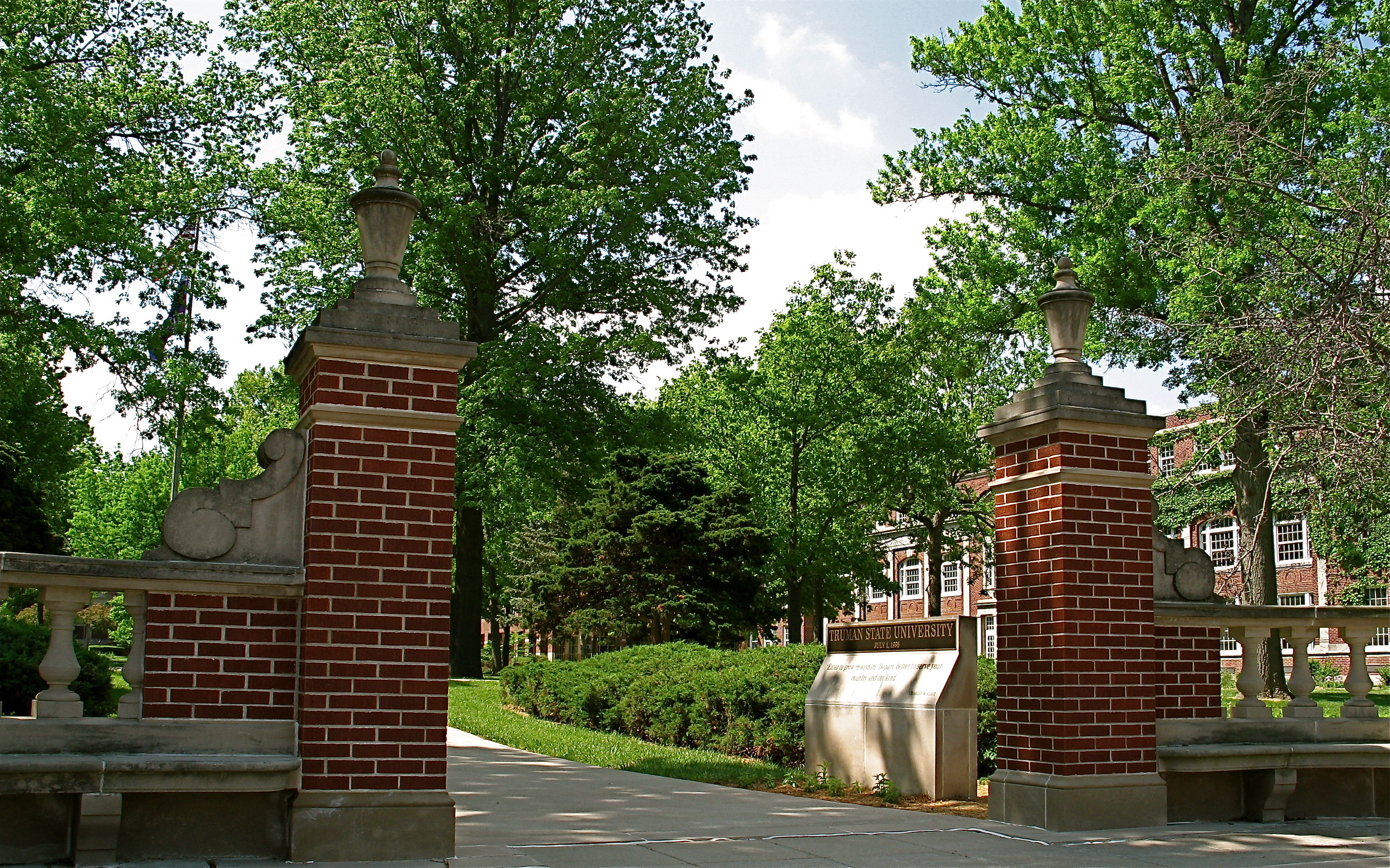
Entrance on East Normal Avenue

Truman State University was founded in 1867 by Joseph Baldwin as the "North Missouri Normal School and Commercial College." Baldwin was a pioneer in education, and his school quickly gained official recognition in 1870 by the Missouri General Assembly, which designated it as the "First District Normal School," the first public teachers' college in Missouri.

The school served a district comprising 26 counties: including Adair, Audrain, Boone, Callaway, Chariton, Clark, Howard, Knox, Lewis, Lincoln, Linn, Marion, Macon, Monroe, Montgomery, Pike, Putnam, Ralls, Randolph, St. Charles, Schuyler, Scotland, Shelby, Sullivan, and Warren.

Purple and white were adopted as the school's official colors after Basil Brewer wrote a school song entitled "The Purple and the White." They have remained as the school colors since.

In 1919, the school was renamed "Northeast Missouri State Teachers College." For the next four decades, it was commonly called "Kirksville State."

In 1924, a fire destroyed Baldwin Hall and the college's library. In an attempt to extinguish the fire, the lake (which can be seen in photographs of the campus from before 1924) that was then in the middle of the campus was pumped dry. The area where the lake once stood is now the campus's quadrangle, known as the "Quad," which serves as a gathering place for students to study, socialize with one another, and attend events such as concerts and fairs.

First president Joseph Baldwin statue on campus

In the first half of the 20th century, the school's mission broadened. By the 1960s, the college was no longer simply a teacher-training school. Reflecting this, it was renamed "Northeast Missouri State College" in 1968.

Only four years later, in 1972, it was renamed Northeast Missouri State University (NMSU). On June 20, 1985, Governor John Ashcroft signed legislation designating the university as Missouri's only statewide public liberal arts and sciences university. This changed the school's focus from regional to statewide. As such, nearly 100 programs were dropped in six years, including all two-year programs that did not fulfill the liberal arts mission.

Coinciding with the tenth anniversary of the university's mission change, Governor Mel Carnahan signed legislation changing its name to "Truman State University". The new name became official on July 1, 1996, and the university remains designated by statute as Missouri's public liberal arts and sciences institution.

In the 2024, U.S. News & World Report placed Truman fifth among Midwest Regional Universities, while Washington Monthly placed Truman No. 12 among master's universities nationwide.

=== Presidents ===
Years	Name
1867–68	North Missouri Normal and Commercial School
1868–70	North Missouri Normal School
1870–1918	First District Normal School
1918–68	Northeast Missouri State Teachers College (Commonly called Kirksville State Teachers College)
1968–72	Northeast Missouri State College
1972–96	Northeast Missouri State University
1996–present	Truman State University

== Board of governors ==
Truman's board of governors consists of ten members. Each member is appointed by the governor of Missouri to serve a four-year term, with a student representative serving for two years. The ten members must meet residential requirements defined by Missouri law. The board of governors also includes four committees: the Finance and Audit Committee, the Budget and Capital Projects Committee, the Honorary Degrees Committee, and the Truman State University Foundation Board of Directors.

== Campus ==
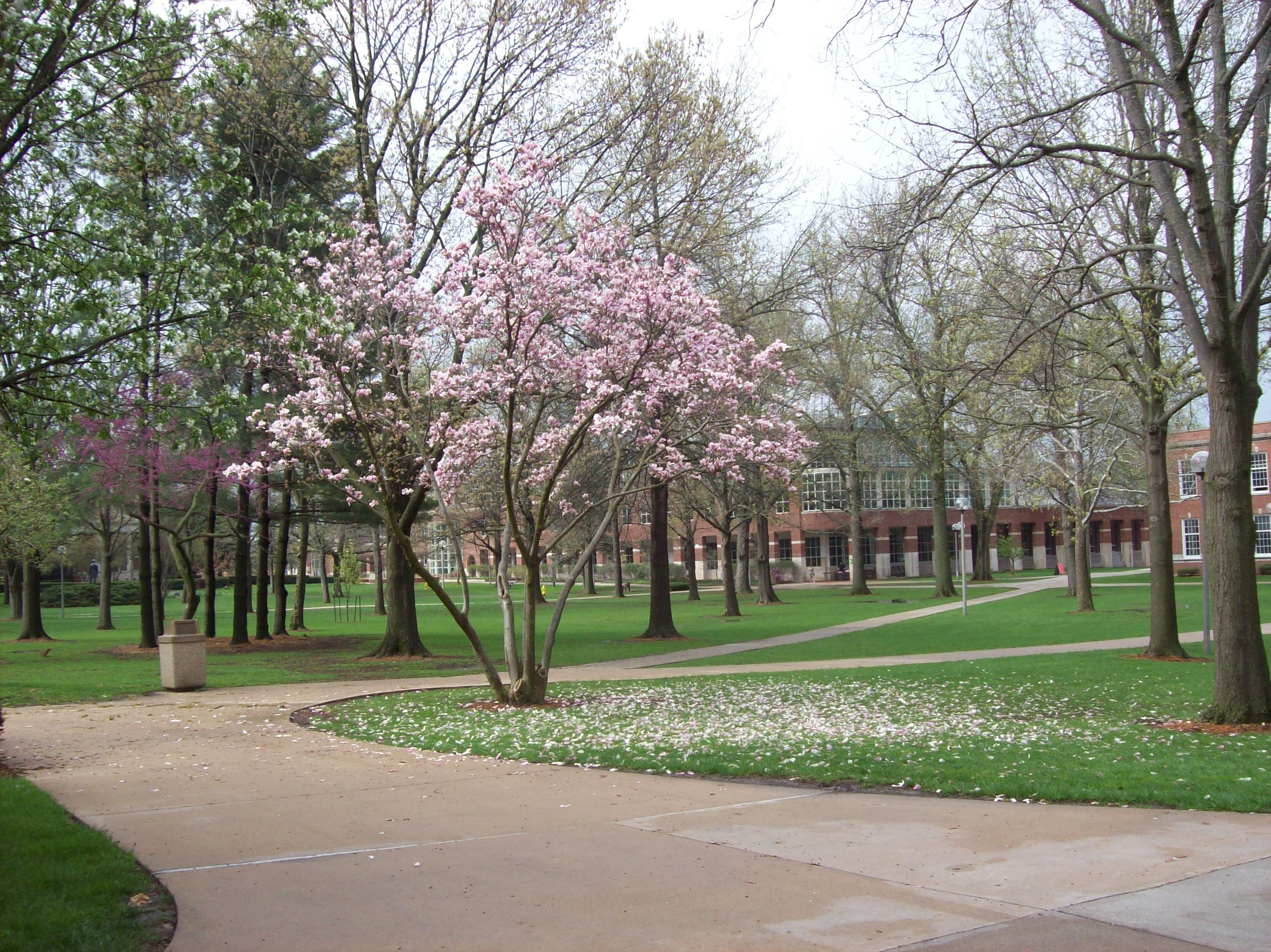
The quad in spring

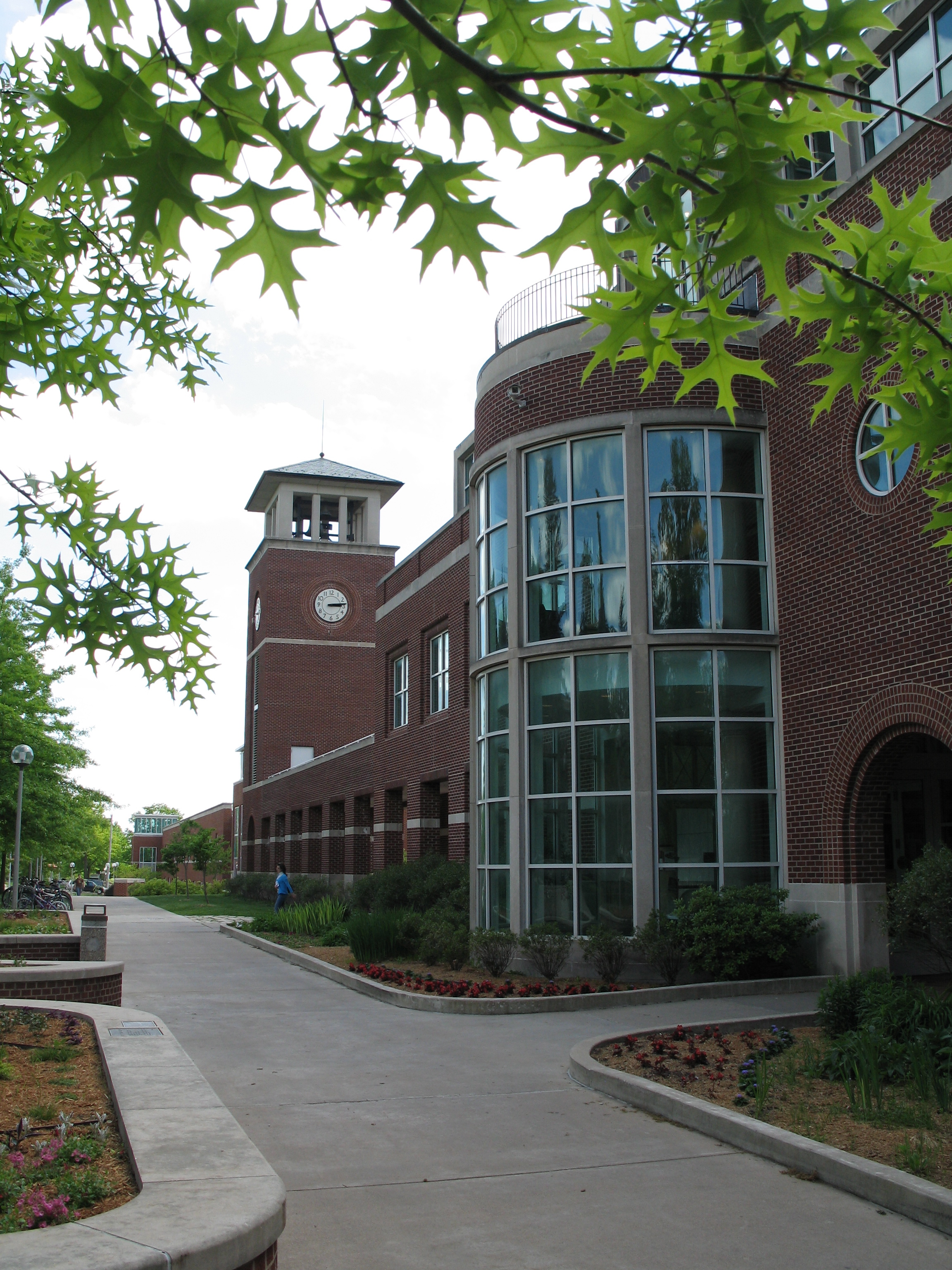
"The Bubble" of the Pickler Memorial Library

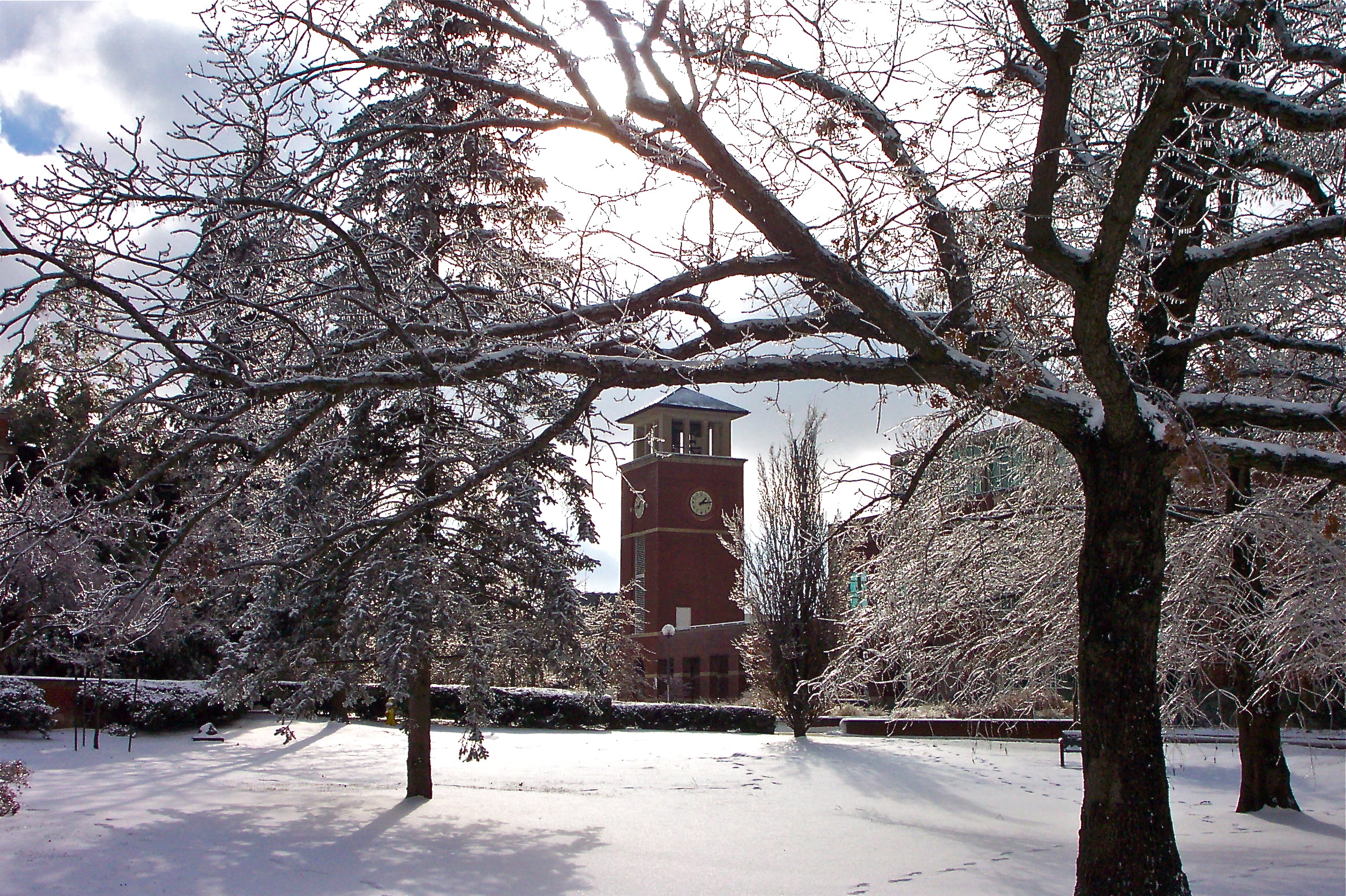
Bell Tower from across the quad in winter

The campus is located on the south side of Kirksville. Truman's main campus is situated around a slightly wooded quadrangle, also known as the "Quad." It is two blocks south of the town square, which includes an eight-screen movie theatre and various eateries and shops.

Notable buildings on campus include Pickler Memorial Library, the Kirk Memorial, the Kirk Building, Magruder Hall, McClain Hall, Baldwin Hall, Violette Hall, Barnett Hall, Ophelia Parrish, Pershing Arena, the Student Union Building and the Recreation Center ("The Rec"). The oldest building is not Kirk Building, but is instead the purple-doored Physical Plant building located between Violette Hall and the Kirk Memorial.

Pickler Memorial Library was named after Samuel M. Pickler, who donated funds to rebuild the library after it was destroyed by fire in 1924. Renovated in 1993, it now houses the main computer lab, as well as approximately 500,000 volumes of various works. The front lobby area of Pickler Memorial Library is known as "the Bubble" for its curved glass atrium.

Kirk Memorial is a small, domed structure near the center of campus. The structure is dedicated to John Kirk, the fifth president of the university. It is mainly used for special events.

The Kirk Building was once the university's combined gymnasium and auditorium facility. Following extensive renovations, it now houses the university's student services, including the Student Health Center, Writing Center, and Career Center.

The Rec is located north of Centennial Hall. It also offers a gymnasium for a variety of sports, a weight room, an elevated track, various exercise equipment, and a small multipurpose gym for hockey, indoor soccer, and other indoor sports.

There are seven main academic buildings. Magruder Hall is the science building and houses the departments of Chemistry, Physics, Biology, and Agriculture. McClain Hall serves as both an administrative and academic building, housing studies in Classical & Modern Languages, Economics, English & Linguistics, History, Philosophy & Religion, and Political Science can be found there. Baldwin Hall is connected to McClain Hall and houses the campus auditorium that is best known for hosting cultural events through the Kohlenberg-Lyceum Series. Violette Hall, named after former history professor E.M. Violette, is home to the School of Business, the Mathematics and Computer Science Department, and the Education Department. Ophelia Parrish (OP) is home to the Art, Music, and Theatre Departments; it is named after Ophelia Parrish (1850-1915), the college's first librarian. Barnett Hall is home to the departments of Anthropology, Geography, and Sociology; Communication; Justice Systems; Psychology; ROTC; and Nursing programs. The Pershing Building, also home to the basketball team's Pershing Arena, houses the Departments of Health and Exercise Science and Communication Disorders.

== Academics ==
=== Admissions ===
Freshman admission to the university is based upon a holistic review of a candidate's academic record. Basic requirements are high school performance and they are now fully test-optional. Admissions decisions are also based on a mandatory application essay, the applicant's resume including special abilities and talents, and the applicant's high school and extracurricular record. All applicants must have four credits of English, three credits of math, three credits of science, two credits of foreign language, two credits of social studies, and one credit of fine art. According to the Princeton Review, Truman has a selectivity rating of 84 out of 99, with an 80% acceptance rate. In 2023, Truman had an 83.5% freshman retention rate and a 57% four year graduation rate, with 40.1% male, 59.9% female, 64.3% residents of Missouri, 11.0% minority, and 7.2% non-resident aliens. For 2024, admitted freshman students had an average 3.76 high school GPA. The university does not require submission of standardized test scores, as it is a test-optional school. Those accepted that submitted test scores had an average 1070-1330 SAT score (10% submitting scores) or average 23-29 ACT score (77% submitting scores).

=== Rankings ===
Academic rankings

Master's
- Washington Monthly: 6

Regional
- U.S. News & World Report: 5

National
- Forbes: 251
- WSJ/College Pulse: 501-600

In addition to the "Academic rankings" listed to the right, for 2025, U.S. News & World Report ranked Truman #1 in Top Public Schools, and #11 in Best Value Schools, of all Regional Universities Midwest. Truman has a 12:1 student/faculty ratio and 67% of classes have fewer than 20 students.

=== The Liberal Studies program ===
On July 20, 1985, the state of Missouri charged Truman State University with serving as the state's public liberal arts and sciences university. To meet this commitment to the people of Missouri, the Truman faculty and administration created the Liberal Studies Program, the general education curriculum undergraduates complete to receive a Truman degree.

=== Schools ===
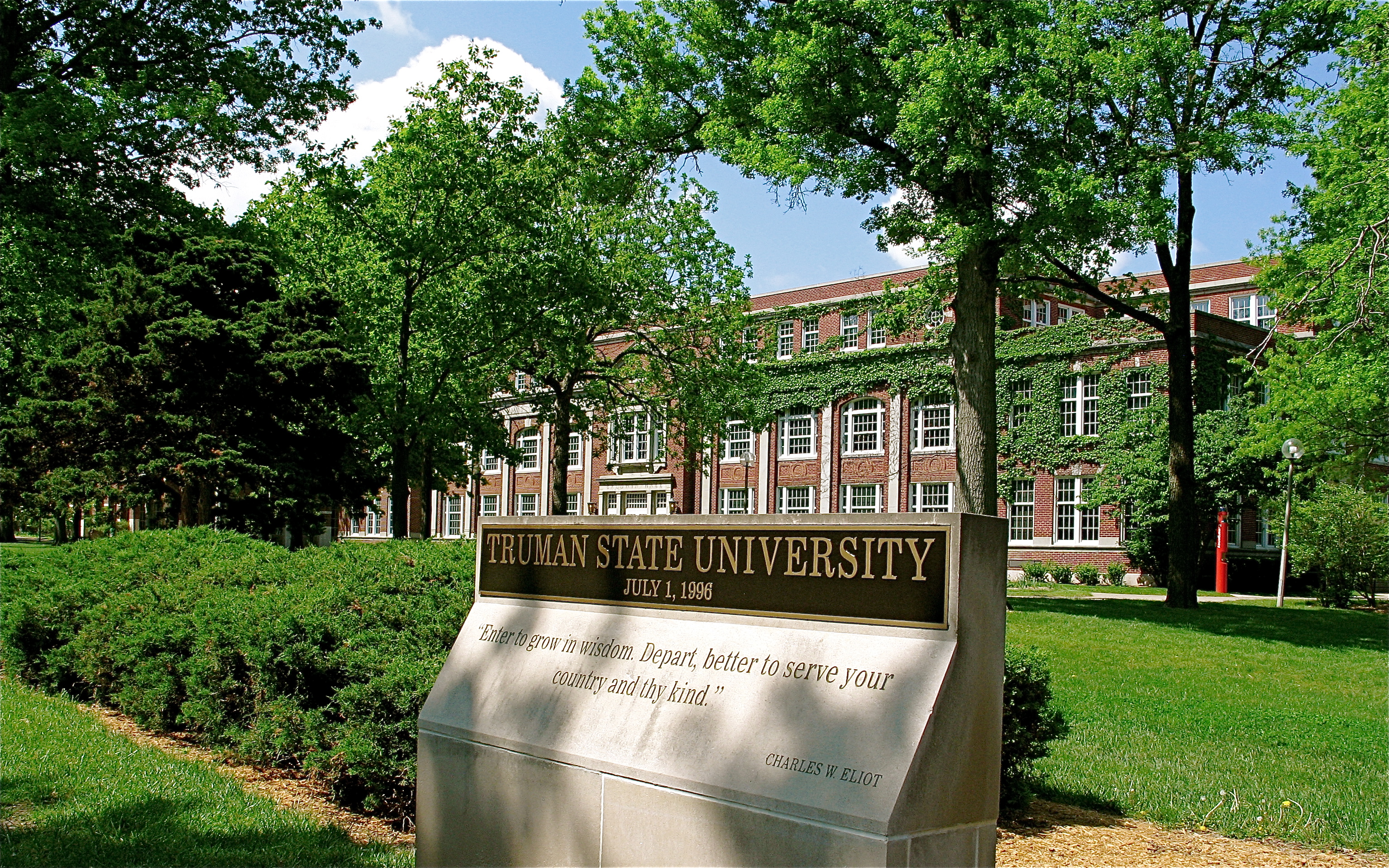
Truman State University entrance

The academic programs at Truman State University are organized within three schools: Arts and Humanities, Science and Mathematics, and Business and Professional Studies.

The School of Arts and Humanities is the home of the departments of Art and Design, Communication and Theatre Arts, English, Languages and Linguistics, Music, and Social Sciences and Human Inquiry. The School offers degrees in Art, Classics, Communication, Creative Writing, Criminal Justice Studies, English, History, Linguistics, Modern Language, Music, Philosophy and Religion, Political Science and International Relations, Sociology and Anthropology, and Theatre.

The School of Science and Mathematics includes the departments of Agricultural and Biological Sciences, Computer and Data Sciences, Health Science, Mathematics, and Physical Sciences. The School offers degrees in Agricultural Science, Biochemistry and Molecular Biology, Biology, Chemistry, Computer Science, Data Science, Health Science, Mathematics, Physics, and Statistics. The school also offers Missouri's only undergraduate interdisciplinary degree program in mathematical biology which has connections and resources available through the Intercollegiate Biomathematics Alliance. The school also coordinates the Missouri Pre-STEM Pathways Program with Moberly Area Community College, Metropolitan Community College, and St. Charles Community College.

The School of Business and Professional Studies houses the departments of Business and Economics, Communication Disorders, Education, Exercise Science, Military Science, Nursing, and Psychology and Counseling. The School offers degrees in Business Administration (BA or BS) with an emphasis in Finance, Management, Marketing, and International Business (BA only). In addition, a BS and MAcc in Accounting are offered, with the graduate program ranked third in the nation in terms of CPA passage rates. The Business program is AACSB accredited. The School also offers degrees in Athletic Training (graduate), Communication Disorders (graduate and undergraduate), Counseling (graduate), Disability Studies: Applied Behavior Analysis (graduate), Economics, Education (MAE only), Exercise Science, Nursing, and Psychology, and a minor in Military Science.

Students are also free to create their interdisciplinary majors or to minor in any of the approved interdisciplinary minors, which include African and African Diaspora Studies, Asian and Asian American Studies, Classical Studies, Cognitive Science, Disability Studies, Environmental Studies, Folklore, Forensic Science, International Studies, Italian Studies, Mathematical Biology, Medieval and Early Modern Studies and Women's and Gender Studies.

== Campus life ==
Undergraduate demographics as of fall 2023
Race and ethnicity	Total
White	79%
International student	9%
Hispanic	3%
Two or more races	3%
Asian	2%
Black	2%
Unknown	1%
Economic diversity
Low-income (Note: The percentage of students who received an income-based federal Pell grant intended for low-income students.)	19%
Affluent (Note: The percentage of students who are a part of the American middle class at the bare minimum.)	81%

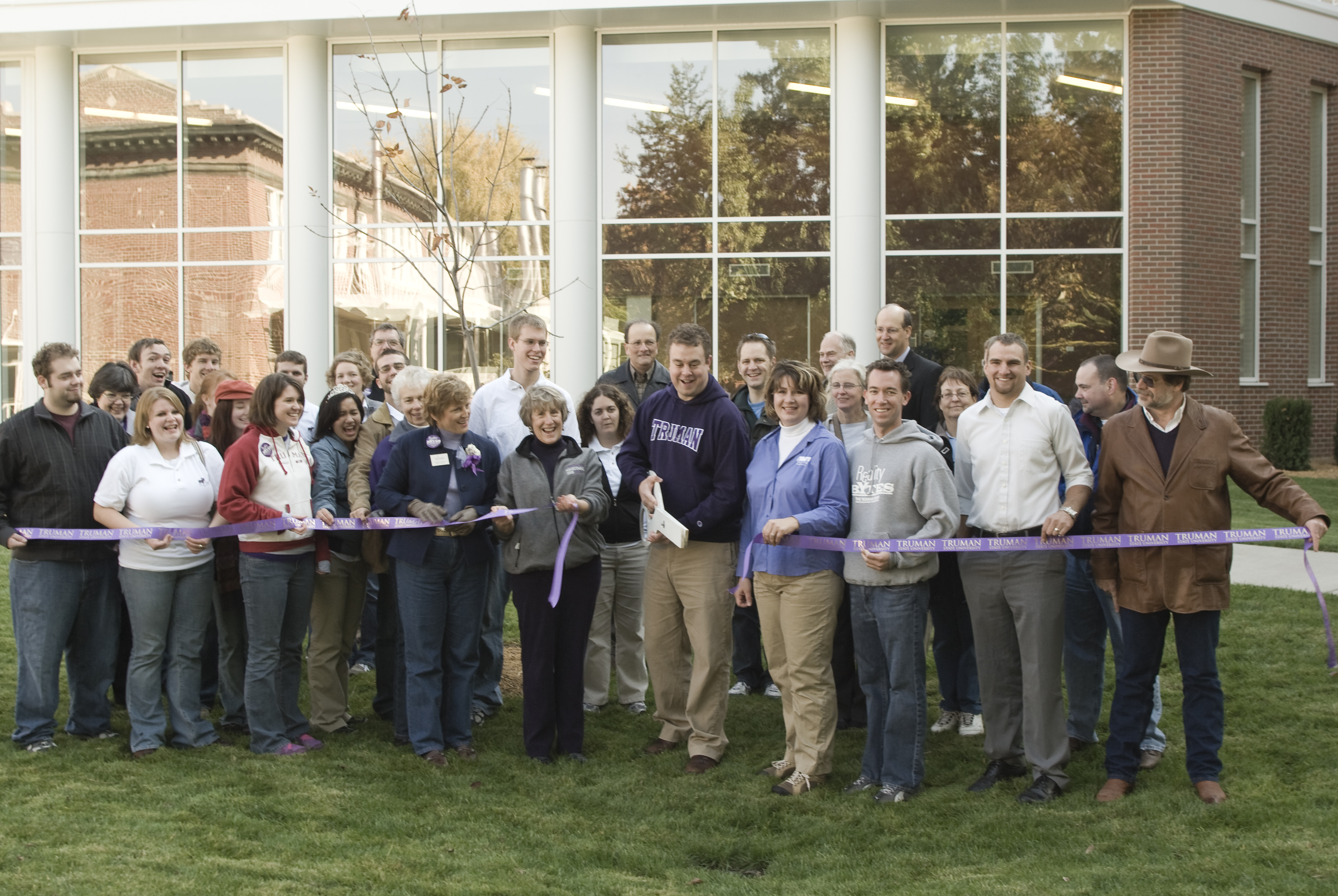
Then-Missouri Hall Director Zac Burden cuts the ribbon at the ceremony honoring the building's completed renovation in 2007.

=== Student organizations ===
Truman offers approximately 250 different student organizations, including a chapter of Phi Beta Kappa.

An organization that has garnered considerable attention since its inception is the Bulldog Student Investment Fund, a group in which student analysts invest a portion of the university's endowment in public equities to outperform the market. The organization hopes to eventually use the proceeds from the fund's returns to sponsor scholarships for Truman students. In 2015, members from the Bulldog Student Investment Fund, representing Truman State, achieved the first place prize among the five competing universities in the St. Louis CFA Institute Challenge and went on to compete at nationals. In 2017, members from the Bulldog Student Investment Fund repeated this achievement.

==== Greek life ====
Approximately 20% of the student body is affiliated with a social Greek organization. Truman hosts six sororities and ten fraternities.

=== Campus lore and traditions ===
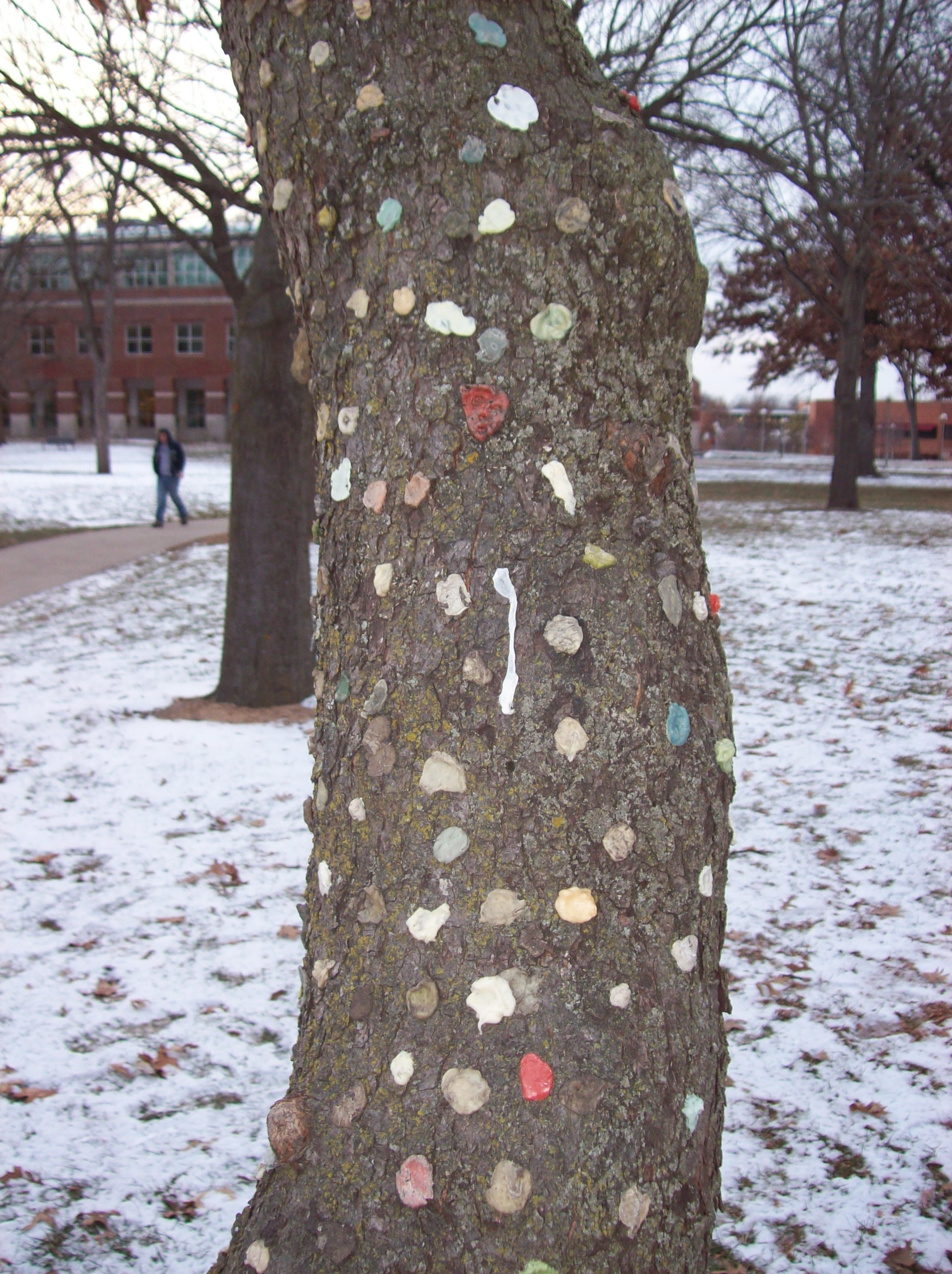
The second Gum Tree near the southwest corner of Ophelia Parrish Hall

- The weather vane atop Kirk Memorial is welded in place so that it will always point northeast, in honor of the school's previous name and its location.
- The annual football game against Northwest Missouri State University was established in 1930 when Northwest president Uel W. Lamkin sent Fair a polished hickory stick from the farm where the former president Eugene Fair was born. The "Hickory Stick" was contested annually until 2013, when Truman and Northwest Missouri began competing in different athletic conferences.
- A tradition has arisen in which students attach wads of gum to a designated tree known as the "Gum Tree." It is believed that a ban on gum chewing in class started a tradition of discarding gum inside a hollow suit of armor sometime in the 1920s, and that eventually this was replaced by the Gum Tree. Students leave their gum on the tree to bring them good luck on exams.

== Athletics ==
Truman is a member of NCAA Division II and plays in the Great Lakes Valley Conference (GLVC), joining the conference in 2013 after having been a member of the Mid-America Intercollegiate Athletics Association (MIAA) since that league's creation in 1912. Because the GLVC did not sponsor wrestling until the 2016–17 season, that team remained in the MIAA.

The athletic department sponsors 20 teams, ten each for men and women. Among Truman's most recent successes are four regional championships for women's volleyball, a regional berth for men's basketball in 2006, a College World Series appearance for baseball, and undefeated regular seasons for both men's and women's soccer. The women's swim team won six consecutive NCAA Women's Swimming and Diving Championships national titles for Division II between 2001 and 2006, and won again in 2008, again beating their in-state rival Drury University.

== See also ==
- Truman State University Press
