= Clarence Green =

American academic administrator

Interim President of Northwest Missouri State University
- In office July 1, 2022 – May 31, 2023
- Preceded by: John Jasinski
- Succeeded by: Lance Tatum

Vice President of Culture of Northwest Missouri State University
- In office July 1, 2019 – June 30, 2022

Chief of University Police of Northwest Missouri State University
- In office 1997–2024

Clarence Green is a former American academic administrator who served as the interim president for Northwest Missouri State University during the 2022-23 academic year.

Green served as the head of the NW university police from 1997-2024. Additionally, Green served as vice president of culture at Northwest Missouri State University from 2019-2022, before taking the presidency in an interim capacity when John Jasinski departed from the presidency at Northwest.

In July 2024, Green took over as director of the Savannah campus of North Central Missouri College.

Green's bachelors degree in sociology and masters degree in higher education leadership are from Northwest Missouri State, and he has a doctorate in educational leadership and policy analysis from the University of Missouri in Columbia, Missouri. He has also served on the U.S. Attorney General Law Enforcement Coordinating Committee (LECC).

== See also ==
- Governance in higher education
