= Robert P. Foster =

Robert Porter Foster (May 24, 1917 – March 10, 2008) was president of Northwest Missouri State University from 1964 to 1977.

During his tenure Northwest's enrollment increased from 500 to 6,500.

== Early life ==
Foster was born in Warrensburg, Missouri and earned a BA from Central Missouri State University in 1939. He was a high school teacher, coach and principal in Carrollton, Missouri High School from 1939 to 1942.

While working on a master's from the University of Missouri, he left to become a lieutenant commander in the U.S. Navy during World War II. After the war he would be state commander of the Missouri American Legion.

In 1943 he married Virginia Mutz Foster of Maryville, Missouri.

== Northwest ==
After the war they moved to Maryville where he purchased E.L Townsend Grocery Co. which he operated until 1948 when he became registrar and later director of admissions at Northwest. He finished his master's in 1951 and a Phd from the University of Missouri in 1960.

He served as dean of administration from 1959 until 1964.

== Northwest president ==
He was the first president to deal with increased competition from Missouri Western State University. His approach was to massively grow the school. Building built under his watch included:

- Garrett-Strong Science Building
- Olive DeLuce Fine Arts Building;
- Four high-rise residence halls
- Donald Valk Building
- Expansion of the J.W. Jones Student Union
- Colden Hall renovations
- Martindale Hall renovations
- Administration Building renovations
- Memorial Bell Tower - the first building funded by the Northwest Foundation
- KXCV

The school changed from a four year school to having a master program resulting in its name change from Northwest Missouri State College to Northwest Missouri State University.

== Post presidency ==
Foster remained active in Maryville after leaving the presidency receiving a Silver Antelope Award for his work in the Boy Scouts.

In 1981 the Robert P. Foster Aquatic Center was named for him.

Academic offices
Preceded by J.W. Jones	President of the Northwest Missouri State University; 1964–1977	Succeeded by B.D. Owens
