= Uel W. Lamkin =

University president in Missouri

Uel Walter Lamkin
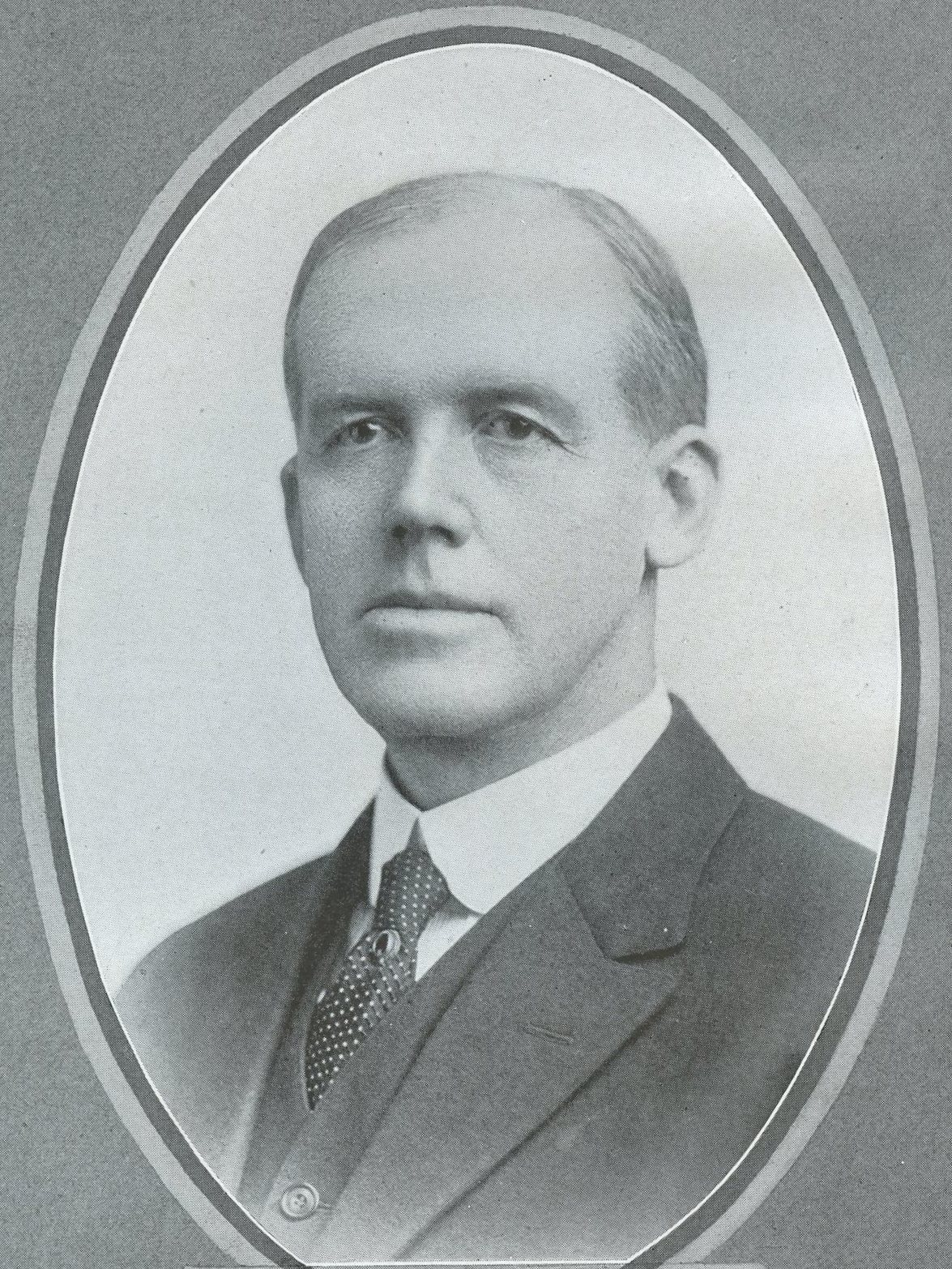

President of Northwest Missouri State University
- In office 1921–1945
- Preceded by: Ira Richardson
- Succeeded by: J. W. Jones

Personal details
- Born: January 18, 1877 California, Missouri, U.S.
- Died: September 16, 1956 (aged 79)

Uel Walter Lamkin (January 18, 1877 – September 16, 1956) was president of Northwest Missouri State University from 1921 to 1945.

Lamkin was born in California, Missouri. He attended the private Clinton, Missouri Academy run by his father. He attended the University of Missouri but did not receive a degree.

He taught in Clinton and was Henry County, Missouri school superintendent, president of Missouri Teachers Association 1912-1913, Missouri education inspector, Missouri superintendent of schools 1916-1918 and president of the National Education Association 1928-29.

During his tenure:

- Roberta Hall (then called Residence Hall) opened in 1923
- Martindale Gymnasium (now called Martindale Hall) opened in 1926
- Northwest Missouri Bearcats men's basketball finished second in the national AAU tournament in 1930 under Hank Iba
- He started the Hickory Stick tradition in 1930 in the football rivalry with Northeast Missouri State Teachers College
- He and college employees took pay cuts during the Great Depression
- The Horace Mann Laboratory School offering K-12 opened in 1937
- The school enrolled in the V-12 Navy College Training Program

Bearcat Arena was named Lamkin Gymnasium for many years. The Arena is now in the Lamkin Activity Center which also includes Martindale Gym. He is buried in Englewood Cemetery in Clinton, Henry County, Missouri.

Academic offices
Preceded by Ira Richardson	President of the Northwest Missouri State University; 1921-1945	Succeeded by J.W. Jones
