= Northwest Missouri State University =

Public university in Maryville, Missouri, US

- Former names: Fifth District Normal School (1905–1919); Northwest Missouri State Teacher's College (1919–1949); Northwest Missouri State College (1949–1972)
- Type: Public university
- Established: 1905; 121 years ago
- Endowment: $45.2 million (2025)
- President: Lance Tatum
- Provost: Dr. Rose Marie Ward
- Academic staff: 255 (Fall 2025)
- Students: 9,664 (Fall 2023)
- Location: Maryville, Missouri, United States; 40°21′12″N 94°53′00″W
- Campus: Rural, 370 acres (149.7 ha)
- Colors: Bearcat green and white
- Nickname: Bearcats
- Sporting affiliations: NCAA Division II – The MIAA
- Mascot: Bobby Bearcat
- Website: www.nwmissouri.edu

Northwest Missouri State University (NW Missouri) is a public university in Maryville, Missouri, United States. It has an enrollment of 9,152 students. Founded in 1905 as a teachers college, its campus is based on the design for Forest Park at the 1904 St. Louis World's Fair and is the official Missouri State Arboretum. The school is governed by a state-appointed Board of Regents and headed by President Lance Tatum.

The Northwest Bearcats compete in the National Collegiate Athletic Association (Division II) and Mid-America Intercollegiate Athletics Association for men's and women's sports.

== History ==
=== Founding ===
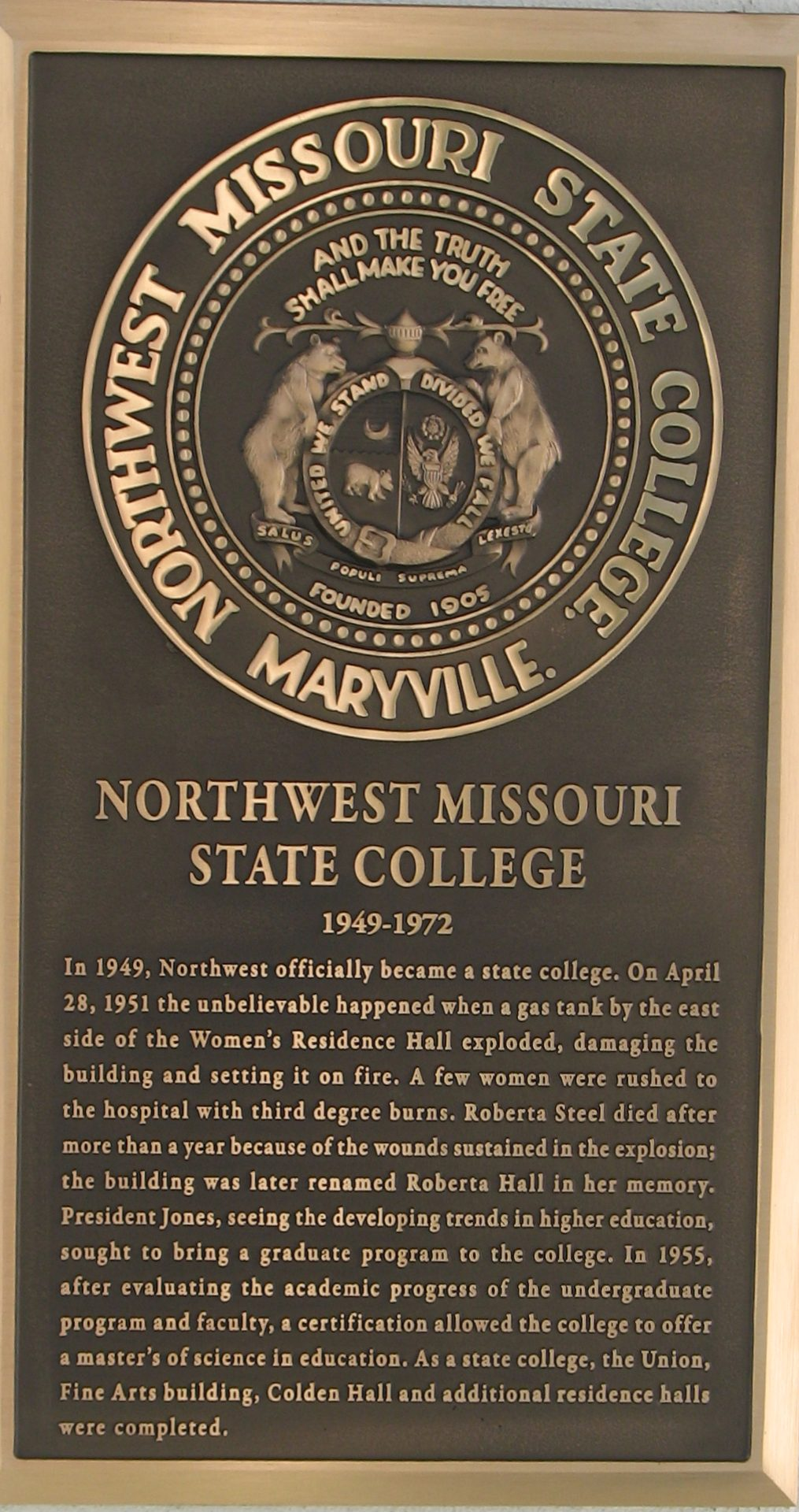
History of Northwest Missouri State College, Bell Tower exhibit

In 1905, the Missouri Legislature created five districts in the state to establish normal schools, comprising a state teacher college network.

Maryville won the competition for the Northwest district with an offer to donate 86 acres (34.8 ha) (on coincidentally the northwest corner of town) and $58,000 on the site of a Methodist Seminary. The other districts in the network were to be at Kirksville (Northeast – now Truman State), Cape Girardeau (Southeast), Springfield (Southwest – now Missouri State), and Warrensburg (Central – now Central Missouri).

The original mission of the school, initially known as the Fifth District Normal School, was to teach elementary school teachers. Classes began on June 13, 1906, with a lab school teaching Maryville's children (that was eventually named the Horace Mann school) in kindergarten through third grade. The school was later expanded to a full-fledged high school before dropping back to its current configuration of kindergarten through sixth grade.

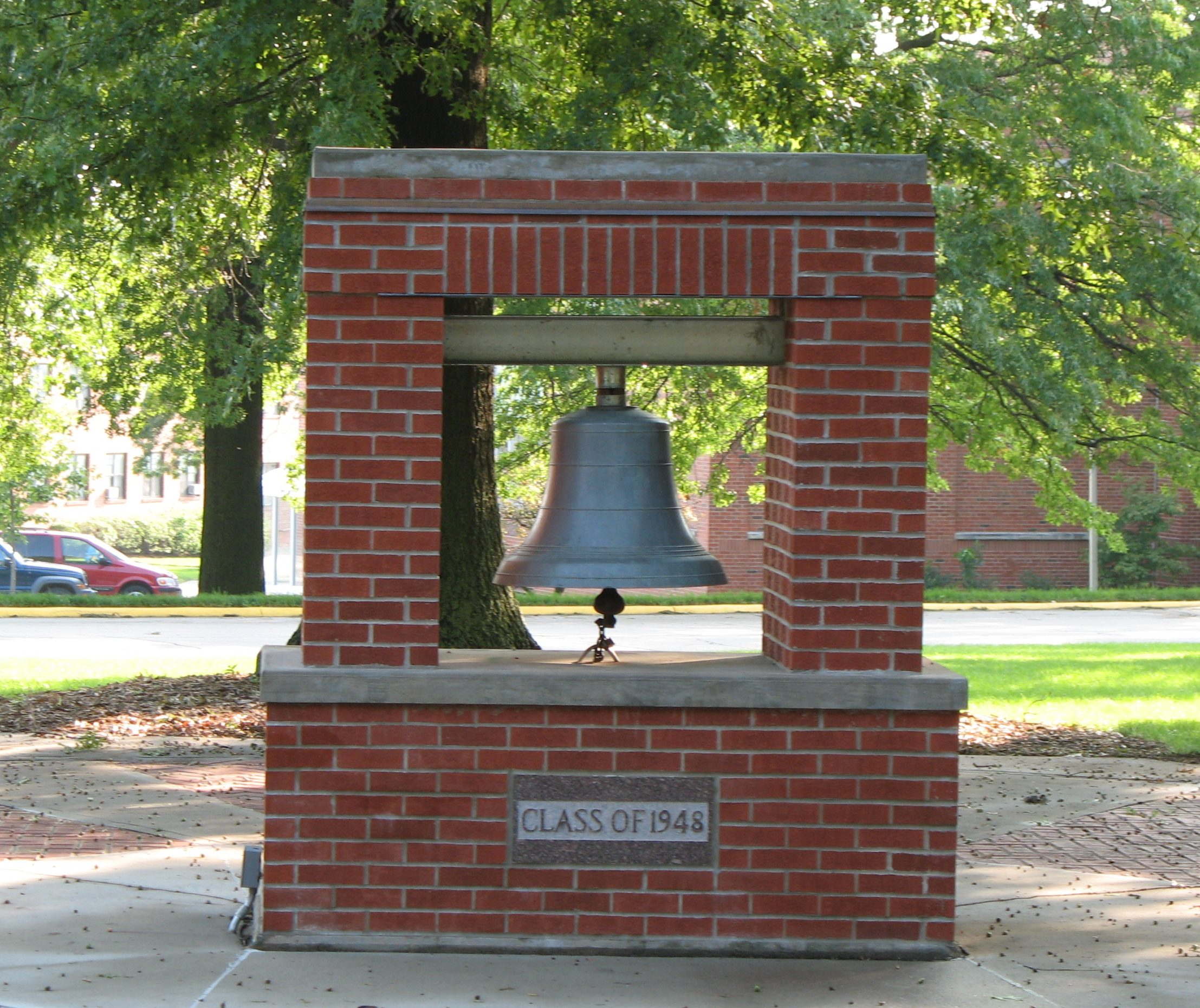
Class of 1948 bell

In 1919 the school was renamed Northwest Missouri State Teacher's College, and with that came the ability to grant baccalaureate degrees. In 1949 the name was shrunk to Northwest Missouri State College by the Board of Regents.

=== World War II ===
During World War II, Northwest Missouri State University was one of 131 colleges and universities nationally that took part in the V-12 Navy College Training Program, which offered students a path to a Navy commission.

=== Rivalry with Missouri Western ===
In 1969, Missouri governor Warren Hearnes pushed for switching St. Joseph Junior College from a two-year school into a four-year state college, which became Missouri Western State University. At approximately the same time, authorities decided against a plan to continue routing Interstate 29 north of St. Joseph alongside U.S. Route 71 through Maryville and on to Clarinda, Iowa, instead picking a route to the Omaha–Council Bluffs metropolitan area along the sparsely populated Missouri River bottoms.

Opening a new four-year state school within 45 miles (72 km) of Maryville (along with a delay in widening U.S. Route 71 to Maryville) was perceived in Maryville as an attempt to kill the school and the town with which it is intertwined. Those fears came to the forefront in 1988 when Shalia Aery, commissioner of higher education under Governor John Ashcroft, announced a plan to close the school. The plan was ultimately withdrawn.

=== Northwest Missouri State University ===
On August 14, 1972, Northwest was elevated to university status so that it could offer master's degrees. Its name changed to Northwest Missouri State University.

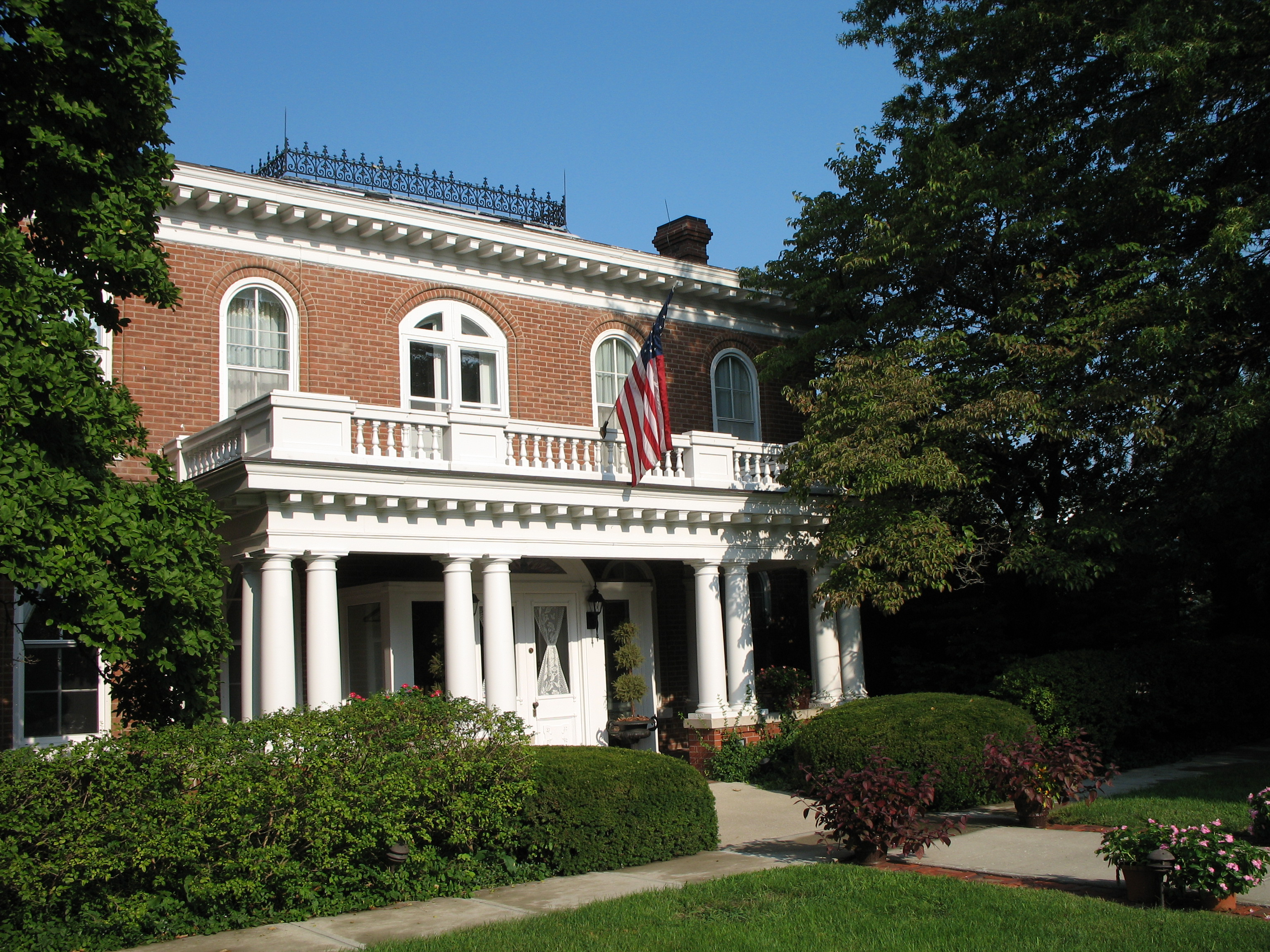
The President's home is the Thomas Gaunt House, which is on the National Register of Historic Places.

In 1987, Northwest unveiled its Electronic Campus Program, the first such program among public U.S. colleges.

=== Missouri State Arboretum ===
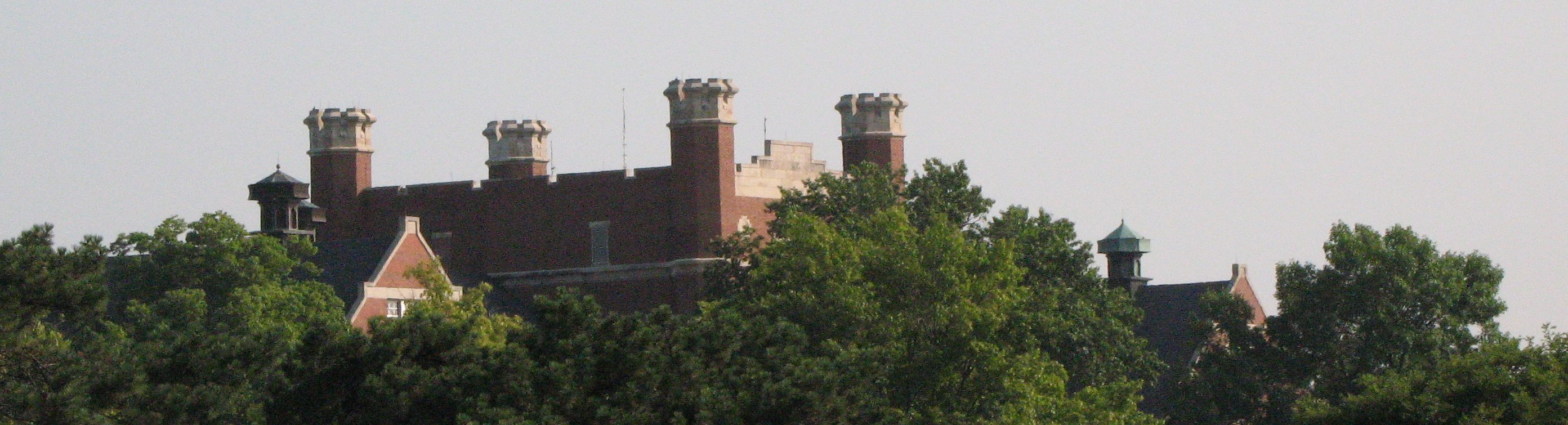
The Administration Building rises above the Missouri State Arboretum

The campus design was inspired by the Forest Park design for the 1904 St. Louis World's Fair, which evolved into the campus for Washington University in St. Louis. In 1993 the state legislature designated Northwest the official Missouri State Arboretum.

=== Presidents ===
- Frank Deerwester (1906–1907)
- Homer Martien Cook (1907–1909)
- Henry Kirby Taylor (1909–1913)
- Ira Richardson (1913–1921)
- Uel W. Lamkin (1921–1945)
- J. W. Jones (1945–1964)
- Robert P. Foster (1964–1977)
- B. D. Owens (1977–1984)
- Dean L. Hubbard (1984–2009)
- John Jasinski (2009–2022)
- Clarence Green (interim, 2022-2023)
- Lance Tatum (2023-Present)

== Administration Building ==
- Administrative Building
- U.S. National Register of Historic Places
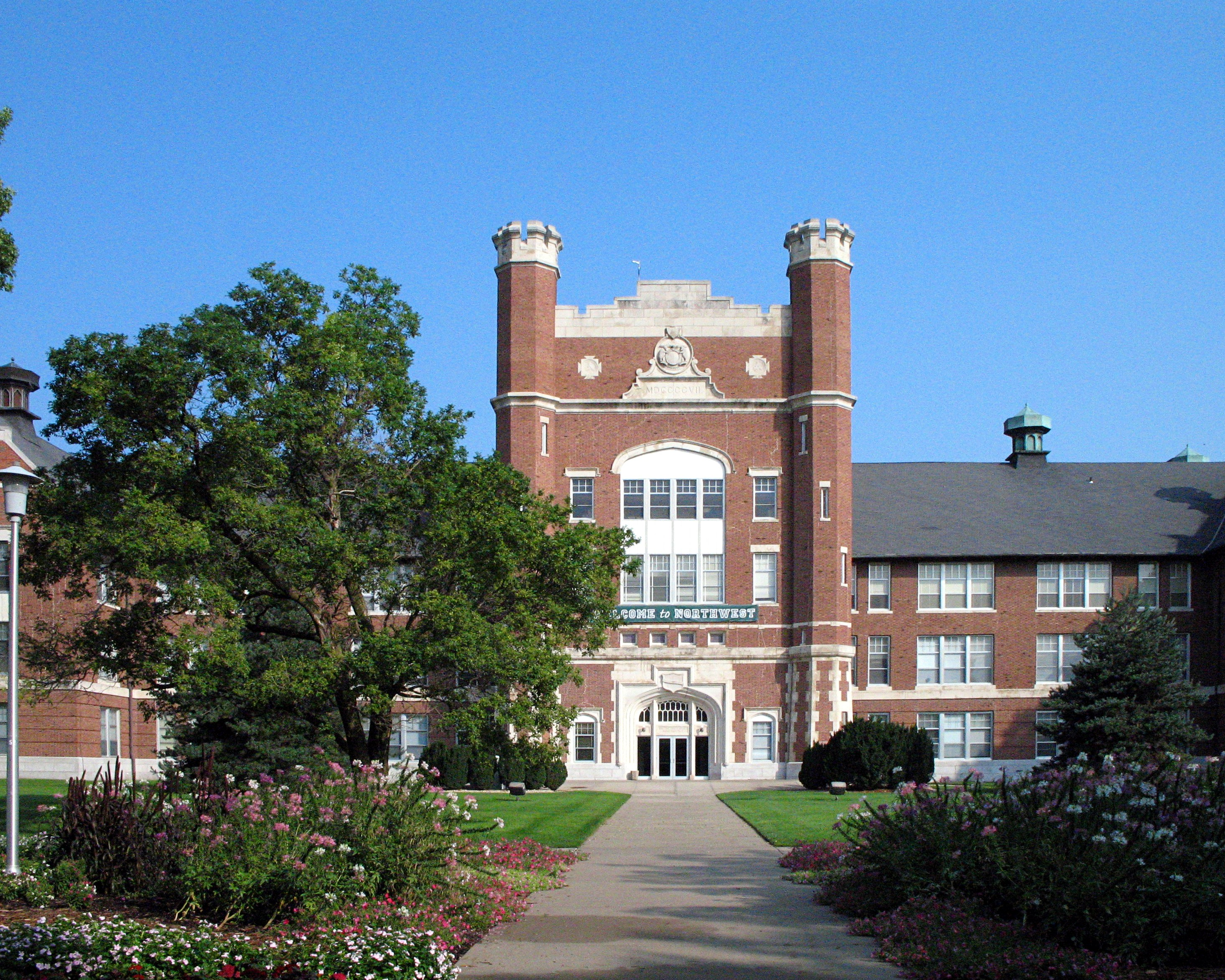
- Northwest's Administration Building

- Location within Missouri Location within the United States
- Location: 800 University Dr, Maryville, Missouri
- Area: 3.2 acres (1.3 ha)
- Architect: Felt, J.H. and Co; Marshall, D.E. and Co
- Architectural style: Late Gothic Revival
- NRHP reference No.: 10000504
- Added to NRHP: June 11, 2010

=== Design ===
The defining landmark of the campus is the Administration Building, similar to Brookings Hall at Washington University in St. Louis. Brookings Hall served as the Administration Building of the 1904 St. Louis World's Fair. The master St. Louis design was created by Cope & Stewardson, famed for designing schools throughout the country based on the Oxford University style. It was listed on the National Register of Historic Places in 2010.

The Collegiate Gothic structure with its central tower keep design evokes Tattershall Castle and lords over the campus with the motto, "And the truth shall make you free," engraved in stone. Because of this design, the term "Tower" is used frequently throughout campus and is the name of the school yearbook. Work on the building began in 1906 and continued on and off until classes began in it on October 3, 1910. The architect of record for the Maryville building is John H. Felt. On March 15, 1919, a tornado ripped the roof off its auditorium and blew out most of its windows.

=== 1979 fire ===
On July 24, 1979, a fire destroyed 60 percent of the building on the central and west wing as well as the north wing housing the auditorium and Little Theater. Many thought the building was going to be razed, However the east wing survived with relatively little damage.

A $13.8 million capital program repaired most of the building and made extensive changes to the campus layout. The building ceased to serve as classroom space, with the exception of 3rd floor, which houses the Family and Consumer Sciences Department. The theater and music departments moved out of the building to what is now the Ron Houston Center for the Performing Arts, located southeast of Bearcat Stadium. The north wing of the Administration Building was torn down and sealed, although the outline of the wing is still visible against the bricks on the north. The former Wells Library (now Wells Hall) was turned into a classroom area and home for the National Public Radio affiliate radio station KXCV-FM and the library was moved to its current location in the new B.D. Owens Library. All the academic files were burned and lost with no backups prior to the fire.

== Athletics ==
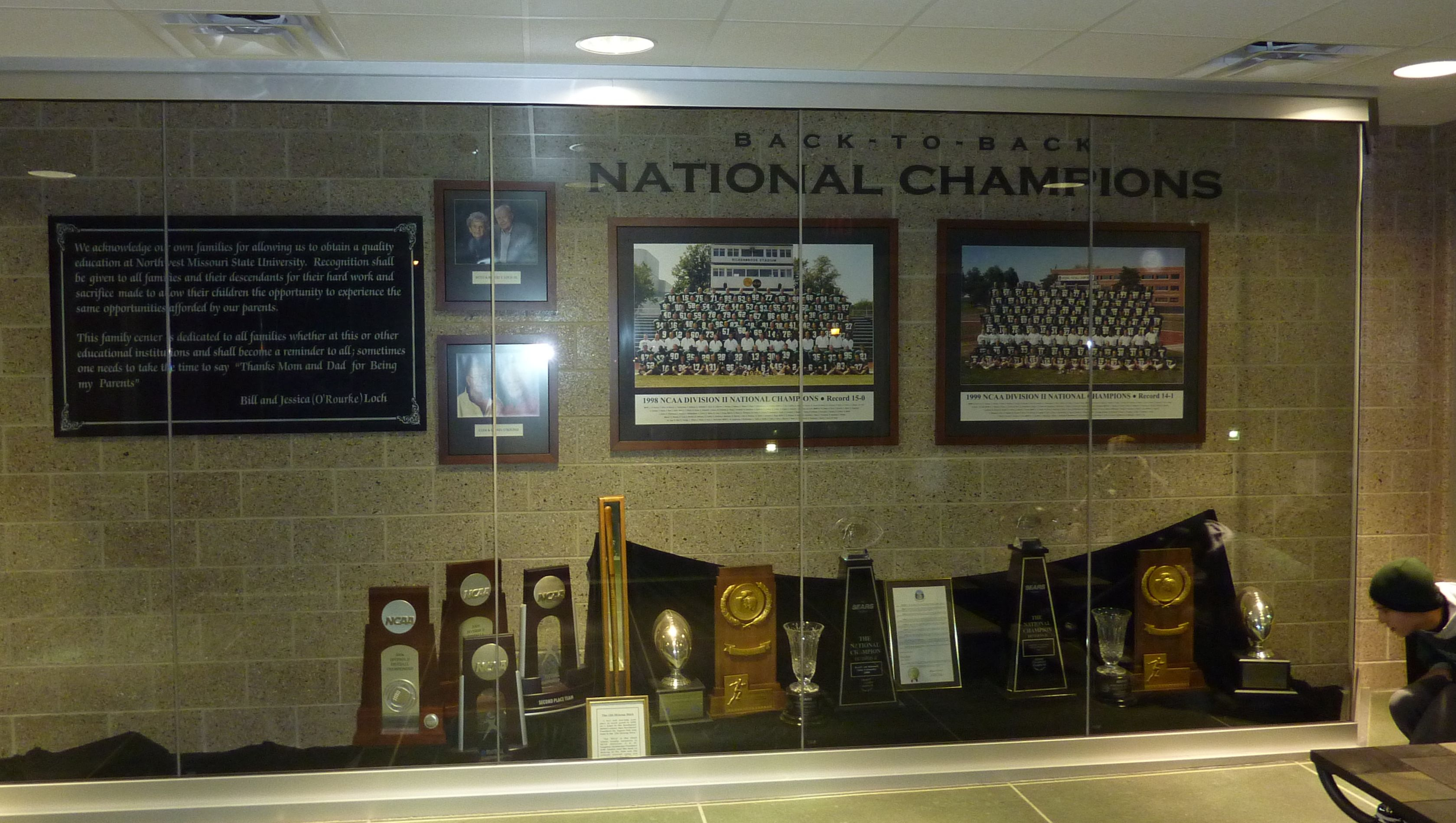
Football championship trophy room at Bearcat Stadium. The two trophies in the middle are national championships in 1998 and 1999. The stick in the middle left is the Hickory Stick in the contests with Truman State.

Northwest was a founding member of the Mid-America Intercollegiate Athletics Association in 1912 and has remained in the conference ever since. From its founding until 1937 it competed in the Amateur Athletic Union. From 1937 to 1957 it competed in the National Association of Intercollegiate Athletics. In 1957 it joined NCAA Division II. Northwest has appeared in ten Division II football title games (winning six) since 1998. The men's basketball team appeared in an AAU title game in 1930. The men's basketball team won the Division II title for the 2016–17 season and 2018-19 season.

The Bearcats have won six NCAA Division II football national championships (1998, 1999, 2009, 2013, 2015, and 2016) and finished four times as runner-up (2005, 2006, 2007, and 2008). The Northwest Bearcats cheerleading squad have won three (2010, 2012, and 2013) Universal Cheerleaders Association Division II National Champions. The Northwest Bearcat Men's Basketball team has won four national championships (2017, 2019, 2021, 2022) in the span of five tournaments. With the 2016 football championship and the 2017 basketball championship, Northwest became the first Division II program to win titles in football and men’s basketball in the same school year. The titles were also the first by a Division I or II program since the Division I Florida Gators in 2006-07.

== Student life ==
Undergraduate demographics as of Fall 2023
| Race and ethnicity | Total |
|---|---|
| White | 82% |
| Hispanic | 5% |
| Black | 4% |
| International student | 3% |
| Two or more races | 3% |
| Unknown | 2% |
| Asian | 1% |
Economic diversity
| Low-income (Note: The percentage of students who received an income-based federal Pell grant intended for low-income students.) | 31% |
| Affluent (Note: The percentage of students who are a part of the American middle class at the bare minimum.) | 69% |

Student organizations encompass activities and interests that include Academic (such as an Association for Computing Machinery chapter), Greek fraternities and sororities, Political (such as the College Republicans or the Young Democrats), Honorary (such as the Blue Key Honor Society and Mortar Board), Multicultural (with groups such as the Alliance of Black Collegians, the Asian Student Association, the Hispanic American Leadership Organization, and the Indian Student Association), Performing (such as the American Choral Directors Association), Religious (such as Campus Crusade for Christ), Residential Life (with student governing bodies for the residential halls), Sports (with clubs for cheerleading, fencing, rugby, soccer, wrestling and equestrian sports), and dozens more.

There are several sororities and fraternities at the university.

=== Student newspaper ===
The Northwest Missourian is the university's bi-weekly student newspaper.

== Notable alumni ==
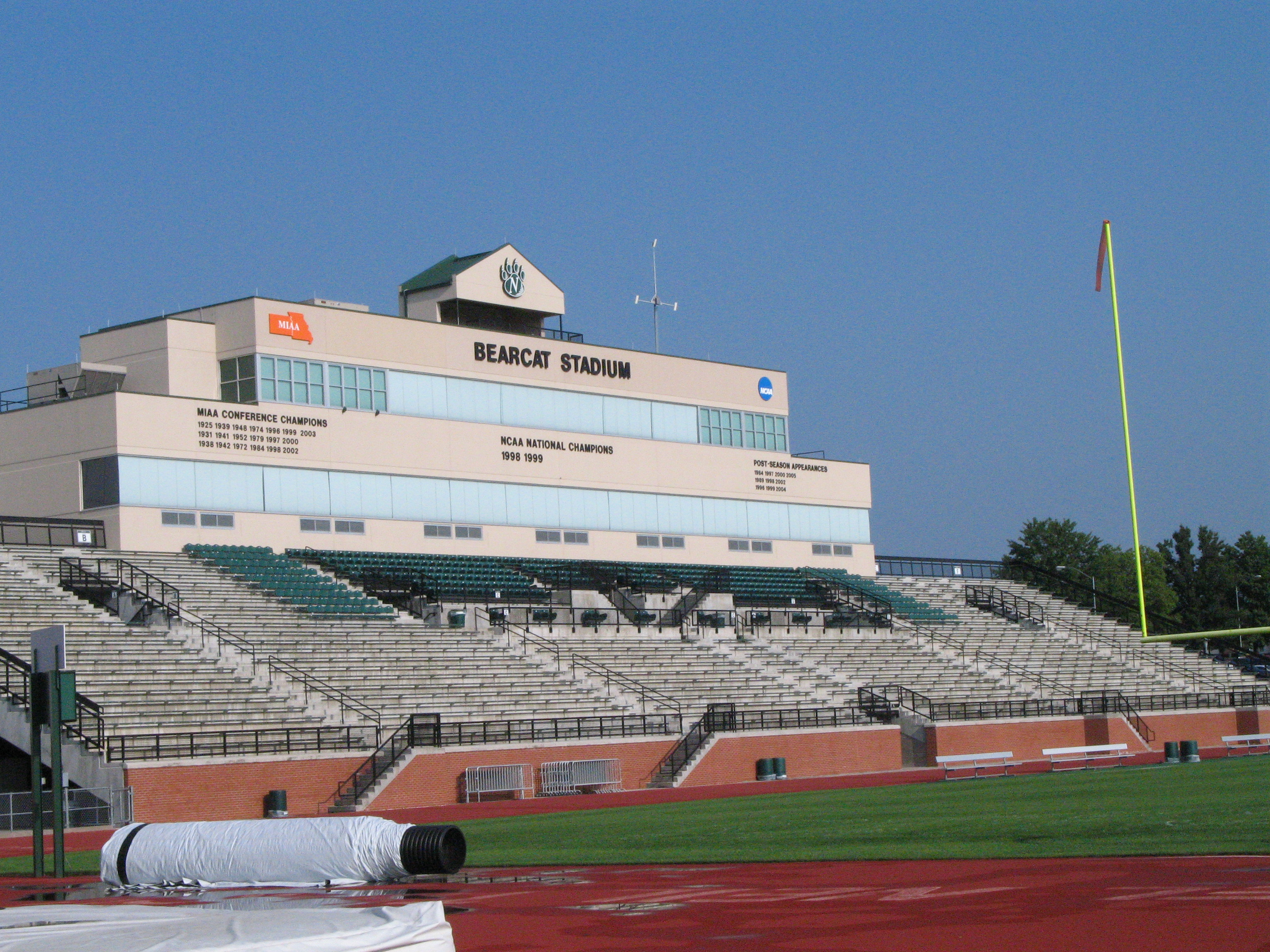
Bearcat Stadium

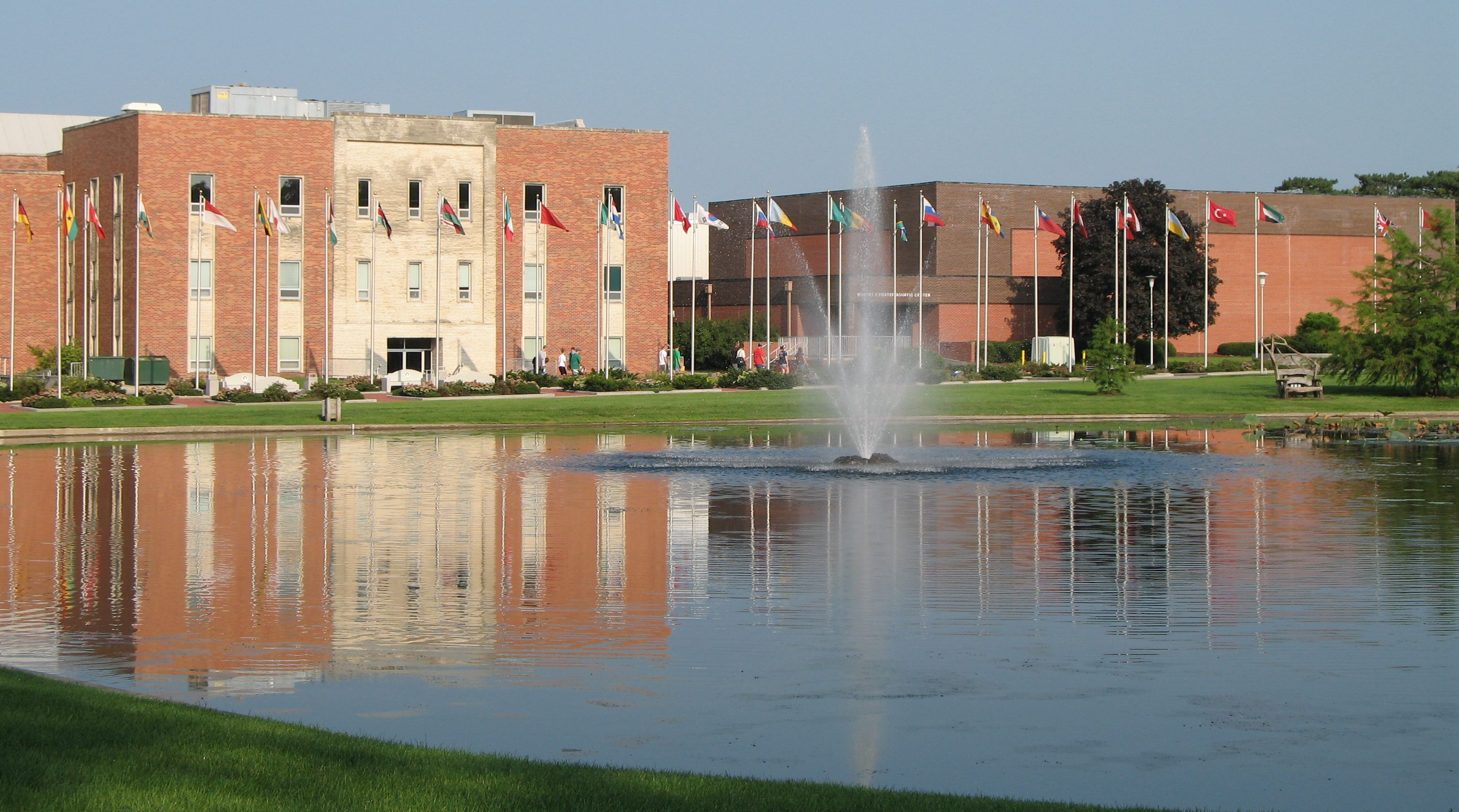
International Walk

=== Computer Science ===
- Jean Bartik – programmer

=== Politicians ===
- Jason R. Brown – Republican leader in the Missouri House of Representatives
- Pat Danner – former U.S. representative from Missouri
- Steve King – U.S. representative from Iowa's 4th congressional district
- Mike Thomson – Republican member of the Missouri House of Representatives
- Kim Reynolds – Governor of Iowa
- Allen Andrews - Republican member of the Missouri House of Representatives

=== Athletes ===
- Trevor Hudgins – professional basketball player
- Baron Corbin – football player, professional wrestler
- Brandon Dixon – football player
- Brian Dixon – football player
- Adam Dorrel – coach
- Duck Dowell – former NBL player and coach
- Charles Finley – former college basketball coach
- Tommy Frevert – former AFL placekicker
- Todd Frohwirth – former Major league baseball player
- Tom Funk – former Major league baseball player
- Gary Gaetti – former Major league baseball player
- Steve Gillispie – baseball college coach
- Chris Greisen – football player
- Harold Hull – former NBL player
- Joe Hurst – former NBL player
- Hal Hutcheson – former NBL player
- Ben McCollum – college basketball coach
- Jack McCracken – AAU basketball player from the 1930s and 1940s who in 1962 was enshrined into the Basketball Hall of Fame.
- Tony Miles – former Canadian Football League wide receiver; school's all-time leader in receptions, receiving yards and receiving touchdowns
- Ryland Milner – former college basketball and football coach
- Xavier Omon – former NFL running back and 2008 6th round draft pick of the Buffalo Bills
- Justin Pitts – professional basketball player
- Jamaica Rector – former NFL wide receiver
- Jhon Rebatta Lam – professional soccer player
- Ivan Schottel – former NFL player and college football coach
- Mike Shane – professional wrestler
- Todd Shane – professional wrestler
- Wilbur Stalcup – former college basketball coach
- Mel Tjeerdsma – coach
- Dave Tollefson – former NFL defensive end
- Seth Wand – former NFL offensive lineman
- Ryan Hawkins – basketball player
