= List of Emporia State Hornets football seasons =

This is a list of Emporia State Hornets football season records. The Emporia State Hornets football team is the football team of Emporia State University, located in the American city of Emporia, Kansas. The team competes as a Mid-America Intercollegiate Athletics Association (MIAA) at the NCAA Division II level.

Since the program's beginning in 1893, they have been known as the Normals, the Teachers, the Yaps, and the Hornets. Since 1937, Emporia State's football team has played in Francis G. Welch Stadium, named after the long-time coach and athletic director at Emporia State.

Emporia State has won 16 conference championships: six in the Kansas Conference, six in the Central Intercollegiate Athletic Conference, two in the Great Plains Athletic Conference, one in the Central States Intercollegiate Conference, and one in the Mid-America Intercollegiate Athletics Association.

== Seasons ==
As of July 6, 2026, the records are up-to-date.

Year	Coach	Overall	Conference	Standing	Bowl/playoffs	Coaches^{#}	AP^{°}
No Coach (None) (1893–1896)
1893	No coach	1–1–0					
1894	No coach	0–2–0					
1895	No coach	0–2–0					
1896	No coach	0–2–0					
No team (Discontinued) (1897–1898)
No Coach (None) (1899)
1899	No coach	2–3–0					
John Lamb (None) (1900)
1900	John Lamb	5–3–1					
Fred Williams (None) (1901)
1901	Fred Williams	3–4–1					
Horace Botsford (Kansas Intercollegiate Athletic Conference) (1902)
1902	Botsford	3–8–0					
Paul Samson (Kansas Conference) (1903–1906)
1903	Paul Samson	3–4–3					
1904	Paul Samson	6–5–0					
1905	Paul Samson	4–5–0					
1906	Paul Samson	4–4–0					
Owen Samuels (Kansas Conference) (1907)
1907	Owen Samuels	1–6–0					
Paul Samson (Kansas Conference) (1908)
1908	Paul Samson	3–5–0					
Fred Honhart (Kansas Conference) (1909–1911)
1909	Fred Honhart	2–4–2					
1910	Fred Honhart	5–2–0					
1911	Fred Honhart	6–2–0					
George Crispin (Kansas Conference) (1912–1913)
1912	George Crispin	5–3–0					
1913	George Crispin	4–6–0					
Homer Woodson Hargiss (Kansas Conference) (1914–1917)
1914	Homer Woodson Hargiss	5–1–1					
1915	Homer Woodson Hargiss	5–2–2					
1916	Homer Woodson Hargiss	6–3–1					
1917	Homer Woodson Hargiss	5–3–1					
H. D. McChesney (Kansas Conference) (1918)
1918	H. D. McChesney	2–2–0					
George McLaren (Kansas Conference) (1919)
1919	George McLaren	1–6–2					
Homer Woodson Hargiss (Kansas Conference) (1920–1927)
1920	Homer Woodson Hargiss	0–6–2					
1921	Homer Woodson Hargiss	7–0–0					
1922	Homer Woodson Hargiss	6–2–0					
1923	Homer Woodson Hargiss	5–1–1					
1924	Homer Woodson Hargiss	4–4–1					
1925	Homer Woodson Hargiss	4–3–1					
1926	Homer Woodson Hargiss	7–0–0					
1927	Homer Woodson Hargiss	7–0–1					
Central Intercollegiate Athletic Conference
Fran Welch (Central Intercollegiate Athletic Conference) (1928–1954)
1928	Fran Welch	6–1–1					
1929	Fran Welch	6–2–0					
1930	Fran Welch	4–2–3					
1931	Fran Welch	4–4–0					
1932	Fran Welch	2–6–1					
1933	Fran Welch	3–5–1					
1934	Fran Welch	7–2–0					
1935	Fran Welch	5–4–0					
1936	Fran Welch	6–4–0					
1937	Fran Welch	5–2–2					
1938	Fran Welch	3–6–0					
1939	Fran Welch	6–3–0					
1940	Fran Welch	6–2–0					
1941	Fran Welch	4–3–2					
1942	Fran Welch	3–4–1					
No team (WWII) (1943–1945)
1946	Fran Welch	4–5–0					
1947	Fran Welch	7–1–1					
1948	Fran Welch	8–2–0			W Missouri-Kansas Bowl		
1949	Fran Welch	6–4–0					
1950	Fran Welch	6–2–1					
1951	Fran Welch	5–3–1					
1952	Fran Welch	7–3–0					
1953	Fran Welch	2–5–1					
1954	Fran Welch	2–7–0					
Keith Caywood (CIAC) (1955–1966)
1955	Keith Caywood	0–10–0					
1956	Keith Caywood	2–6–1					
1957	Keith Caywood	2–7–0					
1958	Keith Caywood	5–4–1			L Mineral Water Bowl		
1959	Keith Caywood	2–7–0					
1960	Keith Caywood	3–5–0					
1961	Keith Caywood	2–7–0					
1962	Keith Caywood	3–5–1					
1963	Keith Caywood	2–5–2					
1964	Keith Caywood	0–9–0					
1965	Keith Caywood	1–8–0					
1966	Keith Caywood	3–6–0					
Ron Blaylock (Rocky Mountain Athletic Conference) (1967–1968)
1967	Ron Blaylock	1–9–0					
1968	Ron Blaylock	5–2–2					
Jim Lance (RMAC) (1969–1970)
1969	Jim Lance	5–4–0					
1970	Jim Lance	1–8–0			L Boot Hill Bowl		
Harold Elliott (RMAC) (1971–1974)
1971	Harold Elliott	3–6–1					
Great Plains Athletic Conference
1972	Harold Elliott	7–4–0					
1973	Harold Elliott	7–2–0					
Dave Hoover (GPAC) (1974–1978)
1974	Dave Hoover	2–7–0					
1975	Dave Hoover	1–9–0					
Central States Intercollegiate Conference
1976	Dave Hoover	0–10–0					
1977	Dave Hoover	3–7–0					
1978	Dave Hoover	2–8–0					
Bob Seaman (Central States Intercollegiate Conference) (1979–1982)
1979	Bob Seamen	4–6–0					
1980	Bob Seamen	2–8–0					
1981	Bob Seamen	1–9–0					
1982	Bob Seamen	3–7–0					
Larry Kramer (CSIC) (1983–1994)
1983	Larry Kramer	2–8–0					
1984	Larry Kramer	3–7–0					
1985	Larry Kramer	6–4–0					
1986	Larry Kramer	8–2–0					
1987	Larry Kramer	7–4–0			L NAIA playoffs		
1988	Larry Kramer	8–3–0			L NAIA playoffs		
Independent
1989	Larry Kramer	11–2–0			L NAIA Championship Game		
1990	Larry Kramer	6–4–0					
Mid-America Intercollegiate Athletics Association
1991	Larry Kramer	5–5–0	4–5				
1992	Larry Kramer	7–3–0	6–3				
1993	Larry Kramer	3–7–0	3–6				
1994	Larry Kramer	5–5–0	4–5				
Manny Matsakis (MIAA) (1995–1998)
1995	Manny Matsakis	5–6	4–5				
1996	Manny Matsakis	5–6	5–4				
1997	Manny Matsakis	8–3	5–4				
1998	Manny Matsakis	9–2	7–2				
Jerry Kill (MIAA) (1999–2000)
1999	Jerry Kill	5–6	4–5				
2000	Jerry Kill	6–5	5–4				
Dave Wiemers (MIAA) (2001–2006)
2001	Dave Wiemers	5–6	2–6				
2002	Dave Wiemers	9–3	6–3		W Mineral Water Bowl		
2003	Dave Wiemers	9–3	7–3	T–1st	L NCAA Div. II Playoffs		
2004	Dave Wiemers	5–6	4–5				
2005	Dave Wiemers	4–6	3–5				
2006	Dave Wiemers	3–8	2–6				
Garin Higgins (MIAA) (2007–present)
2007	Garin Higgins	3–8	1–8	9th			
2008	Garin Higgins	4–7	2–7	8th			
2009	Garin Higgins	2–9	1–8	9th			
2010	Garin Higgins	5–6	3–6	7th			
2011	Garin Higgins	5–6	3–6	6th			
2012	Garin Higgins	10–2	9–2	2nd	W Kanza Bowl		
2013	Garin Higgins	9–2	9–1	2nd	L NCAA Div. II Playoffs		
2014	Garin Higgins	4–7	4–7	T–7th			
2015	Garin Higgins	11–3	9–2	2nd	L NCAA Regionals Final		
2016	Garin Higgins	11–2	10–1	2nd	L NCAA Playoffs		
2017	Garin Higgins	6–5	6–5	T–6th			
2018	Garin Higgins	8–4	7–4	T–4th	L Corsicana Bowl		
2019	Garin Higgins	4–7	4–7	9th			
2020 Season suspended due to COVID-19
2021	Garin Higgins	6–6	6–5	T–5th	L Live United Texarkana Bowl		
2022	Garin Higgins	9–3	8–3	T–3rd	W Live United Texarkana Bowl		
2023	Garin Higgins	9–3	7–3	T–3rd	W Fun Town RV Heritage Bowl	RV	
2024	Garin Higgins	7–4	5–4	T–5th			
2025	Garin Higgins	5–6	4–5	T–6th			
Total:		571–564–43					
National championship Conference title Conference division title or championship game berth
^{#}Rankings from final Coaches Poll.
