= List of Emporia State Hornets head football coaches =

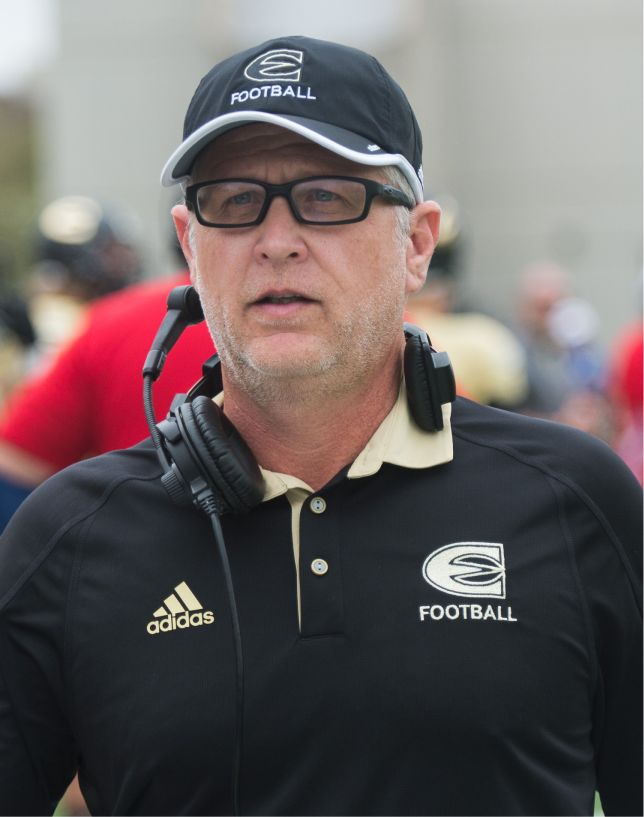
Current head coach Garin Higgins.

The Emporia State Hornets football program is a college football team that represents Emporia State University in the Mid-America Intercollegiate Athletics Association, a part of NCAA Division II. The team has had 24 head coaches since its first recorded football game in 1893. The current coach is Garin Higgins who first took the position for the 2007 season.

== Key ==
Key to symbols in coaches list
General		Overall		Conference		Postseason (Note: Although the first Rose Bowl Game was played in 1902, it has been continuously played since the 1916 game, and is recognized as the oldest bowl game by the NCAA. "—" indicates any season prior to 1916 when postseason games were not played.)	
No.	Order of coaches (Note: A running total of the number of head coaches, with coaches who served separate tenures being counted only once. Interim head coaches are represented with "Int" and are not counted in the running total. "—" indicates the team played but either without a coach or no coach is on record. "X" indicates an interim year without play.)	GC	Games coached	CW	Conference wins	PW	Postseason wins
DC	Division championships	OW	Overall wins	CL	Conference losses	PL	Postseason losses
CC	Conference championships	OL	Overall losses	CT	Conference ties	PT	Postseason ties
NC	National championships	OT	Overall ties (Note: Overtime rules in college football were introduced in 1996, making ties impossible in the period since.)	C%	Conference winning percentage		
†	Elected to the College Football Hall of Fame	O%	Overall winning percentage (Note: When computing the win–loss percentage, a tie counts as half a win and half a loss.)				

== Coaches ==
Statistics correct as of the end of the 2025 college football season.

No.	Name	Term	GC	OW	OL	OT	O%	CW	CL	CT	C%	PW	PL	CCs	NCs	Awards
X	no coach	1893–1896	5	1	4	0	.200	—	—	—		—	—	—	—	
–	no team	1897–1898	0	0	0	0	–	—	—	—		—	—	—	—	
X	no coach	1899	4	2	2	0	.500	—	—	—		—	—	—	—	
1	John Lamb	1900	9	5	3	1	.611	—	—	—		—	—	—	—	
2	Fred A. Williams	1901	9	2	6	1	.278	—	—	—		—	—	—	—	
3	Horace Botsford	1902–1903	20	7	10	3	.425	—	—	—		—	—	—	—	
4, 6	Paul Samson	1904–1906; 1908	32	16	16	0	.500	—	—	—		—	—	—	—	
5	Owen Samuels	1907	7	1	6	0	.143	—	—	—		—	—	—	—	
7	Fred Honhart	1909–1911	23	13	8	2	.609	—	—	—		—	—	—	—	
8	George Crispin	1912–1913	18	9	9	0	.500	—	—	—		—	—	—	—	
9, 12	Homer Woodson Hargiss	1914–1917; 1920–1927	95	61	23	11	.700	—	—	—		—	—	4	—	
10	H. D. McChesney	1918	4	2	2	0	.500	—	—	—		—	—	—	—	
11	George McLaren	1919	8	1	5	2	.250	—	—	—		—	—	—	—	
13	Fran Welch	1928–1942; 1946–1954	212	115	82	15	.578	—	—	—		1	—	6	—	
X	No team	1943–1945	0	0	0	0	–	—	—	—		—	—	—	—	
14	Keith Caywood	1955–1966	109	25	79	5	.252	—	—	—		—	1	—	—	
15	Ron Blaylock	1967–1968	19	6	11	2	.368	—	—	—		—	—	—	—	
16	Jim Lance	1969–1970	18	7	11	0	.389	—	—	—		—	—	—	—	
17	Harold Elliott	1971–1973	29	17	11	1	.603	—	—	—		—	1	2	—	
18	Dave Hoover	1974–1978	49	9	40	0	.184	—	—	—		—	—	—	—	
19	Bob Seaman	1979–1982	40	10	30	0	.250	—	—	—		—	—	—	—	
20	Larry Kramer	1983–1994	126	71	55	0	.563	—	—	—		2	3	1	—	
21	Manny Matsakis	1995–1998	44	26	18	0	.591	—	—	—		—	—	—	—	
22	Jerry Kill	1999–2000	22	11	11	0	.500	—	—	—		—	—	—	—	
23	Dave Wiemers	2001–2006	67	35	32	0	.522	—	—	—		1	1	1	—	
24	Garin Higgins	2007–present	208	118	90	0	.567	97	85	—	.533	6	4	—	—	

== See also ==
- List of people from Lyon County, Kansas
