= List of people from Lyon County, Kansas =

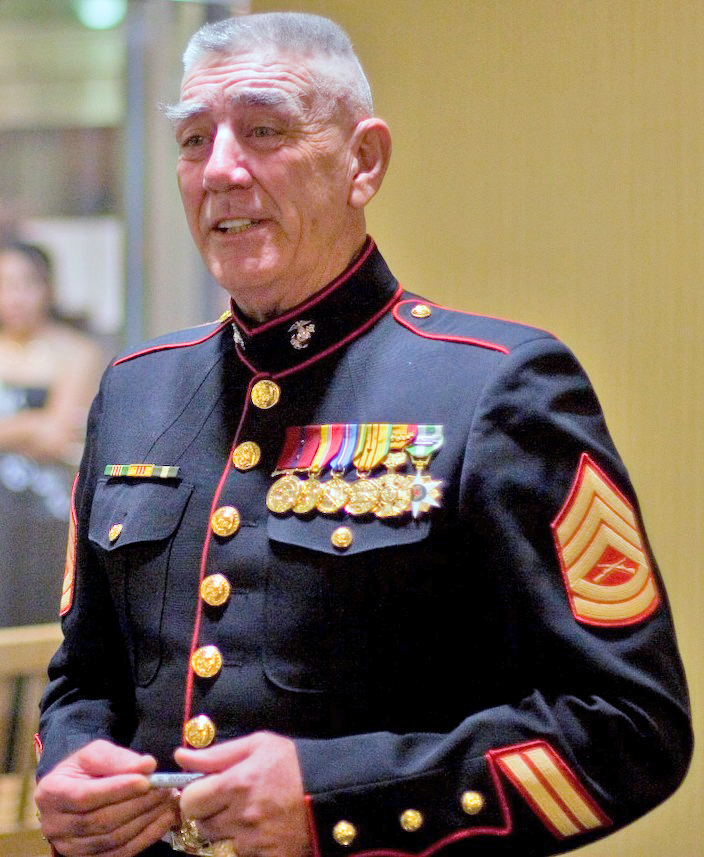
Former Marine drill instructor turned actor R. Lee Ermey was born in Emporia, Kansas.

The following is a list of people from Lyon County, Kansas. Inclusion on the list should be reserved for notable people past and present who have resided in the county, either in cities or rural areas.

== List of people from Lyon County, Kansas ==
=== Academics ===
- Frank A. Beach, ethologist, co-author of the 1951 book Patterns of Sexual Behavior
- Carl Salser, former dean of the College of Education at Oregon State University

=== Arts and communication ===
- Don Coldsmith, author of primarily Western fiction
- Melora Creager, formerly cellist and lead singer and chief composer of the trio Rasputina
- R. Lee Ermey, actor
- Thelma Hill, silent film star
- Evan Lindquist, artist, printmaker, and Artist Laureate of the State of Arkansas
- Keith Waldrop, author
- William Allen White, publisher
- William Lindsay White, publisher

=== Athletics ===
==== American football ====
See also List of Emporia State Hornets head football coaches

- Horace Botsford, college football coach 1901–1903
- Henry Brock, college football coach
- Harold Elliott, college football coach
- Jim Everett, NFL quarterback
- Homer Woodson Hargiss, college football coach
- Lem Harkey, San Francisco 49ers
- Fred Honhart, college football coach
- Jerry Kill, college football coach
- John Lamb, first coach of the Emporia State Hornets football team
- Leon Lett, professional football player with the Dallas Cowboys
- Manny Matsakis, college football coach
- H. D. McChesney, college football coach
- Paul Samson, American football
- Owen Samuels, college football coach
- Bob Seaman, college football coach; became head coach after Wichita State University football team plane crash
- Norman Sterry, college football player
- Fran Welch, college football coach
- Dave Wiemers, college football coach
- Fred Williams, college football coach

==== Auto racing ====
- Clint Bowyer, NASCAR driver

==== Baseball ====
- Ross Grimsley, baseball player

==== Basketball ====
- Dean Smith, college basketball coach

==== Golf ====
- J. L. Lewis, professional golfer

=== Clergy ===
- Bob Mize, bishop of Damaraland from 1960

=== Infamous ===
- Mark Essex, spree killer who killed 9 people, including 5 police officers, and wounded 13 others in New Orleans on December 31, 1972 and January 7, 1973

=== Military ===
- James Harbord, lieutenant general in the United States Army
- Grant F. Timmerman, U.S. Marine posthumously awarded the Medal of Honor during World War II

=== Politicians ===
- Jim Barnett, politician
- Don Hill, politician
- Jeff Longbine, politician
- Peggy Mast, Kansas politician
- Louise Porter, Kansas state senator
- Bob Price, politician from Texas
- Edward Herbert Rees, teacher and member of the United States House of Representatives
- Roy Wilford Riegle, probate judge, Senate member, Masonic Society Grand Master

=== Other ===
- Alvin M. Johnston, test pilot
- Maud Wagner, first female tattoo artist in the U.S.

== See also ==
- Lists of people from Kansas
