= Paul Samson (disambiguation) =

Paul Samson (1953–2002) was an English guitarist.

Paul Samson may also refer to:

- Paul Samson (American football) (1879–1967), American football coach
- Paul Samson (swimmer) (1905–1982), American swimmer, water polo player and cardiothoracic surgeon
- Paul Samson-Körner (1887–1942), German heavyweight boxer

== See also ==
- Samson (name)
- Paul Sampson (born 1977), English rugby union player
