= 2012 Lone Star Conference football season =

American college football season

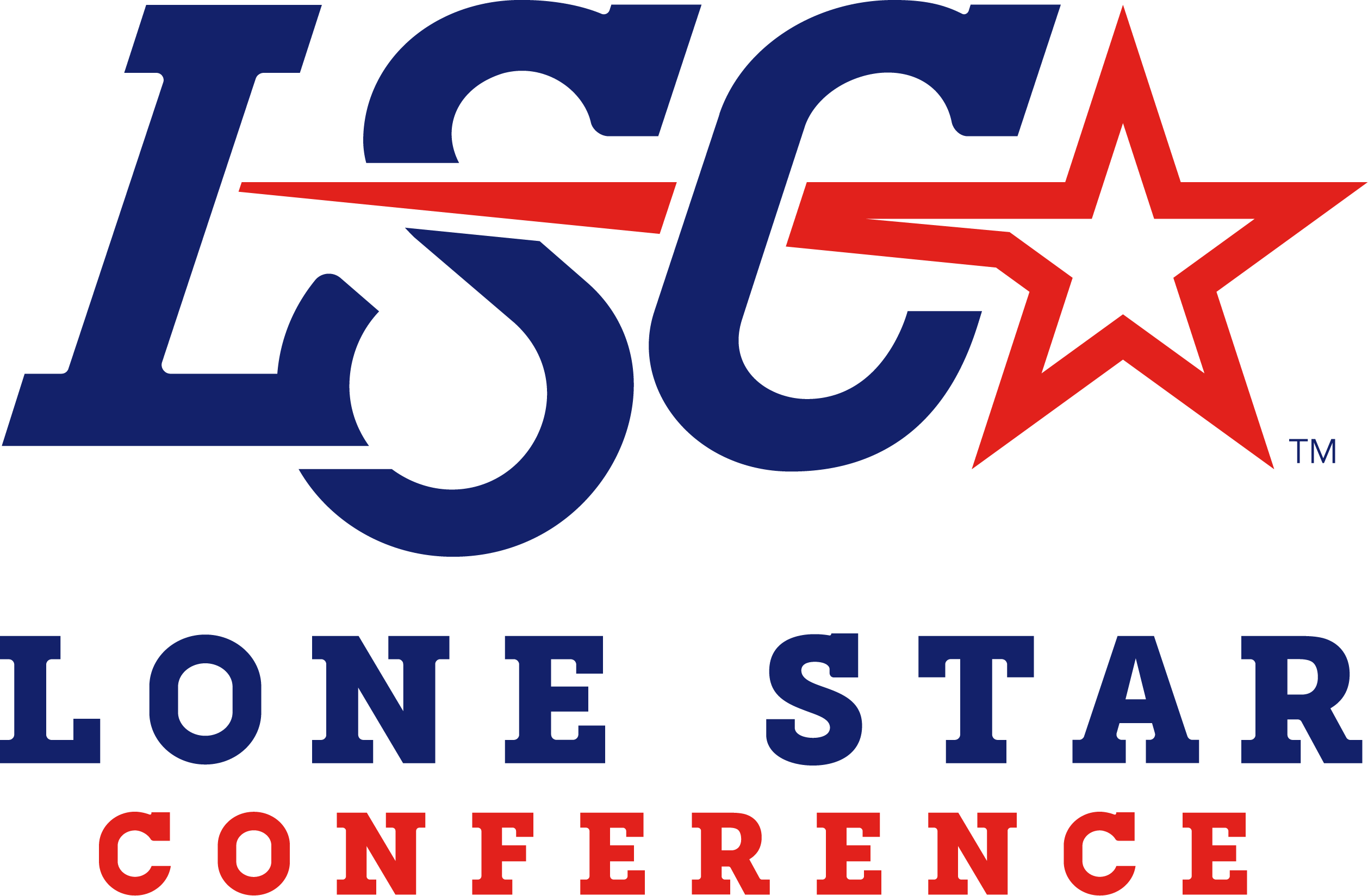
- League: NCAA Division II
- Sport: football
- Duration: August 30, 2012 through December 8, 2012
- Teams: 9

Regular season
- Season champions: Midwestern State, West Texas A&M

2012 Lone Star Conference football standings
	Conf.			Overall
Team	W		L	W		L
No. 16 Midwestern State +^	7	–	1	9	–	2
No. 4 West Texas A&M +^	7	–	1	12	–	3
Tarleton State	5	–	3	6	–	4
Texas A&M–Kingsville #	5	–	3	6	–	6
Abilene Christian	4	–	4	7	–	4
Angelo State	4	–	4	5	–	6
Eastern New Mexico †	2	–	6	3	–	7
Incarnate Word	1	–	7	2	–	9
Texas A&M–Commerce	1	–	7	1	–	9
+ – Conference co-champions; ^ – NCAA Division II playoff participant; # – Kanza Bowl participant † – Eastern New Mexico vacated all three wins; Rankings from AFCA poll

The 2012 Lone Star Conference football began on August 30 when West Texas A&M lost to CSU-Pueblo and ended with West Texas A&M loss against Winston-Salem in the NCAA D2 Semi Final on December 8. It was Abilene Christian and Incarnated Word last season before they moved to NCAA D1 Southland Conference.

== Stadiums ==
School	Stadium	Capacity
Abilene Christian	Shotwell Stadium	15,057
Angelo State	LeGrand Sports Complex	5,670
Eastern New Mexico	Greyhound Stadium	5,200
Incarnate Word	Gayle and Tom Benson Stadium	6,000
Midwestern State	Memorial Stadium	14,500
Tarleton State	Memorial Stadium	7,000
Texas A&M–Commerce	Memorial Stadium	11,582
Texas A&M–Kingsville	Javelina Stadium	15,000
West Texas A&M	Kimbrough Memorial Stadium	25,000

== Preseason ==
=== Abilene Christian ===
Last season Abilene Christian finished 16th in nation with a record of 8-3 and 7-1 in conference. ACU reach the playoff for sixth time in a row before being eliminated by Washburn in the first round.

Abilene Christian announced that the Offensive coordinator Ken Collums would take over the head coach position after Chris Thomsen left to take over the running back coach position at Arizona State. Collums hired former Coffeyville Community College head coach Darian Dulin as the defensive coach and former head coach of East New Mexico Grayhounds Mark Ribaudo as the line backer coach

ACU were ranked No. 13 in the Lindy's magazine pre-season poll. The Wildcats were picked to finish second in the conference. The American Football Coaches' Association ranked Abilene Christian 10th in their pre-season poll while usacollegefootball.com ranked the wildcats 16th in their pre-season poll.

Mitchell Gale was named NCAA Division II pre-season Offensive Player of the Year by Lindy's magazine. He threw for 3.823 and 28 touchdowns last season. He was also place on the pre-season All-American first team along with Lone Star Conference's Offensive Preseason Player of the Year. The placekicker Morgan Lineberry was also select for the pre-season All-American first team while wide receiver Taylor Gabriel was selected on the pre-season All-American third team.

Abilene Christian got couple of transfers, defensive backs Jeremy Rivers from Elmhurst University and tight end Noah Cheshier from Louisiana Tech University.

=== Angelo State ===
Angelo State finished 5-6, 2-6 in conference last season, making it sixth year in a row that ASU missed the playoffs.

The Rams brought in couple of transfers, running back Jermie Calhoun from University of Oklahoma and linebacker T.J. Jackson from Southeastern Louisiana University

Last year offensive coordinator Russell Gaskamp left to take over the Oklahoma Panhandle State University program. Angelo State promoted the assistant coach Theron Aych to the offensive coordinator. Jay Eilers arrived from Marshall High School to take the offensive line coach position. Gary Salgado was named the new defensive end coach and special team coordinator after spending last season as a graduate assistant. Drew Dallas was promoted from offensive graduate assistant to recruiting coordinator and offensive assistant.

ASU was picked to finish sixth in the pre-season Lone Star Conference pool.

=== Eastern New Mexico ===
The Greyhounds ended last season with a record of 2-9 and 1-7 in conference play.

Eastern New Mexico hired Josh Lynn to replace Mark Ribaudo who resigned at the end of the season.

=== Incarnate Word ===
The Cardinals finish last season with 2-8 record and 2-6 in conference with wins against Eastern New Mexico and Texas A&M - Commerce.

Larry Kennan was hired to replace Mike Santiago who resign last season.

=== Midwestern State ===
The Mustangs last year season came to end in heartbreaking fashion when they lost to Northwest Missouri State University in overtime, in the second round of the NCAA DII playoff, ending their season with a 10-1 record and 8-0 in conference. The Lone Star Conference champions finished the season ranked 7th in the country.

Midwestern State are ranked in top 5 in two pre-season polls, 4th in the Lindy's Sports College Football Preview and 5th in USA Today 2012 College Football.

The offensive tackle Ken Van Huele was picked on Lindy's first team All-American list while the Quarter Back Brandon Kelsey and running back Keidrick Jackson named to the second team.

=== Preseason votes ===
Ranked	School	Points	First place votes
1	Midwestern State	215	19
2	Abilene Christian	187	5
3	West Texas A&M	179	0
4	Texas A&M–Kingsville	158	1
5	Tarleton State	131	0
6	Angelo State	99	0
7	Incarnate Word	74	0
8	Eastern New Mexico	43	0
9	Texas A&M–Commerce	39	0

=== Preseason All American ===
Pre-Season All-American
1-3 Team	Name	Position	School
1st Team	Mitchell Gale	QB	ACU
1st Team	Morgan Lineberry	PK	ACU
2nd Team	Marquis Wadley	LB	TSU
3rd Team	Trent Rios	RB	UIW
3rd Team	Taylor Gabriel	WR	ACU
3rd Team	Marquis Wadley	LB	TSU
3rd Team	Jeremy Aguilar	LB	TAMUK
3rd Team	Chaz Pavliska	S	UIW

=== Watch List ===
Texas A&M-Kingsville junior place kicker Matt Stoll on the Mitchell Award Watch List.

=== Transfers ===
Several players transferred to schools in the Lone Star Conference

Players
Name	Position	Old School	New School
Zach Rodes	QB	ULM	Incarnate Word
Jermie Calhoun	RB	Oklahoma	Angelo State
Garret Williams	WR	Stephen F. Austin	Incarnate Word
Terrence Smith	WR	Southern Nazarene	Midwestern State
T.J. Jackson	LB	Southeastern Louisiana	Angelo State
Dravannti Johnson	LB	Texas	Incarnate Word
Vernon Brook	LB	Kansas	Midwestern State
Robert Wheeler	CB	Central Arkansas	Texas A&M–Commerce
Garret Rhodes	P	Baylor	Midwestern State
Andy Alkhazshvilly	PK	Central Oklahoma	Midwestern State

== Regular season ==
Index to colors and formatting
Non-conference matchup; LSC member won
Non-conference matchup; LSC member lost
Conference matchup

All times Central time. LSC teams in bold.

=== Week one ===
Date	Time	Visiting team	Home team	Site	TV	Result	Attendance	Ref.
August 30	6:00 pm	No. 24 **West Texas A&M**	No. 6 CSU–Pueblo	Neta and Eddie DeRose ThunderBowl • Pueblo, CO	KCIT	**L** CSUP 44-34	6,457	Box Score
September 1	6:00 pm	Southeastern Oklahoma	**A&M-Commerce**	Memorial Stadium • Commerce, Texas		**L** SOSU 31-6	2,000	Box Score
September 1	6:00 pm	**Eastern New Mexico**	New Mexico Highlands	Perkins Stadium • Las Vegas, NM		**L** NMH 42-14	4,800	Box Score
September 1	6:00 pm	McMurry	No. 10 **Abilene Christian**	Shotwell Stadium • Abilene, TX	Mix 92.5 FM	**W** AC 51-0	11,337	Box Score
September 1	7:00 pm	Western Colorado	**Angelo State**	San Angelo Stadium • San Angelo, Texas		**W** ASU 42-14	6,433	Box Score
September 1	7:00 pm	Central Washington	**Texas A&M-Kingsville**	Javelina Stadium • Kingsville, TX		**W** TAMUK 35-7	9,638	Box Score
September 1	7:00 pm	Texas College	**Incarnate Word**	Gayle and Tom Benson Stadium • San Antonio, TX		**W** IW 19-12	4,522	Box Score
^{#}Rankings from AP Poll released prior to game.

Top Performers

Passing			Rushing			Receiving		
Player (s)	Team (s)	Stats (yards)	Player (s)	Team (s)	Stats (yards)	Player (s)	Team (s)	Stats (yards)
Dustin Vaughan	West Texas A&M	398	J. Woodson	Texas A&M–Kingsville	93	Torrence Allen	West Texas A&M	164
Blake Hamblin	Angelo State	320	Marcel Threat	Abilene Christian	88	Lance Ratliff	West Texas A&M	153
Mitchell Gale	Abilene Christian	290	Jermie Calhoun	Angelo State	71	Joey Knight	Angelo State	111

=== Week two ===
Date	Time	Visiting team	Home team	Site	TV	Result	Attendance	Ref.
September 8	1:05 pm	**A&M-Commerce**	UTSA	Alamodome • San Antonio, Texas		**L** UTSA 27-16	30,416	
September 8	2:00 pm	Chadron State	**Angelo State**	San Angelo Stadium • San Angelo, Texas		**L** CSU 19-7	6,202	
September 8	2:00 pm	Sul Ross	**Eastern New Mexico**	Greyhound Stadium • Portales, NM		**W** ENM 38-35	4,127	
September 8	6:00 pm	**Incarnate Word**	Sam Houston	Bowers Stadium • Huntsville, Texas		**L** SHS 54-7	11,061	
September 8	6:00 pm	No. 24 **Texas A&M-Kingsville**	No. 9 **Abilene Christian**	Shotwell Stadium • Abilene, TX	KRBC-TV.	TAMUK 16-13	7,435	
September 8	6:00 pm	Western State	**West Texas A&M**	Kimbrough Memorial Stadium • Canyon, Texas		**W** WT 57-20	8,432	
September 8	7:00 pm	No. 4 **Midwestern State**	**Tarleton State**	Memorial Stadium • Stephenville, TX		TAR 20-17	6,027	
^{#}Rankings from AP Poll released prior to game.

Top Performers

Passing			Rushing			Receiving		
Player (s)	Team (s)	Stats (yards)	Player (s)	Team (s)	Stats (yards)	Player (s)	Team (s)	Stats (yards)
Dustin Vaughan	West Texas A&M	409	Jerome Regal	Tarleton State	152	N. Slaughter	West Texas A&M	132
Nate Poppell	Texas A&M–Kingsville	372	Geremy Alridge	West Texas A&M	102	Sherman Batiste	Texas A&M–Kingsville	128
Deric Davis	Texas A&M–Commerce	175	Jermie Calhoun	Angelo State	96	Torrence Allen	West Texas A&M	122

=== Week three ===
Date	Time	Visiting team	Home team	Site	TV	Result	Attendance	Ref.
September 13	6:00 pm	**A&M-Commerce**	No. 16 **Midwestern State**	Cowboys Stadium • Arlington, Texas	CBS Sports Network	MSU 65-14	3,426	
September 14	12:00 pm	Valdosta State	**Angelo State**	Cowboys Stadium • Arlington, Texas		**L** VSU 43-10	19,134	
September 14	3:30 pm	**Incarnate Word**	**Eastern New Mexico**	Cowboys Stadium • Arlington, Texas		ENM 34-24	10,620	
September 15	4:00 pm	**Tarleton State**	**Abilene Christian**	Cowboys Stadium • Arlington, Texas		ACU 34-31	19,134	
September 15	8:00 pm	No. 14 **Texas A&M-Kingsville**	**West Texas A&M**	Cowboys Stadium • Arlington, Texas	TV2	WT 40-10	19,134	
^{#}Rankings from AP Poll released prior to game.

Top Performers

Passing			Rushing			Receiving		
Player (s)	Team (s)	Stats (yards)	Player (s)	Team (s)	Stats (yards)	Player (s)	Team (s)	Stats (yards)
Aaron Doyle	Tarleton State	377	Chauncey Harris	Midwestern State	148	C.J. Akins	Angelo State	114
Mitchell Gale	Abilene Christian	279	Zach Rhodes	Incarnate Word	128	Clifton Rhodes III	Tarleton State	106
Dustin Vaughan	West Texas A&M	250	Trent Rios	Incarnate Word	121	Jeken Frye	Tarleton State	92

=== Week four ===
Date	Time	Visiting team	Home team	Site	TV	Result	Attendance	Ref.
September 22	6:00 pm	No. 19 **Abilene Christian**	**Angelo State**	San Angelo Stadium • San Angelo, Texas		ASU 28-23	7,320	
September 22	7:00 pm	No. 25 **West Texas A&M**	**Incarnate Word**	Benson Stadium • San Antonio, TX		WT 24-0	4,755	
September 22	7:00 pm	No. 25 **Midwestern State**	**Texas A&M-Kingsville**	Javelina Stadium • Kingsville, Texas	FoxSportsSouthwest.com	MSU 45-28	4,136	
September 22	7:00 pm	**Eastern New Mexico**	**Tarleton State**	Tarleton Memorial • Stephenville, TX		TSU 35-23	6,437	
^{#}Rankings from AP Poll released prior to game.

Top Performers

Passing			Rushing			Receiving		
Player (s)	Team (s)	Stats (yards)	Player (s)	Team (s)	Stats (yards)	Player (s)	Team (s)	Stats (yards)
Bryan Ehrlich	Texas A&M–Kingsville	415	Vaughn Smith	Tarleton State	168	Demarcus Thompson	Abilene Christian	131
Mitchell Gale	Abilene Christian	308	Keidrick Jackson	Midwestern State	156	Dillon Metzger	Tarleton State	131
Blake Hamblin	Angelo State	277	Jimmy Pipkin	Midwestern State	113	Clifton Rhodes III	Eastern New Mexico	111

=== Week five ===
Date	Time	Visiting team	Home team	Site	TV	Result	Attendance	Ref.
September 27	6:00 pm	**Abilene Christian**	Delta State	McCool Stadium • Cleveland, Mississippi	GSC-TV	**W** ACU 34-28	5,123	
September 29	2:00 pm	**Angelo State**	**Eastern New Mexico**	Greyhound Stadium • Portales, NM		ASU 49-19	3,127	
September 29	6:00 pm	**Texas A&M-Kingsville**	**A&M-Commerce**	Memorial Stadium • Commerce, Texas		TAMUC 21-14	924	
September 29	6:00 pm	**Tarleton State**	No. 23 **West Texas A&M**	Kimbrough Memoria • Canyon, Texas		WT 41-21	7,825	
September 29	7:00 pm	**Incarnate Word**	No. 14 **Midwestern State**	Memeroial Stadium • Wichita Falls, Texas	Time Warner Cable	MSU 34-7	6,742	
^{#}Rankings from AP Poll released prior to game.

Top Performers

Passing			Rushing			Receiving		
Player (s)	Team (s)	Stats (yards)	Player (s)	Team (s)	Stats (yards)	Player (s)	Team (s)	Stats (yards)
Dustin Vaughan	West Texas A&M	331	Keidrick Jackson	Midwestern State	173	C.J. Akins	Angelo State	160
Mitchell Gale	Abilene Christian	246	Vaughn Smith	Tarleton State	134	Torrence Allen	West Texas A&M	104
Deric Davis	Texas A&M–Commerce	214	Khiry Robinson	West Texas A&M	125	Khiry Robinson	West Texas A&M	90

=== Week six ===
Date	Time	Visiting team	Home team	Site	TV	Result	Attendance	Ref.
October 4	6:35 pm	No. 13 **Midwestern State**	No. 18 West Alabama	Tiger Stadium • Livingston, AL	ESPN3 & KJBO-LP	**W** MSU 42-27	2,050	
October 6	6:00 pm	**Eastern New Mexico**	**Abilene Christian**	Shotwell Stadium • Abilene, TX	Mix 92.5 FM	ACU 59-17	3,576	
October 6	6:00 pm	No. 21 **West Texas A&M**	**Angelo State**	San Angelo Stadium • San Angelo, Texas		WT 35-9	4,822	
October 6	7:00 pm	**A&M-Commerce**	**Incarnate Word**	Benson Stadium • San Antonio, TX		IW 31-9	2,200	
October 6	7:00 pm	Delta State	**Tarleton State**	Tarleton Memorial • Stephenville, TX		**L** DSU 38-35	2,218	
October 6	7:00 pm	North Alabama	**Texas A&M-Kingsville**	Javelina Stadium • Kingsville, Texas		**L** NA 21-16	9,468	
^{#}Rankings from AP Poll released prior to game.

Top Performers

Passing			Rushing			Receiving		
Player (s)	Team (s)	Stats (yards)	Player (s)	Team (s)	Stats (yards)	Player (s)	Team (s)	Stats (yards)
Aaron Doyle	Tarleton State	293	Keidrick Jackson	Midwestern State	193	Taylor Gabrie	Abilene Christian	112
Nate Poppell	Texas A&M–Kingsville	287	Khiry Robinson	West Texas A&M	144	Darr. Cantu-Harkless	Abilene Christian	80
Blake Hamblin	Angelo State	264	Wesley Wood	Eastern New Mexico	138	A. Coleman	West Texas A&M	75

=== Week seven ===
Date	Time	Visiting team	Home team	Site	TV	Result	Attendance	Ref.
October 13	6:00 pm	**Tarleton State**	**A&M-Commerce**	Memorial Stadium • Commerce, Texas		TSU 43-10	2,105	
October 13	6:00 pm	**Abilene Christian**	No. 20 **West Texas A&M**	Kimbrough Memorial • Canyon, Texas	FoxSportsSouthwest.com	WT 36-0	13,019	
October 13	7:00 pm	**Incarnate Word**	**Texas A&M-Kingsville**	Javelina Stadium • Kingsville, Tx		TAMUK 20-17	6,120	
October 13	7:00 pm	**Angelo State**	No. 13 **Midwestern State**	Memorial Stadium • Wichita Falls, Texas		MSU 35-28	7,743	
^{#}Rankings from AP Poll released prior to game.

Top Performers

Passing			Rushing			Receiving		
Player (s)	Team (s)	Stats (yards)	Player (s)	Team (s)	Stats (yards)	Player (s)	Team (s)	Stats (yards)
Dustin Vaughan	West Texas A&M	359	Brandon Kelsey	Midwestern State	156	Jeken Frye	Tarleton State	103
Aaron Doyle	Tarleton State	224	Anthony Johnson	Texas A&M–Kingsville	127	Jarrian Rhone	West Texas A&M	103
Mitchell Gale	Abilene Christian	207	Zach Henshaw	Tarleton State	119	C.J. Akins	Angelo State	90

=== Week eight ===
Date	Time	Visiting team	Home team	Site	TV	Result	Attendance	Ref.
October 20	2:00 pm	No. 12 **Midwestern State**	**Abilene Christian**	Shotwell Stadium • Abilene, TX		MSU 35-31	7,212	
October 20	4:00 pm	**A&M-Commerce**	**Angelo State**	San Angelo Stadium • San Angelo, Texas		ASU 17-16	6,345	
October 20	6:00 pm	**Texas A&M-Kingsville**	**Tarleton State**	Tarleton Memorial • Stephenville, TX		TAMUK 35-23	6,216	
October 20	6:00 pm	No. 17 **West Texas A&M**	**Eastern New Mexico**	Greyhound Stadium • Portales, NM		WT 44-21	2,759	
October 20	7:00 pm	McMurry	**Incarnate Word**	Benson Stadium • San Antonio, TX		**L** McM 28-20	2,263	
^{#}Rankings from AP Poll released prior to game.

Top Performers

Passing			Rushing			Receiving		
Player (s)	Team (s)	Stats (yards)	Player (s)	Team (s)	Stats (yards)	Player (s)	Team (s)	Stats (yards)
Mitchell Gale	Abilene Christian	335	Keidrick Jackson	Midwestern State	205	N. Slaughter	West Texas A&M	133
Dustin Vaughan	West Texas A&M	321	Brandon Kelsey	Midwestern State	142	Clifton Rhodes III	Tarleton State	117
Jake Fenske	Tarleton State	234	Anthony Johnson	Texas A&M–Kingsville	135	Taylor Gabriel	Abilene Christian	116

=== Week nine ===
Date	Time	Visiting team	Home team	Site	TV	Result	Attendance	Ref.
October 27	2:00 pm	**Abilene Christian**	**A&M-Commerce**	Memorial Stadium • Commerce, Texas		ACU 24-17	5,224	
October 27	7:00 pm	**Tarleton State**	**Incarnate Word**	Benson Stadium • San Antonio, TX		TSU 45-20	2,069	
October 27	7:00 pm	**Angelo State**	**Texas A&M-Kingsville**	Javelina Stadium • Kingsville, Tx		TAMUK 34-21	9,065	
October 27	7:00 pm	**Eastern New Mexico**	No. 11 **Midwestern State**	Memorial Stadium • Wichita Falls, Texas	FoxSportsSouthwest.com	MSU 51-28	3,128	
October 27	8:00 pm	No. 14 **West Texas A&M**	West Georgia	University Stadium • Carrollton, GA	ESPN3	**W** WT 52-28	2,886	
^{#}Rankings from AP Poll released prior to game.

Top Performers

Passing			Rushing			Receiving		
Player (s)	Team (s)	Stats (yards)	Player (s)	Team (s)	Stats (yards)	Player (s)	Team (s)	Stats (yards)
Dustin Vaughan	West Texas A&M	331	Chauncey Harris	Midwestern State	155	C.J. Akins	Angelo State	128
Kevin Vye	Texas A&M–Commerce	313	Keidrick Jackson	Midwestern State	125	Darian Hogg	Abilene Christian	117
Jake Fenske	Tarleton State	280	Khiry Robinson	West Texas A&M	89	Jeken Frye	Tarleton State	114

=== Week ten ===
Date	Time	Visiting team	Home team	Site	TV	Result	Attendance	Ref.
November 1	7:36 pm	**Texas A&M-Kingsville**	No. 24 Valdosta State	Bazemore–Hyder Stadium • Valdosta, Georgia	ESPN3	**L** VSU 38-31	3,711	
November 3	12:00 pm	No. 13 West Alabama	**Abilene Christian**	Shotwell Stadium • Abilene, TX		**W** ACU 22-16	3,517	
November 3	2:00 pm	**Incarnate Word**	**Angelo State**	San Angelo Stadium • San Angelo, TX		ASU 38-21	6,457	
November 3	1:00 pm	**A&M-Commerce**	**Eastern New Mexico**	Greyhound Stadium • Portales, NM		ENM 7-3	2,118	
November 3	6:00 pm	No. 10 **Midwestern State**	No. 12 **West Texas A&M**	Kimbrough Memorial • Canyon, Texas		MSU 52-48	12,238	
November 3	3:00 pm	**Tarleton State**	North Alabama	Braly Municipal Stadium • Florence, AL	ESPN3	**W** TSU 38-28	9,067	
^{#}Rankings from AP Poll released prior to game.

Top Performers

Passing			Rushing			Receiving		
Player (s)	Team (s)	Stats (yards)	Player (s)	Team (s)	Stats (yards)	Player (s)	Team (s)	Stats (yards)
Dustin Vaughan	West Texas A&M	391	Khiry Robinson	West Texas A&M	147	Lance Ratliff	West Texas A&M	180
Jake Fenske	Tarleton State	311	Keidrick Jackson	Midwestern State	133	R. Armstrong	Texas A&M–Kingsville	137
Mitchell Gale	Abilene Christian	284	Vaughn Smith	Tarleton State	126	Darr. Cantu-Harkless	Abilene Christian	113

=== Week eleven ===
Date	Time	Visiting team	Home team	Site	TV	Result	Attendance	Ref.
November 10	1:00 pm	West Georgia	No. 9 **Midwestern State**	Memorial Stadium • Wichita Falls, Texas		**W** MSU 35-17	8,550	
November 10	2:00 pm	No. 17 **West Texas A&M**	**A&M-Commerce**	Memorial Stadium • Commerce, Texas		WT 45-14	1,521	
November 10	7:00 pm	**Abilene Christian**	**Incarnate Word**	Benson Stadium • San Antonio, TX		ACU 24-12	2,649	
November 10	7:00 pm	**Angelo State**	**Tarleton State**	Tarleton Memorial • Stephenvill, TX		TSU 54-37	6,348	
November 10	7:05 pm	**Eastern New Mexico**	**Texas A&M-Kingsville**	Javelina Stadium • Kingsville, Texas		TAMUK 33-13	8,137	
^{#}Rankings from AP Poll released prior to game.

Top Performers

Passing			Rushing			Receiving		
Player (s)	Team (s)	Stats (yards)	Player (s)	Team (s)	Stats (yards)	Player (s)	Team (s)	Stats (yards)
Jake Fenske	Tarleton State	460	Chauncey Harris	Midwestern State	232	Jeken Frye	Tarleton State	180
Mitchell Gale	Abilene Christian	408	Khiry Robinson	West Texas A&M	110	R. Armstrong	Texas A&M–Kingsville	144
Dustin Vaughan	West Texas A&M	278	Keidrick Jackson	Midwestern State	104	Jacob Johnson	Eastern New Mexico	120

=== Postseason ===
Date	Time	Visiting team	Home team	Site	TV	Result	Attendance	Ref.
November 17	12:05 pm	No. 16 **West Texas A&M**	No. 20 Chadron State	Elliott Field • Chadron, NE		**W** WT 38-30	1,490	
November 17	1:00 pm	No. 8 **Midwestern State**	No. 18 Indianapolis	Key Stadium • Indianapolis, IN		**L** IN 31-14	6,235	
November 24	11:05 pm	No. 16 **West Texas A&M**	No. 4 Ashland	Jack Miller Stadium • Ashland, OH		**W** WT 33-28	2,842	
November 25	1:30 pm	**Texas A&M-Kingsville**	No. 24 Emporia State	Hummer Sports Park • Topeka, KS		**L** ESU 45-38	4,300	
December 1	12:00 pm	No. 16 **West Texas A&M**	No. 1 CSU-Pueblo	DeRose ThunderBowl • Pueblo, CO		**W** WT 34-13	10,217	
December 8	6:30 pm	No. 16 **West Texas A&M**	No. 2 Winston-Salem State	Bowman-Gray Stadium • Winston-Salem, N.C.		**L** WSSU 41-18	8,612	
^{#}Rankings from AP Poll released prior to game.

== Weekly awards ==
Following each week of games, Lone Star conference officials select the players of the week from the conference's teams.

Week	Offensive			Defensive			Special teams		
Week	Player (s)	Position (s)	Team (s)	Player (s)	Position (s)	Team (s)	Player (s)	Position (s)	Team (s)
1	Torrence Allen	WR	WT	Nick Richardson	DE	ACU	Nathan Slaughter	PR/KR	WT
2	Jerome Regal	RB	TSU	Marquis Wadley - Marquis Singleton	LB - DE	TSU - TAMUK	Matt Stoll	K	TAMUK
3	Taylor Gabriel	WR	ACU	Taylor McCuller - Neiko Conway	LB - CB	WT - MSU	Marcus Wright	PR/KR	UIW
4	Keidrick Jackson	RB	MSU	Rush Seaver	LB	ASU	Greg Saladino	K	MSU
5	Khiry Robinson	RB	WT	Danny Mason	LB	TAMUC	Greg Saladino	K	MSU
6	Keidrick Jackson	RB	MSU	Curtis Slater	CB	WT	Cade Stone	PR/KR	ACU
7	Dustin Vaughan	QB	WT	Ethan Westbrooks	DE	WT	Sergio Castillo, Jr - Blake Barnes	K	WT - TSU
8	Brandon Kelsey - Khiry Robinson	QB - RB	MSU - WT	Ethan Westbrooks - Mark Savere	DE - LB	WT - TAMUK	Jonathan Woodson	PR/KR	TAMUK
9	Dustin Vaughan	QB	WT	Taylor McCuller	LB	WT	Matt Stoll	K	TAMUK
10	Brandon Kelsey	QB	MSU	Matt Ellerbrock	LB	MSU	Marqui Christian	FR	MSU
11	Mitchell Gale - Jake Fenske - Chauncey Harris	QB - QB - RB	ACU - TSU - MSU	Justin Stephens	LB	ACU	Blake Barnes	K	TSU

== Postseason awards ==
=== All American ===
Name	Position	School	1-3 Team
Ken Van Heule	OG	MSU	2nd Team (Associated Press Little All American) (Collegiate Sports Information Directors of America)
Rufus Johnson	DE	TST	2nd Team (Beyond Sports Network (BSN) All-America Team.)
Jeremy Aguilar	LB	TAMUK	1ST Team (AFCA Division II All-America Team) 2nd Team (2012 D2Football.com All-America )

=== All-conference teams ===
Offense

Position	1st Team		2nd Team	
Position	Player	School	Player	School
QB	Dustin Vaughan	WT	Brandon Kelsey	MSU
RB	Keidrick Jackson	MSU	Vaughn Smith	TSU
RB	Khiry Robinson	WT	Anthony Johnson	TAMUK
FB	Blake Smith	ASU	Elton Crochran	ACU
WR	Taylor Gabriel	ACU	Darrell Cantu-Harkless	ACU
WR	Sherman Batiste	TAMUK	C.J. Akins	ASU
WR	Torrence Allen	WT	Clifton Rhodes III	TSU
WR	Robert Armstrong	TAMUK	Lance Ratliff	WT
TE	Andrew Mocio	UIW	Antwon Williams	ASU
C	Justen Tyler	C	Isi Cocker	ASU
OG	Ken Van Heule	MSU	Tino Tuilata	MSU
OG	Aaron Mullane	WT	Nick Perez	TSU
OT	Joe 'Unga	MSU	Adrian Campbell	TSU
OT	Manase Foketi	WT	Lucus Love	TSU

Defense

Position	1st Team		2nd Team	
Position	Player	School	Player	School
DT	Joey Searcy II	ASU	Brian Ford	TSU
DT	Tyrell Higgins	WT	Darnell Hicks	TAMUK
DE	Rufus Johnson	TSU	Bryan Johnson	WT
DE	Ethan Westbrooks	WT	Marquis Singleton	TAMUK
ILB	Marquis Wadley	TSU	Rush Seaver	ASU
ILB	Jeremy Aguilar	TAMUK	Taylor Mcculler	WT
OLB	Donald Napoleon	MSU	Mike Wallace	ACU
OLB	Danny Mason	TAMUC	Perron Sellers	ENM
S	L.B. Suggs	ACU	Jayson Serda	ENM
S	Taiyon Jackson	MSU	Steve Harris	TAMUK
S	Curtis Slater	WT	Alvin Johnson	Angeol State
CB	Steven Ford	ACU	Alvin Johnson	ACU
CB	Dashaun Phillips	TSU	Devan Avery	UIW
CB	Torian Oakley	WT	Coryan Briggs	MSU

Special Team

Position	1st Team		2nd Team	
Position	Player	School	Player	School
P	Spencer Covey	ACU	Angel Millan	TAMUK
K			Greg Saladino	MSU
K	Sergio Castillo, Jr.	WT	Blake Barnes	TSU
DS	Avery Rigg	ASU	Randall Arbuckle	MSU
RS	Khiry Robinson	WT	Taylor Gabriel	ACU

Honorable mention

Offense
Name	Position	School
Mitchell Gale	QB	ACU
Wes Wood	QB	ENM
Trent Rios	RB	UIW
Chauncey Harris	RB	MSU
Dakarai Pecikonis	WR	ASU
Jared Freeman	WR	MSU
Arthur Buckingham	WR	TSU
Garrett Smith	WR	TAMUC
Brad Dittmar	TE	MSU
Will McLane	TE	TSU
Ricky Padilla	C	ENM
Josh Perez	OG	ACU
John Mendoza	OG	ENM
Xavier Ruben	OG	TSU
Blake Spears	OT	ACU
Trent Davis	OT	ASU
Devin Threatt	OT	UIW
Bryan Keith	OT	MSU

Defense
Name	Position	School
Melvin Shead	DT	ACU
Nick Richardson	DE	ACU
Clayton Callicutt	DE	ASU
Austin Benson	DE	ASU
Patrick Bettiol	DE	TSU
Thor Woerner	ILB	ACU
Matt Ellerbrock	ILB	MSU
Matt Knicky	OLB	TSU
Chaz Pavliska	S	UIW
Angel Lopez	S	ACU
Pat Gardner	S	MSU
Willie Riley	CB	ENM
Blair Johnson	S	TSU
Charles Moore	S	TSU

Special Team
Name	Position	School
Manny Nunez	P	UIW
Isaac Arellano	P	TSU
Brent Schroeder	DS	ACU
Darrell Cantu-Harkless	RS	ACU

=== Daktronics All-Super Region Team ===
First Team

- Keidrick Jackson (RB) - MSU
- Ken Van Heule (OL) - MSU
- Manase Foketi (OL) - WT
- Ethan Westbrooks (DL) - WT
- Rufus Johnson (DL) - TSU
- Sergio Castillo, Jr. (PK) - WT

Second Team

- Dustin Vaughan (QB) - WT
- Torrence Allen (WR) - WT
- Aaron Mullane (OL) - WT
- Taylor McCuller (LB) - WT
- Blake Barnes (PK) - TSU
- Devan Avery (CB - IW

=== Conferences awards ===
- Defensive Player of the Year: Ethan Westbrooks (DL). WT
- Freshman of the Year: Clayton Callicutt (DL), ASU
- Receiver of the year: Taylor Gabriel, ACU & Robert Armstrong, TAMUK
- Offensive Lineman of the Year: Ken Van Heule (0G), MSU
- Defensive Lineman of the Year: Rufus Johnson (DE), TSU
- Linebacker of the Year: Danny Mason, TAMUC
- Defensive Back of the year: L.B. Suggs, ACU
- Coach of the year: Bill Maskill (MSU) & Bo Atterberry (TAMUK)

== Players going pro ==
Name	Position	School	Pro Team	Acquired
Morgan Lineberry	K	ACU	Carolina Panthers	Undrafted free agent
C.J. Akins	WR	ASU	St. Louis Rams	Undrafted free agent
J. J. Unga	OG	MSU	Baltimore Ravens	Undrafted free agent
Manase Foketi	OL	WT	Denver Broncos	Undrafted free agent
Khiry Robinson	RB	WT	New Orleans Saints	Undrafted free agent
Mitchell Gale	QB	ACU	Toronto Argonauts	Undrafted free agent

== Stats ==
=== Team ===
Scoring Offense

Teams	Points	Avg/G
West Texas A&M	425	38.6
Midwestern State	425	38.6
Tarleton State	345	34.5
Abilene Christian	315	28.6
Angelo State	286	26.0
Texas A&M–Kingsville	310	25.8
Eastern New Mexico	214	21.4
Incarnate Word	178	16.2
Texas A&M–Commerce	126	12.6

Scoring Defense

Teams	Points	Avg/g
Abilene Christian	236	21.5
West Texas A&M	331	22.1
Texas A&M–Kingsville	304	25.3
Midwestern State	279	25.4
Tarleton State	283	28.3
Angelo State	313	28.5
Incarnate Word	322	29.3
Texas A&M–Commerce	304	30.4
Eastern New Mexico	375	37.5

Total Offense

Teams	Yards	Avg/g
West Texas A&M	7124	474.9
Tarleton State	4625	462.5
Midwestern State	5049	459.0
Texas A&M–Kingsville	4704	392
Angelo State	3985	362.3
Abilene Christian	3897	354.3
Eastern New Mexico	3344	334.4
Incarnate Word	3001	272.8
Texas A&M–Commerce	2675	267.5

Total Defense

Teams	Yards	Avg/g
Angelo State	3706	336.9
West Texas A&M	5244	349.6
Texas A&M–Kingsville	4242	353.5
Tarleton State	3604	360.4
Midwestern State	4095	372.3
Texas A&M–Commerce	3730	373.0
Incarnate Word	4176	379.3
Abilene Christian	4552	413.8
Eastern New Mexico	4336	433.6

Rushing Offense

Teams	Yards	Avg/g
Midwestern State	3563	323.9
Eastern New Mexico	1914	191.4
Tarleton State	1761	176.1
West Texas A&M	2144	142.9
Texas A&M–Kingsville	1533	127.8
Angelo State	1361	123.7
Incarnate Word	1279	116.3
Abilene Christian	900	81.8
Texas A&M–Commerce	705	70.5

Rushing Defense

Teams	Yards	Avg/g
Texas A&M–Kingsville	1481	123.4
West Texas A&M	2032	135.5
Tarleton State	1378	137.8
Angelo State	1644	149.5
Midwestern State	1644	149.5
Abilene Christian	1748	158.9
Incarnate Word	1800	163.6
Eastern New Mexico	1918	191.8
Texas A&M–Commerce	1927	192.7

Pass Offense

Teams	Yards	Avg/g
West Texas A&M	4980	332.0
Tarleton State	2864	286.4
Abilene Christian	2997	272.5
Texas A&M–Kingsville	3171	264.2
Angelo State	2624	238.5
Texas A&M–Commerce	1970	197.0
Incarnate Word	1722	156.5
Eastern New Mexico	1430	143.0
Midwestern State	1486	135.1

Pass Defense

Teams	Yards	Avg/g
Texas A&M–Commerce	1803	180.3
Angelo State	2062	187.5
West Texas A&M	3212	214.1
Incarnate Word	2376	216.0
Tarleton State	2226	222.6
Midwestern State	2451	222.8
Texas A&M–Kingsville	2761	230.1
Eastern New Mexico	2418	241.8
Abilene Christian	2804	254.9

Pass Efficiency

Teams	Comp.	Effic.
West Texas A&M	393	158.3
Abilene Christian	230	139.9
Tarleton State	255	134.1
Texas A&M–Kingsville	255	128.7
Eastern New Mexico	118	128.1
Angelo State	223	127.3
Midwestern State	123	112.4
Incarnate Word	191	104.4
Texas A&M–Commerce	185	103.8

Pass Defence Efficiency

Teams	Comp.	Effic.
West Texas A&M	274	122.5
Angelo State	165	123.8
Texas A&M–Kingsville	230	124.1
Midwestern State	212	125.4
Abilene Christian	280	127.1
Texas A&M–Commerce	159	127.2
Tarleton State	189	128.9
Incarnate Word	204	136.1
Eastern New Mexico	185	154.5

Kickoff Returns

Teams	TD	Avg
Abilene Christian	1	24.1
West Texas A&M	0	21.9
Tarleton State	0	20.3
Incarnate Word	1	20.3
Angelo State	0	18.4
Texas A&M–Kingsville	1	18.3
Midwestern State	0	18.0
Texas A&M–Commerce	0	16.7
Eastern New Mexico	0	16.1

Punt Returns

Teams	TD	Avg
Abilene Christian	0	25.2
Midwestern State	0	13.0
West Texas A&M	2	11.3
Tarleton State	0	10.4
Texas A&M–Kingsville	0	8.7
Angelo State	1	7.9
Eastern New Mexico	0	7.0
Texas A&M–Commerce	0	5.6
Incarnate Word	0	4.0

Interceptions

Teams	TD	Number
Abilene Christian	2	12
Incarnate Word	1	11
West Texas A&M	1	11
Texas A&M–Kingsville	0	11
Midwestern State	2	10
Eastern New Mexico	1	10
Angelo State	1	9
Tarleton State	0	6
Texas A&M–Commerce	0	5

Punting

Teams	TB	Net/P
Midwestern State	0	36.2
Abilene Christian	4	35.9
Texas A&M–Kingsville	8	35.0
Texas A&M–Commerce	6	34.4
Incarnate Word	1	33.9
Angelo State	4	33.9
Tarleton State	3	33.5
West Texas A&M	5	32.8
Eastern New Mexico	1	10

Field Goals

Teams	Made	Att	PC
West Texas A&M	20	23	87.0
Incarnate Word	11	13	84.6
Tarleton State	18	22	81.8
Texas A&M–Kingsville	17	23	73.9
Abilene Christian	13	19	68.4
Midwestern State	9	14	64.3
Eastern New Mexico	5	8	62.5
Texas A&M–Commerce	6	11	54.5
Angelo State	7	13	53.8

Pat Kicking

Teams	Made	Att	PC
Tarleton State	39	39	100
West Texas A&M	69	70	98.6
Midwestern State	56	57	98.2
Angelo State	33	34	97.1
Texas A&M–Commerce	12	13	92.3
Incarnate Word	19	21	90.5
Abilene Christian	36	40	90.0
Eastern New Mexico	23	26	88.5
Texas A&M–Kingsville	31	37	83.8

Sacks by

Teams	Games	Sacks
West Texas A&M	15	59
Texas A&M–Kingsville	12	30
Tarleton State	10	29
Abilene Christian	11	26
Incarnate Word	11	26
Midwestern State	11	22
Angelo State	11	22
Texas A&M–Commerce	10	15
Eastern New Mexico	10	14

Sacks against

Teams	Games	Sacks
Midwestern State	11	4
Tarleton State	10	15
Angelo State	11	21
West Texas A&M	15	22
Texas A&M–Kingsville	12	23
Eastern New Mexico	10	30
Abilene Christian	11	39
Texas A&M–Commerce	10	39
Incarnate Word	11	46

First Downs

Teams	Total	Avg/G
Tarleton State	258	25.8
Midwestern State	258	23.5
West Texas A&M	342	22.8
Angelo State	225	20.5
Texas A&M–Kingsville	243	20.2
Abilene Christian	216	19.6
Eastern New Mexico	196	19.6
Incarnate Word	175	15.9
Texas A&M–Commerce	157	15.7

Opponents First Downs

Teams	Total	Avg/G
Texas A&M–Kingsville	224	18.7
Angelo State	208	18.9
Incarnate Word	218	19.8
Tarleton State	200	20.0
West Texas A&M	307	20.5
Texas A&M–Commerce	206	20.6
Eastern New Mexico	208	20.8
Midwestern State	235	21.4
Abilene Christian	258	23.5

Attendance

Teams	Avg/G	%
West Texas A&M	10,379	42%
Texas A&M–Kingsville	8,427	56%
Abilene Christian	6,615	44%
Midwestern State	6,541	45%
Angelo State	6,243	110%
Tarleton State	5,449	78%
Incarnate Word	3,076	51%
Eastern New Mexico	3,033	58%
Texas A&M–Commerce	2,355	20%
