= Emporia State–Washburn football rivalry =

American college football rivalry

- Emporia State Hornets Washburn Ichabods
- Sport: Football
- First meeting: November 4, 1899; Emporia State, 11–0
- Latest meeting: November 7, 2026; Washburn, 20–19
- Next meeting: 2027

Statistics
- Total meetings: 122
- All-time series: Emporia State leads, 62–54–6
- Largest victory: Emporia State, 45–7 (1980)
- Longest win streak: Emporia State, 11 (1991–2001)
- Current win streak: Washburn, 1 (2026–present)

Locations in Kansas
Locations of Emporia State and Washburn

The Emporia State–Washburn football rivalry, commonly referred to as the Turnpike Tussle, is an American college football rivalry game played annually between the Emporia State Hornets football team of Emporia State University from Emporia, Kansas, and the Washburn Ichabods football team of Washburn University from Topeka, Kansas. Both schools currently compete in the NCAA Division II level, and are members of the Mid-America Intercollegiate Athletics Association (MIAA). Emporia State currently leads the series 62–54–6. The Turnpike Tussle is the second-oldest active NCAA Division II rivalry.

Prior to joining the MIAA (Washburn in 1989, Emporia State 1991), both schools have competed in the same conferences with the exception of 1935 to 1940 when Washburn was a member of the Missouri Valley Conference.

== History ==
Emporia State University opened its doors in 1863 as the Kansas State Normal School, with Washburn University opening its doors two years later in 1865 as the Lincoln College. Washburn's football program began in 1891 and Emporia State began two years later, with the first football game between the two schools taking place on November 4, 1899, in Topeka where Emporia State won 11–0. After a one-year hiatus, the rivalry began again playing annually until 1942 when World War II took place. During those 42 seasons, Washburn started out with a strong lead in the series winning eight of the next nine games before Emporia State took the majority of the wins those years. The teams tied six times prior to WWII.

Ten years after World War II finished, the Kansas Turnpike was completed, forming a 58 mile distance between the two schools and led the two schools to name their rivalry series the "Turnpike Tussle" in 1956. The series winning streaks began alternating around every five years or so after the War until 1991 when Emporia State began the longest winning streak in the series – 11 games from 1991 to 2001. The turn of the century brought new leadership for both teams. In 2001, Emporia State promoted offensive coordinator Dave Wiemers as their head coach, who later resigned in December 2006. On December 28, 2001, Washburn hired Craig Schurig as the next head coach, who remains the head coach. In December 2006, former ESU quarterback, Garin Higgins, was named the next Hornet football coach, who remains as the head coach.

== Game results ==
Emporia State victories	Washburn victories	Tie games

No.	Date	Location	Winner	Score
1	November 4, 1899	Topeka	Kansas State Normal	11–0
2	September 21, 1901	Topeka	Washburn	6–0
3	October 6, 1902	Emporia	Washburn	6–0
4	October 3, 1903	Emporia	Tie	0–0
5	October 8, 1904	Topeka	Washburn	21–0
6	October 7, 1905	Topeka	Washburn	29–6
7	October 6, 1906	Topeka	Washburn	6–0
8	October 5, 1907	Emporia	Washburn	18–0
9	October 3, 1908	Topeka	Washburn	6–0
10	October 9, 1909	Topeka	Washburn	24–6
11	October 22, 1910	Topeka	Kansas State Normal	14–12
12	November 11, 1911	Topeka	Washburn	8–0
13	November 2, 1912	Topeka	Kansas State Normal	7–6
14	November 1, 1913	Topeka	Washburn	41–7
15	October 31, 1914	Topeka	Kansas State Normal	19–0
16	October 30, 1915	Topeka	Tie	0–0
17	November 3, 1916	Emporia	Kansas State Normal	23–7
18	November 3, 1917	Topeka	Tie	0–0
19	November 15, 1918	Emporia	Washburn	22–3
20	November 8, 1919	Topeka	Washburn	20–6
21	November 6, 1920	Topeka	Tie	7–7
22	November 5, 1921	Topeka	Washburn	10–7
23	November 3, 1922	Emporia	Kansas State Normal	34–0
24	November 10, 1923	Topeka	Tie	7–7
25	November 7, 1924	Emporia	KSTC Emporia	18–0
26	November 7, 1925	Emporia	KSTC Emporia	6–0
27	November 5, 1926	Topeka	KSTC Emporia	35–0
28	November 4, 1927	Topeka	KSTC Emporia	20–7
29	November 2, 1928	Emporia	KSTC Emporia	45–6
30	November 2, 1929	Topeka	Washburn	6–2
31	October 31, 1930	Emporia	Washburn	13–6
32	October 30, 1931	Topeka	Washburn	20–7
33	October 28, 1932	Emporia	Tie	0–0
34	November 3, 1933	Topeka	KSTC Emporia	7–6
35	October 26, 1934	Emporia	KSTC Emporia	14–6
36	September 27, 1935	Topeka	Washburn	12–7
37	October 9, 1936	Topeka	KSTC Emporia	14–7
38	September 24, 1937	Topeka	KSTC Emporia	12–6
39	September 30, 1938	Topeka	Washburn	19–6
40	September 30, 1939	Emporia	Washburn	12–0
41	October 4, 1940	Topeka	KSTC Emporia	38–7
42	October 3, 1941	Topeka	KSTC Emporia	20–12
43	October 2, 1942	Emporia	KSTC Emporia	12–0
44	October 4, 1946	Topeka	Washburn	20–12
45	October 4, 1947	Emporia	KSTC Emporia	12–6
46	October 1, 1948	Topeka	KSTC Emporia	17–0
47	October 1, 1949	Emporia	KSTC Emporia	19–14
48	September 29, 1950	Topeka	KSTC Emporia	27–19
49	September 29, 1951	Emporia	Washburn	14–13
50	September 26, 1952	Topeka	KSTC Emporia	7–6
51	September 26, 1953	Emporia	Washburn	21–0
52	October 8, 1954	Topeka	Washburn	14–6
53	October 8, 1955	Emporia	Washburn	26–6
54	October 5, 1956	Topeka	Washburn	34–6
55	October 12, 1957	Emporia	Washburn	25–0
56	October 11, 1958	Topeka	KSTC Emporia	27–6
57	October 10, 1959	Emporia	KSTC Emporia	24–13
58	October 14, 1960	Topeka	KSTC Emporia	7–6
59	October 13, 1961	Emporia	KSTC Emporia	26–10
60	October 13, 1962	Topeka	Washburn	7–6
61	October 12, 1963	Emporia	Washburn	32–6
62	November 14, 1964	Topeka	Washburn	19–6

No.	Date	Location	Winner	Score
63	November 13, 1965	Emporia	Washburn	21–0
64	September 10, 1966	Emporia	KSTC Emporia	14–0
65	November 12, 1966	Topeka	KSTC Emporia	12–6
66	November 11, 1967	Emporia	KSTC Emporia	34–7
67	November 9, 1968	Topeka	KSTC Emporia	47–19
68	November 8, 1969	Emporia	KSTC Emporia	28–14
69	November 7, 1970	Emporia	Washburn	34–21
70	November 6, 1971	Topeka	KSTC Emporia	3–0
71	November 11, 1972	Emporia	KSTC Emporia	41–7
72	November 10, 1973	Emporia	Washburn	20–10
73	October 5, 1974	Emporia	Washburn	36–15
74	October 4, 1975	Topeka	Washburn	42–13
75	October 9, 1976	Emporia	Washburn	21–0
76	October 1, 1977	Topeka	Washburn	40–12
77	September 30, 1978	Emporia	Washburn	17–7
78	September 29, 1979	Topeka	Emporia State	17–11
79	September 27, 1980	Emporia	Emporia State	45–7
80	October 10, 1981	Topeka	Washburn	17–10
81	October 8, 1982	Topeka	Emporia State	20–13
82	October 1, 1983	Emporia	Washburn	41–7
83	September 29, 1984	Emporia	Emporia State	14–0
84	October 5, 1985	Topeka	Washburn	25–18
85	October 4, 1986	Emporia	Emporia State	22–16
86	November 14, 1987	Emporia	Washburn	28–21
87	November 12, 1988	Topeka	Washburn	59–46
88	October 12, 1991	Emporia	Emporia State	49–18
89	October 10, 1992	Topeka	Emporia State	25–18
90	November 6, 1993	Emporia	Emporia State	37–19
91	November 5, 1994	Topeka	Emporia State	43–7
92	September 30, 1995	Emporia	Emporia State	25–24
93	October 5, 1996	Topeka	Emporia State	40–35
94	October 30, 1997	Emporia	Emporia State	64–35
95	October 29, 1998	Topeka	Emporia State	35–21
96	November 13, 1999	Emporia	Emporia State	45–20
97	November 11, 2000	Topeka	Emporia State	35–21
98	October 27, 2001	Emporia	Emporia State	38–19
99	November 2, 2002	Topeka	Washburn	34–21
100	September 20, 2003	Emporia	Emporia State	35–28^{OT}
101	September 11, 2004	Topeka	Washburn	28–10
102	October 22, 2005	Emporia	Washburn	42–14
103	October 28, 2006	Topeka	Washburn	37–6
104	October 13, 2007	Emporia	Washburn	31–21
105	October 1, 2008	Topeka	Washburn	14–6
106	November 7, 2009	Emporia	Washburn	56–35
107	November 6, 2010	Topeka	Washburn	42–0
108	October 1, 2011	Emporia	Washburn	31–17
109	November 10, 2012	Topeka	Emporia State	55–23
110	November 16, 2013	Emporia	Emporia State	34–23
111	November 1, 2014	Topeka	Washburn	36–10
112	October 31, 2015	Emporia	Emporia State	47–21
113	November 12, 2016	Topeka	Emporia State	30–3
114	November 11, 2017	Emporia	Emporia State	26–20
115	October 27, 2018	Topeka	Emporia State	34–31^{OT}
116	November 2, 2019	Topeka	Washburn	37–17
117	October 2, 2021	Emporia	Emporia State	35–30
118	October 1, 2022	Topeka	Emporia State	42–35
119	October 14, 2023	Emporia	Emporia State	38–23
120	August 29, 2024	Emporia	Emporia State	30–14
121	November 8, 2025	Topeka	Emporia State	45–17
122	November 7, 2026	Topeka	Washburn	20–19
Series: Emporia State leads 62–54–6

== See also ==
- List of NCAA college football rivalry games
