= Paul Samson (swimmer) =

American swimmer (1905–1982)

Personal information
- Full name: Paul Curkeet Samson
- National team: United States
- Born: June 12, 1905 Emporia, Kansas, U.S.
- Died: February 10, 1982 (aged 76) Oakland, California, U.S.

Sport
- Sport: Swimming
- Strokes: Freestyle, water polo
- Club: Illinois Athletic Club
- College team: University of Michigan

Paul Curkeet Samson (June 12, 1905 – February 10, 1982) was an American cardiothoracic surgeon and competition swimmer who represented the United States at the 1928 Summer Olympics in Amsterdam, Netherlands. Samson was born in Emporia, Kansas.

== Swimming ==
He enrolled in the University of Michigan and swam for the Michigan Wolverines swimming and diving team in National Collegiate Athletic Association (NCAA) competition. In 1927, he won the NCAA national championships in the 220-yard freestyle (2:26.6) and the 440-yard freestyle (5:28.7).

Samson swam for the first-place U.S. team in the qualifying heats of the men's 4×200-meter freestyle relay. Because he did not swim in the relay event final he was not eligible to receive a medal under the 1928 Olympic rules. He was also a member of the fourth-place U.S. water polo team.

== Medicine ==
Samson was a prominent cardiac and thoracic surgeon in California. In 1946 he founded the thoracic and cardiac surgery training program at Highland Hospital, and later became the chief of surgery at the hospital at Samuel Merritt University. He also taught on the faculty at Stanford University School of Medicine.

== See also ==
- List of University of Michigan alumni
- List of University of Michigan sporting alumni
- World record progression 4 × 200 metres freestyle relay
