= Ron Blaylock =

American football player and coach (born 1939)

Biographical details
- Born: May 27, 1939 (age 86); Emporia, Kansas, U.S.

Playing career
- 1959–1960: Kansas State
- Position(s): Quarterback

Coaching career (HC unless noted)
- 1961–1962: Emporia State (backfield)
- 1963–1965: Yankton
- 1966: Emporia State (assistant)
- 1967–1968: Emporia State

Head coaching record
- Overall: 19–25–2

Ronald Dean Blaylock (born May 27, 1939) is an American former football coach. He served the head football coach at Yankton College in Yankton, South Dakota from 1962 to 1965 and Kansas State Teachers College—now known as Emporia State University—in Emporia, Kansas from 1967 to 1968, compiling a career college football coaching record of 19–25–2.

Blaylock played college football as quarterback at Kansas State University, lettering in 1959 and 1960. He began his coaching career at Emporia State as backfield coach under Keith Caywood while earning his master's degree.

Blaylock was married to Virginia Kay Blaylock, who died in 2006.

== Head coaching record ==
Year	Team	Overall	Conference	Standing	Bowl/playoffs
Yankton Greyhounds (Tri-State Conference) (1963–1965)
1963	Yankton	1–8	1–5	6th	
1964	Yankton	5–4	4–2	T–2nd	
1965	Yankton	7–2	4–2	3rd	
Yankton:		13–14	9–9		
Emporia State Hornets (Central Intercollegiate Conference) (1967–1968)
1967	Emporia State	1–9	1–3	4th	
1968	Emporia State	5–2–2	2–1–1	T–2nd	
Emporia State:		6–11–2	3–4–1		
Total:		19–25–2			
