= Mark Ribaudo =

American football player and coach

Current position
- Title: Defensive coordinator
- Team: Frenship HS (TX)

Biographical details
- Born: c. 1966

Playing career
- c. 1984: Hastings
- Positions: Cornerback, running back

Coaching career (HC unless noted)
- 1985–1987: Sabino HS (AZ) (assistant)
- 1988–1989: Amphitheater HS (AZ) (assistant)
- 1991: Midwestern State (assistant)
- 1992–1996: West Texas A&M (assistant)
- 1997–2004: Eastern New Mexico (assistant)
- 2005–2011: Eastern New Mexico
- 2012–2016: Abilene Christian (assistant)
- 2017–present: Frenship HS (TX) (DC)

Head coaching record
- Overall: 25–51

Mark Ribaudo (born c. 1966) is an American football coach and former player. He is currently the defensive coordinator at Frenship High School in Wolfforth, Texas. Ribaudo served as head football coach at Eastern New Mexico University from 2005 to 2011. He took over the program from longtime coach Harold Elliott after serving as an assistant coach under Elliott at Eastern New Mexico for eight years.

== Life outside football ==
=== Adademic awards ===
Ribaudo was the recipient of the 2006 "Spirit of Eastern Award" - given to an Eastern NMU faculty or staff member that "exemplifies many of the positive traits found at Eastern New Mexico University." The recipient of the award is expected to "support ENMU's teacher-learning mission, show campus community spirit, display a strong work ethic, care about the institution as a whole, show a commitment to all areas affecting student life, and demonstrate a track record in their position."

=== Theatre ===
Ribaudo has been known to support the college theater program, even going so far as to be cast in the role of Egeus in Eastern's 2006 production of A Midsummer Night's Dream.

=== Community action ===
Ribaudo and his team are known for outstanding community action. During a local flood in 2006, Ribaudo and the Eastern New Mexico football team volunteered to help the community by filling sandbags for the citizens to prevent their homes from flooding.

== Personal life ==
Ribaudo received a bachelor's degree in Exercise and Sports Science from the University of Arizona in 1988 and received a master's degree in Physical Education from Midwestern State University in 1992. He lives in Abilene, Texas with his wife and children.

== Head coaching record ==
| Year | Team | Overall | Conference | Standing | Bowl/playoffs |
|---|---|---|---|---|---|
Eastern New Mexico Greyhounds (Lone Star Conference) (2005–2011)
| 2005 | Eastern New Mexico | 5–6 | 4–5 / 2–4 | T–8th / T–5th (South) | |
| 2006 | Eastern New Mexico | 3–7 | 2–7 / 1–5 | T–10th / 6th (South) | |
| 2007 | Eastern New Mexico | 5–6 | 3–6 / 0–6 | 8th / 7th (South) | |
| 2008 | Eastern New Mexico | 2–9 | 1–8 / 0–6 | T–11th / 7th (South) | |
| 2009 | Eastern New Mexico | 3–8 | 2–7 / 0–6 | T–10th / 7th (South) | |
| 2010 | Eastern New Mexico | 5–6 | 4–6 / 3–3 | 10th / T–3rd (North) | |
| 2011 | Eastern New Mexico | 2–9 | 1–7 | T–8th | |
| Eastern New Mexico: | | 25–51 | 17–37 | | |
| Total: | | 25–51 | | | |
