= Jim Lance =

American football player and coach (1931–2016)

Biographical details
- Born: April 21, 1931; Evansville, Indiana, U.S.
- Died: February 25, 2016 (aged 84)

Playing career
- 1956–1957: Murray State

Coaching career (HC unless noted)
- 1959–1960: Vero Beach HS (FL) (B team)
- 1965–1968: Emporia State (assistant)
- 1969–1970: Emporia State
- 1973–1974: Texas A&I (assistant)

Head coaching record
- Overall: 7–11

James E. Lance (April 21, 1931 – February 25, 2016) was an American football coach. He was the 16th head football coach at Kansas State Teachers College—now known as Emporia State University—in Emporia, Kansas, serving for two seasons, from 1969 to 1970, and compiling a record of record of 7–11.

Lance was born April 21, 1931, in Evansville, Indiana. After serving in the United States Navy during the Korean War, Lance graduated from Murray State University in 1959 with a Bachelor of Science. He earned a master's degree in education from the University of Mississippi in 1974, and a Ph.D. in physiology from the University of Southern Mississippi in 1974. Lance died on February 25, 2016, from Parkinson's disease.

== Head coaching record ==
| Year | Team | Overall | Conference | Standing | Bowl/playoffs |
|---|---|---|---|---|---|
Emporia State Hornets (Rocky Mountain Athletic Conference) (1969–1970)
| 1969 | Emporia State | 6–3 | 4–2 | 2nd (Plains) | |
| 1970 | Emporia State | 1–8 | 1–4 | T–5th (Plains) | |
| Emporia State: | | 7–11 | 5–6 | | |
| Total: | | 7–11 | | | |
