= Horace Botsford =

American football coach

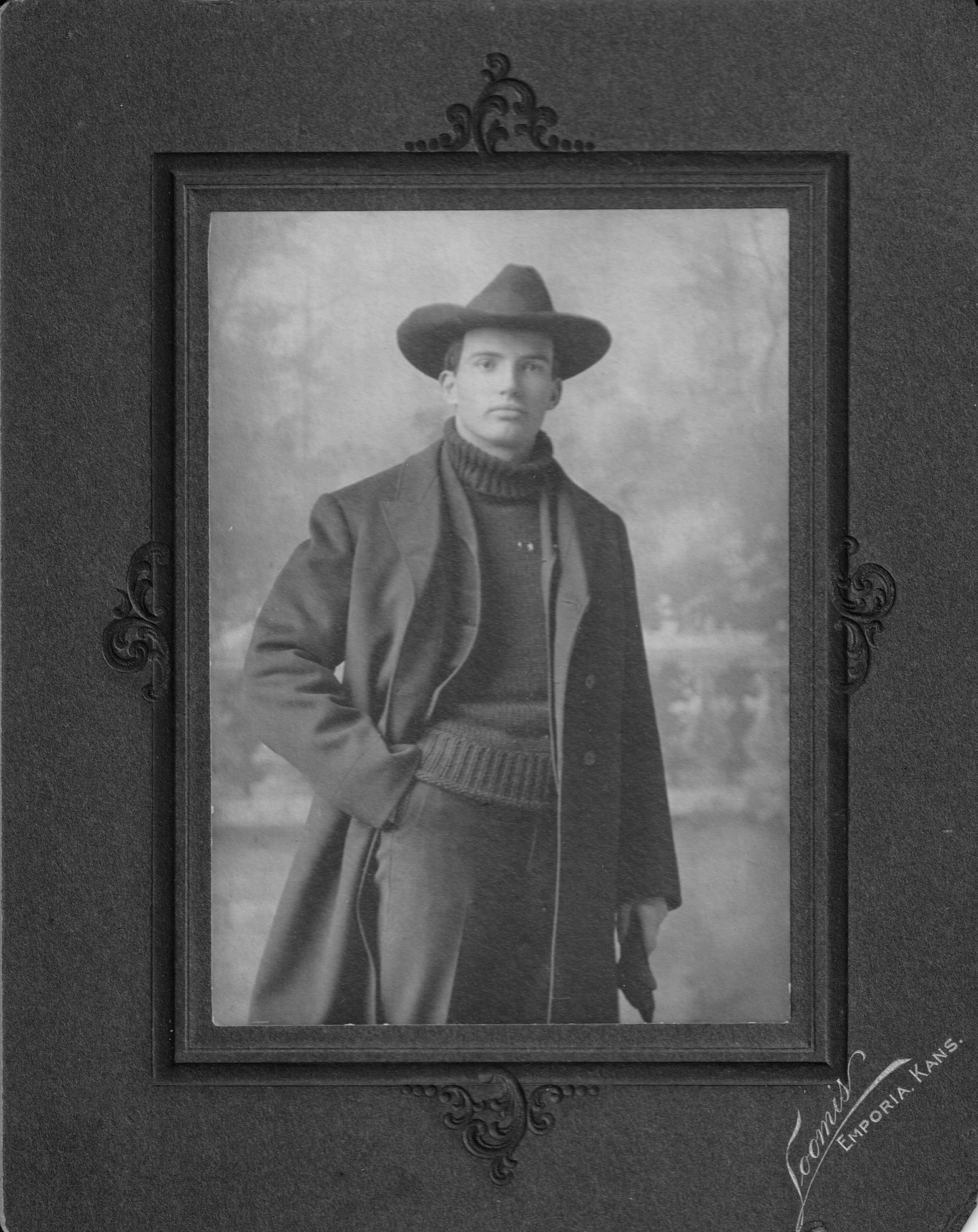

Biographical details
- Born: November 28, 1877; Miami Township, Ohio, U.S.
- Died: March 26, 1948 (aged 70); Kansas City, Missouri, U.S.

Coaching career (HC unless noted)
- 1901: College of Emporia
- 1902–1903: Kansas State Normal

Head coaching record
- Overall: 11–13–3

Horace Casad Botsford Sr. (November 28, 1877 – March 26, 1948) was an American college football coach.

== Coaching career ==
=== College of Emporia ===
Botsford was the first head coach at the College of Emporia in Emporia, Kansas. He held the post for the 1901 season only and posted a record of 4–3. The school played 11 seasons without an official coach before Botsford was hired.

=== Kansas State Normal ===
After one year at College of Emporia, Botsford moved across town to become the third head coach at Kansas State Normal School—now known as Emporia State University. He held that position for two seasons, from 1902 until 1903. His coaching record at Kansas State Normal was 7–10–3.
