= Missouri-Kansas Bowl =

Missouri-Kansas Bowl (defunct)
- Location: Kansas City, Missouri
- Operated: 1948
- Conference tie-ins: NAIA

The Missouri-Kansas Bowl was a National Association of Intercollegiate Athletics postseason college football bowl game played in Kansas City, Missouri for the 1948 season.

The game was the first postseason appearance for Emporia State. Southwest Missouri State achieved their bowl bid by winning their conference that year.

== Game result ==
Year	Winner		Loser	
1948	Emporia State	34	Southwest Missouri State	20
