= Keith Caywood =

American football player and coach (1919–1992)

Biographical details
- Born: February 19, 1919; Kansas, U.S.
- Died: October 20, 1992 (aged 73); Las Cruces, New Mexico, U.S.

Playing career
- 1938–1941: Emporia State
- 1943: Fort Riley
- Position(s): Halfback

Coaching career (HC unless noted)
- 1946–1954: Emporia State (backfield)
- 1955–1966: Emporia State

Head coaching record
- Overall: 24–80–5
- Bowls: 0–1

Keith E. Caywood (February 19, 1919 – October 20, 1992) was an American football coach. He served as the 14th head football coach at Kansas State Teachers College—now known as Emporia State University—in Emporia, Kansas and held that position for 12 seasons, from 1955 until 1966, compiling a record of 24–80–5. Caywood was the backfield coach at Emporia State under Fran Welch from 1946 to 1954.

Caywood died at Las Cruces, New Mexico in 1992.

== Head coaching record ==
Year	Team	Overall	Conference	Standing	Bowl/playoffs
Emporia State Hornets (Central Intercollegiate Conference) (1955–1966)
1955	Emporia State	0–10	0–5	6th	
1956	Emporia State	2–6–1	1–4	5th	
1957	Emporia State	2–7	1–3	5th	
1958	Emporia State	5–4–1	2–2–1	T–3rd	L Mineral Water
1959	Emporia State	2–7	2–3	T–3rd	
1960	Emporia State	3–5	2–3	T–3rd	
1961	Emporia State	1–8	1–4	5th	
1962	Emporia State	3–5–1	2–3	T–4th	
1963	Emporia State	2–5–2	0–3–1	5th	
1964	Emporia State	0–9	0–4	5th	
1965	Emporia State	1–8	0–4	5th	
1966	Emporia State	3–6	2–2	3rd	
Emporia State:		24–80–5	12–40–2		
Total:		24–80–5			
