= Fran Welch =

American football coach (1895–1970)

Biographical details
- Born: August 21, 1895; Hartford, Kansas, U.S.
- Died: June 19, 1970 (aged 74); Kansas City, Kansas, U.S.

Playing career

Football
- 1914–1917: Kansas State Normal
- Position: Quarterback

Coaching career (HC unless noted)

Football
- 1928–1942: Emporia Teachers / Emporia State
- 1943: Fort Riley
- 1946–1954: Emporia State

Administrative career (AD unless noted)
- 1927–1962: Emporia Teachers / Emporia State

Head coaching record
- Overall: 122–83–16
- Bowls: 1–0

Accomplishments and honors

Awards
- Kansas Sports Hall of Fame; NAIA Track & Field Hall of Fame

Francis George Welch (August 21, 1895 – June 19, 1970) was an American football player and coach, track and field coach, and college athletics administrator. He was of the first three coaches to be selected for the National Association of Intercollegiate Athletics Track and Field Hall of Fame and is a member of the Kansas Sports Hall of Fame.

In 1960, Emporia State University named the football stadium Francis G. Welch Stadium to honor his legacy.

== Playing career ==
Welch enrolled in Kansas State Normal School (now Emporia State University) in 1914. Head football coach Homer Woodson Hargiss put him at quarterback where he remained until graduation four years later. He also displayed skill in baseball and basketball, earning 11 varsity letters before his graduation in 1918.

== Coaching career ==
=== Football ===
Welch was the 13th head football coach for Emporia State University in Emporia, Kansas and he held that position for 24 seasons, from 1928 until 1954. Emporia State, like many schools, did not play football during World War II. His overall coaching record at Emporia State was 115–82–15.

Welch led his team to a victory in the Missouri-Kansas Bowl with a 34–20 victory over Missouri State University on December 4, 1948 in Kansas City, Missouri. It was the only year the bowl game was played. It was Emporia's first post-season football game.

Welch (along with Washburn University coach Dick Godlove) also coached an "all-star" team made up of Kansas players to play a similar squad from Missouri in the "Mo-Kan Bowl" all-star exhibition game.

=== Track and field ===
Welch coached the track and field teams at Emporia as well. His teams were conference champs ten times, won four NAIA championships and placed second three times in 13 years of competition. Fran developed three NCAA individual champions and 13 individual NAIA champs.

In 1960, Welch was selected to coach field event participants of the United States Women's Track and Field Team for the 1960 Summer Olympics in Rome.

== Personal life ==
Welch was awarded a Bachelor of Science in education in 1918 from Kansas Normal, then completed requirements for a degree in agriculture at Kansas State University in Manhattan, Kansas. He served as a United States Army lieutenant in World War I and took a leave of absence from teaching to serve in World War II as a captain and special services officer at Fort Riley.

== Head coaching record ==
Year	Team	Overall	Conference	Standing	Bowl/playoffs
Emporia Teachers / Emporia State Hornets (Central Intercollegiate Conference) (1927–1942)
1928	Emporia Teachers	6–1–1	4–1–1	2nd	
1929	Emporia Teachers	6–2	5–1	1st	
1930	Emporia Teachers	4–2–3	2–1–3	3rd	
1931	Emporia Teachers	4–4	4–2	3rd	
1932	Emporia Teachers	2–5–1	0–5–1	7th	
1933	Emporia Teachers	3–5–1	2–4	5th	
1934	Emporia Teachers	7–2	3–2	T–2nd	
1935	Emporia Teachers	4–4	1–3	4th	
1936	Emporia Teachers	6–4	2–2	3rd	
1937	Emporia State	5–2–2	3–1	2nd	
1938	Emporia State	3–6	1–3	4th	
1939	Emporia State	6–3	3–2	T–2nd	
1940	Emporia State	6–2	3–1	2nd	
1941	Emporia State	4–3–2	2–1–1	T–2nd	
1942	Emporia State	3–4–1	2–2–1	T–3rd	
Fort Riley Centaurs (Independent) (1943)
1943	Fort Riley	6–2–1			
Fort Riley:		6–2–1			
Emporia State Hornets (Central Intercollegiate Conference) (1946–1954)
1946	Emporia State	4–5	1–4	6th	
1947	Emporia State	7–1–1	4–0–1	1st	
1948	Emporia State	8–2	5–0	1st	W Missouri-Kansas Bowl
1949	Emporia State	6–4	4–2	T–3rd	
1950	Emporia State	6–2–1	5–0	1st	
1951	Emporia State	5–3–1	5–0	T–1st	
1952	Emporia State	7–3	5–1	1st	
1953	Emporia State	2–5–1	2–3	5th	
1954	Emporia State	2–7	2–3	T–4th	
Emporia Teachers / Emporia State:		116–81–15	70–44–8		
Total:		122–83–16			
National championship Conference title Conference division title or championship game berth
