= Paul Samson (American football) =

American football coach

Biographical details
- Born: December 2, 1879; Corydon, Iowa, U.S.
- Died: November 11, 1967 (aged 87); Pellston, Michigan, U.S.

Coaching career (HC unless noted)
- 1904–1906: Kansas State Normal
- 1908: Kansas State Normal

Head coaching record
- Overall: 16–16

Paul Bryant Samson (December 2, 1879 – November 11, 1967) was the fourth and sixth head football coach for Emporia State University in Emporia, Kansas and he held that position for four seasons, from 1904 until 1906 and then returning in 1908. His overall coaching record at ESU was 16–16. This ranks him eighth at ESU in terms of total wins and ninth at ESU in terms of winning percentage.
