= Harold Elliott (American football) =

American football coach

- Elliott, c. 2000

Biographical details
- Born: December 24, 1931; Miami County, Kansas, U.S.
- Died: November 1, 2005 (aged 73); Lubbock, Texas, U.S.

Playing career

Basketball
- 1949–1952: Baker

Track and field
- 1949–1952: Baker

Coaching career (HC unless noted)

Football
- 1953–1954: Turon HS (KS)
- 1955–1957: Geneseo HS (KS)
- 1958–1959: Mulvane HS (KS)
- 1960–1963: Turner HS (KS)
- 1964–1968: Southwestern (KS)
- 1969–1970: Washburn
- 1971–1973: Emporia State
- 1974–1983: UT Arlington
- 1988–1993: Northwest Missouri State
- 1994–2004: Eastern New Mexico

Head coaching record
- Overall: 205–179–9 (college)
- Bowls: 0–1
- Tournaments: 0–1 (NCAA D-II playoffs)

Accomplishments and honors

Championships
- 3 KCAC (1964, 1967–1968); 2 GPAC (1972–1973); 1 Southland (1981); 3 Lone Star South Division (1999–2000, 2004)

Awards
- 2× GPAC Coach of the Year; 2× NAIA Area III Coach of the Year; 4× NAIA District 10 Coach of the Year

Harold Edward "Bud" Elliott (December 24, 1931 – November 1, 2005) was an American football coach. He served as the head coach at Southwestern College in Winfield, Kansas (1964–1968), Washburn University (1969–1970), Kansas State Teachers College—now known as Emporia State University (1971–1973), the University of Texas at Arlington (1974–1983), Northwest Missouri State University (1988–1993), and Eastern New Mexico University (1994–2004), compiling a career college football record of 205–179–9. Elliott won more games than any other head coach in the history of Eastern New Mexico Greyhounds football program. He coached football at high school and collegiate levels for over 40 years. In his last season of coaching in 2004, Elliott became the 46th head coach in NCAA football history to reach 200 wins. At the time of his retirement, he ranked third in victories among active NCAA Division II coaches.

== Early life and education ==
Elliott was born on December 24, 1931, in Miami County, Kansas, to Ellis Lucille (née Aiken) and Harold Francis Elliott. He was raised in Drexel, Missouri, and graduated from Drexel High School. Elliott received his bachelor's degree in physical education from Baker University in 1953 and later earned a master's degree in school administration from Wichita State University in 1963.

Elliott did not participate in football as a player, but did participate in basketball and track & field at Baker. In 1990, he was inducted into the Baker University Athletic Hall of Fame.

== Coaching career ==
=== High school football ===
Elliott began his football coaching career with 11 years as a high school head coach in Kansas. He coached at Turon High School (1953–1955), Geneseo High School (1955–1958), Mulvane High School (1958–1960) and Kansas City's Turner High School (1960–1964) before moving on to the college level.

=== Southwestern ===
Elliott was the 18th football coach for the Southwestern College in Winfield, Kansas and held that position five seasons, from 1964 to 1968. His overall coaching record at Southwestern was 37–7–3.

=== Washburn ===
Elliott was the 30th head football coach for Washburn University in Topeka, Kansas and he held that position for two seasons, from 1969 until 1970. His overall coaching record at Washburn was 10–8–2. This ranks him 15th at Washburn in terms of total wins and 17th at Washburn in terms of winning percentage.

=== Emporia State ===
Elliott was the 17th head football coach at Emporia State University in Emporia, Kansas for three seasons, 1971 to 1973. In his three years at ESU, Elliott compiled a record of 17–11–1. This ranks him seventh at ESU in terms of total wins and fifth at ESU in terms of winning percentage.

Highlights of his tenure at ESU included an appearance in the 1972 Boot Hill Bowl and opening the 1973 season at 7–0 before dropping last two games. His .583 winning percentage is the fifth best in school history among coaches with at least two years at Emporia State. ESU drew their biggest crowd in school history to a 10–0 win over Northern Colorado in 1973 Coach Elliott.

=== Texas–Arlington ===
Elliott coached at the University of Texas at Arlington from 1974 until 1983. He earned Southland Conference Coach of the Year honors in 1981 after coaching UT-A to the Southland Conference championship. In 1979, he received the Dallas Sports Association Award of Merit and was the runner-up in voting for the Texas Sports Writers' Coach of the Year Award.

Elliott was the 12th head coach for the Mavericks and he held that position for ten seasons. His career coaching record at UT Arlington was 46–64. This ranks him third at UT Arlington in total wins and tenth at UT Arlington in winning percentage. The school discontinued its football team after completion of the 1985 season.

=== Northwest Missouri State ===
Elliott was the 16th head football coach at Northwest Missouri State University for six seasons from 1988 to 1993. During this time, he compiled a record of 27–39–1, with only two winning seasons. However, he did take the Bearcats to the NCAA Division II playoffs in his second season in 1989.

=== Eastern New Mexico ===
Elliott concluded his 37-year collegiate head coaching career in 2004 after 11 seasons at Eastern New Mexico University (ENMU) of the Lone Star Conference. His overall record at Eastern was 68–49–2. The 68 wins were the most by a head coach in the team's history, while his .580 winning percentage ranked sixth at Eastern. He guided the Greyhounds to Lone Star Conference South Division co-championships in 1999 and 2000.

Elliott achieved his 200th NCAA career coaching victory at Eastern New Mexico by shutting out Southwestern Oklahoma State University by a score of 39–0 on September 11, 2004. In his 11 years of coaching at ENMU, his team completed seven consecutive winning seasons and nine winning seasons overall. In 2005, he was succeeded Mark Ribaudo as Eastern New Mexico University's head football coach.

== Head coaching record ==
=== College ===
Year	Team	Overall	Conference	Standing	Bowl/playoffs
Southwestern Moundbuilders (Kansas Collegiate Athletic Conference) (1964–1968)
1964	Southwestern	8–1	7–1	1st	
1965	Southwestern	5–3–1	5–3–1	T–4th	
1966	Southwestern	8–2	7–2	3rd	
1967	Southwestern	9–0–1	9–0	1st	
1968	Southwestern	7–1–1	7–1–1	1st	
Southwestern:		37–7–3	35–7–2		
Washburn Ichabods (Rocky Mountain Athletic Conference) (1969–1970)
1969	Washburn	5–5	3–3	T–4th (Plains)	
1970	Washburn	5–3–2	NA	NA (Plains)	
Washburn:		10–8–2	3–3		
Emporia State Hornets (Great Plains Athletic Conference) (1971)
1971	Emporia State	3–6–1	1–3–1	T–4th (Plains)	
Emporia State Hornets (Great Plains Athletic Conference) (1971–1972)
1972	Emporia State	7–4	5–1	1st	L Boot Hill
1973	Emporia State	7–2	4–1	T–1st	
Emporia State:		17–12–1	10–5–1		
UT Arlington Mavericks (Southland Conference) (1974–1983)
1974	UT Arlington	1–10	1–4	5th	
1975	UT Arlington	4–7	1–4	5th	
1976	UT Arlington	5–6	3–2	3rd	
1977	UT Arlington	5–6	3–2	3rd	
1978	UT Arlington	5–6	3–2	3rd	
1979	UT Arlington	9–2	4–1	2nd	
1980	UT Arlington	3–8	3–2	3rd	
1981	UT Arlington	6–5	4–1	1st	
1982	UT Arlington	3–8	1–4	T–5th	
1983	UT Arlington	5–6	2–4	T–5th	
UT Arlington:		46–64	25–26		
Northwest Missouri State Bearcats (Missouri Intercollegiate Athletics Association / Mid-America Intercollegiate Athletics Association) (1988–1993)
1988	Northwest Missouri State	2–9	2–4	T–4th	
1989	Northwest Missouri State	9–3	8–2	2nd	L NCAA Division II First Round
1990	Northwest Missouri State	2–8–1	2–7	T–8th	
1991	Northwest Missouri State	5–6	4–5	T–6th	
1992	Northwest Missouri State	6–5	6–3	T–3rd	
1993	Northwest Missouri State	3–8	3–6	T–6th	
Northwest Missouri State:		27–39–1	25–27		
Eastern New Mexico Greyhounds (Lone Star Conference) (1994–2004)
1994	Eastern New Mexico	6–4–1	1–3–1	5th	
1995	Eastern New Mexico	6–4–1	3–3–1	5th	
1996	Eastern New Mexico	3–8	2–5	T–6th	
1997	Eastern New Mexico	5–6	3–6	T–6th (South)	
1998	Eastern New Mexico	8–3	6–3	T–3rd (South)	
1999	Eastern New Mexico	8–3	6–3	T–1st (South)	
2000	Eastern New Mexico	6–4	5–3	1st (South)	
2001	Eastern New Mexico	6–4	4–4	T–5th (South)	
2002	Eastern New Mexico	8–3	5–3	T–3rd (South)	
2003	Eastern New Mexico	6–5	3–5	T–4th (South)	
2004	Eastern New Mexico	6–5	5–4	T–1st (South)	
Eastern New Mexico:		68–49–2	43–42–2		
Total:		205–179–9			
National championship Conference title Conference division title or championship game berth

== See also ==
- List of college football career coaching wins leaders
