= Fred A. Williams =

American football player and coach (1878–1962)

Biographical details
- Born: June 13, 1878; Neola, Iowa, U.S.
- Died: January 31, 1962 (aged 83); Salem, Oregon, U.S.
- Education: University of Iowa (1899)

Playing career
- 1898: Iowa

Coaching career (HC unless noted)
- 1900: Iowa State Normal
- 1901: Kansas State Normal
- 1902: Dodge Light Guards
- 1903: Highland Park
- 1904: Creighton

Frederick Almor Williams (June 13, 1878 – January 31, 1962) was an American football coach. He served as the head football coach at Iowa State Normal School—now known as the University of Northern Iowa—in 1900, Kansas State Normal School—now known as Emporia State University—in 1901, Highland Park College in 1903, and Creighton College—now known as Creighton University—in 1904. Williams also coached the Dodge Light Guards of Council Bluffs, Iowa in 1902.

Williams was the second head football coach at Kansas State Normal in Emporia, Kansas, serving for on season, in 1901, and compiling a record of 2–6–1.

Williams was later an attorney in Salem, Oregon. He died on January 31, 1962, in Salem.

== Head coaching record ==
Year	Team	Overall	Conference	Standing	Bowl/playoffs
Iowa State Normal (Independent) (1900)
1900	Iowa State Normal	3–4–1			
Iowa State Normal:		3–4–1			
Kansas State Normal (Independent) (1900)
1901	Kansas State Normal	3–4–1			
Kansas State Normal:		3–4–1			
Creighton Blue and White (Independent) (1904)
1904	Creighton	4–2			
Creighton:		4–2			
Total:					
