= John Lamb (American football) =

American football coach (1873–1955)

Biographical details
- Born: February 16, 1873; Bellefonte, Pennsylvania, U.S.
- Died: March 3, 1955 (aged 82); Frederick, Oklahoma, U.S.

Coaching career (HC unless noted)
- 1900: Kansas State Normal

Head coaching record
- Overall: 5–3–1

John Henderson Lamb (February 16, 1873 – March 3, 1955) was an American college football coach and Presbyterian minister. He was the first head football coach the Kansas State Normal School—now known as Emporia State University—in Emporia, Kansas, serving for one season, in 1900, and compiling a record of 5–3–1. Emporia State's football team began in 1893 but played without an official head coach for the first seven seasons.

Lamb was born on February 16, 1873, in Bellefonte, Pennsylvania, and moved to Kansas with his father to homestead. He graduated from the College of Emporia and later trained at the Princeton Theological Seminary to become a Presbyterian minister. Lamb married Martha Rannek in Jacksonville, Illinois, on May 15, 1902. He died on March 3, 1955, at a hospital in Frederick, Oklahoma.

== Head coaching record ==
Year	Team	Overall	Conference	Standing	Bowl/playoffs
Kansas State Normal (Independent) (1900)
1900	Kansas State Normal	5–3–1			
Kansas State Normal:		5–3–1			
Total:		5–3–1			
