= H. D. McChesney =

American football and basketball coach

Biographical details
- Born: June 12, 1895; Burlington, Iowa, U.S.
- Died: March 12, 1954 (aged 58); Roy, Utah, U.S.

Coaching career (HC unless noted)

Football
- 1918: Kansas State Normal
- 1920–1922: Lawrence

Basketball
- 1916–1917: Kansas State Normal
- 1920–1923: Lawrence

Head coaching record
- Overall: 20–5–1 (football); 28–18 (basketball)

Accomplishments and honors

Championships
- Football; 1 Midwest Conference (1922)

Harlan Disberry McChesney (June 12, 1895 – March 12, 1954) was an American football and basketball coach. He served as the head football coach at Kansas State Normal School—now known as Emporia State University— in 1918 and at Lawrence University in Appleton, Wisconsin from 1920 to 1922, compiling a career college football coaching record of 20–5–1. McChesney was also the head basketball coach at Kansas State Normal for one season, in 1916–17, and at Lawrence from 1920 to 1923, tallying a career college basketball coaching record of 28–18.

McChesney was a veteran of the Iowa National Guard. He died in Utah of a cerebral hemorrhage 1954.

== Head coaching record ==
=== Football ===
Year	Team	Overall	Conference	Standing	Bowl/playoffs
Kansas State Normal (Independent) (1918)
1918	Kansas State Normal	2–2			
Kansas State Normal:		2–2			
Lawrence Vikings (Independent) (1920–1921)
1920	Lawrence	7–1			
1921	Lawrence	5–2			
Lawrence Vikings (Midwest Conference) (1922)
1922	Lawrence	6–0–1	2–0–1	T–1st	
Lawrence:		18–3–1	2–0–1		
Total:		20–5–1			
National championship Conference title Conference division title or championship game berth
