= Dave Wiemers =

American football player and coach (born 1968)

Biographical details
- Born: April 18, 1968 (age 58); Clay Center, Kansas, U.S.

Playing career
- 1987–1988: Dodge City
- 1989–1990: Washburn
- Position: Quarterback

Coaching career (HC unless noted)
- 1992–1993: Pittsburg State (GA)
- 1994–1998: Saginaw Valley (DC)
- 1999–2000: Emporia State (OC)
- 2001–2006: Emporia State
- 2007: Tarleton State (OC)
- 2008–2010: Pittsburg State (DC)
- 2011–2019: Pittsburg State (AHC/DC)
- 2021–2022: Carthage HS (MO) (OC)
- 2023: Webb City HS (MO) (DC)
- 2024: Utah State (sr. def. analyst)

Head coaching record
- Overall: 35–32
- Bowls: 1–0
- Tournaments: 0–1 (NCAA D-II playoffs)

Accomplishments and honors

Championships
- 1 MIAA (2003)

Awards
- MIAA Coach of the Year (2003)

David Wiemers (born April 18, 1968) is an American football coach. Wiemers served as the head football coach at Emporia State University from 2001 to 2006, compiling a record of 35–32. He was the assistant head football coach and defensive coordinator at Pittsburg State University from 2011 to 2019.

== Playing career ==
Wiemers played college football at Dodge City Community College and then at Washburn University in Topeka, Kansas.

== Coaching career ==
Wiemers was the 21st head football coach for Emporia State University in Emporia, Kansas from 2001 until the end of the 2006 season. He led Emporia State to a record of 35 wins and 32 losses in six seasons as head coach after serving as an assistant for two years, becoming the fourth-most winning head coach in the history of the program.

Following a 5–6 record his first season, he led the Hornets to consecutive 9–3 years in 2002 and 2003. The two-year span included a victory in the 2002 Mineral Water Bowl and ESU's first-ever appearance in the NCAA Playoffs in 2003, earning him the MIAA Coach of the Year after the 2003 season.

Wiemers served as the offensive coordinator at Tarleton State University in Stephenville, Texas for the 2007 season.

In 2021, Wiemers was hired as the offensive coordinator for Carthage Senior High School.

== Personal life ==
Dave's brother, Jon Wiemers, is the assistant head coach and offensive line coach for Southeast Missouri State University in Cape Girardeau, Missouri. His sister, Suzie Fritz, was the head volleyball coach at Kansas State University.

== Head coaching record ==
Year	Team	Overall	Conference	Standing	Bowl/playoffs
Emporia State Hornets (Mid-America Intercollegiate Athletics Association) (2001–2006)
2001	Emporia State	5–6	3–6	T–7th	
2002	Emporia State	9–3	6–3	T–3rd	W Mineral Water Bowl
2003	Emporia State	9–3	7–2	T–1st	L NCAA Division II First Round
2004	Emporia State	5–6	4–5	T–5th	
2005	Emporia State	4–6	3–5	6th	
2006	Emporia State	3–8	2–7	8th	
Emporia State:		35–32	25–28		
Total:		35–32			
National championship Conference title Conference division title or championship game berth
