= Emporia State Hornets football =

Collegiate football team

- First season: 1893; 133 years ago
- Athletic director: Steve Rodecap
- Head coach: Garin Higgins; 16th season, 106–80 (.570)
- Location: Emporia, Kansas
- Stadium: Francis G. Welch Stadium (capacity: 10,000)
- Field: Jones Field
- NCAA division: Division II
- Conference: Mid-America Intercollegiate Athletics Association
- Colors: Black and gold
- All-time record: 548–550–43 (.499)
- Bowl record: 7–8 (.467)

Conference championships
- 14; Kansas Collegiate Athletic Conference: 1903, 1914, 1915, 1919 (Note: Shared with Pittsburgh State University and College of Emporia.), 1926; Central Intercollegiate Conference: 1927 (Note: Shared with College of Emporia.), 1929, 1948 (Note: Shared with Little Rock University and Washburn University.), 1950 (Note: Shared with Washburn University.), 1951 (Note: Shared with Pittsburgh State University.); Central States Intercollegiate Conference: 1985 (Note: Shared with Kearney State University.), 1989 (Note: Shared with Pittsburgh State University.); Mid-America Intercollegiate Association: 2002 (Note: Shared with Northwest Missouri State University.), 2003 (Note: Shared with Central Missouri State University, Missouri Western State University, Northwest Missouri State University, and Pittsburgh State University.)
- Rivalries: Washburn

Uniforms
- Fight song: Fight On, Emporia!
- Mascot: Corky the Hornet
- Marching band: Marching Hornets
- Outfitter: Adidas
- Website: www.esuhornets.com

The Emporia State Hornets football program is a college football team that represents Emporia State University. The team competes as a member of the Mid-America Intercollegiate Athletics Association (MIAA), which is a conference in the NCAA Division II. The program began in 1897 and has fifteen conference titles. On December 15, 2006, former Hornets quarterback Garin Higgins became the team's 24th head coach, following the resignation of Dave Wiemers. Home games are played on Jones Field at Welch Stadium, located on the Emporia State University campus in Emporia, Kansas. In August 2017, Hero Sports named Emporia State the "best football team in Kansas, regardless of division".

== History ==
The most successful era for ESU football was from 1928 to 1954, when the program was coached by Fran Welch and posted an overall .578 winning percentage. From 1955 to 1982, the Hornets struggled to find success on the football field, as the team's overall winning percentage during that era slipped to .295 (74–182–8).

From 1983 through the 2013 season, ESU's winning percentage increased to .537 (182–157–0), and all five coaches at ESU during this era have either a winning record or a tied record. During the 2012 season, the Hornets competed in a postseason game for the first time since 2003 and placed second in the conference.

Until the 1930s, the Kansas State Normal/Kansas State Teachers College (now Emporia State University) didn't have an athletics nickname. In the early 1930s, the athletic teams were then known as the "Yaps". However, many people disliked the name, most notably legendary coach, Vic Trusler. Trusler suggested to a local writer, Cecil Carle of the Emporia Gazette, that the university's athletic teams should be called the "Yellow Jackets" but instead, the name was changed to "Hornets" due to the lack of newspaper space.

=== Early history (1893–1927) ===
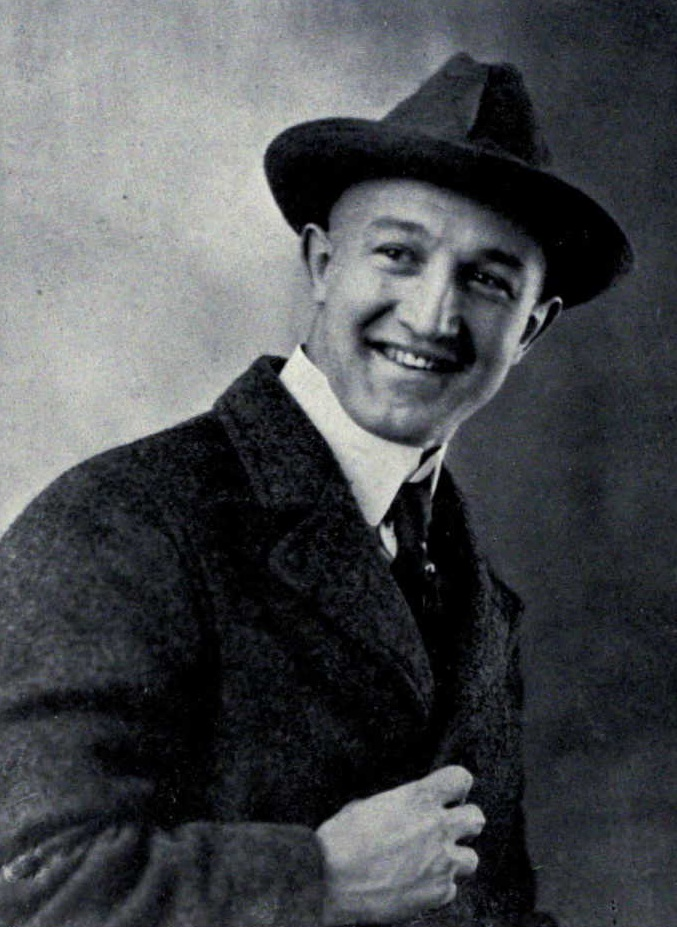
Homer Woodson Hargiss is the only football coach in ESU history to produce a perfect season, which happened in 1923 and 1926.

The Kansas State Normal School (KSN), now known as Emporia State University, fielded its first football team in 1893, which had no coach. In 1893, KSN played the College of Emporia, which KSN won 14–0 and lost 0–24 against the Ottawa Braves. After playing six abbreviated game seasons, KSN played its first full schedule in 1899 and had a 2–3–0 record under no head coach. The 1899 football season was the first of the "Turnpike Tussle" series, which is played between the Hornets and the Washburn Ichabods.

In 1900, John Lamb served one season as KSN's football coach, posting the first winning season in school history (5–3–1). After Lamb's season, Northern Iowa's coach Fred Williams, who later was an attorney, came to KSN from to serve as head coach, but struggled to a 2–6–1 record in his only season in 1901. The 1902 season featured the program's second–only game of its rivalry against Washburn, a 0–6 Hornet loss.

The program had eight head coaches from 1900 to 1913, but in 1914, Bill Hargiss took the position in 1914. He held it for the next three highly successful seasons, through 1917, and then again from 1920 to 1927. Hargiss' overall coaching record at KSN/KSTC was 61–23–11. Hargiss is the only head coach in school history to have an undefeated season and puts him third at the school in terms of winning percentage (.700). Hargiss' best seasons were the 1921 and 1926 seasons, when the Normals/Teachers posted an undefeated season and outscored their opponents 144 to 3. The closest game of the season was a 6–0 battle against Hargiss's former team, the College of Emporia. ESU has not had another undefeated season since 1926.

In the 1918 and 1919 seasons, KSN had two unsuccessful coaches, H. D. McChesney with a 2–2–0 (.500) record, and George McLaren with a 1–6–2 .222 record.

Early years (1893–1927) — Year-by-Year Record
Year	Coach	Overall	Conference	Standing	Bowl/playoffs	Coaches^{#}	AP^{°}
No Coach (Kansas Conference) (1893–1896)
1893	No coach	1–1–0					
1894	No coach	0–2–0					
1895	No coach	0–2–0					
1896	No coach	0–2–0					
No team (Discontinued) (1897–1898)
No Coach (Kansas Conference) (1899)
1899	No coach	2–3–0					
John Lamb (Kansas Conference) (1900)
1900	John Lamb	5–3–1					
Fred Williams (Kansas Conference) (1901)
1901	Fred Williams	3–4–1					
Horace Botsford (Kansas Conference) (1902)
1902	Botsford	3–8–0					
Paul Samson (Kansas Conference) (1903–1906)
1903	Paul Samson	3–4–3					
1904	Paul Samson	6–5–0					
1905	Paul Samson	4–5–0					
1906	Paul Samson	4–4–0					
Owen Samuels (Kansas Conference) (1907)
1907	Owen Samuels	1–6–0					
Paul Samson (Kansas Conference) (1908)
1908	Paul Samson	3–5–0					
Fred Honhart (Kansas Conference) (1909–1911)
1909	Fred Honhart	2–4–2					
1910	Fred Honhart	5–2–0					
1911	Fred Honhart	6–2–0					
George Crispin (Kansas Conference) (1912–1913)
1912	George Crispin	5–3–0					
1913	George Crispin	4–6–0					
Homer Woodson Hargiss (Kansas Conference) (1914–1917)
1914	Homer Woodson Hargiss	5–1–1					
1915	Homer Woodson Hargiss	5–2–2					
1916	Homer Woodson Hargiss	6–3–1					
1917	Homer Woodson Hargiss	5–3–1					
H.D. McChesney (Kansas Conference) (1918)
1918	H. D. McChesney	2–2–0					
George McLaren (Kansas Conference) (1919)
1919	George McLaren	1–6–2					
Homer Woodson Hargiss (Kansas Conference) (1920–1927)
1920	Homer Woodson Hargiss	0–6–2					
1921	Homer Woodson Hargiss	7–0–0					
1922	Homer Woodson Hargiss	6–2–0					
1923	Homer Woodson Hargiss	5–1–1					
1924	Homer Woodson Hargiss	4–4–1					
1925	Homer Woodson Hargiss	4–3–1					
1926	Homer Woodson Hargiss	7–0–0					
1927	Homer Woodson Hargiss	7–0–1					
Total:		121–105–30					
National championship Conference title Conference division title or championship game berth

=== Fran Welch era (1928–1942, 1946–1954) ===
Fran Welch, who coached the football team from 1928 to 1954

KSN alum Fran Welch was hired by his alma mater as the 13th head football coach in 1928, taking over after Bill Hargiss left for the University of Kansas. Welch led the Teachers to a 7–0–1 record during his first season.

In the 1932 and 33 seasons were a low season for the Yaps, as they went to 5–11–2. From 1934 until 1942, the Hornets had some winning seasons, and losing seasons. Because of WWII, the Hornets did not field a team from 1942 to 1945. In the return season of 1946, the Hornets went 4–5; however, in 1947, the Hornets turned things around, leading the 1948 team to a 34–20 win over Southwest Missouri State University at the Missouri-Kansas Bowl. In the next five out of six seasons, the Hornets won five conference championships.

Not only did Welch finish his career as the most successful coach in ESU History, but he finished with 7 conference championships and one bowl game, leading to an overall record of 115–82–15 (.578) during his 26 years as head coach.

Fran Welch (1927–1954) — Year-by-Year Record
Year	Coach	Overall	Conference	Standing	Bowl/playoffs	Coaches^{#}	AP^{°}
Fran Welch (Central Intercollegiate Athletic Conference) (1928–1954)
1928	Fran Welch	6–1–1					
1929	Fran Welch	6–2–0					
1930	Fran Welch	4–2–3					
1931	Fran Welch	4–4–0					
1932	Fran Welch	2–6–1					
1933	Fran Welch	3–5–1					
1934	Fran Welch	7–2–0					
1935	Fran Welch	5–4–0					
1936	Fran Welch	6–4–0					
1937	Fran Welch	5–2–2					
1938	Fran Welch	3–6–0					
1939	Fran Welch	6–3–0					
1940	Fran Welch	6–2–0					
1941	Fran Welch	4–3–2					
1942	Fran Welch	3–4–1					
No team (WWII) (1943–1945)
1946	Fran Welch	4–5–0					
1947	Fran Welch	7–1–1					
1948	Fran Welch	8–2–0			W Missouri-Kansas Bowl		
1949	Fran Welch	6–4–0					
1950	Fran Welch	6–2–1					
1951	Fran Welch	5–3–1					
1952	Fran Welch	7–3–0					
1953	Fran Welch	2–5–1					
1954	Fran Welch	2–7–0					
Total:		115–82–15					
National championship Conference title Conference division title or championship game berth

=== The declining era (1955–1982) ===
==== Caywood era (1955–1966) ====
In 1955, KSTC hired Keith Caywood as the 14th head football coach of KSTC. In his 12 years as head coach at KSTC, he only had one winning season; in 1958, the Hornets went 5–4–1, which included a 0–21 loss to Lincoln (MO) at the Mineral Water Bowl. In 1966, Caywood resigned as head coach posting an overall record of 25–79–5 (.252).

==== Blaylock, Lance, and Elliott eras (1967–1974) ====
From 1967 until 1970, the Hornets continued to struggle. In 1967, Ron Blaylock became the 15th head coach for the Hornets, going 1–9–0 in his first season. Blaylock resigned after two seasons in 1968, ending with an overall record of 6–11–2 (.368). In 1969, Jim Lance was hired as the 16th head coach and much like Blaylock, was unsuccessful. In 1970, he resigned with a record of 6–12–0 (.353).

After nearly two decades of being unsuccessful, KSTC hired Harold Elliott as the 17th head coach in hopes that he could rebuild the program. In 1971, his first season, he led the Hornets to a 3–6–1 record, but turned things around in the 1973 season, he went on to a 7–4–0 record, winning the conference championship and a 14–17 loss to William Penn at the Boot Hill Bowl. He repeated the conference championship in 1974 with a 7–2–0 record. Elliott left KSTC to become the head coach at the University of Texas at Arlington, leaving KSTC with a 17–11–1 (.603) record.

==== Hoover and Seaman eras (1975–1982) ====
For the next nine seasons, Emporia State continued to decline. Dave Hoover became the 18th head coach at ESU, with an overall record of 9–40–0 (.184). After Hoover was let go, Bob Seaman became the 19th head football coach for Emporia State University in Emporia, Kansas and he held that position for four seasons, from 1979 until 1982. His overall coaching record at Emporia State was 10–30.

Decline era (1955–1982) — Year-by-Year Record
Year	Coach	Overall	Conference	Standing	Bowl/playoffs	Coaches^{#}	AP^{°}
Keith Caywood (CIAC) (1955–1966)
1955	Keith Caywood	0–10–0					
1956	Keith Caywood	2–6–1					
1957	Keith Caywood	2–7–0					
1958	Keith Caywood	5–4–1			L Mineral Water Bowl		
1959	Keith Caywood	2–7–0					
1960	Keith Caywood	3–5–0					
1961	Keith Caywood	2–7–0					
1962	Keith Caywood	3–5–1					
1963	Keith Caywood	2–5–2					
1964	Keith Caywood	0–9–0					
1965	Keith Caywood	1–8–0					
1966	Keith Caywood	3–6–0					
Ron Blaylock (Rocky Mountain Athletic Conference) (1967–1968)
1967	Ron Blaylock	1–9–0					
1968	Ron Blaylock	5–2–2					
Jim Lance (RMAC) (1969–1970)
1969	Jim Lance	5–4–0					
1970	Jim Lance	1–8–0			L Boot Hill Bowl		
Harold Elliott (RMAC) (1971–1974)
1971	Harold Elliott	3–6–1					
Great Plains Athletic Conference
1972	Harold Elliott	7–4–0					
1973	Harold Elliott	7–2–0					
Dave Hoover (GPAC) (1974–1978)
1974	Dave Hoover	2–7–0					
1975	Dave Hoover	1–9–0					
Central States Intercollegiate Conference
1976	Dave Hoover	0–10–0					
1977	Dave Hoover	3–7–0					
1978	Dave Hoover	2–8–0					
Bob Seaman (Central States Intercollegiate Conference) (1979–1982)
1979	Bob Seamen	4–6–0					
1980	Bob Seamen	2–8–0					
1981	Bob Seamen	1–9–0					
1982	Bob Seamen	3–7–0					
Total:		77–163–8					
National championship Conference title Conference division title or championship game berth

=== Larry Kramer era (1983–1994) ===
After nearly three decades of being unsuccessful, Larry Kramer became the 20th head coach of Emporia State. In his first two season at ESU, he posted a record of 5–15, but in 1985, he turned the team around and posted a record of 6–4. In 1987 and 1988, Kramer led the Hornets to the NAIA post-season playoffs, which included two losses. In 1989, Kramer led the team to a conference championship and two NAIA playoff games, which led to the NAIA Division I National Championship game, in which they lost 20–34 to Carson-Newman University of Jefferson City, Tennessee. From 1990 until his resignation in 1994, the Hornets posted a record of 26–24–0. Kramer resigned after the 1994 season to become an assistant coach for the Kansas State Wildcats, leaving ESU with an overall record of 71–54–0 (.568).

Larry Kramer (1983–1994) — Year-by-Year Record
Year	Coach	Overall	Conference	Standing	Bowl/playoffs	Coaches^{#}	AP^{°}
Larry Kramer (CSIC) (1983–1994)
1983	Larry Kramer	2–8–0					
1984	Larry Kramer	3–7–0					
1985	Larry Kramer	6–4–0					
1986	Larry Kramer	8–2–0					
1987	Larry Kramer	7–4–0			L NAIA playoffs		
1988	Larry Kramer	8–3–0					
Independent
1989	Larry Kramer	11–2–0			L NAIA Championship Game		
1990	Larry Kramer	6–4–0					
Mid-America Intercollegiate Athletics Association
1991	Larry Kramer	5–5–0	4–5				
1992	Larry Kramer	7–3–0	6–3				
1993	Larry Kramer	3–7–0	3–6				
1994	Larry Kramer	5–5–0	4–5				
Total:		71–54–0					
National championship Conference title Conference division title or championship game berth

=== Manny Matsakis era (1995–1998) ===
The 21st head football coach for the Hornets was Manny Matsakis. During Matsakis' four years, the Hornets went 27–17–0 (.614). After the 1998 season, Matsakis left Emporia State to be an assistant for the University of Wyoming.

Manny Matsakis (1995–1998) — Year-by-Year Record
Year	Coach	Overall	Conference	Standing	Bowl/playoffs	Coaches^{#}	AP^{°}
Manny Matsakis (MIAA) (1995–1998)
1995	Manny Matsakis	5–6	4–5				
1996	Manny Matsakis	5–6	5–4				
1997	Manny Matsakis	8–3	5–4				
1998	Manny Matsakis	9–2	7–2				
Total:		27–17					
National championship Conference title Conference division title or championship game berth

=== Jerry Kill era (1999–2000) ===
Jerry Kill became the 22nd head football coach for Emporia State in 1999. In his first season, the Hornets went 5–6–0, but in his last season in 2000, the Hornets went 6–5–0. After the 2000 season, he left with a tied record of 11–11–0 (.500) to be the head coach at the Southern Illinois Salukis. Kill is the current interim head coach for the TCU Horned Frogs.

Jerry Kill (1999–2000) — Year-by-Year Record
Year	Coach	Overall	Conference	Standing	Bowl/playoffs	Coaches^{#}	AP^{°}
Jerry Kill (MIAA) (1999–2000)
1999	Jerry Kill	5–6	4–5				
2000	Jerry Kill	6–5	5–4				
Total:		11–11					
National championship Conference title Conference division title or championship game berth

=== Dave Wiemers era (2001–2006) ===
Dave Wiemers took the helm as the 23rd Hornet football coach in 2001, replacing Jerry Kill. Although the Hornets were unsuccessful in his first season going 5–6, Wiemers led the Hornets to a 9–2 season in 2002 and a trip to the Mineral Water Bowl, which they won in overtime 34–27 against Winona State. In 2003, the Hornets won a co-conference championship and made their first–ever trip to the NCAA Division II playoffs, losing to Winona State 3–10. Following those two successful seasons, the Hornets declined and failed to have a winning season. Between 2004 and 2006, the Hornets posted a combined record of 12–20–0. Wiemers resigned on November 16, 2006, leaving Emporia State with a record of 35–32–0 (.522).

Dave Wiemers (2001–2006) — Year-by-Year Record
Year	Coach	Overall	Conference	Standing	Bowl/playoffs	Coaches^{#}	AP^{°}
Dave Wiemers (MIAA) (2001–2006)
2001	Dave Wiemers	5–6	2–6				
2002	Dave Wiemers	9–3	6–3		W Mineral Water Bowl		
2003	Dave Wiemers	9–3	7–3	T–1st	L NCAA Div. II Playoffs		
2004	Dave Wiemers	5–6	4–5				
2005	Dave Wiemers	4–6	3–5				
2006	Dave Wiemers	3–8	2–6				
Total:		35–32					
National championship Conference title Conference division title or championship game berth

=== Garin Higgins era (2007–present) ===
Garin Higgins (2007–present)
Season	Overall record	MIAA record	Conf. stand.	Postseason
2007	3–8	1–8	9th	
2008	4–7	2–7	8th	
2009	2–9	1–8	9th	
2010	5–6	3–6	7th	
2011	5–6	3–6	6th	
2012	10–2	9–2	2nd	Kanza Bowl (W: 45–38)
2013	9–2	9–1	2nd	NCAA Playoffs (L: 13–55)
2014	4–7	4–7	7th	
2015	11–3	9–2	2nd	NCAA Regionals Final (L: 17–38)
2016	11–2	10–1	2nd	NCAA Playoffs 2nd (L: 13–44)
2017	6–5	6–5	T-6th	
2018	8–4	7–4	T-4th	Corsicana Bowl (W: 30–22)
2019	4–7	4–7	9th	
2020	2020 Season suspended due to COVID-19			
2021	6–6	6–5	T–5th	Live United Texarkana Bowl (L: 34–37)
2022	9–3	8–3	T–3rd	Live United Texarkana Bowl (W: 48–27)
2023	0–0	0–0	2nd	
Overall record: 97–77 (.557)		Conference record: 81–72 (.529)		Record: 3–4 (.429)

==== The first five seasons: 2007–2011 ====
On December 14, 2006, Higgins was introduced as the 24th head football coach of Emporia State University, replacing Dave Wiemers who resigned after three consecutive losing seasons. On September 1, 2007, the Hornets opened the season with a 7–3 win over the Western State Colorado Mountaineers, securing his' first win as a coach at his alma mater. Higgins led the Hornets to their first 3–0 season since 2003, but that quickly ended once they began conference play losing their final eight games. The Hornets finished 3–8 overall, 1–8 in conference play. The following season in 2008, Higgins led the Hornets to a 4–7 overall, 2–7 in conference play season with their only two conference wins against Fort Hays State and Truman.

During his third year as head coach of the Hornets, Higgins led his team to the program's lowest overall winning record since 1980 – 2–8. The next season, however, Higgins turned the program around and finished the next two seasons 5–6 overall, and 3–6 in conference play.

==== 2012 and 2013 seasons ====
During his sixth season at Emporia State, the university had undergone a leadership change. With the new leadership change, came a new atmosphere on campus and Higgins led the Hornets to their first winning season since 2003. The Hornets started the season off strong winning their first eight games – the program's first since 1988 – earning them national rankings as well for the first time since 2003. In the first five games, the Hornets scored 30+ points per game. Finishing 10–2 overall, 9–2 in conference play led Higgins to secure a second-place finish in the MIAA and a bid to the Kanza Bowl where they defeated the Texas A&M–Kingsville Javelinas 45–38. Quarterback Tyler Eckenrode finished his career at Emporia State with school records and as a finalist for the Harlon Hill Trophy.

After a successful season and losing a record-breaking quarterback, the Hornets were chosen to finish in seventh place in the MIAA preseason polls. The Hornets also were starting to receive votes for national rankings, as well. Higgins led the Hornets to another 8–0 start, scoring 35+ points a game. The No. 10 Hornets' winning streak was again snapped to the Northwest Missouri State Bearcats. The Hornets won their next game after against Washburn. Finishing regular season play, Higgins led the Hornets to a 9–1 overall, 9–1 in conference play, advancing to the NCAA Playoffs for the first time since 2003. The Hornets lost to the Minnesota–Duluth Bulldogs 55–13.

==== 2014 and 2015 seasons ====
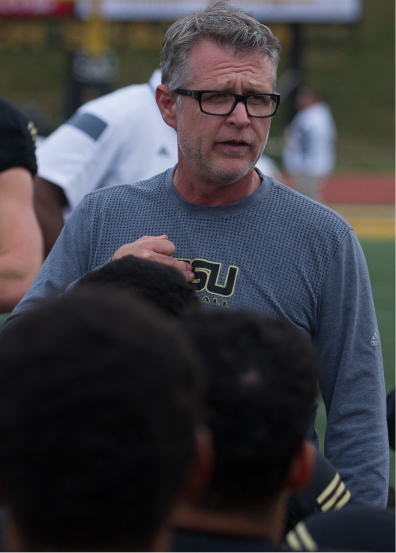
Higgins talking to the team after a win against the Missouri Western Griffons in 2015

Starting his eighth season, the Hornets began the year ranked No. 22 in the preseason AFCA poll. Facing injuries from last season, the Hornets started off with a win against Missouri Southern. Following the first win of the season, the Hornets moved to No. 19 in the polls, but would quickly decline after losing the next two games. The Hornets would go on to win the next two games, but would then lose the next two. The Hornets won one more before losing the last two games, finishing the season 4–7 both overall and in conference play.

After having their first losing season since 2011, Higgins was quickly able to get the program winning again during his ninth season. The Hornets started the season 6–0, scoring 38+ points in the first five games, and quickly regained their national rankings after being unranked for a year. The second game of the season against Central Missouri was suspended at halftime due to severe weather. At the time the game was suspended, the Hornets were tied with the Mules at 24. The Hornets defeated the Mules two days later 45–34. In the last four games of the season, the Hornets went 3–1, losing to Northwest Missouri State again. Finishing the regular season play, Higgins led the Hornets to a 9–2 overall and in conference play. The Hornets once again returned to the NCAA playoffs winning the first two games, and falling to Northwest Missouri State in the third round. Quarterback Brent Wilson was a finalist for the Harlon Hill Trophy, making him the second Hornet in three years to be named a finalist.

==== 2016 season ====
Starting in his tenth season with the Hornets, Higgins began the season with Northwest Missouri State – the first time two nationally ranked teams kicked off the football season inside Francis G. Welch Stadium since it opened in 1937. After Wilson graduated, the quarterback position was open. Higgins selected a redshirt sophomore who had played in during his freshman year when both Wilson and the back-up quarterback were injured. Emporia State opened the season ranked No. 24 nationally and lost its first game against No. 1 and eventual National Champion Northwest Missouri State. From there, the Hornets won the rest of the regular season play finishing the regular season ranked No. 9 and a 10–1 overall and in conference play record. The Hornets also hosted an NCAA Division II playoff game for the first time in school history (the last playoff game was in 1989 for the NAIA where Higgins was a player). In the first game, the Hornets defeated Minnesota–Duluth 59–26, and ended the season in the second round to Northwest Missouri State 44–13.

=== Conference championships ===
Year	Conference	Coach	Overall record	Conference record
1915^{†}	Kansas Collegiate Athletic Conference	Homer Woodson Hargiss	5–2–2	4–0–1
1916	Kansas Collegiate Athletic Conference	Homer Woodson Hargiss	6–3–1	5–1–1
1917^{†}	Kansas Collegiate Athletic Conference	Homer Woodson Hargiss	5–3–1	5–0–1
1921^{†}	Kansas Collegiate Athletic Conference	Homer Woodson Hargiss	7–0	6–0
1926	Kansas Collegiate Athletic Conference	Homer Woodson Hargiss	7–0	7–0
1927^{†}	Kansas Collegiate Athletic Conference	Homer Woodson Hargiss	7–0–1	6–0–1
1929	Central Intercollegiate Athletic Conference	Fran Welch	6–2	5–1
1947	Central Intercollegiate Athletic Conference	Fran Welch	7–1–1	4–0–1
1948	Central Intercollegiate Athletic Conference	Fran Welch	8–2	5–0
1950	Central Intercollegiate Athletic Conference	Fran Welch	6–2–1	5–0
1951^{†}	Central Intercollegiate Athletic Conference	Fran Welch	5–3–1	5–0
1952	Central Intercollegiate Athletic Conference	Fran Welch	7–3	5–0
1972	Great Plains Athletic Conference	Harold Elliott	7–4	5–1
1973^{†}	Great Plains Athletic Conference	Harold Elliott	7–2	4–1
1989	Independent	Larry Kramer	10–3	–
2003^{†}	Mid-America Intercollegiate; Athletics Association	Dave Wiemers	9–3	7–2
15 Conference Championships		5 coaches	109–30–12	78–6–5
† Denotes co-champions

== Record vs. MIAA opponents ==
Emporia State vs. MIAA members
Current MIAA members
Emporia State vs.	First game	Overall record	at Emporia	at Opponent's venue	Last 5 meetings	Last 10 meetings	Current streak	Since joining the MIAA
Central Missouri	1901	UCM, 20–40–4	UCM, 5–9	UCM, 4–9	UCM, 2–3	UCM, 2–8	W 1	UCM, 8–17
Central Oklahoma	1928	UCO, 8–11–1	ESU, 3–2	ESU, 4–1	ESU, 4–1	UCO, 4–6	W 1	ESU, 5–2
Fort Hays State	1923	ESU, 53–37–2	ESU, 14–7	FHSU, 9–12	ESU, 3–2	ESU, 6–5	W 1	ESU, 7–6
Lindenwood	2012	ESU, 6–1	ESU, 3–1	ESU, 3–0	ESU, 4–1	ESU, 6–1	L 1	ESU, 6–1
Missouri Southern	1970	Tied, 22–22	ESU, 14–9	MSSU, 8–13	ESU, 5–0	ESU, 7–3	W 7	ESU, 16–9
Missouri Western	1976	MWSU, 15–26	MWSU, 6–13	MWSU, 9–10	ESU, 3–2	MWSU, 1–9	L 1	Tied, 14–14
Nebraska–Kearney	1975	UNK, 11–12	ESU, 6–3	ESU, 5–4	ESU, 5–0	ESU, 10–0	W 4	ESU, 6–1
Northeastern State	1954	ESU, 8–5	ESU, 3–1	ESU, 5–0	ESU, 5–0	ESU, 8–2	W 7	ESU, 6–1
Northwest Missouri State	1930	NWMSU, 2–33	NWMSU, 1–15	NWMSU, 1–18	NWMSU, 0–5	NWMSU, 0–10	L 26	NWMSU, 1–29
Pittsburg State	1915	PSU, 34–61–2	PSU, 17–32–1	PSU, 17–29–1	PSU, 1–4	PSU, 1–9	L 2	PSU, 6–20
Washburn	1899	ESU, 57–52–6	ESU, 29–22–2	WU, 28–30–4	ESU, 5–0	Tied, 5–5	W 5	ESU, 18–9
Sources: — As of October 11, 2026.

== Venue, tradition and culture ==
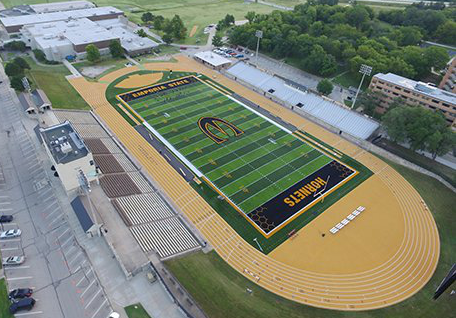
Aerial view of Welch Stadium

=== Stadium ===
Francis G. Welch Stadium serves as home to the Hornets football team. The stadium, which is named for long–time Emporia State football coach and athletic director Fran Welch, opened in 1947 and since then has gone under a few renovations. In 1994, the east and west side concession areas, restroom facilities, and entrances were renovated, a new scoreboard was hoisted into place at the south end of the stadium and a new landscaped fence was erected. In 1997, the Hutchinson Family Pavilion, a three–tiered facility which has enclosed theatre seating on the first floor, a president's box and four sky–boxes on the second floor, and a game–day management and media center on the third floor was built. The current seating capacity is 7,000.

=== Silent Joe ===
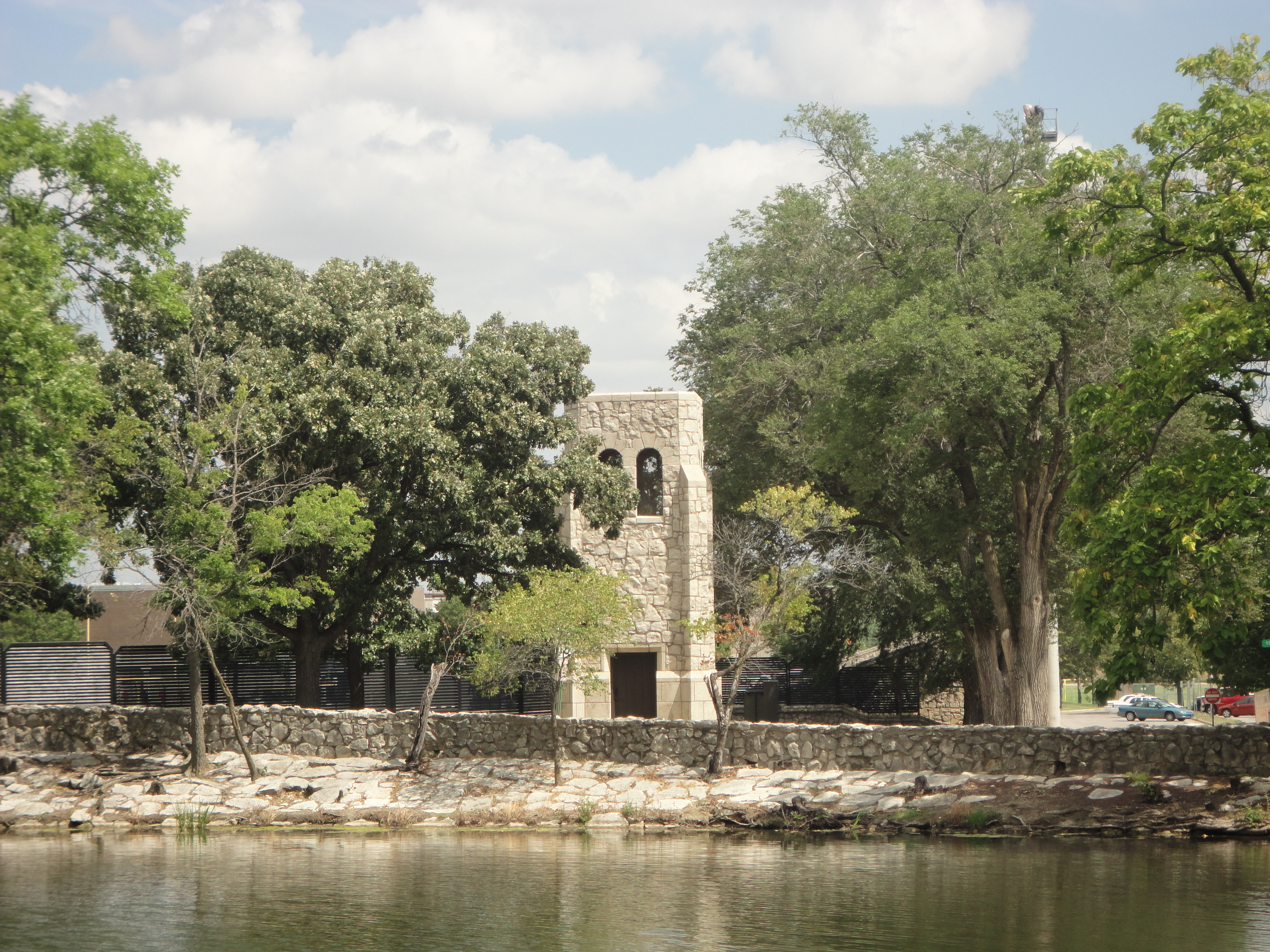
The "Silent Joe" Bell Tower

The bell tower adjacent to the football stadium is known as "Silent Joe." The bell, which weighs approximately 1,400 pounds, was first used in 1855 and hung in the original KSN administration building until 1880.

In 1880 when the former administration building was razed, the bell was kept in storage until the present bell tower was completed in August 1939. The plan was for the bell to be rung only after a school victory. The 1939 Hornet football squad was expected to be a “superteam.” Some optimists speculated the bell would be worn out halfway through the season, but after the first two games that season, the contrary became apparent. After that, the bell was known as “Silent Joe.” The name “Joe” was chosen because it was a common label for male students then.

=== School colors ===
Black	Gold

Emporia State's official school colors are black and gold. They have been the colors since the school was founded in 1863, and until recently, the gold was Old gold.

=== Mascot ===
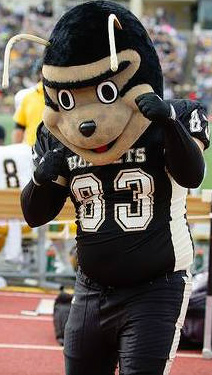
Corky the Hornet at an Emporia State football game.

Corky the Hornet is Emporia State University's mascot. In 1923 when the Emporia State was named to the Kansas State Teachers College, the athletic teams were known as the "Yaps". Many people not like the name, most notably Emporia State coach Vic Trusler. Trusler suggested to Cecil Carle of the Emporia Gazette that the university's athletic teams should be called the "Yellow Jackets". However, the name changed to "Hornets" due to the lack of newspaper space.

In 1933, the Teachers College had a student contest where students and staff could design a mascot for the college. Sophomore Paul Edwards, who graduated in 1937, designed Corky. Although hundreds of drawings were submitted, Edwards' Corky, a "human-like" hornet was selected. Corky was published in The Bulletin, the student newspaper for Emporia State University.

== Notable players ==
- Ross Bjork – fullback from 1991 to 1994; now an NCAA Division I athletic director
- Dale Burnett – Former New York Giants player and was on 1932 World Championship team
- John Davis – former player for the Dallas Cowboys, Tampa Bay Buccaneers and Minnesota Vikings
- Kelly Goodburn – Former Kansas City Chiefs and Washington Redskins player; played in Super Bowl XXVI with Washington
- Leon Lett – helped Hornets to the NAIA National Championship game in 1989; played for Dallas Cowboys in 3 Super Bowls
- Bob Leahy – played for the Pittsburgh Steelers
- John Lohmeyer – player for the Kansas City Chiefs
- Brian Shay – 1998 Harlon Hill Trophy winner; broke 17 NCAA Division II records
- Austin Willis – football player
