= List of faculty and alumni of Elon University =

This is a list of notable people associated with Elon University in Elon, North Carolina, United States.

== Notable faculty ==
- Crista Arangala – mathematician
- Shane Atkinson – imam and chaplain
- Jan Boxill – ethicist
- Jacob Brent – actor, director, choreographer and assistant professor of musical theatre
- Peter S. Brunstetter – professor of Law, and member of the North Carolina General Assembly
- Cardon V. Burnham – composer, arranger, conductor, and performer
- Ann J. Cahill – feminist philosopher
- Eileen Claussen – climate and energy policy administrator, diplomat, and executive-in-residence at Elon
- Geoffrey Claussen – rabbi, Jewish ethicist and theologian
- David M. Crowe – historian
- Rebecca Ehretsman – eighteenth president of Wartburg College
- James G. Exum – distinguished professor of the Judicial Process at the Elon Law School
- David Gergen – inaugural Isabella Cannon Distinguished Visiting Professor of Leadership at Elon
- Thomas S. Henricks – professor of sociology
- David C. Joyce – president of Brevard College
- Sandra Lawson – sociologist, rabbi and chaplain
- Elliot Mazer – audio engineer and music professor
- Jon Metzger – professor of Music and artist-in-residence
- Paul Neebe – classical trumpeter and former professor of music at Elon
- Guy Owen – novelist
- Rebecca Todd Peters – feminist Christian ethicist
- Jeffrey Pugh – theologian
- Michael Skube – journalist on the faculty of the Elon University School of Communications
- Megan Squire – computer scientist
- Justin Tornow – dancer and choreographer
- A. R. Van Cleave – professor of philosophy and football coach
- Anthony Weston – philosopher and environmental ethicist
- Tripp York – religious studies scholar

=== Presidents ===
==== As Elon College (1889–2001) ====
- William S. Long, 1889–1894
- William Wesley Staley, 1894–1905
- Emmett Leonidas Moffitt, 1905–1911
- William Allen Harper, 1911–1931
- Leon Edgar Smith, 1931–1957
- James Earl Danieley, 1957–1973
- James Fred Young, 1973–1998
- Leo Lambert, 1999–2018

==== As Elon University (2001–present) ====
- Leo Lambert, 1999–2018
- Connie Ledoux Book, 2018–present

== Notable alumni ==
=== Athletics ===
- Tal Abernathy – Major League Baseball (MLB) pitcher
- Jesse Branson – National Basketball Association and American Basketball Association player
- John Brebbia – MLB pitcher for the San Francisco Giants
- Elijah Bryant (born 1995) – basketball playerin the Israeli Basketball Premier League; formerly in the NBA
- Ward Burton – NASCAR auto racer
- Cap Clark – MLB catcher
- Billy Devaney – general manager of the St. Louis Rams
- Bill Dougherty – running back for the New Orleans Saints
- Wes Durham – radio play-by-play announcer for the Georgia Tech Yellow Jackets and the Atlanta Falcons
- Keith Gaither – college football coach
- Joey Hackett – tight end for the Denver Broncos and Green Bay Packers
- Frank Haith – head basketball coach at the University of Tulsa
- Greg W. Harris – MLB pitcher
- Bunn Hearn – MLB pitcher
- Clint Irwin – Colorado Rapids goalkeeper
- Don Kernodle – professional wrestler
- Steven Kinney – defender for the Chicago Fire
- George Kirby – starting pitcher for the Seattle Mariners
- Daniel Lovitz – defender for the Nashville SC
- Rich McGeorge – tight end for the Green Bay Packers
- Jack McKeon – MLB manager
- Aaron Mellette – Baltimore Ravens wide receiver
- Jim Morris – head baseball coach at the University of Miami
- Chad Nkang – former linebacker for the Jacksonville Jaguars
- Blake Russell – Olympic runner
- Ed Sauer –MLB outfielder
- Jim Schlossnagle – head baseball coach at University of Texas at Austin
- Tony Settles – linebacker for the Washington Redskins
- Jimmy Smith – former American football running back in the National Football League
- Dick Such – MLB pitcher and coach
- Oli Udoh – offensive lineman for the Minnesota Vikings
- Joe West – MLB umpire
- Joe Winkelsas – MLB pitcher
- Deborah A. Yow – North Carolina State University athletics director, formerly University of Maryland's director of athletics

=== Arts, literature, and entertainment ===
- Rich Blomquist – Emmy Award-winning writer on The Daily Show
- Reno Collier – standup comic, host of NBC's The Great American Road Trip
- Shane Gillis – standup comic (did not graduate)
- Lisa Goldstein – actress, plays Millicent Huxtable on the CW series One Tree Hill
- Grant Gustin – actor Glee, The Flash (did not graduate)
- Tal Henry – orchestra director
- Maity Interiano – journalist and television producer
- Christopher Knight – filmmaker, blogger, and Internet personality
- Patsy Lynch – American photographer
- Tyler Marenyi – DJ and producer
- Will Neff – Twitch streamer
- Zane Phillips – actor (Legacies, Fire Island)
- H. Reid – writer, photographer, and historian
- Martin Ritt – director, actor, and playwright (Hud, Norma Rae, Stanley & Iris)
- Brent Sexton – actor (Bosch, Deadwood)
- Mark St. Cyr – actor, plays Mr. Mazzara on the Disney+ series High School Musical: The Musical: The Series
- Mike Trainor – standup comic, panelist on TruTV's The Smoking Gun Presents: World's Dumbest...
- Taylor Trensch – Broadway actor (Dear Evan Hansen, Hello Dolly, The Curious Incident of the Dog in Night-Time)
- Kenneth Utt – actor and producer (The Silence of the Lambs, Midnight Cowboy, Philadelphia)
- Barrett Wilbert Weed – Broadway actress (Heathers: The Musical, Mean Girls)
- Chris Wood – actor (The Vampire Diaries, Containment, Supergirl)

=== Politics and military ===
- Cary D. Allred – North Carolina politician
- Harris Blake – North Carolina politician
- Cameron DeJong – New Hampshire politician
- Anthony Foriest – North Carolina politician
- Admiral William E. Gortney – commander, NORAD and US Northern Command
- Hugh Holliman – North Carolina House of Representatives majority leader
- Phillip Kellam – Virginia politician
- Nat Robertson – Fayetteville, North Carolina mayor

=== Other ===
- John Decatur Messick – former president of East Carolina University (1947–1959)
- MacHenry Schafer – Presbyterian minister and transgender rights activist
- H. Shelton Smith – scholar of religion at Duke University
- Drew Van Horn – president of Young Harris College (from 2017); former president of Brevard College (2002–2011)
