= Elon Phoenix =

Intercollegiate sports teams of Elon University

- University: Elon University
- Nickname: Phoenix
- NCAA: Division I (FCS)
- Conference: Coastal Athletic Association
- Athletic director: Jennifer Strawley
- Location: Elon, North Carolina
- Varsity teams: 17
- Football stadium: Rhodes Stadium
- Basketball arena: Schar Center
- Baseball stadium: Latham Park
- Soccer stadium: Rudd Field
- Other venues: Jimmy Powell Tennis Center; Hunt Softball Park
- Colors: Maroon and gold
- Mascot: The Phoenix
- Fight song: "Elon Fight"
- Website: elonphoenix.com
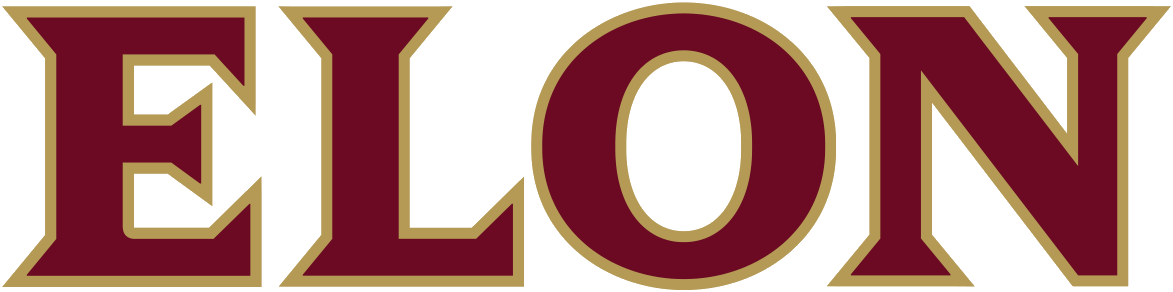

The Elon Phoenix is the official mascot of Elon University, located in Elon, North Carolina. It is the name that each of the sports teams at the university are referred to. The university is a member of the Coastal Athletic Association and that league's technically separate football arm of CAA Football. Elon competes in the NCAA Division I Football Championship Subdivision, fielding 17 varsity teams in 11 sports.

All of Elon's varsity teams currently compete in sports sponsored or administered by the CAA (CAA Football is administered by the multi-sports CAA).

Elon moved to the Coastal Athletic Association, then known as the Colonial Athletic Association, on July 1, 2014.

== History ==
The turn of the century saw the foundation of then-Elon College athletics begin to form. The school's first intercollegiate athletic event came in 1900 when the school played two baseball games against Guilford College in a home-and-home series and the first gymnasium was built in 1905. Football began play in 1909, while men's basketball followed in 1911.

In 1921, the team was first called the Fightin' Christians. The moniker is said to have been coined by a sportswriter covering a contest between Elon and nearby Guilford College, a Quaker school. The school became a charter member of the North State Conference in 1930 and remained a member of the conference and its successors until departing for the South Atlantic Conference in 1989. The Fightin' Christians saw great success in the North State Conference, winning numerous conference titles and national championships. The football team won NAIA national titles in 1980 and 1981 under Coach Jerry Tolley, who was named national coach of the year for the 1980 season. Both titles were won in championship games played on Elon's home field in neighboring Burlington, North Carolina. The men's golf team and men's tennis teams also claimed NAIA national championships, with men's golf winning in 1982 and men's tennis winning in 1990, respectively.

Women's sports became a part of the Elon athletic department in the early 1970s, as legendary coach Kay Yow began her college coaching career by guiding the first-ever women's basketball and women's volleyball teams at Elon. Softball was added in 1977, while women's tennis began play in 1979. Six other women's teams have been added in the years since, including soccer, cross country, golf, indoor track, outdoor track and lacrosse.

In 1993, the South Atlantic Conference and its members moved from NAIA competition to NCAA Division II, where Elon would remain through the 1996–1997 season. In 1997, Elon began the transition into NCAA Division I, becoming a full member in 1999. Division I membership meant a new conference and Elon joined the Big South Conference. The women's soccer team quickly earned the school's first ever NCAA Division I tournament berth by winning the Big South tournament in the fall of 1999.

Still known as the Fightin' Christians at the time, many did not feel that the nickname was universal enough for a team making the transition to Division I athletics, and in 2000, Elon College officially changed its mascot to the Phoenix. The choice refers to a 1923 fire that destroyed nearly the entire campus. Soon after the fire, the university trustees began planning to make Elon "rise from the ashes". The Phoenix was a mythical creature that rose from the ashes of its predecessors.

At the beginning of the 2001–02 season, the school was renamed Elon University to better reflect growing educational options. Change was not far behind in athletics as the Phoenix became members of the Southern Conference beginning in 2003.

== Sports sponsored ==
Colonial Athletic Association logo in Elon's colors

| Men's sports | Women's sports |
|---|---|
| Baseball | Basketball |
| Basketball | Cross country |
| Cross country | Golf |
| Football | Lacrosse |
| Golf | Soccer |
| Lacrosse | Softball |
| Soccer | Tennis |
| Tennis | Track and field^{1} |
| | Volleyball |
^{1} – includes both indoor and outdoor

== Championships ==
=== Team national champinoships ===
| Sport | Association | Division | Year | Runner-up | Score |
|---|---|---|---|---|---|
| Men's tennis (1) | NAIA | Single | 1990 | North Florida | 31–26 |
| Men's golf (1) | NAIA | Single | 1982 | Texas Wesleyan | 1179–1185 |
| Football (2) | NAIA | Division I | 1980 | Northeastern State | 17–10 |
| Football (2) | NAIA | Division I | 1981 | Pittsburg State | 3–0 |

== Facilities ==
Elon's sports facilities include the Schar Center, Alumni Gym, Walter C. Latham Park, Rhodes Stadium, the on-campus football stadium, Alumni Field House, Koury Field House, Rudd Field, Hunt Softball Park, Jimmy Powell Tennis Center, the Jeanne and Jerry Robertson Track and Field Complex, Rudd Field and the Worseley Golf Center. Schar Center, the replacement for Alumni Gym as the home of Phoenix men's basketball, women's basketball and volleyball, opened on August 28, 2018 with a volleyball match against North Carolina A&T.

== Notable former athletes ==
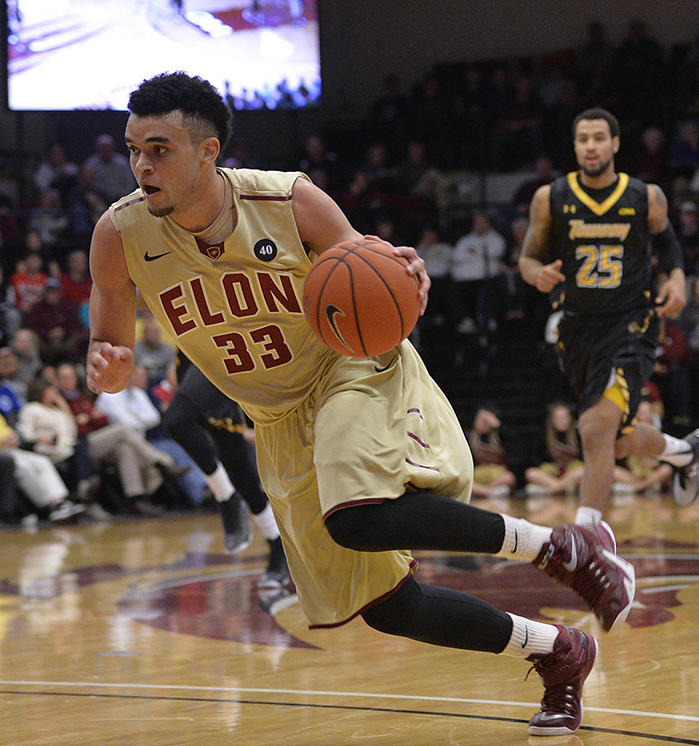
Elijah Bryant

- Hal Bradley, Football (1936)
- Jesse Branson, Basketball (1965)
- John Brebbia (born 1990), Baseball
- Elijah Bryant (born 1995), Basketball
- Ward Burton, NASCAR driver (1985)
- Joey Hackett, Football (1981)
- Greg W. Harris, Baseball (1987)
- Clint Irwin, Soccer (2010)
- Steven Kinney, Soccer (2009)
- Daniel Lovitz, Soccer (2013)
- Chad Nkang, Football (2007)
- Aaron Mellette, Football (2013)
- Oli Udoh, Football (2018)
- Shane Gillis, Football (2006)
- Zora Stephenson, Basketball (2015)
- Sydel Curry, Volleyball (2017)
