= List of Elon Phoenix in the NFL draft =

This is a list of Elon Phoenix football players in the NFL draft.

== Key ==
B	Back	K	Kicker	NT	Nose tackle
C	Center	LB	Linebacker	FB	Fullback
DB	Defensive back	P	Punter	HB	Halfback
DE	Defensive end	QB	Quarterback	WR	Wide receiver
DT	Defensive tackle	RB	Running back	G	Guard
E	End	T	Offensive tackle	TE	Tight end

== Selections ==
Year	Round	Pick	Overall	Player	Team	Position
1938	10	9	89	Jack Abbott	Washington Redskins	B
1942	20	7	187	Bill Polantonio	Brooklyn Dodgers	G
1952	25	6	295	Sal Gero	Washington Redskins	T
1954	25	10	299	John Platt	San Francisco 49ers	B
1959	20	8	236	Tony Carcaterra	Chicago Bears	E
1965	6	8	78	Bill Harrison	Los Angeles Rams	E
1970	1	16	16	Rich McGeorge	Green Bay Packers	TE
1972	12	9	295	Sam Key	San Diego Chargers	LB
1973	17	9	425	Kenneth Morgan	Denver Broncos	TE
1974	10	23	257	Glenn Ellis	Baltimore Colts	DT
1975	5	26	130	Brent Sexton	Pittsburgh Steelers	DB
1978	7	27	193	Danny Bass	Cincinnati Bengals	T
1984	4	18	102	Jimmy Smith	Washington Redskins	RB
1992	12	14	322	Joe Randolph	Minnesota Vikings	WR
2007	7	41	251	Chad Nkang	Jacksonville Jaguars	LB
2013	7	32	238	Aaron Mellette	Baltimore Ravens	WR
2019	6	20	193	Oli Udoh	Minnesota Vikings	T
