= Terrell Hudgins =

American football player and coach (born 1987)

Profile
- Position: Wide receiver

Personal information
- Born: February 24, 1987 (age 39); Rocky Mount, North Carolina, U.S.
- Listed height: 6 ft 2 in (1.88 m)
- Listed weight: 225 lb (102 kg)

Career information
- College: Elon
- NFL draft: 2010: undrafted

Career history
- Dallas Cowboys (2010)*; Chicago Rush (2011)*
- * Offseason or practice squad member only

Awards and highlights
- 2× Stein H. Basnight Award winner as top male athlete of University (07-08, 09-10); 3× Walter Camp Football Foundation All-America First-Team; 2× AP All-American; 2× The Sports Network All-America First-Team; 3× All-SoCon honors from Socon's coaches; 4× All-Socon honors from League's media; 2009 Walter Payton Award Runner-Up
- Stats at ArenaFan.com

Terrell Hudgins (born February 24, 1987) is an American football coach and former wide receiver who set NCAA records in college as a player for Elon University. He was temporarily a member of the Dallas Cowboys off-season/practice squad before being signed by the Chicago Rush of the Arena Football League. He is now the head football coach at Rocky Mount Academy.

== Early life ==
He is the son of Darius and Leslie Hudgins of Rocky Mount, North Carolina. Hudgins was a three-year starter at quarterback during his high school career at Rocky Mount High School and received the North Carolina High School Athletic Association Male Athlete of the Year Award during his senior year.

Hudgins, a three-sport (football, basketball, baseball) athlete, finished his high school career as the school's career leader in yards passing (5,524), completions (292), attempts (587) and touchdown passes (61).

== College career ==
Hudgins was a starting wide receiver for Elon University from 2006 to 2010 and received numerous awards for his achievements on the field. Hudgins has been described by his coaches as a "Talented pass catcher with excellent hand-eye coordination...Quality person who has represented the Elon program well on campus and in the Alamance County community" and by the Rocky Mount Telegram as "Shakespeare — because all he does is make plays." While in college, Hudgins broke several of Jerry Rice's career records, including receiving yards (5,250) and receptions (395).

Elon football coach Pete Lembo, stated that he valued coaching and mentoring Terrell. Lembo described him as a talented wide receiver and a sincere person who had a positive impact on the university. He noted that Terrell's leadership and performance hold a certain importance to the team's improvement and its first appearance in the FCS playoffs in 2009.

=== College records ===
NCAA records:

- 207 Combined receptions in one season (FCS record with former teammate Michael Mayers in 2007)
- 395 Career receptions (all NCAA Division I record) (since broken)
- 123 Receptions in a season (2009; FCS record)
- 8.8 Career receptions per game (FCS record)
- 5,250 Career receiving yards (all NCAA Division I record)
- 116.7 Career average yards gained receiving per game (FCS record)
- 28 Career games gaining 100 or more yards receiving (all NCAA Division I record)
- 1.2 Career touchdown passes caught per game (ties FCS record)
- 34 Career games with a touchdown reception (FCS record)
- 4 Career 1,000-yard receiving seasons (all NCAA Division I record)

SoCon records:

- 10 Games in a season with 100 or more receiving yards (2009)
- 5 Consecutive games with 100 or more receiving yards (2006, 2009)
- 2,538 Combined receiving yards in a season (with former teammate Michael Mayers in 2007)
- 3 Career 200 or more receiving yard games (tied)
- 52 Career receiving touchdowns
- 1,633 Receiving yards in a season (2009)

Elon records:

- 16 Receptions in a single game (record broken in 2010 season by Aaron Mellette)
- 4 Touchdown receptions in a single game (vs. Liberty in 2007)
- 18 Touchdown receptions in a season (2007)

== Professional career ==
Hudgins worked out for a few professional teams, including the Carolina Panthers, Denver Broncos and New York Giants at Elon's pro-day. He ran the 40-yard dash three times, clocking 4.52, 4.56 and 4.6. He was projected to go in the later rounds of the NFL draft, but in the end he entered the league as a free-agent.

Hudgins was signed as an undrafted free agent by the Dallas Cowboys on April 25, 2010. On August 8, 2010, at the Hall of Fame game against the Cincinnati Bengals, Hudgins caught his first NFL pass, a 12-yard catch. He was waived by the Cowboys on August 30, 2010.

Hudgins signed a contract with the Chicago Rush of the Arena Football League as of November 30, 2010. On February 27, 2011, it was reported that he had left the team.
