= Elon Phoenix men's basketball statistical leaders =

The Elon Phoenix men's basketball statistical leaders are individual statistical leaders of the Elon Phoenix men's basketball program in various categories, including points, rebounds, assists, steals, and blocks. Within those areas, the lists identify single-game, single-season, and career leaders. The Phoenix represent Elon University in the NCAA's Colonial Athletic Association.

Elon began competing in intercollegiate basketball in 1911. However, the school's record book does not generally list records from before the 1950s, as records from before this period are often incomplete and inconsistent. Since scoring was much lower in this era, and teams played much fewer games during a typical season, it is likely that few or no players from this era would appear on these lists anyway.

The NCAA did not officially record assists as a stat until the 1983–84 season, and blocks and steals until the 1985–86 season, but Elon's record books includes players in these stats before these seasons. These lists are updated through the end of the 2020–21 season.

== Scoring ==
Career
Rk	Player	Points	Seasons
1	Jesse Branson	2,241	1961–62 1962–63 1963–64 1964–65
2	Tommy Cole	2,214	1968–69 1969–70 1970–71 1971–72
3	Henry Goedeck	1,995	1965–66 1966–67 1967–68 1968–69
4	Lee Allison	1,941	1977–78 1978–79 1979–80 1980–81
5	Dee Atkinson	1,799	1951–52 1952–53 1955–56 1956–57
6	Tyler Seibring	1,794	2015–16 2016–17 2017–18 2018–19
7	Larry Trautwein	1,738	1969–70 1970–71 1971–72 1972–73
8	Ben Kendall	1,653	1950–51 1951–52 1952–53 1955–56
9	Brendon Rowell	1,629	1998–99 1999–00 2000–01 2001–02
10	Lucas Troutman	1,626	2010–11 2011–12 2012–13 2013–14

Season
Rk	Player	Points	Season
1	Jesse Branson	780	1964–65
2	Clarence “Diffy” Ross	699	1973–74
3	Jesse Branson	675	1961–62
4	Tommy Cole	672	1970–71
5	Tommy Cole	642	1969–70
6	W. Massenburg	635	1989–90
7	S.J. "Jug" Irvin	632	1960–61
	Chandler Cuthrell	632	2025–26
9	Marcus Sheffield	627	2019–20
10	Dewey Andrew	615	1961–62

Single game
Rk	Player	Points	Season	Opponent
1	Jesse Branson	44	1963–64	Wofford

== Rebounds ==
Career
Rk	Player	Rebounds	Seasons
1	Jesse Branson	1,689	1961–62 1962–63 1963–64 1964–65
2	Ed Juratic	1,480	1954–55 1955–56 1956–57
3	Larry Trautwein	1,446	1969–70 1970–71 1971–72 1972–73
4	Dee Atkinson	1,215	1951–52 1952–53 1955–56 1956–57
5	Clarence “Diffy” Ross	1,194	1970–71 1971–72 1972–73 1973–74
6	Henry Goedeck	1,128	1965–66 1966–67 1967–68 1968–69
7	Thomas Moore	1,069	1972–73 1973–74 1974–75 1975–76
8	Bill Bowes	1,063	1965–66 1966–67 1967–68 1968–69
9	Dewey Andrew	860	1959–60 1960–61 1961–62 1962–63
10	Tyler Seibring	779	2015–16 2016–17 2017–18 2018–19

Season
Rk	Player	Rebounds	Season
1	Ed Juratic	550	1955–56
2	Jesse Branson	464	1964–65
3	Jesse Branson	459	1961–62
	Clarence “Diffy” Ross	459	1973–74
5	Jesse Branson	439	1963–64
6	Larry Trautwein	425	1970–71
7	Larry Trautwein	401	1971–72
8	Henry Goedeck	360	1966–67
9	Larry Trautwein	351	1972–73
10	Clarence “Diffy” Ross	348	1971–72

Single game
Rk	Player	Rebounds	Season	Opponent
1	Jesse Branson	27	1964–65	Loyola
	Larry Trautwein	27	1970–71	North Carolina A&T
	Charlie Williamson	27	1976–77	Atl. Christian

== Assists ==
Career
Rk	Player	Assists	Seasons
1	Tommy Cole	705	1968–69 1969–70 1970–71 1971–72
2	Chris Long	528	2007–08 2008–09 2009–10 2010–11
3	Seth Chambless	433	1993–94 1994–95 1995–96 1996–97
4	Scottie Rice	361	2002–03 2003–04 2004–05 2005–06
5	Montell Watson	329	2003–04 2004–05 2005–06 2007–08
6	Wes Jones	322	1987–88 1988–89 1989–90 1990–91
7	Brendon Rowell	303	1998–99 1999–00 2000–01 2001–02
8	Ross Sims	296	1999–00 2000–01 2001–02 2002–03
	Luke Eddy	296	2013–14 2014–15 2015–16 2016–17
10	Jack Isenbarger	290	2010–11 2011–12 2012–13 2013–14

Season
Rk	Player	Assists	Season
1	Duke Madsen	220	1975–76
2	Chris Long	188	2010–11
3	Tommy Cole	187	1969–70
4	Tommy Cole	177	1968–69
5	Tommy Cole	175	1970–71
6	Tommy Cole	166	1971–72
7	Ricky Larry	163	1984–85
8	Seth Chambless	147	1995–96
9	Wes Jones	146	1989–90
10	Luke Eddy	144	2015–16

== Steals ==
Career
Rk	Player	Steals	Seasons
1	Scottie Rice	212	2002–03 2003–04 2004–05 2005–06
2	Brendon Rowell	206	1998–99 1999–00 2000–01 2001–02
3	Seth Chambless	177	1993–94 1994–95 1995–96 1996–97
4	Montell Watson	164	2003–04 2004–05 2005–06 2007–08
5	Chris Long	155	2007–08 2008–09 2009–10 2010–11
6	Mel Melton	151	1981–82 1982–83 1983–84
7	Eric Blair	150	1984–85 1985–86 1986–87 1987–88
8	Adam Roberts	148	1994–95 1995–96 1996–97 1997–98
9	Tanner Samson	133	2012–13 2013–14 2014–15 2015–16
10	Al Beck	132	1981–82 1982–83

Season
Rk	Player	Steals	Season
1	Mel Melton	80	1981–82
	Drew Van Horn	80	1981–82
3	Al Beck	72	1982–83
4	William Massenburg	71	1989–90
5	Ricky Larry	62	1984–85
6	Al Beck	60	1981–82
7	Brendon Rowell	59	1998–99
8	Seth Chambless	58	1995–96
9	Adam Roberts	57	1997–98

== Blocks ==
Career
Rk	Player	Blocks	Seasons
1	Lucas Troutman	213	2010–11 2011–12 2012–13 2013–14
2	Eric Hairston	142	1983–84 1984–85 1985–86 1986–87
3	Bernard Torain	132	1984–85 1985–86 1986–87 1987–88
4	Joel Sargent	108	1995–96 1996–97
	Brett James	108	2005–06 2006–07 2007–08 2008–09
6	Desmond Knowles	92	1989–90 1990–91 1991–92 1992–93
7	Adam Constantine	83	2006–07 2007–08 2008–09 2009–10
8	Tyler Seibring	81	2015–16 2016–17 2017–18 2018–19
9	Sam Sherry	80	2021–22 2022–23 2023–24 2024–25
10	Shamar Johnson	77	1999–2000 2000–01 2001–02 2002–03

Season
Rk	Player	Blocks	Season
1	Matthew Van Komen	75	2024–25
2	Lucas Troutman	64	2012–13
3	Lucas Troutman	58	2013–14
4	Joel Sargent	55	1996–97
5	Joel Sargent	53	1995–96
6	Bernard Torain	50	1985–86
7	Eric Hairston	49	1985–86
8	Lucas Troutman	47	2010–11
9	Tony Kitt	46	1995–96
10	Eric Hairston	44	1984–85
	Adam Constantine	44	2009–10
	Lucas Troutman	44	2011–12
