= Henry St. George Tucker =

Henry St. George Tucker may refer to:

- Henry St George Tucker (financier) (1771–1851), Bermudian financier and official of the East India Company
- Henry St. George Tucker Sr. (1780–1848), U.S. representative from Virginia
- Henry St. George Tucker Jr. (1828–1863), son of Henry St. George Tucker Sr., after whom St. George, West Virginia, is named
- Henry St. George Tucker III (1853–1932), U.S. representative from Virginia
- Henry St. George Tucker (bishop) (1874–1959), bishop of the Episcopal Church in the United States
- SS Henry St. George Tucker, a Liberty ship, named after Henry St. George Tucker Sr.

== See also ==
- George Tucker (disambiguation)
