= Jerry Tolley =

American football coach, educator, and politician (born 1942)

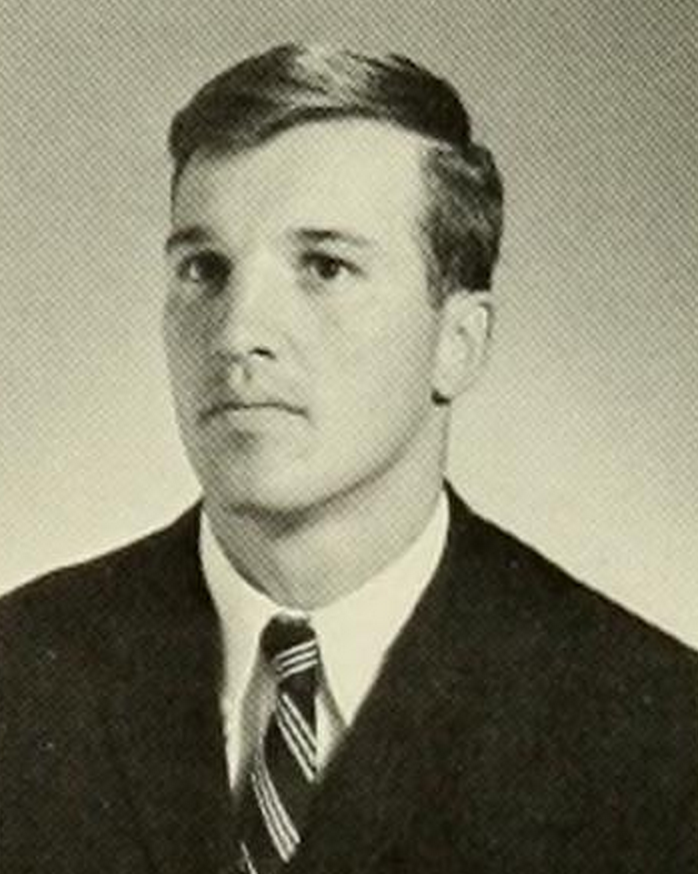
- Tolley pictured in Phi Psi Cli 1968, Elon yearbook

Biographical details
- Born: November 6, 1942 (age 83); Goldsboro, North Carolina, U.S.

Playing career
- 1962–1964: East Carolina
- Position: Wingback

Coaching career (HC unless noted)
- 1966: Fayetteville HS (NC) (assistant)
- 1967–1976: Elon (assistant)
- 1977–1981: Elon

Head coaching record
- Overall: 49–11–2
- Tournaments: 8–1 (NAIA D-I playoffs)

Accomplishments and honors

Championships
- 2 NAIA Division I National (1980–1981); 4 SAC (1977–1978, 1980–1981)

Awards
- NAIA Division I Coach of the Year (1980)

Jerry Russell Tolley (born November 6, 1942) is an American former football coach, educator, and politician. He served as the head football coach at Elon University from 1977 to 1981, compiling a record of 49–11–2. His 1980 and 1981 teams were both crowned NAIA national champions. He graduated from East Carolina University with a master's degree in education in 1966. He also received his Ph.D from University of North Carolina at Greensboro in 1982.

Tolley formerly served as the mayor of Elon, North Carolina.

== Head coaching record ==
Year	Team	Overall	Conference	Standing	Bowl/playoffs
Elon Fightin' Christians (South Atlantic Conference) (1977–1981)
1977	Elon	9–2	6–1	1st	
1978	Elon	11–2–1	6–0–1	T–1st	L NAIA Division I Championship
1979	Elon	5–5	3–4	T–4th	
1980	Elon	13–1	6–1	T–1st	W NAIA Division I Championship
1981	Elon	11–1–1	6–1	1st	W NAIA Division I Championship
Elon:		49–11–2	27–7–1		
Total:		49–11–2			
National championship Conference title Conference division title or championship game berth
