= Travian Robertson =

American football player and coach (born 1988)

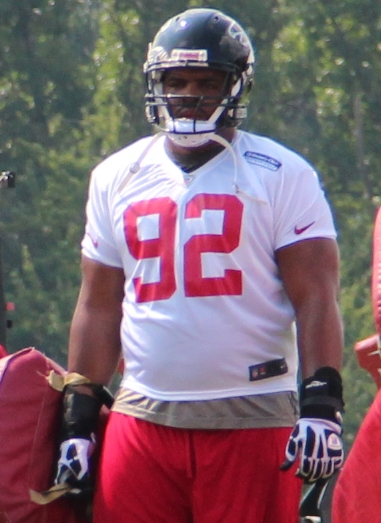
- Robertson in 2013

Current position
- Title: Defensive line coach
- Team: South Carolina
- Conference: SEC

Biographical details
- Born: December 9, 1988 (age 37); Laurinburg, North Carolina

Playing career
- 2003–2006: Scotland HS
- 2007–2011: South Carolina
- 2012–2014: Atlanta Falcons
- 2014: Seattle Seahawks
- 2014: Washington Redskins
- Position: Defensive end

Coaching career (HC unless noted)
- 2017: Georgia State (GA)
- 2018: Albany State (DL)
- 2019–2021: Georgia State (DL)
- 2022: Tulane (DL)
- 2023–present: South Carolina (DL)

Travian Jamal Robertson (born December 9, 1988) is an American football coach and former defensive end who currently serves as the defensive line coach for University of South Carolina. He was selected in the seventh round, 249th overall, by the Atlanta Falcons in the 2012 NFL draft. He played college football at South Carolina.

== Early life ==
A native of Laurinburg, North Carolina, Robertson attended Scotland High School, where he was teammates with Terrell Manning. After missing much of his junior season due to a torn ACL, Robertson recorded 74 tackles with 7.5 sacks, two fumble recoveries and four forced fumbles as senior, earning him all-conference, all-region and team Defensive MVP honors. Scotland High reached the playoffs for three straight seasons.

Regarded as a four-star recruit by Rivals.com, Robertson was ranked as the No. 8 strongside defensive end prospect in his class. He chose South Carolina over offers from North Carolina, Clemson, North Carolina State, and Virginia Tech.

== College career ==
As a true freshman in 2007, Robertson played in all 12 games. He was the only true freshman in the starting lineup for the season-opener against Louisiana–Lafayette. For the season, Robertson was credited with seven tackles, including four solo stops, a pass break up and a quarterback hurry.

In his sophomore season, Robertson played in all 13 games and collected 17 tackles, including a pair of tackles for loss. He had a career-high six tackles, including a tackle for loss against Clemson. Four weeks into his junior season, Robertson suffered a season-ending right knee injury against Ole Miss. He received a medical redshirt season to regain the year of eligibility.

Returning from injury in 2010, Robertson started all 14 games and had 42 tackles, including 10.0 for loss and 4.0 sacks. He had five stops in the 2010 Chick-fil-A Bowl against Florida State. Robertson finished his career as a fifth-year senior, with 45 tackles, 24 of those for a loss, and 8 sacks in 2011.

== Professional career ==
Pre-draft measurables
Height	Weight	Arm length	Hand span	40-yard dash	Vertical jump	Broad jump	Bench press
6 ft 4 in (1.93 m)	302 lb (137 kg)	32 1/4	10 1/8	5.32 s	26 in (0.66 m)	8 ft 6 in (2.59 m)	30 reps
All value from NFL Combine.

=== Atlanta Falcons ===
While projected to be a fifth-round selection by Sports Illustrated, as well as being ranked as the fifteenth best defensive tackle available in the 2012 NFL draft, Robertson was selected in the seventh round, 249th overall, by the Atlanta Falcons. He was the last of six South Carolina Gamecocks selected in this draft class, after Stephon Gilmore, Melvin Ingram, Alshon Jeffery, Rokevious Watkins, and Antonio Allen.

The Falcons signed Robertson to their practice squad on August 31, 2014.

=== Seattle Seahawks ===
The Seattle Seahawks signed Robertson off the Falcons' practice squad on November 18, 2014. On December 26, the Seahawks waived him.

=== Washington Redskins ===
Robertson was claimed off waivers on December 27, 2014.

On September 5, 2015, Robertson was waived for final roster cuts before the start of the regular season.
