= R. J. Rummel =

American political scientist (1932–2014)

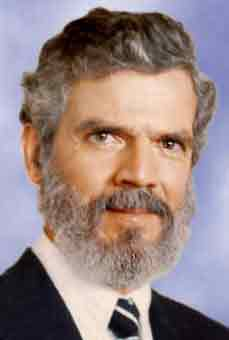
- Born: Rudolph Joseph Rummel; October 21, 1932; Cleveland, Ohio, U.S.
- Died: March 2, 2014 (aged 81); Kaneohe, Hawaii, U.S.
- Education: University of Hawaiʻi; (BA, political science, 1959); (MA, political science, 1961); Northwestern University; (PhD, political science, 1963)
- Occupation: Political scientist
- Employers: Indiana University (1963–1964); Yale University (1964–1966); University of Hawaiʻi (1966–1995)
- Known for: Research on war and conflict resolution
- Website: hawaii.edu/powerkills

Rudolph Joseph Rummel (October 21, 1932 – March 2, 2014) was an American political scientist, a statistician and professor at Indiana University, Yale University, and University of Hawaiʻi at Mānoa. He spent his career studying data on collective violence and war with a view toward helping their resolution or elimination. Contrasting genocide, Rummel coined the term democide for murder by government, such as the genocide of indigenous peoples and colonialism, Nazi Germany, the Stalinist purges, Mao Zedong's Cultural Revolution, and other authoritarian, totalitarian, or undemocratic regimes, coming to the conclusion that democratic regimes result in the least democides.

Rummel estimated that a total of 212 million people were killed by all governments during the 20th century, of which 148 million were killed by Communist governments from 1917 to 1987. To give some perspective on these numbers, Rummel stated that all domestic and foreign wars during the 20th century killed in combat around 41 million. His figures for Communist governments have been criticized for the methodology which he used to arrive at them, and they have also been criticized for being higher than the figures which have been given by most scholars. In his last book, Rummel increased his estimate to over 272 million innocent, non-combatant civilians who were murdered by their own governments during the 20th century. Rummel stated that his 272 million death estimate was his lower, more prudent figure, stating that it "could be over 400,000,000." Rummel came to the conclusion that a democracy is the form of government which is least likely to kill its citizens because democracies do not tend to wage wars against each other. This latest view is a concept, which was further developed by Rummel, known as the democratic peace theory.

Rummel was the author of twenty-four scholarly books, and he published his major results between 1975 and 1981 in Understanding Conflict and War (1975). He spent the next fifteen years refining the underlying theory and testing it empirically on new data, against the empirical results of others, and on case studies. He summed up his research in Power Kills (1997). His other works include Lethal Politics: Soviet Genocides and Mass Murders 1917–1987 (1990), China's Bloody Century: Genocide and Mass Murder Since 1900 (1991), Democide: Nazi Genocide and Mass Murder (1992), Death by Government: Genocide and Mass Murder Since 1900 (1994), and Statistics of Democide (1997). Extracts, figures, and tables from the books, including his sources and details regarding the calculations, are available online on his website. Rummel also authored Applied Factor Analysis (1970) and Understanding Correlation (1976).

== Early life, education, and death ==
Rummel was born in 1932 in Cleveland, Ohio, to a family of German descent. A child of the Great Depression and World War II, he attended local public schools. Rummel received his Bachelor of Arts and Master of Arts from the University of Hawaiʻi in 1959 and 1961, respectively, and his PhD in political science from Northwestern University in 1963.

Rummel died on March 2, 2014, aged 81. He is survived by two daughters and one sister.

== Academic career and research ==
Rummel began his teaching career at Indiana University. In 1964, Rummel moved to Yale University, and in 1966 returned to the University of Hawaiʻi at Mānoa, where he taught for the rest of his active career. In 1995, Rummel retired and became professor emeritus of political science. His research was supported by grants from the National Science Foundation, DARPA, and the United States Peace Research Institute. In addition to his books, Rummel was the author of more than 100 professional articles.

Rummel was a member of the advisory council of the Victims of Communism Memorial Foundation.

=== Democide ===
Rummel coined democide, which he defined as "the murder of any person or people by a government, including genocide, politicide, and mass murder." Rummel further stated to "use the civil definition of murder, where someone can be guilty of murder if they are responsible in a reckless and wanton way for the loss of life, as in incarcerating people in camps where they may soon die of malnutrition, unattended disease, and forced labor, or deporting them into wastelands where they may die rapidly from exposure and disease."

In his work and research, Rummel distinguished between colonial, democratic, and authoritarian and totalitarian regimes, and found a correlation with authoritarianism and totalitarianism, which he considered to be a significant causative factor in democides. Rummel posited that there is a relation between political power and democide. Political mass murder grows increasingly common as political power becomes unconstrained. At the other end of the scale, where power is diffuse, checked, and balanced, political violence is a rarity. For Rummel, "[t]he more power a regime has, the more likely people will be killed. This is a major reason for promoting freedom." He wrote that "concentrated political power is the most dangerous thing on earth." This correlation is considered by Rummel to be more important than reliability of estimates.

=== Democracy and peace ===
After Dean Babst, Rummel was one of the early researchers on the democratic peace theory. Rummel found that there were 205 wars between non-democracies, 166 wars between non-democracies and democracies, and no wars between democracies during the period between 1816 and 2005. The definition of democracy used by Rummel is "where those who hold power are elected in competitive elections with a secret ballot and wide franchise (loosely understood as including at least 2/3 of adult males); where there is freedom of speech, religion, and organization; and a constitutional framework of law to which the government is subordinate and that guarantees equal rights." In addition, it should be "well-established", stating that "enough time has passed since its inception for peace-sufficient democratic procedures to become accepted and democratic culture to settle in. Around three years seems to be enough for this."

Regarding war, Rummel adopted the definition of a popular database, namely that war is a conflict causing at least 1,000 battle deaths. The peace is explained thus: "Start with the answer of the philosopher Immanuel Kant to why universalizing republics (democracy was a bad word for Classical Liberals in his time) would create a peaceful world. People would not support and vote for wars in which they and their loved ones could die and lose their property. But this is only partly correct, for the people can get aroused against nondemocracies and push their leaders toward war, as in the Spanish–American War. A deeper explanation is that where people are free, they create an exchange society of overlapping groups and multiple and crosschecking centers of power. In such a society a culture of negotiation, tolerance, and splitting differences develops. Moreover, free people develop an in-group orientation toward other such societies, a feeling of shared norms and ideals that militates against violence toward other free societies."

=== Mortacide ===
While democide requires governmental intention, Rummel was also interested in analyzing the effects of regimes that unintentionally, yet culpably, cause the deaths of their citizens through negligence, incompetence or sheer indifference. An example is a regime in which corruption has become so pervasive and destructive of a people's welfare that it threatens their daily lives and reduces their life expectancy. Rummel termed deaths of citizens under such regimes as mortacide, and posited that democracies have the fewest of such deaths.

=== Famine, economic growth, and happiness ===
Rummel included famine in democide, if he deemed it the result of a deliberate policy, as he did for the Holodomor. Rummel stated that there have been no famines in democracies, deliberate or not, an argument first advanced by Amartya Sen, and he also posited that democracy is an important factor for economic growth and for raising living standards. He stated that research shows average happiness in a nation increases with more democracy. According to Rummel, the continuing increase in the number of democracies worldwide would lead to an end to wars and democide. He believed that goal might be achieved by the mid-21st century.

== Political views ==
Rummel started out as a democratic socialist but later became an anti-communist, a libertarian, and an advocate of economic liberalism. Apart from being an outspoken critic of communism and Communist states, (Note: Rummel considered communism to be a significant causative factor in democides. According to Rummel, the killings committed by Communist states can best be explained as the result of the marriage between absolute power and the ideology of Marxism, which he also considered to be absolutist. Rummel wrote that "communism was like a fanatical religion. It had its revealed text and its chief interpreters. It had its priests and their ritualistic prose with all the answers. It had a heaven, and the proper behavior to reach it. It had its appeal to faith. And it had its crusades against nonbelievers. What made this secular religion so utterly lethal was its seizure of all the state's instruments of force and coercion and their immediate use to destroy or control all independent sources of power, such as the church, the professions, private businesses, schools, and the family." Rummel said that Communists saw the construction of their utopia as "though a war on poverty, exploitation, imperialism and inequality. And for the greater good, as in a real war, people are killed. And, thus, this war for the communist utopia had its necessary enemy casualties, the clergy, bourgeoisie, capitalists, wreckers, counterrevolutionaries, rightists, tyrants, rich, landlords, and noncombatants that unfortunately got caught in the battle. In a war millions may die, but the cause may be well justified, as in the defeat of Hitler and an utterly racist Nazism. And to many communists, the cause of a communist utopia was such as to justify all the deaths.") Rummel criticized right-wing dictatorships and the democides that occurred under colonialism, which also resulted in hundreds of million of deaths. Rummel was a strong supporter of spreading liberal democracy, although he did not support invading another country solely to replace a dictatorship. Rummel posited that there is less foreign violence when states are more libertarian.

Rummel was critical of past American foreign policy such as the Philippine War of 1899–1902, involvement in the 1900 Battle of Peking, and the strategic bombing of civilians during World War II, and he also believed that the United States under the Democratic Party US president Woodrow Wilson was a domestic tyranny. Rummel strongly supported the war on terror and the Iraq War initiated by the Republican George W. Bush administration, arguing that "the media [was] biased against freeing Iraqi from tyranny." Rummel also proposed that an intergovernmental organization of all democracies outside of the United Nations deals with issues about which the United Nations cannot or would not act, in particular to further the promotion of peace, human security, human rights, and democracy through what he termed "an Alliance of Democracies [which] can do much better." Rummel thought that Democratic United States senator Ted Kennedy's opposition to the Vietnam War led to the state killings in Cambodia and Vietnam during the 1970s. Following the death of Kennedy, Rummel condemned the media reaction as too benign, and stated that "the post-war blood of millions is on Kennedy's hands."

Rummel was critical of Barack Obama and the Democratic Party, alleging that they were seeking to establish an authoritarian, one-party state. He believed that global warming was "a scam for power" and opposed Obama's carbon-trading scheme. Rummel thought that Obama killed off a democratic peace that Democrat Bill Clinton and Republican George W. Bush had been pursuing. Rummel posited that there was a leftist bias in some parts of the academic world that selectively focused on problems in nations with high political and economic freedom and ignored much worse problems in other nations. Related to this, he also criticized the tenure system.

== Reception ==
=== Democratic peace theory ===
The democratic peace theory is one of the great controversies in political science and one of the main challenges to realism in international relations. More than a hundred different researchers have published multiple articles in this field according to an incomplete bibliography until 2000, and from 2000 to August 2009. Some critics respond that there have been exceptions to the theory. While it is generally statistically true that democides happen more in authoritarian than democratic regimes, there have been a few exceptions for democratic regimes, and some authoritarian regimes have not engaged in the megamurder category of democide. Rummel discussed some of these exceptions in his FAQ, and he has referred to books by other scholars such as Never at War. Criticism of the democratic peace theory include data, definition, historical periods, limited consequences, methodology, microfoundations, and statistical significance criticism, that peace comes before democracy, and several studies fail to confirm democracies are less likely to wage war than autocracies if wars against non-democracies are included. Jeffrey Pugh summarized that those who dispute the theory often do so on grounds that it conflates correlation with causation, and the academic definitions of democracy and war can be manipulated so as to manufacture an artificial trend. Rummel's first work on democratic peace received little attention. His results were incorporated in a "gigantic philosophical scheme" of 33 propositions in a five-volume work. It was reviewed in 1992 as having "immoderate pretensions", and demonstrated Rummel's "unrelenting" economic liberalism and "extreme" views on defense policy. Nils Petter Gleditsch said that these elements may have distracted readers from Rummel's more conventionally acceptable propositions.

Rummel's version of the democratic peace theory has some distinctive features disputed by some other researchers who support the existence and explanatory power of the theory. Rummel's early research found that democracies are less warlike, even against non-democracies; other researchers hold only that democracies are far less warlike with one another. Rummel held that democracies properly defined never go to war with each other, and added that this is an "absolute or (point) claim." Other researchers such as Stuart A. Bremer found that it is a chance or stochastic matter; in this sense, Rummel's version of the democratic peace theory was deterministic. A review by James Lee Ray cited several other studies finding that the increase in the risk of war in democratizing countries happens only if many or most of the surrounding nations are undemocratic. If wars between young democracies are included in the analysis, several studies and reviews still find enough evidence supporting the stronger claim that all democracies, whether young or established, go into war with one another less frequently, while some do not.

Rummel did not always apply his definition of democracy to governments under discussion, and he did not always clarify when he did not apply it. The opening paragraphs of an appendix from his book Power Kills adopt Michael Doyle's lists of liberal democracies for 1776–1800 and 1800–1850. Doyle used a much looser definition, namely the secret ballot that was first adopted by Tasmania in 1856, while Belgium had barely 10% adult male suffrage before 1894.

=== Factor analysis ===
Critical reviews of Rummel's estimates have focused on two aspects, namely his choice of data sources and his statistical approach. Historical sources Rummel based his estimates upon can rarely serve as sources of reliable figures. The statistical approach Rummel used to analyze big sets of diverse estimates may lead to dilution of useful data with noisy ones. Rummel and other genocide scholars are focused primarily on establishing patterns and testing various theoretical explanations of genocides and mass killings. In their work, as they are dealing with large data sets that describe mass mortality events globally, they have to rely on selective data provided by country experts, so precise estimates are neither a required nor expected result of their work. Yehuda Bauer, noted scholar of the Holocaust who commented that democide is more appropriate to describe mass atrocities perpetrated by state actors than genocide, wrote in Rethinking the Holocaust: "Rummel has been criticized for exaggerating the losses. Even if the criticisms were valid, a figure lower by 10 or 20 or even 30 percent would make absolutely no difference to the general conclusions that Rummel draws."

=== Criticism of specific estimates ===
Rummel's works have been criticized for establishing estimates on hearsay and unverifiable overly high death estimates from highly biased authors. An example of this is in the Tito's Slaughterhouse chapter of Statistics of Democide, where Rummel quotes estimates for the democide record of Tito's Yugoslavia from authors who were sympathetic towards the Independent State of Croatia (NDH) and who attempted to downplay or deny the crimes of Ustaše in the Holocaust in the Independent State of Croatia, an example of those authors being Ivo Omrčanin, a former NDH official in foreign ministry and an espouser of fascist ideals.

Edward J. M. Rhoads cited as inaccurate Rummel's description of the 1911 Revolution in China as a "very minor affair ... no more than 1,000 to 2,000 died," citing a death toll multiple times the number 2,000 among the Manchu ethnic minority. According to Sara M. Butler: "Rummel claims that 350,000 Jews were killed in the Spanish Inquisition, which is 1.7 times higher than the actual Jewish population of Spain at that time."

Jonathan Smele referred to Rummel's Lethal Politics: Soviet Genocide and Mass Murder since 1917 as "A poorly researched, obsessively anti-Soviet polemical general survey."

In historian William Rubinstein's opinion, almost all of Rummel's estimated numbers were false.

== Awards and nominations ==
In 1999, Rummel was awarded the Susan Strange Award of the International Studies Association. This award recognizes a person "whose singular intellect, assertiveness, and insight most challenge conventional wisdom and intellectual and organizational complacency in the international studies community." In 2003, Rummel was given The Lifetime Achievement Award from the Conflict Processes Organized Section of the American Political Science Association for "scholarly contributions that have fundamentally improved the study of conflict processes."

Rummel used to publicly claim that he was a finalist for the Nobel Peace Prize, based on an Associated Press report reprinted in his local paper about an alleged Nobel short list of 117 names. Although he retracted the claim, it still appeared in one of his books. Rummel was nominated multiple times for the Nobel Peace Prize by Per Ahlmark but no shortlist has been made public.

== Never Again series ==
Rummel wrote the Never Again series of alternative-history novels. According to the series' website, Never Again is "a what-if, alternative history" in which "two lovers are sent back in time to 1906 with modern weapons and 38 billion 1906 dollars" in order to prevent the rise of totalitarianism and the outbreak of world wars. (Note: Rummel wrote: "What if there were a solution to war and genocide? What if a secret society sent back to 1906 two lovers, Joy Phim, a gorgeous warrior, and John Banks, a pacifist professor of history, and gave them the incredible wealth and weapons necessary to create a peaceful alternative universe—one that never experienced the horrors of world war, the Holocaust, and the other atrocities of the twentieth century? And what if, at great personal cost, they succeed too well and create a peaceful world of complacent democracies? In Book 2, the clock is turned back to their arrival in 1906. They receive a message from the future of the universe they will create – Islamic fundamentalists have attacked the unarmed democracies with nuclear weapons and enslaved them. It is now up to these lovers to prevent this horrible future.)

== Published works ==
Most books and articles by Rummel are available for free download at his Freedom, Democide, War website, including those not listed here.

=== Books ===
- Dimensions of Nations, SAGE Publications, 1972
- Wilkenfeld, J., ed. Conflict Behavior & Linkage Politics (contributor), David McKay, 1973
- Peace Endangered: Reality of Détente, SAGE Publications, 1976
- Understanding Conflict and War, John Wiley & Sons, 1976
- Conflict in Perspective (Understanding Conflict and War), SAGE Publications, 1977
- Field Theory Evolving, SAGE Publications, 1977
- Der gefährdete Frieden. Die militärische Überlegenheit der UdSSR ("Endangered Peace. The Military Superiority of the USSR"), München, 1977
- National Attitudes and Behaviors (with G. Omen, S. W. Rhee, and P. Sybinsky), SAGE Publications, 1979
- In the Minds of Men. Principles Toward Understanding and Waging Peace, Sogang University Press, 1984
- Applied Factor Analysis, Northwestern University Press, 1988
- Lethal Politics: Soviet Genocide and Mass Murder since 1917, Transaction Publishers, 1990
- China's Bloody Century: Genocide and Mass Murder Since 1900, Transaction Publishers, 1991
- The Conflict Helix: Principles & Practices of Interpersonal, Social & International Conflict & Cooperation, Transaction Publishers, 1991
- Democide: Nazi Genocide and Mass Murder, Transaction Publishers, 1992
- Death by Government, Transaction Publishers, 1997
- Statistics of Democide: Genocide and Mass Murder Since 1900, Lit Verlag, 1999
- Power Kills: Democracy as a Method of Nonviolence, Transaction Publishers, 2002
- Never Again (series)
1. War and Democide, Llumina Press, 2004
2. Nuclear Holocaust, Llumina Press, 2004
3. Reset, Llumina Press, 2004
4. Red Terror, Llumina Press, 2004
5. Genocide, Llumina Press, 2005
6. Never Again?, Llumina Press, 2005

Never Again: Ending War, Democide, & Famine Through Democratic Freedom, nonfiction supplement, Llumina Press, 2005

- The Blue Book of Freedom: Ending Famine, Poverty, Democide, and War, Cumberland House Publishing, 2007

=== Scholarly articles ===
Rummel had approximately 100 publications in peer-reviewed journals, including:

- International Journal on World Peace, October–December 1986, III (4), contributor
- Journal of International Relations, Spring 1978, 3 (1), contributor
- Reason, July 1977, 9 (3), "The Problem of Defense", contributor

== See also ==
- Casualty recording
- Stéphane Courtois

== Bibliography ==
- Gleditsch, Nils Petter, ed. (2017). "R.J. Rummel—A Multi-faceted Scholar". R.J. Rummel: An Assessment of His Many Contributions. SpringerBriefs on Pioneers in Science and Practice. Vol. 37. New York City, New York: Springer. pp. 1–16. doi:10.1007/978-3-319-54463-2_1. ISBN 9783319544632.
- Peterson, H. C. (2017). "Regime Type Matters". In Gleditsch, Nils Petter (ed.). R.J. Rummel: An Assessment of His Many Contributions. SpringerBriefs on Pioneers in Science and Practice. Vol. 37. New York City, New York: Springer. pp. 97–106. doi:10.1007/978-3-319-54463-2_10. ISBN 9783319544632.
