= Lethal Politics =

1990 book by Rudolph Rummel

Lethal Politics: Soviet Genocide and Mass Murder since 1917
- Author: Rudolph Rummel
- Subject: Communism, Soviet Union, Totalitarianism, Genocide
- Genre: Political history
- Publisher: Transaction Publishers
- Publication date: 1990
- Publication place: United States
- Pages: 268
- ISBN: 0-88738-333-5

Lethal Politics: Soviet Genocide and Mass Murder since 1917 is a book by Rudolph Rummel, published by Transaction Publishers in 1990. The book examines genocides and mass murders perpetrated by the Soviet regime from the days of Vladimir Lenin until the last years of the Cold War, with an emphasis on the Joseph Stalin regime.

Rummel's central theory was that citizens of totalitarian, especially Communist state systems, were most likely to be killed by their government, whereas "democratic systems provide a path to peace, and universalizing them would eliminate war and minimize global, political violence."

== Bibliography ==
- Rudolph Rummel (1990). Lethal Politics: Soviet Genocide and Mass Murder since 1917, New Brunswick, Transaction Publishers, ISBN 0-88738-333-5, ISBN 1-56000-887-3
