= Connie Ledoux Book =

American academic

Connie Book

9th President of Elon University
- Incumbent
- Assumed office March 1, 2018
- Preceded by: Leo Lambert

Provost and Dean of Academic Affairs for the Citadel
- In office July 1, 2015 – March 1, 2018
- Preceded by: Samuel M. Hines
- Succeeded by: Sally Selden

Personal details
- Education: Louisiana State University; Northwestern State University; University of Georgia

Military service
- Allegiance: United States
- Branch/service: South Carolina National Guard
- Rank: Brigadier General (Note: The Citadel provost is awarded the rank of brigadier general and becomes a member of the national guard and militia.)
- Commands: The Citadel

Constance "Connie" Ledoux Book is an American academic who is President of Elon University, a private university in Elon, North Carolina. On October 9, 2017, the Elon Board of Trustees voted unanimously to elect Book as the ninth president of Elon. She became president on March 1, 2018. Prior to her appointment as President of Elon, Book served for two years as the first female Provost and Dean of Academic Affairs at The Citadel, The Military College of South Carolina.

== Early life and education ==
Book is the granddaughter of farmers from Louisiana.

Book received her B.J. degree from Manship School of Journalism, Louisiana State University in 1986. She received her M.Ed. in Education Administration and Supervision from Northwestern State University in 1989. Book received her Ph.D. in 1993 from Grady College of Journalism at the University of Georgia. Her dissertation was titled "Municipal Officials' Attitudes toward Cable Television Regulation: A National Study."

== Career ==
Book served as Assistant Professor of Communications at Georgia College & State University from 1993 to 1996. She served as Visiting Professor of Communications at North Carolina State University in 1996–1997 and Assistant Professor of Communications at Meredith College from 1997 to 1999. She began teaching at Elon University in 1999 and became Associate Provost at Elon in 2010. She became Provost and Dean at The Citadel in 2015 and then was named President of Elon in 2018.

Under Book's leadership in 2019, Elon University was recognized as a top-100 National University and as second among national universities for best undergraduate teaching.

Book has been noted for her defense of the Deferred Action for Childhood Arrivals (DACA) policy.

== Recognition ==
In 2009, Book received the Outstanding Service and Leadership Award from the North Carolina Association of Broadcasters as well as Elon University's Ward Family Excellence in Mentoring Award.

== See also ==
- List of presidents of Elon University
