= Lee County High School (Sanford, North Carolina) =

American public school in North Carolina

Location
- 1708 Nash Street; Sanford, North Carolina 27330; United States; 35°28′00″N 79°08′53″W

Information
- Former names: Sanford Central High School (1951–1977)
- Type: Public
- Established: 1951 (75 years ago)
- School district: Lee County Schools
- CEEB code: 343518
- Principal: Betsy Bridges
- Faculty: 175
- Teaching staff: 88.05 (FTE)
- Grades: 9–12
- Enrollment: 1,469 (2023–2024)
- Student to teacher ratio: 16.68
- Campus: Urban
- Colors: Blue and Vegas gold
- Team name: Yellow Jackets
- Rival: Southern Lee High School
- Yearbook: Sandprints
- Website: www.lee.k12.nc.us/o/lchs

Lee County High School is one of four high schools in Sanford, North Carolina, United States. The high school is located on 1708 Nash Street in Sanford and serves grades 9–12. The school mascot is the yellow jacket and the school's colors are blue and Vegas gold.

== History ==
The school first opened under the name of "Sanford Central High School" in 1951. It was an all-white school. In 1966, Sanford Central was integrated. In 1977, the school's name was changed to "Lee County Senior High School" and served grades 10–12. In the fall of 1992, Lee County Schools reorganized its grade configuration to elementary (K–5), middle school (6–8), and high school (9–12).

For years, Lee County High School was the only high school in Sanford and Lee County. As Lee County grew, the high school grew as well, enrolling at one point over 2,700 students, making it one of the largest high schools in North Carolina during the early 2000s. It was decided that another high school should be built in the county, and in November 2003, ground was broken on Tramway Road in Sanford. On August 25, 2005, Southern Lee High School opened. It served grades 9–11 during the 2005–2006 school year, with 12th grade being added in the 2006–2007 school year. The Class of 2007 was the first class to graduate from the new Southern Lee High School.

Since the opening of Southern Lee High, it has become a major rival with Lee County High in sports. Other major rivals are Western Harnett High and Apex High.

== School information ==
The school operates on a 4×4 block schedule (90 minute classes/30 minute lunch). The school district is mainly northern/central Lee County from The Deep River area, to the Carolina Trace area. The school recently went under renovations, bringing its abundance of over 50 year old buildings up to the modern standard.

== Athletics ==
Lee County is a member of the North Carolina High School Athletic Association (NCHSAA) and are classified as a 6A school. The school is a member of the Carolina Pines 6A Conference. Lee County's team name is the Yellow Jackets, with the school colors being blue and vegas gold.

Sports at Lee County include: football, tennis, golf, basketball, baseball, softball, volleyball, cross country, wrestling, cheerleading, swimming, soccer, track & field, and marching band.

The men's golf team won the NCHSAA All Classes state championship in 1983. The women's golf team won three straight NCHSAA All Classes state championships in 1997, 1998, and 1999. The volleyball team were the NCHSAA All Classes state champions in 1978.

== Notable alumni ==
- Britton Buchanan, singer-songwriter and musician
- Robert T. Reives II, American politician, member of the North Carolina House of Representatives
- Ryan Solle, professional soccer player
- Shareese Woods, track and field athlete

== See also ==
- Southern Lee High School
