= Confederate Women's Home =

Group home in Fayetteville, North Carolina

Coordinates: 35.0643°N 78.9135°W

The Confederate Women's Home was a group home in Fayetteville, North Carolina for the widows and daughters of Confederate States Army and Confederate States Navy veterans from North Carolina. It was opened in 1915 by the United Daughters of the Confederacy and received $5,000 a year from the North Carolina General Assembly to cover maintenance costs. The home was demolished in 1982.

== History ==
The Confederate Women's Home opened in Fayetteville, North Carolina in 1915. The two-story brick facility was originally proposed by Mrs. Hunter G. Smith in 1908, at the state convention of the North Carolina Division of the United Daughters of the Confederacy. Smith served as the first superintendent of the home. It was built as a group home for the benefit of widows and daughters of North Carolina's Confederate veterans of the American Civil War. The North Carolina General Assembly appropriated $10,000 for building purposes and $5,000 annually for maintenance of the residence.

By 1981, only seven women lived in the home. It was closed by the North Carolina Department of Human Resources and sold to the Fayetteville City Board of Education. In 1982, the home was demolished and the land was used as a parking lot for Terry Sanford High School. In 1986, a historical marker was placed on the site.

Sixty-five women are buried in the Confederate Women's Home Cemetery.
