= Terry Sanford High School =

American public school in North Carolina

Location
- 2301 Fort Bragg Rd; Fayetteville, North Carolina 28303; United States; 35°03′53″N 78°54′56″W

Information
- Other name: FTS
- School type: Public
- Established: 1968 (58 years ago)
- School district: Cumberland County Schools
- CEEB code: 341308
- Principal: Dr. Douglas Massengill
- Teaching staff: 63.27 (on an FTE basis)
- Enrollment: 1,213 (2023–2024)
- Student to teacher ratio: 19.17
- Colors: Blue, Red, White
- Athletics: NCHSAA 6A
- Athletics conference: Tri-County 6A/7A
- Nickname: Bulldogs
- Rival: Cape Fear High School
- Feeder schools: Max Abbott Middle, Luther Nick Jeralds Middle
- Website: tshs.ccs.k12.nc.us

Terry Sanford High School (formerly known as Fayetteville Senior High School) is a public high school in Fayetteville, North Carolina. It is named after Terry Sanford, who was a North Carolina state senator, governor of North Carolina, and United States senator. Students range from grades 9–12 and is a part of the Cumberland County School System.

== History ==
The origins of Terry Sanford High School stems from when Clyde R. Hoey, then Governor of North Carolina, dedicated Fayetteville Senior High School on September 23, 1940. In October 1954, the high school moved locations, and the student body moved to a different facility near the grounds of the former Confederate Women's Home. Fayetteville High School was renamed "Terry Sanford High School" in 1968.

== Athletics ==
Terry Sanford's sports teams play under the name "Bulldogs" as that is their mascot. The school has 17 varsity teams which compete in the Cape Fear Valley Conference.

== Notable alumni ==
- Dwayne Allen — NFL tight end
- Chip Beck — professional golfer who played on the PGA Tour
- Greg Campbell — journalist and nonfiction author
- Jay Chaudhuri — NC state senator and Minority Whip
- Chlothegod — singer-songwriter
- J. Cole — Grammy Award-winning rapper and producer
- Mark Gilbert — UFL cornerback for the Orlando Storm
- Karly Gustafson — former member of the Puerto Rico women's national soccer team
- Jimmy Herring — lead guitarist of Widespread Panic
- DJ Herz — MLB pitcher, Washington Nationals
- Gene Hobbs — founding board member of non-profit Rubicon Foundation
- Chris Hondros — was a Pulitzer Prize-nominated war photographer
- Brad Miller — politician
- Tim Morrison — NFL cornerback
- Shea Ralph — current University of Connecticut women's basketball assistant coach
- Antwoine Sanders — NFL safety
- Brent Sexton — NFL defensive back
- Holden Thorp — former Chancellor of University of North Carolina at Chapel Hill, former provost at Washington University in St. Louis
- Malik Turner — rapper and producer
- Oli Udoh — NFL offensive tackle
- Josh Villalobos — former soccer player on the Puerto Rico national team
- Austin Warren — MLB pitcher
- Demetria Washington — track and field athlete
