= Akeem Richmond =

American basketball player (born 1991)

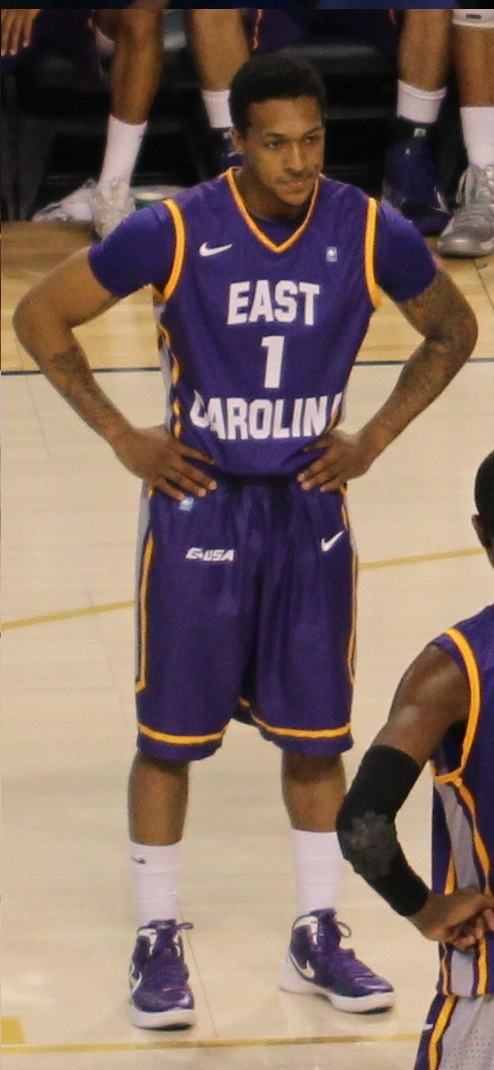
- Akeem Richmond for ECU

Personal information
- Born: April 10, 1991 (age 35) Sanford, North Carolina, U.S.
- Listed height: 6 ft 1 in (1.85 m)
- Listed weight: 180 lb (82 kg)

Career information
- High school: Southern Lee (Sanford, North Carolina)
- College: Rhode Island (2009–2011); East Carolina (2012–2014)
- NBA draft: 2014: undrafted
- Playing career: 2014–2017
- Position: Point guard

Career history
- 2014–2015: Rio Grande Valley Vipers
- 2016: Reno Bighorns
- 2016: NS Matrix
- 2017: NW Tasmania Thunder

Career highlights
- Second-team All-Conference USA (2014); Atlantic 10 All-Rookie Team (2010)
- Stats at Basketball Reference

Akeem Richmond (born April 10, 1991) is an American former professional basketball player. He played college basketball for the University of Rhode Island and East Carolina University, where he was a premier three-point shooter, recording the most three-pointers in the 2013–14 season among all college players.

== High school career ==
Richmond attended Southern Lee High School in Sanford, North Carolina where he recorded 2,846 points in his career, the second-highest career total in NCHSAA history. He also led the state of North Carolina in scoring as a sophomore, junior and senior. As a senior in 2008–09, he averaged 29.2 points per game for head coach Gaston Collins as Southern Lee finished the season with a 20–7 record.

College recruiting
Name	Hometown	School	Height	Weight	Commit date
Akeem Richmond; PG	Sanford	Southern Lee High School	6 ft 0 in (1.83 m)	180 lb (82 kg)	Apr 29, 2009
Akeem Richmond; PG	Recruit ratings: Scout: Rivals:				

== College career ==
In his freshman season at Rhode Island, Richmond was named to the Atlantic 10 All-Rookie team after averaging 8.7 points and 1.7 rebounds in 36 games. His 81 three-pointers set a school freshman record and he finished 2009–10 ranked fourth nationally among all freshmen. He was also just the third freshman in A-10 history to connect on at least 80 treys in a single season.

In his sophomore season, he appeared in all 34 games, earning the start in 26 contests. He averaged 9.3 points and 2.4 rebounds while connecting on 75 three-pointers on the season.

In May 2011, he transferred to East Carolina and subsequently sat out the 2011–12 season due to NCAA transfer regulations.

In his redshirted junior season, he played all 35 games while averaging 10.9 points, 1.8 rebounds and 1.2 assists in 20.1 minutes per game.

In his senior season, he started all 34 games while averaging a team-high 18.0 points per game, ranking second in Conference USA. He became the first player in school history to lead the NCAA in a statistical category, topping the charts in three-point field goals made (155), attempted (392) and three-pointers per game (4.56); all ECU single-season records. He subsequently finished his career ranked seventh on the all-time NCAA Three-Point Field Goals Made list with 416. He also earned second-team All-Conference USA honors in 2013–14.

== Professional career ==
After going undrafted in the 2014 NBA draft, Richmond signed with the Houston Rockets on October 25, 2014. He was waived by the Rockets on October 27 and then acquired by the Rio Grande Valley Vipers of the NBA Development League on November 2. He appeared in 29 games for the Vipers in 2014–15, averaging 10.8 points, 1.7 rebounds and 1.0 assists per game.

On November 2, 2015, Richmond was reacquired by the Rio Grande Valley Vipers, only to be waived by the Vipers on November 11. On January 31, 2016, he was acquired by the Reno Bighorns. In 15 games for Reno, he averaged 6.7 points and 1.1 rebounds per game.

In October 2016, Richmond joined Malaysian club NS Matrix for the Seri Mutiara Champions Cup.

On November 28, 2016, Richmond signed with the NW Tasmania Thunder for the 2017 SEABL season. He parted ways with the Thunder on April 4, 2017, with a family illness forcing him back to the US. He appeared in three games, averaging 13 points and 4.3 rebounds per game.

== Personal ==
Richmond is the son of Eric and Vickie Richmond, and has five siblings: a brother, Eric, and four sisters, Tenille, Emma, Michelle and Dorece. His father played football at East Carolina.

== See also ==
- List of NCAA Division I men's basketball season 3-point field goal leaders
- List of NCAA Division I men's basketball career 3-point scoring leaders
