= Brent Sexton (American football) =

American football player (born 1953)

No. 29
- Position: Defensive back

Personal information
- Born: July 23, 1953 (age 73); Fayetteville, North Carolina, U.S.
- Listed height: 6 ft 1 in (1.85 m)
- Listed weight: 190 lb (86 kg)

Career information
- High school: Terry Sanford (NC)
- College: Elon
- NFL draft: 1975: 5th round, 130th overall pick

Career history
- Pittsburgh Steelers (1975–1977)

Awards and highlights
- Super Bowl champion (X)

Career NFL statistics
- Games played: 11
- Stats at Pro Football Reference

Brent Sexton (born July 23, 1953) is an American former professional football player who played for three seasons for the Pittsburgh Steelers. He earned a Super Bowl ring in Super Bowl X over the Dallas Cowboys. He played College Football at Elon College, and was selected 130th overall by the Pittsburgh Steelers in the fifth round of the 1975 NFL draft.
