= Scotland High School =

American public school in North Carolina

Location
- 1000 West Church Street; Laurinburg, North Carolina 28352; United States; 34°46′43″N 79°28′38″W

Information
- School type: Public
- Established: 1967 (59 years ago)
- CEEB code: 342182
- Principal: Laura Bailey
- Teaching staff: 83.62 (FTE)
- Enrollment: 1,294 (2024–2025)
- Student to teacher ratio: 15.47
- Colors: Red, royal blue, and white
- Athletics: NCHSAA 6A
- Athletics conference: Tri-County 6A/7A
- Sports: Football, Baseball, Volleyball, Softball, Tennis, Cross Country, Track and Field, Basketball, Soccer, Cheerleading, Golf, and Wrestling
- Mascot: The Fighting Scot
- Website: https://shs.scotland.k12.nc.us/

Scotland High School is located in Laurinburg, North Carolina. It is a part of the Scotland County Schools district.

== Athletics ==
Scotland is a member of the North Carolina High School Athletic Association (NCHSAA) and are classified as a 6A school. The school is a part of the Tri-County 6A/7A Conference.

The school colors are red, royal blue and white, and its team name are the "Fighting Scots." Scotland has won NCHSAA state championships in 4A baseball in 1977 and 2006. The boys outdoor track & field team were 4A state champions in 1989 and 1990. The football team were 4A state champions in 2011 and have had over 10 alumni play in the NFL.

Scotland High School is also known for its kilted marching band.

== Notable alumni ==
- Russ Adams, former MLB player for the Toronto Blue Jays
- Megan Brigman, former professional soccer player
- Rush Brown, former NFL defensive lineman
- Brent Butler, former MLB utility infielder
- Bucky Covington, country music singer and former American Idol contestant
- Domenique Davis, NFL defensive tackle
- Lorinza Harrington, former professional basketball player in the NBA
- Terrell Manning, former NFL linebacker
- Tony McRae, NFL cornerback
- Greg Quick, NFL defensive tackle
- Jim Riggs, former NFL tight end
- Travian Robertson, former NFL defensive end
- Tony Settles, former NFL linebacker; was featured in "The Year of the Scab" documentary by ESPN
- Hilee Taylor, former NFL defensive end, played 3 seasons for the Carolina Panthers
- Jacoby Watkins, college football coach and former NFL player
- Zamir White, NFL running back, CFP National Champion at Georgia
