= Leo Lambert =

American academic administrator (born 1955)

8th President of Elon University
- In office 1999–2018
- Preceded by: James Fred Young
- Succeeded by: Connie Ledoux Book

Personal details
- Born: Leo Michael Lambert; June 30, 1955 (age 71) Schenectady, New York, U.S.
- Spouse: Laurie Fordham (m. 1977)
- Children: 2
- Education: State University of New York at Geneseo; Syracuse University

Leo Michael Lambert (born June 30, 1955) is a former President of Elon University. Lambert served as Elon's eighth president from 1999 to 2018 and assumed the title of President Emeritus on March 1, 2018. He was succeeded by Connie Ledoux Book.

== Education ==
Lambert graduated from the State University of New York at Geneseo in 1976. He earned a doctorate in education from Syracuse University in 1984.

== Career ==
After completing his doctoral degree at Syracuse University, Lambert remained on campus and took on the role of associate dean of the Graduate School. He helped to establish the Teaching Assistants and Future Professoriate programs. In 1996, Lambert left Elon to become provost and vice chancellor for academic affairs at the University of Wisconsin–La Crosse, a position he held for three years.

=== Elon University ===
During his 18 years of tenure from 1999 to 2018, Lambert established Elon University, a private university located in Elon, North Carolina as a liberal arts university. During his tenure, the university experienced significant growth including nearly two-thirds increase in enrollment to around 6,700 students and a doubling of the faculty. The academic climate of the campus was strengthened through investments in faculty development, library resources, honors and fellows programs for outstanding students, study abroad programs, undergraduate research, volunteer service and leadership education.

In 2001, Elon College became Elon University and the NewCentury@Elon strategic plan was developed under Lambert's leadership. During his tenure, Elon College, The College of Arts and Sciences was established from three formerly separate divisions and the School of Communications and the School of Education moved from departmental to school status. In 2006, Lambert led the drive to open the Elon University School of Law in downtown Greensboro, North Carolina.

Over 100 new buildings have been added to the campus including a library, football stadium, business school building, academic buildings, and residence halls. New facilities constructed during Lambert's tenure included Carol Grotnes Belk Library, Rhodes Stadium, Belk Track and White Field, the six-building Academic Village, Ernest A. Koury Sr. Business Center, Ellington Health Center, The Oaks residence hall complex, Colonnades Dining Hall, the Colonnades residence halls and several new residence halls and a commons building in Danieley Center. The university expanded to include the 75-acre (300,000 m^{2}) South Campus.

=== Other leadership positions ===
Lambert served on the national and North Carolina boards of Campus Compact and as a founding board member and president's council chair of Project Pericles, a national organization that encourages students to become civically engaged in their communities. Elon University has twice been named one of the nation's top universities for community service in the President's Higher Education Community Service Honor Roll.

Lambert served as a member of the NCAA Presidential Task Force on the Future of Division I Athletics and chairing the NCAA Committee on Athletics Certification.

In 2008, Lambert was appointed to the Commission on Effective Leadership by the American Council on Education. In 2009, he was named a director of the Association of American Colleges and Universities (AAC&U).

== Works ==
Lambert has written about post-secondary education and is co-editor of a book about university teaching, published by Syracuse University Press in 2005.

== Recognitions ==
In 2002, his alma mater, SUNY Geneseo, awarded him an honorary doctorate of humane letters.

== Personal life ==
Lambert married Laurie Fordham on June 11, 1977. They have two daughters.

== See also ==
- List of president of Elon University
