= Jacoby Watkins =

American football player and coach (born 1984)

No. 16
- Position: Cornerback

Personal information
- Born: March 29, 1984 (age 42); Laurinburg, North Carolina, U.S.
- Listed height: 6 ft 1 in (1.85 m)
- Listed weight: 177 lb (80 kg)

Career information
- High school: Scotland (NC)
- College: North Carolina
- NFL draft: 2007: undrafted

Career history
- Miami Dolphins (2007)*
- * Offseason or practice squad member only

Jacoby Watkins (born March 29, 1984) is a defensive coordinator/assistant head coach at ASA-Miami College in Miami, Florida. He played college football and participated in track & field at the University of North Carolina. He was signed to play Defensive Back by the Miami Dolphins as an undrafted free agent in 2007.
