= George Tucker =

George Tucker may refer to:

- St. George Tucker (1752–1827), professor of law at College of William & Mary
- George Tucker (author) (1775–1861), U.S. representative and author
- George Tucker (Canadian politician), Ontario MPP
- George Tucker (priest) (1835–1908), archdeacon of Bermuda
- George Loane Tucker (1872–1921), American film director and screenwriter
- George Tucker (musician) (1927–1965), jazz bassist
- George Tucker (American football) (1929–2013), American football coach
- George Tucker (luger) (born 1947), Puerto Rican physicist and former Olympic luger
- George Tucker, a character portrayed by Scott Porter on Hart of Dixie
