= James Fred Young =

Seventh president of Elon University

7th President of Elon University
- In office 1973–1998
- Preceded by: James Earl Danieley
- Succeeded by: Leo Lambert

Personal details
- Education: Mars Hill University; Wake Forest University; University of North Carolina at Chapel Hill (MEA); Columbia University

James Fred Young, known as Fred Young, was the seventh president of Elon University, a private liberal arts university located in Elon, North Carolina. Young served as president of Elon from 1973 to 1998. He was succeeded by Leo Lambert.

Young grew up in Burnsville, North Carolina. He attended Mars Hill College and Wake Forest University, received his master's degree in education administration from UNC-Chapel Hill, and received his doctorate from Columbia University. After serving as a principal, assistant superintendent, and superintendent, he was named president of Elon.

Young has been credited with transforming Elon from a regional institution serving average students into a selective institution with a national reputation.

== See also ==
- List of president of Elon University
