= Greg Quick (offensive tackle) =

American football player (born 1964)

No. 62
- Position: Offensive tackle

Personal information
- Born: April 26, 1963 (age 63); United States
- Listed height: 6 ft 4 in (1.93 m)
- Listed weight: 280 lb (127 kg)

Career information
- High school: Scotland (Laurinburg, North Carolina)
- College: Catawba
- NFL draft: 1987: undrafted

Career history
- Atlanta Falcons (1987)

Career NFL statistics
- Games played: 1
- Stats at Pro Football Reference

Gregory Quick (born April 26, 1964) is an American former professional football player who was an offensive tackle for one season with the Atlanta Falcons in the National Football League (NFL). He played college football for the Catawba Indians.

Quick was born on April 26, 1964. He attended and played football at Scotland High School in Laurinburg, North Carolina, and was named all-east in 1980. He was recruited to the Division I-A LSU Tigers after graduating, but ended up playing college football for Catawba College.

After going unselected in the 1987 NFL draft, Quick was signed by the Atlanta Falcons as an undrafted free agent. He was waived in August, but re-signed during the Players' Association strike, in which each team hired replacement players. He appeared in one game with the team as backup offensive tackle, a 17–25 loss against the San Francisco 49ers. At the end of the strike, most replacement players were released. Quick later said, "I'd jump on a plane and fly to Atlanta and spent a night in Atlanta for $1,000 any time."
