= Southern Lee High School =

American public school in North Carolina

Location
- 2301 Tramway Road; Sanford, North Carolina 27332; United States
- Coordinates: 35°26′07″N 79°11′06″W

Information
- Type: Public
- Established: 2005 (21 years ago)
- School district: Lee County Schools
- CEEB code: 343524
- Principal: Amy Lundy
- Faculty: 175
- Teaching staff: 75.05 (FTE)
- Grades: 9–12
- Enrollment: 1,234 (2022–23)
- Student to teacher ratio: 16.44
- Campus type: Urban
- Colors: Navy and orange
- Mascot: Cavalier
- Rival: Lee County High School
- Website: www.lee.k12.nc.us/o/slhs

Southern Lee High School is one of two high schools in Sanford, North Carolina, and serves grades 9–12. The school mascot is the Cavalier and the school's colors are navy and orange.

== Athletics ==
Southern Lee is a member of the North Carolina High School Athletic Association (NCHSAA) and are classified as a 6A school. The school is a member of the Carolina Pines 6A Conference. Southern Lee's team name is the Cavilers, with the school colors being navy and orange.

Sports at Southern Lee include: baseball, basketball, cross country, football, golf, soccer, softball, swimming, tennis, track & field, volleyball, and wrestling.

== Notable alumni ==
- Heather Connor (class of 2009), powerlifting world champion
- Thomas Harrington (class of 2020), MLB pitcher
- Aaron Mellette (class of 2008), NFL wide receiver
- Patrick "ACHES" Price (class of 2012), professional Call of Duty player
- Akeem Richmond (class of 2009), professional basketball player

== See also ==
- Lee County High School (Sanford, North Carolina)
