= Power Kills =

1997 nonfiction political book sequel by Rudolph Rummel

Power Kills: Democracy as a Method of Nonviolence
- Author: Rudolph Rummel
- Language: English
- Publisher: Transaction Books
- Publication date: 1997
- Publication place: United States
- Pages: 246

In Power Kills: Democracy as a Method of Nonviolence by American political scientist Rudolph Rummel (1997), a sequel to his 1994 book Death by Government argues that the more power a government has, the more it tends to kill its own citizens and make war on other countries, and conversely, the less power a government has over its citizens, the less it tends to kill them or to launch wars of aggression, proposing that democracy is the form of government least likely to commit democide.

== See also ==
- Democide
- Rudolph Rummel
- Rummel's Law
