= Karly Gustafson =

American–Puerto Rican retired footballer

Personal information
- Full name: Karly Marie Gustafson Auffant
- Date of birth: 7 April 1995 (age 31)
- Height: 1.75 m (5 ft 9 in)
- Position: Goalkeeper

Youth career
- Terry Sanford High School

College career
Years	Team	Apps	(Gls)
2013–2014	NC State Wolfpack	11	(0)
2015–2016	Winthrop Eagles	22	(0)

International career^{‡}
2016	Puerto Rico	1+	(0)
- ‡ National team caps and goals as of 10 February 2016

Karly Marie Gustafson Auffant (born 7 April 1995) is an American-born Puerto Rican retired footballer who has played as a goalkeeper. She has been a member of the Puerto Rico women's national team.

== Early life ==
Gustafson was raised in Fayetteville, North Carolina. She attended Terry Sanford High School in Fayetteville and played soccer all four years.

== International career ==
Gustafson capped for Puerto Rico at senior level during the 2016 CONCACAF Women's Olympic Qualifying Championship.
