= Josh Villalobos =

Puerto Rican footballer

Personal information
- Full name: Joshua Villalobos
- Date of birth: November 13, 1985 (age 40)
- Place of birth: Fayetteville, North Carolina, United States
- Height: 5 ft 7 in (1.70 m)
- Position: Midfielder

Team information
- Current team: Southern Soccer Academy Swarm FC

Youth career
- 2000–2001: IMG Soccer Academy
- 2002–2005: Furman Paladins

Senior career*
Years	Team	Apps	(Gls)
2004	Carolina Dynamo	7	(1)

International career
- United States U17
- United States U18
2008	Puerto Rico	2	(0)
- * Club domestic league appearances and goals as of 9 July 2008

Joshua Villalobos is a soccer player who plays midfielder for the Puerto Rican national team. He played college soccer at Furman University where he was a standout.
