= George Tucker (American football) =

American football coach

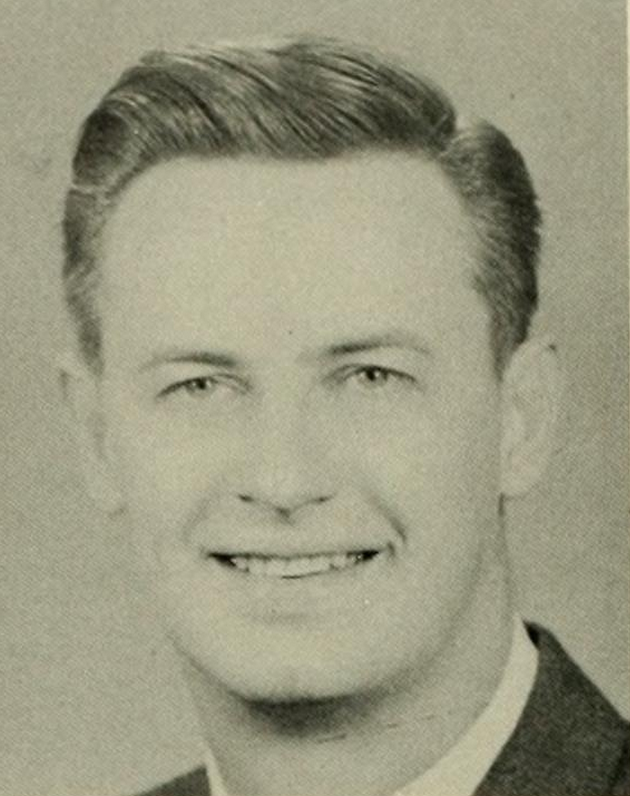
- Tucker pictured in Phi Psi Cli 1960, Elon yearbook

Biographical details
- Born: September 5, 1929; Monroe, North Carolina, U.S.
- Died: March 1, 2013 (aged 83); Columbia, South Carolina, U.S.

Coaching career (HC unless noted)
- ?: Lancaster HS (SC)
- 1957–1958: Wingate
- 1959: East Carolina (assistant)
- 1960–1964: Elon

Head coaching record
- Overall: 29–20–1 (college)

Accomplishments and honors

Championships
- 2 Carolinas Conference (1963–1964)

George M. Tucker (September 5, 1929 – March 1, 2013) was an American football coach. He served as the head football at Elon University from 1960 until 1964, compiling a record of 29–20–1. Later working as a stockbroker after his retirement from coaching, Tucker was a member of the Elon Sports Hall of Fame.

Tucker was the head football coach at Wingate University in the 1950s when the school was still a junior college.

== Head coaching record ==
=== College ===
Year	Team	Overall	Conference	Standing	Bowl/playoffs	NAIA^{#}
Elon Fightin' Christians (North State Conference / Carolinas Conference) (1960–1964)
1960	Elon	4–6	2–4	T–4th		
1961	Elon	4–6	3–4	T–5th		
1962	Elon	7–3	4–2	2nd		
1963	Elon	6–4	5–1	T–1st		
1964	Elon	8–1–1	4–1–1	1st		20
Elon:		29–20–1	18–12–1			
Total:		29–20–1				
National championship Conference title Conference division title or championship game berth
^{#}Rankings from NAIA poll.
