= Tony Settles =

American football player (born 1964)

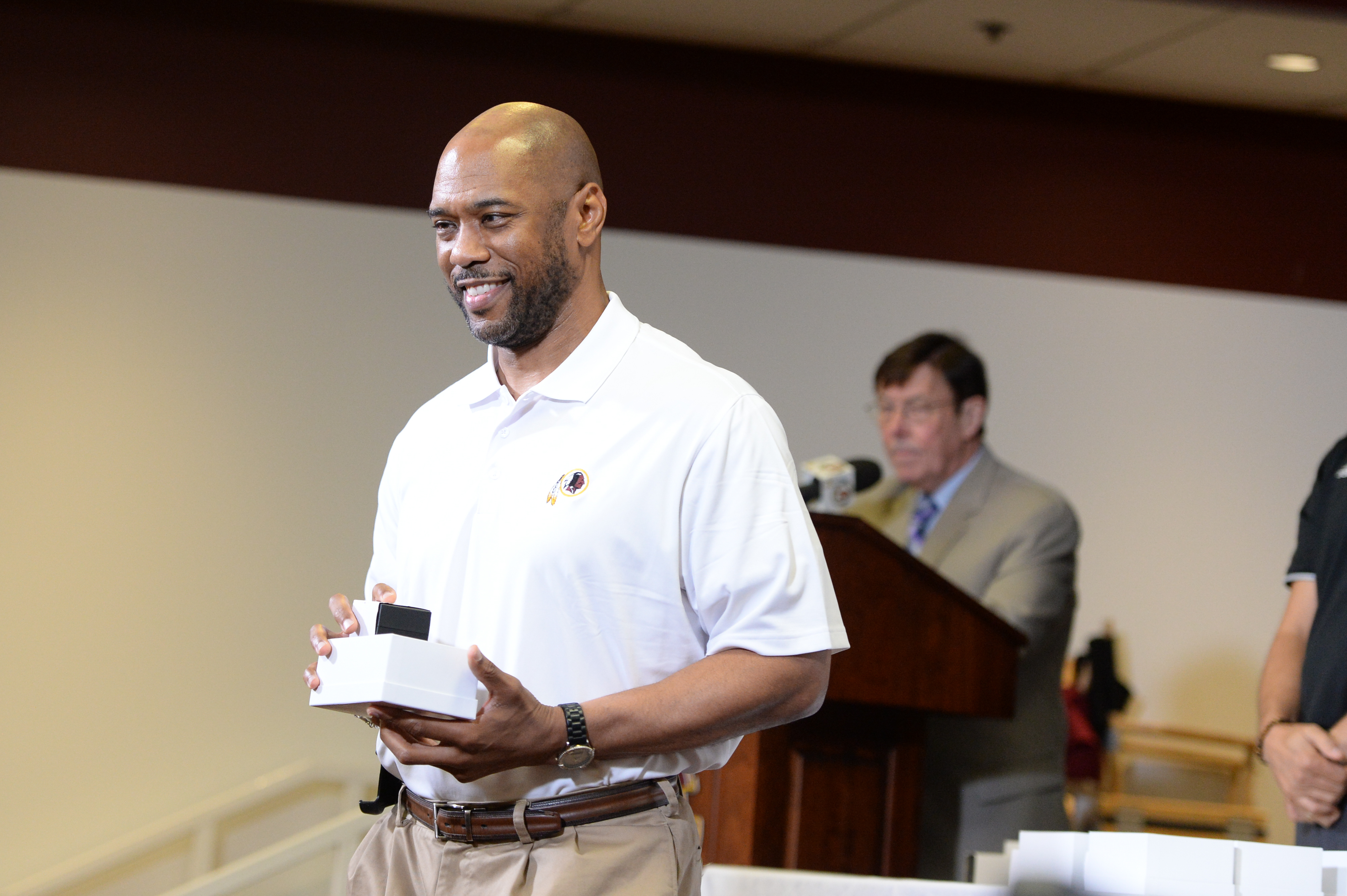
- Settles receiving his Super Bowl ring at a ceremony held in 2018

No. 91
- Position: Linebacker

Personal information
- Born: August 29, 1964 (age 62); Laurinburg, North Carolina, U.S.
- Listed height: 6 ft 3 in (1.91 m)
- Listed weight: 210 lb (95 kg)

Career information
- High school: Scotland (Laurinburg)
- College: Elon
- NFL draft: 1987: undrafted

Career history
- Washington Redskins (1987)

Career NFL statistics
- Games played: 3
- Stats at Pro Football Reference

Anthony C. Settles (born August 29, 1964) is an American former professional football player who was a linebacker in the National Football League (NFL) for the Washington Redskins in 1987. He played college football for the Elon Phoenix.

He was a replacement player for the Redskins during the 1987 NFL players' strike. He played in three games and was featured in The Year of Scab documentary by ESPN. Settles, along with the other replacements, was mentioned in an ESPN documentary titled Year of the Scab, and was the inspiration for the 2000 film The Replacements. In 2018, Settles was awarded a Super Bowl ring for playing for the Redskins in 1987, the year they won Super Bowl XXII.
