= Patsy Lynch =

American photographer (born 1953)

Patsy Lynch (born July 21, 1953) is an American photographer. Her work documents GLBT civil rights advocacy.

== Life ==
Lynch grew up in Washington, D.C. She graduated from Elon University, where she was co-editor of the college newspaper, and from Gallaudet University.

She has covered such events as the 1979 National March on Washington for Lesbian and Gay Rights, and the 1988 Deaf President Now protests at Gallaudet.

Her LGBT advocacy includes being a founding member of the Washington, D.C., chapter of the National Lesbian and Gay Journalists Association, as well as covering the White House, the first openly gay journalist to do so.

Her photography appeared in a 2007 exhibit by the Rainbow History Project called "Community Pioneers", of which she said:

I want to document what's going on so that years from now someone can say 'This happened.' Too much of gay and lesbian history has already been lost.

Her work is in the collection of the Smithsonian Museum of American History.

== Awards and recognition ==
- 2006: GLAAD Awardee of Distinguished Service Award.
