= Ann J. Cahill =

American philosopher and academic

Ann J. Cahill is an American philosopher and professor of philosophy at Elon University. Her research focuses on feminist philosophy, phenomenology and philosophy of the body. Her work has developed the concept of unjust sex referring not only to sexual assault but also to situations where women are uncomfortably pressured to have sex, or to have sex without contraception. Cahill has also argued that sexual assault survivors should be allowed the right to "the freedom of silence," as talking about one's experiences of assault can aggravate their pain.

Cahill holds a PhD in Philosophy from the State University of New York at Stony Brook which was awarded in 1998. In 2001 she had published her book Rethinking rape published. In 2011 she was named Distinguished University Scholar of Elon University. In 2025 she had the second edition of her book Overcoming objectification A carnal ethics published.
