= Terrell Manning =

American football player (born 1990)

No. 56, 53, 97
- Position: Linebacker

Personal information
- Born: April 16, 1990 (age 36); Laurinburg, North Carolina, U.S.
- Listed height: 6 ft 2 in (1.88 m)
- Listed weight: 237 lb (108 kg)

Career information
- High school: Scotland(Laurinburg)
- College: North Carolina State
- NFL draft: 2012: 5th round, 163rd overall pick

Career history
- Green Bay Packers (2012); San Diego Chargers (2013); Minnesota Vikings (2014)*; New York Giants (2014)*; Miami Dolphins (2014)*; Chicago Bears (2014); Cincinnati Bengals (2014)*; New York Giants (2014); Atlanta Falcons (2015)*; Miami Dolphins (2015–2016)*; Edmonton Eskimos (2017)*
- * Offseason or practice squad member only

Awards and highlights
- Second-team All-ACC (2011)

Career NFL statistics
- Total tackles: 3
- Stats at Pro Football Reference

Terrell Manning (born April 16, 1990) is an American former professional football player who was a linebacker in the National Football League (NFL). Manning was selected by the Green Bay Packers in the fifth round, 163rd overall, in the 2012 NFL draft. He played college football for the NC State Wolfpack.

He was also a member of the San Diego Chargers, Minnesota Vikings, New York Giants, Miami Dolphins, Chicago Bears, Cincinnati Bengals, Atlanta Falcons and Edmonton Eskimos.

== Professional career ==
Pre-draft measurables
Height	Weight	Arm length	Hand span	40-yard dash	10-yard split	20-yard split	20-yard shuttle	Three-cone drill	Vertical jump	Broad jump	Bench press	Wonderlic
6 ft 2 in (1.88 m)	237 lb (108 kg)	32 1/4 in (0.82 m)	9 1/4 in (0.23 m)	4.71 s	1.70 s	2.69 s	4.43 s	7.18 s	32 1/2 in (0.83 m)	9 ft 6 in (2.90 m)	22 reps	23
All values from NFL Combine and Pro Day

=== Green Bay Packers ===
Manning was signed by the Green Bay Packers on May 11, 2012. He was released on August 31, 2013.

=== San Diego Chargers ===
Manning was claimed off waivers by the San Diego Chargers on September 1, 2013. He was released on September 25, 2013. Manning was signed to the Chargers' practice squad on September 28, 2013.

=== Minnesota Vikings ===
He signed with the Minnesota Vikings on April 15, 2014, but was released on May 13, 2014.

=== New York Giants (first stint) ===
Manning signed with the New York Giants on June 16, 2014, but was released on August 30, 2014.

=== Miami Dolphins (first stint) ===
Manning signed to the practice squad of the Miami Dolphins on September 4, 2014, he was released on September 17, 2014.

=== Chicago Bears ===
Manning was signed to the Chicago Bears practice squad on September 19, 2014. He was elevated to the 53 man roster on September 22, 2014, he was released on October 1, 2014. He was signed to the practice squad on October 7, 2014. He was elevated to the 53 man roster on October 11, 2014, he was released on October 13, 2014. He was signed to the practice squad on October 14, 2014, he was released on November 11, 2014

=== Cincinnati Bengals ===
Manning was signed to the Cincinnati Bengals practice squad on November 18, 2014.

=== New York Giants (second stint) ===
Manning was activated from the Bengals practice squad to the 53 man roster of the Giants on November 25, 2014. On December 3, 2014, he was put on IR and on February 2, 2015, the season ended so he was taken off IR.

=== Atlanta Falcons ===
Manning was signed on August 16, 2015. On August 30, 2015, the Falcons announced that Manning was waived, but he remained on the roster due to his name not being submitted to the league office. On September 4, 2015, he was waived by the Falcons.

=== Miami Dolphins (second stint) ===
Manning was signed to the Dolphins' practice squad on September 23, 2015. He was released by the Dolphins on September 29. He re-signed to the team's practice squad on November 2, 2015.

On April 28, 2016, Manning was released.

=== Edmonton Eskimos ===
Manning signed with the Edmonton Eskimos on May 11, 2017.
