= 1981 Elon Fightin' Christians football team =

American college football season

1981 Elon Fightin' Christians football

NAIA Division I national champion SAC champion

NAIA Division I Championship Game, W 3–0 vs. Pittsburg State
- Conference: South Atlantic Conference
- Record: 11–1–1 (6–1 SAC)
- Head coach: Jerry Tolley (5th season)

1981 South Atlantic Conference football standings
	Conf.					Overall
Team	W		L		T	W		L		T
No. 2 Elon $^	6	–	1	–	0	12	–	1	–	1
Presbyterian	5	–	2	–	0	6	–	5	–	0
Carson–Newman	4	–	3	–	0	7	–	4	–	0
Catawba	3	–	4	–	0	5	–	5	–	0
Gardner–Webb	3	–	4	–	0	5	–	5	–	0
Mars Hill	3	–	4	–	0	5	–	5	–	0
Newberry	2	–	5	–	0	4	–	7	–	0
Lenoir–Rhyne	2	–	5	–	0	2	–	9	–	0
$ – Conference champion; ^ – NAIA Division I playoff participant; Rankings from NAIA Division I poll

The 1981 Elon Fightin' Christians football team was an American football team that represented Elon University of Elon, North Carolina, as a member of the South Atlantic Conference (SAC) during the 1981 NAIA Division I football season. In their fifth and final year under head coach Jerry Tolley, the Christians compiled an 11–1–1 record (6–1 against SAC opponents) and won the SAC championship.

The team lost to Catawba and tied with Norfolk State. The team advanced to the NAIA Division I playoffs, defeating Concord (38–8) in the quarterfinals, Hillsdale (41–13) in the semifinals, and Pittsburg State (3–0) in the national championship game.

== Schedule ==
Date	Opponent	Site	Result	Attendance	Source
September 12	Mars Hill	Burlington Memorial Football Stadium; Burlington, NC	W 8–0		
September 19	at Guilford*	Greensboro, NC	W 38–0		
October 3	Lenoir–Rhyne	Burlington Memorial Football Stadium; Burlington, NC	W 12–3		
October 10	at Norfolk State*	Norfolk, VA	T 20–20	15,500	
October 17	at Presbyterian	Clinton, SC	W 16–10		
October 24	Catawba	Burlington Memorial Football Stadium; Burlington, NC	L 30–17		
October 31	Gardner–Webb	Burlington Memorial Football Stadium; Burlington, NC	W 56–10		
November 7	at Newberry	Newberry, SC	W 27–21	3,000	
November 14	Winston-Salem State*	Burlington Memorial Football Stadium; Burlington, NC	W 30–20	6,500	
November 21	at Carson–Newman	Jefferson City, TN	W 23–14		
December 5	at Concord*	Bluefield, WV (NAIA Division I quarterfinal)	W 37–8	1,500	
December 12	Hillsdale*	Burlington Memorial Football Stadium; Burlington, NC (NAIA Division I semifinal)	W 41–13	4,500	
December 19	Pittsburg State*	Burlington Memorial Football Stadium; Burlington, NC (NAIA Division I National Championship Game)	W 3–0	3,705	
*Non-conference game
