= Jesse Branson =

American basketball player

Personal information
- Born: January 7, 1942 Graham, North Carolina, U.S.
- Died: November 2, 2014 (aged 72) Gibsonville, North Carolina, U.S.
- Listed height: 6 ft 7 in (2.01 m)
- Listed weight: 195 lb (88 kg)

Career information
- High school: Holt (Burlington, North Carolina)
- College: Elon (1961–1965)
- NBA draft: 1965: 2nd round, 13th overall pick
- Drafted by: Philadelphia 76ers
- Playing career: 1965–1968
- Position: Small forward
- Number: 22, 24

Career history
- 1965: Philadelphia 76ers
- 1965–1966: Trenton Colonials
- 1967–1968: New Orleans Buccaneers

Career NBA and ABA statistics
- Points: 1,091 (13.1 ppg)
- Rebounds: 541 (6.6 rpg)
- Assists: 67 (0.8 apg)
- Stats at NBA.com
- Stats at Basketball Reference

Herman Jesse Branson (January 7, 1942 – November 2, 2014) was an American basketball player.

Born in Graham, North Carolina, he played collegiately for Elon University. He was 6 feet 8 inches (2.03 m) tall.

His #40 jersey number was retired after his time at Elon, but was temporarily taken out of retirement for his son Brian to wear during his senior year. One of Jesse's jerseys now hangs on display in the Elon Scharr Center, moved from its former place in the alumni gym.

He was selected by the Philadelphia 76ers in the second round (18th pick overall) of the 1965 NBA draft, playing for them in five games during the 1965–66 NBA season and for the New Orleans Buccaneers in 78 games during the ABA's 1967–68 sesaon.

== Personal life ==
Jesse was married to Barbra (née Tillman) from 1962 until his own death. During his senior year in 1965, they had their first child, Brian Branson.

Branson died on November 2, 2014, in Gibsonville, North Carolina, where he lived.

== Career statistics ==
Legend
GP	Games played	GS	Games started	MPG	Minutes per game
FG%	Field goal percentage	3P%	3-point field goal percentage	FT%	Free throw percentage
RPG	Rebounds per game	APG	Assists per game	SPG	Steals per game
BPG	Blocks per game	PPG	Points per game	**Bold**	Career high
*	Led the league

=== NBA/ABA ===
==== Regular season ====
Year	Team	GP	MPG	FG%	3P%	FT%	RPG	APG	PPG
1965–66	Philadelphia	5	2.8	.167		**.750**	1.8	.2	1.0
1967–68	New Orleans (ABA)	**78**	**24.3**	**.429**	**.222**	.702	**6.9**	**.9**	**13.9**
Career		83	23.0	.427	.222	.702	6.6	.8	13.1

==== Playoffs ====
Year	Team	GP	MPG	FG%	3P%	FT%	RPG	APG	PPG
1968	New Orleans (ABA)	17*	23.6	.394	.000	.816	6.0	1.2	11.4
