= Jeffrey Pugh =

- Born: 1952 (age 73–74)
- Occupations: Religious Studies professor theologian
- Theological work
- Language: English
- Tradition or movement: Methodist

Jeffrey C. Pugh was Distinguished University Professor and the Maude Sharpe Powell Professor of Religious Studies at Elon University. He earned his master of divinity degree from Wesley Theological Seminary and another master's and doctorate from Drew University Graduate School. He is an ordained United Methodist Minister. He joined Elon's faculty in 1986. In 2000, he won Elon's Daniels-Danieley Award for Excellence in Teaching. In 2010, he was named Elon's Distinguished University Scholar. He was named Distinguished University Professor in 2017. He retired from Elon at the end of the 2018 term.

His books include

- The Anselmic Shift: Christology and Method in Karl Barth’s Theology (1990)
- The Matrix of Faith: Reclaiming a Christian Vision (2001)
- Entertaining the Triune Mystery: God, Science and the Space Between (2003)
- Religionless Christianity: Dietrich Bonhoeffer in Troubled Times (2009)
- Devil's Ink: Blog from the Basement Office (2011)
- The Homebrewed Christianity Guide to the End Times: Theology After You've Been Left Behind (2016)

He has been a regular commentator on national and state issues. In one interview for CNN, he pointed to the implications of the 2012 Republican presidential ticket being made up of representatives of Christian religious traditions that had been widely castigated by previous generations of Republicans. He has engaged with North Carolina politics in op-eds that have appeared in a variety of North Carolina newspapers, arguing against North Carolina's efforts to ban same-sex marriage and in support of the Moral Monday movement. He was one of the counter-protestors at the Unite The Right rally in Charlottesville, Virginia in 2017. He was also one of the original signers of The Boston Declaration: a Prophetic Appeal to Christians of the United States, in November 2017.
