= 1981 NAIA Division I football season =

American college football season

- Regular season: August–November 1981
- Postseason: December 5–19, 1981
- National Championship: Burlington Memorial Stadium; Burlington, NC
- Champions: Elon (2)

The 1981 NAIA Division I football season was the 26th season of college football sponsored by the NAIA, was the 12th season of play of the NAIA's top division for football.

The season was played from August to November 1981 and culminated in the 1981 NAIA Division I Champion Bowl, played this year on December 19, 1981 at Burlington Memorial Stadium in Burlington, North Carolina (near the campus of Elon College).

Defending national champion Elon defeated Pittsburg State in the Champion Bowl, 3–0, to win their second NAIA national title.

== Conference changes ==
- This is the final season the NAIA officially recognizes a football champion from the Great Lakes Intercollegiate Athletic Conference and the Lone Star Conference. Both the GLIAC and the Lone Star became an NCAA Division II conferences, where both continue to sponsor football (with the exception of a ten-year hiatus for the GLIAC between 1989 and 1999).

== Conference standings ==
1981 Arkansas Intercollegiate Conference football standings
| | Conf. | | | | | Overall |
| Team | W | | L | | T | W | | L | | T |
|---|---|---|---|---|---|---|---|---|---|---|
| No. 8 Central Arkansas $^ | 6 | – | 0 | – | 0 | 8 | – | 3 | – | 0 |
| No. 11 Arkansas–Monticello | 5 | – | 1 | – | 0 | 7 | – | 2 | – | 0 |
| No. 18 Henderson State | 3 | – | 3 | – | 0 | 7 | – | 3 | – | 0 |
| No. 14 Southern Arkansas | 3 | – | 3 | – | 0 | 7 | – | 3 | – | 0 |
| Arkansas Tech | 2 | – | 4 | – | 0 | 4 | – | 5 | – | 1 |
| Ouachita Baptist | 2 | – | 4 | – | 0 | 3 | – | 6 | – | 0 |
| Harding | 0 | – | 6 | – | 0 | 2 | – | 9 | – | 0 |
$ – Conference champion; ^ – NAIA Division I playoff participant; Rankings from NAIA Division I poll

1981 Central Intercollegiate Athletic Association football standings
| | Conf. | | | | | Overall |
| Team | W | | L | | T | W | | L | | T |
|---|---|---|---|---|---|---|---|---|---|---|
Northern
| No. 2 Virginia Union xy$^ | 7 | – | 0 | – | 0 | 11 | – | 1 | – | 0 |
| Elizabeth City State ^ | 6 | – | 1 | – | 0 | 8 | – | 3 | – | 0 |
| No. 10 Hampton | 5 | – | 2 | – | 0 | 8 | – | 2 | – | 0 |
| Norfolk State | 3 | – | 4 | – | 0 | 4 | – | 5 | – | 1 |
| Virginia State | 3 | – | 4 | – | 0 | 4 | – | 6 | – | 0 |
| Saint Paul's (VA) | 0 | – | 7 | – | 0 | 0 | – | 10 | – | 0 |
Southern
| North Carolina Central xy | 6 | – | 1 | – | 0 | 7 | – | 4 | – | 0 |
| Winston-Salem State | 4 | – | 3 | – | 0 | 5 | – | 5 | – | 0 |
| Johnson C. Smith | 3 | – | 4 | – | 0 | 4 | – | 6 | – | 0 |
| Fayetteville State | 2 | – | 5 | – | 0 | 3 | – | 5 | – | 0 |
| Livingstone | 1 | – | 6 | – | 0 | 3 | – | 7 | – | 0 |
| Bowie State * | 2 | – | 5 | – | 0 | 5 | – | 5 | – | 0 |
Championship: Virginia Union 45, North Carolina Central 7
$ – Conference champion; x – Division champion/co-champions; y – Championship game participant; ^ – NCAA Division II playoff participant; * – ineligible for conference title; Rankings from NCAA Division II Football Committee poll for Virginia Union and NAIA Division I poll for Hampton

1981 Central States Intercollegiate Conference football standings
| | Conf. | | | | | Overall |
| Team | W | | L | | T | W | | L | | T |
|---|---|---|---|---|---|---|---|---|---|---|
| No. 6 Pittsburg State $^ | 7 | – | 0 | – | 0 | 10 | – | 2 | – | 0 |
| No. 12 Missouri Western | 5 | – | 2 | – | 0 | 8 | – | 2 | – | 0 |
| Missouri Southern * | 5 | – | 2 | – | 0 | 6 | – | 4 | – | 1 |
| Kearney State | 4 | – | 3 | – | 0 | 5 | – | 4 | – | 0 |
| Fort Hays State | 3 | – | 4 | – | 0 | 6 | – | 5 | – | 0 |
| Wayne State (NE) | 2 | – | 5 | – | 0 | 4 | – | 6 | – | 0 |
| Washburn | 2 | – | 5 | – | 0 | 3 | – | 7 | – | 0 |
| Emporia State | 0 | – | 7 | – | 0 | 1 | – | 9 | – | 0 |
$ – Conference champion; ^ – NAIA Division I playoff participant * – Missouri Southern forfeited a non-conference win over Evangel.; Rankings from NAIA Division I poll

1981 Evergreen Conference football standings
| | Conf. | | | | | Overall |
| Team | W | | L | | T | W | | L | | T |
|---|---|---|---|---|---|---|---|---|---|---|
| No. 15 Oregon Tech $ | 4 | – | 0 | – | 0 | 7 | – | 2 | – | 0 |
| Eastern Oregon | 3 | – | 1 | – | 0 | 5 | – | 4 | – | 0 |
| Central Washington | 2 | – | 2 | – | 0 | 6 | – | 3 | – | 0 |
| Western Oregon | 1 | – | 3 | – | 0 | 5 | – | 4 | – | 0 |
| Western Washington | 0 | – | 4 | – | 0 | 0 | – | 9 | – | 0 |
| Southern Oregon * | | | – | | | 6 | – | 4 | – | 0 |
$ – Conference champion; * – Southern Oregon was ineligible for the conference titlepoll=NAIA Division I poll; Rankings from AP Poll

1981 Great Lakes Intercollegiate Athletic Conference football standings
| | Conf. | | | | | Overall |
| Team | W | | L | | T | W | | L | | T |
|---|---|---|---|---|---|---|---|---|---|---|
| Grand Valley State $ | 6 | – | 0 | – | 0 | 7 | – | 2 | – | 0 |
| No. 3 Hillsdale ^ | 5 | – | 1 | – | 0 | 10 | – | 2 | – | 0 |
| Ferris State | 3 | – | 3 | – | 0 | 4 | – | 4 | – | 0 |
| Wayne State (MI) | 3 | – | 3 | – | 0 | 4 | – | 5 | – | 0 |
| Northwood | 2 | – | 4 | – | 0 | 4 | – | 6 | – | 0 |
| Saginaw Valley State | 2 | – | 4 | – | 0 | 3 | – | 7 | – | 0 |
| Michigan Tech | 0 | – | 6 | – | 0 | 1 | – | 8 | – | 0 |
$ – Conference champion; ^ – NAIA Division I playoff participant; Rankings from NAIA Division I poll

1981 Lone Star Conference football standings
| | Conf. | | | | | Overall |
| Team | W | | L | | T | W | | L | | T |
|---|---|---|---|---|---|---|---|---|---|---|
| No. 4 Southwest Texas State $^ | 6 | – | 1 | – | 0 | 13 | – | 1 | – | 0 |
| No. 9 Texas A&I | 5 | – | 2 | – | 0 | 9 | – | 2 | – | 0 |
| Abilene Christian | 5 | – | 2 | – | 0 | 8 | – | 2 | – | 0 |
| Angelo State | 5 | – | 2 | – | 0 | 8 | – | 3 | – | 0 |
| No. 17 East Texas State | 4 | – | 3 | – | 0 | 7 | – | 4 | – | 0 |
| Sam Houston State | 2 | – | 5 | – | 0 | 3 | – | 7 | – | 0 |
| Howard Payne | 1 | – | 6 | – | 0 | 3 | – | 7 | – | 0 |
| Stephen F. Austin | 0 | – | 7 | – | 0 | 1 | – | 10 | – | 0 |
$ – Conference champion; ^ – NCAA Division II playoff participant; Rankings from NCAA Division II Football Committee poll for Southwest Texas State and Texas A&I and NAIA Division I poll for East Texas State

1981 Northern Intercollegiate Conference football standings
| | Conf. | | | | | Overall |
| Team | W | | L | | T | W | | L | | T |
|---|---|---|---|---|---|---|---|---|---|---|
| No. 1 Moorhead State $* | 6 | – | 0 | – | 0 | 10 | – | 1 | – | 1 |
| Minnesota Duluth | 5 | – | 1 | – | 0 | 9 | – | 1 | – | 0 |
| Minnesota Morris ^ | 4 | – | 2 | – | 0 | 7 | – | 3 | – | 1 |
| Southwest State (MN) | 3 | – | 3 | – | 0 | 6 | – | 4 | – | 0 |
| Northern State | 2 | – | 4 | – | 0 | 4 | – | 6 | – | 0 |
| Winona State | 1 | – | 5 | – | 0 | 1 | – | 9 | – | 0 |
| Bemidji State | 0 | – | 6 | – | 0 | 0 | – | 10 | – | 0 |
$ – Conference champion; ^ – NCAA Division III playoff participant; * – NAIA Division I playoff participant; Rankings from NAIA Division I poll

1981 Oklahoma Intercollegiate Conference football standings
| | Conf. | | | | | Overall |
| Team | W | | L | | T | W | | L | | T |
|---|---|---|---|---|---|---|---|---|---|---|
| No. 13 Northeastern State $ | 3 | – | 1 | – | 0 | 9 | – | 1 | – | 0 |
| SW Oklahoma State | 2 | – | 2 | – | 0 | 3 | – | 8 | – | 0 |
| SE Oklahoma State | 2 | – | 2 | – | 0 | 3 | – | 6 | – | 0 |
| East Central | 2 | – | 2 | – | 0 | 2 | – | 7 | – | 0 |
| NW Oklahoma State | 1 | – | 3 | – | 0 | 3 | – | 7 | – | 0 |
$ – Conference champion; SW Oklahoma State forfeited six victories including conference wins over Northeastern State and SE Oklahoma State.poll=NAIA Division I poll; Rankings from AP Poll

1981 Rocky Mountain Athletic Conference football standings
| | Conf. | | | | | Overall |
| Team | W | | L | | T | W | | L | | T |
|---|---|---|---|---|---|---|---|---|---|---|
| No. 19 New Mexico Highlands $ | 7 | – | 1 | – | 0 | 7 | – | 3 | – | 0 |
| Mesa | 6 | – | 2 | – | 0 | 7 | – | 3 | – | 0 |
| No. 20 Southern Utah | 6 | – | 2 | – | 0 | 7 | – | 3 | – | 0 |
| Western State (CO) | 5 | – | 3 | – | 0 | 5 | – | 4 | – | 0 |
| Adams State | 3 | – | 4 | – | 1 | 3 | – | 5 | – | 1 |
| Fort Lewis | 3 | – | 5 | – | 0 | 3 | – | 7 | – | 0 |
| Southern Colorado | 2 | – | 6 | – | 0 | 4 | – | 6 | – | 0 |
| Colorado Mines | 2 | – | 5 | – | 1 | 3 | – | 5 | – | 1 |
| Western New Mexico | 1 | – | 7 | – | 0 | 1 | – | 8 | – | 0 |
$ – Conference champion; Rankings from NAIA Division I poll

1981 South Atlantic Conference football standings
| | Conf. | | | | | Overall |
| Team | W | | L | | T | W | | L | | T |
|---|---|---|---|---|---|---|---|---|---|---|
| No. 2 Elon $^ | 6 | – | 1 | – | 0 | 12 | – | 1 | – | 1 |
| Presbyterian | 5 | – | 2 | – | 0 | 6 | – | 5 | – | 0 |
| Carson–Newman | 4 | – | 3 | – | 0 | 7 | – | 4 | – | 0 |
| Catawba | 3 | – | 4 | – | 0 | 5 | – | 5 | – | 0 |
| Gardner–Webb | 3 | – | 4 | – | 0 | 5 | – | 5 | – | 0 |
| Mars Hill | 3 | – | 4 | – | 0 | 5 | – | 5 | – | 0 |
| Newberry | 2 | – | 5 | – | 0 | 4 | – | 7 | – | 0 |
| Lenoir–Rhyne | 2 | – | 5 | – | 0 | 2 | – | 9 | – | 0 |
$ – Conference champion; ^ – NAIA Division I playoff participant; Rankings from NAIA Division I poll

1981 West Virginia Intercollegiate Athletic Conference football standings
| | Conf. | | | | | Overall |
| Team | W | | L | | T | W | | L | | T |
|---|---|---|---|---|---|---|---|---|---|---|
| No. 4 Concord +^ | 7 | – | 1 | – | 0 | 9 | – | 2 | – | 0 |
| No. 5 Fairmont State +^ | 7 | – | 1 | – | 0 | 9 | – | 2 | – | 0 |
| No. 16 Shepherd | 6 | – | 2 | – | 0 | 7 | – | 2 | – | 0 |
| West Virginia Tech | 5 | – | 3 | – | 0 | 6 | – | 4 | – | 0 |
| Salem | 3 | – | 5 | – | 0 | 3 | – | 6 | – | 0 |
| West Virginia State | 2 | – | 5 | – | 1 | 3 | – | 5 | – | 1 |
| West Virginia Wesleyan | 2 | – | 5 | – | 1 | 2 | – | 6 | – | 1 |
| West Liberty State | 2 | – | 6 | – | 0 | 2 | – | 7 | – | 0 |
| Glenville State | 1 | – | 7 | – | 0 | 1 | – | 8 | – | 0 |
+ – Conference co-champions; ^ – NAIA Division I playoff participant; Rankings from NAIA Division I poll

1981 Wisconsin State University Conference football standings
| | Conf. | | | | | Overall |
| Team | W | | L | | T | W | | L | | T |
|---|---|---|---|---|---|---|---|---|---|---|
| No. 9 Wisconsin–Eau Claire $ | 8 | – | 0 | – | 0 | 9 | – | 1 | – | 0 |
| Wisconsin–Whitewater | 5 | – | 3 | – | 0 | 7 | – | 3 | – | 0 |
| Wisconsin–Stout | 5 | – | 3 | – | 0 | 7 | – | 4 | – | 0 |
| Wisconsin–La Crosse | 4 | – | 4 | – | 0 | 6 | – | 4 | – | 0 |
| Wisconsin–Platteville | 4 | – | 4 | – | 0 | 6 | – | 4 | – | 0 |
| Wisconsin–Stevens Point | 4 | – | 4 | – | 0 | 5 | – | 5 | – | 0 |
| Wisconsin–Oshkosh | 3 | – | 5 | – | 0 | 5 | – | 5 | – | 0 |
| Wisconsin–River Falls | 3 | – | 5 | – | 0 | 5 | – | 5 | – | 0 |
| Wisconsin–Superior | 0 | – | 8 | – | 0 | 0 | – | 11 | – | 0 |
$ – Conference champion; Rankings from NAIA Division I poll

1981 NAIA Division I independents football records
| | Conf. | | | Overall |
| Team | W | L | T | W | | L | | T |
|---|---|---|---|---|---|---|---|---|
| No. 7 Cameron ^ | | – | | 5 | – | 5 | – | 0 |
| Central State (OK) | | – | | 7 | – | 2 | – | 0 |
| Wofford | | – | | 6 | – | 5 | – | 0 |
| Eastern New Mexico | | – | | 5 | – | 5 | – | 0 |
| Guilford | | – | | 5 | – | 5 | – | 0 |
| Kentucky State | | – | | 2 | – | 6 | – | 0 |
| Liberty Baptist | | – | | 1 | – | 9 | – | 0 |
| Langston | | – | | 0 | – | 10 | – | 0 |
^ – NAIA Division I playoff participant; Rankings from NAIA Division I poll

== Conference champions ==
| Conference | Champion | Record |
|---|---|---|
| Arkansas Intercollegiate | Central Arkansas | 6–0 |
| Central States | Pittsburg State | 7–0 |
| Evergreen | Oregon Tech | 5–0 |
| NIC | Moorhead State (MN) | 6–0 |
| Oklahoma | Northeastern State | 3–1 |
| RMAC | New Mexico Highlands | 7–1 |
| South Atlantic | Elon | 6–1 |
| WVIAC | Concord (WV); Fairmont State | 7–1 |
| WSUC | Wisconsin–Eau Claire | 8–0 |

== Postseason ==
Quarterfinals; December 5, 1981; Campus sites
Cameron† | 48
Central Arkansas | 24
Moorhead State | 13
Pittsburg State | 14
Hillsdale | 14
Fairmont State | 12
Elon | 38
Concord | 8

Semifinals; December 12, 1981; Campus sites
Vacant | –
Pittsburg State | –
Hillsdale | 13
Elon | 41

1981 Champion Bowl; December 19, 1981; Burlington, NC
Pittsburg State | 0
Elon* | 3

- † Cameron was disqualified after their first round win over Central Arkansas after it was discovered they had been using ineligible players.

== See also ==
- 1981 NAIA Division II football season
- 1981 NCAA Division I-A football season
- 1981 NCAA Division I-AA football season
- 1981 NCAA Division II football season
- 1981 NCAA Division III football season
