= Oli Udoh =

American football player (born 1997)

Profile
- Position: Offensive tackle

Personal information
- Born: February 14, 1997 (age 29); Fayetteville, North Carolina, U.S.
- Listed height: 6 ft 6 in (1.98 m)
- Listed weight: 320 lb (145 kg)

Career information
- High school: Terry Sanford (Fayetteville)
- College: Elon (2014–2018)
- NFL draft: 2019: 6th round, 193rd overall pick

Career history
- Minnesota Vikings (2019–2023); New Orleans Saints (2024); Tennessee Titans (2025); Arizona Cardinals (2026)*
- * Offseason or practice squad member only

Awards and highlights
- First-team All-CAA (2018)

Career NFL statistics as of 2025
- Games played: 74
- Games started: 22
- Stats at Pro Football Reference

Olisaemeka Udoh (born February 14, 1997) is an American professional football offensive tackle. He played college football for the Elon Phoenix and was drafted by the Minnesota Vikings in the sixth round, 193rd overall in the 2019 NFL draft.

== Early life ==
Born to Benjamin and Rita Udoh in Fayetteville, North Carolina, Udoh attended Terry Sanford High School. He started playing football as a defensive lineman before transitioning to the offensive side of the ball as a senior, earning second team Cape Fear Region honors after helping the program reach the playoffs for the second consecutive year. Udoh was a NCHSAA student-athlete honoree in both 2012 and 2013 and also lettered in track and field in his final season, recording a top-throw of 44 ft 5 in (13.54 m) in the shot put.

== College career ==
After taking a redshirt year in 2014, Udoh never missed a game with a total of 45 starts throughout his college career at Elon. He was named to the Colonial Athletic Association Football Academic All-Conference Team in both 2015 and 2016. In 2018, he earned a spot as a Phil Steele Football Championship Subdivision First Team All-American and was invited to the NFLPA Collegiate Bowl.

== Professional career ==
External videos
- Oli Udoh's NFL Combine Workout
- Udoh gets drafted by Minnesota

Pre-draft measurables
Height	Weight	Arm length	Hand span	Wingspan	40-yard dash	10-yard split	20-yard split	20-yard shuttle	Three-cone drill	Vertical jump	Broad jump	Bench press
6 ft 5 1/2 in (1.97 m)	323 lb (147 kg)	35 3/8 in (0.90 m)	10 in (0.25 m)	7 ft 1 1/8 in (2.16 m)	5.05 s	1.76 s	2.94 s	4.78 s	7.49 s	28.5 in (0.72 m)	8 ft 9 in (2.67 m)	26 reps
All values from 2019 NFL Combine except short shuttle and 3-cone drill from Pro Day.

=== Minnesota Vikings ===
Udoh was drafted by the Minnesota Vikings with the 193rd overall pick in the sixth round of the 2019 NFL draft.

Udoh was placed on the reserve/COVID-19 list by the Vikings on July 29, 2020. He was activated on August 13, 2020.

Udoh re-signed with the Vikings on March 18, 2023. He suffered a quad injury in Week 2 and was placed on injured reserve on September 19, 2023.

=== New Orleans Saints ===
On March 19, 2024, Udoh signed with the New Orleans Saints. He made 14 appearances for New Orleans during the 2024 season, including one start.

=== Tennessee Titans ===
On April 17, 2025, Udoh signed with the Tennessee Titans.

=== Arizona Cardinals ===
On March 20, 2026, Udoh signed a one-year, $1.4 million contract with the Arizona Cardinals. He was released by the Cardinals as a part of final roster cuts on August 30.

== Personal life ==
Udoh is of Nigerian descent.

On October 31, 2022, Udoh was arrested during the Vikings' bye week for falsely being accused of following a woman into a bathroom at a bar and refusing to leave and was charged with disorderly conduct and resisting arrest. The charges were later dismissed and his lawyer characterized the arrest as unlawful due to the evidence proving that he never entered the bathroom with a woman.

In May 2023, Udoh was cited on three occasions for traffic violations. Two of these incidents were for speeding, including driving 97 MPH in a 55 MPH zone on I-94 in St. Paul, Minnesota. He was also charged with reckless driving in a separate incident two days later.
