= Elon Phoenix football =

Football program representing Elon University

2026 Elon Phoenix football team
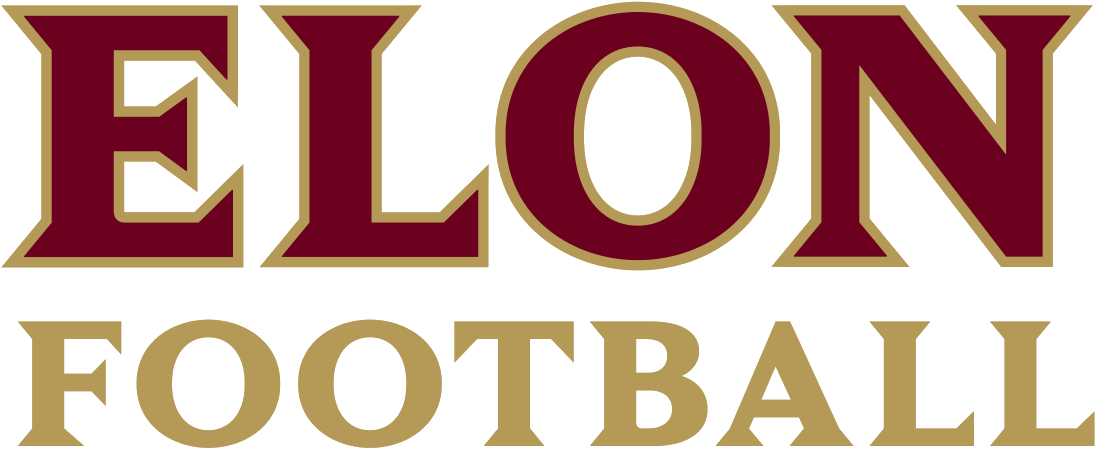
- First season: 1909; 117 years ago
- Head coach: Tony Trisciani; 7th season, 38–37 (.507)
- Location: Elon, North Carolina
- Stadium: Rhodes Stadium (capacity: 11,250)
- NCAA division: Division I FCS
- Conference: CAA Football
- Colors: Maroon and gold
- All-time record: 547–489–18 (.528)

NAIA national championships
- NAIA Division I: 1980, 1981

Conference championships
- NSC: 1933, 1934, 1935, 1936, 1938, 1941, 1957 CC: 1963, 1964, 1971, 1972, 1973, 1974 SAC: 1976, 1977, 1978, 1980, 1981
- Website: ElonPhoenix.com

The Elon Phoenix football program is the intercollegiate American football team for the Elon University located in the U.S. state of North Carolina. The school first fielded a football team in 1909 and currently competes in the NCAA Division I Football Championship Subdivision (FCS). After 11 seasons in the Southern Conference, Elon joined the Coastal Athletic Association for all sports, including football, in 2014. The Phoenix play their home games at the 13,100 seat Rhodes Stadium.

== History ==
=== Classifications ===
- 1991–1998: NCAA Division II
- 1999–present: NCAA Division I-AA/FCS

=== Conference affiliations ===
- Independent (1909–1931)
- North State Conference/Carolinas Conference (1932–1974)
- South Atlantic Conference (1975–1996)
- NCAA Division II independent (1997–1998)
- NCAA Division I-AA independent (1999–2001)
- Big South Conference (2002)
- Southern Conference (2003–2013)
- Coastal Athletic Association (2014–present)

== Postseason history ==
=== NCAA Division I-AA/FCS ===
The Phoenix have appeared in the NCAA Division I Football Championship playoffs four times. Their record combined is 0–4.

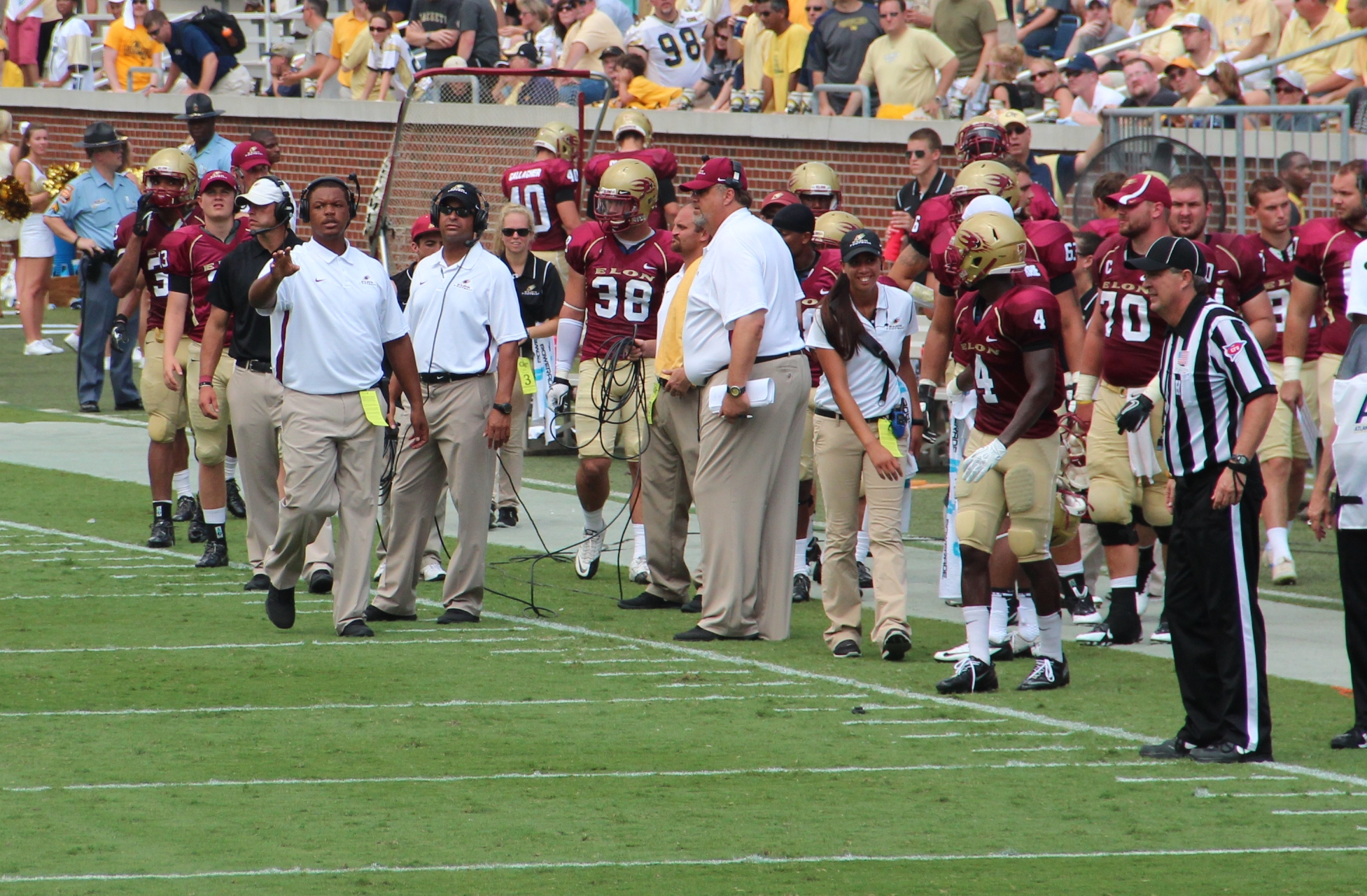
Elon players during a game v Georgia Tech in 2013

Year	Round	Opponent	Result
2009	First Round	at Richmond	L, 13–16
2017	First Round	vs. Furman	L, 27–28
2018	First Round	at Wofford	L, 7–19
2022	First Round	at Furman	L, 6–31

=== NAIA ===
The Phoenix, then known as the Fighting Christians, appeared in the NAIA playoffs six times. Their combined record was 10–4.

Year	Round	Opponent	Result
1973	Semifinals; National Championship	Wisconsin–La Crosse; Abilene Christian	W, 35–24; L, 14–42
1974	Semifinals; National Championship	Henderson State; Texas A&I	W, 21–7; L, 23–34
1976	Semifinals	Central Arkansas	L, 7–10
1978	Quarterfinals; Semifinals; National Championship	Concord; Grand Valley State; Angelo State	W, 21–6; W, 13–7; L, 14–24
1980	Quarterfinals; Semifinals; National Championship	Concord; East Texas State; Northeastern State	W, 17–14; W, 14–6; W, 17–10
1981	Quarterfinals; Semifinals; National Championship	Concord; Hillsdale; Pittsburg State	W, 38–8; W, 41–13; W, 3–0

== Championships ==
=== National ===
Year	Association	Division	Coach	Selector	Record	Opponent	Score
1980	NAIA	Division I	Jerry Tolley	Playoffs	13–1–0	Northeastern State (OK)	17–10
1981	NAIA	Division I	Jerry Tolley	Playoffs	11–1–1	Pittsburg State	3–0

=== Conference ===
Year	Coach	Conference	Record
1933	Peahead Walker	North State Conference	5–3–1
1934^{Co}	Peahead Walker	North State Conference	6–2–1
1935	Peahead Walker	North State Conference	6–4–0
1936	Peahead Walker	North State Conference	6–5–0
1938^{Co}	Horace Hendrickson	North State Conference	6–3–0
1941	Horace Hendrickson	North State Conference	8–1–0
1957	Sid Varney	North State Conference	6–0–0
1963^{Co}	George Tucker	Carolinas Conference	6–4–0
1964	George Tucker	Carolinas Conference	8–1–1
1971	Shirley Wilson	Carolinas Conference	8–3–0
1972^{Co}	Shirley Wilson	Carolinas Conference	7–3–1
1973	Shirley Wilson	Carolinas Conference	12–1–0
1974	Shirley Wilson	Carolinas Conference	10–2–0
1976	Shirley Wilson	South Atlantic Conference	11–1–0
1977	Shirley Wilson	South Atlantic Conference	9–2–0
1978^{Co}	Shirley Wilson	South Atlantic Conference	11–2–1
1980^{Co}	Jerry Tolley	South Atlantic Conference	13–1–0
1981	Jerry Tolley	South Atlantic Conference	11–1–1
Total			18

== Notable former players ==
Notable alumni include:

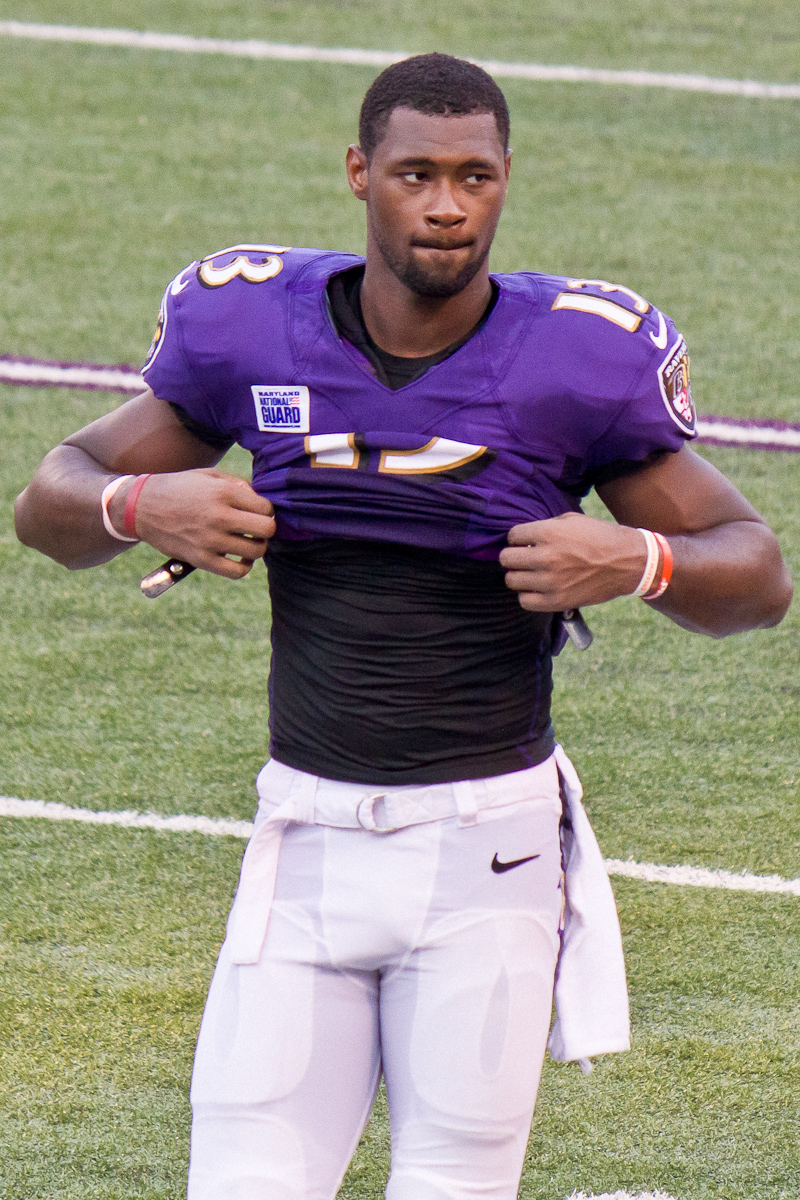
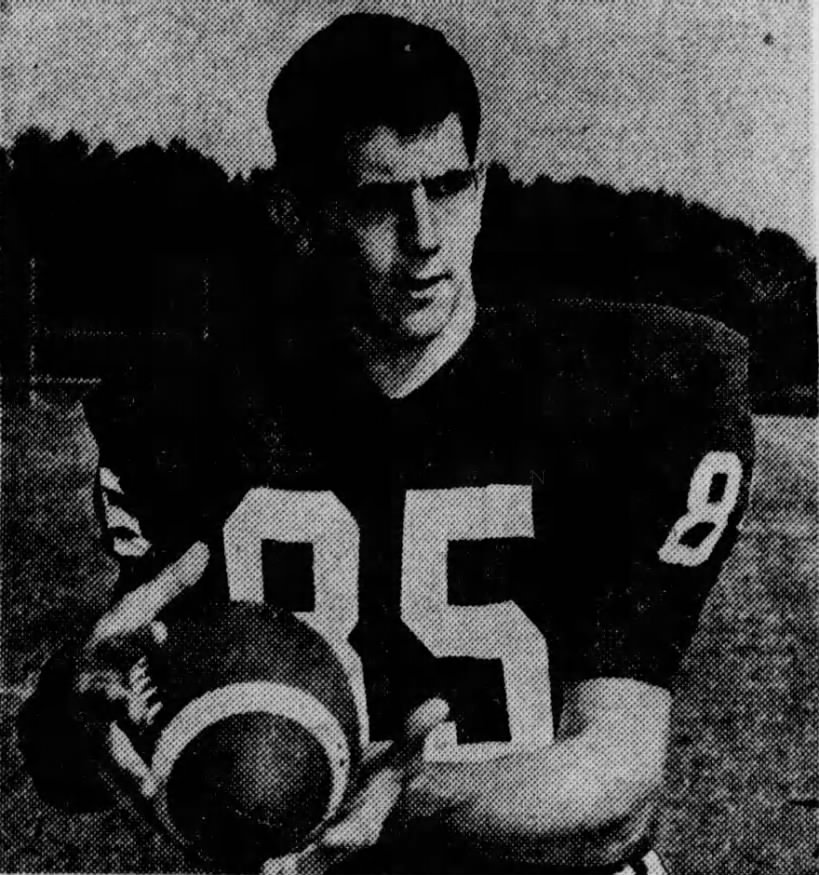
Aaron Mellette (left) and Rich McGeorge, two former Elon players
- Jack Boone
- Hal Bradley
- Joey Hackett
- Terrell Hudgins
- Dwayne Ijames
- Rich McGeorge
- Cameron McGlenn
- Shane Gillis
- Aaron Mellette
- Chad Nkang
- Tony Settles
- Jimmy Smith
- Joe West
- Oli Udoh

== Future non-conference opponents ==
Announced schedules as of July 14, 2026.

2026	2027	2028	2029	2030
Glenville State	at Charlotte	at Wake Forest	Western Carolina	at Western Carolina
at Davidson	Norfolk State	at Norfolk State		
Wofford				
at Stanford				
