= Chad Nkang =

American football player (born 1985)

No. 42
- Position: Defensive back

Personal information
- Born: July 1, 1985 (age 41); Hyattsville, Maryland, U.S.
- Listed height: 5 ft 11 in (1.80 m)
- Listed weight: 215 lb (98 kg)

Career information
- High school: Northwestern (Hyattsville)
- College: Elon
- NFL draft: 2007: 7th round, 251st overall pick

Career history
- Jacksonville Jaguars (2007–2008); Winnipeg Blue Bombers (2010); Hartford Colonials (2011)*; Omaha Nighthawks (2011)*
- * Offseason or practice squad member only

Career NFL statistics
- Total tackles: 22
- Forced fumbles: 1
- Stats at Pro Football Reference

Chad K Nkang (born July 1, 1985) is an American former professional football player who was a safety in the National Football League (NFL). He was selected by the Jacksonville Jaguars in the seventh round of the 2007 NFL draft. Nkang played college football for the Elon Phoenix.

Nkang was also a member of the Winnipeg Blue Bombers, Hartford Colonials and Omaha Nighthawks.

== Professional career ==
=== Jacksonville Jaguars ===
Nkang was selected by the Jacksonville Jaguars with the 251st overall pick in the 2007 NFL draft. He was released by the Jaguars on May 14, 2009.

=== Winnipeg Blue Bombers ===
Nkang signed with the Winnipeg Blue Bombers on April 8, 2010.

=== Omaha Nighthawks ===
Nkang signed with the Hartford Colonials in 2011, after the Colonials ceased operations, the Omaha Nighthawks picked him up in the second round of the Colonials' dispersal draft. He was released during training camp on September 6.
