= List of Mid-America Intercollegiate Athletics Association football standings =

This is a list of yearly Mid-America Intercollegiate Athletics Association football standings.

== Mid-America standings ==
1924 Missouri Intercollegiate Athletic Association football standings
	Conf.					Overall
Team	W		L		T	W		L		T
Maryville (MO) +	3	–	1	–	0	6	–	1	–	1
Kirksville +	2	–	0	–	2	6	–	2	–	1
Warrensburg	2	–	1	–	1	4	–	4	–	1
Cape Girardeau	1	–	3	–	0	3	–	3	–	2
Springfield (MO)	0	–	3	–	1	4	–	2	–	2
+ – Conference co-champions

1925 Missouri Intercollegiate Athletic Association football standings
	Conf.					Overall
Team	W		L		T	W		L		T
Maryville (MO) $	3	–	0	–	1	7	–	0	–	1
Springfield (MO)	2	–	1	–	1	4	–	2	–	2
Kirksville	1	–	2	–	1	6	–	2	–	1
Warrensburg	1	–	2	–	1	4	–	4	–	1
Cape Girardeau	1	–	3	–	0	3	–	3	–	2
$ – Conference champion

1926 Missouri Intercollegiate Athletic Association football standings
	Conf.					Overall
Team	W		L		T	W		L		T
Warrensburg $	4	–	0	–	0	7	–	0	–	1
Kirksville	3	–	1	–	0	7	–	1	–	0
Maryville (MO)	2	–	2	–	0	6	–	2	–	0
Springfield (MO)	1	–	3	–	0	3	–	5	–	0
Cape Girardeau	0	–	4	–	0	0	–	6	–	1
$ – Conference champion

1927 Missouri Intercollegiate Athletic Association football standings
	Conf.					Overall
Team	W		L		T	W		L		T
Kirksville $	4	–	0	–	0	8	–	1	–	0
Warrensburg	3	–	1	–	0	5	–	3	–	0
Springfield (MO)	2	–	2	–	0	4	–	3	–	0
Cape Girardeau	1	–	3	–	0	1	–	5	–	2
Maryville (MO)	0	–	4	–	0	1	–	7	–	0
$ – Conference champion

1928 Missouri Intercollegiate Athletic Association football standings
	Conf.					Overall
Team	W		L		T	W		L		T
Springfield (MO) +	3	–	0	–	1	7	–	1	–	1
Kirksville +	3	–	0	–	1	7	–	2	–	1
Warrensburg	1	–	2	–	1	4	–	2	–	2
Maryville (MO)	1	–	2	–	1	5	–	3	–	1
Cape Girardeau	0	–	4	–	0	1	–	5	–	1
+ – Conference co-champions

1929 Missouri Intercollegiate Athletic Association football standings
	Conf.					Overall
Team	W		L		T	W		L		T
Kirksville $	2	–	0	–	1	5	–	3	–	1
Springfield (MO)	2	–	1	–	1	6	–	2	–	1
Maryville (MO)	1	–	1	–	1	3	–	2	–	3
Cape Girardeau	1	–	1	–	0	3	–	3	–	1
Warrensburg	0	–	3	–	1	0	–	8	–	1
$ – Conference champion

1930 Missouri Intercollegiate Athletic Association football standings
	Conf.					Overall
Team	W		L		T	W		L		T
Kirksville $	3	–	0	–	0	5	–	5	–	0
Maryville (MO)	3	–	1	–	0	4	–	5	–	1
Springfield (MO)	2	–	2	–	0	4	–	5	–	0
Cape Girardeau	0	–	2	–	0	1	–	6	–	1
Warrensburg	0	–	3	–	0	4	–	4	–	1
$ – Conference champion

1931 Missouri Intercollegiate Athletic Association football standings
	Conf.					Overall
Team	W		L		T	W		L		T
Maryville (MO) $	4	–	0	–	0	9	–	0	–	0
Kirksville	2	–	1	–	1	6	–	1	–	1
Springfield (MO)	2	–	1	–	1	5	–	2	–	1
Warrensburg	1	–	3	–	0	3	–	8	–	0
Cape Girardeau	0	–	4	–	0	2	–	8	–	0
$ – Conference champion

1932 Missouri Intercollegiate Athletic Association football standings
	Conf.					Overall
Team	W		L		T	W		L		T
Kirksville $	4	–	0	–	0	8	–	0	–	0
Springfield (MO)	2	–	1	–	1	3	–	2	–	2
Maryville (MO)	2	–	2	–	0	4	–	4	–	1
Warrensburg	1	–	2	–	1	4	–	3	–	1
Cape Girardeau	0	–	4	–	0	2	–	6	–	1
$ – Conference champion

1933 Missouri Intercollegiate Athletic Association football standings
	Conf.					Overall
Team	W		L		T	W		L		T
Kirksville $	4	–	0	–	0	9	–	0	–	0
Warrensburg	3	–	1	–	0	6	–	3	–	0
Cape Girardeau	2	–	2	–	0	5	–	3	–	1
Maryville (MO)	1	–	3	–	0	1	–	8	–	0
Springfield (MO)	0	–	4	–	0	2	–	5	–	0
$ – Conference champion

1934 Missouri Intercollegiate Athletic Association football standings
	Conf.					Overall
Team	W		L		T	W		L		T
Kirksville $	4	–	0	–	0	8	–	0	–	0
Cape Girardeau	3	–	1	–	0	8	–	1	–	0
Maryville (MO)	2	–	2	–	0	4	–	5	–	0
Springfield (MO)	1	–	3	–	0	1	–	5	–	1
Warrensburg	0	–	4	–	0	4	–	4	–	1
$ – Conference champion

1935 Missouri Intercollegiate Athletic Association football standings
	Conf.					Overall
Team	W		L		T	W		L		T
Kirksville $	5	–	0	–	0	7	–	1	–	0
Cape Girardeau	3	–	2	–	0	7	–	2	–	0
Warrensburg	2	–	2	–	1	4	–	3	–	1
Springfield (MO)	2	–	2	–	1	3	–	4	–	1
Maryville (MO)	2	–	3	–	0	3	–	5	–	1
Rolla	0	–	5	–	0	1	–	7	–	0
$ – Conference champion

1936 Missouri Intercollegiate Athletic Association football standings
	Conf.					Overall
Team	W		L		T	W		L		T
Kirksville $	5	–	0	–	0	7	–	0	–	0
Warrensburg	4	–	1	–	0	6	–	2	–	0
Cape Girardeau	3	–	2	–	0	4	–	5	–	0
Maryville (MO)	1	–	3	–	1	4	–	4	–	1
Rolla	0	–	3	–	2	1	–	4	–	2
Springfield (MO)	0	–	4	–	1	1	–	5	–	2
$ – Conference champion

1937 Missouri Intercollegiate Athletic Association football standings
	Conf.					Overall
Team	W		L		T	W		L		T
Cape Girardeau $	5	–	0	–	0	9	–	0	–	0
Warrensburg	4	–	1	–	0	7	–	1	–	0
Missouri–Rolla	2	–	2	–	1	3	–	4	–	1
Kirksville	1	–	2	–	2	1	–	4	–	2
Maryville (MO)	1	–	3	–	1	2	–	5	–	2
Springfield (MO)	0	–	5	–	0	0	–	8	–	1
$ – Conference champion

1938 Missouri Intercollegiate Athletic Association football standings
	Conf.					Overall
Team	W		L		T	W		L		T
Maryville (MO) $	5	–	0	–	0	9	–	0	–	0
Rolla	3	–	2	–	0	4	–	4	–	0
Springfield (MO)	2	–	2	–	1	5	–	2	–	2
Kirksville	2	–	3	–	0	3	–	5	–	0
Warrensburg	1	–	3	–	1	2	–	5	–	1
Cape Girardeau	1	–	4	–	0	3	–	5	–	0
$ – Conference champion

1939 Missouri Intercollegiate Athletic Association football standings
	Conf.					Overall
Team	W		L		T	W		L		T
Maryville (MO) $	5	–	0	–	0	9	–	0	–	0
Springfield (MO)	3	–	1	–	1	7	–	1	–	1
Missouri Mines	3	–	2	–	0	5	–	4	–	0
Warrensburg	1	–	2	–	2	3	–	3	–	3
Cape Girardeau	1	–	3	–	1	5	–	3	–	1
Kirksville	0	–	5	–	0	2	–	6	–	0
$ – Conference champion

1940 Missouri Intercollegiate Athletic Association football standings
	Conf.					Overall
Team	W		L		T	W		L		T
Springfield (MO) $	5	–	0	–	0	10	–	0	–	0
Maryville (MO)	3	–	2	–	0	7	–	2	–	0
Missouri Mines	2	–	2	–	1	3	–	3	–	2
Warrensburg	2	–	3	–	0	5	–	4	–	0
Cape Girardeau	1	–	3	–	1	4	–	5	–	1
Kirksville	1	–	4	–	0	4	–	4	–	1
$ – Conference champion

1941 Missouri Intercollegiate Athletic Association football standings
	Conf.					Overall
Team	W		L		T	W		L		T
Maryville (MO) +	3	–	1	–	1	6	–	2	–	1
Missouri Mines +	3	–	1	–	1	4	–	3	–	2
Warrensburg	2	–	1	–	2	3	–	2	–	3
Springfield (MO)	3	–	2	–	0	8	–	3	–	0
Kirksville State	1	–	3	–	1	4	–	4	–	1
Cape Girardeau	0	–	4	–	1	4	–	4	–	1
+ – Conference co-champions; Tie games did not count in standings.

1942 Missouri Intercollegiate Athletic Association football standings
	Conf.					Overall
Team	W		L		T	W		L		T
Cape Girardeau +	3	–	1	–	0	6	–	2	–	0
Maryville (MO) +	3	–	1	–	0	4	–	2	–	1
Missouri Mines	2	–	2	–	0	3	–	4	–	0
Springfield (MO)	2	–	2	–	0	2	–	7	–	2
Warrensburg}	0	–	4	–	0	0	–	7	–	0
+ – Conference co-champions

1946 Missouri Intercollegiate Athletic Association football standings
	Conf.					Overall
Team	W		L		T	W		L		T
Southeast Missouri State $	5	–	0	–	0	8	–	0	–	1
Missouri Mines	3	–	1	–	1	4	–	3	–	2
Kirksville State	2	–	1	–	2	5	–	2	–	2
Northwest Missouri State	2	–	3	–	0	4	–	3	–	0
Southwest Missouri State	1	–	4	–	0	2	–	6	–	0
Central Missouri State	0	–	4	–	1	4	–	5	–	1
$ – Conference champion

1947 Missouri Intercollegiate Athletic Association football standings
	Conf.					Overall
Team	W		L		T	W		L		T
Missouri Mines $	4	–	1	–	0	4	–	3	–	0
SW Missouri State	3	–	1	–	1	7	–	2	–	1
NW Missouri State	2	–	1	–	2	5	–	2	–	2
Kirksville State	2	–	3	–	0	5	–	3	–	1
SE Missouri State	1	–	3	–	1	2	–	6	–	1
Central Missouri State	1	–	4	–	0	2	–	7	–	0
$ – Conference champion

1948 Missouri Intercollegiate Athletic Association football standings
	Conf.					Overall
Team	W		L		T	W		L		T
SW Missouri State +	4	–	1	–	0	9	–	2	–	0
NW Missouri State +	4	–	1	–	0	6	–	2	–	0
Missouri Mines	2	–	1	–	2	4	–	3	–	2
Kirksville State	2	–	2	–	1	4	–	3	–	2
SE Missouri State	0	–	3	–	2	0	–	7	–	2
Central Missouri State	0	–	4	–	1	0	–	7	–	2
+ – Conference co-champions

1949 Missouri Intercollegiate Athletic Association football standings
	Conf.					Overall
Team	W		L		T	W		L		T
Missouri Mines $	5	–	0	–	0	6	–	2	–	0
NW Missouri State	3	–	1	–	1	5	–	2	–	1
SW Missouri State	3	–	1	–	1	5	–	3	–	1
Central Missouri State	2	–	3	–	0	3	–	5	–	0
Kirksville State	1	–	4	–	0	2	–	7	–	0
SE Missouri State	0	–	5	–	0	2	–	7	–	0
$ – Conference champion

1950 Missouri Intercollegiate Athletic Association football standings
	Conf.					Overall
Team	W		L		T	W		L		T
Missouri Mines $	4	–	1	–	0	7	–	2	–	0
SW Missouri State	3	–	1	–	1	6	–	3	–	1
Central Missouri State	3	–	2	–	0	8	–	3	–	0
SE Missouri State	1	–	3	–	1	4	–	5	–	1
NW Missouri State	1	–	3	–	1	3	–	5	–	1
Kirksville State	0	–	2	–	3	2	–	4	–	3
$ – Conference champion

1951 Missouri Intercollegiate Athletic Association football standings
	Conf.					Overall
Team	W		L		T	W		L		T
Kirksville State +	4	–	0	–	1	7	–	1	–	1
SW Missouri State +	4	–	0	–	1	6	–	3	–	1
Missouri Mines	3	–	2	–	0	3	–	5	–	0
NW Missouri State	2	–	3	–	0	2	–	6	–	1
SE Missouri State	0	–	4	–	1	2	–	5	–	1
Central Missouri State	0	–	4	–	1	0	–	7	–	2
$ – Conference champion

1952 Missouri Intercollegiate Athletic Association football standings
	Conf.					Overall
Team	W		L		T	W		L		T
NE Missouri State +	4	–	1	–	0	7	–	1	–	0
NW Missouri State +	4	–	1	–	0	6	–	3	–	0
Missouri–Rolla	3	–	2	–	0	3	–	5	–	0
SE Missouri State	2	–	3	–	0	4	–	4	–	0
SW Missouri State	1	–	4	–	0	3	–	6	–	0
Central Missouri State	1	–	4	–	0	1	–	6	–	0
+ – Conference co-champions

1953 Missouri Intercollegiate Athletic Association football standings
	Conf.					Overall
Team	W		L		T	W		L		T
NE Missouri State $	5	–	0	–	0	6	–	2	–	0
SW Missouri State	3	–	2	–	0	3	–	6	–	0
NW Missouri State	2	–	2	–	1	3	–	4	–	1
Missouri–Rolla	2	–	3	–	0	3	–	5	–	0
SE Missouri State	1	–	2	–	2	4	–	3	–	2
Central Missouri State	0	–	4	–	1	0	–	7	–	2
$ – Conference champion

1954 Missouri Intercollegiate Athletic Association football standings
	Conf.					Overall
Team	W		L		T	W		L		T
NE Missouri State $	5	–	0	–	0	7	–	1	–	0
SE Missouri State	4	–	1	–	0	7	–	2	–	0
Missouri–Rolla	3	–	2	–	0	3	–	5	–	0
Central Missouri State	1	–	4	–	0	3	–	6	–	0
NW Missouri State	1	–	4	–	0	2	–	6	–	0
SW Missouri State	1	–	4	–	0	2	–	6	–	0
$ – Conference champion

1955 Missouri Intercollegiate Athletic Association football standings
	Conf.					Overall
Team	W		L		T	W		L		T
SE Missouri State $	5	–	0	–	0	9	–	0	–	0
Central Missouri State	4	–	1	–	0	5	–	4	–	0
Missouri–Rolla	2	–	3	–	0	4	–	5	–	0
NW Missouri State	2	–	3	–	0	2	–	5	–	1
NE Missouri State	1	–	4	–	0	3	–	5	–	0
SW Missouri State	1	–	4	–	0	2	–	6	–	1
$ – Conference champion

1956 Missouri Intercollegiate Athletic Association football standings
	Conf.					Overall
Team	W		L		T	W		L		T
Central Missouri State +	4	–	1	–	0	7	–	2	–	0
Missouri–Rolla +	4	–	1	–	0	6	–	3	–	0
NE Missouri State	3	–	2	–	0	3	–	5	–	0
SW Missouri State	3	–	2	–	0	3	–	6	–	0
NW Missouri State	1	–	4	–	0	2	–	7	–	0
SE Missouri State	0	–	5	–	0	2	–	7	–	0
+ – Conference co-champions

1957 Missouri Intercollegiate Athletic Association football standings
	Conf.					Overall
Team	W		L		T	W		L		T
SE Missouri State $	4	–	0	–	1	6	–	2	–	1
Missouri–Rolla	3	–	2	–	0	5	–	5	–	0
NE Missouri State	3	–	2	–	0	4	–	5	–	0
SW Missouri State	2	–	3	–	0	4	–	4	–	1
Central Missouri State	1	–	3	–	1	1	–	7	–	1
NW Missouri State	1	–	4	–	0	1	–	6	–	1
$ – Conference champion

1958 Missouri Intercollegiate Athletic Association football standings
	Conf.					Overall
Team	W		L		T	W		L		T
SE Missouri State $	5	–	0	–	0	7	–	1	–	1
Missouri–Rolla	4	–	1	–	0	5	–	4	–	0
NE Missouri State	3	–	2	–	0	5	–	4	–	0
SW Missouri State	2	–	3	–	0	4	–	5	–	0
Central Missouri State	1	–	4	–	0	2	–	6	–	1
NW Missouri State	0	–	5	–	0	0	–	8	–	0
$ – Conference champion

1959 Missouri Intercollegiate Athletic Association football standings
	Conf.					Overall
Team	W		L		T	W		L		T
SE Missouri State $	5	–	0	–	0	7	–	2	–	0
NE Missouri State	3	–	1	–	1	7	–	1	–	1
NW Missouri State	2	–	2	–	1	3	–	3	–	2
Missouri–Rolla	2	–	3	–	0	4	–	4	–	0
SW Missouri State	1	–	4	–	0	4	–	5	–	0
Central Missouri State	1	–	4	–	0	3	–	7	–	0
$ – Conference champion

1960 Missouri Intercollegiate Athletic Association football standings
	Conf.					Overall
Team	W		L		T	W		L		T
NE Missouri State $	5	–	0	–	0	8	–	1	–	0
SE Missouri State	4	–	1	–	0	6	–	4	–	0
NW Missouri State	3	–	2	–	0	5	–	4	–	0
SW Missouri State	2	–	3	–	0	2	–	7	–	0
Central Missouri State	1	–	4	–	0	4	–	5	–	0
Missouri–Rolla	0	–	5	–	0	0	–	9	–	0
$ – Conference champion

1961 Missouri Intercollegiate Athletic Association football standings
	Conf.					Overall
Team	W		L		T	W		L		T
NE Missouri State $	5	–	0	–	0	9	–	1	–	0
SE Missouri State	3	–	2	–	0	5	–	5	–	0
Missouri–Rolla	3	–	2	–	0	4	–	5	–	0
SW Missouri State	2	–	3	–	0	4	–	4	–	1
Central Missouri State	2	–	3	–	0	3	–	5	–	0
NW Missouri State	0	–	5	–	0	2	–	7	–	0
$ – Conference champion

1962 Missouri Intercollegiate Athletic Association football standings
	Conf.					Overall
Team	W		L		T	W		L		T
SE Missouri State $	5	–	0	–	0	7	–	3	–	0
NE Missouri State	4	–	1	–	0	7	–	2	–	0
SW Missouri State	3	–	2	–	0	5	–	3	–	1
Central Missouri State	2	–	3	–	0	2	–	6	–	1
Missouri–Rolla	1	–	4	–	0	2	–	7	–	0
NW Missouri State	0	–	5	–	0	0	–	9	–	0
$ – Conference champion

1963 Missouri Intercollegiate Athletic Association football standings
	Conf.					Overall
Team	W		L		T	W		L		T
SW Missouri State $	5	–	0	–	0	9	–	1	–	0
NE Missouri State	4	–	1	–	0	7	–	3	–	0
SE Missouri State	2	–	3	–	0	4	–	6	–	0
Missouri–Rolla	2	–	3	–	0	2	–	7	–	0
NW Missouri State	1	–	4	–	0	3	–	5	–	1
Central Missouri State	1	–	4	–	0	1	–	8	–	0
$ – Conference champion

1964 Missouri Intercollegiate Athletic Association football standings
	Conf.					Overall
Team	W		L		T	W		L		T
NE Missouri State $	5	–	0	–	0	8	–	2	–	0
SE Missouri State	4	–	1	–	0	5	–	5	–	0
SW Missouri State	3	–	2	–	0	6	–	4	–	0
NW Missouri State	2	–	3	–	0	6	–	3	–	0
Missouri–Rolla	1	–	4	–	0	1	–	8	–	0
Central Missouri State	0	–	5	–	0	1	–	8	–	0
$ – Conference champion

1965 Missouri Intercollegiate Athletic Association football standings
	Conf.					Overall
Team	W		L		T	W		L		T
NE Missouri State $	5	–	0	–	0	8	–	2	–	0
SW Missouri State	4	–	1	–	0	7	–	2	–	0
NW Missouri State	3	–	2	–	0	6	–	3	–	0
SE Missouri State	2	–	3	–	0	2	–	8	–	0
Central Missouri State	1	–	4	–	0	2	–	6	–	1
Missouri–Rolla	0	–	5	–	0	2	–	7	–	0
$ – Conference champion

1966 Missouri Intercollegiate Athletic Association football standings
	Conf.					Overall
Team	W		L		T	W		L		T
SW Missouri State $	5	–	0	–	0	7	–	4	–	0
SE Missouri State	4	–	1	–	0	5	–	5	–	0
NW Missouri State	3	–	2	–	0	4	–	5	–	0
Central Missouri State	2	–	3	–	0	4	–	5	–	0
Missouri–Rolla	1	–	4	–	0	3	–	6	–	0
NE Missouri State	0	–	5	–	0	3	–	6	–	0
$ – Conference champion

1967 Missouri Intercollegiate Athletic Association football standings
	Conf.					Overall
Team	W		L		T	W		L		T
SE Missouri State $	5	–	0	–	0	8	–	2	–	0
Central Missouri State	4	–	1	–	0	6	–	4	–	0
NE Missouri State	2	–	3	–	0	4	–	5	–	0
SW Missouri State	2	–	3	–	0	4	–	6	–	0
NW Missouri State	2	–	3	–	0	3	–	6	–	0
Missouri–Rolla	0	–	5	–	0	2	–	7	–	0
$ – Conference champion

1968 Missouri Intercollegiate Athletic Association football standings
	Conf.					Overall
Team	W		L		T	W		L		T
SE Missouri State $	5	–	0	–	0	6	–	4	–	0
Central Missouri State	4	–	1	–	0	7	–	2	–	1
NE Missouri State	2	–	3	–	0	5	–	4	–	0
Missouri–Rolla	2	–	3	–	0	4	–	5	–	0
SW Missouri State	2	–	3	–	0	2	–	8	–	0
NW Missouri State	0	–	5	–	0	0	–	9	–	0
$ – Conference champion

1969 Missouri Intercollegiate Athletic Association football standings
	Conf.					Overall
Team	W		L		T	W		L		T
SE Missouri State +	4	–	1	–	0	8	–	2	–	0
NE Missouri State +	4	–	1	–	0	6	–	2	–	1
Missouri–Rolla	3	–	2	–	0	7	–	2	–	0
Central Missouri State	2	–	3	–	0	5	–	4	–	0
NW Missouri State	2	–	3	–	0	4	–	5	–	0
SW Missouri State	0	–	5	–	0	0	–	10	–	0
$ – Conference champion

1970 Missouri Intercollegiate Athletic Association football standings
	Conf.					Overall
Team	W		L		T	W		L		T
Central Missouri State +	5	–	1	–	0	9	–	1	–	0
NE Missouri State +	5	–	1	–	0	7	–	2	–	0
SE Missouri State	4	–	2	–	0	5	–	5	–	0
Lincoln (MO)	3	–	3	–	0	7	–	3	–	0
Missouri–Rolla	2	–	3	–	1	6	–	3	–	1
SW Missouri State	1	–	4	–	1	2	–	7	–	1
NW Missouri State	0	–	6	–	0	2	–	8	–	0
+ – Conference co-champions

1971 Missouri Intercollegiate Athletic Association football standings
	Conf.					Overall
Team	W		L		T	W		L		T
NE Missouri State $	6	–	0	–	0	9	–	1	–	0
SE Missouri State	4	–	2	–	0	7	–	3	–	1
Lincoln (MO)	3	–	3	–	0	5	–	5	–	0
Missouri–Rolla	2	–	3	–	1	4	–	6	–	1
NW Missouri State	2	–	4	–	0	4	–	5	–	0
Central Missouri State	2	–	4	–	0	4	–	6	–	0
SW Missouri State	1	–	4	–	1	1	–	8	–	1
$ – Conference champion

1972 Missouri Intercollegiate Athletic Association football standings
	Conf.					Overall
Team	W		L		T	W		L		T
Lincoln (MO) +	5	–	1	–	0	9	–	1	–	0
NW Missouri State +	5	–	1	–	0	7	–	3	–	0
SE Missouri State	4	–	2	–	0	5	–	4	–	1
NE Missouri State	2	–	3	–	1	6	–	4	–	1
SW Missouri State	2	–	4	–	0	4	–	6	–	0
Central Missouri State	1	–	4	–	1	3	–	7	–	1
Missouri–Rolla	1	–	5	–	0	2	–	9	–	0
+ – Conference co-champions

1973 Missouri Intercollegiate Athletic Association football standings
	Conf.					Overall
Team	W		L		T	W		L		T
SE Missouri State $	5	–	1	–	0	6	–	4	–	0
NW Missouri State	4	–	2	–	0	6	–	4	–	0
Lincoln (MO)	3	–	3	–	0	5	–	6	–	0
SW Missouri State	3	–	3	–	0	3	–	7	–	0
Missouri–Rolla	2	–	3	–	1	3	–	6	–	2
NE Missouri State	2	–	3	–	1	2	–	7	–	2
Central Missouri State	1	–	5	–	0	2	–	8	–	0
$ – Conference champion

1974 Missouri Intercollegiate Athletic Association football standings
	Conf.					Overall
Team	W		L		T	W		L		T
NW Missouri State $	5	–	1	–	0	8	–	2	–	0
Missouri–Rolla	4	–	1	–	1	6	–	4	–	1
SW Missouri State	4	–	2	–	0	7	–	3	–	0
SE Missouri State	4	–	2	–	0	7	–	4	–	0
NE Missouri State	2	–	4	–	0	4	–	7	–	0
Central Missouri State	1	–	4	–	1	3	–	7	–	1
Lincoln (MO) *	0	–	6	–	0	3	–	8	–	0
$ – Conference champion; Lincoln's overall record includes a forfeit from Arkansas–Pine Bluff.

1975 Missouri Intercollegiate Athletic Association football standings
	Conf.					Overall
Team	W		L		T	W		L		T
SE Missouri State $	6	–	0	–	0	7	–	4	–	0
NE Missouri State	4	–	2	–	0	7	–	4	–	0
NW Missouri State	3	–	3	–	0	7	–	3	–	0
SW Missouri State	3	–	3	–	0	6	–	4	–	1
Central Missouri State	2	–	4	–	0	5	–	5	–	0
Lincoln (MO)	2	–	4	–	0	4	–	7	–	0
Missouri–Rolla	1	–	5	–	0	1	–	8	–	2
$ – Conference champion

1976 Missouri Intercollegiate Athletic Association football standings
	Conf.					Overall
Team	W		L		T	W		L		T
SE Missouri State +	4	–	1	–	1	7	–	3	–	1
NE Missouri State +	4	–	1	–	1	5	–	3	–	1
NW Missouri State	4	–	2	–	0	8	–	2	–	0
SW Missouri State	4	–	2	–	0	5	–	6	–	0
Missouri–Rolla	2	–	4	–	0	4	–	6	–	1
Central Missouri State	2	–	4	–	0	3	–	8	–	0
Lincoln (MO)	0	–	6	–	0	0	–	11	–	0
+ – Conference co-champions

1977 Missouri Intercollegiate Athletic Association football standings
	Conf.					Overall
Team	W		L		T	W		L		T
SE Missouri State +	4	–	1	–	1	7	–	3	–	1
Missouri-Rolla +	4	–	1	–	1	7	–	3	–	1
NE Missouri State	4	–	2	–	0	8	–	3	–	0
SW Missouri State	3	–	2	–	1	6	–	3	–	1
NW Missouri State	2	–	3	–	1	5	–	5	–	1
Central Missouri State	2	–	4	–	0	3	–	7	–	0
Lincoln (MO)	0	–	6	–	0	1	–	10	–	0
+ – Conference co-champions; ^ – NCAA Division II playoff participant

1978 Missouri Intercollegiate Athletic Association football standings
	Conf.					Overall
Team	W		L		T	W		L		T
SW Missouri State $	6	–	0	–	0	8	–	3	–	0
NE Missouri State	5	–	1	–	0	6	–	4	–	1
Missouri-Rolla	4	–	2	–	0	8	–	3	–	0
SE Missouri State	2	–	4	–	0	6	–	5	–	0
Lincoln (MO)	2	–	4	–	0	3	–	8	–	0
Central Missouri State	2	–	4	–	0	2	–	8	–	0
NW Missouri State	0	–	6	–	0	0	–	11	–	0
$ – Conference champion; ^ – NCAA Division II playoff participant

1979 Missouri Intercollegiate Athletic Association football standings
	Conf.					Overall
Team	W		L		T	W		L		T
NW Missouri State $	5	–	1	–	0	6	–	5	–	0
SE Missouri State	5	–	1	–	0	6	–	4	–	1
Missouri-Rolla	3	–	3	–	0	7	–	3	–	1
SW Missouri State	3	–	3	–	0	7	–	4	–	0
NE Missouri State	3	–	3	–	0	4	–	7	–	0
Central Missouri State	1	–	5	–	0	2	–	8	–	0
Lincoln (MO)	1	–	5	–	0	4	–	7	–	0
$ – Conference champion; ^ – NCAA Division II playoff participant

1980 Missouri Intercollegiate Athletic Association football standings
	Conf.					Overall
Team	W		L		T	W		L		T
Missouri–Rolla $	6	–	0	–	0	10	–	0	–	0
SW Missouri State	5	–	1	–	0	6	–	5	–	0
Central Missouri	3	–	3	–	0	6	–	3	–	1
NE Missouri State	3	–	3	–	0	5	–	6	–	0
SE Missouri State	3	–	3	–	0	4	–	7	–	0
NW Missouri State	1	–	5	–	0	2	–	8	–	0
Lincoln (MO)	0	–	6	–	0	2	–	9	–	0
$ – Conference champion

1981 Missouri Intercollegiate Athletic Association football standings
	Conf.					Overall
Team	W		L		T	W		L		T
NE Missouri State $	4	–	1	–	0	6	–	4	–	0
Missouri-Rolla	3	–	1	–	1	6	–	3	–	1
NW Missouri State	3	–	2	–	0	6	–	4	–	0
Central Missouri State	2	–	2	–	1	4	–	4	–	3
SE Missouri State	2	–	3	–	0	2	–	9	–	0
Lincoln (MO)	0	–	5	–	0	0	–	11	–	0
$ – Conference champion; ^ – NCAA Division II playoff participant

1982 Missouri Intercollegiate Athletic Association football standings
	Conf.					Overall
Team	W		L		T	W		L		T
NE Missouri State $^	5	–	0	–	0	9	–	2	–	0
Central Missouri State	3	–	2	–	0	7	–	3	–	0
Missouri-Rolla	3	–	2	–	0	8	–	3	–	0
SE Missouri State	3	–	2	–	0	5	–	5	–	1
NW Missouri State	0	–	4	–	1	2	–	7	–	1
Lincoln (MO)	0	–	4	–	1	1	–	8	–	1
$ – Conference champion; ^ – NCAA Division II playoff participant

1983 Missouri Intercollegiate Athletic Association football standings
	Conf.					Overall
Team	W		L		T	W		L		T
Missouri–Rolla +	4	–	1	–	0	8	–	2	–	0
Central Missouri State +	4	–	1	–	0	6	–	5	–	0
NE Missouri State	3	–	2	–	0	4	–	7	–	0
NW Missouri State	2	–	3	–	0	5	–	6	–	0
Lincoln (MO)	1	–	4	–	0	2	–	8	–	0
SE Missouri State	1	–	4	–	0	1	–	9	–	0
+ – Conference co-champions

1984 Missouri Intercollegiate Athletic Association football standings
	Conf.					Overall
Team	W		L		T	W		L		T
No. 5 NW Missouri State $^	5	–	0	–	0	10	–	2	–	0
Central Missouri State	4	–	1	–	0	5	–	6	–	0
NE Missouri State	3	–	2	–	0	4	–	7	–	0
Missouri–Rolla	2	–	3	–	0	6	–	4	–	0
SE Missouri State	1	–	4	–	0	1	–	10	–	0
Lincoln (MO)	0	–	5	–	0	0	–	10	–	1
$ – Conference champion; ^ – NCAA Division II playoff participant; Rankings from NCAA Division II Football Committee poll

1985 Missouri Intercollegiate Athletic Association football standings
	Conf.					Overall
Team	W		L		T	W		L		T
No. 11 NE Missouri State $	5	–	0	–	0	8	–	3	–	0
Missouri–Rolla	4	–	1	–	0	7	–	3	–	0
NW Missouri State	2	–	3	–	0	4	–	6	–	1
SE Missouri State	2	–	3	–	0	4	–	7	–	0
Central Missouri State	2	–	3	–	0	3	–	7	–	0
Lincoln (MO)	0	–	5	–	0	1	–	10	–	0
$ – Conference champion; Rankings from NCAA Division II Football Committee poll

1986 Missouri Intercollegiate Athletic Association football standings
	Conf.					Overall
Team	W		L		T	W		L		T
Central Missouri State $	5	–	0	–	0	8	–	3	–	0
SE Missouri State	4	–	1	–	0	6	–	5	–	0
NE Missouri State	3	–	2	–	0	5	–	5	–	0
Missouri–Rolla	2	–	3	–	0	5	–	6	–	0
NW Missouri State	1	–	4	–	0	2	–	9	–	0
Lincoln (MO)	0	–	5	–	0	1	–	10	–	0
$ – Conference champion

1987 Missouri Intercollegiate Athletic Association football standings
	Conf.					Overall
Team	W		L		T	W		L		T
Central Missouri State +	4	–	0	–	1	7	–	3	–	1
SE Missouri State +	4	–	0	–	1	6	–	4	–	1
NE Missouri State	3	–	2	–	0	4	–	7	–	0
Missouri–Rolla	2	–	3	–	0	5	–	5	–	0
NW Missouri State	1	–	4	–	0	3	–	8	–	0
Lincoln (MO)	0	–	5	–	0	2	–	9	–	0
+ – Conference co-champions

1988 Missouri Intercollegiate Athletic Association football standings
	Conf.					Overall
Team	W		L		T	W		L		T
NE Missouri State +	5	–	1	–	0	7	–	3	–	0
SE Missouri State +	5	–	1	–	0	6	–	4	–	0
Central Missouri State +	5	–	1	–	0	6	–	5	–	0
Missouri–Rolla	2	–	4	–	0	2	–	8	–	0
NW Missouri State	2	–	4	–	0	2	–	9	–	0
Southwest Baptist	1	–	5	–	0	2	–	8	–	0
Lincoln (MO)	1	–	5	–	0	1	–	10	–	0
+ – Conference co-champions

1989 Missouri Intercollegiate Athletic Association football standings
	Conf.					Overall
Team	W		L		T	W		L		T
No. 4 Pittsburg State $^	10	–	0	–	0	12	–	1	–	0
No. 18 NW Missouri State ^	8	–	2	–	0	9	–	3	–	0
SE Missouri State	7	–	3	–	0	7	–	4	–	0
Missouri Southern State	6	–	4	–	0	6	–	4	–	0
Southwest Baptist	5	–	5	–	0	5	–	5	–	0
Central Missouri State	5	–	5	–	0	5	–	6	–	0
Missouri Western State	5	–	5	–	0	5	–	6	–	0
NE Missouri State	4	–	6	–	0	4	–	7	–	0
Washburn	3	–	7	–	0	3	–	7	–	0
Missouri–Rolla	1	–	9	–	0	1	–	9	–	0
Lincoln (MO)	1	–	9	–	0	1	–	10	–	0
$ – Conference champion; ^ – NCAA Division II playoff participant; Rankings from NCAA Division II Football Committee poll

1990 Missouri Intercollegiate Athletic Association football standings
	Conf.					Overall
Team	W		L		T	W		L		T
No. 3 Pittsburg State $^	9	–	0	–	0	12	–	1	–	0
No. 9 NE Missouri State ^	8	–	1	–	0	9	–	2	–	0
SE Missouri State	7	–	2	–	0	7	–	3	–	0
Central Missouri State	5	–	4	–	0	5	–	5	–	0
Missouri Southern State	4	–	5	–	0	4	–	5	–	0
Washburn	4	–	5	–	0	4	–	6	–	0
Southwest Baptist	4	–	5	–	0	4	–	6	–	0
NW Missouri State	2	–	7	–	0	2	–	8	–	1
Missouri Western State	2	–	7	–	0	2	–	8	–	0
Missouri–Rolla	1	–	8	–	0	1	–	10	–	0
$ – Conference champion; ^ – NCAA Division II playoff participant; Rankings from NCAA Division II Football Committee poll

1991 Missouri Intercollegiate Athletic Association football standings
	Conf.					Overall
Team	W		L		T	W		L		T
No. 3 Pittsburg State $^	8	–	0	–	1	13	–	1	–	1
Missouri Southern	7	–	2	–	0	8	–	3	–	0
Southwest Baptist	5	–	4	–	0	7	–	4	–	0
Central Missouri State	5	–	4	–	0	5	–	6	–	0
NE Missouri State	5	–	4	–	0	5	–	6	–	0
Emporia State	4	–	5	–	0	5	–	5	–	0
NW Missouri State	4	–	5	–	0	5	–	6	–	0
Missouri–Rolla	3	–	5	–	1	4	–	6	–	1
Missouri Western	2	–	7	–	0	4	–	7	–	0
Washburn	1	–	8	–	0	1	–	10	–	0
$ – Conference champion; ^ – NCAA Division II playoff participant; Rankings from NCAA Division II Football Committee poll

1992 Mid-America Intercollegiate Athletics Association football standings
	Conf.					Overall
Team	W		L		T	W		L		T
No. 1 Pittsburg State $^	9	–	0	–	0	14	–	1	–	0
No. T–16 NE Missouri State ^	7	–	2	–	0	9	–	3	–	0
Emporia State	6	–	3	–	0	7	–	3	–	0
Central Missouri State	6	–	3	–	0	6	–	4	–	0
NW Missouri State	6	–	3	–	0	6	–	5	–	0
Missouri Western	4	–	5	–	0	5	–	6	–	0
Missouri Southern	3	–	6	–	0	4	–	6	–	0
Washburn	2	–	7	–	0	2	–	8	–	0
Southwest Baptist	1	–	8	–	0	2	–	8	–	0
Missouri–Rolla	1	–	8	–	0	2	–	9	–	0
$ – Conference champion; ^ – NCAA Division II playoff participant; Rankings from NCAA Division II Football Committee poll

1993 Mid-America Intercollegiate Athletics Association football standings
	Conf.					Overall
Team	W		L		T	W		L		T
No. 6 Missouri Southern $^	9	–	0	–	0	9	–	1	–	1
No. 17 Pittsburg State ^	8	–	1	–	0	8	–	3	–	0
Missouri Western	6	–	2	–	1	8	–	2	–	1
Central Missouri State	6	–	2	–	1	7	–	2	–	1
NE Missouri State	5	–	4	–	0	6	–	5	–	0
Emporia State	3	–	6	–	0	3	–	7	–	0
NW Missouri State	3	–	6	–	0	3	–	8	–	0
Missouri–Rolla	2	–	7	–	0	3	–	7	–	0
Southwest Baptist	2	–	7	–	0	2	–	9	–	0
Washburn	0	–	9	–	0	0	–	10	–	0
$ – Conference champion; ^ – NCAA Division II playoff participant; Rankings from NCAA Division II Football Committee poll

1994 Mid-America Intercollegiate Athletics Association football standings
	Conf.					Overall
Team	W		L		T	W		L		T
No. 3 Pittsburg State $^	9	–	0	–	0	10	–	1	–	0
No. T–8 NE Missouri State ^	7	–	2	–	0	8	–	3	–	0
Missouri Western	6	–	3	–	0	8	–	3	–	0
Central Missouri State	6	–	3	–	0	7	–	3	–	0
Missouri Southern	5	–	4	–	0	5	–	5	–	0
Missouri–Rolla	4	–	4	–	1	5	–	5	–	1
Emporia State	4	–	5	–	0	5	–	5	–	0
Washburn	2	–	7	–	0	3	–	7	–	0
Southwest Baptist	1	–	7	–	1	1	–	8	–	1
NW Missouri State	0	–	9	–	0	0	–	11	–	0
$ – Conference champion; ^ – NCAA Division II playoff participant; Rankings from NCAA Division II Football Committee poll

1995 Mid-America Intercollegiate Athletics Association football standings
	Conf.					Overall
Team	W		L		T	W		L		T
No. 4 Pittsburg State $^	9	–	0	–	0	12	–	1	–	1
No. 20 Missouri Western	6	–	3	–	0	7	–	3	–	1
NE Missouri State	6	–	3	–	0	6	–	5	–	0
NW Missouri State	6	–	3	–	0	6	–	5	–	0
Missouri Southern	5	–	4	–	0	6	–	4	–	0
Emporia State	4	–	5	–	0	5	–	6	–	0
Washburn	3	–	6	–	0	4	–	6	–	0
Central Missouri State	3	–	6	–	0	4	–	6	–	0
Southwest Baptist	2	–	7	–	0	2	–	8	–	0
Missouri–Rolla	1	–	8	–	0	1	–	9	–	0
$ – Conference champion; ^ – NCAA Division II playoff participant; Rankings from NCAA Division II Football Committee poll

1996 Mid-America Intercollegiate Athletics Association football standings
	Conf.			Overall
Team	W		L	W		L
No. 2 Northwest Missouri State +^	8	–	1	11	–	2
No. 7 Pittsburg State +^	8	–	1	8	–	3
Truman State	7	–	2	7	–	4
Missouri Western State	5	–	4	7	–	4
Missouri Southern State	5	–	4	6	–	4
Emporia State	5	–	4	5	–	6
Washburn	4	–	5	4	–	6
Central Missouri State	2	–	7	4	–	7
Missouri–Rolla	1	–	8	3	–	8
Southwest Baptist	0	–	9	0	–	10
+ – Conference co-champions; ^ – NCAA Division II playoff participant; Rankings from NCAA Division II Football Committee poll

1997 Mid-America Intercollegiate Athletics Association football standings
	Conf.			Overall
Team	W		L	W		L
No. 3 NW Missouri State $^	9	–	0	12	–	1
No. 8 Pittsburg State ^	8	–	1	9	–	2
Missouri Southern	6	–	3	7	–	3
Truman State	6	–	3	6	–	4
Emporia State	5	–	4	7	–	4
Central Missouri State	4	–	5	5	–	6
Missouri Western	3	–	6	5	–	6
Washburn	2	–	7	3	–	8
Missouri–Rolla	2	–	7	3	–	8
Southwest Baptist	0	–	9	0	–	10
$ – Conference champion; ^ – NCAA Division II playoff participant; Rankings from NCAA Division II Football Committee poll

1998 Mid-America Intercollegiate Athletics Association football standings
	Conf.			Overall
Team	W		L	W		L
No. 2 NW Missouri State $^	9	–	0	15	–	0
No. 10 Emporia State	7	–	2	9	–	2
Central Missouri State	6	–	3	8	–	3
Pittsburg State	6	–	3	7	–	3
Truman State	6	–	3	6	–	5
Missouri Western	3	–	6	5	–	6
Washburn	3	–	6	4	–	6
Missouri Southern	3	–	6	3	–	7
Southwest Baptist	2	–	7	3	–	8
Missouri–Rolla	0	–	9	0	–	11
$ – Conference champion; ^ – NCAA Division II playoff participant; Rankings from NCAA Division II Football Committee poll

1999 Mid-America Intercollegiate Athletics Association football standings
	Conf.			Overall
Team	W		L	W		L
No. 4 NW Missouri State $^	9	–	0	14	–	1
No. 7 Pittsburg State ^	8	–	1	10	–	2
Missouri Western	6	–	3	7	–	4
Central Missouri State	5	–	4	7	–	4
Washburn	4	–	5	6	–	5
Emporia State	4	–	5	5	–	6
Truman State	4	–	5	4	–	7
Missouri Southern	3	–	6	5	–	6
Southwest Baptist	2	–	7	2	–	9
Missouri–Rolla	0	–	9	2	–	9
$ – Conference champion; ^ – NCAA Division II playoff participant; Rankings from NCAA Division II Football Committee poll

2000 Mid-America Intercollegiate Athletics Association football standings
	Conf.			Overall
Team	W		L	W		L
No. 1 NW Missouri State $^	9	–	0	11	–	1
No. 7 Missouri Western State	8	–	1	8	–	4
No. 4 Pittsburg State ^	7	–	2	9	–	3
No. 10 Central Missouri State	5	–	4	7	–	4
Emporia State	5	–	4	6	–	5
Truman	5	–	4	6	–	5
Washburn	3	–	6	5	–	6
Missouri Southern State	2	–	7	2	–	9
Southwest Baptist	1	–	8	2	–	9
Missouri–Rolla	0	–	9	2	–	9
$ – Conference champion; ^ – NCAA Division II playoff participant; Rankings from AFCA Midwest Region poll

2001 Mid-America Intercollegiate Athletics Association football standings
	Conf.			Overall
Team	W		L	W		L
No. 6 Pittsburg State $^	8	–	1	11	–	2
No. 20 Central Missouri State	7	–	2	10	–	2
Truman	6	–	3	8	–	3
Missouri Western	6	–	3	8	–	3
NW Missouri State	6	–	3	7	–	4
Southwest Baptist	4	–	5	6	–	5
Emporia State	3	–	6	5	–	6
Missouri Southern	3	–	6	4	–	6
Washburn	2	–	7	3	–	8
Missouri–Rolla	0	–	9	2	–	9
$ – Conference champion; ^ – NCAA Division II playoff participant; Rankings from AFCA poll

2002 Mid-America Intercollegiate Athletics Association football standings
	Conf.			Overall
Team	W		L	W		L
No. 4 NW Missouri State $^	9	–	0	12	–	1
No. 8 Central Missouri State ^	8	–	1	10	–	2
No. 23 Emporia State	6	–	3	9	–	3
No. 13 Pittsburg State	6	–	3	8	–	3
Missouri Western	4	–	5	6	–	5
Truman	3	–	6	5	–	6
Missouri Southern	3	–	6	5	–	6
Washburn	3	–	6	3	–	8
Southwest Baptist	2	–	7	3	–	8
Missouri–Rolla	0	–	9	0	–	11
$ – Conference champion; ^ – NCAA Division II playoff participant; Rankings from AFCA poll

2003 Mid-America Intercollegiate Athletics Association football standings
	Conf.			Overall
Team	W		L	W		L
No. 15 Central Missouri State +	7	–	2	9	–	2
No. 16 Emporia State +^	7	–	2	9	–	3
Missouri Western # +	7	–	2	9	–	3
No. 13 Pittsburg State +^	7	–	2	9	–	3
No. 25 NW Missouri State +	7	–	2	8	–	3
Truman	4	–	5	4	–	7
Washburn	3	–	6	5	–	6
Southwest Baptist	2	–	7	3	–	8
Missouri Southern	1	–	8	1	–	10
Missouri–Rolla	0	–	9	0	–	11
+ – Conference co-champions; ^ – NCAA Division II playoff participant; # – Mineral Water Bowl participant; Rankings from AFCA poll

2004 Mid-America Intercollegiate Athletics Association football standings
	Conf.			Overall
Team	W		L	W		L
No. 2 Pittsburg State $^	9	–	0	14	–	1
No. 3 NW Missouri State ^	8	–	1	11	–	2
Washburn #	6	–	3	8	–	4
Central Missouri State	5	–	4	7	–	4
Emporia State	4	–	5	5	–	6
Missouri Southern	4	–	5	5	–	6
Missouri Western	4	–	5	5	–	6
Missouri–Rolla	2	–	7	3	–	8
Truman	2	–	7	2	–	9
Southwest Baptist	1	–	8	2	–	9
$ – Conference champion; ^ – NCAA Division II playoff participant; # – Mineral Water Bowl participant; Rankings from AFCA poll

2005 Mid-America Intercollegiate Athletics Association football standings
	Conf.			Overall
Team	W		L	W		L
No. 13 Washburn $^	7	–	1	9	–	3
No. 25 Missouri Western #	6	–	2	9	–	3
No. 2 NW Missouri State ^	6	–	2	11	–	4
No. 12 Pittsburg State ^	6	–	2	10	–	4
Central Missouri State	5	–	3	7	–	3
Emporia State	3	–	5	4	–	6
Missouri Southern	2	–	6	3	–	7
Southwest Baptist	2	–	7	3	–	8
Truman	0	–	8	2	–	9
$ – Conference champion; ^ – NCAA Division II playoff participant; # – Mineral Water Bowl participant; Rankings from AFCA poll

2006 Mid-America Intercollegiate Athletics Association football standings
	Conf.			Overall
Team	W		L	W		L
No. 2 NW Missouri State $^	9	–	0	14	–	1
No. 15 Pittsburg State #	7	–	2	10	–	2
No. 16 Missouri Western ^	7	–	2	9	–	3
Washburn	6	–	3	7	–	4
Truman	6	–	3	6	–	5
Central Missouri	3	–	6	5	–	6
Missouri Southern	3	–	6	5	–	6
Emporia State	2	–	7	3	–	8
Fort Hays State	1	–	8	1	–	10
Southwest Baptist	1	–	8	1	–	10
$ – Conference champion; ^ – NCAA Division II playoff participant; # – Mineral Water Bowl participant; Rankings from AFCA poll

2007 Mid-America Intercollegiate Athletics Association football standings
	Conf.			Overall
Team	W		L	W		L
No. 2 NW Missouri State $^	9	–	0	12	–	2
No. 24 Washburn ^	7	–	2	8	–	4
Missouri Western #	6	–	3	9	–	3
Pittsburg State	6	–	3	8	–	3
Central Missouri	6	–	3	7	–	4
Missouri Southern	4	–	5	6	–	5
Truman	4	–	5	6	–	5
Fort Hays State	2	–	7	4	–	7
Emporia State	1	–	8	3	–	8
Southwest Baptist	0	–	9	0	–	11
$ – Conference champion; ^ – NCAA Division II playoff participant; # – Mineral Water Bowl participant; Rankings from AFCA poll

2008 Mid-America Intercollegiate Athletics Association football standings
	Conf.			Overall
Team	W		L	W		L
No. 2 NW Missouri State $^	9	–	0	13	–	2
No. 8 Pittsburg State ^	8	–	1	11	–	2
No. 22 Nebraska–Omaha ^	6	–	3	7	–	4
Central Missouri	5	–	4	7	–	4
Missouri Western #	5	–	4	6	–	6
Washburn	4	–	5	6	–	5
Truman	3	–	6	4	–	7
Emporia State	2	–	7	4	–	7
Missouri Southern	2	–	7	4	–	7
Fort Hays State	1	–	8	2	–	9
$ – Conference champion; ^ – NCAA Division II playoff participant; # – Mineral Water Bowl participant; Rankings from AFCA poll

2009 Mid-America Intercollegiate Athletics Association football standings
	Conf.			Overall
Team	W		L	W		L
No. 1 NW Missouri State $^	9	–	0	14	–	1
Missouri Western #	6	–	3	9	–	3
Central Missouri	6	–	3	8	–	3
No. 25 Washburn	6	–	3	8	–	3
Nebraska–Omaha #	6	–	3	7	–	5
Fort Hays State	4	–	5	6	–	5
Pittsburg State	3	–	6	5	–	6
Missouri Southern	3	–	6	3	–	7
Emporia State	1	–	8	2	–	9
Truman	1	–	8	2	–	9
$ – Conference champion; ^ – NCAA Division II playoff participant; # – bowl game participant (Missouri Western: Mineral Water Bowl, Nebraska–Omaha: Kanza Bowl; Rankings from AFCA poll)

2010 Mid-America Intercollegiate Athletics Association football standings
	Conf.			Overall
Team	W		L	W		L
No. 3 NW Missouri State $^	9	–	0	12	–	1
No. 5 Central Missouri ^	8	–	1	11	–	3
Washburn #	6	–	3	8	–	4
No. 24 Missouri Western ^	6	–	3	8	–	4
Nebraska–Omaha	5	–	4	5	–	6
Pittsburg State #	3	–	6	6	–	6
Emporia State	3	–	6	5	–	6
Missouri Southern	2	–	7	4	–	7
Truman	2	–	7	4	–	7
Fort Hays State	1	–	8	3	–	8
$ – Conference champion; ^ – NCAA Division II playoff participant; # – bowl game participant (Washburn: Kanza Bowl, Pittsburg State: Mineral Water Bowl; Rankings from AFCA poll

2011 Mid-America Intercollegiate Athletics Association football standings
	Conf.			Overall
Team	W		L	W		L
No. 1 Pittsburg State $^	8	–	1	13	–	1
No. 5 NW Missouri State ^	7	–	2	11	–	3
No. 11 Washburn ^	7	–	2	10	–	3
No. 18 Missouri Western ^	7	–	2	9	–	3
Central Missouri #	6	–	3	8	–	4
Emporia State	3	–	6	5	–	6
Fort Hays State	3	–	6	4	–	7
Truman	2	–	7	4	–	7
Missouri Southern	2	–	7	3	–	7
Lincoln (MO)	0	–	9	1	–	9
$ – Conference champion; ^ – NCAA Division II playoff participant; # – Kanza Bowl participant; Rankings from AFCA poll

2012 Mid-America Intercollegiate Athletics Association football standings
	Conf.			Overall
Team	W		L	W		L
No. 5 Missouri Western $^	9	–	1	12	–	2
No. 22 Emporia State #	9	–	2	10	–	2
No. 10 NW Missouri State ^	8	–	2	10	–	3
Pittsburg State	7	–	3	7	–	3
Lindenwood #*	7	–	3	8	–	4
Washburn	7	–	4	7	–	4
Central Missouri	6	–	4	6	–	4
Missouri Southern	5	–	5	6	–	5
Fort Hays State	4	–	6	5	–	6
Northeastern State	4	–	6	4	–	6
Truman	3	–	7	4	–	7
Southwest Baptist	3	–	8	3	–	8
Nebraska–Kearney	2	–	8	3	–	8
Central Oklahoma	2	–	8	2	–	8
Lincoln (MO)	1	–	10	1	–	10
$ – Conference champion; ^ – NCAA Division II playoff participant; # – bowl game participant (Emporia State: Kanza Bowl, Lindenwood: Mineral Water Bowl) * – provisional NCAA Division II member; Rankings from AFCA poll

2013 Mid-America Intercollegiate Athletics Association football standings
	Conf.			Overall
Team	W		L	W		L
No. 1 NW Missouri State $^	10	–	0	15	–	0
No. 20 Emporia State ^	9	–	1	9	–	2
No. 19 Pittsburg State #	7	–	2	10	–	2
Missouri Western	7	–	3	8	–	3
Washburn	7	–	3	8	–	3
Missouri Southern	5	–	3	7	–	3
Central Missouri	5	–	4	6	–	4
Fort Hays State	4	–	5	6	–	5
Nebraska–Kearney	3	–	6	3	–	8
Lindenwood	2	–	6	3	–	6
Lincoln (MO)	2	–	8	3	–	8
Central Oklahoma	2	–	8	2	–	8
Northeastern State	2	–	8	2	–	9
Southwest Baptist	1	–	9	1	–	10
$ – Conference champion; ^ – NCAA Division II playoff participant; # – Mineral Water Bowl participant; Rankings from AFCA poll

2014 Mid-America Intercollegiate Athletics Association football standings
	Conf.			Overall
Team	W		L	W		L
No. 7 Pittsburg State +^	10	–	1	11	–	2
No. 14 NW Missouri State +^	10	–	1	10	–	2
Central Oklahoma #	8	–	3	8	–	4
Central Missouri #	7	–	4	8	–	4
Fort Hays State	7	–	4	7	–	4
Missouri Western	7	–	4	7	–	4
Emporia State	4	–	7	4	–	7
Missouri Southern	4	–	7	4	–	7
Washburn	4	–	7	4	–	7
Nebraska–Kearney	3	–	8	3	–	8
Lindenwood	2	–	9	2	–	9
Northeastern State	0	–	11	0	–	11
$ – Conference champion; ^ – NCAA Division II playoff participant; # – bowl game participant (Central Oklahoma: Mineral Water Bowl, Central Missouri: Live United Texarkana Bowl); Rankings from AFCA poll

2015 Mid-America Intercollegiate Athletics Association football standings
	Conf.			Overall
Team	W		L	W		L
No. 1 NW Missouri State $^	11	–	0	15	–	0
No. 8 Emporia State ^	9	–	2	11	–	3
Central Missouri	8	–	3	8	–	3
Fort Hays State #	8	–	3	8	–	4
Central Oklahoma #	6	–	5	7	–	5
Missouri Western	6	–	5	6	–	5
Pittsburg State	6	–	5	6	–	5
Washburn	5	–	6	5	–	6
Lindenwood	3	–	8	3	–	8
Northeastern State	3	–	8	3	–	8
Missouri Southern	1	–	10	1	–	10
Nebraska–Kearney	0	–	11	0	–	11
$ – Conference champion; ^ – NCAA Division II playoff participant; # – bowl participant (Fort Hays State: Mineral Water Bowl, Central Oklahoma: Live United Texarkana Bowl; Rankings from AFCA poll)

2016 Mid-America Intercollegiate Athletics Association football standings
	Conf.			Overall
Team	W		L	W		L
No. 1 NW Missouri State $^	11	–	0	15	–	0
No. 10 Emporia State ^	10	–	1	11	–	2
No. 21 Central Missouri ^	9	–	2	9	–	3
Fort Hays State #	7	–	4	8	–	4
Pittsburg State	7	–	4	7	–	4
Washburn #	7	–	4	7	–	5
Missouri Western	4	–	7	4	–	7
Central Oklahoma	3	–	8	3	–	8
Lindenwood	3	–	8	3	–	8
Missouri Southern	2	–	9	2	–	9
Northeastern State	2	–	9	2	–	9
Nebraska–Kearney	1	–	10	1	–	10
$ – Conference champion; ^ – NCAA Division II playoff participant; # – bowl participant (Wahsburn: Mineral Water Bowl, Fort Hays State: C.H.A.M.P.S. Heart of Texas Bowl; Rankings from AFCA poll)

2017 Mid-America Intercollegiate Athletics Association football standings
	Conf.			Overall
Team	W		L	W		L
No. 8 Fort Hays State $^	11	–	0	11	–	1
No. 16 NW Missouri State ^	9	–	2	9	–	3
Central Missouri #	8	–	3	9	–	3
Central Oklahoma #	7	–	4	8	–	4
Pittsburg State #	7	–	4	8	–	4
Washburn #	6	–	5	7	–	5
Emporia State	6	–	5	6	–	5
Lindenwood	4	–	7	4	–	7
Missouri Western	4	–	7	4	–	7
Nebraska–Kearney	3	–	8	3	–	8
Northeastern State	1	–	10	1	–	10
Missouri Southern	0	–	11	0	–	11
$ – Conference champion; ^ – NCAA Division II playoff participant; # – bowl participant (Central Missouri: Mineral Water Bowl, Central Oklahoma: Heritage Bowl, Pittsburg State: Live United Texarkana Bowl, Washburn: C.H.A.M.P.S. Heart of Texas Bowl); Rankings from AFCA Poll

2018 Mid-America Intercollegiate Athletics Association football standings
	Conf.			Overall
Team	W		L	W		L
No. 10 NW Missouri State +^	9	–	2	10	–	3
No. 22 Fort Hays State +^	9	–	2	9	–	3
Pittsburg State	8	–	3	8	–	3
Central Oklahoma #	7	–	4	8	–	4
Emporia State #	7	–	4	8	–	4
Missouri Western #	6	–	5	7	–	5
Central Missouri	5	–	6	5	–	6
Nebraska–Kearney	5	–	6	5	–	6
Washburn	5	–	6	5	–	6
Lindenwood	4	–	7	4	–	7
Missouri Southern	1	–	10	1	–	10
Northeastern State	0	–	11	0	–	11
$ – Conference champion; ^ – NCAA Division II playoff participant; # – bowl participant (Emporia State: Heritage Bowl, Missouri Western: Live United Texarkana Bowl, Central Oklahoma: C.H.A.M.P.S. Heart of Texas Bowl); Rankings from AFCA Poll

2019 Mid-America Intercollegiate Athletics Association football standings
	Conf.			Overall
Team	W		L	W		L
No. 7 NW Missouri State +^	10	–	1	12	–	2
No. 13 Central Missouri +^	10	–	1	11	–	2
Missouri Western #	8	–	3	9	–	3
Fort Hays State	8	–	3	8	–	3
Nebraska–Kearney #	6	–	5	7	–	5
Pittsburg State	6	–	5	6	–	5
Washburn	6	–	5	6	–	5
Central Oklahoma	5	–	6	5	–	6
Emporia State	4	–	7	4	–	7
Missouri Southern	2	–	9	2	–	9
Lincoln (MO)	1	–	10	1	–	10
Northeastern State	0	–	11	0	–	11
+ – Conference co-champions; ^ – NCAA Division II playoff participant; # – bowl participant (Missouri Western: Live United Texarkana Bowl, Nebraska-Kearney: Mineral Water Bowl); Rankings from AFCA poll

2020 Mid-America Intercollegiate Athletics Association football standings
	Conf.			Overall
Team	W		L	W		L
Nebraska–Kearney		–		2	–	0
Missouri Southern		–		1	–	0
Pittsburg State		–		2	–	2
Northeastern State		–		0	–	1
Missouri Western		–		0	–	2
Lincoln (MO)		–		0	–	2
Notes: Due to COVID-19, the Mid-America Intercollegiate Athletics Association suspended the fall 2020 football season. The conference also announced no in-conference competition for spring 2021 play, schools scheduled own games if desired to play. Nebraska–Kearney, Pittsburg State and Missouri Western played only in the fall, while Missouri Southern, Northeastern State and Lincoln (MO) played only in the spring. Central Missouri, Central Oklahoma, Emporia State, Fort Hays State, NW Missouri State and Washburn opted out of the season.; Rankings from AP Poll

2021 Mid-America Intercollegiate Athletics Association football standings
	Conf.			Overall
Team	W		L	W		L
No. 4 NW Missouri State $^	9	–	1	11	–	2
No. 15 Nebraska–Kearney ^	9	–	2	10	–	3
No. 25 Washburn ^	9	–	2	9	–	3
Pittsburg State	8	–	3	8	–	3
Missouri Western	6	–	5	6	–	5
Emporia State #	6	–	5	6	–	6
Fort Hays State	5	–	6	5	–	6
Central Oklahoma	4	–	7	4	–	7
Central Missouri	4	–	7	4	–	7
Missouri Southern	3	–	8	3	–	8
Northeastern State	2	–	9	2	–	9
Lincoln (MO)	0	–	10	0	–	10
$ – Conference champion; ^ – NCAA Division II playoff participant; # – Live United Texarkana Bowl participant; Rankings from AFCA Poll

2022 Mid-America Intercollegiate Athletics Association football standings
	Conf.			Overall
Team	W		L	W		L
No. 5 Pittsburg State $^	11	–	0	12	–	1
No. 8 NW Missouri State ^	9	–	2	10	–	3
Emporia State #	8	–	3	9	–	3
Nebraska–Kearney	8	–	3	8	–	3
Washburn	7	–	4	7	–	4
Central Oklahoma	6	–	5	6	–	5
Missouri Western	5	–	6	5	–	6
Central Missouri	4	–	7	4	–	7
Missouri Southern	4	–	7	4	–	7
Fort Hays State	3	–	8	3	–	8
Northeastern State	1	–	10	1	–	10
Lincoln (MO)	0	–	11	0	–	11
$ – Conference champion; ^ – NCAA Division II playoff participant; # – Live United Texarkana Bowl participant; Rankings from AFCA Poll

2023 Mid-America Intercollegiate Athletics Association football standings
	Conf.			Overall
Team	W		L	W		L
No. 6 Central Missouri +^	9	–	1	11	–	2
No. 5 Pittsburg State +^	9	–	1	11	–	2
Emporia State #	7	–	3	9	–	3
Missouri Western #	7	–	3	8	–	4
Fort Hays State	6	–	4	7	–	4
NW Missouri State	6	–	4	7	–	4
Central Oklahoma	4	–	6	5	–	6
Missouri Southern	4	–	6	5	–	6
Nebraska–Kearney	2	–	8	3	–	8
Washburn	1	–	9	2	–	9
Northeastern State	0	–	10	1	–	10
+ – Conference co-champions; ^ – NCAA Division II playoff participant; # – bowl participant (Emporia State: Heritage Bowl, Missouri Western: Live United Texarkana Bowl); Rankings from AFCA Poll

2024 Mid-America Intercollegiate Athletics Association football standings
	Conf.			Overall
Team	W		L	W		L
No. 9 Central Oklahoma $^	8	–	1	11	–	2
No. 17 Pittsburg State ^	7	–	2	8	–	3
Central Missouri #	6	–	3	9	–	3
Fort Hays State	6	–	3	8	–	3
Emporia State	5	–	4	7	–	4
NW Missouri State	5	–	4	6	–	5
Nebraska–Kearney	3	–	6	5	–	6
Washburn	2	–	7	3	–	8
Missouri Western	2	–	7	4	–	7
Missouri Southern	1	–	8	2	–	9
$ – Conference champion; ^ – NCAA Division II playoff participant; # – Heritage Bowl participant; Rankings from AFCA Poll

2025 Mid-America Intercollegiate Athletics Association football standings
	Conf.			Overall
Team	W		L	W		L
No. 6 Pittsburg State +^	8	–	1	10	–	3
No. 17 NW Missouri State +^	8	–	1	9	–	3
Central Oklahoma	6	–	3	6	–	5
Fort Hays State	5	–	4	6	–	5
Central Missouri	5	–	4	5	–	6
Nebraska–Kearney	4	–	5	6	–	5
Emporia State	4	–	5	5	–	6
Missouri Western	2	–	7	3	–	8
Washburn	2	–	7	3	–	8
Missouri Southern	1	–	8	3	–	8
+ – Conference co-champions; ^ – NCAA Division II playoff participant; Rankings from AFCA Poll
