= 2014 Northeastern State RiverHawks football team =

American college football season

2014 Northeastern State RiverHawks football
- Conference: Mid-America Intercollegiate Athletic Association
- Record: 0–11 (0–11 MIAA)
- Head coach: Rob Robinson (1st season)
- Offensive coordinator: Paul Lane (3rd season)
- Offensive scheme: Multiple
- Defensive coordinator: Josh Lattimer (1st season)
- Base defense: 3–3–5
- Home stadium: Doc Wadley Stadium

2014 Mid-America Intercollegiate Athletics Association football standings
	Conf.			Overall
Team	W		L	W		L
No. 7 Pittsburg State +^	10	–	1	11	–	2
No. 14 NW Missouri State +^	10	–	1	10	–	2
Central Oklahoma #	8	–	3	8	–	4
Central Missouri #	7	–	4	8	–	4
Fort Hays State	7	–	4	7	–	4
Missouri Western	7	–	4	7	–	4
Emporia State	4	–	7	4	–	7
Missouri Southern	4	–	7	4	–	7
Washburn	4	–	7	4	–	7
Nebraska–Kearney	3	–	8	3	–	8
Lindenwood	2	–	9	2	–	9
Northeastern State	0	–	11	0	–	11
$ – Conference champion; ^ – NCAA Division II playoff participant; # – bowl game participant (Central Oklahoma: Mineral Water Bowl, Central Missouri: Live United Texarkana Bowl); Rankings from AFCA poll

The 2014 Northeastern State RiverHawks football team represented Northeastern State University during the 2014 NCAA Division II football season, in the MIAA conference. Northeastern State lost every game, their record was 0-11 (0-11 MIAA). All of Northeastern State's games were in the MIAA.

== Schedule ==
Date	Time	Opponent	Site	Result	Attendance
September 6	7:00 p.m.	at No. 9 Pittsburg State	Carnie Smith Stadium; Pittsburg, KS	L 0–37	10,814
September 13	2:00 p.m.	Fort Hays State	Doc Wadley Stadium; Tahlequah, OK	L 13–48	2,321
September 20	6:00 p.m.	at Missouri Western	Spratt Stadium; St. Joseph, MO	L 0–30	4,991
September 27	6:00 p.m.	Emporia State	Doc Wadley Stadium; Tahlequah, OK	L 35–42 ^{2OT}	2,017
October 4	1:00 p.m.	at No. 1 NW Missouri State	Bearcat Stadium; Maryville, MO	L 7–49	6,574
October 11	1:00 p.m.	Nebraska–Kearney	Doc Wadley Stadium; Tahlequah, OK	L 7–34	1,026
October 18	2:00 p.m.	at Missouri Southern	Fred G. Hughes Stadium; Joplin, MO	L 7–34	5,517
October 25	1:00 p.m.	Central Missouri^{†}	Doc Wadley Stadium; Tahlequah, OK	L 14–56	2,102
November 1	2:00 p.m.	at Central Oklahoma	Wantland Stadium; Edmond, OK (rivalry)	L 10–28	6,128
November 8	1:00 p.m.	at Washburn	Yager Stadium; Topeka, KS	L 7–42	3,812
November 15	1:00 p.m.	Lindenwood	Doc Wadley Stadium; Tahlequah, OK	L 16–35	1,137
^{†}Homecoming; Rankings from AFCA Poll released prior to the game; All times are in Central time

== Game summaries ==
=== At No. 9 Pittsburg State ===
	1	2	3	4	Total
RiverHawks	0	0	0	0	0
No. 9 Gorillas	17	10	7	3	37

Statistics	NESU	PSU
First downs	10	22
Total yards	180	396
Rushing yards	48	169
Passing yards	132	227
Turnovers	3	1
Time of possession	28:23	31:37

Team	Category	Player	Statistics
Northeastern State	Passing	Kevin Pantastico	13/28, 132 yards, 2 INT
Northeastern State	Rushing	Kevin Pantastico	12 rushes, 13 yards
Northeastern State	Receiving	Garrett Powell	3 receptions, 45 yards
Pittsburg State	Passing	Anthony Abenoja	18/23, 230 yards, TD
Pittsburg State	Rushing	Anthony Abenoja	9 rushes, 49 yards, TD
Pittsburg State	Receiving	Marquise Cushon	4 receptions, 96 yards

=== Fort Hays State ===
	1	2	3	4	Total
Tigers	7	13	14	14	48
RiverHawks	6	0	0	7	13

Statistics	FHSU	NESU
First downs	26	19
Total yards	408	345
Rushing yards	197	48
Passing yards	211	297
Turnovers	1	4
Time of possession	35:29	24:31

Team	Category	Player	Statistics
Fort Hays State	Passing	Treveon Albert	12/22, 149 yards, 3 TD, INT
Fort Hays State	Rushing	Edward Smith	10 rushes, 70 yards, TD
Fort Hays State	Receiving	Ed Williams	8 receptions, 113 yards, TD
Northeastern State	Passing	Kevin Pantastico	23/37, 297 yards, 2 TD, 2 INT
Northeastern State	Rushing	Derrick Moore	5 rushes, 27 yards
Northeastern State	Receiving	Ricki Herod	4 receptions, 97 yards, TD

=== At Missouri Western ===
	1	2	3	4	Total
RiverHawks	0	0	0	0	0
Griffons	3	14	10	3	30

Statistics	NESU	MWSU
First downs	13	19
Total yards	252	322
Rushing yards	67	198
Passing yards	185	124
Turnovers	4	0
Time of possession	31:25	28:35

Team	Category	Player	Statistics
Northeastern State	Passing	Kevin Pantastico	15/34, 185 yards, 3 INT
Northeastern State	Rushing	Derrick Moore	16 rushes, 50 yards
Northeastern State	Receiving	Garrett Powell	4 receptions, 65 yards
Missouri Western	Passing	Skyler Windmiller	7/17, 64 yards
Missouri Western	Rushing	Raphael Spencer	19 rushes, 101 yards, 2 TD
Missouri Western	Receiving	Stephon Weaver	2 receptions, 34 yards

=== Emporia State ===
	1	2	3	4	OT	2OT	Total
Hornets	0	14	7	7	7	7	42
RiverHawks	7	0	0	21	7	0	35

Statistics	ESU	NESU
First downs	21	30
Total yards	388	504
Rushing yards	96	135
Passing yards	292	369
Turnovers	1	1
Time of possession	24:53	35:07

Team	Category	Player	Statistics
Emporia State	Passing	Brent Wilson	20/36, 292 yards, 4 TD, INT
Emporia State	Rushing	Antonio Brown	18 rushes, 77 yards, TD
Emporia State	Receiving	Mitchell Foote	5 receptions, 93 yards
Northeastern State	Passing	Kevin Pantastico	34/57, 369 yards, 2 TD, INT
Northeastern State	Rushing	Terrance Dixon	12 rushes, 58 yards, 2 TD
Northeastern State	Receiving	Garrett Powell	14 receptions, 179 yards, TD

=== At No. 1 NW Missouri State ===
	1	2	3	4	Total
RiverHawks	0	7	0	0	7
No. 1 Bearcats	7	7	21	14	49

Statistics	NESU	NWMSU
First downs	8	23
Total yards	147	409
Rushing yards	19	159
Passing yards	128	250
Turnovers	3	0
Time of possession	26:42	33:18

Team	Category	Player	Statistics
Northeastern State	Passing	Kevin Pantastico	9/27, 83 yards
Northeastern State	Rushing	Joel Rockmore	11 rushes, 14 yards
Northeastern State	Receiving	Peter Udoumoh	1 reception, 45 yards, TD
NW Missouri State	Passing	Brady Bolles	19/35, 246 yards, 4 TD
NW Missouri State	Rushing	Robert Burton	14 rushes, 55 yards, TD
NW Missouri State	Receiving	Alex Visk	2 receptions, 62 yards, TD

=== Nebraska–Kearney ===
	1	2	3	4	Total
Lopers	14	7	13	0	34
RiverHawks	0	0	0	7	7

Statistics	UNK	NESU
First downs	18	15
Total yards	487	264
Rushing yards	382	105
Passing yards	105	159
Turnovers	2	2
Time of possession	30:33	29:27

Team	Category	Player	Statistics
Nebraska–Kearney	Passing	Bronson Marsh	9/18, 105 yards, INT
Nebraska–Kearney	Rushing	Bronson Marsh	21 rushes, 242 yards, 4 TD
Nebraska–Kearney	Receiving	Omar Rodriguez	3 receptions, 41 yards
Northeastern State	Passing	Kevin Pantastico	19/30, 159 yards, 2 INT
Northeastern State	Rushing	Derrick Moore	2 rushes, 75 yards, TD
Northeastern State	Receiving	Garrett Powell	4 receptions, 51 yards

=== At Missouri Southern ===
	1	2	3	4	Total
RiverHawks	7	0	0	0	7
Lions	0	7	14	13	34

Statistics	NESU	MSSU
First downs	16	13
Total yards	294	401
Rushing yards	101	346
Passing yards	193	55
Turnovers	2	2
Time of possession	34:09	25:51

Team	Category	Player	Statistics
Northeastern State	Passing	Kevin Pantastico	15/30, 184 yards, TD, INT
Northeastern State	Rushing	Derrick Moore	16 rushes, 83 yards
Northeastern State	Receiving	Garrett Powell	5 receptions, 61 yards, TD
Missouri Southern	Passing	Scott Lathrop	2/4, 55 yards, TD
Missouri Southern	Rushing	Giresse Forchu	17 rushes, 134 yards, TD
Missouri Southern	Receiving	Donnell Chapman	1 reception, 35 yards

=== Central Missouri ===
	1	2	3	4	Total
Mules	14	7	14	21	56
RiverHawks	0	7	7	0	14

Statistics	UCM	NESU
First downs	26	15
Total yards	649	276
Rushing yards	405	54
Passing yards	244	222
Turnovers	1	1
Time of possession	25:37	32:23

Team	Category	Player	Statistics
Central Missouri	Passing	Hayden Hawk	15/26, 244 yards, 2 TD
Central Missouri	Rushing	LaVance Taylor	19 rushes, 175 yards, TD
Central Missouri	Receiving	Kyle Echols	2 receptions, 72 yards
Northeastern State	Passing	Kevin Pantastico	16/28, 189 yards, TD
Northeastern State	Rushing	Joel Rockmore	13 rushes, 53 yards, TD
Northeastern State	Receiving	Garrett Powell	7 receptions, 85 yards, TD

=== At Central Oklahoma ===
	1	2	3	4	Total
RiverHawks	3	0	7	0	10
Bronchos	7	14	7	0	28

Statistics	NESU	UCO
First downs	15	23
Total yards	275	378
Rushing yards	95	110
Passing yards	180	268
Turnovers	1	0
Time of possession	30:28	29:32

Team	Category	Player	Statistics
Northeastern State	Passing	Kevin Pantastico	14/31, 180 yards, TD, INT
Northeastern State	Rushing	Joel Rockmore	15 rushes, 74 yards
Northeastern State	Receiving	Garrett Powell	6 receptions, 98 yards, TD
Central Oklahoma	Passing	Chase Stallard	24/32, 268 yards, TD
Central Oklahoma	Rushing	Jake Gandara	13 rushes, 59 yards, TD
Central Oklahoma	Receiving	Connor Pulley	3 receptions, 70 yards

=== At Washburn ===
	1	2	3	4	Total
RiverHawks	0	7	0	0	7
Ichabods	8	13	14	7	42

Statistics	NESU	WASH
First downs	10	13
Total yards	210	245
Rushing yards	72	148
Passing yards	138	97
Turnovers	4	1
Time of possession	32:44	27:16

Team	Category	Player	Statistics
Northeastern State	Passing	Kevin Pantastico	12/30, 138 yards, INT
Northeastern State	Rushing	Prince McJunkins	1 rush, 35 yards
Northeastern State	Receiving	Ricki Herod	6 receptions, 48 yards
Washburn	Passing	Zeke Palmer	11/24, 79 yards
Washburn	Rushing	Vershon Moore	20 rushes, 122 yards, 2 TD
Washburn	Receiving	Connor Crimmins	2 receptions, 32 yards, TD

=== Lindenwood ===
	1	2	3	4	Total
Lions	0	7	14	14	35
RiverHawks	0	7	9	0	16

Statistics	LWU	NESU
First downs	22	18
Total yards	454	274
Rushing yards	269	24
Passing yards	185	250
Turnovers	1	1
Time of possession	30:44	29:16

Team	Category	Player	Statistics
Lindenwood	Passing	Graham Lindman	20/28, 185 yards, TD, INT
Lindenwood	Rushing	Connor Harris	11 rushes, 188 yards, 4 TD
Lindenwood	Receiving	Greg Coble	3 receptions, 71 yards
Northeastern State	Passing	Kevin Pantastico	23/43, 250 yards, TD, INT
Northeastern State	Rushing	Terrance Dixon	9 rushes, 20 yards
Northeastern State	Receiving	Prince McJunkins	4 receptions, 93 yards, TD
