= 2014 Emporia State Hornets football team =

American college football season

2014 Emporia State Hornets football
- Conference: Mid-America Intercollegiate Athletics Association
- Record: 4–7 (4–7 MIAA)
- Head coach: Garin Higgins (8th season)
- Offensive coordinator: Matt Walter (6th season)
- Defensive coordinator: Mike LoPorto (7th season)
- Co-defensive coordinator: Bryan Nardo (3rd season)
- Captains: Brent Wilson; Danny Goodman; Jordan Tice; Austin Willis
- Home stadium: Francis G. Welch Stadium

2014 Mid-America Intercollegiate Athletics Association football standings
	Conf.			Overall
Team	W		L	W		L
No. 7 Pittsburg State +^	10	–	1	11	–	2
No. 14 NW Missouri State +^	10	–	1	10	–	2
Central Oklahoma #	8	–	3	8	–	4
Central Missouri #	7	–	4	8	–	4
Fort Hays State	7	–	4	7	–	4
Missouri Western	7	–	4	7	–	4
Emporia State	4	–	7	4	–	7
Missouri Southern	4	–	7	4	–	7
Washburn	4	–	7	4	–	7
Nebraska–Kearney	3	–	8	3	–	8
Lindenwood	2	–	9	2	–	9
Northeastern State	0	–	11	0	–	11
$ – Conference champion; ^ – NCAA Division II playoff participant; # – bowl game participant (Central Oklahoma: Mineral Water Bowl, Central Missouri: Live United Texarkana Bowl); Rankings from AFCA poll

The 2014 Emporia State Hornets football team represented Emporia State University as a member of the Mid-America Intercollegiate Athletics Association during the 2014 NCAA Division II football season. Led by eight-year head coach Garin Higgins, the Hornets compiled an overall record of 4–7 with all games played against conference opponents, placing in a three-way tie for seventh in the MIAA. Emporia State played home games at Francis G. Welch Stadium in Emporia, Kansas.

== Schedule ==
Date	Time	Opponent	Rank	Site	TV	Result	Attendance
September 4	7:00 p.m.	Missouri Southern	No. 22	Francis G. Welch Stadium; Emporia, KS		W 53–28	6,045
September 11	7:00 p.m.	at Central Missouri	No. 19	Audrey J. Walton Stadium; Warrensburg, MO		L 31–50	7,986
September 20	2:00 p.m.	Central Oklahoma		Francis G. Welch Stadium; Emporia, KS		L 14–24	5,463
September 27	6:00 p.m.	at Northeastern State		Doc Wadley Stadium; Tahlequah, OK		W 42–35 ^{2OT}	2,017
October 4	2:00 p.m.	Lindenwood		Francis G. Welch Stadium; Emporia, KS		W 37–22	5,019
October 11	2:00 p.m.	at Pittsburg State		Carnie Smith Stadium; Pittsburg, KS		L 17–47	10,845
October 18	2:00 p.m.	Fort Hays State^{†}		Francis G. Welch Stadium; Emporia, KS		L 21–24	5,004
October 25	2:07 p.m.	at Missouri Western		Spratt Stadium; St. Joseph, MO	MIAA Network	W 30–10	5,099
November 1	1:00 p.m.	at Washburn		Yager Stadium at Moore Bowl; Topeka, KS (rivalry)		L 10–36	4,163
November 8	2:07 p.m.	Northwest Missouri State		Francis G. Welch Stadium; Emporia, KS	MIAA Network	L 14–42	3,522
November 15	1:00 p.m.	at Nebraska–Kearney		Ron & Carol Cope Stadium; Kearney, NE		L 40–42	1,200
^{†}Homecoming; Rankings from AFCA Poll released prior to the game; All times are in Central time

== Preseason outlook ==
Sporting News released their Top-25 on June 10, 2014. The Hornets were placed #22. Two days later the Lindy's NCAA Division II Preseason Top 25 was released, where the Hornets were placed at #13, nine spots higher than the Sporting News ranking.

The conference rankings were released on August 5. Emporia State was ranked 4th in the Coaches Poll and 3rd in the Media Poll.

On August 18, the AFCA poll was released. Emporia State was ranked at #22. Two other MIAA teams were ranked as well; Northwest Missouri State at #1 and Pittsburg State at #9.

On August 26, D2football.com released their Top 25 poll. Emporia State was chosen at #19, which is three ranks higher than the AFCA the Sporting News polls. Four other MIAA schools were ranked in the D2football.com poll; Northwest Missouri State at #1, Pittsburg State at #9, and Missouri Western at #24.

== Game summaries ==
=== Missouri Southern ===
Missouri Southern at Emporia State

Team	1	2	3	4	Total
Missouri Southern	0	13	8	7	28
• #22 Emporia State	0	29	10	14	53

- Date: September 4
- Location: Francis G. Welch Stadium, Emporia, KS
- Game start: 7:00 p.m. CDT
- Elapsed time: 3:08
- Game attendance: 6,045
- Game weather: Clear, 91 °F (33 °C), Wind S at 18 mph (29 km/h)
- Referee: Craig Hesler

This was the first meeting in football between the two schools since 2011. The last time ESU played MSSU, they won 31–24 after coming out of a 17–0 deficit at half.

In the first quarter, neither team scored, but in the second, Missouri Southern was the first to score a touchdown. MSSU had a total of 212 rushing yards compared to Emporia State's 273, and MSSU had 188 passing yards compared to ESU's 244.

=== Central Missouri ===
Emporia State at Central Missouri

Team	1	2	3	4	Total
#19 Emporia State	14	7	7	3	31
• Central Missouri	14	7	15	14	50

- Date: September 11
- Location: Audrey J. Walton Stadium, Warrensburg, MO
- Game start: 7:00 p.m. CDT
- Elapsed time: 3:12
- Game attendance: 7,986
- Game weather: Overcast, 54 °F (12 °C), Wind N at 6 mph (9.7 km/h)
- Referee: Danny Harris

Like the previous game last week, this was the first meeting for ESU and UCM since 2010.

=== Central Oklahoma ===
Central Oklahoma at Emporia State

Team	1	2	3	4	Total
• Central Oklahoma	7	10	0	7	24
Emporia State	7	0	0	7	14

- Date: September 20
- Location: Welch Stadium, Emporia, KS
- Game start: 2:00 p.m. CDT
- Elapsed time: 2:54
- Game attendance: 5,463
- Game weather: Sunny, 86 °F (30 °C), Wind SW at 10 mph (16 km/h)
- Referee: John Adams

=== Northeastern State ===
Emporia State at Northeastern State

Team	1	2	3	4	OT	2OT	Total
• Emporia State	0	14	7	7	7	7	42
Northeastern State	7	0	0	21	7	0	35

- Date: September 27
- Location: Doc Wadley Stadium, Tahlequah, OK
- Game start: 6:00 p.m. CDT
- Game attendance: 2017
- Game weather: Sunny and Clear, 82 °F (28 °C), Wind SSE at 7 mph (11 km/h)
- Referee: Sean Johnston

=== Lindenwood ===
Lindenwood at Emporia State

Team	1	2	3	4	Total
Lindenwood	0	0	8	14	22
• Emporia State	3	13	14	7	37

- Date: October 4
- Location: Welch Stadium, Emporia, KS
- Game start: 2:00 p.m. CDT
- Elapsed time: 2:54
- Game attendance: 5,019
- Game weather: Sunny, 60 °F (16 °C), Wind NNW at 10 mph (16 km/h)
- Referee: Danny Harris

=== Pittsburg State ===
Emporia State at Pittsburg State

Team	1	2	3	4	Total
Emporia State	10	0	7	0	17
• Pittsburg State	0	24	14	7	45

- Date: October 11
- Location: Carnie Smith Stadium, Pittsburg, KS
- Game start: 2:00 p.m. CDT
- Elapsed time: 2:51
- Game attendance: 10,845
- Game weather: Overcast, 55 °F (13 °C), Wind N at 7 mph (11 km/h)
- Referee: Dwight Neibling

=== Fort Hays State ===
Fort Hays State at Emporia State

Team	1	2	3	4	Total
• Fort Hays State	21	0	0	3	24
Emporia State	0	0	10	11	21

- Date: October 18
- Location: Welch Stadium, Emporia, KS
- Game start: 2:00 p.m. CDT
- Elapsed time: 2:57
- Game attendance: 5,004
- Game weather: 61 °F (16 °C), Wind NNE at 5–10 mph (8.0–16.1 km/h)
- Referee: Richard Dixon

=== Missouri Western ===
Emporia State at Missouri Western

Team	1	2	3	4	Total
• Emporia State	0	10	10	10	30
Missouri Western	0	3	7	0	10

- Date: October 25
- Location: Spratt Stadium, St. Joseph, MO
- Game start: 2:07 p.m. CDT
- Elapsed time: 3:15
- Game attendance: 5,099
- Game weather: Sunny, 75 °F (24 °C), Wind 0–5 mph (0.0–8.0 km/h)mph
- Referee: Chris Tallent

=== Washburn ===
Emporia State at Washburn

Team	1	2	3	4	Total
Emporia State	0	0	10	0	10
• Washburn	13	10	0	13	36

- Date: November 1
- Location: Yager Stadium at Moore Bowl, Topeka, KS
- Game start: 1:00 p.m. CDT
- Elapsed time: 2:54
- Game attendance: 4,163
- Game weather: Sunny and clear, 45 °F (7 °C), Wind N 15–20 mph (24–32 km/h)mph
- Referee: Richard Dixon

=== Northwest Missouri State ===
Northwest Missouri State at Emporia State

Team	1	2	3	4	Total
• Northwest Missouri State	14	21	7	0	42
Emporia State	0	0	14	0	14

- Date: November 8
- Location: Welch Stadium, Emporia, KS
- Game start: 2:07 p.m. CST
- Elapsed time: 3:01
- Game attendance: 3,522
- Game weather: Sunny, 52 °F (11 °C), Wind NNW 15–20 mph (24–32 km/h)mph
- Referee: Craig Helser

=== Nebraska–Kearney ===
Emporia State at Nebraska-Kearney

Team	1	2	3	4	Total
Emporia State	7	7	7	19	40
• Nebraska–Kearney	14	28	0	0	42

- Date: November 15
- Location: Ron & Carol Cope Stadium, Kearney, NE
- Game start: 1:00 p.m. CST
- Elapsed time: 3:00
- Game attendance: 1,200
- Game weather: Snowing & cold, 25 °F (−4 °C), Wind 10–25 mph (16–40 km/h)mph
- Referee: John Adam

== Personnel ==
=== Coaching staff ===
Along with Higgins, there are 7 assistants.

Name	Position	Seasons at Emporia State	Alma Mater
Garin Higgins	Head coach	8	Emporia State (1992)
Matt Walter	Offensive coordinator/offensive line coach	7	Northwestern Oklahoma (2000)
Mike LoPorto	Co-defensive coordinator/defensive line coach	7	Emporia State (2007)
Bryan Nardo	Co-defensive coordinator/linebackers Coach	3	Ohio (2008)
Nathan Linsey	Defensive secondary coach	4	Emporia State (2010)
Justin Weiser	Running backs coach/strength and conditioning coach	2	Emporia State (2010)
Cory Sullivan	Graduate assistant	2	Ohio (2012)
Terrence Coleman	Inside Receivers	2	Emporia State

=== Roster ===
2014 Emporia State Hornets Football Roster
Quarterbacks: 15 Brent Wilson – Jr.; 14 Braxton Marstall – Fr.; 13 Ty Reasoner - (redshirt) Fr.; Running backs: 1 Jordan Tice – Sr.; 5 Trent Davis – Jr.; 12 Josh Matthews – Sr.; 26 Landon Nault – Fr.; 27 Antonio Brown – So.; 28 A.J. West - (redshirt) Fr.; 40 Kai Callins – Fr.; 41 Nikita Brown – Sr.; Half backs: 11 Dominique Jones – Jr.; 45 Reese Richards – So.; 46 Connor Thierolf – Jr.; 80 Trenton Ball – Fr.; 86 Nick Oliver – Fr.; Wide receivers: 6 Kavaski Ervin – Jr.; 7 Jake Smithton – Jr.; 10 Mitchell Foote – So.; 16 Dyland Walker – Jr.; 18 JP Lohrentz – So.; 19 Kory Lonberger – Sr.; 25 Austin Willis – Sr.; 81 Logan Clothier – Jr.; 82 Anthony Buffalomeat – So.; 83 Anthony Davis – So.; 84 Chris Lee – So.; 85 DeWayne Sanford – So.; 87 Jaylon Radel – Fr.; 88 Daniel Williams – Jr.; 89 Justin Brown – Fr.; Safeties: 8 Lyndell Johnson – Sr.; 43 Cameron Karn - (redshirt) Fr.; 48 Reid Buckingham – Fr.	Offensive line: 51 Eric Pruitt – Jr.; 57 Joe Pomatto – (redshirt) Fr.; 60 Gerron Anthony – Jr.; 62 Jordan Davis – Fr.; 64 Jarrett Stastny – So.; 66 Danny Goodman – Sr.; 67 Dylan Hall – (redshirt) Fr.; 68 Diesen Gorham – Fr.; 69 Jordan McAdoo – Jr.; 71 Clayton Brown – Sr.; 72 Dane Riley - (redshirt) Fr.; 74 Jake Warehime – (redshirt) Fr.; 76 Beau Jenkins – So.; 77 Aaron Blount – Sr.; 78 Braden Janzen – Fr.; 79 Kenneth Sellers – Jr.; Defensive line: 9 Eddie Vinson – So.; 47 Steele Fleming – Jr.; 56 Lear Schrader – Jr.; 61 Dameitrik Morris – Sr.; 65 Ryan Smith – Fr.; 75 Russell Hampton – Jr.; 90 Nick Vega – So.; 91 Darian Harris – Fr.; 93 Justin Wilson – Jr.; 94 Nick Shutte – Sr.; 95 Jor'Don Stephenson – So.; 98 James Junious – Jr.; 99 Reed Hartshorn – Jr.	Linebackers: 17 Tariq Allen – Sr.; 23 Deshawn Dinwiddle – Sr.; 24 Corben Abila – Jr.; 31 Remington Whitley – (redshirt) Fr.; 34 Jason Tetuan – Jr.; 38 Kole Schankie – So.; 44 Jordan Robinson – So.; 50 Brandon Goodman – So.; 53 Jeramie Fischer – (redshirt) Fr.; 55 Gabe Cleveland – (redshirt) Fr.; Defensive backs: 2 Brandon Gentz – Jr.; 3 Ace Mayze – So.; 4 Ty Zimmerman – (redshirt) Fr.; 20 Jarett Strode – Jr.; 21 Kadeem Satchell – Sr.; 22 Deveon Dinwiddie – Sr.; 29 Curtis Shorts – So.; 30 Orlando Sheets – Fr.; 32 Marcus Houghton - (redshirt) Fr.; 33 Josh Montegudo – So.; 35 Elliot Montgomery - (redshirt) Fr.; 36 Samuel Saidi – Sr.; 37 Cole Combs - (redshirt) Fr.; 39 Marcus Hicks - (redshirt) Fr.; 42 Trey Dickerson – So.; 52 Donovan Walker - (redshirt) Fr.; 54 Logan Powell – Fr.; 63 Parker Bass – Fr.; 97 Brandon Allen – Jr.; Kickers: 49 Justin Marcha – Fr.; 89 Austin Morton – (redshirt) Fr.; 96 Dakota Weaver – (redshirt) Fr.; Source:
