= 2014 Mid-America Intercollegiate Athletics Association football season =

- League: NCAA Division II
- Sport: football
- Duration: September 4, 2014 – November 15, 2014
- Teams: 12
- TV partner: KSMO-TV (MIAA Network)

2014
- Conference Champion: NW Missouri State, Pittsburg State
- Runners-up: Central Oklahoma

Football seasons
- ← 2013 2015 →

2014 Mid-America Intercollegiate Athletics Association football standings
	Conf.			Overall
Team	W		L	W		L
No. 7 Pittsburg State +^	10	–	1	11	–	2
No. 14 NW Missouri State +^	10	–	1	10	–	2
Central Oklahoma #	8	–	3	8	–	4
Central Missouri #	7	–	4	8	–	4
Fort Hays State	7	–	4	7	–	4
Missouri Western	7	–	4	7	–	4
Emporia State	4	–	7	4	–	7
Missouri Southern	4	–	7	4	–	7
Washburn	4	–	7	4	–	7
Nebraska–Kearney	3	–	8	3	–	8
Lindenwood	2	–	9	2	–	9
Northeastern State	0	–	11	0	–	11
$ – Conference champion; ^ – NCAA Division II playoff participant; # – bowl game participant (Central Oklahoma: Mineral Water Bowl, Central Missouri: Live United Texarkana Bowl); Rankings from AFCA poll

The 2014 Mid-America Intercollegiate Athletics Association football season was made up of 12 United States college athletic programs that compete in the Mid-America Intercollegiate Athletics Association (MIAA) under the National Collegiate Athletic Association (NCAA) for the 2014 college football season. The season began play on August 31, 2014, and ended November 16, 2014.

== Conference teams and information ==
Starting with the 2014 football season, the Lincoln Blue Tigers joined the Great Lakes Valley Conference as a football–only member, as well as the Southwest Baptist Bearcats. It was part of a "Strategic Conference Football Scheduling Alliance" between the MIAA and GLVC.

School	Nickname	Location	Stadium
Central Missouri	Mules	Warrensburg, Missouri	Audrey J. Walton Stadium
Central Oklahoma	Bronchos	Edmond, Oklahoma	Wantland Stadium
Emporia State	Hornets	Emporia, Kansas	Francis G. Welch Stadium
Fort Hays	Tigers	Hays, Kansas	Lewis Field
Lindenwood	Lions	St. Charles, Missouri	Hunter Stadium
Missouri Southern	Lions	Joplin, Missouri	Fred G. Hughes Stadium
Missouri Western	Griffons	St. Joseph, Missouri	Spratt Stadium
Nebraska–Kearney	Lopers	Kearney, Nebraska	Ron & Carol Cope Stadium
Northeastern State	Riverhawks	Tahlequah, Oklahoma	Doc Wadley Stadium
Northwest Missouri	Bearcats	Maryville, Missouri	Bearcat Stadium
Pittsburg State	Gorillas	Pittsburg, Kansas	Carnie Smith Stadium
Washburn	Ichabods	Topeka, Kansas	Yager Stadium at Moore Bowl

=== Coaches ===
Please note that the information listed is the information before the season started.

Team	Head coach	Years at school	Overall record	Record at school
Central Missouri	Jim Svoboda	5	83–34	31–15
Central Oklahoma	Nick Bobeck	3	46–21	4–16
Emporia State	Garin Higgins	8	89–49	38–40
Fort Hays State	Chris Brown	4	13–18	13–18
Lindenwood	Patrick Ross	11	99–39	85–35
Missouri Southern	Daryl Daye	3	30–46	13–8
Missouri Western	Jerry Partridge	18	132–67	100–52
Nebraska–Kearney	Darrell Morris	14	98–55	5–14
Northeastern State	Rob Robinson	1	0–0	0–0
NW Missouri State	Adam Dorrel	4	37–6	24–4
Pittsburg State	Tim Beck	5	36–12	36–12
Washburn	Craig Schurig	12	87–51	87–51

== Preseason outlook ==
Sporting News released their Top-25 on June 10, 2014. Three teams from the conference were ranked in the top 25: #1 Northwest Missouri, #14 Pittsburg State, and #22 Emporia State. Two days later the Lindy's NCAA Division II Preseason Top 25 was released, where four teams placed in the top 25 from the conference: #1 Northwest Missouri, #6 Pittsburg State, #13 Emporia State, and #24 Missouri Western.

On August 5, MIAA Media Days was held in Kansas City. Northwest Missouri was chosen as #1 for both Coaches and Media polls. The schools were ranked as follows:

Coaches Poll

1. Northwest Missouri
2. Pittsburg State
3. Central Missouri
4. Emporia State
5. Missouri Western
6. Washburn
7. Missouri Southern
8. Fort Hays State
9. Lindenwood
10. Central Oklahoma
11. Nebraska–Kearney
12. Northeastern State

Media Poll

1. Northwest Missouri
2. Pittsburg State
3. Emporia State
4. Missouri Western
5. Washburn
6. Central Missouri
7. Missouri Southern
8. Fort Hays State
9. Lindenwood
10. Nebraska–Kearney
11. Central Oklahoma
12. Northeastern State

On August 18, the National Collegiate Athletic Association released the AFCA Coaches poll was released. The three MIAA teams that are ranked are: Northwest Missouri at #1, Pittsburg State at #9, and Emporia State tied at #22. Others that received votes were: Central Missouri with 82 votes, Missouri Western with 38, and Washburn with 2.

On August 26, D2football.com released their Top 25 poll. Four other MIAA schools were ranked in the D2football.com poll; Northwest Missouri State at #1, Pittsburg State at #9, Emporia State was chosen at #19 and Missouri Western at #24.

== Schedule ==
The first week of conference play began on Thursday, September 4, 2014. The schedule is subject to change.

=== Week 1 ===
Date	Time	Visiting team	Home team	Site	TV	Result	Attendance	Ref.
September 4, 2014	7:00 pm	Central Missouri	Missouri Western	Spratt Stadium • St. Joseph, MO		MWSU 10–9	5,105	
September 4, 2014	7:00 pm	Central Oklahoma	Fort Hays State	Lewis Field • Hays, KS		UCO 26–7	4,133	
September 4, 2014	7:00 pm	Missouri Southern	No. 22 Emporia State	Welch Stadium • Emporia, KS		ESU 53–28	6,045	
September 4, 2014	6:00 pm	Lindenwood	Washburn	Yager Stadium • Topeka, KS		LWU 44–38	6,217	
September 4, 2014	7:00 pm	Nebraska–Kearney	No. 1 Northwest Missouri	Bearcat Stadium • Maryville, MO	MIAA Network	NWMSU 31–7	7,878	
September 6, 2014	7:00 pm	Northeastern State	No. 9 Pittsburg State	Carnie Smith Stadium • Pittsburg, KS		PSU 37–0	10,814	
^{#}Rankings from AFCA Poll. All times are in Central Time.

=== Week 2 ===
Date	Time	Visiting team	Home team	Site	TV	Result	Attendance	Ref.
September 11, 2014	7:00 pm	No. 19 Emporia State	Central Missouri	Walton Stadium • Warrensburg, MO		UCM 50–31	7,986	
September 11, 2014	6:00 pm	No. 8 Pittsburg State	Lindenwood	Hunter Stadium • St. Charles, MO		PSU 38–7	3,105	
September 11, 2014	6:30 pm	No. 1 Northwest Missouri	Missouri Southern	Hughes Stadium • Joplin, MO		NWMSU 40–14	6,247	
September 11, 2014	7:00 pm	Washburn	Nebraska–Kearney	Cope Stadium • Kearney, NE		WU 10–7	3,207	
September 13, 2014	6:00 pm	Missouri Western	Central Oklahoma	Wantland Stadium • Edmond, OK		UCO 26–17	4,512	
September 13, 2014	2:07 pm	Fort Hays State	Northeastern State	Doc Wadley Stadium • Tahlequah, OK	MIAA Network	FHSU 48–13	2,189	
^{#}Rankings from AFCA Poll. All times are in Central Time.

=== Week 3 ===
Date	Time	Visiting team	Home team	Site	TV	Result	Attendance	Ref.
September 20, 2014	1:00 pm	Central Missouri	No. 1 Northwest Missouri	Bearcat Stadium • Maryville, MO		NWMSU 37–15	9,068	
September 20, 2014	2:00 pm	Central Oklahoma	Emporia State	Welch Stadium • Emporia, KS		UCO 24–14	5,463	
September 20, 2014	7:00 pm	Lindenwood	Fort Hays State	Lewis Field • Hays, KS		FHSU 20–7	3,928	
September 20, 2014	3:00 pm	Missouri Southern	Nebraska–Kearney	Cope Stadium • Kearney, NE		MSSU 34–17	4,515	
September 20, 2014	6:00 pm	Northeastern State	Missouri Western	Spratt Stadium • St. Joseph, MO		MWSU 30–0	4,991	
September 20, 2014	2:07 pm	No. 8 Pittsburg State	Washburn	Yager Stadium • Topeka, KS	MIAA Network	PSU 42–0	5,682	
^{#}Rankings from AFCA Poll. All times are in Central Time.

=== Week 4 ===
Date	Time	Visiting team	Home team	Site	TV	Result	Attendance	Ref.
September 25, 2014	7:00 pm	Missouri Western	Lindenwood	Hunter Stadium • St. Charles, MO	CBS Sports Network	MWSU 26–9	3,857	
September 27, 2014	1:30 pm	Nebraska–Kearney	Central Missouri	Walton Stadium • Warrensburg, MO		UCM 45–28	8,986	
September 27, 2014	1:00 pm	Northwest Missouri	Central Oklahoma	Wantland Stadium • Edmond, OK		NWMSU 36–13	4,518	
September 27, 2014	6:00 pm	Emporia State	Northeastern State	Doc Wadley Stadium • Tahlequah, OK		ESU 42–35 ^{2OT}	2,017	
September 27, 2014	2:07 pm	Fort Hays State	Pittsburg State	Carnie Smith Stadium • Pittsburg, KS	MIAA Network	FHSU 7–6	11,489	
September 27, 2014	6:30 pm	Washburn	Missouri Southern	Hughes Stadium • Joplin, MO		MSSU 42–21	5,274	
^{#}Rankings from AFCA Poll. All times are in Central Time.

=== Week 5 ===
Date	Time	Visiting team	Home team	Site	TV	Result	Attendance	Ref.
October 4, 2014	2:00 pm	Central Missouri	Missouri Southern	Hughes Stadium • Joplin, MO		UCM 34–31 ^{OT}	5,267	
October 4, 2014	2:07 pm	Central Oklahoma	Nebraska–Kearney	Cope Stadium • Kearney, NE	MIAA Network	UCO 49–0	4,500	
October 4, 2014	2:00 pm	Lindenwood	Emporia State	Welch Stadium • Emporia, KS		ESU 37–22	5,019	
October 4, 2014	1:00 pm	Fort Hays State	Washburn	Yager Stadium • Topeka, KS		WU 27–24 ^{OT}	4,929	
October 4, 2014	6:00 pm	Pittsburg State	Missouri Western	Spratt Stadium • St. Joseph, MO		PSU 23–13	3,451	
October 4, 2014	1:00 pm	Northeastern State	Northwest Missouri	Bearcat Stadium • Maryville, MO		NWMSU 49–7	6,574	
^{#}Rankings from AFCA Poll. All times are in Central Time.

=== Week 6 ===
Date	Time	Visiting team	Home team	Site	TV	Result	Attendance	Ref.
October 11, 2014	1:30 pm	Washburn	Central Missouri	Walton Stadium • Warrensburg, MO		UCM 44–0	6,177	
October 11, 2014	2:07 pm	Missouri Southern	Central Oklahoma	Wantland Stadium • Edmond, OK	MIAA Network	UCO 43–41 ^{3 OT}	2,368	
October 11, 2014	2:00 pm	Emporia State	Pittsburg State	Carnie Smith Stadium • Pittsburg, KS		PSU 45–17	10,845	
October 11, 2014	7:00 pm	Missouri Western	Fort Hays State	Lewis Field • Hays, KS		MWSU 26–7	5,076	
October 11, 2014	1:30 pm	Northwest Missouri	Lindenwood	Hunter Stadium • St. Charles, MO		NWMSU 51–20	3,007	
October 11, 2014	1:00 pm	Nebraska–Kearney	Northeastern State	Doc Wadley Stadium • Tahlequah, OK		UNK 34–7	1,026	
^{#}Rankings from AFCA Poll. All times are in Central Time.

=== Week 7 ===
Date	Time	Visiting team	Home team	Site	TV	Result	Attendance	Ref.
October 18, 2014	1:30 pm	Central Oklahoma	Central Missouri	Walton Stadium • Warrensburg, MO		UCM 31–19	9,783	
October 18, 2014	2:00 pm	Fort Hays State	Emporia State	Welch Stadium • Emporia, KS		FHSU 24–21	5,004	
October 18, 2014	1:00 pm	Lindenwood	Nebraska–Kearney	Cope Stadium • Kearney, NE		UNK 31–13	3,200	
October 18, 2014	2:07 pm	Northeastern State	Missouri Southern	Hughes Stadium • Joplin, MO	MIAA Network	MSSU 34–7	5,517	
October 18, 2014	1:00 pm	Missouri Western	Washburn	Yager Stadium • Topeka, KS		MWSU 40–14	4,872	
October 4, 2014	2:00 pm	Pittsburg State	Northwest Missouri	Bearcat Stadium • Maryville, MO		PSU 35–17	11,002	
^{#}Rankings from AFCA Poll. All times are in Central Time.

=== Week 8 ===
Date	Time	Visiting team	Home team	Site	TV	Result	Attendance	Ref.
October 25, 2014	1:00 pm	Central Missouri	Northeastern State	Doc Wadley Stadium • Tahlequah, OK		UCM 56–14	2,102	
October 25, 2014	1:00 pm	Washburn	Central Oklahoma	Wantland Stadium • Edmond, OK		UCO 35–26	2,112	
October 25, 2014	2:07 pm	Emporia State	Missouri Western	Spratt Stadium • St. Joseph, MO	MIAA Network	ESU 30–10	5,099	
October 25, 2014	2:00 pm	Northwest Missouri	Fort Hays State	Lewis Field • Hays, KS		NWMSU 29–10	2,932	
October 25, 2014	1:30 pm	Missouri Southern	Lindenwood	Hunter Stadium • St. Charles, MO		MSSU 31–17	1,621	
October 25, 2014	2:00 pm	Nebraska–Kearney	Pittsburg State	Carnie Smith Stadium • Pittsburg, KS		PSU 36–21	8,417	
^{#}Rankings from AFCA Poll. All times are in Central Time.

=== Week 9 ===
Date	Time	Visiting team	Home team	Site	TV	Result	Attendance	Ref.
November 1, 2014	2:07 pm	Lindenwood	Central Missouri	Walton Stadium • Warrensburg, MO	MIAA Network	UCM 48–28	4,378	
November 1, 2014	2:00 pm	Northeastern State	Central Oklahoma	Wantland Stadium • Edmond, OK (President's Cup)		UCO 28–10	6,128	
November 1, 2014	1:00 pm	Emporia State	Washburn	Yager Stadium • Topeka, KS (Turnpike Tussle)		WU 36–10	4,163	
November 1, 2014	12:00p	Fort Hays State	Nebraska–Kearney	Cope Stadium • Kearney, NE		FHSU 24–17	2,811	
November 1, 2014	7:00 pm	Pittsburg State	Missouri Southern	Hughes Stadium • Joplin, MO		PSU 41–10	6,978	
November 1, 2014	1:00 pm	Missouri Western	Northwest Missouri	Bearcat Stadium • Maryville, MO		NWMSU 41–3	7,182	
^{#}Rankings from AFCA Poll. All times are in Central Time.

=== Week 10 ===
Date	Time	Visiting team	Home team	Site	TV	Result	Attendance	Ref.
November 8, 2014	2:00 pm	Central Missouri	Pittsburg State	Carnie Smith Stadium • Pittsburg, KS		PSU 38–31	10,043	
November 8, 2014	1:30 pm	Central Oklahoma	Lindenwood	Hunter Stadium • St. Charles, MO		UCO 45–13	1,332	
November 8, 2014	2:07 pm	Northwest Missouri	Emporia State	Welch Stadium • Emporia, KS	MIAA Network	NWMSU 42–14	3,522	
November 8, 2014	2:00 pm	Missouri Southern	Fort Hays State	Lewis Field • Hays, KS		FHSU 49–41	3,234	
November 8, 2014	1:30 pm	Nebraska–Kearney	Missouri Western	Spratt Stadium • St. Joseph, MO		MWSU 55–0	2,120	
November 8, 2014	1:00 pm	Northeastern State	Washburn	Yager Stadium • Topeka, KS		WU 42–7	3,812	
^{#}Rankings from AFCA Poll. All times are in Central Time.

=== Week 11 ===
Date	Time	Visiting team	Home team	Site	TV	Result	Attendance	Ref.
November 15, 2014	1:30 pm	Fort Hays State	Central Missouri	Walton Stadium • Warrensburg, MO		FHSU 45–17	2,134	
November 15, 2014	1:00 pm	Pittsburg State	Central Oklahoma	Wantland Stadium • Edmond, OK	MIAA Network	PSU 41–14	3,956	
November 15, 2014	1:00 pm	Emporia State	Nebraska–Kearney	Cope Stadium • Kearney, NE		UNK 42–40	1,200	
November 15, 2014	1:00 pm	Lindenwood	Northeastern State	Doc Wadley Stadium • Tahlequah, OK		LWU 35–16	1,137	
November 15, 2014	1:00 pm	Missouri Western	Missouri Southern	Hughes Stadium • Joplin, MO		MWSU 22–21	1,011	
November 8, 2014	1:00 pm	Northwest Missouri	Washburn	Bearcat Stadium • Maryville, MO		NWMSU 31–14	3,136	
^{#}Rankings from AFCA Poll. All times are in Central Time.

== Home game attendance ==
Team	Stadium	Capacity	Game 1	Game 2	Game 3	Game 4	Game 5	Game 6	Total	Average	% of Capacity
Central Missouri	Audrey J. Walton Stadium	10,000	7,986	8,986	6,177	9,783	4,378	2,134	39,444	6,574	65.74%
Central Oklahoma	Wantland Stadium	10,000	4,512	4,518	2,368	2,112	6,128	3,956	23,594	3,932	39.32%
Emporia State	Francis G. Welch Stadium	7,000	6,045	5,463	5,019	5,004	3,522	—	25,053	5,011	71.59%
Fort Hays State	Lewis Field Stadium	6,362	4,133	3,928	5,076	2,932	3,234	—	19,303	3,861	60.69%
Lindenwood	Harlen C. Hunter Stadium	7,450	3,105	3,857	3,007	1,621	1,332	—	12,922	2,584	34.68%
Missouri Southern	Fred G. Hughes Stadium	7,000	6,247	5,274	5,267	5,517	6,978	1,011	30,294	5,049	72.13%
Missouri Western	Spratt Stadium	7,500	5,105	4,991	3,451	5,099	2,120	—	20,766	4,153	55.37%
Nebraska–Kearney	Cope Stadium	5,250	3,207	4,515	4,500	3,200	2,811	1,200	19,433	3,239	61.70%
Northeastern State	Doc Wadley Stadium	8,300	2,189	2,017	1,026	2,102	1,137	—	8,471	1,694	20.41%
Northwest Missouri State	Bearcat Stadium	6,500	7,878	9,068	6,574	11,002	7,182	3,136	44,850	7,473	114.97%
Pittsburg State	Carnie Smith Stadium	8,343	10,814	11,489	10,845	8,417	10,043	—	51,608	10,322	123.72%
Washburn	Yager Stadium	7,200	6,217	5,682	4,929	4,872	4,163	3,812	29,675	4,946	68.69%
