= Tyler Fenwick =

American football coach (born c. 1976)

Current position
- Title: Head coach
- Team: Missouri Western
- Conference: MIAA
- Record: 15–19

Biographical details
- Born: c. 1976 (age 49–50); Los Angeles, California, U.S.
- Education: University of New Mexico (1999)

Playing career
- 1995–1996: Los Angeles Valley
- 1997–1998: New Mexico
- Position: Wide receiver

Coaching career (HC unless noted)
- 1999–2000: Birmingham HS (CA) (OC)
- 2001: Occidental (WR)
- 2002–2005: Occidental (OC)
- 2006: Minnesota State–Moorhead (OC)
- 2007–2012: Missouri Western (OC)
- 2013–2018: Missouri S&T
- 2019–2022: Southeastern Oklahoma State
- 2023–present: Missouri Western

Head coaching record
- Overall: 68–67
- Bowls: 2–2

Tyler Fenwick (born c. 1976) is an American college football coach. He is the head football coach for Missouri Western State University, a position he has held since 2023. He was also the head football coach for the Missouri University of Science and Technology from 2013 to 2018 and Southeastern Oklahoma State University from 2019 to 2022. He also coached for Birmingham High School, Occidental, and Minnesota State–Moorhead. He played college football for Los Angeles Valley College and New Mexico as a wide receiver.

== Personal life ==
Fenwick's father, Jim, was the head football coach for Pierce College, Los Angeles Valley College, California State University, Northridge, and Eastern Oregon University.

== Head coaching record ==
Year	Team	Overall	Conference	Standing	Bowl/playoffs
Missouri S&T Miners (Great Lakes Valley Conference) (2013–2018)
2013	Missouri S&T	6–5	5–2	T–2nd	
2014	Missouri S&T	4–7	3–5	7th	
2015	Missouri S&T	5–5	5–3	3rd	
2016	Missouri S&T	5–6	4–4	5th	
2017	Missouri S&T	7–4	5–2	T–2nd	
2018	Missouri S&T	10–2	6–1	2nd	W Mineral Water
Missouri S&T:		37–29	28–17		
Southeastern Oklahoma State Savage Storm (Great American Conference) (2019–2022)
2019	Southeastern Oklahoma State	1–10	1–10	12th	
2020–21	No team—COVID-19				
2021	Southeastern Oklahoma State	9–3	8–3	4th	W Live United Texarkana
2022	Southeastern Oklahoma State	6–6	6–5	5th	L Live United Texarkana
Southeastern Oklahoma State:		16–19	15–18		
Missouri Western Griffons (Mid-America Intercollegiate Athletics Association) (2023–present)
2023	Missouri Western	8–4	7–3	T–3rd	L Live United Texarkana
2024	Missouri Western	4–7	2–7	T–8th	
2025	Missouri Western	3–8	2–7	T–8th	
Missouri Western:		15–19	11–17		
Total:		68–67			
