= 2014 Central Oklahoma Bronchos football team =

American college football season

2014 Central Oklahoma Bronchos football

Mineral Water Bowl, L 10–42 vs. Sioux Falls
- Conference: Mid-America Intercollegiate Athletics Association
- Record: 8–4 (8–3 MIAA)
- Head coach: Nick Bobeck
- Offensive coordinator: Chris Martin
- Defensive coordinator: Russ Pickett
- Home stadium: Wantland Stadium

2014 Mid-America Intercollegiate Athletics Association football standings
	Conf.			Overall
Team	W		L	W		L
No. 7 Pittsburg State +^	10	–	1	11	–	2
No. 14 NW Missouri State +^	10	–	1	10	–	2
Central Oklahoma #	8	–	3	8	–	4
Central Missouri #	7	–	4	8	–	4
Fort Hays State	7	–	4	7	–	4
Missouri Western	7	–	4	7	–	4
Emporia State	4	–	7	4	–	7
Missouri Southern	4	–	7	4	–	7
Washburn	4	–	7	4	–	7
Nebraska–Kearney	3	–	8	3	–	8
Lindenwood	2	–	9	2	–	9
Northeastern State	0	–	11	0	–	11
$ – Conference champion; ^ – NCAA Division II playoff participant; # – bowl game participant (Central Oklahoma: Mineral Water Bowl, Central Missouri: Live United Texarkana Bowl); Rankings from AFCA poll

The 2014 Central Oklahoma Bronchos football team represented the University of Central Oklahoma during the 2014 NCAA Division II football season, and completed the 109th season of Broncho football. The Bronchos played their six home games at Wantland Stadium in Edmond, Oklahoma, which has been Central Oklahoma's home stadium since 1965. The 2014 team came off a 2-8 record for the second season in a row. The 2014 team was headed by third year head coach Nick Bobeck. 2014 was the Bronchos 3rd as a member of the Mid-America Intercollegiate Athletics Association (MIAA). The team finished the regular season with an 8-3 record and made the program's first appearance in the Mineral Water Bowl.

== Preseason outlook ==
The conference rankings were released on August 5. In a repeat of last year's preseason rankings Central Oklahoma was ranked 10th in the Coaches Poll and 11th in the Media Poll.

== Media ==
Every Central Oklahoma game was broadcast on KNAH 99.7 F.M. for the second consecutive season.

As part of the MIAA network slate of games, the Missouri Southern State and Nebraska–Kearney games aired locally on a tape delayed basis on the Sunday night following the games. The MIAA reserved the last week of the TV schedule to be a flex game with significant importance to conference. The Bronchos game against Pittsburg State was added to the TV schedule.

== Schedule ==
Date	Time	Opponent	Site	TV	Result	Attendance
September 4	6:00 p.m.	at Fort Hays State	Lewis Field; Hays, KS		W 26–7	4,133
September 13	6:00 p.m.	Missouri Western State	Wantland Stadium; Edmond, OK		W 26–17	4,512
September 20	2:00 p.m.	at Emporia State	Welch Stadium; Emporia, KS		W 24–14	5,463
September 27	1:00 p.m.	No. 1 Northwest Missouri State	Wantland Stadium; Edmond, OK		L 13–36	4,518
October 4	2:07 p.m.	at Nebraska–Kearney	Ron & Carol Cope Stadium; Kearney, NE	MIAA	W 49–0	4,500
October 11	2:07 p.m.	Missouri Southern State	Wantland Stadium; Edmond, OK	MIAA	W 43–41 ^{3OT}	2,368
October 18	1:30 p.m.	at Central Missouri	Audrey J. Walton Stadium; Warrensburg, MO		L 19–31	9,783
October 25	1:00 p.m.	Washburn	Wantland Stadium; Edmond, OK		W 35–26	2,112
November 1	2:00 p.m.	Northeastern State^{†}	Wantland Stadium; Edmond, OK (President's Cup)		W 28–10	6,128
November 8	1:30 p.m.	at Lindenwood	Harlen C. Hunter Stadium; St. Charles, MO		W 45–13	1,332
November 15	2:00 p.m.	No. 6 Pittsburg State	Wantland Stadium; Edmond, OK	MIAA	L 14–41	3,956
December 6	12:00 p.m.	vs. Sioux Falls	Tiger Stadium; Excelsior Springs, MO (Mineral Water Bowl)		L 10–42	1,500
^{†}Homecoming; Rankings from AFCA DII Coaches' Poll released prior to game; All times are in Central time

== Coaching staff ==
Name	Position	Season at Central Oklahoma
Nick Bobeck	Head coach	3rd
Chris Martin	Offensive coordinator, Quarterbacks	3rd
Russ Pickett	Defensive coordinator, Assistant head coach	3rd
David Johnson	Running backs	1st
Tyler Holland	Defensive backs	3rd
Jason Smelser	Linebackers Special teams coordinator	1st
Walter Moreham	Defensive line	3rd
Jacob Black	Strength and Conditioning	-
Reference: 2014 UCO Media Guide

== Rankings ==
Ranking movements Legend: ██ Increase in ranking ██ Decrease in ranking — = Not ranked RV = Received votes
	Week												
Poll	Pre	1	2	3	4	5	6	7	8	9	10	11	Final
AFCA	—	—	RV	RV	RV	RV	RV	RV	RV	RV	RV	RV	—
D2football.com	—	—	—	—	—	—	25	22	—	—	—	—	—

== Game summaries ==
=== Fort Hays State ===
Central Oklahoma at Fort Hays

Team	1	2	Total
Central Oklahoma			0
Fort Hays State			0

- Game attendance: 4,133

== Statistics ==
=== Team ===
	UCO	Opp
Points per game	27.2	23.2
First downs	231	252
Rushing	102	126
Passing	114	108
Penalty	15	18
Rushing yardage	2274	2449
Rushing attempts	427	487
Avg per rush	4.8	5.0
Avg per game	189.5	204.1
Passing Yardage	2304	2378
Avg per game	192.0	198.2
Completions-Attempts	214-352 (60.8%)	205-380 (53.9%)
Total offense	4,578	4,827
Total plays	824	867
Avg per play	5.6	5.6
Avg per game	381.5	402.2
Fumbles-Lost	16-5	20-11

	UCO	Opp
Punts-Yards	67-2,472 (36.9 avg)	53-2140 (40.4 avg)
Punt returns-Total yards	13-124 (9.5 avg)	34-273 (8.0 avg)
Kick returns-Total yards	37-783 (21.2 avg)	50-1048 (21.0 avg)
Avg time of possession per game	30:38	29:22
Penalties-Yards	67-636	79-674
Avg per game	53.0	56.2
3rd down conversions	76/180 (42%)	69/166 (42%)
4th down conversions	3/8 (38%)	8/21 (38%)
Sacks by-Yards	17-126	35-218
Total TDs	42	35
Rushing	29	18
Passing	9	14
Field goals-Attempts	13-21 (62%)	11-22 (50%)
PAT-Attempts	39-39 (100%)	33-34 (97%)
Total attendance	23,594	25,211
Games-Avg per game	6-3,932	5-5,042

=== Scores by quarter ===
	1	2	3	4	OT	Total
Opponents	81	61	54	62	20	278
Central Oklahoma	48	96	72	94	22	332
