= 1974 Midland Warriors football team =

American college football season

1974 Midland Warriors football

NIAC champion

Mineral Water Bowl, W 32-6 vs. Friends
- Conference: Nebraska Intercollegiate Athletic Conference
- Record: 11–0 (5–0 NIAC)
- Head coach: Don Watchorn (4th season)
- Home stadium: Military Memorial Field

1974 Nebraska Intercollegiate Athletic Conference football standings
	Conf.					Overall
Team	W		L		T	W		L		T
No. 6 Midland $	5	–	0	–	0	11	–	0	–	0
Doane	4	–	1	–	0	6	–	3	–	0
Hastings	3	–	2	–	0	5	–	4	–	0
Concordia (NE)	2	–	3	–	0	5	–	4	–	1
Nebraska Wesleyan	1	–	4	–	0	3	–	6	–	0
Dana	0	–	5	–	0	0	–	7	–	1
$ – Conference champion; Rankings from NAIA Division II poll

The 1974 Midland Warriors football team was an American football team that represented Midland University as a member of the Nebraska Intercollegiate Athletic Conference (NIAC) during the 1974 NAIA Division II football season. In their fourth year under head coach Don Watchorn, the Warriors compiled a perfect 11–0 record (5–0 in conference games), won the NIAC championship, and outscored all opponents by a total of 361 to 70. It remains the only perfect season in Midland's football history.

The team played its home games at Military Memorial Field in Fremont, Nebraska.

== Schedule ==
Date	Opponent	Site	Result	Attendance	Source
September 7	Peru State	Military Memorial Field; Fremont, NE	W 31–12		
September 14	at Simpson*	Indianola, IA	W 23–7		
September 21	Wayne State (NE)*	Fremont, NE	W 15–22 (forfeit)		
September 28	at Tarkio*	Tarkio, MO	W 41–7		
October 5	Hastings	Military Memorial Field; Fremont, NE	W 26–13		
October 12	at Doane	Simon Field; Crete, NE	W 7–6		
October 19	Dana^{†}	Military Memorial Field; Fremont, NE	W 69–0		
October 26	at Concordia (NE)	Seward, NE	W 65–0		
November 2	Nebraska Wesleyan	Military Memorial Field; Fremont, NE	W 38–6		
November 9	at Westmar*	Lemars, IA	W 27–13		
November 23	vs. Friends*	Excelsior Springs, MO (Mineral Water Bowl)	W 32–6		
*Non-conference game; ^{†}Homecoming
