= Mineral Water Bowl =

Annual American NCAA Division II college football bowl game

Mineral Water Bowl (defunct)
- Excelsior Springs Mineral Water Bowl
- Stadium: Tiger Stadium (2003–2019)
- Location: Excelsior Springs, Missouri
- Previous stadiums: Roosevelt Field
- Operated: 1948–1951, 1954–1975, 1992–2019
- Conference tie-ins: NSIC (2000–2019); At-large (2018–2019)
- Previous conference tie-ins: MIAA (2000–2017)

Sponsors
- Quarterback Club of Excelsior Springs

The Mineral Water Bowl was an annual American NCAA Division II college football bowl game held in Excelsior Springs, Missouri at Tiger Stadium. Throughout its long history (1948 to 2019), the game was sponsored by the Quarterback Club, a civic organization in Excelsior Springs. At the time of its demise, it was one of four Division II sanctioned bowl games, along with the Live United Texarkana Bowl, the Heritage Bowl, and the America's Crossroads Bowl.

== History ==
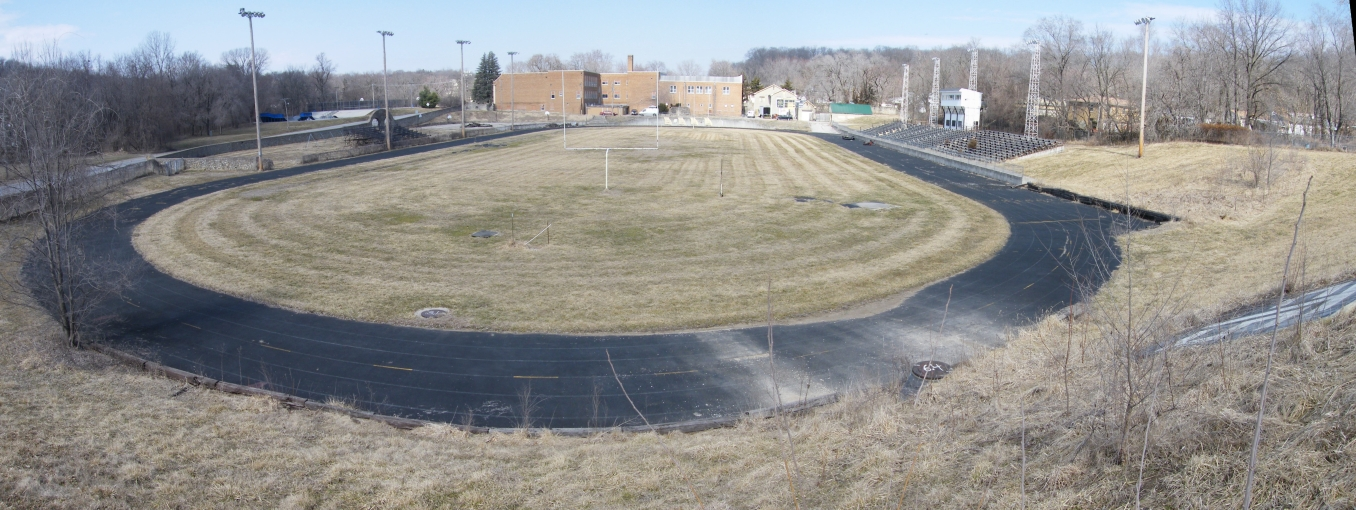
Roosevelt Field at Excelsior Springs High School which was home to the bowl until the school moved in 2003. The stadium is on the banks of the Fishing River near downtown Excelsior Springs blocks from the Hall of Waters Historic District and Elms Hotel

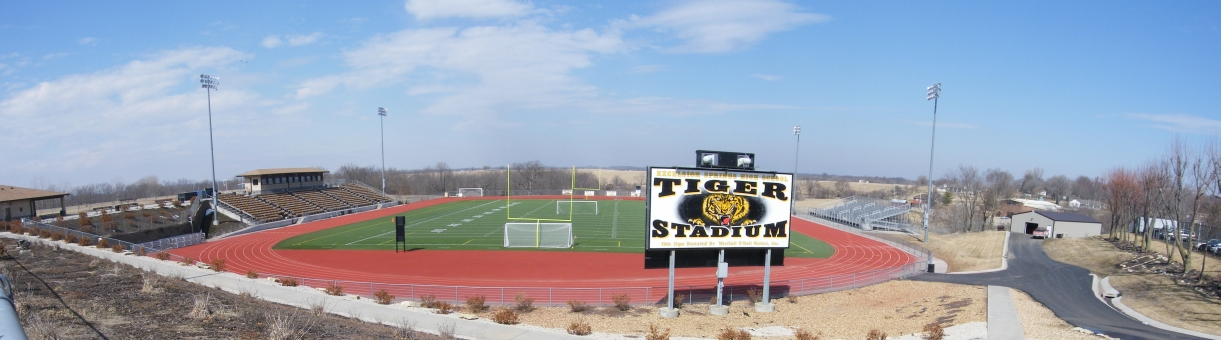
Tiger Stadium at the new Excelsior Springs High School on the edge of Excelsior Springs

The first Mineral Water Bowl was played on Thanksgiving Day in 1948. The game was established to showcase the Excelsior Springs High School team against another Missouri high school squad, but the Missouri High School Athletic Association never officially sanctioned it and forbade Excelsior Springs from playing in the game after 1950. (It remains unclear why Excelsior Springs was singled out while the association continued to sanction other Thanksgiving football games in the state, such as Kirkwood vs. Webster Groves, still played to this day). After the 1951 contest, which featured two opponents from outside the area, the high school Mineral Water Bowl was discontinued.

At the end of the 1952 season, an attempt to revive the bowl as a small-college contest failed after Northeast Missouri State (today Truman State), that year's co-champions of the Missouri Intercollegiate Athletics Association (today the Mid-America Intercollegiate Athletics Association), turned down an invitation to participate. Undeterred by this setback, local organizers succeeded in bringing back the game as a small-college bowl two years later, in 1954. The game was eventually moved from Thanksgiving Day to the Saturday before or after the holiday. As of 1957, it was one of 11 sanctioned NCAA bowl games. The bowl continued in the small-college format, hosting teams from as far away as Michigan and Colorado, but the pool of potential quality opponents dwindled after the onset of football playoffs for NCAA Division II and Division III, in 1973. Despite featuring a Missouri school in 11 of 22 contests, the bowl suffered from declining interest and was discontinued for a second time after the 1975 game. Crowds had dwindled from a peak of 7,000 in the 1960s to just 1,500 in 1974.

After a gap of seventeen years, the bowl was revived as a National Junior College Athletic Association (NJCAA) postseason game, held annually on the first Saturday in December starting in 1992. In the 1996 contest, Blinn (TX) defeated Coffeyville (KS) for the NJCAA championship. The junior college bowl typically featured top-ranked teams, and the Kansas community college league--closest to the game site geographically--provided teams for six of the games, but after eight years the sponsors opted to make it an NCAA bowl once again, this time for teams from Division II.

Starting in 2000, representatives from the Mid-America Intercollegiate Athletics Association (MIAA) and Northern Sun Intercollegiate Conference (NSIC) were chosen yearly for the game, with invitations going to the top-placing team in each conference not receiving a bid to the NCAA Division II National Football Championship playoffs. The arrangement between the MIAA and NSIC continued until 2017 but was eventually strained when the MIAA began to send its top non-playoff teams to four other Division II bowl games: the now-defunct Kanza Bowl (from 2009 through 2012), C.H.A.M.P.S. Heart of Texas Bowl (in 2016 and 2017), and Live United Texarkana Bowl (in 2014, 2015, and 2017), along with the Heritage Bowl (in 2017). After 2017, the NSIC had the only automatic bid to the game, with its representative facing an at-large opponent. The 2018 game featured teams from the NSIC and the Great Lakes Valley Conference. The 2019 game once again included representatives from the NSIC and MIAA, the latter chosen as an at-large team.

The COVID-19 pandemic forced the cancellation of all Division II postseason football games in 2020. Local organizers hoped to hold the Mineral Water Bowl in 2021, but after failing to do so, they finally gave up on continuing the game in 2022, citing a lack of sponsors.

== All-time scores ==
=== High school ===
Date played	Winning team		Losing team	
November 25, 1948	Excelsior Springs (MO)	48	Mexico (MO)	18
November 24, 1949	Excelsior Springs	12	North Kansas City (MO)	6
November 23, 1950	Raytown (MO)	7	Excelsior Springs	0
November 22, 1951	Harrisonville (MO)	14	Higginsville (MO)	13

=== Small college ===
Date played	Winning team		Losing team	
November 25, 1954	Hastings	20	College of Emporia	14
November 24, 1955	Missouri Valley	31	Hastings	7
November 22, 1956	St. Benedict's	14	Northeastern State (OK)	13
November 30, 1957	William Jewell	33	Hastings	14
November 22, 1958	Lincoln (MO)	21	Emporia State	0
November 28, 1959	College of Emporia	21	Austin	20
November 26, 1960	Hillsdale	17	Iowa State Teachers	6
November 25, 1961	Northeast Missouri State	22	Parsons	8
November 24, 1962	Adams State	23	Northern Illinois	20
November 30, 1963	Northern Illinois	21	Southwest Missouri State	14
November 28, 1964	North Dakota State	14	Western State (CO)	13
November 27, 1965	North Dakota	37	Northern Illinois	20
November 26, 1966	Adams State	14	Southwest Missouri State	8
November 25, 1967	William Jewell	14	Doane	14
November 30, 1968	Doane	10	Central Missouri State	0
November 29, 1969	Saint John's (MN)	21	Simpson	0
November 28, 1970	Franklin IN	40	Wayne State (NE)	12
December 4, 1971	Bethany (KS)	17	Missouri Valley	14
November 18, 1972	Ottawa (KS)	27	Friends	20
November 17, 1973	William Jewell	20	St. Mary of the Plains	9
November 23, 1974	Midland	32	Friends	6
November 22, 1975	Missouri Western State	44	Graceland	0

=== Junior college ===
Date played	Winning team		Losing team		References
December 5, 1992	Garden City	12	Itawamba	10	
December 4, 1993	Northeastern Oklahoma A&M	52	Butler County	50	
December 3, 1994	Hinds	19	Blinn	17	
December 2, 1995	Middle Georgia	42	Hutchinson	37	
December 7, 1996	Blinn	43	Coffeyville	14	
December 6, 1997	Snow	26	Coffeyville	22	
December 5, 1998	Middle Georgia	41	Northeast Mississippi	3	
December 4, 1999	Blinn	29	Fort Scott	20	

=== NCAA Division II ===
Date played	Winning team		Losing team		Notes
December 2, 2000	Winona State (NSIC)	43	Missouri Western (MIAA)	41	3OT
December 1, 2001	Central Missouri (MIAA)	48	Minnesota–Duluth (NSIC)	17	
December 7, 2002	Emporia State (MIAA)	34	Winona State (NSIC)	27	OT
December 6, 2003	Missouri Western (MIAA)	24	Concordia (MN) (NSIC)	14	
December 4, 2004	Washburn (MIAA)	36	Northern State (NSIC)	33	
December 3, 2005	Missouri Western (MIAA)	35	Concordia (MN) (NSIC)	23	
December 2, 2006	Pittsburg State (MIAA)	35	Bemidji State (NSIC)	27	
December 1, 2007	Missouri Western (MIAA)	20	Wayne State (NE) (NSIC)	13	
December 6, 2008	Augustana (SD) (NSIC)	37	Missouri Western (MIAA)	16	
December 5, 2009	Missouri Western (MIAA)	34	Augustana (SD) (NSIC)	21	
December 4, 2010	Pittsburg State (MIAA)	13	Concordia (MN) (NSIC)	9	
December 3, 2011	Minnesota State (NSIC)	28	Northeastern State (Ind.)+	14	
December 1, 2012	Winona State (NSIC)	41	Lindenwood (MIAA)	21	
December 7, 2013	Pittsburg State (MIAA)	90	Southwest Minnesota State (NSIC)	28	
December 6, 2014	Sioux Falls (NSIC)	42	Central Oklahoma (MIAA)	10	
December 5, 2015	Minnesota–Duluth (NSIC)	30	Fort Hays State (MIAA)	22	
December 3, 2016	Bemidji State (NSIC)	36	Washburn (MIAA)	23	
December 2, 2017	Central Missouri (MIAA)	38	Minnesota–Duluth (NSIC)	28	
December 1, 2018	Missouri S&T (GLVC)	51	Minnesota State–Moorhead (NSIC)	16	
December 7, 2019	Nebraska–Kearney (MIAA)	50	Winona State (NSIC)	33	

+ - Northeastern State, an independent already admitted to the MIAA for 2012, received the conference's bowl bid for 2011

== Appearances by team ==
This list is for appearances in the Mineral Water Bowl during its years as a postseason NCAA Division II game (2000 through 2019).

Rank	Team	Appearances	Record
1	Missouri Western	6	4–2
2	Winona State	4	2–2
3	Concordia (MN)	3	0–3
3	Minnesota–Duluth	3	1–2
3	Pittsburg State	3	3–0
T5	Augustana (SD)	2	1–1
T5	Bemidji State	2	1–1
T5	Central Missouri	2	2–0
T5	Washburn	2	1–1
T9	Central Oklahoma	1	0–1
T9	Emporia State	1	1–0
T9	Fort Hays State	1	0–1
T9	Lindenwood	1	0–1
T9	Minnesota State	1	1–0
T9	Minnesota State–Moorhead	1	0–1
T9	Missouri S&T	1	1–0
T9	Nebraska–Kearney	1	1–0
T9	Northeastern State	1	0–1
T9	Northern State	1	0–1
T9	Sioux Falls	1	1–0
T9	Southwest Minnesota State	1	0–1
T9	Wayne State (NE)	1	0–1
