= Doc Wadley Stadium =

- Interactive map of Doc Wadley Stadium
- Former names: Gable Field
- Location: Tahlequah, Oklahoma 74467
- Coordinates: 35.92863°N 94.9677°W
- Owner: Northeastern State University
- Operator: Northeastern State University
- Capacity: 8,300
- Surface: FieldTurf

Construction
- Opened: 1964
- Renovated: 2005
- Expanded: 2005

Tenants
- Northeastern State RiverHawks (NCAA) (1964–present); Tahlequah Tigers (OSSAA); Tahlequah City Vipers (4SFL)

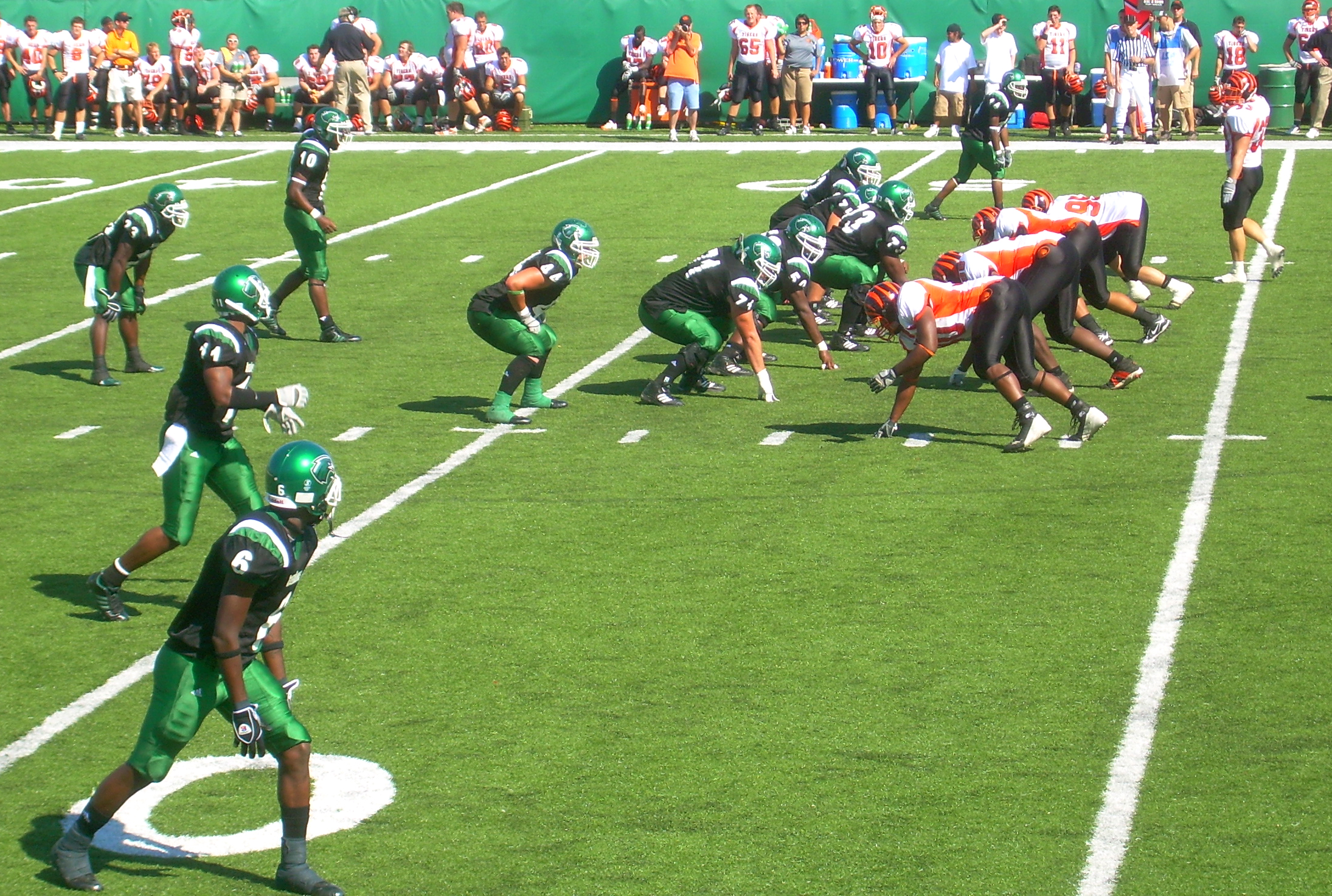
NSU Homecoming Game 2007

Doc Wadley Stadium located in Tahlequah, Oklahoma is the home stadium of the NCAA Division II college football team the RiverHawks of Northeastern State University.

The University also has consented to allow Doc Wadley Stadium to be used for other purposes—for example, the Tahlequah High School football team (the Tahlequah Tigers) schedules their home games there and the field is also used for marching band contests. The Tahlequah City Vipers are an adult amateur team that also leases the stadium.

Doc Wadley Stadium underwent a $3.5 million renovation in 2014 which included an expanded seating capacity to 8,300, installing artificial turf, installing a video scoreboard, and additional restrooms and concession areas.
