= Live United Texarkana Bowl =

Live United Texarkana Bowl (defunct)
- Stadium: Razorback Stadium
- Location: Texarkana, Arkansas
- Operated: 2013–2023
- Conference tie-ins: GAC vs. at-large (2013-2016), GAC vs. MIAA (2017-2023)

The Live United Texarkana Bowl was an American NCAA Division II college football bowl game held at Razorback Stadium in Texarkana, Arkansas. The game was established in 2013 and played annually through 2023 with the exception of 2020, when it was cancelled due to the COVID-19 pandemic. From 2020 to 2023 the title sponsor was Farmers Bank & Trust.

== History ==
In each of its ten seasons, bowl's selection committee extended an invitation to the highest-standing team from the Great American Conference (GAC) that did not qualify for the NCAA Division II Football Championship playoffs. Initially, the opponent was an at-large team selected from either the Lone Star Conference (LSC) or the Mid-America Intercollegiate Athletics Association (MIAA). Starting in 2017, when teams from the GAC, MIAA, and LSC also became eligible for bids to the Heritage Bowl (played in Corsicana, Texas), the Texarkana game became a GAC-MIAA matchup. At the time of its demise, the Live United Bowl was the oldest of four Division II sanctioned bowl games. The others were the Heritage Bowl, America's Crossroads Bowl, and Florida Beach Bowl.

The game raised between $10,000 and $15,000 annually for the United Way of Greater Texarkana. It also generated an estimated $500,000 per year for the local economy. Despite these successes, on July 2, 2024, Texarkana (Arkansas) mayor Allen Brown announced that the game was being "retired" after a run of ten seasons. Brown, who also served as bowl president, called it "disappointing" that the game was "not really supported by our local community." He noted that "sponsorships have declined" while "expenses have continued to increase."

== Game results ==
Date played	Winning team		Losing team		notes
December 13, 2013	Harding (GAC)	44	Texas A&M–Commerce (LSC)	3	
December 6, 2014	Central Missouri (MIAA)	48	Southeastern Oklahoma State (GAC)	21	
December 5, 2015	Central Oklahoma (MIAA)	38	Southwestern Oklahoma State (GAC)	21	
December 3, 2016	Texas A&M–Kingsville (LSC)	24	Southern Arkansas (GAC)	17	
December 2, 2017	Pittsburg State (MIAA)	48	Arkansas Tech (GAC)	31	
December 1, 2018	Missouri Western (MIAA)	30	Southern Arkansas (GAC)	25	
December 7, 2019	Missouri Western (MIAA)	35	Henderson State (GAC)	14	
December 4, 2021	Southeastern Oklahoma State (GAC)	37	Emporia State (MIAA)	34	
December 3, 2022	Emporia State (MIAA)	48	Southeastern Oklahoma State (GAC)	27	
December 2, 2023	Southern Arkansas (GAC)	43	Missouri Western (MIAA)	27	

== Wins by conference ==
Conference	Games	Win	Loss	Pct
Mid-America	8	6	2	.750
Lone Star	2	1	1	.500
Great American	10	3	7	.300

== Appearances by team ==
Team	Appearances	Record
Central Missouri	1	1–0
Central Oklahoma	1	1–0
Harding	1	1–0
Pittsburg State	1	1–0
Texas A&M–Kingsville	1	1–0
Missouri Western	3	2–1
Emporia State	2	1–1
Southern Arkansas	3	1–2
Southeastern Oklahoma State	3	1–2
Arkansas Tech	1	0–1
Henderson State	1	0–1
Southwestern Oklahoma State	1	0–1
Texas A&M–Commerce	1	0–1
