= Missouri Western Griffons football =

American college football team

- First season: 1970; 56 years ago
- Athletic director: Andy Carter
- Head coach: Tyler Fenwick; 3rd season, 12–11 (.522)
- Location: St. Joseph, Missouri
- Stadium: Spratt Stadium (capacity: 7,200)
- Field: Craig Field
- NCAA division: Division II
- Conference: The MIAA
- Colors: Black and gold
- All-time record: 323–263–9 (.550)

Conference championships
- 2 (2003, 2012)
- Mascot: Max the Griffon
- Outfitter: Nike
- Website: gogriffons.com/football

The Missouri Western Griffons football program represents Missouri Western State University in college football and competes in the Division II level (D-II) of the National Collegiate Athletic Association (NCAA). In 1989, Missouri Western became a member of the Missouri Intercollegiate Athletic Association, which was renamed the Mid-America Intercollegiate Athletics Association (MIAA), and has remained in the league. Missouri Western's home games are played at Spratt Stadium in St. Joseph, Missouri.

Missouri Western's football program dates back to 1970. The Griffons won two conference championships, in 2003 and 2012. Under Jerry Partridge the Griffons have appeared in the Division II playoffs in 2006, 2010, 2011, and 2012.

The team is coached by Tyler Fenwick, who enters his first season in 2023.

== Conference affiliations ==
- Central States Intercollegiate Conference (1976–1988)
- Mid-America Intercollegiate Athletics Association (1989–present)

== Conference championships ==
| Year | Conference | Coach | Over. | Conf. |
|---|---|---|---|---|
| 2003^{†} | MIAA | Jerry Partridge | 9–3 | 7–2 |
| 2012 | MIAA | Jerry Partridge | 12–2 | 9–1 |
Total conference championships: 2
† Denotes co-champions

== All-time record vs. current MIAA teams ==
Official record (including any NCAA imposed vacates and forfeits) against all current MIAA opponents as of the end of the 2024 season:

| Opponent | Won | Lost | Tied | Percentage | Streak | First meeting |
|---|---|---|---|---|---|---|
| Central Missouri | 19 | 22 | 1 | .464 | Won 1 | 1975 |
| Central Oklahoma | 10 | 6 | 0 | .625 | Lost 1 | 2005 |
| Emporia State | 28 | 20 | 0 | .583 | Lost 1 | 1976 |
| Fort Hays State | 19 | 15 | 1 | .557 | Lost 1 | 1976 |
| Missouri Southern | 33 | 23 | 0 | .589 | Won 1 | 1970 |
| Nebraska–Kearney | 14 | 22 | 0 | .389 | Lost 1 | 1970 |
| Northwest Missouri State | 12 | 35 | 0 | .255 | Lost 13 | 1981 |
| Pittsburg State | 14 | 37 | 0 | .275 | Lost 1 | 1970 |
| Washburn | 29 | 23 | 2 | .556 | Lost 1 | 1972 |
| Totals | 178 | 203 | 4 | .468 | | |

== Stadium ==
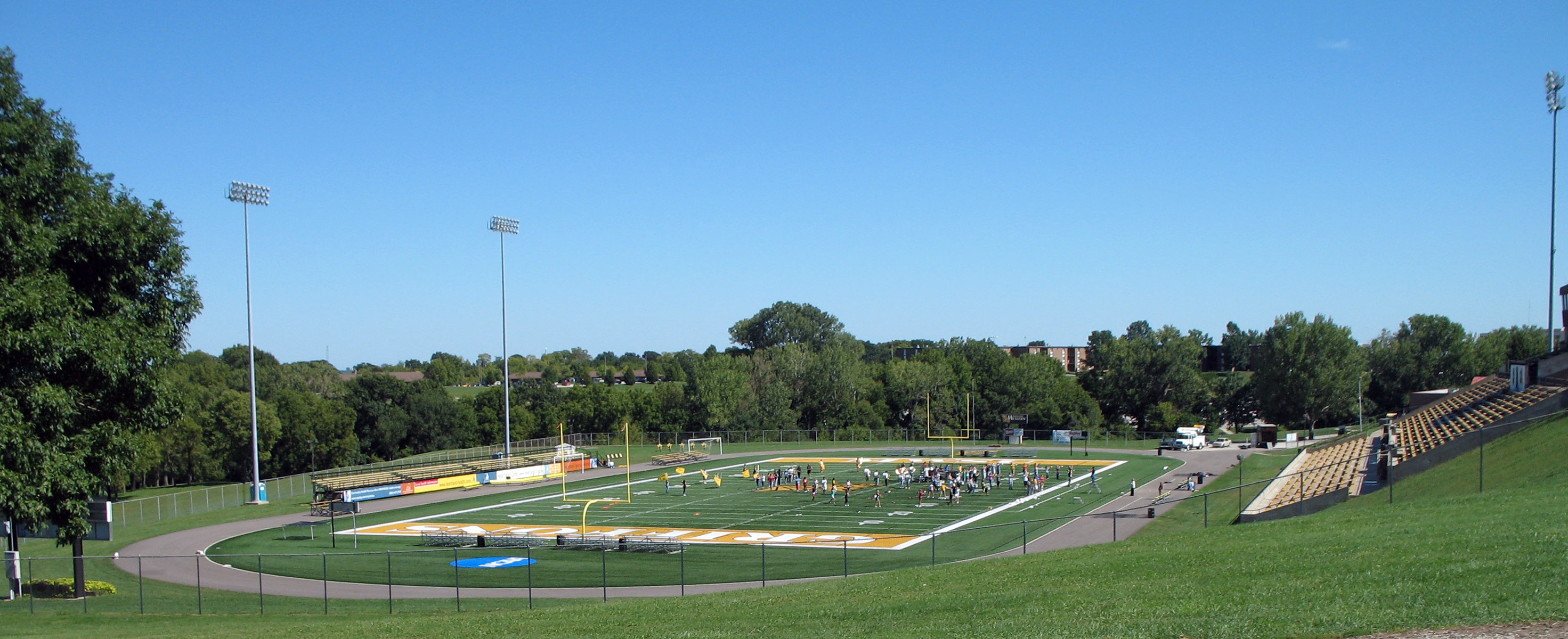
Spratt Stadium, home venue

The Griffons have played their home games at Spratt Stadium since 1979. The current capacity of the stadium is at 7,200.
