= Tom Eckert =

American football coach and former quarterback

Playing career
- 1961–1962: Florida State
- 1963: Hardin–Simmons
- 1964–1965: Northeastern State
- 1966: Tulsa Oilers
- Position: Quarterback

Coaching career (HC unless noted)
- 1968–1970: Field Kindley HS (KS)
- 1971–1986: Northeastern State (DC)
- 1987–2002: Northeastern State

Head coaching record
- Overall: 101–71–3 (college); 16–9–2 (high school)
- Tournaments: 4–4 (NAIA D-I playoffs); 2–2 (NCAA D-II playoff)

Accomplishments and honors

Championships
- 1 NAIA Division I (1994); 5 OIC (1987, 1990–1991, 1994–1995); 2 LSC (1999–2000); 2 LSC North Division (1999–2000)

Awards
- NAIA Division I Coach of the Year (1994)

Tom Eckert is an American former football player and coach. He served as the head football coach at Northeastern State University in Tahlequah, Oklahoma from 1987 to 2002, compiling a record of 101–71–3. During that time, he led his team to the NCAA Division II playoffs in 1999 and 2000.

Eckert played professional football for one season as a quarterback for the Tulsa Oilers of the Texas Football League in 1966.

== Head coaching record ==
=== College ===
Year	Team	Overall	Conference	Standing	Bowl/playoffs
Northeastern State Redmen (Oklahoma Intercollegiate Conference) (1987–1996)
1987	Northeastern State	7–4	3–1	T–1st	L NAIA Division I First Round
1988	Northeastern State	4–6	2–2	T–2nd	
1989	Northeastern State	2–8	1–3	T–4th	
1990	Northeastern State	7–3–1	4–0	1st	L NAIA Division I Quarterfinal
1991	Northeastern State	10–1	5–0	1st	L NAIA Division I Quarterfinal
1992	Northeastern State	5–2–2	3–2	T–3rd	
1993	Northeastern State	5–5	2–3	T–4th	
1994	Northeastern State	11–2	4–1	T–1st	W NAIA Division I Championship
1995	Northeastern State	7–5	4–1	1st	L NAIA Division I Championship
1996	Northeastern State	3–8	NA	NA	
Northeastern State Redmen (Lone Star Conference) (1997–2002)
1997	Northeastern State	4–7	4–4 / 4–2	7th / 3rd (North)	
1998	Northeastern State	8–2	6–2 / 6–2	4th / 2nd (North)	
1999	Northeastern State	10–4	7–2 / 7–2	T–1st / T–1st (North)	L NCAA Division II Semifinal
2000	Northeastern State	9–2	7–1 / 5–0	1st / 1st (North)	L NCAA Division II First Round
2001	Northeastern State	5–5	4–4 / 3–2	T–7th / 3rd (North)	
2002	Northeastern State	4–7	2–6 / 2–3	T–10th / T–4th (North)	
Northeastern State:		101–71–3	58–32		
Total:		101–71–3			
National championship Conference title Conference division title or championship game berth
