= List of Missouri Southern Lions football seasons =

The Missouri Southern Lions college football team competes as part of the National Collegiate Athletic Association (NCAA) Division II, and represents Missouri Southern State University in the Mid-America Intercollegiate Athletics Association (MIAA). The Lions play their home games at Fred G. Hughes Stadium in Joplin, Missouri since 1975. Since their inaugural season, Missouri Southern has appeared in one NAIA Division II National Championship Game, and one NCAA Division II playoffs.

For the 1968–75 seasons, Missouri Southern competed as a NAIA independent, unaffiliated with a conference. They would later join the Central States intercollegiate conference. In 1989 the Lions joined the Missouri Intercollegiate Athletic Association, later renamed the Mid-America Intercollegiate Athletics Association, and the NCAA Division II ranks.

== Seasons ==
National champions †	Conference champions *	Shared standing T

Season	Head coach	Conference	Season results								Postseason	Final ranking	
Season	Head coach	Conference	Overall			Conference					Postseason result	AFCA Poll	D2fb.com Poll
Season	Head coach	Conference	Wins	Losses	Ties	Wins	Losses	Ties	Conference finish	Division finish	Postseason result	AFCA Poll	D2fb.com Poll
Missouri Southern Lions
1968	Jim Johnson	Independent	2	8	0	—	—	—	—	—	—	—	—
1969	Reuben Berry	Independent	2	8	0	—	—	—	—	—	—	—	—
1970	Reuben Berry	Independent	2	7	1	—	—	—	—	—	—	—	—
1971	Jim Frazier	Independent	4	6	0	—	—	—	—	—	—	—	—
1972 †	Jim Frazier	Independent	12	0	0	—	—	—	—	—	Won NAIA Division II Championship against Northwestern (IA), 21–14	—	—
1973	Jim Frazier	Independent	4	6	0	—	—	—	—	—	—	—	—
1974	Jim Frazier	Independent	6	3	0	—	—	—	—	—	—	—	—
1975	Jim Frazier	Independent	7	3	1	—	—	—	—	—	—	—	—
1976 *	Jim Frazier	CSIC	8	2	0	4	1	0	T–1st	—	—	—	—
1977	Jim Frazier	CSIC	5	5	0	2	5	0	T–5th	—	—	—	—
1978	Jim Frazier	CSIC	6	3	1	4	2	1	T–2nd	—	—	—	—
1979	Jim Frazier	CSIC	5	6	0	3	4	0	T–3rd	—	—	—	—
1980	Jim Frazier	CSIC	6	3	1	4	3	0	T–3rd	—	—	—	—
1981	Jim Frazier	CSIC	6	4	1	5	2	0	T–2nd	—	—	—	—
1982	Jim Frazier	CSIC	7	2	1	5	1	1	3rd	—	—	—	—
1983	Jim Frazier	CSIC	9	2	0	5	2	0	2nd	—	—	—	—
1984	Jim Frazier	CSIC	6	3	0	5	2	0	T–2nd	—	—	—	—
1985	Jim Frazier	CSIC	6	4	0	4	3	0	T–3rd	—	—	—	—
1986	Rod Giesselmann	CSIC	2	7	0	2	5	0	T–5th	—	—	—	—
1987	Rod Giesselmann	CSIC	3	7	0	3	4	0	5th	—	—	—	—
1988	Bill Cooke	CSIC	3	7	0	2	5	0	T–6th	—	—	—	—
1989	Jon Lantz	MIAA	6	4	0	6	4	0	4th	—	—	—	—
1990	Jon Lantz	MIAA	4	5	0	4	5	0	T–5th	—	—	—	—
1991	Jon Lantz	MIAA	8	3	0	7	2	0	2nd	—	—	—	—
1992	Jon Lantz	MIAA	4	6	0	3	6	0	7th	—	—	—	—
1993 *	Jon Lantz	MIAA	9	1	1	9	0	0	1st	—	Lost NCAA First Round to Mankato State, 34–13	—	—
1994	Jon Lantz	MIAA	5	5	0	5	4	0	5th	—	—	—	—
1995	Jon Lantz	MIAA	6	4	0	5	4	0	5th	—	—	—	—
1996	Jon Lantz	MIAA	6	4	—	5	4	—	T–4th	—	—	—	—
1997	Jon Lantz/Rob Green	MIAA	7	3	—	6	3	—	T–3rd	—	—	—	—
1998	Greg Gregory	MIAA	3	7	—	3	6	—	T–6th	—	—	—	—
1999	Greg Gregory	MIAA	5	6	—	3	6	—	6th	—	—	—	—
2000	Bill Cooke	MIAA	2	9	—	2	7	—	8th	—	—	—	—
2001	Bill Cooke	MIAA	4	6	—	3	6	—	7th	—	—	—	—
2002	Bill Cooke	MIAA	5	6	—	3	6	—	7th	—	—	—	—
2003	Bill Cooke/Rob Green	MIAA	1	10	—	1	8	—	9th	—	—	—	—
2004	John Ware	MIAA	5	6	—	4	5	—	T–5th	—	—	—	—
2005	John Ware/Keeth Matheny	MIAA	3	7	—	2	6	—	7th	—	—	—	—
2006	Bart Tatum	MIAA	5	6	—	3	6	—	6th	—	—	—	—
2007	Bart Tatum	MIAA	6	5	—	5	4	—	T–4th	—	—	—	—
2008	Bart Tatum	MIAA	4	7	—	2	7	—	8th	—	—	—	—
2009	Bart Tatum	MIAA	3	7	—	3	6	—	T–7th	—	—	—	—
2010	Bart Tatum	MIAA	4	7	—	2	7	—	T–8th	—	—	—	—
2011	Bart Tatum	MIAA	3	7	—	2	7	—	T–8th	—	—	—	—
2012	Daryl Daye	MIAA	6	5	—	5	5	—	T–8th	—	—	—	—
2013	Daryl Daye	MIAA	7	3	—	5	3	—	6th	—	—	—	—
2014	Daryl Daye	MIAA	4	7	—	4	7	—	T–7th	—	—	—	—
2015	Denver Johnson	MIAA	1	10	—	1	10	—	11th	—	—	—	—
2016	Denver Johnson	MIAA	2	9	—	2	9	—	T–10th	—	—	—	—
2017	Denver Johnson	MIAA	0	11	—	0	11	—	12th	—	—	—	—
Total			301	258	7	—	—	—	(only includes regular season games)				
Total			2	1	0	—	—	—	(only includes playoff and bowl games; 2 appearances)				
Total						—	—	—	(all games)				
