= Hank Walbrick =

American football player and coach (born c. 1953)

Biographical details
- Born: c. 1953

Playing career
- 1971–1974: East Central
- Position: Linebacker

Coaching career (HC unless noted)
- 1977: Lawton HS (OK) (DB)
- 1980–1989: East Central (assistant)
- 1990–1998: East Central

Head coaching record
- Overall: 34–58–1
- Tournaments: 3–0 (NAIA playoffs)

Accomplishments and honors

Championships
- 1 NAIA Division I (1993); 1 OIC (1992)

Hank Walbrick (c. 1953) is an American former college football coach. He served as the head football coach at the East Central University in Ada, Oklahoma from 1990 to 1998, compiling a record of 34–58–1 and winning an NAIA Division I Football National Championship in 1993. A native of Lawton, Oklahoma, Walbrick played football at Lawton High School and college football at East Central, where he started at linebacker for three seasons. He returned to Lawton High School in 1977 as an assistant football coach.

== Head coaching record ==
| Year | Team | Overall | Conference | Standing | Bowl/playoffs |
|---|---|---|---|---|---|
East Central Tigers (Oklahoma Intercollegiate Conference) (1990–1996)
| 1990 | East Central | 1–9 | 0–4 | 5th | |
| 1991 | East Central | 5–4–1 | 2–3 | 4th | |
| 1992 | East Central | 6–3 | 4–1 | T–1st | |
| 1993 | East Central | 10–3 | 3–2 | T–2nd | W NAIA Division I Championship |
| 1994 | East Central | 3–7 | 2–3 | 4th | |
| 1995 | East Central | 4–7 | 1–4 | 6th | |
| 1996 | East Central | 3–7 | 1–4 | 5th | |
East Central Tigers (Lone Star Conference) (1997–1998)
| 1997 | East Central | 0–10 | 0–8 / 0–6 | 15th / 7th (North) | |
| 1998 | East Central | 2–8 | 1–7 / 1–7 | 13th / 6th (North) | |
| East Central: | | 34–58–1 | 14–36 | | |
| Total: | | 34–58–1 | | | |
National championship Conference title Conference division title or championship game berth
