= 1999 Northeastern State Redmen football team =

College football season

1999 Northeastern State Redmen football

LSC co-champion LSC North division champion

NCAA Division II Semifinal, L 7–42 vs. Carson–Newman
- Conference: Lone Star Conference
- North Division
- Record: 10–4 (7–2 LSC)
- Head coach: Tom Eckert (11th season)
- Home stadium: Gable Field

1999 Lone Star Conference football standings
	Conf.			Overall
Team	W		L	W		L
Overall
Northeastern State $^	7	–	2	10	–	4
No. 17 SE Oklahoma State $	6	–	2	7	–	4
No. 18 Central Oklahoma $^	6	–	2	8	–	3
Eastern New Mexico	6	–	3	8	–	3
Angelo State	6	–	3	8	–	3
Texas A&M–Kingsville	5	–	4	5	–	6
Tarleton State	5	–	4	5	–	6
SW Oklahoma State	4	–	5	5	–	5
Abilene Christian	4	–	5	4	–	6
Texas A&M–Commerce	4	–	5	4	–	7
Harding	3	–	5	5	–	5
East Central	3	–	6	3	–	7
Midwestern State	3	–	6	4	–	7
West Texas A&M	2	–	7	3	–	8
Ouachita Baptist	1	–	7	3	–	7
North Division
Northeastern State x$^	5	–	1	10	–	4
No. 17 SE Oklahoma State $	4	–	2	7	–	4
No. 18 Central Oklahoma $^	4	–	2	8	–	3
East Central	3	–	3	3	–	7
SW Oklahoma State	3	–	3	5	–	5
Harding	2	–	4	5	–	5
Ouachita Baptist	0	–	6	3	–	7
South Division
Angelo State x	5	–	2	8	–	3
Texas A&M–Commerce	4	–	3	4	–	7
Texas A&M–Kingsville	4	–	3	5	–	6
Eastern New Mexico	4	–	3	8	–	3
Tarleton State	3	–	4	5	–	6
Abilene Christian	3	–	4	4	–	6
Midwestern State	3	–	4	4	–	7
West Texas A&M	2	–	5	3	–	8
$ – Conference champion; x – Division champion/co-champions; ^ – NCAA Division II playoff participant; The LSC counted separate overall and division standings. The conference recognized tri-champions in 1999. Northeastern State's 7th win resulted from an uneven number of conference games played.; Rankings from NCAA Division II Football Committee poll

The 1999 Northeastern State Redmen football team represented Northeastern State University during the 1999 NCAA Division II football season as members of the Lone Star Conference. This was the 89th season of Redmen football. The Redmen played their home games at Gable Field in Tahlequah, Oklahoma, which has been Central's home stadium since 1964. The team was led by head coach Tom Eckert in his 11th season. The Redmen finished the regular season with an 8–3 record and a share of the Lone Star Conference (LSC) Championship.

The team made the deepest NCAA playoff run in school history (as of the end of the 2025 season). In just its third season after joining NCAA Division II from the NAIA, NSU advanced to its first NCAA Division II football championship, where it defeated fellow first-time participants Western Washington, 27–24 in overtime, in the first round. In the second round, NSU hosted and defeated UC Davis, 19–14; UC Davis was appearing in its fourth consecutive Division II playoff, and reached the semifinals in both 1996 and 1997. Northeastern State's playoff run ended in the national semifinals, where it lost 42–7 at defending national runners-up Carson–Newman.

== Regular season ==
NSU went 8-3 in the regular season, including a 7-2 mark in conference play, the league's best win-loss record. Due to the Lone Star Conference's (LSC) imbalanced scheduling, they shared the conference championship with a pair of 6-2 teams, Southeastern Oklahoma State and Central Oklahoma, both of whom the Redmen defeated.

Northeastern State finished the regular season with the best defense by yards allowed in Division II. Its season-ending win clinched its first back-to-back eight-win regular seasons since the early 1980s.

Eight Redmen were awarded all-conference honors: DB Itis Atkinson, DE Adam Beauchamp, TB Carlton Booe, LB Dallas Curtis, LB Marcus Gunn, DL Rod Kelly, OT Chris Meredith, and DB JoJo Polk.

=== Season-opening win over #3 ===
The first of NSU's three ranked wins in the regular season came in week one, against #3 Texas A&M–Kingsville (TAMUK). NSU held the Javelinas to just 68 total yards and four first downs in a 9-2 victory; kicker Michael Schokley's three field goals accounted for all of the team's scoring in a defensive battle. TAMUK's two points constituted its lowest total in a conference game since 1980. The loss was just the Javelinas' second conference defeat since 1991, and came despite NSU losing both its starting quarterback and tailback to injury during the game.

=== Losses in next two of three ===
The following week, the Redmen played poorly in a 28-7 loss at Missouri Southern (MSSU). NSU had broken a three-game losing streak to MSSU the previous year, but committed five turnovers and struggled to contain the Lions' rushing attack, which finished the game with 242 yards and three touchdowns. NSU bounced back the following week, coming from behind on the road to earn its first win in three meetings with Texas A&M–Commerce, 19-14. At 2-1, the Redmen entered the Week 1 NCAA Division II football ranking for the first time ever at #15.

In Week 4, NSU hosted undefeated and #7-ranked Eastern New Mexico (ENMU) in the first ranked NCAA matchup in the history of Gable Field. The Redmen led until a game-tying ENMU touchdown shortly before halftime, but the Greyhounds took the lead with a field goal on the opening drive of the second half. A subsequent NSU interception, missed field goal attempt, and blocked field goal attempt sealed a 20-14 defeat that knocked the Redmen from the national poll for the rest of the regular season.

=== Midseason win streak, damaging loss ===
NSU bounced back to win its next three games. Blowouts in Tahlequah bracketed a narrow road victory over Harding on October 9. The Redmen trailed 14-0 to open the game and never led in regulation. Early in the fourth quarter, a missed extra point attempt after a 14-play touchdown drive left the host Bisons with a 21-20 lead that they then extended to 28-20. Greg Bobbitt, who threw three interceptions on ten attempts in the game, nevertheless rushed 18 yards for a touchdown to pull within 28-26, then completed a pass on a two-point conversion to tie the game. Redmen defensive back JoJo Polk intercepted a Harding pass in the endzone to close out regulation. In overtime, Lamont Turner's long rush of the day (13 yards) set up first and goal, and two Carlton Booe rushes punched in his third rushing touchdown of the day. Although another failed extra point attempt left the Redmen vulnerable to a Bisons touchdown, the NSU defense did not allow positive yardage in the overtime period, and a fourth-down interception by Prentis Jenkins sealed the come-from-behind win.

Firmly back in the hunt for a conference title at 5-1 in mid-October, NSU seemingly dashed its chances with another poor road performance, blowing a two-score lead to lose at 3-3 Southwestern Oklahoma State. The loss left the Redmen at 5-2 in conference play, two games back in the loss column of two nationally ranked division rivals: #15 Southeastern Oklahoma State (coming to Tahlequah the following week) and #2 Central Oklahoma (to whom NSU was slated to travel for its regular-season finale).

=== Key season-ending wins over division rivals ===
NSU, however, won all three of its remaining games, which, combined with favorable results elsewhere, earned them a share of the LSC title and the program's first bid to the NCAA Division II playoffs. On October 30, they trounced Southeastern 30-3 to hand the #15 Savages their first LSC loss; Booe and Bobbitt both rushed for over 100 yards in the victory. After soundly defeating Oklahoma Panhandle State in a non-conference game, NSU traveled to Edmond, Oklahoma, to face Central Oklahoma (UCO) in the final week of the regular season.

Now ranked #18 after a loss at Southeastern on November 6, defending LSC champions UCO could clinch a share of their second-straight league title with a victory. NSU, meanwhile, needed both a win and a Southeastern Oklahoma State loss at 2-7 East Central in order to clinch a share of its first conference title as an NCAA member. The game started poorly for the Redmen, when UCO's defending All-Region lineman Claude Davis forced a fumble on the opening play from scrimmage, setting up the Bronchos with excellent field position to score an opening touchdown within four minutes of game time. NSU's defense kept it in the game, holding UCO quarterback Brett Manning to just 23 yards on 4-20 passing, and the Redmen got a field goal back in the third quarter. But they trailed until the fourth quarter, when Bobbitt, who had been pulled in favor of Trent Pitt on some drives during the game, led a 56-yard touchdown drive to pull the Redmen ahead, rushing for 23 yards and converting a key 3rd down with a 15-yard pass to Danny Ward. With NSU now leading 10-7, Polk intercepted a pass on the first play of the ensuing UCO drive, setting the tone for the Redmen to dominate the defending LSC champions for the rest of the game, in which NSU forced and recovered a fumble on a punt return, allowed no pass completions (and just one gain from scrimmage by UCO), forced a safety, and intercepted Manning for the fourth time on the day to clinch the victory.

Despite its first ranked road victory in the NCAA, NSU would not have shared the LSC title without East Central's narrow 14-13 victory over Southeastern on the same day. An unnecessary roughness penalty led to the Tigers' first touchdown, and Chris Barnes caught three first-down passes on the game-winning touchdown drive as part of a 106-yard receiving day.

== Schedule ==
Date	Time	Opponent	Site	Result	Attendance	Source
September 4	6:00 p.m.	No. 3 Texas A&M–Kingsville	Gable Field; Tahlequah, OK	W 9–2	7,000	
September 11	7:00 p.m.	at Missouri Southern*	Hughes Stadium; Joplin, MO	L 7–28	6,500	
September 18	7:00 p.m.	at Texas A&M–Commerce	Memorial Stadium; Commerce, TX	W 19–14	3,011	
September 25	6:00 p.m.	No. 7 Eastern New Mexico	Gable Field; Tahlequah, OK	L 14–20	6,000	
October 2	2:00 p.m.	East Central	Gable Field; Tahlequah, OK	W 40–3	7,500	
October 9	7:00 p.m.	at Harding	Alumni Field; Searcy, AR	W 34–28	3,150	
October 16	2:00 p.m.	Ouachita Baptist	Gable Field; Tahlequah, OK	W 57–0	2,500	
October 23	3:30 p.m.	at Southwestern Oklahoma State	Milam Stadium; Weatherford, OK	L 12–15	2,129	
October 30	2:00 p.m.	No. 15 Southeastern Oklahoma State	Gable Field; Tahlequah, OK	W 30–3	2,500	
November 6	1:00 p.m.	Oklahoma Panhandle State*	Gable Field; Tahlequah, OK	W 64–7	2,500	
November 13	2:00 p.m.	at No. 18 Central Oklahoma	Wantland Stadium; Edmond, OK (rivalry)	W 12–7	5,200	
November 20	1:15 p.m.	No. 11 Western Washington	Gable Field; Tahlequah, OK (NCAA Division II First Round)	W 27–24 ^{OT}	7,208	
November 27	1:05 p.m.	at No. 5 UC Davis	Toomey Field; Davis, CA (NCAA Division II Quarterfinal)	W 19–14	5,650	
December 4	1:00 p.m.	at No. 1 Carson–Newman	Burke–Tarr Stadium; Jefferson City, TN (NCAA Division II Semifinal)	L 7–42	4,051	
*Non-conference game; Rankings from NCAA Division II Football Committee Poll released prior to the game; All times are in Central time
