= 1980 NAIA Division I football season =

American college football season

- Regular season: August–November 1980
- Postseason: December 6–20, 1980
- National Championship: Burlington Memorial Stadium; Burlington, NC
- Champions: Elon

The 1980 NAIA Division I football season was the 25th season of college football sponsored by the NAIA, was the 11th season of play of the NAIA's top division for football.

The season was played from August to November 1980 and culminated in the 1980 NAIA Division I Champion Bowl. The title game was played on December 20, 1980 at Burlington Memorial Stadium in Burlington, North Carolina, near the campus of Elon College.

Elon defeated Northeastern State in the Champion Bowl, 17–10, to win their first NAIA national title.

== Conference standings ==
1980 Arkansas Intercollegiate Conference football standings
	Conf.					Overall
Team	W		L		T	W		L		T
No. 1 Central Arkansas $^	6	–	0	–	0	9	–	1	–	0
Southern Arkansas	5	–	1	–	0	6	–	5	–	0
Arkansas Tech	4	–	2	–	0	6	–	4	–	0
Henderson State	2	–	4	–	0	5	–	6	–	0
Arkansas–Monticello	2	–	4	–	0	4	–	7	–	0
Harding	1	–	5	–	0	3	–	8	–	0
Ouachita Baptist	1	–	5	–	0	2	–	8	–	0
$ – Conference champion; ^ – NAIA Division I playoff participant; Rankings from NAIA Division I poll

1980 Central States Intercollegiate Conference football standings
	Conf.					Overall
Team	W		L		T	W		L		T
No. 7 Kearney State $^	6	–	0	–	1	9	–	2	–	1
Pittsburg State	5	–	2	–	0	7	–	3	–	0
Missouri Southern	4	–	3	–	0	6	–	3	–	1
Fort Hays State	3	–	2	–	2	4	–	4	–	2
Missouri Western	3	–	3	–	1	5	–	3	–	2
Wayne State (NE)	3	–	4	–	0	4	–	5	–	0
Emporia State	1	–	6	–	0	2	–	8	–	0
Washburn	1	–	6	–	0	2	–	8	–	0
$ – Conference champion; ^ – NAIA Division I playoff participant; Rankings from NAIA Division I poll

1980 Evergreen Conference football standings
	Conf.					Overall
Team	W		L		T	W		L		T
No. 12 Eastern Oregon +	4	–	1	–	0	8	–	1	–	0
Oregon Tech +	4	–	1	–	0	7	–	2	–	0
Oregon College +	4	–	1	–	0	6	–	3	–	0
Southern Oregon	2	–	3	–	0	3	–	7	–	0
Central Washington	1	–	4	–	0	2	–	7	–	0
Western Washington	0	–	5	–	0	2	–	7	–	0
+ – Conference co-champions; Rankings from NAIA Division I poll

1980 Great Lakes Intercollegiate Athletic Conference football standings
	Conf.					Overall
Team	W		L		T	W		L		T
No. 20 Hillsdale $	5	–	1	–	0	7	–	4	–	0
Northwood	4	–	2	–	0	6	–	2	–	1
No. 18 Grand Valley State	4	–	2	–	0	7	–	3	–	0
Wayne State (MI)	3	–	3	–	0	5	–	4	–	0
Ferris State	2	–	3	–	1	4	–	4	–	2
Saginaw Valley State	2	–	4	–	0	5	–	6	–	0
Michigan Tech	0	–	5	–	1	2	–	6	–	1
$ – Conference champion; Rankings from NAIA Division I poll

1980 Lone Star Conference football standings
	Conf.					Overall
Team	W		L		T	W		L		T
Southwest Texas State $	6	–	1	–	0	8	–	3	–	0
No. 2 Angelo State ^	5	–	1	–	1	8	–	2	–	1
Texas A&I	5	–	2	–	0	7	–	4	–	0
No. 8 East Texas State ^	4	–	2	–	1	8	–	3	–	1
Stephen F. Austin	4	–	3	–	0	4	–	6	–	0
Sam Houston State	2	–	5	–	0	3	–	7	–	0
Abilene Christian	1	–	6	–	0	2	–	8	–	0
Howard Payne	0	–	7	–	0	1	–	8	–	1
$ – Conference champion; ^ – NAIA Division I playoff participant; Rankings from NAIA Division I poll

1980 Northern Intercollegiate Conference football standings
	Conf.					Overall
Team	W		L		T	W		L		T
Minnesota Duluth $	8	–	0	–	0	10	–	0	–	0
Minnesota Morris ^	7	–	1	–	0	9	–	2	–	1
No. 11 Moorhead State	6	–	2	–	0	8	–	2	–	0
St. Cloud State	5	–	3	–	0	6	–	4	–	0
Mankato State	3	–	5	–	0	3	–	7	–	0
Southwest State (MN)	2	–	5	–	1	3	–	6	–	1
Winona State	2	–	6	–	0	3	–	7	–	0
Northern State	1	–	6	–	1	2	–	7	–	1
Bemidji State	1	–	7	–	0	1	–	9	–	0
$ – Conference champion; ^ – NCAA Division III playoff participant; Rankings from NAIA Division I poll

1980 Oklahoma Intercollegiate Conference football standings
	Conf.					Overall
Team	W		L		T	W		L		T
No. 4 Northeastern State +^	3	–	1	–	0	11	–	2	–	0
No. 16 East Central +	3	–	1	–	0	7	–	3	–	0
SW Oklahoma State +	3	–	1	–	0	7	–	4	–	0
SE Oklahoma State	1	–	3	–	0	3	–	7	–	0
NW Oklahoma State	0	–	4	–	0	1	–	9	–	0
+ – Conference co-champions; ^ – NAIA Division I playoff participant; Rankings from NAIA Division I poll

1980 Rocky Mountain Athletic Conference football standings
	Conf.					Overall
Team	W		L		T	W		L		T
No. 9 Southern Colorado +	7	–	1	–	0	8	–	1	–	0
No. 10 Adams State +	7	–	1	–	0	8	–	3	–	0
Southern Utah	6	–	2	–	0	6	–	3	–	0
Western State (CO)	5	–	3	–	0	6	–	4	–	0
Colorado Mines	3	–	5	–	0	4	–	5	–	0
New Mexico Highlands	3	–	5	–	0	4	–	6	–	0
Mesa	3	–	5	–	0	3	–	6	–	0
Fort Lewis	2	–	6	–	0	2	–	7	–	0
Western New Mexico	0	–	8	–	0	1	–	8	–	0
+ – Conference co-champions; Rankings from NAIA Division I poll

1980 South Atlantic Conference football standings
	Conf.					Overall
Team	W		L		T	W		L		T
No. 5 Elon +^	6	–	1	–	0	13	–	1	–	0
No. 6 Mars Hill +^	6	–	1	–	0	8	–	2	–	1
Carson–Newman	5	–	2	–	0	7	–	3	–	0
Presbyterian	3	–	4	–	0	4	–	6	–	0
Lenoir–Rhyne	3	–	4	–	0	4	–	7	–	0
Newberry	3	–	4	–	0	3	–	6	–	0
Gardner–Webb	2	–	5	–	0	3	–	7	–	0
Catawba	0	–	7	–	0	1	–	9	–	0
+ – Conference co-champions; ^ – NAIA Division I playoff participant; Rankings from NAIA Division I poll

1980 West Virginia Intercollegiate Athletic Conference football standings
	Conf.					Overall
Team	W		L		T	W		L		T
Northern Division
No. 19 Shepherd xy	6	–	2	–	1	7	–	3	–	1
Fairmont State x	6	–	2	–	1	6	–	3	–	1
Salem	6	–	3	–	0	6	–	4	–	0
West Virginia Wesleyan	3	–	6	–	0	3	–	7	–	0
West Liberty State	0	–	9	–	0	0	–	10	–	0
Southern Division
No. 3 Concord xy$^	9	–	0	–	0	11	–	1	–	0
West Virginia State	6	–	3	–	0	6	–	4	–	0
West Virginia Tech	5	–	4	–	0	5	–	4	–	0
Bluefield State	1	–	7	–	1	1	–	7	–	1
Glenville State	1	–	7	–	1	1	–	8	–	1
Championship: Concord 19, Shepherd 0
$ – Conference champion; x – Division champion/co-champions; y – Championship game participant; ^ – NAIA Division I playoff participant; Rankings from NAIA Division I poll

1980 Wisconsin State University Conference football standings
	Conf.					Overall
Team	W		L		T	W		L		T
No. 14 Wisconsin–La Crosse +	6	–	2	–	0	8	–	2	–	0
No. 13 Wisconsin–River Falls +	6	–	2	–	0	8	–	2	–	0
Wisconsin–Whitewater +	6	–	2	–	0	8	–	3	–	0
Wisconsin–Platteville +	6	–	2	–	0	7	–	3	–	0
Wisconsin–Stout	5	–	3	–	0	6	–	4	–	0
Wisconsin–Oshkosh	3	–	5	–	0	4	–	6	–	0
Wisconsin–Stevens Point	2	–	6	–	0	4	–	6	–	0
Wisconsin–Eau Claire	2	–	6	–	0	3	–	8	–	0
Wisconsin–Superior	0	–	8	–	0	0	–	10	–	0
+ – Conference co-champions; Rankings from NAIA Division I poll

1980 NAIA Division I independents football records
	Conf.			Overall
Team	W	L	T	W		L		T
No. 17 Cameron		–		8	–	3	–	0
No. 15 Wofford		–		7	–	2	–	2
Liberty Baptist		–		7	–	3	–	0
Guilford		–		6	–	3	–	0
Central State (OK)		–		5	–	4	–	0
Kentucky State		–		5	–	6	–	0
Eastern New Mexico		–		2	–	7	–	1
Langston		–		1	–	8	–	0
Rankings from NAIA Division I poll

== Conference champions ==
Conference	Champion	Record
Arkansas Intercollegiate	Central Arkansas	6–0
Central States	Kearney State	6–0–1
Evergreen	Eastern Oregon; Oregon Tech	4–1
Great Lakes	Hillsdale	5–1
NIC	Minnesota–Duluth	8–0
Oklahoma	East Central State; Northeastern State; Southwestern Oklahoma State	3–1
RMAC	Adams State; Southern Colorado	7–1
South Atlantic	Elon; Mars Hill	6–1
Lone Star	Southwest Texas State	6–1
WVIAC	North: Shepherd and Fairmont State; South: Concord (WV)	6–2–1; 9–0
WSUC	Wisconsin–La Crosse; Wisconsin–River Falls	6–2; 6–2

== Postseason ==
Quarterfinals; December 6, 1980; Campus sites
Elon	17
Concord*	14
East Texas State	27
Central Arkansas*	21
Kearney State	9*
Mars Hill*	6
Angelo State	3
Northeastern State*	10

Semifinals; December 13, 1980; Campus sites
Elon	14
East Texas State*	6
Kearney State	0
Northeastern State*	14

1980 Champion Bowl; December 20, 1980; Burlington, NC
Elon*	17
Northeastern State	10

== See also ==
- 1980 NAIA Division II football season
- 1980 NCAA Division I-A football season
- 1980 NCAA Division I-AA football season
- 1980 NCAA Division II football season
- 1980 NCAA Division III football season
