= Kenny Evans (American football) =

American football coach (born 1960)

Biographical details
- Born: March 19, 1960 (age 65); Kansas, U.S.

Coaching career (HC unless noted)
- 1981: Miami HS (OK) (assistant)
- 1982–1984: Oklahoma (GA)
- 1985: Florida (WR)
- 1986–1988: Southeastern State (DC)
- 1989–1997: Missouri Southern (DC)
- 1998–2006: North Texas (AHC/DC)
- 2007: Louisiana Tech (LB)
- 2008–2013: Northeastern State
- 2014: Tulsa East Central HS (OK)
- 2015–2017: Missouri Southern (DC)
- 2018–2023: Rogers HS (AR) (DC)

Head coaching record
- Overall: 22–42 (college); 3–6 (high school)
- Bowls: 0–1

Accomplishments and honors

Championships
- 1 LSC North Division (2010)

Awards
- Football Foundation's National Assistant Coach of the Year (2005)

Kenneth Gwane Evans (born March 19, 1960) is a retired American football coach. Evans previously served as head football coach at Northeastern State University in Tahlequah, Oklahoma and East Central High School in Tulsa, Oklahoma. Evans has worked as an assistant coach at Oklahoma, Florida, North Texas, and Louisiana Tech.

== Coaching career ==
Evans began his coaching career in 1981 at Miami High School in Miami, Oklahoma. He joined the collegiate ranks the following year as a graduate assistant at the University of Oklahoma under coach Barry Switzer. Evans remained in that role until 1985, when he joined coach Galen Hall at the University of Florida as a wide receivers coach for one season. He then spent the next 12 years under coach Jon Lantz at Southeastern Oklahoma State and Missouri Southern. He helped turn both programs around as defensive and recruiting coordinator, and coached future NFL players such as Rod Smith.

Evans returned to the NCAA Division I level in 1998 as defensive coordinator at the University of North Texas under head coach Darrell Dickey. During his eight years coaching there, the Mean Green won four Sun Belt Conference championships and made four appearances at the New Orleans Bowl. He also received the National Assistant Coach of the Year award in 2005 by the Football Foundation. Evans later coached at Louisiana Tech under Derek Dooley for one season.

In 2008, Evans was hired as head coach of the Northeastern State RiverHawks football program. He led the Riverhawks to two of winning seasons, which included a Lone Star Conference North Division title in 2010 and an appearance in the Mineral Water Bowl in 2011. This was the program's first winning seasons in a decade. After joining the Mid-America Intercollegiate Athletics Association (MIAA), the Riverhawks posted a 4–6 record in 2012 and a 2–9 record in 2013. Immediately after the completion of the 2013 season, Evans was let go as head coach.

After a brief stint as head coach of East Central High School in Tulsa, Oklahoma, Evans returned to Missouri Southern as defensive coordinator under head coach Denver Johnson in 2015. In 2018, Evans returned to the high school level to become defensive coordinator at Rogers High School in Arkansas.

After a 42 year career in coaching, Evans retired in 2023.

== Personal life ==
Evans is married to Tammi, and has one son, Elliott.

== Head coaching record ==
=== College ===
Year	Team	Overall	Conference	Standing	Bowl/playoffs
Northeastern State RiverHawks (Lone Star Conference) (2008–2010)
2008	Northeastern State	1–10	0–9 / 0–5	13th / 6th (North)	
2009	Northeastern State	2–9	2–7 / 2–3	11th / 4th (North)	
2010	Northeastern State	6–5	6–4 / 5–1	5th / 1st (North)	
Northeastern State RiverHawks (Division II Independent) (2011)
2011	Northeastern State	7–5			L Mineral Water Bowl
Northeastern State RiverHawks (Mid-America Intercollegiate Athletics Association) (2012–2013)
2012	Northeastern State	4–6	4–6	10th	
2013	Northeastern State	2–9	2–8	13th	
Northeastern State:		22–42	14–34		
Total:		22–42			
National championship Conference title Conference division title or championship game berth

=== High school ===
Year	Team	Overall	Conference	Standing	Bowl/playoffs
East Central Cardinals () (2014)
2014	East Central	3–6	3–3	5th	
East Central:		3–6	3–3		
Total:		3–6			
