= 1994 Northeastern State Redmen football team =

American college football season

1994 Northeastern State Redmen football

NAIA Division I national champion OIC co-champion

NAIA Football National Championship, W 13–12 at Arkansas–Pine Bluff
- Conference: Oklahoma Intercollegiate Conference
- Record: 11–2 (4–1 OIC)
- Head coach: Tom Eckert (8th season)
- Home stadium: Gable Field

1994 Oklahoma Intercollegiate Conference football standings
	Conf.					Overall
Team	W		L		T	W		L		T
No. 3 Northeastern State +^	4	–	1	–	0	11	–	2	–	0
No. 4 Langston +^	4	–	1	–	0	10	–	3	–	0
No. T–5 SE Oklahoma State +	4	–	1	–	0	8	–	2	–	1
East Central	2	–	3	–	0	3	–	7	–	0
SW Oklahoma State	1	–	4	–	0	2	–	7	–	0
NW Oklahoma State	0	–	5	–	0	1	–	9	–	0
+ – Conference co-champions; ^ – NAIA Division I playoff participant; Rankings from NAIA Division I poll

The 1994 Northeastern State Redmen football team represented Northeastern State University as a member of the Oklahoma Intercollegiate Conference (OIC) during the 1994 NAIA Division I football season. Led by eighth-year head coach Tom Eckert, the Redmen compiled an overall record of 11–2 with a mark of 4–1 in conference play, and finished as OIC co-champion. Northeastern State advanced to the NAIA playoffs and defeated Arkansas–Pine Bluff in the NAIA Football National Championship.

== Schedule ==
Date	Opponent	Site	Result	Attendance	Source
September 10	at Missouri Western*	Spratt Stadium; St. Joseph, MO	L 13–33	2,500	
September 17	at Ouachita Baptist*	A. U. Williams Field; Arkadelphia, AR	W 35–17		
September 24	Arkansas–Monticello*	Gable Field; Tahlequah, OK	W 31–3		
October 1	at Arkansas Tech*	Buerkle Field; Russellville, AR	W 28–9		
October 8	Harding*	Gable Field; Tahlequah, OK	W 27–0	2,400	
October 15	at East Central (OK)	Norris Field; Ada, OK	W 47–0	1,500	
October 22	Southeastern Oklahoma State^{†}	Gable Field; Tahlequah, OK	W 31–13	8,500	
October 29	Langston	Gable Field; Tahlequah, OK	L 33–35	2,500	
November 5	Southwestern Oklahoma State	Gable Field; Tahlequah, OK	W 21–0		
November 12	at Northwestern Oklahoma State	Ranger Field; Alva, OK	W 35–7		
November 19	Moorhead State*	Gable Field; Tahlequah, OK (NAIA Division I Quarterfinal)	W 14–7		
December 3	vs. Langston*	Owasso H.S. Stadium; Owasso, OK (NAIA Division I Semifinal)	W 3–0	6,500	
December 10	vs. Arkansas–Pine Bluff*	Pumphrey Stadium; Pine Bluff, AR (NAIA Division I Championship)	W 13–12		
*Non-conference game; ^{†}Homecoming
