= Jim Frazier (American football) =

American football coach and college athletics administrator

Biographical details
- Born: c. 1941

Coaching career (HC unless noted)

Football
- 1963–1964: Kingman HS (KS) (line)
- 1966: Hastings (assistant)
- 1967–1970: Hastings
- 1971–1985: Missouri Southern

Baseball
- c. 1967: Hastings

Administrative career (AD unless noted)
- 1985–: Missouri Southern

Head coaching record
- Overall: 114–70–5 (football)
- Tournaments: Football; 2–0 (NAIA D-II playoffs)

Accomplishments and honors

Championships
- Football; 1 NAIA Division II (1972); 1 CSIC (1976)

Awards
- Football; NAIA Coach of the Year (1972)

Jim Frazier (born c. 1941) is an American former football coach and college athletics administrator. He served as the head football coach at Hastings College in Hastings, Nebraska from 1967 to 1970 and Missouri Southern State University from 1971 to 1985, compiling a career college football coaching record of 114–70–5. Frazier led the 1972 Missouri Southern Lions football team to an NAIA Division II Football National Championship.

A native of McCune, Kansas, Frazier began his coaching career as line coach for the football team at Kingman High School in Kingman, Kansas for two years, from 1963 to 1964. After earning a master's degree in physical education from Wichita State University, he went to Hastings in 1966 as assistant football coach, head baseball coach, and physical education instructor. Frazier succeeded Dean Pryor as head football coach in 1967.

== Head coaching record ==
=== Football ===
Year	Team	Overall	Conference	Standing	Bowl/playoffs
Hastings Broncos (Nebraska College Conference) (1967–1968)
1967	Hastings	2–8	0–4	5th	
1968	Hastings	3–6	1–3	4th	
Hastings Broncos (Nebraska Intercollegiate Athletic Conference) (1969–1970)
1969	Hastings	2–6	0–2	6th	
1970	Hastings	7–1	4–1	2nd	
Hastings:		14–21	5–10		
Missouri Southern Lions (NAIA Division II independent) (1971–1975)
1971	Missouri Southern	7–3			
1972	Missouri Southern	12–0			W NAIA Division II First Round
1973	Missouri Southern	4–6			
1974	Missouri Southern	6–3			
1975	Missouri Southern	7–3–1			
Missouri Southern Lions (Central States Intercollegiate Conference) (1976–1985)
1976	Missouri Southern	8–2	4–1	T–1st	
1977	Missouri Southern	5–5	2–5	T–5th	
1978	Missouri Southern	6–3–1	4–2–1	T–2nd	
1979	Missouri Southern	5–6	3–4	T–3rd	
1980	Missouri Southern	6–3–1	4–3	T–3rd	
1981	Missouri Southern	6–4–1	5–2	T–2nd	
1982	Missouri Southern	7–2–1	5–1–1	3rd	
1983	Missouri Southern	9–2	5–2	2nd	
1984	Missouri Southern	6–3	5–2	T–2nd	
1985	Missouri Southern	6–4	4–3	3rd	
Missouri Southern:		100–49–5	41–25–2		
Total:		114–70–5			
National championship Conference title Conference division title or championship game berth
