= 1993 East Central Tigers football team =

American college football season

1993 East Central Tigers football

NAIA Division I national champion

NAIA Division I National Championship Game, W 49–35 vs. Glenville State
- Conference: Oklahoma Intercollegiate Conference
- Record: 10–3 (3–2 OIC)
- Head coach: Hank Walbrick (4th season)
- Home stadium: Norris Field

1993 Oklahoma Intercollegiate Conference football standings
	Conf.					Overall
Team	W		L		T	W		L		T
No. 4 Langston $^	4	–	1	–	0	9	–	3	–	0
No. 7 East Central ^	3	–	2	–	0	10	–	3	–	0
No. 15 SE Oklahoma State	3	–	2	–	0	6	–	4	–	0
No. 11 SW Oklahoma State	2	–	3	–	0	6	–	4	–	0
Northeastern State	2	–	3	–	0	5	–	5	–	0
NW Oklahoma State	1	–	4	–	0	3	–	7	–	0
$ – Conference champion; ^ – NAIA Division I playoff participant; Rankings from NAIA Division I poll

The 1993 East Central Tigers football team represented East Central University as a member of the Oklahoma Intercollegiate Conference (OIC) during the 1993 NAIA Division I football season. Led by fourth-year head coach Hank Walbrick, the Tigers compiled an overall record of 10–3 with a mark of 3–2 in conference play, and finished tied for second in the OIC. East Central advanced to the NAIA Division I playoffs, where the Tigers defeated Western New Mexico in the quarterfinals, Arkansas–Monticello in the semifinals, and Glenville State in the championship game.

== Schedule ==
Date	Opponent	Site	Result	Attendance	Source
September 4	at Tarleton State*	Memorial Stadium; Stephenville, TX	L 21–24		
September 11	Harding*	Norris Field; Ada, OK	W 21–20		
September 25	Arkansas Tech*	Norris Field; Ada, OK	W 32–5		
October 2	at Ouachita Baptist*	Cliff Harris Stadium; Arkadelphia, AR	W 27–17		
October 9	Southern Arkansas*	Norris Field; Ada, OK	W 44–36	3,500	
October 16	at Northeastern State	Gable Field; Tahlequah, OK	L 13–14		
October 23	Southwestern Oklahoma State	Norris Field; Ada, OK	W 28–21	2,400	
October 30	Northwestern Oklahoma State	Norris Field; Ada, OK	W 33–27		
November 6	at Langston	Anderson Field; Langston, OK	W 28–25	1,300	
November 13	at Southeastern Oklahoma State	Laird Field; Durant, OK	L 14–28		
November 20	at Western New Mexico*	Silver High Stadium; Silver City, NM (NAIA Division I Quarterfinal)	W 24–22	2,800	
December 4	Arkansas–Monticello*	Norris Field; Ada, OK (NAIA Division I Semifinal)	W 27–0	4,200	
December 11	Glenville State*	Norris Field; Ada, OK (NAIA Division I Championship Game)	W 49–35	5,750	
*Non-conference game
