= Ray Best =

American football player and coach (born 1936)

Biographical details
- Born: October 16, 1936 (age 88)

Playing career
- 1956–1959: Doane
- Position(s): Tackle

Coaching career (HC unless noted)
- 1965–1970: Doane (assistant)
- 1971–1975: Doane

Head coaching record
- Overall: 35–12–3
- Tournaments: 0–1 (NAIA D-II playoffs)

Accomplishments and honors

Championships
- 3 NIAC (1971–1973)

Ray Best (born October 16, 1936) is an American former football coach. He was the 27th as head football coach at Doane College in Crete, Nebraska, serving for five seasons, from 1971 to 1975, and compiling a record of 35–12–3.

== Head coaching record ==
Year	Team	Overall	Conference	Standing	Bowl/playoffs	NAIA^{#}
Doane Tigers (Nebraska Intercollegiate Athletic Conference) (1971–1975)
1971	Doane	6–2–1	4–1	1st		
1972	Doane	10–1	5–0	1st	L NAIA Division II Semifinal	3
1973	Doane	7–2–1	4–0–1	1st		20
1974	Doane	6–3	4–1	2nd		
1975	Doane	6–4–1	3–1–1	2nd		
Doane:		35–12–3	20–3–2			
Total:		35–12–3				
National championship Conference title Conference division title or championship game berth
^{#}Rankings from NAIA Division II poll.
