= 1999 Humboldt State Lumberjacks football team =

American college football season

1999 Humboldt State Lumberjacks football
- Conference: Columbia Football Association
- Record: 3–7 (0–4 CFA)
- Head coach: Fred Whitmire (9th season)
- Home stadium: Redwood Bowl

1999 Columbia Football Association standings
	Conf.			Overall
Team	W		L	W		L
Western Washington $	4	–	0	8	–	3
Western Oregon *	3	–	1	5	–	5
Central Washington	2	–	2	4	–	5
Simon Fraser *	1	–	3	4	–	6
Humboldt State	0	–	4	3	–	7
$ – Conference champion; * – principally classified as NAIA member

The 1999 Humboldt State Lumberjacks football team represented Humboldt State University—now known as California State Polytechnic University, Humboldt—as a member of the Columbia Football Association (CFA) during the 1999 NCAA Division II football season. Led by Fred Whitmire in his ninth and final season as head coach, the Lumberjacks compiled an overall record of 3–7 with a mark of 0–4 in conference play, placing last out five teams in the CFA. The team was outscored its by opponents 320 to 167 for the season. Humboldt State played home games at the Redwood Bowl in Arcata, California.

Whitmire finished his nine-year tenure with the Lumberjacks with a record of 43–49–2 (.468).

== Schedule ==
Date	Opponent	Site	Result	Attendance
September 4	Montana Tech*	Redwood Bowl; Arcata, CA	W 28–14	
September 11	at Saint Mary's*	Saint Mary’s Stadium; Moraga, CA	L 3–40	
September 18	Azusa Pacific*	Redwood Bowl; Arcata, CA	W 38–34	
September 25	at Willamette*	Sweetland Field; Salem, OR	W 9–3	
October 2	at No. 9 UC Davis*	Toomey Field; Davis, CA	L 16–43	8,234
October 9	Central Washington	Redwood Bowl; Arcata, CA	L 7–43	
October 16	Western Oregon	Redwood Bowl; Arcata, CA	L 32–41	
October 23	at Simon Fraser	Thunderbird Stadium; University Endowment Lands, BC	L 20–24	
October 30	Western Washington	Redwood Bowl; Arcata, CA	L 0–58	
November 6	at Southern Oregon*	Fuller Field; Ashland, OR	L 14–20	
*Non-conference game; Rankings from NCAA Division II Football Committee Poll released prior to the game

== Team players in the NFL ==
No Humboldt State players were selected in the 2000 NFL draft. The following finished their college career in 1999, were not drafted, but played in the NFL.

Player	Position	First NFL team
Stephen Cheek	Punter	2004 Kansas City Chiefs
