= Oklahoma Intercollegiate Conference =

The Oklahoma Intercollegiate Conference may refer to:

- Oklahoma Intercollegiate Conference (1914–1928) - A small college football conference from 1914–1928.
- Oklahoma Intercollegiate Conference (1974–1997) - An NAIA conference that existed from 1974–1997.
