= Kenny Evans =

Kenny Evans may refer to:

- Kenny Evans (high jumper), American high jumper
- Kenny Evans (American football), American football coach
