= 1999 NCAA Division II football season =

American college football season

- Regular season: August 28 – November 13, 1999
- Playoffs: November 20 – December 11, 1999
- National Championship: Braly Municipal Stadium; Florence, AL
- Champion: Northwest Missouri State (2nd title)
- Harlon Hill Trophy: Corte McGuffey, Northern Colorado

The 1999 NCAA Division II football season, part of college football in the United States organized by the National Collegiate Athletic Association at the Division II level, began on August 28, 1999, and concluded with the NCAA Division II Football Championship on December 11, 1999, at Braly Municipal Stadium in Florence, Alabama, hosted by the University of North Alabama.

Northwest Missouri State defeated Carson–Newman in the championship game, 58–52 after four overtimes, to win their second Division II national title.

The Harlon Hill Trophy was awarded to Corte McGuffey, quarterback from Northern Colorado.

== Conference changes and new programs ==
=== Conference changes ===
- The Midwest Intercollegiate Football Conference transferred its football sponsorship, and 13 of its 14 members, back to the Great Lakes Intercollegiate Athletic Conference after the two leagues merged prior the season. The MIFC was then dissolved and GLIAC resumed its football championship for the first since 1990.

School	1998 Conference	1999 Conference
Alabama A&M	D-II Independent	SWAC (I-AA)
Albany	Eastern (D-II)	Northeast (I-AA)
Ashland	MIFC	GLIAC
Bryant (Note: Bryant played a partial football schedule in 1998 again I-AA, Division II, and junior college institutions, but neither the school nor NCAA records count the Bulldogs' 1998 games as part of its intercollegiate football history.)	New program	Eastern
Elon	D-II Independent	I-AA Independent
Ferris State	MIFC	GLIAC
Findlay	MIFC	GLIAC
Grand Valley State	MIFC	GLIAC
Hillsdale	MIFC	GLIAC
Indianapolis	MIFC	GLIAC
Mercyhurst	MIFC	GLIAC
Michigan Tech	MIFC	GLIAC
Minnesota Crookston	NDCAC (NAIA)	NSIC
Minnesota Morris	D-II Independent	NSIC
Northern Michigan	MIFC	GLIAC
Northwood	MIFC	GLIAC
Saginaw Valley State	MIFC	GLIAC
Saint Anselm	Program revived	Eastern (D-II)
St. Francis (IL)	MIFC (D-II)	MSFA (NAIA)
Stony Brook	Eastern (D-II)	Northeast (I-AA)
Wayne State	MIFC	GLIAC
Westminster (PA)	MIFC	GLIAC

=== Program changes ===
- After Mankato State University changed its name to Minnesota State University, Mankato in 1999, the Mankato State Mavericks became the Minnesota State–Mankato Mavericks.

== Conference standings ==
1999 Central Intercollegiate Athletic Association football standings
	Conf.			Overall
Team	W		L	W		L
No. 19 Winston-Salem State $	7	–	0	8	–	3
Virginia Union	6	–	1	8	–	2
Virginia State	5	–	2	6	–	4
Bowie State	4	–	3	5	–	4
North Carolina Central	4	–	3	5	–	5
Livingstone	2	–	5	4	–	7
Johnson C. Smith	1	–	6	2	–	9
Elizabeth City State	1	–	6	1	–	10
Fayetteville State	1	–	6	1	–	10
$ – Conference champion; Rankings from NCAA Division II Football Committee poll

1999 Columbia Football Association standings
	Conf.			Overall
Team	W		L	W		L
Western Washington $	4	–	0	8	–	3
Western Oregon *	3	–	1	5	–	5
Central Washington	2	–	2	4	–	5
Simon Fraser *	1	–	3	4	–	6
Humboldt State	0	–	4	3	–	7
$ – Conference champion; * – principally classified as NAIA member

1999 Eastern Football Conference standings
	Conf.			Overall
Team	W		L	W		L
Atlantic Division
C. W. Post xy	7	–	1	9	–	2
Southern Connecticut	6	–	2	7	–	3
Merrimack	6	–	3	7	–	3
Saint Anselm	4	–	4	4	–	5
UMass Lowell	3	–	6	3	–	7
Central Division
American International xy$	8	–	1	10	–	2
Pace	5	–	3	6	–	4
Bryant	4	–	4	5	–	4
Bentley	3	–	6	4	–	7
Assumption	1	–	7	3	–	7
Stonehill	0	–	10	0	–	10
Championship: American International 41, C. W. Post 20
$ – Conference champion; x – Division champion/co-champions; y – Championship game participant

1999 Great Lakes Intercollegiate Athletic Conference football standings
	Conf.			Overall
Team	W		L	W		L
No. 10 Northwood +	7	–	2	8	–	2
Ferris State +	7	–	2	7	–	3
Ashland	7	–	3	7	–	3
Hillsdale	6	–	3	8	–	3
Northern Michigan	6	–	3	6	–	4
Michigan Tech	6	–	4	6	–	4
Indianapolis	5	–	4	7	–	4
Grand Valley State	5	–	4	5	–	5
Mercyhurst	4	–	5	5	–	5
Saginaw Valley State	4	–	5	4	–	6
Westminster (PA)	2	–	8	3	–	8
Findlay	2	–	8	2	–	8
Wayne State (MI)	0	–	10	0	–	11
+ – Conference co-champions; Rankings from NCAA Division II Football Committee poll

1999 Gulf South Conference football standings
	Conf.			Overall
Team	W		L	W		L
Arkansas Tech $^	8	–	1	9	–	3
No. 8 Southern Arkansas	7	–	2	8	–	2
West Georgia	7	–	2	8	–	3
Delta State	6	–	3	6	–	4
North Alabama	5	–	4	5	–	6
Central Arkansas	3	–	6	4	–	6
Arkansas–Monticello *	3	–	6	4	–	7
Valdosta State	3	–	6	4	–	7
Henderson State	2	–	7	2	–	9
West Alabama	1	–	8	1	–	10
$ – Conference champion; ^ – NCAA Division II playoff participant; * – Arkansas–Monticello forfeited 4 wins due to NCAA violations.; Rankings from NCAA Division II Football Committee poll

1999 Lone Star Conference football standings
	Conf.			Overall
Team	W		L	W		L
Overall*
Northeastern State * $^	7	–	2	10	–	4
No. 17 SE Oklahoma State $	6	–	2	7	–	4
No. 18 Central Oklahoma $^	6	–	2	8	–	3
Eastern New Mexico	6	–	3	8	–	3
Angelo State	6	–	3	8	–	3
Texas A&M–Kingsville	5	–	4	5	–	6
Tarleton State	5	–	4	5	–	6
SW Oklahoma State	4	–	5	5	–	5
Abilene Christian	4	–	5	4	–	6
Texas A&M–Commerce	4	–	5	4	–	7
Harding	3	–	5	5	–	5
East Central	3	–	6	3	–	7
Midwestern State	3	–	6	4	–	7
West Texas A&M	2	–	7	3	–	8
Ouachita Baptist	1	–	7	3	–	7
North
Northeastern State † x$^	5	–	1	10	–	4
No. 17 SE Oklahoma State $	4	–	2	7	–	4
No. 18 Central Oklahoma $^	4	–	2	8	–	3
East Central	3	–	3	3	–	7
SW Oklahoma State	3	–	3	5	–	5
Harding	2	–	4	5	–	5
Ouachita Baptist	0	–	6	3	–	7
South
Angelo State x	5	–	2	8	–	3
Texas A&M–Commerce	4	–	3	4	–	7
Texas A&M–Kingsville	4	–	3	5	–	6
Eastern New Mexico	4	–	3	8	–	3
Tarleton State	3	–	4	5	–	6
Abilene Christian	3	–	4	4	–	6
Midwestern State	3	–	4	4	–	7
West Texas A&M	2	–	5	3	–	8
$ – Conference champion; ^ – NCAA Division II playoff participant; * – The LSC counted separate overall and division standings. † – The LSC awarded tri-champions in 1999. (Northeastern State's 7th win resulted from an uneven number of conference games played.); Rankings from NCAA Division II Football Committee poll

1999 Mid-America Intercollegiate Athletics Association football standings
	Conf.			Overall
Team	W		L	W		L
No. 4 NW Missouri State $^	9	–	0	14	–	1
No. 7 Pittsburg State ^	8	–	1	10	–	2
Missouri Western	6	–	3	7	–	4
Central Missouri State	5	–	4	7	–	4
Washburn	4	–	5	6	–	5
Emporia State	4	–	5	5	–	6
Truman State	4	–	5	4	–	7
Missouri Southern	3	–	6	5	–	6
Southwest Baptist	2	–	7	2	–	9
Missouri–Rolla	0	–	9	2	–	9
$ – Conference champion; ^ – NCAA Division II playoff participant; Rankings from NCAA Division II Football Committee poll

1999 North Central Conference football standings
	Conf.			Overall
Team	W		L	W		L
No. 3 Northern Colorado +^	8	–	1	11	–	2
No. 9 North Dakota +^	8	–	1	9	–	2
No. 13 North Dakota State	7	–	2	9	–	2
No. T–15 South Dakota State	6	–	3	8	–	3
Nebraska–Omaha	5	–	4	7	–	4
Augustana (SD)	3	–	6	5	–	6
South Dakota	3	–	6	4	–	7
Minnesota State	2	–	7	4	–	7
Morningside	2	–	7	3	–	8
St. Cloud State	1	–	8	3	–	8
+ – Conference co-champions; ^ – NCAA Division II playoff participant; Rankings from NCAA Division II Football Committee poll

1998 Northern Sun Intercollegiate Conference football standings
	Conf.			Overall
Team	W		L	W		L
Northern State $	8	–	0	9	–	2
Bemidji State	6	–	2	8	–	3
Winona State	6	–	2	7	–	4
Moorhead State	5	–	3	7	–	4
Southwest State (MN)	5	–	3	6	–	5
Minnesota Duluth	3	–	5	3	–	8
Wayne State (NE)	3	–	5	3	–	8
Minnesota–Crookston	2	–	6	3	–	7
Concordia–St. Paul	2	–	6	2	–	7
Minnesota Morris	0	–	8	0	–	11
$ – Conference champion

1999 Pennsylvania State Athletic Conference football standings
	Conf.			Overall
Team	W		L	W		L
East Division
West Chester x	6	–	0	7	–	3
Millersville ^	5	–	1	9	–	3
Bloomsburg	4	–	2	7	–	4
Kutztown	3	–	3	4	–	6
East Stroudsburg	2	–	4	4	–	7
Mansfield	1	–	5	1	–	9
Cheyney	0	–	6	1	–	10
West Division
No. 2 Slippery Rock x^	6	–	0	10	–	2
IUP ^	5	–	1	9	–	4
No. 14 Shippensburg	4	–	2	8	–	3
California (PA)	2	–	4	5	–	6
Clarion	2	–	4	3	–	7
Edinboro	2	–	4	3	–	8
Lock Haven	0	–	6	2	–	9
x – Division champion/co-champions; ^ – NCAA Division II playoff participant; Rankings from NCAA Division II Football Committee poll

1999 Rocky Mountain Athletic Conference football standings
	Conf.			Overall
Team	W		L	W		L
Chadron State +	7	–	1	7	–	3
New Mexico Highlands +	7	–	1	7	–	4
Nebraska–Kearney	6	–	2	7	–	3
Mesa State	4	–	4	6	–	5
Western State (CO)	4	–	4	5	–	6
Adams State	4	–	4	4	–	6
Fort Hays State	2	–	6	2	–	9
Fort Lewis	2	–	6	2	–	9
Colorado Mines	0	–	8	1	–	9
+ – Conference co-champions

1999 South Atlantic Conference football standings
	Conf.			Overall
Team	W		L	W		L
No. 1 Carson–Newman $^	8	–	0	13	–	1
No. 12 Catawba ^	7	–	1	11	–	2
Mars Hill	5	–	3	7	–	4
Gardner–Webb	4	–	7	7	–	4
Presbyterian	4	–	7	7	–	4
Newberry	3	–	5	5	–	6
Lenoir–Rhyne	2	–	6	5	–	6
Wingate	2	–	6	3	–	8
Tusculum	0	–	8	2	–	9
$ – Conference champion; ^ – NCAA Division II playoff participant; Rankings from NCAA Division II Football Committee poll

1999 Southern Intercollegiate Athletic Conference football standings
	Conf.			Overall
Team	W		L	W		L
No. 6 Fort Valley State +^	5	–	1	10	–	2
Tuskegee +	5	–	1	9	–	3
Albany State	4	–	2	7	–	3
Kentucky State	4	–	2	5	–	6
Miles	2	–	4	3	–	7
Lane	2	–	4	2	–	8
Clark Atlanta	1	–	5	3	–	7
Morehouse	1	–	5	2	–	8
Morris Brown	0	–	0	6	–	5
Savannah State	0	–	0	5	–	6
+ – Conference co-champions; ^ – NCAA Division II playoff participant; Rankings from NCAA Division II Football Committee poll

1999 West Virginia Intercollegiate Athletic Conference football standings
	Conf.			Overall
Team	W		L	W		L
No. T–15 Shepherd $^	6	–	0	9	–	2
Fairmont State	5	–	1	8	–	2
West Liberty State	4	–	2	6	–	4
West Virginia State	2	–	4	5	–	5
West Virginia Wesleyan	2	–	4	2	–	8
Concord	1	–	5	3	–	8
West Virginia Tech	1	–	5	1	–	10
Glenville State *		–		6	–	5
$ – Conference champion; ^ – NCAA Division II playoff participant; * – ineligible for conference title; Rankings from NCAA Division II Football Committee poll

1999 NCAA Division II independents football records
	Conf.			Overall
Team	W		L	W		L
No. 5 UC Davis ^		–		10	–	2
Kentucky Wesleyan		–		7	–	4
New Haven		–		5	–	5
Western New Mexico		–		4	–	5
Saint Joseph's (IN)		–		4	–	7
Quincy		–		3	–	8
Gannon		–		1	–	9
Oklahoma Panhandle State		–		1	–	9
^ – NCAA Division II playoff participant; Rankings from NCAA Division II Football Committee poll

== Conference summaries ==
Conference Champions

Central Intercollegiate Athletic Association – Winston-Salem State
Columbia Football Association – Western Washington
Eastern Collegiate Football Conference – American International
Great Lakes Intercollegiate Athletic Conference – Ferris State and Northwood
Gulf South Conference – Arkansas Tech
Lone Star Conference – Central Oklahoma, Northeastern State, and Southeastern Oklahoma State
Mid-America Intercollegiate Athletics Association – Northwest Missouri State
North Central Conference – North Dakota and Northern Colorado
Northern Sun Intercollegiate Conference – Northern State
Pennsylvania State Athletic Conference – West Chester (East), Slippery Rock (West)
Rocky Mountain Athletic Conference – Chadron State and New Mexico Highlands
South Atlantic Conference – Carson-Newman
Southern Intercollegiate Athletic Conference – Fort Valley State and Tuskegee
West Virginia Intercollegiate Athletic Conference – Shepherd

== Postseason ==
1999 NCAA Division II Football Championship
- Teams: 16
- Finals Site: Braly Municipal Stadium; Florence, AL
- Champion: Northwest Missouri State; (2nd title, title game)
- Runner-up: Carson–Newman; (3rd title game)
- Semifinalists: Northeastern State; IUP
- Winning coach: championship

The 1999 NCAA Division II Football Championship playoffs were the 26th single-elimination tournament to determine the national champion of men's NCAA Division II college football. The championship game was held at Braly Municipal Stadium in Florence, Alabama, for the 13th time.

=== Playoff bracket ===
First round Campus sites
Carson–Newman	40
Arkansas Tech	28
Catawba	48
Fort Valley State	17
UC Davis	33
Central Oklahoma	17
Northeastern State	27*
Western Washington	24
IUP	27*
Slippery Rock	20
Millersville	21
Shepherd	14
Northern Colorado	34
Pittsburg State	31
Northwest Missouri State	20*
North Dakota	13

Quarterfinals; Campus sites
Carson–Newman	28
Catawba	25
UC Davis	14
Northeastern State	19
IUP	26
Millersville	21
Northern Colorado	35
Northwest Missouri State	41

Semifinals; Campus sites
Carson–Newman	42
Northeastern State	7
IUP	12
Northwest Missouri State	20

Championship; Braly Municipal Stadium; Florence, AL
Carson–Newman	52
Northwest Missouri State	58****

== See also ==
- 1999 NCAA Division I-A football season
- 1999 NCAA Division I-AA football season
- 1999 NCAA Division III football season
- 1999 NAIA football season
