= 1999 Northwest Missouri State Bearcats football team =

American college football season

1999 Northwest Missouri State Bearcats football

NCAA Division II champion MIAA champion

NCAA Division II Championship Game, W 58–52 ^{4OT} vs. Carson–Newman
- Conference: Mid-America Intercollegiate Athletics Association
- Record: 14–1 (9–0 MIAA)
- Head coach: Mel Tjeerdsma (6th season)
- Defensive coordinator: Scott Bostwick (6th season)
- Home stadium: Bearcat Stadium

1999 Mid-America Intercollegiate Athletics Association football standings
	Conf.			Overall
Team	W		L	W		L
No. 4 NW Missouri State $^	9	–	0	14	–	1
No. 7 Pittsburg State ^	8	–	1	10	–	2
Missouri Western	6	–	3	7	–	4
Central Missouri State	5	–	4	7	–	4
Washburn	4	–	5	6	–	5
Emporia State	4	–	5	5	–	6
Truman State	4	–	5	4	–	7
Missouri Southern	3	–	6	5	–	6
Southwest Baptist	2	–	7	2	–	9
Missouri–Rolla	0	–	9	2	–	9
$ – Conference champion; ^ – NCAA Division II playoff participant; Rankings from NCAA Division II Football Committee poll

The 1999 Northwest Missouri State Bearcats football team was an American football team that won the 1999 NCAA Division II Football Championship.

The team represented Northwest Missouri State University in the Mid-America Intercollegiate Athletics Association (MIAA) during the 1999 NCAA Division II football season. In their sixth season under head coach Mel Tjeerdsma, the Bearcats compiled a 14–1 record (9–0 against conference opponents) and won the MIAA championship.

The team advanced to the NCAA Division II playoffs and won the national championship by defeating Carson–Newman, 58–52, in the championship game.

The team played its home games at Bearcat Stadium in Maryville, Missouri.

== Schedule ==
Date	Opponent	Rank	Site	Result	Attendance	Source
August 28	Arkansas Tech*	No. 1	Bearcat Stadium; Maryville, MO	W 31–14	7,600	
September 4	at No. 9 Nebraska–Omaha*	No. 1	Al F. Caniglia Field; Omaha, NE	L 17–40	11,500	
September 18	at No. 10 Pittsburg State	No. 1	Carnie Smith Stadium; Pittsburg, KS	W 27–21	9,116	
September 25	Southwest Baptist	No. 9	Bearcat Stadium; Maryville, MO	W 52–0	7,750	
October 2	Truman State	No. 8	Bearcat Stadium; Maryville, MO	W 42–32	7,350	
October 9	at Missouri Western	No. 7	Spratt Stadium; St. Joseph, MO	W 38–34	3,968	
October 16	Missouri Southern	No. 7	Bearcat Stadium; Maryville, MO	W 52–13	8,250	
October 23	at Emporia State	No. 7	Welch Stadium; Emporia, KS	W 59–28	6,259	
October 30	Washburn	No. 5	Bearcat Stadium; Maryville, MO	W 35–10	6,500	
November 6	at Missouri–Rolla	No. 5	Allgood–Bailey Stadium; Rolla, MO	W 34–13	700	
November 13	Central Missouri State	No. 4	Bearcat Stadium; Maryville, MO	W 41–14	7,500	
November 20	No. 9 North Dakota*	No. 4	Bearcat Stadium; Maryville, MO (NCAA Division II first round)	W 20–13 ^{OT}	7,750	
November 27	No. 3 Northern Colorado*	No. 4	Bearcat Stadium; Maryville, MO (NCAA Division II quarterfinal)	W 41–35	6,124	
December 4	IUP*	No. 4	Bearcat Stadium; Maryville, MO (NCAA Division II seminfinal)	W 20–12	8,100	
December 11	vs. No. 1 Carson–Newman*	No. 4	Braly Municipal Stadium; Florence, AL (NCAA Division II Championship Game)	W 58–52 ^{4OT}	8,451	
*Non-conference game; Rankings from NCAA Division II Football Committee Poll released prior to the game
