= Melvin Brown (American football) =

American football player and coach (1932–2018)

Biographical details
- Born: March 5, 1932; Hagerman, Texas, U.S.
- Died: September 13, 2018 (aged 86); Dallas, Texas, U.S.

Playing career
- 1950–1953: Oklahoma

Coaching career (HC unless noted)
- 1957–1961: Southeastern State (OK)
- 1962–1977: Houston (assistant)
- 1978–1981: Sam Houston State

Head coaching record
- Overall: 28–57–1

Accomplishments and honors

Awards
- LSC Coach of the Year (1978)

Melvin Ray Brown (March 5, 1932 – September 13, 2018) was an American college football player and coach. He played at the University of Oklahoma under head coach Bud Wilkinson. Brown was the head football coach at Southeastern State College—now known as Southeastern Oklahoma State University—from 1957 to 1961 and Sam Houston State University from 1978 to 1981.

== Head coaching record ==
Year	Team	Overall	Conference	Standing	Bowl/playoffs
Southeastern State Savages (Oklahoma Collegiate Conference) (1957–1961)
1957	Southeastern State	4–4	2–2	T–4th	
1958	Southeastern State	3–5	2–4	T–5th	
1959	Southeastern State	0–9	0–6	7th	
1960	Southeastern State	5–4–1	3–3	T–4th	
1961	Southeastern State	4–6	2–4	T–5th	
Southeastern State:		16–28–1	9–19		
Sam Houston State Bearkats (Lone Star Conference) (1978–1981)
1978	Sam Houston State	6–5	4–3	T–3rd	
1979	Sam Houston State	1–9	0–7	8th	
1980	Sam Houston State	3–7	2–5	6th	
1981	Sam Houston State	2–8	2–5	6th	
Sam Houston State:		12–29	8–20		
Total:		28–57–1			
