= 1980 Elon Fightin' Christians football team =

American college football season

1980 Elon Fightin' Christians football

NAIA Division I national champion SAC co-champion

NAIA Division I Championship Game, W 17–10 vs. Northeastern State
- Conference: South Atlantic Conference
- Record: 13–1 (6–1 SAC)
- Head coach: Jerry Tolley (4th season)

1980 South Atlantic Conference football standings
	Conf.					Overall
Team	W		L		T	W		L		T
No. 5 Elon +^	6	–	1	–	0	13	–	1	–	0
No. 6 Mars Hill +^	6	–	1	–	0	8	–	2	–	1
Carson–Newman	5	–	2	–	0	7	–	3	–	0
Presbyterian	3	–	4	–	0	4	–	6	–	0
Lenoir–Rhyne	3	–	4	–	0	4	–	7	–	0
Newberry	3	–	4	–	0	3	–	6	–	0
Gardner–Webb	2	–	5	–	0	3	–	7	–	0
Catawba	0	–	7	–	0	1	–	9	–	0
+ – Conference co-champions; ^ – NAIA Division I playoff participant; Rankings from NAIA Division I poll

The 1980 Elon Fightin' Christians football team was an American football team that represented Elon University of Elon, North Carolina, as a member of the South Atlantic Conference (SAC) during the 1980 NAIA Division I football season. In their fourth year under head coach Jerry Tolley, the Christians compiled a 13–1 record (6–1 against SAC opponents) and tied for the SAC championship.

The team lost the second game of the season at Mars Hill, but then won the remaining 12 games of the season. The team advanced to the NAIA Division I playoffs, defeating Concord (17–14) in the quarterfinals, East Texas State (14–6) in the semifinals, and Northeastern State (17–10) in the national championship game.

Running back Bobby Hedrick rushed for 1,394 yards in the regular season – 1,793 yards with three post-season games included. He set Elon's all-time rushing record with 5,603 rushing yards in four years. He was also a first-team pick on the 1980 Little All-America college football team.

Tight end Joey Hackett went on to play in the NFL. John Bangley was the quarterback.

== Schedule ==
Date	Opponent	Site	Result	Attendance	Source
September 6	at Winston-Salem State*	Winston-Salem, NC	W 27–22		
September 13	at Mars Hill	Mars Hill, NC	L 11–23		
September 20	Delta State	Burlington Memorial Football Stadium; Burlington, NC	W 24–21		
September 27	at North Carolina Central*	Durham, NC	W 23–14		
October 11	Norfolk State*	Burlington Memorial Football Stadium; Burlington, NC	W 65–26		
October 18	Presbyterian	Burlington Memorial Football Stadium; Burlington, NC	W 28–26		
October 25	at Catawba	Salisbury, NC	W 14–10		
November 1	at Gardner–Webb	Boiling Springs, NC	W 37–3	2,000	
November 8	Newberry	Burlington Memorial Football Stadium; Burlington, NC	W 31–0		
November 15	at Lenoir–Rhyne	Hickory, NC	W 27–12		
November 22	Carson–Newman	Burlington Memorial Football Stadium; Burlington, NC	W 38–12		
December 6	at Concord*	Bluefield, WV	W 17–14	4,000	
December 13	at East Texas State*	Memorial Stadium; Commerce, TX	W 14–6	2,578	
December 20	Northeastern State*	Burlington Memorial Football Stadium; Burlington, NC	W 17–10	6,128	
*Non-conference game
