= 1980 East Texas State Lions football team =

American college football season

1980 East Texas State Lions football

NAIA Division Semifinal, L 6–14 vs. Elon
- Conference: Lone Star Conference
- Record: 8–3–1 (4–2–1 LSC)
- Head coach: Ernest Hawkins (17th season)
- Offensive scheme: Option
- Defensive coordinator: Bobby Fox (10th season)
- Base defense: 5–2
- Home stadium: Memorial Stadium

1980 Lone Star Conference football standings
	Conf.					Overall
Team	W		L		T	W		L		T
Southwest Texas State $	6	–	1	–	0	8	–	3	–	0
No. 2 Angelo State ^	5	–	1	–	1	8	–	2	–	1
Texas A&I	5	–	2	–	0	7	–	4	–	0
No. 8 East Texas State ^	4	–	2	–	1	8	–	3	–	1
Stephen F. Austin	4	–	3	–	0	4	–	6	–	0
Sam Houston State	2	–	5	–	0	3	–	7	–	0
Abilene Christian	1	–	6	–	0	2	–	8	–	0
Howard Payne	0	–	7	–	0	1	–	8	–	1
$ – Conference champion; ^ – NAIA Division I playoff participant; Rankings from NAIA Division I poll

The 1980 East Texas State Lions football team represented East Texas State University—now known as Texas A&M University–Commerce—as a member of the Lone Star Conference (LSC) during the 1980 NAIA Division I football season. Led by 17th-year head coach Ernest Hawkins, the Lions compiled an overall record of 8–3–1 with a mark of 4–2–1 in conference play, placing fourth in the LSC. Two of the conference's members competed at the NCAA Division II level, while the rest remained in the National Association of Intercollegiate Athletics (NAIA). Despite Southwest Texas State, an NCAA Division II member, winning the conference title, the NAIA division title was shared by East Texas State and Angelo State. The Lions advanced to the NAIA Division I Football National Championship playoffs, where they beat Central Arkansas in the quarterfinals before falling to Elon, the eventual national champion, in the semifinals.

East Texas State began the season 6–0 before dropping consecutive games to Southwest Texas State and Texas A&I. The Lions finished third in the NAIA poll. The team played its home games at Memorial Stadium in Commerce, Texas.

== Schedule ==
Date	Time	Opponent	Rank	Site	Result	Attendance	Source
September 13	2:00 pm	at Cameron*		Cameron Stadium; Lawton, OK	W 35–20		
September 20	6:00 pm	Southern Arkansas*		Memorial Stadium; Commerce, TX	W 21–14		
September 27	5:00 pm	at Central State (OK)*		Wantland Stadium; Edmond, OK	W 33–7		
October 11	6:00 pm	at Sam Houston State		Pritchett Field; Huntsville, TX	W 41–7		
October 18	2:00 pm	Howard Payne		Memorial Stadium; Commerce, TX	W 28–14		
October 25	2:00 pm	at Abilene Christian		Shotwell Stadium; Abilene, TX	W 24–14		
November 1	2:00 pm	No. 2 Southwest Texas State	No. 9	Memorial Stadium; Commerce, TX	L 26–37	5,500	
November 8	2:00 pm	No. 7 Texas A&I	No. 10	Memorial Stadium; Commerce, TX (rivalry)	L 7–14		
November 15	6:00 pm	at Stephen F. Austin	No. 8	Lumberjack Stadium; Nacogdoches, TX	W 44–7		
November 22	2:00 pm	No. 6 Angelo State	No. 7	Memorial Stadium; Commerce, TX	T 13–13		
December 6	2:00 pm	at No. 1 Central Arkansas*	No. 8	Estes Stadium; Conway, AR (NAIA Division I Quarterfinal)	W 27–21		
December 13	3:00 pm	No. 2 Elon*	No. 6	Memorial Stadium; Commerce, TX (NAIA Division I Semifinal)	L 6–14	2,578	
*Non-conference game; Rankings from NAIA Division I Poll released prior to the game; All times are in Central time

== Postseason awards ==
=== All-Americans ===
- Wade Wilson, Quarterback, Consensus First Team
- Danny Kirk, Linebacker, Second Team

=== LSC superlatives ===
- Wade Wilson, Outstanding Back of the Year

=== All-Lone Star Conference ===
==== LSC First Team ====
- Danny Kirk, Linebacker
- Cary Noiel, Running Back
- Curtis Ray, Defensive Line
- Ron Trammell, Wide Receiver
- Wade Wilson, Quarterback

==== LSC Second Team ====
- Jimmy Buster, Defensive Lineman
- Blake Cooper, Center
- Anthony Freeman, Defensive Back
- David Midolo, Tackle
- Randy Smith, Receiver
- Darren Smith, Defensive Back

=== LSC Honorable Mention ===
- Vic Combs, Tight End
- Dennis Hagen, Guard
- David Lowe, Defensive End
- Bishop Spencer, Tackle
