= 1980 Sam Houston State Bearkats football team =

American college football season

1980 Sam Houston State Bearkats football
- Conference: Lone Star Conference
- Record: 3–7 (2–5 LSC)
- Head coach: Melvin Brown (3rd season)
- Home stadium: Pritchett Field

1980 Lone Star Conference football standings
	Conf.					Overall
Team	W		L		T	W		L		T
Southwest Texas State $	6	–	1	–	0	8	–	3	–	0
No. 2 Angelo State ^	5	–	1	–	1	8	–	2	–	1
Texas A&I	5	–	2	–	0	7	–	4	–	0
No. 8 East Texas State ^	4	–	2	–	1	8	–	3	–	1
Stephen F. Austin	4	–	3	–	0	4	–	6	–	0
Sam Houston State	2	–	5	–	0	3	–	7	–	0
Abilene Christian	1	–	6	–	0	2	–	8	–	0
Howard Payne	0	–	7	–	0	1	–	8	–	1
$ – Conference champion; ^ – NAIA Division I playoff participant; Rankings from NAIA Division I poll

The 1980 Sam Houston State Bearkats football team represented Sam Houston State University as a member of the Lone Star Conference (LSC) during the 1980 NAIA Division I football season. Led by third-year head coach Melvin Brown, the Bearkats compiled an overall record of 3–7 with a mark of 2–5 in conference play, and finished sixth in the LSC.

== Schedule ==
Date	Opponent	Site	Result	Source
September 23	Nuevo León*	Pritchett Field; Huntsville, TX	W 26–12	
September 27	at Southwestern Oklahoma State*	Milam Stadium; Weatherford, OK	L 9–14	
October 4	at Texas Lutheran*	Matador Stadium; Seguin, TX	L 7–17	
October 11	East Texas State	Pritchett Field; Huntsville, TX	L 7–41	
October 18	Southwest Texas State	Pritchett Field; Huntsville, TX (rivalry)	L 7–55	
October 25	at Texas A&I	Javelina Stadium; Kingsville, TX	L 20–42	
November 1	Howard Payne	Pritchett Field; Huntsville, TX	W 23–14	
November 8	at Abilene Christian	Shotwell Stadium; Abilene, TX	W 17–14	
November 15	at Angelo State	San Angelo Stadium; San Angelo, TX	L 7–34	
November 22	Stephen F. Austin	Pritchett Field; Huntsville, TX (rivalry)	L 6–23	
*Non-conference game
