= 1999 NCAA Division II football rankings =

The 1999 NCAA Division II football rankings are from the NCAA Division II football committee. This is for the 1999 season.

== Legend ==
	Increase in ranking
	Decrease in ranking
	Not ranked previous week
(#–#)	Win–loss record
(Italics)	Number of first place votes
т	Tied with team above or below also with this symbol

== NCAA Division II Football Committee poll ==
	Preseason	Week 1 Sept 21	Week 2 Sept 28	Week 3 Oct 5	Week 4 Oct 12	Week 5 Oct 19	Week 6 Oct 26	Week 7 Nov 2	Week 8 Nov 9	
1.	Northwest Missouri State	Carson–Newman (3–0)	Carson–Newman (4–0)	Carson–Newman (5–0)	Carson–Newman (6–0)	Carson–Newman (7–0)	Carson–Newman (8–0)	Carson–Newman (9–0)	Carson–Newman (10–0)	1.
2.	Carson–Newman	Northern Colorado (3–0)	Northern Colorado (4–0)	Northern Colorado (5–0)	Northern Colorado (6–0)	Central Oklahoma (6–0)	Central Oklahoma (7–0)	Central Oklahoma (8–0)	Slippery Rock (9–1)	2.
3.	Texas A&M–Kingsville	Central Oklahoma (2–0)	Central Oklahoma (3–0)	Central Oklahoma (4–0)	Central Oklahoma (5–0)	Slippery Rock (6–1)	Slippery Rock (7–1)	Slippery Rock (8–1)	Northern Colorado (9–1)	3.
4.	Slippery Rock	Slippery Rock (2–1)	Slippery Rock (3–1)	Slippery Rock (4–1)	Slippery Rock (5–1)	North Dakota (6–0)	Northern Colorado (7–1)	Northern Colorado (8–1)	Northwest Missouri State (9–1)	4.
5.	Northern Colorado	Nebraska–Omaha (3–0)	Nebraska–Omaha (4–0)	Nebraska–Omaha (5–0)	Nebraska–Omaha (5–1) т	Northern Colorado (6–1)	Northwest Missouri State (7–1)	Northwest Missouri State (8–1)	UC Davis (8–1)	5.
6.	Central Oklahoma	Tuskegee (3–0)	Tuskegee (3–0)	Tuskegee (4–0)	Tuskegee (5–0) т	Nebraska–Omaha (6–1)	UC Davis (7–1)	UC Davis (7–1)	Fort Valley State (10–0)	6.
7.	Albany State	Eastern New Mexico (3–0) т	Eastern New Mexico (4–0)	Northwest Missouri State (4–1)	Northwest Missouri State (5–1)	Northwest Missouri State (6–1)	Fort Valley State (8–0)	Fort Valley State (9–0)	Pittsburg State (9–1)	7.
8.	Grand Valley State	New Haven (3–0) т	Northwest Missouri State (3–1)	UC Davis (4–1)	UC Davis (5–1)	UC Davis (6–1)	Pittsburg State (7–1)	Pittsburg State (8–1)	Southern Arkansas (8–1)	8.
9.	Nebraska–Omaha	Northwest Missouri State (2–1)	UC Davis (3–1)	Fort Valley State (5–0)	Fort Valley State (6–0)	Fort Valley State (7–0)	Southern Arkansas (6–1)	Southern Arkansas (7–1)	North Dakota (8–1)	9.
10.	Pittsburg State	UC Davis (2–1)	Fort Valley State (5–0)	IUP (3–1)	Pittsburg State (5–1)	Pittsburg State (6–1)	North Dakota (6–1)	North Dakota (7–1)	Northwood (8–1)	10.
11.	UC Davis	Fort Valley State (4–0)	North Dakota State (4–0)	Pittsburg State (4–1)	North Dakota (5–0)	Southern Arkansas (5–1)	North Dakota State (7–1)	North Dakota State (8–1)	Western Washington (8–1)	11.
12.	Southern Arkansas	North Dakota State (3–0)	IUP (2–1)	Michigan Tech (4–0)	Southern Arkansas (4–1)	North Dakota State (6–1) т	Angelo State (6–2)	Angelo State (7–2)	Catawba (9–1)	12.
13.	Shepherd	IUP (1–1)	Pittsburg State (3–1)	North Dakota (4–0)	North Dakota State (5–1)	New Haven (4–2) т	West Georgia (6–2)	West Georgia (7–2)	North Dakota State (8–2)	13.
14.	Western State (CO)	West Georgia (2–1)	Michigan Tech (3–0)	Eastern New Mexico (4–1)	New Haven (4–2)	Millersville (5–1)	Northwood (6–1)	Northwood (7–1)	Shippensburg (8–2)	14.
15.	West Georgia	Northeastern State (2–1)	North Dakota (3–0)	Southern Arkansas (4–1)	Millersville (4–1)	Chadron State (5–1) т	Southeastern Oklahoma State (6–2) т	Hillsdale (7–1)	Shepherd (8–1) т	15.
16.	North Dakota State	Pittsburg State (2–1)	Southern Arkansas (3–1)	North Dakota State (4–1)	Chadron State (4–1) т	Delta State (5–1) т	South Dakota State (6–2) т	Nebraska–Omaha (7–2)	South Dakota State (7–3) т	16.
17.	Millersville	Michigan Tech (3–0)	New Haven (3–1)	New Haven (3–2)	Delta State (4–1) т	Angelo State (5–2)	Hillsdale (7–1)	Catawba (8–1)	Southeastern Oklahoma State (7–3) т	17.
18.	Angelo State	North Dakota (2–0)	Millersville (2–1)	Millersville (3–1)	Angelo State (4–2)	Tuskegee (5–1)	Nebraska–Omaha (6–2)	Western Washington (7–1)	Central Oklahoma (8–1)	18.
19.	North Dakota	Southern Arkansas (2–1)	Western State (CO) (2–2)	Delta State (3–1)	IUP (3–2)	Shippensburg (6–1)	Ashland (7–1)	Shippensburg (7–2)	Winston–Salem State (7–2)	19.
20.	IUP (Note: In the actual printed polls, IUP was listed as Indiana (PA))	Millersville (1–1) т	Delta State (2–1)	Chadron State (3–1)	West Georgia (4–2)	West Georgia (5–2)	Catawba (7–1)	South Dakota State (6–3)	Northwestern State (OK) (7–3)	20.
21.		Western State (CO) (1–2) т								21.
	Preseason	Week 1 Sept 21	Week 2 Sept 28	Week 3 Oct 5	Week 4 Oct 12	Week 5 Oct 19	Week 6 Oct 26	Week 7 Nov 2	Week 8 Nov 9	
		Dropped: 3 Texas A&M–Kingsville; 7 Albany State; 8 Grand Valley State; 13 Shepherd; 18 Angelo State	Dropped: 14 West Georgia; 15 Northeastern State	Dropped: 19 Western State (CO)	Dropped: 12 Michigan Tech; 14 Eastern New Mexico	Dropped: 19 IUP	Dropped: 13 New Haven; 14 Millersville; 15 Chadron State; 16 Delta State; 18 Tuskegee; 19 Shippensburg	Dropped: 15 Southeastern Oklahoma State; 19 Ashland	Dropped: 12 Angelo State; 13 West Georgia; 15 Hillsdale; 16 Nebraska–Omaha	
