= Jon Lantz =

American football player and coach (1952–2007)

Biographical details
- Born: October 2, 1952; Pawnee City, Nebraska, U.S.
- Died: March 3, 2007 (aged 54); Joplin, Missouri, U.S.

Playing career
- 1971–1973: Oklahoma Panhandle

Coaching career (HC unless noted)
- 1974–1979: Oklahoma Panhandle (assistant)
- 1980–1985: Edmond Memorial HS (OK)
- 1986–1988: Southeastern Oklahoma State
- 1989–1997: Missouri Southern

Head coaching record
- Overall: 71–45–3 (college)
- Tournaments: 1–1 (NAIA D-I playoffs); 0–1 (NCAA D-II playoffs)

Accomplishments and honors

Championships
- 1 OIC (1988); 1 MIAA (1993)

Awards
- NAIA Division I Coach of the Year (1988)

Jon R. Lantz (October 2, 1952 – March 3, 2007) was an American football coach. He served as the head football coach at Southeastern Oklahoma State University from 1986 to 1988 and Missouri Southern State University from 1989 to 1997, compiling a career college football coaching record of 71–45–3.

== Head coaching record ==
=== College ===
Year	Team	Overall	Conference	Standing	Bowl/playoffs
Southeastern Oklahoma State Savages (Oklahoma Intercollegiate Conference) (1986–1988)
1986	Southeastern Oklahoma State	6–4			
1987	Southeastern Oklahoma State	4–5–2			
1988	Southeastern Oklahoma State	10–1	4–0	1st	L NAIA Division I Quarterfinal
Southeastern Oklahoma State:		20–10–2			
Missouri Southern Lions (Missouri/Mid-America Intercollegiate Athletic Association) (1989–1997)
1989	Missouri Southern	6–4	6–4	4th	
1990	Missouri Southern	4–5	4–5	T–5th	
1991	Missouri Southern	8–3	7–2	2nd	
1992	Missouri Southern	4–6	3–6	7th	
1993	Missouri Southern	9–1–1	9–0	1st	L NCAA Division II First Round
1994	Missouri Southern	5–5	5–4	5th	
1995	Missouri Southern	6–4	5–4	5th	
1996	Missouri Southern	6–4	5–4	T–4th	
1997	Missouri Southern	3–3 (Note: Lantz resigned after the first six games of the 1997 season, before the start of conference play. Rob Green was appointed interim head coach and led Missouri Southern for the final four games of the season. The Lions finished 7–3 overall and 6–3 in Mid-America Intercollegiate Athletics Association play, tying for third place.)	2–3		
Missouri Southern:		51–35–1	46–32		
Total:		71–45–3			
National championship Conference title Conference division title or championship game berth
