= 1972 Missouri Southern Lions football team =

American college football season

1972 Missouri Southern Lions football

NAIA Division II national champion

NAIA Division II Football National Championship, W 21–14 vs. Northwestern (IA)
- Conference: Independent
- Record: 12–0
- Head coach: Jim Frazier (2nd season)

1972 NAIA Division II independents football records
	Conf.			Overall
Team	W	L	T	W		L		T
No. 1 Missouri Southern ^		–		12	–	0	–	0
No. 12 Geneva		–		8	–	1	–	0
No. 7 Westminster (PA)		–		7	–	1	–	0
No. 4 Franklin (IN) ^		–		8	–	3	–	0
Cal Lutheran		–		5	–	5	–	0
Simon Fraser		–		4	–	5	–	0
Eureka		–		2	–	5	–	1
Missouri Western		–		3	–	7	–	0
Texas Lutheran		–		3	–	7	–	0
Iowa Wesleyan		–		2	–	6	–	1
Azusa Pacific		–		2	–	7	–	0
Georgetown (KY)		–		2	–	7	–	0
Austin		–		1	–	8	–	0
Waynesburg		–		1	–	8	–	0
Grove City		–		0	–	8	–	0
Oklahoma Panhandle State		–		0	–	11	–	0
^ – NAIA Division II playoff participant; Rankings from NAIA Division II poll

The 1972 Missouri Southern Lions football team represented Missouri Southern State College during the 1972 NAIA Division II football season, and completed the 6th season of Lion football at the senior college level. The Lions played their home games in Joplin, Missouri. The 1972 team came off a 4–6 record from the prior season. The 1972 team was headed by coach Jim Frazier. The team finished the regular season with an undefeated 10–0 record and made the program's first appearance in the NAIA playoffs. They won their first NAIA Division II Football National Championship with a 21–14 win over Northwestern College.

== Schedule ==
Date	Opponent	Site	Result	Attendance
September 9	at Fort Hays State	Lewis Field Stadium; Hays, KS	W 40–15	
September 16	Southeast Missouri State	Joplin, MO	W 7–6	
September 23	at College of Emporia	Emporia, KS	W 33–7	
September 30	Missouri–Rolla	Joplin, MO	W 39–7	
October 7	at UNLV	Las Vegas Stadium; Whitney, NV	W 7–0	5,124
October 14	Pittsburg State	Joplin, MO	W 21–6	
October 21	at Washburn	Moore Bowl; Topeka, KS	W 14–3	
October 28	Emporia State	Joplin, MO	W 14–9	
November 4	Missouri Western	Joplin, MO	W 52–7	
November 11	Culver–Stockton	Joplin, MO	W 63–12	
November 25	Doane	Joplin, MO (NAIA Division II Semifinal)	W 24–6	
December 2	Northwestern (IA)	Joplin, MO (NAIA Division II Championship)	W 21–14	
