= 1980 Southwest Texas State Bobcats football team =

American college football season

1980 Southwest Texas State Bobcats football

LSC champion
- Conference: Lone Star Conference
- Record: 8–3 (6–1 LSC)
- Head coach: Jim Wacker (2nd season)
- Defensive coordinator: Bob Brush (4th season)
- Home stadium: Evans Field

1980 Lone Star Conference football standings
	Conf.					Overall
Team	W		L		T	W		L		T
Southwest Texas State $	6	–	1	–	0	8	–	3	–	0
No. 2 Angelo State ^	5	–	1	–	1	8	–	2	–	1
Texas A&I	5	–	2	–	0	7	–	4	–	0
No. 8 East Texas State ^	4	–	2	–	1	8	–	3	–	1
Stephen F. Austin	4	–	3	–	0	4	–	6	–	0
Sam Houston State	2	–	5	–	0	3	–	7	–	0
Abilene Christian	1	–	6	–	0	2	–	8	–	0
Howard Payne	0	–	7	–	0	1	–	8	–	1
$ – Conference champion; ^ – NAIA Division I playoff participant; Rankings from NAIA Division I poll

The 1980 Southwest Texas State Bobcats football team was an American football team that represented Southwest Texas State University (now known as Texas State University) during the 1980 NCAA Division II football season as a member of the Lone Star Conference (LSC). In their second year under head coach Jim Wacker, the team compiled an overall record of 8–3, with a mark of 6–1 in conference play, and finished as LSC champion.

== Schedule ==
Date	Opponent	Rank	Site	Result	Attendance	Source
September 6	vs. Prairie View A&M*		Alamo Stadium; San Antonio, TX	W 49–0	3,200	
September 13	Texas Lutheran*		Evans Field; San Marcos, TX	W 38–0	8,000	
September 27	at West Texas State*	No. 5	Kimbrough Memorial Stadium; Canyon, TX	L 13–21	10,500	
October 4	at Nicholls State*	No. 5	John L. Guidry Stadium; Thibodaux, LA (rivalry)	L 21–24	4,425–5,000	
October 11	Howard Payne		Evans Field; San Marcos, TX	W 35–8	7,000	
October 18	at Sam Houston State		Pritchett Field; Huntsville, TX (rivalry)	W 55–7	2,000	
October 25	Stephen F. Austin		Evans Field; San Marcos, TX	W 34–20	6,700	
November 1	at East Texas State		Memorial Stadium; Commerce, TX	W 37–26	5,500	
November 8	Angelo State		Evans Field; San Marcos, TX	W 18–15	10,000	
November 15	Abilene Christian	No. 10	Evans Field; San Marcos, TX	W 42–2	2,500	
November 22	at Texas A&I	No. 9	Javelina Stadium; Kingsville, TX	L 14–17	5,500	
*Non-conference game; Rankings from AP Poll released prior to the game
