= 1999 UC Davis Aggies football team =

American college football season

1999 UC Davis Aggies football

NCAA Division II Quarterfinal, L 14–19 vs. Northeastern State
- Conference: Independent
- Record: 10–2
- Head coach: Bob Biggs (7th season)
- Offensive coordinator: Mike Moroski (7th season)
- Home stadium: Toomey Field

1999 NCAA Division II independents football records
	Conf.			Overall
Team	W		L	W		L
No. 5 UC Davis ^		–		10	–	2
Kentucky Wesleyan		–		7	–	4
New Haven		–		5	–	5
Western New Mexico		–		4	–	5
Saint Joseph's (IN)		–		4	–	7
Quincy		–		3	–	8
Gannon		–		1	–	9
Oklahoma Panhandle State		–		1	–	9
^ – NCAA Division II playoff participant; Rankings from NCAA Division II Football Committee poll

The 1999 UC Davis football team represented the University of California, Davis as an independent during the 1999 NCAA Division II football season. Led by seventh-year head coach Bob Biggs, UC Davis compiled an overall record of 10–2. 1999 was the 30th consecutive winning season for the Aggies. UC Davis was ranked No. 5 in the NCAA Division II poll at the end of the regular season and advanced to the NCAA Division II Football Championship playoffs for the fourth straight year. The Aggies defeated 18th-ranked Central Oklahoma in the first round before falling to Northeastern State in the quarterfinals. The team outscored its opponents 393 to 233 for the season. The Aggies played home games at Toomey Field in Davis, California.

== Schedule ==
Date	Opponent	Rank	Site	Result	Attendance	Source
September 4	Texas A&M–Commerce	No. 11	Toomey Field; Davis, CA	W 36–0	5,328	
September 11	at Western Oregon	No. 11	McArthur Field; Monmouth, OR	W 40–33 ^{OT}	2,215	
September 18	at Sacramento State	No. 11	Charles C. Hughes Stadium; Sacramento, CA (Causeway Classic)	L 27–48	20,993	
September 25	at New Haven	No. 10	Robert B. Dodds Stadium; West Haven, CT	W 42–16	3,123	
October 2	Humboldt State	No. 9	Toomey Field; Davis, CA	W 43–16	8,234	
October 9	at Southern Utah	No. 8	Eccles Coliseum; Cedar City, UT	W 24–9	4,125	
October 16	at Saint Mary's	No. 8	Saint Mary's Stadium; Moraga, CA	W 28–14	2,418	
October 23	Cal Poly	No. 8	Toomey Field; Davis, CA (rivalry)	W 31–24	9,225	
November 6	Central Washington	No. 6	Toomey Field; Davis, CA	W 20–13	5,300	
November 13	No. 11 Western Washington	No. 5	Toomey Field; Davis, CA	W 55–24	6,349	
November 20	No. 18 Central Oklahoma	No. 5	Toomey Field; Davis, CA (NCAA Division II First Round)	W 33–17	4,440	
November 27	Northeastern State	No. 5	Toomey Field; Davis, CA (NCAA Division II Quarterfinal)	L 14–19	5,650	
Rankings from NCAA Division II Football Committee Poll released prior to the game
