= 1994 NAIA Division I football season =

American college football season

- Regular season: August–November 1994
- Postseason: November 19–December 10, 1994
- National Championship: Pine Bluff, AR
- Champions: Northeastern State (2)

The 1994 NAIA Division I football season was the 39th season of college football sponsored by the NAIA, was the 25th season of play of the NAIA's top division for football.

The season was played from August to November 1994 and culminated in the 1994 NAIA Champion Bowl playoffs and the 1994 NAIA Champion Bowl, played this year on December 10, 1994 in Pine Bluff, Arkansas, on the campus of the University of Arkansas–Pine Bluff.

Northeastern State defeated Arkansas–Pine Bluff in the Champion Bowl, 13–12, to win their second NAIA national title and first since 1958.

== Conference standings ==
1994 Arkansas Intercollegiate Conference football standings
	Conf.					Overall
Team	W		L		T	W		L		T
No. 8 Arkansas Tech $^	4	–	0	–	0	7	–	4	–	0
No. 14 Harding	3	–	1	–	0	5	–	4	–	1
Arkansas–Monticello	2	–	2	–	0	4	–	4	–	1
Ouachita Baptist	1	–	3	–	0	5	–	5	–	0
Southern Arkansas	0	–	4	–	0	1	–	7	–	1
+ – Conference co-champions; ^ – NAIA Division I playoff participant; Rankings from NAIA Division I poll

1994 Oklahoma Intercollegiate Conference football standings
	Conf.					Overall
Team	W		L		T	W		L		T
No. 3 Northeastern State +^	4	–	1	–	0	11	–	2	–	0
No. 4 Langston +^	4	–	1	–	0	10	–	3	–	0
No. T–5 SE Oklahoma State +	4	–	1	–	0	8	–	2	–	1
East Central	2	–	3	–	0	3	–	7	–	0
SW Oklahoma State	1	–	4	–	0	2	–	7	–	0
NW Oklahoma State	0	–	5	–	0	1	–	9	–	0
+ – Conference co-champions; ^ – NAIA Division I playoff participant; Rankings from NAIA Division I poll

1994 Frontier Conference football standings
	Conf.					Overall
Team	W		L		T	W		L		T
No. 7 Western Montana $^	6	–	0	–	0	8	–	3	–	0
Montana Tech	4	–	2	–	0	5	–	5	–	0
Carroll (MT)	2	–	4	–	0	4	–	5	–	0
Rocky Mountain	0	–	6	–	0	0	–	10	–	0
$ – Conference champion; ^ – NAIA Division I playoff participant; Rankings from NAIA Division I poll

1994 West Virginia Intercollegiate Athletic Conference football standings
	Conf.					Overall
Team	W		L		T	W		L		T
No. 2 Glenville State +^	5	–	1	–	0	8	–	3	–	0
No. 10 Shepherd +	5	–	1	–	0	6	–	4	–	0
No. 11 West Liberty State	4	–	2	–	0	7	–	3	–	0
No. 12 West Virginia Wesleyan	4	–	2	–	0	7	–	3	–	0
Fairmont State	2	–	4	–	0	3	–	7	–	0
West Virginia Tech	1	–	5	–	0	1	–	9	–	0
Concord	0	–	6	–	0	1	–	9	–	0
+ – Conference co-champions; ^ – NAIA Division I playoff participant; Rankings from NAIA Division I poll

1994 Northern Sun Intercollegiate Conference football standings
	Conf.					Overall
Team	W		L		T	W		L		T
Winona State $	5	–	0	–	1	7	–	3	–	1
No. 5 Moorhead State ^	4	–	1	–	1	7	–	3	–	1
Northern State	4	–	2	–	0	5	–	6	–	0
Southwest State (MN)	3	–	3	–	0	4	–	6	–	0
Minnesota Duluth	3	–	3	–	0	4	–	7	–	0
Bemidji State	1	–	5	–	0	1	–	8	–	0
Minnesota Morris	0	–	6	–	0	1	–	9	–	0
$ – Conference champion; ^ – NAIA Division I playoff participant; Rankings from NAIA Division I poll

1994 NAIA Division I independents football records
	Conf.			Overall
Team	W	L	T	W		L		T
No. 1 Central State (OH) ^		–		8	–	2	–	0
No. 13 Iowa Wesleyan		–		8	–	3	–	0
No. 9 Arkansas–Pine Bluff ^		–		9	–	4	–	0
No. 15 Western New Mexico		–		4	–	4	–	0
Westmar		–		4	–	5	–	0
^ – NAIA Division I playoff participant; Rankings from NAIA Division I poll

== Conference champions ==
Conference	Champion	Record
Frontier	Montana Western	6–0
Oklahoma	Northeastern State; Langston	4–1

== Postseason ==
Quarterfinals; November 19, 1994; Campus sites
Langston	56
Arkansas Tech*	42
Moorhead State	7
Northeastern State*	14
Glenville State	38
Montana Western*	48
Central State (OH)	14
Arkansas–Pine Bluff*	21

Semifinals; December 3, 1994; Campus sites
Langston	0
Northeastern State*	3
Montana Western	53
Arkansas–Pine Bluff* (OT)	60

1994 Champion Bowl; December 10, 1994; Pine Bluff, AR
Northeastern State	13
Arkansas–Pine Bluff*	12

== See also ==
- 1994 NCAA Division I-A football season
- 1994 NCAA Division I-AA football season
- 1994 NCAA Division II football season
- 1994 NCAA Division III football season
