= 1993 NAIA Division I football season =

American college football season

- Regular season: August–November 1993
- Postseason: November 20–December 11, 1993
- National Championship: Norris Field; Ada, OK
- Champions: East Central

The 1993 NAIA Division I football season was the 38th season of college football sponsored by the NAIA, was the 24th season of play of the NAIA's top division for football.

The season was played from August to November 1993 and culminated in the 1993 NAIA Champion Bowl playoffs and the 1993 NAIA Champion Bowl, played this year on December 11, 1993, at Norris Field in Ada, Oklahoma, on the campus of East Central University.

East Central defeated Glenville State in the Champion Bowl, 49–35, to win their first NAIA national title.

== Conference and membership changes ==
=== Conference changes ===
- This is the final season that the NAIA official recognizes a conference champion in football from the Arkansas Intercollegiate Conference, Northern Sun Intercollegiate Conference, and West Virginia Intercollegiate Athletic Conference. The Northern Sun and WVIAC would transition to the NCAA Division II level, while the AIC's membership would eventually be lost to two existing Division II leagues.

=== Membership changes ===
Team	1992 conference	1993 conference
Central Arkansas	Arkansas (NAIA)	Gulf South (NCAA D-II)
Henderson State	Arkansas (NAIA)	Gulf South (NCAA D-II)

== Conference standings ==
1993 Arkansas Intercollegiate Conference football standings
	Conf.					Overall
Team	W		L		T	W		L		T
No. 5 Arkansas–Monticello $^	4	–	0	–	0	8	–	4	–	0
No. 10 Southern Arkansas	3	–	1	–	0	6	–	4	–	0
No. 13 Harding	2	–	2	–	0	6	–	4	–	0
Arkansas Tech	1	–	3	–	0	1	–	9	–	0
Ouachita Baptist	0	–	4	–	0	3	–	7	–	0
+ – Conference co-champions; ^ – NAIA Division I playoff participant; Rankings from NAIA Division I poll

1993 Oklahoma Intercollegiate Conference football standings
	Conf.					Overall
Team	W		L		T	W		L		T
No. 4 Langston $^	4	–	1	–	0	9	–	3	–	0
No. 7 East Central ^	3	–	2	–	0	10	–	3	–	0
No. 15 SE Oklahoma State	3	–	2	–	0	6	–	4	–	0
No. 11 SW Oklahoma State	2	–	3	–	0	6	–	4	–	0
Northeastern State	2	–	3	–	0	5	–	5	–	0
NW Oklahoma State	1	–	4	–	0	3	–	7	–	0
$ – Conference champion; ^ – NAIA Division I playoff participant; Rankings from NAIA Division I poll

1993 Frontier Conference football standings
	Conf.					Overall
Team	W		L		T	W		L		T
No. 5 Carroll (MT) +^	5	–	1	–	0	8	–	2	–	0
Western Montana +	5	–	1	–	0	5	–	4	–	0
Montana Tech	2	–	4	–	0	5	–	4	–	0
Rocky Mountain	0	–	6	–	0	1	–	9	–	0
+ – Conference co-champions; ^ – NAIA Division I playoff participant; Rankings from NAIA Division I poll

1993 West Virginia Intercollegiate Athletic Conference football standings
	Conf.					Overall
Team	W		L		T	W		L		T
No. 2 Glenville State $^	6	–	1	–	0	10	–	3	–	0
No. 9 West Virginia Wesleyan	5	–	2	–	0	7	–	3	–	0
Shepherd	5	–	2	–	0	5	–	5	–	0
West Liberty State	5	–	2	–	0	5	–	5	–	0
Concord	4	–	3	–	0	4	–	6	–	0
Fairmont State	2	–	5	–	0	3	–	7	–	0
West Virginia State	1	–	6	–	0	1	–	9	–	0
West Virginia Tech	0	–	7	–	0	0	–	10	–	0
$ – Conference champion; ^ – NAIA Division I playoff participant; Rankings from NAIA Division I poll

1993 Northern Sun Intercollegiate Conference football standings
	Conf.					Overall
Team	W		L		T	W		L		T
No. 8 Winona State $^	5	–	1	–	0	7	–	4	–	0
Minnesota Duluth	4	–	2	–	0	8	–	3	–	0
No. 14 Moorhead State	4	–	2	–	0	6	–	4	–	0
Northern State	4	–	2	–	0	6	–	5	–	0
Southwest State (MN)	3	–	3	–	0	4	–	6	–	0
Minnesota Morris	1	–	5	–	0	2	–	9	–	0
Bemidji State	0	–	6	–	0	0	–	10	–	0
$ – Conference champion; ^ – NAIA Division I playoff participant; Rankings from NAIA Division I poll

1993 NAIA Division I independents football records
	Conf.			Overall
Team	W	L	T	W		L		T
No. 1 Central State (OH) ^		–		8	–	1	–	2
No. 12 Iowa Wesleyan		–		8	–	3	–	0
No. 3 Western New Mexico		–		7	–	3	–	0
Arkansas–Pine Bluff		–		5	–	6	–	0
Westmar		–		4	–	6	–	0
^ – NAIA Division I playoff participant; Rankings from NAIA Division I poll

== Conference champions ==
Conference	Champion	Record
Arkansas Intercollegiate	Arkansas–Monticello	4–0
Frontier	Carroll (MT); Montana Western	5–1
Northern Sun	Winona State	5–1
Oklahoma	Langston	4–1
WVIAC	Glenville State	6–1

== Postseason ==
Quarterfinals; November 20, 1993; Campus sites
Central State (OH)	58
Winona State*	7
Glenville State	41
Carroll (MT)*	24
Langston	13
Arkansas–Monticello*	26
East Central	24
Western New Mexico*	22

Semifinals; December 4, 1993; Campus sites
Central State (OH)	12
Glenville State*	13
Arkansas–Monticello	0
East Central*	27

1992 Champion Bowl; December 11, 1993; Ada, OK
Glenville State	35
East Central*	49

== See also ==
- 1993 NCAA Division I-A football season
- 1993 NCAA Division I-AA football season
- 1993 NCAA Division II football season
- 1993 NCAA Division III football season
