= 1972 NAIA Division II football season =

American college football season

- Regular season: August–November 1972
- Postseason: November 25–December 9, 1972
- National Championship: Joplin, MO
- Champions: Missouri Southern

The 1972 NAIA Division II football season was the 17th season of college football sponsored by the NAIA and the third season of play of the NAIA's lower division for football.

The season was played from August to November 1972 and culminated in the 1972 NAIA Division II Football National Championship, played on December 9, 1972, in Joplin, Missouri on the campus of Missouri Southern State College.

The Missouri Southern Lions defeated the Northwestern Red Raiders in the championship game, 21–14, to win their first NAIA national title. As of 2015, this was the earliest championship to feature a team that remains a NAIA member.

== Conference standings ==
1972 College Conference of Illinois and Wisconsin football standings
	Conf.					Overall
Team	W		L		T	W		L		T
No. 6 Carthage $	7	–	1	–	0	8	–	1	–	0
No. 16 Millikin	6	–	2	–	0	7	–	2	–	0
Augustana (IL)	5	–	3	–	0	6	–	3	–	0
Carroll (WI)	5	–	3	–	0	6	–	3	–	0
Elmhurst	5	–	3	–	0	6	–	3	–	0
Illinois Wesleyan	4	–	4	–	0	4	–	5	–	0
North Park	2	–	5	–	1	2	–	6	–	1
Wheaton (IL)	1	–	7	–	0	1	–	8	–	0
North Central (IL)	0	–	7	–	1	0	–	7	–	2
$ – Conference champion; Rankings from NAIA Division II poll

1972 Frontier Conference football standings
	Conf.					Overall
Team	W		L		T	W		L		T
Montana Tech +	3	–	1	–	0	6	–	3	–	0
Carroll (MT) +	3	–	1	–	0	4	–	3	–	0
Western Montana	2	–	2	–	0	3	–	5	–	0
Rocky Mountain	1	–	3	–	0	2	–	6	–	0
Eastern Montana	1	–	3	–	0	2	–	7	–	0
+ – Conference co-champions

1972 Gateway Conference football standings
	Conf.					Overall
Team	W		L		T	W		L		T
Northwestern (WI) +	1	–	0	–	2	4	–	2	–	2
Northland +	1	–	0	–	2	3	–	3	–	2
Lakeland	1	–	1	–	1	4	–	5	–	1
Milton	0	–	2	–	1	4	–	5	–	1
$ – Conference champion

1972 Heart of America Athletic Conference football standings
	Conf.					Overall
Team	W		L		T	W		L		T
No. 11 Ottawa $	6	–	1	–	0	9	–	1	–	0
No. T–18 Missouri Valley	5	–	2	–	0	8	–	2	–	0
No. T–18 Graceland	5	–	2	–	0	7	–	2	–	0
Central Methodist	5	–	2	–	0	7	–	3	–	0
William Jewell	4	–	3	–	0	6	–	5	–	0
Tarkio	2	–	5	–	0	2	–	7	–	0
College of Emporia	1	–	6	–	0	2	–	8	–	0
Baker	0	–	7	–	0	0	–	9	–	0
$ – Conference champion; Rankings from NAIA Division II poll

1972 Hoosier–Buckeye Conference football standings
	Conf.					Overall
Team	W		L		T	W		L		T
Bluffton $	5	–	2	–	0	5	–	4	–	0
Findlay	4	–	2	–	1	5	–	3	–	1
Manchester (IN)	4	–	3	–	0	5	–	5	–	0
Wilmington (OH)	4	–	3	–	0	5	–	4	–	0
Taylor	3	–	2	–	2	3	–	4	–	2
Defiance	3	–	4	–	0	5	–	4	–	0
Anderson (IN)	2	–	4	–	1	4	–	4	–	1
Hanover	2	–	5	–	0	4	–	5	–	0
Earlham	1	–	6	–	0	2	–	8	–	0
$ – Conference champion

1972 Iowa Conference football standings
	Conf.					Overall
Team	W		L		T	W		L		T
No. 5 William Penn +	6	–	1	–	0	10	–	1	–	0
No. T–14 Buena Vista +	6	–	1	–	0	7	–	2	–	0
Central (IA)	5	–	2	–	0	6	–	3	–	0
Dubuque	3	–	3	–	1	5	–	4	–	1
Luther	3	–	4	–	0	3	–	6	–	0
Simpson (IA)	1	–	4	–	2	2	–	5	–	2
Upper Iowa	1	–	5	–	1	4	–	5	–	1
Wartburg	1	–	6	–	0	3	–	6	–	0
+ – Conference co-champions; Rankings from NAIA Division II poll

1972 Kansas Collegiate Athletic Conference football standings
	Conf.					Overall
Team	W		L		T	W		L		T
Friends $	6	–	1	–	1	6	–	3	–	1
Sterling	5	–	2	–	1	5	–	3	–	1
St. Mary of the Plains	5	–	3	–	0	5	–	4	–	0
Bethany (KS)	4	–	3	–	1	4	–	4	–	1
Southwestern (KS)	4	–	4	–	0	4	–	5	–	0
Kansas Wesleyan	3	–	4	–	1	3	–	5	–	1
Tabor	3	–	5	–	0	3	–	6	–	0
Bethel (KS)	3	–	5	–	0	3	–	7	–	0
McPherson	1	–	7	–	0	1	–	9	–	0
$ – Conference champion

1972 Michigan Intercollegiate Athletic Association football standings
	Conf.					Overall
Team	W		L		T	W		L		T
No. 8 Alma +	4	–	1	–	0	8	–	1	–	0
Adrian +	4	–	1	–	0	5	–	4	–	0
Hope	3	–	1	–	1	6	–	2	–	1
Olivet	2	–	3	–	0	3	–	6	–	0
Kalamazoo	1	–	3	–	1	2	–	5	–	1
Albion	0	–	5	–	0	2	–	7	–	0
+ – Conference co-champions; Rankings from NAIA Division II poll

1972 Midwest Conference football standings
	Conf.					Overall
Team	W		L		T	W		L		T
Monmouth (IL) $	8	–	0	–	0	9	–	0	–	0
Cornell (IA)	6	–	2	–	0	6	–	3	–	0
Knox	5	–	3	–	0	6	–	3	–	0
St. Olaf	5	–	3	–	0	6	–	3	–	0
Ripon	5	–	3	–	0	5	–	3	–	0
Coe	5	–	3	–	0	5	–	4	–	0
Carleton	3	–	5	–	0	3	–	5	–	0
Lawrence	1	–	6	–	1	1	–	6	–	1
Grinnell	1	–	7	–	0	2	–	7	–	0
Beloit	0	–	7	–	1	0	–	8	–	1
$ – Conference champion

1972 Minnesota Intercollegiate Athletic Conference football standings
	Conf.					Overall
Team	W		L		T	W		L		T
Gustavus Adolphus $	6	–	1	–	0	6	–	4	–	0
No. 14 Saint John's (MN)	5	–	2	–	0	7	–	2	–	0
Concordia–Moorhead	4	–	3	–	0	6	–	3	–	0
Minnesota–Duluth	4	–	3	–	0	5	–	4	–	0
St. Thomas (MN)	3	–	4	–	0	6	–	4	–	0
Augsburg	3	–	4	–	0	5	–	4	–	0
Hamline	3	–	4	–	0	5	–	4	–	0
Macalester	0	–	7	–	0	0	–	9	–	0
$ – Conference champion; Rankings from NAIA Division I poll

1972 Nebraska Intercollegiate Athletic Conference football standings
	Conf.					Overall
Team	W		L		T	W		L		T
No. 3 Doane $^	5	–	0	–	0	10	–	1	–	0
Concordia (NE)	4	–	1	–	0	7	–	2	–	0
Midland	3	–	2	–	0	7	–	2	–	0
Nebraska Wesleyan	2	–	3	–	0	4	–	5	–	0
Hastings	1	–	4	–	0	3	–	6	–	0
Dana	0	–	5	–	0	2	–	6	–	0
$ – Conference champion; ^ – NAIA Division II playoff participant; Rankings from NAIA Division II poll

1972 North Dakota College Athletic Conference football standings
	Conf.					Overall
Team	W		L		T	W		L		T
Minot State +	4	–	1	–	0	6	–	3	–	0
Valley City State +	4	–	1	–	0	5	–	4	–	0
Wahpeton Science	3	–	2	–	0	6	–	2	–	1
Jamestown	3	–	2	–	0	5	–	4	–	0
Dickinson State	1	–	4	–	0	2	–	7	–	0
Mayville State	0	–	5	–	0	1	–	7	–	0
+ – Conference co-champions

1972 Northwest Conference football standings
	Conf.					Overall
Team	W		L		T	W		L		T
Linfield $	6	–	0	–	0	6	–	3	–	0
No. 8 Pacific (OR)	5	–	1	–	0	8	–	1	–	0
Pacific Lutheran	4	–	2	–	0	6	–	3	–	0
Lewis & Clark	2	–	3	–	0	3	–	6	–	0
Willamette	2	–	4	–	0	3	–	6	–	0
College of Idaho	1	–	5	–	0	3	–	6	–	0
Whitman	0	–	5	–	0	0	–	8	–	0
Whitworth *			–			7	–	2	–	0
$ – Conference champion; * Played only two conference games, ineligible for championship; Rankings from NAIA Division II poll

1972 South Dakota Intercollegiate Conference football standings
	Conf.					Overall
Team	W		L		T	W		L		T
Northern State $	6	–	0	–	0	8	–	2	–	0
Huron	4	–	2	–	0	6	–	3	–	0
Dakota State	3	–	3	–	0	4	–	5	–	0
Dakota Wesleyan	3	–	3	–	0	3	–	6	–	0
South Dakota Tech	3	–	3	–	0	3	–	6	–	0
South Dakota–Springfield	2	–	4	–	0	3	–	6	–	0
Black Hills State	0	–	6	–	0	1	–	9	–	0
$ – Conference champion

1972 Southern California Intercollegiate Athletic Conference football standings
	Conf.					Overall
Team	W		L		T	W		L		T
No. 17 Whittier $	5	–	0	–	0	7	–	2	–	1
Redlands	4	–	1	–	0	5	–	5	–	0
La Verne	3	–	2	–	0	6	–	3	–	0
Claremont-Mudd	1	–	4	–	0	3	–	6	–	0
Occidental	1	–	4	–	0	2	–	7	–	0
Pomona-Pitzer	1	–	4	–	0	2	–	7	–	0
$ – Conference champion; Rankings from NAIA Division II poll

1972 Tri-State Conference football standings
	Conf.					Overall
Team	W		L		T	W		L		T
No. 2 Northwestern (IA) $^	5	–	0	–	0	10	–	1	–	0
Westmar	4	–	1	–	0	5	–	4	–	0
Concordia (MN)	2	–	3	–	0	4	–	4	–	0
Bethel (MN)	2	–	3	–	0	3	–	6	–	0
Sioux Falls	1	–	4	–	0	5	–	4	–	0
Yankton	1	–	4	–	0	2	–	7	–	0
$ – Conference champion; ^ – NAIA Division II playoff participant; Rankings from NAIA Division II poll

1972 NAIA Division II independents football records
	Conf.			Overall
Team	W	L	T	W		L		T
No. 1 Missouri Southern ^		–		12	–	0	–	0
No. 12 Geneva		–		8	–	1	–	0
No. 7 Westminster (PA)		–		7	–	1	–	0
No. 4 Franklin (IN) ^		–		8	–	3	–	0
Cal Lutheran		–		5	–	5	–	0
Simon Fraser		–		4	–	5	–	0
Eureka		–		2	–	5	–	1
Missouri Western		–		3	–	7	–	0
Texas Lutheran		–		3	–	7	–	0
Iowa Wesleyan		–		2	–	6	–	1
Azusa Pacific		–		2	–	7	–	0
Georgetown (KY)		–		2	–	7	–	0
Austin		–		1	–	8	–	0
Waynesburg		–		1	–	8	–	0
Grove City		–		0	–	8	–	0
Oklahoma Panhandle State		–		0	–	11	–	0
^ – NAIA Division II playoff participant; Rankings from NAIA Division II poll

== Postseason ==
Semifinals; November 25, 1972
Doane	6
Missouri Southern*	24
Northwestern (IA)	13
Franklin (IN)*	6

Championship; December 9, 1972; Joplin, MO
Missouri Southern*	21
Northwestern (IA)	14

== See also ==
- 1972 NAIA Division I football season
- 1972 NCAA University Division football season
- 1972 NCAA College Division football season
