= Northeastern State RiverHawks football =

- First season: 1909; 117 years ago
- Athletic director: John Sisemore
- Head coach: Darrin Chiaverini; 2nd season, 11–12 (.478)
- Location: Tahlequah, Oklahoma
- Stadium: Doc Wadley Stadium (capacity: 8,300)
- Field: Gable Field
- NCAA division: Division II
- Conference: Independent
- Colors: Green and white
- All-time record: 477–455–32 (.511)

NAIA national championships
- NAIA: 1958 NAIA Division I: 1994

Conference championships
- 21
- Rivalries: Central Oklahoma (rivalry)
- Fight song: "Northeastern, Northeastern"
- Mascot: Rowdy the RiverHawk
- Marching band: RiverHawk Marching Band
- Outfitter: Nike
- Website: www.goriverhawksgo.com

The Northeastern State RiverHawks football program represents Northeastern State University, located in Tahlequah, Oklahoma, in NCAA Division II college football. Under prior university names and nicknames, the team was previously known as the Northeastern State Redmen.

In 2012, Northeastern State became an all-sports member of the Mid-America Intercollegiate Athletics Association (MIAA), but its football program became an independent in August 2024. NSU's home games are played at Doc Wadley Stadium in Tahlequah, Oklahoma.

Northeastern's football program dates back to 1909. The RiverHawks claim twenty-one conference championships, and appeared in four NAIA football championships in 1958, 1980, 1994, and 1995. The RiverHawks has also appeared twice in the NCAA Division II playoffs, being in 1999 (when it reached the national semifinals) and 2000.

The team is currently coached by Darrin Chiaverini, who began his tenure in 2024.

== Conference affiliations ==
- 1914–1928: Oklahoma Intercollegiate Conference I
- 1929–1973: Oklahoma Collegiate Conference
- 1974–1996: Oklahoma Intercollegiate Conference II
- 1997–2010: Lone Star Conference
- 2011: NCAA Division II independent
- 2012–2023: Mid-America Intercollegiate Athletics Association
- 2024–present: NCAA Division II independent

== Championships ==
=== National championship seasons ===
Season	Coach	Selectors	Record	Bowl
1958	Harold Stratton	NAIA Playoffs	11–0	Won NAIA Championship
1994	Tom Eckert	NAIA Playoffs	11–2	Won NAIA Championship
National Championships			2	

- Conference championships (21)

== Postseason appearances ==
=== NCAA Division II ===
The RiverHawks have made two appearances in the NCAA Division II playoffs, with a combined record of 2–2.

Year	Round	Opponent	Result
1999	First Round; Quarterfinals; Semifinals	Western Washington; UC Davis; Carson–Newman	W, 27–24 ^{OT} W, 19–14; L, 7–42
2000	First Round	Mesa State	L, 21–40

=== NAIA ===
The RiverHawks have made nine appearances in the NAIA playoffs, with a combined record of 9–7 and two national championships.

Year	Round	Opponent	Result
1958	Semifinals; National Championship	St. Benedict's (KS); Arizona State–Flagstaff	W, 19–14; W, 19–13
1980	Quarterfinals; Semifinals; National Championship	Angelo State; Kearney State; Elon	W, 10–3; W, 14–0; L, 10–17
1982	Quarterfinals; Semifinals	Ouachita Baptist; Central State (OK)	W, 38–23; L, 17–28
1983	Quarterfinals	Central Arkansas	L, 7–18
1987	First Round	Pittsburg State	L, 0–57
1990	Quarterfinals	Central Arkansas	L, 14–26
1991	Quarterfinals	Central Arkansas	L, 14–30
1994	Quarterfinals; Semifinals; National Championship	Moorhead State; Langston; Arkansas–Pine Bluff	W, 14–7; W, 3–0; W, 13–12
1995	Semifinals; National Championship	Arkansas–Pine Bluff; Central State (OH)	W, 17–14; L, 7–37

== Former players ==
The program has had 14 NFL Draft selections, most recently Michael Bowie, an offensive lineman selected by the Seattle Seahawks in the seventh round in 2013. The program's highest draft pick was Rosie Manning, chosen 42nd overall in the second round of the 1972 NFL draft.

Former NSU defensive back JoJo Polk played professionally following his graduation in 2000. In his rookie season of arena football, he tripped over a fallen receiver and slammed headfirst into the padded wall at the edge of the field. The impact broke his C-6 vertebra, leaving him unable to move his legs and temporarily without feeling in his hands. He was told that he would not be able to walk again but was nevertheless able to recover and play football again. Polk went on to play eight seasons in the Arena Football League and was named the 2001 Most Inspirational Player of the Year.

== Stadium ==
The Riverhawks have played their home games at Doc Wadley Stadium since 1964. The current capacity of the stadium is at 8,300.

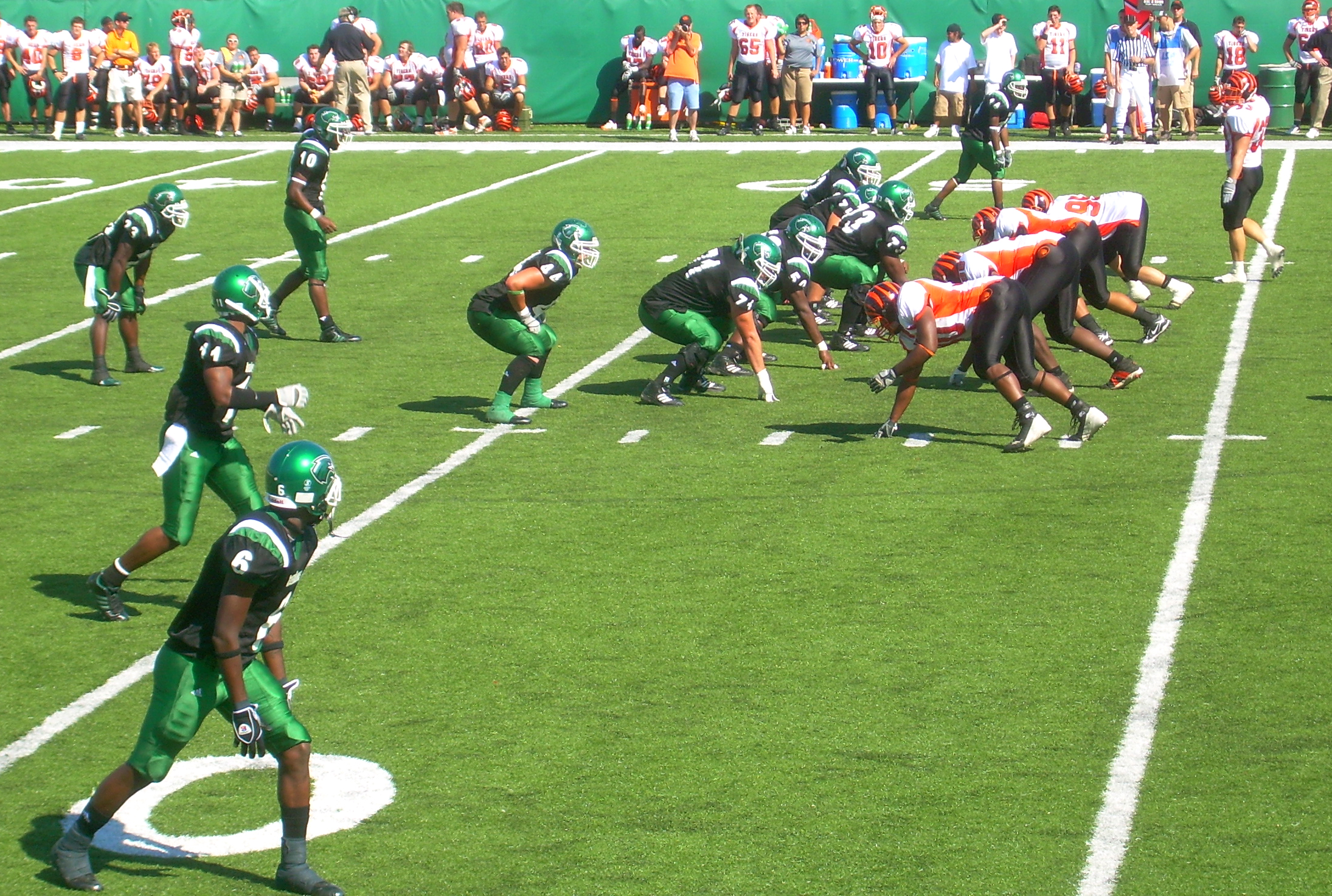
Northeastern State homecoming game, 2007
