= East Central Tigers football =

- First season: 1909; 117 years ago
- Head coach: John Litrenta; 3rd season, 14–20 (.412)
- Location: Ada, Oklahoma
- Stadium: Koi Ishto Stadium (capacity: 5,000)
- Field: Norris Field
- NCAA division: Division II
- Conference: Great American Conference
- Colors: Black and orange

NAIA national championships
- NAIA Division I: 1993
- Mascot: Tigers
- Website: ECU Tigers Football

The East Central Tigers football team represents East Central University, located in Ada, Oklahoma, in NCAA Division II college football. Under previous university names, the team was also known as the East Central State Tigers.

The Tigers, who began playing football in 1909, compete as members of the Great American Conference.

East Central have won one national championship.

== History ==
=== Conference affiliations ===
- ?–1928: Oklahoma Intercollegiate Conference (1914–1928)
- 1929–1973: Oklahoma Collegiate Conference
- 1974–1996: Oklahoma Intercollegiate Conference (1974–1997)
- 1997–2011: Lone Star Conference
- 2012–present: Great American Conference

== Championships ==
=== National championships ===
Year	Association	Division	Head coach	Record	Opponent	Result
1993	NAIA (1)	Division I (1)	Hank Walbrick	10–3 (3–2 OIC)	Glenville State	W, 49–35

== Postseason appearances ==
=== NAIA playoffs ===
The Tigers have made two appearances in the NAIA playoffs, with a combined record of 3–1 and one national championship.

Year	Round	Opponent	Result
1984	Quarterfinals	Central Washington	L, 20–22
1993	Quarterfinals; Semifinals; National Championship	Western New Mexico; Arkansas–Monticello; Glenville State	W, 24–22; W, 27–0; W, 49–35
