= Missouri Southern Lions football =

Intercollegiate American football team for Missouri Southern State University

- First season: 1968; 58 years ago
- Athletic director: Rob Mallory
- Location: Joplin, Missouri
- Stadium: Fred G. Hughes Stadium (capacity: 7,000)
- NCAA division: Division II
- Conference: The MIAA
- Colors: Green and gold
- All-time record: 231–270–7 (.462)

NAIA national championships
- NAIA Division II: 1972

Conference championships
- 1976, 1993
- Rivalries: Pittsburg State Missouri Western, and University of Central Missouri
- Fight song: Southern Fight Song
- Mascot: Roary the Lion
- Marching band: Lion Pride Marching Band
- Outfitter: Nike
- Website: www.mssulions.com

The Missouri Southern Lions football program is the intercollegiate American football team for Missouri Southern State University located in the U.S. state of Missouri. The team competes in the NCAA Division II and are members of the Mid-America Intercollegiate Athletics Association. The team plays its home games at the 7,000 seat Fred G. Hughes Stadium in Joplin, Missouri. Atiba Bradley was named the 14th head football coach in the history of Missouri Southern on February 5, 2021.

== History ==
The Lions football program began in 1968. Their first head coach was Jim Johnson. Under coach Jim Frazier the Lions won the 1972 NAIA Division II football championship.

== Conferences ==
From its inaugural season in 1968 until 1975, Missouri Southern played as an independent program. In 1976, it joined the Central States Intercollegiate Conference in which the school won one conference championships before leaving to play as an NCAA Division II member of the Missouri Intercollegiate Athletic Association (later renamed Mid-America Intercollegiate Athletics Association) in 1989, where the Lions have since remained a member and have won one conference championship.

== Championships ==
=== National championship seasons ===
Season	Coach	Selectors	Record	Bowl
1972	Jim Frazier	NAIA Division II Playoffs	12–0	Won NAIA Division II Championship
National Championships			1	

=== Conference championship seasons ===
Year	Conference	Coach	Overall record	Conference record
1976†	Central States Intercollegiate Conference	Jim Frazier	8–2	4–1
1993	Mid-America Intercollegiate Athletics Association	Jon Lantz	9–1–1	9–0
Total Conference championships:			2	
† Denotes co-champions

== Playoff appearances ==
=== NCAA Division II ===
Missouri Southern has made one appearance in the NCAA Division II playoffs, with a combined record of 0-1.

Year	Round	Opponent	Result
1993	First Round	Mankato State	L, 13–34

=== NAIA Division II playoffs ===
Missouri Southern made one appearance in the NAIA playoffs, with a total record of 2–0.

Year	Round	Opponent	Result
1972	Semifinals; National Championship	Doane; Northwestern (IA)	W, 24–6; W, 21–14

== All-time record vs. current MIAA teams ==
Official record (including any NCAA imposed vacates and forfeits) against all current MIAA opponents as of the end of the 2015 season:

Opponent	Won	Lost	Tied	Percentage	Streak	First Meeting
Central Missouri	15	22	2	.410	Lost 4	1973
Central Oklahoma	2	4	0	.333	Lost 4	2012
Emporia State	21	22	4	.489	Lost 6	1970
Fort Hays State	1	5	0	.167	Lost 5	2012
Lindenwood	1	4	0	.200	Lost 3	2012
Missouri Western	22	26	0	.458	Lost 5	1970
Nebraska–Kearney	8	9	0	.471	Lost 1	1977
Northeastern State	7	14	0	.333	Lost 2	1968
Northwest Missouri State	4	25	0	.138	Lost 23	1989
Pittsburg State	10	39	1	.210	Lost 4	1968
Washburn	20	25	1	.446	Lost 3	1970
Totals	123	205	5	.377		

== Notable former players ==
=== Retired numbers ===
The Lions has retired only one number.

Missouri Southern Lions retired numbers
No.	Player	Pos.	Tenure
9	Rod Smith	WR	1988–1993

Additionally, Smith was inducted into the College Football Hall of Fame in 2009.

=== Other players ===
- James Thrash, former wide receiver for the Washington Redskins and Philadelphia Eagles.
- Richard Jordan, former linebacker for the Detroit Lions.
- Allen Barbre, former guard for the Denver Broncos, Philadelphia Eagles, Seattle Seahawks, Miami Dolphins and Green Bay Packers.
- Brandon Williams, current free agent defensive tackle who has played for the Baltimore Ravens and Kansas City Chiefs.
