= Oklahoma Intercollegiate Conference (1974–1997) =

The Oklahoma Intercollegiate Conference was an NAIA intercollegiate athletic conference that existed from 1974 to 1997, and the second of two conferences to share this name. The conference's members were located in the state of Oklahoma. Most of the team's members moved from the defunct Oklahoma Collegiate Conference in 1974, which itself evolved from the first iteration of the Oklahoma Intercollegiate Conference in 1929. The conference disbanded in 1997, after most of its members joined the NCAA Division II's Lone Star Conference.

== History ==
=== Chronological timeline ===
- 1974 – The Oklahoma Intercollegiate Conference (OIC) was founded. Charter members included Central State University (now the University of Central Oklahoma), East Central Oklahoma State University (now East Central University), Northeastern Oklahoma State University (now Northeastern State University), Northwestern Oklahoma State University, Southeastern Oklahoma State University, and Southwestern Oklahoma State University, beginning the 1974–75 academic year.
- 1977 – Central State [Okla.] (now Central Oklahoma) left the OIC after the 1976–77 academic year.
- 1991 – Langston University joined the OIC in the 1991–92 academic year.
- 1994 – The University of Science and Arts of Oklahoma (USAO) joined the OIC in the 1994–95 academic year.
- 1995 – Oklahoma Panhandle State University joined the OIC in the 1995–96 academic year.
- 1997 – The OIC ceased operations as an athletic conference after the 1996–97 academic year; as many schools left to join their respective new home primary conferences, beginning the 1997–98 academic year:
  - Langston, Northwestern Oklahoma State, and the USAO as NAIA Independents (who all would later join the Red River Athletic Conference (RRAC), beginning the 1998–99 school year)
  - and Oklahoma Panhandle State (OPSU) to join the Division II ranks of the National Collegiate Athletic Association (NCAA) as an NCAA D-II Independent (which would later join the Heartland Conference, beginning the 2002–03 school year)
  - and East Central [Okla.], Northeastern State, Southeastern Oklahoma State and Southwestern Oklahoma State to join the NCAA Division II ranks and the Lone Star Conference (LSC).

== Member schools ==
=== Final members ===
Institution	Location (Note: All locations were within the State of Oklahoma.)	Founded	Affiliation	Enrollment	Nickname	Joined (Note: Represents the calendar year when fall sports competition begins.)	Left (Note: Represents the calendar year when spring sports competition ends.)	Subsequent conference(s)	Current conference
East Central Oklahoma State University (Note: Currently known as East Central University since 1985.)	Ada	1909	Public (Note: Part of the Regional University System of Oklahoma.)	4,447	Tigers	1974	1997	Lone Star (LSC) (Note: Currently an NCAA Division II athletic conference.) (1997–2011)	Great American (GAC) (2011–present)
Langston University	Langston	1897	Public (Note: Part of the Board of Regents for the Oklahoma Agricultural and Mechanical Colleges.) (Note: Also a Historically black college and university.)	2,554	Lions	1991	1997	NAIA Independent (1997–98); Red River (RRAC) (1998–2018)	Sooner (SAC) (2018–present)
Northeastern Oklahoma State University (Note: Currently known as Northeastern State University since 1985.)	Tahlequah	1909	Public	8,276	Redmen (Note: Northeastern State changed its nickname from Redmen to RiverHawks in 2006.)	1974	1997	Lone Star (LSC) (1997–2011); D-II Independent (2011–12)	Mid-America (MIAA) (2012–present)
Northwestern Oklahoma State University (Note: Formerly known as Northwestern State College until 1974.)	Alva	1897	Public	1,857	Rangers	1974	1997	various (Note: Northwestern Oklahoma State had joined the following subsequent conferences: as an NAIA Independent during the 1997–98 school year; the Red River Athletic Conference (RRAC) from 1998–99 to 2000–01; and the Sooner Athletic Conference (SAC) from 2001–02 to 2011–12.)	Great American (GAC) (2012–present)
Oklahoma Panhandle State University	Goodwell	1909	Public	1,207	Aggies	1995	1997	D-II Independent (1997–2002); Heartland (2002–17)	Sooner (SAC) (2017–present)
Southeastern Oklahoma State University (Note: Formerly known as Southeastern State College until 1974.)	Durant	1909	Public	3,889	Savages (Note: Southeastern Oklahoma State changed its nickname from Savages to Savage Storm in 2006.)	1974	1997	Lone Star (LSC) (1997–2011)	Great American (GAC) (2011–present)
Southwestern Oklahoma State University (Note: Formerly known as Southwestern State College until 1974.)	Weatherford	1901	Public	5,154	Bulldogs	1974	1997	Lone Star (LSC) (1997–2011)	Great American (GAC) (2011–present)
University of Science and Arts of Oklahoma	Chickasha	1908	Public (Note: Part of the Board of Regents of the University of Science & Arts of Oklahoma.)	813	Drovers	1994	1997	NAIA Independent (1997–98); Red River (RRAC) (1998–2000)	Sooner (SAC) (2000–present)

=== Former members ===
Institution	Location (Note: All locations were within the State of Oklahoma.)	Founded	Affiliation	Enrollment	Nickname	Joined (Note: Represents the calendar year when fall sports competition begins.)	Left (Note: Represents the calendar year when spring sports competition ends.)	Subsequent conference(s)	Current conference
Central State University (Note: Currently known as the University of Central Oklahoma since 1990.)	Edmond	1890	Public (Note: Part of the Regional University System of Oklahoma.)	16,428	Bronchos	1974	1977	various (Note: Central Oklahoma had joined the following subsequent conferences: as an NAIA Independent from 1977–78 to 1986–87; the Lone Star Conference (LSC) (Note: Currently an NCAA Division II athletic conference.) from 1987–88 to 2010–11; and as an NCAA Division II Independent during the 2011–12 school year.)	Mid-America (MIAA) (2012–present)

=== Membership timeline ===
Full member (all sports) Full member (non-football)

== Football champions ==
- 1974 – Southwestern Oklahoma State
- 1975 – East Central
- 1976 – Southeastern Oklahoma State
- 1977 – Southwestern Oklahoma State
- 1978 – East Central
- 1979 – East Central
- 1980 – East Central, Northeastern State, and Southwestern Oklahoma State
- 1981 – Northeastern State
- 1982 – Northeastern State
- 1983 – Northeastern State
- 1984 – East Central
- 1985 – East Central and Southwestern Oklahoma State
- 1986 – East Central and Northwestern Oklahoma State
- 1987 – East Central and Northeastern State
- 1988 – Southeastern Oklahoma State
- 1989 – Northwestern Oklahoma State and Southeastern Oklahoma State
- 1990 – Northeastern State
- 1991 – Northeastern State
- 1992 – East Central and Southwestern Oklahoma State
- 1993 – Langston (OK)
- 1994 – Langston (OK), Northeastern State, and Southeastern Oklahoma State
- 1995 – Northeastern State
- 1996 – Southeastern Oklahoma State and Southwestern Oklahoma State

== See also ==
- List of defunct college football conferences
