= List of Saint Mary Spires head football coaches =

The Saint Mary Spires football program is a college football team that represents University of Saint Mary in the Kansas Collegiate Athletic Conference, a part of the NAIA. The team has had 4 head coaches since the school restarted the program in 2000. The current coach is Jay Osborne, who took the post as interim coach in 2014 after Lance Hinson left for McMurry University.

Some records show occasional one and two-game seasons being played as far back as 1899 and then sporadically until 1968. No coach is listed for those seasons. Another source mentions that former Green Bay Packers player Dukes Duford coached at Saint Mary and in 1930 coached the team to a conference championship.

== Key ==
Key to symbols in coaches list
General		Overall		Conference		Postseason (Note: Although the first Rose Bowl Game was played in 1902, it has been continuously played since the 1916 game, and is recognized as the oldest bowl game by the NCAA. "—" indicates any season prior to 1916 when postseason games were not played.)	
No.	Order of coaches (Note: A running total of the number of head coaches, with coaches who served separate tenures being counted only once. Interim head coaches are represented with "Int" and are not counted in the running total. "—" indicates the team played but either without a coach or no coach is on record. "X" indicates an interim year without play.)	GC	Games coached	CW	Conference wins	PW	Postseason wins
DC	Division championships	OW	Overall wins	CL	Conference losses	PL	Postseason losses
CC	Conference championships	OL	Overall losses	CT	Conference ties	PT	Postseason ties
NC	National championships	OT	Overall ties (Note: Overtime rules in college football were introduced in 1996, making ties impossible in the period since.)	C%	Conference winning percentage		
†	Elected to the College Football Hall of Fame	O%	Overall winning percentage (Note: When computing the win–loss percentage, a tie counts as half a win and half a loss.)				

== Coaches ==
Statistics correct as of the end of the 2023 college football season.

No.	Name	Term	GC	OW	OL	OT	O%	CW	CL	CT	C%	PW	PL	CCs	NCs	Awards
?	Dukes Duford	??–??	??	??	??	??	??	—	—	—		—	—	—	—	
1 (modern era)	Kevin Haslam	2000–2001	18	1	17	0	.056	—	—	—		—	—	—	—	
2	Scott Frear	2002–2004	28	10	18	0	.357	—	—	—		—	—	—	—	
3	Lance Hinson	2005–2013; 2020–present	128	48	80	0	.375	43	68	0	.387	—	—	—		Conference coach of the year: 2005, 2011
4	Jay Osborne	2014–2019	65	23	42	0	.354	21	35	0	.375	—	—	—	—	

== See also ==
- Lists of people from Kansas
- List of Kansas Collegiate Athletic Conference people
