= 2014 McMurry War Hawks football team =

American college football season

2014 McMurry War Hawks football
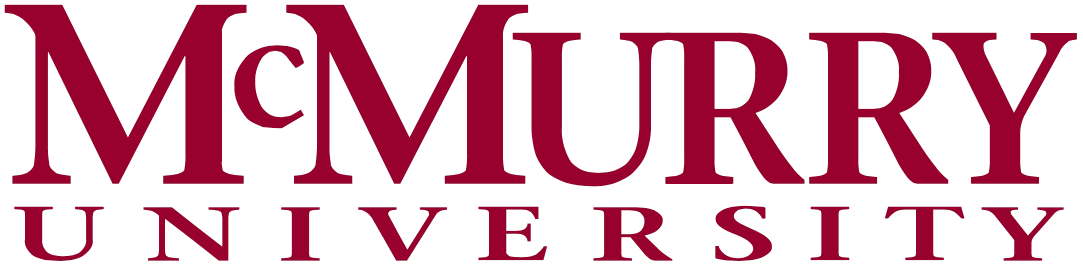
- Conference: Lone Star Conference
- Record: 2–8 (1–6 LSC)
- Head coach: Lance Hinson (1st season)
- Offensive scheme: Spread
- Defensive coordinator: Kendall Roberson (2nd season)
- Base defense: 3–3–5
- Home stadium: Wilford Moore Stadium

2014 Lone Star Conference football standings
	Conf.			Overall
Team	W		L	W		L
Texas A&M–Commerce # $	6	–	1	9	–	3
No. 20 Angelo State ^	5	–	2	9	–	3
Midwestern State	5	–	2	6	–	4
West Texas A&M †	4	–	3	6	–	5
Tarleton State	4	–	3	5	–	5
Eastern New Mexico	3	–	4	7	–	4
McMurry @	1	–	6	2	–	8
Texas A&M–Kingsville	0	–	7	2	–	9
$ – Conference champion; ^ – NCAA Division II playoff participant; # – C.H.A.M.P.S. Heart of Texas Bowl participant @– Provisional Division III member † – West Texas A&M vacated 4 wins, including 3 conference wins; Rankings from AFCA poll

The 2014 McMurry War Hawks football team represented McMurry University in the 2014 NCAA Division II football season as a member of the Lone Star Conference (LSC). Led by first-year head coach Lance Hinson, the War Hawks compiled an overall record of 2–8 with a conference record of 1–6, finishing seventh in the LSC.

This was the last year the War Hawks competed as a provisional NCAA Division II member and the only season the program played in the LSC. On January 31, 2014, the university's board of trustees voted to withdraw the school's provisional Division II status and remain in Division III for all of its athletic programs.

== Offseason ==
=== Coaching changes ===
After the announce that the War Hawks would return to NCAA Division III competition, several coaches announced that they would be stepping down, including head coach Mason Miller. Kendall Roberson, the defensive coordinator, was named interim head coach following Miller's resignation. On June 1, 2014, Saint Mary (KS) head coach Lance Hinson was named as the War Hawks' new head coach.

== Preseason ==
=== LSC media poll ===
The LSC preseason prediction poll was released in late July. The War Hawks were predicted to finish eighth (last) in the conference.

== Schedule ==
Date	Time	Opponent	Site	TV	Result	Attendance
September 6	7:00 p.m.	at Houston Baptist*	Husky Stadium; Houston, TX	FSSW	W 26–17	4,018
September 20	7:00 p.m.	at Angelo State	LeGrand Sports Complex; San Angelo, TX		L 14–45	3,745
September 27	6:00 p.m.	Texas A&M–Kingsville	Wilford Moore Stadium; Abilene, TX		W 27–21	2,817
October 4	3:00 p.m.	at West Texas A&M	Kimbrough Memorial Stadium; Canyon, TX		L 21–56	10,592
October 11	2:00 p.m.	Eastern New Mexico^{†}	Wilford Moore Stadium; Abilene, TX		L 23–62	2,759
October 18	8:00 p.m.	at Midwestern State	Memorial Stadium; Wichita Falls, TX		L 13–71	6,217
October 25	2:00 p.m.	Tarleton State	Wilford Moore Stadium; Abilene, TX		L 7–64	2,743
November 1	4:00 p.m.	at Texas A&M–Commerce	Memorial Stadium; Commerce, TX		L 13–91	9,496
November 8	6:00 p.m.	at West Texas A&M*	Kimbrough Memorial Stadium; Canyon, TX (LSC Playoffs)		L 13–58	783
November 15	7:00 p.m.	Texas A&M–Kingsville*	Wilford Moore Stadium; Abilene, TX (LSC Playoffs)		L 16–41	213
*Non-conference game; ^{†}Homecoming; All times are in Central time

== Game summaries ==
=== At Houston Baptist ===
	1	2	3	4	Total
War Hawks	7	6	7	6	26
Huskies	8	0	6	3	17

Statistics	MCM	HBU
First downs	18	26
Total yards	405	324
Rushing yards	102	145
Passing yards	303	179
Turnovers	4	4
Time of possession	28:41	31:19

Team	Category	Player	Statistics
McMurry	Passing	Matthew McHugh	14/23, 303 yards, 2 TD, 2 INT
McMurry	Rushing	Chris Simpson Jr.	12 rushes, 45 yards, TD
McMurry	Receiving	Jeret Smith	6 receptions, 123 yards, 2 TD
Houston Baptist	Passing	Jonathan Fleming	20/39, 179 yards, TD, 2 INT
Houston Baptist	Rushing	B. J. Kelley	13 rushes, 64 yards
Houston Baptist	Receiving	D'Angelo Wallace	6 receptions, 61 yards, TD

=== At Angelo State ===
	1	2	3	4	Total
War Hawks	0	0	7	7	14
Rams	7	17	14	7	45

Statistics	MCM	ASU
First downs	14	17
Total yards	309	322
Rushing yards	91	137
Passing yards	218	185
Turnovers	3	0
Time of possession	33:59	26:01

Team	Category	Player	Statistics
McMurry	Passing	Matthew McHugh	21/36, 205 yards, 2 TD, 2 INT
McMurry	Rushing	Chris Simpson Jr.	11 rushes, 57 yards
McMurry	Receiving	Emmanuel Mulumba	6 receptions, 60 yards
Angelo State	Passing	Kyle Washington	14/16, 137 yards, 2 TD
Angelo State	Rushing	Blake Smith	16 rushes, 49 yards, TD
Angelo State	Receiving	Donovan Thompson	4 receptions, 44 yards, TD

=== Texas A&M–Kingsville ===
	1	2	3	4	Total
Javelinas	7	7	0	7	21
War Hawls	6	14	7	0	27

Statistics	TAMUK	MCM
First downs	21	18
Total yards	404	383
Rushing yards	227	170
Passing yards	177	213
Turnovers	3	1
Time of possession	32:15	27:45

Team	Category	Player	Statistics
Texas A&M–Kingsville	Passing	Alex Rios	9/18, 109 yards, 2 INT
Texas A&M–Kingsville	Rushing	Greg Pitre	16 rushes, 113 yards
Texas A&M–Kingsville	Receiving	Patrick LaFleur	4 receptions, 62 yards
McMurry	Passing	Matthew McHugh	17/29, 202 yards, 3 TD
McMurry	Rushing	Chris Simpson Jr.	15 rushes, 99 yards
McMurry	Receiving	Jeret Smith	3 receptions, 65 yards, TD

=== At West Texas A&M ===
	1	2	3	4	Total
War Hawks	7	14	0	0	21
Buffaloes	20	15	7	14	56

Statistics	MCM	WTAMU
First downs	24	26
Total yards	510	537
Rushing yards	74	187
Passing yards	436	350
Turnovers	1	0
Time of possession	32:44	27:16

Team	Category	Player	Statistics
McMurry	Passing	Matthew McHugh	29/44, 374 yards, 3 TD, INT
McMurry	Rushing	Chris Agugua	1 rush, 16 yards
McMurry	Receiving	Jeret Smith	10 receptions, 203 yards, 2 TD
West Texas A&M	Passing	Preston Rabb	25/32, 302 yards, 4 TD
West Texas A&M	Rushing	Geremy Alridge-Mitchell	16 rushes, 117 yards, 2 TD
West Texas A&M	Receiving	Anthony Johnson	5 receptions, 130 yards, TD

=== Eastern New Mexico ===
	1	2	3	4	Total
Greyhounds	14	14	13	21	62
War Hawks	0	14	2	7	23

Statistics	ENMU	MCM
First downs	30	15
Total yards	494	351
Rushing yards	426	80
Passing yards	68	271
Turnovers	0	1
Time of possession	35:25	24:35

Team	Category	Player	Statistics
Eastern New Mexico	Passing	Jeremy Buurma	6/8, 68 yards, TD
Eastern New Mexico	Rushing	E'lon Spight	27 rushes, 189 yards, 4 TD
Eastern New Mexico	Receiving	Jordan Wells	2 receptions, 25 yards
McMurry	Passing	Matthew McHugh	15/35, 269 yards, 2 TD, INT
McMurry	Rushing	Paxton Grayer	8 rushes, 55 yards, TD
McMurry	Receiving	Jeret Smith	7 receptions, 168 yards, TD

=== At Midwestern State ===
	1	2	3	4	Total
War Hawks	0	7	0	6	13
Mustangs	21	16	14	20	71

Statistics	MCM	MSU
First downs	18	28
Total yards	243	566
Rushing yards	16	383
Passing yards	227	183
Turnovers	3	2
Time of possession	30:33	29:27

Team	Category	Player	Statistics
McMurry	Passing	Matthew McHugh	18/39, 227 yards, 2 TD, INT
McMurry	Rushing	Chris Simpson Jr.	9 rushes, 29 yards
McMurry	Receiving	Jeret Smith	7 receptions, 141 yards, 2 TD
Midwestern State	Passing	Hagen Hutchinson	6/7, 82 yards, TD
Midwestern State	Rushing	Hagen Hutchinson	10 rushes, 106 yards, 2 TD
Midwestern State	Receiving	Statron Jones	4 receptions, 60 yards

=== Tarleton State ===
	1	2	3	4	Total
Texans	14	22	21	7	64
War Hawks	0	7	0	0	7

Statistics	TSU	MCM
First downs	29	14
Total yards	536	239
Rushing yards	322	97
Passing yards	214	142
Turnovers	0	5
Time of possession	26:47	33:13

Team	Category	Player	Statistics
Tarleton State	Passing	Collin Strahan	15/22, 197 yards, 3 TD
Tarleton State	Rushing	Zach Henshaw	8 rushes, 114 yards, TD
Tarleton State	Receiving	Clifton Rhodes III	4 receptions, 82 yards, TD
McMurry	Passing	Matthew McHugh	7/14, 106 yards, TD
McMurry	Rushing	Paxton Grayer	14 rushes, 43 yards
McMurry	Receiving	Jeret Smith	4 receptions, 84 yards, TD

=== At Texas A&M–Commerce ===
	1	2	3	4	Total
War Hawks	0	6	0	7	13
Lions	21	28	21	21	91

Statistics	MCM	TAMUC
First downs	10	20
Total yards	318	582
Rushing yards	18	263
Passing yards	300	319
Turnovers	3	3
Time of possession	38:04	21:56

Team	Category	Player	Statistics
McMurry	Passing	Cy Ward	10/17, 116 yards, 2 INT
McMurry	Rushing	Chris Simpson Jr.	11 rushes, 41 yards
McMurry	Receiving	Jeret Smith	6 receptions, 195 yards, 2 TD
Texas A&M–Commerce	Passing	Tyrik Rollison	7/10, 203 yards, 3 TD, 2 INT
Texas A&M–Commerce	Rushing	Joe Bergeron	9 rushes, 86 yards, TD
Texas A&M–Commerce	Receiving	Vernon Johnson	3 receptions, 118 yards, TD

=== At West Texas A&M (LSC Playoffs) ===
	1	2	3	4	Total
War Hawks	0	13	0	0	13
Buffaloes	21	20	0	17	58

Statistics	MCM	WTAMU
First downs	15	27
Total yards	220	546
Rushing yards	65	260
Passing yards	155	286
Turnovers	2	2
Time of possession	31:29	28:31

Team	Category	Player	Statistics
McMurry	Passing	Matthew Bailey	5/9, 80 yards
McMurry	Rushing	Paxton Grayer	14 rushes, 70 yards, TD
McMurry	Receiving	Paxton Grayer	7 receptions, 53 yards
West Texas A&M	Passing	Preston Rabb	24/29, 238 yards, 2 TD, INT
West Texas A&M	Rushing	Geremy Alridge-Mitchell	23 rushes, 175 yards, 2 TD
West Texas A&M	Receiving	Word Hudson	9 receptions, 96 yards

=== Texas A&M–Kingsville (LSC Playoffs) ===
	1	2	3	4	Total
Javelinas	7	13	7	14	41
War Hawks	7	0	0	9	16

Statistics	TAMUK	MCM
First downs	26	9
Total yards	452	266
Rushing yards	239	119
Passing yards	213	147
Turnovers	1	7
Time of possession	40:36	19:24

Team	Category	Player	Statistics
Texas A&M–Kingsville	Passing	Trey Mitchell	16/28, 174 yards, TD
Texas A&M–Kingsville	Rushing	Trey Mitchell	21 rushes, 93 yards, 2 TD
Texas A&M–Kingsville	Receiving	Musa Mahmud	6 receptions, 87 yards
McMurry	Passing	Cy Ward	6/9, 130 yards, 2 TD, INT
McMurry	Rushing	Paxton Grayer	13 rushes, 117 yards
McMurry	Receiving	Jeret Smith	7 receptions, 132 yards, 2 TD
