= 2014 Southern Arkansas Muleriders football team =

American college football season

2014 Southern Arkansas Muleriders football
- Conference: Great American Conference
- Record: 5-5 (5-5 GAC)
- Head coach: Bill Keopple (6th season)
- Offensive coordinator: Landon Keopple (6th season)
- Offensive scheme: Spread
- Defensive coordinator: Josh Lawson (6th season)
- Base defense: 4-3
- Home stadium: Wilkins Stadium

2014 Great American Conference football standings
	Conf.			Overall
Team	W		L	W		L
No. 9 Ouachita Baptist $^	10	–	0	10	–	1
No. 17 Harding ^	9	–	1	9	–	2
No. 25 Henderson State	8	–	2	9	–	2
SE Oklahoma State #	6	–	4	7	–	5
East Central #	6	–	4	6	–	5
Southern Arkansas	5	–	5	5	–	5
NW Oklahoma State *	3	–	7	3	–	7
SW Oklahoma State	3	–	7	3	–	7
Arkansas Tech	3	–	7	3	–	8
Arkansas–Monticello	2	–	8	2	–	8
Southern Nazarene	0	–	10	0	–	11
$ – Conference champion; ^ – NCAA Division II playoff participant; # – bowl game participant (East Central: C.H.A.M.P.S. Heart of Texas Bowl, SE Oklahoma State: Live United Texarkana Bowl) * – Provisional NCAA Division II member; Rankings from AFCA poll

The 2014 Southern Arkansas Muleriders football team represented Southern Arkansas University in the 2014 NCAA Division II football season. The team was coached by Bill Keopple, who finished his sixth season as head coach at SAU. The Muleriders played their home games at Wilkins Stadium in Magnolia, Arkansas and competed in the Great American Conference (GAC).

== Schedule ==
Date	Time	Opponent	Site	Result	Attendance
September 6	6:00 pm	Southeastern Oklahoma State	Wilkins Stadium; Magnolia, AR	W 30-29	1,657
September 13	6:00 pm	East Central	Norris Field; Ada, OK	L 40-47	3,532
September 20	6:00 pm	Southwestern Oklahoma State	Milam Stadium - Fast Lane Field; Weatherford, OK	L 24-27	1,767
September 27	2:00 pm	Northwestern Oklahoma State	Wilkins Stadium; Magnolia, AR	W 62-21	2,217
October 4	6:00 pm	No. 15 Harding	First Security Stadium; Searcy, AR	L 13-56	4,422
October 11	6:00 pm	Arkansas Tech	Wilkins Stadium; Magnolia, AR	W 21-14	1,798
October 18	2:30 pm	Southern Nazarene^{†}	Wilkins Stadium; Magnolia, AR	W 62-7	3,874
November 1	1:00 pm	No. 13 Ouachita Baptist	Cliff Harris Stadium; Arkadelphia, AR	L 28-38	1,842
November 8	3:00 pm	No. 14 Henderson State	Memorial Stadium; El Dorado, AR (Murphy USA Classic)	L 41-55	4,987
November 15	3:00 pm	Arkansas-Monticello	Willis Convoy Leslie Cotton Boll Stadium; Monticello, AR (Battle of the Timberlands)	W 66-42	2290
^{†}Homecoming; Rankings from Coaches' Poll released prior to the game; All times are in Central time
