= Kevin Haslam =

Kevin Haslam may refer to:

- Kevin Haslam (American football coach), college sports administrator and former college football coach
- Kevin Haslam (American football player) (born 1986), American football offensive tackle
