= 2014 West Texas A&M Buffaloes football team =

American college football season

2014 West Texas A&M Buffaloes football
- Conference: Lone Star Conference
- Record: 2–5, 4 wins vacated (1–3 LSC, 3 wins vacated)
- Head coach: Mike Nesbitt (2nd season)
- Offensive coordinator: Stephen Lee (4th season)
- Offensive scheme: Air raid
- Defensive coordinator: Nick Paremski (2nd season)
- Base defense: 3–4
- Home stadium: Kimbrough Memorial Stadium

2014 Lone Star Conference football standings
	Conf.			Overall
Team	W		L	W		L
Texas A&M–Commerce # $	6	–	1	9	–	3
No. 20 Angelo State ^	5	–	2	9	–	3
Midwestern State	5	–	2	6	–	4
West Texas A&M †	4	–	3	6	–	5
Tarleton State	4	–	3	5	–	5
Eastern New Mexico	3	–	4	7	–	4
McMurry @	1	–	6	2	–	8
Texas A&M–Kingsville	0	–	7	2	–	9
$ – Conference champion; ^ – NCAA Division II playoff participant; # – C.H.A.M.P.S. Heart of Texas Bowl participant @– Provisional Division III member † – West Texas A&M vacated 4 wins, including 3 conference wins; Rankings from AFCA poll

The 2014 West Texas A&M Buffaloes football team represented West Texas A&M University in the 2014 NCAA Division II football season as a member of the Lone Star Conference (LSC). The Buffaloes were led by second-year head coach Mike Nesbitt. Nesbitt led the Buffaloes through the 2013 season under the interim tag and was promoted to full-time head coach following the season.

On March 23, 2016, the NCAA announced that the Buffaloes would have to vacate four wins from the 2014 season due to academic fraud violations. The violations were found as part of a larger investigation related to the dismissal of former head coach Don Carthel.

== Preseason ==
=== Media poll ===
The LSC preseason prediction poll was released in late July. The Buffaloes were predicted to finish second in the conference.

== Schedule ==
Date	Time	Opponent	Rank	Site	Result	Attendance
September 4	7:00 p.m.	at No. 4 CSU Pueblo*	No. 11	DeRose ThunderBowl; Pueblo, CO	L 6–35	7,321
September 13	7:00 p.m.	No. 16 Tarleton State	No. 22	Kimbrough Memorial Stadium; Canyon, TX	L 27–31	9,237
September 20	1:00 p.m.	vs. Shorter (GA)*		AT&T Stadium; Arlington, TX (LSC Football Festival)	W 27–19 (vacated)	13,024
September 27	7:00 p.m.	Angelo State		LeGrand Sports Complex; San Angelo, TX	W 58–41 (vacated)	5,946
October 4	3:00 p.m.	McMurry^{†}		Kimbrough Memorial Stadium; Canyon, TX	W 56–21 (vacated)	10,592
October 11	7:00 p.m.	No. 25 Midwestern State		Kimbrough Memorial Stadium; Canyon, TX	W 34–13 (vacated)	6,435
October 18	7:00 p.m.	at No. 23 Texas A&M–Commerce		Memorial Stadium; Commerce, TX (East Texas vs. West Texas)	L 21–48	7,048
October 25	3:00 p.m.	Texas A&M–Kingsville		Kimbrough Memorial Stadium; Canyon, TX	W 48–21	5,827
November 1	7:00 p.m.	at Eastern New Mexico		Greyhound Stadium; Portales, NM (Wagon Wheel)	L 21–31	4,267
November 8	6:00 p.m.	McMurry*		Kimbrough Memorial Stadium; Canyon, TX (LSC Playoffs)	W 58–13	783
November 15	1:00 p.m.	at Eastern New Mexico*		Greyhounds Stadium; Portales, NM (LSC Playoffs)	L 45–55	1,673
*Non-conference game; ^{†}Homecoming; Rankings from AFCA Poll released prior to the game; All times are in Central time

== Game summaries ==
=== At No. 4 CSU Pueblo ===
	1	2	3	4	Total
No. 11 Buffaloes	3	0	0	3	6
No. 4 ThunderWolves	14	7	7	7	35

Statistics	WTAMU	CSUP
First downs	16	19
Total yards	302	440
Rushing yards	94	163
Passing yards	208	277
Turnovers	3	1
Time of possession	27:15	32:45

Team	Category	Player	Statistics
West Texas A&M	Passing	Preston Rabb	25/49, 208 yards
West Texas A&M	Rushing	Venric Mark	12 rushes, 58 yards
West Texas A&M	Receiving	Jarrian Rhone	5 receptions, 72 yards
CSU Pueblo	Passing	Chris Bonner	16/31, 277 yards, 4 TD, INT
CSU Pueblo	Rushing	Cameron McDondle	21 rushes, 83 yards
CSU Pueblo	Receiving	Paul Browning	4 receptions, 102 yards, TD

=== No. 16 Tarleton State ===
	1	2	3	4	Total
No. 16 Texans	0	10	7	14	31
No. 22 Buffaloes	3	7	10	7	27

Statistics	TSU	WTAMU
First downs	29	25
Total yards	497	386
Rushing yards	298	137
Passing yards	199	249
Turnovers	1	1
Time of possession	29:07	30:53

Team	Category	Player	Statistics
Tarleton State	Passing	Collin Strahan	16/22, 123 yards
Tarleton State	Rushing	Collin Strahan	21 rushes, 124 yards, TD
Tarleton State	Receiving	Clifton Rhodes III	5 receptions, 83 yards
West Texas A&M	Passing	Preston Rabb	21/34, 249 yards, TD, INT
West Texas A&M	Rushing	Venric Mark	20 rushes, 88 yards
West Texas A&M	Receiving	Anthony Johnson	9 receptions, 138 yards, TD

=== Vs. Shorter (GA) ===
	1	2	3	4	Total
Hawks	6	13	0	0	19
Buffaloes	0	7	13	7	27

Statistics	SU	WTAMU
First downs	16	16
Total yards	236	309
Rushing yards	224	129
Passing yards	12	180
Turnovers	3	3
Time of possession	33:39	26:21

Team	Category	Player	Statistics
Shorter	Passing	Eric Dodson	3/7, 12 yards, INT
Shorter	Rushing	Eric Dodson	20 rushes, 95 yards, TD
Shorter	Receiving	Trey Lawhorn	1 reception, 7 yards
West Texas A&M	Passing	Preston Rabb	15/23, 180 yards, TD, 2 INT
West Texas A&M	Rushing	Geremy Alridge-Mitchell	29 rushes, 118 yards, TD
West Texas A&M	Receiving	Anthony Johnson	6 receptions, 100 yards, TD

=== At Angelo State ===
	1	2	3	4	Total
Buffaloes	0	21	24	13	58
Rams	14	21	6	0	41

Statistics	WTAMU	ASU
First downs	32	24
Total yards	637	476
Rushing yards	142	144
Passing yards	495	332
Turnovers	0	3
Time of possession	33:00	27:00

Team	Category	Player	Statistics
West Texas A&M	Passing	Preston Rabb	34/49, 495 yards, 3 TD
West Texas A&M	Rushing	Geremy Alridge-Mitchell	27 rushes, 113 yards, TD
West Texas A&M	Receiving	Jeremy Watson	12 receptions, 269 yards, TD
Angelo State	Passing	Kyle Washington	26/42, 332 yards, 2 TD, 3 INT
Angelo State	Rushing	Ryan Byrd	13 rushes, 92 yards, 2 TD
Angelo State	Receiving	Chris Omigie	4 receptions, 70 yards, TD

=== McMurry ===
	1	2	3	4	Total
War Hawks	7	14	0	0	21
Buffaloes	20	15	7	14	56

Statistics	MCM	WTAMU
First downs	24	26
Total yards	510	537
Rushing yards	74	187
Passing yards	436	350
Turnovers	1	0
Time of possession	32:44	27:16

Team	Category	Player	Statistics
McMurry	Passing	Matthew McHugh	29/44, 374 yards, 3 TD, INT
McMurry	Rushing	Chris Agugua	1 rush, 16 yards
McMurry	Receiving	Jeret Smith	10 receptions, 203 yards, 2 TD
West Texas A&M	Passing	Preston Rabb	25/32, 302 yards, 4 TD
West Texas A&M	Rushing	Geremy Alridge-Mitchell	16 rushes, 117 yards, 2 TD
West Texas A&M	Receiving	Anthony Johnson	5 receptions, 130 yards, TD

=== No. 25 Midwestern State ===
	1	2	3	4	Total
No. 25 Mustangs	0	6	0	7	13
Buffaloes	10	7	3	14	34

Statistics	MSU	WTAMU
First downs	21	23
Total yards	426	510
Rushing yards	347	197
Passing yards	79	313
Turnovers	1	1
Time of possession	29:51	30:09

Team	Category	Player	Statistics
Midwestern State	Passing	Quade Coward	6/9, 49 yards
Midwestern State	Rushing	Dante Taylor	18 rushes, 159 yards, TD
Midwestern State	Receiving	Arsenio Phillips	5 receptions, 38 yards
West Texas A&M	Passing	Preston Rabb	18/26, 313 yards, 2 TD
West Texas A&M	Rushing	Geremy Alridge-Mitchell	33 rushes, 163 yards, 2 TD
West Texas A&M	Receiving	Anthony Johnson	6 receptions, 123 yards

=== At No. 23 Texas A&M–Commerce ===
	1	2	3	4	Total
Buffaloes	0	14	0	7	21
No. 23 Lions	9	14	25	0	48

Statistics	WTAMU	TAMUC
First downs	24	21
Total yards	398	495
Rushing yards	245	113
Passing yards	153	382
Turnovers	4	1
Time of possession	27:23	31:24

Team	Category	Player	Statistics
West Texas A&M	Passing	Preston Rabb	17/38, 153 yards, TD, 3 INT
West Texas A&M	Rushing	Geremy Alridge-Mitchell	28 rushes, 160 yards, 2 TD
West Texas A&M	Receiving	Anthony Johnson	5 receptions, 58 yards
Texas A&M–Commerce	Passing	Tyrik Rollison	24/33, 355 yards, 3 TD, INT
Texas A&M–Commerce	Rushing	Richard Cooper	16 rushes, 81 yards
Texas A&M–Commerce	Receiving	Ricky Collins	9 receptions, 153 yards, 2 TD

=== Texas A&M–Kingsville ===
	1	2	3	4	Total
Javelinas	0	7	7	7	21
Buffaloes	14	10	14	10	48

Statistics	TAMUK	WTAMU
First downs	23	27
Total yards	458	502
Rushing yards	301	196
Passing yards	157	306
Turnovers	2	1
Time of possession	32:59	27:01

Team	Category	Player	Statistics
Texas A&M–Kingsville	Passing	Trey Mitchell	16/27, 140 yards, 2 INT
Texas A&M–Kingsville	Rushing	Shawn Vasquez	11 rushes, 107 yards, TD
Texas A&M–Kingsville	Receiving	Patrick LaFleur	8 receptions, 79 yards
West Texas A&M	Passing	Preston Rabb	20/30, 296 yards, 3 TD, INT
West Texas A&M	Rushing	Geremy Alridge-Mitchell	21 rushes, 121 yards, 2 TD
West Texas A&M	Receiving	Jeremy Watson	8 receptions, 90 yards

=== At Eastern New Mexico ===
	1	2	3	4	Total
Buffaloes	0	0	7	14	21
Greyhounds	21	0	10	0	31

Statistics	WTAMU	ENMU
First downs	14	25
Total yards	266	393
Rushing yards	93	306
Passing yards	173	87
Turnovers	2	1
Time of possession	18:52	41:08

Team	Category	Player	Statistics
West Texas A&M	Passing	Preston Rabb	21/33, 173 yards, TD, INT
West Texas A&M	Rushing	Geremy Alridge-Mitchell	15 rushes, 114 yards, 2 TD
West Texas A&M	Receiving	Word Hudson	9 receptions, 59 yards
Eastern New Mexico	Passing	Jeremy Buurma	6/8, 87 yards, TD
Eastern New Mexico	Rushing	E'lon Spight	33 rushes, 161 yards, TD
Eastern New Mexico	Receiving	Jacob Johnson	3 receptions, 40 yards, TD

=== McMurry (LSC Playoffs) ===
	1	2	3	4	Total
War Hawks	0	13	0	0	13
Buffaloes	21	20	0	17	58

Statistics	MCM	WTAMU
First downs	15	27
Total yards	220	546
Rushing yards	65	260
Passing yards	155	286
Turnovers	2	2
Time of possession	31:29	28:31

Team	Category	Player	Statistics
McMurry	Passing	Matthew Bailey	5/9, 80 yards
McMurry	Rushing	Paxton Grayer	14 rushes, 70 yards, TD
McMurry	Receiving	Paxton Grayer	7 receptions, 53 yards
West Texas A&M	Passing	Preston Rabb	24/29, 238 yards, 2 TD, INT
West Texas A&M	Rushing	Geremy Alridge-Mitchell	23 rushes, 175 yards, 2 TD
West Texas A&M	Receiving	Word Hudson	9 receptions, 96 yards

=== At Eastern New Mexico (LSC Playoffs) ===
	1	2	3	4	Total
Buffaloes	14	0	21	10	45
Greyhounds	7	27	8	13	55

Statistics	WTAMU	ENMU
First downs	18	24
Total yards	456	510
Rushing yards	151	315
Passing yards	305	195
Turnovers	2	1
Time of possession	25:12	34:48

Team	Category	Player	Statistics
West Texas A&M	Passing	Preston Rabb	23/37, 305 yards, TD, INT
West Texas A&M	Rushing	Geremy Alridge-Mitchell	27 rushes, 167 yards, 5 TD
West Texas A&M	Receiving	Jeremy Watson	12 receptions, 157 yards
Eastern New Mexico	Passing	Jeremy Buurma	7/9, 195 yards, 3 TD
Eastern New Mexico	Rushing	E'lon Spight	25 rushes, 132 yards
Eastern New Mexico	Receiving	Jacob Johnson	4 receptions, 119 yards, 2 TD
