= Jay Osborne =

American football coach

Playing career
- 2003–2006: Saint Mary (KS)
- Positions: Wide receiver, return specialist

Coaching career (HC unless noted)
- 2010–2013: Saint Mary (KS) (OC/RC)
- 2014–2019: Saint Mary (KS)
- 2020: Independence (OC)

Head coaching record
- Overall: 23–42

Jay Osborne is an American college football coach. He served as the head football coach at University of Saint Mary in Leavenworth, Kansas from 2014 to 2019. Osborne also played college football for four years at Saint Mary. Osborne joined the program's coaching staff as the offensive coordinator in 2010. He was named the interim head coach in 2014 following the resignation of Lance Hinson.

== Head coaching record ==
Year	Team	Overall	Conference	Standing	Bowl/playoffs
Saint Mary Spires (Kansas Collegiate Athletic Conference) (2014–2019)
2014	Saint Mary	4–7	4–5	T–6th	
2015	Saint Mary	3–8	3–6	T–5th	
2016	Saint Mary	8–3	7–2	T–2nd	
2017	Saint Mary	4–7	3–6	T–7th	
2018	Saint Mary	4–6	4–6	T–6th	
2019	Saint Mary	0–11	0–10	11th	
Saint Mary:		23–42	21–35		
Total:		23–42			
