= Lance Hinson =

American football coach

Biographical details
- Born: Muskogee, Oklahoma, U.S.

Coaching career (HC unless noted)
- 1993–1997: North Texas (SA/GA)
- 1997–2001: Baker (QB/WR/TE)
- 2002–2004: Saint Mary (KS) (DC/LB)
- 2005–2013: Saint Mary (KS)
- 2014–2018: McMurry
- 2020–2025: Saint Mary (KS)

Head coaching record
- Overall: 66–132

Accomplishments and honors

Awards
- 2× KCAC Coach of the Year (2005, 2011)

Lance Hinson is an American college football coach. He most recently served as the head football coach for the University of Saint Mary, a position he held from 2005 to 2013 and from 2020 to 2025. Between his two tenures at Saint Mary, Hinson was head football coach at McMurry University in Abilene, Texas, from 2014 to 2018.

== Coaching career ==
=== Assistant coaching ===
Hinson worked at several schools as an undergraduate/graduate coaching assistant and later as an assistant coach. While an assistant coach at Baker University his team completed a 9–2 season, recorded a victory in the KWTO Bowl and finished ranked #15 in the nation among NAIA schools.

=== Saint Mary ===
Hinson was the head football coach for the Saint Mary Spires located in Leavenworth, Kansas and has held that position since 2005. Hinson is the third person to take the post, and his overall coaching record at Saint Mary's is 36 wins, 56 losses, and 0 ties. Hinson was named to the post after the sudden resignation of Scott Frear

Hinson had been with the program since 2002 when he joined the squad as an assistant coach. Although his teams have not produced stellar performances, each and every year his squad performs above the expectations of peers and sportswriters and this success has helped the school to build a new football/soccer complex, allowing football to be played on campus for the first time in the school's history. Hinson's teams tend to be stronger on defense rather than offense, and this has become a part of his coaching strategy.

In 2005, Hinson was named Kansas Collegiate Athletic Conference "Co-Coach" of the year along with then Tabor coach Mike Gardner.

In 2009, the National Association of Intercollegiate Athletics selected Hinson as head coach for the College Fanz Senior Classic, an NAIA post-season game to highlight senior players across the country.

=== McMurry ===
In 2014, Hinson was named the head coach at McMurry University in Abilene, Texas. He held the position of head coach from 2014 through 2018, and his tenure was highlighted by two key victories: His first game was a win over NCAA Division I Houston Baptist and followed that with an upset of NCAA II traditional powerhouse Texas A&M-Kingsville. Hinson resigned after the conclusion of the 2018 season, having helped guide the program from NCAA Division II to NCAA Division III. His career at McMurray was 12 wins and 35 losses.

=== Return to Saint Mary ===
After a year as Assistant Athletic Director at Saint Mary's, Hinson once again took the position as head coach after the 2019 season was concluded.

== Personal life ==
Hinson lives in Abilene, Tx, and is married to his wife, Andi. He has three children, Jake, Holly, and Lily. Hinson earned a Bachelor of Science in Kinesiology and Psychology from the University of North Texas and a Master of Arts at Baker University.

== Head coaching record ==
Year	Team	Overall	Conference	Standing	Bowl/playoffs
Saint Mary Spires (Kansas Collegiate Athletic Conference) (2005–2013)
2005	Saint Mary	5–5	4–5	T–5th	
2006	Saint Mary	3–7	2–7	T–7th	
2007	Saint Mary	3–6	3–6	T–7th	
2008	Saint Mary	5–5	4–5	6th	
2009	Saint Mary	3–7	3–6	T–6th	
2010	Saint Mary	2–8	2–7	T–8th	
2011	Saint Mary	7–4	7–2	2nd	
2012	Saint Mary	6–5	6–3	T–3rd	
2013	Saint Mary	4–7	3–6	T–7th	
McMurry War Hawks (Lone Star Conference) (2014)
2014	McMurry	2–8	1–6	7th	
McMurry War Hawks (American Southwest Conference) (2015–2018)
2015	McMurry	4–6	0–0	N/A	
2016	McMurry	4–5	2–4	5th	
2017	McMurry	2–8	2–7	T–7th	
2018	McMurry	2–8	2–7	T–7th	
McMurry:		14–35	7–24		
Saint Mary Spires (Kansas Collegiate Athletic Conference) (2020–2025)
2020–21	Saint Mary	0–4	0–4		
2021	Saint Mary	3–7	3–7	8th	
2022	Saint Mary	4–7	4–6	7th	
2023	Saint Mary	3–8	2–4	T–4th (Bissell)	
2024	Saint Mary	1–9	0–5	6th (Bissell)	
2025	Saint Mary	3–8	1–4	5th (Bissell)	
Saint Mary:		52–97	44–77		
Total:		66–132			
