= 2014 Florida Tech Panthers football team =

American college football season

2014 Florida Tech Panthers football
- Conference: Gulf South Conference
- Record: 6–5 (3–4 GSC)
- Head coach: Steve Englehart (2nd season)
- Offensive coordinator: Jayson Martin (2nd season)
- Defensive coordinator: Willie Tillman (2nd season)
- Home stadium: Pirate Stadium at Palm Bay High School

2014 Gulf South Conference football standings
| | Conf. | | | Overall |
| Team | W | | L | W | | L |
|---|---|---|---|---|---|---|
| No. 13 Delta State +^ | 6 | – | 1 | 9 | – | 2 |
| No. 16 North Alabama +^ | 6 | – | 1 | 9 | – | 2 |
| No. 6 West Georgia ^ | 5 | – | 2 | 12 | – | 3 |
| No. 10 Valdosta State ^ | 5 | – | 2 | 10 | – | 3 |
| Florida Tech | 3 | – | 4 | 6 | – | 5 |
| West Alabama | 2 | – | 5 | 5 | – | 6 |
| Shorter | 1 | – | 6 | 3 | – | 8 |
| Mississippi College # | 0 | – | 7 | 1 | – | 9 |
+ – Conference co-champions; ^ – NCAA Division II playoff participant; # – Provisional Division II member; Rankings from AFCA poll

The 2014 Florida Tech Panthers football team represented the Florida Institute of Technology (FIT) during the 2014 NCAA Division II football season. They were led by head coach Steve Englehart, who was in his second year at Florida Tech. The Panthers played their home games at Pirate Stadium, approximately one mile from the Florida Tech campus and were a member of the Gulf South Conference. The 2014 season was the Panthers' second, after having football approved at FIT in April, 2010.

The Panthers would record the first winning season in program history at 6-5. Highlights included the program's first ever win over a ranked team in a 37-31 victory over #12 Tarleton State at AT&T Stadium in Arlington, Texas as part of the Lone Star Football Festival , their first ever road win in GSC play thanks to a last second 33-32 win at West Alabama and clinching a winning record on a 41-yard Hail Mary touchdown pass from Mark Cato to Xavier Milton as time expired to defeat Shorter, 34-30.

== Schedule ==
| Date | Time | Opponent | Site | TV | Result | Attendance |
|---|---|---|---|---|---|---|
| September 6 | 7:00 pm | at Stetson* | Spec Martin Stadium; DeLand, FL | | W 54–12 | 4,042 |
| September 13 | 6:00 pm | Ave Maria* | Pirate Stadium; Melbourne, FL | | W 42–6 | 4,050 |
| September 20 | 6:00 pm | vs. No. 12 Tarleton State* | AT&T Stadium; Arlington, TX (Lone Star Football Festival) | | W 37-31 | 13,024 |
| September 27 | 4:00 pm | at No. 15 (FCS) Bethune-Cookman* | Municipal Stadium; Daytona Beach, FL | | L 33–34 | 8,431 |
| October 2 | 7:00 pm | No. 11 Delta State | Pirate Stadium; Melbourne, FL | ESPN3 | L 20–58 | 2,875 |
| October 11 | 7:00 pm | at West Alabama | Tiger Stadium; Livingston, AL | | W 33–32 | 3,250 |
| October 18 | 6:00 pm | No. 4 North Alabama | Pirate Stadium; Melbourne, FL | | L 31–34 | 3,129 |
| October 25 | 1:00 pm | Mississippi College^{†} | Pirate Stadium; Melbourne, FL | | W 44–9 | 3,200 |
| November 1 | 12:00 pm | at Shorter | Barron Stadium; Rome, GA | | W 34–30 | 2,250 |
| November 8 | 2:00 pm | at West Georgia* | University Stadium; Carrollton, GA | ESPN3 | L 35–49 | 4,610 |
| November 15 | 6:00 pm | No. 25 Valdosta State | Pirate Stadium; Melbourne, FL | | L 29–31 | 4,126 |
*Non-conference game; ^{†}Homecoming; Rankings from Coaches' Poll released prior to the game

== Game summaries ==
=== At Stetson ===
| | 1 | 2 | 3 | 4 | Total |
|---|---|---|---|---|---|
| Panthers | 30 | 7 | 10 | 7 | 54 |
| Hatters | 0 | 0 | 0 | 12 | 12 |

=== Ave Maria ===
| | 1 | 2 | 3 | 4 | Total |
|---|---|---|---|---|---|
| Gyrenes | 0 | 0 | 6 | 0 | 6 |
| Panthers | 14 | 0 | 28 | 0 | 42 |

=== Tarleton State ===
| | 1 | 2 | 3 | 4 | Total |
|---|---|---|---|---|---|
| Panthers | 7 | 14 | 7 | 9 | 37 |
| Texans | 14 | 10 | 0 | 7 | 31 |

=== At Bethune-Cookman ===
| | 1 | 2 | 3 | 4 | Total |
|---|---|---|---|---|---|
| Panthers | 7 | 7 | 10 | 9 | 33 |
| Wildcats | 7 | 13 | 0 | 14 | 34 |

=== Delta State ===
| | 1 | 2 | 3 | 4 | Total |
|---|---|---|---|---|---|
| Statesmen | 7 | 16 | 28 | 7 | 58 |
| Panthers | 7 | 13 | 0 | 0 | 20 |

=== At West Alabama ===
| | 1 | 2 | 3 | 4 | Total |
|---|---|---|---|---|---|
| Panthers | 6 | 7 | 7 | 13 | 33 |
| Tigers | 10 | 10 | 3 | 9 | 32 |

=== North Alabama ===
| | 1 | 2 | 3 | 4 | Total |
|---|---|---|---|---|---|
| Lions | 10 | 7 | 10 | 7 | 34 |
| Panthers | 0 | 10 | 14 | 7 | 31 |

=== Mississippi College ===
| | 1 | 2 | 3 | 4 | Total |
|---|---|---|---|---|---|
| Choctaws | 6 | 0 | 3 | 0 | 9 |
| Panthers | 14 | 13 | 7 | 10 | 44 |

=== At Shorter ===
| | 1 | 2 | 3 | 4 | Total |
|---|---|---|---|---|---|
| Panthers | 0 | 0 | 14 | 20 | 34 |
| Hawks | 0 | 10 | 0 | 20 | 30 |

=== At West Georgia ===
| | 1 | 2 | 3 | 4 | Total |
|---|---|---|---|---|---|
| Panthers | 7 | 14 | 7 | 7 | 35 |
| Wolves | 21 | 7 | 0 | 21 | 49 |

=== Valdosta State ===
| | 1 | 2 | 3 | 4 | Total |
|---|---|---|---|---|---|
| Blazers | 3 | 14 | 7 | 7 | 31 |
| Panthers | 3 | 6 | 0 | 20 | 29 |

== Awards and milestones ==
=== Gulf South Conference honors ===
Nine players from Florida Tech were honored as All-GSC selections by the league's coaches. Wide Receiver Xavier Milton was named the GSC Co-Offensive Player of the Year with West Alabama QB Kyle Caldwell, becoming the first Panther to receive the honor. Quarterback Mark Cato became the first of two consecutive Panthers to win GSC Offensive Freshman of the Year with Antwuan Haynes winning it the following year. Steve Englehart was named GSC Co-Coach of the Year with Delta State's Todd Cooley and would go on to win the award outright in 2015.

- Gulf South Conference Co-Offensive Player of the Year: WR Xavier Milton
- Gulf South Conference Offensive Freshman of the Year: QB Mark Cato
- Gulf South Conference Co-Coach of the Year: Steve Englehart

==== Gulf South Conference All-Conference First Team ====
- Trevor Sand, RB
- Xavier Milton, WR
- Gabe Hughes, TE
- J.J. Sanders, LB

==== Gulf South Conference All-Conference Second Team ====
- Mark Cato, QB
- Ramsey Sellers, C
- Matt Garcia, T
- Chris Stapleton, LB
- Manny Abad, DB

==== Gulf South Conference offensive player of the week ====
- September 8: Mark Cato
- November 3: Xavier Milton

==== Gulf South Conference defensive player of the week ====
- September 22: J.J. Sanders
- September 29: Chris Stapleton
- November 3: J.J. Sanders

==== Gulf South Conference freshman of the week ====
- September 8: Mark Cato
- September 15: Mark Cato Mark Cato
- September 22: Mark Cato
- September 28: Mark Cato
- October 13: Mark Cato
- October 20: Terrance Bynum
- October 27: Mark Cato
- November 3: Mark Cato
- November 17: Mark Cato

=== School records ===
- Most passing yards in a single season: 2,962, Mark Cato
- Most rushing yards in a single season: 1,105, Trevor Sand
- Most receiving yards in a single season: 1,116, Xavier Milton
- Most passing touchdowns in a single season: 32, Mark Cato
- Most sacks in a single season: 8, J.J. Sanders
- Most tackles for loss in a single season: 21, J.J. Sanders
- Most tackles for loss: 4, J.J. Sanders (October 18, 2014)
