= 2014 NCAA Division II football season =

American college football season

- Total No. of teams: 171
- Regular season: September 4 – November 15, 2014
- Playoffs: November 22 – December 20, 2014
- National Championship: Sporting Park, Kansas City, KS December 20, 2014
- Champion: CSU Pueblo (1)
- Harlon Hill Trophy: Jason Vander Laan, Ferris State

The 2014 NCAA Division II football season, play of college football in the United States organized by the National Collegiate Athletic Association at the Division II level, began on September 4, 2014 and concluded with the National Championship Game of the NCAA Division II Football Championship on December 20, 2014 at Sporting Park in Kansas City, Kansas. CSU Pueblo won the national title with a 13–0 win over Minnesota State. This was CSU Pueblo's first national title.

== Conference changes and new programs ==
=== Membership changes ===
| School | Former conference | New conference |
|---|---|---|
| Kentucky Wesleyan Panthers | GLVC | Independent |
| Limestone Saints | New program | Independent |
| Lincoln Blue Tigers | MIAA | GLVC |
| McMurry War Hawks | Independent | Lone Star |
| Mississippi College Choctaws | American Southwest (D-III) | Gulf South |
| Paine Lions | New program | SIAC |
| South Dakota Mines Hardrockers | Independent | GNAC |
| Southwest Baptist Bearcats | MIAA | GLVC |

Azusa Pacific, Shorter, and Southern Nazarene completed their transitions to Division II and became eligible for the postseason. McMurry chose in January 2014 to abandon their transition to Division II in favor of a return to Division III, but still completed their Lone Star Conference schedule as planned.

== Conference standings ==
=== Super Region 1 ===
2014 Central Intercollegiate Athletic Association football standings
| | Conf. | | | Overall |
| Team | W | | L | W | | L |
|---|---|---|---|---|---|---|
Northern Division
| No. 22 Virginia State xy$^ | 7 | – | 0 | 10 | – | 3 |
| Virginia Union | 5 | – | 2 | 7 | – | 3 |
| Bowie State | 5 | – | 2 | 5 | – | 5 |
| Elizabeth City State | 3 | – | 4 | 4 | – | 6 |
| Chowan | 1 | – | 6 | 2 | – | 8 |
| Lincoln (PA) | 0 | – | 7 | 1 | – | 9 |
Southern Division
| No. 24 Winston-Salem State xy | 7 | – | 0 | 9 | – | 2 |
| Fayetteville State | 5 | – | 2 | 5 | – | 5 |
| St. Augustine's | 3 | – | 4 | 3 | – | 7 |
| Livingstone | 2 | – | 5 | 5 | – | 5 |
| Johnson C. Smith | 2 | – | 5 | 3 | – | 7 |
| Shaw Bears football | 2 | – | 5 | 3 | – | 7 |
Championship: Virginia State 21, Winston–Salem State 17
$ – Conference champion; x – Division champion/co-champions; y – Championship game participant; ^ – NCAA Division II playoff participant; Rankings from AFCA poll

2014 Mountain East Conference football standings
| | Conf. | | | Overall |
| Team | W | | L | W | | L |
|---|---|---|---|---|---|---|
| No. 5 Concord $^ | 10 | – | 0 | 13 | – | 1 |
| Shepherd | 8 | – | 2 | 8 | – | 2 |
| Charleston (WV) | 7 | – | 3 | 8 | – | 3 |
| Notre Dame (OH) | 7 | – | 3 | 7 | – | 4 |
| West Liberty | 6 | – | 4 | 6 | – | 5 |
| Glenville State | 5 | – | 5 | 5 | – | 6 |
| West Virginia Wesleyan | 4 | – | 6 | 4 | – | 6 |
| Fairmont State | 3 | – | 7 | 3 | – | 7 |
| Urbana | 2 | – | 8 | 3 | – | 8 |
| Virginia–Wise # | 2 | – | 8 | 2 | – | 9 |
| West Virginia State | 1 | – | 9 | 2 | – | 9 |
$ – Conference champion; ^ – NCAA Division II playoff participant; # – Provisional NCAA Division II member; Rankings from AFCA poll

2014 Northeast-10 Conference football standings
| | Conf. | | | Overall |
| Team | W | | L | W | | L |
|---|---|---|---|---|---|---|
| American International y | 8 | – | 1 | 8 | – | 3 |
| LIU Post y$^ | 7 | – | 2 | 8 | – | 4 |
| Assumption | 6 | – | 3 | 7 | – | 4 |
| New Haven | 6 | – | 3 | 6 | – | 5 |
| Saint Anselm | 5 | – | 4 | 6 | – | 5 |
| Stonehill | 4 | – | 5 | 5 | – | 6 |
| Merrimack | 4 | – | 5 | 4 | – | 7 |
| Bentley | 3 | – | 6 | 5 | – | 6 |
| Southern Connecticut | 2 | – | 7 | 2 | – | 9 |
| Pace | 0 | – | 9 | 1 | – | 10 |
Championship: LIU Post 58, American International 25
$ – Conference champion; y – Championship game participant; ^ – NCAA Division II playoff participant

2014 Pennsylvania State Athletic Conference football standings
| | Conf. | | | Overall |
| Team | W | | L | W | | L |
|---|---|---|---|---|---|---|
East
| No. 12 Bloomsburg xy^ | 9 | – | 0 | 11 | – | 2 |
| No. 15 West Chester ^ | 8 | – | 1 | 11 | – | 2 |
| East Stroudsburg | 5 | – | 4 | 6 | – | 5 |
| Kutztown | 5 | – | 4 | 6 | – | 5 |
| Shippensburg | 5 | – | 4 | 6 | – | 5 |
| Lock Haven | 2 | – | 7 | 2 | – | 9 |
| Millersville | 1 | – | 8 | 1 | – | 10 |
| Cheyney | 0 | – | 9 | 0 | – | 11 |
West
| Slippery Rock xy$^ | 7 | – | 2 | 9 | – | 3 |
| Gannon x | 7 | – | 2 | 9 | – | 2 |
| California (PA) | 6 | – | 3 | 8 | – | 3 |
| Mercyhurst | 6 | – | 3 | 7 | – | 4 |
| IUP | 5 | – | 4 | 6 | – | 5 |
| Edinboro | 2 | – | 7 | 3 | – | 8 |
| Seton Hill | 2 | – | 7 | 3 | – | 8 |
| Clarion | 2 | – | 7 | 2 | – | 9 |
Championship: Slippery Rock 28, Bloomsburg 26
$ – Conference champion; x – Division champion/co-champions; y – Championship game participant; ^ – NCAA Division II playoff participant; Rankings from AFCA poll

=== Super Region 2 ===
2014 Gulf South Conference football standings
| | Conf. | | | Overall |
| Team | W | | L | W | | L |
|---|---|---|---|---|---|---|
| No. 13 Delta State +^ | 6 | – | 1 | 9 | – | 2 |
| No. 16 North Alabama +^ | 6 | – | 1 | 9 | – | 2 |
| No. 6 West Georgia ^ | 5 | – | 2 | 12 | – | 3 |
| No. 10 Valdosta State ^ | 5 | – | 2 | 10 | – | 3 |
| Florida Tech | 3 | – | 4 | 6 | – | 5 |
| West Alabama | 2 | – | 5 | 5 | – | 6 |
| Shorter | 1 | – | 6 | 3 | – | 8 |
| Mississippi College # | 0 | – | 7 | 1 | – | 9 |
+ – Conference co-champions; ^ – NCAA Division II playoff participant; # – Provisional Division II member; Rankings from AFCA poll

2014 South Atlantic Conference football standings
| | Conf. | | | Overall |
| Team | W | | L | W | | L |
|---|---|---|---|---|---|---|
| No. 8 Lenoir–Rhyne $^ | 7 | – | 0 | 11 | – | 1 |
| Carson–Newman | 5 | – | 2 | 7 | – | 3 |
| Tusculum | 4 | – | 3 | 6 | – | 5 |
| Catawba | 3 | – | 4 | 6 | – | 5 |
| Wingate | 3 | – | 4 | 6 | – | 5 |
| Newberry | 3 | – | 4 | 5 | – | 6 |
| Mars Hill | 3 | – | 4 | 4 | – | 6 |
| Brevard | 0 | – | 7 | 1 | – | 10 |
$ – Conference champion; ^ – NCAA Division II playoff participant; Rankings from AFCA poll

2014 Southern Intercollegiate Athletic Conference football standings
| | Conf. | | | Overall |
| Team | W | | L | W | | L |
|---|---|---|---|---|---|---|
East Division
| Albany State xy | 7 | – | 0 | 7 | – | 3 |
| Morehouse | 4 | – | 3 | 6 | – | 4 |
| Fort Valley State | 4 | – | 3 | 6 | – | 4 |
| Benedict | 2 | – | 5 | 4 | – | 6 |
| Clark Atlanta | 1 | – | 6 | 3 | – | 7 |
| Paine | 1 | – | 6 | 2 | – | 8 |
West Division
| Tuskegee xy$^ | 7 | – | 0 | 9 | – | 3 |
| Miles | 5 | – | 2 | 6 | – | 4 |
| Stillman | 4 | – | 3 | 5 | – | 5 |
| Central State (OH) | 3 | – | 4 | 4 | – | 6 |
| Kentucky State | 2 | – | 5 | 3 | – | 7 |
| Lane | 1 | – | 6 | 1 | – | 8 |
Championship: Tuskegee 47, Albany State 41
$ – Conference champion; x – Division champion/co-champions; y – Championship game participant; ^ – NCAA Division II playoff participant

2014 NCAA Division II Super Region 2 independents football records
| | Conf. | | | Overall |
| Team | W | | L | W | | L |
|---|---|---|---|---|---|---|
| North Greenville | | – | | 7 | – | 5 |
| UNC Pembroke | | – | | 2 | – | 8 |
| Limestone | | – | | 2 | – | 9 |

=== Super Region 3 ===
2014 Great American Conference football standings
| | Conf. | | | Overall |
| Team | W | | L | W | | L |
|---|---|---|---|---|---|---|
| No. 9 Ouachita Baptist $^ | 10 | – | 0 | 10 | – | 1 |
| No. 17 Harding ^ | 9 | – | 1 | 9 | – | 2 |
| No. 25 Henderson State | 8 | – | 2 | 9 | – | 2 |
| SE Oklahoma State # | 6 | – | 4 | 7 | – | 5 |
| East Central # | 6 | – | 4 | 6 | – | 5 |
| Southern Arkansas | 5 | – | 5 | 5 | – | 5 |
| NW Oklahoma State * | 3 | – | 7 | 3 | – | 7 |
| SW Oklahoma State | 3 | – | 7 | 3 | – | 7 |
| Arkansas Tech | 3 | – | 7 | 3 | – | 8 |
| Arkansas–Monticello | 2 | – | 8 | 2 | – | 8 |
| Southern Nazarene | 0 | – | 10 | 0 | – | 11 |
$ – Conference champion; ^ – NCAA Division II playoff participant; # – bowl game participant (East Central: C.H.A.M.P.S. Heart of Texas Bowl, SE Oklahoma State: Live United Texarkana Bowl) * – Provisional NCAA Division II member; Rankings from AFCA poll

2014 Great Northwest Athletic Conference football standings
| | Conf. | | | Overall |
| Team | W | | L | W | | L |
|---|---|---|---|---|---|---|
| No. 23 Azusa Pacific $ | 6 | – | 0 | 10 | – | 1 |
| Humboldt State | 4 | – | 2 | 8 | – | 2 |
| Central Washington | 4 | – | 2 | 7 | – | 4 |
| Western Oregon | 4 | – | 2 | 6 | – | 5 |
| Simon Fraser | 2 | – | 4 | 2 | – | 9 |
| South Dakota Mines | 1 | – | 5 | 2 | – | 9 |
| Dixie State | 0 | – | 6 | 1 | – | 10 |
$ – Conference champion; ^ – NCAA Division II playoff participant; Rankings from AFCA poll

2014 Mid-America Intercollegiate Athletics Association football standings
| | Conf. | | | Overall |
| Team | W | | L | W | | L |
|---|---|---|---|---|---|---|
| No. 7 Pittsburg State +^ | 10 | – | 1 | 11 | – | 2 |
| No. 14 NW Missouri State +^ | 10 | – | 1 | 10 | – | 2 |
| Central Oklahoma # | 8 | – | 3 | 8 | – | 4 |
| Central Missouri # | 7 | – | 4 | 8 | – | 4 |
| Fort Hays State | 7 | – | 4 | 7 | – | 4 |
| Missouri Western | 7 | – | 4 | 7 | – | 4 |
| Emporia State | 4 | – | 7 | 4 | – | 7 |
| Missouri Southern | 4 | – | 7 | 4 | – | 7 |
| Washburn | 4 | – | 7 | 4 | – | 7 |
| Nebraska–Kearney | 3 | – | 8 | 3 | – | 8 |
| Lindenwood | 2 | – | 9 | 2 | – | 9 |
| Northeastern State | 0 | – | 11 | 0 | – | 11 |
$ – Conference champion; ^ – NCAA Division II playoff participant; # – bowl game participant (Central Oklahoma: Mineral Water Bowl, Central Missouri: Live United Texarkana Bowl); Rankings from AFCA poll

2014 Northern Sun Intercollegiate Conference football standings
| | Conf. | | | Overall |
| Team | W | | L | W | | L |
|---|---|---|---|---|---|---|
North Division
| No. 3 Minnesota–Duluth +^ | 11 | – | 0 | 13 | – | 1 |
| Northern State | 8 | – | 3 | 8 | – | 3 |
| St. Cloud State | 6 | – | 5 | 6 | – | 5 |
| Mary | 5 | – | 6 | 5 | – | 6 |
| Minnesota State–Moorhead | 4 | – | 7 | 4 | – | 7 |
| Bemidji State | 3 | – | 8 | 3 | – | 8 |
| Minot State | 1 | – | 10 | 1 | – | 10 |
| Minnesota–Crookston | 0 | – | 11 | 0 | – | 11 |
South Division
| No. 2 Minnesota State +^ | 11 | – | 0 | 14 | – | 1 |
| No. 18 Sioux Falls # | 10 | – | 1 | 11 | – | 1 |
| Concordia–St. Paul | 5 | – | 6 | 5 | – | 6 |
| Augustana (SD) | 6 | – | 5 | 6 | – | 5 |
| Wayne State (NE) | 5 | – | 6 | 5 | – | 6 |
| Upper Iowa | 6 | – | 5 | 6 | – | 5 |
| SW Minnesota State | 3 | – | 8 | 3 | – | 8 |
| Winona State | 4 | – | 7 | 4 | – | 7 |
+ – Conference co-champions; ^ – NCAA Division II playoff participant; # – Mineral Water Bowl participant; Rankings from AFCA poll

=== Super Region 4 ===
2014 Great Lakes Intercollegiate Athletic Conference football standings
| | Conf. | | | Overall |
| Team | W | | L | W | | L |
|---|---|---|---|---|---|---|
| No. 11 Ferris State $^ | 10 | – | 0 | 11 | – | 1 |
| No. 4 Ohio Dominican ^ | 9 | – | 1 | 11 | – | 2 |
| No. 21 Michigan Tech ^ | 9 | – | 1 | 9 | – | 2 |
| Ashland | 8 | – | 2 | 8 | – | 2 |
| Wayne State (MI) | 6 | – | 4 | 7 | – | 4 |
| Grand Valley State | 6 | – | 4 | 6 | – | 5 |
| Findlay | 4 | – | 6 | 5 | – | 6 |
| Northwood | 4 | – | 6 | 5 | – | 6 |
| Tiffin | 4 | – | 6 | 5 | – | 6 |
| Hillsdale | 4 | – | 6 | 4 | – | 7 |
| Lake Erie | 3 | – | 7 | 4 | – | 7 |
| Walsh | 3 | – | 7 | 4 | – | 7 |
| Northern Michigan | 2 | – | 8 | 3 | – | 8 |
| Saginaw Valley State | 2 | – | 8 | 2 | – | 9 |
| Malone | 1 | – | 9 | 1 | – | 10 |
$ – Conference champion; ^ – NCAA Division II playoff participant; Rankings from AFCA poll

2014 Great Lakes Valley Conference football standings
| | Conf. | | | Overall |
| Team | W | | L | W | | L |
|---|---|---|---|---|---|---|
| Indianapolis $ | 7 | – | 1 | 9 | – | 2 |
| Saint Joseph's (IN) | 5 | – | 3 | 8 | – | 3 |
| Truman State | 5 | – | 3 | 6 | – | 4 |
| McKendree | 5 | – | 3 | 5 | – | 6 |
| William Jewell | 5 | – | 3 | 5 | – | 6 |
| Quincy | 4 | – | 4 | 6 | – | 5 |
| Missouri S&T | 3 | – | 5 | 4 | – | 7 |
| Southwest Baptist | 1 | – | 7 | 4 | – | 7 |
| Lincoln (MO) | 1 | – | 7 | 2 | – | 9 |
$ – Conference champion; ^ – NCAA Division II playoff participant; Rankings from AP Poll

2014 Lone Star Conference football standings
| | Conf. | | | Overall |
| Team | W | | L | W | | L |
|---|---|---|---|---|---|---|
| Texas A&M–Commerce # $ | 6 | – | 1 | 9 | – | 3 |
| No. 20 Angelo State ^ | 5 | – | 2 | 9 | – | 3 |
| Midwestern State | 5 | – | 2 | 6 | – | 4 |
| West Texas A&M † | 4 | – | 3 | 6 | – | 5 |
| Tarleton State | 4 | – | 3 | 5 | – | 5 |
| Eastern New Mexico | 3 | – | 4 | 7 | – | 4 |
| McMurry @ | 1 | – | 6 | 2 | – | 8 |
| Texas A&M–Kingsville | 0 | – | 7 | 2 | – | 9 |
$ – Conference champion; ^ – NCAA Division II playoff participant; # – C.H.A.M.P.S. Heart of Texas Bowl participant @– Provisional Division III member † – West Texas A&M vacated 4 wins, including 3 conference wins; Rankings from AFCA poll

2014 Rocky Mountain Athletic Conference football standings
| | Conf. | | | Overall |
| Team | W | | L | W | | L |
|---|---|---|---|---|---|---|
| No. 1 CSU Pueblo +^ | 8 | – | 1 | 14 | – | 1 |
| No. 19 Colorado Mines +^ | 8 | – | 1 | 10 | – | 2 |
| Chadron State | 7 | – | 2 | 8 | – | 3 |
| Colorado Mesa | 5 | – | 4 | 6 | – | 5 |
| Western New Mexico | 4 | – | 5 | 5 | – | 6 |
| Adams State | 3 | – | 6 | 4 | – | 7 |
| Western State (CO) | 3 | – | 6 | 4 | – | 7 |
| New Mexico Highlands | 3 | – | 6 | 3 | – | 8 |
| Black Hills State | 2 | – | 7 | 3 | – | 8 |
| Fort Lewis | 2 | – | 7 | 3 | – | 8 |
+ – Conference co-champions; ^ – NCAA Division II playoff participant; Rankings from AFCA poll

2014 NCAA Division II Super Region 4 independents football records
| | Conf. | | | Overall |
| Team | W | | L | W | | L |
|---|---|---|---|---|---|---|
| OK Panhandle State | | – | | 7 | – | 3 |
| Alderson Broaddus | | – | | 7 | – | 4 |
| Kentucky Wesleyan | | – | | 7 | – | 4 |

== Postseason ==
The 2014 NCAA Division II Football Championship Postseason involved 24 schools playing in a single-elimination tournament to determine the national champion of men's NCAA Division II college football. The tournament began on November 22, 2014 and concluded on December 20, 2014 with the 2014 NCAA Division II National Football Championship game at Sporting Park in Kansas City, Kansas.

=== Format ===
Six teams selected per super regional made up the field of 24 teams.

Eight first-round games were conducted on the campus of one of the competing institutions. In addition, two teams per super regional earned first-round byes. The first-round winners advanced to face a bye team in their super regional in the second round on the campus of team that received the bye. Second-round winners met in the quarterfinals at various campus sites. Quarterfinal winners advanced to play in the semifinals on the campus of one of the competing institutions. The championship took place at Sporting Park.

=== Bracket ===
First Round; November 22; Campus sites | Second Round; November 29; Campus sites
1 | Concord * | 51
4 | West Chester | 36
4 | West Chester** | 46
5 | Slippery Rock | 20
Super Region 1
2 | Bloomsburg * | 35
3 | Virginia State | 14
3 | Virginia State* | 28
6 | LIU Post | 17
1 | Ouachita Baptist* | 45
4 | Minnesota-Duluth | 48
4 | Minnesota–Duluth* | 25
5 | Northwest Missouri State | 21
Super Region 3
2 | Minnesota State * | 24
3 | Pittsburg State | 21
3 | Pittsburg State* | 59
6 | Harding | 42
1 | Lenoir–Rhyne* | 21
5 | Valdosta State | 23
4 | North Alabama* | 31
5 | Valdosta State | 33
Super Region 2
2 | Delta State* | 27
6 | West Georgia | 37
3 | Tuskegee* | 17
6 | West Georgia | 20
1 | Ferris State* | 33
5 | Ohio Dominican | 46
4 | Colorado Mines* | 23
5 | Ohio Dominican | 34
Super Region 4
2 | CSU Pueblo* | 52
6 | Angelo State | 14
3 | Michigan Tech* | 41
6 | Angelo State | 42

Quarterfinals; December 6 Campus sites
1 | Concord* | 32
2 | Bloomsburg | 26
4 | Minnesota–Duluth | 17
2 | Minnesota State* | 44
5 | Valdosta State* | 17
6 | West Georgia | 31
5 | Ohio Dominican | 28
2 | CSU Pueblo* | 31

Semifinals; December 13; Campus sites
1 | Concord | 13
2 | Minnesota State* | 47
6 | West Georgia | 7
2 | CSU Pueblo* | 10

National Championship; December 20; Sporting Park, Kansas City, Kansas
2 | Minnesota State | 0
2 | CSU Pueblo | 13

* Home team † Overtime Winner

== See also ==
- 2014 NCAA Division I FBS football season
- 2014 NCAA Division I FCS football season
- 2014 NCAA Division III football season
- 2014 NAIA football season
