= 2014 Texas A&M–Commerce Lions football team =

American college football season

2014 Texas A&M–Commerce Lions football

LSC champion

C.H.A.M.P.S. Heart of Texas Bowl, W 72–21 vs. East Central
- Conference: Lone Star Conference
- Record: 9–3 (6–1 LSC)
- Head coach: Colby Carthel (2nd season)
- Offensive coordinator: Matt Storm (2nd season)
- Offensive scheme: Spread
- Defensive coordinator: Justin Deason (2nd season)
- Base defense: 3–4
- Home stadium: Memorial Stadium

2014 Lone Star Conference football standings
	Conf.			Overall
Team	W		L	W		L
Texas A&M–Commerce # $	6	–	1	9	–	3
No. 20 Angelo State ^	5	–	2	9	–	3
Midwestern State	5	–	2	6	–	4
West Texas A&M †	4	–	3	6	–	5
Tarleton State	4	–	3	5	–	5
Eastern New Mexico	3	–	4	7	–	4
McMurry @	1	–	6	2	–	8
Texas A&M–Kingsville	0	–	7	2	–	9
$ – Conference champion; ^ – NCAA Division II playoff participant; # – C.H.A.M.P.S. Heart of Texas Bowl participant @– Provisional Division III member † – West Texas A&M vacated 4 wins, including 3 conference wins; Rankings from AFCA poll

The 2014 Texas A&M–Commerce Lions football team represented Texas A&M University–Commerce in the 2014 NCAA Division II football season. They were led by head coach Colby Carthel, who was in his second season at Texas A&M–Commerce. The Lions played their home games at Memorial Stadium and were members of the Lone Star Conference (LSC). With a 9–3 record, the Lions were outright Lone Star champions for the first time since 1990. They were selected to participate in the C.H.A.M.P.S. Heart of Texas Bowl, where they defeated East Central in their first postseason win since the 1991 NCAA Division II playoffs.

== Preseason ==
=== LSC media poll ===
The LSC preseason prediction poll was released in late July. The Lions were predicted to finish sixth in the conference.

== Schedule ==
Date	Time	Opponent	Rank	Site	Result	Attendance
September 4	7:00 p.m.	East Texas Baptist*		Memorial Stadium; Commerce, TX	W 98–20	6,327
September 13	6:00 p.m.	Stephen F. Austin*		Homer Bryce Stadium; Nacogdoches, TX	L 17–38	7,821
September 20	10:00 a.m.	vs. Texas A&M–Kingsville		AT&T Stadium; Arlington, TX (Chennault Cup)	W 55–20	13,024
September 27	4:00 p.m.	at Eastern New Mexico		Greyhound Stadium; Portales, NM	W 48–32	2,347
October 4	7:00 p.m.	Tarleton State		Memorial Stadium; Commerce, TX (President's Cup)	W 53–25	6,103
October 11	7:00 p.m.	at Angelo State		LeGrand Sports Complex; San Angelo, TX	W 41–40	4,863
October 18	7:00 p.m.	West Texas A&M	No. 23	Memorial Stadium; Commerce, TX (East Texas vs. West Texas)	W 48–21	7,048
October 25	7:00 p.m.	at Midwestern State	No. 22	Memorial Stadium; Wichita Falls, TX	L 37–40 ^{OT}	8,521
November 1	4:00 p.m.	McMurry		Memorial Stadium; Commerce, TX	W 91–13	9,496
November 8	4:00 p.m.	Tarleton State*		Memorial Stadium; Commerce, TX (LSC Playoffs)	W 56–49	4,556
November 15	4:00 p.m.	Angelo State*	No. 24	Memorial Stadium; Commerce, TX (LSC Playoffs)	L 33–35	3,227
December 6	6:00 p.m.	vs. East Central*	No. 24	Bulldawg Stadium; Copperas Cove, TX (C.H.A.M.P.S. Heart of Texas Bowl)	W 72–21	17,21
*Non-conference game; Rankings from AFCA Poll released prior to the game; All times are in Central time

== Game summaries ==
=== West Texas A&M ===
	1	2	3	4	Total
Buffaloes	0	14	0	7	21
No. 23 Lions	9	14	25	0	48

Statistics	WTAMU	TAMUC
First downs	24	21
Total yards	398	495
Rushing yards	245	113
Passing yards	153	382
Turnovers	4	1
Time of possession	27:23	31:24

Team	Category	Player	Statistics
West Texas A&M	Passing	Preston Rabb	17/38, 153 yards, TD, 3 INT
West Texas A&M	Rushing	Geremy Alridge-Mitchell	28 rushes, 160 yards, 2 TD
West Texas A&M	Receiving	Anthony Johnson	5 receptions, 58 yards
Texas A&M–Commerce	Passing	Tyrik Rollison	24/33, 355 yards, 3 TD, INT
Texas A&M–Commerce	Rushing	Richard Cooper	16 rushes, 81 yards
Texas A&M–Commerce	Receiving	Ricky Collins	9 receptions, 153 yards, 2 TD

=== McMurry ===
	1	2	3	4	Total
War Hawks	0	6	0	7	13
Lions	21	28	21	21	91

Statistics	MCM	TAMUC
First downs	10	20
Total yards	318	582
Rushing yards	18	263
Passing yards	300	319
Turnovers	3	3
Time of possession	38:04	21:56

Team	Category	Player	Statistics
McMurry	Passing	Cy Ward	10/17, 116 yards, 2 INT
McMurry	Rushing	Chris Simpson Jr.	11 rushes, 41 yards
McMurry	Receiving	Jeret Smith	6 receptions, 195 yards, 2 TD
Texas A&M–Commerce	Passing	Tyrik Rollison	7/10, 203 yards, 3 TD, 2 INT
Texas A&M–Commerce	Rushing	Joe Bergeron	9 rushes, 86 yards, TD
Texas A&M–Commerce	Receiving	Vernon Johnson	3 receptions, 118 yards, TD

== Postseason awards ==
=== All-Americans ===
- Ricky Collins, First Team Receiver
- Vernon Johnson, First Team Receiver
- Saul Martinez, Second Team Placekicer
- Toni Pulu, Third Team Defensive Line

=== LSC Superlatives ===
- Defensive Player of the Year: Toni Pulu
- Receiver of The Year: Vernon Johnson

=== LSC First Team ===
- Ricky Collins, Wide Receiver
- Ron Fields, Cornerback
- Vernon Johnson, Wide Receiver
- Saul Martinez, Kicker
- Toni Pulu, Defensive End
- Charlie Tuaau, Defensive Tackle

=== LSC Second Team ===
- Steven Baker, Safety
- Joe Bergeron, Running Back
- Elwood Clement, Offensive Tackle
- Izzy Eziakor, Safety
- Tyrik Rollison, Quarterback
- Davarus Shores, Linebacker
- Seth Smith, Wide Receiver
- Charles Woods, Linebacker

=== LSC Honorable Mention ===
- Tyree Barton, Linebacker
- Michael Boyefio, Center
- Jordan DeCorte, Offensive Guard
- Ashton Dorsey, Defensive End
- Rumzee Fakhouri, Offensive Tackle
- Shawn Hooks, Return Specialist
- Traven Johnson, Cornerback
- Taylor Peasha, Tight End
- Cole Pitts, Linebacker
- Cameron Rogers, Deep Snapper
- Shane Thompson, Offensive Guard
- Chase Thrasher, Punter
