= 2014 CSU Pueblo ThunderWolves football team =

American college football season

2014 CSU Pueblo ThunderWolves football

NCAA Division II champion RMAC co-champion

NCAA Division II Championship Game, W 13–0 vs. Minnesota State
- Conference: Rocky Mountain Athletic Conference

Ranking
- AFCA: No. 1
- Record: 14–1 (8–1 RMAC)
- Head coach: John Wristen (7th season)
- Offensive coordinator: Daren Wilkinson (2nd season)
- Offensive scheme: Pro-style pistol
- Defensive coordinator: Hunter Hughes (7th season)
- Base defense: 3–4
- Home stadium: ThunderBowl

2014 Rocky Mountain Athletic Conference football standings
| | Conf. | | | Overall |
| Team | W | | L | W | | L |
|---|---|---|---|---|---|---|
| No. 1 CSU Pueblo +^ | 8 | – | 1 | 14 | – | 1 |
| No. 19 Colorado Mines +^ | 8 | – | 1 | 10 | – | 2 |
| Chadron State | 7 | – | 2 | 8 | – | 3 |
| Colorado Mesa | 5 | – | 4 | 6 | – | 5 |
| Western New Mexico | 4 | – | 5 | 5 | – | 6 |
| Adams State | 3 | – | 6 | 4 | – | 7 |
| Western State (CO) | 3 | – | 6 | 4 | – | 7 |
| New Mexico Highlands | 3 | – | 6 | 3 | – | 8 |
| Black Hills State | 2 | – | 7 | 3 | – | 8 |
| Fort Lewis | 2 | – | 7 | 3 | – | 8 |
+ – Conference co-champions; ^ – NCAA Division II playoff participant; Rankings from AFCA poll

The 2014 CSU Pueblo ThunderWolves football team represented Colorado State University Pueblo as a member of the Rocky Mountain Athletic Conference (RMAC) during the 2014 NCAA Division II football season. Led by seventh-year head coach John Wristen, the ThunderWolves compiled an overall record of 14–1 with a mark of 8–1 in conference play, sharing the RMAC title with Colorado Mines. CSU Pueblo advanced to the NCAA Division II football championship, where, after a first-round bye, the ThunderWolves defeated Angelo State in the second round, Ohio Dominican in the quarterfinals, West Georgia in the semifinals, and Minnesota State in the championship game to win the program's first national championship. The team played home games at the ThunderBowl in Pueblo, Colorado.

== Schedule ==
| Date | Time | Opponent | Rank | Site | TV | Result | Attendance | Source |
|---|---|---|---|---|---|---|---|---|
| September 4 | 6:00 pm | No. 11 West Texas A&M* | No. 4 | ThunderBowl; Pueblo, CO | | W 35–6 | 7,321 | |
| September 13 | 6:30 pm | at No. 15 (FCS) Sam Houston State* | No. 2 | Bowers Stadium; Huntsville, TX | | W 47–21 | 9,678 | |
| September 20 | 1:00 pm | at Western State (CO) | No. 2 | Mountaineer Bowl; Gunnison, CO | | W 26–23 | 562 | |
| September 27 | 12:05 pm | at Western New Mexico | No. 2 | Altamirano Stadium; Silver City, NM | | W 45–7 | 425 | |
| October 4 | 6:00 pm | Adams State | No. 2 | ThunderBowl; Pueblo, CO | | W 17–7 | 8,670 | |
| October 11 | 12:00 pm | at Fort Lewis | No. 2 | Ray Dennison Memorial Field; Durango, CO | A1 | L 22–23 | 1,656 | |
| October 18 | 1:00 pm | Chadron State^{†} | No. 14 | ThunderBowl; Pueblo, CO | | W 41–13 | 8,926 | |
| October 25 | 12:00 pm | at No. 11 Colorado Mines | No. 12 | North Area Athletic Complex; Arvada, CO | | W 20–12 | 2,050 | |
| November 1 | 2:00 pm | Black Hills State | No. 9 | ThunderBowl; Pueblo, CO | | W 49–7 | 6,817 | |
| November 8 | 7:00 pm | at Colorado Mesa | No. 8 | Ralph Stocker Stadium; Grand Junction, CO | A1 HD | W 52–3 | 1,616 | |
| November 15 | 2:00 pm | New Mexico Highlands | No. 8 | ThunderBowl; Pueblo, CO | | W 44–21 | 4,239 | |
| November 29 | 12:00 pm | No. T–23 Angelo State* | No. 8 | ThunderBowl; Pueblo, CO (NCAA Division II Second Round) | | W 52–14 | 3,613 | |
| December 6 | 12:00 pm | No. 9 Ohio Dominican* | No. 8 | ThunderBowl; Pueblo, CO (NCAA Division II Quarterfinal) | | W 31–28 | 4,186 | |
| December 13 | 4:30 pm | No. 25 West Georgia* | No. 8 | ThunderBowl; Pueblo, CO (NCAA Division II Semifinal) | ESPN3 | W 10–7 | 7,236 | |
| December 20 | 2:00 pm | vs. No. 1 Minnesota State* | No. 8 | Sporting Park; Kansas City, MO (NCAA Division II Championship Game) | ESPN2 | W 13–0 | 6,762 | |
*Non-conference game; ^{†}Homecoming; Rankings from AFCA Poll released prior to the game; All times are in Mountain time

== Rankings ==
Ranking movements Legend: ██ Increase in ranking ██ Decrease in ranking ( ) = First-place votes
| | Week | | | | | | | | | | | | |
| Poll | Pre | 1 | 2 | 3 | 4 | 5 | 6 | 7 | 8 | 9 | 10 | 11 | Final |
|---|---|---|---|---|---|---|---|---|---|---|---|---|---|
| AFCA poll | 4 | 2 | 2 (6) | 2 (2) | 2 (1) | 2 (1) | 14 | 12 | 9 | 8 | 8 | 8 | 1 (31) |

== Game summaries ==
=== At No. 11 West Texas A&M ===
| | 1 | 2 | 3 | 4 | Total |
|---|---|---|---|---|---|
| No. 11 Buffaloes | 3 | 0 | 0 | 3 | 6 |
| No. 4 ThunderWolves | 14 | 7 | 7 | 7 | 35 |

| Statistics | WTAMU | CSUP |
|---|---|---|
| First downs | 16 | 19 |
| Total yards | 302 | 440 |
| Rushing yards | 94 | 163 |
| Passing yards | 208 | 277 |
| Turnovers | 3 | 1 |
| Time of possession | 27:15 | 32:45 |

| Team | Category | Player | Statistics |
|---|---|---|---|
| West Texas A&M | Passing | Preston Rabb | 25/49, 208 yards |
| West Texas A&M | Rushing | Venric Mark | 12 rushes, 58 yards |
| West Texas A&M | Receiving | Jarrian Rhone | 5 receptions, 72 yards |
| CSU Pueblo | Passing | Chris Bonner | 16/31, 277 yards, 4 TD, INT |
| CSU Pueblo | Rushing | Cameron McDondle | 21 rushes, 83 yards |
| CSU Pueblo | Receiving | Paul Browning | 4 receptions, 102 yards, TD |

=== At No. 15 (FCS) Sam Houston State ===
| | 1 | 2 | 3 | 4 | Total |
|---|---|---|---|---|---|
| No. 2 ThunderWolves | 14 | 13 | 17 | 3 | 47 |
| No. 15 (FCS) Bearkats | 0 | 0 | 7 | 14 | 21 |

| Statistics | CSUP | SHSU |
|---|---|---|
| First downs | 20 | 17 |
| Total yards | 446 | 231 |
| Rushing yards | 187 | 85 |
| Passing yards | 259 | 146 |
| Turnovers | 0 | 2 |
| Time of possession | 36:54 | 23:06 |

| Team | Category | Player | Statistics |
|---|---|---|---|
| CSU Pueblo | Passing | Chris Bonner | 20/32, 255 yards, 3 TD |
| CSU Pueblo | Rushing | Cameron McDondle | 14 rushes, 116 yards, 2 TD |
| CSU Pueblo | Receiving | Paul Browning | 7 receptions, 98 yards, TD |
| Sam Houston State | Passing | Don King III | 5/7, 74 yards, TD, INT |
| Sam Houston State | Rushing | Keshawn Hill | 12 rushes, 55 yards, TD |
| Sam Houston State | Receiving | LaDarius Brown | 3 receptions, 47 yards |

=== Vs. No. 1 Minnesota State (NCAA Division II Championship Game) ===
| | 1 | 2 | 3 | 4 | Total |
|---|---|---|---|---|---|
| No. 8 ThunderWolves | 0 | 10 | 3 | 0 | 13 |
| No. 1 Mavericks | 0 | 0 | 0 | 0 | 0 |

| Statistics | CSUP | MSU |
|---|---|---|
| First downs | 16 | 12 |
| Total yards | 327 | 265 |
| Rushing yards | 136 | 105 |
| Passing yards | 191 | 160 |
| Turnovers | 1 | 0 |
| Time of possession | 32:11 | 27:49 |

| Team | Category | Player | Statistics |
|---|---|---|---|
| CSU Pueblo | Passing | Chris Bonner | 17/30, 191 yards, TD, INT |
| CSU Pueblo | Rushing | Cameron McDondle | 28 rushes, 113 yards |
| CSU Pueblo | Receiving | Paul Browning | 5 receptions, 84 yards, TD |
| Minnesota State | Passing | Ricky Lloyd | 15/21, 99 yards |
| Minnesota State | Rushing | Ricky Lloyd | 12 rushes, 67 yards |
| Minnesota State | Receiving | Dorian Buford | 5 receptions, 50 yards |
