= 2014 North Alabama Lions football team =

American college football season

2014 North Alabama Lions football

GSC co-champion

NCAA Division II First Round, L 31–33 vs. Valdosta State
- Conference: Gulf South Conference
- Record: 9–2 (6–1 GSC)
- Head coach: Bobby Wallace (13th season)
- Offensive coordinator: Cody Gross (3rd season)
- Defensive coordinator: Chris Willis (3rd season)
- Home stadium: Braly Municipal Stadium

2014 Gulf South Conference football standings
	Conf.			Overall
Team	W		L	W		L
No. 13 Delta State +^	6	–	1	9	–	2
No. 16 North Alabama +^	6	–	1	9	–	2
No. 6 West Georgia ^	5	–	2	12	–	3
No. 10 Valdosta State ^	5	–	2	10	–	3
Florida Tech	3	–	4	6	–	5
West Alabama	2	–	5	5	–	6
Shorter	1	–	6	3	–	8
Mississippi College #	0	–	7	1	–	9
+ – Conference co-champions; ^ – NCAA Division II playoff participant; # – Provisional Division II member; Rankings from AFCA poll

The 2014 North Alabama Lions football team represented the University of North Alabama as a member of the Gulf South Conference (GSC) during the 2014 NCAA Division II football season. Led by 13th-year head coach Bobby Wallace, the Lions compiled an overall record of 9–2 with a mark of 6–1 conference play, sharing the GSC title with Delta State. North Alabama advanced to the NCAA Division II football championship playoffs, where the Lions lost in the first round to fellow GSC member Valdosta State, by the score of 33–31. The team played home games at Braly Municipal Stadium in Florence, Alabama.

== Schedule ==
Date	Time	Opponent	Rank	Site	Result	Attendance
September 13		at Mississippi College	No. 5	Robinson-Hale Stadium; Clinton, MS	W 58–0	6,334
September 20	6:00 p.m.	Langston*	No. 5	Braly Municipal Stadium; Florence, AL	W 56–7	11,103
September 27	6:00 p.m.	No. 21 Valdosta State	No. 5	Braly Municipal Stadium; Florence, AL	W 31–29	10,482
October 4	6:00 p.m.	Western Oregon*	No. 5	Braly Municipal Stadium; Florence, AL	W 30–10	9,716
October 11	3:00 p.m.	at UNC Pembroke*	No. 5	Grace P. Johnson Stadium; Pembroke, NC	W 27–6	3,306
October 18	5:00 p.m.	at Florida Tech	No. 4	Pirate Stadium; Melbourne, FL	W 34–31	3,129
October 25	6:00 p.m.	West Georgia	No. 3	Braly Municipal Stadium; Florence, AL	W 31–28	8,242
November 1	6:00 p.m.	at No. 19 Delta State	No. 3	McCool Stadium; Cleveland, MS	L 28–33	5,112
November 8	3:00 p.m.	Shorter	No. 15	Braly Municipal Stadium; Florence, AL	W 45–7	9,632
November 13	6:00 p.m.	at West Alabama	No. 15	Tiger Stadium; Livingston, AL (rivalry)	W 24–16	2,304
November 22	12:00 p.m.	No. 21 Valdosta State	No. 12	Braly Municipal Stadium; Florence, AL (NCAA Division II First Round)	L 31–33	5,214
*Non-conference game; Rankings from AFCA Poll released prior to the game; All times are in Central time
