= Kevin Haslam (American football coach) =

American football coach and sports administrator

Coaching career (HC unless noted)
- 1994–1996: Nebraska Wesleyan (OC)
- 1997–1999: Wayne State (NE)
- 2000–2001: Saint Mary (KS)
- 2002–2004: Eastern Arizona

Administrative career (AD unless noted)
- 2000–2001: Saint Mary (KS)
- 2005–2007: MacMurray
- 2008–2011: Arizona State (assistant AD)
- 2021: North Alabama (interim AD)

Head coaching record
- Overall: 8–42 (college); 4–25 (junior college)

Kevin R. Haslam is an American university administrator and former college football coach. He is the vice president of advancement and the executive director of the UNA Foundation at the University of North Alabama in Florence, Alabama, a position he has held since 2019. Haslam also served as the interim athletic director at North Alabama from June to August 2021.

Haslam served as the head football coach at Wayne State College in Wayne, Nebraska from 1997 to 1999 and the University of Saint Mary in Leavenworth, Kansas from 2000 to 2001. He was also the athletic director at Saint Mary during the same time period and at MacMurray College in Jacksonville, Illinois from 2005 to 2007.

== Coaching career ==
=== Assistant coaching ===
Haslam got started in collegiate coaching as the offensive coordinator at Nebraska Wesleyan University from 1994 to 1996.

=== Wayne State College ===
Haslam's first head coaching position was at Wayne State College in Wayne, Nebraska. Haslam took over for the 1997 season and resigned after the conclusion of the 1999 season; Wayne State lost their final game, 71–30, to Northwestern Oklahoma. The Wayne State football had a record of 7–25 under his command.

=== University of Saint Mary ===
Haslam was the first head football coach for the University of Saint Mary in Leavenworth, Kansas, and he held that position for two seasons, from 2000 until he resigned 2001. The least successful football coach at the school, his record at St. Marys of 1–17 ranks him last in total wins and winning percentage. He also served as the school's athletic director during that same time period.

=== Eastern Arizona ===
Haslam resigned from Saint Mary's to become the head football coach at Eastern Arizona College in Thatcher, Arizona, a two-year college, from 2001 until the end of the 2004 season.

== Athletics administration ==
=== MacMurray ===
Haslam took over the position of athletic director at MacMurray College after the NCAA imposed the second-ever death penalty (under new criteria) on a collegiate athletic program. MacMurray's men's tennis team was banned from outside competition for two years through the 2006–07 academic year. The team also was banned from postseason competition for the 2007–08 and 2008–09 academic years.

=== Arizona State ===
In 2007, Haslam became the Assistant Athletic Director of Annual Giving at Arizona State University where he also completes several front-office activities.

== Education ==
Haslam earned a Bachelor of Arts degree from New Mexico Highlands University in Las Vegas, New Mexico and completed a Master of Science in education Wayne State College.

== Head coaching record ==
=== College ===
Year	Team	Overall	Conference	Standing	Bowl/playoffs
Wayne State Wildcats (NCAA Division II independent) (1997)
1997	Wayne State	3–7			
Wayne State Wildcats (Northern Sun Intercollegiate Conference) (1998–1999)
1998	Wayne State	1–10	0–0	NA	
1999	Wayne State	3–8	3–5	T–6th	
Wayne State:		7–25	3–5		
Saint Mary Spires (Kansas Collegiate Athletic Conference) (2000–2001)
2000	Saint Mary	0–9	0–9	10th	
2001	Saint Mary	1–8	1–8	T–9th	
Saint Mary:		1–17	1–17		
Total:		8–42			
