= Scott Frear =

American football coach

Coaching career (HC unless noted)
- 2002–2004: Saint Mary

Head coaching record
- Overall: 10–18

Accomplishments and honors

Awards
- KCAC Coach of the Year (2002)

Scott Frear is an American former football coach. He served as the head football coach at the University of Saint Mary in Leavenworth, Kansas from 2002 to 2004, compiling a record of 10–18.

== Coaching career ==
=== Assistant collegiate coaching ===
Frear worked at Avila University as an offensive coordinator and was a part of bringing the program into existence. He also spent two seasons at Lindenwood University as the defensive line coach. Frear started his coaching career in 1989 at Wayne State College where he spent four seasons as the defensive line coach.

=== Coaching overseas ===
Frear also spent eight years coaching football overseas, including six years with the Finnish national team. While in Finland, Frear helped lead the Finnish team to three European Gold Medals as the defensive assistant and special teams coordinator. During this period he served as head coach in the Vaahteraliiga for the Arctic Circle Stars in Rovaniemi, Finland. While in Finland, he encouraged Seppo Ovie Evwaraye to emigrate to the United States to play football for the University of Nebraska–Lincoln.

=== University of St. Mary ===
Frear was named the third head football coach at the University of Saint Mary in Leavenworth, Kansas and he held that position for three seasons, from 2002 until 2004. His coaching record at St. Mary's was 10–18. This ranks him second at St. Mary's in total wins and second at St. Mary's in winning percentage. Frear was named the Kansas Collegiate Athletic Conference Coach of the Year 2002.

== Resignation ==
Frear resigned on the morning of August 16, 2005 when the university was made aware that federal authorities were investigating Frear on charges of child pornography. He was later indicted by a federal grand jury on child pornography charges and eventually pleaded guilty to those charges. Of the potential five to twenty years in prison faced, he was sentenced to thirteen years.
