= 2014 NCAA Division II football rankings =

The 2014 NCAA Division II Football Rankings are from the American Football Coaches Association (AFCA). This is for the 2014 season.

== Legend ==
	Increase in ranking
	Decrease in ranking
	Not ranked previous week
(#–#)	Win–loss record
(Italics)	Number of first place votes
т	Tied with team above or below also with this symbol

== American Football Coaches Association poll ==
	Preseason	Week 1 Sept 9	Week 2 Sept 16	Week 3 Sept 23	Week 4 Sept 30	Week 5 Oct 7	Week 6 Oct 14	Week 7 Oct 21	Week 8 Oct 28	Week 9 Nov 4	Week 10 Nov 11	Week 11 Nov 18	Week 12 Postseason	
1.	Northwest Missouri State (31)	Northwest Missouri State (1–0) (32)	Northwest Missouri State (2–0) (25)	Northwest Missouri State (3–0) (29)	Northwest Missouri State (4–0) (30)	Northwest Missouri State (5–0) (30)	Northwest Missouri State (6–0) (31)	Minnesota State (7–0) (24)	Minnesota State (8–0) (26)	Minnesota State (9–0) (28)	Minnesota State (10–0) (29)	Minnesota State (11–0) (29)	CSU Pueblo (14–1)	1.
2.	Grand Valley State	CSU Pueblo (1–0)	CSU Pueblo (2–0) (6)	CSU Pueblo (3–0) (2)	CSU Pueblo (4–0) (1)	CSU Pueblo (5–0) (1)	Minnesota State (6–0)	Minnesota–Duluth (7–0) (4)	Minnesota–Duluth (8–0) (2)	Minnesota–Duluth (9–0) (1)	Minnesota–Duluth (10–0)	Minnesota–Duluth (11–0)	Minnesota State (14–1)	2.
3.	Minnesota–Duluth	Minnesota–Duluth (1–0)	Minnesota State (2–0)	Minnesota State (3–0)	Minnesota State (4–0)	Minnesota State (5–0)	Minnesota–Duluth (6–0)	North Alabama (6–0) (2)	North Alabama (7–0) (2)	Lenoir–Rhyne (9–0) (2)	Lenoir–Rhyne (10–0) (1)	Lenoir–Rhyne (11–0) (1)	Minnesota–Duluth (13–1)	3.
4.	CSU Pueblo	Minnesota State (1–0)	Minnesota–Duluth (2–0)	Minnesota–Duluth (3–0)	Minnesota–Duluth (4–0)	Minnesota–Duluth (5–0)	North Alabama (5–0)	Henderson State (7–0)	Lenoir–Rhyne (8–0)	Ferris State (9–0)	Ferris State (10–0) (1)	Ferris State (11–0) (1)	Ohio Dominican (11–2)	4.
5.	North Alabama	North Alabama (0–0)	North Alabama (1–0)	North Alabama (2–0)	North Alabama (3–0)	North Alabama (4–0)	Lenoir–Rhyne (6–0)	Lenoir–Rhyne (7–0)	Ferris State (8–0) (1)	Bloomsburg (9–0)	Bloomsburg (10–0)	Pittsburg State (10–1)	Concord (13–1)	5.
6.	Lenoir–Rhyne	Lenoir–Rhyne (1–0)	Lenoir–Rhyne (2–0)	Lenoir–Rhyne (3–0)	Lenoir–Rhyne (4–0)	Lenoir–Rhyne (5–0)	Henderson State (6–0)	Ferris State (7–0) (1)	Bloomsburg (8–0)	Pittsburg State (8–1)	Pittsburg State (9–1)	Northwest Missouri State (10–1)	West Georgia (12–3)	6.
7.	Minnesota State	Henderson State (1–0)	Henderson State (2–0)	Henderson State (3–0)	Henderson State (4–0)	Henderson State (5–0)	Ohio Dominican (6–0)	West Chester (7–0)	Pittsburg State (7–1)	Northwest Missouri State (8–1)	Northwest Missouri State (9–1)	Ouachita Baptist (10–0)	Pittsburg State (11–2)	7.
8.	Henderson State (1)	Pittsburg State (1–0)	Pittsburg State (2–0)	Pittsburg State (3–0)	Ohio Dominican (4–0)	Ohio Dominican (5–0)	Shepherd (6–0)	Bloomsburg (7–0)	Northwest Missouri State (7–1)	CSU Pueblo (8–1)	CSU Pueblo (9–1)	CSU Pueblo (10–1)	Lenoir–Rhyne (11–1)	8.
9.	Pittsburg State	West Chester (1–0)	Ohio Dominican (2–0)	Ohio Dominican (3–0)	West Chester (4–0)	Shepherd (5–0)	Delta State (5–0)	Pittsburg State (6–1)	CSU Pueblo (7–1)	Ouachita Baptist (8–0)	Ouachita Baptist (9–0)	Ohio Dominican (9–1)	Ouachita Baptist (10–1)	9.
10.	West Chester	Ohio Dominican (1–0)	West Chester (2–0)	West Chester (3–0)	Shepherd (4–0)	West Chester (5–0)	West Chester (6–0)	Northwest Missouri State (6–1)	Sioux Falls (8–0)	Winston–Salem State (8–1)	Winston–Salem State (9–1)	Concord (11–0)	Valdosta State (10–3)	10.
11.	West Texas A&M	Shepherd (1–0)	Shepherd (2–0)	Shepherd (3–0)	Delta State (3–0)	Delta State (4–0)	Ferris State (6–0)	Colorado Mines (7–0)	Winston–Salem State (7–1)	Ohio Dominican (7–1)	Ohio Dominican (8–1)	Delta State (9–1)	Ferris State (11–1)	11.
12.	Shepherd	Winston–Salem State (1–0)	Tarleton State (1–0)	Delta State (2–0)	Bloomsburg (4–0)	Bloomsburg (5–0)	Bloomsburg (6–0)	CSU Pueblo (6–1)	Ohio Dominican (6–1)	Delta State (7–1)	Concord (10–0)	North Alabama (9–1)	Bloomsburg (11–2)	12.
13.	Ohio Dominican	Carson–Newman (1–0)	Valdosta State (2–0)	Bloomsburg (3–0)	Ferris State (4–0)	Ferris State (5–0)	Harding (5–0)	Michigan Tech (6–0)	Ouachita Baptist (7–0)	Concord (9–0)	Delta State (8–1)	Harding (9–1)	Delta State (9–2)	13.
14.	Winston–Salem State	Azusa Pacific (1–0)	Delta State (1–0)	Ferris State (3–0)	Winston–Salem State (3–1)	Harding (4–0)	CSU Pueblo (5–1)	Sioux Falls (7–0)	Henderson State (7–1)	Henderson State (8–1)	Henderson State (9–1)	Bloomsburg (10–1)	Northwest Missouri State (10–2)	14.
15.	St. Cloud State	Indianapolis (1–0)	Bloomsburg (2–0)	Winston–Salem State (2–1)	Harding (3–0)	Winston–Salem State (4–1)	Colorado Mines (6–0)	Winston–Salem State (6–1)	Concord (8–0)	North Alabama (7–1)	North Alabama (8–1)	West Chester (10–1)	West Chester (11–2)	15.
16.	Carson–Newman	Tarleton State (0–0)	Ferris State (2–0)	Harding (2–0)	Midwestern State (3–0)	Colorado Mines (5–0)	Winston–Salem State (5–1)	Ohio Dominican (6–1)	Carson–Newman (6–1)	Harding (7–1)	Harding (8–1)	Sioux Falls (10–1)	North Alabama (9–2)	16.
17.	Tarleton State	Delta State (1–0)	West Alabama (2–0)	Colorado Mines (3–0)	Colorado Mines (4–0)	Carson–Newman (4–1)	Pittsburg State (5–1)	Carson–Newman (5–1)	Harding (6–1)	Sioux Falls (8–1)	West Chester (9–1)	Colorado Mines (10–1)	Harding (9–2)	17.
18.	Indianapolis	Grand Valley State (0–1)	Winston–Salem State (1–1)	Midwestern State (2–0)	Carson–Newman (3–1)	Pittsburg State (4–1)	Carson–Newman (4–1)	Ouachita Baptist (6–0)	Colorado Mines (7–1)	West Chester (8–1)	Sioux Falls (9–1)	Michigan Tech (9–1)	Sioux Falls (11–1)	18.
19.	Delta State	Emporia State (1–0)	St. Cloud State (1–1)	Carson–Newman (2–1)	Pittsburg State (3–1)	Slippery Rock (5–0)	Sioux Falls (6–0)	Concord (7–0)	Delta State (6–1)	Colorado Mines (8–1)	Colorado Mines (9–1)	Azusa Pacific (10–1)	Colorado Mines (10–2)	19.
20.	IUP (Note: In the actual printed polls, IUP was listed as Indiana (PA))	IUP (1–0)	Harding (2–0)	Winona State (3–0)	Slippery Rock (4–0)	Sioux Falls (5–0)	Michigan Tech (5–0)	Delta State (5–1)	West Chester (7–1)	Michigan Tech (7–1)	Michigan Tech (8–1)	Winston–Salem State (9–2)	Angelo State (9–3)	20.
21.	UNC Pembroke	Bloomsburg (1–0)	Carson–Newman (1–1)	Valdosta State (2–1)	Sioux Falls (4–0)	West Georgia (5–0)	Concord (6–0)	Shepherd (6–1)	Michigan Tech (6–1)	Shepherd (7–1)	Shepherd (8–1)	Valdosta State (8–2)	Michigan Tech (9–2)	21.
22.	Azusa Pacific т	West Texas A&M (0–1)	Colorado Mines (2–0)	Slippery Rock (3–0)	West Alabama (3–1)	Michigan Tech (4–0)	Ouachita Baptist (5–0)	Texas A&M–Commerce (6–1)	Shepherd (6–1)	Ashland (8–1)	Azusa Pacific (9–1)	Henderson State (9–2)	Virginia State (10–3)	22.
23.	Emporia State т	Valdosta State (1–0)	Midwestern State (1–0)	West Alabama (2–1)	Michigan Tech (4–0)	Concord (5–0)	Texas A&M–Commerce (5–1)	Harding (5–1)	Ashland (7–1)	Azusa Pacific (8–1)	Indianapolis (9–1)	Angelo State (8–2) т	Azusa Pacific (10–1)	23.
24.	Bloomsburg	Ferris State (1–0)	Winona State (2–0)	Sioux Falls (3–0)	West Georgia (4–0)	Humboldt State (5–0)	Ashland (5–1)	Ashland (6–1)	Azusa Pacific (7–1)	Carson–Newman (6–2)	Texas A&M–Commerce (8–1)	Virginia State (9–2) т	Winston–Salem State (9–2)	24.
25.	Tuskegee	St. Cloud State (0–1) т	Slippery Rock (2–0)	Findlay (3–0)	Winona State (3–1)	Midwestern State (3–1)	Azusa Pacific (5–1)	Azusa Pacific (6–1)	California (PA) (7–1)	Indianapolis (8–1)	Valdosta State (7–2)	West Georgia (9–2)	Henderson State (9–2)	25.
26.		West Alabama (1–0) т												26.
	Preseason	Week 1 Sept 9	Week 2 Sept 16	Week 3 Sept 23	Week 4 Sept 30	Week 5 Oct 7	Week 6 Oct 14	Week 7 Oct 21	Week 8 Oct 28	Week 9 Nov 4	Week 10 Nov 11	Week 11 Nov 18	Week 12 Postseason	
		Dropped: 21 UNC Pembroke; 25 Tuskegee	Dropped: 14 Azusa Pacific; 15 Indianapolis; 18 Grand Valley State; 19 Emporia State; 20 IUP; 22 West Texas A&M	Dropped: 12 Tarleton State; 19 St. Cloud State	Dropped: 21 Valdosta State; 25 Findlay	Dropped: 22 West Alabama; 25 Winona State	Dropped: 19 Slippery Rock; 21 West Georgia; 24 Humboldt State; 25 Midwestern State	None	Dropped: 22 Texas A&M–Commerce	Dropped: 25 California (PA)	Dropped: 22 Ashland; 24 Carson–Newman	Dropped: 21 Shepherd; 23 Indianapolis; 24 Texas A&M–Commerce	None	
