= Saint Mary Spires =

- University: University of Saint Mary
- Nickname: Spires
- NAIA: Region IV
- Conference: Kansas Collegiate Athletic Conference
- Athletic director: Rob Miller
- Location: Leavenworth, Kansas
- Varsity teams: 24
- Football stadium: Charles J. Berkel Memorial Stadium
- Basketball arena: Ryan Sports Center
- Baseball stadium: Kehoe Memorial Baseball Field
- Colors: Navy and gold
- Mascot: Spiro
- Website: www.gospires.com

The Saint Mary Spires are the athletic teams that represent the University of Saint Mary, located in Leavenworth, Kansas, in intercollegiate sports as a member of the National Association of Intercollegiate Athletics (NAIA), primarily competing in the Kansas Collegiate Athletic Conference (KCAC) since the 1999–2000 academic year. The Spires previously competed in the defunct Midlands Collegiate Athletic Conference (MCAC) from 1994–95 to 1998–99. Their team colors are navy and gold.

== Varsity teams ==
USM competes in 24 intercollegiate varsity sports:

Men's sports	Women's sports
Baseball	Basketball
Basketball	Bowling
Bowling	Cross country
Cross country	Flag football
Football	Soccer
Soccer	Softball
Swimming	Swimming
Tennis	Tennis
Track and field	Track and field
Wrestling	Volleyball
	Wrestling
Co-ed sports
Esports
^{1} – includes both indoor and outdoor

=== Football ===
Saint Mary began its football program in 2000 under Kevin Haslam and the current coach is Lance Hinson. As of conclusion of the 2014 season, the school has an all-time record of 34 wins, 68 losses, and 0 ties.

In 2016, The Spire football team won a school record 8 games, capping off the season by beating the #10 Kansas Wesleyan Coyotes.

Seasons	Coach	Record	Notes
Sivertson	1998–1999	3–3	Inaugural coach
Kevin Haslam	2000–2001	1–17	First coach for a varsity season
Scott Frear	2002–2004	10–18	2002 KCAC Coach of the Year
Lance Hinson	2005–2014	38–54	2005 KCAC Coach of the Year
Jay Osborne	2014–2019	23–42	2016 KCAC Coach of the Year
Lance Hinson	2019–present	3–11	

=== Softball ===
In 2001 St.Mary's softball team won the KCAC tournament in their first season in the league.

=== Cross country / track and field ===
The University of Saint Mary cross country and track and field teams have won 21 KCAC Conference Championships since the inception of the program in 2011-2012. The Spires have an active streak going while winning nine straight KCAC Men's Cross Country Championships from 2013-2021. The Spires are led by Head Cross Country and Track and Field Coach Alstin Benton.

The Spires won the 2020-21 USTFCCCA NAIA Men's Program of the Year Award. The Spires where the only team in the NAIA to finish Top 10 in the Nation in Cross Country, Indoor Track, and Outdoor Track

National Championship Appearances	Team Finish	Head coach
2013 Men's Cross Country	21st	David Dominguez
2014 Men's Cross Country	14th	Alstin Benton
2015 Men's Cross Country	National Runner-Up	Alstin Benton
2016 Men's Cross Country	14th	Alstin Benton
2017 Men's Cross Country	5th	Alstin Benton
2018 Men's Cross Country	6th	Alstin Benton
2019 Men's Cross Country	5th	Alstin Benton
2020 Men's Cross Country	5th	Alstin Benton
2021 Men's Cross Country	National Runner-Up	Alstin Benton
2014 Women's Cross Country	31st	Alstin Benton
2017 Women's Cross Country	32nd	Alstin Benton
2018 Women's Cross Country	24th	Alstin Benton
2020 Women's Cross Country	10th	Alstin Benton
2021 Women's Cross Country	7th	Alstin Benton

== Facilities ==
Saint Mary's sports facilities include:

Venue	Sport(s)	Capac.
Charles J. Berkel Memorial Stadium	Football (Note: Includes flag football.); Soccer; Lacrosse; Track and Field	1,000
Ryan Sport Center	Volleyball; Basketball; Wrestling	1,500
McGilley Fieldhouse	(various indoor) (Note: Arena for practise and recreational purposes.)	2,000
Baseball/Softball Complex	Baseball; Softball	n/i
Spire Cross Country Course	Cross Country	–
Wrestling Complex	Wrestiling	n/i

== Current head coaches ==
Sport	Coach
Baseball	Bruce Peddie
Basketball (men's)	Troy Brown
Basketball (women's)	Andy Kelley
Bowling (men's / women's)	Christopher Beall
Cross Country (men's / women's)	Alstin Benton
Esports	Cray Pennison
Football	Lance Hinson
Flag Football	Angellica Grayson
Lacrosse (men's)	John Dial
Lacrosse (women's)	Kallie Much
Soccer (men's)	Derek Mazeitis
Soccer (women's)	Justin Seever
Softball	Hayley Siebman
Swimming (men's / women's)	David Bresser
Track and Field (men's / women's)	Alstin Benton
Volleyball	Amy Beall
Wrestling (men's / women's)	Chuck Kearney

== Conference championships ==
Sport	Titles	Winning years
Baseball	1	2005 (Tournament Champion)
Basketball (men's)	1	2013
Cross country (men's)	9	2013, 2014, 2015, 2016, 2017, 2018, 2019, 2020, 2021
Cross country (women's)	5	2014, 2017, 2018, 2020, 2021
Soccer (men's)	1	2001
Soccer (women's)	1	2001
Softball	1	2001
Track and field (indoor) (men's)	3	2018, 2019, 2020
Track and Field (men's)	3	2019, 2020, 2021
Track and Field (women's)	1	2021
Wrestling (men's)	1	2019
Volleyball (women's)	1	2019
