= University of Saint Mary =

Private university in Leavenworth, Kansas, US

Coordinates: 39°16′37″N 94°54′24″W

- Former name: Saint Mary College (1923–2003)
- Motto: Virtus Et Scientia
- Motto in English: Virtue and Science
- Type: Private university
- Established: 1923; 103 years ago
- Religious affiliation: Catholic (Sisters of Charity of Leavenworth)
- President: Dr. Ann Marie Fallon
- Provost: Michelle Metzinger
- Students: 1,460
- Undergraduates: 1,025
- Postgraduates: 435
- Location: Leavenworth, Kansas, United States
- Colors: Navy blue and gold
- Nickname: Spires
- Sporting affiliations: NAIA – KCAC
- Mascot: Spiro the Dragon
- Website: stmary.edu

The University of Saint Mary (USM) is a private Catholic university in Leavenworth, Kansas, United States. It is sponsored by the Sisters of Charity of Leavenworth, who established it in 1923 as Saint Mary College. Though it was originally a school for women, the school is now coeducational. The mother house of the order is also on the premises. The university offers 26 bachelor's degree programs and six master's degree programs.

== History ==
The Sisters of Charity of Saint Vincent de Paul came to Leavenworth, Kansas, in 1858 and began teaching boys and girls. One year later, they created St. Mary's Institute, a small educational institute for women, in downtown Leavenworth. In 1870, Saint Mary's was moved to its current location south of the city and was renamed St. Mary's Academy. In 1923, the sisters established Saint Mary College. In 1932, the college became a four-year institute and started accepting a few men in certain areas of study. Arthur Morton Murphy who was born in Electric Peak, Montana and earned his doctorate at the Catholic University of America in Washington, DC, was chosen as the school's first president, and served in that capacity for 25 years. He was the first layman to preside over a Catholic college for women in the United States. Murphy was succeeded as president by poet and educator Mary Janet McGilley. In 1974, Saint Mary College became the first four-year institution to offer a degree completion in Kansas City. The school became residentially coeducational in 1988. In 2000, a campus was opened in Overland Park, Kansas. The institution expanded again in July 2003, changing its name to the University of Saint Mary. The school's first fully endowed chair was inaugurated in 1989, honoring the retirement of Sister Mary Janet.

== Campuses ==
The main campus of USM is located between 200 acres (0.81 km^{2}) of hills in Leavenworth, Kansas, and is the location of undergraduate classrooms, three residential halls (Berkel Hall, Maria Hall & Steele Hall), and the main academic and administrative offices. It is near a nature preserve and has stately academic buildings, indoor athletic facilities, and outdoor playing fields.

The Overland Park Campus is in Overland Park, Kansas, on College Boulevard, near Roe Avenue and off of I435. This campus hosts evening master's degree classes and degree-completion programs. Its main function is accelerated degree completion and graduate programs and it is home to various resource centers.

The Wyandotte County Campus is located inside Providence Medical Center. It hosts master's degree classrooms and degree completion programs year round.

Saint Mary offers Masters in Art education at Sacred Heart in Shawnee, Kansas, and has an online degree program given in eight-week sessions. Some of the buildings on these campuses are Annunciation Chapel, Saint Mary Hall, Xavier Courtyard, DePaul Library, McGilley Fieldhouse, Kehoe Memorial Baseball Field, Charles J. Berkel Memorial Stadium and the Ryan Sports Center.

The University of Saint Mary began its Prison Education Program in 2021 at the Lansing Correctional Facility. Since then, it has expanded into the US Military Disciplinary Barracks and Joint Regional Correctional Facility, both on Fort Leavenworth, as well as the Federal Correctional Institution-Leavenworth. Today, the program provides associate's and bachelor's degrees in business administration management to more than 100 students across all locations.

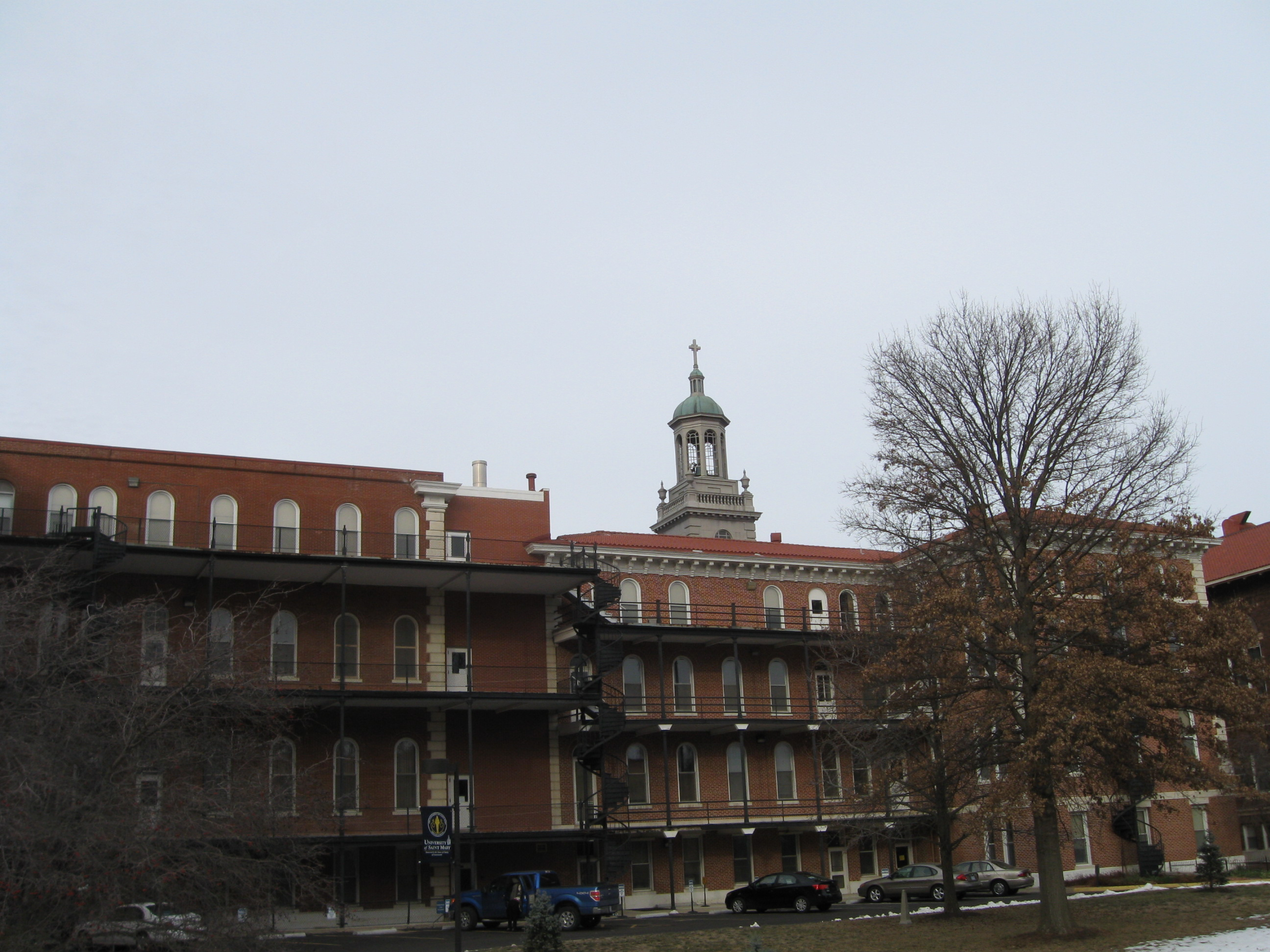
Main building

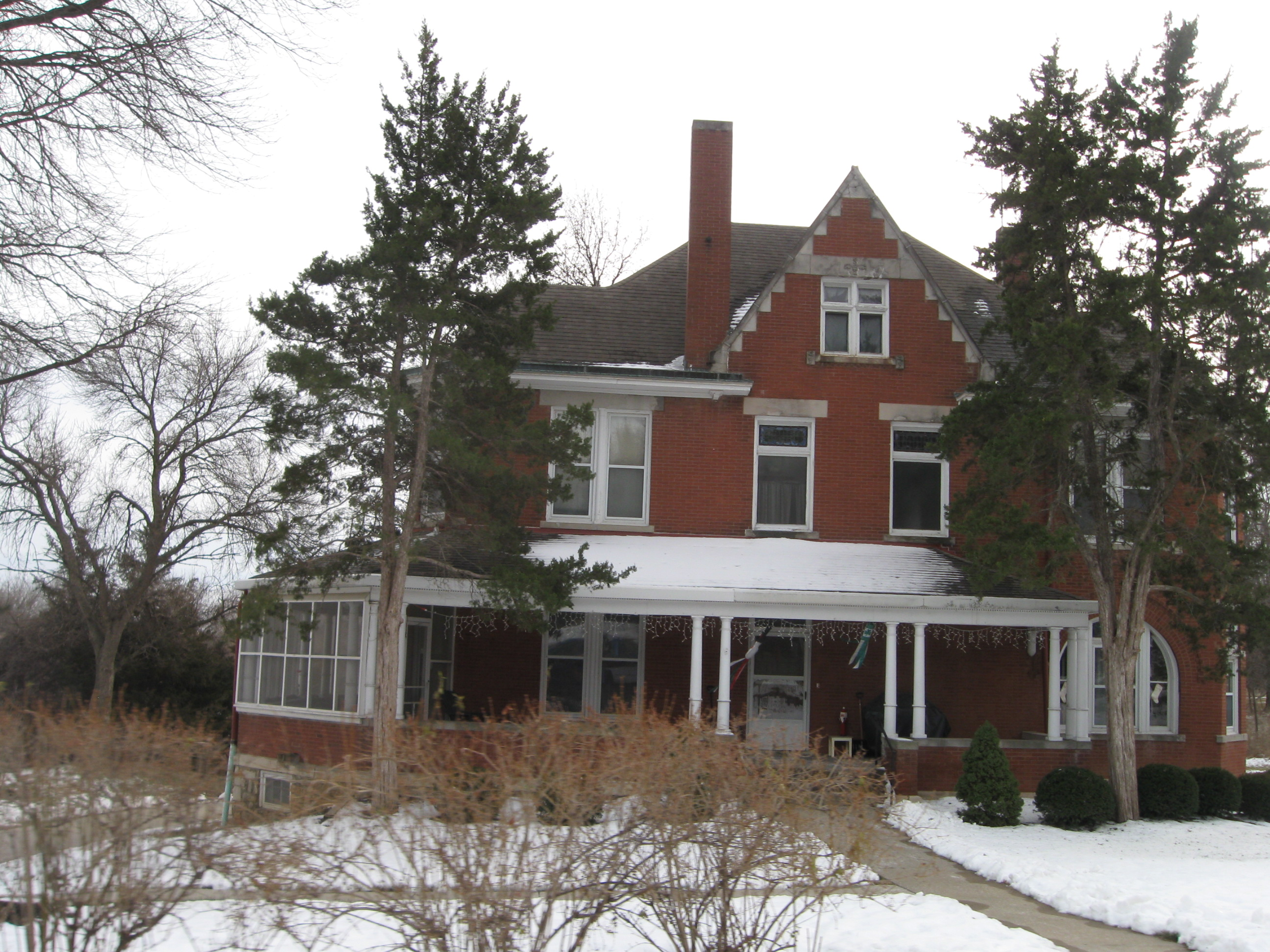
House

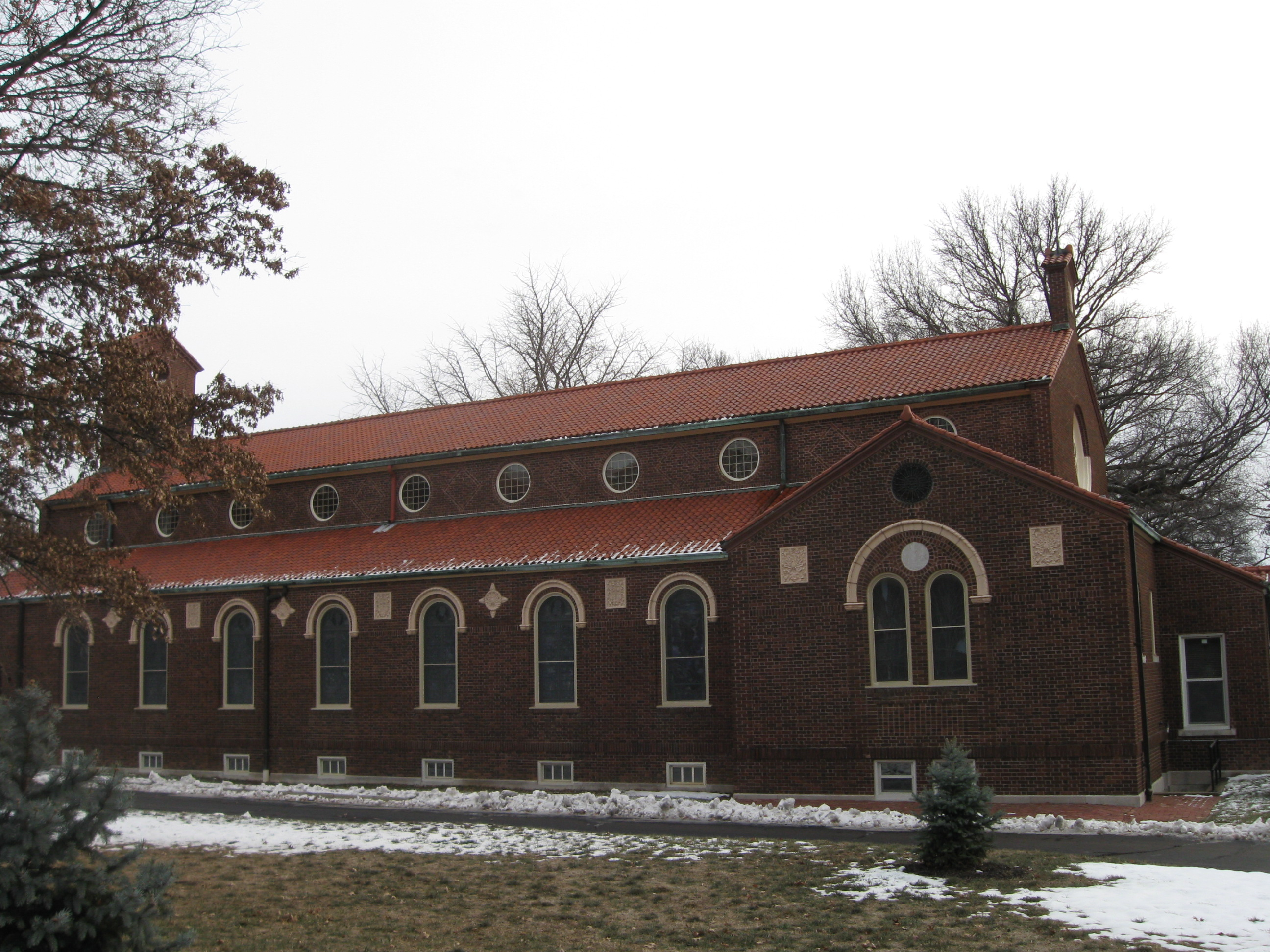
Annunciation Chapel

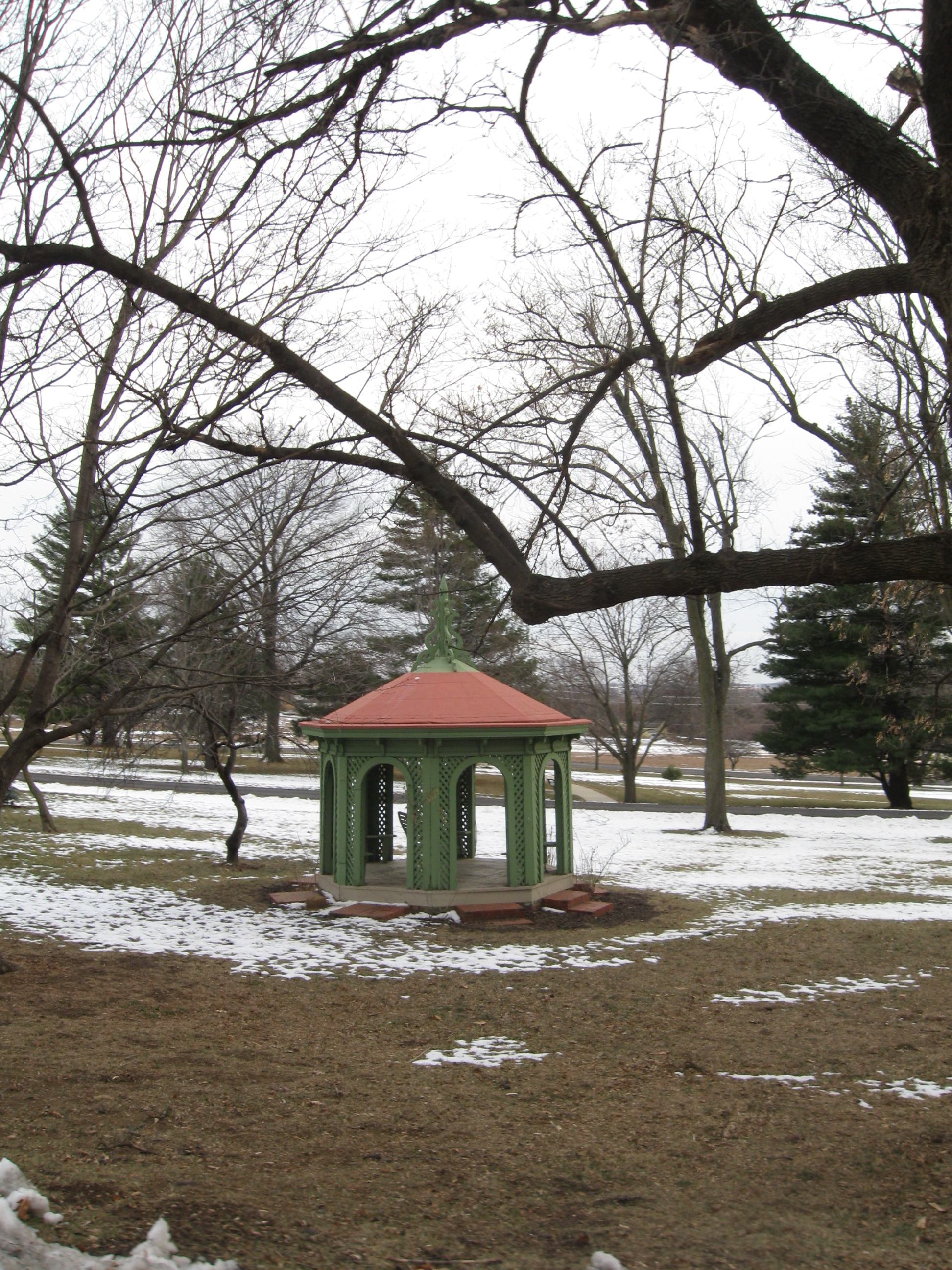
Gazebo

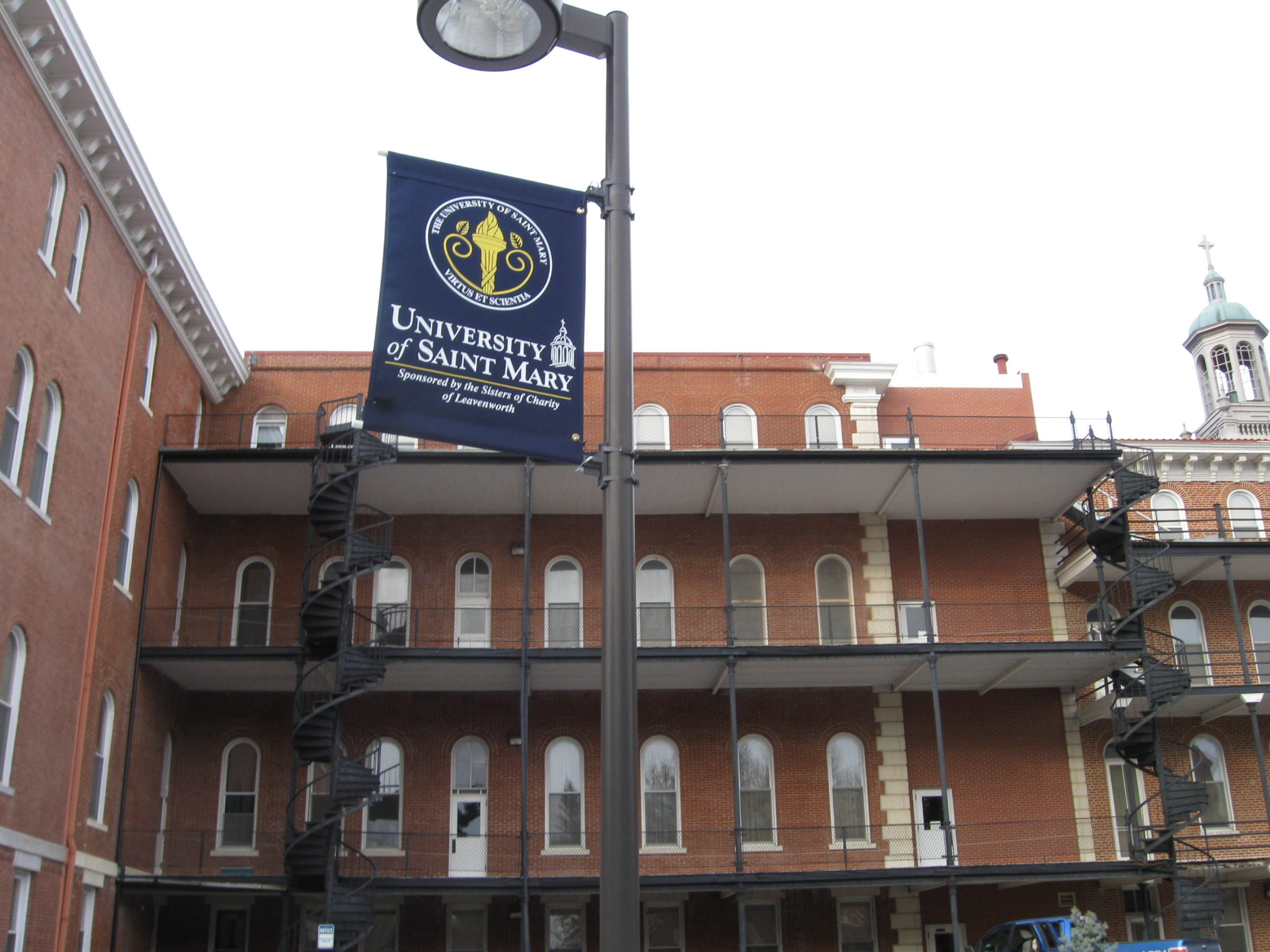
Banner

== Organization and administration ==
The university is sponsored by the Sisters of Charity of Leavenworth.

== Academics ==
Saint Mary has around 1,200 students enrolled across two campuses. It has a full-time faculty of 31, who teach 26 undergraduate programs and six masters programs. Students at St. Mary come from 33 different states, and it has international students from Brazil, Trinidad and Tobago, Taiwan, the United Kingdom, Colombia, Finland and Canada. The average age of residential full-time students is 22 and the average full-time undergraduate is 27. The student body is 47% male and 53% female. On average, USM receives 427 applications per year, and 233 students are accepted.

== Athletics ==
Saint Mary athletics logo

The Saint Mary (USM) athletic teams are called the Spires. The university is a member of the National Association of Intercollegiate Athletics (NAIA), primarily competing in the Kansas Collegiate Athletic Conference (KCAC) since the 1999–2000 academic year. The Spires previously competed in the defunct Midlands Collegiate Athletic Conference (MCAC) from 1994–95 to 1998–99. Their team colors are navy and gold.

USM competes in 26 intercollegiate varsity sports. Men's sports include baseball, basketball, bowling, cross country, football, lacrosse, soccer, swimming, tennis, track & field and wrestling; women's sports include basketball, bowling, cross country, flag football, lacrosse, soccer, softball, swimming, tennis, track & field, volleyball and wrestling; and co-ed sports include cheerleading, dance and eSports.

== Notable people ==
=== Faculty ===
- Scott Frear, college football coach
- Lance Hinson, college football coach
