= C.H.A.M.P.S. Heart of Texas Bowl =

- Location: (on hiatus)
- Previous stadiums: Bulldawg Stadium (2001–2017), Waco ISD Stadium (2018), Memorial Stadium (2021–2024)
- Previous locations: Copperas Cove, Texas (2001–2017), Waco, Texas (2018), Commerce, Texas (2021–2024)
- Operated: 2001–present
- Conference tie-ins: LSC (2012–2018); NCAA D-II (2012–2018); NJCAA (2001–present)

The C.H.A.M.P.S. Heart of Texas Bowl (known as the HOT Bowl for short) is the name of an American football bowl game played at three locations in Central Texas since 2001, featuring teams from the National Junior College Athletic Association (NJCAA). Between 2012 and 2018, it was played as a doubleheader with an NCAA Division II postseason game, which was also known as the C.H.A.M.P.S. Heart of Texas Bowl.

The acronym "C.H.A.M.P.S." stands for "Communities Helping Americans Mature, Progress and Succeed," which is a nonprofit group focusing on treating drug and alcohol abuse, bullying, mental health, and preventing teen suicide. After the addition of another title sponsor, TIPS (The Interlocal Purchasing System), the games were billed as the TIPS–CHAMPS Heart of Texas Bowl in 2018.

The bowl games were founded by Copperas Cove High School football coach and athletic director Jack Welch and played in Copperas Cove until 2017. Following Welch's retirement from the district, the games moved to Waco ISD Stadium in Waco for 2018. The Division II game was then discontinued, but after a two-year hiatus, the junior college game resumed in 2021 in a new location, at Memorial Stadium in Commerce, Texas, where Welch had become a member of the football staff of East Texas A&M. Welch left that position after the 2024 season, putting the fate of the bowl in doubt once again.

Following his appointment as president of Fort Scott Community College in Kansas prior to the 2025–26 academic year, Welch persuaded the Fort Scott city commission to help fund the C.H.A.M.P.S. bowl there. In September 2025, shortly after the deal was made public, city manager Brad Matkin announced that the game would not be played in 2025, but that he and Welch would work together to "to get proper sponsorship for the game so it can possibly be played in Fort Scott in December 2026."

== The JUCO bowl ==
The first and older of the two C.H.A.M.P.S. Heart of Texas Bowls, which has been played since 2001, features two NJCAA teams, one from Texas and one from out-of-state. The Southwest Junior College Football Conference provides the game's Texas team. Opponents have come from Arizona, Georgia, Kansas, Minnesota, Mississippi, and New Mexico. Of the twenty-two junior college games contested through 2024, Texas teams have won fifteen.

Navarro College has had the most appearances among the Texas teams, with six. Trinity Valley Community College of Texas has been the most successful participant by far, going 5–0 in its games. Among the out-of-state teams, Coffeyville Community College of Kansas has the most appearances, with four. No out-of-state team has won the bowl more than once.

== The Division II bowl (defunct) ==
During its brief existence, the Division II version of the C.H.A.M.P.S. Heart of Texas Bowl was one of four Division II sanctioned bowl games (the other three being the Mineral Water Bowl, the Heritage Bowl, and the Live United Texarkana Bowl). The bowl had a tie-in with the Lone Star Conference (LSC), which provided a representative from among the LSC teams not qualifying for the NCAA Division II Football Championship playoffs. The other participant was chosen at-large, with teams from the Great American Conference (GAC) providing the opposition three times, the Mid-America Intercollegiate Athletics Association (MIAA) three times.

In 2013 harsh winter weather prompted the cancellation of the Division II bowl (though not the junior college bowl), resulting in the Division II game being contested six times over its seven-year lifespan. Six different teams won the game; the only repeat participants, Angelo State and Eastern New Mexico, each lost both of the games they appeared in.

The LSC representative in the 2012 game, McMurry, was an independent at the time, in its first year of transitioning from NCAA Division III to Division II and LSC membership, and received the bowl bid based on its 7–3 regular-season record (1–1 vs. LSC teams). The cancelled 2013 game would have featured Tarleton State from the LSC and Ouachita Baptist from the GAC. The final Division II game, in 2018, featured the renewal of an old LSC rivalry between Angelo State and Central Oklahoma (which had moved to the MIAA in 2012). Central Oklahoma made a dramatic 21-point comeback in the second half to win the game, 41–34.

== All-time results ==
=== NJCAA bowl contests ===
Year	Winning team		Losing team	
2001	Coffeyville	49	Navarro	14
2002	Trinity Valley	33	Jones County	22
2003	Tyler	55	Rochester C&T	3
2004	Hutchinson	15	Tyler	10
2005	Cisco	47	Dodge City	28
2006	Kilgore	19	Fort Scott	7
2007	Mississippi Gulf Coast	62	Kilgore	28
2008	Fort Scott	30	Blinn	14
2009	Navarro	37	Mississippi Gulf Coast	26
2010	Blinn	31	Arizona Western	27
2011	Navarro	40	New Mexico Military	24
2012	Navarro	30	Georgia Military	23
2013	Trinity Valley	72	Mesa (AZ)	23
2014	Trinity Valley	27	Coffeyville	24
2015	East Central (MS)	35	Kilgore	21
2016	Trinity Valley	34	Northwest Mississippi	24
2017	Trinity Valley	48	Garden City	41
2018	Kilgore	28	Pima (AZ)	0
2021	Tyler	28	Coffeyville	7
2022	Butler (KS)	28	Kilgore	24
2023	Copiah–Lincoln	28	Navarro	20
2024	Navarro	31	Coffeyville	0
2025	Canceled			

=== NCAA Division II contests ===
Date	Winning team		Losing team		Notes
December 13, 2012	McMurry (Ind)	36	Southern Arkansas (GAC)	35	
December 7, 2013	Canceled				
December 6, 2014	Texas A&M–Commerce (LSC)	72	East Central (GAC)	21	
December 5, 2015	Arkansas Tech (GAC)	51	Eastern New Mexico (LSC)	35	
December 3, 2016	Fort Hays State (MIAA)	45	Eastern New Mexico (LSC)	12	
December 1, 2017	Washburn (MIAA)	41	Angelo State (LSC)	25	
December 1, 2018	Central Oklahoma (MIAA)	41	Angelo State (LSC)	34	
