= List of Central Oklahoma Bronchos football seasons =

The Central Oklahoma Bronchos college football team competes in the National Collegiate Athletic Association (NCAA) Division II, representing the University of Central Oklahoma in the Mid-America Intercollegiate Athletics Association. The Bronchos have played their home games at Wantland Stadium in Edmond, Oklahoma since 1965.

The Bronchos claim two national championships. They have also recorded 28 total conference championships, and three undefeated, untied seasons. The Central Oklahoma football program is one of the most successful programs in history, with 664 wins, which is fourth All-time among Division II programs.

The Bronchos have played in the first Oklahoma Intercollegiate Conference, the Oklahoma Collegiate Athletic Conference, the second Oklahoma Intercollegiate Conference, at the NAIA level. Since joining NCAA Division II in 1988 the Bronchos have played as members of the Lone Star Conference, and the Mid-America Intercollegiate Athletics Association.

| National champions † | Conference champions * | Shared standing T |

| Season | Head coach | Conference | Season results | | | | | | | | Postseason | Final ranking | |
| Season | Head coach | Conference | Overall | | | Conference | | | | | Post Season Result | AFCA Poll | D2fb.com Poll |
| Season | Head coach | Conference | Wins | Losses | Ties | Wins | Losses | Ties | Conference finish | Division finish (Note: The Lone Star Conference introduced divisional play for the first year in 1997; the divisional standings were based on division opponents, overall record determined the conference champion. Divisional play ceased in 2011, when the conference dropped to 8 teams.) | Post Season Result | AFCA Poll | D2fb.com Poll |
|---|---|---|---|---|---|---|---|---|---|---|---|---|---|
Central Oklahoma Bronchos
| 1902 | No Coach | Independent | 0 | 1 | 0 | — | — | — | — | — | — | — | — |
| 1903 | No team | | | | | | | | | | | | |
| 1904 | Boyd Hill | Independent | 2 | 3 | 0 | — | — | — | — | — | — | — | — |
| 1905 | Fenis Bently | Independent | 4 | 3 | 1 | — | — | — | — | — | — | — | — |
| 1906 | Fenis Bently | Independent | 6 | 3 | 0 | — | — | — | — | — | — | — | — |
| 1907 | Fenis Bently | Independent | 2 | 2 | 1 | — | — | — | — | — | — | — | — |
| 1908 | Fenis Bently | Independent | 4 | 4 | 2 | — | — | — | — | — | — | — | — |
| 1909 | Fenis Bently | Independent | 2 | 9 | 0 | — | — | — | — | — | — | — | — |
| 1910 | Fenis Bently | Independent | 0 | 8 | 0 | — | — | — | — | — | — | — | — |
| 1911 | Fenis Bently | Independent | 1 | 1 | 0 | — | — | — | — | — | — | — | — |
| 1912 | Charles Wantland | Independent | 4 | 3 | 0 | — | — | — | — | — | — | — | — |
| 1913 | Charles Wantland | Independent | 3 | 3 | 3 | — | — | — | — | — | — | — | — |
| 1914 * | Charles Wantland | OIC | 5 | 1 | 0 | — | — | — | 1st | — | — | — | — |
| 1915 * | Charles Wantland | OIC | 9 | 0 | 0 | — | 0 | 0 | 1st | — | — | — | — |
| 1916 | Charles Wantland | OIC | 8 | 3 | 0 | — | — | 0 | — | — | — | — | — |
| 1917 | Charles Wantland | OIC | 3 | 4 | 0 | — | — | 0 | — | — | — | — | — |
| 1918 | Charles Wantland | OIC | 6 | 2 | 0 | — | — | 0 | — | — | — | — | — |
| 1919 | Charles Wantland | OIC | 6 | 5 | 0 | — | — | 0 | — | — | — | — | — |
| 1920 | Ralph Myers | OIC | 4 | 3 | 1 | — | — | — | — | — | — | — | — |
| 1921 * | Charles Wantland | OIC | 8 | 1 | 0 | — | — | 0 | 1st | — | — | — | — |
| 1922 | Charles Wantland | OIC | 7 | 4 | 0 | — | — | 0 | — | — | — | — | — |
| 1923 * | Charles Wantland | OIC | 7 | 1 | 1 | — | — | — | 1st | — | — | — | — |
| 1924 * | Charles Wantland | OIC | 9 | 1 | 0 | — | — | 0 | 1st | — | — | — | — |
| 1925 | Charles Wantland | OIC | 3 | 4 | 2 | — | — | — | — | — | — | — | — |
| 1926 | Charles Wantland | OIC | 3 | 3 | 3 | — | — | — | — | — | — | — | — |
| 1927 | Charles Wantland | OIC | 3 | 1 | 4 | — | — | — | — | — | — | — | — |
| 1928 | Charles Wantland | OCAC | 5 | 3 | 1 | — | — | — | — | — | — | — | — |
| 1929 * | Charles Wantland | OCAC | 6 | 1 | 2 | — | — | — | 1st | — | — | — | — |
| 1930 | Charles Wantland | OCAC | 6 | 3 | 0 | — | — | 0 | — | — | — | — | — |
| 1931 * | Claude Reeds | OCAC | 6 | 2 | 1 | 4 | 0 | 1 | 1st | — | — | — | — |
| 1932 * | Claude Reeds | OCAC | 6 | 3 | 1 | 5 | 0 | 0 | T–1st | — | — | — | — |
| 1933 | Claude Reeds | OCAC | 4 | 5 | 1 | — | — | — | — | — | — | — | — |
| 1934 * | Claude Reeds | OCAC | 7 | 2 | 0 | 5 | 0 | 0 | 1st | — | — | — | — |
| 1935 * | Claude Reeds | OCAC | 7 | 2 | 1 | — | — | — | T–1st | — | — | — | — |
| 1936 * | Claude Reeds | OCAC | 8 | 1 | 0 | 5 | 0 | 0 | 1st | — | — | — | — |
| 1937 * | Claude Reeds | OCAC | 6 | 2 | 2 | 4 | 0 | 1 | 1st | — | — | — | — |
| 1938 * | Claude Reeds | OCAC | 6 | 3 | 0 | 5 | 0 | 0 | 1st | — | — | — | — |
| 1939 * | Claude Reeds | OCAC | 5 | 3 | 1 | 5 | 0 | 1 | 1st | — | — | — | — |
| 1940 | Claude Reeds | OCAC | 2 | 5 | 2 | — | — | — | — | — | — | — | — |
| 1941 * | Dale E. Hamilton | OCAC | 6 | 2 | 0 | 6 | 0 | 0 | 1st | — | — | — | — |
| 1942 * | Dale E. Hamilton | OCAC | 7 | 0 | 0 | 2 | 0 | 0 | 1st | — | — | — | — |
| 1943-5 | No team due to World War II | | | | | | | | | | | | |
| 1946 | Dale E. Hamilton | OCAC | 4 | 4 | 1 | 3 | 1 | 1 | — | — | — | — | — |
| 1947 | Dale E. Hamilton | OCAC | 7 | 1 | 1 | 3 | 1 | 1 | — | — | — | — | — |
| 1948 * | Dale E. Hamilton | OCAC | 6 | 2 | 0 | 4 | 1 | 0 | T–1st | — | — | — | — |
| 1949 * | Dale E. Hamilton | OCAC | 7 | 2 | 0 | 5 | 0 | 0 | 1st | — | — | — | — |
| 1950 * | Gene Smith | OCAC | 7 | 3 | 0 | 4 | 1 | 0 | T–1st | — | — | — | — |
| 1951 | Gene Smith | OCAC | 2 | 6 | 0 | 2 | 3 | 0 | — | — | — | — | — |
| 1952 | Dale E. Hamilton | OCAC | 4 | 4 | 0 | 3 | 1 | 0 | — | — | — | — | — |
| 1953 | Dale E. Hamilton | OCAC | 6 | 3 | 0 | 3 | 2 | 0 | — | — | — | — | — |
| 1954 * | Dale E. Hamilton | OCAC | 6 | 2 | 1 | 4 | 1 | 0 | T–1st | — | — | — | — |
| 1955 * | Dale E. Hamilton | OCAC | 8 | 1 | 0 | 4 | 1 | 0 | T–1st | — | — | — | — |
| 1956 * | Dale E. Hamilton | OCAC | 7 | 2 | 0 | 4 | 1 | 0 | T–1st | — | — | — | — |
| 1957 | Dale E. Hamilton | OCAC | 5 | 2 | 0 | 2 | 2 | 0 | — | — | — | — | — |
| 1958 | Al Blevins | OCAC | 5 | 4 | 0 | 4 | 2 | 0 | — | — | — | — | — |
| 1959 | Al Blevins | OCAC | 8 | 1 | 0 | 5 | 1 | 0 | — | — | — | — | — |
| 1960 | Al Blevins | OCAC | 6 | 4 | 0 | 3 | 3 | 0 | — | — | — | — | — |
| 1961 * | Al Blevins | OCAC | 9 | 1 | 0 | 6 | 0 | 0 | 1st | — | — | — | — |
| 1962 †* | Al Blevins | OCAC | 11 | 0 | 0 | 6 | 0 | 0 | 1st | — | Won NAIA National Championship against Lenoir–Rhyne, 28–13 | — | — |
| 1963 | Al Blevins | OCAC | 4 | 4 | 1 | 3 | 3 | 0 | — | — | — | — | — |
| 1964 | Phil Ball | OCAC | 4 | 5 | 0 | 1 | 5 | 0 | — | — | — | — | — |
| 1965 | Phil Ball | OCAC | 6 | 3 | 1 | 4 | 1 | 1 | — | — | — | — | — |
| 1966 | Phil Ball | OCAC | 7 | 2 | 0 | 4 | 2 | 0 | — | — | — | — | — |
| 1966 | Phil Ball | OCAC | 3 | 6 | 1 | 1 | 5 | 1 | — | — | — | — | — |
| 1967 | Phil Ball | OCAC | 6 | 4 | 1 | 2 | 3 | 1 | — | — | — | — | — |
| 1969 | Phil Ball | OCAC | 8 | 1 | 1 | 4 | 1 | 1 | — | — | — | — | — |
| 1970 | Phil Ball | OCAC | 9 | 2 | 0 | 6 | 2 | 0 | — | — | — | — | — |
| 1971 | Phil Ball | OIC | 7 | 2 | 1 | 5 | 2 | 1 | — | — | — | — | — |
| 1972 * | Phil Ball | OIC | 9 | 2 | 0 | 7 | 1 | 0 | 1st | — | Lost NAIA Semifinals to East Texas State, 54–0 | — | — |
| 1973 | Phil Ball | OIC | 6 | 4 | 1 | 5 | 3 | 0 | — | — | — | — | — |
| 1974 | Phil Ball | OIC | 5 | 5 | 0 | 2 | 3 | 0 | — | — | — | — | — |
| 1975 | Phil Ball | OIC | 7 | 4 | 0 | 4 | 1 | 0 | — | — | — | — | — |
| 1976 | Phil Ball | Independent | 5 | 6 | 0 | — | — | — | — | — | — | — | — |
| 1977 | Gary Howard | Independent | 5 | 5 | 1 | — | — | — | — | — | — | — | — |
| 1978 | Gary Howard | Independent | 7 | 3 | 0 | — | — | — | — | — | — | — | — |
| 1979 | Gary Howard | Independent | 11 | 2 | 0 | — | — | — | — | — | Lost NAIA National Championship to Texas A&I, 20–14 | — | — |
| 1980 | Gary Howard | Independent | 5 | 4 | 0 | — | — | — | — | — | — | — | — |
| 1981 | Gary Howard | Independent | 7 | 2 | 0 | — | — | — | — | — | — | — | — |
| 1982 † | Gary Howard | Independent | 10 | 2 | 0 | — | — | — | — | — | Won NAIA National Championship against Mesa State, 14–11 | — | — |
| 1983 | Gary Howard | Independent | 8 | 1 | 1 | — | — | — | — | — | Lost NAIA First Round to Saginaw Valley State, 14–13 | — | — |
| 1984 | Gary Howard | Independent | 7 | 3 | 0 | — | — | — | — | — | — | — | — |
| 1985 | Gary Howard | Independent | 7 | 2 | 1 | — | — | — | — | — | Lost NAIA First Round to Henderson State, 18–15 | — | — |
| 1986 | Gary Howard | Independent | 3 | 5 | 1 | — | — | — | — | — | — | — | — |
| 1987 | Gary Howard | Independent | 2 | 8 | 0 | — | — | — | — | — | — | — | — |
| 1988 | Gary Howard | Lone Star | 4 | 5 | 0 | 4 | 3 | 0 | T–4th | — | — | — | — |
| 1989 | Gary Howard | Lone Star | 0 | 10 | 1 | 0 | 7 | 0 | 8th | — | — | — | — |
| 1990 | Gary Howard | Lone Star | 4 | 6 | 0 | 3 | 4 | 0 | 5th | — | — | — | — |
| 1991 | Gary Howard | Lone Star | 3 | 7 | 0 | 1 | 5 | 0 | T–5th | — | — | — | — |
| 1992 | Gary Howard | Lone Star | 6 | 4 | 0 | 2 | 4 | 0 | T–5th | — | — | — | — |
| 1993 | Gary Howard | Lone Star | 7 | 3 | 0 | 2 | 3 | 0 | 4th | — | — | — | — |
| 1994 | Gary Howard | Lone Star | 6 | 3 | 1 | 2 | 2 | 1 | 3rd | — | — | 20 | — |
| 1995 | Gary Howard | Lone Star | 8 | 3 | 0 | 4 | 3 | 0 | 4th | — | — | — | — |
| 1996 | Gary Howard | Lone Star | 9 | 3 | — (Note: Overtime rules in college football were introduced in 1996, making ties impossible in the period since.) | 5 | 2 | — | 2nd | — | Lost NCAA Second Round to UC Davis, 26–7 | 9 | — |
| 1997 | Gary Howard | Lone Star | 9 | 2 | — | 7 | 2 | — | 3rd | 1st | — | — | — |
| 1998 * | Gary Howard | Lone Star | 12 | 1 | — | 9 | 0 | — | 1st | 1st | Lost NCAA Second Round to Texas A&M–Kingsville, 21–24 | 1 | — |
| 1999 * | Gary Howard | Lone Star | 8 | 3 | — | 6 | 2 | — | T–1st | 2nd | Lost NCAA First Round to UC Davis, 17–33 | 18 | — |
| 2000 | Gary Howard | Lone Star | 5 | 5 | — | 5 | 3 | — | T–2nd | T–2nd | — | — | — |
| 2001 | Gary Howard | Lone Star | 3 | 8 | — | 1 | 7 | — | 12th | 6th | — | — | — |
| 2002 | Gary Howard | Lone Star | 5 | 6 | — | 4 | 4 | — | 8th | 4th | — | — | — |
| 2003 | Chuck Langston | Lone Star | 9 | 3 | — | 6 | 2 | — | T–2nd | T–2nd | Lost NCAA Second Round to Texas A&M–Kingsville, 6–49 | 20 | — |
| 2004 | Chuck Langston | Lone Star | 8 | 2 | — | 7 | 2 | — | T–2nd | T–1st | — | 21 | — |
| 2005 | Chuck Langston | Lone Star | 3 | 7 | — | 3 | 6 | — | 10th | T–3rd | — | — | — |
| 2006 | Chuck Langston | Lone Star | 5 | 6 | — | 4 | 5 | — | T–6th | T–4th | — | — | — |
| 2007 | Chuck Langston | Lone Star | 4 | 6 | — | 4 | 5 | — | 7th | T–1st | — | — | — |
| 2008 | Tracy Holland | Lone Star | 7 | 4 | — | 6 | 3 | — | T–3rd | 1st | — | — | — |
| 2009 | Tracy Holland | Lone Star | 4 | 7 | — | 4 | 5 | – | 9th | 3rd | — | — | — |
| 2010 | Tracy Holland | Lone Star | 2 | 9 | — | 2 | 8 | — | T–13th | 7th | — | — | — |
| 2011 | Tracy Holland | Independent | 2 | 9 | — | — | — | — | — | — | — | — | — |
| 2012 | Nick Bobeck | MIAA | 2 | 8 | — | 2 | 8 | — | T–13th | — | — | — | — |
| 2013 | Nick Bobeck | MIAA | 2 | 8 | — | 2 | 8 | — | T–11th | — | — | — | — |
| 2014 | Nick Bobeck | MIAA | 8 | 4 | — | 8 | 3 | — | 3rd | — | Lost Mineral Water Bowl to Sioux Falls, 42–10 | — | — |
| 2015 | Nick Bobeck | MIAA | 6 | 5 | — | 6 | 5 | — | T–5th | — | Won Live United Texarkana Bowl against Southwestern Oklahoma State, 38–21 | — | — |
| 2016 | Nick Bobeck | MIAA | 3 | 8 | — | 3 | 8 | — | T–8th | — | — | — | — |
| 2017 | Nick Bobeck | MIAA | 8 | 4 | — | 7 | 4 | — | T–4th | — | Won Corsicana Bowl against Tarleton State 38–31 | — | — |
| 2018 | Nick Bobeck | MIAA | 8 | 4 | — | 7 | 4 | — | T–4th | — | Won C.H.A.M.P.S. Heart of Texas Bowl against Angelo State 41–34 | — | — |
| 2019 | Nick Bobeck | MIAA | 5 | 6 | — | 5 | 6 | — | 8th | — | — | — | — |
| 2021 | Nick Bobeck | MIAA | 4 | 7 | — | 4 | 7 | — | T–8th | — | — | — | — |
| 2022 | Adam Dorrel | MIAA | 6 | 5 | — | 6 | 5 | — | 6th | — | — | — | — |
| 2023 | Adam Dorrel | MIAA | 5 | 6 | — | 4 | 6 | — | T–7th | — | — | — | — |
| 2024 * | Adam Dorrel | MIAA | 11 | 2 | — | 8 | 1 | — | 1st | — | Lost NCAA Second Round to Ferris State, 17–78 | 9 | 8 |
| Total | | | 650 | 431 | 47 | — | — | — | (only includes regular season games) | | | | |
| Total | | | 14 | 10 | 0 | — | — | — | (only includes playoff and bowl games; 14 appearances) | | | | |
| Total | | | 664 | 441 | 47 | — | — | — | (all games) | | | | |
