= List of Central Oklahoma Bronchos head football coaches =

The Central Oklahoma Bronchos football program is a college football team that represents the University of Central Oklahoma. The team has had 13 head coaches since organized football began in 1902. The Bronchos have played in more than 1,000 games in its 110 seasons. In those seasons, three coaches have led the Bronchos to postseason bowl games: Al Blevins, Gary Howard and, Chuck Langston. Seven coaches have won conference championships with the Bronchos: Charles W. Wantland, Claude Reeds, Dale E. Hamilton, Gene Smith, Blevins, Phil Ball, and Howard. Blevins, and Howard have also won national championships with the Bronchos. Howard is the all-time leader in games coached, years coached, and wins, while Blevins is the all-time leader in winning percentage. Tracy Holland is, in terms of winning percentage, the least successful coach the Bronchos have had as he has a .341 winning percentage.

Of the 14 Bronchos coaches, Reeds is the only person who has been inducted into the College Football Hall of Fame, albeit from his time as a player for the Oklahoma Sooners. The current coach is Adam Dorrel.

== Key ==
Key to symbols in coaches list
General		Overall		Conference		Postseason (Note: Although the first Rose Bowl Game was played in 1902, it has been continuously played since the 1916 game, and is recognized as the oldest bowl game by the NCAA. "—" indicates any season prior to 1916 when postseason games were not played.)	
No.	Order of coaches (Note: A running total of the number of head coaches, with coaches who served separate tenures being counted only once. Interim head coaches are represented with "Int" and are not counted in the running total. "—" indicates the team played but either without a coach or no coach is on record. "X" indicates an interim year without play.)	GC	Games coached	CW	Conference wins	PW	Postseason wins
DC	Division championships	OW	Overall wins	CL	Conference losses	PL	Postseason losses
CC	Conference championships	OL	Overall losses	CT	Conference ties	PT	Postseason ties
NC	National championships	OT	Overall ties (Note: Overtime rules in college football were introduced in 1996, making ties impossible in the period since.)	C%	Conference winning percentage		
†	Elected to the College Football Hall of Fame	O%	Overall winning percentage (Note: When computing the win–loss percentage, a tie counts as half a win and half a loss.)				

== Coaches ==
Statistics correct as of the end of the 2025 NCAA Division II football season

# (Note: A running total of the number of coaches of the Bronchos. Thus, any coach who has two or more separate terms as head coach is counted only once.)	Name	Term	GC	OW	OL	OT	O%	CW	CL	CT	C%	PW	PL	PT	CCs	NCs	National awards
-	No coach	1902	1	0	1	0	.000	—	—	—	—	—	—	—	—	—	—
1	Boyd Hill	1904	5	2	3	0	.400	—	—	—	—	—	—	—	—	—	—
2	Fenis Bently	1905–1911	53	19	30	4	.396	—	—	—	—	—	—	—	—	—	—
3	Charles W. Wantland	1912–1919, 1921–1930	160	101	43	16	.681	—	—	—	—	—	—	—	6	—	—
4	Ralph Myers	1920	8	4	3	1	.563	—	—	—	—	—	—	—	—	—	—
5	Claude Reeds†	1931–1940	93	57	28	8	.656	—	—	—	—	—	—	—	8	—	—
6	Dale E. Hamilton	1941–1942; 1946–1949; 1952–1957	101	73	25	3	.738	—	—	—	—	—	—	—	7	—	—
7	Gene Smith	1950–1951	18	9	9	0	.500	6	4	0	.600	—	—	—	1	—	—
8	Al Blevins	1958–1963	58	43	14	1	.750	—	—	—	—	2	0	0	2	1 – 1962	—
9	Phil Ball	1964–1976	134	82	46	6	.651	—	—	—	—	0	1	0	1	—	—
10	Gary Howard	1977–2002	273	162	105	6	.604	55	51	1	.519	7	6	0	2	1 – 1982	—
11	Chuck Langston	2003–2007	53	29	24	0	.527	24	22	0	.521	0	1	0	—	—	—
12	Tracy Holland	2008–2011	43	15	29	0	.341	12	16	0	.429	—	—	—	—	—	—
13	Nick Bobeck	2012–2021	101	47	54	0	.465	44	53	0	.454	3	1	0	—	—	—
14	Adam Dorrel	2022–present	46	28	18	—	.609	24	15	—	.615	1	1	—	1	—	—
