= 1942 Central State Bronchos football team =

American college football season

1942 Central State Bronchos football

OCC champion
- Conference: Oklahoma Collegiate Conference
- Record: 7–0 (2–0 OCC)
- Head coach: Dale E. Hamilton (2nd season)
- Home stadium: Central Field

The 1942 Central State Bronchos football team was an American football team that represented Central State College (presently, University of Central Oklahoma) during the 1942 college football season. In their second year under head coach Dale E. Hamilton, the Bronchos compiled a perfect 7–0 record and finished 2–0 in the Oklahoma Collegiate Conference enroute to a conference championship.

The 1942 season was one of the three perfect seasons in Central Oklahoma football history. The other two are the 1915 and 1962 seasons. The team played its home game at Central Field in Edmond, Oklahoma.

== Schedule ==
Date	Time	Opponent	Site	Result	Attendance	Source
October 9	8:00 p.m.	Will Rogers AB*	Central Field; Edmond, OK	W 28–0	2,000	
October 17		Northwestern Oklahoma State	Central Field; Edmond, OK	W 28–0		
October 30		at Oklahoma JV*	Norman, OK	W 35–0		
November 6		East Central	Central Field; Edmond, OK	W 29–6		
November 13		Oklahoma JV*	Central Field; Edmond, OK	W 44–0		
November 22		at Will Rogers AB*	Taft Stadium; Oklahoma City, OK	W 27–7		
November 26		at Southwest Missouri State*	SMS Stadium; Springfield, MO	W 29–6		
*Non-conference game; All times are in Central time
