= 2015 Lamar Cardinals football team =

American college football season

2015 Lamar Cardinals football
- Conference: Southland Conference
- Record: 5–6 (4–5 Southland)
- Head coach: Ray Woodard (6th season)
- Offensive coordinator: Chuck Langston (1st season)
- Offensive scheme: Spread
- Defensive coordinator: Craig McGallion (2nd season)
- Base defense: 3–4
- Home stadium: Provost Umphrey Stadium

2015 Southland Conference football standings
	Conf.			Overall
Team	W		L	W		L
No. 7 McNeese State $^	9	–	0	10	–	1
No. 3 Sam Houston State ^	7	–	2	11	–	4
Central Arkansas	7	–	2	7	–	4
Incarnate Word *	5	–	4	6	–	5
Lamar	4	–	5	5	–	6
Northwestern State	4	–	5	4	–	7
Stephen F. Austin	4	–	5	4	–	7
SE Louisiana	3	–	6	4	–	7
Abilene Christian *	3	–	6	3	–	8
Nicholls State	3	–	6	3	–	8
Houston Baptist	0	–	8	2	–	9
$ – Conference champion; ^ – FCS playoff participant; * – ineligible for FCS playoffs due to transition from NCAA Division II; Rankings from STATS poll

The 2015 Lamar Cardinals football team represented Lamar University in the 2015 NCAA Division I FCS football season. The Cardinals were led by sixth-year head coach Ray Woodard and played their home games at Provost Umphrey Stadium. They are a member of the Southland Conference.

The Cardinals finished the season with a 5–6 record overall. In Southland Conference play, the Cardinals finished in a three-way tie for fifth place with a 4–5 conference record.

== TV and radio media ==
All Lamar games were broadcast on KLVI, also known as News Talk 560.

Live video of all home games (except those broadcast via the American Sports Network or ESPN3) was streamed by Lamar University's Big Red Sports Network .

== Before the season ==
- Contract extension - On December 4, 2014, Lamar University announced that head football coach, Ray Woodard, had received a new three-year contract. The announcement followed the conclusion of an 8–4 season with a 5–3 conference record. The season also marked the Cardinals's first victory over a nationally ranked opponent since the return of a program Woodard had been originally hired to resurrect.
- Retirement - On February 4, 2015, the Cardinals's offensive coordinator, Larry Kueck, announced his retirement after twenty-nine (29) years in the coaching profession.
- Transfers out - Quarterbacks Rex Dausin and Robert Mitchell left the Lamar football program in January.
- Transfers in - Three players transferred in to the team before signing day. Cameron Hampton transferred to the Cardinals from the University of Texas Longhorns. Quarterback, Joe Minden, transferred to the Cardinals from conference foe, Stephen F. Austin. Quarterback, Carson Earp, transferred from Navarro College.

Another player transferred in after signing day. Defensive end, David Owens, transferred to the Cardinals from Hampton University in February.

=== 2015 recruits ===
Lamar signed 26 players on national letter of intent day. Recruits are listed in the "Class of 2015 Signees" table below. Player profiles for each recruit are available at the signing day link below. The 2015 recruits included 23 players from high school and 3 transfers. All three of the transfer players transferred from NCAA Division I (FBS) programs.

Signing Day Link:

=== Class of 2015 signees ===
2015 signees
Name	Pos.	Height	Weight	Year	Hometown	High School/Junior College	HS/TR
D C Arcenaux	LB	6'2"	230	Freshman	Kinder, LA	Kinder HS	HS
Jessie Brewster	OL	6'7"	285	Freshman	Friendswood, TX	Friendswood HS	HS
Chaston Brooks	ATH	6'1"	190	Freshman	Tatum, TX	Tatum HS	HS
Bear Christianson	LB	6'6"	205	Freshman	Austin, TX	Vandegrift HS	HS
Ethan Cothen	OL	6'4"	280	Freshman	Beaumont, TX	Westbrook HS	HS
Stelen Covel	DT	6'2"	260	Freshman	Oklahoma City, OK	Casady HS	HS
Brett Cox	QB	6'4"	200	Freshman	Sachse, TX	Sachse HS	HS
David Dorsett	DE	6'3"	240	Freshman	Fort Worth, TX	LD Bell HS	HS
Dedrick Garner	LB	6'3"	220	Freshman	Fairfield, TX	Fairfield HS	HS
Zae Giles	CB	5'9"	170	Freshman	Austin, TX	Lyndon B. Johnson HS	HS
Tariq Gordon	WR/CB	6'0"	175	Freshman	Southlake, TX	Southlake HS	HS
Joseph Gonzales	OL	6'4"	285	Freshman	Waco, TX	Waco HS	HS
JoJo Henderson	FS	6'3"	190	Freshman	Salt Lake City, UT	Olympus HS	HS
Davon Jernigan	SS	6'09"	184	Freshman	Navasota, TX	Navasota HS	HS
Hayden Kaaiohelo	OL	6'5"	285	Freshman	Edmond, OK	Edmond Memorial HS	HS
Jerbrell Lipscomb	LB	5'9"	184	Freshman	Navasota, TX	Navasota HS	HS
Duncan McVey	TE	6'4"	220	Freshman	Deer Park, TX	Deer Park HS	HS
Keegan Mitchell	RB	5'6"	172	Freshman	Corrigan, TX	Corrigan–Camden HS	HS
Corey Nance	OL	6'7"	275	Freshman	Liberty, TX	Hardin HS	HS
Marcus Odell	LB	6'2"	225	Freshman	New Braunfels, TX	New Braunfels HS	HS
Kevin O'Neill	LB	6'2"	205	Freshman	Sachse, TX	Sachse HS	HS
Derrion Randle	RB	5'10"	200	Freshman	Navasota, TX	Navasota HS	HS
Rodney Randle, Jr.	DB	5'10"	175	Freshman	Beaumont, TX	Ozen HS	HS
Brendan Langley	WR	6'1"	188	Sophomore	Marietta, GA	Kell HS/Georgia	TR
Matthew Oubre	OL	6'1"	289	Freshman	Dayton, TX	Dayton HS/Louisiana–Monroe	TR
Dominique Wheeler	WR	6'1"	186	Junior	Crockett, TX	Crockett HS/Texas Tech	TR

=== 5th Crawfish Bowl ===
The 5th Annual Red-White Crawfish Bowl was held Saturday, March 7. The team was divided into Red and White teams as in previous years. A draft of ten rounds was held with each side picking players of the same position. Offensive linemen were not drafted. They played for both teams. The White team got the first pick of the draft since the Red team got first pick of coaches. The draft was streamed live over Lamar's Big Red Sports Network.

The game was divided into four ten-minute quarters with a 15-minute half time. Kickoffs, kick returns, and turnovers were live. Field goals and extra points were not live. The White team won 7–3 with all scores in the second quarter.

== Roster ==
2015 Lamar Cardinals football team roster
Players
Coaches
Offense

Pos.	#	Name	Class
RB	1	Carl Harris	Sr
QB	2	Brett Cox	Fr
RB	3	Devonn Brown	Sr
WR	4	Jayce Nelson	Sr
WR	5	Brendan Langley	So
WR	6	Gratian Gladney	Sr
WR	7	Michael Handy	Jr
RB	8	Kade Harrington	Jr
WR	9	Reggie Begelton	Sr
QB	10	Joe Minden	Sr
QB	11	Carson Earp	Jr
QB	12	Steadman Bell	Fr
WR/DB	12	Tariq Gordon	Fr
RB	22	Emmett Raleigh	Jr
RB	26	Derrion Randle	Fr
RB	33	Cody Dupuy	So
RB	42	Keegan Mitchell	Fr
RB	49	Mark Brown	So
OL	58	Bret Treadway	Jr
OL	59	Richard Alfonso	Jr
OL	60	Cody Elenz	Jr
OL	61	Blaine Myers	So
OL	62	Seth Adams	Fr
OL	63	Connor Ward	So
OL	64	Barrett Myers	Fr
OL	66	Chase Woods	So
OL	67	Hunter Rising	So
OL	68	Jessie Brewster	Fr
OL	69	Matthew Oubre	So
OL	72	Ethan Cothen	Fr
OL	73	Joseph Gonzales	Fr
OL	74	Kevin Greif	So
OL	76	Justin Brock	Sr
OL	77	Hayden Kaaiohelo	Fr
OL	78	John Craven	Jr
WR	80	Martell Hawthorne	Fr
WR	81	Caleb Hobbs	So
WR	82	Dominique Wheeler	Jr
TE	83	Tate Smith	Fr
TE	85	Brannon Beaton	Jr
TE	88	Duncan McVey	Fr
TE	89	Garrett Drake	Jr

Defense

Pos.	#	Name	Class
DB	2	DaQuan Steward	Sr
DB	10	Devon Jernigan	Fr
DB	12	Colby Campbell	Jr
DB	13	JoJo Henderson	Fr
DB	14	Jebrell Lipscomb	Fr
DB	15	Seth Ellis	Sr
DB	16	Judge Wolfe	So
DB	18	Zae Giles	Fr
DB	19	LaDamian Coney	So
DB	20	Rodney Randle, JR	Fr
DB	21	Michael Sheridan	Sr
DB	23	Lloyd Julian	Jr
LB	24	Mike Hargis	Sr
DB	25	Tommie Barrett	Jr
DB	27	Reid Entsminger	So
LB	28	Zach Johnson	Jr
LB	29	Xavier Bethany	Jr
LB	30	Dedrick Garner	Jr
LB	32	Anthony Beard	Sr
DB	34	Tristan Ridge	Jr
LB	35	Cameron Hampton	Fr
DB	36	Ty Johnson	Jr
DB	37	Ronald Barrett	Jr
LB	38	Eddie McGill	Jr
LB	40	Shawn Jones	So
LB	41	Bear Christianson	Fr
LB	44	Ronny Jones Jr	Sr
LB	45	Matt Tillett	So
LB	47	Kade Burman	So
LB	48	Kevin O'Neill	Fr
LB	49	Marcus Odell	Fr
LB	50	Cole Carleton	So
LB	52	Reggie Long	So
DL	53	David Hollyfield	Sr
LB	55	Matt Johnson	Jr
DL	56	David Owens	Jr
LB	57	Kevin Gunnells	Sr
LB	59	Johnny Morris	Sr
DL	62	Seth Adams	So
DL	65	Omar Tebo	Jr
DB	86	Jared Gieseke	So
DL	90	David Dorsett	Fr
LB	91	Logan Moss	Sr
DL	92	Koby Couron	Jr
DL	95	Joshua Frost	Sr
DL	97	Larance Hale	So
DL	98	Marcus Abbott	Fr
DL	99	Corbin Carr	Jr

Special teams

Pos.	#	Name	Class
ATH	11	Chaston Brooks	Fr
K/P	31	Juan Carranco	Jr
DS	43	Brent Nicholson	Sr
K	46	Alex Ball	Jr
DS	54	Zach Roberts	So
K	96	Josh Davis	So

Head coach

- Ray Woodard (Texas)

Coordinators/assistant coaches

- Carey Bailey (Tennessee)
  Asst. head coach/defensive line
- Chuck Langston (Oklahoma)
  Offensive coordinator/offensive line
- Craig McGallion (Houston)
  Defensive coordinator
- Arlington Nunn (Clemson)
  Receivers
- Ben Beasley (McNeese State)
  Secondary, recruiting coordinator
- Mark Criner (Boise State)
  Linebackers
- Brian Morgan (Grambling State)
  Running backs
- Ramon Flanigan (SMU)
  Quarterbacks
- Josh Miller (Southeastern Louisiana)
  Strength & conditioning
- Brett Ramsey (Lamar)
  Director of football operations

Legend

- (C) Team captain
- (S) Suspended
- (I) Ineligible
- Injured
- Redshirt

Roster

== Schedule ==
Lamar University announced its 2015 football schedule on February 24, 2015. According to the announcement, the 2015 schedule consisted of eleven games with an expanded conference schedule of nine games. Out of conference games included the season opener against the Bacone College Warriors, a NAIA member from the Red River Athletic Conference, followed by an away game against the NCAA Division I (FBS) Big 12 Conference member, Baylor Bears. Five of the games, including four Southland Conference games, were played at home at Provost Umphrey Stadium. There were no consecutive home games in the schedule.

Date	Time	Opponent	Site	TV	Result	Attendance
September 5	7:00 pm	Bacone*	Provost Umphrey Stadium; Beaumont, TX	BRSN	W 66–3	9,668
September 12	6:30 pm	at No. 4 (FBS) Baylor*	McLane Stadium; Waco, TX	FSN	L 31–66	44,491
September 19	6:00 pm	at No. 3 Sam Houston State	Bowers Stadium; Huntsville, TX	ASN	W 49–46	10,116
October 1	6:00 pm	at No. 22 Southeastern Louisiana	Strawberry Stadium; Hammond, LA	ASN	L 27–30	4,520
October 10	7:00 pm	Abilene Christian	Provost Umphrey Stadium; Beaumont, TX	ESPN3	W 44–28	13,136
October 17	6:00 pm	at Northwestern State	Harry Turpin Stadium; Natchitoches, LA		L 35–48	9,133
October 24	6:00 pm	Central Arkansas	Provost Umphrey Stadium; Beaumont, TX	ESPN3	L 17–35	6,476
October 31	2:00 pm	at Houston Baptist	Husky Stadium; Houston, TX	RTSW	W 55–7	1,748
November 7	6:00 pm	Nicholls State^{†}	Provost Umphrey Stadium; Beaumont, TX	BRSN	L 28–30	7,730
November 14	2:00 pm	at Incarnate Word	Gayle and Tom Benson Stadium; San Antonio, TX		W 28–21	4,402
November 21	6:00 pm	No. 3 McNeese State	Provost Umphrey Stadium; Beaumont, TX	ESPN3	L 14–20	9,808
*Non-conference game; ^{†}Homecoming; Rankings from STATS Poll released prior to the game; All times are in Central time

The Houston Baptist/Lamar game was televised on tape delay.

== Game summaries ==
=== Bacone College ===
Bacone College at Lamar

Team	1	2	3	4	Total
Warriors	0	0	0	3	3
• Cardinals	14	31	14	7	66

- Date: September 5
- Location: Provost Umphrey Stadium
  Beaumont, TX
- Game start: 7:00 PM CDT
- Elapsed time: 2:57
- Game attendance: 9,668
- Game weather: 83°F • Clear Skies
- Referee: Ross Smith
- TV announcers (Live Streaming - BRSN): Harold Mann (Play-by-Play), Bo Brown (Analyst)

Scoring summary
1	13:35	Lamar	Handy, Michael 9 yd pass from Minden, Joe (Ball, Alex kick ),3 plays, 15 yards, TOP 0:33	7–0
1	7:04	Lamar	Jennings, DeAnd 12 yd pass from Minden, Joe (Ball, Alex kick ),10 plays, 70 yards, TOP 3:43	14–0
2	8:37	Lamar	Ball, Alex 38 yd field goal, 11 plays, 46 yards, TOP 3:58	17–0
2	7:14	Lamar	Harrington, Kad 5 yd run (Ball, Alex kick ), 2 plays, 39 yards, TOP 0:20	24–0
2	2:25	Lamar	Hawthorne, Mart 19 yd pass from Earp, Carson (Ball, Alex kick ) 5 plays, 70 yards, TOP 2:16	31–0
2	1:55	Lamar	Mitchell, Keega 1 yd run (Ball, Alex kick ), 1 plays, 1 yards, TOP 0:05	38–0
2	1:06	Lamar	Begelton, Reggi 21 yd pass from Earp, Carson (Ball, Alex kick ), 1 plays, 21 yards, TOP 0:06	45–0
3	7:41	Lamar	Gladney, Gratia 36 yd pass from Minden, Joe (Ball, Alex kick ), 6 plays, 75 yards, TOP 2:06	52–0
3	1:43	Lamar	Raleigh, Emmitt 1 yd run (Ball, Alex kick ), 7 plays, 60 yards, TOP 3:23	59–0
4	6:03	Bacone	Pearce, Blake 24 yd field goal, 5 plays, 38 yards, TOP 1:32	59–3
4	4:55	Lamar	Atoyebi, Emmanu 22 yd run (Ball, Alex kick ), 2 plays, 30 yards, TOP 0:57	66–3

=== @ Baylor ===
Lamar at Baylor

Team	1	2	3	4	Total
Cardinals	7	14	3	7	31
• Bears	13	22	14	17	66

- Date: September 12
- Location: McLane Stadium
  Waco, TX
- Game start: 6:30 PM CDT
- Elapsed time: 3:55
- Game attendance: 44,491
- Game weather: 85°F • Clear Skies • N 13 mph
- Referee: Dan Romero
- TV announcers (FSN): Brendan Burke (Play-by-Play), Ben Leber (Analyst), Christian Steckel (Sideline)

Scoring summary
1	10:50	Baylor	Linwood, Shock 1 yd run (Callahan, Chris kick ), 11 plays, 67 yards, TOP 2:50	0–7
1	5:36	Lamar	Harrington, Kad 11 yd run (Ball, Alex kick ), 10 plays, 87 yards, TOP 5:14	7–7
1	1:17	Baylor	Coleman, Corey 42 yd pass from Russell, Seth (Edmiston, Cole rush failed) 3 plays, 77 yards, TOP 0:30	7–13
2	13:07	Lamar	Harrington, Kad 1 yd run (Ball, Alex kick ), 5 plays, 36 yards, TOP 1:32	14–13
2	10:32	Baylor	Coleman, Corey 21 yd pass from Russell, Seth (Chafin, Devin rush ) 9 plays, 79 yards, TOP 2:35	14–21
2	4:34	Lamar	Minden, Joe 1 yd run (Ball, Alex kick ), 3 plays, 19 yards, TOP 1:11	21–21
2	3:51	Baylor	Coleman, Corey 61 yd pass from Russell, Seth (Callahan, Chris kick ) 3 plays, 75 yards, TOP 0:43	21–28
2	0:35	Baylor	Linwood, Shock 13 yd run (Callahan, Chris kick ), 7 plays, 43 yards, TOP 1:52	21–35
3	14:04	Baylor	Coleman, Corey 34 yd pass from Russell, Seth (Callahan, Chris kick ) 4 plays, 75 yards, TOP 0:56	21–42
3	8:23	Lamar	Ball, Alex 31 yd field goal 4 plays, -2 yards, TOP 0:52	24–42
3	2:33	Baylor	Linwood, Shock 7 yd run (Callahan, Chris kick ), 6 plays, 65 yards, TOP 1:33	24–49
4	12:14	Baylor	Callahan, Chris 36 yd field goal 9 plays, 55 yards, TOP 1:50	24–52
4	9:28	Baylor	Jefferson, J. 46 yd run (Callahan, Chris kick ), 5 plays, 77 yards, TOP 1:28	24–59
4	6:40	Lamar	Langley, Brenda 20 yd pass from Minden, Joe (Ball, Alex kick ) 7 plays, 84 yards, TOP 2:48	31–59
4	1:04	Baylor	Stidham, Jarrett 13 yd run (Callahan, Chris kick ), 16 plays, 77 yards, TOP 5:36	31–66

=== @ Sam Houston State ===
Lamar at Sam Houston State

Team	1	2	3	4	Total
• Cardinals	14	21	0	14	49
#3 Bearkats	14	0	9	23	46

- Date: September 19
- Location: Bowers Stadium
  Huntsville, TX
- Game start: 6:00 PM CDT
- Elapsed time: 4:01
- Game attendance: 10,116
- TV announcers (ASN): Randy McIlvoy (Play-by-Play), Shea Walker (Analyst), Chris Mycoskie (Sideline)

Scoring summary
1	9:20	Lamar	Reggi Begelton 4 yard pass from Carson Earp (Alex Ball kick), 11 plays, 56 yards, 4:53	7–0
1	7:50	Sam Houston State	Yedidiah Louis 46 yard pass from Jeremi Briscoe (Luc Swimberghe kick), 5 plays, 75 yards, 1:30	7–7
1	4:01	Lamar	Reggi Begelton 19 yard pass from Carson Earp (Alex Ball kick), 4 plays, 76 yards, 0:49	14–7
1	2:18	Sam Houston State	Donav Williams 8 yard pass from Jared Johnson (Luc Swimberghe kick), 7 plays, 75 yards, 1:43	14–14
2	12:40	Lamar	Kad Harrington 77 yard pass from Carson Earp (Alex Ball kick), 3 plays, 91 yards, 1:01	21–14
2	5:51	Lamar	Kad Harrington 5 yard run (Alex Ball kick), 6 plays, 89 yards, 2:45	28–14
2	1:29	Lamar	Devonn Brown 18 yard pass from Carson Earp (Alex Ball kick), 5 plays, 82 yards, 2:24	35–14
3	9:06	Sam Houston State	Luc Swimberghe 36 yard field goal 10 plays, 43 yards, 4:38	35–17
3	1:08	Sam Houston State	Donav Williams 5 yard run (Jared Johnson pass failed), 13 plays, 59 yards, 4:12	35–23
4	14:55	Sam Houston State	Team Safety	35–25
4	9:17	Lamar	Carl Harris 27 yard run (Alex Ball kick), 4 plays, 73 yards, 2:04	42–25
4	7:51	Sam Houston State	Gerald Thomas 55 yard pass from Jared Johnson (Luc Swimberghe kick) 5 plays, 75 yards, 1:26	42–32
4	4:59	Sam Houston State	Jared Johnson 16 yard run (Luc Swimberghe kick), 3 plays, 81 yards, 2:18	42–39
4	3:21	Lamar	Kad Harrington 73 yard run (Alex Ball kick), 3 plays, 80 yards, 1:27	49–39
4	0:58	Sam Houston State	Jared Johnson 6 yard run (Luc Swimberghe kick), 6 plays, 70 yards, 2:23	49–46

=== @ Southeastern Louisiana ===
Lamar at Southeastern Louisiana

Team	1	2	3	4	Total
Cardinals	0	14	10	3	27
• #22 Lions	13	0	10	7	30

- Date: October 1
- Location: Strawberry Stadium
  Hammond, LA
- Game start: 6:00 PM CDT
- Elapsed time: 3:32
- Game attendance: 4,520
- Game weather: 84°F, NNW 10 Wind, Clear
- Referee: Kevin Hassell
- TV announcers (ASN): Lyn Rollins (Play-by-Play), Rene Nadeau (Analyst), Chris Mycoskie (Sideline)

Scoring summary
1	12:59	Southeastern Louisiana	D'Shaie Landor pass complete to Jeff Smiley for 67 yds for a TD, (Jonathon Tatum KICK), 3 plays, 69 yards, 1:22	0–7
1	1:14	Southeastern Louisiana	D'Shaie Landor run for 5 yds for a TD, (Jonathon Tatum PAT MISSED), 9 plays, 95 yards, 4:42	0–13
2	10:40	Lamar	Carson Earp pass complete to Reggie Begelton for 26 yds for a TD, (Alex Ball KICK), 6 plays, 80 yards, 1:50	7–13
2	5:05	Lamar	Kade Harrington run for 3 yds for a TD, (Alex Ball KICK), 3 plays, 65 yards, 0:48	14–13
3	11:27	Lamar	Alex Ball 20 yd FG GOOD, 5 plays, 23 yards, 1:58	17–13
3	5:53	Southeastern Louisiana	Jonathon Tatum 40 yd FG GOOD, 10 plays, 52 yards, 5:34	17–16
3	5:41	Lamar	Harrison Heim kickoff for 52 yds, Rodney Randle return for 87 yds for a TD, (Alex Ball KICK), 0 plays, 0 yards, 0:00	24–16
3	2:37	Southeastern Louisiana	D'Shaie Landor run for 5 yds for a TD, (Jonathon Tatum KICK), 6 plays, 41 yards, 2:54	24–23
4	8:00	Lamar	Alex Ball 20 yd FG GOOD, 13 plays, 70 yards, 4:53	27–23
4	1:19	Southeastern Louisiana	Kody Sutton run for 1 yd for a TD, (Jonathon Tatum KICK), 17 plays, 79 yards, 6:36	27–30

=== Abilene Christian ===
Abilene Christian at Lamar

Team	1	2	3	4	Total
Wildcats	0	0	14	14	28
• Cardinals	7	17	10	10	44

- Date: October 10
- Location: Provost Umphrey Stadium
  Beaumont, TX
- Game start: 7:00 PM CDT
- Elapsed time: 3:16
- Game attendance: 13,136
- Referee: Brandon Cruse
- Television network: ESPN3

Scoring summary
1	4:05	Lamar	Joe Minden pass complete to Reggie Begelton for 10 yds for a TD, (Alex Ball kick), 13 plays, 77 yards, 4:47	7–0
2	12:07	Lamar	Kade Harrington run for 80 yds for a TD, (Alex Ball kick), 1 play, 80 yards, 0:12	14–0
2	5:28	Lamar	Alex Ball 21 yd field goal, 4 plays, 4 yards, 2:00	17–0
2	0:26	Lamar	Joe Minden pass complete to Michael Handy for 13 yds for a TD, (Alex Ball kick), 6 plays, 62 yards, 2:09	24–0
3	9:35	Abilene Christian	Parker McKenzie pass complete to Cedric Gilbert for 19 yds for a TD, (Zach Lehr kick), 8 plays, 60 yards, 4:19	24–7
3	6:34	Lamar	Alex Ball 38 yd field goal, 9 plays, 54 yards, 3:01	27–7
3	2:37	Lamar	Joe Minden pass complete to Devonn Brown for 8 yds for a TD, (Alex Ball kick), 10 plays, 49 yards, 3:43	34–7
3	1:49	Abilene Christian	Parker McKenzie pass complete to Jonathan Epps for 58 yds for a TD, (Zach Lehr kick), 3 plays, 69 yards, 0:41	34–14
4	13:30	Abilene Christian	Herschel Sims run for 2 yds for a TD, (Zach Lehr kick), 4 plays, 65 yards, 1:25	34–21
4	11:05	Lamar	Kade Harrington run for 62 yds for a TD, (Alex Ball kick), 5 plays, 73 yards, 2:19	41–21
4	2:47	Lamar	Alex Ball 41 yd field goal, 5 plays, 11 yards, 2:46	44–21
4	0:37	Abilene Christian	Parker McKenzie pass complete to Cedric Gilbert for 1 yd for a TD, (Zach Lehr kick), 7 plays, 74 yards, 2:03	44–28

=== @ Northwestern State ===
Lamar at Northwestern State

Team	1	2	3	4	Total
Cardinals	0	14	7	14	35
• Demons	14	17	3	14	48

- Date: October 17
- Location: Harry Turpin Stadium
  Natchitoches, LA
- Game start: 6:00 PM CDT
- Elapsed time: 3:31
- Game attendance: 9,133
- Game weather: Temp: 77 • Wind: NE 9 mph • Sunny and mild
- Referee: Scott Campbell

Scoring summary
1	12:43	Northwestern State	Daniel Taylor 12 yard run (Chris Moore kick), 4 plays, 67 yards, 2:17	0–7
1	03:47	Northwestern State	De'Mar Llorens 53 yard run (Chris Moore kick), 4 plays, 64 yards, 1:20	0–14
2	14:26	Northwestern State	Chris Moore 26 yard field goal 9 plays, 58 yards, 3:31	0–17
2	14:13	Lamar	Kad Harrington 79 yard run (Alex Ball kick), 1 plays, 75 yards, 0:13	7–17
2	9:31	Northwestern State	Shakeir Ryan 22 yard pass from Stephen Rivers (Chris Moore kick) 5 plays, 60 yards, 1:45	7–24
2	8:13	Lamar	Kad Harrington 5 yard run (Alex Ball kick), 3 plays, 59 yards, TOP 1:10	14–24
2	00:13	Northwestern State	Zach White 2 yard pass from Rivers, Stephen (Chris Moore kick) 8 plays, 68 yards, 3:27	14–31
3	12:35	Lamar	Kad Harrington 2 yard run (Alex Ball kick), 6 plays, 65 yards, 2:25	21–31
3	02:54	Northwestern State	Chris Moore 28 yard field goal 11 plays, 55 yards, 5:50	21–34
4	14:17	Northwestern State	Adam Jones 95 yard fumble recovery (Chris Moore kick)	21–41
4	11:36	Lamar	Kad Harrington 3 yard run (Alex Ball kick), 7 plays, 42 yards, 2:36	28–41
4	08:16	Northwestern State	De'Mar Llorens 1 yard run (Chris Moore kick), 6 plays, 59 yards, 3:19	28–48
4	05:41	Lamar	Kad Harrington 2 yard run (Alex Ball kick), 8 plays, 75 yards, 2:35	35–48

=== Central Arkansas ===
Central Arkansas at Lamar

Team	1	2	3	4	Total
• Bears	15	6	7	7	35
Cardinals	0	3	14	0	17

- Date: October 24
- Location: Provost Umphrey Stadium
  Beaumont, TX
- Game start: 6:00 PM CDT
- Elapsed time: 3:03
- Game attendance: 6,476
- Game weather: 74°F • Rain
- Referee: Ross Smith
- TV announcers (ESPN3): Randy McIlvoy, Shea Walker

Scoring summary
1	4:50	Central Arkansas	Blake Veasley 1 yard run (Scott Matiaha run for two-point conv.), 11 plays, 85 yards, 4:37	0–8
1	0:50	Central Arkansas	Blake Veasley 14 yard run (Jace Denker kick), 5 plays, 48 yards, 1:53	0–15
2	7:59	Lamar	Alex Ball 23 yard field goal, 6 plays, 69 yards, 2:02	3–15
2	1:46	Central Arkansas	Jace Denker 21 yard field goal, 14 plays, 58 yards, 6:06	3–18
2	0:00	Central Arkansas	Jace Denker 21 yard field goal, 8 plays, 55 yards, 1:04	3–21
3	12:38	Central Arkansas	Blake Veasley 56 yard run (Jace Denker kick), 3 plays, 70 yards, 1:02	3–28
3	12:28	Lamar	Kade Harrington 65 yard run (Alex Ball kick), 1 play, 65 yards, 0:10	10–28
3	1:44	Lamar	Kade Harrington 50 yard run (Alex Ball kick), 5 play, 80 yards, 1:50	17–28
4	12:38	Central Arkansas	Blake Veasley 19 yard run (Jace Denker kick), 2 plays, 22 yards, 0:44	17–35

=== @ Houston Baptist ===
Lamar at Houston Baptist

Team	1	2	3	4	Total
• Cardinals	14	20	14	7	55
Huskies	0	7	0	0	7

- Date: October 31
- Location: Husky Stadium
  Houston, TX
- Game start: 2:00 PM CDT
- Elapsed time: 3:02
- Game attendance: 1,748
- Game weather: Temp: 73 Wind: E 4 mph Weather: Overcast
- Referee: Randy Christal
- Television network: RTSW*

Scoring summary
1	13:09	Lamar	Kade Harrington 29 yd pass from Joe Minden (Alex Ball kick ) 6 plays, 74 yards, TOP 1:51	7–0
1	3:29	Lamar	Devonne Brown 29 yd pass from Joe Minden (Alex Ball kick ) 8 plays, 76 yards, TOP 2:36	14-0
2	14:20	Lamar	Alex Ball 49 yd field goal 7 plays, 51 yards, TOP 2:03	17-0
2	9:10	Lamar	Alex Ball 27 yd field goal 11 plays, 44 yards, TOP 3:37	20-0
2	4:52	Lamar	Kade Harrington 7 yd run (Alex Ball kick ), 6 plays, 48 yards, TOP 2:31	27-0
2	2:52	Lamar	Devonn Brown 45 yd pass from Joe Minden (Alex Ball kick ) 2 plays, 61 yards, TOP 0:37	34-0
2	00:41	Houston Baptist	Tony Dawson 34 yd run (Travis Shinn kick ), 7 plays, 75 yards, TOP 2:11	34-7
3	10:40	Lamar	Seth Ellis 73 yd punt return (Alex Ball kick )	41-7
3	5:23	Lamar	Kade Harrington 9 yd run (Alex Ball kick ), 9 plays, 62 yards, TOP 3:43	48-7
4	3:07	Lamar	Carson Earp 9 yd run (Alex Ball kick ), 4 plays, 61 yards, TOP 2:11	55-7

- Game will be televised on tape delay.

=== Nicholls (Homecoming Game) ===
Nicholls at Lamar

Team	1	2	3	4	Total
• Colonels	7	7	13	3	30
Cardinals	14	7	7	0	28

- Date: November 7
- Location: Provost Umphrey Stadium
  Beaumont, TX
- Game start: 7:00 PM CST
- Elapsed time: 3:07
- Game attendance: 7,730
- Game weather: 64°F • NNE 15 mph • Rain and Windy
- Referee: Mike Vanderveld
- Television network: Live Streaming - Big Red Sports Network

Scoring summary
1	10:36	Lamar	Kade Harrington 9 yard run (Alex Ball kick), 11 plays, 90 yards, 4:24	7–0
1	9:33	Nicholls	Michael Henry 2 yard run (Francisco Condado kick), 4 plays, 82 yards, 0:59	7–7
1	7:52	Lamar	Kade Harrington 68 yard run (Alex Ball kick), 4 plays, 78 yards, 1:36	14–7
2	11:39	Lamar	Carson Earp 72 yard run (Alex Ball kick), 2 plays, 62 yards, 0:35	21–7
2	8:13	Nicholls	Tobias Lofton 82 yard run (Francisco Condado kick), 3 plays, 91 yards, 1:20	21–14
3	11:37	Nicholls	Michael Henry 9 yard run (Francisco Condado kick), 9 plays, 54 yards, 3:17	21–21
3	10:23	Lamar	Joe Minden 12 yard run (Alex Ball Kick), 4 plays, 69 yards, 1:10	28–21
3	5:08	Nicholls	Landry Klann 5 yard run (Francisco Condado PAT failed), 11 plays, 75 yards, 5:15	28–27
4	2:46	Nicholls	Francisco Condado 28 yard field goal, 9 plays, 56 yards, 4:15	28–30

=== @ Incarnate Word ===
Lamar at Incarnate Word

Team	1	2	3	4	Total
• Cardinals (LU)	7	0	7	14	28
Cardinals (UIW)	0	7	0	14	21

- Date: November 14
- Location: Gayle and Tom Benson Stadium
  San Antonio, TX
- Game start: 2:00 PM CST
- Elapsed time: 2:57
- Game attendance: 4,402
- Game weather: Temp: 61 Wind: NE 2 Weather: Overcast and cool
- Referee: Randy Christal

Scoring summary
1	10:26	Lamar	Kad Harrington 9 yard run (Alex Ball kick), 10 plays, 75 yards, TOP 4:44	7–0
2	6:35	Incaranate Word	Justin Roberts 31 yard interception return (Cody Seidel kick)	7–7
3	3:38	Lamar	Brenda Langley 86 yard interception return (Alex Ball kick)	14–7
4	14:52	Lamar	Kad Harrington 45 yard run (Alex Ball kick), 6 plays, 73 yards, TOP 2:12	21–7
4	14:14	Incarnate Word	Junio Sessions 2 yard run (Cody Seidel kick), 2 plays, 75 yards, TOP 0:38	21–14
4	8:50	Lamar	Mart Hawthorne 7 yard pass from Minden, Joe (Alex Ball kick) 11 plays, 84 yards, TOP 5:15	28–14
4	3:44	Incarnate Word	Trent Brittain 2 yard run (Cody Seidel kick), 14 plays, 75 yards, TOP 5:06	28–21

=== McNeese State ===
McNeese State at Lamar

Team	1	2	3	4	Total
• #3 Cowboys	17	0	0	3	20
Cardinals	7	0	0	7	14

- Date: November 21
- Location: Provost Umphrey Stadium
  Beaumont, TX
- Game start: 6:00 PM CST
- Elapsed time: 3:11
- Game attendance: 9,808
- Game weather: Temp: 62 Wind: 17 mph Weather: Cloudy and Windy
- Referee: Randy Christal
- Television network: ESPN3

Scoring summary
1	11:59	McNeese State	Breaux, Jean 32 yd field goal 5 plays, 22 yards, TOP 1:49	3–0
1	6:19	Lamar	Garner, Dedrick 66 yd fumble recovery (Ball, Alex kick )	3-7
1	5:30	McNeese State	Ross, Ryan 26 yd run (Breaux, Jean kick ), 3 plays, 75 yards, TOP 0:49	10-7
1	00:36	McNeese State	Sams, Daniel 32 yd run (Breaux, Jean kick ), 6 plays, 67 yards, TOP 3:04	17-7
4	8:46	McNeese State	Breaux, Jean 31 yd field goal 8 plays, 35 yards, TOP 3:48	20-7
4	4:42	Lamar	Brown, Devonn 32 yd pass from Minden, Joe (Ball, Alex kick ) 3 plays, 45 yards, TOP 0:33	20-14
