= 1982 Central State Bronchos football team =

American college football season

1982 Central State Bronchos football

NAIA Division I champion

NAIA Division I Championship, W 14–11 vs. Mesa
- Conference: Independent
- Record: 10–2
- Head coach: Gary Howard (6th season)
- Home stadium: Wantland Stadium

1982 NAIA Division I independents football records
	Conf.			Overall
Team	W	L	T	W		L		T
No. 7 Central State (OK) ^		–		10	–	2	–	0
No. 9 Wofford		–		8	–	3	–	0
No. 19 Liberty Baptist		–		7	–	4	–	0
Guilford		–		5	–	5	–	0
Cameron		–		4	–	5	–	0
Eastern New Mexico		–		4	–	6	–	0
Kentucky State		–		2	–	9	–	0
Langston		–		0	–	10	–	0
^ – NAIA Division I playoff participant; Rankings from NAIA Division I poll

The 1982 Central State Bronchos football team represented Central State University (OK) (now University of Central Oklahoma) during the 1982 NAIA Division I football season, and completed the 77th season of Broncho football. The Bronchos played their five home games at Wantland Stadium in Edmond, Oklahoma, which has been Central's home stadium since 1965. The 1982 team came off a 6–3 record from the prior season. The 1982 team was headed by coach Gary Howard. The team finished the regular season with a 7–2 record and made the program's fourth appearance in the NAIA playoffs after a three-year absence. This time they won their second NAIA Football National Championship with a win over Mesa, 14–11.

== Schedule ==
Date	Opponent	Rank	Site	TV	Result
September 4	at Northwestern Oklahoma State		Ranger Field; Alva, OK		W 15–7
September 11	at Southwestern Oklahoma State		Milam Stadium; Weatherford, OK		L 7–12
September 18	at Henderson State		Ruggles Field; Arkadelphia, AR		W 24–3
September 25	Howard Payne		Wantland Stadium; Edmond, OK		W 42–7
October 2	at Northeastern State		Gable Field; Tahlequah, OK (rivalry)		L 26–42
October 9	East Central		Wantland Stadium; Edmond, OK		W 21–19
October 23	Eastern New Mexico		Wantland Stadium; Edmond, OK		W 49–12
October 30	Cameron		Wantland Stadium; Edmond, OK		W 38–6
November 6	at Langston		William E. Anderson Field; Langston, OK		W 52–6
December 4	at No. 5 Southern Colorado	No. 7	Pueblo, CO (NAIA Division I Quarterfinal)		W 61–20
December 11	at No. 2 Northeastern State	No. 7	Gable Field; Tahlequah, OK (NAIA Division I Semifinal)		W 28–17
December 18	No. 4 Mesa	No. 7	Wantland Stadium; Edmond, OK (NAIA Division I Championship)	USA	W 14–11
Rankings from Coaches' Poll released prior to the game

== After the season ==
The NAIA recognized wide receiver, Daric Zeno as a first team All-American. Quarterback Randy Page, was listed as a second team All-American.
