= 1934 Central State Teachers Bronchos football team =

American college football season

1934 Central State Teachers Bronchos football

OCC champion
- Conference: Oklahoma Collegiate Conference
- Record: 7–2 (5–0 OCC)
- Head coach: Claude Reeds (4th season)

1934 Oklahoma Collegiate Conference football standings
	Conf.					Overall
Team	W		L		T	W		L		T
Central State Teachers $	5	–	0	–	0	7	–	2	–	0
Northeastern State	3	–	2	–	0	4	–	5	–	0
Southwestern Oklahoma State	3	–	2	–	0	5	–	2	–	1
East Central	1	–	3	–	1	2	–	5	–	2
Southeastern Oklahoma State	1	–	3	–	1	2	–	6	–	1
Northwestern Oklahoma State	1	–	4	–	0	5	–	4	–	0
$ – Conference champion

The 1934 Central State Teachers Bronchos football team represented Central State Teachers College—now known as the University of Central Oklahoma—as a member of the Oklahoma Collegiate Conference during the 1934 college football season. In their fourth year under head coach Claude Reeds, the Bronchos compiled an overall record of 7–2 record with a mark of 5–0 in conference play, winning the OCC title.

== Schedule ==
Date	Time	Opponent	Site	Result	Attendance	Source
September 21	8:15 p.m.	at Tulsa*	Skelly Field; Tulsa, OK	L 0–26	9,000	
September 29		at Oklahoma City*	Goldbug Field; Oklahoma City, OK	W 6–0	4,000	
October 12		Northwestern Oklahoma State	Edmond, OK	W 7–0		
October 19	8:00 p.m.	at Southeastern Oklahoma State	Durant, OK	W 25–0		
October 27		West Texas State*^{†}	Edmond, OK	W 9–0		
November 3		at Southwestern Oklahoma State	Weatherford, OK	W 20–7		
November 9		Northeastern State	Edmond, OK	W 13–7		
November 24	2:30 p.m.	at Oklahoma Baptist*	Hurt Field; Shawnee, OK	L 0–7		
November 29		East Central	Edmond, OK	W 7–0		
*Non-conference game; ^{†}Homecoming; All times are in Central time
