= 1998 Central Oklahoma Bronchos football team =

College football season

1998 Central Oklahoma Bronchos football

LSC champion LSC North division champion

NCAA Division II Second Round, L* 21–24 ^{OT} vs. Texas A&M–Kingsville
- Conference: Lone Star Conference
- North Division
- Record: 12–1* (9–0 LSC)
- Head coach: Gary Howard (22nd season)
- Home stadium: Wantland Stadium

1998 Lone Star Conference football standings
	Conf.			Overall
Team	W		L	W		L
Overall*
No. 1 Central Oklahoma $^	9	–	0	12	–	1
No. 11 Texas A&M–Kingsville ^	8	–	1	11	–	3
No. 15 West Texas A&M	7	–	2	8	–	3
Northeastern State	6	–	2	8	–	2
Eastern New Mexico	6	–	3	8	–	3
Angelo State	6	–	3	6	–	4
Harding	5	–	3	7	–	4
SE Oklahoma State	4	–	4	5	–	5
Ouachita Baptist	3	–	5	3	–	7
Tarleton State	3	–	6	3	–	8
Abilene Christian	3	–	5	4	–	6
Texas A&M–Commerce	3	–	6	3	–	8
East Central	1	–	7	2	–	8
Midwestern State	1	–	8	2	–	9
SW Oklahoma State	0	–	9	0	–	10
North Division
No. 1 Central Oklahoma x$^	6	–	0	12	–	1
Northeastern State	5	–	1	8	–	2
Harding	4	–	2	7	–	4
SE Oklahoma State	3	–	3	5	–	5
Ouachita Baptist	2	–	4	3	–	7
East Central	1	–	5	2	–	8
SW Oklahoma State	0	–	6	0	–	10
South Division
No. 11 Texas A&M–Kingsville x^	7	–	0	11	–	3
No. 15 West Texas A&M	5	–	2	8	–	3
Eastern New Mexico	4	–	3	8	–	3
Angelo State	4	–	3	6	–	4
Tarleton State	3	–	4	3	–	8
Abilene Christian	2	–	5	4	–	6
Texas A&M–Commerce	2	–	5	3	–	8
Midwestern State	1	–	6	2	–	9
$ – Conference champion; ^ – NCAA Division II playoff participant; * – The LSC counted separate overall and division standings.; Rankings from NCAA Division II Football Committee poll

The 1998 Central Oklahoma Bronchos football team represented the University of Central Oklahoma during the 1998 NCAA Division II football season as members of the Lone Star Conference. This was the 93rd season of Broncho football. The Bronchos played their home games at Wantland Stadium in Edmond, Oklahoma, which has been Central's home stadium since 1965. The team was headed by coach Gary Howard in his 22nd season as head coach. The Bronchos finished the regular season with an undefeated 11–0 record and the Lone Star Conference Championship. The Bronchos also made the program's second appearance in the NCAA Division II playoffs. Entering the playoffs the Bronchos were the number one ranked team in the country. The Bronchos they won their first-round NCAA Division II playoff game over Chadron State, but lost their second-round game against Texas A&M–Kingsville. In 2000, the NCAA forced Texas A&M–Kingsville to forfeit their entire 1998 season due to use of ineligible players. As a result, the University of Central Oklahoma officially recognizes this season as an undefeated 13–0.

== Schedule ==
Date	Opponent	Rank	Site	Result	Source
September 5	at Northwestern Oklahoma State*	No. 13	Ranger Field; Alva, OK	W 3–0	
September 12	No. 6 Texas A&M–Kingsville	No. 13	Wantland Stadium; Edmond, OK	W 38–9	
September 19	Abilene Christian	No. 13	Wantland Stadium; Edmond, OK	W 30–0	
September 26	at Tarleton State	No. T–5	Memorial Stadium; Stephenville, TX	W 31–17	
October 3	Langston*	No. 3	Wantland Stadium; Edmond, OK	W 29–13	
October 10	East Central	No. 3	Wantland Stadium; Edmond, OK	W 14–13 ^{OT}	
October 17	at Harding	No. 2	Searcy, AR	W 31–3	
October 24	Ouachita Baptist	No. 2	Wantland Stadium; Edmond, OK	W 48–7	
October 31	at Southwestern Oklahoma State	No. 1	Milam Stadium; Weatherford, OK	W 20–6	
November 7	at Southeastern Oklahoma State	No. 1	Paul Laird Field; Durant, OK	W 48–7	
November 14	at Northeastern State	No. 1	Gable Field; Tahlequah, OK (rivalry)	W 36–10	
November 21	No. 19 Chadron State	No. 1	Wantland Stadium; Edmond, OK (NCAA Division II First Round)	W 21–19	
November 28	No. 11 Texas A&M–Kingsville	No. 1	Wantland Stadium; Edmond, OK (NCAA Division II Second Round)	L 21–24* ^{OT}	
*Non-conference game; Rankings from NCAA Division II Football Committee Poll released prior to the game

== Rankings ==
The Bronchos began the 1998 season ranked 13th in the Division II Committee poll. They rose to a tie for 5th by the end of the month. The Bronchos would rise to No. 2 by mid October. The Bronchos would gain the number one ranking after the Ouachita Baptist game and hold the top spot until the playoffs.

Ranking movements Legend: ██ Increase in ranking ██ Decrease in ranking ( ) = First-place votes
	Week								
Poll	Pre	1	2	3	4	5	6	7	Final
NCAA	13	5	3	3	2	2	1 (4)	1 (4)	1 (4)
