= 1961 Central State Bronchos football team =

American college football season

1961 Central State Bronchos football

OCC co-champion
- Conference: Oklahoma Collegiate Conference
- Record: 9–1 (6–1 OCC)
- Head coach: Al Blevins (4th season)
- Home stadium: Central Field

1961 Oklahoma Collegiate Conference football standings
	Conf.					Overall
Team	W		L		T	W		L		T
No. 9 Central State (OK) +	6	–	1	–	0	9	–	1	–	0
Langston +	6	–	1	–	0	8	–	2	–	0
No. 11 Panhandle A&M	4	–	1	–	0	9	–	2	–	0
East Central	3	–	4	–	0	5	–	5	–	0
SE Oklahoma State	2	–	4	–	0	4	–	6	–	0
Northeastern State	2	–	4	–	0	3	–	6	–	0
SW Oklahoma State	2	–	5	–	0	2	–	8	–	0
NW Oklahoma State	1	–	6	–	0	1	–	8	–	0
$ – Conference champion; Rankings from NAIA poll

The 1961 Central State Bronchos football team was an American football team that represented Central State College (now known as the University of Central Oklahoma) during the 1961 college football season. In their fourth year under head coach Al Blevins, the Bronchos compiled a 9–1 record (6–1 in conference games), won the OCC championship, and outscored opponents by a total of 252 to 90. Central State was ranked No. 9 in the final NAIA poll. The team played home games at Central Field in Edmond, Oklahoma.

== Schedule ==
Date	Opponent	Site	Result	Attendance	Source
September 15	at Eastern New Mexico*	Portales, NM	W 13–6		
September 23	at Langston	Guthrie, OK	W 14–13	6,000	
September 29	at Emporia State*	Emporia, KS	W 27–7		
October 7	Southwestern Oklahoma State	Edmond, OK	W 20–0	2,000	
October 14	at East Central	Norris Stadium; Ada, OK	W 19–18	5,000	
October 21	Northwestern Oklahoma State	Edmond, OK	W 12–7		
October 26	at Northeastern State	Tahlequah, OK	W 32–0		
November 4	Southeastern Oklahoma State^{†}	Edmond, OK	W 59–12	6,000	
November 10	Western State (CO)*	Edmond, OK	W 30–0	5,000	
November 17	Panhandle A&M	Broncho Stadium; Edmond, OK	L 26–27	8,000	
*Non-conference game; ^{†}Homecoming
