= Gene Smith (American football coach) =

American football and wrestling coach

Biographical details
- Born: c. 1910; Hillsboro, Texas, U.S.
- Died: April 6, 1987 (aged 76); Camarillo, California, U.S.

Playing career

Football
- 1930–1933: Central State (OK)

Coaching career (HC unless noted)

Football
- 1936–1942: Central State (OK) (assistant)
- 1946–1949: Central State (OK) (assistant)
- 1950–1951: Central State (OK)

Wrestling
- 1936–1939: Central State (OK)
- 1946–1947: Central State (OK)

Head coaching record
- Overall: 9–10 (football)

Accomplishments and honors

Championships
- Football; 1 OCAC (1950)

Deriot Eugene Smith (c. 1910 – April 6, 1987) was an American football and wrestling coach. He served as the head football coach at Central State College—now the University of Central Oklahoma—from 1950 and 1951, compiling a career college football record of 9–10, and one conference championship. He ranks 9th all-time for Broncho coaches in winning percentage, number of games coached and victories.

== Early life ==
Smith was born in Hillsboro, Texas, and attended Central State Teachers College in Edmond, Oklahoma, and graduated in 1934, with math and science degrees.

== Central State ==
Smith coached the Central State wrestling team from 1936 until 1939, and again in 1946–47 before the program's 25-year hiatus. He was an assistant coach for the CSC football team and filled in as head coach while Dale E. Hamilton served during the Korean War.

== Later life and death ==
Smith moved to California in 1958. He died at the age of 76, on April 6, 1987, in Camarillo, California.

== Head coaching record ==
=== Football ===
Year	Team	Overall	Conference	Standing
Central State Bronchos (Oklahoma Collegiate Conference) (1950–1951)
1950	Central State	7–3	4–1	T–1st
1951	Central State	2–7	2–3	4th
Central State Normal:		9–10	6–4	
Total:		9–10		
