= Central Oklahoma–Northeastern State football rivalry =

American college football rivalry

Central Oklahoma–Northeastern football rivalry
- Central Oklahoma Bronchos Northeastern State RiverHawks
- Sport: Football
- First meeting: 1912; Central State, 53–3
- Latest meeting: October 25, 2025; Northeastern State, 28–21
- Next meeting: TBD
- Trophy: President's Cup

Statistics
- Total meetings: 85
- All-time series: Central Oklahoma leads, 55–28–2
- Trophy series: Central Oklahoma leads, 17–10
- Largest victory: Central Oklahoma, 85–0 (1915)
- Longest win streak: Central Oklahoma, 10 (1912–1932, 2014–2024)
- Current win streak: Northeastern State, 1 (2025–present)

The Central Oklahoma–Northeastern State football rivalry, commonly referred to as the Battle for the President's Cup, is an American college football rivalry game played annually between the Central Oklahoma Bronchos football team of the University of Central Oklahoma from Edmond, Oklahoma, and the Northeastern State RiverHawks football team of Northeastern State University from Tahlequah, Oklahoma. Both schools currently compete in the NCAA Division II level, and are members of the Mid-America Intercollegiate Athletics Association (MIAA). Central Oklahoma, formerly Central State, has a 55–28–2 advantage in the series but Northeastern State has kept the series record close since the introduction of the President's Cup in 1998.

Prior to membership in the MIAA, both schools participated in the Oklahoma Collegiate Athletic Conference, the Oklahoma Intercollegiate Conference and most recently the Lone Star Conference, with Northeastern State joining the league in the mid-1990s.

Central Oklahoma has won the only postseason game between the schools, that being in the 1982 NAIA playoffs semifinal game. Between 1984 and 1996, the series went on hiatus over the amount of scholarships the schools offered their athletes.

Beginning in 1998 after Northeastern State upgraded to NCAA Division II, the Bronchos and the Redmen (now the RiverHawks), have played for the President's Cup. Central Oklahoma leads the trophy series with a 17–10 record in the President's Cup series. The schools also have an intense rivalry in basketball as well.

== Game results ==
Central Oklahoma victories	Northeastern State victories	Tie games

No.	Date	Location	Winner	Score
1	1912		Central State	53–3
2	1915		Central State	85–0
3	1916	Tahlequah, OK	Central State	53–0
4	1917		Central State	56–0
5	1926	Edmond, OK	Central State	7–0
6	1927		Central State	30–0
7	1929	Edmond, OK	Central State	6–0
8	1930	Edmond, OK	Central State	12–10
9	1931	Tahlequah, OK	Central State	25–0
10	1932	Edmond, OK	Central State	18–0
11	1933	Tahlequah, OK	Northeastern State	14–0
12	1934	Edmond, OK	Central State	13–7
13	1935	Tahlequah, OK	Northeastern State	12–2
14	1936	Edmond, OK	Central State	21–0
15	1937	Tahlequah, OK	Tie	0–0
16	1938	Edmond, OK	Central State	25–0
17	1939	Tahlequah, OK	Central State	13–6
18	1940	Edmond, OK	Central State	13–6
19	1941	Tahlequah, OK	Central State	7–6
20	1946	Tahlequah, OK	Central State	19–6
21	1947	Tahlequah, OK	Central State	27–21
22	1948	Edmond, OK	Central State	20–13
23	1949	Tahlequah, OK	Central State	26–0
24	1950	Edmond, OK	Central State	33–6
25	1951	Tahlequah, OK	Northeastern State	53–14
26	1952	Edmond, OK	Northeastern State	25–17
27	1953	Tahlequah, OK	Northeastern State	20–19
28	1954	Edmond, OK	Central State	42–0
29	1955	Tahlequah, OK	Central State	27–0
30	1956	Edmond, OK	Central State	13–7
31	1957	Tahlequah, OK	Northeastern State	28–12
32	1958	Edmond, OK	Northeastern State	28–8
33	1959	Tahlequah, OK	Central State	37–21
34	1960	Edmond, OK	Central State	21–14
35	1961	Tahlequah, OK	Central State	32–0
36	1962	Edmond, OK	Central State	38–0
37	1963	Tahlequah, OK	Northeastern State	14–7
38	1964	Edmond, OK	Northeastern State	14–0
39	1965	Tahlequah, OK	Tie	27–27
40	1966	Edmond, OK	Central State	54–13
41	1967	Tahlequah, OK	Central State	35–0
42	1968	Edmond, OK	Northeastern State	27–19
43	1969	Tahlequah, OK	Northeastern State	44–15

No.	Date	Location	Winner	Score
44	1970	Edmond, OK	Central State	41–7
45	1971	Tahlequah, OK	Central State	35–23
46	1972	Edmond, OK	Northeastern State	21–14
47	1973	Tahlequah, OK	Northeastern State	21–3
48	1974	Edmond, OK	Northeastern State	9–7
49	1975	Tahlequah, OK	Central State	34–24
50	1976	Edmond, OK	Northeastern State	14–6
51	1977	Tahlequah, OK	Central State	21–3
52	1978	Edmond, OK	Northeastern State	28–14
53	1979	Tahlequah, OK	Northeastern State	22–14
54	1982	Tahlequah, OK	Northeastern State	42–26
55	1982	Tahlequah, OK	Central State	21–3^{A}
56	1983	Edmond, OK	Central State	38–15
57	1984	Tahlequah, OK	Central State	31–24
58	1997	Edmond, OK	Central Oklahoma	17–16
59	1998	Tahlequah, OK	Central Oklahoma	36–10
60	1999	Edmond, OK	Northeastern State	12–7
61	2000	Tahlequah, OK	Northeastern State	7–0
62	2001	Edmond, OK	Northeastern State	45–44
63	2002	Tahlequah, OK	Central Oklahoma	58–48
64	2003	Edmond, OK	Central Oklahoma	63–42
65	2004	Tahlequah, OK	Central Oklahoma	25–7
66	2005	Edmond, OK	Central Oklahoma	37–10
67	2006	Tahlequah, OK	Northeastern State	26–23
68	2007	Edmond, OK	Northeastern State	22–14
69	2008	Tahlequah, OK	Central Oklahoma	24–13
70	2009	Edmond, OK	Central Oklahoma	47–38
71	2010	Tahlequah, OK	Northeastern State	39–28
72	2011	Edmond, OK	Northeastern State	35–7
73	2012	Edmond, OK	Northeastern State	22–20
74	2013	Tahlequah, OK	Northeastern State	45–38
75	2014	Edmond, OK	Central Oklahoma	28–10
76	2015	Tahlequah, OK	Central Oklahoma	48–17
77	2016	Edmond, OK	Central Oklahoma	17–14
78	2017	Tahlequah, OK	Central Oklahoma	62–21
79	2018	Tahlequah, OK	Central Oklahoma	62–0
80	2019	Edmond, OK	Central Oklahoma	82–14
81	2021	Tahlequah, OK	Central Oklahoma	49–9
82	2022	Edmond, OK	Central Oklahoma	55–6
83	2023	Tahlequah, OK	Central Oklahoma	37–21
84	2024	Tahlequah, OK	Central Oklahoma	64–57
85	2025	Edmond, OK	Northeastern State	28–21
Series: Central Oklahoma leads 55–28–2

^{A} During the 1982 college football season, the teams played twice; in this case, the second meeting was in the playoffs.

== See also ==
- List of NCAA college football rivalry games
