= Gary Howard (American football) =

American football player and coach (born 1942)

Biographical details
- Born: January 3, 1942 (age 84); Fort Smith, Arkansas, U.S.
- Education: University of Central Oklahoma (master's)

Playing career
- 1960–1963: Arkansas
- Positions: Offensive guard, linebacker

Coaching career (HC unless noted)
- 1964: Arkansas (OL)
- 1965–1966: Del City HS (OK) (assistant)
- 1967: Northeastern Oklahoma A&M (DL)
- 1968–1976: Central State (DC)
- 1977–2002: Central State / Central Oklahoma

Head coaching record
- Overall: 161–106–6
- Tournaments: 5–3 (NAIA D-I playoffs); 2–3 (NCAA D-II playoffs)

Accomplishments and honors

Championships
- 1 NAIA Division I National (1982); 2 LSC (1998–1999)

Awards
- NAIA National Coach of the Year (1982); 2× LSC North Coach of the Year (1997–1998)

Gary Howard (born January 3, 1942) is an American former football coach. He served as the head football coach at the University of Central Oklahoma—from 1977 to 2002, compiling a career college football record of 161–106–6, four NAIA playoff appearances, three NCAA Division II playoff appearances, two conference championships, and a national championship. He is winningest coach the history of the Central Oklahoma program.

== Early life ==
Howard was born in Fort Smith, Arkansas. He attended Tulsa Central High School in Tulsa, Oklahoma, where he played football, and basketball under Eddie Sutton. He attended the University of Arkansas and played offensive line and linebacker under Frank Broyles from 1960 to 1963.

== Early coaching ==
Howard began his coaching career in 1964 as the offensive line coach at Arkansas. During that season the team won a share of the National Championship. In 1965 and 1966 Howard was an assistant at Del City High School in Del City, Oklahoma. He was an assistant coach at Northeastern Oklahoma A&M College in Miami, Oklahoma. While at NEO the Norsemen won the 1967 NJCAA National Football Championship. Prior to the 1968 season, Howard accepted a position at Central State College in Edmond, Oklahoma.

== Central Oklahoma ==
=== NAIA era ===
Howard became the defensive coordinator at Central State College in 1968 under Phil Ball. In 1977 Howard succeeded Ball as the head coach. He oversaw the program's transition from a brief period in NCAA Division II back to NAIA competition, as an independent. During the first two seasons Howard's Bronchos went 12–8–1. In 1979, he led the Bronchos to the program's third NAIA playoff appearance and an 11–2 record. The Bronchos lost the NAIA National Championship Game to Texas A&I 20–14. Three years later he returned to the playoffs this time winning the NAIA National Championship over Mesa State 14–11. Howard also won the NAIA Coach of the Year award. The next season the Bronchos returned to the playoffs but lost to Saginaw Valley State in the first round. In 1985 the Bronchos lost in the first round to Henderson State in the institution's final NAIA playoff appearance.

=== NCAA Division II era ===
In 1988 the Bronchos re-joined the NCAA where the joined the Lone Star Conference. The Bronchos struggled for several seasons including a 0–10–1 record in 1989. In 1996 the renamed Central Oklahoma Bronchos posted a 9–3 record, finished second in the Lone Star Conference, and made the program's first appearance in the NCAA Division II playoffs. The first game against Chadron State ended in a Broncho victory. The Bronchos lost in the second round against UC Davis. The next season the Lone Star Conference underwent conference expansion, adding schools from Arkansas and Oklahoma, and split into two divisions. The first year of the new format the Bronchos captured the North Division title, and Howard won the North Division coach of the year award. In 1998 the Bronchos finished the regular season undefeated, and won their first Lone Star Conference Championship. However, in the NCAA playoffs the UCO lost in the second round to conference foe Texas A&M–Kingsville. In 2000 TAMU–K forfeited their entire 1998 season following NCAA infractions. In 1999 the Bronchos also won the Conference title. The final three years experienced a decline of a 5–5, 3–8, and 5–6 records. Howard was fired after the 2002 season. He finished with an overall record of 161–106–6.

== Personal life ==
Howard is married.

== Head coaching record ==
=== College football ===
Year	Team	Overall	Conference	Standing	Bowl/playoffs	AFCA^{#}
Central State Bronchos (NCAA Division II independent) (1977–1978)
1977	Central State	5–5–1				
1978	Central State	7–3				
Central State Bronchos (NAIA Division I independent) (1979–1987)
1979	Central State	11–2			L NAIA Division I Championship	
1980	Central State	5–4				
1981	Central State	7–2				
1982	Central State	10–2			W NAIA Division I Championship	
1983	Central State	8–1–1			L NAIA Division I First Round	
1984	Central State	7–3				
1985	Central State	7–2–1			L NAIA Division I First Round	
1986	Central State	3–5–1				
1987	Central State	2–8				
Central State / Central Oklahoma Bronchos (Lone Star Conference) (1988–2002)
1988	Central State	4–5	4–3	T–4th		
1989	Central State	0–10–1	0–7	8th		
1990	Central State	4–6	3–4	5th		
1991	Central Oklahoma	3–7	1–5	T–5th		
1992	Central Oklahoma	6–4	2–4	T–5th		
1993	Central Oklahoma	7–3	2–3	4th		
1994	Central Oklahoma	6–3–1	2–2–1	3rd		20
1995	Central Oklahoma	8–3	4–3	4th		
1996	Central Oklahoma	9–3	5–2	2nd	L NCAA Division II Second Round	9
1997	Central Oklahoma	9–2	7–2	3rd / 1st (North)		
1998	Central Oklahoma	12–1	9–0	1st / 1st (North)	L NCAA Division II Second Round	1
1999	Central Oklahoma	8–3	6–2	T–1st / T–2nd (North)	L NCAA Division II First Round	18
2000	Central Oklahoma	5–6	4–4	8th / 4th (North)		
2001	Central Oklahoma	3–8	1–7	12th / 6th (North)		
2002	Central Oklahoma	5–6	4–4	8th / 4th (North)		
Central Oklahoma:		161–106–6	55–51–1			
Total:		161–106–6				
National championship Conference title Conference division title or championship game berth
