= Ralph Myers (American football) =

American football coach

Coaching career (HC unless noted)
- 1920: Central State Teachers

Head coaching record
- Overall: 4–3–1

Ralph Myers was an American college football coach. He served as the head football coach at Central State Teachers College—now the University of Central Oklahoma—in 1920, compiling a record of 4–3–1. He ranks seventh all-time for Broncho coaches in winning percentage, and 12th in number of games coached and won.

== Head coaching record ==
=== Football ===
| Year | Team | Overall | Conference | Standing |
|---|---|---|---|---|
Central State Teachers (Oklahoma Intercollegiate Conference) (1920)
| 1920 | Central State Teachers | 4–3–1 | | |
| Central State Normal: | | 4–3–1 | | |
| Total: | | 4–3–1 | | |
