= Central Field (Central State) =

- Location: Edmond, Oklahoma
- Owner: University of Central Oklahoma
- Capacity: 2,700
- Surface: Grass

Construction
- Opened: September 22, 1928
- Closed: October 30, 1964

Tenant
- Central Oklahoma Bronchos

Central Field was the home of the Central State College Bronchos football team. The institution is now known as the University of Central Oklahoma. Central Field housed the Broncho football program from 1928-1964. Its first game was a victory over the Panhandle State Aggies 75-0. The original stadium didn't have stands until 1933, and permanent concrete stands built by the Works Project Administration until 1938. The stadium was host to the 1962 NAIA Football National Champion Bronchos. The stadium's last game was held on October 30, 1964 a 14-0 loss to Northeastern State University. Broncho Lake was constructed on the site of the Old Central Field. Beginning in 1965 Broncho football games would be played at Wantland Stadium.
