= 1962 Central State Bronchos football team =

American college football season

1962 Central State Bronchos football

NAIA national champion OCC champion

NAIA Football National Championship—Camellia Bowl, W 28–13 vs. Lenoir–Rhyne
- Conference: Oklahoma Collegiate Conference
- Record: 11–0 (7–0 OCC)
- Head coach: Al Blevins (5th season)
- Home stadium: Central Field

1962 Oklahoma Collegiate Conference football standings
	Conf.					Overall
Team	W		L		T	W		L		T
No. 1 Central State (OK) $^	7	–	0	–	0	11	–	0	–	0
East Central	6	–	1	–	0	9	–	3	–	0
SW Oklahoma State	5	–	2	–	0	6	–	4	–	0
Northeastern State	3	–	4	–	0	4	–	5	–	0
Panhandle A&M	2	–	4	–	1	3	–	6	–	1
SE Oklahoma State	1	–	4	–	2	3	–	5	–	2
Langston	1	–	5	–	1	1	–	6	–	1
NW Oklahoma State	1	–	6	–	0	2	–	7	–	0
$ – Conference champion; ^ – NAIA playoff participant; Rankings from NAIA poll

The 1962 Central State Bronchos football team represented Central State College—now known as the University of Central Oklahoma—during the 1962 NAIA football season. The team was led by head coach Al Blevins. They played their home games at Central Field in Edmond, Oklahoma. The Central squad finished the season with an undefeated record of 11–0, and won the NAIA Football National Championship over Lenoir–Rhyne in the Camellia Bowl.

== Schedule ==
Date	Opponent	Site	Result	Attendance	Source
September 14	Eastern New Mexico*	Central Field; Edmond, OK	W 25–6		
September 21	Langston	Central Field; Edmond, OK	W 14–13		
September 29	Emporia State*	Central Field; Edmond, OK	W 44–7		
October 6	at Southwestern Oklahoma State	Weatherford, OK	W 20–6		
October 13	East Central	Central Field; Edmond, OK	W 40–20		
October 20	at Northwestern Oklahoma State	Alva, OK	W 42–0	4,500	
October 27	Northeastern State	Central Field; Edmond, OK	W 38–0		
November 2	at Southeastern Oklahoma State	Paul Laird Field; Durant, OK	W 33–7		
November 17	at Panhandle A&M	Carl Wooten Field; Goodwell, OK	W 33–0		
November 24	vs. College of Emporia*	Taft Stadium; Oklahoma City, OK (NAIA Semifinal)	W 20–0		
December 8	vs. Lenoir–Rhyne*	Charles C. Hughes Stadium; Sacramento, CA (NAIA Championship Game—Camellia Bowl)	W 28–13		
*Non-conference game
