= Al Blevins =

American football coach

Biographical details
- Born: 1922
- Died: October 22, 1988 (aged 66)

Coaching career (HC unless noted)

Football
- ?: John Marshall HS (OK)
- ?: Edmond HS (OK)
- 1958–1963: Central State (OK)
- 1969–1972: Guthrie HS (OK)

Basketball
- 1957–1958: Central State (OK)

Head coaching record
- Overall: 82–46–6 (college football); 19–7 (college basketball)
- Tournaments: Football; 2–0 (NAIA playoffs)

Accomplishments and honors

Championships
- Football; 1 NAIA (1962); 2 OCC (1961–1962) Basketball; 1 OCC regular season (1958)

Alfred T. Blevins (1922 – October 22, 1988) was an American football coach. He served as the head football coach at Central State College—now the University of Central Oklahoma—from 1958 to 1963, compiling a career college football record of 82–46–6, and two conference championships, and a national championship. He ranks first all-time for Broncho coaches in winning percentage and sixth in number of games coached and victories.

== High school coaching ==
Blevins was the head coach at John Marshall High School in Oklahoma City, and Edmond High School in Edmond, Oklahoma.

== Central State ==
Blevins was hired as the head coach of Central State College Bronchos men's basketball team 1957 and held that post for one season. He coached the Central Oklahoma Bronchos football team from 1958 until 1963. During that span his teams went 82–46–6, winning two Oklahoma Collegiate Conference titles, in 1961 and 1962, and the NAIA Football National Championship in 1962.

== Later coaching ==
Blevins coached at Guthrie High School, in Guthrie, Oklahoma for four seasons. He coached the Oklahoma City Wranglers, and Oklahoma City Plainsmen.

== Personal life ==
Blevins was married to Mary, an English teacher and had two daughters and a son. Blevins was arrested on April 29, 1981, for reckless driving, and for possession of a controlled substance with intent to distribute. He was convicted of drug charges in 1982.

== Head coaching record ==
=== College football ===
Year	Team	Overall	Conference	Standing	Bowl/playoffs
Central State Bronchos (Oklahoma Collegiate Conference) (1958–1963)
1958	Central State	5–4	4–2	2nd	
1959	Central State	8–1	5–1	2nd	
1960	Central State	6–4	3–3	T–4th	
1961	Central State	9–1	6–1	T–1st	
1962	Central State	11–0	7–0	1st	W NAIA Championship (Camellia)
1963	Central State	4–4–1	3–3–1	4th	
Central State:		43–14–1	28–10–1		
Total:		43–14–1			
National championship Conference title Conference division title or championship game berth

=== College basketball ===
Record table
Season	Team	Overall	Conference	Standing	Postseason
Central State Bronchos (Oklahoma Collegiate Conference) (1957–1958)
1957–58	Central State	19–7			
Central State:		19–7 (.731)			
Total:		19–7 (.731)			
National champion Postseason invitational champion Conference regular season champion Conference regular season and conference tournament champion Division regular season champion Division regular season and conference tournament champion Conference tournament champion
