= Harlem, Illinois =

- Unincorporated community
- Location within Illinois Location within the United States
- Coordinates: 42°20′25″N 89°01′04″W
- Country: United States
- State: Illinois
- County: Winnebago
- Elevation: 755 ft (230 m)
- Time zone: UTC-6 (Central (CST))
  - Summer (DST): UTC-5 (CDT)
- ZIP: 61111
- Area codes: 815 & 779
- GNIS feature ID: 409785

Harlem is an unincorporated community in Winnebago County, in the U.S. state of Illinois. It was incorporated into Loves Park in the 1980s. Harlem is the closest city to Rock Cut State Park.

== History ==
A post office called Harlem was established in 1839, and remained in operation until it was discontinued in 1928. The community was named after Harlem, New York.

== Education ==
Residents of Harlem are served by the Harlem School District 122. Students attend Maple Elementary School Harlem Middle School, and Harlem High School.

== Culture ==
=== Places of Interest ===
Harlem Cemetery was built on a piece of land donated by one of the first citizens of the town, Asa Taylor, who is buried there.

== Transportation ==
RMTD provides bus service on Route 20 connecting Harlem to destinations throughout the Rockford area.
