= Dale E. Hamilton =

American athlete and coach (1909–2002)

Biographical details
- Born: March 4, 1909; Mena, Arkansas, U.S.
- Died: September 1, 2002 (aged 93)

Playing career

Basketball
- 1930–1933: Central State (OK)

Football
- 1928–1932: Central State (OK)
- Positions: Center, linebacker (football)

Coaching career (HC unless noted)

Football
- 1933: Cushing HS (OK)
- 1934: Bristow HS (OK) (assistant)
- 1936–1940: Central State (OK) (assistant)
- 1941–1942: Central State (OK)
- 1946–1949: Central State (OK)
- 1952–1957: Central State (OK)

Basketball
- 1934: Cushing HS (OK)
- 1935: Bristow HS (OK) (assistant)
- 1936: Ponca City HS (OK)
- 1937–1941: Central State (OK)

Administrative career (AD unless noted)
- 1941–1976: Central State (OK)

Head coaching record
- Overall: 73–25–3 (college football); 57–30 (college basketball)
- Tournaments: Basketball; 0–1 (NAIA)

Accomplishments and honors

Championships
- Football; 7 OCAC (1941–1942, 1948–1949, 1954–1956) Basketball; 2 OCAC (1938, 1939)

Dale Hamilton (March 4, 1909 – September 1, 2002) was an American athlete and coach. Hamilton served as a sports coach and athletic director, at Central State University in Edmond, Oklahoma.

== Early life and education ==
Hamilton was born in Mena, Arkansas. He was raised in Bristow, Oklahoma. He attended Bristow High School and graduated in 1928. He attended the Central State Teachers College (later, Central State University, now the University of Central Oklahoma, where Hamilton participated on the football, track, and basketball teams. In football, he played linebacker and center. While at Central State he earned twelve varsity letters.

== Coaching career ==
=== Pre-1940 ===
After graduation from CSTC in 1933, Hamilton coached at Cushing High School in 1933, he later coached at Bristow, and Ponca City before returning to Central State in 1936 under Claude Reeds. He then became head coach of the Broncho men's basketball team. He led the team to the 1939 NAIA Division I men's basketball tournament. In 1940 Reeds stepped down as both football coach and athletic director, Hamilton took his place in both roles.

=== Head football coach and two wars ===
Beginning in 1941, Hamilton, led the Bronchos to seven conference championships. In 1941 the Bronchos had a 6–2 record. The 1942 campaign saw many small schools suspend their football programs and the Bronchos won the OCAC with an undefeated 7–0 (2–0 conference) record. Hamilton then served during World War II. After the war, Hamilton did not resume his basketball coaching duties, but remained at the helm of the football program. He led the Bronchos to two more conference championships and a 24–9–2 four seasons before he took a leave of absence to serve again during the Korean War. After finishing his tour of duty, he resumed coaching duties and led the Bronchos to three more conference championships and a 36–16–1 record. In 1957, he decided to retire from football coaching with an overall record of 73–25–3.

=== Later coaching and administrative work ===
Hamilton remained athletic director until 1976, meanwhile he coached the men's golf and tennis teams. He also served as a referee for Missouri Valley Conference basketball games. In 1993 the University of Central Oklahoma decided to rename Hamilton Field House in his honor. He died on September 1, 2002, at the age of 93.

== Head coaching record ==
=== College football ===
Year	Team	Overall	Conference	Standing
Central State Bronchos (Oklahoma Collegiate Conference) (1941–1942)
1941	Central State	6–2	6–0	1st
1942	Central State	7–0	2–0	1st
Central State Bronchos (Oklahoma Collegiate Conference) (1946–1949)
1946	Central State	4–4–1	3–1–1	2nd
1947	Central State	7–1–1	3–1–1	2nd
1948	Central State	6–2	4–1	T–1st
1949	Central State	7–2	5–0	1st
Central State Bronchos (Oklahoma Collegiate Conference) (1952–1957)
1952	Central State	4–4	3–2	T–2nd
1953	Central State	6–3	3–2	3rd
1954	Central State	6–2–1	4–1	T–1st
1955	Central State	8–1	4–1	T–1st
1956	Central State	7–2	4–1	T–1st
1957	Central State	5–2	3–2	T–2nd
Central State:		73–25–3	39–12–2	
Total:		73–25–3		
National championship Conference title Conference division title or championship game berth

=== College basketball ===
Record table
Season	Team	Overall	Conference	Standing	Postseason
Central State Bronchos (Oklahoma Collegiate Athletic Conference) (1937–1941)
1937–38	Central State	17–6		1st	
1938–39	Central State	16–5		1st	L NAIA First Round
1939–40	Central State	10–12			
1940–41	Central State	14–7			
Central State:		57–30 (.655)			
Total:		57–30 (.655)			
National champion Postseason invitational champion Conference regular season champion Conference regular season and conference tournament champion Division regular season champion Division regular season and conference tournament champion Conference tournament champion
