= Nick Bobeck =

American football player and coach (born 1980)

Biographical details
- Born: June 7, 1980 (age 46); Beaver, Oklahoma, U.S.

Playing career
- 1999–2002: Central Oklahoma
- Position: Fullback

Coaching career (HC unless noted)
- 2003–2005: Central Oklahoma (GA)
- 2006: Texas A&M (OL)
- 2007: Navarro (OC)
- 2008–2011: Navarro
- 2012–2021: Central Oklahoma

Head coaching record
- Overall: 47–54 (college); 42–5 (junior college)
- Bowls: 3–1 (college); 2–0 (junior college)
- Tournaments: 1–0 (NJCAA playoffs)

Accomplishments and honors

Championships
- 1 NJCAA (2010); 2 SWJCFC (2010–2011)

Awards
- NJCAA Coach of the Year (2008)

Nick Bobeck (born June 7, 1980) is an American football coach, who formerly served as the head football coach at the University of Central Oklahoma, and Navarro College, a junior college in Texas. In 2008, Bobeck received the NJCAA Coach of the Year honors after leading the Bulldogs to a 10–1 record. Bobeck's team followed that up two years later with the 2010 NJCAA National Football Championship.

== Early life and education ==
Bobeck grew up in Beaver, Oklahoma. He attended Beaver High School and after graduating in 1999 was offered a football scholarship to the University of Central Oklahoma to play fullback. He wore number 45, since retired. Despite lettering all four years at Central Oklahoma, his first carry was in his second to last game, a 2-yard touchdown run against rival Northeastern State, en route to being named first team All-Lone Star Conference North Division in 2002.

Bobeck earned his bachelor's degree in education in 2003 and his master's degree in sports administration in 2005 from the University of Central Oklahoma.

== Coaching career ==
=== Early positions ===
After graduation from Central Oklahoma, Bobeck served as an assistant coach for three years under then-head coach Chuck Langston. He also coached at Texas A&M University in 2006 as the offensive line coach. In 2007, he took a position as the offensive coordinator at Navarro College.

=== Navarro ===
In 2008 Bobeck was promoted to head coach to replace Ray Woodard, who became the head coach at Lamar University. After the 2008 season, Bobeck was named the NJCAA National Football Coach of the Year. During his tenure at Navarro, Bobeck led the Bulldogs to a 42–5 record and the 2010 NJCAA National Championship. Bobeck was inducted to the Navarro College athletic hall of fame in 2021.

=== Central Oklahoma ===
On January 4, 2012, Bobeck was hired at his alma mater, Central Oklahoma, as the team's head coach. His first season at the helm was also the first season the Bronchos were a member of the Mid-America Intercollegiate Athletics Association. In the 2012 and 2013 seasons, the Bronchos played only a conference slate and finished with identical 2-8 records. In 2014, the Bronchos were picked 10th and 11th in the conference. However, the team played well above expectations and finished with an 8-4 record and an 8-3 conference record, earning the program's first bid to the Mineral Water Bowl. In 2015 the Bronchos participated in the Live United Texarkana Bowl winning over SWOSU. In 2017 and 2018 the Bronchos won bowl games over Tarleton State and Angelo State. The Bronchos couldn't reach that level of success again under Bobeck. After the 2021 season, Bobeck resigned.

== Personal life ==
Bobeck and his wife Keely, an assistant coach for the Central Oklahoma softball program, have a son and a daughter.

== Head coaching record ==
=== College ===
Year	Team	Overall	Conference	Standing	Bowl/playoffs
Central Oklahoma Bronchos (Mid-America Intercollegiate Athletics Association) (2012–2021)
2012	Central Oklahoma	2–8	2–8	T–13th	
2013	Central Oklahoma	2–8	2–8	T–11th	
2014	Central Oklahoma	8–4	8–3	3rd	L Mineral Water
2015	Central Oklahoma	7–5	6–5	T–5th	W Texarkana
2016	Central Oklahoma	3–8	3–8	T–8th	
2017	Central Oklahoma	8–4	7–4	T–4th	W Corsicana
2018	Central Oklahoma	8–4	7–4	T–4th	W C.H.A.M.P.S. Heart of Texas
2019	Central Oklahoma	5–6	5–6	8th	
2020–21	No team—COVID-19				
2021	Central Oklahoma	4–7	4–7	T–8th	
Central Oklahoma:		47–54	44–53		
Total:		47–54			

=== Junior college ===
Year	Team	Overall	Conference	Standing	Bowl/playoffs
Navarro Bulldogs (Southwest Junior College Football Conference) (2008–2011)
2008	Navarro	10–1	7–0	1st	L SWJCFC Championship
2009	Navarro	11–1	7–0	1st	L SWJCFC Championship, W C.H.A.M.P.S. Heart of Texas Bowl
2010	Navarro	11–1	7–0	1st	W SWJCFC Championship, W Citizens Bank Bowl
2011	Navarro	10–2	6–1	1st	W SWJCFC Championship, W C.H.A.M.P.S. Heart of Texas Bowl
Navarro:		42–5	27–1		
Total:		42–5			
National championship Conference title Conference division title or championship game berth
