= Boyd Hill =

American football and basketball coach

Biographical details
- Born: September 16, 1878; Harlem, Illinois, U.S.
- Died: December 31, 1908 (aged 30); Stillwater, Oklahoma, U.S.

Coaching career (HC unless noted)

Football
- 1904: Central State Normal
- 1905: Haskell
- 1906–1907: Oklahoma A&M

Basketball
- 1907–1908: Oklahoma A&M

Head coaching record
- Overall: 9–16–4 (football); 2–3 (basketball)

Boyd Almon Hill (September 16, 1878 – December 31, 1908) was an American college football and basketball coach. He served as head football coach at Central State Normal School (now the University of Central Oklahoma) in 1904, Haskell Institute (now Haskell Indian Nations University) in 1905, and Oklahoma Agricultural and Mechanical College (now Oklahoma State University–Stillwater) from 1906 to 1907, compiling a career college football coaching record of 9–16–4. Hill was also the head basketball coach at Oklahoma A&M for one season in 1907–08, tallying a mark of 2–3.

Hill was born on September 16, 1878, in Harlem, Illinois, and graduated from high school in Belvidere, Illinois. He entered the United States Military Academy in 1899, but withdrew in 1902 due to illness. Hill moved to Beaver County, Oklahoma in 1903, then to Edmond, Oklahoma, where he graduated from Central State Normal School in 1905. He died of meningitis on December 31, 1908, at his home in Stillwater, Oklahoma.

== Head coaching record ==
=== Football ===
Year	Team	Overall	Bowl/playoffs
Central State Normal (Independent) (1904)
1904	Central State Normal	2–3	
Central State Normal:		2–3	
Haskell Indians (Independent) (1905)
1905	Haskell	5–4–1	
Haskell:		5–4–1	
Oklahoma A&M Aggies (Independent) (1906–1907)
1906	Oklahoma A&M	1–4–2	
1907	Oklahoma A&M	1–5–2	
Oklahoma A&M:		2–9–4	
Total:		9–16–5	
