= Fenis Bently =

American football coach

Coaching career (HC unless noted)
- 1905–1911: Central State Normal

Head coaching record
- Overall: 22–38–5

Fenis Bently was an American college football coach. He served as the head football coach at Central State Normal School—now known as the University of Central Oklahoma—from 1905 to 1911, compiling a record of 22–38–5.

== Head coaching record ==
Year	Team	Overall	Bowl/playoffs
Central State Normal (Independent) (1905–1911)
1905	Central State Normal	4–3–2	
1906	Central State Normal	6–3	
1907	Central State Normal	2–5–1	
1908	Central State Normal	4–4–2	
1909	Central State Normal	2–11	
1910	Central State Normal	0–9	
1911	Central State Normal	4–3–1	
Central State Normal:		22–38–5	
Total:		22–38–5	
