= Claude Reeds =

American football player and coach (1890–1974)

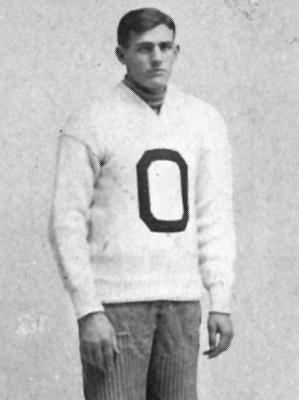

Biographical details
- Born: November 12, 1890; Norman, Oklahoma, U.S.
- Died: April 30, 1974 (aged 83); McClain County, Oklahoma, U.S.

Playing career

Football
- 1910–1913: Oklahoma

Basketball
- 1910–1914: Oklahoma

Baseball
- 1912–1914: Oklahoma

Track and field
- 1910, 1912–1913: Oklahoma
- Position: Fullback

Coaching career (HC unless noted)

Football
- 1914–1915: Southwestern Normal (OK)
- 1916–1917: Colorado Agricultural (assistant)
- 1924–1928: Oklahoma (line)
- 1929–1930: West Texas State Teachers
- 1931–1940: Central State Teachers / Central State (OK)

Basketball
- 1935–1937: Central State Teachers

Baseball
- 1915–1917: Colorado Agricultural

Head coaching record
- Overall: 72–41–11 (football); 27–16 (basketball); 5–9 (baseball)

Accomplishments and honors

Championships
- Football; 8 OCC (1931–1932, 1934–1939)
- College Football Hall of Fame; Inducted in 1961 (profile)

Claude Edwin Reeds (November 12, 1890 – April 30, 1974) was an American football player and coach. He played college football at the University of Oklahoma as a fullback from 1910 to 1913. He also was a letterwinner on Oklahoma's track, baseball, and basketball teams. Reeds served as the head football coach at Southwestern Normal School—now Southwestern Oklahoma State University—from 1914 to 1915, at West Texas State Teachers College—now West Texas A&M University—from 1929 to 1930, and at Central State Teachers College—now the University of Central Oklahoma—from 1931 to 1940, compiling a career coaching record of 72–41–11. He was inducted into the College Football Hall of Fame as a player in 1961.

== Head coaching record ==
=== Football ===
Year	Team	Overall	Conference	Standing
Southwestern Normal Bulldogs (Oklahoma Intercollegiate Conference) (1914–1915)
1914	Southwestern Normal	0–2		
1915	Southwestern Normal	3–5–1		
Southwestern Normal:		3–7–1		
West Texas State Buffaloes (Texas Intercollegiate Athletic Association) (1929–1930)
1929	West Texas State	6–3–1	2–2	6th
1930	West Texas State	6–3–1	4–0–1	2nd
West Texas State:		12–6–2	6–2–1	
Central State Teachers / Central State Bronchos (Oklahoma Collegiate Conference) (1931–1940)
1931	Central State Teachers	6–2–1	4–0–1	1st
1932	Central State Teachers	6–3–1	4–1	T–1st
1933	Central State Teachers	4–5–1	2–2–1	4th
1934	Central State Teachers	7–2	5–0	1st
1935	Central State Teachers	7–2–1	4–1	T–1st
1936	Central State Teachers	8–1	6–0	1st
1937	Central State Teachers	6–2–2	5–0–1	1st
1938	Central State Teachers	6–3	6–0	1st
1939	Central State	5–3	5–1	1st
1940	Central State	2–5–2	2–2–2	5th
Central State Teachers / Central State:		57–28–8	43–7–5	
Total:		72–41–11		
National championship Conference title Conference division title or championship game berth

=== Basketball ===
Record table
Season	Team	Overall	Conference	Standing	Postseason
Central State Teachers Bronchos (Oklahoma Collegiate Conference) (1935–1937)
1935–36	Central State Teachers	11–9			
1936–37	Central State Teachers	16–7			
Central State Teachers:		27–16 (.628)			
Total:		27–16 (.628)			
National champion Postseason invitational champion Conference regular season champion Conference regular season and conference tournament champion Division regular season champion Division regular season and conference tournament champion Conference tournament champion

=== College baseball ===
Record table
Season	Team	Overall	Conference	Standing	Postseason
Colorado Agricultural Aggies () (1915–1917)
1915	Colorado Agricultural	3–4			
1916	Colorado Agricultural	1–3			
1917	Colorado Agricultural	1–2			
Cultural Agricultural:		5–9 (.357)			
Total:		5–9 (.357)			
National champion Postseason invitational champion Conference regular season champion Conference regular season and conference tournament champion Division regular season champion Division regular season and conference tournament champion Conference tournament champion
