= Phil Ball (American football) =

American football player and coach (1925–2008)

Biographical details
- Born: October 19, 1925
- Died: November 16, 2008 (aged 83); Edmond, Oklahoma, U.S.
- Education: University of South Carolina (B.S. B.A. M.ED.); Oklahoma State University (Ph.D.)

Playing career
- 1944–1947: South Carolina
- Position: Guard

Coaching career (HC unless noted)
- 1964–1976: Central State (OK)

Head coaching record
- Overall: 83–45–6
- Tournaments: 0–1

Accomplishments and honors

Championships
- 1 OCC (1972)

Awards
- First-team All-SoCon (1945)

Phillip Roy Ball (October 19, 1925 – November 16, 2008) was an American football player and coach. He served as the head football coach at Central State College (and University)—now the University of Central Oklahoma—from 1964 to 1976, compiling a career college football record of 83–45–6, and one conference championship. He ranks 4th all-time for Broncho coaches in winning percentage, and 3rd number of games coached and victories.

== Early life and education ==
Ball grew up in Yukon, Oklahoma, and graduated from Yukon High School in 1943. After high school Ball joined the United States Navy and enrolled in the University of South Carolina. While at South Carolina he was a guard on the football team. After graduating from South Carolina, Ball began coaching at several Oklahoma high schools including: Wewoka Walters, Seminole, and Muskogee.

== Central State ==
Ball was hired as the head coach of Central State University in 1964 and coached the Central State Bronchos until 1976. During that span his teams went 83–45–6, including one conference championship, and one NAIA playoff appearance. Also at CSU he was known for compiling his own stats.

== After coaching ==
Ball earned a Ph.D. from Oklahoma State University. He remained on the faculty at Central State/Central Oklahoma until his retirement in 1993. He died on November 16, 2008.

== Head coaching record ==
=== College ===
Year	Team	Overall	Conference	Standing	Bowl/playoffs
Central State Bronchos (Oklahoma Collegiate Conference) (1964–1973)
1964	Central State	4–5	2–5	6th	
1965	Central State	6–3–1	5–1–1	T–2nd	
1966	Central State	7–2	5–2	T–2nd	
1967	Central State	4–5–1	2–4–1	6th	
1968	Central State	6–4–1	3–3–1	5th	
1969	Central State	8–1–1	5–1–1	3rd	
1970	Central State	9–2	6–2	T–3rd	
1971	Central State	7–2–1	5–2–1	T–2nd	
1972	Central State	9–2	7–1	1st	L NAIA Division I Semifinal
1973	Central State	6–4–1	5–3	T–3rd	
Central State Bronchos (Oklahoma Intercollegiate Conference) (1974–1975)
1974	Central State	5–5	2–3	T–4th	
1975	Central State	7–4	4–1	2nd	
Central State Bronchos (NCAA Division II independent) (1976)
1976	Central State	5–6			
Central State:		83–45–6	51–28–5		
Total:		83–45–6			
National championship Conference title Conference division title or championship game berth
