= Central Oklahoma Bronchos football =

College football team (University of Central Oklahoma)

- First season: 1902; 124 years ago
- Athletic director: Stan Wagnon
- Head coach: Cody Swanson (interim); 1st season, 0–0 (–)
- Location: Edmond, Oklahoma
- Stadium: Chad Richison Stadium (capacity: 12,000)
- NCAA division: Division II
- Conference: The MIAA
- Colors: Blue and bronze
- All-time record: 655–437–47 (.596)
- Bowl record: 3–1 (.750)

NAIA national championships
- NAIA: 1962 NAIA Division I: 1982

Conference championships
- 28

Division championships
- 5
- Rivalries: Northeastern State (rivalry)
- Fight song: UCO Fight Song
- Mascot: Buddy Broncho
- Marching band: UCO Stampede of Sound
- Outfitter: Nike
- Website: bronchosports.com

The Central Oklahoma Bronchos football team represents the University of Central Oklahoma (UCO) in college football. The team is a member of the Mid-America Intercollegiate Athletics Association (MIAA), which is in Division II of the National Collegiate Athletic Association (NCAA). The Bronchos (pronounced Broncos) football program began in 1902 and has since compiled over 600 wins, two national championships, and 28 conference championships. As of 2026, the Bronchos are ranked fifth in NCAA Division II for wins. In 1962, the Bronchos went 11–0 on the season and defeated Lenoir–Rhyne University (NC) 28–13 in the Camellia Bowl to claim its first NAIA national championship. Twenty years later, Central Oklahoma defended its home turf and defeated Colorado Mesa University (then Mesa State College) 14–11 in the NAIA national championship game to take its second title and finish the season with a 10–2 record. Despite its rich history in football, Central Oklahoma has struggled beginning in the late 2000s. In 2024, the program broke on a 21 year playoff drought. The Bronchos play their home games at Chad Richison Stadium, a 12,000-seat football stadium built in 1965, and remodeled in 2022. The Bronchos have enjoyed nine undefeated home seasons and are 6–1 in playoff games at Chad Richison Stadium.

== History ==
=== Early history (1902–1911) ===
Five years before Oklahoma became a state, in 1902, UCO, played its first game of football. They were shutout in that season's lone contest. In the match, the Oklahoma A&M Aggies defeated coach-less Central by a score of 40–0. The Bronchos did not field a team in 1903, but they resumed play the following year in 1904 after securing their first head coach, Boyd Hill. Hill stepped down after posting a 2–3 record his first season, and he later went on to coach at Haskell and Oklahoma A&M. In 1905, Coach Fenis Bently took the reins of the young football program and compiled a record of 22–38–5 over the span of seven seasons, with over a third of those losses coming against Oklahoma and Oklahoma A&M.

=== Wantland era (1912–1930) ===
After ten years of inconsistent play, the school, then known as Central State, landed coach Charles W. Wantland. Wantland took over as the head coach in 1912, and guided the program to 102 victories, six conference championships, and Central State's first undefeated season in 1915, during his 18 years at the helm. Central State's first conference championship came in 1914, when they posted a 7–1–1 record. In 1922, Wantland's wife suggested the term Bronchos for the school's athletic programs. That same year, the Bronchos defeated Iowa State. The third Oklahoma Intercollegiate Conference championship came in 1923. The Bronchos were impressive that season, beating its opponents by a combined score of 184–25, including a 14–6 victory over Oklahoma A&M in Stillwater. Wantland's teams continued their success by winning their fifth conference championship the following season in which Central defeated the likes of Oklahoma, eventual Southwest Conference champions Baylor, and Tulsa, all on the road. 1924 was the year of the program's sole victory over the Oklahoma Sooners. This is notable because the coaches for both schools, Charles W. Wantland and Bennie Owen, were later immortalized for their accomplishments in a nearly identical fashion: CSC named its stadium after Wantland, and OU named its playing field after Owen. In addition to the stadium, Central State memorialized Coach Wantland by naming the physical education building in his honor. Wantland guided the Bronchos to one more conference championship in 1929 and finished the following year with a final record of 102–42–16 (.688).

=== Reeds era (1931–1940) ===
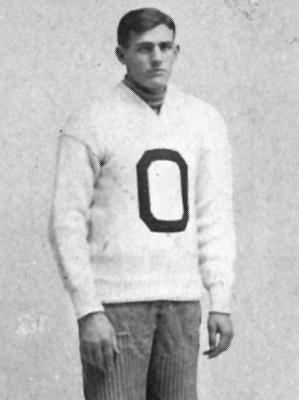
Claude Reeds served as Central State's head coach from 1931–1940

Claude Reeds, a former Oklahoma All-American fullback, left West Texas State and took over the CSTC program in 1931. He picked up right where Wantland left off by winning eight Oklahoma Collegiate Conference championships in his ten years in charge. In 1940, Reeds ended his tenure at Central State with a record of 57–28–8 (.656).

=== Hamilton era (1941–1957) ===
After Reeds' departure, Central State hired Dale E. Hamilton to lead the Bronchos. In 1942, the Bronchos completed their second undefeated season with a 7–0 record. Due to World War II the Bronchos did not play again until the 1946 season. During this time Hamilton spent two tours of duty in the armed forces, and Gene Smith filled in during the Korean War in 1950 and 1951, winning an OCC title. Hamilton posted a 73–25–3 (.738) record and won eight conference championships in his 12-years as coach. After coaching, Hamilton served as the institution's athletic director. The university's Hamilton Field House is named in his honor.

=== Blevins era (1958–1963) ===
Following Hamilton's tough act, Coach Al Blevins managed to take the program to new heights. The Bronchos had three players, Ray Hayes, Bob Sams, and Jerry Perry drafted in the 1961 NFL draft. In 1961, Central State finished 9–1 and won its 20th conference championship. Their only blemish was a loss in the season finale to Panhandle A&M. CSC completed the season ranked ninth in the final NAIA poll. In 1962, Central State went a perfect 11–0, finished third in the final small college AP poll and defeated Lenoir–Rhyne 28–13 in the Camellia Bowl, en route to the programs first NAIA national championship. Blevins left CSC after the 1963 season, and later coached minor league football in Oklahoma City. Blevins finished his Broncho tenure with a 43–14–1 record.

=== Ball era (1964–1976) ===
In 1964, Phil Ball replaced Blevins as the Bronchos head coach. After a few rough seasons, including a 3–6–1 record in 1967 the Bronchos rebounded over the next few seasons and won the OCC championship in 1972, and made the NAIA playoffs. The Bronchos left the reconstituted Oklahoma Intercollegiate Conference in 1976 and made a transition to the NCAA Division II level. He finished with an overall record of 82–42–6.

=== Howard era (1977–2002) ===
In 1977, Gary Howard succeeded Phil Ball as the head coach. He oversaw the program's transition from a brief period in NCAA Division II back to NAIA competition, as an independent. During the first two seasons Howard's Bronchos went 12–8–1. In 1979, he led CSU to the program's third NAIA playoff appearance and an 11–2 record. The Bronchos lost the NAIA National Championship Game to Texas A&I 20–14. Three years later he returned to the playoffs this time winning the NAIA National Championship over Mesa State (now Colorado Mesa) 14–11. Howard also won the NAIA Coach of the Year award. The following season the Bronchos returned to the playoffs but lost to Saginaw Valley State in the first round. In 1985, the Bronchos lost in the first round to Henderson State in the institution's final NAIA playoff appearance.

In 1988, the Bronchos re-joined the NCAA where they joined the Lone Star Conference. The Bronchos struggled for several seasons including a 0–10–1 record in 1989. The institution was renamed to the University of Central Oklahoma in 1991. In 1996, Central Oklahoma posted a 9–3 record, finished second in the Lone Star Conference, and made the program's first appearance in the NCAA Division II playoffs. The first game against Chadron State ended in a Broncho victory. UCO lost in the second round against UC Davis. The next season the Lone Star Conference underwent conference expansion, adding schools from Arkansas and Oklahoma, including many former OIC schools, and split into two divisions. The first year of the new format the Bronchos captured the North Division title, and Howard won the North Division coach of the year award. In 1998 the Bronchos finished the regular season undefeated, won their first Lone Star Conference Championship, and was the number one ranked team going into the playoffs. However, in the NCAA playoffs UCO lost in the second round to conference foe Texas A&M–Kingsville. In 2000, Texas A&M–Kingsville forfeited their entire 1998 season following NCAA infractions. In 1999, the Bronchos also won the conference title. The final three years experienced a decline with 5–5, 3–8, and 5–6 records. Howard was fired after the 2002 season. He finished with an overall record of 161–106–6.

=== Langston and Holland eras (2003–2011) ===
In 2003, UCO hired former Oklahoma Sooners center Chuck Langston as the head coach. In his first year, the Bronchos finished 9–3, and made another playoff appearance. The Bronchos defeated Mesa State 20–15, but lost to Texas A&M–Kingsville the following week. However, Langston's time at UCO would be marred with NCAA violations, including paying for a recruits surgery, and funding a player's remedial classes at Rose State. From 2003 to 2007 Langston had a record of 29–24 (.547) as the Bronchos' coach. UCO fired Langston as a result of the rules violations.

In 2008, the Bronchos hired Tracy Holland as their head coach. In his first year as head coach the Bronchos had a 7–4 record and won the LSCs South Division Championship. However, the program's record declined every year under Holland. The decline in performance coincided with the NCAA's decision to place the Bronchos on three years probation for "lack of institutional control," starting in 2008 from the infractions that occurred under Langston. As a result of penalties, UCO's roster was reduced from 100 players to 90 players each season during the probation. After the 2010 season, UCO left the Lone Star Conference in anticipation to move to the Mid-America Intercollegiate Athletics Association. In December 2011, Holland was fired as head coach after compiling a 15–29 record during his four seasons at the helm.

=== Bobeck era (2012–2021) ===
With the Bronchos off probation from the NCAA, Navarro Junior College coach, and former UCO fullback Nick Bobeck, took over as head coach in 2012. The Bronchos began play in the Mid-America Intercollegiate Athletics Association. That season's campaign began with three straight losses before an upset win over top-ten ranked Washburn. The Bronchos finished with a 2–8 record. The following season the Bronchos began 0–7 before winning two straight. However, they lost to Northeastern State in the President's Cup game to finish with their second straight 2–8 record. In the first game of the 2014 season, the Bronchos won their 600th game. At the time this placed UCO as the fourth highest win total in Division II history. During that season the Bronchos were as high as 22nd in the D2football.com rankings before finishing third in the MIAA with an 8–3 record and a Mineral Water Bowl appearance. In 2015, the Bronchos, began slowly with an 0–4 record, but won seven out of their final eight games to finish with a 7–5 record and a victory over in-state rival Southwestern Oklahoma State in the Live United Texarkana Bowl. In 2016 UCO finished with a 3–8 record. In 2017, the Bronchos began the season 2–4 with all four losses by seven points or less. UCO finished the regular season with five straight victories and a 7–4 record, and a tie for fourth in the MIAA. The Bronchos went on to win the inaugural Corsicana Bowl over Tarleton State 38–31. The following season the Bronchos finished 8–4 after defeating Angelo State in the C.H.A.M.P.S. Heart of Texas Bowl. The Bronchos abstained from the 2020 season due to the coronavirus pandemic. They played an exhibition game in the spring of 2021. After the 2021 season Bobeck resigned as head coach with a 47–54 (.465) record.

=== Dorrel era (2022–2026) ===
A Bronchos defender (right) pursues a Central Missouri quarterback during a game in 2026

In December 2021, UCO hired former Northwest Missouri State and Abilene Christian head coach Adam Dorrel to the same position. Dorrel had previously won three NCAA Division II championships as the head coach of the Bearcats. In 2022, the Bronchos finished the season with a 6–5 record. In 2024, Dorrel led the Bronchos to their first playoff appearance since 2003 and their first MIAA championship. In the middle of the 2026 season, Dorrel resigned as head coach with a 28-18 (.609) record.

== Current coaching staff ==
Name	Position	Seasons at Central Oklahoma	Alma Mater
Cody Swanson	Interim Head coach	3	Emporia State
Patrick Bringingstool	Offensive Coordinator	4	Emporia State
Cody Swanson	Defensive Coordinator	3	Emporia State
Rick Roberts	Tight ends	4	California Lutheran
Jesse Harwell	Safeties/Special teams	3	Southeastern Oklahoma State
Devin Johnston	Cornerbacks	2	Ottawa (KS)
Hayden Ekern	Wide receivers	2	Minnesota State
Kam Langford	Linebackers	1	Missouri Western
Casey Kline	Running backs	3	Central Oklahoma

== Head coaches ==
The team has had 15 head coaches since organized football began in 1902. The Bronchos have played in more than 1,000 games in its 116 seasons. The current head coach is Cody Swanson (as interim). In those seasons, four coaches have led the Bronchos to postseason playoff appearances: Al Blevins, Phil Ball, Gary Howard, and Chuck Langston. Nick Bobeck has led the Bronchos to three Division II bowl games. Eight coaches have won conference championships with the Bronchos: Charles W. Wantland, Claude Reeds, Dale E. Hamilton, Gene Smith, Blevins, Ball, Howard, and Adam Dorrel. Blevins, and Howard have also won national championships with the Bronchos. Howard is the all-time leader in games coached and years coached, while Blevins is the all-time leader in wins and winning percentage. Tracy Holland is by December 2022, in terms of winning percentage, the least successful coach the Bronchos have had as head coach.

== Conferences ==
From its inaugural season in 1902 until 1913, the program played as an independent. In 1914, Central State joined the Oklahoma Intercollegiate Conference. The league reorganized twice, first as the Oklahoma Collegiate Conference in 1929, in which the school won 22 conference championships, and in 1974 as the Oklahoma Intercollegiate Conference. The Bronchos played in the second OIC for two seasons before leaving to play as an NCAA Division II independent in 1976. CSU returned to the NAIA in 1979. In 1988, the Bronchos returned to NCAA Division II play and joined the Lone Star Conference in which it won two conference championships. Central Oklahoma left the Lone Star Conference after the 2010 season, played as an independent for one season and joined the MIAA later joined the MIAA in 2012.

== Championships ==
- The following is a list of Central Oklahoma's 2 national championships.

=== National championship seasons ===
Season	Coach	Selectors	Record	Bowl
1962	Al Blevins	NAIA Playoffs	11–0	Won Camellia Bowl
1982	Gary Howard	NAIA Playoffs	10–2	Won NAIA Championship
National championships			2	

=== Conference championship seasons ===
- The following is a list of Central Oklahoma's 28 conference championships.

Year	Conference	Coach	Overall record	Conference record
1914	Oklahoma Intercollegiate Conference	Charles W. Wantland	5–1	–
1915	Oklahoma Intercollegiate Conference	Charles W. Wantland	9–0	–
1921	Oklahoma Intercollegiate Conference	Charles W. Wantland	8–1	–
1923	Oklahoma Intercollegiate Conference	Charles W. Wantland	7–1–1	–
1924	Oklahoma Intercollegiate Conference	Charles W. Wantland	9–1	7–0
1929	Oklahoma Collegiate Conference	Charles W. Wantland	6–1–2	6–0
1931	Oklahoma Collegiate Conference	Claude Reeds	6–2–1	4–0–1
1932†	Oklahoma Collegiate Conference	Claude Reeds	6–3–1	5–1
1934	Oklahoma Collegiate Conference	Claude Reeds	7–2	5–0
1935†	Oklahoma Collegiate Conference	Claude Reeds	7–2–1	4–1
1936	Oklahoma Collegiate Conference	Claude Reeds	8–1	5–0
1937	Oklahoma Collegiate Conference	Claude Reeds	6–2–2	4–0–1
1938	Oklahoma Collegiate Conference	Claude Reeds	6–3	5–0
1939	Oklahoma Collegiate Conference	Claude Reeds	5–3	5–0–1
1941	Oklahoma Collegiate Conference	Dale E. Hamilton	6–2	6–0
1942	Oklahoma Collegiate Conference	Dale E. Hamilton	7–0	2–0
1948†	Oklahoma Collegiate Conference	Dale E. Hamilton	6–2	4–1
1949	Oklahoma Collegiate Conference	Dale E. Hamilton	7–2	5–0
1950†	Oklahoma Collegiate Conference	Gene Smith	7–3	4–1
1954†	Oklahoma Collegiate Conference	Dale E. Hamilton	6–2–1	4–1
1955†	Oklahoma Collegiate Conference	Dale E. Hamilton	8–1	4–1
1956†	Oklahoma Collegiate Conference	Dale E. Hamilton	7–2	4–1
1961	Oklahoma Collegiate Conference	Al Blevins	9–1	6–0
1962	Oklahoma Collegiate Conference	Al Blevins	11–0	6–0
1972	Oklahoma Collegiate Conference	Phil Ball	9–2	7–1
1998	Lone Star Conference	Gary Howard	12–1	9–0
1999†	Lone Star Conference	Gary Howard	8–3	6–2
2024	Mid-America Intercollegiate Athletics Association	Adam Dorrel	10–1	8–1
Total conference championships:			28 (5 OIC, 20 OCC, 2 LSC, 1 MIAA)	
† Denotes co-champions

=== Divisional championships ===
The Lone Star Conference was split into two divisions from the 1997 to the 2010 season with Central Oklahoma competing in the LSC North. Central Oklahoma has won or shared 5 divisional titles. Their last division title was in the 2008 season. The conference and division championships were separate rankings.

Season	Division	LSC champion	Division wins	Division losses
1997†	LSC North	No	5	1
1998	LSC North	Yes	7	0
2004†	LSC North	No	4	1
2007†	LSC North	No	3	2
2008	LSC North	No	5	0
Division championships			5	
† Denotes co-champions

== Stadium ==
The Bronchos have played their home football games at Chad Richison Stadium, located on the north side of the UCO campus, since 1965. The stadium was originally named Wantland Stadium after former coach Charles W. Wantland. The stadium underwent renovations in 2005 with the addition of a three-level press box that includes club seating and new stands on both sides of the field. In 2017, the university began construction of a 45,000 square foot sports performance center located along the north end zone. During the 2021 season after a $10 million donation from Paycom CEO and former Broncho wrestler Chad Richison, the university renamed the structure Chad Richison Stadium. The 2022 renovation expanded the visitors grandstand and replaced a staircase behind the south end zone with a waterfall. The current capacity is 12,000. As of the end of the 2022 season, their current record at home stands at 176–103–5 (.629).

== Rivalries ==
=== Northeastern State ===
Central Oklahoma and the Northeastern State RiverHawks first played each other in 1912 and have since played in 81 contests with Central Oklahoma holding a 55–28–2 advantage. Both teams are primary members of the MIAA. Since 2024, Northeastern State has competed as an independent. The two teams have combined for four NAIA national championships, with NSU winning in 1958 and 1994, and UCO winning in 1962 and 1982. The teams also played in an NAIA playoff game in 1982. Except for 2020, this game has been played annually since 1997, when Northeastern State became NCAA Division II members. That year, NSU joined the Bronchos in the Lone Star Conference. Beginning in 1998, the two programs have competed for the President's Cup. In 2010, UCO and Northeastern State both left the LSC and joined the MIAA in 2012. Central Oklahoma currently leads 17–10 in the trophy series. In 2026, the two programs will not face each other.

== All-time record vs. current MIAA teams ==
Official record (including any NCAA imposed vacates and forfeits) against all current MIAA opponents as of the end of the 2025 NCAA Division II football season.

Opponent	Won	Lost	Tied	Percentage	Streak	First meeting
Central Missouri	4	9	0	.308	Lost 1	2012
Emporia State	14	11	1	.558	Won 2	1928
Fort Hays State	11	7	0	.611	Won 2	1955
Missouri Southern	9	4	0	.692	Won 3	2012
Missouri Western	5	9	0	.357	Won 2	2005
Nebraska–Kearney	8	6	0	.571	Lost 1	1979
Northwest Missouri State	5	12	0	.294	Lost 1	1984
Pittsburg State	4	17	1	.205	Lost 9	1915
Washburn	9	5	0	.643	Won 3	2011
Totals	69	80	2	.464		

== Postseason history ==
Central Oklahoma football teams have been invited to participate in six NAIA playoffs, five NCAA Division II playoffs, and three bowl games. They have garnered a record of 11–9 in the playoffs. Central Oklahoma's most recent postseason appearance was in the 2024 NCAA Division II playoffs where they lost to Ferris State in the second round.

=== NAIA playoffs ===
The Bronchos made six appearances in the NAIA playoffs and won the national championship twice. Their combined record is 7–4.

Year	Round	Opponent	Result
1962	Semifinal; Camellia Bowl	vs. College of Emporia vs. Lenoir–Rhyne	W 20–0; W 28–13
1972	Semifinal	at East Texas State	L 0–54
1979	First round Semifinal; Championship	at Kearney State; Presbyterian; Texas A&I	W 42–22; W 28–6; L 14–20
1982	First round Semifinal; Championship	at Southern Colorado at Northeastern State; Mesa State	W 61–20; W 28–17; W 14–11
1983	First round	Saginaw Valley State	L 13–14
1985	First round	at Henderson State	L 15–18

=== NCAA Division II playoffs ===
The Bronchos has made five appearances in the NCAA Division II playoffs. Their combined record is 4–5.

Year	Round	Opponent	Result
1996	First round Quarterfinal	Chadron State at UC Davis	W 21–19; L 7–26
1998	First round Quarterfinal	Chadron State; Texas A&M–Kingsville*	W 23–21; L 21–24 (OT)
1999	First round	at UC Davis	L 17–33
2003	First round Semifinal	at Mesa State at Texas A&M–Kingsville	W 20–15; L 6–49
2024	First round Second round	Ouachita Baptist at Ferris State	W 38–31 (OT); L 17–78

- Texas A&M–Kingsville later forfeited their 1998 postseason.

=== NCAA Division II bowl games ===
NCAA Division II bowl game invitations are for teams that do not qualify for the playoffs. Since 2014, the Bronchos have played in four bowl games with a 3–1 record. Central Oklahoma's most recent bowl game was in the 2018 C.H.A.M.P.S. Heart of Texas Bowl where they defeated the Angelo State Rams 41–34.

Year	Bowl	Opponent	Result
2014	Mineral Water Bowl	Sioux Falls	L 10–42
2015	Texarkana Bowl	Southwestern Oklahoma State	W 38–21
2017	Corsicana Bowl	Tarleton State	W 38–31
2018	Heart of Texas Bowl	Angelo State	W 41–34

== Conference opponents ==
2026
at Washburn
Northwest Missouri State
at Central Missouri
Fort Hays State
at Emporia State
at Pittsburg State
Nebraska–Kearney
at Missouri Southern
Missouri Western

== Future non-conference opponents ==
2026	2027	2028	2029
at Texas Wesleyan	Texas Wesleyan	Midwestern State	at Midwestern State
at Central Arkansas	at Midwestern State	at West Texas A&M	West Texas A&M
