= Chuck Langston =

American football coach

Current position
- Title: Head coach
- Team: West Brook HS (TX)
- Record: 16–34

Biographical details
- Born: c. 1973 (age 52–53)

Playing career
- 1991–1995: Oklahoma
- Position: Center

Coaching career (HC unless noted)
- 1996: Oklahoma (GA)
- 1997–1999: Oklahoma (TE/DL)
- 2000–2002: Trinity Valley
- 2003–2007: Central Oklahoma
- 2008: Groveton HS (TX) (assistant)
- 2009–2011: Trinity HS (TX)
- 2012: Lamar (DFO)
- 2013–2014: Lamar (OL)
- 2015–2016: Lamar (OC/OL)
- 2017–2018: North Texas (OL)
- 2020: Port Arthur Memorial HS (TX) (OL)
- 2021–present: West Brook HS (TX)

Head coaching record
- Overall: 29–24 (college); 19–13 (junior college); 49–28 (high school)
- Bowls: 1–0 (junior college)
- Tournaments: 1–1 (NCAA D-II playoffs); 1–2 (SWJCFC playoffs)

Accomplishments and honors

Championships
- 2 LSC North Division (2004, 2007)

Chuck Langston (born c. 1973) is an American football coach. He is the head football coach at West Brook High School in Beaumont, Texas, a position he has held since 2021. Langston was the head football coach at Trinity Valley Community College in Athens, Texas from 2000 to 2002 and the University of Central Oklahoma from 2003 to 2007. He compiled a record of 19–13 in three seasons at Trinity Valley and led his team to a 33–22 victory in the C.H.A.M.P.S. Heart of Texas Bowl in 2002.

Langston grew up in Beaumont and attended West Brook High School.

== Head coaching record ==
=== College ===
Year	Team	Overall	Conference	Standing	Bowl/playoffs	AFCA^{#}
Central Oklahoma Bronchos (Lone Star Conference) (2003–2007)
2003	Central Oklahoma	9–3	6–2 / 3–2	T–2nd / T–2nd (North)	L NCAA Division II Quarterfinal	20
2004	Central Oklahoma	8–2	7–2 / 4–1	T–2nd / T–1st (North)		21
2005	Central Oklahoma	3–7	3–6 / 2–3	10th / T–3rd (North)		
2006	Central Oklahoma	5–6	4–5 / 2–3	T–6th / T–4th (North)		
2007	Central Oklahoma	4–6	4–5 / 3–2	7th / T–1st (North)		
Central Oklahoma:		29–24	24–20			
Total:		29–24				
National championship Conference title Conference division title or championship game berth

=== Junior college ===
Year	Team	Overall	Conference	Standing	Bowl/playoffs
Trinity Valley Cardinals (Southwest Junior College Football Conference) (2000–2002)
2000	Trinity Valley	5–6	4–3	T–4th	L SWJCFC semifinal
2001	Trinity Valley	4–5	3–4	T–5th	
2002	Trinity Valley	10–2	5–1	T–1st	L SWJCFC championship, W C.H.A.M.P.S. Heart of Texas Bowl
Trinity Valley:		19–13	12–8		
Total:		19–13			

=== High school ===
Year	Team	Overall	Conference	Standing	Bowl/playoffs
Trinity Trojans () (2009–2011)
2009	Trinity	15–2	7–0	1st	
2010	Trinity	15–1	8–0	1st	
2011	Trinity	13–1	8–0	1st	
Trinity:		43–4	23–0		
West Brook Bruins () (2021–present)
2021	West Brook	5–5	2–4	5th	
2022	West Brook	1–9	1–6	7th	
2023	West Brook	0–10	0–7	8th	
2024	West Brook	4–6	2–4	5th	
2025	West Brook	6–4	2–4	5th	
West Brook:		16–34	7–25		
Total:		59–38			
National championship Conference title Conference division title or championship game berth
