= 1982 NAIA Division I football season =

American college football season

- Regular season: August–November 1982
- Postseason: December 4–18, 1982
- National Championship: Wantland Stadium; Edmond, OK
- Champions: Central State (OK) (2)

The 1982 NAIA Division I football season was the 27th season of college football sponsored by the NAIA, was the 13th season of play of the NAIA's top division for football.

The season was played from August to November 1982 and culminated in the 1982 NAIA Champion Bowl, played this year on December 18, 1982 at Wantland Stadium in Edmond, Oklahoma on the campus of Central State University (now Central Oklahoma).

Central State (OK) defeated Mesa in the Champion Bowl, 14–11, to win their second NAIA national title.

== Conference standings ==
1982 Arkansas Intercollegiate Conference football standings
	Conf.					Overall
Team	W		L		T	W		L		T
No. 8 Ouachita Baptist $^	6	–	0	–	0	8	–	3	–	0
Central Arkansas	3	–	1	–	2	4	–	2	–	3
Henderson State	3	–	2	–	1	4	–	5	–	1
Southern Arkansas	2	–	3	–	1	5	–	4	–	1
Arkansas–Monticello	2	–	4	–	0	3	–	6	–	0
Arkansas Tech	2	–	4	–	0	3	–	7	–	0
Harding	1	–	5	–	0	5	–	6	–	0
$ – Conference champion; ^ – NAIA Division I playoff participant; Rankings from NAIA Division I poll

1982 Central States Intercollegiate Conference football standings
	Conf.					Overall
Team	W		L		T	W		L		T
No. 13 Pittsburg State +	6	–	1	–	0	7	–	2	–	0
Kearney State +	6	–	1	–	0	6	–	4	–	0
No. 16 Missouri Southern	5	–	1	–	1	7	–	2	–	1
Fort Hays State	4	–	2	–	1	6	–	3	–	1
Missouri Western	3	–	4	–	0	5	–	5	–	0
Emporia State	1	–	6	–	0	3	–	7	–	0
Wayne State (NE)	1	–	6	–	0	2	–	8	–	0
Washburn	1	–	6	–	0	1	–	9	–	0
+ – Conference co-champions; Rankings from NAIA Division I poll

1982 Evergreen Conference football standings
	Conf.					Overall
Team	W		L		T	W		L		T
No. 12 Central Washington +	4	–	1	–	0	8	–	2	–	0
No. 14 Oregon Tech +	4	–	1	–	0	7	–	2	–	0
Southern Oregon	3	–	1	–	0	6	–	4	–	0
Eastern Oregon	2	–	2	–	0	5	–	4	–	0
Western Oregon	1	–	4	–	0	3	–	6	–	0
Western Washington	0	–	5	–	0	1	–	8	–	0
+ – Conference co-champions; Rankings from NAIA Division I poll

1982 Great Lakes Intercollegiate Athletic Conference football standings
	Conf.					Overall
Team	W		L		T	W		L		T
No. 1 Hillsdale $^	6	–	0	–	0	12	–	1	–	0
Grand Valley State	5	–	1	–	0	7	–	3	–	0
Northwood	4	–	2	–	0	6	–	4	–	0
Wayne State (MI)	2	–	4	–	0	3	–	7	–	0
Ferris State	2	–	4	–	0	2	–	6	–	0
Michigan Tech	1	–	5	–	0	1	–	8	–	0
Saginaw Valley State	1	–	5	–	0	1	–	9	–	0
$ – Conference champion; ^ – NAIA Division I playoff participant; Rankings from NAIA Division I poll

1982 Northern Intercollegiate Conference football standings
	Conf.					Overall
Team	W		L		T	W		L		T
No. 6 Moorhead State $^	5	–	0	–	1	7	–	2	–	1
Minnesota Duluth	5	–	1	–	0	7	–	2	–	0
Minnesota Morris	3	–	2	–	1	4	–	4	–	2
Northern State	2	–	4	–	0	3	–	6	–	0
Southwest State (MN)	2	–	4	–	0	2	–	7	–	0
Bemidji State	2	–	4	–	0	2	–	8	–	0
Winona State	1	–	5	–	0	3	–	6	–	0
$ – Conference champion; ^ – NAIA Division I playoff participant; Rankings from NAIA Division I poll

1982 Oklahoma Intercollegiate Conference football standings
	Conf.					Overall
Team	W		L		T	W		L		T
No. 2 Northeastern State $^	4	–	0	–	0	11	–	1	–	0
No. 18 SW Oklahoma State	3	–	1	–	0	7	–	3	–	0
East Central	2	–	2	–	0	5	–	5	–	0
SE Oklahoma State	1	–	3	–	0	1	–	8	–	0
NW Oklahoma State	0	–	4	–	0	2	–	8	–	0
$ – Conference champion; ^ – NAIA Division I playoff participantpoll=NAIA Division I poll; Rankings from AP Poll

1982 Rocky Mountain Athletic Conference football standings
	Conf.					Overall
Team	W		L		T	W		L		T
No. 4 Mesa $^	7	–	0	–	1	11	–	1	–	1
No. 5 Southern Colorado ^	7	–	1	–	0	9	–	2	–	0
Southern Utah	5	–	1	–	2	6	–	2	–	2
Adams State	3	–	3	–	2	3	–	4	–	2
Fort Lewis	3	–	4	–	1	4	–	5	–	1
Western New Mexico	2	–	5	–	1	4	–	5	–	1
Western State (CO)	2	–	6	–	0	3	–	6	–	0
New Mexico Highlands	1	–	6	–	1	2	–	7	–	1
Colorado Mines	1	–	7	–	0	2	–	7	–	0
$ – Conference champion; ^ – NAIA Division I playoff participant; Rankings from NAIA Division I poll

1982 South Atlantic Conference football standings
	Conf.					Overall
Team	W		L		T	W		L		T
No. 3 Carson–Newman $^	6	–	1	–	0	10	–	2	–	0
No. 15 Elon	5	–	2	–	0	7	–	3	–	0
No. 17 Gardner–Webb	5	–	2	–	0	7	–	3	–	0
Presbyterian	4	–	2	–	1	5	–	5	–	1
Lenoir–Rhyne	3	–	3	–	1	5	–	5	–	1
Newberry	3	–	4	–	0	5	–	6	–	0
Mars Hill	1	–	6	–	0	1	–	10	–	0
Catawba	0	–	7	–	0	2	–	9	–	0
$ – Conference champion; ^ – NAIA Division I playoff participant; Rankings from NAIA Division I poll

1982 West Virginia Intercollegiate Athletic Conference football standings
	Conf.					Overall
Team	W		L		T	W		L		T
No. 10 Shepherd $	7	–	1	–	0	7	–	2	–	1
No. 20 Concord	6	–	2	–	0	6	–	3	–	0
Fairmont State	6	–	2	–	0	6	–	3	–	0
West Virginia State	5	–	3	–	0	5	–	4	–	0
West Virginia Wesleyan	4	–	4	–	0	5	–	5	–	0
West Liberty State	3	–	5	–	0	3	–	6	–	1
Glenville State	2	–	5	–	1	3	–	6	–	1
West Virginia Tech	1	–	5	–	2	5	–	4	–	1
Salem	0	–	7	–	1	0	–	9	–	1
$ – Conference champion; Rankings from NAIA Division I poll

1982 Wisconsin State University Conference football standings
	Conf.					Overall
Team	W		L		T	W		L		T
No. 11 Wisconsin–La Crosse $	7	–	1	–	0	8	–	2	–	0
Wisconsin–River Falls	6	–	2	–	0	7	–	2	–	1
Wisconsin–Eau Claire	6	–	2	–	0	6	–	4	–	0
Wisconsin–Stout	5	–	3	–	0	8	–	3	–	0
Wisconsin–Whitewater	4	–	4	–	0	7	–	4	–	0
Wisconsin–Platteville	3	–	5	–	0	5	–	5	–	0
Wisconsin–Stevens Point	3	–	5	–	0	3	–	7	–	0
Wisconsin–Oshkosh	1	–	7	–	0	3	–	7	–	0
Wisconsin–Superior	1	–	7	–	0	2	–	9	–	0
$ – Conference champion; Wisconsin–Stevens Point forfeited 3 games.; Rankings from NAIA Division I poll

1982 NAIA Division I independents football records
	Conf.			Overall
Team	W	L	T	W		L		T
No. 7 Central State (OK) ^		–		10	–	2	–	0
No. 9 Wofford		–		8	–	3	–	0
No. 19 Liberty Baptist		–		7	–	4	–	0
Guilford		–		5	–	5	–	0
Cameron		–		4	–	5	–	0
Eastern New Mexico		–		4	–	6	–	0
Kentucky State		–		2	–	9	–	0
Langston		–		0	–	10	–	0
^ – NAIA Division I playoff participant; Rankings from NAIA Division I poll

== Conference champions ==
Conference	Champion	Record
Arkansas Intercollegiate	Ouachita Baptist	6–0
Central States	Pittsburg State; Kearney State	6–1
Evergreen	Central Washington; Oregon Tech	4–1
NIC	Moorhead State (MN)	5–0–1
Oklahoma	Northeastern State	4–0
RMAC	Mesa	7–0–1
South Atlantic	Carson–Newman	6–1
WVIAC	Shepherd	7–1
WSUC	Wisconsin–La Crosse	7–1

== Postseason ==
Quarterfinals; December 4, 1982; Campus sites
Carson–Newman	12
Hillsdale*	20
Moorhead State	20
Mesa*	43
Central State (OK)	61
Southern Colorado*	20
Ouachita Baptist	23
Northeastern State*	38

Semifinals; December 11, 1982; Campus sites
Hillsdale	9
Mesa*	18
Central State (OK)	28
Northeastern State*	17

1982 Champion Bowl; December 18, 1982; Edmond, OK
Mesa State	11
Central State (OK)	14

== See also ==
- 1982 NAIA Division II football season
- 1982 NCAA Division I-A football season
- 1982 NCAA Division I-AA football season
- 1982 NCAA Division II football season
- 1982 NCAA Division III football season
