= Oklahoma Collegiate Conference =

The Oklahoma Collegiate Conference (OCC), also known as the Oklahoma Collegiate Athletic Conference (OCAC), was an intercollegiate athletic conference that existed from 1929 to 1974. The conference's members were located in the state of Oklahoma. The league's predecessor was the first iteration of the Oklahoma Intercollegiate Conference, and its successor was the OIC's second iteration.

== Football champions ==
- 1929 – Central State
- 1930 – East Central State
- 1931 – Central State
- 1932 – Central State and Southwestern State
- 1933 – Southwestern State
- 1934 – Central State
- 1935 – Central State and East Central State
- 1936 – Central State
- 1937 – Central State
- 1938 – Central State
- 1939 – Central State
- 1940 – Oklahoma Baptist
- 1941 – Central State
- 1942 – Central State
- 1943 – No champion
- 1944 – No champion
- 1945 – No champion
- 1946 – Southeastern State
- 1947 – Southeastern State
- 1948 – Central State and Southeastern State
- 1949 – Central State
- 1950 – Central State and Southwestern State
- 1951 – Northeastern State
- 1952 – Northeastern State
- 1953 – Northeastern State
- 1954 – Central State and Southwestern State
- 1955 – Central State, Northeastern State, and Southwestern State
- 1956 – Central State and Northeastern State
- 1957 – Southwestern State
- 1958 – Northeastern State
- 1959 – Langston
- 1960 – Langston
- 1961 – Central State (OK) and Langston
- 1962 – Central State (OK)
- 1963 – Northeastern State
- 1964 – East Central State
- 1965 – East Central State
- 1966 – East Central State
- 1967 – East Central State and Southeastern State
- 1968 – Southeastern State
- 1969 – Northeastern State and Southeastern State
- 1970 – Southwestern State
- 1971 – Southwestern State
- 1972 – Central State
- 1973 – Langston

== See also ==
- List of defunct college football conferences
- Great American Conference – the NCAA Division II conference home to many of the OCAC's former members
- Sooner Athletic Conference – the present-day NAIA conference with teams in Oklahoma
