= 2015 Houston Baptist Huskies football team =

American college football season

2015 Houston Baptist Huskies football
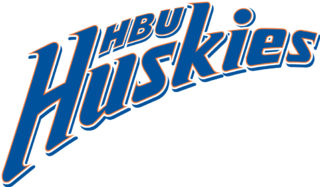
- Conference: Southland Conference
- Record: 2–9 (0–8 Southland)
- Head coach: Vic Shealy (3rd season)
- Offensive coordinator: Scott Smith (3rd season)
- Offensive scheme: Multiple
- Co-defensive coordinators: Roger Hinshaw (3rd season); Charlie Camp (1st season)
- Base defense: 4–3
- Home stadium: Husky Stadium

2015 Southland Conference football standings
| | Conf. | | | Overall |
| Team | W | | L | W | | L |
|---|---|---|---|---|---|---|
| No. 7 McNeese State $^ | 9 | – | 0 | 10 | – | 1 |
| No. 3 Sam Houston State ^ | 7 | – | 2 | 11 | – | 4 |
| Central Arkansas | 7 | – | 2 | 7 | – | 4 |
| Incarnate Word * | 5 | – | 4 | 6 | – | 5 |
| Lamar | 4 | – | 5 | 5 | – | 6 |
| Northwestern State | 4 | – | 5 | 4 | – | 7 |
| Stephen F. Austin | 4 | – | 5 | 4 | – | 7 |
| SE Louisiana | 3 | – | 6 | 4 | – | 7 |
| Abilene Christian * | 3 | – | 6 | 3 | – | 8 |
| Nicholls State | 3 | – | 6 | 3 | – | 8 |
| Houston Baptist | 0 | – | 8 | 2 | – | 9 |
$ – Conference champion; ^ – FCS playoff participant; * – ineligible for FCS playoffs due to transition from NCAA Division II; Rankings from STATS poll

The 2015 Houston Baptist Huskies football team represented Houston Baptist University—now known as Houston Christian University—as a member of the Southland Conference during the 2015 NCAA Division I FCS football season. Led by third-year head coach Vic Shealy the Huskies compiled an overall record of 2–9 with a mark of 0–8 in conference play, placing last out of 11 teams in the Southland. Houston Baptist played home games at Husky Stadium in Houston.

== Schedule ==
| Date | Time | Opponent | Site | TV | Result | Attendance |
|---|---|---|---|---|---|---|
| September 5 | 7:00 p.m. | Bethany (WV)* | Husky Stadium; Houston, TX | RTSW* | W 51–7 | 2,821 |
| September 12 | 7:00 p.m. | Northern Colorado* | Husky Stadium; Houston, TX | RTSW* | L 10–34 | 3,185 |
| September 19 | 6:00 p.m. | at Abilene Christian | Shotwell Stadium; Abilene, TX | | L 21–49 | 7,327 |
| September 26 | 6:00 p.m. | at No. 12 Sam Houston State | Bowers Stadium; Huntsville, TX | FCS Central | L 14–63 | 9,014 |
| October 3 | 7:00 p.m. | College of Faith (AR)*^{†} | Husky Stadium; Houston, TX | RTSW* | W 65–0 | 2,817 |
| October 10 | 2:30 p.m. | Central Arkansas | Husky Stadium; Houston, TX | ASN | L 7–43 | 2,217 |
| October 17 | 3:00 p.m. | at Nicholls | John L. Guidry Stadium; Thibodaux, LA | | L 17–38 | 5,101 |
| October 24 | 2:00 p.m. | Southeastern Louisiana | Husky Stadium; Houston, TX | RTSW* | L 7–22 | 1,730 |
| October 31 | 2:00 p.m. | Lamar | Husky Stadium; Houston, TX | RTSW* | L 7–55 | 1,748 |
| November 14 | 3:00 p.m. | at Stephen F. Austin | Homer Bryce Stadium; Nacogdoches, TX | ESPN3 | L 20–55 | 4,305 |
| November 21 | 2:00 p.m. | Incarnate Word | Husky Stadium; Houston, TX | | L 3–30 | 2,251 |
*Non-conference game; ^{†}Homecoming; Rankings from STATS Poll released prior to the game; All times are in Central time

* Games were televised on tape delay.

== Game summaries ==
=== Bethany College ===
Bethany College at Houston Baptist

| Team | 1 | 2 | 3 | 4 | Total |
|---|---|---|---|---|---|
| Bison | 0 | 7 | 0 | 0 | 7 |
| • Huskies | 20 | 17 | 7 | 7 | 51 |

- Date: September 5
- Location: Husky Stadium
  Houston, TX
- Game start: 7:00 PM CDT
- Game attendance: 2,821

Scoring summary
| 1 | 11:27 | Houston Baptist | Taylor Holmes 0 yard return of blocked punt (Travis Shinn kick failed), Drive: 3 plays, -8 yards, 1:53 | 6–0 |
| 1 | 7:33 | Houston Baptist | B.J. Kelly 4 yard run (Travis Shinn kick) Drive: 6 plays, 88 yards, 2:28 | 13–0 |
| 1 | 5:08 | Houston Baptist | D'Angelo Wallace 19 yard pass from Max Staver (Travis Shinn kick), Drive: 2 plays, 40 yards, 0:41 | 20–0 |
| 2 | 12:34 | Houston Baptist | Deion Lilly 1 yard run (Travis Shinn kick), Drive: 6 plays, 74 yards, 2:45 | 27–0 |
| 2 | 7:16 | Bethany | Fred White 12 yard pass from Virgil Bridges (Adam Maisch kick), Drive: 6 plays, 80 yards, 2:14 | 27–7 |
| 2 | 4:23 | Houston Baptist | Travis Shinn 30 yard field goal, Drive: 7 plays, 68 yards, 2:44 | 30–7 |
| 2 | 2:20 | Houston Baptist | Brandon Taylor 64 yard punt return (Travis Shinn kick), Drive: 3 plays, -11 yards, 1:55 | 37–7 |
| 3 | 8:26 | Houston Baptist | Brandon Taylor 15 yard pass from Max Staver (Travis Shinn kick), Drive: 6 plays, 49 yards, 3:04 | 44–7 |
| 4 | 8:42 | Houston Baptist | Deion Lilly 1 yard run (Travis Shinn kick) Drive: 9 plays, 88 yards, 3:41 | 51–7 |

=== Northern Colorado ===
Northern Colorado at Houston Baptist

| Team | 1 | 2 | 3 | 4 | Total |
|---|---|---|---|---|---|
| • Bears | 6 | 7 | 14 | 7 | 34 |
| Huskies | 3 | 0 | 0 | 7 | 10 |

- Date: September 12
- Location: Husky Stadium
- Game start: 7:00 PM CDT
- Game attendance: 3,185

Scoring summary
| 1 | 11:27 | Northern Colorado | Jonathan Newsom 4 yard run (Marques Combs kick failed), Drive: 3 plays, 60 yards, 0:40 | 0–6 |
| 1 | 3:18 | Houston Baptist | Travis Shinn 32 yard field goal, Drive: 12 plays, 57 yards, 5:30 | 3–6 |
| 2 | 1:00 | Northern Colorado | Ellis Onic 71 yard punt return (Marques Combs kick), Drive: 3 plays, 0 yards, 1:33 | 3–13 |
| 3 | 9:01 | Northern Colorado | Stephen Miller 19 yard pass from Jacob Knipp (Marques Combs kick), Drive: 7 plays, 73 yards, 2:02 | 3–20 |
| 3 | 5:26 | Northern Colorado | Trae Riek 3 yard run (Marques Combs kick), Drive: 7 plays, 35 yards, 2:26 | 3–27 |
| 4 | 11:15 | Houston Baptist | Ethan Fry 19 yard pass from Max Staver (Travis Shinn kick), Drive: 14 plays, 77 yards, 9:01 | 10–27 |
| 4 | 6:50 | Northern Colorado | Anthony Davis 36 yard run (Marques Combs kick), Drive: 1 play, 36 yards, 0:10 | 10–34 |

=== @ Abilene Christian ===
Houston Baptist at Abilene Christian

| Team | 1 | 2 | 3 | 4 | Total |
|---|---|---|---|---|---|
| Huskies | 7 | 7 | 0 | 7 | 21 |
| • Wildcats | 7 | 14 | 21 | 7 | 49 |

- Date: September 19
- Location: Shotwell Stadium
  Abilene, TX
- Game start: 6:00 PM CDT
- Elapsed time: 9
- Game attendance: 7,327

Scoring summary
| 1 | 11:55 | Abilene Christian | Jonathan Epps 6 yard pass from Parker McKenzie (Zach Lehr kick), Drive: 5 plays, 64 yards, 2:07 | 0–7 |
| 1 | 1:23 | Houston Baptist | B.J. Kelly 12 yard run (Travis Shinn kick), Drive: 10 plays, 66 yards, 4:53 | 7–7 |
| 2 | 9:31 | Houston Baptist | Mev Ajdin 1 yard run (Travis Shinn kick), Drive: 10 plays, 63 yards, 5:29 | 14–7 |
| 2 | 6:31 | Abilene Christian | Herschel Sims 9 yard run (Zach Lehr kick), Drive: 7 plays, 68 yards, 2:54 | 14–14 |
| 2 | 2:01 | Abilene Christian | De'Andre Brown 1 yard run (Zach Lehr kick), Drive: 8 plays, 33 yards, 3:26 | 14–21 |
| 3 | 10:52 | Abilene Christian | Cedric Gilbert 8 yard pass from Parker McKenzie (Zach Lehr kick), Drive: 8 plays, 65 yards, 4:08 | 14–28 |
| 3 | 5:42 | Abilene Christian | Jamie Walker 3 yard pass from Cody Ennis (Zach Lehr kick), Drive: 9 plays, 58 yards, 3:25 | 14–35 |
| 3 | 0:01 | Abilene Christian | Herschel Sims 35 yard run (Zach Lehr kick), Drive: 7 plays, 65 yards, 3:14 | 14–42 |
| 4 | 11:25 | Houston Baptist | B.J. Kelly 12 yard run (Travis Shinn kick), Drive: 4 plays, 18 yards, 1:07 | 21–42 |
| 4 | 2:19 | Abilene Christian | Jonathan Epps 8 yard pass from Parker McKenzie (Zach Lehr kick), Drive: 11 plays, 83 yards, 6:40 | 21–49 |

=== @ Sam Houston State ===
Houston Baptist at Sam Houston State

| Team | 1 | 2 | 3 | 4 | Total |
|---|---|---|---|---|---|
| Huskies | 7 | 7 | 0 | 0 | 14 |
| • #12 Bearkats | 14 | 14 | 28 | 7 | 63 |

- Date: September 26
- Location: Bowers Stadium
  Huntsville, TX
- Game start: 6:00 PM CDT
- Game attendance: 9,014

Scoring summary
| 1 | 11:36 | Sam Houston State | Jared Johnson 86 yard pass complete to Gerald Thomas (Luc Swimberghe kick), Drive: 2 plays, 87 yards, 0:34 | 0–7 |
| 1 | 4:43 | Houston Baptist | Tony Dawson 14 yard pass complete to Wesley Lewis (Christian Guzman kick), Drive: 11 plays, 70 yards, 6:48 | 7–7 |
| 1 | 2:55 | Sam Houston State | Jared Johnson 7 yard run (Luc Swimberghe kick), Drive: 7 plays, 87 yards, 1:48 | 7–14 |
| 2 | 6:12 | Houston Baptist | Terrance Peters 82 yard run (Christian Guzman kick), Drive: 3 plays, 90 yards, 1:52 | 14–14 |
| 2 | 4:12 | Sam Houston State | LaDarius Brown 12 yard pass from Jeremiah Briscoe (Luc Swimberghe kick), Drive: 8 plays, 0 yards, 3:52 | 14–21 |
| 2 | 0:15 | Sam Houston State | Gerald Thomas 38 yard pass from Jeremiah Briscoe (Carlos Teal kick), Drive: 5 plays, 83 yards, 1:53 | 14–28 |
| 3 | 11:49 | Sam Houston State | Jared Johnson 2 yard pass complete to LaDarius Brown (Luc Swimberghe kick), Drive: 8 plays, 56 yards, 2:56 | 14–35 |
| 3 | 10:18 | Sam Houston State | Gerald Thomas 25 yard interception return (Luc Swimberghe kick), Drive: 3 plays, -1 yard, 1:31 | 14–42 |
| 3 | 8:03 | Sam Houston State | Jalen Overstreet run for 9 yards (Luc Swimberghe kick), Drive: 5 plays, 32 yards, 1:20 | 14–49 |
| 3 | 0:57 | Sam Houston State | Jared Johnson run for 10 yards (Luc Swimberghe kick), Drive: 9 plays, 71 yards, 2:44 | 14–56 |
| 4 | 12:10 | Sam Houston State | Stephen Williams 25 yard pass from Jeremiah Briscoe (Luc Swimberghe kick), Drive: 8 plays, 69 yards, 2:03 | 14–63 |

=== College of Faith (homecoming) ===
See footnote

College of Faith at Houston Baptist

| Team | 1 | 2 | 3 | 4 | Total |
|---|---|---|---|---|---|
| Warriors | 0 | 0 | 0 | 0 | 0 |
| • Huskies | 14 | 23 | 14 | 14 | 65 |

- Date: October 3
- Location: Husky Stadium
  Houston, TX
- Game start: 7:00 PM CDT
- Game attendance: 2,817

Scoring summary
| 1 | 11:10 | Houston Baptist | Jackie Robinson 2 yard run (Travis Shinn kick), Drive: 1 play, 2 yards, 0:05 | 7–0 |
| 1 | 8:22 | Houston Baptist | Jackie Robinson 7 yard run (Travis Shinn kick), Drive: 2 plays, 48 yards, 0:35 | 14–0 |
| 2 | 14:55 | Houston Baptist | Larry Day 3 yard run (Travis Shinn kick failed), Drive: 5 plays, 25 yards, 0:05 | 20–0 |
| 2 | 12:14 | Houston Baptist | Brandon Taylor 48 yard punt return (Travis Shinn kick), Drive: 3 plays, 1 yard, 2:34 | 27–0 |
| 2 | 7:37 | Houston Baptist | Jackie Robinson 4 yard run (Travis Shinn kick), Drive: 6 plays, 35 yards, 1:43 | 34–0 |
| 2 | 0:35 | Houston Baptist | Travis Shinn 43 yard field goal, Drive: 4 plays, 0 yards, 0:20 | 37–0 |
| 3 | 7:26 | Houston Baptist | Steven Thompson 6 yard run (Travis Shinn kick), Drive: 4 plays, 54 yards, 1:29 | 44–0 |
| 3 | 5:40 | Houston Baptist | Brandon Taylor 49 yard punt return (Travis Shinn kick), Drive: 3 plays, -1 yard, 1:41 | 51–0 |
| 4 | 14:56 | Houston Baptist | Jonathan Fleming 1 yard run (Jose Betancourt kick), Drive: 5 plays, 33 yards, 1:20 | 58–0 |
| 4 | 2:36 | Houston Baptist | Steven Thompson 8 yard run (Jose Betancourt kick), Drive: 10 plays, 68 yards, 7:59 | 65–0 |

=== Central Arkansas ===
Central Arkansas at Houston Baptist

| Team | 1 | 2 | 3 | 4 | Total |
|---|---|---|---|---|---|
| • Bears | 13 | 13 | 7 | 10 | 43 |
| Huskies | 0 | 7 | 0 | 0 | 7 |

- Date: October 10
- Location: Husky Stadium
  Houston, TX
- Game start: 2:30 PM CDT
- Elapsed time: 3:03
- Game attendance: 2,217
- Game weather: 86 °F (30 °C) • NNE 7 mph (11 km/h) • Sunny
- Referee: Vidal Jones
- Television network: ASN

Scoring summary
| 1 | 8:22 | Central Arkansas | Hayden Hildebrand 6 yard pass to Dominique Thomas (two-pont pass conv. intercepted), Drive: 8 plays, 80 yards, 2:31 | 0–6 |
| 1 | 1:58 | Central Arkansas | Brandon Cox 93 yard punt return (Jace Denker kick), Drive: 9 plays, 43 yards, 6:18 | 0–13 |
| 2 | 12:18 | Central Arkansas | Dominique Thomas 3 yard run (Jace Denker kick failed), Drive: 6 plays, 64 yards, 2:30 | 0–19 |
| 2 | 2:26 | Houston Baptist | Max Staver 18 yard pass to Ricardo Barnett (Travis Shinn kick), Drive: 6 plays, 51 yards, 2:30 | 7–19 |
| 2 | 1:01 | Central Arkansas | Hayden Hildebrand 6 yard pass to Blake Veasley (Jace Denker kick), Drive: 7 plays, 71 yards, 1:25 | 7–26 |
| 3 | 7:53 | Central Arkansas | Hayden Hildebrand 11 yard pass to Blake Veasley (Jace Denker kick), Drive: 9 plays, 72 yards, 3:51 | 7–33 |
| 4 | 11:05 | Central Arkansas | Roman Gordon 12 yard pass from Hayden Hildebrand (Jace Denker kick), Drive: 7 plays, 68 yards, 2:45 | 7–40 |
| 4 | 1:04 | Central Arkansas | Jace Denker 22 yard field goal, Drive: 15 plays, 58 yards, 7:11 | 7–43 |

=== @ Nicholls ===
Houston Baptist at Nicholls

| Team | 1 | 2 | 3 | 4 | Total |
|---|---|---|---|---|---|
| Huskies | 0 | 10 | 0 | 7 | 17 |
| • Colonels | 21 | 0 | 7 | 10 | 38 |

- Date: October 17
- Location: John L. Guidry Stadium
  Thibodaux, LA
- Game start: 3:00 PM CDT
- Game attendance: 5,101

Scoring summary
| 1 | 8:36 | Nicholls | Tuskani Figaro 3 yard run (Francisco Condado kick), Drive: 3 plays, 9 yards, 0:51 | 0–7 |
| 1 | 2:35 | Nicholls | Michael Henry 1 yard run (Francisco Condado kick), Drive: 13 plays, 72 yards, 4:51 | 0–14 |
| 1 | 0:00 | Nicholls | Michael Henry 1 yard run (Francisco Condado kick), Drive: 7 plays, 68 yards, 0:00 | 0–21 |
| 2 | 11:12 | Houston Baptist | B.J. Kelly 1 yard run (Travis Shinn kick), Drive: 2 plays, 50 yards, 0:32 | 7–21 |
| 2 | 0:00 | Houston Baptist | Travis Shinn 43 yard field goal, Drive: 12 plays, 63 yards, 3:36 | 10–21 |
| 3 | 12:32 | Nicholls | Tobias Lofton 39 yard run (Francisco Condado kick), Drive: 6 plays, 65 yards, 2:28 | 10–28 |
| 4 | 9:01 | Nicholls | Tuskani Figaro 14 yard run (Francisco Condado kick), Drive: 14 plays, 80 yards, 7:05 | 10–35 |
| 4 | 6:29 | Nicholls | Francisco Condado 31 yard field goal, Drive: 4 plays, 3 yards, 2:05 | 10–38 |
| 4 | 4:38 | Houston Baptist | B.J. Kelly 3 yard run (Travis Shinn kick), Drive: 6 plays, 69 yards, 1:44 | 17–38 |

=== Southeastern Louisiana ===
Southeastern Louisiana at Houston Baptist

| Team | 1 | 2 | 3 | 4 | Total |
|---|---|---|---|---|---|
| • Lions | 9 | 7 | 0 | 6 | 22 |
| Huskies | 0 | 0 | 0 | 7 | 7 |

- Date: October 24
- Location: Husky Stadium
  Houston, TX
- Game start: 2:00 PM CDT
- Game attendance: 1,730
- Referee: David Alvarez

Scoring summary
| 1 | 3:30 | Southeastern Louisiana | Miki Fangatua Safety, Drive: 3 plays, -1 yard, 1:33 | 0–2 |
| 1 | 0:27 | Southeastern Louisiana | Da'Quan Smith 10 yard pass from D'Shaie Landor (Jonathon Tatum kick), Drive: 6 plays, 43 yards, 2:55 | 0–9 |
| 2 | 0:58 | Southeastern Louisiana | Trey Hallman 2 yard run (Jonathon Tatum kick), Drive: 5 plays, 80 yards, 1:17 | 0–16 |
| 4 | 9:24 | Southeastern Louisiana | Julius Maraclin 5 yard run (Jonathon Tatum kick failed), Drive: 4 plays, 66 yards, 1:50 | 0–22 |
| 4 | 8:38 | Houston Baptist | Terrance Peters 77 yard run (Travis Shinn kick), Drive: 2 plays, 83 yards, 0:40 | 7–22 |

=== Lamar ===
Lamar at Houston Baptist

| Team | 1 | 2 | 3 | 4 | Total |
|---|---|---|---|---|---|
| • Cardinals | 14 | 20 | 14 | 7 | 55 |
| Huskies | 0 | 7 | 0 | 0 | 7 |

- Date: October 31
- Location: Husky Stadium
  Houston, TX
- Game start: 2:00 PM CDT
- Elapsed time: 3:02
- Game attendance: 1,748
- Game weather: 73 °F (23 °C) • E 4 mph (6.4 km/h) • Overcast
- Referee: Randy Christal
- Television network: RTSW*

Scoring summary
| 1 | 13:09 | Lamar | Kade Harrington 29 yd pass from Joe Minden (Alex Ball kick), Drive: 6 plays, 74 yards, 1:51 | 0–7 |
| 1 | 3:29 | Lamar | Devonne Brown 29 yard pass from Joe Minden (Alex Ball kick), Drive: 8 plays, 76 yards, 2:36 | 0–14 |
| 2 | 14:20 | Lamar | Alex Ball 49 yard field goal, Drive: 7 plays, 51 yards, 2:03 | 0–17 |
| 2 | 9:10 | Lamar | Alex Ball 27 yard field goal, Drive: 11 plays, 44 yards, 3:37 | 0–20 |
| 2 | 4:52 | Lamar | Kade Harrington 7 yard run (Alex Ball kick), Drive: 6 plays, 48 yards, 2:31 | 0–27 |
| 2 | 2:52 | Lamar | Devonn Brown 45 yard pass from Joe Minden (Alex Ball kick), Drive: 2 plays, 61 yards, 0:37 | 0–34 |
| 2 | 0:41 | Houston Baptist | Tony Dawson 34 yard run (Travis Shinn kick), Drive: 7 plays, 75 yards, 2:11 | 7–34 |
| 3 | 10:40 | Lamar | Seth Ellis 73 yard punt return (Alex Ball kick), Drive: 3 plays, 1 yard, 1:45 | 7–41 |
| 3 | 5:23 | Lamar | Kade Harrington 9 yard run (Alex Ball kick), Drive: 9 plays, 62 yards, 3:43 | 7–48 |
| 4 | 3:07 | Lamar | Carson Earp 9 yard run (Alex Ball kick), Drive: 4 plays, 61 yards, 2:11 | 7–55 |

=== @ Stephen F. Austin ===
Houston Baptist at Stephen F. Austin

| Team | 1 | 2 | 3 | 4 | Total |
|---|---|---|---|---|---|
| Huskies | 7 | 3 | 3 | 7 | 20 |
| • Lumberjacks | 7 | 13 | 28 | 7 | 55 |

- Date: November 14
- Location: Homer Bryce Stadium
  Nacogdoches, TX
- Game start: 3:00 PM CST
- Game attendance: 4,305
- Referee: M. Vanderville
- Television network: ESPN3

Scoring summary
| 1 | 10:58 | Stephen F. Austin | Judah Jones 10 yard pass from Zach Conque (Mason Juhl kick), Drive: 7 plays, 72 yards, 2:47 | 0–7 |
| 1 | 2:14 | Houston Baptist | Mev Adjin 28 yard pass from Max Staver (Travis Shinn kick), Drive: 5 plays, 72 yards, 1:38 | 7–7 |
| 2 | 14:01 | Stephen F. Austin | Mason Juhl 38 yard field goal, Drive: 10 plays, 57 yards, 3:07 | 7–10 |
| 2 | 9:12 | Stephen F. Austin | Mason Juhl 39 yard field goal, Drive: 7 plays, 39 yards, 2:10 | 7–13 |
| 2 | 4:10 | Stephen F. Austin | Justic Liggins 8 yard pass from Zach Conque (Mason Juhl kick), Drive: 8 plays, 46 yards, 2:58 | 7–20 |
| 2 | 0:47 | Houston Baptist | Travis Shinn 27 yard field goal, Drive: 8 plays, 55 yards, 3:23 | 10–20 |
| 3 | 11:33 | Stephen F. Austin | Zach Conque 1 yard run (Mason Juhl kick), Drive: 9 plays, 90 yards, 3:19 | 10–27 |
| 3 | 8:59 | Houston Baptist | Travis Shinn 42 yard field goal, Drive: 6 plays, 39 yards, 2:28 | 13–27 |
| 3 | 7:18 | Stephen F. Austin | Zach Conque 40 yard run (Mason Juhl kick), Drive: 4 plays, 74 yards, 1:36 | 13–34 |
| 3 | 4:23 | Stephen F. Austin | Aaron Piper 34 yard pass from Zach Conque (Mason Juhl kick), Drive: 4 plays, 59 yards, 1:37 | 13–41 |
| 3 | 0:44 | Stephen F. Austin | Jacol Whitaker 8 yard run (Mason Juhl kick), Drive: 5 plays, 65 yards, 2:28 | 13–48 |
| 4 | 12:26 | Stephen F. Austin | Trevon Smith 32 yard interception return (Mason Juhl kick), Drive: 1 plays, 0 yards, 0:09 | 13–55 |
| 4 | 8:50 | Houston Baptist | Ricard Barnett 28 yard pass from Jonath Fleming (Travis Shinn kick), Drive: 8 plays, 65 yards, 3:36 | 20–55 |

=== Incarnate Word ===
Incarnate Word at Houston Baptist

| Team | 1 | 2 | 3 | 4 | Total |
|---|---|---|---|---|---|
| • Cardinals | 14 | 7 | 7 | 2 | 30 |
| Huskies | 0 | 3 | 0 | 0 | 3 |

- Date: November 21
- Location: Husky Stadium
  Houston, TX
- Game start: 2:00 PM CST
- Elapsed time: 2:35
- Game attendance: 2,251
- Game weather: 63 °F (17 °C), Overcast and windy
- Referee: Marvel Judy

Scoring summary
| 1 | 7:08 | Incarnate Word | Trent Brittain 3 yard run (Cody Seidel kick), Drive: 13 plays, 52 yards, 6:21 | 0–7 |
| 1 | 1:40 | Incarnate Word | Paden Giebler 47 yard fumble return (Cody Seidel kick), Drive: 6 plays, 8 yards, 3:23 | 0–14 |
| 2 | 10:44 | Houston Baptist | Travis Shinn 27 yard field goal, Drive: 13 plays, 64 yards, 5:56 | 3–14 |
| 2 | 2:18 | Incarnate Word | Trent Brittain 8 yard run (Cody Seidel kick), Drive: 13 plays, 60 yards, 6:11 | 3–21 |
| 3 | 4:00 | Incarnate Word | Cole Wick 12 yard pass from Trent Brittain (Cody Seidel kick), Drive: 10 plays, 73 yards, 5:36 | 3–28 |
| 4 | 6:55 | Incarnate Word | Team Safety, Drive: 6 plays, 2 yards, 2:11 | 3–30 |
