= 2015 Stephen F. Austin Lumberjacks football team =

American college football season

2015 Stephen F. Austin Lumberjacks football
- Conference: Southland Conference
- Record: 4–7 (4–5 Southland)
- Head coach: Clint Conque (2nd season)
- Offensive coordinator: Matt Kubik (2nd season)
- Defensive coordinator: Matt Williamson (2nd season)
- Home stadium: Homer Bryce Stadium

2015 Southland Conference football standings
	Conf.			Overall
Team	W		L	W		L
No. 7 McNeese State $^	9	–	0	10	–	1
No. 3 Sam Houston State ^	7	–	2	11	–	4
Central Arkansas	7	–	2	7	–	4
Incarnate Word *	5	–	4	6	–	5
Lamar	4	–	5	5	–	6
Northwestern State	4	–	5	4	–	7
Stephen F. Austin	4	–	5	4	–	7
SE Louisiana	3	–	6	4	–	7
Abilene Christian *	3	–	6	3	–	8
Nicholls State	3	–	6	3	–	8
Houston Baptist	0	–	8	2	–	9
$ – Conference champion; ^ – FCS playoff participant; * – ineligible for FCS playoffs due to transition from NCAA Division II; Rankings from STATS poll

The 2015 Stephen F. Austin Lumberjacks football team represented Stephen F. Austin State University in the 2015 NCAA Division I FCS football season. The Lumberjacks were led by second-year head coach Clint Conque and played their home games at Homer Bryce Stadium. They were members of the Southland Conference.

== Schedule ==
Date	Time	Opponent	Rank	Site	TV	Result	Attendance
September 5	6:00 pm	Northern Arizona*	No. 24	Homer Bryce Stadium; Nacogdoches, TX	ESPN3	L 28–34	8,473
September 12	2:30 pm	at No. 3 (FBS) TCU*		Amon G. Carter Stadium; Fort Worth, TX	FS1	L 7–70	45,786
September 19	6:00 pm	McNeese State		Homer Bryce Stadium; Nacogdoches, TX	ESPN3	L 14–28	12,018
September 26	2:30 pm	at Abilene Christian		Shotwell Stadium; Abilene, TX	ASN	L 32–35	3,529
October 3	3:00 pm	vs. No. 12 Sam Houston State		NRG Stadium; Houston, TX (Battle of the Piney Woods)	ESPN3	L 28–34	26,990
October 10	3:00 pm	Nicholls State		Homer Bryce Stadium; Nacogdoches, TX	ESPN3	W 28–24	5,523
October 17	7:00 pm	at No. 23 Southeastern Louisiana		Strawberry Stadium; Hammond, LA	FCS	W 28–27	7,037
October 31	3:00 pm	Incarnate Word^{†}		Homer Bryce Stadium; Nacogdoches, TX	ESPN3	W 55–21	4,814
November 7	3:00 pm	at Central Arkansas		Estes Stadium; Conway, AR	ESPN3	L 24–36	6,157
November 14	3:00 pm	Houston Baptist		Homer Bryce Stadium; Nacogdoches, TX	ESPN3	W 55–20	4,305
November 21	3:00 pm	at Northwestern State		Harry Turpin Stadium; Natchitoches, LA (Chief Caddo)	SLDN	L 17–33	6,147
*Non-conference game; ^{†}Homecoming; Rankings from STATS Poll released prior to the game; All times are in Central time

== Game summaries ==
=== Northern Arizona ===
Northern Arizona at Stephen F. Austin

Team	1	2	3	4	Total
• NAU Lumberjacks	10	10	7	7	34
#24 SFA Lumberjacks	7	7	0	14	28

- Date: September 5
- Location: Homer Bryce Stadium
  Nacogdoches, TX
- Game start: 6:00 PM CDT
- Elapsed time: 3:10
- Game attendance: 8,473
- Referee: Kevin Boitmann • Umpire: Rod Tucker • Linesman: Brett Basce • Line judge: Matt Mount • Back judge: Brendon Barnes • Field judge: John Teague • Side judge: Andy Lebo
- Television network: ESPN3

Scoring summary
1	12:45	Northern Arizona	Emmanuel Butler 57 yard pass from Case Cookus (Ryan Hawkins kick), Drive: 6 plays, 75 yards, 2:15	0–7
1	6:01	Northern Arizona	Ryan Hawkins 26 yard field goal, Drive: 6 plays, 70 yards, 2:00	0–10
1	0:49	Stephen F. Austin	Zach Conque 1 yard run (Mason Juhl kick), Drive: 13 plays, 71 yards, 5:06	7–10
2	14:40	Northern Arizona	Emmanuel Butler 47 yard pass from Case Cookus (Ryan Hawkins kick), Drive: 3 plays, 74 yards, 1:03	7–17
2	10:20	Stephen F. Austin	Fred Ford 6 yard run (Mason Juhl kick), Drive: 12 plays, 75 yards, 4:20	14–17
2	5:24	Northern Arizona	Ryan Hawkins 25 yard field goal, Drive: 13 plays, 50 yards, 4:46	14–20
3	7:09	Northern Arizona	Case Cookus 11 yard run (Ryan Hawkins kick), Drive: 7 plays, 68 yards, 3:12	14–27
4	8:48	Northern Arizona	Emmanuel Butler 36 yard pass from Alex Holmes (Ryan Hawkins kick), Drive: 4 plays, 73 yards, 2:10	14–34
4	6:04	Stephen F. Austin	Justice Liggins 19 yard pass from Zach Conque (Mason Juhl kick), Drive: 9 plays, 88 yards, 2:36	21–34
4	2:54	Stephen F. Austin	Zach Conque 10 yard run (Mason Juhl kick), Drive: 7 plays, 66 yards, 2:15	28–34

=== @ TCU ===
Stephen F. Austin at TCU

Team	1	2	3	4	Total
Lumberjacks	0	0	0	7	7
• Horned Frogs	21	14	21	14	70

- Date: September 12
- Location: Amon G. Carter Stadium
  Fort Worth, TX
- Game start: 2:30 PM CDT
- Elapsed time: 3:13
- Game attendance: 45,786
- Game weather: 84°F • NE 9 • Sunny and clear
- Referee: Scott Campbell • Umpire: M. Henderson • Linesman: Greg Downum • Line judge: Steve Hoslett • Back judge: Dave Baldwin • Field judge: Robert Asel • Side judge: Dave Curschman • Center judge: Darren Winkley
- TV announcers (FS1): Joe Davis (play-by-play), Brady Quinn (color), Kris Budden (sideline)

Scoring summary
1	6:51	TCU	Aaron Green 2 yard run (Jaden Oberkrom kick), Drive: 8 plays, 93 yards, 1:56	0–7
1	3:40	TCU	Aaron Green 7 yard run (Jaden Oberkrom kick), Drive: 4 plays, 30 yards, 0:54	0–14
1	1:57	TCU	Kolby Listenbee 60 yard pass from Trevone Boykin (Jaden Oberkrom kick), Drive: 1 play, 60 yards, 0:09	0–21
2	13:27	TCU	KaVontae Turpin 6 yard pass from Trevone Boykin (Jaden Oberkrom kick), Drive: 6 plays, 36 yards, 1:33	0–28
2	11:34	TCU	Ja'Juan Story 9 yard pass from Trevone Boykin (Jaden Oberkrom kick), Drive: 3 plays, 29 yards, 0:44	0–35
3	11:23	TCU	Emanuel Porter 3 yard pass from Trevone Boykin (Jaden Oberkrom kick),Drive: 9 plays, 65 yards, 3:37	0–42
3	9:37	TCU	Denzel Johnson 50 yard interception return (Jaden Oberkrom kick), Drive: 5 plays, 15 yards, 1:46	0–49
3	9:37	TCU	Kyle Hicks 1 yard run (Jaden Oberkrom kick), Drive: 3 plays, 67 yards, 1:07	0–56
4	14:25	TCU	Jaelan Austin 16 yard pass from Bram Kohlhausen (Jaden Oberkrom kick), Drive: 5 plays, 40 yards, 1:46	0–63
4	14:02	Stephen F. Austin	Loren Easly 75 yard run (Nick Bruno kick), Drive: 1 play, 75 yards, 0:23	7–63
4	4:02	TCU	Colten Christensen 3 yard run (Jonathan Song kick), Drive: 16 plays, 75 yards, 10:00	7–70

=== McNeese State ===
McNeese State at Stephen F. Austin

Team	1	2	3	4	Total
• Cowboys	7	14	0	7	28
Lumberjacks	14	0	0	0	14

- Date: September 19
- Location: Homer Bryce Stadium
  Nacogdoches, TX
- Game start: 6:00 PM CDT
- Elapsed time: 3:25
- Game attendance: 12,018
- Game weather: 85–89°F • SE 0–5 • Sunny and clear
- Referee: Brandon Cruse • Umpire: Apollo Martin • Linesman: Brad Edwards • Line judge: Derek Anderson • Back judge: Daniel Young • Field judge: Gabriel DeLeon • Side judge: Mark Graves
- Television network: ESPN3

Scoring summary
1	11:15	McNeese St	Wallace Scott 97 yard fumble return (Trent Manuel kick), Drive: 5 plays, 77 yards, 2:25	0–7
1	8:43	Stephen F. Austin	Aaron Thomas 14 yard pass from Hunter Taylor, Nick Bruno Kick; 6 plays, 79 yards, 0:00	7–7
1	1:35	Stephen F. Austin	Braxton Bearden 55 yard pass from Hunter Taylor (Nick Bruno kick), Drive: 3 plays, 57 yards, 1:28	14–7
2	10:17	McNeese St	David Bush 22 yard pass from Daniel Sams (Trent Manuel kick), Drive: 13 plays, 75 yards, 6:13	14–14
2	5:11	McNeese St	Kent Shelby 5 yard pass from Grant Ashcraft (Trent Manuel kick), Drive: 10 plays, 64 yards, 3:28	14–21
4	6:05	McNeese St	Daniel Sams 76 yard run (Trent Manuel kick), Drive: 3 plays, 80 yards, 1:33	14–28

=== @ Abilene Christian ===
Stephen F. Austin at Abilene Christian

Team	1	2	3	4	Total
Lumberjacks	6	6	7	13	32
• Wildcats	13	7	7	8	35

- Date: September 26
- Location: Shotwell Stadium
  Abilene, TX
- Game start: 6:00 PM CDT
- Elapsed time: 3:35
- Game attendance: 3,529
- Game weather: 79°F • E 2 • Partly cloudy
- Referee: Kevin Hassell • Umpire: Rod Tucker • Linesman: Brett Bascue • Line judge: Matt Mount • Back judge: Brandon Barnes • Field judge: Keith Claiborne • Side judge: Andy Lebo
- Television network: ASN

Scoring summary
1	11:49	Abilene Christian	Cedric Gilbert 23 yard pass from Parker McKenzie (Zach Lehr kick failed), Drive: 7 plays, 64 yards, 3:11	0–6
1	3:58	Abilene Christian	De'Andre Brown 2 yard run (Sam Lawlis kick), Drive: 10 play, 79 yards, 4:30	0–13
1	0:50	Stephen F. Austin	Zach Conque 1 yard run (Nick Bruno kick failed), Drive: 8 plays, 65 yards, 3:08	6–13
2	5:32	Abilene Christian	Cedric Gilbert 55 yard pass from Parker McKenzie (Zach Lehr kick), Drive: 6 plays, 77 yards, 1:27	6–20
2	0:01	Stephen F. Austin	Aaron Piper 13 yard pass from Zach Conque (Mason Juhl kick failed), Drive: 10 plays, 97 yards, 1:35	12–20
3	8:57	Abilene Christian	De'Andre Brown 61 yard run (Zach Lehr kick), Drive: 6 plays, 61 yards, 3:10	12–27
3	5:41	Stephen F. Austin	Justice Liggins 38 yard pass from Zach Conque (Mason Juhl kick), Drive: 9 plays, 71 yards, 3:10	19–27
4	13:17	Stephen F. Austin	Joshawa West 21 yard run (Mason Juhl kick), Drive: 9 plays, 67 yards, 4:25	26–27
4	10:48	Stephen F. Austin	Robert Sylvester 44 yard pass from Zach Conque (two-point run conv. failed), Drive: 4 plays, 40 yards, 1:17	32–27
4	5:59	Abilene Christian	De'Andre Brown 20 yard run (Parker McKenzie pass to Byron Proctor for two-point conv.), Drive: 11 plays, 75 yards, 4:49	32–35

=== Sam Houston State ===
Battle of the Piney Woods

Team	1	2	3	4	Total
Lumberjacks	0	14	7	7	28
• #12 Bearkats	0	3	21	10	34

- Date: October 3
- Location: NRG Stadium
  Houston, TX
- Game start: 3:00 PM CDT
- Elapsed time: 3:32
- Game attendance: 26,990
- Game weather: 72°F • Calm • Indoors
- Referee: Ross Smith • Umpire: Mark Warner • Linesman: Justin Gragg • Line judge: Todd Allen • Back judge: Alvin Moore • Field judge: Danny Hoeft • Side judge: Scotty Melancon
- TV announcers (ESPN3): Randy McIlvoy, Shea Walker, Brooke Bentley

Scoring summary
2	14:54	Stephen F. Austin	De'Quan 21 pass from Zach Conque (Mason Juhl kick), Drive: 6 plays, 61 yards, 2:04	7–0
2	5:40	Sam Houston State	Luc Swimberghe 35 yard field goal, Drive: 10 plays, 58 yards, 3:15	7–3
2	4:10	Stephen F. Austin	Judah Jones 31 yard pass from Conque (Mason Juhl kick), Drive: 4 plays, 56 yards, 1:30	14–3
3	13:14	Sam Houston State	Gerald Thomas 78 yard punt return (Luc Swimberghe kick), Drive: 3 plays, 6 yards, 1:46	14–10
3	9:16	Sam Houston State	Donavan Williams 4 yard run (Luc Swimberghe kick), Drive: 10 plays, 70 yards, 2:27	14–17
3	5:41	Stephen F. Austin	Conque 1 yard run (Mason Juhl kick), Drive: 10 plays, 79 yards, 3:35	21–17
3	3:01	Sam Houston State	Yedidiah Louis 53 yard punt return (Luc Swimberghe kick), Drive: 3 plays, 3 yards, 1:06	21–24
4	13:12	Sam Houston State	Corey Avery 1 yard run (Luc Swimberghe kick), Drive: 14 plays, 87 yards, 3:22	21–31
4	10:39	Stephen F. Austin	Loren Easly 80 yard run (Mason Juhl kick), Drive: 1 play, 80 yards, 0:14	28–31
4	6:34	Sam Houston State	Luc Swimberghe 32 yard field goal, Drive: 10 plays, 56 yards, 4:05	28–34

=== Nicholls ===
Nicholls at Stephen F. Austin

Team	1	2	3	4	Total
Colonels	14	7	0	3	24
• Lumberjacks	7	0	7	14	28

- Date: October 10
- Location: Homer Bryce Stadium
  Nacogdoches, TX
- Game start: 3:00 PM CDT
- Elapsed time: 3:06
- Game attendance: 5,523
- Game weather: Mid 80s • N 5 • Sunny and nice
- Referee: Dan Lewis • Umpire: Rod Tucker • Linesman: Brett Bascue • Line judge: Matt Mount • Back judge: Brendon Barnes • Field judge: Jon Teague • Side judge: Henry Howard
- Television network: ESPN3

Scoring summary
1	14:36	Nicholls	Tuskani Figaro 30 yard run (Francisco Condado kick), Drive: 2 plays, 75 yards, 0:24	0–7
1	6:35	Nicholls	Michael Henry 3 yard run (Francisco Condado kick), Drive: 8 plays, 77 yards, 3:08	0–14
1	0:44	Stephen F. Austin	Justice Liggins 22 yard pass from Zach Conque (Mason Juhl kick), Drive: 4 plays, 44 yards, 1:56	7–14
2	10:04	Nicholls	Darryl Watson 8 yard pass from Tuskani Figaro (Francisco Condado kick), Drive: 12 plays, 85 yards, 5:36	7–21
3	8:16	Stephen F. Austin	Loren Easly 3 yard run (Mason Juhl kick), Drive: 10 plays, 94 yards, 5:09	14–21
4	10:50	Nicholls	Francisco Condado 32 yard field goal, Drive: 8 plays, 65 yards, 4:07	14–24
4	9:14	Stephen F. Austin	Zach Conque 18 yard run (Mason Juhl kick), Drive: 4 plays, 66 yards, 1:29	21–24
4	0:26	Stephen F. Austin	Zach Conque 1 yard run (Mason Juhl kick), Drive: 13 plays, 84 yards, 6:09	28–24

=== @ Southeastern Louisiana ===
Stephen F. Austin at Southeastern Louisiana

Team	1	2	3	4	Total
• Lumberjacks	0	14	7	7	28
#23 Lions	13	7	7	0	27

- Date: October 17
- Location: Strawberry Stadium
  Hammond, LA
- Game start: 7:00 PM CDT
- Elapsed time: 3:22
- Game attendance: 7,037
- Referee: Kevin Hassell • Umpire: Rod Tucker • Linesman: Bret Bascue • Line judge: Matt Mount • Back judge: Brendon Barnes • Field judge: John Teague • Side judge: Bill Stimmel
- Television network: FCS

Scoring summary
1	8:39	Southeastern Louisiana	Tre' Bennett 49 yard fumble return (Jonathon Tatum kick), Drive: 3 plays, -15 yards, 1:28	0–7
1	4:48	Southeastern Louisiana	Byron Johnson 76 yard pass from D'Shaie Landor (Jonathon Tatum kick blocked), Drive: 3 plays, 80 yards, 1:26	0–13
2	14:26	Southeastern Louisiana	Chris Briggs 26 yard pass from D'Shaie Landor (Jonathon Tatum kick), Drive: 6 plays, 80 yards, 2:12	0–20
2	2:41	Stephen F. Austin	Braxton Bearden 14 yard pass from Hunter Taylor (Mason Juhl kick), Drive: 3 plays, 67 yards, 0:54	7–20
2	0:02	Stephen F. Austin	De'Quann Ruffin 34 yard pass from Hunter Taylor (Mason Juhl kick), Drive: 4 plays, 59 yards, 0:22	14–20
3	12:58	Southeastern Louisiana	Julius Maraclin 63 yard run (Jonathon Tatum kick), Drive: 4 plays, 74 yards, 1:57	14–27
3	5:30	Stephen F. Austin	De'Quann Ruffin 13 yard pass from Hunter Taylor (Mason Juhl kick), Drive: 9 plays, 96 yards, 3:30	21–27
4	0:38	Stephen F. Austin	Zach Conque 1 yard run (Mason Juhl kick), Drive: 16 plays, 72 yards, 5:00	28–27

=== Incarnate Word ===
Incarnate Word at Stephen F. Austin

Team	1	2	3	4	Total
Cardinals	7	7	7	0	21
• Lumberjacks	7	20	14	14	55

- Date: October 31
- Location: Homer Bryce Stadium
  Nacogdoches, TX
- Game start: 3:00 PM CDT
- Elapsed time: 3:15
- Game attendance: 4,814
- Game weather: Mid 60s • S 5–7 • Cloudy, misty
- Referee: Kevin Boitmann • Umpire: Bryan Liles • Linesman: Stephen Hurley • Line judge: Ben Tenpenny • Back judge: Chris Bailey • Field judge: Tom Maes • Side judge: Joe Conte
- Television network: ESPN3

Scoring summary
1	4:01	Stephen F. Austin	Loren Easly 41 yard run (Mason Juhl kick); Drive: 5 plays, 76 yards, 2:04	7–0
1	0:22	Incarnate Word	Jordan Hicks 36 yard pass from Trent Brittain (Cody Seidel kick); Drive: 7 plays, 77 yards, 3:34	7–7
2	11:55	Stephen F. Austin	Mason Juhl 25 yard field goal, Drive: 8 plays, 58 yards, 3:20	10–7
2	7:00	Stephen F. Austin	Judah Jones 9 yard pass from Zach Conque (Mason Juhl kick), Drive: 7 plays, 39 yards, 3:09	17–7
2	3:54	Stephen F. Austin	Aaron Piper 66 yard pass from Zach Conque (Mason Juhl kick), Drive: 3 plays, 71 yards, 1:28	24–7
2	0:36	Incarnate Word	Sean Flannel 4 yard run, (Cody Seidel kick), Drive: 2 plays, 5 yards, 0:42	24–14
2	0:00	Stephen F. Austin	Mason Juhl 48 yard field goal, Drive: 6 plays, 19 yards, 0:28	27–14
3	14:46	Incarnate Word	Kody Edwards 100 yard kickoff return (Cody Seidel kick), Drive: 0 plays, 0 yards, 0:00	27–21
3	10:30	Stephen F. Austin	Tre Rosser 47 yard fumble recovery (Mason Juhl kick), Drive: 3 plays, 17 yards, 1:14	34–21
3	6:07	Stephen F. Austin	Aaron Piper 26 yard pass from Zach Conque (Mason Juhl kick), Drive: 9 plays, 73 yards, 3:15	41–21
4	9:27	Stephen F. Austin	De'Quan Ruffin 29 yard pass from Zach Conque (Mason Juhl kick), Drive: 11 plays, 58 yards, 5:24	48–21
4	1:00	Stephen F. Austin	Marlon Walls 13 yard interception return (Mason Juhl kick), Drive: 3 plays, 0 yards, 0:53	55–21

=== @ Central Arkansas ===
Stephen F. Austin at Central Arkansas

Team	1	2	3	4	Total
Lumberjacks	0	13	11	0	24
• Bears	10	7	12	7	36

- Date: November 7
- Location: Estes Stadium
  Conway, AR
- Game start: 3:00 PM CST
- Elapsed time: 2:26
- Game attendance: 6,157
- Referee: M. Defee • Umpire: R. Richeson • Linesman: A. Green • Line judge: Q. Givens • Back judge: J. Blubaugh • Field judge: L. van Pham • Side judge: M. Defee

Scoring summary
1	6:30	Central Arkansas	Jace Denker 32 yard field goal, Drive: 15 plays, 61 yards, 6:17	0–3
1	4:42	Central Arkansas	Jeff Anderson 55 yard run (Jace Denker kick), Drive: 1 play, 55 yards, 0:11	0–10
2	14:55	Stephen F. Austin	Mason Juhl 33 yard field goal, Drive: 12 plays, 61 yards, 4:45	3–10
2	12:37	Stephen F. Austin	Zach Conque 1 yard run (Mason Juhl kick), Drive: 6 plays, 18 yards, 2:14	10–10
2	7:04	Stephen F. Austin	Mason Juhl 27 yard field goal, Drive: 7 plays, 11 yards, 1:51	13–10
2	2:10	Central Arkansas	Blake Veasley 1 yard run (Jace Denker kick), Drive: 12 plays, 61 yards, 4:17	13–17
3	12:34	Stephen F. Austin	Mason Juhl 25 yard field goal, Drive: 6 plays, 59 yards, 2:21	16–17
3	3:28	Stephen F. Austin	Joshawa West 45 yard pass from Zach Conque (Zach Conque run for two-point conv.), Drive: 4 plays, 80 yards, 1:34	24–17
3	2:24	Central Arkansas	Jatavious Wilson 38 yard pass from Hayden Hildebrand (Jace Denker kick blocked), Drive: 3 plays, 67 yards, 1:03	24–23
3	1:08	Central Arkansas	Kelton Warren 37 yard run (two-point conv. failed), Drive: 3 plays, 52 yards, 1:14	24–29
4	9:54	Central Arkansas	Kelton Warren 21 yard run (Jace Denker kick), Drive: 10 plays, 91 yards, 4:27	24–36

=== Houston Baptist ===
Houston Baptist at Stephen F. Austin

Team	1	2	3	4	Total
Huskies	7	3	3	7	20
• Lumberjacks	7	13	28	7	55

- Date: November 14
- Location: Homer Bryce Stadium
  Nacogdoches, TX
- Game start: 3:00 PM CST
- Elapsed time: 3:25
- Game attendance: 4,305
- Referee: M. Vanderville • Umpire: David Williams • Linesman: Eric Camouche • Line judge: Todd Allen • Back judge: James Boyd • Field judge: B. Furqueron • Side judge: David Shields
- Television network: ESPN3

Scoring summary
1	10:58	Stephen F. Austin	Judah Jones 10 yard pass from Zach Conque (Mason Juhl kick), Drive: 7 plays, 72 yards, 2:47	7–0
1	2:14	Houston Baptist	Mev Adjin 28 yard pass from Max Staver (Travis Shinn kick), Drive: 5 plays, 72 yards, 1:38	7–7
2	14:01	Stephen F. Austin	Mason Juhl 38 yard field goal, Drive: 10 plays, 57 yards, 3:07	10–7
2	9:12	Stephen F. Austin	Mason Juhl 39 yard field goal, Drive: 7 plays, 39 yards, 2:10	13–7
2	4:10	Stephen F. Austin	Justic Liggins 8 yard pass from Zach Conque (Mason Juhl kick), Drive: 8 plays, 46 yards, 2:58	20–7
2	0:47	Houston Baptist	Travis Shinn 27 yard field goal, Drive: 8 plays, 55 yards, 3:23	20–10
3	11:33	Stephen F. Austin	Zach Conque 1 yard run (Mason Juhl kick), Drive: 9 plays, 90 yards, 3:19	27–10
3	8:59	Houston Baptist	Travis Shinn 42 yard field goal, Drive: 6 plays, 39 yards, 2:28	27–13
3	7:18	Stephen F. Austin	Zach Conque 40 yard run (Mason Juhl kick), Drive: 4 plays, 74 yards, 1:36	34–13
3	4:23	Stephen F. Austin	Aaron Piper 34 yard pass from Zach Conque (Mason Juhl kick), Drive: 4 plays, 59 yards, 1:37	41–13
3	0:44	Stephen F. Austin	Jacol Whitaker 8 yard run (Mason Juhl kick), Drive: 5 plays, 65 yards, 2:28	48–13
4	12:26	Stephen F. Austin	Trevon Smith 32 yard interception return (Mason Juhl kick), Drive: 1 plays, 0 yards, 0:09	55–13
4	8:50	Houston Baptist	Ricard Barnett 28 yard pass from Jonath Fleming (Travis Shinn kick), Drive: 8 plays, 65 yards, 3:36	55–20

=== @ Northwestern State ===
Stephen F. Austin at Northwestern State

Team	1	2	3	4	Total
Lumberjacks	7	7	3	0	17
• Demons	0	17	10	6	33

- Date: November 21
- Location: Harry Turpin Stadium
  Natchitoches, LA
- Game start: 3:00 PM CST
- Elapsed time: 3:20
- Game attendance: 6,147
- Game weather: 64°F • N 7 • Overcast and mild
- Referee: Kevin Hassell • Umpire: Rod Tucker • Linesman: Brett Bascus • Line judge: Matt Mount • Back judge: Brendan Barnes • Field judge: John Teague • Side judge: Buddy Furqueron

Scoring summary
1	12:45	Stephen F. Austin	Aaron Piper 40 yard pass from Zach Conque (Mason Juhl kick), Drive: 7 plays, 75 yards, 2:15	7–0
2	9:12	Northwestern State	Chris Moore 32 yard field goal, Drive: 6 plays, 47 yards, 2:03	7–3
2	8:23	Northwestern State	Lero Armstrong 18 yard interception return (Chris Moore kick), Drive: 2 plays, 3 yards, 0:43	7–10
2	6:55	Northwestern State	Daniel Taylor 45 yard run (Chris Moore kick), Drive: 1 play, 60 yards, 0:18	7–17
2	0:17	Stephen F. Austin	Zach Conque 2 yard run (Mason Juhl kick), Drive: 5 plays, 49 yards, 0:36	14–17
3	9:31	Northwestern State	Zach White 55 yard pass from Stephen Rivers (Chris Moore kick), Drive: 3 plays, 77 yards, 1:18	14–24
3	5:16	Northwestern State	Chris Moore 38 yard field goal, Drive: 6 plays, 21 yards, 2:57	14–27
3	0:34	Stephen F. Austin	Mason Juhl 33 yard field goal, Drive: 5 plays, 19 yards, 1:42	17–27
4	11:13	Northwestern State	Chris Moore 32 yard field goal, Drive: 10 plays, 57 yards, 4:15	17–30
4	3:02	Northwestern State	Chris Moore 37 yard field goal, Drive: 13 plays, 59 yards, 6:45	17–33

== Ranking movements ==
Ranking movements Legend: ██ Increase in ranking ██ Decrease in ranking — = Not ranked RV = Received votes
	Week													
Poll	Pre	1	2	3	4	5	6	7	8	9	10	11	12	Final
STATS FCS	24	RV	RV	—	—	—	—	—	—	—	—	—	—	
Coaches	RV	—	—	—	—	—	—	—	—	—	—	—	—	
