= 2015 Southeastern Louisiana Lions football team =

American college football season

2015 Southeastern Louisiana Lions football
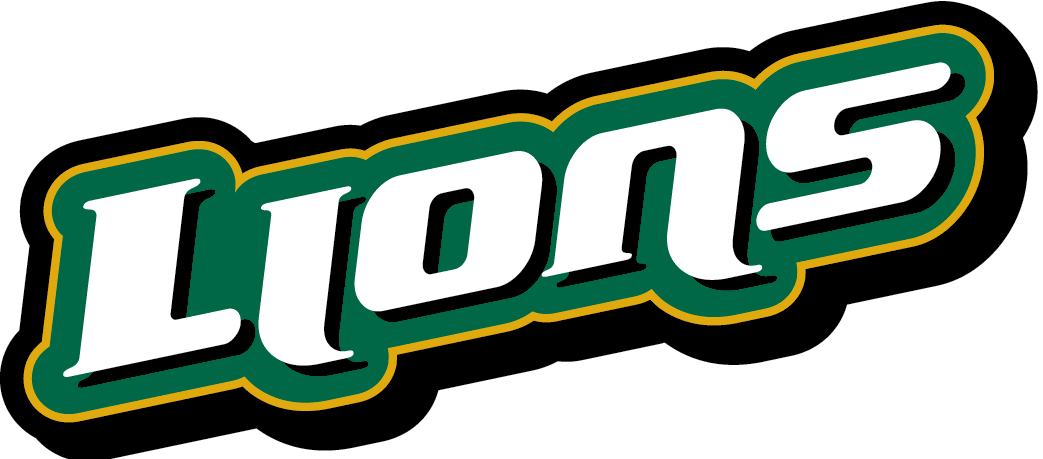
- Conference: Southland Conference
- Record: 4–7 (3–6 Southland)
- Head coach: Ron Roberts (4th season)
- Offensive coordinator: Chet Pobolish (2nd season)
- Home stadium: Strawberry Stadium

2015 Southland Conference football standings
	Conf.			Overall
Team	W		L	W		L
No. 7 McNeese State $^	9	–	0	10	–	1
No. 3 Sam Houston State ^	7	–	2	11	–	4
Central Arkansas	7	–	2	7	–	4
Incarnate Word *	5	–	4	6	–	5
Lamar	4	–	5	5	–	6
Northwestern State	4	–	5	4	–	7
Stephen F. Austin	4	–	5	4	–	7
SE Louisiana	3	–	6	4	–	7
Abilene Christian *	3	–	6	3	–	8
Nicholls State	3	–	6	3	–	8
Houston Baptist	0	–	8	2	–	9
$ – Conference champion; ^ – FCS playoff participant; * – ineligible for FCS playoffs due to transition from NCAA Division II; Rankings from STATS poll

The 2015 Southeastern Louisiana Lions football team represented Southeastern Louisiana University in the 2015 NCAA Division I FCS football season. The Lions were led by fourth-year head coach Ron Roberts and played their home games at Strawberry Stadium. They were a member of the Southland Conference. They finished the season 4–7, 3–6 in Southland play to finish in a three way tie for eighth place.

== Schedule ==
Date	Time	Opponent	Rank	Site	TV	Result	Attendance
September 3	6:00 pm	at Northwestern State	No. 19	Harry Turpin Stadium; Natchitoches, LA	ASN	W 34–20	10,621
September 12	7:00 pm	Florida Tech*	No. 20	Strawberry Stadium; Hammond, LA		W 28–17	7,759
September 19	1:00 pm	at Ohio*	No. 20	Peden Stadium; Athens, OH	ESPN3	L 14–35	22,985
October 1	6:00 pm	Lamar	No. 22	Strawberry Stadium; Hammond, LA	ASN	W 30–27	4,520
October 10	6:00 pm	at No. 22 McNeese State	No. 20	Cowboy Stadium; Lake Charles, LA	CST	L 7–21	13,110
October 17	7:00 pm	Stephen F. Austin^{†}	No. 23	Strawberry Stadium; Hammond, LA	FCS	L 27–28	7,037
October 24	2:00 pm	at Houston Baptist		Husky Stadium; Houston, TX		W 22–7	1,730
October 31	7:00 pm	at Central Arkansas		Estes Stadium; Conway, AR	ESPN3	L 16–21	7,427
November 7	7:00 pm	Incarnate Word		Strawberry Stadium; Hammond, LA	CST	L 2–16	3,474
November 14	2:00 pm	at Abilene Christian		Shotwell Stadium; Abilene, TX		L 17–21	2,500
November 19	6:00 pm	Nicholls State		Strawberry Stadium; Hammond, LA (River Bell Classic)	ASN	L 24–27	5,491
*Non-conference game; ^{†}Homecoming; Rankings from STATS Poll released prior to the game; All times are in Central time

== Game summaries ==
=== @ Northwestern State ===
Southeastern Louisiana at Northwestern State

Team	1	2	3	4	Total
• #19 Lions	6	7	13	8	34
Demons	3	3	7	7	20

- Date: September 1
- Location: Harry Turpin Stadium
  Natchitoches, LA
- Game start: 6:00 PM CDT
- Elapsed time: 3:32
- Game attendance: 10,621
- Game weather: 93 °F (34 °C) • N 1 • Humid and sticky
- Referee: Ross Smith
- Television network: ASN

Scoring summary
1	13:01	Northwestern State	Chris Moore 37 yard field goal, Drive: 4 plays, 5 yards, 1:07	0–3
1	1:42	Southeastern Louisiana	Xavier Roberson 1 yard run (Jonathon Tatum kick failed), Drive: 10 plays, 80 yards, 4:58	6–3
2	12:26	Northwestern State	Chris Moore 46 yard field goal, Drive: 8 plays, 48 yards, 4:11	6–6
2	0:43	Southeastern Louisiana	Jeff Smiley 12 yard run (Jonathon Tatum kick), Drive: 11 plays, 77 yards, 5:43	13–6
3	9:58	Southeastern Louisiana	Kody Sutton 2 yard run (Jonathon Tatum kick failed), Drive: 5 plays, 69 yards, 1:57	19–6
3	6:03	Southeastern Louisiana	D'Shaie Landor 81 yard run (Jonathon Tatum kick), Drive: 3 plays, 89 yards, 0:54	26–6
3	3:16	Northwestern State	Daniel Taylor 27 yard run (Chris Moore kick), Drive: 7 plays, 87 yards, 2:42	26–13
4	8:53	Northwestern State	Joel Blumenthal 44 yard pass complete to Shakeir Ryan (Chris Moore kick), Drive: 5 plays, 64 yards, 2:44	26–20
4	1:01	Southeastern Louisiana	Kody Sutton 3 yard run (D'Shaie Landor pass to Jeff Smiley for two-point conv.), Drive: 16 plays, 75 yards, 7:48	34–20

=== Florida Tech ===
Florida Tech at Southeastern Louisiana

Team	1	2	3	4	Total
Panthers	10	7	0	0	17
• #20 Lions	14	0	0	14	28

- Date: September 12
- Location: Strawberry Stadium
  Hammond, LA
- Game start: 7:00 PM CDT
- Elapsed time: 3:34
- Game attendance: 7,759
- Game weather: 82°F • NNW 6 • Sunny
- Referee: Michael VanderVelde

Scoring summary
1	10:34	Southeastern Louisiana	Solomon Parker 7 yard fumble recovery (Jonathan Tatum kick), Drive: 2 plays, -18 yards, 0:33	7–0
1	5:44	Southeastern Louisiana	Ashton Henderson 45 yard fumble recovery (Jonathan Tatum kick), Drive: 6 plays, 16 yards, 2:02	14–0
1	4:30	Florida Tech	Drake Hillman 44 yard field goal, Drive: 5 plays, 36 yards, 1:05	14–3
1	0:33	Florida Tech	Kenny Johnston 59 yard pass from Sean Ashley (Drake Hillman kick) Drive: 3 plays, 65 yards, 1:16	14–10
2	9:29	Florida Tech	Josh Denton 1 yard run (Drake Hillman kick), Drive: 8 plays, 85 yards, 2:50	14–17
4	13:09	Southeastern Louisiana	Xavier Roberson 2 yard run (Jonathan Tatum kick), Drive: 13 plays, 77 yards, 6:26	21–17
4	11:49	Southeastern Louisiana	Demareyeh Lane 58 yard interception (Jonathan Tatum kick), Drive: 4 plays, 34 yards, 1:20	28–17

=== @ Ohio ===
Southeastern Louisiana at Ohio

Team	1	2	3	4	Total
#20 Lions	0	0	7	7	14
• Bobcats	7	14	0	14	35

- Date: September 19
- Location: Peden Stadium
  Athens, OH
- Game start: 1:00 CDT
- Elapsed time: 4:16
- Game attendance: 22,985
- Game weather: 82°F • SW 7 • Overcast
- Referee: Tom Stapleton
- Television network: ESPN3

Scoring summary
1	6:57	Ohio	Dazmond Patterson 3 yard run (Josiah Yazdani kick), Drive: 2 plays, 56 yards, 0:49	0–7
2	9:40	Ohio	Papi White 10 yard run (Josiah Yazdani kick), Drive: 5 plays, 68 yards, 1:38	0–14
2	2:47	Ohio	Sebastian Smith 31 yard pass from Derrius Vick (Josiah Yazdani kick), Drive: 11 plays, 57 yards, 5:12	0–21
3	4:15	Southeastern Louisiana	Jeff Smiley 10 yard pass from Donovan Isom (Jonathan Tatum kick), Drive: 7 plays, 48 yards, 1:56	7–21
4	11:01	Southeastern Louisiana	Dylan Bossier 38 yard pass from Donovan Isom (Jonathan Tatum kick), Drive: 11 plays, 85 yards, 5:58	14–21
4	10:44	Ohio	White, Papi 58 yard run (Josiah Yazdani kick), Drive: 1 play, 58 yards, 0:11	14–28
4	6:21	Ohio	Cope, Brendan 67 yard pass from Derrius Vick (Josiah Yazdani kick), Drive: 3 plays, 75 yards, 1:44	14–35

=== Lamar ===
Lamar at Southeastern Louisiana

Team	1	2	3	4	Total
Cardinals	0	14	10	3	27
• #22 Lions	13	0	10	7	30

- Date: October 1
- Location: Strawberry Stadium
  Hammond, LA
- Game start: 6:00 PM CDT
- Elapsed time: 3:32
- Game attendance: 4,520
- Game weather: 84°F • NNW 10 • Clear
- Referee: Kevin Hassell
- TV announcers (ASN): Lyn Rollins (Play-by-Play), Rene Nadeau (Analyst), Chris Mycoskie (Sideline)

Scoring summary
1	12:59	Southeastern Louisiana	D'Shaie Landor 67 yard pass complete to Jeff Smiley (Jonathon Tatum kick), Drive: 3 plays, 69 yards, 1:22	7–0
1	1:14	Southeastern Louisiana	D'Shaie Landor 5 yard run (Jonathon Tatum kick failed), Drive: 9 plays, 95 yards, 4:42	13–0
2	10:40	Lamar	Carson Earp 26 yard pass complete to Reggie Begelton (Alex Ball kick), Drive: 6 plays, 80 yards, 1:50	13–7
2	5:05	Lamar	Kade Harrington 3 yard run (Alex Ball kick), Drive: 3 plays, 65 yards, 0:48	13–14
3	11:27	Lamar	Alex Ball 20 yard field goal, Drive: 5 plays, 23 yards, 1:58	13–17
3	5:53	Southeastern Louisiana	Jonathon Tatum 40 yard field goal, Drive: 10 plays, 52 yards, 5:34	16–17
3	5:41	Lamar	Rodney Randle 87 yard punt return (Alex Ball kick), Drive: 0 plays, 0 yards, 0:00	16–24
3	2:37	Southeastern Louisiana	D'Shaie Landor 5 yard run (Jonathon Tatum kick), Drive: 6 plays, 41 yards, 2:54	23–24
4	8:00	Lamar	Alex Ball 20 yard field goal, Drive: 13 plays, 70 yards, 4:53	23–27
4	1:19	Southeastern Louisiana	Kody Sutton 1 yard run (Jonathon Tatum kick), Drive: 17 plays, 79 yards, 6:36	30–27

=== @ McNeese State ===
Southeastern Louisiana at McNeese State

Team	1	2	3	4	Total
#20 Lions	0	7	0	0	7
• #22 Cowboys	14	7	0	0	21

- Date: October 10
- Location: Cowboy Stadium
  Lake Charles, LA
- Game start: 6:00 PM CDT
- Elapsed time: 3:13
- Game attendance: 13,110
- Game weather: 80°F • NNW 6 • Sunny and Warm
- Referee: Ross Smith
- Television network: CST

Scoring summary
1	9:57	McNeese State	Daniel Sams 3 yard run (Trent Manuel kick), Drive: 10 plays, 86 yards, 5:03	0–7
1	5:00	McNeese State	Ryan Ross 58 yard run, (Trent Manuel kick), Drive: 7 plays, 94 yards, 3:19	0–14
2	13:08	Southeastern Louisiana	Xavier Roberson 1 yard run (Jonathon Tatum kick), Drive: 3 plays, 57 yards, 1:04	7–14
2	1:27	McNeese State	Ryan Ross 4 yard run, (Trent Manuel kick), Drive: 8 plays, 69 yards, 3:39	7–21

=== Stephen F. Austin ===
Stephen F. Austin at Southeastern Louisiana

Team	1	2	3	4	Total
• Lumberjacks	0	14	7	7	28
#23 Lions	13	7	7	0	27

- Date: October 17
- Location: Strawberry Stadium
  Hammond, LA
- Game start: 7:00 PM CDT
- Elapsed time: 3:22
- Game attendance: 7,037
- Referee: Kevin Hassell
- Television network: FCS

Scoring summary
1	8:39	Southeastern Louisiana	Tre' Bennett 49 yard fumble return (Jonathon Tatum kick), Drive: 3 plays, -15 yards, 1:28	7–0
1	4:48	Southeastern Louisiana	Byron Johnson 76 yard pass from D'Shaie Landor (Jonathon Tatum kick blocked), Drive: 3 plays, 80 yards, 1:26	13–0
2	14:26	Southeastern Louisiana	Chris Briggs 26 yard pass from D'Shaie Landor (Jonathon Tatum kick), Drive: 6 plays, 80 yards, 2:12	20–0
2	2:41	Stephen F. Austin	Braxton Bearden 14 yard pass from Hunter Taylor (Mason Juhl kick), Drive: 3 plays, 67 yards, 0:54	20–7
2	0:02	Stephen F. Austin	De'Quann Ruffin 34 yard pass from Hunter Taylor (Mason Juhl kick), Drive: 4 plays, 59 yards, 0:22	20–14
3	12:58	Southeastern Louisiana	Julius Maraclin 63 yard run (Jonathon Tatum kick), Drive: 4 plays, 74 yards, 1:57	27–14
3	5:30	Stephen F. Austin	De'Quann Ruffin 13 yard pass from Hunter Taylor (Mason Juhl kick), Drive: 9 plays, 96 yards, 3:30	27–21
4	0:38	Stephen F. Austin	Zach Conque 1 yard run (Mason Juhl kick), Drive: 16 plays, 72 yards, 5:00	27–28

=== @ Houston Baptist ===
Southeastern Louisiana at Houston Baptist

Team	1	2	3	4	Total
• Lions	9	7	0	6	22
Huskies	0	0	0	7	7

- Date: October 24
- Location: Husky Stadium
  Houston, TX
- Game start: 2:00 PM CDT
- Elapsed time: 2:20
- Game attendance: 1,730
- Referee: David Alvarez

Scoring summary
1	3:30	Southeastern Louisiana	Miki Fangatua Safety, Drive: 3 plays, -1 yard, 1:33	2–0
1	0:27	Southeastern Louisiana	Da'Quan Smith 10 yard pass from D'Shaie Landor (Jonathon Tatum kick), Drive: 6 plays, 43 yards, 2:55	9–0
2	0:58	Southeastern Louisiana	Trey Hallman 2 yard run (Jonathon Tatum kick), Drive: 5 plays, 80 yards, 1:17	16–0
4	9:24	Southeastern Louisiana	Julius Maraclin 5 yard run (Jonathon Tatum kick failed), Drive: 4 plays, 66 yards, 1:50	22–0
4	8:38	Houston Baptist	Terrance Peters 77 yard run (Travis Shinn kick), Drive: 2 plays, 83 yards, 0:40	22–7

=== @ Central Arkansas ===
Southeastern Louisiana at Central Arkansas

Team	1	2	3	4	Total
Lions	0	3	6	7	16
• Bears	7	7	0	7	21

- Date: October 31
- Location: Estes Stadium
  Conway, AR
- Game start: 7:00 PM CDT
- Elapsed time: 3:07
- Game attendance: 7,427
- Game weather: 60°F • Cloudy
- Referee: Mike Defee

Scoring summary
1	11:28	Central Arkansas	Blake Veasley 1 yard run (Jace Denker kick), Drive: 8 plays, 81 yards, 3:32	0–7
2	8:08	Southeastern Louisiana	Jonathon Tatum 25 yard field goal, Drive: 6 plays, 87 yards, 3:29	3–7
2	2:37	Central Arkansas	Kirk Baugh 10 yard run (Jace Denker kick), Drive: 4 plays, 40 yards, 1:25	3–14
3	12:06	Southeastern Louisiana	Jonathon Tatum 38 yard field goal, Drive: 9 plays, 48 yards, 2:46	6–14
3	5:58	Southeastern Louisiana	Jonathon Tatum 40 yard field goal, Drive: 5 plays, 71 yards, 2:31	9–14
4	14:18	Central Arkansas	Dominique Thomas 45 yard run (Jace Denker kick), Drive: 8 plays, 78 yards, 3:15	9–21
4	9:12	Southeastern Louisiana	Julius Maraclin 7 yard run (Jonathon Tatum kick), Drive: 3 plays, 52 yards, 1:18	16–21

=== Incarnate Word ===
Incarnate Word at Southeastern Louisiana

Team	1	2	3	4	Total
• Cardinals	7	3	6	0	16
Lions	0	2	0	0	2

- Date: November 7
- Location: Strawberry Stadium
  Hammond, LA
- Game start: 7:00 PM CST
- Elapsed time: 2:57
- Game attendance: 3,474
- Game weather: 70°F, Heavy Rain
- Referee: Marvel July
- Television network: ESPN3

Scoring summary
1	12:27	Incarnate Word	Sean Flannel 1 yard run (Cody Seidel kick), Drive: 2 plays, 3 yards, 0:38	0–7
2	13:01	Incarnate Word	Cody Seidel 29 yard field goal, Drive: 8 plays, 53 yards, 3:54	0–10
2	4:44	Southeastern Louisiana	Team Safety, Drive: 4 plays, -6 yards, 1:00	2–10
3	8:06	Incarnate Word	Trent Brittain 58 yard run (Cody Seidel kick blocked), Drive: 3 plays, 63 yards, 0:47	2–16

=== @ Abilene Christian ===
Southeastern Louisiana at Abilene Christian

Team	1	2	3	4	Total
Lions	0	7	3	7	17
• Wildcats	0	0	7	14	21

- Date: November 14
- Location: Shotwell Stadium
  Abilene, TX
- Game start: 2:00 PM CST
- Elapsed time: 3:07
- Game attendance: 2,500
- Game weather: 58°F • S 12 mph • Cloudy
- Referee: Kevin Hassell

Scoring summary
2	11:10	Southeastern Louisiana	D'Shaie Landor 2 yard run (Jonathon Tatum kick), Drive: 13 plays, 66 yards, 4:58	7–0
3	11:33	Abilene Christian	Herschel Sims 42 yard run (Zach Lehr kick), Drive: 4 plays, 68 yards, 1:46	7–7
3	2:31	Southeastern Louisiana	Jonathon Tatum 29 yard field goal, Drive: 12 plays, 68 yards, 5:59	10–7
4	14:54	Southeastern Louisiana	Chris Briggs 15 yard pass from D'Shaie Landor (Jonathon Tatum kick), Drive: 4 plays, 18 yards, 1:18	17–7
4	12:56	Abilene Christian	Monte Green-Avery 14 yard pass from Parker McKenzie (Zach Lehr kick), Drive: 5 plays, 75 yards, 2:03	17–14
4	0:22	Abilene Christian	Jamie Walker 1 yard pass from Parker McKenzie (Zach Lehr kick), Drive: 18 plays, 80 yards, 7:46	17–21

=== Nicholls ===
Nicholls at Southeastern Louisiana

Team	1	2	3	4	Total
• Colonels	0	3	14	10	27
Lions	7	10	0	7	24

- Date: November 21
- Location: Strawberry Stadium
  Hammond, LA
- Game start: 6:00 PM CST
- Elapsed time: 3:20
- Game attendance: 5,491
- Game weather: 64°F • Clear
- Referee: Ross Smith
- Television network: ASN

Scoring summary
1	9:31	Southeastern Louisiana	Micah Eugene 17 yard run (Jonathan Tatum kick), Drive: 5 plays, 52 yards, 2:13	7–0
2	9:31	Southeastern Louisiana	Jonathan Tatum 35 yard field goal, Drive: 12 plays, 49 yards, 4:43	10–0
2	9:31	Nicholls	Francisco Condado 45 yard field goal, Drive: 10 plays, 47 yards, 4:50	10–3
2	1:01	Southeastern Louisiana	Brandon Acker 28 yard pass from D'Shaie Landor (Jonathan Tatum kick), Drive: 5 plays, 52 yards, 1:37	17–3
3	13:14	Nicholls	Tobias Lofton 62 yard run (Francisco Condado kick), Drive: 4 plays, 75 yards, 1:46	17–10
3	9:06	Nicholls	Landry Klann 6 yard run (Francisco Condado kick), Drive: 8 plays, 61 yards, 3:06	17–17
4	14:51	Nicholls	Michael Henry 2 yard run (Francisco Condado kick), Drive: 10 plays, 91 yards, 4:20	17–24
4	0:59	Southeastern Louisiana	Brandon Acker 4 yard pass from D'Shaie Landor (Jonathan Tatum kick), Drive: 10 plays, 56 yards, 1:24	24–24
4	0:00	Nicholls	Francisco Condado 40 yard field goal, Drive:8 plays, 52 yards, 0:59	24–27

== Ranking movements ==
Ranking movements Legend: ██ Increase in ranking ██ Decrease in ranking — = Not ranked RV = Received votes
	Week													
Poll	Pre	1	2	3	4	5	6	7	8	9	10	11	12	Final
STATS FCS	19	20	20	23	22	20	23	RV	RV	RV	—	—	—	—
Coaches	19	18	17	19	19	17	21	RV	RV	—	—	—	—	—
