= 2015 Abilene Christian Wildcats football team =

American college football season

2015 Abilene Christian Wildcats football
- Conference: Southland Conference
- Record: 3–8 (3–6 Southland)
- Head coach: Ken Collums (4th season)
- Offensive coordinator: Nathan Young (3rd season)
- Offensive scheme: Spread
- Defensive coordinator: Darian Dulin (4th season)
- Base defense: 3–4
- Home stadium: Shotwell Stadium

2015 Southland Conference football standings
	Conf.			Overall
Team	W		L	W		L
No. 7 McNeese State $^	9	–	0	10	–	1
No. 3 Sam Houston State ^	7	–	2	11	–	4
Central Arkansas	7	–	2	7	–	4
Incarnate Word *	5	–	4	6	–	5
Lamar	4	–	5	5	–	6
Northwestern State	4	–	5	4	–	7
Stephen F. Austin	4	–	5	4	–	7
SE Louisiana	3	–	6	4	–	7
Abilene Christian *	3	–	6	3	–	8
Nicholls State	3	–	6	3	–	8
Houston Baptist	0	–	8	2	–	9
$ – Conference champion; ^ – FCS playoff participant; * – ineligible for FCS playoffs due to transition from NCAA Division II; Rankings from STATS poll

The 2015 Abilene Christian Wildcats football team represented Abilene Christian University in the 2015 NCAA Division I FCS football season. The Wildcats were in their third transition season of at the FCS level. They were led by fourth-year head coach Ken Collums. They play their home games at Shotwell Stadium. This was the Wildcats second season in the Southland Conference since their return to the conference. They finished the season 3–8, 3–6 in Southland play to finish in a three-way tie for eighth place.

== Schedule ==
Date	Time	Opponent	Site	TV	Result	Attendance
September 5	9:00 pm	at Fresno State*	Bulldog Stadium; Fresno, CA	MW Net	L 13–34	32,547
September 19	6:00 pm	Houston Baptist	Shotwell Stadium; Abilene, TX		W 49–21	7,327
September 26	2:30 pm	Stephen F. Austin	Shotwell Stadium; Abilene, TX	ASN	W 35–32	3,529
October 3	6:00 pm	at Central Arkansas	Estes Stadium; Conway, AR	ESPN3	L 14–42	9,427
October 10	7:00 pm	at Lamar	Provost Umphrey Stadium; Beaumont, TX	ESPN3	L 28–44	13,136
October 17	2:00 pm	No. 9 Sam Houston State^{†}	Shotwell Stadium; Abilene, TX	ASN	L 21–49	8,763
October 25	2:00 pm	at Incarnate Word	Gayle and Tom Benson Stadium; San Antonio, TX	ASN	L 20–25	3,175
October 31	2:00 pm	No. 10 McNeese State	Shotwell Stadium; Abilene, TX	ASN	L 13–15	3,567
November 7	6:00 pm	at Northwestern State	Harry Turpin Stadium; Natchitoches, LA		L 22–39	5,377
November 14	2:00 pm	Southeastern Louisiana	Shotwell Stadium; Abilene, TX		W 21–17	2,500
November 21	1:00 pm	at Northern Colorado*	Nottingham Field; Greeley, CO		L 36–40	3,387
*Non-conference game; ^{†}Homecoming; Rankings from STATS FCS Poll released prior to game Poll released prior to the game; All times are in Central time

== Game summaries ==
=== @ (FBS) Fresno State ===
Abilene Christian at Fresno State

Team	1	2	3	4	Total
Wildcats	7	0	0	6	13
• Bulldogs	14	7	10	3	34

- Date: September 5
- Location: Bulldog Stadium
  Fresno, CA
- Game start: 9:00 PM CDT
- Elapsed time: 3:16
- Game attendance: 32,547
- Game weather: 85 °F (29 °C), Sunny, winds NW 10 mph (16 km/h)
- Referee: Kevin Mar
- TV announcers (MW Net): Ray Crawford, Sherdrick Bonner

Scoring summary
1	11:29	Fresno St	Zack Greenlee pass complete to Jamire Jordan for 25 yds for a touchdown, Kody Kroening kick	0–7
1	5:31	Abilene Christian	Herschel Sims 1–yard run for a touchdown, Nick Grau kick	7–7
1	1:58	Fresno St	Zack Greenlee pass complete to Josiah Blandin for 32 yds for a touchdown, Kody Kroening kick	7–14
2	11:53	Fresno St	Chason Virgil pass complete to Chad Olsen for 4 yds for a touchdown, Kody Kroening kick	7–21
3	6:27	Fresno St	Kody Kroening 40 yd field goal	7–24
3	2:38	Fresno St	Zack Greenlee pass complete to Chad Olsen for 31 yds for a TD, Kody Kroening kick good	7–31
4	7:02	Fresno St	Jimmy Camacho 36 yd field goal	7–34
4	0:00	Abilene Christian	Dallas Sealey pass complete to Byron Proctor for 6 yds for a touchdown	13–34

=== Houston Baptist ===
Houston Baptist at Abilene Christian

Team	1	2	3	4	Total
Huskies	7	7	0	7	21
• Wildcats	7	14	21	7	49

- Date: September 19
- Location: Shotwell Stadium
  Abilene, TX
- Game start: 6:00 PM CDT
- Elapsed time: 2:55
- Game attendance: 7,327
- Game weather: 86 °F (30 °C), Partly Cloudy, winds ENE 12 mph (19 km/h)
- Referee: Dan Lewis
- TV announcers (ACU TV): Grant Boone, Bob Slater, Mary Kate Rotenberry

Scoring summary
1	11:55	Abilene Christian	Jonathan Epps 6 yard pass from Parker McKenzie (Zach Lehr kick), 5 plays, 64 yards, 2:07	7–0
1	1:23	Houston Baptist	B.J. Kelly 12 yard run (Travis Shinn kick), 10 plays, 66 yards, 4:53	7–7
2	9:31	Houston Baptist	Mev Ajdin 1 yard run (Travis Shinn kick), 10 plays, 63 yards, 5:29	7–14
2	6:31	Abilene Christian	Herschel Sims 9 yard run (Zach Lehr kick), 7 plays, 68 yards, 2:54	14–14
2	2:01	Abilene Christian	De'Andre Brown 1 yard run (Zach Lehr kick), 8 plays, 33 yards, 3:26	21–14
3	10:52	Abilene Christian	Cedric Gilbert 8 yard pass from Parker McKenzie (Zach Lehr kick), 8 plays, 65 yards, 4:08	28–14
3	5:42	Abilene Christian	Jamie Walker 3 yard pass from Cody Ennis (Zach Lehr kick), 9 plays, 58 yards, 3:25	35–14
3	0:01	Abilene Christian	Herschel Sims 35 yard run (Zach Lehr kick), 7 plays, 65 yards, 3:14	42–14
4	11:25	Houston Baptist	B.J. Kelly 12 yard run (Travis Shinn kick), 4 plays, 18 yards, 1:07	42–21
4	2:19	Abilene Christian	Jonathan Epps 8 yard pass from Parker McKenzie (Zach Lehr kick), 11 plays, 83 yards, 6:40	49–21

=== Stephen F. Austin ===
Stephen F. Austin at Abilene Christian

Team	1	2	3	4	Total
Lumberjacks	6	6	7	13	32
• Wildcats	13	7	7	8	35

- Date: September 26
- Location: Shotwell Stadium
  Abilene, TX
- Game start: 6:00 PM CDT
- Elapsed time: 3:35
- Game attendance: 3,529
- Game weather: 79 °F (26 °C), Partly Cloudy, winds E 2 mph (3.2 km/h)
- Referee: Kevin Hassell
- TV announcers (ASN): David Saltzman, ND Kalu, Chris Mycoskie

Scoring summary
1	11:49	Abilene Christian	Cedric Gilbert 23 Yd pass from Parker McKenzie (Zach Lehr PAT failed), 7 plays, 64 yards, 3:11	6–0
1	3:58	Abilene Christian	De'Andre Brown 2 yard run (Sam Lawlis kick), 10 play, 79 yards, 4:30	13–0
1	0:50	Stephen F Austin	Zach Conque 1 yard run (Nick Bruno PAT failed), 8 plays, 65 yards, 3:08	13–6
2	5:32	Abilene Christian	Cedric Gilbert 55 yard pass from Parker McKenzie (Zach Lehr kick), 6 plays, 77 yards, 1:27	20–6
2	0:01	Stephen F Austin	Aaron Piper 13 yard pass from Zach Conque (Mason Juhl PAT failed), 10 plays, 97 yards, 1:35	20–12
3	8:57	Abilene Christian	De'Andre Brown 61 yard run (Zach Lehr kick), 6 plays, 61 yards, 3:10	27–12
3	5:41	Stephen F Austin	Justice Liggins 38 yard pass from Zach Conque (Mason Juhl kick), 9 plays, 71 yards, 3:10	27–19
4	13:17	Stephen F Austin	Joshawa West 21 yard run (Mason Juhl kick), 9 plays, 67 yards, 4:25	27–26
4	10:48	Stephen F Austin	Robert Sylvester 44 yard pass from Zach Conque (two-point conv. failed), 4 plays, 40 yards, 1:17	27–32
4	5:59	Abilene Christian	De'Andre Brown 20 yard run (Parker McKenzie pass to Byron Proctor for two-point conv.) 11 plays, 75 yards, 4:49	35–32

=== @ Central Arkansas ===
Abilene Christian at Central Arkansas

Team	1	2	3	4	Total
Wildcats	0	7	0	7	14
• Bears	18	14	3	7	42

- Date: October 3
- Location: Estes Stadium
  Conway, AR
- Game start: 6:00 PM CDT
- Elapsed time: 2:50
- Game attendance: 9,427
- Referee: D. Lewis
- TV announcers (UCA Live): Steve Sullivan, Justin Acri, Monty Rowell

Scoring summary
1	13:35	Central Arkansas	Dominique Thomas 1 yard run (H. Hildebrand run for two-point conv.), 5 plays, 59 yards, 1:25	0–8
1	7:08	Central Arkansas	Jace Denker 27 yard field goal, 13 plays, 48 yards, 5:33	0–11
1	0:02	Central Arkansas	Hayden Hildebrand 53 yard pass to Jatavious Wilson (Jace Denker kick), 2 plays, 53 yards, 0:44	0–18
2	11:44	Central Arkansas	Hayden Hildebrand 23 yard pass to Justin Dickey (Jace Denker kick), 3 plays, 80 yards, 1:01	0–25
2	5:07	Central Arkansas	Blake Veasley 4 yard run (Jace Denker kick), 12 plays, 70 yards, 4:58	0–32
2	2:07	Abilene Christian	Parker McKenzie 10 yard pass to Cody Ennis (Zach Lehr kick), 8 plays, 59 yards, 2:52	7–32
3	4:18	Central Arkansas	Jace Denker 22 yard field goal, 4 plays, 3 yards, 1:35	7–35
4	14:54	Central Arkansas	Jatavious Wilson 13 yard run (Jace Denker kick), 6 plays, 38 yards, 2:47	7–42
4	11:01	Abilene Christian	Parker McKenzie 3 yard pass to Cedric Gilbert (Zach Lehr kick), 11 plays, 75 yards, 3:48	14–42

=== @ Lamar ===
Abilene Christian at Lamar

Team	1	2	3	4	Total
Wildcats	0	0	14	14	28
• Cardinals	7	17	10	10	44

- Date: October 10
- Location: Provost Umphrey Stadium
  Beaumont, TX
- Game start: 7:00 PM CDT
- Elapsed time: 3:16
- Game attendance: 13,136
- Referee: Brandon Cruse
- TV announcers (ESPN3): Randy McIlvoy, ND Kalu

Scoring summary
1	4:05	Lamar	Joe Minden 10 yard pass complete to Reggie Begelton (Alex Ball kick), 13 plays, 77 yards, 4:47	0–7
2	12:07	Lamar	Kade Harrington 80 yard run (Alex Ball kick), 1 play, 80 yards, 0:12	0–14
2	5:28	Lamar	Alex Ball 21 yard field goal, 4 plays, 4 yards, 2:00	0–17
2	0:26	Lamar	Joe Minden 13 yard pass complete to Michael Handy (Alex Ball kick), 6 plays, 62 yards, 2:09	0–24
3	9:35	Abilene Christian	Parker McKenzie 19 yard pass complete to Cedric Gilbert (Zach Lehr kick), 8 plays, 60 yards, 4:19	7–24
3	6:34	Lamar	Alex Ball 38 yard field goal, 9 plays, 54 yards, 3:01	7–27
3	2:37	Lamar	Joe Minden 8 yard pass complete to Devonn Brown (Alex Ball kick), 10 plays, 49 yards, 3:43	7–34
3	1:49	Abilene Christian	Parker McKenzie 58 yard pass complete to Jonathan Epps (Zach Lehr kick), 3 plays, 69 yards, 0:41	14–34
4	13:30	Abilene Christian	Herschel Sims 2 yard run (Zach Lehr kick), 4 plays, 65 yards, 1:25	21–34
4	11:05	Lamar	Kade Harrington 62 yard run (Alex Ball kick), 5 plays, 73 yards, 2:19	21–41
4	2:47	Lamar	Alex Ball 41 yard field goal, 5 plays, 11 yards, 2:46	21–44
4	0:37	Abilene Christian	Parker McKenzie 1 yard pass to Cedric Gilbert (Zach Lehr kick), 7 plays, 74 yards, 2:03	28–44

=== Sam Houston State ===
Sam Houston State at Abilene Christian

Team	1	2	3	4	Total
• #9 Bearkats	28	7	14	0	49
Wildcats	0	7	0	14	21

- Date: October 17
- Location: Shotwell Stadium
  Abilene, TX
- Game start: 2:00 PM CDT
- Elapsed time: 3:13
- Game attendance: 8,763
- Game weather: 79 °F (26 °C) • SSE 7 mph (11 km/h) • Sunny
- Referee: Kevin Mar
- TV announcers (ASN): David Saltzman, Shea Walker, Chris Mycoskie

Scoring summary
1	13:41	Sam Houston State	LaDarius Brown 64 yard pass from Jared Johnson (Luc Swimberghe kick), 4 plays, 75 yards, 1:19	0–7
1	8:07	Sam Houston State	Corey Avery 9 yard pass from Jared Johnson (Luc Swimberghe kick), 6 plays, 51 yards, 1:49	0–14
1	3:53	Sam Houston State	Collin Rison 24 yard pass from Jared Johnson (Luc Swimberghe kick), 6 plays, 81 yards, 1:26	0–21
1	0:22	Sam Houston State	Don King III 9 yard run (Luc Swimberghe kick), 5 plays, 37 yards, 1:07	0–28
2	9:44	Abilene Christian	Dallas Sealey 8 yard run (Zach Lehr kick), 11 plays, 80 yards, 5:30	7–28
2	1:19	Sam Houston State	Corey Avery 1 yard run (Luc Swimberghe kick), 5 plays, 80 yards, 2:04	7–35
3	9:24	Sam Houston State	Corey Avery 10 yard pass from Jared Johnson (Luc Swimberghe kick), 9 plays, 61 yards, 3:27	7–42
3	3:01	Sam Houston State	Davion Davis 13 yard pass from Jared Johnson (Luc Swimberghe kick), 8 plays, 68 yards, 2:16	7–49
4	12:47	Abilene Christian	Adrian Duncan 14 yard run (Zach Lehr kick), 12 plays, 78 yards, 5:08	14–49
4	4:45	Abilene Christian	Jamie Walker 7 yard pass from Cody Ennis (Zach Lehr kick), 6 plays, 86 yards, 2:57	21–49

=== @ Incarnate Word ===
Abilene Christian at Incarnate Word

Team	1	2	3	4	Total
Wildcats	0	3	17	0	20
• Cardinals	7	3	6	9	25

- Date: October 25
- Location: Gayle and Tom Benson Stadium
  San Antonio, TX
- Game start: 2:00 PM CDT
- Game attendance: 3,175
- TV announcers (UIWtv): Chris Reyes, Anthony Gollab

Scoring summary
1	8:32	Incarnate Word	Junior Sessions 1 yard run (Cody Seidel kick) 14 plays, 89 yards, 6:28	0–7
2	13:25	Incarnate Word	Cody Seidel 30 yard field goal, 11 plays, 78 yards, 4:12	0–10
2	0:00	Abilene Christian	Zach Lehr 28 yard field goal, 17 plays, 66 yards, 3:02	3–10
3	14:48	Abilene Christian	De'Andre Brown 70 yard run (Zach Lehr kick) 1 play, 70 yards, 0:12	10–10
3	8:44	Abilene Christian	Zach Lehr 32 yard field goal, 9 plays, 49 yards, 4:05	13–10
3	5:07	Incarnate Word	Jordan Hicks 4 yard pass from Trent Brittain (Cody Seidel kick blocked), 8 plays, 84 yards, 3:30	13–16
3	4:57	Abilene Christian	Carl Whitley 75 yard pass from Dallas Sealey (Zach Lehr kick), 1 play, 75 yards, 0:10	20–16
4	14:03	Incarnate Word	Cody Seidel 22 yard field goal, 15 plays, 72 yards, 5:45	20–19
4	0:48	Incarnate Word	Junior Sessions 15 yard run (Trent Brittain pass failed), 7 plays, 76 yards, 2:37	20–25

=== McNeese State ===
McNeese State at Abilene Christian

Team	1	2	3	4	Total
• #10 Cowboys	3	3	6	3	15
Wildcats	0	6	0	7	13

- Date: October 31
- Location: Shotwell Stadium
  Abilene, TX
- Game start: 2:00 PM CDT
- Elapsed time: 3:20
- Game attendance: 3,567
- Game weather: 65 °F (18 °C) • Sunny • NNW 13 mph (21 km/h)
- Referee: Marvel July
- TV announcers (ASN): Randy McIlvoy, ND Kalu

Scoring summary
1	9:25	McNeese State	Trent Manuel 28 yard field goal, 8 plays, 24 yards, 4:25	0–3
2	6:18	Abilene Christian	Dallas Sealey 9 yard pass from Herschel Sims (Zach Lehr PAT blocked), 5 plays, 17 yards, 2:02	6–3
2	0:00	McNeese State	Trent Manuel 27 yard field goal, 10 plays, 68 yards, 1:36	6–6
3	10:37	McNeese State	Daniel Sams 2 yard run (Trent Manuel PAT blocked), 9 plays, 69 yards, 4:16	6–12
4	4:31	McNeese State	Trent Manuel 23 yard field goal, 6 plays, 9 yards, 3:36	6–15
4	3:54	Abilene Christian	Carl Whitley 24 yard pass from Dallas Sealey (Zach Lehr kick), 2 plays, 75 yards, 0:37	13–15

=== @ Northwestern State ===
Abilene Christian at Northwestern State

Team	1	2	3	4	Total
Wildcats	7	0	0	15	22
• Demons	6	17	16	0	39

- Date: November 7
- Location: Harry Turpin Stadium
  Natchitoches, LA
- Game start: 6:00 PM CST
- Elapsed time: 3:03
- Game attendance: 5,377
- Game weather: 55 °F (13 °C) • NNE 3 mph (4.8 km/h) • Chilly and Rainy
- Referee: Ross Smith
- TV announcers (Demon TV): Patrick Netherton, Richard de Vargas, Tony Taglavore

Scoring summary
1	13:43	Northwestern State	Cody Jones 3 yard pass from Stephen Rivers (Chris Moore PAT failed), 3 plays, 27 yards, 1:17	0–6
1	3:24	Abilene Christian	Dallas Sealey 11 yard run (Zach Lehr kick), 8 plays, 73 yards, 3:03	7–6
2	11:42	Northwestern State	De'Mard Llorens 4 yard run (Chris Moore kick), 13 plays, 75 yards, 6:35	7–13
2	3:54	Northwestern State	Chris Moore 52 yard field goal, 8 plays, 42 yards, 4:05	7–16
2	0:23	Northwestern State	Shakeir Ryan 2 yard pass from Stephen Rivers (Chris Moore kick), 7 plays, 50 yards, 2:06	7–23
3	7:48	Northwestern State	Chris Moore 31 yard field goal, 10 plays, 62 yards, 5:28	7–26
3	5:42	Northwestern State	Ed Eagan 65 yard pass from Stephen Rivers (Chris Moore kick), 1 play, 65 yards, 0:10	7–33
3	0:56	Northwestern State	Chris Jones 37 yard run (Chris Moore PAT blocked), 1 play, 32 yards, 0:20	7–39
4	14:49	Abilene Christian	Herschel Sims 68 yard run (Zach Lehr kick), 3 plays, 75 yards, 1:03	14–39
4	7:21	Abilene Christian	Cody Ennis 2 yard pass from Dallas Sealey (Dallas Sealey pass to Monte Green-Avery for two-point conv.), 15 plays, 79 yards, 5:38	22–39

=== Southeastern Louisiana ===
Southeastern Louisiana at Abilene Christian

Team	1	2	3	4	Total
Lions	0	7	3	7	17
• Wildcats	0	0	7	14	21

- Date: November 14
- Location: Shotwell Stadium
  Abilene, TX
- Game start: 2:00 PM CST
- Elapsed time: 3:07
- Game attendance: 2,500
- Game weather: 58 °F (14 °C) • S 12 mph (19 km/h) • Cloudy
- Referee: Kevin Hassell
- TV announcers (ACU TV): Grant Boone, Bob Slater, Mary Kate Rotenberry

Scoring summary
2	11:10	Southeastern Louisiana	D'Shaie Landor 2 yard run (Jonathon Tatum kick), 13 plays, 66 yards, 4:58	0–7
3	11:33	Abilene Christian	Herschel Sims 42 yard run (Zach Lehr kick), 4 plays, 68 yards, 1:46	7–7
3	2:31	Southeastern Louisiana	Jonathon Tatum 29 yard field goal, 12 plays, 68 yards, 5:59	7–10
4	14:54	Southeastern Louisiana	Chris Briggs 15 yard pass from D'Shaie Landor (Jonathon Tatum kick), 4 plays, 18 yards, 1:18	7–17
4	12:56	Abilene Christian	Monte Green-Avery 14 yard pass from Parker McKenzie (Zach Lehr kick), 5 plays, 75 yards, 2:03	14–17
4	0:22	Abilene Christian	Jamie Walker 1 yard pass from Parker McKenzie (Zach Lehr kick), 18 plays, 80 yards, 7:46	21–17

=== @ Northern Colorado ===
Abilene Christian at Northern Colorado

Team	1	2	3	4	Total
Wildcats	14	7	7	8	36
• Bears	6	21	3	10	40

- Date: November 21
- Location: Nottingham Stadium
  Greeley, CO
- Game start: 2:00 PM CST
- Elapsed time: 3:05
- Game attendance: 3,387
- Game weather: 40 °F (4 °C) • 10 mph (16 km/h) • Very chilly
- Referee: Scott Root
- TV announcers (Watch Big Sky): Troy Coverdale, Bryant Warren

Scoring summary
1	11:21	Abilene Christian	Herschel Sims 1 yard run (Zach Lehr kick), 6 plays, 41 yards, 2:30	7–0
1	7:52	Northern Colorado	Trae Riek 20 yard run (Jamie Falloon PAT failed), 11 plays, 75 yards, 3:24	7–6
1	5:37	Abilene Christian	Herschel Sims 2 yard run (Zach Lehr kick), 6 plays, 75 yards, 2:15	14–6
2	13:34	Northern Colorado	Trae Riek 68 yard pass from Jacob Knipp (Jamie Falloon kick), 5 plays, 84 yards, 1:32	14–13
2	10:23	Northern Colorado	Stephen Miller 31 yard pass from Jacob Knipp (Jamie Falloon kick), 3 plays, 57 yards, 1:00	14–20
2	5:10	Abilene Christian	Jonathan Epps 7 yard pass from Parker McKenzie (Zach Lehr kick), 10 plays, 78 yards, 5:07	21–20
2	2:48	Northern Colorado	Jacob Knipp 42 yard run (Jamie Falloon kick), 6 plays, 79 yards, 2:17	21–27
3	10:26	Abilene Christian	Herschel Sims 1 yard run (Zach Lehr kick), 10 plays, 75 yards, 4:34	28–27
3	7:41	Northern Colorado	Jamie Falloon 22 yard field goal, 8 plays, 68 yards, 2:39	28–30
4	14:11	Northern Colorado	Jamie Falloon 44 yard field goal, 5 plays, 29 yards, 2:45	28–33
4	10:42	Abilene Christian	Cedric Gilbert 10 yard pass from Parker McKenzie (Herschel Sims run for two-point conv.), 8 plays, 83 yards, 3:25	36–33
4	8:22	Northern Colorado	Stephen Miller 13 yard pass from Jacob Knipp (Jamie Falloon kick), 6 plays, 65 yards, 2:20	36–40
