= 2015 Central Arkansas Bears football team =

American college football season

2015 Central Arkansas Bears football
- Conference: Southland Conference
- Record: 7–4 (7–2 Southland)
- Head coach: Steve Campbell (2nd season)
- Offensive coordinator: Nathan Brown (2nd season)
- Offensive scheme: Spread
- Defensive coordinator: Greg Stewart (2nd season)
- Base defense: 4–3
- Home stadium: Estes Stadium

2015 Southland Conference football standings
	Conf.			Overall
Team	W		L	W		L
No. 7 McNeese State $^	9	–	0	10	–	1
No. 3 Sam Houston State ^	7	–	2	11	–	4
Central Arkansas	7	–	2	7	–	4
Incarnate Word *	5	–	4	6	–	5
Lamar	4	–	5	5	–	6
Northwestern State	4	–	5	4	–	7
Stephen F. Austin	4	–	5	4	–	7
SE Louisiana	3	–	6	4	–	7
Abilene Christian *	3	–	6	3	–	8
Nicholls State	3	–	6	3	–	8
Houston Baptist	0	–	8	2	–	9
$ – Conference champion; ^ – FCS playoff participant; * – ineligible for FCS playoffs due to transition from NCAA Division II; Rankings from STATS poll

The 2015 Central Arkansas Bears football team represented the University of Central Arkansas in the 2015 NCAA Division I FCS football season. The Bears were led by second-year head coach Steve Campbell and played their home games at Estes Stadium. They were a member of the Southland Conference. They finished the season 7–4, 7–2 in Southland play to finish in a tie for second place. They were not invited to the FCS Playoffs.

== Schedule ==
Date	Time	Opponent	Site	TV	Result	Attendance
September 3	6:00 pm	at Samford*	Seibert Stadium; Homewood, AL	ESPN3	L 16–45	6,259
September 12	6:30 pm	at Oklahoma State*	Boone Pickens Stadium; Stillwater, OK	FSN, FCS Atlantic	L 8–32	56,262
September 26	6:00 pm	at Northwestern State	Harry Turpin Stadium; Natchitoches, LA	ESPN3	W 49–21	10,725
October 3	6:00 pm	Abilene Christian	Estes Stadium; Conway, AR	ESPN3	W 42–14	9,427
October 10	2:30 pm	at Houston Baptist	Husky Stadium; Houston, TX	ASN	W 43–7	2,217
October 17	6:00 pm	No. 15 McNeese State	Estes Stadium; Conway, AR (Red Beans and Rice Bowl)	ESPN3	L 13–28	10,527
October 24	6:00 pm	at Lamar	Provost Umphrey Stadium; Beaumont, TX	ESPN3	W 35–17	6,476
October 31	7:00 pm	Southeastern Louisiana^{†}	Estes Stadium; Conway, AR	ESPN3	W 21–16	7,427
November 7	3:00 pm	Stephen F. Austin	Estes Stadium; Conway, AR	ASN	W 36–24	6,157
November 14	3:00 pm	at Nicholls State	John L. Guidry Stadium; Thibodaux, LA	SLDN	W 34–31	5,002
November 21	5:00 pm	No. 10 Sam Houston State	Estes Stadium; Conway, AR	SLDN	L 13–42	5,117
*Non-conference game; ^{†}Homecoming; Rankings from STATS Poll released prior to the game; All times are in Central time

== Game summaries ==
=== @ Samford ===
Central Arkansas at Samford

Team	1	2	3	4	Total
Bears	7	6	0	3	16
• Bulldogs	7	21	3	14	45

- Date: September 3
- Location: Seibert Stadium
  Homewood, AL
- Game start: 6:00 PM CDT
- Elapsed time: 3:37
- Game attendance: 6,259
- Game weather: 86°F • NW 6 • Partly Cloudy
- Referee: Marshall Lewis
- Television network: ESPN3

Scoring summary
1	5:48	Central Arkansas	Dominique Thomas 29 yard run (Jace Denker kick), Drive: 7 plays, 52 yards, 1:29	7–0
1	5:03	Samford	Karel Hamilton 55 yard pass from Michael Eubank (Anthony Pistelli kick), Drive: 3 plays, 64 yards, 0:38	7–7
2	10:56	Samford	Vaquan Small 35 yard pass from Michael Eubank (Anthony Pistelli kick), Drive: 4 plays, 53 yards, 1:24	7–14
2	9:09	Samford	Denzel Williams 49 yard run (Anthony Pistelli kick), Drive: 3 plays, 82 yards, 0:39	7–21
2	6:24	Central Arkansas	Jace Denker 26 yard field goal, Drive: 9 plays, 65 yards, 2:40	10–21
2	1:18	Samford	Kelvin McKnight 66 yard pass from Michael Eubank (Anthony Pistelli kick), Drive: 3 plays, 66 yards, 0:40	10–28
2	0:00	Central Arkansas	Matt Cummins 50 yard field goal, Drive: 8 plays, 25 yards, 1:12	13–28
3	4:55	Samford	Anthony Pistelli 21 yard field goal, Drive: 13 plays, 83 yards, 3:36	13–31
4	13:33	Central Arkansas	Jace Denker 34 yard field goal, Drive: 8 plays, 29 yards, 2:12	16–31
4	12:41	Samford	K'rondis Larry 54 yard run (Anthony Pistelli kick), Drive: 5 plays, 83 yards, 0:47	16–38
4	9:13	Samford	Denzel Williams 16 yard pass from Michael Eubank (Anthony Pistelli kick), Drive: 5 plays, 28 yards, 1:45	16–45

=== @ Oklahoma State ===
Central Arkansas at Oklahoma State

Team	1	2	3	4	Total
Bears	0	0	8	0	8
• Cowboys	10	0	10	12	32

- Date: September 12
- Location: Boone Pickens Stadium
  Stillwater, OK
- Game start: 6:30 PM CDT
- Elapsed time: 3:17
- Game attendance: 56,262
- Game weather: 77°F • ESE 7 • Clear and comfortable
- Referee: Reggie Smith
- Television network: FSN, FCS Atlantic

Scoring summary
1	7:44	Oklahoma State	Ben Grogan 31 yard field goal, Drive: 8 plays, 70 yards, 2:39	0–3
1	4:17	Oklahoma State	Chris Carson 21 yard run (Ben Grogan kick), Drive: 4 plays, 55 yards, 1:26	0–10
3	12:23	Oklahoma State	David Glidden 67 yard pass from Mason Rudolph (Ben Grogan kick), Drive: 2 plays, 61 yards, 0:49	0–17
3	8:08	Central Arkansas	Desmond Smith 39 yard pass from Taylor Reed (Taylor Reed pass to Zach Gougler for two-point conv.), Drive: 10 plays, 75 yards, 4:15	8–17
3	3:30	Oklahoma State	Ben Grogan 22 yard field goal, Drive: 10 plays, 42 yards, 4:38	8–20
4	14:53	Oklahoma State	David Glidden 31 yard pass from Mason Rudolph (Ben Grogan kick blocked), Drive: 3 plays, 68 yards, 0:47	8–26
4	10:56	Oklahoma State	Jeremy Seaton 6 yard pass from J. W. Walsh (Ben Grogan kick blocked), Drive: 7 plays, 74 yards, 2:39	8–32

=== @ Northwestern State ===
Central Arkansas at Northwestern State

Team	1	2	3	4	Total
• Bears	18	10	14	7	49
Demons	0	7	7	7	21

- Date: September 26
- Location: Harry Turpin Stadium, Natchitoches, LA
- Game start: 6:00 PM CDT
- Elapsed time: 3:25
- Game attendance: 10,725
- Game weather: 87°F • NNE 7 • Mostly Sunny
- Referee: Ross Smith
- Television network: ESPN3

Scoring summary
1	10:17	Central Arkansas	Alex Deason 47 yard field goal, Drive: 12 plays, 44 yards, 4:43	3–0
1	6:32	Central Arkansas	Desmond Smith 16 yard pass from Taylor Reed (Scott Matiaha run for two-point conv.), Drive: 3 plays, 27 yards, 1:01	11–0
1	2:47	Central Arkansas	Blake Veasley 1 yard run (Jace Denker kick), Drive: 4 plays, 64 yards, 1:32	18–0
2	10:12	Central Arkansas	Blake Veasley 3 yard run (Jace Denker kick), Drive: 11 plays, 80 yards, 4:43	25–0
2	4:31	Central Arkansas	Jace Denker 22 yard field goal, Drive: 4 plays, 6 yards, 1:54	28–0
2	1:28	Northwestern State	Ed Eagan 6 yard pass from J.D. Almond (Chris Moore kick), Drive: 8 plays, 83 yards, 2:57	28–7
3	10:05	Central Arkansas	Jacquez McMillian 45 yard pass from Hayden Hildebrand (Jace Denker kick), Drive: 9 plays, 83 yards, 3:19	35–7
4	8:12	Northwestern State	De'Mar Llorens 4 yard run (Chris Moore kick), Drive: 7 plays, 75 yards, 1:53	35–14
4	5:17	Central Arkansas	Jatavious Wilson 42 yard pass from Hayden Hildebrand (Jace Denker kick), Drive: 1 play, 42 yards, 0:08	42–14
4	12:19	Central Arkansas	Blake Gardner 22 yard pass from Hayden Hildebrand (Jace Denker kick), Drive: 7 plays, 86 yards, 3:14	49–14
4	8:35	Northwestern State	Ed Eagan 28 yard pass from J.D. Almond (Chris Moore kick), Drive: 10 plays, 73 yards, 3:38	49–21

=== Abilene Christian ===
Abilene Christian at Central Arkansas

Team	1	2	3	4	Total
Wildcats	0	7	0	7	14
• Bears	18	14	3	7	42

- Date: October 3
- Location: Estes Stadium
  Conway, AR
- Game start: 6:00 PM CDT
- Elapsed time: 2:50
- Game attendance: 9,427
- Referee: D. Lewis
- Television network: ESPN3

Scoring summary
1	13:35	Central Arkansas	Dominique Thomas 1 yard run (Hayden Hildebrand run for two-point conv.), Drive: 5 plays, 59 yards, 1:25	8–0
1	7:08	Central Arkansas	Jace Denker 27 yard field goal, Drive: 13 plays, 48 yards, 5:33	11–0
1	0:02	Central Arkansas	Hayden Hildebrand 53 yard pass complete to Jatavious Wilson (Jace Denker kick), Drive: 2 plays, 53 yards, 0:44	18–0
2	11:44	Central Arkansas	Hayden Hildebrand 23 yard pass complete to Justin Dickey (Jace Denker kick), Drive: 3 plays, 80 yards, 1:01	25–0
2	5:07	Central Arkansas	Blake Veasley 4 yard run (Jace Denker kick), Drive: 12 plays, 70 yards, 4:58	32–0
2	2:07	Abilene Christian	Parker McKenzie 10 yard pass complete to Cody Ennis (Zach Lehr kick), Drive: 8 plays, 59 yards, 2:52	32–7
3	4:18	Central Arkansas	Jace Denker 22 yard field goal, Drive: 4 plays, 3 yards, 1:35	35–7
4	14:54	Central Arkansas	Jatavious Wilson 13 yard run (Jace Denker kick), Drive: 6 plays, 38 yards, 2:47	42–7
4	11:01	Abilene Christian	Parker McKenzie 3 yard pass complete to Cedric Gilbert (Zach Lehr kick), Drive: 11 plays, 75 yards, 3:48	42–14

=== @ Houston Baptist ===
Central Arkansas at Houston Baptist

Team	1	2	3	4	Total
• Bears	13	13	7	10	43
Huskies	0	7	0	0	7

- Date: October 10
- Location: Husky Stadium
  Houston, TX
- Game start: 2:30 PM CDT
- Elapsed time: 3:03
- Game attendance: 2,217
- Game weather: 86°F • NNE 7 • Sunny
- Referee: Vidal Jones
- Television network: ASN

Scoring summary
1	8:22	Central Arkansas	Dominique Thomas 6 yard pass from Hayden Hildebrand (Cody Dauksch two-point conv. intercepted), Drive: 8 plays, 80 yards, 2:31	6–0
1	1:58	Central Arkansas	Brandon Cox 93 yard punt return (Jace Denker kick), Drive: 9 plays, 43 yards, 6:18	13–0
2	12:18	Central Arkansas	Dominique Thomas 3 yard run (Jace Denker kick failed), Drive: 6 plays, 64 yards, 2:30	19–0
2	2:26	Houston Baptist	Ricardo Barnett 18 yard pass from Max Staver (Travis Shinn kick), Drive: 6 plays, 51 yards, 2:30	19–7
2	1:01	Central Arkansas	Blake Veasley 6 yard pass from Hayden Hildebrand (Jace Denker kick), Drive: 7 plays, 71 yards, 1:25	26–7
3	7:53	Central Arkansas	Blake Veasley 11 yard pass from Hayden Hildebrand (Jace Denker kick), Drive: 9 plays, 72 yards, 3:51	33–7
4	11:05	Central Arkansas	Roman Gordon 12 yard pass from Hayden Hildebrand (Jace Denker kick), Drive: 7 plays, 68 yards, 2:45	40–7
4	1:04	Central Arkansas	Jace Denker 22 yard field goal, Drive: 15 plays, 58 yards, 7:11	43–7

=== McNeese State ===
McNeese State at Central Arkansas

Team	1	2	3	4	Total
• #15 Cowboys	0	0	7	21	28
Bears	0	3	10	0	13

- Date: October 17
- Location: Estes Stadium
  Conway, AR
- Game start: 6:00 PM CDT
- Elapsed time: 3:27
- Game attendance: 10,527
- Game weather: 66°F • Clear
- Referee: K. Boitman

Scoring summary
2	3:13	Central Arkansas	Jace Denker 42 yard field goal, Drive: 4 plays, 1 yard, 0:43	3–0
3	12:22	McNeese State	Daniel Sams 5 yard run (Trent Manuel kick), Drive: 3 plays, 46 yards, 1:08	3–7
3	6:42	Central Arkansas	Dominique Thomas 1 yard run (Jace Denker kick), Drive: 12 plays, 78 yards, 5:32	10–7
3	3:13	Central Arkansas	Jace Denker 44 yard field goal, Drive: 6 plays, 52 yards, 2:08	13–7
4	14:50	McNeese State	Wallace Scott 45 yard fumble return (Trent Manuel kick), Drive: 5 plays, 10 yards, 2:16	13–14
4	9:47	McNeese State	Ryan Ross 10 yard run (Trent Manuel kick), Drive: 7 plays, 46 yards, 3:24	13–21
4	6:56	McNeese State	Daniel Sams 2 yard run (Trent Manuel kick), Drive: 5 plays, 16 yards, 1:56	13–28

=== @ Lamar ===
Central Arkansas at Lamar

Team	1	2	3	4	Total
• Bears	15	6	7	7	35
Cardinals	0	3	14	0	17

- Date: October 24
- Location: Provost Umphrey Stadium
  Beaumont, TX
- Game start: 6:00 PM CDT
- Elapsed time: 3:03
- Game attendance: 6,476
- Game weather: 74°F • Rain
- Referee: Ross Smith
- TV announcers (ESPN3): Randy McIlvoy, Shea Walker

Scoring summary
1	4:50	Central Arkansas	Blake Veasley 1 yard run (Scott Matiaha run for two-point conv.), Drive: 11 plays, 85 yards, 4:37	8–0
1	0:50	Central Arkansas	Blake Veasley 14 yard run (Jace Denker kick), Drive: 5 plays, 48 yards, 1:53	15–0
2	7:59	Lamar	Alex Ball 23 yard field goal, Drive: 6 plays, 69 yards, 2:02	15–3
2	1:46	Central Arkansas	Jace Denker 21 yard field goal, Drive: 14 plays, 58 yards, 6:06	18–3
2	0:00	Central Arkansas	Jace Denker 21 yard field goal, Drive: 8 plays, 55 yards, 1:04	21–3
3	12:38	Central Arkansas	Blake Veasley 56 yard run (Jace Denker kick), Drive: 3 plays, 70 yards, 1:02	28–3
3	12:28	Lamar	Kade Harrington 65 yard run (Alex Ball kick), Drive: 1 play, 65 yards, 0:10	28–10
3	1:44	Lamar	Kade Harrington 50 yard run (Alex Ball kick), Drive: 5 play, 80 yards, 1:50	28–17
4	12:38	Central Arkansas	Blake Veasley 19 yard run (Jace Denker kick), Drive: 2 plays, 22 yards, 0:44	35–17

=== Southeastern Louisiana (homecoming) ===
Southeastern Louisiana at Central Arkansas

Team	1	2	3	4	Total
Lions	0	3	6	7	16
• Bears	7	7	0	7	21

- Date: October 31
- Location: Estes Stadium
  Conway, AR
- Game start: 7:00 PM CDT
- Elapsed time: 3:07
- Game attendance: 7,427
- Game weather: 60°F • Cloudy
- Referee: M. Defee

Scoring summary
1	11:28	Central Arkansas	Blake Veasley 1 yard run (Jace Denker kick), Drive: 8 plays, 81 yards, 3:32	7–0
2	8:08	Southeastern Louisiana	Jonathon Tatum 25 yard field goal, Drive: 6 plays, 87 yards, 3:29	7–3
2	2:37	Central Arkansas	Kirk Baugh 10 yard run (Jace Denker kick), Drive: 4 plays, 40 yards, 1:25	14–3
3	12:06	Southeastern Louisiana	Jonathon Tatum 38 yard field goal, Drive: 9 plays, 48 yards, 2:46	14–6
3	5:58	Southeastern Louisiana	Jonathon Tatum 40 yard field goal, Drive: 5 plays, 71 yards, 2:31	14–9
4	14:18	Central Arkansas	Dominique Thomas 45 yard run (Jace Denker kick), Drive: 8 plays, 78 yards, 3:15	21–9
4	9:12	Southeastern Louisiana	Julius Maraclin 7 yard run (Jonathon Tatum kick), Drive: 3 plays, 52 yards, 1:18	21–16

=== Stephen F. Austin ===
Stephen F. Austin at Central Arkansas

Team	1	2	3	4	Total
Lumberjacks	0	13	11	0	24
• Bears	10	7	12	7	36

- Date: November 7
- Location: Estes Stadium
  Conway, AR
- Game start: 3:00 PM CST
- Elapsed time: 2:26
- Game attendance: 6,157
- Referee: M. Defee

Scoring summary
1	6:30	Central Arkansas	Jace Denker 32 yard field goal, Drive: 15 plays, 61 yards, 6:17	3–0
1	4:42	Central Arkansas	Jeff Anderson 55 yard run (Jace Denker kick), Drive: 1 play, 55 yards, 0:11	10–0
2	14:55	Stephen F. Austin	Mason Juhl 33 yard field goal, Drive: 12 plays, 61 yards, 4:45	10–3
2	12:37	Stephen F. Austin	Zach Conque 1 yard run (Mason Juhl kick), Drive: 6 plays, 18 yards, 2:14	10–10
2	7:04	Stephen F. Austin	Mason Juhl 27 yard field goal, Drive: 7 plays, 11 yards, 1:51	10–13
2	2:10	Central Arkansas	Blake Veasley 1 yard run (Jace Denker kick), Drive: 12 plays, 61 yards, 4:17	17–13
3	12:34	Stephen F. Austin	Mason Juhl 25 yard field goal, Drive: 6 plays, 59 yards, 2:21	17–16
3	3:28	Stephen F. Austin	Joshawa West 45 yard pass from Zach Conque (Zach Conque run for two-point conv.), Drive: 4 plays, 80 yards, 1:34	17–24
3	2:24	Central Arkansas	Jatavious Wilson 38 yard pass from Hayden Hildebrand (Jace Denker kick blocked), Drive: 3 plays, 67 yards, 1:03	23–24
3	1:08	Central Arkansas	Kelton Warren 37 yard run (two-point conv. failed), Drive: 3 plays, 52 yards, 1:14	29–24
4	9:54	Central Arkansas	Kelton Warren 21 yard run (Jace Denker kick), Drive: 10 plays, 91 yards, 4:27	36–24

=== @ Nicholls ===
Central Arkansas at Nicholls

Team	1	2	3	4	Total
• Bears	3	14	10	7	34
Colonels	0	10	7	14	31

- Date: November 14
- Location: John L. Guidry Stadium
  Thibodaux, LA
- Game start: 3:00 PM CST
- Elapsed time: 3:27
- Game attendance: 5,002
- Game weather: 60°F • NE 4 • Clear
- Referee: Dan Lewis
- Television network: SLDN

Scoring summary
1	0:11	Central Arkansas	Jace Denker 30 yard field goal, Drive: 10 plays, 60 yards, 3:43	3–0
2	10:32	Nicholls	C.J. Bates 15 yard pass from Landry Klann (Francisco Condado kick), Drive: 11 plays, 75 yards, 4:39	3–7
2	10:17	Central Arkansas	Jatavious Wilson 22 yard run (Jace Denker kick), Drive: 1 play, 22 yards, 0:08	10–7
2	4:05	Nicholls	Francisco Condado 23 yard field goal, Drive: 12 plays, 56 yards, 6:01	10–10
2	2:37	Central Arkansas	Justin Dickey 27 yard pass from Hayden Hildebrand (Jace Denker kick), Drive: 2 plays, 27 yards, 0:14	17–10
3	13:36	Nicholls	C.J. Bates 9 yard pass from Landry Klann (Francisco Condado kick), Drive: 3 plays, 9 yards, 0:42	17–17
3	8:49	Central Arkansas	Jace Denker 33 yard field goal, Drive: 11 plays, 62 yards, 4:41	20–17
3	7:39	Central Arkansas	Blake Veasley 6 yard run (Jace Denker kick), Drive: 1 play, 6 yards, 0:04	27–17
4	13:34	Central Arkansas	Blake Veasley 1 yard run (Jace Denker kick), Drive: 14 plays, 92 yards, 6:05	34–17
4	10:22	Nicholls	Terry Lucas 51 yard pass from Landry Klann (Francisco Condado kick), Drive: 1 play, 51 yards, 0:11	34–24
4	6:13	Nicholls	Stephe LeBouef 17 yard pass from Landry Klann (Francisco Condado kick), Drive: 7 plays, 65 yards, 2:30	34–31

=== Sam Houston State ===
Sam Houston State at Central Arkansas

Team	1	2	3	4	Total
• #10 Bearkats	14	21	7	0	42
Bears	6	0	7	0	13

- Date: November 21
- Location: Estes Stadium
  Conway, AR
- Game start: 7:00 PM CST
- Elapsed time: 3:21
- Game attendance: 3,575
- Referee: D. Alvarez
- Television network: SLDN

Scoring summary
1	12:20	Central Arkansas	Jace Denker 45 yard field goal, Drive: 5 plays, 38 yards, 1:22	3–0
1	11:01	Sam Houston State	Jalen Overstreet 13 yard run (Tre Honshtein kick), Drive: 6 plays, 80 yards, 1:11	3–7
1	6:49	Central Arkansas	Jace Denker 35 yard field goal, Drive: 11 plays, 54 yards, 4:05	6–7
1	2:39	Sam Houston State	Corey Avery 45 yard run (Tre Honshtein kick), Drive: 1 play, 45 yards, 0:07	6–14
2	10:09	Sam Houston State	Corey Avery 3 yard run (Tre Honshtein kick), Drive: 4 plays, 39 yards, 1:10	6–21
2	1:37	Sam Houston State	Gerald Thomas 50 yard pass from Jared Johnson (Tre Honshtein kick), Drive: 3 plays, 53 yards, 0:41	6–28
2	0:21	Sam Houston State	LaDarius Brown 3 yard pass from Jared Johnson (Tre Honshtein kick), Drive: 3 plays, 62 yards, 0:21	6–35
3	11:42	Sam Houston State	Jalen Overstreet 30 yard run (Tre Honshtein kick), Drive: 6 plays, 55 yards, 1:57	6–42
3	2:00	Central Arkansas	Jatavious Wilson 28 yard pass from Hayden Hildebrand (Jace Denker kick), Drive: 4 plays, 65 yards, 1:14	13–42

== Ranking movements ==
Ranking movements Legend: ██ Increase in ranking ██ Decrease in ranking — = Not ranked RV = Received votes
	Week													
Poll	Pre	1	2	3	4	5	6	7	8	9	10	11	12	Final
STATS FCS	RV	—	—	—	—	—	RV	RV	RV	RV	RV	RV	RV	
Coaches	RV	—	—	—	—	—	RV	—	RV	RV	RV	25	RV	
