= 2015 McNeese State Cowboys football team =

American college football season

2015 McNeese State Cowboys football

Southland champion

NCAA Division I Second Round, L 29–34 vs. Sam Houston State
- Conference: Southland Conference

Ranking
- STATS: No. 7
- FCS Coaches: No. 9
- Record: 10–1 (9–0 Southland)
- Head coach: Matt Viator (10th season)
- Offensive coordinator: Tim Leger (9th season)
- Defensive coordinator: Lance Guidry (3rd season)
- Home stadium: Cowboy Stadium

2015 Southland Conference football standings
	Conf.			Overall
Team	W		L	W		L
No. 7 McNeese State $^	9	–	0	10	–	1
No. 3 Sam Houston State ^	7	–	2	11	–	4
Central Arkansas	7	–	2	7	–	4
Incarnate Word *	5	–	4	6	–	5
Lamar	4	–	5	5	–	6
Northwestern State	4	–	5	4	–	7
Stephen F. Austin	4	–	5	4	–	7
SE Louisiana	3	–	6	4	–	7
Abilene Christian *	3	–	6	3	–	8
Nicholls State	3	–	6	3	–	8
Houston Baptist	0	–	8	2	–	9
$ – Conference champion; ^ – FCS playoff participant; * – ineligible for FCS playoffs due to transition from NCAA Division II; Rankings from STATS poll

The 2015 McNeese State Cowboys football team represented McNeese State University as a member of the Southland Conference during the 2015 NCAA Division I FCS football season. Led by Matt Viator in his tenth and final season as head coach, the Cowboys compiled an overall record of 10–1 with a mark of 9–0 in conference play, winning the Southland title. McNeese State received the conference's automatic bid to NCAA Division I Football Championship playoffs, where, after a first-round bye, the Cowboys lost in the second round to fellow Southland member, Sam Houston State. The team played home games at Cowboy Stadium in Lake Charles, Louisiana.

== Schedule ==
Date	Time	Opponent	Rank	Site	TV	Result	Attendance
September 5	6:30 pm	No. 14 (FBS) LSU*	No. 25	Tiger Stadium; Baton Rouge, LA	SECN	Canceled^{[a]}	
September 12	6:00 pm	Incarnate Word		Cowboy Stadium; Lake Charles, LA	ASN	W 43–6	12,804
September 19	6:00 pm	at Stephen F. Austin		Homer Bryce Stadium; Nacogdoches, TX	ESPN3	W 28–14	12,018
September 26	6:00 pm	Mississippi College*	No. 25	Cowboy Stadium; Lake Charles, LA		W 37–0	10,436
October 3	3:00 pm	at Nicholls State	No. 23	John L. Guidry Stadium; Thibodaux, LA	CST	W 37–7	6,192
October 10	6:00 pm	No. 20 Southeastern Louisiana	No. 22	Cowboy Stadium; Lake Charles, LA	CST	W 21–7	13,110
October 17	6:00 pm	at Central Arkansas	No. 15	Estes Stadium; Conway, AR (Red Beans and Rice Bowl)	ESPN3	W 28–13	10,527
October 24	6:00 pm	Northwestern State^{†}	No. 12	Cowboy Stadium; Lake Charles, LA (rivalry)	CST	W 47–27	9,806
October 31	2:00 pm	at Abilene Christian	No. 10	Shotwell Stadium; Abilene, TX	ASN	W 15–13	3,567
November 7	6:00 pm	No. 7 Sam Houston State	No. 9	Cowboy Stadium; Lake Charles, LA	ESPN3	W 27–10	10,501
November 21	6:00 pm	at Lamar	No. 3	Provost Umphrey Stadium; Beaumont, TX (Battle of the Border)	ESPN3	W 20–14	9,808
December 5	7:00 pm	No. 6 Sam Houston State	No. 3	Cowboy Stadium; Lake Charles, LA (NCAA Division I Second Round)	ESPN3	L 29–34	13,493
*Non-conference game; ^{†}Homecoming; Rankings from STATS Poll released prior to the game; All times are in Central time

^{^[a]}The game between LSU and McNeese State was canceled due to inclement weather. The game was delayed due to lightning after 5 minutes of play during each team held the ball for one drive and no one scored. Both schools' athletic directors decided not to reschedule the game, thus declaring it a "no contest". LSU did agree to pay McNeese State its promised fee of $500,000.

== Game summaries ==
=== @ LSU ===
McNeese State at LSU

Team	1	2	3	4	Total
#25 Cowboys	0	0	0	0	0
Tigers	0	0	0	0	0

- Date: September 5
- Location: Tiger Stadium
  Baton Rouge, LA
- Game start: CANCELLED

=== Incarnate Word ===
Incarnate Word at McNeese State

Team	1	2	3	4	Total
Cardinals	0	0	0	6	6
• Cowboys	7	2	20	14	43

- Date: September 12
- Location: Cowboy Stadium
  Lake Charles, LA
- Game start: 6:00 PM CDT
- Elapsed time: 3:18
- Game attendance: 12,804
- Game weather: NNW 11 • Fair, 38% humidity
- Referee: Ross Smith
- Television network: ASN

Scoring summary
1	3:50	McNeese State	Derrick Milton 36 yard run (Trent Manuel kick), Drive: 6 plays, 62 yards, 2:33	7–0
2	1:39	McNeese State	Team Safety, Drive: 0 plays, -1 yard, 0:07	9–0
3	10:36	McNeese State	Trent Manuel 20 yard field goal, Drive: 10 plays, 62 yards, 4:24	12–0
3	7:38	McNeese State	Austin Nelson 2 yard pass from Daniel Sams (Trent Manuel kick), Drive: 4 plays, 39 yards, 1:50	19–0
3	4:03	McNeese State	Trent Manuel 22 yard field goal, Drive: 5 plays, 43 yards, 1:52	22–0
3	0:26	McNeese State	Daniel Sams 2 yard run (Trent Manuel kick), Drive: 7 plays, 36 yards, 3:37	29–0
4	12:01	McNeese State	Grant Ashcraft 2 yard run (Trent Manuel Kick), Drive: 5 plays, 22 yards, 2:09	36–0
4	7:15	Incarnate Word	Kody Edwards 11 yard pass from Jordan Scelfo (two-point pass conv. failed), Drive: 10 plays, 90 yards, 4:46	36–7
4	3:56	McNeese State	David Hamm 33 yard run (Trent Manuel kick), Drive: 1 play, 28 yards, 0:09	43–7

=== @ Stephen F. Austin ===
McNeese State at Stephen F. Austin

Team	1	2	3	4	Total
• Cowboys	7	14	0	7	28
Lumberjacks	14	0	0	0	14

- Date: September 19
- Location: Homer Bryce Stadium
  Nacogdoches, TX
- Game start: 6:00 PM CDT
- Elapsed time: 3:25
- Game attendance: 12,018
- Game weather: High 80's • SE 0–5 • Sunny and clear
- Referee: Brandon Cruse
- Television network: ESPN3

Scoring summary
1	11:15	McNeese State	Wallace Scott 97 yard fumble return (Trent Manuel kick), Drive: 5 plays, 77 yards, 2:25	7–0
1	8:43	Stephen F. Austin	Aaron Thomas 14 yard pass from Hunter Taylor (Nick Bruno kick), Drive: 6 plays, 79 yards, 0:00	7–7
1	1:35	Stephen F. Austin	Braxton Bearden 55 yard pass from Hunter Taylor (Nick Bruno kick), Drive: 3 plays, 57 yards, 1:28	7–14
2	10:17	McNeese State	David Bush 22 yard pass from Daniel Sams (Trent Manuel Kick), Drive: 13 plays, 75 yards, 6:13	14–14
2	5:11	McNeese State	Kent Shelby 5 yard pass from Grant Ashcraft (Trent Manuel kick), Drive: 10 plays, 64 yards, 3:28	21–14
4	6:05	McNeese State	Daniel Sams 76 yard run (Trent Manuel kick), Drive: 3 plays, 80 yards, 1:33	28–14

=== Mississippi College ===
Mississippi College at McNeese State

Team	1	2	3	4	Total
Choctaws	0	0	0	0	0
• #25 Cowboys	13	7	10	7	37

- Date: September 26
- Location: Cowboy Stadium
  Lake Charles, LA
- Game start: 6:00 PM CDT
- Elapsed time: 2:40
- Game attendance: 10,436
- Game weather: 75°F • Overcast 86% • SSE 2 mph
- Referee: Michael VanderVelde
- Television network: All Access Cowboy Insider

Scoring summary
1	7:56	McNeese State	Derrick Milton 4 yard run (Trent Manuel kick failed), Drive: 7 plays, 60 yards, TOP 2:39	6–0
1	3:57	McNeese State	Kent Shelby 40 yard pass from Daniel Sams (Trent Manuel kick), Drive: 3 plays, 52 yards, 1:15	13–0
2	14:26	McNeese State	David Bush 22 yard pass from Daniel Sams (Trent Manuel kick), Drive: 6 plays, 70 yards, 2:51	20–0
3	8:26	McNeese State	Trent Manuel 43 yard field goal, Drive: 11 plays, 33 yards, 4:20	23–0
3	3:43	McNeese State	Ryan Ross 2 yard run (Trent Manuel kick), Drive: 6 plays, 56 yards, 2:44	30–0
4	9:56	McNeese State	Grant Ashcraft 5 yard run (Trent Manuel kick), Drive: 11 plays, 76 yards, 4:55	37–0

=== @ Nicholls ===
McNeese State at Nicholls

Team	1	2	3	4	Total
• #23 Cowboys	7	20	7	3	37
Colonels	0	7	0	0	7

- Date: October 3
- Location: John L. Guidry Stadium
  Thibodaux, LA
- Game start: 3:00 PM CDT
- Elapsed time: 3:03
- Game attendance: 6,192
- Game weather: 76°F • Clear • NNW 11 mph
- Referee: Kevin Hassell
- Television network: CST

Scoring summary
1	8:25	McNeese State	Tavarious Battiste 34 yard pass from Daniel Sams (Trent Manuel kick), Drive: 6 plays, 66 yards, 2:32	7–0
2	10:53	McNeese State	Ryan Ross 6 yard run (Trent Manuel kick failed), Drive: 11 plays, 53 yards, 5:22	13–0
2	1:51	McNeese State	Daniel Sams 4 yard run (Jean Breaux kick), Drive: 14 plays, 90 yards, 6:49	20–0
2	1:31	McNeese State	Kent Shelby 49 yard pass from David Bush (Jean Breaux kick), Drive: 1 play, 49 yards, 0:12	27–0
2	0:27	Nicholls	Damion Jeanpiere 52 yard pass from Tuskani Figaro (Francisco Condado kick), Drive: 5 plays, 70 yards, 1:04	27–7
3	6:13	McNeese State	Anthony Yruegas 0 yard fumble return (Jean Breaux kick), Drive: 2 plays, -20 yards, 0:25	34–7
4	7:03	McNeese State	Trent Manuel 36 yard field goal, Drive: 10 plays, 42 yards, 4:41	37–7

=== Southeastern Louisiana ===
Southeastern Louisiana at McNeese State

Team	1	2	3	4	Total
#20 Lions	0	7	0	0	7
• #22 Cowboys	14	7	0	0	21

- Date: October 10
- Location: Cowboy Stadium
  Lake Charles, LA
- Game start: 6:00 PM CDT
- Elapsed time: 3:13
- Game attendance: 13,110
- Game weather: 80°F • NNW 6 • Sunny and warm
- Referee: Ross Smith
- Television network: CST/ESPN3

Scoring summary
1	9:57	McNeese State	Daniel Sams 3 yard run (Trent Manuel kick), Drive: 10 plays, 86 yards, 5:03	7–0
1	5:00	McNeese State	Ryan Ross 58 yard run, (Trent Manuel kick), Drive: 7 plays, 94 yards, 3:19	14–0
2	13:08	Southeastern Louisiana	Xavier Roberson 1 yard run (Jonathon Tatum kick), Drive: 3 plays, 57 yards, 1:04	14–7
2	1:27	McNeese State	Ryan Ross 4 yard run (Trent Manuel kick), Drive: 8 plays, 69 yards, 3:39	21–7

=== @ Central Arkansas ===
McNeese State at Central Arkansas

Team	1	2	3	4	Total
• #15 Cowboys	0	0	7	21	28
Bears	0	3	10	0	13

- Date: October 17
- Location: Estes Stadium
  Conway, AR
- Game start: 6:00 PM CDT
- Elapsed time: 3:27
- Game attendance: 10,527
- Game weather: 66°F • Clear
- Referee: Kevin Boitmann
- Television network: ESPN3

Scoring summary
2	3:13	Central Arkansas	Jace Denker 42 yard field goal, Drive: 4 plays, 1 yard, 0:43	0–3
3	12:22	McNeese State	Daniel Sams 5 yard run (Trent Manuel kick), Drive: 3 plays, 46 yards, 1:08	7–3
3	6:42	Central Arkansas	Dominique Thomas 1 yard run (Jace Denker kick), Drive: 12 plays, 78 yards, 5:32	7–10
3	3:13	Central Arkansas	Jace Denker 44 yard field goal, Drive: 6 plays, 52 yards, 2:08	7–13
4	14:50	McNeese State	Wallace Scott 45 yard fumble return (Trent Manuel kick), Drive: 5 plays, 10 yards, 2:16	14–13
4	9:47	McNeese State	Ryan Ross 10 yard run (Trent Manuel Kick), Drive: 7 plays, 46 yards, 3:24	21–13
4	6:56	McNeese State	Daniel Sams 2 yard run (Trent Manuel kick), Drive: 5 plays, 16 yards, 1:56	28–13

=== Northwestern State (homecoming) ===
Northwestern State at McNeese State

Team	1	2	3	4	Total
Demons	7	3	10	7	27
• #12 Cowboys	7	7	13	20	47

- Date: October 24
- Location: Cowboy Stadium
  Lake Charles, LA
- Game start: 6:00 PM CDT
- Elapsed time: 3:28
- Game attendance: 9,806
- Game weather: 73°F • NE 8 • Cloudy, 40% rain
- Referee: Kevin Hassell
- Television network: CST

Scoring summary
1	14:47	Northwestern State	Ed Eagan 97 yard kickoff return (Chris Moore kick)	0–7
1	4:22	McNeese State	Daniel Sams 1 yard run (Trent Manuel kick), Drive: 12 plays, 58 yards, 5:22	7–7
2	14:56	McNeese State	Tavarious Battiste 29 yard pass from Daniel Sams (Trent Manuel kick), Drive: 8 plays, 62 yards, 3:19	14–7
2	7:45	Northwestern State	Chris Moore 20 yard field goal, Drive: 16 plays, 74 yards, 7:11	14–10
3	14:40	McNeese State	Kent Shelby 73 yard pass from Daniel Sams (Jean Breaux kick), Drive: 1 play, 73 yards, 0:20	21–10
3	14:24	Northwestern State	Joel Blumenthal 62 yard run (Chris Moore kick), Drive: 1 play, 62 yards, 0:29	21–17
3	5:45	Northwestern State	Chris Moore 44 yard field goal, Drive: 11 plays, 44 yards, 4:33	21–20
3	2:17	McNeese State	Ryan Ross 2 yard run (Jean Breaux kick failed), Drive: 7 plays, 65 yards, 3:28	27–20
4	14:53	Northwestern State	Tuff McClain 42 yard pass from Stephen Rivers (Chris Moore kick), Drive: 5 plays, 73 yards, 2:24	27–27
4	12:42	McNeese State	Daniel Sams 52 yard run (Jean Breaux kick), Drive: 4 plays, 65 yards, 2:11	34–27
4	5:25	McNeese State	Austin Nelson 2 yard pass from Daniel Sams (Jean Breaux kick blocked), Drive: 5 plays, 49 yards, 2:35	40–27
4	2:19	McNeese State	Ryan Ross 1 yard run (Jean Breaux kick), Drive: 5 plays, 15 yards, 2:51	47–27

=== @ Abilene Christian ===
McNeese State at Abilene Christian

Team	1	2	3	4	Total
• #10 Cowboys	3	3	6	3	15
Wildcats	0	6	0	7	13

- Date: October 31
- Location: Shotwell Stadium
  Abilene, TX
- Game start: 2:00 PM CDT
- Elapsed time: 3:20
- Game attendance: 3,567
- Game weather: 65°F • NNW 13 • Sunny
- Referee: Marvel July
- Television network: ASN

Scoring summary
1	9:25	McNeese State	Trent Manuel 28 yard field goal, Drive: 8 plays, 24 yards, 4:25	3–0
2	6:18	Abilene Christian	Dallas Sealey 9 yard pass from Herschel Sims (Zach Lehr kick blocked), Drive: 5 plays, 17 yards, 2:02	3–6
2	0:00	McNeese State	Trent Manuel 27 yard field goal, Drive: 10 plays, 68 yards, 1:36	6–6
3	10:37	McNeese State	Daniel Sams 2 yard run (Trent Manuel kick blocked), Drive: 9 plays, 69 yards, 4:16	12–6
4	4:31	McNeese State	Trent Manuel 23 yard field goal, Drive: 6 plays, 9 yards, 3:36	15–6
4	3:54	Abilene Christian	Carl Whitley 24 yard pass from Dallas Sealey (Zach Lehr kick), Drive: 2 plays, 75 yards, 0:37	15–13

=== Sam Houston State ===
Sam Houston State at McNeese State

Team	1	2	3	4	Total
#7 Bearkats	10	0	0	0	10
• #9 Cowboys	0	14	3	10	27

- Date: November 7
- Location: Cowboy Stadium
  Lake Charles, LA
- Game start: 7:00 PM CST
- Elapsed time: 2:58
- Game attendance: 10,501
- Game weather: 64°F • NNE 13 • Overcast with rain
- Referee: Daniel Romeo
- Television network: ESPN3

Scoring summary
1	9:38	Sam Houston State	Darion Flowers 90 yard interception return (Tre Honshtein kick), Drive: 11 plays, 67 yards, 5:22	0–7
1	0:54	Sam Houston State	Tre Honshtein 20 yard field goal, Drive: 7 plays, 95 yards, 2:06	0–10
2	1:40	McNeese State	Daniel Sams 64 yard run (Jean Breaux kick), Drive: 2 plays, 64 yards, 0:37	7–10
2	0:04	McNeese State	Kent Shelby 6 yard pass from Daniel Sams (Jean Breaux kick), Drive: 8 plays, 70 yards, 1:06	14–10
3	3:48	McNeese State	Jean Breaux 23 yard field goal, Drive: 11 plays, 81 yards, 4:53	17–10
4	5:20	McNeese State	Jean Breaux 27 yard field goal, Drive: 10 plays, 59 yards, 5:09	20–10
4	5:11	McNeese State	Ryan Ross 20 yard run (Jean Breaux Kick), Drive: 1 play, 20 yards, 0:09	27–10

=== @ Lamar ===
McNeese State at Lamar

Team	1	2	3	4	Total
• #3 Cowboys	17	0	0	3	20
Cardinals	7	0	0	7	14

- Date: November 21
- Location: Provost Umphrey Stadium
  Beaumont, TX
- Game start: 6:00 PM CST
- Elapsed time: 3:11
- Game attendance: 9,808
- Game weather: 62°F • 17 mph • Cloudy and Windy
- Referee: Randy Christal
- Television network: ESPN3

Scoring summary
1	11:59	McNeese State	Jean Breaux 32 yard field goal Drive: 5 plays, 22 yards, 1:49	3–0
1	6:19	Lamar	Dedrick Garner 66 yard fumble recovery (Alex Ball kick)	3–7
1	5:30	McNeese State	Ryan Ross 26 yard run (Jean Breaux kick), Drive: 3 plays, 75 yards, 0:49	10–7
1	00:36	McNeese State	Daniel Sams 32 yard run (Jean Breaux kick), Drive: 6 plays, 67 yards, 3:04	17–7
4	8:46	McNeese State	Jean Breaux 31 yard field goal Drive: 8 plays, 35 yards, 3:48	20–7
4	4:42	Lamar	Devonn Brown 32 yard pass from Joe Minden (Alex Ball kick), Drive: 3 plays, 45 yards, 0:33	20–14

=== Sam Houston State—NCAA Division I Second Round ===
Sam Houston State at McNeese State

Team	1	2	3	4	Total
• #6 Bearkats	7	17	10	0	34
#3 Cowboys	10	7	6	6	29

- Date: December 5
- Location: Cowboy Stadium
  Lake Charles, LA
- Game start: 7:00 PM CST
- Elapsed time: 3:33
- Game attendance: 13,493
- Game weather: 57°F • ENE 3 • Fair, 45% humidity
- Referee: Jeremy Parker
- Television network: ESPN3

Scoring summary
1	11:58	McNeese State	Jean Breaux 43 yard field goal Drive: 4 plays, 4 yards, 1:23	3–0
1	4:08	Sam Houston State	LaDarius Brown 54 yard pass from Jeremiah Briscoe (Tre Honshtein kick) Drive: 4 plays, 70 yards, 1:04	3–7
1	0:39	McNeese State	Kent Shelby 15 yard pass from Daniel Sams (Jean Breaux kick) Drive: 8 plays, 67 yards, 3:29	10–7
2	13:32	McNeese State	David Bush 4 yard pass from Daniel Sams (Jean Breaux kick) Drive: 5 plays, 27 yards, 1:34	17–7
2	9:38	Sam Houston State	Corey Avery 1 yard run (Tre Honshtein kick) Drive: 9 plays, 42 yards, 3:54	17–14
2	4:30	Sam Houston State	Yedidiah Louis 22 yard pass from Jeremiah Briscoe (Tre Honshtein kick) Drive: 10 plays, 86 yards, 3:11	17–21
2	0:00	Sam Houston State	Tre Honshtein 47 yard field goal, Drive: 12 plays, 51 yards, 1:58	17–24
3	9:01	Sam Houston State	Tre Honshtein 24 yard field goal, Drive: 10 plays, 60 yards, 3:31	17–27
3	2:22	McNeese State	Zach Hetrick 3 yard pass from Daniel Sams (Jean Breaux kick blocked), Drive: 8 plays, 66 yards, 3:58	23–27
3	1:21	Sam Houston State	Yedidiah Louis 28 yard pass from Jeremiah Briscoe (Tre Honshtein kick), Drive: 5 plays, 50 yards, 1:01	23–34
4	11:20	McNeese State	Tavarious Battiste 43 yard pass from Daniel Sams (two-point conv. failed), Drive: 7 plays, 51 yards, 3:33	29–34

== Ranking movements ==
Ranking movements Legend: ██ Increase in ranking ██ Decrease in ranking RV = Received votes т = Tied with team above or below ( ) = First-place votes
	Week													
Poll	Pre	1	2	3	4	5	6	7	8	9	10	11	12	Final
STATS FCS	25	RV	RV	25	23	22	15	12	10	9	3	3	3	7
Coaches	23	23	21	17	15	13	9	9	7	5–T	2 (1)	2 (2)	2 (1)	9
