= List of South Atlantic Conference football standings =

This is a list of yearly South Atlantic Conference football standings.

== South Atlantic standings ==
2012 South Atlantic Conference football standings
	Conf.			Overall
Team	W		L	W		L
No. 20 Lenoir–Rhyne $^	6	–	1	9	–	3
No. 13 Carson–Newman ^	5	–	2	9	–	3
Mars Hill	5	–	2	6	–	4
Wingate	5	–	2	6	–	5
Newberry	3	–	4	5	–	6
Catawba	2	–	5	4	–	7
Brevard	1	–	6	2	–	9
Tusculum	1	–	6	2	–	9
$ – Conference champion; ^ – NCAA Division II playoff participant; Rankings from AFCA Poll

2013 South Atlantic Conference football standings
	Conf.			Overall
Team	W		L	W		L
No. 2 Lenoir–Rhyne $^	7	–	0	13	–	2
No. 17 Carson–Newman ^	5	–	2	10	–	3
No. 23 Newberry ^	5	–	2	9	–	3
Catawba	3	–	4	6	–	5
Wingate	3	–	4	4	–	6
Tusculum	2	–	5	4	–	7
Brevard	2	–	5	3	–	8
Mars Hill	1	–	6	3	–	8
$ – Conference champion; ^ – NCAA Division II playoff participant; Rankings from AFCA Poll

2014 South Atlantic Conference football standings
	Conf.			Overall
Team	W		L	W		L
No. 8 Lenoir–Rhyne $^	7	–	0	11	–	1
Carson–Newman	5	–	2	7	–	3
Tusculum	4	–	3	6	–	5
Catawba	3	–	4	6	–	5
Wingate	3	–	4	6	–	5
Newberry	3	–	4	5	–	6
Mars Hill	3	–	4	4	–	6
Brevard	0	–	7	1	–	10
$ – Conference champion; ^ – NCAA Division II playoff participant; Rankings from AFCA poll

2015 South Atlantic Conference football standings
	Conf.			Overall
Team	W		L	W		L
No. 25 Catawba $^	6	–	1	9	–	3
No. 21 Carson–Newman ^	5	–	2	9	–	3
Mars Hill	5	–	2	6	–	5
Newberry ^	4	–	3	7	–	5
Wingate	3	–	4	6	–	5
Lenoir–Rhyne	3	–	4	5	–	5
Tusculum	2	–	5	4	–	7
Brevard	0	–	7	0	–	11
$ – Conference champion; ^ – NCAA Division II playoff participant; Rankings from AFCA Poll

2016 South Atlantic Conference football standings
	Conf.			Overall
Team	W		L	W		L
No. 16 Newberry $^	7	–	0	10	–	2
Wingate	5	–	2	8	–	3
Catawba	5	–	2	5	–	6
Mars Hill	3	–	4	5	–	6
Tusculum	3	–	4	4	–	7
Lenoir–Rhyne	3	–	4	3	–	8
Carson–Newman	2	–	5	4	–	7
Brevard	0	–	7	1	–	10
$ – Conference champion; ^ – NCAA Division II playoff participant; Rankings from AFCA Poll
