= Gladden =

Gladden means to bring happiness or to become happier. It may also refer to:

== Places in the United States ==
- Gladden, Missouri, an unincorporated community
- Gladden Creek, Missouri
- Gladden Farm, a historic home and farm complex in Maryland
- Gladden Windmill, a historic windmill in Napoli, New York

== Other uses ==
- Gladden (name), a list of people with either the given name or surname
- Gladden (Middle-earth), a fictional Middle-earth river
- Gladden, an Intel embedded processor - see List of Intel Pentium processors
- Gladden Products Corp., a historical manufacturer of WWII aircraft parts, Mustang motorcycle a.k.a. Mustang Scooter, and small gasoline engines for farm equipment, snowblowers, and the original motor for Disneyland Autopia cars.

== See also ==
- Carrack Gladden, a coastal headland in St Ives Bay in Cornwall
- Gladden Fields, a fictional location in J. R. R. Tolkien's Middle-earth
- Beth Gladen, American biostatistician
