= Gladden (name) =

Gladden is both a surname and a given name. Notable people with the name include:

== Surname ==
- Adley H. Gladden (1810–1862), Confederate brigadier general in the American Civil War
- Alicia Gladden (1985–2013), American women's basketball player
- Eddie Gladden (1937-2003), American jazz drummer
- Dan Gladden (born 1957), American former Major League Baseball player
- Hannah Gladden (born 1996), American wrestler
- Lisa Gladden (born 1964), American politician
- Lynn Gladden, British chemical engineer
- Mack Gladden (1909–1985), American football player and coach
- Texas Gladden (1895-1967), American folk singer
- Washington Gladden (1836-1918), American Congregational church pastor

== Given name ==
- Gladden Bishop (1809—1864), a minor leader in the Latter Day Saint movement
- Gladden Dye (born c. 1934), former head football coach of the Northwest Missouri State University Bearcats
- Gladden James (1888–1948), American film actor
