= M. H. Sims =

American football and basketball coach

Coaching career (HC unless noted)

Football
- 1918: Maryville Normal

Basketball
- 1918–1919: Maryville Normal

Head coaching record
- Overall: 1–1 (football)

M. H. Sims was an American college football and college basketball coach. He was the third head football coach at Northwest Missouri State University in Maryville, Missouri. He was appointed in the place of George Palfreyman in 1918, and compiled a record of 1–1. Milner was also the head basketball coach at Northwest Missouri State for the 1918–19 season.

== Head coaching record ==
=== Football ===
Year	Team	Overall	Conference	Standing	Bowl/playoffs
Maryville Normal Bearcats (Missouri Intercollegiate Athletic Association) (1918)
1918	Maryville Normal	1–1			
Maryville Normal:		1–1			
Total:		1–1			
