= Northwest Missouri State Bearcats men's basketball =

- University: Northwest Missouri State University
- First season: 1914
- Head coach: Matt Keeley (2nd season)
- Location: Maryville, Missouri
- Arena: Bearcat Arena (capacity: 2,500)
- Conference: The MIAA
- Nickname: Bearcats
- Colors: Bearcat green and white
- All-time record: 1,651–1,010 (.620)

NCAA Division II tournament champions
- 2017, 2019, 2021, 2022
Other NCAA Division II tournament results
Final Four	2017, 2019, 2021, 2022
Elite Eight	2002, 2004, 2017, 2019, 2021, 2022
Sweet Sixteen	2002, 2004, 2014, 2015, 2016, 2017, 2019, 2021, 2022, 2024
Appearances	1982, 1984, 1989, 1998, 2000, 2001, 2002, 2003, 2004, 2006, 2007, 2008, 2012, 2014, 2015, 2016, 2017, 2018, 2019, 2020, 2021, 2022, 2023, 2024

Conference tournament champions
- 1989, 2002, 2004, 2008, 2016, 2017, 2018, 2019, 2020, 2022, 2023, 2024

Conference regular-season champions
- 1925, 1926, 1928, 1929, 1939, 1945, 1986, 1997, 2001, 2006, 2011, 2014, 2015, 2016, 2017, 2018, 2019, 2020, 2021, 2022, 2023, 2024

Uniforms
Home	Away

The Northwest Missouri State Bearcats men's basketball team represents Northwest Missouri State University in Maryville, Missouri, in the NCAA Division II men's basketball competition. The team is currently coached by Matt Keeley, who has been at the helm since 2024. The Bearcats currently compete, and are one of two founding members remaining, of the Mid-America Intercollegiate Athletics Association (MIAA). The basketball team plays its home games in the Bearcat Arena on campus.

== National championship games ==
The men's team in its first national championship appearance in 1932 lost to Henry's Clothiers in the Amateur Athletic Union title game at Convention Hall in Kansas City, Missouri 15–14 in a last second shot. The Bearcat team was coached by Hank Iba. The featured Bearcat players included Jack McCracken and Wilbur Stalcup. At the time both corporate-sponsored teams and colleges competed in the same tournament.

The Bearcats played Fairmont State University in the national championship game on March 25, 2017, in Sioux Falls, South Dakota, winning 71–61.

The Bearcats won their second national championship when they played Point Loma Nazarene University in the national championship game on March 30, 2019, in Evansville, Indiana, winning 64-58.

Northwest was ranked #1 in 2020 going into the NCAA Division II men's tournament to defend its title but the tournament was canceled due to the COVID-19 pandemic in the United States.

The Bearcats won their third national championship when they played West Texas A&M in the national championship game on March 27, 2021, in Evansville, Indiana, winning 80-54.

== Bearcat Arena ==
Bearcat Arena has a seating capacity of 2,500. The facility also houses the university's commencement ceremonies, as well professional concerts. Bearcat Arena, formerly known as Lamkin Gymnasium, was built in 1959 and underwent a $6 million renovation during the 1993–94 academic year with additions. The south side received a new face which included a fitness center and coaches' offices on the second floor.

== Year-by-year results ==
Statistics overview
Northwest Missouri State men's basketball — year-by-year record
Season	Team	Overall	Conference	Standing	Postseason
Carl Hanson (Missouri Intercollegiate Athletic Association) (1914–1915)
1914–15	Carl Hanson	6–2			
Carl Hanson:		6–2			
George Palfreyman (Missouri Intercollegiate Athletic Association) (1915–1918)
1915–16	George Palfreyman	7–5			
1916–17	George Palfreyman	6–2			
1917–18	George Palfreyman	6–3			
George Palfreyman:		19–10			
M. H. Sims (Missouri Intercollegiate Athletic Association) (1918–1919)
1918–19	M. H. Sims	6–4			
M. H. Sims:		6–4			
Robert Rice (Missouri Intercollegiate Athletic Association) (1919–1921)
1919–20	Robert Rice	2–7			
1920–21	Robert Rice	3–4			
Robert Rice:		5–11			
Russell Sprong (Missouri Intercollegiate Athletic Association) (1921–1922)
1921–22	Russell Sprong	0–15			
Russell Sprong:		0–15			
Eugene Maynor (Missouri Intercollegiate Athletic Association) (1922–1923)
1922–23	Eugene Maynor	7–7			
Eugene Maynor:		7–7			
H. Frank Lawrence (Missouri Intercollegiate Athletic Association) (1923–1929)
1923–24	H. Frank Lawrence	5–5			
1924–25	H. Frank Lawrence	9–8			
1925–26	H. Frank Lawrence	12–7			
1926–27	H. Frank Lawrence	11–7			
1927–28	H. Frank Lawrence	12–7			
1928–29	H. Frank Lawrence	13–8			
H. Frank Lawrence:		62–42			
Henry Iba (Missouri Intercollegiate Athletic Association) (1929–1933)
1929–30	Henry Iba	31–0			
1930–31	Henry Iba	31–6			
1931–32	Henry Iba	20–2			
1932–33	Henry Iba	12–7			
Henry Iba:		94–15			
Wilbur Stalcup (Missouri Intercollegiate Athletic Association) (1933–1943)
1933–34	Wilbur Stalcup	8–6			
1934–35	Wilbur Stalcup	10–8			
1935–36	Wilbur Stalcup	11–7			
1936–37	Wilbur Stalcup	13–4			
1937–38	Wilbur Stalcup	15–6			
1938–39	Wilbur Stalcup	11–7			
1939–40	Wilbur Stalcup	20–1			
1940–41	Wilbur Stalcup	18–5			
1941–42	Wilbur Stalcup	14–6			
1942–43	Wilbur Stalcup	18–7			
Wilbur Stalcup:		138–57			
Ryland Milner (Missouri Intercollegiate Athletic Association) (1943–1951)
1943–44	Ryland Milner	5–8			
1944–45	Ryland Milner	10–6			
1945–46	Ryland Milner	12–3			
1946–47	Ryland Milner	8–8			
1947–48	Ryland Milner	4–14			
1948–49	Ryland Milner	13–12			
1949–50	Ryland Milner	15–9			
1950–51	Ryland Milner	11–11			
Ryland Milner:		78–71			
H. D. Peterson (Missouri Intercollegiate Athletic Association) (1951–1953)
1951–52	H. D. Peterson	9–10			
1952–53	H. D. Peterson	7–13			
H. D. Peterson:		16–23			
Dale Kessinger (Missouri Intercollegiate Athletic Association) (1953–1955)
1953–54	Dale Kessinger	8–12			
1954–55	Dale Kessinger	10–10			
Dale Kessinger:		18–22			
Robert Gregory (Missouri Intercollegiate Athletic Association) (1955–1959)
1955–56	Robert Gregory	5–15			
1956–57	Robert Gregory	8–13			
1957–58	Robert Gregory	4–16			
1958–59	Robert Gregory	10–10			
Robert Gregory:		27–54			
Marion Moss (Missouri Intercollegiate Athletic Association) (1959–1964)
1959–60	Marion Moss	15–8			
1960–61	Marion Moss	14–6			
1961–62	Marion Moss	7–14			
1962–63	Marion Moss	12–11			
1963–64	Marion Moss	5–18			
Marion Moss:		53–57			
Dick Buckridge (Missouri Intercollegiate Athletic Association) (1964–1972)
1964–65	Dick Buckridge	2–20			
1965–66	Dick Buckridge	10–13			
1966–67	Dick Buckridge	7–16			
1967–68	Dick Buckridge	8–13			
1968–69	Dick Buckridge	11–11			
1969–70	Dick Buckridge	17–8			
1970–71	Dick Buckridge	14–10			
1971–72	Dick Buckridge	8–18			
Dick Buckridge:		77–109			
Bob Iglehart (Missouri Intercollegiate Athletic Association) (1972–1977)
1972–73	Bob Iglehart	12–13			
1973–74	Bob Iglehart	12–13			
1974–75	Bob Iglehart	6–18			
1975–76	Bob Iglehart	7–17			
1976–77	Bob Iglehart	11–16			
Larry Holley:		48–77			
Larry Holley (Missouri Intercollegiate Athletic Association) (1977–1980)
1977–78	Larry Holley	11–15			
1978–79	Larry Holley	15–11			
1979–80	Larry Holley	16–11			
Larry Holley:		42–37			
Lionel Sinn (Missouri Intercollegiate Athletic Association) (1980–1989)
1980–81	Lionel Sinn	13–14			
1981–82	Lionel Sinn	20–10			NCAA Division II 1st Round
1982–83	Lionel Sinn	17–11			
1983–84	Lionel Sinn	24–7			NCAA Division II 1st Round
1984–85	Lionel Sinn	17–10			
1985–86	Lionel Sinn	18–10			
1986–87	Lionel Sinn	19–10			
1987–88	Lionel Sinn	20–8			
1988–89	Lionel Sinn	21–9			NCAA Division II 1st Round
Lionel Sinn:		169–89			
Steve Tappmeyer (Mid-America Intercollegiate Athletics Association) (1989–2009)
1989–90	Steve Tappmeyer	14–13			
1990–91	Steve Tappmeyer	12–15			
1991–92	Steve Tappmeyer	16–12			
1992–93	Steve Tappmeyer	14–13			
1993–94	Steve Tappmeyer	18–10			
1994–95	Steve Tappmeyer	13–14			
1995–96	Steve Tappmeyer	19–7			
1996–97	Steve Tappmeyer	11–16			
1997–98	Steve Tappmeyer	23–7			NCAA Division II 1st Round
1998–99	Steve Tappmeyer	19–10			
1999–2000	Steve Tappmeyer	22–8			NCAA Division II 1st Round
2000–01	Steve Tappmeyer	25–6			NCAA Division II 1st Round
2001–02	Steve Tappmeyer	29–3			NCAA Division II Elite 8
2002–03	Steve Tappmeyer	22–9			NCAA Division II 1st Round
2003–04	Steve Tappmeyer	29–5			NCAA Division II Elite 8
2004–05	Steve Tappmeyer	19–11	9–9		
2005–06	Steve Tappmeyer	22–10	10–6		NCAA Division II 1st Round
2006–07	Steve Tappmeyer	24–7	15–3		NCAA Division II 1st Round
2007–08	Steve Tappmeyer	24–8	12–6		NCAA Division II 1st Round
2008–09	Steve Tappmeyer	12–15	7–13		
Steve Tappmeyer:		387–199			
Ben McCollum (Mid-America Intercollegiate Athletics Association) (2009–2024)
2009–10	Ben McCollum	12–15	7–13		
2010–11	Ben McCollum	10–16	8–14		
2011–12	Ben McCollum	22–7	15–5		NCAA Division II 1st Round
2012–13	Ben McCollum	21–10	11–7		
2013–14	Ben McCollum	24–9	16–3		NCAA Division II Sweet 16
2014–15	Ben McCollum	25–7	15–4		NCAA Division II Sweet 16
2015–16	Ben McCollum	27–6	19–3		NCAA Division II Sweet 16
2016–17	Ben McCollum	35–1	18–1		NCAA Division II National Champion
2017–18	Ben McCollum	27–4	16–3		NCAA Division II 1st Round
2018–19	Ben McCollum	38–0	19–0		NCAA Division II National Champion
2019–20	Ben McCollum	31–1	18–1		
2020–21	Ben McCollum	28–2	21–1		NCAA Division II National Champion
2021–22	Ben McCollum	34–5	18–4		NCAA Division II National Champion
2022–23	Ben McCollum	31–3	20–2		NCAA Division II 2nd Round
2023–24	Ben McCollum	29–5	20–2		NCAA Division II Sweet 16
Ben McCollum:		394–91	241–63		
Matt Keeley (Mid-America Intercollegiate Athletics Association) (2024–present)
2024–25	Matt Keeley	4–18	2–11		
Matt Keeley:		4–18	2–11		
Total:		1,651–1,010			
National champion Postseason invitational champion Conference regular season champion Conference regular season and conference tournament champion Division regular season champion Division regular season and conference tournament champion Conference tournament champion
