= Vern Thomsen =

American football coach (1940–2023)

Biographical details
- Born: March 19, 1940; York County, Nebraska, U.S.
- Died: December 16, 2023 (aged 83); Papillion, Nebraska, U.S.

Playing career

Football
- 1957–1958: Fairbury
- 1959–1960: Peru State
- 1965: Lincoln Comets
- Positions: Tackle, defensive tackle

Coaching career (HC unless noted)

Football
- 1965–1966: Weeping Water HS (NE)
- 1967–1971: Wahoo HS (NE)
- 1973: Nebraska Southern
- 1974–1975: Ellsworth (assistant)
- 1976–1982: Ellsworth
- 1983–1987: Northwest Missouri State
- c. 1988–1990: Scottsdale (line)
- 1991–1995: Iowa Central

Track and field
- 1973–1974: Nebraska Southern

Head coaching record
- Overall: 24–31–1 (college football); 88–38–1 (junior college football)
- Bowls: 3–1 (junior college)
- Tournaments: Football; 0–1 (NCAA D-II playoffs)

Accomplishments and honors

Championships
- Football; 1 NJCAA National (1976); 4 Iowa Juco (1976–1977, 1979, 1981); 1 MIAA (1984)

Vernon Royce Thomsen (March 19, 1940 – December 16, 2023) was an American football coach. He served as the head football coach at Northwest Missouri State University in Maryville, Missouri for five seasons, from 1983 to 1987, compiling a record of 24–31–1. Thomsen was the head football coach at three junior colleges, Nebaska Southern College in Fairbury, Nebraska, Ellsworth Community College in Iowa Falls, Iowa from 1976 to 1982, and Iowa Central Community College in Fort Dodge, Iowa from 1991 to 1995.

Thomsen was born on March 19, 1940, York County, Nebraska to Frederick Wilhelm and Anna Due Thomsen. He graduated in 1957 from Exeter High School in Exeter, Nebraska. He then attended Fairbury Junior College (now part of Southeast Community College) and Peru State Teachers College. In 1970, Thomsen earned a master's degree from the University of Nebraska–Lincoln.

Thomsen spent one season, in 1973, as head football coach Nebraska Southern College, guiding his team to a record of 6–3. He also coached track and field at Nebraska Southern before resigning in 1974. He led his teams at Ellsworth to a record of 56–12–1 in seven seasons and a NJCAA National Football Championship in 1976. He resigned from his post at Northwest Missouri State after a 2–7–1 season in 1987, and went into the real estate business in Phoenix, Arizona. While in Arizona, Thomsen was line coach for the football team at Scottsdale Community College in Scottsdale, Arizona. He returned to Iowa in 1991 as head football coach at Iowa Central. He had a record of 26–23 in five seasons at Iowa Central before resigning after the 1995 season.

Thomsen died on December 16, 2023, at Papillion Manor in Papillion, Nebraska.

== Head coaching record ==
=== College football ===
Year	Team	Overall	Conference	Standing	Bowl/playoffs	NCAA^{#}
Northwest Missouri State Bearcats (Missouri Intercollegiate Athletic Association) (1983–1987)
1983	Northwest Missouri State	5–6	2–3	4th		
1984	Northwest Missouri State	10–2	5–0	1st	L NCAA Division II First Round	5
1985	Northwest Missouri State	4–6–1	2–3	T–3rd		
1986	Northwest Missouri State	2–9	1–4	5th		
1987	Northwest Missouri State	3–8	1–4	5th		
Northwest Missouri State:		24–31–1	11–14			
Total:		24–31–1				
National championship Conference title Conference division title or championship game berth

=== Junior college football ===
Year	Team	Overall	Conference	Standing	Bowl/playoffs	NJCAA^{#}
Nebraska Southern Bombers (Independent) (1973)
1973	Nebraska Southern	6–3				
Nebraska Southern:		6–3				
Ellsworth Panthers (Iowa Junior College Conference) (1976–1982)
1976	Ellsworth	9–1	7–0	1st	L Junior Rose Bowl	
1977	Ellsworth	9–1	8–1	1st		2
1978	Ellsworth	6–3	5–3	2nd		4
1979	Ellsworth	10–0	8–0	1st	W Coca-Cola Bowl	2
1980	Ellsworth	8–2	6–2	2nd	W Rodeo Bowl	7
1981	Ellsworth	8–2	5–1	1st	W RC Cola Bowl	5
1982	Ellsworth	6–3–1	4–2	2nd		
Ellsworth:		56–12–1	43–9			
Iowa Central Tritons (Iowa Junior College Conference) (1991–1995)
1991	Iowa Central					
1992	Iowa Central					
1993	Iowa Central	5–4	3–3	T–4th		
1994	Iowa Central	7–3				
1995	Iowa Central	4–6	2–4	T–5th		
Iowa Central:		26–23				
Total:		88–38–1				
National championship Conference title Conference division title or championship game berth
