= John McMenamin =

American football coach

Current position
- Title: Head coach
- Team: Northwest Missouri State
- Conference: MIAA
- Record: 19–4

Biographical details
- Born: c. 1980 (age 45–46); Omaha, Nebraska, U.S.
- Education: Northwest Missouri State University (2002)

Playing career
- 1998–2002: Northwest Missouri State
- Position: Quarterback

Coaching career (HC unless noted)
- 2004–2005: Omaha Central HS (NE) (OC)
- 2006: Nebraska–Omaha (WR)
- 2007–2008: Nebraska–Omaha (QB)
- 2009–2010: Midland (OC)
- 2011–2014: Wayne State (NE) (OC/QB)
- 2015–2019: Central Missouri (OC)
- 2020–2021: Wayne State (NE)
- 2022: Tulane (PGC/WR)
- 2025–present: Northwest Missouri State

Head coaching record
- Overall: 26–8
- Tournaments: 1–1 (NCAA D-II playoffs)

Accomplishments and honors

Championships
- 2 MIAA (2025, 2026)

John McMenamin (born c. 1980) is an American college football coach. He is the head football coach for Northwest Missouri State University, a position he has held since 2025. He was the head football coach for Wayne State College from 2020 to 2021. He also coached for Omaha Central High School, Nebraska–Omaha, Midland, Central Missouri, and Tulane. He played college football for Northwest Missouri State as a quarterback.

== Head coaching record ==
Year	Team	Overall	Conference	Standing	Bowl/playoffs	AFCA^{#}	D2^{°}
Wayne State Wildcats (Northern Sun Intercollegiate Conference) (2020–2021)
2020–21	No team—COVID-19						
2021	Wayne State	7–4	7–4	T–3rd (South)			
Wayne State:		7–4	7–4				
Northwest Missouri State Bearcats (Mid-America Intercollegiate Athletics Association) (2025–present)
2025	Northwest Missouri State	9–3	8–1	T–1st	L NCAA Division II First Round	17	8
2026	Northwest Missouri State	10–1	8–1	1st			
Northwest Missouri State:		19–4	16–2				
Total:		26–8					
