= Russell Sprong =

American football and basketball coach (1894–1956)

Biographical details
- Born: July 5, 1894; Leavenworth County, Kansas, U.S.
- Died: February 9, 1956 (aged 61)

Playing career

Football
- 1915–1916: Drake
- 1919: Drake
- Position: Center

Coaching career (HC unless noted)

Football
- 1920: Drake (line)
- 1921: Northwest Missouri State
- 1923–1924: Rubidoux Polytechnic HS (MO)
- 1925–?: Long Beach HS (CA)

Basketball
- 1921–1922: Northwest Missouri State

Head coaching record
- Overall: 2–6 (college football); 0–15 (college basketball)

Russell Edwards Sprong (July 4, 1894 – February 9, 1956) was an American football and basketball coach. He was the fifth head football coach at Northwest Missouri State Teacher's College—now known as Northwest Missouri State University—in Maryville, Missouri, serving for one season, in 1921, and compiling a record of 2–6. Sprong was also the head basketball coach at Northwest Missouri State for the 1921–22 season, tallying a mark of 0–15.

Sprong graduated from Des Moines High School in Des Moines, Iowa before he attended Drake University, where he played college football. He was the line coach at Drake in 1920. After his stint at Northwest Missouri State, he was the freshman coach at the University of Kansas, where he also earned a master's degree. Following two years of coaching at Rubidoux Polytechnic High School in St. Joseph, Missouri, Sprong was hired in September 1925 as head football coach and physical education instructor at Long Beach High School in Long Beach, California.

== Head coaching record ==
=== College football ===
| Year | Team | Overall | Conference | Standing | Bowl/playoffs |
|---|---|---|---|---|---|
Northwest Missouri State Bearcats (Missouri Intercollegiate Athletic Association) (1921)
| 1921 | Northwest Missouri State | 2–6 | 1–4 | T–10th | |
| Northwest Missouri State: | | 2–6 | 1–4 | | |
| Total: | | 2–6 | | | |
