= James Redd =

American football player, coach, and administrator (born 1942)

Biographical details
- Born: October 1, 1942 (age 84)

Playing career
- c. 1963: Northwest Missouri State

Coaching career (HC unless noted)
- 1967–1975: Northwest Missouri State (assistant)
- 1976–1982: Northwest Missouri State

Administrative career (AD unless noted)
- 1994–2001: Northwest Missouri State
- 2002–2009: William Jewell

Head coaching record
- Overall: 29–42–2

Accomplishments and honors

Championships
- 1 MIAA (1979)

James C. Redd (born October 1, 1942) is an American former college football coach and athletics administrator. He served as the head football coach at Northwest Missouri State University in Maryville, Missouri for seven seasons, from 1976 to 1982, compiled a record of 29–42–2. Redd was the athletic director at Northwest Missouri State from 1994 to 2001 and William Jewell College in Liberty, Missouri from 2002 to 2009.

A native of St. Louis, Redd attended Christian Brothers College High School in Town and Country, Missouri.

== Head coaching record ==
Year	Team	Overall	Conference	Standing	Bowl/playoffs
Northwest Missouri State Bearcats (Missouri Intercollegiate Athletic Association) (1976–1982)
1976	Northwest Missouri State	8–2	4–2	T–3rd	
1977	Northwest Missouri State	5–5–1	2–3–1	5th	
1978	Northwest Missouri State	0–11	0–6	7th	
1979	Northwest Missouri State	6–5	5–1	1st	
1980	Northwest Missouri State	2–8	1–5	6th	
1981	Northwest Missouri State	6–4	3–2	3rd	
1982	Northwest Missouri State	2–7–1	0–4–1	T–5th	
Northwest Missouri State:		29–42–2	15–23–2		
Total:		29–42–2			
National championship Conference title Conference division title or championship game berth
