= 2013 Central Oklahoma Bronchos football team =

American college football season

2013 Central Oklahoma Bronchos football
- Conference: Mid-America Intercollegiate Athletics Association
- Record: 2–8 (2–8 MIAA)
- Head coach: Nick Bobeck
- Offensive coordinator: Chris Martin
- Defensive coordinator: Russ Pickett
- Home stadium: Wantland Stadium

2013 Mid-America Intercollegiate Athletics Association football standings
	Conf.			Overall
Team	W		L	W		L
No. 1 NW Missouri State $^	10	–	0	15	–	0
No. 20 Emporia State ^	9	–	1	9	–	2
No. 19 Pittsburg State #	7	–	2	10	–	2
Missouri Western	7	–	3	8	–	3
Washburn	7	–	3	8	–	3
Missouri Southern	5	–	3	7	–	3
Central Missouri	5	–	4	6	–	4
Fort Hays State	4	–	5	6	–	5
Nebraska–Kearney	3	–	6	3	–	8
Lindenwood	2	–	6	3	–	6
Lincoln (MO)	2	–	8	3	–	8
Central Oklahoma	2	–	8	2	–	8
Northeastern State	2	–	8	2	–	9
Southwest Baptist	1	–	9	1	–	10
$ – Conference champion; ^ – NCAA Division II playoff participant; # – Mineral Water Bowl participant; Rankings from AFCA poll

The 2013 Central Oklahoma football team represented the University of Central Oklahoma during the 2013 NCAA Division II football season, and the 108th season of Broncho football. The Bronchos played their five home games at Wantland Stadium in Edmond, Oklahoma, which had been Central Oklahoma's home stadium since 1965. The 2013 team was coming off a 2-8 record in 2012. The 2013 team was headed by second year head coach Nick Bobeck. 2013 was the Bronchos 2nd as a member of the Mid-America Intercollegiate Athletics Association (MIAA).

== Preseason outlook ==
The Central Oklahoma Bronchos began the season expected to finish near the bottom of the MIAA; 11th in the media poll and 10th in the coaches poll.

== Media ==
Every Central Oklahoma game was broadcast on KZLS AM 1640 and KNAH 99.7 FM.

== Schedule ==
Date	Time	Opponent	Site	TV	Result	Attendance
September 5	6:00 p.m.	at Missouri Southern	Fred G. Hughes Stadium; Joplin, MO		L 38–58	4,357
September 14	6:00 p.m.	No. 16 Pittsburg State	Wantland Stadium; Edmond, OK		L 24–65	5,100
September 21	6:00 p.m.	Emporia State	Wantland Stadium; Edmond, OK		L 38–54	3,500
September 28	2:37 p.m.	at No. 18 Wasburn	Yager Stadium; Topeka, KS	MIAA Network	L 19–28	4,221
October 5	6:00 p.m.	No. 6 Missouri Western	Wantland Stadium; Edmond, OK		L 30–63	2,000
October 12	1:00 p.m.	at No. 3 Northwest Missouri State	Bearcat Stadium; Maryville, MO		L 10–72	6,359
October 19	1:00 p.m.	Central Missouri	Wantland Stadium; Edmond, OK		L 16–48	1,200
November 2	2:00 p.m.	Lincoln (MO)^{†}	Wantland Stadium; Edmond, OK		W 49–42	4,000
November 9	1:00 p.m.	at Southwest Baptist	Plaster Stadium; Bolivar, MO		W 38–31	1,830
November 16	1:00 p.m.	at Northeastern State	Doc Wadley Stadium; Tahlequah, OK (President's Cup)		L 38–45	1,564
^{†}Homecoming; Rankings from AFCA DII Coaches' Poll released prior to game; All times are in Central time

== Coaching staff ==
Central Oklahoma head coach Nick Bobeck is in his second year as the Bronchos’ head coach for the 2013 season. During his previous year with Central Oklahoma, he led the Bronchos to a record of 2 wins and 8 losses (2–8).

Name	Position	Current Tenure at Central Oklahoma	Alma mater
Nick Bobeck	Head coach	2	Central Oklahoma
Ryan Belsher	Wide Receivers	2	Minot State
Tom Howe	Special Teams	2	Drake
Chris Martin	Offensive coordinator	2	Central Oklahoma
Walter Moreham	Defensive Line	2	Louisiana State
Russ Pickett	Defensive coordinator	2	Ouachita Baptist

== Roster ==
2013 Central Oklahoma Bronchos football team roster
Players
Coaches
Offense

Pos.	#	Name	Class
WR	2	Christian Hood	Jr
WR	5	Brooks Robertson	Fr
QB	7	Chas Stallard	Fr
RB	9	Donovan Roberts	Fr
QB	10	T.J. Eckert	Fr
WR	11	Marquez Clark	Jr
WR	12	Caden Locke	So
WR	15	Sam Johnson	So
QB	18	Adrian Nelson	Sr
RB	21	Joshua Birmingham	Sr
RB	24	Jake Gandara	Fr
RB	27	Christian Bobo	Sr
TE	35	Clint Simek	Fr
TE	44	Sterling Koons	Sr
OL	53	Ryan Kowalewski	So
OL	54	Hunter Chalfant	Fr
OL	55	Landon Chappell	So
OL	58	Warren Williamson	Fr
OL	62	Brandon Waggoner	Fr
OL	63	Brock Enmeier	So
OL	64	Micah Goodman	Fr
OL	65	Leighton Light	Fr
OL	66	Denton Simek	So
OL	68	Justin Pruitt	Fr
OL	70	Sam Noble	Fr
OL	71	Mason McLaughlin	Fr
OL	75	Alex Levescy	So
OL	76	Jake Reed	Sr
OL	77	Cameron Pound	Sr
OL	78	Mvhayv Locust	Fr
TE	80	Zach Hill	Fr
WR	81	Connor Pulley	Fr
WR	82	Issac Whitney	Fr
WR	83	Bryan Williams	Fr
WR	84	Andrew East	Fr
TE	85	Kyle Aschenbrenner	So
TE	86	C.J. Carson	Sr
TE	89	Kooper Ruminer	Fr

Defense

Pos.	#	Name	Class
DB	6	Devoris Dozier	Sr
LB	8	Ashton Young	Jr
DB	13	Rakim Dawkins	Sr
DB	14	Addison Staggs	Fr
LB	17	Tanner Koons	So
DB	20	Thomas Hill	Jr
DB	22	Braden Calip	Fr
LB	23	Adrian Shoecraft	Sr
DB	25	Rico Hogan	Fr
LB	26	Jason Frimpong	So
DB	28	Levante Douglas	So
DB	29	Cade Shearwood	Fr
DB	30	Clay McKenzie	Fr
LB	31	Antonio Jenkins	Sr
LB	33	Malcolm Howard	Jr
LB	33	Marceice Jackson	Jr
DL	34	Adrian Mack	So
DB	37	Colton Shearwood	Fr
DB	38	Chase Talbert	So
LB	39	La'teze Clayton	Fr
LB	40	Dylan Cox	So
DL	41	Ashton Dandy	Jr
DB	42	Dylan Ward	Fr
LBV	43	Chass Glaspie	Jr
LB	48	Jas'sen Stoner	Fr
LB	50	Garrett Baker	Fr
DL	51	Sam Barlass	Fr
LB	52	Mike Harris	Jr
DL	56	B.J. Scott	Fr
DL	59	Denver Berry	Fr
DL	90	Deonte Wilson	Fr
DL	92	Kenny Allen	So
DL	94	Tyler Newton	Jr
DL	97	Collis Walker	Fr
DL	98	Dillon Rice	Fr
DL	99	Cortreal Scott	Jr

Special teams

Pos.	#	Name	Class
P	16	Ned Balme	Jr
K	37	Seth Hiddink	Fr

Head coach

- Nick Bobeck (2nd season)

Coordinators/assistant coaches

- Russ Pickett – Associate head coach/Defensive coordinator
- Chris Martin – Offensive Coordinator
- Ryan Belsher – Wide Receivers
- Tom Howe – Special Teams Coordinator
- Walter Moreham – Defensive Line
- Jake Smith – Graduate Assistant
- Tyler Holland – Graduate Assistant
- Avery Anderson- Graduate Assistant
- Tony Savino- Graduate Assistant
- Justin Pruett- Student Assistant
- Ryan Carew- Volunteer Assistant

Legend

- (C) Team captain
- (S) Suspended
- (I) Ineligible
- Injured
- Redshirt

Roster
Last update: December 24, 2013

== Game summaries ==
=== Missouri Southern State ===
Central Oklahoma at Missouri Southern State

Team	1	2	3	4	Total
Central Oklahoma	7	7	10	14	38
• Missouri Southern State	21	14	7	10	52

- Date: September 5
- Location: Fred G. Hughes Stadium, Joplin, MO
- Game start: 6:00 p.m. CST
- Elapsed time: 3:04
- Game attendance: 4,357
- Game weather: Clear, 90 °F (32 °C), Wind NNE@ 3 mph (4.8 km/h)
- Referee: John Adams

This was the second ever meeting of the Lions and Bronchos. The Lions began the game with a 14-0 lead with only five minutes left in the first quarter. Lions quarterback Jay McDowell was 10 for 11 for 232 yards and ran for an additional 121 yards and 2 TDs. Broncho running Back Joshua Birmingham ran for 169 yards and 4 TDs. But the Lions large lead to begin the game proved too much for UCO to overcome. The Bronchos fell in their season opener for the sixth year in a row.

=== Pittsburg State ===
Pittsburg State at Central Oklahoma

Team	1	2	3	4	Total
• Pittsburg State	13	21	17	14	65
Central Oklahoma	0	3	7	14	24

- Date: September 14
- Location: Wantland Stadium, Edmond, OK
- Game start: 6:00 p.m. CST
- Elapsed time: 2:54
- Game attendance: 5,100
- Game weather: Partly Cloudy, 81 °F (27 °C), Wind SW@14 mph (23 km/h)
- Referee: Dwight Neibling

=== Emporia State ===
Emporia State at Central Oklahoma

Team	1	2	3	4	Total
• Emporia State	20	7	24	3	54
Central Oklahoma	7	10	14	7	38

- Date: September 21
- Location: Wantland Stadium, Edmond, OK
- Game start: 6:00 p.m. CST
- Elapsed time: 3:07
- Game attendance: 3,500
- Game weather: Clear, 76 °F (24 °C), Wind: SE@7 mph (11 km/h)
- Referee: Craig Helser

=== Washburn ===
Central Oklahoma at Washburn

Team	1	2	3	4	Total
Central Oklahoma	7	0	6	6	19
• Washburn	0	7	14	7	28

- Date: September 28
- Location: Yager Stadium, Topeka, KS
- Game start: 2:37 p.m. CST
- Elapsed time: 3:00
- Game attendance: 4,221
- Game weather: Overcast, 70 °F (21 °C), Winds SW@15-20 mph (32 km/h)
- Referee: J. Rauschelbach
- Television network: MIAA Network

=== Missouri Western State ===
Missouri Western State at Central Oklahoma

Team	1	2	3	4	Total
• Missouri Western State	21	14	7	21	63
Central Oklahoma	14	3	3	10	30

- Date: October 5
- Location: Wantland Stadium, Edmond, OK
- Game start: 6:00 p.m. CST
- Elapsed time: 3:02
- Game attendance: 2,000
- Game weather: Partly Cloudy, 62 °F (17 °C), Winds NW@10 mph (16 km/h)
- Referee: Chris Tallent

=== Northwest Missouri State ===
Central Oklahoma at Northwest Missouri State

Team	1	2	3	4	Total
Central Oklahoma	0	10	0	0	10
• Northwest Missouri State	28	21	16	7	72

- Date: October 12
- Location: Bearcat Stadium, Maryville, MO
- Game start: 1:00 p.m. CST
- Elapsed time: 2:53
- Game attendance: 6,359
- Game weather: Sunny, 67 °F (19 °C), Wind: light
- Referee: Don Hutcheson

=== Central Missouri ===
Central Missouri at Central Oklahoma

Team	1	2	3	4	Total
• Central Missouri	14	13	14	7	48
Central Oklahoma	3	6	7	0	16

- Date: October 19
- Location: Wantland Stadium, Edmond, OK
- Game start: 1:00 p.m. CST
- Elapsed time: 2:43
- Game attendance: 1,200
- Game weather: Sunny, 60 °F (16 °C), Winds WNW@8 mph (13 km/h)
- Referee: John Adams

=== Lincoln ===
Lincoln at Central Oklahoma

Team	1	2	3	4	Total
Lincoln	7	14	14	7	42
• Central Oklahoma	17	13	13	6	49

- Date: November 2
- Location: Wantland Stadium, Edmond, OK
- Game start: 2:00 p.m. CST
- Elapsed time: 3:09
- Game attendance: 4,000
- Game weather: Sunny, 62 °F (17 °C), Winds NNW@13 mph (21 km/h)
- Referee: Danny Harris

=== Southwest Baptist ===
Central Oklahoma at Southwest Baptist

Team	1	2	3	4	Total
• Central Oklahoma	7	14	7	10	38
Southwest Baptist Bearcats	10	0	7	14	31

- Date: November 9
- Location: Plaster Stadium, Bolivar, MO
- Game start: 1:00 p.m. CST
- Elapsed time: 3:05
- Game attendance: 1,830

=== Northeastern State ===
Central Oklahoma at Northeastern State

Team	1	2	3	4	Total
Central Oklahoma	7	3	7	21	38
• Northeastern State	7	17	8	13	45

- Date: November 16
- Location: Doc Wadley Stadium, Tahlequah, OK
- Game start: 1:00 p.m. CST
- Elapsed time: 2:53
- Game attendance: 1,564
- Game weather: Clear, 63 °F (17 °C), Winds SSE@14 mph (23 km/h)
- Referee: John Adams

== Rankings ==
Ranking movements Legend: — = Not ranked
	Week												
Poll	Pre	1	2	3	4	5	6	7	8	9	10	11	Final
AFCA	—	—	—	—	—	—	—	—	—	—	—	—	—

== Statistics ==
=== Team ===
	UCO	Opp
Points per game	30.0	50.0
First downs	224	255
Rushing	83	117
Passing	125	118
Penalty	16	20
Rushing yardage	1775	2402
Rushing attempts	383	485
Avg per rush	4.6	5.4
Avg per game	177.5	240.2
Passing Yardage	2824	2923
Avg per game	282.4	292.3
Completions-Attempts	203-352 (57.7%)	207-292 (70.9%)
Total offense	4,599	5,325
Total plays	735	737
Avg per play	6.3	7.2
Avg per game	455.9	532.5
Fumbles-Lost	18-7	11-5

	UCO	Opp
Punts-Yards	56-1,887 (33.7 avg)	48-1,905 (39.7 avg)
Punt returns-Total yards	18-326 (18.1 avg)	13-185 (14.2 avg)
Kick returns-Total yards	58-997 (17.2 avg)	52-1139 (21.9 avg)
Avg time of possession per game	28:57	31:03
Penalties-Yards	61-558	57-496
Avg per game	55.8	49.6
3rd down conversions	46/138 (33%)	55/132 (42%)
4th down conversions	6/15 (40%)	11/17 (65%)
Sacks by-Yards	23-152	17-83
Total TDs	38	69
Rushing	25	35
Passing	10	32
Field goals-Attempts	13-15 86%)	6-8 (75%)
PAT-Attempts	33-37 (89%)	64-68 (94%)
Total attendance	31,600	36,662
Games-Avg per game	10-3,160	10-3,366

=== Scores by quarter ===
	1	2	3	4	Total
Opponents	141	128	128	103	500
Central Oklahoma	69	69	74	88	300
