= Eugene Maynor =

American sports coach

Biographical details
- Born: August 27, 1893; Blount County, Alabama, U.S.
- Died: July 25, 1983 (aged 89); Blount County, Alabama, U.S.

Coaching career (HC unless noted)

Football
- 1922: Northwest Missouri State
- 1925–1926: Western State (CO)

Basketball
- 1922–1923: Northwest Missouri State

Baseball
- 1924: Northwestern (freshmen)

Wrestling
- 1923–1925: Northwestern

Head coaching record
- Overall: 7–16–1 (football); 7–7 (basketball)

Eugene Asbury "Cap" Maynor (August 27, 1893 – July 25, 1983) was an American football, basketball, baseball, and wrestling coach. He served as the head football coach at Northwest Missouri State Teacher's College—now known as Northwest Missouri State University—in Maryville, Missouri in 1922 and Western State College of Colorado—now known as Western Colorado University—in Gunnison, Colorado from 1925 to 1926.

== Head coaching record ==
=== Football ===
Year	Team	Overall	Conference	Standing	Bowl/playoffs
Northwest Missouri State Bearcats (Missouri Intercollegiate Athletic Association) (1922)
1922	Northwest Missouri State	4–4–1	3–3–1	T–5th	
Northwest Missouri State:		4–4–1	3–3–1		
Western State Mountaineers (Rocky Mountain Conference) (1925–1926)
1925	Western State	3–4	2–4	8th	
1926	Western State	0–8	0–7	12th	
Western State:		3–12	2–11		
Total:		7–16–1			
