= 2013 NCAA Division II Football Championship Game =

Postseason college football game

2013 NCAA Division II Football Championship
| Lenoir–Rhyne Bears | Northwest Missouri State Bearcats |
| (13–1) | (14–0) |
| SAC | MIAA |
| 28 | 43 |
| Head coach: Mike Houston | Head coach: Adam Dorrel |
| Seed 1 | Seed 1 |
| | 1 | 2 | 3 | 4 | Total |
|---|---|---|---|---|---|
| Lenoir–Rhyne | 7 | 0 | 7 | 14 | 28 |
| Northwest Missouri State | 17 | 5 | 7 | 14 | 43 |
- Date: December 21, 2013
- Season: 2013
- Stadium: Braly Municipal Stadium
- Location: Florence, Alabama
- Referee: David Siegle
- Attendance: 6,543

United States TV coverage
- Network: ESPN2
- Announcers: Tom Hart (play-by-play), John Congemi (analyst), Quint Kessenich (sideline)

The 2013 NCAA Division II Football Championship Game was a postseason college football game that determined a national champion in NCAA Division II for the 2013 season. It was played at Braly Municipal Stadium in Florence, Alabama, on December 21, 2013, with kickoff at noon EST (11:00 a.m. local CST), and television coverage on ESPN2.

== Teams ==
The participants of the 2013 NCAA Division II Football Championship Game were the finalists of the 2013 Division II Playoffs, which began with teams seeded 3–6 in each super region playing in the first round, the winners of which faced teams seeded 1–2 in the second round. From there, the bracket was a sixteen-team single-elimination tournament. The game featured the No. 1 seed Lenoir–Rhyne Bears and the No. 1 seed Northwest Missouri State Bearcats. This was the eighth championship game appearance for the Bearcats and the first championship game appearance for the Bears.

=== National semifinals ===
Semifinals; December 14; Hosted by team with asterisk
3 | West Chester | 14
1 | Lenoir–Rhyne* | 42
1 | Northwest Missouri State* | 27
4 | Grand Valley State | 10

National Championship; December 21; Braly Municipal Stadium, Florence, AL
1 | Lenoir–Rhyne | 28
1 | Northwest Missouri State | 43

== Game summary ==
2013 NCAA Division II Football Championship Game

| Quarter | 1 | 2 | 3 | 4 | Total |
|---|---|---|---|---|---|
| No. 1 Lenoir–Rhyne | 7 | 0 | 7 | 14 | 28 |
| No. 1 Northwest Missouri State | 17 | 5 | 7 | 14 | 43 |

at Braly Municipal Stadium • Florence, Alabama

- Date: Saturday, December 21, 2013
- Game time: Noon EST (11:00 a.m. CST)
- Game weather: Overcast • Temperature: 67 °F (19 °C)
- Game attendance: 6,543
- Referee: David Siegle
- TV announcers (ESPN2): Tom Hart (play-by-play), John Congemi (analyst), Quint Kessenich (sideline)

Game information

First quarter

- (11:38) NWMS - Reuben Thomas 29 yard pass from Trevor Adams, Simon Mathieson kick (Drive: 6 plays, 59 yards, 1:53; Northwest Missouri State 3–0)
- (6:27) NWMS - Simon Mathieson 28 yard field goal (Drive: 8 plays, 48 yards, 3:24; Northwest Missouri State 10–0)
- (5:03) NWMS - Billy Creason 4 yard rush, Simon Mathieson kick (Drive: 3 plays, 15 yards, 1:11; Northwest Missouri State 17–0)
- (1:16) LR - Chris Robinson 3 yard rush, Zach Neumann kick (Drive: 9 plays, 75 yards, 3:47; Northwest Missouri State 17–7)

Second quarter

- (5:56) NWMS – Punt blocked through the back of the end zone, safety (Northwest Missouri State 19–7)
- (0:00) NWMS - Simon Mathieson 20 yard field goal (Drive: 13 plays, 72 yards, 5:56; Northwest Missouri State 22–7)

Third quarter

- (7:39) NWMS - Reuben Thomas 30 yard pass from Trevor Adams, Simon Mathieson kick (Drive: 3 plays, 55 yards, 0:44; Northwest Missouri State 29–7)
- (6:01) LR - Greyson Wells 59 yard pass from Josh Justice, Zach Neumann kick (Drive: 4 plays, 74 yards, 1:38; Northwest Missouri State 29–14)

Fourth quarter

- (11:36) NWMS - Brady Bolles 4 yard rush, Simon Mathieson kick (Drive: 3 plays, 49 yards, 0:59; Northwest Missouri State 36–14)
- (8:35) LR - Greyson Wells 34 yard pass from Corron Boston, Zach Neumann kick (Drive: 7 plays, 80 yards, 3:01; Northwest Missouri State 36–21)
- (2:56) NWMS - Jason Jozaites 17 yard pass from Trevor Adams, Simon Mathieson kick (Drive: 9 plays, 63 yards, 5:39; Northwest Missouri State 43–21)
- (1:04) LR - Josh Justice 1 yard rush, Zach Neumann kick (Drive: 7 plays, 75 yards, 1:52; Northwest Missouri State 43–28)

=== Statistics ===
| Statistics | LR | NWMS |
|---|---|---|
| First downs | 24 | 19 |
| Plays–yards | 65–376 | 62–416 |
| Rushes–yards | 59–273 | 37–139 |
| Passing yards | 103 | 277 |
| Passing: Comp–Att–Int | 4–6–0 | 15–25–0 |
| Time of possession | 31:17 | 28:43 |

| Team | Category | Player | Statistics |
|---|---|---|---|
| Lenoir–Rhyne | Passing | Josh Justice | 3/3, 69 yards, 1 TD |
| Lenoir–Rhyne | Rushing | Jarrod Spears | 13 carries, 108 yards |
| Lenoir–Rhyne | Receiving | Greyson Wells | 2 receptions, 93 yards, 2 TD |
| Northwest Missouri State | Passing | Trevor Adams | 15/25, 277 yards, 3 TD |
| Northwest Missouri State | Rushing | Billy Creason | 13 carries, 76 yards, 1 TD |
| Northwest Missouri State | Receiving | Reuben Thomas | 5 receptions, 92 yards, 2 TD |
