= Matt Keeley =

American basketball coach

Current position
- Title: Head coach
- Team: Northwest Missouri State
- Conference: MIAA
- Record: 21–38 (.356)

Playing career
- 2000–2004: MidAmerica Nazarene

Coaching career (HC unless noted)
- 2004–2005: MidAmerica Nazarene (GA)
- 2007–2009: Washburn (assistant)
- 2009–2017: MidAmerica Nazarene (assistant)
- 2017–2024: Ottawa (AZ)
- 2024–present: Northwest Missouri State

Head coaching record
- Overall: 135–127 (.515)
- Tournaments: 2–1 (NCCAA); 6–2 (NAIA)

Accomplishments and honors

Championships
- 2 GSAC tournament (2022, 2023)

Awards
- As a player: 2× NAIA Division II All-American (2003, 2004); HAAC Player of the Year (2004); As a coach: NCCAA National Coach of the Year (2023)

Matt Keeley is the men's basketball head coach at Northwest Missouri State University in Maryville, Missouri.

== Life ==
Keeley was raised in Great Bend, Kansas. He played college basketball at MidAmerica Nazarene University under head coach Rocky Lamar, where the school made 4 NAIA Division II tournament appearances during his playing career, including 2 quarterfinal runs and a national championship appearance in 2001. Keeley was a 2-time All-American at MNU and led the NAIA in assists in 2004 on his way to winning HAAC player of the year honors.

After a decade of assistant coaching stops at Washburn and MNU, Keeley became the head coach at Ottawa University Arizona in 2017, where he took them to 3 straight tournament appearances, including a NCCAA national championship appearance in 2021 and NAIA Fab Four appearance in 2023. During this time, he was named the NCCAA National Coach of the Year in 2023.

== Head coach record ==
Record table
| Season | Team | Overall | Conference | Standing | Postseason |
|---|---|---|---|---|---|
Ottawa (AZ) (Independent) (2017–2018)
| 2017–18 | Ottawa (AZ) | 15–13 | | | |
Ottawa (AZ) (Golden State Athletic Conference) (2018–2024)
| 2018–19 | Ottawa (AZ) | 5–23 | 2–16 | | |
| 2019–20 | Ottawa (AZ) | 11–17 | 6–12 | T–7th | |
| 2020–21 | Ottawa (AZ) | 13–6 | 6–4 | 5th | NCCAA Runner-Up |
| 2021–22 | Ottawa (AZ) | 25–9 | 11–7 | T–3rd | NAIA Second Round |
| 2022–23 | Ottawa (AZ) | 25–10 | 11–8 | 4th | NAIA Fab Four |
| 2023–24 | Ottawa (AZ) | 19–11 | 8–6 | T–4th | |
| Ottawa (AZ): | | 113–89 (.559) | 44–53 (.454) | | |
Northwest Missouri State (Mid-America Intercollegiate Athletic Association) (2024–present)
| 2024–25 | Northwest Missouri State | 6–22 | 4–15 | 14th | |
| 2025–26 | Northwest Missouri State | 15–16 | 8–11 | | |
| Northwest Missouri State: | | 21–38 (.356) | 12–26 (.316) | | |
| Total: | | 135–127 (.515) | | | |
National champion Postseason invitational champion Conference regular season champion Conference regular season and conference tournament champion Division regular season champion Division regular season and conference tournament champion Conference tournament champion
