= Hanley Painter =

American football coach, college athletics administrator (1924–2001)

Biographical details
- Born: August 28, 1924; Goodwater, Alabama, U.S.
- Died: November 16, 2001 (aged 77); Hickory, North Carolina, U.S.

Playing career

Football
- 1946–1949: Lenoir–Rhyne
- Positions: Tackle, fullback

Coaching career (HC unless noted)

Football
- 1950–1953: Taylorsville HS (NC)
- 1954: Lenoir–Rhyne (ends)
- 1955–1961: Lenoir–Rhyne (line / first assistant)
- 1962–1972: Lenoir–Rhyne

Baseball
- 1957–1961: Lenoir–Rhyne

Administrative career (AD unless noted)
- 1961–1982: Lenoir–Rhyne

Head coaching record
- Overall: 66–43–2 (college football); 50–39–2 (college baseball); 23–16 (high school football)
- Tournaments: Football; 1–1 (NAIA playoffs)

Accomplishments and honors

Championships
- Football; 5 Carolinas Conference (1962, 1965–1968)

Hanley Hayes Painter (August 28, 1924 – November 16, 2001) was an American football and baseball coach, college athletics administrator, and educator. He served as the head football coach at Lenoir–Rhyne College—now known as Lenoir–Rhyne University—in Hickory, North Carolina from 1962 to 1973, compiling a career college football of 66–43–2. He led the Lenoir–Rhyne Bears to five Carolinas Conference titles and an appearance in the NAIA Football National Championship title game in 1962. Painter was also the head baseball coach at Lenoir–Rhyne from 1957 to 1961, the school's athletic director from 1961 to 1982, and a professor of health and education.

== Early life, military service, and playing career ==
Painter was born on August 28, 1924, in Goodwater, Alabama. He moved with his family as a youth to Bryson City, North Carolina, where he attended high school. During World War II, Painter served with the United States Marine Corps in the Pacific theater, where he was wounded at the Battle of Saipan and the Battle of Iwo Jima.

After the war, Painter played college football at Lenoir–Rhyne as a tackle and fullback from 1946 to 1949 under Clarence Stasavich.

== Coaching career ==
After graduating from Lenoir–Rhyne in 1950, Painter spent four years as the football coach at Taylorsville High School in Taylorsville, North Carolina, tallying a mark of 23–16. He returned to Lenoir–Rhyne in 1954 as ends coach under Stasavich and was promoted to line coach and first assistant the next year. He succeeded Stasavich as head football coach following the 1961 season.

== Late life and death ==
Painter resigned as Lenoir–Rhyne's athletic director in 1982. He died on November 16, 2001.

== Head coaching record ==
=== College football ===
Year	Team	Overall	Conference	Standing	Bowl/playoffs	NAIA^{#}
Lenoir–Rhyne Bears (Carolinas Conference) (1962–1972)
1962	Lenoir–Rhyne	11–1	6–0	1st	L NAIA Championship	3
1963	Lenoir–Rhyne	4–6	2–4	5th		
1964	Lenoir–Rhyne	3–6–1	2–3–1	5th		
1965	Lenoir–Rhyne	7–3	6–0	1st		
1966	Lenoir–Rhyne	6–3	5–2	T–1st		
1967	Lenoir–Rhyne	8–1	6–1	1st		9
1968	Lenoir–Rhyne	7–2	5–1	T–1st		
1969	Lenoir–Rhyne	6–4	4–1	2nd		
1970	Lenoir–Rhyne	7–4	4–1	2nd		
1971	Lenoir–Rhyne	2–7–1	1–3–1	5th		
1972	Lenoir–Rhyne	5–6	1–4	5th		
Lenoir–Rhyne:		66–43–2	42–20–2			
Total:		66–43–2				
National championship Conference title Conference division title or championship game berth
^{#}Rankings from NAIA poll.
