= Northwest Missouri State Bearcats football =

American college football program

- First season: 1908; 118 years ago
- Athletic director: Andy Peterson
- Head coach: John McMenamin; 1st season, 9–3 (.750)
- Location: Maryville, Missouri
- Stadium: Bearcat Stadium (capacity: 6,500)
- Field: Mel Tjeerdsma Field
- NCAA division: Division II
- Conference: The MIAA
- Colors: Bearcat green and white
- All-time record: 590–399–33 (.593)

NCAA Division II championships
- 1998, 1999, 2009, 2013, 2015, 2016

Conference championships
- 31
- Consensus All-Americans: 69
- Rivalries: Pittsburg State; Missouri Western; Truman; Central Missouri
- Mascot: Bobby Bearcat
- Marching band: Bearcat Marching Band
- Outfitter: Adidas
- Website: bearcatsports.com//football

The Northwest Missouri State Bearcats football program represents Northwest Missouri State University in college football. They participate in Division II sports within the NCAA. The team plays their home games at Bearcat Stadium, located on campus in Maryville, Missouri.

They have appeared in ten NCAA Division II national title games – winning six – since going 0–11 in Mel Tjeerdsma's first season in 1994. The Bearcats have made the playoffs in 20 seasons and have also won or shared 31 MIAA titles.

Northwest Missouri State plays its games at Bearcat Stadium, built in 1917, and the oldest NCAA Division II stadium still in use. The field was expanded to 6,500 seats and a video screen was added in 2003 after Tjeerdsma began his run. This screen was replaced in 2014 by a 20-foot by 40-foot high-resolution screen with the scoreboard attached underneath.

Previously, Northwest Missouri played its games with Pittsburg State University at Arrowhead Stadium in Kansas City, Missouri in the Fall Classic at Arrowhead. The series was discontinued in 2013, games are now played on campus sites. Pittsburg has made four national title appearances since 1991. The October 17, 2002 game was witnessed by 26,695—the largest number in MIAA history.

== Conference ==
Northwest was one of the original 1912 organizers of the Mid-America Intercollegiate Athletics Association. The school has not played in any other conference. The conference headquarters until 1997 was in the Maryville, Missouri home of its first commissioner Ken B. Jones. In 1997 it moved to Overland Park, Kansas and has subsequently moved to Kansas City.

== Championships ==
=== National championship seasons ===
Season	Coach	Selectors	Record	Bowl
1998	Mel Tjeerdsma	NCAA Division II; Playoff	15–0	Won 1998 championship
1999	Mel Tjeerdsma	NCAA Division II; Playoff	14–1	Won 1999 championship
2009	Mel Tjeerdsma	NCAA Division II; Playoff	14–1	Won 2009 championship
2013	Adam Dorrel	NCAA Division II; Playoff	15–0	Won 2013 championship
2015	Adam Dorrel	NCAA Division II; Playoff	15–0	Won 2015 championship
2016	Adam Dorrel	NCAA Division II; Playoff	15–0	Won 2016 championship
National Championships			6	

=== Conference championship seasons ===
- Conference Championships (31)

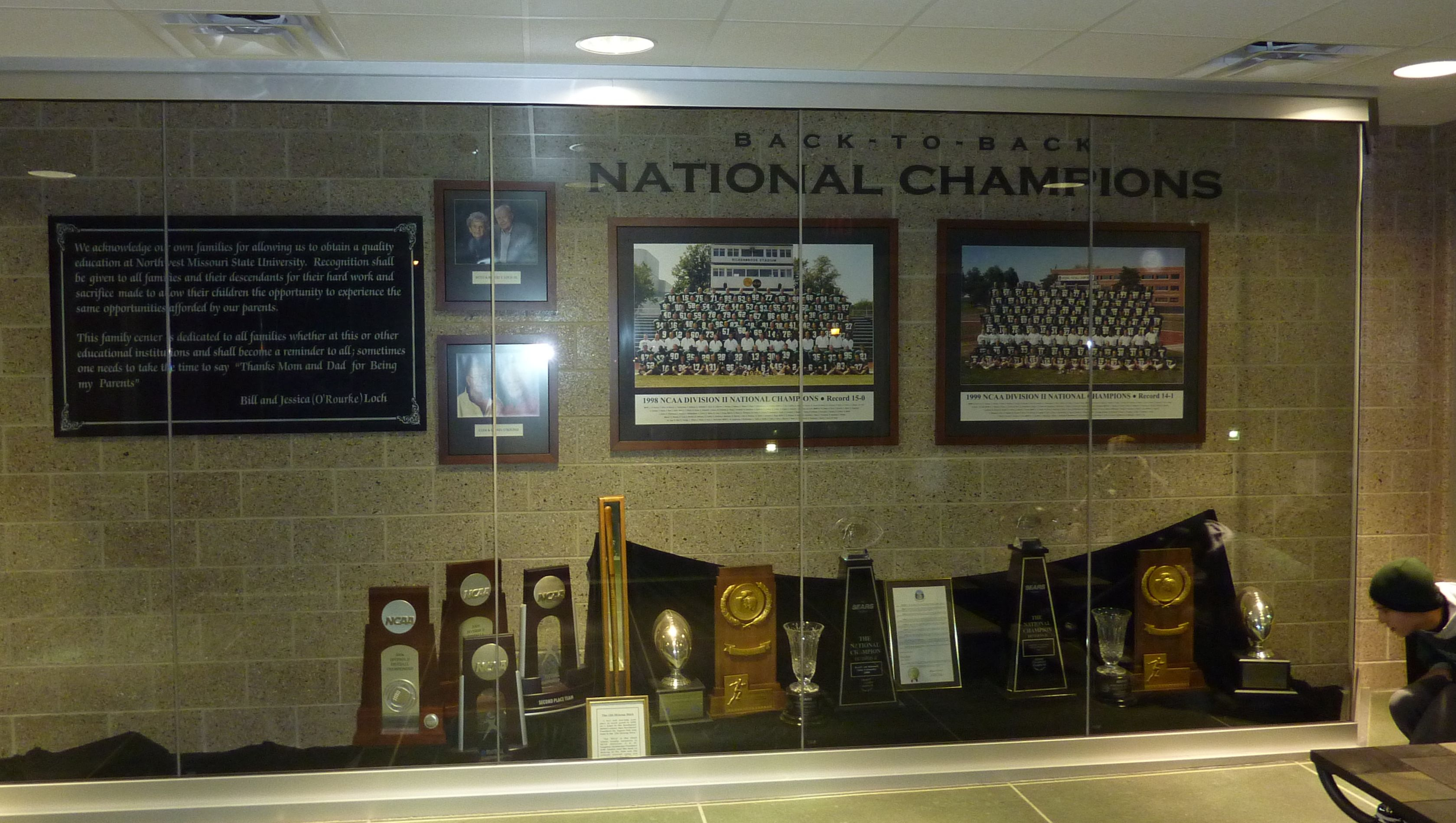
National football championship trophy room at Bearcat Stadium prior to its national title in 2009. The two trophies in the middle are national championships in 1998 and 1999. The four trophies on the left are for appearances in the title games in 2005, 2006, 2007, and 2008. Northwest in 2009 made unprecedented fifth consecutive national title game in 2009 and won its third title. The stick in the middle left is the Hickory Stick in the contests with Truman State

Year	Conference	Coach	Overall record	Conf. record
1925	Missouri Intercollegiate Athletic Association	H. Frank Lawrence	7–0–1	3–0–1
1931	Missouri Intercollegiate Athletic Association	E.A. Davis	9–0	4–0
1938	Missouri Intercollegiate Athletic Association	Ryland Milner	9–0	5–0
1939	Missouri Intercollegiate Athletic Association	Ryland Milner	9–0	5–0
1941^{1}	Missouri Intercollegiate Athletic Association	Ryland Milner	6–2–1	3–1–1
1942^{1}	Missouri Intercollegiate Athletic Association	Ryland Milner	4–2–1	3–1
1948^{1}	Missouri Intercollegiate Athletic Association	Ryland Milner	4–1	6–2
1952^{1}	Missouri Intercollegiate Athletic Association	Ryland Milner	6–3	4–1
1972^{1}	Missouri Intercollegiate Athletic Association	Gladden Dye	7–3	5–1
1974	Missouri Intercollegiate Athletic Association	Gladden Dye	8–2	5–1
1979	Missouri Intercollegiate Athletic Association	James Redd	6–5	5–1
1984	Missouri Intercollegiate Athletic Association	Vern Thomsen	10–1	5–0
1996^{1}	Mid-America Intercollegiate Athletics Association	Mel Tjeerdsma	11–2	8–1
1997	Mid-America Intercollegiate Athletics Association	Mel Tjeerdsma	12–1	9–0
1998	Mid-America Intercollegiate Athletics Association	Mel Tjeerdsma	15–0	9–0
1999	Mid-America Intercollegiate Athletics Association	Mel Tjeerdsma	14–1	9–0
2000	Mid-America Intercollegiate Athletics Association	Mel Tjeerdsma	11–1	9–0
2002	Mid-America Intercollegiate Athletics Association	Mel Tjeerdsma	12–1	9–0
2003^{1}	Mid-America Intercollegiate Athletics Association	Mel Tjeerdsma	8–3	7–2
2006	Mid-America Intercollegiate Athletics Association	Mel Tjeerdsma	14–1	9–0
2007	Mid-America Intercollegiate Athletics Association	Mel Tjeerdsma	12–2	9–0
2008	Mid-America Intercollegiate Athletics Association	Mel Tjeerdsma	13–2	10–0
2009	Mid-America Intercollegiate Athletics Association	Mel Tjeerdsma	14–1	9–0
2010	Mid-America Intercollegiate Athletics Association	Mel Tjeerdsma	12–2	9–0
2013	Mid-America Intercollegiate Athletics Association	Adam Dorrel	15–0	10–0
2014^{1}	Mid-America Intercollegiate Athletics Association	Adam Dorrel	11–2	10–1
2015	Mid-America Intercollegiate Athletics Association	Adam Dorrel	15–0	11–0
2016	Mid-America Intercollegiate Athletics Association	Adam Dorrel	15–0	11–0
2018^{1}	Mid-America Intercollegiate Athletics Association	Rich Wright	10–3	9–2
2019^{1}	Mid-America Intercollegiate Athletics Association	Rich Wright	12–2	10–1
2021	Mid-America Intercollegiate Athletics Association	Rich Wright	11–2	9–1
2025^{1}	Mid-America Intercollegiate Athletics Association	John McMenamin	9–3	8–1
Total Conference Championships:			31	
^{1} Denotes co-champions

== NCAA Division II championship games ==
=== 1998 ===
In 1998, the Bearcats won the NCAA Division II football national championship by going 15–0. It was the first time in history a Division II school won 15 games and the first time a Northwest athletic program won a team national championship in any sport.

=== 1999 ===
In 1999, the Bearcats defeated the Carson–Newman Eagles 58–52 in four overtimes to defend the title. The game was the longest in NCAA football playoff history in number of extra periods, surpassing six contests that were extended by three overtimes. The broadcast analyst on ESPN called it the best college football game he'd ever seen. The game solidified ESPN's interest in Division II football, prompting ESPN to cover the semi-final games.

=== 2005 ===
In 2005 the Bearcats were a cinderella team, ranked 22nd at the start of the playoffs, but they won all of their playoff games on the road until reaching the finals against the Grand Valley State Lakers. Northwest led the game until the closing minutes and still almost pulled the game out. The Cinderella nature of Northwest coming from #22 to challenge the #1 team in the final has been evoked as a weakness of the Bowl Championship Series, where such a run would be impossible.

=== 2006 ===
In the 2006 regular season the Bearcats went undefeated at 11–0. In their third playoff game, a game played against the Bloomsburg Huskies, ESPNU televised the game live from Maryville. This was the first nationally televised game from Bearcat Stadium. The game was also the first time that temporary lights (provided by ESPN) were used at Bearcat Stadium, its lights having been removed in 1977. The Bearcats went 3–0 in the playoffs, thus earning a rematch against the Grand Valley State Lakers in the NCAA Division II National Championship Game at Florence, Alabama, on December 16, 2006. The Bearcats fell to the Lakers 17–14 after turning the ball over four times during the game.

=== 2007 ===
In the 2007 regular season the Bearcats went 9–1. Their only loss was to the #1 Nebraska–Omaha Mavericks, who went 12–0 in the regular season. The Bearcats received a first round bye. In the second round, they would face the #3 West Texas A&M Buffaloes, at Bearcat Stadium, and won with a final score of 56–28. In the quarterfinals the Bearcats traveled to Chadron, Nebraska to face #1 Chadron State Eagles. Xavier Omon lead the Bearcats to a 26–13 victory by rushing for a personal best 309 yards (283 m). The Bearcats faced their long-time post-season rivals the Grand Valley State Lakers in the semifinals. Both Grand Valley and Northwest were #2 seeds in their respective regions, but the NCAA stated that due to Northwest's strength of schedule, Northwest would receive the home game. The game was broadcast from Bearcat Stadium on ESPN2; this was the second nationally televised game from Bearcat Stadium. The game was close through the third quarter. At the beginning of the fourth quarter Northwest lead the close contest, 17–16. But after a Northwest interception that produced a touchdown, and a 98-yard (90 m) Xavier Omon touchdown run, the Bearcats prevailed with a final score of 34–16, ending Grand Valley's NCAA record-setting 40-game winning streak. The Bearcats lost to the #8 Valdosta State Blazers in the NCAA Division II football national championship in Florence, Alabama; the game was broadcast on ESPN2.

=== 2008 ===
In 2008 the Bearcats played in their fourth consecutive national title game and lost to Minnesota–Duluth, who had a 15–0 season. Northwest has never lost a championship by more than seven points.

=== 2009 ===
In 2009, the Bearcats made its fifth consecutive national title appearance. No NCAA team in any division has ever done that. The Bearcats, which were ranked #2 going into the playoffs, received a first round bye. In the second round, they avenged their only loss of the season by defeating the Abilene Christian Wildcats. In the closest game of the playoffs they defeated the Central Washington Wildcats (ranked #1 at the time) in the quarterfinals by rallying in the second half and then blocking an extra point in the closing seconds. In the semifinals, they would defeat the California Vulcans of Pennsylvania to qualify for its third meeting in the finals with the Grand Valley State Lakers.

=== 2013 ===
Northwest won its fourth title in 2013 defeating the Lenoir–Rhyne Bears 43–28. It was the first Bearcat national championship game not coached by Mel Tjeerdsma, who retired after losing in the semi-finals in 2010. He was initially succeeded by Scott Bostwick who had been with Tjeerdsma during his entire tenure at Northwest including Tjeerdsma's initial 0–11 team in 1994. Bostwick passed away 6 months later, before coaching a game as a head coach. Adam Dorrel, the offensive coordinator, became the head coach. Tjeerdsma came out of retirement in 2013 to become Northwest's athletic director. The Bearcats were undefeated 11–0 in the regular season and won the 4 playoff games. The game was the last title game at Braly Stadium in Alabama. The MIAA, sparked by the success of Northwest and Pittsburg, successfully bid to host the championship games starting in 2014 at Children's Mercy Park in Kansas City, Kansas about 100 miles south of the Northwest campus.

=== 2015 ===
Northwest took on the Shepherd Rams at Children's Mercy Park in Kansas City, Kansas on December 19. The game was the Bearcats' ninth appearance in the national title game and first at its new site in Kansas City. Northwest took home their fifth national title since 1998, second under head coach Adam Dorrel, defeating the Shepherd Rams 34–7.

=== 2016 ===
Northwest played the North Alabama Lions for the 2016 NCAA Division II Championship in a snowstorm. This was the Bearcats' tenth appearance in the national title game and its second trip to the title game in Kansas City. Northwest Missouri State picked up its sixth title when the Bearcats defeated the Lions, 29–3.

== Post season results ==
At the conclusion of the 2025 season, Northwest is 53–21 in post-season play. They competed in the playoffs every year from 2004 to 2022 (excluding the 2020 shortened COVID-19 season) and were 44–14 during that run and had played in the national title game eight times (winning four).

Year	NW Rank	Venue	Opp Rank	Opponent	Score	W/L	Round	Notes
1984	–	Away	–	Nebraska–Omaha	15–28	L	First round	
1989	18	Away	–	Pittsburg State	7–28	L	First round	
1996	2	Away	–	Nebraska–Omaha	22–21	W	First round	
1996	2	Away	–	Northern Colorado	26–27	L	Quarterfinal	
1997	3	Maryville	16	North Dakota State	39–28	W	First round	
1997	3	Maryville	–	Northern Colorado	19–35	L	Quarterfinal	
1998	2	Maryville	16	Nebraska–Omaha	28–14	W	First round	
1998	2	Maryville	6	Northern Colorado	42–17	W	Quarterfinal	
1998	2	Maryville	11	Texas A&M–Kingsville	49–34	W	Semifinal	
1998	2	Braly Stadium	3	Carson–Newman	24–6	W	Final	
1999	4	Maryville	9	North Dakota State	20–13	W	First round	
1999	4	Maryville	3	Northern Colorado	43–35	W	Quarterfinal	
1999	4	Maryville	–	Indiana (PA)	20–12	W	Semifinal	
1999	4	Braly Stadium	1	Carson–Newman	58–52^{4OT}	W	Final	
2000	1	Maryville	5	North Dakota State	13–17	L	First round	
2002	4	Maryville	11	Minnesota–Duluth	45–41	W	Second round (First round bye)	
2002	4	Maryville	7	Northern Colorado	12–23	L	Quarterfinal	
2004	4	Maryville	6	Texas A&M–Kingsville	34–14	W	First round	
2004	4	Away	1	Pittsburg State	36–50	L	Quarterfinal	
2005	21	Away	29	Angelo State	45–14	W	First round	
2005	21	Away	12	Washburn	42–32	W	Second round	
2005	21	Away	23	Pittsburg State	21–10	W	Quarterfinal	
2005	21	Away	13	North Alabama	25–24	W	Semifinal	
2005	21	Braly Stadium	1	Grand Valley State	17–21	L	Final	
2006	2	Maryville	18	Midwestern State	27–0	W	Second round (First round bye)	
2006	2	Maryville	8	Chadron State	28–21	W	Quarterfinal	
2006	2	Maryville	6	Bloomsburg	33–3	W	Semifinal	
2006	2	Braly Stadium	1	Grand Valley State	14–17	L	Final	
2007	5	Maryville	4	West Texas A&M	56–28	W	Second round (First round bye)	
2007	5	Away	2	Chadron State	26–13	W	Quarterfinal	
2007	5	Maryville	1	Grand Valley State	34–16	W	Semifinal	
2007	5	Braly Stadium	8	Valdsota State	20–25	L	Final	
2008	3	Maryville	10	Pittsburg State	38–35	W	Second round (First round bye)	
2008	3	Away	2	Abilene Christian	45–36	W	Quarterfinal	
2008	3	Away	5	North Alabama	41–7	W	Semifinal	
2008	3	Braly Stadium	6	Minnesota–Duluth	14–21	L	Final	
2009	2	Maryville	16	Abilene Christian	35–10	W	Second round (First round bye)	
2009	2	Away	1	Central Washington	21–20	W	Quarterfinal	
2009	2	Maryville	20	California (PA)	56–31	W	Semifinal	
2009	2	Braly Stadium	3	Grand Valley State	30–23	W	Final	
2010	3	Maryville	-	Missouri Western	28–24	W	First round	Northwest trailed by 17 at half—it was largest deficit that it had come back from.
2010	3	Away	4	Texas A&M–Kingsville	35–31	W	Second round	Texas had defeated Northwest on opening day. Northwest won with 17 seconds remaining on Blake Bolles to Josh Baker pass.
2010	3	Maryville	7	Central Missouri	37–20	W	Quarterfinal	Northwest had won earlier game in Warrensburg on a field goal as time expired that was attended by 13,096—the biggest crowd at MIAA venue in history.
2010	3	Away	1	Minnesota–Duluth	13–17	L	Semifinal	Played during snowstorm that collapsed the Hubert H. Humphrey Metrodome roof. Temperatures were in the single digits along with 30 mph winds. Northwest led most of the game until 4:12 left in the fourth quarter.
2011	7	Away	17	Missouri Western	35–29	W	1st round	Northwest lost earlier game in St. Joseph 31–28. Northwest rallied in second half with 21 unanswered points. Northwest had been down 16–0 in the first four minutes of the game.
2011	7	Away	1	Midwestern State	38–31^{OT}	W	Second round	Midwestern State was ranked #1 going into the game and was one of the only 3 undefeated teams. Midwestern State led 28–10 in the second quarter – the biggest deficit Northwest has had since it began its dominance in 2004. The game was played in 30 mph winds. Midwestern State marched to the Bearcat 9 with 10 seconds remaining. Greg Saladino shanked a potential game-winning field goal throwing it into overtime. Bearcat quarterback Trevor Adams hit Kyle Kilgore on a 13-yard wheel route for the overtime's only score from either team.
2011	7	Away	6	Pittsburg State	16–41	L	Quarterfinal	Pittsburg had defeated the Bearcats earlier in the season in a game that broke Northwest's record 49 straight MIAA victory record (a game in which the Bearcats had led 21–0) and this was a rematch of MIAA teams. The game was played in a driving rain. Northwest led 10–0 at the end of the first quarter and it was tied at half. Pittsburg scored 31 points in second half.
2012	10	Maryville	9	Harding	35–0	W	First round	
2012	10	Away	2	Minnesota State–Mankato	35–38^{2OT}	L	Second round	Northwest was down 0–21 but scored 28 points in the second half to force two overtimes in which Northwest ultimately lost after Mankato turned an intercepted pass into a field goal.
2013	2	Maryville	5	Minnesota–Duluth	45–21	W	Second round (First round bye)	
2013	2	Maryville	12	St. Cloud State	59–21	W	Quarterfinal	
2013	2	Maryville	22	Grand Valley State	27–13	W	Semifinal	Game was attended by Missouri Governor Jay Nixon who gave a pep talk to team at the beginning.
2013	2	Braly Stadium	13	Lenoir–Rhyne	43–28	W	Final	Lenoir–Rhyne set a record for most offensive rushing yards in any NCAA division in one season however it was held in check by Northwest which jumped to a 17–0 lead in the first quarter. The game was the last Division II championship at Braly Stadium. Northwest's home conference MIAA won a bid the week before the game to host future championships 100 miles from Maryville in Kansas City at Sporting Park.
2014	6	Away	2	Minnesota–Duluth	21–25	L	First round	Northwest led 21–6 going into the 4th quarter.
2015	1	Maryville	11	Humboldt State	54–7	W	Second round (First round bye)	
2015	1	Maryville	18	Emporia State	38–17	W	Quarterfinal	
2015	1	Maryville	7	West Georgia	38–23	W	Semifinal	
2015	1	Kansas City, Kansas	7	Shepherd	34–7	W	Final	
2016	1	Maryville	9	Emporia State	44–13	W	Second round (First round bye)	
2016	1	Maryville	5	Harding	35–0	W	Quarterfinal	NW held Harding to just 119 total yard all coming on the ground.
2016	1	Maryville	5	Ferris State	35–20	W	Semifinal	Ferris State took a 13–7 lead in the 2nd quarter
2016	1	Kansas City, Kansas	7	North Alabama	29–3	W	Final	Over four inches of snow fell during the game and temperatures were at -5 with wind chill
2017	13	Away	9	Ashland	18–21	L	First round	Bearcats had their 39 game winning streak broken earlier in season with 2 MIAA losses and lost its #1 ranking which it held for the first half of the season
2018	14	Away	7	Grand Valley State	42–17	W	First round	
2018	14	Away	2	Ferris State	21–27	L	Second round	
2019	10	Maryville	12	Harding	7–6	W	First round	
2019	10	Maryville	–	Lindenwood	63–7	W	Second round	
2019	10	Away	2	Ferris State	3–25	L	Quarterfinal	
2021	3	Maryville	–	Central Washington	50–21	W	First round	
2021	3	Away	7	Harding	28–9	W	Second round	
2021	3	Away	1	Ferris State	20–41	L	Quarterfinal	
2022	8	Away	3	Ouachita Baptist	47–17	W	First round	
2022	8	Away	1	Grand Valley State	8–13	L	Second round	
2025	14	Away	2	Harding	16–38	L	First round	

== Records ==
Year	Coach	W	L	T	MIAA	NCAA D2
1908	Paul A. White	3	2	1		
1916	George Palfreyman	2	5			
1917	George Palfreyman	0	7			
1918	M.H. Simms	1	1			
1919	Robert Rice	0	4			
1920	Robert Rice	0	3			
1921	Russell Sprong	2	6			
1922	Eugene Maynor	4	4			
1923	H.F. Lawrence	3	3	1		
1924	H.F. Lawrence	6	1	1		
1925	H.F. Lawrence	7	0	1	X	
1926	H.F. Lawrence	6	2			
1927	E.A. Davis	1	7			
1928	E.A. Davis	5	3	1		
1929	E.A. Davis	3	2	3		
1930	E.A. Davis	4	5	1		
1931	E.A. Davis	9	0		X	
1932	E.A. Davis	4	4	1		
1933	E.A. Davis	1	8			
1934	E.A. Davis	4	5			
1935	E.A. Davis	3	5	1		
1936	E.A. Davis	4	4	1		
1937	Ryland Milner	2	5	2		
1938	Ryland Milner	9	0		X	
1939	Ryland Milner	9	0		X	
1940	Ryland Milner	7	2			
1941	Ryland Milner	6	2	1	X	
1942	Ryland Milner	4	2	1	X	
1943	Ryland Milner	5	1	1		
1944	Ryland Milner	7	0			
1946	Ryland Milner	4	3			
1947	Ryland Milner	5	2	2		
1948	Ryland Milner	6	2		X	
1949	Ryland Milner	5	2	1		
1950	Ryland Milner	3	5	1		
1951	Ryland Milner	2	6	1		
1952	Ryland Milner	6	3		X	
1953	Ryland Milner	3	4	1		
1954	Ryland Milner	2	6			
1955	Ryland Milner	2	5	1		
1956	Ryland Milner	2	7			
1957	Ryland Milner	1	6	1		
1958	Paul Turner	0	8			
1959	Paul Turner	3	3	2		
1960	Earl Baker	5	4			
1961	Earl Baker	2	7			
1962	Earl Baker	0	9			
1963	Ivan Schottel	3	5	1		
1964	Ivan Schottel	6	3			
1965	Ivan Schottel	6	3			
1966	Ivan Schottel	4	5			
1967	Ivan Schottel	3	6			
1968	Ivan Schottel	0	9			
1969	Ivan Schottel	3	6			
1970	Ivan Schottel	2	8			
1971	Gladden Dye	4	5			
1972	Gladden Dye	7	3		X	
1973	Gladden Dye	6	4		X	
1974	Gladden Dye	8	2			
1975	Gladden Dye	7	3			
1976	Jim Redd	8	2			
1977	Jim Redd	5	5	1		
1978	Jim Redd	0	11			
1979	Jim Redd	6	5		X	
1980	Jim Redd	2	8			
1981	Jim Redd	6	4			
1982	Jim Redd	2	7	1		
1983	Vernon Thomsen	5	6			
1984	Vernon Thomsen	10	2		X	First round
1985	Vernon Thomsen	4	6	1		
1986	Vernon Thomsen	2	9			
1987	Vernon Thomsen	3	8			
1988	Harold "Bud" Elliott	2	9			
1989	Harold "Bud" Elliott	9	3			First round
1990	Harold "Bud" Elliott	2	8	1		
1991	Harold "Bud" Elliott	5	6			
1992	Harold "Bud" Elliott	6	5			
1993	Harold "Bud" Elliott	3	8			
1994	Mel Tjeerdsma	0	11			
1995	Mel Tjeerdsma	6	5			
1996	Mel Tjeerdsma	11	2		X	Quarterfinals
1997	Mel Tjeerdsma	12	1		X	Quarterfinals
1998	Mel Tjeerdsma	15	0		X	National champions
1999	Mel Tjeerdsma	14	1		X	National champions
2000	Mel Tjeerdsma	11	1		X	First round
2001	Mel Tjeerdsma	7	4			
2002	Mel Tjeerdsma	12	1		X	Quarterfinals
2003	Mel Tjeerdsma	8	3		X	
2004	Mel Tjeerdsma	11	2			Quarterfinals
2005	Mel Tjeerdsma	11	4			Runner-Up
2006	Mel Tjeerdsma	14	1		X	Runner-Up
2007	Mel Tjeerdsma	12	2		X	Runner-Up
2008	Mel Tjeerdsma	13	2		X	Runner-Up
2009	Mel Tjeerdsma	14	1		X	National champions
2010	Mel Tjeerdsma	12	2		X	Semifinals
2011	Adam Dorrel	11	3			Quarterfinal
2012	Adam Dorrel	11	3			Second round
2013	Adam Dorrel	15	0		X	National champions
2014	Adam Dorrel	10	2	0	X	First round
2015	Adam Dorrel	15	0	0	X	National champions
2016	Adam Dorrel	15	0	0	X	National champions
2017	Rich Wright	9	3	0		First round
2018	Rich Wright	10	3	0	X	Second round
2019	Rich Wright	12	2	0	X	Quarterfinal
2021	Rich Wright	11	2	0	X	Quarterfinal
2022	Rich Wright	10	3	0		Second round
2023	Rich Wright	7	4	0		
2024	Rich Wright	6	5	0		
2025	John McMenamin	9	3	0	X	First round

== Coaching death ==
On June 5, 2011 Bearcats head coach Scott Bostwick died of an apparent heart attack in Maryville. The 49-year-old Bostwick had been named head coach of the Bearcats in December 2010 following the retirement of longtime coach Mel Tjeerdsma. Bostwick had been on the Northwest coaching staff since 1994, and most recently had served as defensive coordinator under Tjeerdsma. In 2007, Bostwick had been voted the American Football Coaches Association Division II Assistant Coach of the Year.

== Notable players and coaches ==
- Josh Baker – NFL tight end who is currently a free agent.
- Baron Corbin (Thomas "Tom" Pestock) – Former offensive lineman for Indianapolis Colts and Arizona Cardinals. Now a professional wrestler.
- Brandon Dixon – defensive back who currently plays for the Pittsburgh Steelers.
- Brian Dixon – defensive back who currently plays for the Arizona Cardinals.
- Tommy Frevert – American football placekicker
- Chris Greisen – former quarterback in the NFL.
- Chad Kilgore – NFL linebacker who is currently a free agent.
- Matt Longacre – NFL defensive end for the Los Angeles Rams.
- Tony Miles – retired CFL wide receiver; school's all-time leader in receptions, receiving yards and receiving touchdowns.
- Xavier Omon – retired NFL running back.
- Michael Peterson – Retired tight end. Former player with the Omaha Nighthawks of the United Football League.
- Jamaica Rector – former NFL and CFL wide receiver.
- Mel Tjeerdsma – Northwest's national championship winning coach, and most winning Division II post-season coach with 22 victories.
- Dave Tollefson – Retired NFL defensive end.
- Seth Wand – Former NFL offensive lineman
