= 2013 Northwest Missouri State Bearcats football team =

American college football season

2013 Northwest Missouri State Bearcats football

NCAA Division II national champion MIAA champion

NCAA Division II Championship Game, W 43–28 vs. Lenoir–Rhyne
- Conference: Mid-America Intercollegiate Athletics Association

Ranking
- AFCA: No. 1
- Record: 15–0 (10–0 MIAA)
- Head coach: Adam Dorrel (3rd season)
- Offensive coordinator: Charlie Flohr (7th season)
- Defensive coordinator: Rich Wright (3rd season)
- Home stadium: Bearcat Stadium

2013 Mid-America Intercollegiate Athletics Association football standings
	Conf.			Overall
Team	W		L	W		L
No. 1 NW Missouri State $^	10	–	0	15	–	0
No. 20 Emporia State ^	9	–	1	9	–	2
No. 19 Pittsburg State #	7	–	2	10	–	2
Missouri Western	7	–	3	8	–	3
Washburn	7	–	3	8	–	3
Missouri Southern	5	–	3	7	–	3
Central Missouri	5	–	4	6	–	4
Fort Hays State	4	–	5	6	–	5
Nebraska–Kearney	3	–	6	3	–	8
Lindenwood	2	–	6	3	–	6
Lincoln (MO)	2	–	8	3	–	8
Central Oklahoma	2	–	8	2	–	8
Northeastern State	2	–	8	2	–	9
Southwest Baptist	1	–	9	1	–	10
$ – Conference champion; ^ – NCAA Division II playoff participant; # – Mineral Water Bowl participant; Rankings from AFCA poll

The 2013 Northwest Missouri State Bearcats football team represented Northwest Missouri State University as a member of the Mid-America Intercollegiate Athletics Association (MIAA) during the 2013 NCAA Division II football season. Led by third-year head coach Adam Dorrel, the team finished the regular season with an undefeated 11–0 record. They won their fifth NCAA Division II Football Championship with a win over Lenoir–Rhyne in the NCAA Division II Championship Game by a score of 43–28. The Bearcats played their home games at Bearcat Stadium in Maryville, Missouri, which has been the Bearcats' home stadium since 1917.

== Schedule ==
Date	Opponent	Rank	Site	TV	Result
September 5	No. 22 Saginaw Valley State*	No. 4	Bearcat Stadium; Maryville, MO		W 45–24
September 14	Central Missouri	No. 3	Bearcat Stadium; Maryville, MO		W 28–24
September 21	at Fort Hays State	No. 3	Lewis Field Stadium; Hays, KS		W 49–14
September 28	Nebraska–Kearney	No. 3	Bearcat Stadium; Maryville, MO		W 53–7
October 5	at Northeastern State	No. 3	Doc Wadley Stadium; Tahlequah, OK		W 40–12
October 12	Central Oklahoma	No. 3	Bearcat Stadium; Maryville, MO		W 72–10
October 19	vs. No. 7 Pittsburg State	No. 2	Arrowhead Stadium; Kansas City, MO (rivalry)		W 24–15
October 26	Missouri Southern	No. 2	Bearcat Stadium; Maryville, MO		W 43–7
November 2	No. 8 Washburn	No. 2	Bearcat Stadium; Maryville, MO		W 52–21
November 9	at No. 10 Emporia State	No. 2	Francis G. Welch Stadium; Emporia, KS		W 48–21
November 16	at No. 19 Missouri Western	No. 2	Spratt Stadium; St. Joseph, MO (rivalry)		W 51–21
November 30	No. 5 Minnesota–Duluth*	No. 2	Bearcat Stadium; Maryville, MO (NCAA Division II Second Round)		W 45–21
December 7	No. 12 St. Cloud State*	No. 2	Bearcat Stadium; Maryville, MO (NCAA Division II Quarterfinal)		W 59–21
December 14	No. 22 Grand Valley State*	No. 2	Bearcat Stadium; Maryville, MO (NCAA Division II Semifinal)		W 27–13
December 21	No. 13 Lenoir–Rhyne*	No. 2	Braly Municipal Stadium; Florence, AL (NCAA Division II Championship)	ESPN2	W 43–28
*Non-conference game; Rankings from American Football Coaches Association Poll released prior to the game

== Coaching staff ==
Northwest Missouri State Bearcats
Name	Position	Consecutive season at Northwest Missouri State in current position	Previous position	NWMSU profile
Adam Dorrel	Head coach	3rd	Northwest Missouri State offensive coordinator and offensive line coach (2007–2010)	
Charlie Flohr	Offensive coordinator	8th	Truman wide receivers coach (2004–2005)	
Rich Wright	Defensive coordinator	3rd	Northwest Missouri State defensive line coach (2004–2010)	
Joel Osborn	Wide receivers coach and recruiting coordinator	2nd	Northwest Missouri State graduate assistant (2009–2011)	
Ken Gordon	Special teams coordinator and secondary coach	3rd	Emporia State defensive coordinator (2007–2010)	
Chad Bostwick	Linebackers coach	3rd	Central Missouri linebackers coach and special teams coordinator (2011)	

== Roster ==
2013 Northwest Missouri State Bearcats football team roster
Players
Coaches
Offense

Pos.	#	Name	Class
WR	7	Jason Jozaites	Jr
WR	8	Clint Utter	Sr
WR	9	Korey Jackson	Jr
QB	10	Brady Bolles	So
RB	11	Justin Fulks	Fr
WR	12	Reuben Thomas	Jr
QB	15	Trevor Adams	Sr
QB	16	Kyle Zimmerman	Fr
WR	17	Haden Bryant	Fr
WR	18	Bryce Young	Jr
RB	20	Kohlman Adema-Schulte	Jr
RB	22	Billy Creason	Sr
RB	24	Robert Burton III	Jr
RB	28	Phil Jackson II	Fr
RB	35	Brad Dinwiddie	Fr
FB	45	Josh Swanson	So
WR	49	Zach Kallman	So
OL	58	Bryce Johnston	Sr
OL	59	Brandon Sleep	Fr
OL	60	Jake Scarbo	Sr
OL	61	Zach Callahan	Fr
OL	62	Chase Sherman	Fr
OL	63	Kolton Cline	So
OL	64	Kyle Meyer	Fr
OL	65	Cole Chevalier	Jr
OL	66	Jamie Thieman	Fr
OL	67	Daniel Kempf	So
OL	70	CJ Keeney	Jr
OL	71	John Petroff	Sr
OL	72	Savontae Brown	Jr
OL	76	Shane Smith	So
OL	78	Cody Carlson	Sr
OL	79	Dylan Morris	Fr
WR	80	Michael Wickham	Fr
TE	81	Marcus Wright	Jr
WR	83	Preston Pedersen	So
WR	84	Quanzee Johnson	Fr
TE	85	Alex Visk	So
TE	86	Joel Gantz	Sr
WR	87	Cole Jones	Fr
WR	88	Simon Mathiesen	Fr
TE	90	TJ Schieber	Fr
TE	92	Brock Behrndt	Fr
OL		Jimmy Alloway	Fr
QB		Jonathan Baker	Fr
WR		Jordan Bishop	Fr
RB		Austin Dawkins	Fr
WR		Derrick Dow	Fr
TE		Sam Gill	Fr
OL		Scott Gourley	Fr
RB		Jordan Grove	Fr
OL		Ryan Huff	Fr
OL		Dylan Jones	Fr
OL		Landon Kubicek	Fr
OL		Myles McIntyre	Fr
WR		Patrick Partee	Fr
QB		Randy Schmidt	Fr
WR		Bryce Sheard	Fr
QB		Brad Strauss	Fr
OL		Noah Taylor	Fr
RB		Cameron Wilcox	Fr
WR		Shane Williams	Fr
TE		Clayton Wilson	Fr

Defense

Pos.	#	Name	Class
DB	1	Brandon Dixon	Sr
DB	2	Brian Dixon	Sr
S	3	Alex Taylor	So
CB	5	Jack Young	Fr
CB	6	Travis Manning	Jr
S	13	Dylan Chadwick	Jr
DB	14	Jared Fox	Jr
DB	19	Carson Klocko	Fr
DE	21	Matt Meinert	Sr
S	23	Kevin Berg	Fr
CB	25	Tyshaan Alleyne	So
S	26	Denver Lohnes	Jr
CB	27	Robert Mann	So
S	29	Bryce Enyard	So
LB	33	Connor Wilson	Fr
DE	34	Collin Bevins	Fr
LB	36	D.J. Gnader	Jr
LB	39	Sean O'Connor	Fr
S	40	Cale Korbelik	Fr
LB	41	Jordan Van Roekel	Fr
DT	42	Bryant Hummel	Sr
LB	43	Jacob Vollstedt	Fr
LB	46	Brock Sherman	So
LB	47	Cody Matthewson	Jr
LB	50	Zach Maloley	So
LB	51	Eric Reimer	Jr
LB	52	Jayron Robinson	Jr
DB	54	DeAndre Thomas	Fr
LB	55	Cole Forney	Fr
DT	73	Cass Weitl	Fr
DE	89	Montay Simmons	Jr
DE	91	Zach Williams	Sr
DT	93	Tristan Patterson	So
DE	94	Jodran Chrisman	Jr
DT	95	Trey Randle	Fr
DE	96	Matt Longacre	Jr
DE	98	Kevin Arnold	Jr
DT	99	Brandon Yost	So
LB		Jarrod Bishop	Fr
DL		Ben Calamari	Fr
DL		Luke Drazic	Fr
DL		Bobby Gruenloh	Fr
DL		Jordan Harold	Fr
DL		Zach Hughes	Fr
DL		Keaton Hulett	Fr
DB		Marcus Jones	Fr
DL		Caleb Mather	Fr
CB		Erick Mayo	Fr
CB		Brandon Miller	Fr
DL		Jamie Nix	Fr
DL		Lane Pennington	Fr
CB		Edward Richey	Fr
DL		Jimmy Sellers	Fr
LB		Michael Sherinian	Fr
DL		Trent Sluder	Fr
DL		Josh Spiller	Fr
DL		Cory Stattelman	Fr
LB		Nicholas Turner	Fr
S		Wes Williams	Fr

Special teams

Pos.	#	Name	Class
P	4	Kyle Goodburn	Jr
K	30	Ben Trewyn	Fr
LS	77	Colby Bowers	Fr
K		Alex Easley	Fr

Head coach

- Adam Dorrel

Coordinators/assistant coaches

- Rich Wright – Assistant Coach- Defensive Coordinator
- Charlie Flohr – Assistant Coach- Offensive Coordinator
- Joel Osborn – Assistant Coach- Wide Receivers/Recruiting Coordinator
- Ken Gordon – Assistant Coach- Special Teams/Secondary
- Chad Bostwick – Assistant Coach- Linebackers

Legend

- (C) Team captain
- (S) Suspended
- (I) Ineligible
- Injured
- Redshirt

Roster
