= Hannah Gladden =

American wrestler

Personal information
- Born: August 13, 1996 (age 29)

Professional wrestling career
- Billed height: 5 ft 4 in (163 cm)
- Billed weight: 170 lb (77 kg)

Hannah Gladden is an American wrestler from Alabama who won the 2013 Pan American FILA Wrestling World Championships in Medellín, Colombia

== Early life ==
Gladden attended Southside High School till May 2010 and then was transferred to Gadsden City High in September of the same year. There, her wrestling record was 16-22 during 2010 to 2011 season. During her senior year she wrestled not only girls but also boys from such High Schools as Oneonta and Springville. On February 16, 2012 she lost to both Caleb Ellerbee from Lee-Montgomery High School and then lost to Ben Harrison from Hewitt-Trussville High as well. In 2011 she wrestled against Brandon Estes to whom she eventually lost.

== Career ==
On April 28, 2012 she participated at the Pigeon Forge Wrestling Classic in Pigeon Forge, Tennessee and in the summer of the same year joined the Olympics. Following that, she attended women matches at Lakeland, Florida from May 11–13 and then held 2–1 record in freestyle wrestling in such states as Pennsylvania and Michigan. On May 16, 2012 she held 3–0 record in Atlanta, Georgia as well as Tennessee and North Carolina. In July 2012 she took part in the national tournament in Fargo, North Dakota.

In 2013 she became a champion at the 2013 Pan American FILA Wrestling World Championships in Medellín, Colombia. Before competing for the Pan American games she was a wrestler at the East Alabama Wrestling Club and Alabaster based Alabama Wrestling Chicks, a division of Warrior Wrestling Club.
