= Mustang (motorcycle) =

The Mustang was a lightweight motorcycle built by Gladden Products Corporation in Glendale, California, from 1946 to 1965. The second production version, the Mustang Model 2, was among the first motorcycle manufactured in the United States to have a telescopic fork.

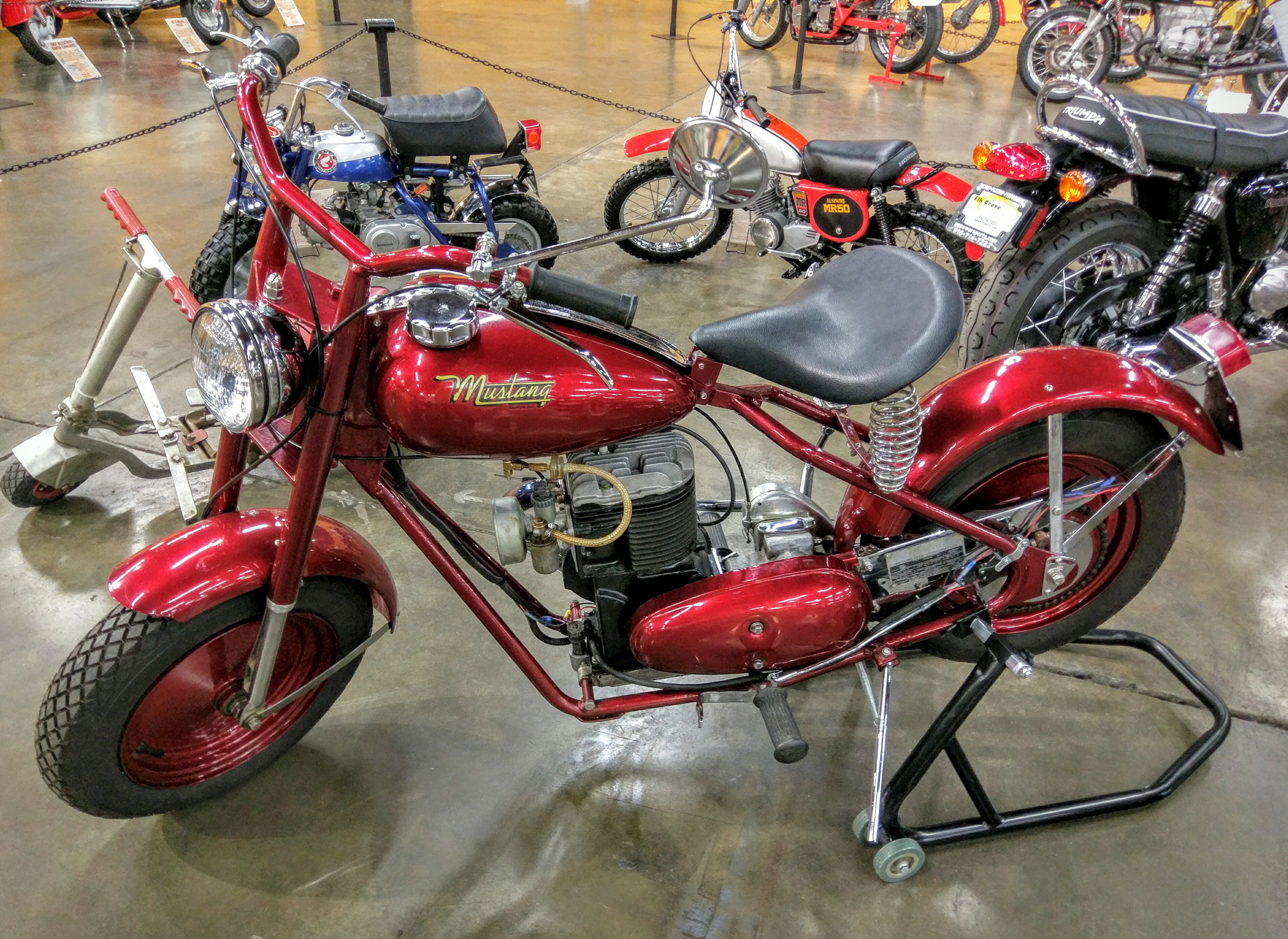
1951 Mustang Pony on display at the California Automobile Museum

== History ==
=== Origin ===
Howard Forrest, an engineer and former midget car racer, designed and built a 19.2 cu in (315 cc) water-cooled four-cylinder engine in 1936. In 1941, Forrest built a motorcycle powered by the engine, and he commuted to work at Gladden Products on the motorcycle during World War II. Company president John Gladden had Forrest and co-worker Chuck Gardner design a commuter motorcycle based on Forrest's custom bike, and started Mustang Motorcycle Corporation as a division of Gladden Products. The factory was located at the corner of S. Brand Boulevard and E. Colorado Blvd. in Glendale, California. historical shop photos The minibike was assisted by local engineer, Council Tucker, of Glendale, CA. Graduate of USC & Georgia Tech. He had served 4 years in the USN as an Engineer during WW2.

=== Villiers engined models ===
Prototypes built during the war used pre-war Villiers 191 cubic centimetres (11.7 cu in) "Double Century" engines. These were no longer available at the end of the war, so the Mustang Colt, the first production version of the Mustang motorcycle, used a 125 cubic centimetres (7.6 cu in) Villiers engine in a downsized frame with 8-inch (200 mm) wheels. 235 Colts were made before the supply of Villiers engines began to dwindle.

=== Model 2 and DeliverCycle ===
Mustang engine

Overview
- Manufacturer: Busy Bee, a subsidiary of Gladden Products Corp.
- Production: before 1947 - 1965

Layout
- Configuration: single-cylinder engine
- Displacement: 19.48 cu in (319.2 cc)
- Cylinder bore: 2.875 in (73.0 mm)>
- Piston stroke: 3.00 in (76 mm)
- Cylinder block material: Meehanite (cast iron)
- Cylinder head material: aluminium alloy
- Valvetrain: side valve

Combustion
- Fuel system: carburetor, 7/8 in. Amal or 22 mm Dell'Orto
- Management: flywheel magneto
- Fuel type: gasoline
- Oil system: wet sump
- Cooling system: air-cooled

Output
- Power output: 5 hp (restricted output); 9.5 hp (Standard, Pony, Bronco, 1956-1958 Colt); 10.5 hp (Stallion); 12.5 hp (Thoroughbred)

Chronology
- Predecessor: 125 cc Villiers engine

Gladden bought the Busy Bee Company, a manufacturer of small engines, to ensure supply for later Mustang motorcycles. He then had Forrest and Gardner rework the Mustang design around a Busy Bee 320 cc side-valve single-cylinder engine. The resulting Model 2 formed the basic design for most later Mustangs, with the Busy Bee engine, a three speed Burman transmission, and 12-inch (300 mm) wheels. The Mustang Model 2 was the first motorcycle manufactured in the United States to use telescopic forks.

Production of the Model 2 began in 1947. Initial problems like noisy timing gears were remedied with special quality control measures, which included having the production foreman test and personally approve each engine that left the plant. The 1948 Model 3 DeliverCycle, a three-wheeled commercial vehicle used for parking enforcement by city police departments, was developed from the Model 2. Production of the DeliverCycle began in 1948.

=== Model 4 and derivatives ===
The Model 2 was further developed into the 1950 Model 4 "Standard" with more reliable components and with the intake and exhaust ports facing forward instead of rearward as they had faced in the Model 2. A Model 4 "Special" was derived from this, with engine performance upgrades. The DeliverCycle was similarly upgraded and became the Model 5.

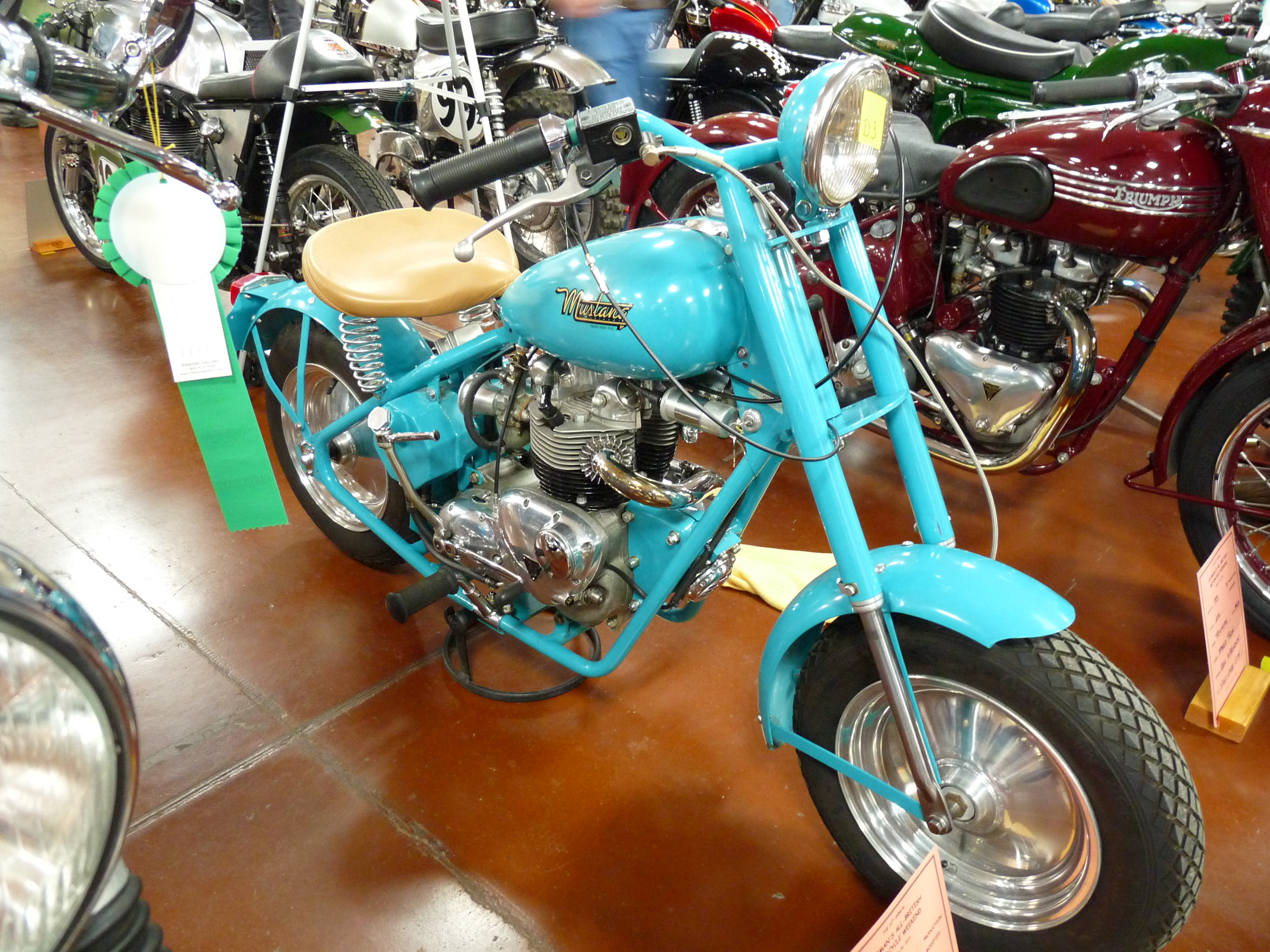
Customized Mustang motorcycle with a Triumph engine installed

The Model 4 Standard evolved into the 9.5 hp (7.1 kW) Pony and the Bronco, the latter of which had the Pony's drivetrain and a standard front brake. The Model 4 Special evolved into the Stallion, with a 10.5 hp (7.8 kW) engine, a four-speed transmission, and two-tone paint. The best-selling of these was the Pony, which became the base model of the brand.

=== Colt, Thoroughbred, and Trail Machine ===
In 1956, Mustang discontinued the slow-selling DeliverCycle and introduced a new Colt as a budget model. This second Colt model was a stripped-down version of the Pony, with an undamped leading link fork, a centrifugal clutch, and no transmission. The Colt was discontinued in 1958.

Mustang introduced the Thoroughbred in 1960. Based on the Stallion, the Thoroughbred had a revised frame featuring swingarm rear suspension, a dual seat, and optional storage under the seat. The engine was uprated to 12.5 hp (9.3 kW) and powered the Stallion's four-speed transmission. The handlebars of the Thoroughbred were welded to the forks, preventing adjustment or replacement of the bars.

The Trail Machine was introduced in 1961. Unlike earlier Mustangs, it was powered by an upright Briggs & Stratton 5.75 hp engine; this was coupled to the usual 3-speed Burman motorcycle transmission and a rear tyre with a tractor tread. These components were mounted in a new, specialized frame constructed of heavy duty 7/8" tubular steel. Originally available only with a rigid rear end, the Trail Machine gained a version with a swingarm rear suspension in 1964.

=== Decline and demise ===
Sales began to decline in 1956. The Colt, the Thoroughbred, and the Trail Machine were developed to improve sales. By 1960, when the Thoroughbred was released, Mustang had fired Forrest and replaced him as head of design with Gardner. The DeliverCycle, which had been withdrawn in 1956 due to low sales figures, was reintroduced in 1963 and upgraded in 1964.

Production of Mustang motorcycles ended in 1965. Reasons for this have been given as the unavailability of Burman gearboxes, competition from Honda, and problems within management.

== Racing and custom bikes ==
Forrest built special racing engines for factory rider Walt Fulton. Fulton raced Mustangs in the Lightweight class until the AMA required racing motorcycles to have wheels with a diameter of sixteen inches or greater.

Forrest built several custom motorcycles based on Mustang frames, including one powered by an Ariel Square Four engine.
