= George Palfreyman =

American football and basketball coach

Biographical details
- Born: May 17, 1893
- Died: November 7, 1936 (aged 43); Topeka, Kansas, U.S.

Playing career

Basketball
- 1912–1915: Missouri

Coaching career (HC unless noted)

Football
- 1916–1917: Maryville Normal

Basketball
- 1915–1918: Maryville Normal

Head coaching record
- Overall: 2–13 (football); 19–10 (basketball)

George "Speed" Palfreyman Jr. (May 17, 1893 – November 7, 1936) was an American college football and college basketball coach. He was the second head football coach at Fifth District Normal School—now known as Northwest Missouri State University—in Maryville, Missouri, serving for two seasons, from 1916 to 1917, and compiling a record of 2–13. He was also the school's head basketball coach from 1915 to 1918, tallying a mark of 19–10.

After graduating from Benton High School in St. Joseph, Missouri, Palfreyman played basketball at the University of Missouri from 1912 to 1915 and was captain of the team in 1914–15. He taught at a high school in Maryville and was then employed by the Goodrich Tire Company as an assistant manager in Milwaukee. He also worked for Goodrich in Chicago and Akron, Ohio. Palfreyman died at the age of 43, on November 7, 1936, at the home of his parents in Topeka, Kansas.

== Head coaching record ==
=== Football ===
| Year | Team | Overall | Conference | Standing | Bowl/playoffs |
|---|---|---|---|---|---|
Maryville Normal Bearcats (Missouri Intercollegiate Athletic Association) (1916–1917)
| 1916 | Maryville Normal | 2–5 | 0–5 | 10th | |
| 1917 | Maryville Normal | 0–8 | 0–7 | 10th | |
| Fifth District Normal: | | 2–13 | 0–12 | | |
| Total: | | 2–13 | | | |
