= Gladden Dye =

American football player and coach

Biographical details
- Born: c. 1934

Playing career
- 1953–1954: William Jewell

Coaching career (HC unless noted)
- 1957–1959: Potosi HS (MO)
- 1960: Ruskin HS (MO)
- 1961–1964: Eastgate Jr. HS (MO)
- 1965–1970: Oak Park HS (MO)
- 1971–1975: Northwest Missouri State

Head coaching record
- Overall: 32–17 (college)

Accomplishments and honors

Championships
- 2 MIAA (1972, 1974)

Gladden Dye Jr. (born c. 1934) is an American former football coach. He was the 13th head football coach at Northwest Missouri State University in Maryville, Missouri, serving for five seasons, from 1971 to 1975, and compiling a record of 32–17. Dye attended William Jewell College, where he lettered in football for three years.

== Head coaching record ==
=== College ===
Year	Team	Overall	Conference	Standing	Bowl/playoffs
Northwest Missouri State Bearcats (Missouri Intercollegiate Athletic Association) (1971–1975)
1971	Northwest Missouri State	4–5	2–4	T–5th	
1972	Northwest Missouri State	7–3	5–1	T–1st	
1973	Northwest Missouri State	6–4	4–2	2nd	
1974	Northwest Missouri State	8–2	5–1	1st	
1975	Northwest Missouri State	7–3	3–3	T–3rd	
Northwest Missouri State:		32–17	19–11		
Total:		32–17			
National championship Conference title Conference division title or championship game berth
