= Lenoir–Rhyne Bears football =

Football program of Lenoir–Rhyne University, North Carolina, USA

- First season: 1907; 119 years ago
- Head coach: Doug Socha; 3rd season, 16–8 (.667)
- Location: Hickory, North Carolina
- Stadium: Moretz Stadium (capacity: 7,200)
- NCAA division: Division II
- Conference: South Atlantic Conference
- Colors: Cardinal and black
- All-time record: 562–475–34 (.541)

NAIA national championships
- 1960

Conference championships
- 23 (10 SAC, 8 NSC, 5 CC)
- Rivalries: Newberry, Wingate, Catawba
- Mascot: Joe Bear
- Marching band: Spirit of Lenoir-Rhyne
- Website: LRBears.com

The Lenoir–Rhyne Bears football program is the intercollegiate American football team for Lenoir–Rhyne University located in the U.S. state of North Carolina. The team competes in the NCAA Division II and are members of the South Atlantic Conference. Lenoir–Rhyne's first football team was fielded in 1907. The team plays its home games at the 7,200 seat Moretz Stadium in Hickory, North Carolina.

== Conference history ==
- 1954–1969: NAIA
- 1970–1988: NAIA Division I
- 1989–present: NCAA Division II

=== Conference affiliations ===
- 1907–1930: Independent
- 1931–1960: North State Conference
- 1961–1974: Carolinas Conference
- 1975–present: South Atlantic Conference

The Bears had no team from 1912–1920 and 1942–1945.

== Postseason appearances ==
=== Bowl games ===
The Bears have participated in five postseason bowl games, compiling a 3–2 record.

Season	Game	Date	Opponent	Result	Location
1951	Pythian Bowl	December 8, 1951	California (PA)	W 13–7	Salisbury, North Carolina
1952	Cigar Bowl	December 13, 1952	Tampa	L 12–21	Tampa, Florida
1955	Palmetto Shrine	December 10, 1955	Newberry	W 14–13	Columbia, South Carolina
1959	Holiday Bowl (NAIA)	December 19, 1959	Texas A&I	L 20–7	St. Petersburg, Florida
1960	Holiday Bowl (NAIA)	December 10, 1960	Humboldt State	W 15–14	St. Petersburg, Florida

=== NCAA Division II playoffs ===
The Bears have made eight appearances in the NCAA Division II playoffs. Their combined record is 12–8, with one appearance in the NCAA Division II championship game (2013).

Year	Round	Opponent	Result
2012	First Round; Second Round	Fort Valley State; Carson–Newman	W, 21–6; L, 35–38
2013	Second Round; Quarterfinals; Semifinals; National Championship	Carson–Newman; North Alabama; West Chester; NW Missouri State	W, 27–20; W, 42–39; W, 42–14; L, 28–43
2014	Second Round	Valdosta State	L, 21–23
2018	First Round; Second Round; Quarterfinals	Florida Tech; Wingate; Valdosta State	W, 43–21; W, 21–17; L, 21–61
2019	First Round; Second Round; Quarterfinals	Miles; Carson–Newman; West Florida	W, 36–7; W, 49–21; L, 38–43
2021	First Round	Bowie State	L, 10–31
2023	First Round; Second Round; Quarterfinals; Semifinals	Shepherd; Benedict; Valdosta State; Harding	W, 63–17; W, 35–25; W, 35–7; L, 14–55
2024	First Round; Second Round	West Alabama; Virginia Union	W, 37–34; L, 12–44

=== NAIA ===
Lenoir–Rhyne made three appearances in the NAIA playoffs, with a combined record of 3–2–1.

Year	Round	Opponent	Result
1959	Semifinals; National Championship	Southern Connecticut State; Texas A&I	W, 47–20; L, 7–20
1960	Semifinals; National Championship	Northern Michigan; Humboldt State	T, 20–20; W, 15–14
1962	Semifinals; National Championship	Northern State; Central State (OK)	W, 20–7; L, 13–28

== Coaches ==
Clarence Stasavich has the most victories as coach of the Bears.

- Tom Warlick (1907–1908)
- Burton H. Schoeff (1909)
- Daniel M. Williams (1910–1911)
- Phil Utley (1921)
- Norman Lamotte (1922–1923)
- Dick Gurley (1924–1931)
- Robert M. Shores (1932–1936)
- Albert Spurlock (1937)
- Robert M. Shores (1938–1941)
- D. M. Williams (1942–1945)
- Clarence Stasavich (1946–1961)
- Hanley Painter (1962–1972)
- Danny Williams (1973)
- Jack Huss (1974–1979)
- Henry Vansant (1980–1983)
- John Perry (1984–1990)
- Charles Forbes (1991–1996)
- Bill Hart (1997–2001)
- Wayne Hicks (2002–2006)
- Fred Goldsmith (2007–2010)
- Mike Houston (2011–2013)
- Ian Shields (2014–2015)
- Mike Kellar (2016–2017)
- Drew Cronic (2018–2019)
- Mike Jacobs (2020–2023)
- Doug Socha (2024–present)

== Notable former players ==
- Kyle Dugger – NFL safety, drafted 2nd round (37th overall) in the 2020 NFL draft by the New England Patriots
- Perry Fewell – former NFL coach
- Craig Keith – NFL tight end, drafted 7th round (189th overall) in the 1993 NFL draft by the Pittsburgh Steelers
- Donnie Kirkpatrick – former college football coach
- Tommy Laurendine – college football coach
- John Milem – NFL defensive end, drafted 5th round (150th overall) in the 2000 NFL draft by the San Francisco 49ers
- Hanley Painter – former college football coach
- Wes Phillips – NFL offensive tackle
- Jason Poe – NFL offensive guard
- Mike Pope – former NFL coach
- Clarence Stasavich – former college football coach
- Terence Steward – NFL wide receiver
- Don Testerman – NFL running back, drafted 10th round (282nd overall) in the 1976 NFL draft by the Miami Dolphins
- Dareke Young – NFL wide receiver/kick return specialist, drafted 7th round (233rd overall) in the 2022 NFL draft by the Seattle Seahawks

== Year-by-year results ==
Year W-L-T 1907 (0-3), 1908 (5-2-1), 1909 (3-5), 1910 (1-2), 1911 (3-3), —-NO TEAM 1912-1920—- 1921 (2-3), 1922 (1-5), 1923 (0-5), 1924 (5-4), 1925 (6-3), 1926 (7-2), 1927 (3-6-1), 1928 (2-6-1), 1929 (4-5-1), 1930 (3-6-1),

1939* (6–1–3), 1951 (10–1), 1952 (8–1), 1955 (9–0–1), 1956 (10–0), 1958 (9–1), 1959 (10–1), 1960 (12–0), 1961 (8–1–1), 1962 (11–1), 1965 (7–3), 1966* (6–3), 1967 (8–1), 1975 (7–3–1), 1988* (7–4), 1994* (8–2), 2005 (5–5), 2006 (3–8), 2007 (2–9), 2008 (3–8), 2009 (5–6), 2010 (7–4), 2011* (7–3), 2012 (9–3), 2013* (13–2), 2014* (11–1), 2015 (5–5), 2016 (3–8), 2017 (3–7), 2018* (12–2), 2019* (13–1), Spring 2020 (3-1)

== Championship appearances ==
The Bears made three appearances in the NAIA championship game during their tenure, winning in 1960, and appeared in the NCAA Division II championship game in 2013.

Year	Division	Coach	Opponent	Record	Score
1959	NAIA Playoffs	Clarence Stasavich	Texas A&I Javelinas	10–1	L 7–20
1960	NAIA Playoffs	Clarence Stasavich	Humboldt State	12–0	W 15–14
1962	NAIA Playoffs	Hanley Painter	Central State (OK)	11–1	L 13–28
2013	NCAA Division II Playoffs	Mike Houston	Northwest Missouri State	13–2	L 28–43

== Conference championships ==
1939* (6–1–3), 1951 (10–1), 1952 (8–1), 1955 (9–0–1), 1956 (10–0), 1958 (9–1), 1959 (10–1), 1960 (12–0), 1961 (8–1–1), 1962 (11–1), 1965 (7–3), 1966* (6–3), 1967 (8–1), 1975 (7–3–1), 1988* (7–4), 1994* (8–2), 2011* (7–3), 2012 (9–3), 2013 (13–2), 2014 (11–1), 2018 (12–2), 2019 (13–1)

*denotes co-championship. The Bears won 8 titles in the North State Conference, 5 in the Carolinas Conference, and 9 in the South Atlantic Conference.
