= Rich Wright =

American football coach

Current position
- Title: Defensive coordinator & defensive line coach
- Team: Central Missouri
- Conference: MIAA

Biographical details
- Born: Hamilton, New York, U.S.
- Education: Dana College (1995)

Coaching career (HC unless noted)
- 1991–1992: Cortland (GA)
- 1993–1994: Dana (GA)
- 1995–1996: Northwest Missouri State (GA)
- 1997: Dakota State (DC)
- 1998: Central Methodist (assistant)
- 1999: William Penn (assistant)
- 2000–2003: St. Ambrose (DC)
- 2004–2010: Northwest Missouri State (DL)
- 2011–2016: Northwest Missouri State (DC)
- 2017–2024: Northwest Missouri State
- 2025–present: Central Missouri (DC/DL)

Head coaching record
- Overall: 65–22
- Tournaments: 6–5 (NCAA D-II playoffs)

Accomplishments and honors

Championships
- 3 MIAA (2018–2019, 2021)

Richard Wright is an American college football coach. He is the defensive coordinator and defensive line coach for the University of Central Missouri, a position he has held since 2025. He was the head football coach for Northwest Missouri State University from 2017 to 2024. From 1991 to 1994, Wright held several assistant coaching jobs in Nebraska and New York. In 1995, Wright became a graduate assistant for Northwest Missouri State, where he was earning his master's degree, for two seasons. In 1997, Wright moved to South Dakota for an assistant coaching job. Following South Dakota, Wright spent time in Missouri and Iowa, before returning to Missouri in 2004. In 2004, Wright became the defensive line coach and coordinator of special teams at Northwest Missouri State, and eventually moved to defensive coordinator and assistant head coach in 2011. In December 2016 after winning the National Championship—Wright's fourth—Wright was named the program's 20th head football coach.

== Head coaching record ==
Year	Team	Overall	Conference	Standing	Bowl/playoffs	AFCA^{#}
Northwest Missouri State Bearcats (Mid-America Intercollegiate Athletics Association) (2017–2024)
2017	Northwest Missouri State	9–3	9–2	2nd	L NCAA Division II First Round	16
2018	Northwest Missouri State	10–3	9–2	T–1st	L NCAA Division II Second Round	10
2019	Northwest Missouri State	12–2	10–1	T–1st	L NCAA Division II Quarterfinal	5
2020–21	No team—COVID-19					
2021	Northwest Missouri State	11–2	9–1	1st	L NCAA Division II Quarterfinal	4
2022	Northwest Missouri State	10–3	9–2	2nd	L NCAA Division II Second Round	8
2023	Northwest Missouri State	7–4	6–4	T–5th		
2024	Northwest Missouri State	6–5	5–4	T–5th		
Northwest Missouri State:		65–22	57–16			
Total:		65–22				
National championship Conference title Conference division title or championship game berth
^{#}Rankings from AFCA.
