= 2013 Lenoir–Rhyne Bears football team =

American college football season

2013 Lenoir–Rhyne Bears football

SAC champion

NCAA Division II Championship, L 28–43 vs. Northwest Missouri State
- Conference: South Atlantic Conference

Ranking
- AFCA: No. 2
- Record: 13–2 (7–0 SAC)
- Head coach: Mike Houston (3rd season)
- Offensive coordinator: Brent Thompson (4th season)
- Home stadium: Moretz Stadium

2013 South Atlantic Conference football standings
	Conf.			Overall
Team	W		L	W		L
No. 2 Lenoir–Rhyne $^	7	–	0	13	–	2
No. 17 Carson–Newman ^	5	–	2	10	–	3
No. 23 Newberry ^	5	–	2	9	–	3
Catawba	3	–	4	6	–	5
Wingate	3	–	4	4	–	6
Tusculum	2	–	5	4	–	7
Brevard	2	–	5	3	–	8
Mars Hill	1	–	6	3	–	8
$ – Conference champion; ^ – NCAA Division II playoff participant; Rankings from AFCA Poll

The 2013 Lenoir–Rhyne Bears football team represented Lenoir–Rhyne University as a member of the South Atlantic Conference (SAC) during the 2013 NCAA Division II football season. They were led by third-year head coach Mike Houston and played their home games at Moretz Stadium.

== Schedule ==
Date	Time	Opponent	Rank	Site	Result	Attendance
September 7	7:00 pm	Concord*		Moretz Stadium; Hickory, NC	L 10–18	7,257
September 14	7:00 pm	at Davidson*		Richardson Stadium; Davidson, NC	W 34–18	5,317
September 21	7:00 pm	at Wingate		Moretz Stadium; Hickory, NC	W 34–13	2,981
September 28	2:30 pm	at Tusculum		Pioneer Field; Greenville, TN	W 24–10	3,208
October 5	1:00 pm	Brevard^{†}		Moretz Stadium; Hickory, NC	W 41–0	7,346
October 12	2:00 pm	at North Greenville*		Younts Stadium; Tigerville, SC	W 35–17	3,245
October 19	2:00 pm	No. 23 Newberry		Moretz Stadium; Hickory, NC	W 35–14	5,196
October 26	1:00 pm	at Mars Hill	No. 24	Meares Stadium; Mars Hill, NC	W 27–20	2,803
November 2	2:00 pm	No. 16 Carson–Newman	No. 22	Moretz Stadium; Hickory, NC	W 37–3	7,891
November 9	12:00 pm	Alderson Broaddus*	No. 18	Moretz Stadium; Hickory, NC	W 62–24	4,371
November 16	1:30 pm	at Catawba	No. 14	Shuford Stadium; Salisbury, NC	W 48–15	3,374
November 30	12:00 pm	No. 18 Carson–Newman*	No. 13	Moretz Stadium; Hickory, NC (NCAA Division II Second Round)	W 27–20	4,146
December 7	12:00 pm	No. 16 North Alabama*	No. 13	Moretz Stadium; Hickory, NC (NCAA Division II Quarterfinal)	W 42–39	2,500
December 14	12:00 pm	No. 15 West Chester*	No. 13	Moretz Stadium; Hickory, NC (NCAA Division II Semifinal)	W 42–14	
December 21	11:05 am	vs. No. 2 Northwest Missouri State*	No. 13	Braly Municipal Stadium; Florence, AL (NCAA Division II Championship)	L 28–43	6,543
*Non-conference game; ^{†}Homecoming; Rankings from AFCA Poll released prior to the game; All times are in Eastern time
