= 2015 Nicholls State Colonels football team =

American college football season

2015 Nicholls State Colonels football
- Conference: Southland Conference
- Record: 3–8 (3–6 Southland)
- Head coach: Tim Rebowe (1st season)
- Offensive coordinator: Rob Christophel (1st season)
- Offensive scheme: Spread
- Defensive coordinator: Tommy Rybacki (1st season)
- Base defense: Multiple 4–3
- Home stadium: John L. Guidry Stadium

2015 Southland Conference football standings
	Conf.			Overall
Team	W		L	W		L
No. 7 McNeese State $^	9	–	0	10	–	1
No. 3 Sam Houston State ^	7	–	2	11	–	4
Central Arkansas	7	–	2	7	–	4
Incarnate Word *	5	–	4	6	–	5
Lamar	4	–	5	5	–	6
Northwestern State	4	–	5	4	–	7
Stephen F. Austin	4	–	5	4	–	7
SE Louisiana	3	–	6	4	–	7
Abilene Christian *	3	–	6	3	–	8
Nicholls State	3	–	6	3	–	8
Houston Baptist	0	–	8	2	–	9
$ – Conference champion; ^ – FCS playoff participant; * – ineligible for FCS playoffs due to transition from NCAA Division II; Rankings from STATS poll

The 2015 Nicholls State Colonels football team represented Nicholls State University as a member of the Southland Conference during the 2015 NCAA Division I FCS football season. Led by first-year head coach Tim Rebowe, the Colonels compiled an overall record of 3–8 with a mark of 3–6 in conference play, placing in a three-way tie for eighth in the Southland. Nicholls State played home games at John L. Guidry Stadium in Thibodaux, Louisiana.

== Previous season ==
Fifth-year head coach Charlie Stubbs resigned after the first three games. Steve Axman was named interim head coach and completed the 2014 season. The Colonels finished the season with a 0–12 overall record and were 0–8 in conference play.

On November 21, 2014, following the Colonels' season conclusion, Tim Rebowe was named the tenth head coach of the Nicholls State Colonels. Rebowe had been an assistant coach at University of Louisiana-Lafayette for eleven years as well as an assistant coach at Nicholls State for six years prior to that.

== Schedule ==
Date	Time	Opponent	Site	TV	Result	Attendance
September 12	6:00 pm	at Louisiana–Monroe*	Malone Stadium; Monroe, LA	ESPN3	L 0–47	20,397
September 19	2:00 pm	at Incarnate Word	Gayle and Tom Benson Stadium; San Antonio, TX	UIWtv	L 10–20	3,009
September 26	12:30 pm	at Colorado*	Folsom Field; Boulder, CO	P12N	L 0–48	37,302
October 3	3:00 pm	No. 23 McNeese State	John L. Guidry Stadium; Thibodaux, LA	COX	L 7–37	6,192
October 10	3:00 pm	at Stephen F. Austin	Homer Bryce Stadium; Nacogdoches, TX	ESPN3	L 24–28	5,523
October 17	3:00 pm	Houston Baptist	John L. Guidry Stadium; Thibodaux, LA		W 38–17	5,101
October 24	6:00 pm	at No. 9 Sam Houston State	Bowers Stadium; Huntsville, TX	FCS	L 7–37	5,104
October 31	3:00 pm	Northwestern State	John L. Guidry Stadium; Thibodaux, LA (NSU Challenge)	SLCTV	L 21–37	5,066
November 7	6:00 pm	at Lamar	Provost Umphrey Stadium; Beaumont, TX		W 30–28	7,730
November 14	3:00 pm	Central Arkansas^{†}	John L. Guidry Stadium; Thibodaux, LA	SLDN	L 31–34	5,002
November 19	6:00 pm	at Southeastern Louisiana	Strawberry Stadium; Hammond, LA (River Bell Classic)	ASN	W 27–24	5,491
*Non-conference game; ^{†}Homecoming; Rankings from STATS Poll released prior to the game; All times are in Central time

== Game summaries ==
=== @ Louisiana–Monroe ===
Nicholls at Louisiana–Monroe

Team	1	2	3	4	Total
Colonels	0	0	0	0	0
• Warhawks	10	30	0	7	47

- Date: September 12
- Location: Stadium
  Monroe, LA
- Game start: 6:00 PM CDT
- Elapsed time: 3:09
- Game attendance: 20,397
- Game weather: 78°F • NNW 14 • Clear
- Referee: Jason Autrey
- Television network: ESPN3

Scoring summary
1	11:07	Louisiana–Monroe	Craig Ford 25 yard field goal, Drive: 11 plays, 68 yards, 3:53	0–3
1	5:45	Louisiana–Monroe	DeVontae McNeal 3 yard run (Craig Ford kick), Drive: 11 plays, 51 yards, 3:59	0–10
2	12:08	Louisiana–Monroe	Garrett Smith 10 yard run (Craig Ford kick), Drive: 8 plays, 64 yards, 3:04	0–17
2	6:44	Louisiana–Monroe	Ajalen Holley 13 yard pass from Garrett Smith (Craig Ford kick), Drive: 7 plays, 52 yards, 1:19	0–24
2	2:09	Louisiana–Monroe	Harley Scioneaux 17 yard pass from Garrett Smith (Craig Ford kick), Drive: 3 plays, 71 yards, 0:58	0–31
2	1:37	Louisiana–Monroe	Chris Sciambra punt blocked by Caleb Tucker for a safety, Drive: 3 plays, 4 yards, 0:32	0–33
3	1:21	Louisiana–Monroe	Garrett Smith pass complete to Ajalen Holley 47 yard pass from Garrett Smith (Craig Ford kick), Drive: 1 play, 47 yards, 0:11	0–40
4	13:35	Louisiana–Monroe	Ben Luckett 12 yard run (Spencer Perkins kick), Drive: 9 plays, 51 yards, 3:11	0–47

=== @ Incarnate Word ===
Nicholls at Incarnate Word

Team	1	2	3	4	Total
Colonels	7	3	0	0	10
• Cardinals	0	7	3	10	20

- Date: September 19
- Location: Gayle and Tom Benson Stadium
  San Antonio, TX
- Game start: 2:00 PM CDT
- Elapsed time: 2:51
- Game attendance: 3,009
- Game weather: 90°F • Partly cloudy
- Referee: Ross Smith
- TV announcers (UIWtv): Chris Reyes & Anthony Gollab

Scoring summary
1	8:35	Nicholls	C.J. Bates 5 yard pass from Tuskani Figaro (Francisco Conado kick), Drive: 9 plays, 96 yards, 4:19	7–0
2	14:02	Incarnate Word	Cole Wick 12 yard pass from Trent Brittain (Cody Seidel kick), Drive: 9 plays, 84 yards, 4:12	7–7
2	9:16	Nicholls	Francisco Conado 42 yard field goal, Drive: 4 plays, 4 yards, 1:23	10–7
3	8:43	Incarnate Word	Ramon Coto 49 yard field goal, Drive: 4 plays, 1 yard, 0:44	10–10
4	13:13	Incarnate Word	Cody Seidel 25 yard field goal, Drive: 6 plays, 27 yards, 1:57	10–13
4	1:18	Incarnate Word	Trent Brittain 4 yard run (Cody Seidel kick), Drive: 8 plays, 68 yards, 3:13	10–20

=== @ Colorado ===
Nicholls at Colorado

Team	1	2	3	4	Total
Colonels	0	0	0	0	0
• Buffaloes	21	3	17	7	48

- Date: September 26
- Location: Folsom Field
  Boulder, CO
- Game start: 12:30 PM CDT
- Elapsed time: 3:06
- Game attendance: 37,302
- Game weather: 68°F • E 5 • Sunny, Humid 43%
- Referee: S. Strimling
- TV announcers: Kevin Calabro (play-by-play) and Yogi Roth (analyst)

Scoring summary
1	13:25	Colorado	Phillip Lindsay 4 yard run (Diego Gonzalez kick), Drive: 6 plays, 70 yards, 1:35	0–7
1	9:34	Colorado	Christian Powell 1 yard run (Diego Gonzalez kick), Drive: 8 plays, 50 yards, 1:53	0–14
1	4:55	Colorado	Jay MacIntyre 38 yard pass from Sefo Liufau (Diego Gonzalez kick), Drive: 8 plays, 55 yards, 3:01	0–21
2	2:21	Colorado	Diego Gonzalez 46 yard field goal, Drive: 4 plays, 26 yards, 1:41	0–24
3	7:15	Colorado	Phillip Lindsay 1 yard run (Diego Gonzalez kick), Drive: 6 plays, 58 yards, 1:49	0–31
3	4:22	Colorado	Donovan Lee 59 yard run (Diego Gonzalez kick), Drive: 4 plays, 74 yards, 1:15	0–38
3	0:57	Colorado	Diego Gonzalez 46 yard field goal, Drive: 4 plays, 4 yards, 1:33	0–41
4	4:46	Colorado	Kyle Evans 2 yard run (Chris Graham kick), Drive: 13 plays, 66 yards, 6:19	0–48

=== McNeese State ===
McNeese State at Nicholls

Team	1	2	3	4	Total
• #23 Cowboys	7	20	7	3	37
Colonels	0	7	0	0	7

- Date: October 3
- Location: John L. Guidry Stadium
  Thibodaux, LA
- Game start: 3:00 PM CDT
- Elapsed time: 3:03
- Game attendance: 6,192
- Game weather: 76°F • NNW 11 • Clear
- Referee: Kevin Hassell

Scoring summary
1	8:25	McNeese State	Tavarious Battiste 34 yard pass from Daniel Sams (Trent Manuel kick), Drive: 6 plays, 66 yards, 2:32	0–7
2	10:53	McNeese State	Ryan Ross 6 yard run (Trent Manuel kick missed), Drive: 11 plays, 53 yards, 5:22	0–13
2	1:51	McNeese State	Daniel Sams 4 yard run (Jean Breaux kick), Drive: 14 plays, 90 yards, 6:49	0–20
2	1:31	McNeese State	Kent Shelby 49 yard pass from David Bush (Jean Breaux kick), Drive: 1 play, 49 yards, 0:12	0–27
2	0:27	Nicholls	Damion Jeanpiere 52 yard from Tuskani Figaro (Francisco Condado kick), Drive: 5 plays, 70 yards, 1:04	7–27
3	6:13	McNeese State	Anthony Yruegas 0 yard fumble return (Jean Breaux kick), Drive: 2 plays, -20 yards, 0:25	7–34
4	7:03	McNeese State	Trent Manuel 36 yard field goal, Drive: 10 plays, 42 yards, 4:41	7–37

=== @ Stephen F. Austin ===
Nicholls at Stephen F. Austin

Team	1	2	3	4	Total
Colonels	14	7	0	3	24
• Lumberjacks	7	0	7	14	28

- Date: October 10
- Location: Homer Bryce Stadium
  Nacogdoches, TX
- Game start: 3:00 PM CDT
- Elapsed time: 3:06
- Game attendance: 5,523
- Game weather: Mid 80s • N 5 • Sunny
- Referee: Dan Lewis

Scoring summary
1	14:36	Nicholls	Tuskani Figaro 30 yard run (Francisco Condado kick), Drive: 2 plays, 75 yards, 0:24	7–0
1	6:35	Nicholls	Michael Henry 3 yard run (Francisco Condado kick), Drive: 8 plays, 77 yards, 3:08	14–0
1	0:44	Stephen F Austin	Justice Liggins 22 yard pass from Zach Conque (Mason Juhl kick), Drive: 4 plays, 44 yards, 1:56	14–7
2	10:04	Nicholls	Darryl Watson 8 yard pass from Tuskani Figaro (Francisco Condado kick), Drive: 12 plays, 85 yards, 5:36	21–7
3	8:16	Stephen F Austin	Loren Easly 3 yard run (Mason Juhl kick), Drive: 10 plays, 94 yards, 5:09	21–14
4	10:50	Nicholls	Francisco Condado 32 yard field goal, Drive: 8 plays, 65 yards, 4:07	24–14
4	9:14	Stephen F Austin	Zach Conque 18 yard run (Mason Juhl kick), Drive: 4 plays, 66 yards, 1:29	24–21
4	0:26	Stephen F Austin	Zach Conque 1 yard run (Mason Juhl kick), Drive: 13 plays, 84 yards, 6:09	24–28

=== Houston Baptist ===
Houston Baptist at Nicholls

Team	1	2	3	4	Total
Huskies	0	10	0	7	17
• Colonels	21	0	7	10	38

- Date: October 17
- Location: John L. Guidry Stadium
  Thibodaux, LA
- Game start: 3:00 PM CDT
- Elapsed time: 3:00
- Game attendance: 5,101
- Game weather: 76°F • NE 12 • Sunny
- Referee: Ross Smith

Scoring summary
1	8:36	Nicholls	Tuskani Figaro 3 yard run (Francisco Condado kick), 3 plays, 9 yards, 0:51	7–0
1	2:35	Nicholls	Michael Henry 1 yard run (Francisco Condado kick), 13 plays, 72 yards, 4:51	14–0
1	0:00	Nicholls	Michael Henry 1 yard run (Francisco Condado kick), 7 plays, 68 yards, 0:00	21–0
2	11:12	Houston Baptist	B.J. Kelly 1 yard run (Travis Shinn kick), 2 plays, 50 yards, 0:32	21–7
2	0:00	Houston Baptist	Travis Shinn 43 yard field goal, 12 plays, 63 yards, 3:36	21–10
3	12:32	Nicholls	Tobias Lofton 39 yard run (Francisco Condado kick), 6 plays, 65 yards, 2:28	28–10
4	9:01	Nicholls	Tuskani Figaro 14 yard run (Francisco Condado kick), 14 plays, 80 yards, 7:05	35–10
4	6:29	Nicholls	Francisco Condado 31 yard field goal, 4 plays, 3 yards, 2:05	38–10
4	4:38	Houston Baptist	B.J. Kelly 3 yard run (Travis Shinn kick), 6 plays, 69 yards, 1:44	38–17

=== @ Sam Houston State ===
Nicholls at Sam Houston State

Team	1	2	3	4	Total
Colonels	0	0	7	0	7
• #9 Bearkats	23	7	7	0	37

- Date: October 24
- Location: Bowers Stadium
  Huntsville, TX
- Game start: 6:00 PM CDT
- Elapsed time: 3:00
- Game attendance: 5,104
- TV announcers (FCS Central): Tom Franklin, Kenneth Moore, Maya Golden

Scoring summary
1	13:48	Sam Houston State	Team Safety, 4 plays, -25 yards, 1:06	0–2
1	11:49	Sam Houston State	Deon Hutchinson 13 yard pass from Jared Johnson (Tre Honshtein kick), 7 plays, 64 yards, 1:55	0–9
1	3:01	Sam Houston State	Hayden Cagle 3 yard pass from Jared Johnson (Tre Honshtein kick), 2 plays, 20 yards, 0:30	0–16
1	0:47	Sam Houston State	Corey Avery 12 yard run (Tre Honshtein kick), 4 plays, 29 yards, 1:19	0–23
2	1:05	Sam Houston State	Jalen Overstreet 12 yard run (Tre Honshtein kick), 1 play, 22 yards, 0:17	0–30
3	12:09	Sam Houston State	Ridgeway Frank 11 yard run (Tre Honshtein kick), 2 plays, 15 yards, 0:21	0–37
3	3:37	Nicholls	Tuskani Figaro 80 yard run (Francisco Condado kick), 2 plays, 80 yards, 0:18	7–37

=== Northwestern State ===
Northwestern State at Nicholls

Team	1	2	3	4	Total
• Demons	14	7	16	0	37
Colonels	7	7	7	0	21

- Date: October 31
- Location: John L. Guidry Stadium
  Thibodaux, LA
- Game start: 3:00 PM CDT
- Elapsed time: 3:05
- Game attendance: 5,066
- Game weather: 80 °F (27 °C) • S 12 • Rainy
- Referee: Kevin Mar

Scoring summary
1	9:25	Nicholls	Michael Henry 19 yard pass from Tuskani Figaro (Francisco Condado kick), Drive: 7 plays, 60 yards, 2:35	7–0
1	6:24	Northwestern State	De'Mard Llorens 1 yard run (Chris Moore kick), Drive: 7 plays, 56 yards, 2:55	7–7
1	3:10	Northwestern State	De'Mard Llorens 24 yard run (Chris Moore kick), Drive: 5 plays, 53 yards, 1:43	7–14
2	10:43	Northwestern State	De'Mard Llorens 13 yard run (Chris Moore kick), Drive: 12 plays, 88 yards, 4:58	7–21
2	1:49	Nicholls	Michael Henry 1 yard run (Francisco Condado kick), Drive: 11 plays, 74 yards, 4:40	14–21
3	11:33	Northwestern State	De'Mard Llorens 2 yard run (Chris Moore kick), Drive: 7 plays, 67 yards, 3:23	14–28
3	10:14	Northwestern State	JeMarcus Marshall Safety, Drive: 3 plays, -13 yards, 1:13	14–30
3	8:12	Northwestern State	Daniel Taylor 38 yard pass from Stephen Rivers (Chris Moore kick), Drive: 4 plays, 50 yards, 2:02	14–37
3	2:29	Nicholls	Tuskani Figaro 39 yard run (Francisco Condado kick), Drive: 5 plays, 80 yards, 1:54	21–37

=== @ Lamar ===
Nicholls at Lamar

Team	1	2	3	4	Total
• Colonels	7	7	13	3	30
Cardinals	14	7	7	0	28

- Date: November 7
- Location: Provost Umphrey Stadium
  Beaumont, TX
- Game start: 7:00 PM CST
- Elapsed time: 3:07
- Game attendance: 7,730
- Game weather: 64°F • NNE 15 • Rain and Windy
- Referee: Mike Vanderveld
- Television network: Live Streaming - Big Red Sports Network

Scoring summary
1	10:36	Lamar	Kade Harrington 9 yard run (Alex Ball kick), Drive: 11 plays, 90 yards, 4:24	0–7
1	9:33	Nicholls	Michael Henry 2 yard run (Francisco Condado kick), Drive: 4 plays, 82 yards, 0:59	7–7
1	7:52	Lamar	Kade Harrington 68 yard run (Alex Ball kick), Drive: 4 plays, 78 yards, 1:36	7–14
2	11:39	Lamar	Carson Earp 72 yard run (Alex Ball kick), Drive: 2 plays, 62 yards, 0:35	7–21
2	8:13	Nicholls	Tobias Lofton 82 yard run (Francisco Condado kick), Drive: 3 plays, 91 yards, 1:20	14–21
3	11:37	Nicholls	Michael Henry 9 yard run (Francisco Condado kick), Drive: 9 plays, 54 yards, 3:17	21–21
3	10:23	Lamar	Joe Minden 12 yard run (Alex Ball kick), Drive: 4 plays, 69 yards, 1:10	21–28
3	5:08	Nicholls	Landry Klann 5 yard run (Francisco Condado kick failed), Drive: 11 plays, 75 yards, 5:15	27–28
4	2:46	Nicholls	Francisco Condado 28 yard field goal, Drive: 9 plays, 56 yards, 4:15	30–28

=== Central Arkansas ===
Central Arkansas at Nicholls

Team	1	2	3	4	Total
• Bears	3	14	10	7	34
Colonels	0	10	7	14	31

- Date: November 14
- Location: John L. Guidry Stadium
  Thibodaux, LA
- Game start: 3:00 PM CST
- Elapsed time: 3:27
- Game attendance: 5,002
- Game weather: 60°F • NE 4 • Clear
- Referee: Dan Lewis
- Television network: SLDN

Scoring summary
1	0:11	Central Arkansas	Jace Denker 30 yard field goal, Drive: 10 plays, 60 yards, 3:43	0–3
2	10:32	Nicholls	C.J. Bates 15 yard pass from Landry Klann (Francisco Condado kick), Drive: 11 plays, 75 yards, 4:39	7–3
2	10:17	Central Arkansas	Jatavious Wilson 22 yard run (Jace Denker kick), Drive: 1 play, 22 yards, 0:08	7–10
2	4:05	Nicholls	Francisco Condado 23 yard field goal, Drive: 12 plays, 56 yards, 6:01	10–10
2	2:37	Central Arkansas	Justin Dickey 27 yard pass from Hayden Hildebrand (Jace Denker kick), Drive: 2 plays, 27 yards, 0:14	10–17
3	13:36	Nicholls	C.J. Bates 9 yard pass from Landry Klann (Francisco Condado kick), Drive: 3 plays, 9 yards, 0:42	17–17
3	8:49	Central Arkansas	Jace Denker 33 yard field goal, Drive: 11 plays, 62 yards, 4:41	17–20
3	7:39	Central Arkansas	Blake Veasley 6 yard run (Jace Denker kick), Drive: 1 play, 6 yards, 0:04	17–27
4	13:34	Central Arkansas	Blake Veasley 1 yard run (Jace Denker kick), Drive: 14 plays, 92 yards, 6:05	17–34
4	10:22	Nicholls	Terry Lucas 51 yard pass from Landry Klann (Francisco Condado kick), Drive: 1 play, 51 yards, 0:11	24–34
4	6:13	Nicholls	Stephe LeBouef 17 yard pass from Landry Klann (Francisco Condado kick), Drive: 7 plays, 65 yards, 2:30	31–34

=== @ Southeastern Louisiana ===
Nicholls at Southeastern Louisiana

Team	1	2	3	4	Total
• Colonels	0	3	14	10	27
Lions	7	10	0	7	24

- Date: November 21
- Location: Strawberry Stadium
  Hammond, LA
- Game start: 6:00 PM CST
- Elapsed time: 3:20
- Game attendance: 5,491
- Game weather: 64°F • Clear
- Referee: Ross Smith
- Television network: ASN

Scoring summary
1	9:31	Southeastern Louisiana	Micah Eugene 17 yard run (Jonathan Tatum kick), Drive: 5 plays, 52 yards, 2:13	0–7
2	9:31	Southeastern Louisiana	Jonathan Tatum 35 yard field goal, Drive: 12 plays, 49 yards, 4:43	0–10
2	9:31	Nicholls	Francisco Condado 45 yard field goal, Drive: 10 plays, 47 yards, 4:50	3–10
2	1:01	Southeastern Louisiana	Brandon Acker 28 yard pass from D'Shaie Landor (Jonathan Tatum kick), Drive: 5 plays, 52 yards, 1:37	3–17
3	13:14	Nicholls	Tobias Lofton 62 yard run (Francisco Condado kick), Drive: 4 plays, 75 yards, 1:46	10–17
3	9:06	Nicholls	Landry Klann 6 yard run (Francisco Condado kick), Drive: 8 plays, 61 yards, 3:06	17–17
4	14:51	Nicholls	Michael Henry 2 yard run (Francisco Condado kick), Drive: 10 plays, 91 yards, 4:20	24–17
4	0:59	Southeastern Louisiana	Brandon Acker 4 yard pass from D'Shaie Landor (Jonathan Tatum kick), Drive: 10 plays, 56 yards, 1:24	24–24
4	0:00	Nicholls	Francisco Condado 40 yard field goal, Drive:8 plays, 52 yards, 0:59	27–24
