= 2015 Sam Houston State Bearkats football team =

American college football season

2015 Sam Houston State Bearkats football

NCAA Division I Semifinal, L 10–62 at Jacksonville State
- Conference: Southland Conference

Ranking
- STATS: No. 3
- FCS Coaches: No. 4
- Record: 11–4 (7–2 Southland)
- Head coach: K. C. Keeler (2nd season)
- Offensive coordinator: Phil Longo (2nd season)
- Offensive scheme: Air raid
- Defensive coordinator: Mike Collins (3rd season)
- Co-defensive coordinator: Brad Sherrod (2nd season)
- Base defense: 3–4
- Home stadium: Bowers Stadium

2015 Southland Conference football standings
	Conf.			Overall
Team	W		L	W		L
No. 7 McNeese State $^	9	–	0	10	–	1
No. 3 Sam Houston State ^	7	–	2	11	–	4
Central Arkansas	7	–	2	7	–	4
Incarnate Word *	5	–	4	6	–	5
Lamar	4	–	5	5	–	6
Northwestern State	4	–	5	4	–	7
Stephen F. Austin	4	–	5	4	–	7
SE Louisiana	3	–	6	4	–	7
Abilene Christian *	3	–	6	3	–	8
Nicholls State	3	–	6	3	–	8
Houston Baptist	0	–	8	2	–	9
$ – Conference champion; ^ – FCS playoff participant; * – ineligible for FCS playoffs due to transition from NCAA Division II; Rankings from STATS poll

The 2015 Sam Houston State Bearkats football team represented Sam Houston State University in the 2015 NCAA Division I FCS football season. The Bearkats were led by second-year head coach K. C. Keeler and played their home games at Bowers Stadium. They were a member of the Southland Conference. They finished the season 11–4 overall and 7–2 in Southland play to finish in a tie for second place. They received an at-large bid to the FCS Playoffs where they defeated Southern Utah, McNeese State, and Colgate to advance to the Semifinals, where they lost to Jacksonville State. The 2015 season marked the Bearkats' 100th season of football.

== Schedule ==
Date	Time	Opponent	Rank	Site	TV	Result	Attendance
September 5	2:30 pm	at Texas Tech*	No. 3	Jones AT&T Stadium; Lubbock, TX	FSN	L 45–59	60,073
September 19	6:00 pm	Lamar	No. 3	Bowers Stadium; Huntsville, TX	ASN	L 46–49	10,116
September 26	6:00 pm	Houston Baptist	No. 12	Bowers Stadium; Huntsville, TX	FCS Central	W 63–14	9,014
October 3	3:00 pm	vs. Stephen F. Austin	No. 12	NRG Stadium; Houston, TX (Battle of the Piney Woods)	ESPN3	W 34–28	26,990
October 10	6:00 pm	Incarnate Word	No. 11	Bowers Stadium; Huntsville, TX	FCS Central	W 59–7	6,508
October 17	2:00 pm	at Abilene Christian	No. 9	Shotwell Stadium; Abilene, TX	ASN	W 49–21	8,763
October 24	6:00 pm	Nicholls State^{†}	No. 9	Bowers Stadium; Huntsville, TX	FCS Central	W 37–7	5,104
October 31	6:00 pm	No. 8 (D-II) Texas A&M–Commerce*	No. 8	Bowers Stadium; Huntsville, TX	FCS Pacific	W 38–24	4,862
November 7	6:00 pm	at No. 9 McNeese State	No. 7	Cowboy Stadium; Lake Charles, LA	ESPN3	L 10–27	10,501
November 14	2:30 pm	Northwestern State	No. 13	Bowers Stadium; Huntsville, TX	ESPN3	W 59–21	7,408
November 21	7:00 pm	at Central Arkansas	No. 10	Estes Stadium; Conway, AR		W 42–13	3,575
November 28	3:00 pm	No. 17 Southern Utah*	No. 6	Bowers Stadium; Huntsville, TX (NCAA Division I first round)	ESPN3	W 42–38	3,098
December 5	7:00 pm	at No. 3 McNeese State*	No. 6	Cowboy Stadium; Lake Charles, LA (NCAA Division I second round)	ESPN3	W 34–29	13,493
December 12	11:00 am	Colgate*	No. 6	Bowers Stadium; Huntsville, TX (NCAA Division I Quarterfinal)	ESPN3	W 48–21	5,074
December 19	3:00 pm	at No. 1 Jacksonville State*	No. 6	JSU Stadium; Jacksonville, AL (NCAA Division I Semifinal)	ESPNU	L 10–62	23,692
*Non-conference game; ^{†}Homecoming; Rankings from STATS Poll released prior to the game; All times are in Central time

== Game summaries ==
=== @ Texas Tech ===
Sam Houston State at Texas Tech

Team	1	2	3	4	Total
#3 Bearkats	14	17	0	14	45
• Red Raiders	14	28	17	0	59

- Date: September 5
- Location: Jones AT&T Stadium
  Lubbock, TX
- Game start: 2:30 PM CDT
- Elapsed time: 4:01
- Game attendance: 60,073
- Game weather: 89°F • Wind: SSW 12 • Partly Cloudy
- Referee: Brandon Cruse
- TV announcers (FSN): Mike Morgan, JC Pearson, Steffi Sorensen

Scoring summary
1	11:54	Texas Tech	Jakeem Grant 3 yard run (Michael Barden kick), Drive: 11 plays, 75 yards, 3:06	0–7
1	8:51	Sam Houston State	Ridgeway Frank 14 yard run (Luc Swimberghe kick), Drive: 11 plays, 93 yards, 3:03	7–7
1	3:54	Texas Tech	Devin Lauderdale 64 yard pass from Patrick Mahomes (Michael Barden kick), Drive: 2 plays, 59 yards, 0:13	7–14
1	0:53	Sam Houston State	Donavan Williams 1 yard run (Luc Swimberghe kick), Drive: 2 plays, 12 yards, 0:32	14–14
2	13:24	Texas Tech	Ian Sadler 8 yard pass from Patrick Mahomes (Michael Barden kick), Drive: 8 plays, 69 yards, 2:29	14–21
2	7:30	Sam Houston State	Luc Swimberghe 48 yard field goal, Drive: 6 plays, 47 yards, 2:16	17–21
2	7:13	Texas Tech	Jakeem Grant 94 yard punt return (Michael Barden kick), Drive: 0 plays, 0 yards, 0:00	17–28
2	3:44	Sam Houston State	Donavan Williams 2 yard run (Luc Swimberghe kick), Drive: 10 plays, 75 yards, 3:29	24–28
2	2:23	Texas Tech	Ian Sadler 53 yard pass from Patrick Mahomes (Michael Barden kick), Drive: 6 plays, 82 yards, 1:21	24–35
2	0:52	Sam Houston State	Davion Davis 29 yard pass from Jeremiah Briscoe (Luc Swimberghe kick), Drive: 8 plays, 75 yards, 1:31	31–35
2	0:14	Texas Tech	Devin Lauderdale 29 yard pass from Patrick Mahomes (Michael Barden kick), Drive: 4 plays, 67 yards, 0:38	31–42
3	14:14	Texas Tech	J.J. Gaines 47 yard interception return (Michael Barden kick), Drive: 3 plays, 12 yards, 0:46	31–49
3	9:59	Texas Tech	Michael Barden 27 yard field goal; Drive: 9 plays, 42 yards, 2:53	31–52
3	1:09	Texas Tech	Justin Stockton 4 yard run (Clayton Hatfield kick), Drive: 11 plays, 70 yards, 4:06	31–59
4	10:06	Sam Houston State	Donavan Williams 4 yard run (Luc Swimberghe kick), Drive: 6 plays, 47 yards, 2:14	38–59
4	1:53	Sam Houston State	Donavan Williams 1 yard run (Luc Swimberghe kick), Drive: 10 plays, 64 yards, 3:23	45–59

=== Lamar ===
Lamar at Sam Houston State

Team	1	2	3	4	Total
• Cardinals	14	21	0	14	49
#3 Bearkats	14	0	9	23	46

- Date: September 19
- Location: Bowers Stadium
  Huntsville, TX
- Game start: 6:00 PM CDT
- Elapsed time: 4:01
- Game attendance: 10,116
- TV announcers (ASN): Randy McIlvoy, Shea Walker, Chris Mycoskie

Scoring summary
1	9:20	Lamar	Reggi Begelton 4 yard pass from Carson Earp (Alex Ball kick), Drive: 11 plays, 56 yards, 4:53	0–7
1	7:50	Sam Houston State	Yedidiah Louis 46 yard pass from Jeremi Briscoe (Luc Swimberghe kick), Drive: 5 plays, 75 yards, 1:30	7–7
1	4:01	Lamar	Reggi Begelton 19 yard pass from Carson Earp (Alex Ball kick), Drive: 4 plays, 76 yards, 0:49	7–14
1	2:18	Sam Houston State	Donav Williams 8 yard pass from Jared Johnson (Luc Swimberghe kick), Drive: 7 plays, 75 yards, 1:43	14–14
2	12:40	Lamar	Kad Harrington 77 yard pass from Carson Earp (Alex Ball kick), Drive: 3 plays, 91 yards, 1:01	14–21
2	5:51	Lamar	Kad Harrington 5 yard run (Alex Ball kick), Drive: 6 plays, 89 yards, 2:45	14–28
2	1:29	Lamar	Devonn Brown 18 yard pass from Carson Earp (Alex Ball kick), Drive: 5 plays, 82 yards, 2:24	14–35
3	9:06	Sam Houston State	Luc Swimberghe 36 yard field goal, Drive: 10 plays, 43 yards, 4:38	17–35
3	1:08	Sam Houston State	Donav Williams 5 yard run (Jared Johnson two-point conv. failed), Drive: 13 plays, 59 yards, 4:12	23–35
4	14:55	Sam Houston State	Team Safety, Drive: 3 plays, -10 yards, 1:07	25–35
4	9:17	Lamar	Carl Harris 27 yard run (Alex Ball kick), Drive: 4 plays, 73 yards, 2:04	25–42
4	7:51	Sam Houston State	Gerald Thomas 55 yard pass from Jared Johnson (Luc Swimberghe kick), Drive: 5 plays, 75 yards, 1:26	32–42
4	4:59	Sam Houston State	Jared Johnson 16 yard run (Luc Swimberghe kick), Drive: 3 plays, 81 yards, 2:18	39–42
4	3:21	Lamar	Kad Harrington 73 yard run (Alex Ball kick), Drive: 3 plays, 80 yards, 1:27	39–49
4	0:58	Sam Houston State	Jared Johnson 6 yard run (Luc Swimberghe kick), Drive: 6 plays, 70 yards, 2:23	46–49

=== Houston Baptist ===
Houston Baptist at Sam Houston State

Team	1	2	3	4	Total
Huskies	7	7	0	0	14
• #12 Bearkats	14	14	28	7	63

- Date: September 26
- Location: Bowers Stadium
  Huntsville, TX
- Game start: 6:00 PM CDT
- Elapsed time: 3:01
- Game attendance: 9,014
- TV announcers (FCS Central): Randy McIlvoy, Jeff Power, Kara Gold

Scoring summary
1	11:36	Sam Houston State	Jared Johnson 86 yard pass complete to Gerald Thomas (Luc Swimberghe kick), Drive: 2 plays, 87 yards, 0:34	7–0
1	4:43	Houston Baptist	Tony Dawson 14 yard pass complete to Wesley Lewis (Christian Guzman kick), Drive: 11 plays, 70 yards, 6:48	7–7
1	2:55	Sam Houston State	Jared Johnson 7 yard run (Luc Swimberghe kick), Drive: 7 plays, 87 yards, 1:48	14–7
2	6:12	Houston Baptist	Terrance Peters 82 yard run (Christian Guzman kick), Drive: 3 plays, 90 yards, 1:52	14–14
2	4:12	Sam Houston State	LaDarius Brown 12 yard pass from Jeremiah Briscoe (Luc Swimberghe kick), Drive: 8 plays, 0 yards, 3:52	21–14
2	0:15	Sam Houston State	Gerald Thomas 38 yard pass from Jeremiah Briscoe (Carlos Teal kick), Drive: 5 plays, 83 yards, 1:53	28–14
3	11:49	Sam Houston State	Jared Johnson 2 yard pass complete to LaDarius Brown (Luc Swimberghe kick), Drive: 8 plays, 56 yards, 2:56	35–14
3	10:18	Sam Houston State	Gerald Thomas 25 yard interception return (Luc Swimberghe kick), Drive: 3 plays, -1 yard, 1:31	42–14
3	8:03	Sam Houston State	Jalen Overstreet 9 yard run (Luc Swimberghe kick), Drive: 5 plays, 32 yards, 1:20	49–14
3	0:57	Sam Houston State	Jared Johnson 10 yard run (Luc Swimberghe kick), Drive: 9 plays, 71 yards, 2:44	56–14
4	12:10	Sam Houston State	Stephen Williams 25 yard pass from Jeremiah Briscoe (Luc Swimberghe kick), Drive: 8 plays, 69 yards, 2:03	63–14

=== Stephen F. Austin ===
Battle of the Piney Woods

Team	1	2	3	4	Total
Lumberjacks	0	14	7	7	28
• #12 Bearkats	0	3	21	10	34

- Date: October 3
- Location: NRG Stadium
  Houston, TX
- Game start: 3:00 PM CDT
- Elapsed time: 3:32
- Game attendance: 26,990
- Game weather: 72°F • Wind: Calm • Indoors
- Referee: Ross Smith
- TV announcers (ESPN3): Randy McIlvoy, Shea Walker, Brooke Bentley

Scoring summary
2	14:54	Stephen F Austin	De'Quan 21-yard pass from Zach Conque (Mason Juhl kick), Drive: 6 plays, 61 yards, 2:04	0–7
2	5:40	Sam Houston State	Luc Swimberghe 35 yard field goal, Drive: 10 plays, 58 yards, 3:15	3–7
2	4:10	Stephen F Austin	Judah Jones 31 yard pass from Conque (Mason Juhl kick), Drive: 4 plays, 56 yards, 1:30	3–14
3	13:14	Sam Houston State	Gerald Thomas 78 yard punt return (Luc Swimberghe kick), Drive: 3 plays, 6 yards, 1:46	10–14
3	9:16	Sam Houston State	Donavan Williams 4 yard run (Luc Swimberghe kick), Drive: 10 plays, 70 yards, 2:27	17–14
3	5:41	Stephen F Austin	Conque 1 yard run (Mason Juhl kick), Drive: 10 plays, 79 yards, 3:35	17–21
3	3:01	Sam Houston State	Yedidiah Louis 53 yard punt return (Luc Swimberghe kick), Drive: 3 plays, 3 yards, 1:06	24–21
4	13:12	Sam Houston State	Corey Avery 1 yard run (Luc Swimberghe kick), Drive: 14 plays, 87 yards, 3:22	31–21
4	10:39	Stephen F Austin	Loren Easly 80 yard run (Mason Juhl kick), Drive: 1 play, 80 yards, 0:14	31–28
4	6:34	Sam Houston State	Luc Swimberghe 32 yard field goal, Drive: 10 plays, 56 yards, 4:05	34–28

The Sam Houston State Bearkats faced the Stephen F. Austin State Lumberjacks for the 90th time in the two teams history. The Bearkats led the all-time series 52–35–2 going into the game.

The first quarter featured several long drives by both teams but neither managed to get on the scoreboard, including a missed field goal by SHSU kicker Luc Swimberghe. However, the Lumberjacks worked their way down the field before the end of the quarter, culminating in a twenty one yard touchdown scoring pass by SFA quarterback Zach Conque to Lumberjack wide receiver De'Quann Ruffin in the opening seconds of the second quarter. With SFA kicker Mason Juhl's extra point, SFA led 7–0. After some more back and forth between the teams, Sam Houston eventually got on the board with a thirty five yard field goal by Swimberghe with 5:30 remaining in the quarter, narrowing SFA's lead to 7–3. SFA struck back quickly with a thirty one yard touchdown pass from Conque to wide receiver Judah Jones at the 4:10 mark, and with the extra point the teams went to half time with SFA leading 14–3.

On SHSU's first possession of the second half, Bearkats wide receiver Gerald Thomas returned a punt seventy eight yards for a score, and with Swimberge's extra point the Bearkats narrowed the gap to 14–10 at the 13:14 mark. On Sam Houston's next possession, the drive ended with 9:16 remaining in the quarter with a four-yard scoring run by SHSU running back Donovan Williams to but the Bearkats on top 17–14. SFA's next possession ended in a one-yard scoring rush by Conque to put SFA back on top 21–17. SHSU had another long punt return with wide receiver Yedidiah Louis bringing the ball in 53 yards for a score with 3:01 remaining in the quarter, and SHSU retook the lead 24–21. The third quarter ended with SHSU leading 24–21.

SHSU scored again early in the fourth quarter with a one-yard run by running back Corey Avery at the 13:12 mark, lifting the Bearkat lead to 31–21. The Bearkats failed to take advantage of a three-and-out by the Lumberjacks, with a forty seven yard punt return by Louis setting the Kats up in the red zone, but a field goal by Swimberge bounced off the upright. SFA struck back quickly with an eighty-yard scoring rush by Lumberjack running back Lon Easily on the first play of their possession, narrowing the lead to 31–28 Bearkats. Another Bearkat field goal by Swimberge stretched the lead to 34–28, where it stayed through the end of the game.

=== Incarnate Word ===
Incarnate Word at Sam Houston State

Team	1	2	3	4	Total
Cardinals	0	0	7	0	7
• #11 Bearkats	24	28	7	0	59

- Date: October 10
- Location: Bowers Stadium
  Huntsville, TX
- Game start: 6:00 PM CDT
- Elapsed time: 3:10
- Game attendance: 6,508
- Referee: Kevin Hassell
- TV announcers (FCS Central): Tom Franklin, Kenneth Moore, Kara Gold

Scoring summary
1	10:55	Sam Houston State	Luc Swimberghe 34 yard field goal, Drive: 11 plays, 63 yards, 2:49	3–0
1	8:13	Sam Houston State	Jared Johnson 66 yard pass complete to Corey Avery (Luc Swimberghe kick), Drive: 3 plays, 76 yards, 1:08	10–0
1	6:53	Sam Houston State	Jared Johnson 35 yard pass complete to LaDarius Brown (Luc Swimberghe kick), Drive: 3 plays, 34 yards, 1:06	17–0
1	6:28	Sam Houston State	Donavan Williams 1 yard run (Luc Swimberghe kick), Drive: 1 play, 1 yard, 0:03	24–0
2	12:53	Sam Houston State	Jalen Overstreet 3 yard run (Luc Swimberghe kick), Drive: 7 plays, 30 yards, 2:24	31–0
2	11:51	Sam Houston State	Collins Okotcha 60 yard interception return (Luc Swimberghe kick), Drive: 3 plays, 53 yards, 0:57	38–0
2	8:05	Sam Houston State	Jeremiah Briscoe 35 yard pass complete to LaDarius Brown (Luc Swimberghe kick); Drive: 7 plays, 94 yards, 1:42	45–0
2	2:05	Sam Houston State	Corey Avery 8 yard run (Luc Swimberghe kick), Drive: 12 plays, 93 yards, 4:38	52–0
3	9:02	Incarnate Word	Dorland Fields 1 yard run (Cody Seidel kick), Drive: 14 plays, 65 yards, 5:52	52–7
3	1:36	Sam Houston State	Remus Bulmer 8 yard run (Luc Swimberghe kick), Drive: 9 plays, 75 yards, 3:04	59–7

=== @ Abilene Christian ===
Sam Houston State at Abilene Christian

Team	1	2	3	4	Total
• #9 Bearkats	28	7	14	0	49
Wildcats	0	7	0	14	21

- Date: October 17
- Location: Shotwell Stadium
  Abilene, TX
- Game start: 2:00 PM CDT
- Elapsed time: 3:13
- Game attendance: 8,763
- Game weather: 79°F • SSE 7 • Sunny
- Referee: Kevin Mar

Scoring summary
1	13:41	Sam Houston State	LaDarius Brown 64 yard pass from Jared Johnson (Luc Swimberghe kick), Drive: 4 plays, 75 yards, 1:19	7–0
1	8:07	Sam Houston State	Corey Avery 9 yard pass from Jared Johnson (Luc Swimberghe kick), Drive: 6 plays, 51 yards, 1:49	14–0
1	3:53	Sam Houston State	Collin Rison 24 yard pass from Jared Johnson (Luc Swimberghe kick), Drive: 6 plays, 81 yards, 1:26	21–0
1	0:22	Sam Houston State	Don King III 9 yard run (Luc Swimberghe kick), Drive: 5 plays, 37 yards, 1:07	28–0
2	9:44	Abilene Christian	Dallas Sealey 8 yard run (Zach Lehr kick), Drive: 11 plays, 80 yards, 5:30	28–7
2	1:19	Sam Houston State	Corey Avery 1 yard run (Luc Swimberghe kick), Drive: 5 plays, 80 yards, 2:04	35–7
3	9:24	Sam Houston State	Corey Avery 10 yard pass from Jared Johnson (Luc Swimberghe kick), Drive: 9 plays, 61 yards, 3:27	42–7
3	3:01	Sam Houston State	Davion Davis 13 yard pass from Jared Johnson (Luc Swimberghe kick), Drive: 8 plays, 68 yards, 2:16	49–7
4	12:47	Abilene Christian	Adrian Duncan 14 yard run (Zach Lehr kick), Drive: 12 plays, 78 yards, 5:08	49–14
4	4:45	Abilene Christian	Jamie Walker 7 yard pass from Cody Ennis (Zach Lehr kick), Drive: 6 plays, 86 yards, 2:57	49–21

=== Nicholls (homecoming) ===
Nicholls at Sam Houston State

Team	1	2	3	4	Total
Colonels	0	0	7	0	7
• #9 Bearkats	23	7	7	0	37

- Date: October 24
- Location: Bowers Stadium
  Huntsville, TX
- Game start: 6:00 PM CDT
- Elapsed time: 3:00
- Game attendance: 5,104
- TV announcers (FCS Central): Tom Franklin, Kenneth Moore, Maya Golden

Scoring summary
1	13:48	Sam Houston State	Team Safety, Drive: 4 plays, -25 yards, 1:06	2–0
1	11:49	Sam Houston State	Deon Hutchinson 13 yard pass from Jared Johnson (Tre Honshtein kick), Drive: 7 plays, 64 yards, 1:55	9–0
1	3:01	Sam Houston State	Hayden Cagle 3 yard pass from Jared Johnson (Tre Honshtein kick), Drive: 2 plays, 20 yards, 0:30	16–0
1	0:47	Sam Houston State	Corey Avery 12 yard run (Tre Honshtein kick), Drive: 4 plays, 29 yards, 1:19	23–0
2	1:05	Sam Houston State	Jalen Overstreet 12 yard run (Tre Honshtein kick), Drive: 1 play, 22 yards, 0:17	30–0
3	12:09	Sam Houston State	Ridgeway Frank 11 yard run (Tre Honshtein kick), Drive: 2 plays, 15 yards, 0:21	37–0
3	3:37	Nicholls	Tuskani Figaro 80 yard run (Francisco Condado kick), Drive: 2 plays, 80 yards, 0:18	37–7

=== Texas A&M–Commerce ===
Texas A&M–Commerce at Sam Houston State

Team	1	2	3	4	Total
Lions	3	7	14	0	24
• #8 Bearkats	14	10	7	7	38

- Date: October 31
- Location: Bowers Stadium
  Huntsville, TX
- Game start: 6:04 PM CDT
- Elapsed time: 3:11
- Game attendance: 4,862
- Referee: Dan Lewis
- TV announcers (FCS Pacific): Tom Franklin, Kennth Moore, Maya Gold

Scoring summary
1	12:07	Sam Houston State	Cory Avery 3 yard run (Tre Honshtein kick), Drive: 12 plays, 84 yards, 2:53	7–0
1	10:12	Texas A&M–Commerce	Kristov Martinez 31 yard field goal, Drive: 7 plays, 41 yards, 1:48	7–3
1	4:28	Sam Houston State	Cory Avery 4 yard run (Tre Honshtein kick), Drive: 5 plays, 80 yards, 1:53	14–3
2	13:11	Sam Houston State	Jalen Overstreet 2 yard run (Tre Honshtein kick), Drive: 12 plays, 45 yards, 3:00	21–3
2	9:45	Texas A&M–Commerce	Darby Smith 55 yard pass from Harrison Stewart (Kristov Martinez kick), Drive: 1 play, 55 yards, 0:09	21–10
2	0:00	Sam Houston State	Tre Honshtein 22 yard field goal, Drive: 13 plays, 83 yards, 4:21	24–10
3	10:10	Texas A&M–Commerce	Derrick Macon 10 yard pass from Harrison Stewart (Kristov Martinez kick), Drive: 3 plays, 88 yards, 1:08	24–17
3	5:07	Texas A&M–Commerce	Lance Evans 39 yard pass from Harrison Stewart (Kristov Martinez kick), Drive: 8 plays, 94 yards, 2:26	24–24
3	2:14	Sam Houston State	Cory Avery 1 yard run (Tre Honshtein kick), Drive: 9 plays, 44 yards, 2:53	31–24
4	9:19	Sam Houston State	Jared Johnson 24 yard run (Tre Honshtein kick), Drive: 4 plays, 64 yards, 1:37	38–24

=== @ McNeese State ===
Sam Houston State at McNeese State

Team	1	2	3	4	Total
#7 Bearkats	10	0	0	0	10
• #9 Cowboys	0	14	3	10	27

- Date: November 7
- Location: Cowboy Stadium
  Lake Charles, LA
- Game start: 7:00 PM CST
- Elapsed time: 2:58
- Game attendance: 10,501
- Game weather: 64°F • NNE 13 • Overcast with rain
- Referee: Dan Romeo
- Television network: ESPN3

Scoring summary
1	9:38	Sam Houston State	Darion Flowers 90 yard interception return (Tre Honshtein kick), Drive: 11 plays, 67 yards, 5:22	7–0
1	0:54	Sam Houston State	Tre Honshtein 20 yard field goal, Drive: 7 plays, 95 yards, 2:06	10–0
2	1:40	McNeese State	Daniel Sams 64 yard run (Jean Breaux kick), Drive: 2 plays, 64 yards, 0:37	10–7
2	0:04	McNeese State	Kent Shelby 6 yard pass from Daniel Sams (Jean Breaux kick), Drive: 8 plays, 70 yards, 1:06	10–14
3	3:48	McNeese State	Jean Breaux 23 yard field goal, Drive: 11 plays, 81 yards, 4:53	10–17
4	5:20	McNeese State	Jean Breaux 27 yard field goal, Drive: 10 plays, 59 yards, 5:09	10–20
4	5:11	McNeese State	Ryan Ross 20 yard run (Jean Breaux kick), Drive: 1 play, 20 yards, 0:09	10–27

=== Northwestern State ===
Northwestern State at Sam Houston State

Team	1	2	3	4	Total
Demons	7	7	7	0	21
• #13 Bearkats	14	21	10	14	59

- Date: November 14
- Location: Bowers Stadium
  Huntsville, TX
- Game start: 2:30 PM CST
- Elapsed time: 3:03
- Game attendance: 7,408
- Referee: Carl McNeil

Scoring summary
1	13:29	Sam Houston State	Yedidiah Louis 24 yard pass from Jared Johnson (Tre Honshtein kick), Drive: 7 plays, 75 yards, 1:31	7–0
1	3:51	Northwestern State	Chris Jones 19 yard run (Chris Moore kick), Drive: 8 plays, 61 yards, 3:04	7–7
1	1:10	Sam Houston State	Yedidiah Louis 24 yard pass from Jared Johnson (Tre Honshtein kick), Drive: 7 plays, 65 yards, 2:32	14–7
2	11:42	Sam Houston State	Corey Avery 27 yard run (Tre Honshtein kick), Drive: 7 plays, 71 yards, 2:32	21–7
2	7:06	Sam Houston State	Yedidiah Louis 9 yard run (Tre Honshtein kick), Drive: 11 plays, 77 yards, 2:59	28–7
2	5:27	Sam Houston State	Gerald Thomas 15 yard pass from Jared Johnson (Tre Honshtein kick), Drive: 3 plays, 20 yards, 0:56	35–7
2	2:03	Northwestern State	Ed Eagan 22 yard pass from Stephen Rivers (Chris Moore kick), Drive: 8 plays, 60 yards, 3:22	35–14
3	12:01	Northwestern State	De'Mard Llorens 15 yard run (Chris Moore kick), Drive: 6 plays, 80 yards, 2:53	35–21
3	9:52	Sam Houston State	Jalen Overstreet 8 yard run (Tre Honshtein kick), Drive: 8 plays, 65 yards, 2:09	42–21
3	5:23	Sam Houston State	Tre Honshtein 31 yard field goal, Drive: 7 plays, 49 yards, 1:51	45–21
4	12:54	Sam Houston State	Corey Avery 78 yard run (Tre Honshtein kick), Drive: 3 plays, 88 yards, 1:10	52–21
4	2:23	Sam Houston State	Ridgeway Frank 11 yard run (Tre Honshtein kick), Drive: 12 plays, 87 yards, 5:20	59–21

=== @ Central Arkansas ===
Sam Houston State at Central Arkansas

Team	1	2	3	4	Total
• #10 Bearkats	14	21	7	0	42
Bears	6	0	7	0	13

- Date: November 21
- Location: Estes Stadium
  Conway, AR
- Game start: 7:00 PM CST
- Elapsed time: 3:21
- Game attendance: 3,575
- Referee: D. Alvarez

Scoring summary
1	12:20	Central Arkansas	Jace Denker 45 yard field goal, Drive: 5 plays, 38 yards, 1:22	0–3
1	11:01	Sam Houston State	Jalen Overstreet 13 yard run (Tre Honshtein kick), Drive: 6 plays, 80 yards, 1:11	7–3
1	6:49	Central Arkansas	Jace Denker 35 yard field goal, Drive: 11 plays, 54 yards, 4:05	7–6
1	2:39	Sam Houston State	Corey Avery 45 yard run (Tre Honshtein kick), Drive: 1 play, 45 yards, 0:07	14–6
2	10:09	Sam Houston State	Corey Avery 3 yard run (Tre Honshtein kick), Drive: 4 plays, 39 yards, 1:10	21–6
2	1:37	Sam Houston State	Gerald Thomas 50 yard pass from Jared Johnson (Tre Honshtein kick), Drive: 3 plays, 53 yards, 0:41	28–6
2	0:21	Sam Houston State	LaDarius Brown 3 yard pass from Jared Johnson (Tre Honshtein kick), Drive: 3 plays, 62 yards, 0:21	35–6
3	11:42	Sam Houston State	Jalen Overstreet 30 yard run (Tre Honshtein kick), Drive: 6 plays, 55 yards, 1:57	42–6
3	2:00	Central Arkansas	Jatavious Wilson 28 yard pass from Hayden Hildebrand (Jace Denker kick), Drive: 4 plays, 65 yards, 1:14	42–13

== FCS playoffs ==
=== First round – Southern Utah ===
Southern Utah at Sam Houston State

Team	1	2	3	4	Total
#17 Thunderbirds	6	26	7	0	39
• #6 Bearkats	16	10	7	9	42

- Date: November 28
- Location: Bowers Stadium
  Huntsville, TX
- Game start: 3:00 PM CST
- Elapsed time: 3:50
- Game attendance: 3,098

Scoring summary
1	13:01	Sam Houston State	Corey Avery 3 yard run (Tre Honshtein kick), Drive: 4 plays, 40 yards, 1:00	7–0
1	12:21	Southern Utah	Brady Measom 69 yard pass from Ammon Olsen (Keita Calhoun kick blocked), Drive: 2 plays, 75 yards, 0:34	7–6
1	12:21	Sam Houston State	Alfonzo McMillian Defensive PAT Conversion, Drive: 2 plays, 75 yards, 0:34	9–6
1	9:44	Sam Houston State	Corey Avery 31 yard run (Tre Honshtein kick), Drive: 1 play, 31 yards, 0:09	16–6
2	14:02	Sam Houston State	Tre Honshtein 29 yard field goal, Drive: 14 plays, 46 yards, 3:10	19–6
2	12:04	Southern Utah	Malik Brown 4 yard run (two-point conv. failed), Drive: 8 plays, 73 yards, 1:53	19–12
2	8:06	Sam Houston State	Ridgeway Frank 2 yard run (Tre Honshtein kick), Drive: 11 plays, 75 yards, 3:58	26–12
2	7:47	Southern Utah	Ty Rutledge 61 yard run (Keita Calhoun kick), Drive: 1 play, 61 yards, 0:12	26–19
2	4:11	Southern Utah	Mike Sharp 36 yard pass from Ammon Olsen (Keita Calhoun kick), Drive: 7 plays, 52 yards, 2:52	26–26
2	2:08	Southern Utah	Mike Sharp 34 yard pass from Ammon Olsen (Keita Calhoun kick blocked), Drive: 4 plays, 72 yards, 0:41	26–32
3	12:58	Southern Utah	Mike Sharp 9 yard pass from Ammon Olsen (Keita Calhoun kick), Drive: 5 plays, 26 yards, 0:40	26–39
3	7:00	Sam Houston State	Ridgeway Frank 1 yard run (Tre Honshtein kick), Drive: 8 plays, 48 yards, 2:05	33–39
4	8:36	Sam Houston State	Team Safety, Drive: 2 plays, -6 yards, 0:44	35–39
4	3:44	Sam Houston State	Yedidiah Louis 55 yard pass from Jeremiah Briscoe (Tre Honshtein kick), Drive: 1 play, 55 yards, 0:14	42–39

=== Second round – McNeese State ===
Sam Houston State at McNeese State

Team	1	2	3	4	Total
• #6 Bearkats	7	17	10	0	34
#3 Cowboys	10	7	6	6	29

- Date: December 5
- Location: Cowboy Stadium
  Lake Charles, LA
- Game start: 7:00 PM CST
- Elapsed time: 3:33
- Game attendance: 13,493
- Game weather: 57°F • ENE 3 • Fair, 45% humidity
- Referee: Jeremy Parker
- Television network: ESPN3

Scoring summary
1	11:58	McNeese State	Jean Breaux 43 yard field goal Drive: 4 plays, 4 yards, 1:23	0–3
1	4:08	Sam Houston State	LaDarius Brown 54 yard pass from Jeremiah Briscoe (Tre Honshtein kick) Drive: 4 plays, 70 yards, 1:04	7–3
1	0:39	McNeese State	Kent Shelby 15 yard pass from Daniel Sams (Jean Breaux kick) Drive: 8 plays, 67 yards, 3:29	7–10
2	13:32	McNeese State	David Bush 4 yard pass from Daniel Sams (Jean Breaux kick) Drive: 5 plays, 27 yards, 1:34	7–17
2	9:38	Sam Houston State	Corey Avery 1 yard run (Tre Honshtein kick) Drive: 9 plays, 42 yards, 3:54	14–17
2	4:30	Sam Houston State	Yedidiah Louis 22 yard pass from Jeremiah Briscoe (Tre Honshtein kick) Drive: 10 plays, 86 yards, 3:11	21–17
2	0:00	Sam Houston State	Tre Honshtein 47 yard field goal Drive: 12 plays, 51 yards, 1:58	24–17
3	9:01	Sam Houston State	Tre Honshtein 24 yard field goal Drive: 10 plays, 60 yards, 3:31	27–17
3	2:22	McNeese State	Zach Hetrick 3 yard pass from Daniel Sams (Jean Breaux kick blocked) Drive: 8 plays, 66 yards, 3:58	27–23
3	1:21	Sam Houston State	Yedidiah Louis 28 yard pass from Jeremiah Briscoe (Tre Honshtein kick) Drive: 5 plays, 50 yards, 1:01	34–23
4	11:20	McNeese State	Tavarious Battiste 43 yard pass from Daniel Sams (two-point conv. failed) Drive: 7 plays, 51 yards, 3:33	34–29

=== Quarterfinals–Colgate ===
Colgate at Sam Houston State

Team	1	2	3	4	Total
Raiders	0	14	0	7	21
• #6 Bearkats	14	17	10	7	48

- Date: December 12
- Location: Bowers Stadium
  Huntsville, TX
- Game start: 11:00 AM CST
- Elapsed time: 3:01
- Game attendance: 5,074
- Television network: ESPN3

Scoring summary
1	12:01	Sam Houston State	Corey Avery 1 yard run (Tre Honshtein kick), Drive: 9 plays, 75 yards, 2:59	7–0
1	7:59	Sam Houston State	Davion Davis 26 yard pass from Jeremiah Briscoe (Tre Honshtein kick), Drive: 11 plays, 81 yards, 2:36	14–0
2	14:58	Colgate	James Holland 3 yard run (Jonah Bowman kick), Drive: 16 plays, 80 yards, 7:55	14–7
2	8:51	Sam Houston State	Yedidiah Louis 8 yard pass from Jeremiah Briscoe (Tre Honshtein kick), Drive: 10 plays, 69 yards, 2:47	21–7
2	5:57	Sam Houston State	LaDarius Brown 18 yard pass from Jeremiah Briscoe (Tre Honshtein kick), Drive: 5 plays, 47 yards, 1:13	28–7
2	0:48	Colgate	Alex Greenawalt 31 yard pass from Jake Melville (Jonah Bowman kick), Drive: 10 plays, 75 yards, 5:09	28–14
2	0:00	Sam Houston State	Tre Honshtein 23 yard field goal, Drive: 7 plays, 58 yards, 0:40	31–14
3	11:01	Sam Houston State	Tre Honshtein 21 yard field goal, Drive: 7 plays, 55 yards, 2:23	34–14
3	7:20	Sam Houston State	Gerald Thomas 32 yard pass from Jeremiah Briscoe (Tre Honshtein kick), Drive: 8 plays, 77 yards, 2:15	41–14
4	11:57	Sam Houston State	LaDarius Brown 25 yard pass from Jalen Overstreet (Tre Honshtein kick), Drive: 9 plays, 93 yards, 2:12	48–14
4	4:08	Colgate	Jake Melville 13 yard run (Jonah Bowman kick), Drive: 9 plays, 80 yards, 3:42	48–21

=== Semifinals–Jacksonville State ===
Sam Houston State at Jacksonville State

Team	1	2	3	4	Total
#6 Bearkats	0	10	0	0	10
• #1 Gamecocks	17	24	14	7	62

- Date: December 19
- Location: JSU Stadium
  Jacksonville, AL
- Game start: 3:00 PM CST
- Elapsed time: 3:26
- Game attendance: 23,692
- Game weather: 52°F • WNW 5 • Sunny
- Referee: Tom Stapleton
- Television network: ESPNU

Scoring summary
1	13:25	Jacksonville State	Eli Jenkins 1 yard run (Connor Rouleau kick), Drive: 4 plays, 31 yards, 1:35	0–7
1	9:42	Jacksonville State	Troymaine Pope 62 yard run (Connor Rouleau kick), Drive: 5 plays, 85 yards, 1:40	0–14
1	6:51	Jacksonville State	Connor Rouleau 36 yard field goal, Drive: 4 plays, 8 yards, 1:52	0–17
2	13:43	Jacksonville State	Miles Jones 3 yard run (Connor Rouleau kick), Drive: 8 plays, 37 yards, 3:36	0–24
2	7:46	Jacksonville State	Ruben Gonzalez 12 yard pass from Eli Jenkins (Connor Rouleau kick), Drive: 14 plays, 89 yards, 5:00	0–31
2	5:37	Sam Houston State	LaDarius Brown 0 yard run (Tre Honshtein kick), Drive: 7 plays, 61 yards, 2:09	7–31
2	1:24	Jacksonville State	Connor Rouleau 22 yard field goal, Drive: 12 plays, 67 yards, 4:13	7–34
2	0:59	Jacksonville State	Troymaine Pope 7 yard run (Connor Rouleau kick), Drive: 1 play, 7 yards, 0:05	7–41
2	0:08	Sam Houston State	Tre Honshtein 51 yard field goal, Drive: 7 plays, 23 yards, 0:51	10–41
3	11:34	Jacksonville State	Ruben Gonzalez 8 yard pass from Eli Jenkins (Connor Rouleau kick), Drive: 6 plays, 84 yards, 2:41	10–48
3	4:56	Jacksonville State	Miles Jones 3 yard run (Connor Rouleau kick), Drive: 9 plays, 87 yards, 4:20	10–55
4	9:29	Jacksonville State	Christian LeMay 13 yard run (Cade Stinnett kick), Drive: 5 plays, 63 yards, 2:17	10–62

== Ranking movements ==
Ranking movements Legend: ██ Increase in ranking ██ Decrease in ranking т = Tied with team above or below ( ) = First-place votes
	Week													
Poll	Pre	1	2	3	4	5	6	7	8	9	10	11	12	Final
STATS FCS	3	1 (31)	3 (38)	12	12	11	9	9	8	7	13	10	6	3
Coaches	4	4 (2)	5	14	14	14	11	10	10	9–T	18	12	10	4
