= 2015 Incarnate Word Cardinals football team =

American college football season

2015 Incarnate Word Cardinals football
- Conference: Southland Conference
- Record: 6–5 (5–4 Southland)
- Head coach: Larry Kennan (4th season)
- Offensive coordinator: Tony Marciano (6th season)
- Offensive scheme: Multiple
- Defensive coordinator: Brian Gamble (4th season)
- Base defense: 3–4
- Home stadium: Gayle and Tom Benson Stadium

2015 Southland Conference football standings
	Conf.			Overall
Team	W		L	W		L
No. 7 McNeese State $^	9	–	0	10	–	1
No. 3 Sam Houston State ^	7	–	2	11	–	4
Central Arkansas	7	–	2	7	–	4
Incarnate Word *	5	–	4	6	–	5
Lamar	4	–	5	5	–	6
Northwestern State	4	–	5	4	–	7
Stephen F. Austin	4	–	5	4	–	7
SE Louisiana	3	–	6	4	–	7
Abilene Christian *	3	–	6	3	–	8
Nicholls State	3	–	6	3	–	8
Houston Baptist	0	–	8	2	–	9
$ – Conference champion; ^ – FCS playoff participant; * – ineligible for FCS playoffs due to transition from NCAA Division II; Rankings from STATS poll

The 2015 Incarnate Word Cardinals football team represented the University of the Incarnate Word in the 2015 NCAA Division I FCS football season. The Cardinals were in their third transition season of collegiate football at the FCS level. They were led by fourth-year head coach Larry Kennan. This was the Cardinals second season with a full Southland Conference schedule since becoming members of the conference. They played their home games at Gayle and Tom Benson Stadium. They finished the season 6–5, 5–4 in Southland play to finish in fourth place.

== TV and radio ==
All Incarnate Word games will be broadcast on CBS Sports Radio 860 AM with the voices of Gabe Farias and Shawn Morris. CBS Sports Radio 860 AM broadcasts will be available at their CBS Sports Radio 860 AM. KUIW Radio will also produce a student media broadcast every week, that will be available online, and they will provide streaming of all non-televised home games via UIWtv.

== Schedule ==
Date	Time	Opponent	Site	TV	Result	Attendance
September 5	2:00 pm	Texas A&M–Kingsville*	Gayle and Tom Benson Stadium; San Antonio, TX	UIWtv	W 18–16	5,229
September 12	6:00 pm	at McNeese State	Cowboy Stadium; Lake Charles, LA	ASN	L 6–43	12,804
September 19	2:00 pm	Nicholls	Gayle and Tom Benson Stadium; San Antonio, TX	UIWtv	W 20–10	3,009
September 26	7:00 pm	at UTEP*	Sun Bowl Stadium; El Paso, TX	C-USA Digital	L 17–27	22,322
October 3	2:00 pm	Northwestern State	Gayle and Tom Benson Stadium; San Antonio, TX	UIWtv	W 45–31	3,012
October 10	6:00 pm	at No. 11 Sam Houston State	Bowers Stadium; Huntsville, TX	FCS	L 7–59	6,508
October 25	2:00 pm	Abilene Christian^{†}	Gayle and Tom Benson Stadium; San Antonio, TX	ASN	W 25–20	3,175
October 31	3:00 pm	at Stephen F. Austin	Homer Bryce Stadium; Nacogdoches, TX	ESPN3	L 21–55	4,814
November 7	7:00 pm	at Southeastern Louisiana	Strawberry Stadium; Hammond, LA	ESPN3	W 16–2	3,474
November 14	2:00 pm	Lamar	Gayle and Tom Benson Stadium; San Antonio, TX	UIWtv	L 21–28	4,402
November 21	2:00 pm	at Houston Baptist	Husky Stadium; Houston, TX		W 30–3	2,251
*Non-conference game; ^{†}Homecoming; Rankings from STATS FCS Poll released prior to game Poll released prior to the game; All times are in Central time

== Personnel ==
=== Coaching staff ===
Name	Position	Alma mater	Joined staff
Larry Kennan	Head coach	La Verne	2012
Todd Ivicic	Associate head coach / Defensive Line / special teams coordinator	Sam Houston State	2008
Tony Marciano	Assistant Head Coach / offensive coordinator / Offensive Line	IUP	2010
Brian Gamble	Defensive coordinator / Inside Linebackers	Texas A&M	2008
Kyle Kennan	Passing Game coordinator / wide receivers	Roger Williams	2008
Nick Debose	Defensive Backs / video coordinator	Southeastern Oklahoma	2008
Larry Moore	Running Backs / academic coordinator	BYU	2011
Sean Davis	Quarterbacks / recruiting coordinator / Compliance Liaison	Azusa Pacific	2013
Robert Lyles	Outside Linebackers / Housing Liaison	TCU	2015
Mike Barela	Tight Ends / travel coordinator	North Texas	2015
Alan Ford	Nickel Backs	Incarnate Word	2014
Darin Lovat	Strength and Conditioning Coach	UNLV	2012
T.R. St. Charles	Head Football Athletic Trainer	Vanderbilt	2008

=== Roster ===
2015 Incarnate Word Cardinals Football
Quarterback: 3 Taylor Woods – senior (6'3, 205); 4 Trent Brittain – (redshirt) sophomore (6'2, 205); 5 Breylann McCollum – (redshirt) sophomore (6'2, 210); 8 McLane Carter – freshman (6'3, 195); 17 Jordan Scelfo – (redshirt) senior (5'10, 190); Running back: 7 Dorland Fields – (redshirt) freshman (5'9, 200); 20 Keshon Leonard – (redshirt) sophomore (5'7, 170); 24 Sean Flannel – (redshirt) junior (5'10, 190); 25 Broderick Reeves – junior (5'9, 195); 26 Junior Sessions – junior (5'10, 215); Wide receiver: 2 Jordan Hicks – junior (5'8, 170); 6 Lamont Johnson – freshman (6'0, 170); 11 Clint Killough – (redshirt) senior (5'10, 180); 16 Daryl Brooks – junior (6'4, 195); 21 Stefon Martin – (redshirt) junior (6'2, 195); 22 Jamari Gilbert – (redshirt) sophomore (6'2, 185); 80 Kaleb Hardy – (redshirt) sophomore (6'4, 215); 81 Kody Edwards – junior (6'0, 165); 82 Taylor Hudson – (redshirt) senior (6'1, 190); 84 Trevor Smith – senior (5'7, 175); 85 Anthony Marciano – (redshirt) freshman (5'11, 185); 86 Gabriel Taylor – (redshirt) senior (6'7, 215); 87 Dillon Manz – freshman (6'2, 205); Tight end: 40 Luis Lopez – freshman (6'4, 265); 45 Cole Wick – senior (6'7, 255); 47 Josh Esukpa – (redshirt) junior (6'1, 245); 83 Thaddeus Greene – junior (6'4, 215); 89 John Myers – freshman (6'6, 240)	H-Back: 29 John Oglesby – junior (6'1, 220); 44 Cyril Clarke – (redshirt) junior (6'1, 220); 46 Jamaal Ojo – (redshirt) junior (6'0, 225); Offensive line: 53 Matt McCarthy – C – (redshirt) junior (6'3, 285); 57 Devyn Jensen – OG – sophomore (6'3, 270); 60 Josh Esukpa – OL – (redshirt) sophomore (6'1, 260); 61 Draven Taylor – OT – (redshirt) sophomore (6'2, 298); 63 Tyler Preston – C – (redshirt) freshman (6'3, 300); 64 Roberto Limon – OG – (redshirt) freshman (6'3, 325); 68 Isaiah Carrizales – OL – freshman (6'1, 225); 69 Trevor Mason – OT – (redshirt) junior (6'7, 290); 70 Nathan Thompson – OT – senior (6'5, 300); 71 Aaron Rodriguez – OL – freshman (6'3, 282); 74 Cameron Wilson – OT – freshman (6'4, 290); 75 Jeremy Jones – OG – freshman (6'5, 287); 76 Austin Jennings – OG – (redshirt) sophomore (6'4, 290); 77 Zach Fattig – OG – junior (6'3, 285); Defensive line: 54 Corey Lee – DE – junior (6'0, 272); 55 Darius Montgomery – DE – (redshirt) freshman (6'2, 266); 59 Sam Hines – NT – “ (redshirt) Senior (6’0, 250)”; 72 Phillip Higgins – DE – freshman (6'0, 240); 88 Justin Roberts – DE – “ (redshirt) Sophomore (6’4, 255)”; 91 Dallin Muti – NT – (redshirt) senior (5'11, 285); 93 Tyler Colbert – NT – (redshirt) sophomore (6'1, 300); 94 Phillip Franco – DL – “Freshman (6’0, 240)”; 96 John Williams – NT – freshman (6'2, 310); 97 Eric England – NT – sophomore (6'0, 270); 98 Jawara Beasley – DE – sophomore (6'3, 252)	Linebacker: 8 Myke Tavarres – OLB – (redshirt) senior (6'2, 220); 9 Josh Zellars – ILB – junior (6'0, 210); 15 Quandre Washington – ILB – sophomore (6'1, 217); 19 Jerome McElroy – OLB/DE – “Senior (6’0, 240)”; 33 Joel Higgins – ILB – junior (6'0, 225); 34 Greg Lemon – OLB – (redshirt) sophomore (6'2, 235); 35 Padyn Giebler – ILB – “Senior (6’0, 230)”; 43 Michael Allen – ILB – junior (6'0, 210); 50 George Schwanenberg – ILB – sophomore (5'11, 215); 51 Denzel Thomas – OLB – sophomore (6'1, 225); 52 Israel Acuay – OLB – (redshirt) freshman (6'2, 245); 56 Noah McMeans – OLB – freshman (6'4, 205); 65 Halston Draeger – OLB – “Freshman (6’0, 211); 66 West Lambert – ILB – freshman (6'0, 220); 92 Blake Klumpp – OLB – (redshirt) freshman (6'3, 240); Defensive back: 1 Daryl Irby – CB – (redshirt) junior (5'10, 179); 10 Brandon Tanksley – S – senior (6'2, 210); 12 Robert Johnson – S – senior (6'0, 200); 13 Jeilyn Williams – CB – sophomore (5'9, 170); 14 Jared Ambres – S – (redshirt) sophomore (6'0, 200); 17 Sean Hoeferkamp – S – sophomore (6'1, 201); 18 Adrian Norwood Jr. – S – junior (6'0, 205); 23 Kobie Douglas – CB – (redshirt) senior (5'9, 162); 27 Trey Colbert – S – (redshirt) junior (6'0, 210); 28 Da’Shawn Brown-Key – DB – freshman (6'1, 180); 30 Jawun Jiles – S – freshman (5'10, 193); 31 Troy Lara – S – (redshirt) senior (5'11, 195); 32 Jamarkese Williams – CB – (redshirt) freshman (6'3, 183); 36 Shane Piatnik – S – (redshirt) freshman (6'0, 200); 37 Damon Weaver – S – “Freshman (6’0, 190); 38 Tim McCoy – S – (redshirt) freshman (5'11, 195); 48 David Nader – DB – (redshirt) sophomore (5'11, 200); Place kicker: 41 Cody Seidel – freshman (6'2, 200); Punter: 42 Chase Ellerbee – freshman (6'2, 210); 49 Ramon Coto, Jr. – “Sophomore (5’11, 240)”

== Depth chart ==
Defense

FS
12 Robert Johnson, Sr
17 Sean Hoeferkamp, So

WLB	ILB	ILB	SLB
92 Blake Klumpp, Fr	9 Josh Zellars, Jr	35 Padyn Giebler, Sr	8 Myke Tavarres, Sr
51 Denzel Thomas, So	15 Quandre Washington, So	33 Joel Higgins, Jr	52 Israel Acuay, Fr

SS
18 Adrian Norwood, Jr
30 Juwan Jiles, Fr

CB
23 Kobie Douglas, Sr
13 Jeilyn Williams, Fr

DE	NT	DE
98 Jawara Beasley, So	91 Dallin Muti, Sr	99 Alex Jenkins, Jr
55 Darrius Montgomery, Fr	93 Tyler Colbert, So	19 Jerome McElroy, Sr

CB
31 Troy Lara, Sr
32 Jamarkese Williams, Fr

Offense

WR
81 Kody Edwards, So
11 Clint Killough, Sr

LT	LG	C	RG	RT
70 Nathan Thompson, Sr	76 Austin Jennings, So	53 Matt McCarthy, Jr	57 Devyn Jensen, So	61 Draven Taylor, So
69 Trevor Mason, Jr	64 Roberto Limon, Fr	63 Tyler Preston, Fr	77 Zach Fattig, Jr	74 Cameron Wilson, Fr

TE
45 Cole Wick, Sr
44 Cyril Clarke, Sr

WR
22 Jamari Gilbert, So
2 Jordan Hicks, Jr

QB
4 Trent Brittain, So
17 Jordan Scelfo, Sr

RB
26 Junior Sessions, Jr
25 Broderick Reeves, Jr

FB
29 John Oglesby, Jr
44 Cyril Clarke, Jr

Special teams
PK 41 Cody Seidel, Fr
P 49 Ramon Coto, Jr., So
KR 22 Jamari Gilbert, So
PR 81 Kody Edwards, So
LS 92 Blake Klumpp, Fr
H 17 Jordan Scelfo, Sr

== Postseason honors ==
The following Cardinals received postseason honors for the 2015 season:

Associated Press FCS All-America Second-Team
LB Myke Tavarres - Senior

STATS FCS All-America First-Team
LB Myke Tavarres - Senior

AFCA FCS All-America First-Team
LB Myke Tavarres - Senior

All-Southland Conference First-Team
TE Cole Wick - Senior
LB Myke Tavarres - Senior

All-Southland Conference Second-Team
DB Kobie Douglas - Senior

All-Southland Conference Honorable Mention
QB Trent Brittain - Sophomore
OL Nathan Thompson - Senior
DE Alex Jenkins - Junior
LB Josh Zellars - Junior
DB Robert Johnson - Senior
KR Kody Edwards - Sophomore
PR Jordan Hicks - Junior

Southland Conference Newcomer of the Year
LB Myke Tavarres - Senior

NFLPA Collegiate Bowl Invitee
LB Myke Tavarres - Senior

Southland Conference Academic All-Conference
QB Trent Brittain - Sophomore
TE Cole Wick - Senior
DE Alex Jenkins - Junior
LB Padyn Giebler - Senior
DB Daryl Irby - Junior

CoSIDA Academic All-America First-Team
LB Padyn Giebler - Senior

== Game summaries ==
=== Texas A&M–Kingsville ===
Texas A&M–Kingsville

Texas A&M–Kingsville at Incarnate Word

Team	1	2	3	4	Total
Javelinas	0	9	7	0	16
• Cardinals	0	3	7	8	18

- Date: September 5
- Location: Gayle and Tom Benson Stadium
  San Antonio, TX
- Game start: 2:00 PM CDT
- Elapsed time: 2:59
- Game attendance: 5,229
- Game weather: 93°, Slightly overcast
- Referee: Eddie Kelly
- TV announcers (UIWtv): Chris Reyes & Anthony Gollab
Sources: Box Score

Scoring summary
2	11:37	Incarnate Word	Cody Seidel 29 yard field goal, Drive: 13 plays, 68 yards, 5:09	3–0
2	7:43	Texas A&M-Kingsville	Team Safety, Drive: 4 plays, -20 yards, 1:27	3–2
2	3:39	Texas A&M-Kingsville	Joe Te'o 1 yard run (Julio De la Garza kick), Drive: 10 plays, 77 yards, 3:57	3–9
3	4:29	Incarnate Word	Jordan Hicks 66 yard punt return (Cody Seidel kick), Drive: 3 plays, 2 yards, 1:56	10–9
3	1:50	Texas A&M-Kingsville	Shawn Vasquez 17 yard pass from Myles Carr (Julio De la Garza kick), Drive: 6 plays, 69 yards, 2:31	10–16
4	5:04	Incarnate Word	Jordan Hicks 14 yard pass from Trent Brittain (Cody Seidel run), Drive: 4 plays, 74 yards, 1:57	18–16

=== @ McNeese State ===
Incarnate Word at McNeese State

Team	1	2	3	4	Total
Cardinals	0	0	0	6	6
• Cowboys	7	2	20	14	43

- Date: September 12
- Location: Cowboy Stadium
  Lake Charles, LA
- Game start: 6:00 PM CDT
- Elapsed time: 3:18
- Game attendance: 12,804
- Game weather: Fair
- Referee: Ross Smith
- TV announcers (ASN): Lincoln Rose & ND Kalu
Sources: Box Score

Scoring summary
1	3:50	McNeese State	Derrick Milton 36 yard run (Trent Manuel kick), Drive: 6 plays, 62 yards, 2:33	0–7
2	1:39	McNeese State	Team Safety, Drive: 0 plays, -1 yard, 0:07	0–9
3	10:36	McNeese State	Trent Manuel 20 yard field goal, Drive: 10 plays, 62 yards, 4:24	0–12
3	7:38	McNeese State	Austin Nelson 2 yard pass from Daniel Sams (Trent Manuel kick), Drive: 4 plays, 39 yards, 1:50	0–19
3	4:03	McNeese State	Trent Manuel 22 yard field goal, Drive: 5 plays, 43 yards, 1:52	0–22
3	0:26	McNeese State	Daniel Sams 2 yard run (Trent Manuel kick), Drive: 7 plays, 36 yards, 3:37	0–29
4	12:01	McNeese State	Grant Ashcraft 2 yard run (Trent Manuel kick), Drive: 5 plays, 22 yards, 2:09	0–36
4	7:15	Incarnate Word	Kody Edwards 11 yard pass from Jordan Scelfo (two-point pass conv. failed), Drive: 10 plays, 90 yards, 4:46	7–36
4	3:56	McNeese State	David Hamm 33 yard run (Trent Manuel kick), Drive: 1 play, 28 yards, 0:09	7–43

=== Nicholls State ===
Nicholls State at Incarnate Word

Team	1	2	3	4	Total
Colonels	7	3	0	0	10
• Cardinals	0	7	3	10	20

- Date: September 19
- Location: Gayle and Tom Benson Stadium
  San Antonio, TX
- Game start: 2:00 PM CDT
- Elapsed time: 2:51
- Game attendance: 3,009
- Game weather: 90 °F (32 °C), Partly cloudy
- Referee: Ross Smith
- TV announcers (UIWtv): Chris Reyes & Anthony Gollab
Sources: Box Score

Scoring summary
1	8:35	Nicholls	C.J. Bates 5 yard pass from Tuskani Figaro (Francisco Conado kick), Drive: 9 plays, 96 yards, 4:19	0–7
2	14:02	Incarnate Word	Cole Wick 12 yard pass from Trent Brittain (Cody Seidel kick), Drive: 9 plays, 84 yards, 4:12	7–7
2	9:16	Nicholls	Francisco Conado 42 yard field goal, Drive: 4 plays, 4 yards, 1:23	7–10
3	8:43	Incarnate Word	Ramon Coto 49 yard field goal, Drive: 4 plays, 1 yard, 0:44	10–10
4	13:13	Incarnate Word	Cody Seidel 25 yard field goal, Drive: 6 plays, 27 yards, 1:57	13–10
4	1:18	Incarnate Word	Trent Brittain 4 yard run (Cody Seidel kick), Drive: 8 plays, 68 yards, 3:13	20–10

=== @ UTEP ===
Incarnate Word at UTEP

Team	1	2	3	4	Total
Cardinals	3	7	7	0	17
• Miners	7	3	7	10	27

- Date: September 26
- Location: Sun Bowl Stadium
  El Paso, TX
- Game start: 7:00 PM CDT
- Elapsed time: 3:11
- Game attendance: 22,322
- Referee: Justin Elliott
Sources: Box Score

Scoring summary
1	11:24	Incarnate Word	Cody Seidel 32 yard field goal, Drive: 9 plays, 60 yards, 3:36	3–0
1	9:00	UTEP	Kalon Beverly 24 yard interception return (Jay Mattox kick), Drive: 1 play, 0 yards, 0:04	3–7
2	14:14	UTEP	Jay Mattox 50 yard field goal; Drive: 4 plays, 7 yards, 1:42	3–10
2	0:04	Incarnate Word	Jamari Gilbert 34 yard pass from Trent Brittain (Cody Seidel kick), Drive: 11 plays, 80 yards, 3:03	10–10
3	8:14	Incarnate Word	Jamari Gilbert 90 yard pass from Trent Brittain (Cody Seidel kick), Drive: 3 plays, 80 yards, 0:48	17–10
3	2:35	UTEP	Autrey Golden 10 yard pass from Ryan Metz (Jay Mattox kick), Drive: 12 plays, 75 yards, 5:39	17–17
4	10:01	UTEP	Jay Mattox 32 yard field goal, Drive: 9 plays, 83 yards, 3:49	17–20
4	4:57	UTEP	Jaquan White 46 yard pass from Ryan Metz (Jay Mattox kick), Drive: 3 plays, 80 yards, 1:21	17–27

=== Northwestern State ===
Northwestern State at Incarnate Word

Team	1	2	3	4	Total
Demons	14	7	3	7	31
• Cardinals	0	14	14	17	45

- Date: October 3
- Location: Gayle and Tom Benson Stadium
  San Antonio, TX
- Game start: 2:00 PM CDT
- Elapsed time: 3:08
- Game attendance: 3,012
- Game weather: 82°, Sunny
- Referee: Michael VanderVelde
Sources: Box Score

Scoring summary
1	11:05	Northwestern State	Chris Jones 10 yard run (Chris Moore kick), Drive: 9 plays, 72 yards, 2:43	0–7
1	1:08	Northwestern State	Daniel Taylor 1 yard run (Chris Moore kick), Drive: 7 plays, 40 yards, 2:23	0–14
2	14:54	Incarnate Word	Kody Edwards 32 yard pass from Trent Brittain (Cody Seidel kick), Drive: 4 plays, 75 yards, 1:14	7–14
2	9:41	Northwestern State	De'Mard Llorens 1 yard run (Chris Moore kick), Drive: 12 plays, 75 yards, 5:13	7–21
2	0:26	Incarnate Word	Trent Brittain 2 yard run (Cody Seidel kick), Drive: 11 plays, 70 yards, 4:22	14–21
3	10:40	Incarnate Word	Broderick Reeves 23 yard run (Cody Seidel kick), Drive: 7 plays, 67 yards, 3:07	21–21
3	6:27	Northwestern State	Chris Moore 32 yard field goal, Drive: 10 plays, 60 yards, 4:13	21–24
3	0:23	Incarnate Word	Trent Brittain 1 yard run (Cody Seidel kick), Drive: 13 plays, 66 yards, 5:57	28–24
4	13:11	Incarnate Word	Trent Brittain 47 yard run (Cody Seidel kick), Drive: 2 plays, 70 yards, 0:43	35–24
4	9:53	Incarnate Word	John Oglesby 7 yard pass from Trent Brittain (Cody Seidel kick), Drive: 4 plays, 34 yards, 1:23	42–24
4	8:26	Northwestern State	Daniel Taylor 51 yard run (Chris Moore kick), Drive: 4 plays, 80 yards, 1:17	42–31
4	2:54	Incarnate Word	Cody Seidel 37 yard field goal, Drive: 10 plays, 55 yards, 5:32	45–31

=== @ Sam Houston State ===
Incarnate Word at Sam Houston State

Team	1	2	3	4	Total
Cardinals	0	0	7	0	7
• #11 Bearkats	24	28	7	0	59

- Date: October 10
- Location: Bowers Stadium
  Huntsville, TX
- Game start: 6:00 PM CDT
- Elapsed time: 3:10
- Game attendance: 6,508
- Referee: Kevin Hassell
Sources: Box Score

Scoring summary
1	10:55	Sam Houston State	Luc Swimberghe 34 yard field goal, Drive: 11 plays, 63 yards, 2:49	0–3
1	8:13	Sam Houston State	Cory Avery 66 yard pass from Jared Johnson (Luc Swimberghe kick) Drive: 3 plays, 76 yards, 1:08	0–10
1	6:53	Sam Houston State	LaDarius Brown 35 yard pass from Jared Johnson (Luc Swimberghe kick), Drive: 3 plays, 34 yards, 1:06	0–17
1	6:28	Sam Houston State	Donav Williams 1 yard run (Luc Swimberghe kick), Drive: 1 play, 1 yard, 0:03	0–24
2	12:53	Sam Houston State	Jal Overstreet 3 yard run (Luc Swimberghe kick), Drive: 7 plays, 30 yards, 2:24	0–31
2	11:51	Sam Houston State	Collin Okotcha 60 yard interception return (Luc Swimberghe kick), Drive: 3 plays, 53 yards, 0:57	0–38
2	8:05	Sam Houston State	LaDarius Brown 35 yard pass from Jeremi Briscoe (Luc Swimberghe kick), Drive: 7 plays, 94 yards, 1:42	0–45
2	2:05	Sam Houston State	Cory Avery 8 yard run (Luc Swimberghe kick), Drive: 12 plays, 93 yards, 4:38	0–52
3	9:02	Incarnate Word	Dorland Fields 1 yard run (Cody Seidel kick), Drive: 14 plays, 65 yards, 5:52	7–52
3	1:36	Sam Houston State	Remus Bulmer 8 yard run (Luc Swimberghe kick), Drive: 9 plays, 75 yards, 3:04	7–59

=== Abilene Christian ===
Abilene Christian at Incarnate Word

Team	1	2	3	4	Total
Wildcats	0	3	17	0	20
• Cardinals	7	3	6	9	25

- Date: October 25
- Location: Gayle and Tom Benson Stadium
  San Antonio, TX
- Game start: 2:00 PM CDT
- Elapsed time: 3:08
- Game attendance: 3,175
- Game weather: 64°, Overcast
- Referee: Randy Christal
- TV announcers (ASN): Lincoln Rose, Lemont Williams, Chris Mycoskie
Sources: Box Score

Scoring summary
1	8:32	Incarnate Word	Junior Sessions 1 yard run (Cody Seidel kick) Drive: 14 plays, 89 yards, 6:28	7–0
2	13:25	Incarnate Word	Cody Seidel 30 yard field goal, Drive: 11 plays, 78 yards, 4:12	10–0
2	0:00	Abilene Christian	Zach Lehr 28 yard field Goal, Drive: 17 plays, 66 yards, 3:02	10–3
3	14:48	Abilene Christian	De'Andre Brown 70 yard run (Zach Lehr kick), Drive: 1 play, 70 yards, 0:12	10–10
3	8:44	Abilene Christian	Zach Lehr 32 yard field goal, Drive: 9 plays, 49 yards, 4:05	10–13
3	5:07	Incarnate Word	Jordan Hicks 4 yard pass from Trent Brittain (Cody Seidel kick blocked), Drive: 8 plays, 84 yards, 3:30	16–13
3	4:57	Abilene Christian	Carl Whitley 75 yard pass from Dallas Sealey (Zach Lehr kick), Drive: 1 play, 75 yards, 0:10	16–20
4	14:03	Incarnate Word	Cody Seidel 22 yard field goal, Drive: 15 plays, 72 yards, 5:45	19–20
4	0:48	Incarnate Word	Junior Sessions 15 yard run (two-point pass conv. failed), Drive: 7 plays, 76 yards, 2:37	25–20

=== @ Stephen F. Austin ===
Incarnate Word at Stephen F. Austin

Team	1	2	3	4	Total
Cardinals	7	7	7	0	21
• Lumberjacks	7	20	14	14	55

- Date: October 31
- Location: Homer Bryce Stadium
  Nacogdoches, TX
- Game start: 3:00 PM CDT
- Elapsed time: 3:15
- Game attendance: 4,814
- Game weather: Mid 60s, Cloudy, Misty
- Referee: Kevin Boitmann
- Television network: ESPN3
Sources: Box Score

Scoring summary
1	4:01	Stephen F. Austin	Loren Easly 41 yard run (Mason Juhl kick), Drive: 5 plays, 76 yards, 2:04	0–7
1	0:22	Incarnate Word	Jordan Hicks 36 yard pass from Trent Brittain (Cody Seidel kick), Drive: 7 plays, 77 yards, 3:34	7–7
2	11:55	Stephen F. Austin	Mason Juhl 25 yard field goal, Drive: 8 plays, 58 yards, 3:20	7–10
2	7:00	Stephen F. Austin	Judah Jones 9 yard pass from Zach Conque (Mason Juhl kick), Drive: 7 plays, 39 yards, 3:09	7–17
2	3:54	Stephen F. Austin	Aaron Piper 66 yard pass from Zach Conque (Mason Juhl kick), Drive: 3 plays, 71 yards, 1:28	7–24
2	0:36	Incarnate Word	Sean Flannel 4 yard run (Cody Seidel kick), Drive: 2 plays, 5 yards, 0:42	14–24
2	0:00	Stephen F. Austin	Mason Juhl 48 yard field goal, Drive: 6 plays, 19 yards, 0:28	14–27
3	14:46	Incarnate Word	Kody Edwards 100 yard kickoff return (Cody Seidel kick), Drive: 0 plays, 0 yards, 0:00	21–27
3	10:30	Stephen F. Austin	Tre Rosser 47 yard fumble recovery (Mason Juhl kick), Drive: 3 plays, 17 yards, 1:14	21–34
3	6:07	Stephen F. Austin	Aaron Piper 26 yard pass from Zach Conque (Mason Juhl kick), Drive: 9 plays, 73 yards, 3:15	21–41
4	9:27	Stephen F. Austin	De'Quan Ruffin 29 yard pass from Zach Conque (Mason Juhl kick), Drive: 11 plays, 58 yards, 5:24	21–48
4	1:00	Stephen F. Austin	Marlon Walls 13 yard interception return (Mason Juhl kick), Drive: 3 plays, 0 yards, 0:53	21–55

=== @ Southeastern Louisiana ===
Incarnate Word at Southeastern Louisiana

Team	1	2	3	4	Total
• Cardinals	7	3	6	0	16
Lions	0	2	0	0	2

- Date: November 7
- Location: Strawberry Stadium
  Hammond, LA
- Game start: 7:00 PM CST
- Elapsed time: 2:57
- Game attendance: 3,474
- Game weather: 70 °F (21 °C), Heavy Rain
- Referee: Marvel July
- Television network: ESPN3
Sources: Box Score

Scoring summary
1	12:27	Incarnate Word	Sean Flannel 1 yard run (Cody Seidel kick), Drive: 2 plays, 3 yards, 0:38	7–0
2	13:01	Incarnate Word	Cody Seidel 29 yard field goal, Drive: 8 plays, 53 yards, 3:54	10–0
2	4:44	Southeastern Louisiana	Team Safety, Drive: 4 plays, -6 yards, 1:00	10–2
3	8:06	Incarnate Word	Trent Brittain 58 yard run (Cody Seidel kick blocked), Drive: 3 plays, 63 yards, 0:47	16–2

=== Lamar ===
Lamar at Incarnate Word

Team	1	2	3	4	Total
• Cardinals (LU)	7	0	7	14	28
Cardinals (UIW)	0	7	0	14	21

- Date: November 14
- Location: Gayle and Tom Benson Stadium
  San Antonio, TX
- Game start: 2:00 PM CST
- Elapsed time: 2:57
- Game attendance: 4,402
- Game weather: 61 °F (16 °C), Wind NE 2 mph (3.2 km/h) Weather: Overcast and cool
- Referee: Randy Christal
Sources: Box Score

Scoring summary
1	10:26	Lamar	Kad Harrington 9 yard run (Alex Ball kick), Drive: 10 plays, 75 yards, 4:44	0–7
2	6:35	Incaranate Word	Justin Roberts 31 yard interception return (Cody Seidel kick), Drive: 4 plays, 11 yards, 1:41	7–7
3	3:38	Lamar	Brenda Langley 86 yard interception return (Alex Ball kick), Drive: 10 plays, 42 yards, 4:20	7–14
4	14:52	Lamar	Kad Harrington 45 yard run (Alex Ball kick), Drive: 6 plays, 73 yards, 2:12	7–21
4	14:14	Incarnate Word	Junio Sessions 2 yard run (Cody Seidel kick), Drive: 2 plays, 75 yards, 0:38	14–21
4	8:50	Lamar	Mart Hawthorne 7 yard pass from Minden, Joe (Alex Ball kick) Drive: 11 plays, 84 yards, 5:15	14–28
4	3:44	Incarnate Word	Trent Brittain 2 yard run (Cody Seidel kick), Drive: 14 plays, 75 yards, 5:06	21–28

=== @ Houston Baptist ===
Incarnate Word at Houston Baptist

Team	1	2	3	4	Total
• Cardinals	14	7	7	2	30
Huskies	0	3	0	0	3

- Date: November 21
- Location: Husky Stadium
  Houston, TX
- Game start: 2:00 PM CST
- Elapsed time: 2:35
- Game attendance: 2,251
- Game weather: 63 °F (17 °C), Overcast and Windy
- Referee: Marvel Judy
Sources: Box Score

Scoring summary
1	7:08	Incarnate Word	Trent Brittain 3 yard run (Cody Seidel kick), Drive: 13 plays, 52 yards, 6:21	7–0
1	1:40	Incarnate Word	Paden Giebler 47 yard fumble return (Cody Seidel kick), Drive: 6 plays, 8 yards, 3:23	14–0
2	10:44	Houston Baptist	Travis Shinn 27 yard field goal, Drive: 13 plays, 64 yards, 5:56	14–3
2	2:18	Incarnate Word	Trent Brittain 8 yard run (Cody Seidel kick), Drive: 13 plays, 60 yards, 6:11	21–3
3	4:00	Incarnate Word	Cole Wick 12 yard pass from Trent Brittain (Cody Seidel kick), Drive: 10 plays, 73 yards, 5:36	28–3
4	6:55	Incarnate Word	Team Safety, Drive: 6 plays, 2 yards, 2:11	30–3
