= 2015 Northwestern State Demons football team =

American college football season

2015 Northwestern State Demons football
- Conference: Southland Conference
- Record: 4–7 (4–5 Southland)
- Head coach: Jay Thomas (3rd season)
- Offensive coordinator: Ben Norton (2nd season)
- Defensive coordinator: Daryl Daye (1st season)
- Home stadium: Harry Turpin Stadium

2015 Southland Conference football standings
| | Conf. | | | Overall |
| Team | W | | L | W | | L |
|---|---|---|---|---|---|---|
| No. 7 McNeese State $^ | 9 | – | 0 | 10 | – | 1 |
| No. 3 Sam Houston State ^ | 7 | – | 2 | 11 | – | 4 |
| Central Arkansas | 7 | – | 2 | 7 | – | 4 |
| Incarnate Word * | 5 | – | 4 | 6 | – | 5 |
| Lamar | 4 | – | 5 | 5 | – | 6 |
| Northwestern State | 4 | – | 5 | 4 | – | 7 |
| Stephen F. Austin | 4 | – | 5 | 4 | – | 7 |
| SE Louisiana | 3 | – | 6 | 4 | – | 7 |
| Abilene Christian * | 3 | – | 6 | 3 | – | 8 |
| Nicholls State | 3 | – | 6 | 3 | – | 8 |
| Houston Baptist | 0 | – | 8 | 2 | – | 9 |
$ – Conference champion; ^ – FCS playoff participant; * – ineligible for FCS playoffs due to transition from NCAA Division II; Rankings from STATS poll

The 2015 Northwestern State Demons football team represented Northwestern State University as a member of the Southland Conference during the 2015 NCAA Division I FCS football season. Led by third-year head coach Jay Thomas, the Demons compiled an overall record of 4–7 with a mark of 4–5 in conference play, placing in a three-way tie for fifth in the Southland. Northwestern State played home games at Harry Turpin Stadium in Natchitoches, Louisiana.

== Schedule ==
| Date | Time | Opponent | Site | TV | Result | Attendance |
|---|---|---|---|---|---|---|
| September 3 | 6:00 pm | No. 19 Southeastern Louisiana | Harry Turpin Stadium; Natchitoches, LA (rivalry) | ASN | L 20–34 | 10,621 |
| September 12 | 6:00 pm | at Louisiana–Lafayette* | Cajun Field; Lafayette, LA | ESPN3 | L 17–44 | 26,824 |
| September 19 | 3:00 pm | at Mississippi State* | Davis Wade Stadium; Starkville, MS | SECN | L 13–62 | 61,574 |
| September 26 | 6:00 pm | Central Arkansas | Harry Turpin Stadium; Natchitoches, LA | ESPN3 | L 21–49 | 10,725 |
| October 3 | 6:00 pm | at Incarnate Word | Gayle and Tom Benson Stadium; San Antonio, TX | UIWtv | L 31–45 | 3,012 |
| October 17 | 6:00 pm | Lamar^{†} | Harry Turpin Stadium; Natchitoches, LA | DemonTV | W 48–35 | 9,133 |
| October 24 | 6:00 pm | at No. 12 McNeese State | Cowboy Stadium; Lake Charles, LA (rivalry) | CST | L 27–47 | 9,806 |
| October 31 | 3:00 pm | at Nicholls State | John L. Guidry Stadium; Thibodaux, LA (NSU Challenge) | SLDN | W 37–21 | 5,066 |
| November 7 | 6:00 pm | Abilene Christian | Harry Turpin Stadium; Natchitoches, LA | | W 39–22 | 5,377 |
| November 14 | 2:30 pm | at No. 13 Sam Houston State | Bowers Stadium; Huntsville, TX | SLDN | L 21–59 | 7,408 |
| November 21 | 3:00 pm | Stephen F. Austin | Harry Turpin Stadium; Natchitoches, LA (Chief Caddo) | SLDN | W 33–17 | 6,147 |
*Non-conference game; ^{†}Homecoming; Rankings from STATS Poll released prior to the game; All times are in Central time

== Game summaries ==
=== Southeastern Louisiana ===
Southeastern Louisiana at Northwestern State

| Team | 1 | 2 | 3 | 4 | Total |
|---|---|---|---|---|---|
| • #19 Lions | 6 | 7 | 13 | 8 | 34 |
| Demons | 3 | 3 | 7 | 7 | 20 |

- Date: September 3
- Location: Harry Turpin Stadium
  Natchitoches, LA
- Game start: 6:00 PM CDT
- Elapsed time: 3:32
- Game attendance: 10,621
- Game weather: 93 °F (34 °C) • Wind: 1 N • Humid and sticky
- Referee: Ross Smith
- Television network: ASN

Scoring summary
| 1 | 13:01 | Northwestern State | Chris Moore 37 yd field goal | 3–0 |
| 1 | 1:42 | Southeastern Louisiana | Xavier Roberson run for 1 yd for a TD, Jonathon Tatum extra point failed | 3–6 |
| 2 | 12:26 | Northwestern State | Chris Moore 46 yd field goal | 6–6 |
| 2 | 0:43 | Southeastern Louisiana | Jeff Smiley run for 12 yds for a TD, Jonathon Tatum kick good | 6–13 |
| 3 | 9:58 | Southeastern Louisiana | Kody Sutton run for 2 yds for a TD, Jonathon Tatum extra point failed | 6–19 |
| 3 | 6:03 | Southeastern Louisiana | D'Shaie Landor run for 81 yds for a TD, Jonathon Tatum kick good | 6–26 |
| 3 | 3:16 | Northwestern State | Daniel Taylor run for 27 yds for a TD, Chris Moore kick good | 13–26 |
| 4 | 8:53 | Northwestern State | Joel Blumenthal pass complete to Shakeir Ryan for 44 yds for a TD, Chris Moore kick good | 20–26 |
| 4 | 1:01 | Southeastern Louisiana | Kody Sutton run for 3 yds for a TD, D'Shaie Landor pass to Jeff Smiley for Two-Point Conversion | 20–34 |

=== @ Louisiana–Lafayette ===
Northwestern State at Louisiana–Lafayette

| Team | 1 | 2 | 3 | 4 | Total |
|---|---|---|---|---|---|
| Demons | 0 | 10 | 7 | 0 | 17 |
| • Ragin' Cajuns | 14 | 13 | 7 | 10 | 44 |

- Date: September 12
- Location: Cajun Field
  Lafayette, LA
- Game start: 6:00 PM CDT
- Elapsed time: 2:56
- Game attendance: 26,824
- Game weather: 82 °F (28 °C) • Wind: NNE 14 • Mostly Sunny
- Referee: Jeff Hilyer
- Television network: ESPN3

Scoring summary
| 1 | 13:01 | Louisiana–Lafayette | Elijah McGuire run for 7 yds for a TD, (Stevie Artigue KICK), 6 plays, 75 yards, 1:59 | 0–7 |
| 1 | 9:07 | Louisiana–Lafayette | Elijah McGuire run for 88 yds for a TD, (Stevie Artigue KICK), 1 play, 88 yards, 0:13 | 0–14 |
| 2 | 10:17 | Northwestern State | Chris Jones run for 41 yds for a TD, (Chris Moore KICK), 7 plays, 76 yards, 4:31 | 7–14 |
| 2 | 3:55 | Louisiana–Lafayette | Elijah McGuire run for 3 yds for a TD, (Stevie Artigue PAT MISSED), 11 plays, 69 yards, 6:22 | 7–20 |
| 2 | 1:16 | Louisiana–Lafayette | Elijah McGuire run for 24 yds for a TD, (Stevie Artigue KICK), 3 plays, 40 yards, 1:06 | 7–27 |
| 2 | 0:07 | Northwestern State | Chris Moore 21 yd FG GOOD, 7 plays, 65 yards, 1:09 | 10–27 |
| 3 | 6:16 | Louisiana–Lafayette | Elijah McGuire run for 1 yd for a TD, (Stevie Artigue KICK), 8 plays, 78 yards, 3:17 | 10–34 |
| 3 | 2:30 | Northwestern State | J.D. Almond pass complete to Cody Jones for 14 yds for a TD, (Chris Moore KICK), 10 plays, 75 yards, 3:46 | 17–34 |
| 4 | 14:56 | Louisiana–Lafayette | Torrey Pierce run for 1 yd for a TD, (Stevie Artigue KICK), 6 plays, 74 yards, 2:34 | 17–41 |
| 4 | 7:33 | Louisiana–Lafayette | Stevie Artigue 26 Yd Field Goal, 8 plays, 58 yards, 4:04 | 17–44 |

=== @ Mississippi State ===
Northwestern at Mississippi State

| Team | 1 | 2 | 3 | 4 | Total |
|---|---|---|---|---|---|
| Demons | 0 | 6 | 7 | 0 | 13 |
| • Bulldogs | 20 | 14 | 14 | 14 | 62 |

- Date: September 19
- Location: Davis Wade Stadium
  Starkville, MS
- Game start: 3:00 PM CDT
- Elapsed time: 3:00
- Game attendance: 61,574
- Game weather: 95 °F (35 °C) • Light Wind • Clear Skies
- Referee: Marc Curles
- TV announcers (SECN): Dave Neal (Play-by-Play), Matt Stinchcomb (Color), Kayce Smith (Sideline Reporter)
Source: Northwestern State vs Mississippi State

Scoring summary
| 1 | 13:21 | Mississippi State | Gabe Myles 49-yard touchdown pass from Dak Prescott, Logan Cooke pass failed | 0–6 |
| 1 | 3:42 | Mississippi State | Ashton Shumpert 17-yard touchdown run, Westin Graves kick good | 0–13 |
| 1 | 0:07 | Mississippi State | Aeris Williams 1-yard touchdown run, Westin Graves kick good | 0–20 |
| 2 | 10:09 | Northwestern State | Chris Moore 52-yard kick good | 3–20 |
| 2 | 8:39 | Mississippi State | Gabe Myles 6-yard touchdown run, Westin Graves kick good | 3–27 |
| 2 | 2:27 | Northwestern State | Chris Moore 26-yard kick good | 6–27 |
| 2 | 0:56 | Mississippi State | Brandon Holloway 6-yard touchdown pass from Dak Prescott, Westin Graves kick good | 6–34 |
| 3 | 6:59 | Northwestern State | De'Mard Llorens 10-yard touchdown run, Chris Moore kick good | 13–34 |
| 3 | 4:02 | Mississippi State | Nick Fitzgerald 4-yard touchdown run, Westin Graves kick good | 13–41 |
| 3 | 0:26 | Mississippi State | Joe Morrow 37-yard touchdown pass from Elijah Staley, Westin Graves kick good | 13–48 |
| 4 | 12:12 | Mississippi State | Donald Gray 49-yard touchdown pass from Nick Fitzgerald, Devon Bell kick good | 13–55 |
| 4 | 1:48 | Mississippi State | Nick Fitzgerald 3-yard touchdown run, Devon Bell kick good | 13–62 |

=== Central Arkansas ===
Central Arkansas at Northwestern State

| Team | 1 | 2 | 3 | 4 | Total |
|---|---|---|---|---|---|
| • Bears | 18 | 10 | 14 | 7 | 49 |
| Demons | 0 | 7 | 7 | 7 | 21 |

- Date: September 26
- Location: Harry Turpin Stadium
  Natchitoches, LA
- Game start: 6:00 PM CDT
- Elapsed time: 3:25
- Game attendance: 10,725
- Game weather: 87 °F (31 °C) • Wind: NNE 7 • Mostly Sunny
- Referee: Ross Smith
- Television network: ESPN3

Scoring summary
| 1 | 10:17 | Central Arkansas | Alex Deason 47 Yd Field Goal, 12 plays, 44 yards, 4:43 | 0–3 |
| 1 | 6:32 | Central Arkansas | Desmond Smith 16 Yd pass from Taylor Reed (Scott Matiaha Run for Two-Point Conversion), 3 plays, 27 yards, 1:01 | 0–11 |
| 1 | 2:47 | Central Arkansas | Blake Veasley 1 Yd Run (Jace Denker Kick), 4 plays, 64 yards, 1:32 | 0–18 |
| 2 | 10:12 | Central Arkansas | Blake Veasley 3 Yd Run (Jace Denker Kick), 11 plays, 80 yards, 4:43 | 0–25 |
| 2 | 4:31 | Central Arkansas | Jace Denker 22 Yd Field Goal, 4 plays, 6 yards, 1:54 | 0–28 |
| 2 | 1:28 | Northwestern State | Ed Eagan 6 Yd pass from J.D. Almond (Chris Moore Kick), 8 plays, 83 yards, 2:57 | 7–28 |
| 3 | 10:05 | Central Arkansas | Jacquez McMillian 45 Yd pass from Hayden Hildebrand (Jace Denker Kick), 9 plays, 83 yards, 3:19 | 7–35 |
| 4 | 8:12 | Northwestern State | De'Mard Llorens 4 Yd Run (Chris Moore Kick), 7 plays, 75 yards, 1:53 | 14–35 |
| 4 | 5:17 | Central Arkansas | Jatavious Wilson 42 Yd pass from Hayden Hildebrand (Jace Denker Kick), 1 play, 42 yards, 0:08 | 14–42 |
| 4 | 12:19 | Central Arkansas | Blake Gardner 22 Yd pass from Hayden Hildebrand (Jace Denker Kick), 7 plays, 86 yards, 3:14 | 14–49 |
| 4 | 8:35 | Northwestern State | Ed Eagan 28 Yd pass from J.D. Almond (Chris Moore Kick), 10 plays, 73 yards, 3:38 | 21–49 |

=== @ Incarnate Word ===
Northwestern State at Incarnate Word

| Team | 1 | 2 | 3 | 4 | Total |
|---|---|---|---|---|---|
| Demons | 14 | 7 | 3 | 7 | 31 |
| • Cardinals | 0 | 14 | 14 | 17 | 45 |

- Date: October 3
- Location: Gayle and Tom Benson Stadium
  San Antonio, TX
- Game start: 6:00 PM CDT
- Elapsed time: 3:08
- Game attendance: 3,012
- Game weather: 82 °F (28 °C) • Wind: ENE 6 • Sunny
- Referee: Michael VanderVelde
- Television network: UIWtv

Scoring summary
| 1 | 11:05 | Northwestern State | Chris Jones 10 Yd Run, Chris Moore Kick; 9 plays, 72 yards, 2:43 | 7–0 |
| 1 | 1:08 | Northwestern State | Daniel Taylor 1 Yd run, Chris Moore Kick; 7 plays, 40 yards, 2:23 | 14–0 |
| 2 | 14:54 | Incarnate Word | Kody Edwards 32 Yd Pass from Trent Brittain, Cody Seidel Kick; 4 plays, 75 yards, 1:14 | 14–7 |
| 2 | 9:41 | Northwestern State | De'Mard Llorens 1 Yd Run, Chris Moore Kick; 12 plays, 75 yards, 5:13 | 21–7 |
| 2 | 0:26 | Incarnate Word | Trent Brittain 2 Yd Run, Cody Seidel Kick; 11 plays, 70 yards, 4:22 | 14–21 |
| 3 | 10:40 | Incarnate Word | Broderick Reeves 23 Yd Run, Cody Seidel Kick; 7 plays, 67 yards, 3:07 | 21–21 |
| 3 | 6:27 | Northwestern State | Chris Moore 32 Yd Field Goal; 10 plays, 60 yards, 4:13 | 24–21 |
| 3 | 0:23 | Incarnate Word | Trent Brittain 1 Yd Run, Cody Seidel Kick; 13 plays, 66 yards, 5:57 | 24–28 |
| 4 | 13:11 | Incarnate Word | Trent Brittain 47 Yd Run, Cody Seidel Kick; 2 plays, 70 yards, 0:43 | 24–35 |
| 4 | 9:53 | Incarnate Word | John Oglesby 7 Yd Pass from Trent Brittain, Cody Seidel Kick; 4 plays, 34 yards, 1:23 | 24–42 |
| 4 | 8:26 | Northwestern State | Daniel Taylor 51 Yd Run, Chris Moore Kick; 4 plays, 80 yards, 1:17 | 31–42 |
| 4 | 2:54 | Incarnate Word | Cody Seidel 37 Yd Field Goal; 10 plays, 55 yards, 5:32 | 31–45 |

=== Lamar ===
Lamar at Northwestern State

| Team | 1 | 2 | 3 | 4 | Total |
|---|---|---|---|---|---|
| Cardinals | 0 | 14 | 7 | 14 | 35 |
| • Demons | 14 | 17 | 3 | 14 | 48 |

- Date: October 17
- Location: Harry Turpin Stadium
  Natchitoches, LA
- Game start: 6:00 PM CDT
- Elapsed time: 3:31
- Game attendance: 9,133
- Game weather: 77 °F (25 °C) • NE 9 • Sunny and mild
- Referee: Scott Campbell

Scoring summary
| 1 | 12:43 | Northwestern State | Daniel Taylor 12 yard run (Chris Moore kick), 4 plays, 67 yards, TOP 2:17 | 7–0 |
| 1 | 03:47 | Northwestern State | De'Mar Llorens 53 yard run (Chris Moore kick), 4 plays, 64 yards, TOP 1:20 | 14–0 |
| 2 | 14:26 | Northwestern State | Chris Moore 26 yard field goal 9 plays, 58 yards, TOP 3:31 | 17–0 |
| 2 | 14:13 | Lamar | Kad Harrington 79 yard run (Alex Ball kick), 1 plays, 75 yards, TOP 0:13 | 17–7 |
| 2 | 9:31 | Northwestern State | Shakeir Ryan 22 yard pass from Stephen Rivers (Chris Moore kick), 5 plays, 60 yards, TOP 1:45 | 24–7 |
| 2 | 8:13 | Lamar | Kad Harrington 5 yard run (Alex Ball kick), 3 plays, 59 yards, TOP 1:10 | 24–14 |
| 2 | 00:13 | Northwestern State | Zach White 2 yard pass from Stephen Rivers (Chris Moore kick), 8 plays, 68 yards, TOP 3:27 | 31–14 |
| 3 | 12:35 | Lamar | Kad Harrington 2 yard run (Alex Ball kick), 6 plays, 65 yards, TOP 2:25 | 31–21 |
| 3 | 02:54 | Northwestern State | Chris Moore 28 yard field goal, 11 plays, 55 yards, TOP 5:50 | 34–21 |
| 4 | 14:17 | Northwestern State | Adam Jones 95 yard fumble recovery (Chris Moore kick) | 41–21 |
| 4 | 11:36 | Lamar | Kad Harrington 3 yard run (Alex Ball kick), 7 plays, 42 yards, TOP 2:36 | 41–28 |
| 4 | 08:16 | Northwestern State | De'Mar Llorens 1 yard run (Chris Moore kick), 6 plays, 59 yards, TOP 3:19 | 48–28 |
| 4 | 05:41 | Lamar | Kad Harrington 2 yard run (Alex Ball kick), 8 plays, 75 yards, TOP 2:35 | 48–35 |

=== @ McNeese State ===
Northwestern State at McNeese State

| Team | 1 | 2 | 3 | 4 | Total |
|---|---|---|---|---|---|
| Demons | 7 | 3 | 10 | 7 | 27 |
| • #12 Cowboys | 7 | 7 | 13 | 20 | 47 |

- Date: October 24
- Location: Cowboy Stadium
  Lake Charles, LA
- Game start: 6:00 PM CDT
- Elapsed time: 3:28
- Game attendance: 9,806
- Game weather: 73 °F (23 °C) • NE 8 • Cloudy/40% rain
- Referee: Kevin Hassell

Scoring summary
| 1 | 14:47 | Northwestern State | Ed Eagan 97 yard kickoff return (Chris Moore kick) | 7–0 |
| 1 | 4:22 | McNeese State | Daniel Sams 1 yard run (Trent Manuel kick), 12 plays, 58 yards, 5:22 | 7–7 |
| 2 | 14:56 | McNeese State | Tavarious Battiste 29 yard pass from Daniel Sams (Trent Manuel kick), 8 plays, 62 yards, 3:19 | 7–14 |
| 2 | 7:45 | Northwestern State | Chris Moore 20 yard field goal, 16 plays, 74 yards, 7:11 | 10–14 |
| 3 | 14:40 | McNeese State | Kent Shelby 73 yard pass from Daniel Sams (Jean Breaux kick), 1 play, 73 yards, 0:20 | 10–21 |
| 3 | 14:24 | Northwestern State | Joel Blumenthal 62 yard run (Chris Moore kick), 1 play, 62 yards, 0:29 | 17–21 |
| 3 | 5:45 | Northwestern State | Chris Moore 44 yard field goal, 11 plays, 44 yards, 4:33 | 20–21 |
| 3 | 2:17 | McNeese State | Ryan Ross 2 yard run (Jean Breaux PAT failed), 7 plays, 65 yards, 3:28 | 20–27 |
| 4 | 14:53 | Northwestern State | Tuff McClain 42 yard pass from Stephen Rivers (Chris Moore kick), 5 plays, 73 yards, 2:24 | 27–27 |
| 4 | 12:42 | McNeese State | Daniel Sams 52 yard run (Jean Breaux kick), 4 plays, 65 yards, 2:11 | 27–34 |
| 4 | 5:25 | McNeese State | Austin Nelson 2 yard pass from Daniel Sams (Jean Breaux PAT blocked), 5 plays, 49 yards, 2:35 | 27–40 |
| 4 | 2:19 | McNeese State | Ryan Ross 1 yard run (Jean Breaux kick), 5 plays, 15 yards, 2:51 | 27–47 |

=== @ Nicholls ===
Northwestern State at Nicholls

| Team | 1 | 2 | 3 | 4 | Total |
|---|---|---|---|---|---|
| • Demons | 14 | 7 | 16 | 0 | 37 |
| Colonels | 7 | 7 | 7 | 0 | 21 |

- Date: October 31
- Location: John L. Guidry Stadium
  Thibodaux, LA
- Game start: 3:00 PM CDT
- Elapsed time: 3:05
- Game attendance: 5,066
- Game weather: 80 °F (27 °C) • S 12 mph • Rainy
- Referee: Kevin Mar

Scoring summary
| 1 | 9:25 | Nicholls | Michael Henry 19 yard pass from Tuskani Figaro (Francisco Condado kick), 7 plays, 60 yards, 2:35 | 0–7 |
| 1 | 6:24 | Northwestern State | De'Mard Llorens 1 yard run (Chris Moore kick) 7 plays, 56 yards, 2:55 | 7–7 |
| 1 | 3:10 | Northwestern State | De'Mard Llorens 24 yard run (Chris Moore kick), 5 plays, 53 yards, 1:43 | 14–7 |
| 2 | 10:43 | Northwestern State | De'Mard Llorens 13 yard run (Chris Moore kick), 12 plays, 88 yards, 4:58 | 21–7 |
| 2 | 1:49 | Nicholls | Michael Henry 1 yard run (Francisco Condado kick), 11 plays, 74 yards, 4:40 | 21–14 |
| 3 | 11:33 | Northwestern State | De'Mard Llorens 2 yard run (Chris Moore kick), 7 plays, 67 yards, 3:23 | 28–14 |
| 3 | 10:14 | Northwestern State | JeMarcus Marshall Safety, 3 plays, −13 yards, 1:13 | 30–14 |
| 3 | 8:12 | Northwestern State | Daniel Taylor 38 yard pass from Stephen Rivers (Chris Moore kick), 4 plays, 50 yards, 2:02 | 37–14 |
| 3 | 2:29 | Nicholls | Tuskani Figaro 39 yard run (Francisco Condado kick), 5 plays, 80 yards, 1:54 | 37–21 |

=== Abilene Christian ===
Abilene Christian at Northwestern State

| Team | 1 | 2 | 3 | 4 | Total |
|---|---|---|---|---|---|
| Wildcats | 7 | 0 | 0 | 15 | 22 |
| • Demons | 6 | 17 | 16 | 0 | 39 |

- Date: November 7
- Location: Harry Turpin Stadium
  Natchitoches, LA
- Game start: 6:00 PM CST
- Elapsed time: 3:03
- Game attendance: 5,377
- Game weather: 55 °F (13 °C) • NNE 3 • Chilly and Rainy
- Referee: Ross Smith

Scoring summary
| 1 | 13:43 | Northwestern State | Cody Jones 3 yard pass from Stephen Rivers (Chris Moore PAT failed), 3 plays, 27 yards, 1:17 | 6–0 |
| 1 | 3:24 | Abilene Christian | Dallas Sealey 11 yard run (Zach Lehr kick), 8 plays, 73 yards, 3:03 | 6–7 |
| 2 | 11:42 | Northwestern State | De'Mard Llorens 4 yard run (Chris Moore kick), 13 plays, 75 yards, 6:35 | 13–7 |
| 2 | 3:54 | Northwestern State | Chris Moore 52 yard field goal, 8 plays, 42 yards, 4:05 | 16–7 |
| 2 | 0:23 | Northwestern State | Shakeir Ryan 2 yard pass from Stephen Rivers (Chris Moore kick), 7 plays, 50 yards, 2:06 | 23–7 |
| 3 | 7:48 | Northwestern State | Chris Moore 31 yard field goal, 10 plays, 62 yards, 5:28 | 26–7 |
| 3 | 5:42 | Northwestern State | Ed Eagan 65 yard pass from Stephen Rivers (Chris Moore kick), 1 play, 65 yards, 0:10 | 33–7 |
| 3 | 0:56 | Northwestern State | Chris Jones 37 yard run (Chris Moore PAT blocked), 1 play, 32 yards, 0:20 | 39–7 |
| 4 | 14:49 | Abilene Christian | Herschel Sims 68 yard run (Zach Lehr kick), 3 plays, 75 yards, 1:03 | 39–14 |
| 4 | 7:21 | Abilene Christian | Cody Ennis 2 yard pass from Dallas Sealey (Dallas Sealey pass to Monte Green-Avery for two-point conv.), 15 plays, 79 yards, 5:38 | 39–22 |

=== @ Sam Houston State ===
Northwestern State at Sam Houston State

| Team | 1 | 2 | 3 | 4 | Total |
|---|---|---|---|---|---|
| Demons | 7 | 7 | 7 | 0 | 21 |
| • #13 Bearkats | 14 | 21 | 10 | 14 | 59 |

- Date: November 14
- Location: Bowers Stadium
  Huntsville, TX
- Game start: 2:30 PM CST
- Elapsed time: 3:03
- Game attendance: 7,408
- Referee: Cal McNeill

Scoring summary
| 1 | 13:29 | Sam Houston State | Yedidiah Louis 24 yard pass from Jared Johnson (Tre Honshtein kick), 7 plays, 75 yards, 1:31 | 0–7 |
| 1 | 3:51 | Northwestern State | Chris Jones 19 yard run (Chris Moore kick), 8 plays, 61 yards, 3:04 | 7–7 |
| 1 | 1:10 | Sam Houston State | Yedidiah Louis 24 yard pass from Jared Johnson (Tre Honshtein kick), 7 plays, 65 yards, 2:32 | 7–14 |
| 2 | 11:42 | Sam Houston State | Corey Avery 27 yard run (Tre Honshtein kick), 7 plays, 71 yards, 2:32 | 7–21 |
| 2 | 7:06 | Sam Houston State | Yedidiah Louis 9 yard run (Tre Honshtein kick), 11 plays, 77 yards, 2:59 | 7–28 |
| 2 | 5:27 | Sam Houston State | Gerald Thomas 15 yard pass from Jared Johnson (Tre Honshtein kick), 3 plays, 20 yards, 0:56 | 7–35 |
| 2 | 2:03 | Northwestern State | Ed Eagan 22 yard pass from Stephen Rivers (Chris Moore kick), 8 plays, 60 yards, 3:22 | 14–35 |
| 3 | 12:01 | Northwestern State | De'Mard Llorens 15 yard run (Chris Moore kick), 6 plays, 80 yards, 2:53 | 21–35 |
| 3 | 9:52 | Sam Houston State | Jalen Overstreet 8 yard run (Tre Honshtein kick), 8 plays, 65 yards, 2:09 | 21–42 |
| 3 | 5:23 | Sam Houston State | Tre Honshtein 31 yard field goal, 7 plays, 49 yards, 1:51 | 21–45 |
| 4 | 12:54 | Sam Houston State | Corey Avery 78 yard run (Tre Honshtein kick), 3 plays, 88 yards, 1:10 | 21–52 |
| 4 | 2:23 | Sam Houston State | Ridgeway Frank 11 yard run (Tre Honshtein kick), 12 plays, 87 yards, 5:20 | 21–59 |

=== Stephen F. Austin ===
Stephen F. Austin at Northwestern State

| Team | 1 | 2 | 3 | 4 | Total |
|---|---|---|---|---|---|
| Lumberjacks | 7 | 7 | 3 | 0 | 17 |
| • Demons | 0 | 17 | 10 | 6 | 33 |

- Date: November 21
- Location: Harry Turpin Stadium
  Natchitoches, LA
- Game start: 3:00 PM CST
- Game attendance: 6,147

Scoring summary
| 1 | – |
| 2 | – |
| 3 | – |
| 4 | – |
