= Cole Wick =

American football player (born 1993)

No. 89
- Position: Tight end

Personal information
- Born: November 30, 1993 (age 32); Hallettsville, Texas, U.S.
- Listed height: 6 ft 6 in (1.98 m)
- Listed weight: 257 lb (117 kg)

Career information
- High school: Sacred Heart Catholic School (Hallettsville)
- College: Incarnate Word
- NFL draft: 2016: undrafted

Career history
- Detroit Lions (2016); San Francisco 49ers (2017–2018); Tennessee Titans (2018); Oakland Raiders (2019)*; New Orleans Saints (2019–2020)*
- * Offseason or practice squad member only

Awards and highlights
- First-team All-Southland Conference (2015)

Career NFL statistics
- Receptions: 2
- Receiving yards: 18
- Stats at Pro Football Reference

Cole Wick (born November 30, 1993) is an American former professional football player who was a tight end in the National Football League (NFL). He played college football for the Incarnate Word Cardinals.

== Early life ==
Wick is from Hallettsville, Texas. He played high school football at Sacred Heart Catholic High.

== College career ==
=== Statistics ===
Year	Team	Rec	Yards	Avg	Long	Rec TDs
2012	Incarnate Word	0	0	0.0	0	0
2013	Incarnate Word	11	118	10.7	21	1
2014	Incarnate Word	20	350	17.5	39	2
2015	Incarnate Word	30	364	12.1	26	2
College totals		61	832	13.6	39	5

== Professional career ==
=== Detroit Lions ===
Wick went undrafted in the 2016 NFL draft. He had free agent offers from the Carolina Panthers and Oakland Raiders before signing with the Detroit Lions. Along with Myke Tavarres, who signed with the Philadelphia Eagles, Wick was the first Incarnate Word football player to make an NFL roster. On September 11, in the season opener against the Indianapolis Colts, Wick recorded his first career reception for five yards in his NFL debut. His rookie season came to an early end after suffering a knee injury. He was placed on injured reserve on November 1, 2016.

On September 2, 2017, Wick was waived by the Lions and was signed to the practice squad the next day. He was released by the team on September 6, 2017.

=== San Francisco 49ers ===
On October 18, 2017, Wick was signed to the San Francisco 49ers' practice squad. He signed a reserve/future contract with the 49ers on January 2, 2018.

On October 16, 2018, Wick was waived by the 49ers and was re-signed to the practice squad.

=== Tennessee Titans ===
On December 11, 2018, Wick was signed by the Tennessee Titans off the 49ers practice squad after the injury of Jonnu Smith. He was placed on injured reserve on December 24, 2018.

On August 28, 2019, Wick was waived by the Titans.

In October 2019, Wick was selected by the Tampa Bay Vipers in the 2020 XFL draft.

=== Oakland Raiders ===
On December 4, 2019, Wick was signed to the Oakland Raiders practice squad. He was released on December 11.

=== New Orleans Saints ===
On December 27, 2019, Wick was signed to the New Orleans Saints practice squad. He signed a reserve/future contract with the Saints on January 7, 2020. On July 28, 2020, Wick announced he was opting out of the 2020 season due to the COVID-19 pandemic. He was waived after the season on February 12, 2021.
