= 2016 Oklahoma Panhandle State Aggies football team =

American college football season

2016 Oklahoma Panhandle State Aggies football
- Conference: Lone Star Conference
- Record: 2–9 (1–8 LSC)
- Head coach: Russell Gaskamp (5th season)
- Offensive coordinator: Buddy Blevins (1st season)
- Offensive scheme: Spread
- Defensive coordinator: Eric Daniels (1st season)
- Base defense: Multiple
- Home stadium: Carl Wooten Field

2016 Lone Star Conference football standings
	Conf.			Overall
Team	W		L	W		L
No. 9 Texas A&M–Commerce $^	8	–	1	10	–	2
No. 24 Midwestern State ^	7	–	2	8	–	3
Texas A&M–Kingsville #	6	–	3	9	–	3
Eastern New Mexico #	6	–	3	7	–	5
West Texas A&M	5	–	4	6	–	5
Tarleton State	5	–	4	5	–	6
Angelo State	4	–	5	5	–	6
Western New Mexico	3	–	6	3	–	8
Oklahoma Panhandle State	1	–	8	2	–	9
UT Permian Basin	0	–	9	2	–	9
$ – Conference champion; ^ – NCAA Division II playoff participant; # – bowl participant (Texas A&M–Kingsville - Live United Texarkana Bowl, Eastern New Mexico - C.H.A.M.P.S. Heart of Texas Bowl); Rankings from AFCA poll

The 2016 Oklahoma Panhandle State Aggies football team represented Oklahoma Panhandle State University during the 2016 NCAA Division II football season as an affiliate member of the Lone Star Conference (LSC). The Aggies were led by fifth-year head coach Russell Gaskamp.

This was the Aggies' final season competing in the NCAA as the program would return to the NAIA for the 2017 season.

== Preseason ==
=== LSC media poll ===
The LSC preseason media poll was released on August 8, 2016. The Aggies were predicted to finish eighth in the conference.

== Schedule ==
Date	Time	Opponent	Site	TV	Result	Attendance
September 3	6:00 p.m.	at No. 2 (FCS) Sam Houston State*	Bowers Stadium; Huntsville, TX	ESPN3	L 21–59	8,609
September 10	6:00 p.m.	at Arkansas–Pine Bluff*	Golden Lion Stadium; Pine Bluff, AR		W 20–16	5,668
September 17	12:00 p.m.	at Western New Mexico	Ben Altamirano Field; Silver City, NM		L 21–44	375
September 24	7:00 p.m.	at No. 11 Midwestern State	Memorial Stadium; Wichita Falls, TX		L 24–42	8,397
October 1	1:00 p.m.	No. 6 Texas A&M–Commerce	Carl Wooten Field; Goodwell, OK		L 13–35	1,330
October 8	6:00 p.m.	at Angelo State	LeGrand Sports Complex; San Angelo, TX		L 9–31	3,614
October 15	1:00 p.m.	West Texas A&M^{†}	Carl Wooten Field; Goodwell, OK		L 14–42	1,500
October 22	7:00 p.m.	at UT Permian Basin	Grande Communications Stadium; Midland, TX		W 54–44	7,965
October 29	1:00 p.m.	Tarleton State	Carl Wooten Field; Goodwell, OK		L 26–45	750
November 5	5:15 p.m.	at Eastern New Mexico	Greyhound Stadium; Portales, NM		L 10–53	439
November 12	1:00 p.m.	Texas A&M–Kingsville	Carl Wooten Field; Goodwell, OK		L 39–53	375
*Non-conference game; ^{†}Homecoming; Rankings from AFCA Poll released prior to the game; All times are in Central time

== Roster ==
2016 Oklahoma Panhandle State Aggies football team roster
Players
Coaches
Offense

Pos.	#	Name	Class
WR	1	Andrew Hernandez	Sr
QB	2	D. J. Scott	Fr
RB	3	Cedric Agyeman	Jr
WR	4	Eddie Thomas IV	So
TE	5	J. B. Frontz	Sr
WR	8	Devyn Williams	Jr
WR	10	Steven White Jr.	Jr
QB	11	Hayden Cooper	Fr
QB	12	Shane Truelove	Sr
QB	18	Travis Taylor	Fr
RB	24	Rod Moore	Sr
RB	26	Xavier Jones	Jr
RB	35	Beau Avila	Sr
RB	37	Zakerrius Walker	Fr
RB	38	Austin Luna	Fr
TE	46	Axel Rogue	Fr
TE	48	Walker Vinson	Jr
OL	52	Guerrero Garcia	Sr
OL	60	Romario Martinez	Fr
OL	66	Chad Hickson	Fr
OL	69	Mason Williams	Sr
OL	70	Allston Hadley	Sr
OL	71	Cullen Oliver	Jr
OL	72	Samuel Lemin	Jr
OL	73	Diego Arenas	Sr
OL	74	Matthew Granz	Jr
OL	75	Jakob Popple	Jr
OL	76	Jamil Dollarson	Jr
OL	77	Dominique Coutee-Thomas	Jr
OL	79	Carlos Lopez	Fr
WR	80	Russell Gray	Fr
WR	81	Nate Knitig	Fr
WR	83	Dawson Stephens	Sr
WR	84	Brandon Trotter	Sr
WR	85	Miquel Hudson	Fr
TE	86	Tanner Riden	Fr
TE	87	Kamerone' Wheeler	Jr
WR	88	Dorion Barnett	Jr
RB		Kaujual Anderson	Fr
WR		Draven Cantly	Fr
WR		Braylon Chandler	So
WR		D. J. Coursey	So
RB		George Dominguez	Fr
RB		Joshua Gordon	Fr
WR		Christian Green	Fr
QB		Beau Jinkens	Fr
WR		Demyjae Jones	Fr
TE		Lester	Jr
OL		Waylon Loftis	Fr
OL		Colton Luster	Fr
WR		Jake Martinez	Fr
RB		Terell Miles	Jr
RB		Justin Milligan	Fr
TE		Kyler Musgrave	So
OL		Caleb Patrick	Fr
QB		John Polston	Fr
QB		Brandon Ramon	So
OL		Tanner Renken	Fr
OL		John Rodriguez	Fr
WR		Cooper Savage	Fr
OL		Dakota Weir	Jr

Defense

Pos.	#	Name	Class
CB	7	Shecari Johnson	Jr
DB	12	Troy Smith	Fr
CB	14	Nick Shields	Jr
DB	15	Dejon Jeffery	Fr
DB	16	Marcus Jones	Fr
DB	17	Jermaine Wright	Jr
DB	21	Olen Brown	Jr
DB	22	Colton Thompson	Fr
DB	25	Darryn Cain	Fr
CB	27	Jeric Mitchell	Jr
CB	28	Marcus McCants	Jr
LB	29	Royce Asi	Sr
DB	30	Chad Ellis	Fr
DB	31	Byron Edwards	So
LB	34	Linden Robertson	Jr
LB	39	Tyrek Domio	Fr
LB	40	Jawan Purifoy	So
LB	42	Neptune Joseph	Sr
LB	43	Dharius Timmons	Fr
LB	44	Jasper Smiley	Fr
LB	45	Brandon Gipe	Sr
LB	47	D'Darrin Primes	So
LB	49	Dominick Bell	Sr
DL	50	Cortney Stinnett	Sr
DL	51	Lajarius Anthony	Fr
LB	53	Oscar Salinas	Fr
DL	55	Osvaldo Gutierrez	Jr
DL	56	Nate Leota	Sr
LB	58	Khalid Taylor	Fr
LB	59	Nathan Leithead	Fr
DL	61	Zachary Perez-Clack	Jr
DL	89	Jabrel Alexander	Jr
DL	90	Jimmie Pace Jr.	So
LB	91	Sean Williams	Fr
DL	92	Kameron Lyons	Jr
DL	94	Sequoia Smith	So
LB	96	Brandon Julian	Fr
DL	97	Charles Stone Jr.	Jr
DL	98	Keandre' Johnson	Fr
DL	99	John Pitts	Sr
DL		Jordan Barrs	Fr
DB		Warren Dillon III	Fr
LB		SirDarren Duncan	Fr
DB		De'Adryelle Fites	Fr
LB		Garrett Gaskamp	Jr
DB		Charles Grant II	So
DB		Desmond Jackson	So
LB		Adrian Johnson	Fr
DB		Kenzey Lopez	Fr
DL		Nathan Mandani	Fr
LB		Melquan Primes	So
LB		Davion Smith	So
DB		Reuben Thompson	Jr

Special teams

Pos.	#	Name	Class
K, P	5	Sterling Claphan	Fr
P, K	9	Jacob Test	So

Head coach

- Russell Gaskamp
  Head coach/Offensive line

Coordinators/assistant coaches

- Eric Daniels
  Assistant head coach/Defensive coordinator/Linebackers
- Buddy Blevins
  Offensive coordinator/Wide receivers
- Le'Marcus Gibson
  Defensive backs
- Travis Champion
  Quarterbacks/Running backs

Legend

- (C) Team captain
- (S) Suspended
- (I) Ineligible
- Injured
- Redshirt

Roster
Last update: June 12, 2024

== Game summaries ==
=== At No. 2 (FCS) Sam Houston State ===
	1	2	3	4	Total
Aggies	14	0	0	7	21
No. 2 (FCS) Bearkats	21	17	7	14	59

Statistics	OPSU	SHSU
First downs	15	29
Total yards	366	668
Rushing yards	55	279
Passing yards	311	389
Turnovers	0	1
Time of possession	31:47	28:13

Team	Category	Player	Statistics
Oklahoma Panhandle State	Passing	Shane Truelove	17/27, 219 yards, TD
Oklahoma Panhandle State	Rushing	Rod Moore	15 rushes, 29 yards
Oklahoma Panhandle State	Receiving	Andrew Hernandez	7 receptions, 133 yards, 2 TD
Sam Houston State	Passing	Jeremi Briscoe	26/39, 338 yards, 3 TD
Sam Houston State	Rushing	Corey Avery	13 rushes, 70 yards, TD
Sam Houston State	Receiving	Derrick Dick	3 receptions, 72 yards

=== At Arkansas–Pine Bluff ===
	1	2	3	4	Total
Aggies	0	7	0	13	20
Golden Lions	3	0	13	0	16

Statistics	OPSU	UAPB
First downs	20	21
Total yards	343	343
Rushing yards	115	140
Passing yards	228	203
Turnovers	0	1
Time of possession	24:48	35:12

Team	Category	Player	Statistics
Oklahoma Panhandle State	Passing	Shane Truelove	22/34, 228 yards, 3 TD
Oklahoma Panhandle State	Rushing	Cedric Agyeman	14 rushes, 73 yards
Oklahoma Panhandle State	Receiving	Brandon Trotter	6 receptions, 93 yards, TD
Arkansas–Pine Bluff	Passing	Brandon Duncan	27/38, 203 yards
Arkansas–Pine Bluff	Rushing	Dante McDonald	20 rushes, 122 yards, TD
Arkansas–Pine Bluff	Receiving	Cody Swain	10 receptions, 72 yards

=== At Western New Mexico ===
	1	2	3	4	Total
Aggies	7	7	7	0	21
Mustangs	9	28	0	7	44

Statistics	OPSU	WNMU
First downs	21	22
Total yards	438	461
Rushing yards	186	178
Passing yards	252	283
Turnovers	3	0
Time of possession	28:20	31:40

Team	Category	Player	Statistics
Oklahoma Panhandle State	Passing	Shane Truelove	15/31, 200 yards, TD, INT
Oklahoma Panhandle State	Rushing	Rod Moore	15 rushes, 106 yards
Oklahoma Panhandle State	Receiving	Eddie Thomas IV	3 receptions, 81 yards, TD
Western New Mexico	Passing	Javia Hall	17/25, 249 yards, 4 TD
Western New Mexico	Rushing	Javia Hall	13 rushes, 62 yards, 2 TD
Western New Mexico	Receiving	Xavier Ayers	5 receptions, 118 yards, 2 TD

=== At No. 11 Midwestern State ===
	1	2	3	4	Total
Aggies	7	14	3	0	24
No. 11 Mustangs	21	0	7	14	42

Statistics	OPSU	MSU
First downs	23	19
Total yards	446	467
Rushing yards	164	218
Passing yards	282	249
Turnovers	3	0
Time of possession	28:04	31:56

Team	Category	Player	Statistics
Oklahoma Panhandle State	Passing	Shane Truelove	25/41, 282 yards, 2 TD, 3 INT
Oklahoma Panhandle State	Rushing	Rod Moore	23 rushes, 133 yards, TD
Oklahoma Panhandle State	Receiving	Eddie Thomas IV	6 receptions, 57 yards, TD
Midwestern State	Passing	Quade Coward	16/23, 235 yards, 2 TD
Midwestern State	Rushing	Adrian Seales	17 rushes, 103 yards, TD
Midwestern State	Receiving	Statron Jones	3 receptions, 84 yards, TD

About 30 minutes after kickoff the game was postponed to the following day due to lightning and heavy rainfall in the area.

=== No. 6 Texas A&M–Commerce ===
	1	2	3	4	Total
No. 6 Lions	14	21	0	0	35
Aggies	0	0	7	6	13

Statistics	TAMUC	OPSU
First downs	24	16
Total yards	561	262
Rushing yards	134	54
Passing yards	427	208
Turnovers	4	1
Time of possession	28:37	31:23

Team	Category	Player	Statistics
Texas A&M–Commerce	Passing	Luis Perez	34/48, 396 yards, 3 TD, INT
Texas A&M–Commerce	Rushing	Ovie Urevbu	4 rushes, 64 yards
Texas A&M–Commerce	Receiving	Lance Evans	7 receptions, 110 yards, 2 TD
Oklahoma Panhandle State	Passing	Shane Truelove	19/27, 161 yards, INT
Oklahoma Panhandle State	Rushing	Rod Moore	18 rushes, 60 yards, TD
Oklahoma Panhandle State	Receiving	Devyn Williams	5 receptions, 55 yards

=== At Angelo State ===
	1	2	3	4	Total
Aggies	0	3	0	6	9
Rams	0	10	7	14	31

Statistics	OPSU	ASU
First downs	18	22
Total yards	276	410
Rushing yards	42	263
Passing yards	234	147
Turnovers	2	3
Time of possession	31:23	28:37

Team	Category	Player	Statistics
Oklahoma Panhandle State	Passing	Shane Truelove	26/46, 234 yards, TD, INT
Oklahoma Panhandle State	Rushing	Xavier Jones	14 rushes, 57 yards
Oklahoma Panhandle State	Receiving	Steven White Jr.	3 receptions, 55 yards
Angelo State	Passing	Carsen Cook	16/33, 147 yards, 2 TD, 3 INT
Angelo State	Rushing	Josh Stevens	15 rushes, 131 yards, TD
Angelo State	Receiving	Lawson Ayo	7 receptions, 60 yards, TD

=== West Texas A&M ===
	1	2	3	4	Total
Buffaloes	7	14	7	14	42
Aggies	0	7	7	0	14

Statistics	WT	OPSU
First downs	24	24
Total yards	409	396
Rushing yards	117	157
Passing yards	292	239
Turnovers	1	2
Time of possession	30:29	29:31

Team	Category	Player	Statistics
West Texas A&M	Passing	Ben Arbuckle	30/42, 292 yards, 6 TD
West Texas A&M	Rushing	Devon Paye	15 rushes, 80 yards
West Texas A&M	Receiving	Junior Pomee	11 receptions, 124 yards, 4 TD
Oklahoma Panhandle State	Passing	Shane Truelove	19/34, 218 yards, 2 TD
Oklahoma Panhandle State	Rushing	Xavier Jones	10 rushes, 61 yards
Oklahoma Panhandle State	Receiving	Devyn Williams	5 receptions, 78 yards

=== At UT Permian Basin ===
	1	2	3	4	Total
Aggies	21	0	14	19	54
Falcons	13	7	3	21	44

Statistics	OPSU	UTPB
First downs	33	31
Total yards	750	523
Rushing yards	140	201
Passing yards	610	322
Turnovers	0	2
Time of possession	30:24	29:36

Team	Category	Player	Statistics
Oklahoma Panhandle State	Passing	Shane Truelove	40/49, 610 yards, 4 TD
Oklahoma Panhandle State	Rushing	Rod Moore	16 rushes, 88 yards, 2 TD
Oklahoma Panhandle State	Receiving	Devyn Williams	10 receptions, 223 yards, 2 TD
UT Permian Basin	Passing	Kameron Mathis	27/49, 322 yards, 4 TD, 2 INT
UT Permian Basin	Rushing	Jordan Williams	15 rushes, 78 yards
UT Permian Basin	Receiving	Terrell Davidson	8 receptions, 85 yards

=== Tarleton State ===
	1	2	3	4	Total
Texans	10	7	7	21	45
Aggies	3	10	6	7	26

Statistics	TSU	OPSU
First downs	21	23
Total yards	466	390
Rushing yards	63	62
Passing yards	403	328
Turnovers	3	3
Time of possession	29:16	30:44

Team	Category	Player	Statistics
Tarleton State	Passing	Zed Woerner	14/25, 246 yards, 2 TD, 3 INT
Tarleton State	Rushing	Jabari Anderson	7 rushes, 43 yards, TD
Tarleton State	Receiving	Del'Michael High	9 receptions, 126 yards
Oklahoma Panhandle State	Passing	Shane Truelove	29/52, 328 yards, 2 INT
Oklahoma Panhandle State	Rushing	Rod Moore	12 rushes, 47 yards, TD
Oklahoma Panhandle State	Receiving	Rod Moore	6 receptions, 80 yards

=== At Eastern New Mexico ===
	1	2	3	4	Total
Aggies	0	3	7	0	10
Greyhounds	13	13	13	14	53

Statistics	OPSU	ENMU
First downs	16	28
Total yards	283	645
Rushing yards	166	482
Passing yards	117	163
Turnovers	3	1
Time of possession	28:39	31:21

Team	Category	Player	Statistics
Oklahoma Panhandle State	Passing	Shane Truelove	17/29, 117 yards, TD, 2 INT
Oklahoma Panhandle State	Rushing	Xavier Jones	5 rushes, 53 yards
Oklahoma Panhandle State	Receiving	Devyn Williams	8 receptions, 64 yards
Eastern New Mexico	Passing	Wyatt Strand	5/10, 163 yards, 3 TD, INT
Eastern New Mexico	Rushing	Kamal Cass	16 rushes, 154 yards, 2 TD
Eastern New Mexico	Receiving	Larry Baker-Bruce	4 receptions, 132 yards, 3 TD

=== Texas A&M–Kingsville ===
	1	2	3	4	Total
Javelinas	14	23	16	0	53
Aggies	10	7	0	22	39

Statistics	TAMUK	OPSU
First downs	28	21
Total yards	484	464
Rushing yards	251	54
Passing yards	233	410
Turnovers	0	3
Time of possession	36:46	23:14

Team	Category	Player	Statistics
Texas A&M–Kingsville	Passing	Myles Carr	15/23, 178 yards, 2 TD
Texas A&M–Kingsville	Rushing	Nick Pelrean	12 rushes, 103 yards, 2 TD
Texas A&M–Kingsville	Receiving	Stehly Reden	4 receptions, 78 yards
Oklahoma Panhandle State	Passing	Shane Truelove	20/30, 325 yards, 4 TD, 2 INT
Oklahoma Panhandle State	Rushing	Rod Moore	11 rushes, 34 yards
Oklahoma Panhandle State	Receiving	Brandon Trotter	5 receptions, 103 yards, TD
