= 2016 Texas A&M–Commerce Lions football team =

American college football season

2016 Texas A&M–Commerce Lions football

LSC champion

NCAA Division II Second Round, L 32–55 vs. Grand Valley State
- Conference: Lone Star Conference

Ranking
- AFCA: No. 9
- Record: 11–2 (8–1 LSC)
- Head coach: Colby Carthel (4th season)
- Offensive coordinator: Matt Storm (4th season)
- Co-offensive coordinator: Jared May (4th season)
- Offensive scheme: Spread
- Defensive coordinator: Justin Deason (4th season)
- Base defense: 3–4
- Home stadium: Memorial Stadium

2016 Lone Star Conference football standings
	Conf.			Overall
Team	W		L	W		L
No. 9 Texas A&M–Commerce $^	8	–	1	10	–	2
No. 24 Midwestern State ^	7	–	2	8	–	3
Texas A&M–Kingsville #	6	–	3	9	–	3
Eastern New Mexico #	6	–	3	7	–	5
West Texas A&M	5	–	4	6	–	5
Tarleton State	5	–	4	5	–	6
Angelo State	4	–	5	5	–	6
Western New Mexico	3	–	6	3	–	8
Oklahoma Panhandle State	1	–	8	2	–	9
UT Permian Basin	0	–	9	2	–	9
$ – Conference champion; ^ – NCAA Division II playoff participant; # – bowl participant (Texas A&M–Kingsville - Live United Texarkana Bowl, Eastern New Mexico - C.H.A.M.P.S. Heart of Texas Bowl); Rankings from AFCA poll

The 2016 Texas A&M–Commerce Lions football team represented Texas A&M University–Commerce as a member of the Lone Star Conference (LSC) during the 2016 NCAA Division II football season. Led by fourth-year head coach Colby Carthel, the Lions compiled an overall record of 11–2 with a mark of 8–1 in conference play, winning the LSC title for the third consecutive season. Texas A&M–Commerce advanced to the NCAA Division II Football Championship playoffs for the fifth time in program history. In the first round, the Lions defeated Colorado Mesa, 34–23, for the program's first playoff win since 1991, but lost to the Grand Valley State, 55–32, in the second round. The Lions were ranked No. 9 in the final AFCA poll.

Texas A&M–Commerce finished with both the top offense and top defense in the conference. The Lions scored a total of 477 points (39.8 per game) while only allowing 260 (21.7 per game). On offense, the team was led by junior quarterback Luis Perez, who finished the season throwing for 3,326 yards, 32 touchdowns, and five interceptions.

The Lions played their home games at Memorial Stadium on the university's campus in Commerce, Texas.

== Preseason ==
=== LSC media poll ===
The LSC media poll was released on August 8, 2016. The Lions were predicted to finish first, receiving 19 of the 28 first place votes.

== Schedule ==
Date	Time	Opponent	Rank	Site	TV	Result	Attendance
September 1	7:00 p.m	University of Faith (FL)*	No. 9	Memorial Stadium; Commerce, TX		W 62–0	6,855
September 10	6:00 p.m	at Delta State*	No. 8	McCool Stadium; Cleveland, MS		W 40–28	5,679
September 17	2:00 p.m.	at Eastern New Mexico	No. 7	Greyhound Stadium; Portales, NM		W 49–10	1,510
September 24	7:00 p.m.	Texas A&M–Kingsville	No. 6	Memorial Stadium; Commerce, TX (Chennault Cup)		W 38–36	7,747
October 1	1:00 p.m.	at Oklahoma Panhandle State	No. 6	Carl Wooten Field; Goodwell, OK		W 35–13	1,330
October 8	7:00 p.m.	No. 7 Midwestern State	No. 4	Memorial Stadium; Commerce, TX	ESPN3	L 25–26	9,208
October 15	1:00 p.m.	at Western New Mexico	No. 9	Altamirano Stadium; Silver City, NM		W 38–24	279
October 22	6:00 p.m.	at Angelo State	No. 9	LeGrand Sports Complex; San Angelo, TX		W 62–14	3,406
October 29	4:00 p.m.	West Texas A&M^{†}	No. 8	Memorial Stadium; Commerce, TX (East Texas vs. West Texas)		W 36–0	9,629
November 5	7:00 p.m.	at Texas–Permian Basin	No. 8	Ratliff Stadium; Odessa, Texas		W 58–21	7,000
November 12	4:00 p.m.	Tarleton State	No. 8	Memorial Stadium; Commerce, TX (President's Cup)		W 30–10	7,795
November 19	2:00 p.m.	No. 25 Colorado Mesa*	No. 8	Memorial Stadium; Commerce, TX (NCAA Division II First Round)		W 34–23	5,529
November 26	12:00 p.m.	at No. 2 Grand Valley State*	No. 8	Lubbers Stadium; Allendale, MI (NCAA Division II Second Round)	ESPN3	L 32–55	3,081
*Non-conference game; ^{†}Homecoming; Rankings from AFCA Poll released prior to the game; All times are in Central time

== Personnel ==
2016 Texas A&M–Commerce Lions football team roster
Players
Coaches
Offense

Pos.	#	Name	Class
WR		Kenneth Adams	Fr
WR		Kareem Adeniyi	Fr
OL	56	Jon Aguilar	Jr
OL	65	Jonah Brown	Fr
QB	12	Jared Cate	Sr
TE	26	Chris Chumley	Sr
OL		Ty Cole	Fr
RB	23	Richard Cooper	Sr
WR	7	D'Arthur Cowan	Jr
OL		Austin Davies	Fr
OL	71	Malik Ellis	So
WR	3	Lance Evans	Sr
WR	85	Isaiah Guillory	Fr
RB		Carandal Hale	Fr
OL	75	Lane Hasse	Fr
OL	78	Jer'Rick Hawkins	Sr
OL		Christian Hernandez	Fr
TE	15	Vincent Hobbs	So
OL	66	Ken Holmes	Fr
WR	5	Shawn Hooks	Jr
RB	38	Jamel James	So
WR	87	Calvin Jones	Jr
TE	81	Austin Jordan	Jr
TE		Coleton Lasseter	Fr
RB		Antonio Leali'ie'e	Fr
WR	86	Chochy Lucas	So
WR	83	Hitachi Lydia	So
OL	74	Jared Macharro	Jr
WR	13	Hayden Marsh	Sr
OL		Kendall Mathis	Fr
WR		SaDavion Matthews	Fr
WR		Anthony Means	Fr
QB		Luke Medlin	Fr
TE	82	Jacob Norton	So
OL	76	Jason Osei	Sr
QB	18	Chase Pemberton	So
QB	12	Luis Perez	Jr
OL	73	Ryan Peschka	Fr
OL	63	Avery Poates	Sr
OL	68	Christian Rodriguez	Sr
QB	16	Gabriel Rodriguez	Jr
OL	70	Abdul Shammaa	Fr
OL		Amon Simon	Fr
RB	39	Tristen Slaughter	So
TE		Corey Smallwood	Fr
WR	10	Darby Smith	Sr
RB		JaQuorius Smith	Fr
OL	77	Jordan Smith	So
WR		Kelan Smith	Fr
OL	72	Brian Taylor	Fr
WR	8	Metrelle Taylor	So
TE	80	John Thomas	Sr
OL	79	Poet Thomas	Jr
RB	35	Ovie Urevbu	Jr
WR		D. K. Ward	Fr
RB	29	Kaylon Watson	Jr
OL		Jackson Webb	Fr
QB	14	Preston Wheeler	Fr
RB	32	Richard Whitaker	Jr
WR	88	Kalen Winkler	Jr

Defense

Pos.	#	Name	Class
DL	93	Anthony Ameperosa	Jr
DB	17	Steven Baker	Jr
LB	33	Neema Behbahani	Fr
DB		Jay Bias	Fr
LB	54	Garrett Blubaugh	Fr
LB	1	Hatari Byrd	Sr
LB	58	Kieston Carter	Jr
DL		David Chaisson	Fr
DB	84	Randel Clark	Jr
DL		Cole Cleveland	Fr
DB	50	Mason Copeland	Fr
LB	41	Myles Curl	Sr
DB		Derek Davis	Fr
DL		Elijah Earls	Fr
DB	46	Jalon Edwards-Cooper	Fr
DL	11	Tavita Faaiu	Sr
DL		Steven Field	Fr
DB		Isaiah Fields	Fr
DB		Rashad Fisher	Fr
DL	49	D. D. Fletcher	Fr
DB		Drake Flores	Fr
DB		A. J. Forrester	Fr
LB	20	Eric Harrell	Jr
DB	2	Uriah Harris	Sr
LB		Brazos Hesskew	Fr
DL		Andrew Hlavinka	Fr
DL		Jaylon Hodge	Fr
DB	6	Danny Huckaby	So
DB	34	Traven Johnson	Sr
DL	94	Daniel Kanu	So
DB	25	Reggie Kincade	So
DB		Kader Kohou	Fr
LB	53	Christopher Laskowski	Jr
DL	96	Demondre Lauderdale	Fr
DL	97	Devonta Leary	Jr
DL	55	Pierre Leonard	Fr
LB		Joshua Lucas	Fr
LB	57	Addison Mahana	Fr
LB	60	James Marshall	Fr
LB	44	B. J. Mills	Sr
LB		Xavier Morris	Fr
DL		Oshea Murphy	Fr
DL	99	Michael Onuoha	So
DB	27	Trey Porter	Jr
DL		Matthew Price	Fr
DB		Dominique Ramsey	Fr
DL	51	Josh Reynolds	So
LB	43	Cameron Rogers	Sr
LB	9	Brucks Saathoff	So
DL	59	Adam Sagapolu	Jr
DL	95	Kade Satterwhite	Fr
DL	52	Peyton Searcy	So
DL		Kybrin Sheridan	Fr
DB		Alex Shillow	Fr
DB	37	Anthony Smith	Jr
DB	24	Chris Smith	So
DB	21	Yusef Sterling-Lowe	Jr
LB		Kendall Stovall	Fr
DB		Stadrian Taylor	Fr
DL		D. J. Thomas	Fr
DB		Darryl Thomas	Fr
DL	90	Peyton Thorne	So
LB	31	Deondre Toler	Jr
LB	45	Jordan Trim	Fr
DL		Tyler Villegas	Fr
DB	47	Brent Walker	So
DL	36	Michael Wallace	So
DL	98	Jeremiah Walters	Sr
DB		Armando Washington	Fr
DB	42	Kendrick Welsh	Fr
DB	28	Mark Westbrook	Fr
DB	22	Darent White	So
DB		Haden Willis	Fr

Special teams

Pos.	#	Name	Class
K, P	48	Hector Dominguez	Sr
K, P	64	Ryan Guevara	Fr
LS	61	Alec Huntley	Fr
K	40	Tanner Lange	Fr
K	89	Kristov Martinez	So
K		Jake Viquez	Fr

Head coach

- Colby Carthel

Coordinators/assistant coaches

- Matt Storm
  Offensive coordinator
- Jared May
  Co-offensive coordinator/Quarterbacks
- Justin Deason
  Defensive coordinator
- Tim Bleil
  Running backs
- Michael Conrad
  Linebackers
- Desmund Ferris
  Offensive line
- Caid Faske
  Defensive line
- Yogi Gallegos
  Wide receivers
- Darren Garrigan
  Secondary
- Dillon Jordan
  Assistant offensive line
- Andy Townsend
  Outside linebackers
- Scotty Yates
  Inside linebackers
- Collin Gholston
  Safeties
- Randall Fannin
  Safeties
- Don Carthel
  Special teams
- Malcolm Kelly
  Wide receivers
- Tyran Evans
  Defensive line
- Dawson Lake
  Quarterbacks

Legend

- (C) Team captain
- (S) Suspended
- (I) Ineligible
- Injured
- Redshirt

Roster
Last update: October 26, 2022

== Game summaries ==
=== University of Faith (FL) ===
University of Faith Glory Eagles at No. 9 Texas A&M–Commerce Lions – Game summary

Quarter	1	2	3	4	Total
Glory Eagles	0	0	0	0	0
No. 9 Lions	31	24	7	0	62

at Memorial Stadium, Commerce, Texas

- Date: September 1
- Game time: 7:00 p.m. CDT
- Game attendance: 6,855
- Box score, Recap

Game information
First quarter
- TAMUC – Richard Cooper 1-yard run (Kristov Martinez kick), 14:01. Lions 7–0. Drive: 3 plays, 61 yards, 0:59.
- TAMUC – Lance Evans 7-yard pass from Luis Perez (Kristov Martinez kick), 11:47. Lions 14–0. Drive: 2 plays, 10 yards, 0:35.
- TAMUC – Tristen Slaughter 1-yard run (Kristov Martinez kick), 8:31. Lions 21–0. Drive: 6 plays, 54 yards, 1:32.
- TAMUC – Tristen Slaughter 8-yard run (Kristov Martinez kick), 6:22. Lions 28–0. Drive: 3 plays, 37 yards, 1:26.
- TAMUC – Kristov Martinez 32-yard field goal, 0:35. Lions 31–0. Drive: 6 plays, 33 yards, 2:34.

Second quarter

- TAMUC – Tristen Slaughter 5-yard run (Kristov Martinez kick), 10:00. Lions 38–0. Drive: 9 plays, 50 yards, 5:00.
- TAMUC – Kristov Martinez 37-yard field goal, 5:13. Lions 41–0. Drive: 6 plays, 41 yards, 2:31.
- TAMUC – Richard Whitaker 16-yard run (Kristov Martinez kick), 4:00. Lions 48–0. Drive: 1 play, 16 yards, 0:06.
- TAMUC – Buck Wilson 17-yard pass from Jared Cate (Kristov Martinez kick), 0:03. Lions 55–0. Drive: 6 plays, 53 yards, 1:22.

Third quarter

- TAMUC – Justice Luce 55-yard pass from Jared Cate (Ryan Guevara kick), 4:00. Lions 62–0. Drive: 6 plays, 65 yards, 2:48.

Fourth quarter

- No scoring plays

Statistics

Statistics	FAITH	TAMUC
First downs	9	25
Total yards	123	422
Rushing yards	9	238
Passing yards	114	184
Turnovers	2	0
Time of possession	34:31	25:29

Team	Category	Player	Statistics
University of Faith	Passing	D. J. Grant	8/20, 75 yards
University of Faith	Rushing	Shaq Speights	6 rushes, 19 yards
University of Faith	Receiving	Lidell Golden	3 receptions, 30 yards
Texas A&M–Commerce	Passing	Jared Cate	4/7, 92 yards, 2 TD
Texas A&M–Commerce	Rushing	Tristen Slaughter	14 rushes, 113 yards, 3 TD
Texas A&M–Commerce	Receiving	Justice Luce	3 receptions, 72 yards, TD

=== At Delta State ===
No. 8 Texas A&M–Commerce Lions at Delta State Statesmen – Game summary

Quarter	1	2	3	4	Total
No. 8 Lions	17	7	10	6	40
Statesmen	14	7	0	7	28

at McCool Stadium, Cleveland, Mississippi

- Date: September 10
- Game time: 6:00 p.m. CDT
- Game attendance: 5,679
- Referee: Bradly MacNealy
- Box score, Recap

Game information
First quarter
- TAMUC – Kristov Martinez 38-yard field goal, 11:10. Lions 3–0. Drive: 11 plays, 54 yards, 3:50.
- TAMUC – Richard Cooper 9-yard run (Kristov Martinez kick), 10:02. Lions 10–0. Drive: 1 play, 9 yards, 0:06.
- DSU – Timothy Foy 0-yard fumble return (Cody Mills kick), 8:12. Lions 10–7.
- TAMUC – Richard Cooper 8-yard run (Kristov Martinez kick), 6:38. Lions 17–7. Drive: 4 plays, 46 yards, 1:21.
- DSU – Chris Robinson 1-yard run (Cody Mills kick), 1:39. Lions 17–14. Drive: 12 plays, 75 yards, 4:59.

Second quarter

- DSU – Chris Robinson 2-yard run (Cody Mills kick), 8:45. Statesmen 21–17. Drive: 13 plays, 97 yards, 4:53.
- TAMUC – Lance Evans 66-yard pass from Luis Perez (Kristov Martinez kick), 7:10. Lions 24–21. Drive: 4 plays, 89 yards, 1:25.

Third quarter

- TAMUC – Gabriel Rodriguez 3-yard run (Kristov Martinez kick), 9:38. Lions 31–21. Drive: 7 plays, 88 yards, 2:50.
- TAMUC – Kristov Martinez 35-yard field goal, 0:05. Lions 34–21. Drive: 8 plays, 39 yards, 3:19.

Fourth quarter

- TAMUC – Buck Wilson 15-yard pass from Luis Perez (pass failed), 9:44. Lions 40–21. Drive: 7 plays, 50 yards, 3:40.
- DSU – Timothy Foy 5-yard run (Cody Mills kick), 3:39. Lions 40–28. Drive: 7 plays, 60 yards, 1:36.

Statistics

Statistics	TAMUC	DSU
First downs	22	20
Total yards	471	397
Rushing yards	149	122
Passing yards	322	275
Turnovers	0	3
Time of possession	30:35	29:25

Team	Category	Player	Statistics
Texas A&M–Commerce	Passing	Luis Perez	17/23, 322 yards, 2 TD
Texas A&M–Commerce	Rushing	Richard Cooper	22 rushes, 87 yards, 2 TD
Texas A&M–Commerce	Receiving	Lance Evans	4 receptions, 123 yards, TD
Delta State	Passing	Tyler Sullivan	30/37, 221 yards, 3 INT
Delta State	Rushing	Chris Robinson	16 rushes, 64 yards, 2 TD
Delta State	Receiving	K'Shun Davis	7 receptions, 52 yards

=== At Eastern New Mexico ===
No. 7 Texas A&M–Commerce Lions at Eastern New Mexico Greyhounds

Quarter	1	2	3	4	Total
No. 7 Lions	21	14	7	7	49
Greyhounds	0	0	3	7	10

at Greyhound Stadium, Portales, New Mexico

- Date: September 17
- Game time: 2:00 p.m. CDT / 1:00 p.m. MDT
- Game attendance: 1,510
- Referee: Matt Jones
- Box score, Recap

Game information
First quarter
- TAMUC – Darby Smith 46-yard pass from Luis Perez (Kristov Martinez kick), 13:30. Lions 7–0. Drive: 4 plays, 69 yards, 1:30.
- TAMUC – D'Arthur Cowan 42-yard pass from Luis Perez (Kristov Matinez kick), 10:16. Lions 14–0. Drive: 4 plays, 53 yards, 1:37.
- TAMUC – Justice Luce 29-yard pass from Luis Perez (Kristov Martinez kick), 4:33. Lions 21–0. Drive: 7 plays, 59 yards, 3:05.

Second quarter

- TAMUC – John Thomas 11-yard pass from Luis Perez (Kristov Martinez kick), 14:14. Lions 28–0. Drive: 7 plays, 40 yards, 3:05.
- TAMUC – Lance Evans 35-yard pass from Luis Perez (Kristov Martinez kick), 8:21. Lions 35–0. Drive: 4 plays, 64 yards, 1:38.

Third quarter

- TAMUC – Richard Cooper 13-yard run (Kristov Martinez kick), 8:46. Lions 42–0. Drive: 10 plays, 92 yards, 3:57.
- ENMU – Bailey Hale 37-yard field goal, 2:39. Lions 42–3. Drive: 13 plays, 47 yards, 5:58.

Fourth quarter

- TAMUC – Tristen Slaughter 4-yard run (Bailey Hale kick), 14:19. Lions 49–3. Drive: 7 plays, 49 yards, 3:10.
- ENMU – Paul Terry 27-yard run (Bailey Hale kick), 10:42. Lions 49–10. Drive: 7 plays, 84 yards, 3:28.

Statistics

Statistics	TAMUC	ENMU
First downs	25	19
Total yards	479	287
Rushing yards	101	227
Passing yards	378	60
Turnovers	0	3
Time of possession	24:50	35:10

Team	Category	Player	Statistics
Texas A&M–Commerce	Passing	Luis Perez	24/31, 342 yards, 5 TD
Texas A&M–Commerce	Rushing	Richard Cooper	11 rushes, 64 yards, TD
Texas A&M–Commerce	Receiving	D'Arthur Cowan	6 receptions, 82 yards, TD
Eastern New Mexico	Passing	Adam Lucero	6/9, 63 yards, 2 INT
Eastern New Mexico	Rushing	Kamal Cass	21 rushes, 62 yards
Eastern New Mexico	Receiving	Aaron Johnson	2 receptions, 32 yards

=== Texas A&M–Kingsville ===
Texas A&M–Kingsville Javelinas at No. 6 Texas A&M–Commerce Lions – Game summary

Quarter	1	2	3	4	Total
Javelinas	6	10	14	6	36
No. 6 Lions	10	7	7	14	38

at Memorial Stadium, Commerce, Texas

- Date: September 17
- Game time: 2:00 p.m. CDT
- Game attendance: 7,747
- Referee: Kenny Kelarek
- Box score, Recap

Game information
First quarter
- TAMUK – Julio De la Garza 45-yard field goal, 12:41. Javelians 3–0. Drive: 7 plays, 47 yards, 2:19.
- TAMUC – Richard Cooper 34-yard run (Kristov Martinez kick), 7:47. Lions 7–3. Drive: 3 plays, 41 yards, 0:43.
- TAMUK – Julio De la Garza 29-yard field goal, 2:31. Lions 7–6. Drive: 12 plays, 63 yards, 5:16.
- TAMUC – Kristov Martinez 37-yard field goal, 0:06. Lions 10–6. Drive: 4 plays, 5 yards, 2:14.

Second quarter

- TAMUK – Roe Posada 10-yard pass from Myles Carr (Julio De la Garza kick), 13:35. Javelinas 13–10. Drive: 5 plays, 75 yards, 1:31.
- TAMUK – Julio De la Garza 27-yard field goal, 7:33. Javelinas 16–10. Drive: 9 plays, 18 yards, 4:26.
- TAMUC – Richard Cooper 50-yard run (Kristov Martinez kick), 3:27. Lions 17–16. Drive: 3 plays, 65 yards, 0:53.

Third quarter

- TAMUC – Gabriel Rodriguez 2-yard run (Kristov Martinez kick), 13:28. Lions 24–16. Drive: 4 plays, 72 yards, 1:26.
- TAMUK – Anthony Autry 34-yard pass from Myles Carr (Julio De la Garza kick), 8:01. Lions 24–23. Drive: 6 plays, 73 yards, 2:54.
- TAMUK – Luis Lopez –2-yard run (Julio De la Garza kick), 0:17. Javelinas 30–24. Drive: 8 plays, 85 yards, 3:54.

Fourth quarter

- TAMUC – Darby Smith 52-yard pass from Luis Perez (Kristov Martinez kick), 10:41. Lions 31–30. Drive: 3 plays, 62 yards, 0:22.
- TAMUC – Danny Huckaby 0-yard fumble return (Kristov Martinez kick), 4:27. Lions 38–30.
- TAMUK – Jordan Thomas 89-yard pass from Myles Price (pass failed), 1:26. Lions 38–36. Drive: 2 plays, 99 yards, 0:21.

Statistics

Statistics	TAMUK	TAMUC
First downs	25	11
Total yards	564	350
Rushing yards	188	217
Passing yards	376	133
Turnovers	2	1
Time of possession	37:00	23:00

Team	Category	Player	Statistics
Texas A&M–Kingsville	Passing	Myles Carr	25/40, 376 yards, 3 TD
Texas A&M–Kingsville	Rushing	Nick Pelrean	20 rushes, 75 yards
Texas A&M–Kingsville	Receiving	Jordan Thomas	5 receptions, 152 yards, TD
Texas A&M–Commerce	Passing	Luis Perez	10/19, 133 yards, TD
Texas A&M–Commerce	Rushing	Richard Cooper	19 rushes, 224 yards, 2 TD
Texas A&M–Commerce	Receiving	Darby Smith	4 receptions, 91 yards, TD

=== At Oklahoma Panhandle State ===
No. 6 Texas A&M–Commerce Lions at Oklahoma Panhandle State Aggies – Game summary

Quarter	1	2	3	4	Total
No. 6 Lions	14	21	0	0	35
Aggies	0	0	7	6	13

at Carl Wooten Field, Goodwell, Oklahoma

- Date: October 1
- Game time: 1:00 p.m.
- Game weather: Sunny, 84 °F (29 °C)
- Game attendance: 1,330
- Referee: Andy Dunklin
- Box score, Recap

Game information
First quarter
- TAMUC – Lance Evans 53-yard pass from Luis Perez (Kristov Martinez kick), 12:57. Lions 7–0. Drive: 6 plays, 75 yards, 2:03.
- TAMUC – Richard Cooper 5-yard run (Kristov Martinez kick), 7:55. Lions 14–0. Drive: 8 plays, 80 yards, 2:37.

Second quarter

- TAMUC – D'Arthur Cowan 6-yard pass from Luis Perez (Kristov Martinez kick), 14:16. Lions 21–0. Drive: 11 plays, 85 yards, 5:09.
- TAMUC – Lance Evans 20-yard pass from Luis Perez (Kristov Martinez kick), 6:29. Lions 28–0. Drive: 6 plays, 55 yards, 2:07.
- TAMUC – Ovie Urevbu 28-yard pass from Jared Cate (Kristov Martinez kick), 3:02. Lions 35–0. Drive: 8 plays, 68 yards, 1:49.

Third quarter

- OPSU – Rod Moore 1-yard run (Sterling Claphan kick), 11:22. Lions 35–7. Drive: 10 plays, 37 yards, 3:27.

Fourth quarter

- OPSU – Brandon Trotter 39-yard pass from D. J. Scott (kick failed), 4:25. Lions 35–13. Drive: 6 plays, 46 yards, 2:36.

Statistics

Statistics	TAMUC	OPSU
First downs	24	16
Total yards	561	262
Rushing yards	134	54
Passing yards	427	208
Turnovers	4	1
Time of possession	28:37	31:23

Team	Category	Player	Statistics
Texas A&M–Commerce	Passing	Luis Perez	34/48, 396 yards, 3 TD, INT
Texas A&M–Commerce	Rushing	Ovie Urevbu	4 rushes, 64 yards
Texas A&M–Commerce	Receiving	Lance Evans	7 receptions, 110 yards, 2 TD
Oklahoma Panhandle State	Passing	Shane Truelove	19/27, 161 yards, INT
Oklahoma Panhandle State	Rushing	Rod Moore	18 rushes, 60 yards, TD
Oklahoma Panhandle State	Receiving	Devyn Williams	5 receptions, 55 yards

=== No. 7 Midwestern State ===
No. 7 Midwestern State Mustangs at No. 4 Texas A&M–Commerce Lions – Game summary

Quarter	1	2	3	4	Total
No. 7 Mustangs	7	0	6	13	26
No. 4 Lions	3	9	0	13	25

at Memorial Stadium, Commerce, Texas

- Date: October 8
- Game time: 7:00 p.m. CDT
- Game weather: Clear, 69 °F (21 °C)
- Game attendance: 9,208
- Referee: Joe Horn
- TV: ESPN3
- Box score, Recap

Game information
First quarter
- TAMUC – Kristov Martinez 31-yard field goal, 7:22. Lions 3–0. Drive: 15 plays, 54 yards, 7:38.
- MSU – Vincent Johnson 4-yard run (Tanner Graeber kick), 2:03. Mustangs 7–3. Drive: 11 plays, 85 yards, 5:14.

Second quarter

- TAMUC – Darby Smith 28-yard pass from Luis Perez (run failed), 6:32. Lions 9–7. Drive: 2 plays, 31 yards, 0:51.
- TAMUC – Kristov Martinez 19-yard field goal, 0:52. Lions 12–7. Drive: 7 plays, 78 yards, 3:23.

Third quarter

- MSU – Vincent Johnson 21-yard run (pass failed), 13:48. Mustangs 13–12. Drive: 3 plays, 78 yards, 1:04.

Fourth quarter

- TAMUC – Kristov Martinez 43-yard field goal, 14:14. Lions 15–13. Drive: 12 plays, 54 yards, 5:46.
- TAMUC – Kristov Martinez 21-yard field goal, 9:58. Lions 18–13. Drive: 6 plays, 30 yards, 2:35.
- TAMUC – Darby Smith 7-yard pass from Luis Perez (Kristov Martinez kick), 5:29. Lions 25–13. Drive: 6 plays, 62 yards, 2:20.
- MSU – Breion Evans 8-yard pass from Quade Coward (Tanner Graeber kick), 3:22. Lions 25–20. Drive: 5 plays, 76 yards, 2:00.
- MSU – Breion Evans 12-yard pass from Quade Coward (run failed), 0:28. Mustangs 26–25. Drive: 9 plays, 75 yards, 1:31.

Statistics

Statistics	MSU	TAMUC
First downs	24	21
Total yards	484	405
Rushing yards	211	162
Passing yards	273	243
Turnovers	2	0
Time of possession	28:22	31:38

Team	Category	Player	Statistics
Midwestern State	Passing	Quade Coward	17/25, 273 yards, 2 TD, INT
Midwestern State	Rushing	Vincent Johnson	14 rushes, 86 yards, 2 TD
Midwestern State	Receiving	Breion Evans	4 receptions, 85 yards, 2 TD
Texas A&M–Commerce	Passing	Luis Perez	18/34, 243 yards, 2 TD
Texas A&M–Commerce	Rushing	Richard Cooper	26 rushes, 128 yards
Texas A&M–Commerce	Receiving	Darby Smith	6 receptions, 131 yards, 2 TD

=== At Western New Mexico ===
No. 9 Texas A&M–Commerce Lions at Western New Mexico Mustangs – Game summary

Quarter	1	2	3	4	Total
No. 9 Lions	7	14	10	7	38
Mavericks	7	7	10	0	24

at Altamirano Stadium, Silver City, New Mexico

- Date: October 15
- Game time: 1:00 p.m. CDT / 12:00 p.m. MDT
- Game weather: Sunny, 71 °F (22 °C)
- Game attendance: 279
- Referee: Robert Newton
- Box score, Recap

Game information
First quarter
- TAMUC – Shawn Hooks 79-yard punt return (Kristov Martinez kick), 13:01. Lions 7–0.
- WNMU – DeAndre Williams 3-yard run (Tyler Vargas kick), 11:01. Tied 7–7. Drive: 6 plays, 42 yards, 1:56.

Second quarter

- TAMUC – Lance Evans 40-yard pass from Luis Perez (Kristov Martinez kick), 9:56. Lions 14–7. Drive: 8 plays, 80 yards, 3:41.
- WNMU – Rodney Lawson 26-yard pass from Javia Hall (Tyler Vargas kick), 2:01. Tied 14–14. Drive: 11 plays, 80 yards, 4:09.
- TAMUC – D'Arthur Cowan 15-yard pass from Luis Perez (Kristov Martinez kick), 0:31. Lions 21–14. Drive: 6 plays, 75 yards, 1:30.

Third quarter

- TAMUC – Kristov Martinez 44-yard field goal, 11:54. Lions 24–14. Drive: 8 plays, 33 yards, 2:57.
- TAMUC – Darby Smith 59-yard pass from Luis Perez (Kristov Martinez kick), 9:26. Lions 31–14. Drive: 2 plays, 80 yards, 0:37.
- WNMU – Treydonte Hill 34-yard pass from Javia Hall (Tyler Vargas kick), 8:55. Lions 31–21. Drive: 2 plays, 54 yards, 0:28.
- WNMU – Tyler Vargas 40-yard field goal, 2:21. Lions 31–24. Drive: 9 plays, 57 yards, 2:51.

Fourth quarter

- TAMUC – Richard Cooper 8-yard pass from Luis Perez (Kristov Martinez kick), 2:48. Lions 38–24. Drive: 6 plays, 39 yards, 2:41.

Statistics

Statistics	TAMUC	WNMU
First downs	27	28
Total yards	521	486
Rushing yards	202	74
Passing yards	319	412
Turnovers	3	4
Time of possession	30:01	29:59

Team	Category	Player	Statistics
Texas A&M–Commerce	Passing	Luis Perez	22/35, 319 yards, 4 TD, 2 INT
Texas A&M–Commerce	Rushing	Richard Cooper	24 rushes, 182 yards
Texas A&M–Commerce	Receiving	Darby Smith	5 receptions, 120 yards, TD
Western New Mexico	Passing	Javia Hall	31/50, 412 yards, 2 TD, 3 INT
Western New Mexico	Rushing	DeAndre Williams	11 rushes, 46 yards, TD
Western New Mexico	Receiving	Xavier Ayers	12 receptions, 123 yards

=== At Angelo State ===
No. 9 Texas A&M–Commerce Lions at Angelo State Rams – Game summary

Quarter	1	2	3	4	Total
No. 9 Lions	7	13	14	28	62
Rams	14	0	0	0	14

at LeGrand Sports Complex, San Angelo, Texas

- Date: October 22
- Game time: 6:00 p.m. CDT
- Game attendance: 3,406
- Referee: Andy Dunklin
- Box score, Recap

Game information
First quarter
- TAMUC – Lance Evans 41-yard pass from Luis Perez (Kristov Martinez kick), 13:28. Lions 7–0. Drive: 6 plays, 75 yards, 1:32.
- ASU – Mark Munson 80-yard pass from Carsen Cook (Casey Eyman kick), 7:34. Tied 7–7. Drive: 1 play, 80 yards, 0:11.
- ASU – Trey Green 9-yard run (Casey Eyman kick), 0:35. Rams 14–7. Drive: 11 plays, 80 yards, 4:25.

Second quarter

- TAMUC – Kristov Martinez 32-yard field goal, 11:03. Rams 14–10. Drive: 10 plays, 74 yards, 4:24.
- TAMUC – Lance Evans 14-yard pass from Luis Perez (Kristov Martinez kick), 6:14. Lions 17–14. Drive: 7 plays, 80 yards, 2:08.
- TAMUC – Kristov Martinez 41-yard field goal, 0:03. Lions 20–14. Drive: 9 plays, 40 yards, 4:12.

Third quarter

- TAMUC – Kieson Carter 18-yard fumble return (Kristov Martinez kick), 10:41. Lions 27–14.
- TAMUC – Shawn Hooks 54-yard punt return (Kristov Martinez kick), 8:51. Lions 34–14.

Fourth quarter

- TAMUC – Justice Luce 6-yard pass from Luis Perez (Kristov Martinez kick), 8:51. Lions 41–14. Drive: 8 plays, 49 yards, 2:04.
- TAMUC – Jalon Edwards-Cooper 52-yard interception return (Kristov Martinez kick), 12:14. Lions 48–14.
- TAMUC – Tristen Slaughter 14-yard run (Kristov Martinez kick), 9:08. Lions 55–14. Drive: 4 plays, 26 yards, 1:11.
- TAMUC – B. J. Mills 40-yard fumble return (Kristov Martinez kick), 4:15. Lions 62–14.

Statistics

Statistics	TAMUC	ASU
First downs	24	16
Total yards	435	368
Rushing yards	156	163
Passing yards	279	175
Turnovers	1	6
Time of possession	30:25	29:35

Team	Category	Player	Statistics
Texas A&M–Commerce	Passing	Luis Perez	20/33, 270 yards, 3 TD
Texas A&M–Commerce	Rushing	Ovie Urevbu	17 rushes, 105 yards
Texas A&M–Commerce	Receiving	Justice Luce	8 receptions, 125 yards, TD
Angelo State	Passing	Carsen Cook	11/18, 167 yards, TD, INT
Angelo State	Rushing	Josh Stevens	20 rushes, 89 yards
Angelo State	Receiving	Mark Munson	5 receptions, 109 yards, TD

=== West Texas A&M ===
West Texas A&M Buffaloes at No. 8 Texas A&M–Commerce Lions – Game summary

Quarter	1	2	3	4	Total
Buffaloes	0	0	0	0	0
No. 8 Lions	6	13	7	10	36

at Memorial Stadium, Commerce, Texas

- Date: October 29
- Game time: 4:00 p.m. CDT
- Game weather: Mostly clear, 82 °F (28 °C)
- Game attendance: 9,629
- Referee: Rickey Herron
- Box score, Recap

Game information
First quarter
- TAMUC – Richard Cooper 8-yard run (kick failed), 10:35. Lions 6–0. Drive: 11 plays, 75 yards, 4:25.

Second quarter

- TAMUC – Kristov Martinez 20-yard field goal, 9:02. Lions 9–0. Drive: 5 plays, 34 yards, 1:24.
- TAMUC – Hayden Marsh 29-yard pass from Luis Perez (Kristov Martinez kick), 7:26. Lions 16–0. Drive: 1 play, 29 yards, 0:06.
- TAMUC – Kristov Martinez 23-yard field goal, 0:01. Lions 19–0. Drive: 13 plays, 42 yards, 6:14.

Third quarter

- TAMUC – Uriah Harris 85-yard interception return (Kristov Martinez kick), 7:51. Lions 26–0.

Fourth quarter

- TAMUC – Kristov Martinez 38-yard field goal, 14:09. Lions 29–0. Drive: 13 plays, 55 yards, 6:21.
- TAMUC – Yusef Sterling-Lowe (Kristov Martinez kick), 7:15. Lions 36–0.

Statistics

Statistics	WT	TAMUC
First downs	12	19
Total yards	284	358
Rushing yards	43	124
Passing yards	241	234
Turnovers	6	1
Time of possession	25:51	34:09

Team	Category	Player	Statistics
West Texas A&M	Passing	Ben Arbuckle	26/39, 241 yards, 4 INT
West Texas A&M	Rushing	Trent Canion	4 rushes, 18 yards
West Texas A&M	Receiving	Devon Paye	10 receptions, 73 yards
Texas A&M–Commerce	Passing	Luis Perez	17/23, 230 yards, TD
Texas A&M–Commerce	Rushing	Richard Cooper	26 rushes, 105 yards, TD
Texas A&M–Commerce	Receiving	Darby Smith	3 receptions, 84 yards

=== At Texas–Permian Basin ===
No. 8 Texas A&M–Commerce Lions at UT Permian Basin Falcons – Game summary

Quarter	1	2	3	4	Total
No. 8 Lions	27	17	14	0	58
Falcons	0	7	14	0	21

at Ratliff Stadium, Odessa, Texas

- Date: November 5
- Game time: 7:00 p.m. CST
- Game attendance: 7,000
- Box score, Recap

Game information
First quarter
- TAMUC – Vincent Hobbs 23-yard pass from Luis Perez (Kristov Martinez kick), 12:28. Lions 7–0. Drive: 1 play, 23 yards, 0:10.
- TAMUC – Vincent Hobbs 42-yard pass from Luis Perez (Kristov Martinez kick), 8:55. Lions 14–0. Drive: 4 plays, 53 yards, 1:46.
- TAMUC – Reggie Kincaid 15-yard blocked punt return (Kristov Martinez kick), 6:24. Lions 21–0.
- TAMUC – Buck Wilson 20-yard pass from Luis Perez (kick failed), 0:15. Lions 27–0. Drive: 3 plays, 43 yards, 1:03.

Second quarter

- TAMUC – Kristov Martinez 24-yard field goal, 12:27. Lions 30–0. Drive: 5 plays, 38 yards, 1:52.
- TAMUC – Ovie Urevbu 2-yard pass from Luis Perez (Kristov Martinez kick), 8:13. Lions 37–0. Drive: 5 plays, 55 yards, 1:15.
- UTPB – Corin Brooks 0-yard fumble return (Bailey Giffin kick), 3:47. Lions 37–7.
- TAMUC – D'Arthur Cowan 8-yard pass from Luis Perez (Kristov Martinez kick), 2:26. Lions 44–7. Drive: 4 plays, 55 yards, 1:16.

Third quarter

- TAMUC – Ovie Urevbu 1-yard run (Kristov Martinez kick), 9:54. Lions 51–7. Drive: 9 plays, 91 yards, 2:31.
- UTPB – Marquis Simmons 1-yard run (Bailey Giffin kick), 5:54. Lions 51–14. Drive: 10 plays, 82 yards, 3:55.
- TAMUC – Hayden Marsh 48-yard pass from Gabriel Rodriguez (Kristov Martinez kick), 5:43. Lions 58–14. Drive: 1 play, 48 yards, 0:08.
- UTPB – Mitchell Leonard 62-yard pass from Kameron Mathis (Bailey Giffin kick), 4:04. Lions 58–21. Drive: 5 plays, 79 yards, 1:37.

Fourth quarter

- No scoring plays

Statistics

Statistics	TAMUC	UTPB
First downs	24	15
Total yards	591	344
Rushing yards	133	66
Passing yards	458	278
Turnovers	1	2
Time of possession	19:54	25:06

Team	Category	Player	Statistics
Texas A&M–Commerce	Passing	Luis Perez	18/25, 273 yards, 5 TD
Texas A&M–Commerce	Rushing	Ovie Urevbu	8 rushes, 85 yards, TD
Texas A&M–Commerce	Receiving	Chris Chumley	5 receptions, 92 yards
UT Permian Basin	Passing	Kameron Mathis	18/35, 278 yards, TD, INT
UT Permian Basin	Rushing	Marquis Simmons	13 rushes, 30 yards, TD
UT Permian Basin	Receiving	Mitchell Leonard	5 receptions, 111 yards, TD

=== Tarleton State ===
Tarleton State Texans at No. 8 Texas A&M–Commerce Lions – Game summary

Quarter	1	2	3	4	Total
Texans	7	3	0	0	10
No. 8 Lions	0	7	13	10	30

at Memorial Stadium, Commerce, Texas

- Date: November 12
- Game time: 4:00 p.m. CST
- Game weather: Mostly sunny, 68 °F (20 °C)
- Game attendance: 7,795
- Referee: Robert Newton
- Box score, Recap

Game information
First quarter
- TSU – Joseph Sadler 2-yard run (Sergio Sroka kick), 5:55. Texans 7–0. Drive: 9 plays, 94 yards, 4:29.

Second quarter

- TSU – Sergio Sroka 44-yard field goal, 9:05. Texans 10–0. Drive: 5 plays, 24 yards, 2:45.
- TAMUC – Vincent Hobbs 54-yard pass from Luis Perez (Kristov Martinez kick), 0:10. Texans 10–7. Drive: 4 plays, 80 yards, 0:36.

Third quarter

- TAMUC – Gabriel Rodrigeuz 1-yard run (Kristov Martinez kick), 13:29. Lions 14–10. Drive: 4 plays, 20 yards, 1:18.
- TAMUC – Richard Whitaker 8-yard run (kick blocked), 6:14. Lions 20–10. Drive: 8 plays, 56 yards, 4:07.

Fourth quarter

- TAMUC – Kristov Martinez 31-yard field goal, 10:47. Lions 23–10. Drive: 10 plays, 66 yards, 3:46.
- TAMUC – Shawn Hooks 70-yard punt return (Kristov Martinez kick), 4:45. Lions 30–10.

Statistics

Statistics	TSU	TAMUC
First downs	17	17
Total yards	335	444
Rushing yards	132	166
Passing yards	203	278
Turnovers	3	0
Time of possession	31:25	28:35

Team	Category	Player	Statistics
Tarleton State	Passing	Zed Woerner	14/22, 203 yards, 2 INT
Tarleton State	Rushing	Joseph Sadler	19 rushes, 102 yards, TD
Tarleton State	Receiving	Brant Bailey	2 receptions, 46 yards
Texas A&M–Commerce	Passing	Luis Perez	22/35, 274 yards, TD
Texas A&M–Commerce	Rushing	Ovie Urevbu	13 rushes, 106 yards
Texas A&M–Commerce	Receiving	Vincent Hobbs	3 receptions, 81 yards, TD

=== No. 25 Colorado Mesa (NCAA Division II playoffs first round) ===
No. 25 Colorado Mesa Mavericks at No. 8 Texas A&M–Commerce Lions (NCAA Division II playoffs first round) – Game summary

Quarter	1	2	3	4	Total
No. 25 Mavericks	3	0	6	14	23
No. 8 Lions	7	3	14	10	34

at Memorial Stadium, Commerce, Texas

- Date: November 19
- Game time: 2:00 p.m. CST
- Game weather: Sunny, 56 °F (13 °C)
- Game attendance: 5,529
- Referee: Stan Stence
- Box score, Recap

Game information
First quarter
- CMU – Ryan Sheehan 22-yard field goal, 8:15. Mavericks 3–0. Drive: 16 plays, 87 yards, 6:45.
- TAMUC – Gabriel Rodriguez 1-yard run (Kristov Martinez kick), 2:22. Lions 7–3. Drive: 3 plays, 72 yards, 0:42.

Second quarter

- TAMUC – Kristov Martinez 27-yard field goal, 9:44. Lions 10–3. Drive: 11 plays, 69 yards, 3:01.

Third quarter

- TAMUC – John Thomas 1-yard pass from Gabriel Rodriguez (Kristov Martinez kick), 9:26. Lions 17–3. Drive: 15 plays, 78 yards, 5:56.
- TAMUC – Vincent Hobbs 2-yard pass from Luis Perez (Kristov Martinez kick), 7:57. Lions 24–3. Drive: 4 plays, 21 yards, 0:56.
- CMU – Jonathan Beverly 30-yard run (run failed), 3:38. Lions 24–9. Drive: 9 plays, 63 yards, 4:15.

Fourth quarter

- TAMUC – Darby Smith 14-yard pass from Luis Perez (Kristov Martinez kick), 9:55. Lions 31–9. Drive: 1 play, 14 yards, 0:07.
- CMU – Marcus Hines 26-yard pass from Sean Rubalcaba (Ryan Sheehan kick), 8:49. Lions 31–16. Drive: 6 plays, 63 yards, 1:01.
- TAMUC – Kristov Martinez 46-yard field goal, 4:24. Lions 34–16. Drive: 4 plays, 7 yards, 1:34.
- CMU – Sean Rubalcaba 3-yard run (Ryan Sheehan kick), 2:01. Lions 34–23. Drive: 9 plays, 82 yards, 2:19.

Statistics

Statistics	CMU	TAMUC
First downs	29	17
Total yards	513	336
Rushing yards	217	130
Passing yards	296	206
Turnovers	5	1
Time of possession	35:47	24:13

Team	Category	Player	Statistics
Colorado Mesa	Passing	Sean Rubalcaba	30/43, 296 yards, TD, 2 INT
Colorado Mesa	Rushing	Jonathan Beverly	8 rushes, 84 yards
Colorado Mesa	Receiving	Peter Anderson	12 receptions, 99 yards
Texas A&M–Commerce	Passing	Luis Perez	17/33, 205 yards, 2 TD
Texas A&M–Commerce	Rushing	Ovie Urevbu	19 rushes, 108 yards
Texas A&M–Commerce	Receiving	Darby Smith	5 receptions, 68 yards, TD

=== At No. 2 Grand Valley State (Regional semifinals) ===
No. 8 Texas A&M–Commerce Lions at No. 2 Grand Valley State Lakers (Regional semifinals) – Game summary

Quarter	1	2	3	4	Total
No. 8 Lions	3	14	7	8	32
No. 2 Lakers	17	14	14	10	55

at Lubbers Stadium, Allendale, Michigan

- Date: November 26
- Game time: 12:00 p.m. CST / 1:00 p.m. EST
- Game weather: Cloudy, 44 °F (7 °C)
- Game attendance: 3,081
- Referee: Bob Rose
- TV: ESPN3
- Box score, Recap

Game information
First quarter
- GV – Joel Schipper 25-yard field goal, 12:00. Lakers 3–0. Drive: 5 plays, 40 yards, 1:40.
- TAMUC – Kristov Martinez 37-yard field goal, 10:10. Tied 3–3. Drive: 7 plays, 52 yards, 1:50.
- GV – Nick Dodson 13-yard pass from Bart Williams (Joel Schipper kick), 3:25. Lakers 10–3. Drive: 4 plays, 41 yards, 1:35.
- GV – Brandon Bean 25-yard pass from Bart Williams (Joel Schipper kick), 2:48. Lakers 17–3. Drive: 2 plays, 25 yards, 0:14.

Second quarter

- TAMUC – Buck Wilson 9-yard pass from Luis Perez (Kristov Martinez kick), 14:49. Lakers 17–10. Drive: 8 plays, 70 yards, 2:59.
- GV – Matt Williams 28-yard pass from Bart Williams (Joel Schipper kick), 6:24. Lakers 24–10. Drive: 12 plays, 96 yards, 4:53.
- TAMUC – Buck Wilson 68-yard pass form Luis Perez (Kristov Martinez kick), 5:32. Lakers 24–17. Drive: 3 plays, 75 yards, 0:52.
- GV – Brandon Bean 7-yard pass from Bart Williams (Joel Schipper kick), 1:12. Lakers 31–17. Drive: 9 plays, 81 yards, 4:20.

Third quarter

- TAMUC – Sterling Lowe 97-yard interception return (Kristov Martinez kick), 10:00. Lakers 31–24.
- GV – Terrell Dorsey 2-yard run (Joel Schipper kick), 5:23. Lakers 38–24. Drive: 10 plays, 71 yards, 4:37.
- GV – Marty Carter 4-yard run (Joel Schipper kick), 0:40. Lakers 45–24. Drive: 9 plays, 45 yards, 3:34.

Fourth quarter

- GV – Joel Schipper 38-yard field goal, 12:33. Lakers 48–24. Drive: 5 plays, 21 yards, 2:11.
- TAMUC – Lance Evans 13-yard pass from Luis Perez (Luis Perez pass to Buck Wilson), 8:44. Lakers 48–32. Drive: 10 plays, 70 yards, 3:49.
- GV – Terrell Dorsey 12-yard run (Joel Schipper kick), 3:09. Lakers 55–32. Drive: 4 plays, 45 yards, 1:45.

Statistics

Statistics	TAMUC	GV
First downs	16	30
Total yards	417	598
Rushing yards	97	287
Passing yards	320	311
Turnovers	2	1
Time of possession	23:30	36:30

Team	Category	Player	Statistics
Texas A&M–Commerce	Passing	Luis Perez	25/50, 318 yards, 3 TD, 2 INT
Texas A&M–Commerce	Rushing	Richard Cooper	8 rushes, 69 yards
Texas A&M–Commerce	Receiving	Buck Wilson	4 receptions, 100 yards, 2 TD
Grand Valley State	Passing	Bart Williams	17/26, 311 yards, 4 TD, INT
Grand Valley State	Rushing	Marty Carter	33 rushes, 217 yards, TD
Grand Valley State	Receiving	Brandon Bean	6 receptions, 109 yards, 2 TD

== Rankings ==
Ranking movements Legend: ██ Increase in ranking ██ Decrease in ranking т = Tied with team above or below
	Week												
Poll	Pre	1	2	3	4	5	6	7	8	9	10	11	Final
AFCA	9T	8	7	6	6	4	9	9	8	8	8	8	9

== Statistics ==
=== Scoring ===
Scores against non-conference opponents

	1	2	3	4	Total
Opponents	34	21	20	31	106
Texas A&M–Commerce	58	48	38	24	168

Scores against the Lonestar Conference

	1	2	3	4	Total
Opponents	37	36	48	32	153
Texas A&M–Commerce	99	106	78	89	372

Scores against all opponents

	1	2	3	4	Total
Opponents	71	57	68	63	259
Texas A&M–Commerce	157	154	116	113	540
