= 2016 West Texas A&M Buffaloes football team =

American college football season

2016 West Texas A&M Buffaloes football
- Conference: Lone Star Conference
- Record: 6–5 (5–4 LSC)
- Head coach: Mike Nesbitt (4th season)
- Offensive scheme: Air raid
- Defensive coordinator: Thomas Rocco (1st season)
- Base defense: 3–4
- Home stadium: Kimbrough Memorial Stadium

2016 Lone Star Conference football standings
	Conf.			Overall
Team	W		L	W		L
No. 9 Texas A&M–Commerce $^	8	–	1	10	–	2
No. 24 Midwestern State ^	7	–	2	8	–	3
Texas A&M–Kingsville #	6	–	3	9	–	3
Eastern New Mexico #	6	–	3	7	–	5
West Texas A&M	5	–	4	6	–	5
Tarleton State	5	–	4	5	–	6
Angelo State	4	–	5	5	–	6
Western New Mexico	3	–	6	3	–	8
Oklahoma Panhandle State	1	–	8	2	–	9
UT Permian Basin	0	–	9	2	–	9
$ – Conference champion; ^ – NCAA Division II playoff participant; # – bowl participant (Texas A&M–Kingsville - Live United Texarkana Bowl, Eastern New Mexico - C.H.A.M.P.S. Heart of Texas Bowl); Rankings from AFCA poll

The 2016 West Texas A&M Buffaloes football team represented West Texas A&M University (WTAMU or WT) in the 2016 NCAA Division II football season as a member of the Lone Star Conference (LSC). The Buffaloes were led by fifth-year head coach Mike Nesbitt and played their home games at Kimbrough Memorial Stadium in Canyon, Texas.

On November 18, athletic director Michael McBroom announced that Nesbitt had been fired. Nesbitt finished his career at WT with an overall record of 25–17 through four seasons.

== Preseason ==
=== LSC media poll ===
The LSC media poll was released on August 8, 2016. The Buffaloes were predicted to finish fourth.

== Schedule ==
Date	Time	Opponent	Site	Result	Attendance
September 1	9:00 p.m.	at Azusa Pacific*	Citrus Stadium; Glendora, CA	L 10–28	4,977
September 10	7:00 p.m.	at No. 19 CSU Pueblo*	ThunderBowl; Pueblo, CO	W 26–10	7,459
September 18	11:00 a.m.	at UT Permian Basin	Ratliff Stadium; Odessa, TX	W 48–14	7,674
September 24	6:00 p.m.	Tarleton State	Kimbrough Memorial Stadium; Canyon, TX	W 37–25	10,347
October 1	8:00 p.m.	at Eastern New Mexico	Greyhound Stadium; Portales, NM (Wagon Wheel)	L 30–39	3,072
October 8	5:00 p.m.	Texas A&M–Kingsville^{†}	Kimbrough Memorial Stadium; Canyon, TX	L 34–51	12,465
October 15	1:00 p.m.	at Oklahoma Panhandle State	Carl Wooten Field; Goodwell, OK	W 42–14	1,500
October 22	6:00 p.m.	No. 4 Midwestern State	Kimbrough Memorial Stadium; Canyon, TX	W 35–27	3,967
October 29	4:00 p.m.	at No. 8 Texas A&M–Commerce	Memorial Stadium; Commerce, TX (East Texas vs. West Texas)	L 0–36	9,629
November 5	6:00 p.m.	Angelo State	Kimbrough Memorial Stadium; Canyon, TX	L 6–28	2,275
November 12	1:00 p.m.	at Western New Mexico	Altamirano Stadium; Silver City, NM	W 37–30 ^{OT}	378
*Non-conference game; ^{†}Homecoming; Rankings from AFCA Poll released prior to the game; All times are in Central time

== Game summaries ==
=== At Azusa Pacific ===
	1	2	3	4	Total
Buffaloes	0	3	7	0	10
Cougars	8	3	10	7	28

Statistics	WT	APU
First downs	20	17
Total yards	273	242
Rushing yards	40	174
Passing yards	233	68
Turnovers	3	0
Time of possession	27:28	32:32

Team	Category	Player	Statistics
West Texas A&M	Passing	Ethan Brinkley	28/46, 233 yards, 2 INT
West Texas A&M	Rushing	Devon Paye	16 rushes, 62 yards, TD
West Texas A&M	Receiving	Ja'quarius Daniels	11 receptions, 93 yards
Azusa Pacific	Passing	Andrew Elffers	10/17, 68 yards
Azusa Pacific	Rushing	Kurt Scoby	17 rushes, 118 yards, 2 TD
Azusa Pacific	Receiving	Ethan Ziedler	3 receptions, 36 yards

=== At No. 19 CSU Pueblo ===
	1	2	3	4	Total
Buffaloes	3	10	13	0	26
No. 19 ThunderWolves	3	0	0	7	10

Statistics	WT	CSUP
First downs	15	17
Total yards	298	321
Rushing yards	102	229
Passing yards	196	92
Turnovers	1	3
Time of possession	28:54	31:06

Team	Category	Player	Statistics
West Texas A&M	Passing	Ethan Brinkley	24/33, 196 yards, TD
West Texas A&M	Rushing	Devon Paye	19 rushes, 100 yards
West Texas A&M	Receiving	Eppy Henriques	5 receptions, 65 yards, TD
CSU Pueblo	Passing	Rex Dausin	7/16, 75 yards, INT
CSU Pueblo	Rushing	Bernard McDondle	19 rushes, 139 yards
CSU Pueblo	Receiving	Osha Washington	3 receptions, 41 yards

=== At UT Permian Basin ===
	1	2	3	4	Total
Buffaloes	10	14	10	14	48
Falcons	7	0	0	7	14

Statistics	WT	UTPB
First downs	25	19
Total yards	460	262
Rushing yards	99	117
Passing yards	361	145
Turnovers	1	3
Time of possession	31:06	28:54

Team	Category	Player	Statistics
West Texas A&M	Passing	Ethan Brinkley	34/50, 356 yards, 2 TD
West Texas A&M	Rushing	Devon Paye	14 rushes, 93 yards
West Texas A&M	Receiving	Michael Andrews	6 receptions, 87 yards
UT Permian Basin	Passing	Kameron Mathis	8/25, 74 yards, 2 INT
UT Permian Basin	Rushing	Brandon Infiesto	12 rushes, 60 yards
UT Permian Basin	Receiving	Kristian Brown	6 receptions, 58 yards

The game was originally scheduled for the previous night, September 17, but was postponed to the following morning due to severe thunderstorms and tornado warnings in Ector County.

=== Tarleton State ===
	1	2	3	4	Total
Texans	0	6	6	13	25
Buffaloes	14	3	7	13	37

Statistics	TSU	WT
First downs	21	21
Total yards	428	479
Rushing yards	60	123
Passing yards	368	356
Turnovers	2	2
Time of possession	26:03	33:57

Team	Category	Player	Statistics
Tarleton State	Passing	Zed Woerner	26/37, 368 yards, 3 TD
Tarleton State	Rushing	Curtis McGregor	12 rushes, 46 yards, TD
Tarleton State	Receiving	Jeff Thomas	8 receptions, 132 yards
West Texas A&M	Passing	Ethan Brinkley	28/41, 356 yards, 3 TD, 2 INT
West Texas A&M	Rushing	Devon Paye	21 rushes, 148 yards, TD
West Texas A&M	Receiving	Michael Andrews	3 receptions, 79 yards

=== At Eastern New Mexico ===
	1	2	3	4	Total
Buffaloes	14	14	2	0	30
Greyhounds	7	7	18	7	39

Statistics	WT	ENMU
First downs	19	21
Total yards	392	504
Rushing yards	47	433
Passing yards	345	71
Turnovers	4	2
Time of possession	22:03	37:57

Team	Category	Player	Statistics
West Texas A&M	Passing	Ethan Brinkley	31/45, 345 yards, 3 TD, INT
West Texas A&M	Rushing	Devon Paye	12 rushes, 41 yards, TD
West Texas A&M	Receiving	Eppy Henriques	2 receptions, 77 yards
Eastern New Mexico	Passing	Wyatt Strand	5/7, 71 yards, TD
Eastern New Mexico	Rushing	Chivasiay Gallagher	24 rushes, 122 yards, 2 TD
Eastern New Mexico	Receiving	Aaron Johnson	2 receptions, 53 yards

=== Texas A&M–Kingsville ===
	1	2	3	4	Total
Javelinas	20	10	14	7	51
Buffaloes	0	7	7	20	34

Statistics	TAMUK	WT
First downs	25	21
Total yards	445	510
Rushing yards	267	34
Passing yards	178	476
Turnovers	1	3
Time of possession	31:34	28:26

Team	Category	Player	Statistics
Texas A&M–Kingsville	Passing	Myles Carr	10/19, 155 yards, 2 TD
Texas A&M–Kingsville	Rushing	Greg Pitre	21 rushes, 130 yards, TD
Texas A&M–Kingsville	Receiving	Stehly Reden	2 receptions, 74 yards
West Texas A&M	Passing	Ben Arbuckle	18/33, 354 yards, 4 TD, 2 INT
West Texas A&M	Rushing	Devon Paye	16 rushes, 86 yards
West Texas A&M	Receiving	Junior Pomee	6 receptions, 115 yards, 2 TD

=== At Oklahoma Panhandle State ===
	1	2	3	4	Total
Buffaloes	7	14	7	14	42
Aggies	0	7	7	0	14

Statistics	WT	OPSU
First downs	24	24
Total yards	409	396
Rushing yards	117	157
Passing yards	292	239
Turnovers	1	2
Time of possession	30:29	29:31

Team	Category	Player	Statistics
West Texas A&M	Passing	Ben Arbuckle	30/42, 292 yards, 6 TD
West Texas A&M	Rushing	Devon Paye	15 rushes, 80 yards
West Texas A&M	Receiving	Junior Pomee	11 receptions, 124 yards, 4 TD
Oklahoma Panhandle State	Passing	Shane Truelove	19/34, 218 yards, 2 TD
Oklahoma Panhandle State	Rushing	Xavier Jones	10 rushes, 61 yards
Oklahoma Panhandle State	Receiving	Devyn Williams	5 receptions, 78 yards

=== No. 4 Midwestern State ===
	1	2	3	4	Total
No. 4 Mustangs	0	14	10	3	27
Buffaloes	14	7	7	7	35

Statistics	MSU	WT
First downs	18	21
Total yards	338	396
Rushing yards	192	215
Passing yards	146	181
Turnovers	1	1
Time of possession	29:11	30:49

Team	Category	Player	Statistics
Midwestern State	Passing	Quade Coward	14/32, 141 yards, TD
Midwestern State	Rushing	Vincent Johnson	17 rushes, 81 yards
Midwestern State	Receiving	Breion Evans	4 receptions, 77 yards
West Texas A&M	Passing	Ben Arbuckle	21/28, 181 yards, 2 TD
West Texas A&M	Rushing	Devon Paye	30 rushes, 177 yards, 2 TD
West Texas A&M	Receiving	Eppy Henriques	2 receptions, 52 yards

=== At No. 8 Texas A&M–Commerce ===
	1	2	3	4	Total
Buffaloes	0	0	0	0	0
No. 8 Lions	6	13	7	10	36

Statistics	WT	TAMUC
First downs	12	19
Total yards	284	358
Rushing yards	43	124
Passing yards	241	234
Turnovers	6	1
Time of possession	25:51	34:09

Team	Category	Player	Statistics
West Texas A&M	Passing	Ben Arbuckle	26/39, 241 yards, 4 INT
West Texas A&M	Rushing	Trent Canion	4 rushes, 18 yards
West Texas A&M	Receiving	Devon Paye	10 receptions, 73 yards
Texas A&M–Commerce	Passing	Luis Perez	17/23, 230 yards, TD
Texas A&M–Commerce	Rushing	Richard Cooper	26 rushes, 105 yards, TD
Texas A&M–Commerce	Receiving	Darby Smith	3 receptions, 84 yards

=== Angelo State ===
	1	2	3	4	Total
Rams	7	7	0	14	28
Buffaloes	0	0	0	6	6

Statistics	ASU	WT
First downs	18	8
Total yards	246	137
Rushing yards	190	71
Passing yards	56	66
Turnovers	0	4
Time of possession	42:00	18:00

Team	Category	Player	Statistics
Angelo State	Passing	Jake Faber	8/13, 56 yards, TD
Angelo State	Rushing	Josh Stevens	30 rushes, 119 yards, TD
Angelo State	Receiving	Josh Stevens	5 receptions, 40 yards, TD
West Texas A&M	Passing	Ben Arbuckle	11/23, 66 yards, TD, 2 INT
West Texas A&M	Rushing	Trent Canion	9 rushes, 40 yards
West Texas A&M	Receiving	Junior Pomee	1 reception, 25 yards, TD

=== At Western New Mexico ===
	1	2	3	4	OT	Total
Buffaloes	13	3	0	14	7	37
Mustangs	14	0	6	10	0	30

Statistics	WT	WNMU
First downs	16	26
Total yards	348	443
Rushing yards	38	251
Passing yards	310	192
Turnovers	0	3
Time of possession	20:59	39:01

Team	Category	Player	Statistics
West Texas A&M	Passing	Ethan Brinkley	14/26, 208 yards, 3 TD
West Texas A&M	Rushing	Devon Paye	12 rushes, 63 yards
West Texas A&M	Receiving	Chris Gilchrist	8 receptions, 109 yards, 2 TD
Western New Mexico	Passing	Javia Hall	20/40, 195 yards, 2 TD, 2 INT
Western New Mexico	Rushing	DeAndre Williams	27 rushes, 127 yards, 2 TD
Western New Mexico	Receiving	Xavier Ayers	7 receptions, 75 yards
