= Russell Gaskamp =

American football coach

Current position
- Title: Head coach
- Team: Franklin Pierce
- Conference: NE-10
- Record: 18–43

Biographical details
- Born: c. 1976 (age 49–50); Fort Worth, Texas, U.S.
- Education: University of Texas (1999); Sam Houston State University (2005)

Playing career
- 1994–1998: Texas
- Position: Offensive lineman

Coaching career (HC unless noted)
- 2000–2001: Austin Rattlers (OC)
- 2002: Austin Rattlers
- 2003–2004: Sam Houston State (GA)
- 2005: Texas A&M–Commerce (OL)
- 2006–2008: Southwestern Oklahoma State (AHC/OC)
- 2009–2010: Angelo State (OL)
- 2011: Angelo State (OC)
- 2012–2018: Oklahoma Panhandle State
- 2019–present: Franklin Pierce

Head coaching record
- Overall: 53–81 (college); 13–2 (indoor football)

Accomplishments and honors

Awards
- Southwest Conference Champion (1994, 1995)*; Big 12 Champion (1996)*; 1994 Sun Bowl Champion*; 1999 Cotton Bowl Classic Champion*; * As a player

Russell Gaskamp (born c. 1976) is an American football coach. He is the head football coach for Franklin Pierce University, a position he has held since 2019. He was the head football coach for Oklahoma Panhandle State University from 2012 to 2018. He was the head football coach for the Austin Rattlers of the North American Football League (NAFL). He also coached for Sam Houston State, Texas A&M–Commerce, Southwestern Oklahoma State, and Angelo State. He played college football for Texas as an offensive lineman.

== Playing career ==
Gaskamp played football for three seasons at Weatherford High School and helped them win back-to-back state titles in 1991 and 1992. He was all-state in both wrestling and football and was a USA Today High School All-American in 1993.

Gaskamp went to college at the University of Texas where he played center for the Longhorns football team from 1994 to 1998, lettering in 1996 and 1998. He helped the Longhorns win three conference championships and played in the Sun, Sugar, Fiesta and Cotton Bowls. He started all 13 games at center in 1998 and was part of the offensive line that helped Ricky Williams set the college career rushing record in his Heisman Trophy winning year. He was named to the Longhorn All-Decade Team of the 1990's.

In 2016, he was named to the Weatherford Athletic Hall of Fame.

== Coaching career ==
Gaskamp had several years of assistant coaching experience before becoming a head coach at the college level. From 1999–2000, he was the offensive coordinator for the Austin Rattlers minor league football team, helping them win back to back championships. In 2002, he was promoted to head coach and led them to a 13–1 record and to the North American Football League (NAFL) Championship game.

He taught and coached at Austin's Johnston High School from 2002–04.

He then moved to college football and was a graduate assistant/tight ends coach at NCAA Division I-AA/FCS Sam Houston State on the Bearkats 2004 national semi-finals team. He was the offensive line coach at Texas A&M–Commerce from 2005–06. He was the offensive coordinator at Southwestern Oklahoma State from 2006–08 and was an assistant coach at Angelo State from 2009–2011.

In 2011, he was hired as the head coach at Oklahoma Panhandle State and stayed in the position as the team dropped down to NAIA. In 2018, he was hired as the head coach at Franklin Pierce.

== Head coaching record ==
=== College ===
Year	Team	Overall	Conference	Standing	Bowl/playoffs	NAIA Coaches'^{#}
Oklahoma Panhandle State Aggies (NCAA Division II independent) (2012–2015)
2012	Oklahoma Panhandle State	4–6				
2013	Oklahoma Panhandle State	4–7				
2014	Oklahoma Panhandle State	7–3				
2015	Oklahoma Panhandle State	5–5				
Oklahoma Panhandle State Aggies (Lone Star Conference) (2016)
2016	Oklahoma Panhandle State	2–9	1–8	9th		
Oklahoma Panhandle State Aggies (Central States Football League) (2017)
2017	Oklahoma Panhandle State	7–3	6–2	3rd		24
Oklahoma Panhandle State Aggies (Sooner Athletic Conference) (2018)
2018	Oklahoma Panhandle State	6–5	6–2	2nd		
Oklahoma Panhandle State:		35–38	13–12			
Franklin Pierce Ravens (Northeast-10 Conference) (2019–present)
2019	Franklin Pierce	1–10	0–8	9th		
2020–21	No team					
2021	Franklin Pierce	0–10	0–8	9th		
2022	Franklin Pierce	2–8	1–6	T–7th		
2023	Franklin Pierce	4–6	3–4	T–4th		
2024	Franklin Pierce	5–5	5–3	T–3rd		
2025	Franklin Pierce	6–4	5–2	T–3rd		
Franklin Pierce:		18–43	14–31			
Total:		53–81				
