= Franklin Pierce Ravens football =

College football team

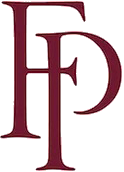
- First season: 2019; 7 years ago
- Athletic director: Rachel Burleson
- Head coach: Russell Gaskamp; 5th season, 12–39 (.235)
- Location: Rindge, New Hampshire
- Stadium: Sodexo Field (capacity: 500)
- NCAA division: Division II
- Conference: Northeast-10 Conference
- Colors: Crimson and gray
- All-time record: 12–39 (.235)
- Mascot: Raven
- Website: fpuravens.com

The Franklin Pierce Ravens football team represents Franklin Pierce University in college football at the NCAA Division II level. The Ravens are members of the Northeast-10 Conference (NE-10), fielding its team in the NE-10 since 2019. The Ravens play their home games at Sodexo Field in Rindge, New Hampshire.

Their head coach is Russell Gaskamp, who took over the position for the team's inaugural season in 2019.

== Conference affiliations ==
- Northeast-10 Conference (2019–present)

== List of head coaches ==
Key

- OC – order
- GC – games coached
- CW – conference wins
- PW – postseason wins
- DC – division titles
- OW – overall wins
- CL – conference losses
- PL – postseason losses
- CC – conference titles
- OL – overall losses
- CT – conference ties
- PT – postseason ties
- NC – national titles
- OT – overall ties
- C% – conference winning percentage
- O% – overall winning percentage

=== Coaches ===
List of head football coaches showing season(s) coached, overall records, conference records, postseason records, championships and selected awards:

No.	Name	Season(s)	GC	OW	OL	O%	CW	CL	C%	PW	PL	DC	CC	NC	Awards
1	Russell Gaskamp	2019–present	41	7	34	0.171	4	26	0.133	—	—	—	—	—	—

== Year-by-year results ==
National champions	Conference champions	Bowl game berth	Playoff berth

Season	Head coach	Association	Division	Conference	Record					Postseason	Final ranking
Season	Head coach	Association	Division	Conference	Overall		Conference			Postseason	Final ranking
Season	Head coach	Association	Division	Conference	Win	Loss	Finish	Win	Loss	Postseason	Final ranking
2019	Russell Gaskamp	NCAA	Division II	NE-10	1	10	9th	0	8	—	—
2020	(no tournament held due to COVID-19 pandemic)										
2021	Russell Gaskamp	NCAA	Division II	NE-10	0	10	9th	0	8	—	—
2022	Russell Gaskamp	NCAA	Division II	NE-10	2	8	T–7th	1	6	—	—
2023	Russell Gaskamp	NCAA	Division II	NE-10	4	6	T–4th	3	4	—	—
2024	Russell Gaskamp	NCAA	Division II	NE-10	5	5	T-3rd	5	3	—	—
2025	Russell Gaskamp	NCAA	Division II	NE-10	6	4	3rd	5	2		
