= 2016 UT Permian Basin Falcons football team =

American college football season

2016 UT Permian Basin Falcons football
- Conference: Lone Star Conference
- Record: 2–9 (0–9 LSC)
- Head coach: Justin Carrigan (1st season)
- Offensive coordinator: Scott Preston (1st season)
- Offensive scheme: Air raid
- Co-defensive coordinators: Chris Mineo (1st season); Jacob Martin (1st season)
- Base defense: 3–4
- Home stadium: Ratliff Stadium; Grande Communications Stadium

2016 Lone Star Conference football standings
	Conf.			Overall
Team	W		L	W		L
No. 9 Texas A&M–Commerce $^	8	–	1	10	–	2
No. 24 Midwestern State ^	7	–	2	8	–	3
Texas A&M–Kingsville #	6	–	3	9	–	3
Eastern New Mexico #	6	–	3	7	–	5
West Texas A&M	5	–	4	6	–	5
Tarleton State	5	–	4	5	–	6
Angelo State	4	–	5	5	–	6
Western New Mexico	3	–	6	3	–	8
Oklahoma Panhandle State	1	–	8	2	–	9
UT Permian Basin	0	–	9	2	–	9
$ – Conference champion; ^ – NCAA Division II playoff participant; # – bowl participant (Texas A&M–Kingsville - Live United Texarkana Bowl, Eastern New Mexico - C.H.A.M.P.S. Heart of Texas Bowl); Rankings from AFCA poll

The 2016 UT Permian Basin Falcons football team represented the University of Texas Permian Basin (UTPB) in the 2016 NCAA Division II football season as a member of the Lone Star Conference. The program's inaugural season, the Falcons were led by head coach Justin Carrigan; Carrigan previously served as the offensive coordinator at Tarleton State.

The Falcons started the season 2–0, with victories over Division III Sul Ross and NAIA Arizona Christian. The team would lose the remainder of its games to finish its inaugural season at 2–9, going 0–9 in conference play.

The Falcons played their home games at Ratliff Stadium in Odessa, Texas, with one home game played at Grande Communications Stadium in Midland.

== Preseason ==
=== LSC media poll ===
In the LSC's preseason media poll the Falcons were predicted to finish last in the conference, though they also received a first place vote.

== Schedule ==
The team's 2016 schedule consisted of seven home games and four away games. The Falcons hosted LSC foes West Texas A&M, Western New Mexico, Eastern New Mexico, and Texas A&M–Commerce and traveled to Tarleton State, Texas A&M–Kingsville, Midwestern State, and Angelo State. The Falcons played Oklahoma Panhandle State at Grande Communications Stadium in the neighboring city of Midland, Texas.

The Falcons hosted non-conference foes Sul Ross from the American Southwest Conference and Arizona Christian from the Central States Football League.

Date	Time	Opponent	Site	Result	Attendance
September 3	7:00 p.m.	Sul Ross*	Ratliff Stadium; Odessa, TX	W 27–6	13,856
September 10	7:00 p.m.	Arizona Christian*	Ratliff Stadium; Odessa, TX	W 49–34	9,487
September 18	11:00 a.m.	West Texas A&M	Ratliff Stadium; Odessa, TX	L 14–48	7,674
September 24	7:00 p.m.	Western New Mexico	Ratliff Stadium; Odessa, TX	L 17–68	7,934
October 1	7:00 p.m.	at Tarleton State	Memorial Stadium; Stephenville, TX	L 20–48	6,735
October 8	7:00 p.m.	Eastern New Mexico^{†}	Ratliff Stadium; Odessa, TX	L 3–34	6,879
October 15	7:00 p.m.	at Texas A&M–Kingsville	Javelina Stadium; Kingsville, TX	L 7–56	11,333
October 21	7:00 p.m.	Oklahoma Panhandle State	Grande Communications Stadium; Midland, TX	L 44–54	5,459
October 28	7:00 p.m.	at No. 13 Midwestern State	Memorial Stadium; Wichita Falls, TX	L 21–76	8,722
November 5	7:00 p.m.	No. 8 Texas A&M–Commerce	Ratliff Stadium; Odessa, TX	L 21–58	7,000
November 12	6:00 p.m.	at Angelo State	LeGrand Sports Complex; San Angelo, TX	L 21–70	3,148
*Non-conference game; ^{†}Homecoming; Rankings from AFCA Poll released prior to the game; All times are in Central time

Schedule source:

== Roster ==
2016 UT Permian Basin Falcons football team roster
Players
Coaches
Offense

Pos.	#	Name	Class
WR	2	Mitchell Leonard	So
QB	4	Kameron Mathis	Fr
WR	5	Kristian Brown	Fr
QB	6	Michael Myers	Fr
QB	7	Aaron Swain	Fr
WR	9	Jesse Jones	Fr
WR	11	Terrell Davidson	Fr
QB	16	Caden Coots	So
WR	17	Ben Galaviz	Fr
RB	28	Brandon Infiesto	Fr
RB	33	Jordan Williams	Fr
RB	35	Marquis Simmons	Fr
RB	36	Exavier Simpson	Fr
RB	39	Jason McAfee	So
TE	42	Phillip Taylor	Fr
RB	46	Xavier Thurman	Fr
RB	48	Lucas Cordova	Fr
QB	49	Brandon Vasquez	Fr
OL	54	Byron Hutson	Fr
OL	56	Dominic Assad	Fr
OL	57	Corin Brooks	Sr
OL	59	Micah Edwards	Fr
OL	64	Pablo Gutierrez	Fr
OL	65	Kane Price	Fr
OL	66	Trace Notley	Fr
OL	67	Dylan Ohrt	Fr
OL	68	Erik Nava	So
OL	70	Hunter Bowers	Fr
OL	71	Hector Herrera	Fr
OL	73	Charles Hunt	Fr
OL	75	Samuel Robertson	Fr
OL	76	Brontre' Wright	Fr
OL	79	Ryan Wilson	Fr
WR	81	Jake Anglin	Fr
WR	83	Tyler Harris	Fr
WR	84	Cale Danielson	So
WR	85	Tori Loud	Fr
WR	86	Dylan Anderson	Fr
WR	87	Devin Elliott	Fr
WR	89	Brandon Edmonds	Fr
WR		Le'Arious Allen	Fr
WR		TQ Echols	Fr
WR		Jack Grimm	Fr
WR		Hunter Kliafas	So
RB		Roosevelt Richmond	Fr
WR		Mark Villarreal	Fr

Defense

Pos.	#	Name	Class
DT	1	Jared Thames	Jr
CB	3	Diameon Brewer	Fr
LB	8	Christian Weaver	Fr
LB	10	Emilio Solis	Fr
CB	12	Alonzo Turner	Fr
CB	13	Clifton Holmes	Fr
S	15	Montique Coles	Fr
OLB	18	Ryan Baker	Fr
DB	19	Andraque Jones	Fr
S	20	Javier Gomez III	Fr
CB	21	Erin Mack	Fr
S	22	Josh Terrell	Fr
OLB	23	Cameron Hurd	Fr
OLB	24	John O'Kelley	Fr
S	25	BJ Huitt	Fr
CB	26	Dee Johnson	Fr
S	29	Jeff Douglas	Fr
S	31	Tristian Perez	Fr
LB	34	Josh Nguyen	Fr
OLB	37	Cameron Terrell	So
S	38	Jacob Holley	Fr
LB	40	Chris Hoad	Fr
LB	41	John Fineoeut	So
LB	44	Keegan Gray	Fr
DE	45	Nathan White	Fr
CB	47	Korbin Martinez	Fr
DE	50	AJ Fano	Jr
DE	51	Rick Rivera	Fr
LB	52	Dyquan Howard	Fr
DE	55	Ieti Manu	Jr
DE	88	Logan Gilliam	Fr
DT	90	Ray Dinnall-Guerra	Fr
DE	91	Josh Gregory	Fr
DT	92	Marquee Allison	Fr
DT	93	Frank Seiuli	Jr
DE	94	Reagan Havis	Fr
DT	97	Jacob Granado	Fr
DE	98	Josh Swopes	Fr
DE	99	Diego Assad	Fr
CB		Akil Alexander	Fr

Special teams

Pos.	#	Name	Class
K, P	14	Bailey Giffen	Fr
K, P		Matt Harper	Fr

Head coach

- Justin Carrigan

Coordinators/assistant coaches

- Scott Preston
  Offensive coordinator/quarterbacks
- Chris Mineo
  Associate head coach/co-defensive coordinator/defensive line
- Jacob Martin
  Co-defensive coordinator/linebackers
- Carlos Barocio-Leon
  Special teams coordinator/running backs

Legend

- (C) Team captain
- (S) Suspended
- (I) Ineligible
- Injured
- Redshirt

Roster
Last update: July 6, 2023

== Game summaries ==
=== Sul Ross ===
Sul Ross Lobos at UT Permian Basin Falcons – Game summary

Quarter	1	2	3	4	Total
Lobos	0	0	0	6	6
Falcons	7	3	10	7	27

at Ratliff Stadium, Odessa, Texas

- Date: September 3
- Game time: 7:00 p.m. CDT
- Game attendance: 13,856
- Referee: Dan Rankin
- Box score, Recap

Game information
First quarter
- UTPB – Brandon Infiesto 1-yard run (Bailey Giffen kick), 10:46. Falcons 7–0. Drive: 7 plays, 54 yards, 2:39.

Second quarter

- UTPB – Bailey Giffen 27-yard field goal, 7:58. Falcons 10–0. Drive: 7 plays, 53 yards, 2:22.

Third quarter

- UTPB – Kristian Brown 10-yard pass from Kameron Mathis (Bailey Giffen kick), 13:54. Falcons 17–0. Drive: 3 plays, 10 yards, 0:51.
- UTPB – Bailey Giffen 30-yard field goal, 3:17. Falcons 20–0. Drive: 4 plays, 0 yards, 0:52.

Fourth quarter

- SRSU – James Davis 23-yard run (run failed), 13:40. Falcons 20–6. Drive: 4 plays, 42 yards, 2:05.
- UTPB – Kristian Brown 15-yard pass from Kristian Brown (Bailey Giffen kick), 12:18. Falcons 27–6. Drive: 3 plays, 85 yards, 1:14.

Statistics	SRSU	UTPB
First downs	20	15
Total yards	301	291
Rushing yards	138	128
Passing yards	163	163
Turnovers	2	3
Time of possession	38:46	21:14

Team	Category	Player	Statistics
Sul Ross	Passing	James Davis	19/35, 154 yards, 2 INT
Sul Ross	Rushing	James Davis	15 rushes, 79 yards, TD
Sul Ross	Receiving	Byron Jones	4 receptions, 41 yards
UT Permian Basin	Passing	Kameron Mathis	13/25, 163 yards, 2 TD, INT
UT Permian Basin	Rushing	Brandon Infiesto	16 rushes, 102 yards, TD
UT Permian Basin	Receiving	Terrell Davidson	2 receptions, 68 yards

=== Arizona Christian ===
Arizona Christian at UT Permian Basin – Game summary

Quarter	1	2	3	4	Total
Firestorm	6	6	15	7	34
Falcons	0	21	14	14	49

at Ratliff Stadium, Odessa, Texas

- Date: September 10
- Game time: 7:00 p.m. CDT
- Game attendance: 9,587
- Referee: Robert Newton
- Box score, Recap

Game information
First quarter
- ACU – Quinta Thomas 10-yard run (pass failed), 3:42. Firestorm 6–0. Drive: 16 plays, 99 yards, 6:02.

Second quarter

- UTPB – Chris Hoad 32-yard fumble return (Cale Danielson kick), 3:23. Falcons 7–6.
- ACU – Quinta Thomas 40-yard run (run failed), 2:10. Firestorm 12–7. Drive 4 plays, 51 yards, 1:04.
- UTPB – Jake Anglin 18-yard pass from Kameron Mathis (Cale Danielson kick), 0:40. Falcons 14–12. Drive: 9 plays, 75 yards, 1:30.
- UTPB – Erin Mack 40-yard blocked kick return (Cale Danielson kick), 0:00. Falcons 21–12.

Third quarter

- UTPB – Brandon Infiesto 2-yard run (Cale Danielson kick), 9:09. Falcons 28–12. Drive: 4 plays, 20 yards, 1:26.
- ACU – Johnathon Parks 14-yard pass from Gerrit Groenewold (pass failed), 6:30. Falcons 28–18. Drive: 8 plays, 60 yards, 2:34.
- UTPB – Kristian Brown 13-yard pass from Kameron Mathis (Cale Danielson kick), 4:52. Falcons 35–18. Drive: 6 plays, 75 yards, 1:33.
- ACU – Johnathon Parks 50-yard pass from Gerrit Groenewold (kick failed), 4:19. Falcons 35–24. Drive: 2 plays, 60 yards, 0:28.
- ACU – Derek Brush 23-yard field goal, 0:18. Falcons 35–27. Drive :4 plays, 75 yards, 0:53.

Fourth quarter

- UTPB – Terrell Davidson 20-yard pass from Kameron Mathis (Cale Danielson kick), 14:25. Falcons 42–27. Drive: 4 plays, 75 yards, 0:53.
- ACU – Justin Carroll 67-yard run (Derek Brush kick), 5:49. Falcons 42–34. Drive: 4 plays, 85 yards, 1:08.
- UTPB – Jordan Williams 1-yard run (Cale Danielson kick), 0:41. Falcons 49–34. Drive: 12 plays, 82 yards, 5:02.

Statistics	ACU	UTPB
First downs	29	31
Total yards	577	495
Rushing yards	236	127
Passing yards	341	368
Turnovers	3	2
Time of possession	32:33	27:27

Team	Category	Player	Statistics
Arizona Christian	Passing	Gerrit Groenewold	26/41, 293 yards, 2 TD
Arizona Christian	Rushing	Quinta Thomas	8 rushes, 85 yards, 2 TD
Arizona Christian	Receiving	Johnathon Parks	5 receptions, 103 yards, 2 TD
UT Permian Basin	Passing	Kameron Mathis	34/55, 368 yards, 3 TD, INT
UT Permian Basin	Rushing	Brandon Infiesto	21 rushes, 87 yards, TD
UT Permian Basin	Receiving	Mitchell Leonard	9 receptions, 117 yards

=== West Texas A&M ===
West Texas A&M Buffaloes at UT Permian Basin Falcons – Game summary

Quarter	1	2	3	4	Total
Buffaloes	10	14	10	14	48
Falcons	7	0	0	7	14

at Ratliff Stadium, Odessa, Texas

- Date: September 18
- Game time: 11:00 a.m. CDT
- Game attendance: 7,674
- Referee: Andy Dunkin
- Box score, Recap

Game information
First quarter
- WTAMU – Conner Hollabaugh 42-yard field goal, 10:56. Buffaloes 3–0. Drive: 10 plays, 49 yards, 4:04.
- UTPB – Christian Weaver 32-yard fumble return (Bailey Giffen kick), 7:50. Falcons 7–3.
- WTAMU – Eppy Henriques 18-yard pass from Ethan Brinkley (Conner Hollabaugh kick), 5:35. Buffaloes 10–7. Drive: 9 plays, 67 yards, 2:08.

Second quarter

- WTAMU – Trent Canion 6-yard run (Conner Hollabaugh kick), 11:27. Buffaloes 17–7. Drive: 10 plays, 80 yards, 3:51.
- WTAMU – Ja'Quarius Daniels 6-yard pass from Ethan Brinkley (Conner Hollabaugh kick), 0:04. Buffaloes 24–7. Drive: 7 plays, 70 yards, 1:09.

Third quarter

- WTAMU – Conner Hollabaugh 38-yard field goal, 6:44. Buffaloes 27–7. Drive: 11 plays, 56 yards, 4:51.
- WTAMU – Ethan Brinkley 3-yard run (Conner Hollabaugh kick), 4:52. Buffaloes 34–7. Drive: 2 plays, 8 yards, 0:22.

Fourth quarter

- WTAMU – P. J. Leonce 69-yard punt return (Conner Hollabaugh kick), 9:31. Buffaloes 41–7.
- WTAMU – Nathan Rodgers 5-yard pass from Ben Arbuckle (Conner Hollabaugh kick), 8:00. Buffaloes 48–7. Drive: 3 plays, 8 yards, 1:01.
- UTPB – Terrell Davidson 9-yard pass from Caden Coots (Bailey Giffen kick), 0:52. Buffaloes 48–14. Drive: 15 plays, 75 yards, 7:07.

Statistics	WTAMU	UTPB
First downs	25	19
Total yards	460	262
Rushing yards	99	117
Passing yards	361	145
Turnovers	1	3
Time of possession	31:06	28:54

Team	Category	Player	Statistics
West Texas A&M	Passing	Ethan Brinkley	34/50, 356 yards, 2 TD
West Texas A&M	Rushing	Devon Paye	14 rushes, 93 yards
West Texas A&M	Receiving	Michael Andrews	6 receptions, 87 yards
UT Permian Basin	Passing	Kameron Mathis	8/25, 74 yards, 2 INT
UT Permian Basin	Rushing	Brandon Infiesto	12 rushes, 60 yards
UT Permian Basin	Receiving	Kristian Brown	6 receptions, 58 yards

The game was originally scheduled for the previous night, but was postponed due to severe thunderstorms and tornado warnings in Ector County.

=== Western New Mexico ===
Western New Mexico Mustangs at UT Permian Basin Falcons – Game summary

Quarter	1	2	3	4	Total
Mustangs	13	14	27	14	68
Falcons	3	7	7	0	17

at Ratliff Stadium, Odessa, Texas

- Date: September 24
- Game time: 7:00 p.m. CDT
- Game attendance: 7,934
- Referee: Matt Jones
- Box score, Recap

Game information
First quarter
- WNMU – Xavier Ayers 41-yard pass from Javia Hall (kick blocked), 11:41. Mustangs 6–0. Drive: 10 plays, 85 yards, 3:19.
- UTPB – Bailey Giffen 38-yard field goal, 3:42. Mustangs 6–3. Drive: 7 plays, 48 yards, 2:42.
- WNMU – Treydonte Hill 19-yard pass from Javia Hall (Tyler Vargas kick), 0:39. Mustangs 13–3. Drive: 9 plays, 65 yards, 2:53.

Second quarter

- UTPB – Mitchell Leonard 23-yard pass from Kameron Mathis (Bailey Giffen kick), 8:53. Mustangs 13–10. Drive: 3 plays, 30 yards, 1:00.
- WNMU – Preston Blincoe 15-yard run (Tyler Vargas kick), 5:59. Mustangs 20–10. Drive: 2 plays, 37 yards, 0:43.
- WNMU – Xavier Ayers 10-yard pass from Javia Hall (Tyler Vargas kick), 0:03. Mustangs 27–10. Drive: 6 plays, 50 yards, 1:04.

Third quarter

- WNMU – Aaron Leauma 27-yard fumble return (Tyler Vargas kick), 14:08. Mustangs 34–10.
- WNMU – Treydonte Hill 21-yard pass from Javia Hill (Tyler Vargas kick), 10:44. Mustangs 41–10. Drive: 4 plays, 46 yards, 1:28.
- UTPB – Jason McAfee 20-yard run (Bailey Giffen kick), 8:14. Mustangs 41–17. Drive: 6 plays, 65 yards, 2:21.
- WNMU – Mazin Khalil 45-yard kickoff return (kick blocked), 8:05. Mustangs 47–17.
- WNMU – Gordy Longville 1-yard run (Tyler Vargas kick), 3:03. Mustangs 54–17. Drive: 6 plays, 73 yards, 2:46.

Fourth quarter

- WNMU – Xavier Ayers 25-yard pass from Matt Hommel (Tyler Vargas kick), 13:07. Mustangs 61–17. Drive: 10 plays, 92 yards, 3:32.
- WNMU – Alfonso Wilson 26-yard blocked punt return (Tyler Vargas kick), 10:30. Mustangs 68–17.

Statistics	WNMU	UTPB
First downs	29	18
Total yards	535	342
Rushing yards	187	197
Passing yards	348	145
Turnovers	0	2
Time of possession	33:36	26:24

Team	Category	Player	Statistics
Western New Mexico	Passing	Javia Hall	21/35, 284 yards, 4 TD
Western New Mexico	Rushing	Preston Blincoe	13 rushes, 67 yards, TD
Western New Mexico	Receiving	Xavier Ayers	7 receptions, 139 yards, 3 TD
UT Permian Basin	Passing	Kameron Mathis	6/18, 90 yards, TD
UT Permian Basin	Rushing	Brandon Infiesto	14 rushes, 94 yards
UT Permian Basin	Receiving	Terrell Davidson	3 receptions, 58 yards

=== At Tarleton State ===
UT Permian Basin Falcons at Tarleton State Texans – Game summary

Quarter	1	2	3	4	Total
Falcons	7	6	0	7	20
Texans	21	17	10	0	48

at Memorial Stadium, Stephenville, Texas

- Date: October 1
- Game time: 7:00 p.m. CDT
- Game weather: Temperature: 79 °F (26 °C) • Weather: Sunny • Wind: SSW 0 MPH
- Game attendance: 6,735
- Referee: John Belcher
- Box score, Recap

Game information
First quarter
- TSU – Del'Michael High 42-yard pass from Zed Woerner (Sergio Sroka kick), 12:59. Texans 7–0. Drive: 4 plays, 61 yards, 0:57.
- TSU – Joseph Sadler 2-yard run (Sergio Sroka kick), 11:40. Texans 14–0. Drive: 1 play, 2 yards, 0:03.
- UTPB – Brandon Infiesto 18-yard run (Bailey Giffen kick), 8:46. Texans 14–7. Drive: 10 plays, 75 yards, 2:54.
- TSU – Basil Jackson 41-yard interception return (Sergio Sroka kick), 0:00. Texans 21–7.

Second quarter

- TSU – Jeff Thomas 24-yard pass from Zed Woerner (Sergio Sroka kick), 11:07. Texans 28–7. Drive: 6 plays, 67 yards, 2:28.
- TSU – Jabari Anderson 15-yard pass from Zed Woerner (Sergio Sroka kick), 9:53. Texans 35–7. Drive: 1 play, 15 yards, 0:07.
- TSU – Sergio Sroka 20-yard field goal, 3:53. Texans 38–7. Drive: 6 plays, 36 yards, 2:02.
- UTPB – Mitchell Leonard 22-yard pass from Caden Coots (run failed), 1:13. Texans 38–13. Drive: 6 plays, 72 yards, 2:32.

Third quarter

- TSU – Del'Michael High 31-yard pass from Zed Woerner (Sergio Sroka kick), 10:29. Texans 45–13. Drive: 8 plays, 76 yards, 4:24.
- TSU – Sergio Sroka 25-yard field goal, 9:01. Texans 48–13. Drive: 4 plays, 17 yards, 1:17.

Fourth quarter

- UTPB – Brandon Infiesto 12-yard run (Bailey Giffen kick), 7:58. Texans 48–20. Drive: 12 plays, 79 yards, 4:33.

Statistics	UTPB	TSU
First downs	21	17
Total yards	359	377
Rushing yards	185	88
Passing yards	174	289
Turnovers	4	0
Time of possession	30:40	29:20

Team	Category	Player	Statistics
UT Permian Basin	Passing	Caden Coots	20/38, 174 yards, TD, 2 INT
UT Permian Basin	Rushing	Brandon Infiesto	22 rushes, 143 yards, 2 TD
UT Permian Basin	Receiving	Terrell Davidson	5 receptions, 55 yards
Tarleton State	Passing	Zed Woerner	17/24, 289 yards, 4 TD
Tarleton State	Rushing	Joseph Sadler	13 rushes, 37 yards, TD
Tarleton State	Receiving	Del'Michael High	6 receptions, 153 yards, 2 TD

=== Eastern New Mexico ===
Eastern New Mexico Greyhounds at UT Permian Basin Falcons – Game summary

Quarter	1	2	3	4	Total
Greyhounds	7	3	14	10	34
Falcons	0	3	0	0	3

at Ratliff Stadium, Odessa, Texas

- Date: October 1
- Game time: 7:00 p.m. CDT
- Game attendance: 6,879
- Referee: Joe Horn
- Box score, Recap

Game information
First quarter
- ENMU – Tayshaun Gray 9-yard run (Bailey Hale kick), 8:32. Greyhounds 7–0. Drive: 12 plays, 81 yards, 6:28.

Second quarter

- UTPB – Bailey Giffen 36-yard field goal, 9:05. Greyhounds 7–3. Drive: 9 plays, 37 yards, 3:15.
- ENMU – Bailey Hale 47-yard field goal, 0:00. Greyhounds 10–3. Drive: 3 plays, 6 yards, 0:19.

Third quarter

- ENMU – Wyatt Strand 8-yard run (Bailey Hale kick), 8:31. Greyhounds 17–3. Drive: 3 plays, 59 yards, 1:14.
- ENMU – Wyatt Strand 6-yard run (Bailey Hale kick), 1:10. Greyhounds 24–3. Drive: 15 plays, 73 yards, 6:32.

Fourth quarter

- ENMU – Wyatt Strand 24-yard run (Bailey Hale kick), 13:25. Greyhounds 31–3. Drive: 5 plays, 61 yards, 1:41.
- ENMU – Bailey Hale 40-yard field goal, 5:12. Greyhounds 34–3. Drive: 7 plays, 75 yards, 3:43.

Statistics	ENMU	UTPB
First downs	26	11
Total yards	524	208
Rushing yards	251	61
Passing yards	273	147
Turnovers	1	1
Time of possession	40:00	20:00

Team	Category	Player	Statistics
Eastern New Mexico	Passing	Wyatt Strand	12/19, 260 yards, INT
Eastern New Mexico	Rushing	Wyatt Strand	21 rushes, 105 yards, 3 TD
Eastern New Mexico	Receiving	Aaron Johnson	9 receptions, 139 yards
UT Permian Basin	Passing	Kameron Mathis	12/29, 147 yards
UT Permian Basin	Rushing	Brandon Infiesto	14 rushes, 66 yards
UT Permian Basin	Receiving	Jake Anglin	3 receptions, 57 yards

=== At Texas A&M–Kingsville ===
UT Permian Basin Falcons at Texas A&M–Kingsville Javelinas – Game summary

Quarter	1	2	3	4	Total
Falcons	0	0	7	0	7
Javelinas	14	14	21	7	56

at Javelina Stadium, Kingsville, Texas

- Date: October 15
- Game time: 7:00 p.m. CDT
- Game weather: Temperature: 83 °F (28 °C) • Weather: Sunny and humid • Wind: SE 13 MPH
- Game attendance: 11,333
- Referee: Marcus Thomas
- Box score, Recap

Game information
First quarter
- TAMUK – Jordan Thomas 36-yard pass from Myles Carr (Julio de la Garza kick), 11:44. Javelinas 7–0. Drive: 8 plays, 80 yards, 3:16.
- TAMUK – Nick Pelrean 4-yard pass from Myles Carr (Julio de la Garza kick), 3:24. Javelinas 14–0. Drive: 9 plays, 64 yards, 5:00.

Second quarter

- TAMUK – Luis Lopez 4-yard run (Julio de la Garza kick), 7:35. Javelinas 21–0. Drive: 11 plays, 67 yards, 5:39.
- TAMUK – Torrey Thomas 5-yard pass from Myles Carr (Julio de la Garza kick), 0:14. Javelinas 28–0. Drive: 10 plays, 68 yards, 2:26.

Third quarter

- UTPB – Marquis Simmons 2-yard run (Bailey Giffen kick), 10:45. Javelinas 28–7. Drive: 11 plays, 75 yards, 4:15.
- TAMUK – Luis Lopez 2-yard run (Julio de la Garza kick), 6:38. Javelinas 35–7. Drive: 8 plays, 63 yards, 3:59.
- TAMUK – Nick Pelrean 3-yard run (Julio de la Garza kick), 3:16. Javelinas 42–7. Drive: 1 play, 3 yards, 0:13.
- TAMUK – Anthony Autry 18-yard pass from Myles Carr (Julio de la Garza kick), 3:03. Javelinas 49–7. Drive: 1 play, 18 yards, 0:05.

Fourth quarter

- TAMUK – Nick Pelrean 1-yard run (Julio de la Garza kick), 12:05. Javelinas 56–7. Drive: 9 plays, 83 yards, 4:21.

Statistics	UTPB	TAMUK
First downs	17	26
Total yards	208	490
Rushing yards	102	219
Passing yards	106	271
Turnovers	4	2
Time of possession	27:27	32:33

Team	Category	Player	Statistics
UT Permian Basin	Passing	Caden Coots	7/12, 89 yards, INT
UT Permian Basin	Rushing	Marquis Simmons	19 rushes, 75 yards, TD
UT Permian Basin	Receiving	Terrell Davidson	1 reception, 40 yards
Texas A&M–Kingsville	Passing	Myles Carr	19/28, 271 yards, 4 TD, 2 INT
Texas A&M–Kingsville	Rushing	Nick Pelrean	19 rushes, 82 yards, 2 TD
Texas A&M–Kingsville	Receiving	Jordan Thomas	5 receptions, 81 yards, TD

=== Oklahoma Panhandle State ===
Oklahoma Panhandle State Aggies at UT Permian Basin Falcons – Game summary

Quarter	1	2	3	4	Total
Aggies	21	0	14	19	54
Falcons	13	7	3	21	44

at Grande Communications Stadium, Midland, Texas

- Date: October 21
- Game time: 7:00 p.m. CDT
- Game attendance: 5,459
- Referee: Kenny Kelarek
- Box score, Recap

Game information
First quarter
- OPSU – Shane Truelove 7-yard run (Sterling Claphan kick), 14:27. Aggies 7–0. Drive: 5 plays, 56 yards, 0:33.
- OPSU – Rod Moore 6-yard run (Sterling Claphan kick), 11:21. Aggies 14–0. Drive: 3 plays, 77 yards, 0:51.
- UTPB – Jake Anglin 42-yard pass from Kameron Mathis (Bailey Giffen kick), 9:48. Aggies 14–7. Drive: 5 plays, 75 yards, 1:25.
- OPSU – Devyn Williams 22-yard pass from Shane Truelove (Sterling Claphan kick), 7:43. Aggies 21–7. Drive: 1 play, 22 yards, 0:06.
- UTPB – Jason McAfee 9-yard run (run failed), 4:08. Aggies 21–13. Drive: 10 plays, 80 yards, 3:28.

Second quarter

- UTPB – Marquis Simmons 5-yard run (Bailey Giffen kick), 3:39. Aggies 21–20. Drive: 9 plays, 78 yards, 2:44.

Third quarter

- OPSU – Devyn Williams 52-yard pass from Shane Truelove (Sterling Claphan kick), 11:14. Aggies 28–20. Drive: 1 play, 57 yards, 0:23.
- UTPB – Bailey Giffen 35-yard field goal, 6:23. Aggies 28–23. Drive: 12 plays, 44 yards, 4:44.
- OPSU – Andrew Hernandez 6-yard pass from Shane Truelove (Sterling Claphan kick), 3:04. Aggies 35–23. Drive: 8 plays, 81 yards, 3:11.

Fourth quarter

- UTPB – Mitchell Leonard 1-yard pass from Kameron Mathis (Kameron Mathis run), 13:37. Aggies 35–31. Drive: 12 plays, 60 yards, 4:19.
- OPSU – Brandon Trotter 10-yard pass from Shane Truelove (Sterling Claphan kick), 9:44. Aggies 42–31. Drive: 9 plays, 75 yards, 3:53.
- UTPB – Mitchell Leonard 45-yard pass from Kameron Mathis (Bailey Giffen kick), 9:27. Aggies 42–38. Drive: 1 play, 45 yards, 0:08.
- OPSU – Rod Moore 3-yard run (kick blocked), 7:34. Aggies 48–38. Drive: 6 plays, 75 yards, 1:53.
- UTPB – Kristian Brown 33-yard pass from Kameron Mathis (kick failed), 4:53. Aggies 48–44. Drive: 9 plays, 74 yards, 2:41.
- OPSU – Devyn Williams 7-yard run (kick failed), 1:34. Aggies 54–44. Drive: 8 plays, 69 yards, 3:19.

Statistics	OPSU	UTPB
First downs	33	31
Total yards	750	523
Rushing yards	140	201
Passing yards	610	322
Turnovers	0	2
Time of possession	30:24	29:36

Team	Category	Player	Statistics
Oklahoma Panhandle State	Passing	Shane Truelove	40/49, 610 yards, 4 TD
Oklahoma Panhandle State	Rushing	Rod Moore	16 rushes, 88 yards, 2 TD
Oklahoma Panhandle State	Receiving	Devyn Williams	10 receptions, 223 yards, 2 TD
UT Permian Basin	Passing	Kameron Mathis	27/49, 322 yards, 4 TD, 2 INT
UT Permian Basin	Rushing	Jordan Williams	15 rushes, 78 yards
UT Permian Basin	Receiving	Terrell Davidson	8 receptions, 85 yards

=== At No. 13 Midwestern State ===
UT Permian Basin Falcons at No. 13 Midwestern State Mustangs – Game summary

Quarter	1	2	3	4	Total
Falcons	0	7	7	7	21
No. 13 Mustangs	35	21	7	13	76

at Memorial Stadium, Wichita Falls, Texas

- Date: October 28
- Game time: 7:00 p.m. CDT
- Game attendance: 8,722
- Referee: Robert Newton
- Box score, Recap

Game information
First quarter
- MSU – Vincent Johnson 2-yard run (Tanner Graeber kick), 13:40. Mustangs 7–0. Drive: 2 plays, 63 yards, 0:34.
- MSU – Vincent Johnson 51-yard run (Tanner Graeber kick), 8:06. Mustangs 14–0. Drive: 6 plays, 71 yards, 2:12.
- MSU – DeAndre Black 67-yard punt return (Tanner Graeber kick), 5:25. Mustangs 21–0.
- MSU – Jordan Meyers 26-yard fumble return (Tanner Graeber kick), 5:11. Mustangs 28–0.
- MSU – Gary Farquhar 12-yard pass from Quade Coward (Tanner Graeber kick), 0:25. Mustangs 35–0. Drive: 6 plays, 58 yards, 1:45.

Second quarter

- MSU – Brandon Sampson 20-yard pass from Quade Coward (Tanner Graeber kick), 12:08. Mustangs 42–0. Drive: 4 plays, 72 yards, 1:54.
- MSU – Layton Rabb 4-yard run (Tanner Graeber kick), 8:09. Mustangs 49–0. Drive: 6 plays, 57 yards, 2:48.
- UTPB – Mitchell Leonard 9-yard pass from Kameron Mathis (Bailey Giffen kick), 3:54. Mustangs 49–7. Drive: 10 plays, 73 yards, 4:15.
- MSU – Quinton Childs 11-yard pass from Layton Rabb (Tanner Graeber kick), 0:47. Mustangs 56–7. Drive: 6 plays, 56 yards, 2:58.

Third quarter

- MSU – Breion Evans 5-yard pass from Layton Rabb (Tanner Graeber kick), 4:23. Mustangs 63–7. Drive: 11 plays, 77 yards, 4:26.
- UTPB – Jake Anglin 10-yard pass from Kameron Mathis (Bailey Giffen kick), 0:24. Mustangs 63–14. Drive: 11 plays, 75 yards, 3:59.

Fourth quarter

- MSU – Nick Gabriel 11-yard run (kick blocked), 6:06. Mustangs 69–14. Drive: 2 plays, 37 yards, 0:25.
- UTPB – Marquis Simmons 4-yard run (Bailey Giffen kick), 1:41. Mustangs 69–21. Drive: 9 plays, 59 yards, 3:04.
- MSU – Quintin Childs 58-yard run (Tanner Graeber kick), 1:20. Mustangs 76–21. Drive: 1 play, 58 yards, 0:13.

Statistics	UTPB	MSU
First downs	21	28
Total yards	370	609
Rushing yards	154	350
Passing yards	216	259
Turnovers	2	1
Time of possession	35:02	24:58

Team	Category	Player	Statistics
UT Permian Basin	Passing	Kameron Mathis	19/38, 216 yards, 2 TD, INT
UT Permian Basin	Rushing	Jordan Williams	22 rushes, 94 yards
UT Permian Basin	Receiving	Jake Anglin	5 receptions, 64 yards, TD
Midwestern State	Passing	Quade Coward	5/9, 145 yards, 2 TD
Midwestern State	Rushing	Nicholas Gabriel	17 rushes, 121 yards, TD
Midwestern State	Receiving	Breion Evans	3 receptions, 78 yards, TD

=== No. 8 Texas A&M–Commerce ===
No. 8 Texas A&M–Commerce Lions at UT Permian Basin Falcons – Game summary

Quarter	1	2	3	4	Total
No. 8 Lions	27	17	14	0	58
Falcons	0	7	14	0	21

at Ratliff Stadium, Odessa, Texas

- Date: November 5
- Game time: 7:00 p.m. CST
- Game attendance: 7,000
- Box score, Recap

Game information
First quarter
- TAMUC – Vincent Hobbs 23-yard pass from Luis Perez (Kristov Martinez kick), 12:28. Lions 7–0. Drive: 1 play, 23 yards, 0:10.
- TAMUC – Vincent Hobbs 42-yard pass from Luis Perez (Kristov Martinez kick), 8:55. Lions 14–0. Drive: 4 plays, 53 yards, 1:46.
- TAMUC – Reggie Kincaid 15-yard blocked punt return (Kristov Martinez kick), 6:24. Lions 21–0.
- TAMUC – Buck Wilson 20-yard pass from Luis Perez (kick failed), 0:15. Lions 27–0. Drive: 3 plays, 43 yards, 1:03.

Second quarter

- TAMUC – Kristov Martinez 24-yard field goal, 12:27. Lions 30–0. Drive: 5 plays, 38 yards, 1:52.
- TAMUC – Ovie Urevbu 2-yard pass from Luis Perez (Kristov Martinez kick), 8:13. Lions 37–0. Drive: 5 plays, 55 yards, 1:15.
- UTPB – Corin Brooks 0-yard fumble return (Bailey Giffin kick), 3:47. Lions 37–7.
- TAMUC – D'Arthur Cowan 8-yard pass from Luis Perez (Kristov Martinez kick), 2:26. Lions 44–7. Drive: 4 plays, 55 yards, 1:16.

Third quarter

- TAMUC – Ovie Urevbu 1-yard run (Kristov Martinez kick), 9:54. Lions 51–7. Drive: 9 plays, 91 yards, 2:31.
- UTPB – Marquis Simmons 1-yard run (Bailey Giffin kick), 5:54. Lions 51–14. Drive: 10 plays, 82 yards, 3:55.
- TAMUC – Hayden Marsh 48-yard pass from Gabriel Rodriguez (Kristov Martinez kick), 5:43. Lions 58–14. Drive: 1 play, 48 yards, 0:08.
- UTPB – Mitchell Leonard 62-yard pass from Kameron Mathis (Bailey Giffin kick), 4:04. Lions 58–21. Drive: 5 plays, 79 yards, 1:37.

Fourth quarter

- No scoring plays

Statistics	TAMUC	UTPB
First downs	24	15
Total yards	591	344
Rushing yards	133	66
Passing yards	458	278
Turnovers	1	2
Time of possession	19:54	25:06

Team	Category	Player	Statistics
Texas A&M–Commerce	Passing	Luis Perez	18/25, 273 yards, 5 TD
Texas A&M–Commerce	Rushing	Ovie Urevbu	8 rushes, 85 yards, TD
Texas A&M–Commerce	Receiving	Chris Chumley	5 receptions, 92 yards
UT Permian Basin	Passing	Kameron Mathis	18/35, 278 yards, TD, INT
UT Permian Basin	Rushing	Marquis Simmons	13 rushes, 30 yards, TD
UT Permian Basin	Receiving	Mitchell Leonard	5 receptions, 111 yards, TD

=== At Angelo State ===
UT Permian Basin Falcons at Angelo State Rams – Game summary

Quarter	1	2	3	4	Total
Falcons	7	0	7	7	21
Rams	35	14	14	7	70

at LeGrand Sports Complex, San Angelo, Texas

- Date: November 12
- Game time: 6:00 p.m. CST
- Game attendance: 3,148
- Referee: Jarvis Walker
- Box score, Recap

Game information
First quarter
- ASU – Trey Green 2-yard run (Connor Flanigan kick), 13:32. Rams 7–0. Drive: 4 plays, 68 yards, 1:28.
- UTPB – Marquis Simmons 3-yard run (Bailey Giffen kick), 12:12. Tied 7–7. Drive: 4 plays, 65 yards, 1:20.
- ASU – Josh Stevens 11-yard run (Connor Flanigan kick), 10:16. Rams 14–7. Drive: 4 plays, 20 yards, 1:44.
- ASU – Lawson Ayo 47-yard pass from Jake Faber (Connor Flanigan kick), 7:34. Rams 21–7. Drive: 4 plays, 63 yards, 1:26.
- ASU – Mark Munson 99-yard pass from Jake Faber (Connor Flanigan kick), 5:39. Rams 28–7. Drive: 1 play, 99 yards, 0:13.
- ASU – Donovan Thompson 42-yard pass from Lawton Ayo (Connor Flanigan kick), 3:48. Rams 35–7. Drive: 1 play, 42 yards, 0:08.

Second quarter

- ASU – Jake Faber 2-yard run (Connor Flanigan kick), 13:22. Rams 42–7. Drive: 5 plays, 15 yards, 2:00.
- ASU – Ronald Winston 48-yard run (Connor Flanigan kick), 11:21. Rams 49–7. Drive: 3 plays, 63 yards, 0:58.

Third quarter

- UTPB – Ben Galaviz 16-yard pass from Kameron Mathis (Bailey Giffen kick), 13:29. Rams 49–14. Drive: 4 plays, 61 yards, 1:22.
- ASU – Mark Munson 5-yard pass from Jake Faber (Connor Flanigan kick), 8:39. Rams 56–14. Drive: 10 plays, 63 yards, 4:50.
- ASU – Jake Faber 23-yard run (Connor Flanigan kick), 6:09. Rams 63–14. Drive: 1 play, 23 yards, 0:06.

Fourth quarter

- ASU – Jake Faber 9-yard run (Connor Flanigan kick), 12:46. Rams 70–14. Drive: 3 plays, 23 yards, 1:14.
- UTPB – Mitchell Leonard 33-yard pass from Kameron Mathis (Bailey Giffen kick), 5:47. Rams 70–21. Drive: 8 plays, 57 yards, 3:16.

Statistics	UTPB	ASU
First downs	20	26
Total yards	440	580
Rushing yards	37	258
Passing yards	403	322
Turnovers	4	1
Time of possession	28:57	31:03

Team	Category	Player	Statistics
UT Permian Basin	Passing	Kameron Mathis	22/51, 403 yards, 2 TD, 2 INT
UT Permian Basin	Rushing	Marquis Simmons	13 rushes, 51 yards, TD
UT Permian Basin	Receiving	Mitchell Leonard	9 receptions, 215 yards, TD
Angelo State	Passing	Jake Faber	15/22, 276 yards, 3 TD, INT
Angelo State	Rushing	Jake Faber	11 rushes, 94 yards, 3 TD
Angelo State	Receiving	Mark Munson	2 receptions, 104 yards, 2 TD

== Statistics ==
=== Scoring ===
Scores against non-conference opponents

	1	2	3	4	Total
Opponents	6	6	15	13	40
UT Permian Basin	7	24	24	21	76

Scores against the Lone Star Conference

	1	2	3	4	Total
Opponents	183	114	131	84	512
UT Permian Basin	37	37	45	49	168

Scores against all opponents

	1	2	3	4	Total
Opponents	189	120	146	97	552
UT Permian Basin	44	61	69	70	244

=== Offense ===
Passing statistics
#	POS	NAME	CMP	ATT	YDS	CMP%	AVG	LONG	TD	INT
4	QB	Kameron Mathis	162	335	2,078	48.4	12.8	67	15	10
16	QB	Caden Coots	39	77	385	50.6	9.9	40	2	5
3	QB	Aaron Swain	1	1	4	100.0	4.0	4	0	0
5	WR	Kristian Brown	0	2	0	0.0	0.0	0	0	0
		TOTALS	202	415	2,467	48.7	12.2	67	17	15
