= Oklahoma Panhandle State Aggies =

- University: Oklahoma Panhandle State University
- Nickname: Aggies
- Association: NAIA
- Conference: Sooner Athletic Conference
- Athletic director: Victor Esparza
- Location: Goodwell, Oklahoma
- Varsity teams: 17 (7 men's, 7 women's, 3 co-ed)
- Football stadium: Carl Wooten Field
- Basketball arena: Oscar Williams Field House
- Baseball stadium: Carroll Gribble Field
- Softball stadium: Jim Quimby Field
- Soccer stadium: Carl Wooten Field
- Volleyball arena: Oscar Williams Field House
- Colors: Navy blue and red
- Website: www.opsuaggies.com

The Oklahoma Panhandle State Aggies (or OPSU Aggies) are the athletic teams that represent Oklahoma Panhandle State University, located in Goodwell, Oklahoma, in intercollegiate sports as a member of the National Association of Intercollegiate Athletics (NAIA), primarily competing in the Sooner Athletic Conference (SAC) for most of its sports since the 2017–18 academic year. The Aggies previously competed in the Heartland Conference of the NCAA Division II ranks from 2002–03 to 2016–17.

== Varsity teams ==
OPSU competes in 17 intercollegiate varsity sports:

Men's sports	Women's sports
Baseball	Basketball
Basketball	Cross country
Cross country	Golf
Football	Soccer
Golf	Softball
Soccer	Track and field
Track and field	Volleyball
Co-ed sports
Equestrian (Note: Not NAIA programs.)
Rodeo
Shooting

=== Football ===
The football team plays at Carl Wooten Field and at one point competed in the Central States Football League (CSFL) until after the 2017 fall season. Previously, the Aggies competed in the NCAA Division II Lone Star Conference during the 2016 fall season. In the early nineties, OPSU Aggies football was known as a football powerhouse in the NAIA, where it competed in the Oklahoma Intercollegiate Conference (OIC) through the 1996 season, after which it folded; the Aggies subsequently became an NCAA Division II independent. The program has recently had some success thanks to the late Mike Wyatt (2007–2010). The 2010 team produced the Aggie football program's first winning season since 2004, going 6–5. Russell Gaskamp, coach from 2012 to 2018, set new records in player involvement in community service activities.

=== Soccer ===
The Aggies Men's Soccer was founded on April 1, 2019. The team practices and plays on campus at Anchor D Stadium at Carl Wooten Field. In their inaugural season, the men finished with an overall record of 9-6-2, including a conference record of 4-4-1. The men achieved a berth into the Sooner Athletic Conference (SAC) conference tournament quarterfinal, where they fell (2-1) in overtime to eventual conference tournament finalist Science & Arts (OK).

=== Rodeo ===
A point of pride for OPSU is its men's and women's rodeo teams. The school is a member of the Central Plains Region of the National Intercollegiate Rodeo Association (NIRA) and has won several regional and national championships in the sport. The men's team won national championships in 1997, 1998, 2000, 2004, 2013, 2017, and 2018. As part of their scholarship package, rodeo team members may receive lodging in special housing and stalls for their animals.

== Facilities ==
=== Main facilities ===
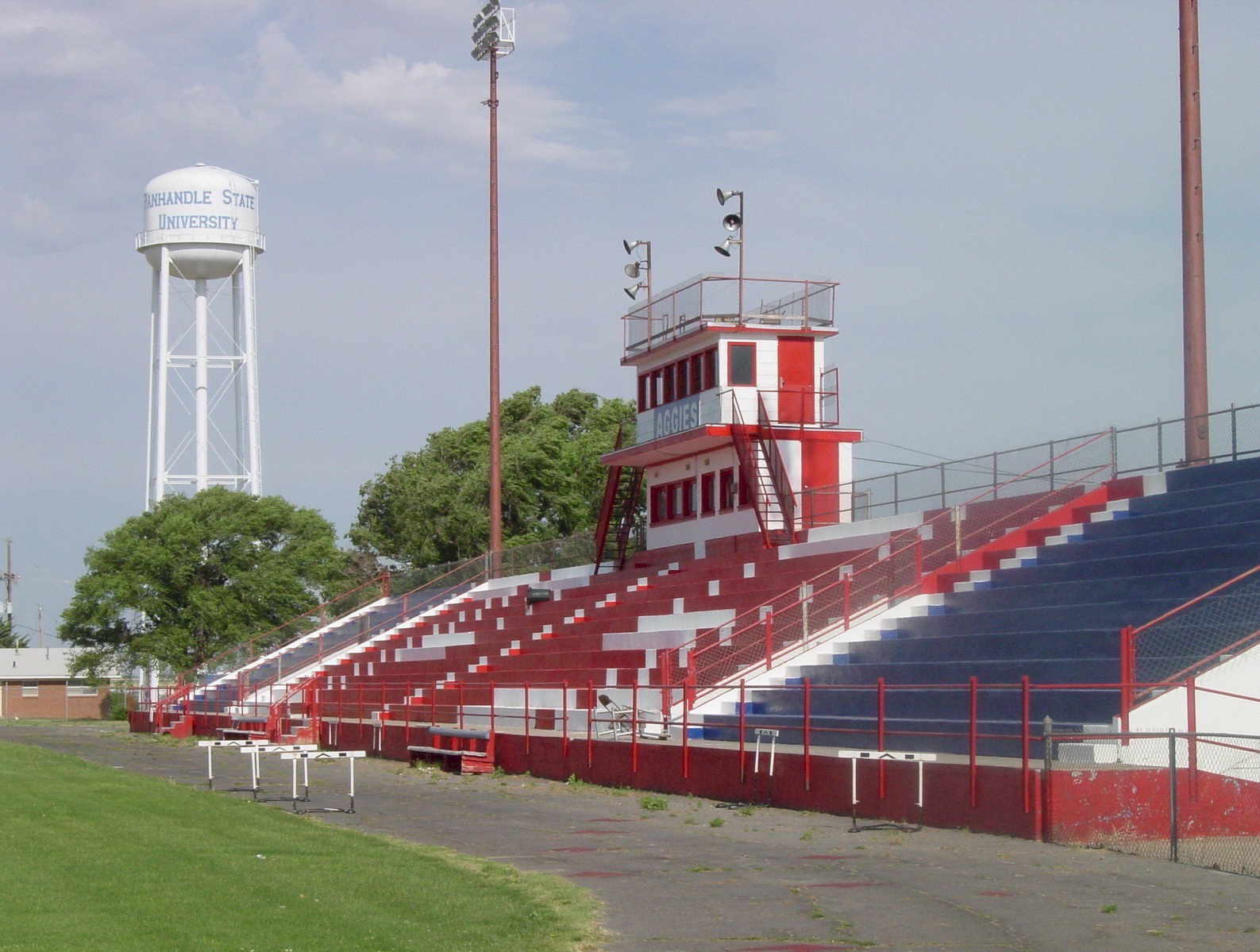
Carl Wooten Field, football and soccer venue

Venue	Sport(s)	Ref.
Carl Wooten Field (Note: Fullname: "Anchor D Stadium at Carl Wooten Field".)	Football; Soccer	
Oscar Williams Field House (Note: Fullname: "Anchor D Arena at Oscar Williams Field House".)	Basketball; Volleyball	
Carroll Gribble Field	Baseball	
Jim Quimby Field	Softball	
Lynn Gardner Arena	Rodeo	
Sunhet Hills Club (Note: Not owned by the university.)	Golf	

=== Other facilities ===
The Aggies Athletics Building was renovated on the backside of the McKee Library on campus, in 2019. This building consists of a two levels. The main floor houses the offices of the Aggies athletic support staff, conference room and team meeting room which includes a stage, 3 projector screens and 120 theater quality leather seats. On the second level, are various offices of coaching staff members.

Renovated in 2019, the Aggies sports teams have a sports specific strength and conditioning gym to use on a daily basis. With more than eight different racks and dead lift platforms and various other equipment, each program has enough space for large group workouts.
