= Carl Wooten Field =

University stadium in Goodwell, Oklahoma

Coordinates: 36.591799°N 101.638888°W

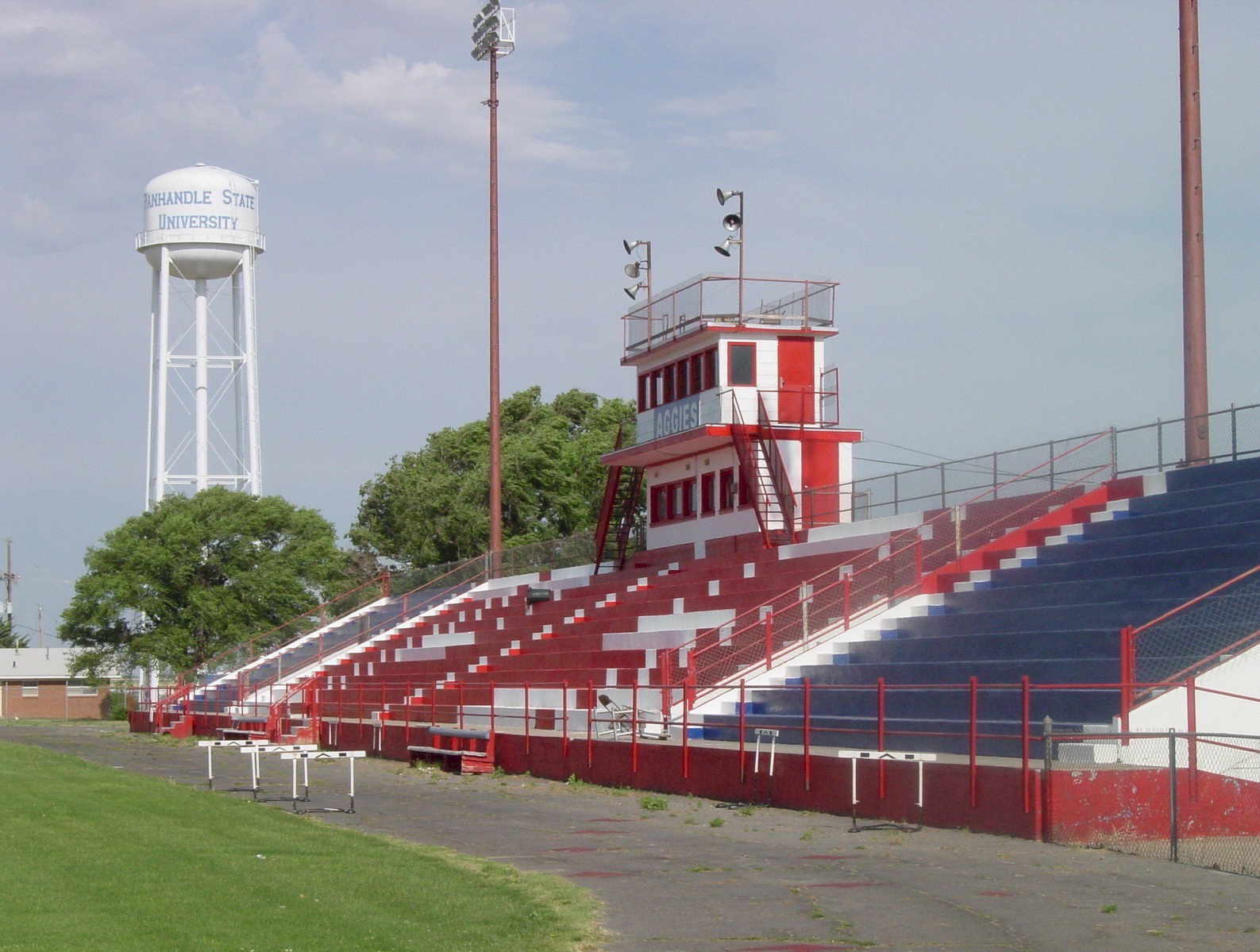
- Interactive map of Carl Wooten Field
- Location: Goodwell, Oklahoma
- Owner: Oklahoma Panhandle State University
- Operator: OPSU
- Capacity: 5,000
- Surface: Natural Grass

Tenants
- OPSU football OPSU athletics

Carl Wooten Field is a stadium in Goodwell, Oklahoma, on the campus of Oklahoma Panhandle State University. Carl Wooten Field is the home stadium for PSU's American football and track and field teams. It has also hosted local soccer matches.

The stadium has a 5,000-spectator capacity; the seats are mostly located in the main stand. The main stand is colored red, white, and blue and reads "OPSU" in white letters which cover the stand's central area from top to bottom.
