= 2016 NCAA Division II Football Championship Game =

2016 NCAA Division II Football Championship
North Alabama Lions	Northwest Missouri State Bearcats
(11–1)	(14–0)
Gulf South	MIAA
3	29
Head coach: Bobby Wallace	Head coach: Adam Dorrel
Seed 3	Seed 1
	1	2	3	4	Total
North Alabama	0	3	0	0	3
Northwest Missouri State	0	7	7	15	29
- Date: December 17, 2016
- Season: 2016
- Stadium: Children's Mercy Park
- Location: Kansas City, Kansas
- Referee: Bob Rose
- Attendance: 9,576

United States TV coverage
- Network: ESPN2

The 2016 NCAA Division II Football Championship Game was a postseason college football game that determined a national champion in NCAA Division II for the 2016 season. It was played at Children's Mercy Park in Kansas City, Kansas, on December 17, 2016, with kickoff at 4:00 p.m. EST (3:00 p.m. local CST), and television coverage on ESPN2.

== Teams ==
The participants of the 2016 NCAA Division II Football Championship Game were the finalists of the 2016 Division II Playoffs, which began with four 7-team brackets to determine super region champions, who then qualified for the national semifinals. The game featured the winners of those national semifinal games: No. 3 seed North Alabama and No. 1 seed Northwest Missouri State. This was the third meeting between the two teams; entering the game, Northwest Missouri State led the series 2–0. This was the Bearcats' tenth championship game appearance, having won 5, while the Lions were making their fifth appearance, having won 3. Additionally, the Bearcats entered the game as the defending national champions and were seeking to extend their streak to having won 3 of the last 4 national titles.

=== National semifinals ===
Super region champions were seeded 1 to 4 for the national semifinals.

Semifinals; December 10; Hosted by higher seeded team
1	Northwest Missouri State	35
4	Ferris State	20
2	Shepherd	13
3	North Alabama	23

National Championship; December 17; Children's Mercy Park, Kansas City, KS
1	Northwest Missouri State	29
3	North Alabama	3

== Game summary ==
2016 NCAA Division II Football Championship Game

Quarter	1	2	3	4	Total
No. 3 North Alabama	0	3	0	0	3
No. 1 Northwest Missouri State	0	7	7	15	29

at Children's Mercy Park • Kansas City, Kansas

- Date: Saturday, December 17, 2016
- Game time: 4:00 p.m. EST (3:00 p.m. CST)
- Game weather: Snowy • Temperature: 13 °F (−11 °C) • Wind: NNW 17 mph
- Game attendance: 9,576
- Referee: Bob Rose
- TV announcers (ESPN2): Dave Neal (play-by-play), Tom Luginbill (analyst), Olivia Harlan (sideline)

Game information

First Quarter
No scoring
Second Quarter

- (0:58) NWMS – Randy Schmidt 7 yard pass to Jordan Grove, Simon Mathiesen kick (Drive: 8 plays, 57 yards, 3:53; Northwest Missouri State 7–0)
- (0:04) UNA – Kevin Henke 21 yard field goal (Drive: 7 plays, 60 yards, 0:53; Northwest Missouri State 7–3)

Third Quarter

- (5:57) NWMS – Phil Jackson 2 yard rush, Simon Mathiesen kick (Drive: 7 plays, 40 yards, 2:44; Northwest Missouri State 14–3)

Fourth Quarter

- (8:14) NWMS – North Alabama fumbled out of the end zone, safety (Northwest Missouri State 16–3)
- (6:12) NWMS – Kyle Zimmerman 13 yard pass to Shane Williams, 2-point pass failed (Drive: 4 plays, 41 yards, 1:53; Northwest Missouri State 22–3)
- (0:57) NWMS – Phil Jackson 10 yard rush, Simon Mathiesen kick (Drive: 6 plays, 35 yards, 3:20; Northwest Missouri State 29–3)

=== Statistics ===
Statistics	UNA	NWMS
First downs	14	15
Plays–yards	74–201	74–338
Rushes–yards	33–22	40–226
Passing yards	179	112
Passing: Comp–Att–Int	15–41–1	18–34–1
Time of possession	27:05	32:55

Team	Category	Player	Statistics
North Alabama	Passing	Jacob Tucker	15/41, 179 yards, 1 INT
North Alabama	Rushing	Ray Beasley	4 carries, 29 yards
North Alabama	Receiving	Julius Jones	4 receptions, 82 yards
Northwest Missouri State	Passing	Kyle Zimmerman	13/26, 100 yards, 1 TD, 1 INT
Northwest Missouri State	Rushing	Randy Schmidt	14 carries, 96 yards
Northwest Missouri State	Receiving	Jordan Grove	6 receptions, 27 yards, 1 TD
