= 2016 West Florida Argonauts football team =

American college football season

2016 West Florida Argonauts football
- Conference: Gulf South Conference
- Record: 5–6 (3–5 GSC)
- Head coach: Pete Shinnick (1st season)
- Offensive coordinator: Jammie Deese (1st season)
- Offensive scheme: Multiple
- Defensive coordinator: Cory Sanders (1st season)
- Base defense: 4–3
- Home stadium: Blue Wahoos Stadium

2016 Gulf South Conference football standings
	Conf.			Overall
Team	W		L	W		L
No. 2 North Alabama $^	7	–	0	11	–	2
No. 18 Valdosta State ^	6	–	2	8	–	3
West Alabama	6	–	2	7	–	4
Florida Tech ^	5	–	2	8	–	3
West Georgia	4	–	4	7	–	4
West Florida	3	–	5	5	–	6
Delta State †	3	–	5	4	–	6
Mississippi College	1	–	7	3	–	7
Shorter	0	–	8	0	–	11
$ – Conference champion; ^ – NCAA Division II playoff participant; † – Delta State's record is officially listed as 2–8 (1–7) due to the use of ineligible players in two wins, but the opponents are not credited with wins.; Rankings from AFCA poll

The 2016 West Florida Argonauts football team represented the University of West Florida in the 2016 NCAA Division II football season. They were led by head coach Pete Shinnick, who was in his first season at West Florida for the team's inaugural season. The Argonauts played their home games at Blue Wahoos Stadium and were members of the Gulf South Conference. They finished the season with a record of 5 wins and 6 losses (5–6 overall, 3–5 in the GSC), defeating one top 25 ranked team and were not invited in the 2016 playoffs.

== Schedule ==
West Florida announced its 2016 football schedule on August 10, 2015. The schedule consists of 5 home and 6 away games in the regular season. The Argos will host GSC foes Shorter, West Alabama, Florida Tech, and West Georgia, and will travel to Delta State, Mississippi College, North Alabama, and Valdosta State.

The Argonauts will host only one non-conference game against Missouri S&T of the Great Lakes Valley Conference and travel to two against Ave Maria of the Sun Conference and Chowan of the Central Intercollegiate Athletic Association.

Date	Time	Opponent	Site	TV	Result	Attendance
September 3	12:00 p.m	at Ave Maria*	AMU Football Field; Ave Maria, FL		W 45–0	760
September 10	6:00 p.m.	Missouri S&T*	Blue Wahoos Stadium; Pensacola, FL	BLAB TV	W 45–28	6,288
September 17	6:00 p.m.	at Chowan*	Garrison Stadium; Murfreesboro, NC		L 28–35	2,374
September 24	6:00 p.m.	at Valdosta State	Bazemore–Hyder Stadium; Valdosta, GA		L 28–40	6,810
October 1	6:00 p.m.	No. 16 Florida Tech	Blue Wahoos Stadium; Pensacola, FL	ASN	W 42–39	6,588
October 8	2:00 p.m.	at Mississippi College	Robinson-Hale Stadium; Clinton, MS	ESPN3	W 42–28	2,468
October 15	2:00 p.m.	at Delta State	McCool Stadium; Cleveland, MS		L 51–55	7,002
October 22	12:00 p.m.	Shorter^{†}	Blue Wahoos Stadium; Pensacola, FL	ESPN3	W 36–0	6,588
October 29	12:00 p.m.	West Alabama	Blue Wahoos Stadium; Pensacola, FL	BLAB TV	L 21–45	6,088
November 5	1:30 p.m.	at No. 7 North Alabama	Braly Municipal Stadium; Florence, Alabama		L 3–51	10,489
November 12	12:00 p.m.	West Georgia	Blue Wahoos Stadium; Pensacola, FL	BLAB TV	L 0–69	6,088
*Non-conference game; ^{†}Homecoming; Rankings from AFCA Poll released prior to the game; All times are in Central time
