= West Alabama Tigers =

- University: University of West Alabama
- NCAA: Division II
- Conference: Gulf South (primary)
- Athletic director: Brent Gilliland
- Location: Livingston, Alabama
- Varsity teams: 16 (8 men's, 8 women's)
- Football stadium: Tiger Stadium
- Basketball arena: Pruitt Hall Gymnasium
- Baseball stadium: Tartt Field
- Softball stadium: UWA Softball Complex
- Soccer field: Tiger Stadium
- Tennis venue: Vaughan Tennis Complex
- Nickname: Tigers
- Colors: Red and white
- Mascot: Luie the Tiger
- Fight song: The Fight Song
- Website: uwaathletics.com
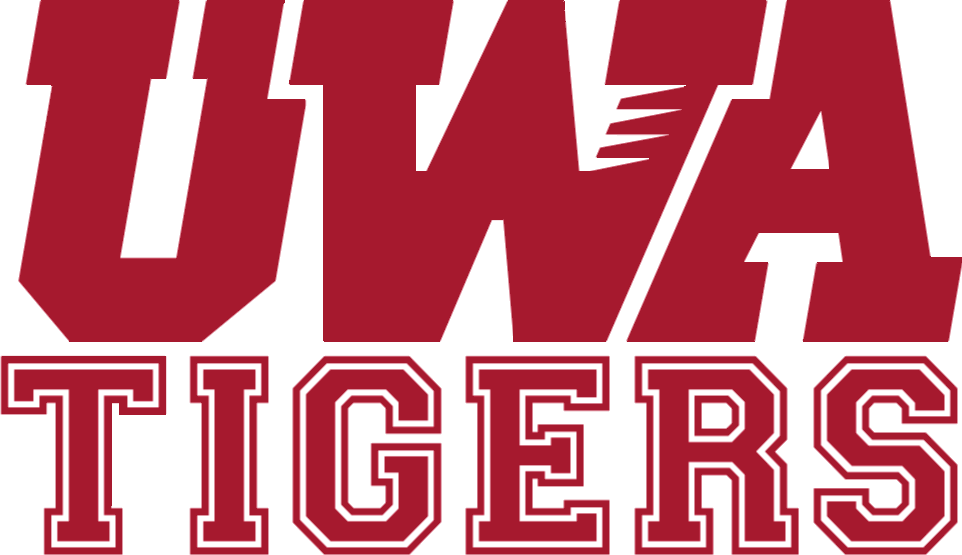

The West Alabama Tigers are the athletic teams that represent the University of West Alabama, located in Livingston, Alabama, in intercollegiate sports at the Division II level of the National Collegiate Athletic Association (NCAA). The Tigers have primarily competed in the Gulf South Conference since the 1970–71 academic year. Men's and women's rodeo compete as affiliate members in the Ozark Region of the National Intercollegiate Rodeo Association.

West Alabama's main rivals include North Alabama and Delta State. The rivalry with North Alabama is especially heated as the two compete annually in most sports. Other rivals include Alabama-Huntsville, Montevallo, Valdosta State, West Florida, and West Georgia.

West Alabama competes in 16 intercollegiate varsity sports. Men's sports include baseball, basketball, cross country, football, rodeo, soccer, tennis, and outdoor track; while women's sports include basketball, cross country, rodeo, soccer, softball, tennis, outdoor track, and volleyball.

== Conference affiliations ==
NCAA

- Gulf South Conference (1970–present)

== Varsity teams ==
=== Football ===
West Alabama's football team was first fielded in 1931 when the school was known as Livingston State Teachers College. However, intercollegiate competition for all the university's athletics was not scheduled until seven years later. In 1938, they competed in four games against Marion Institute, Jacksonville State, Demopolis A.S, and Troy State, all of whom were local teams. LSTC finished the season 2-2. That year also marked the start of World War II which led to a decline in college enrollment across the United States. Therefore, LSTC fielded no athletic teams from 1942 to 1945. In 1944, Dr. William Wilson Hill became president of the university and instantly started recruiting students to enroll.

After a three-year hiatus, the football team returned to action under the guidance of new head coach E.G McCollum. They opened their season with the first of many future match-ups against Mississippi College, which resulted in a 24–14 loss. Also, that season, LSTC renewed its rivalry with eventual Gulf South Conference foes, Troy State and Delta State. The team concluded the season with a 6–3 record, and McCollum resigned to pursue a bigger opportunity elsewhere.

Following two dismal seasons from 1947 and 1948, LSTC hired former University of Alabama star Vaughn Mancha as the fourth head coach in team history. Mancha at the time was only 28 years old with no prior coaching experience. The former two-time All-American had also recently completed his first and only season in the NFL as a member of the Boston Yanks. In Mancha's first season, he led LSTC to a 13–6 win over Florida State. The team also concluded the regular season 7–1–1, which at the time marked the best record in school history. LSTC would go on to the Paper Bowl against Jacksonville State, but JSU won 12–7.

Until 1952, the Tigers played home games at Livingston High School. From then on, all their home games were played at Tiger Stadium, a 7,000-capacity stadium located on filled-in land that was previously known as "Crawdad Creek." The next season saw the team finish 6–3–1. During Mancha's third season, the team started off 2-4 but came back to end the season 5-5. This season was the last in Mancha's tenure at LSTC, after which he took over as defensive coordinator at Florida State. Mancha departed with an 18-10-2 overall record.

The Tigers went 15 years without a winning season after Mancha's departure; the most successful season was 1965 when they finished 5–4. Their luck finally started to change after hiring Morris Higginbotham in 1967. Before coming to Livingston, he was one of the most successful high school coaches in Alabama, compiling a 111-27-8 record. The native of Birmingham, earned Alabama Collegiate Conference Coach of the Year honors for the efforts of his 1968 team that featured a 9–2 mark and an appearance in the Peanut Bowl in Dothan, Alabama. Higginbotham remained at the school for three seasons, leading the Tigers to a 19-9-2 record.

Higginbotham was succeeded by assistant head coach Mickey Andrews. Similar to former LU head coach, Vaughn Mancha, Andrews starred in football and baseball at the University of Alabama from 1961 to 1964 before being hired at the university in 1967. Andrews spent three seasons guiding the UWA football team, leading the Tigers to a 24-7-2 record during his tenure. The team also won their first and only championship in school history during the 1971 season defeating Arkansas Tech. LU's bid for a second consecutive NAIA National Championship came up short to Carson-Newman in the 1972 NAIA semi-final. The teams battled to a 7–7 tie, but a controversial tiebreaker ruling went in favor of Carson-Newman.

In 1973, Andrews became the second LU head coach to resign and accept the defensive coordinator position at Florida State. Once again, LU hired a coach from within the program: Andrews’ top assistant, Jim King. King, a native of Adamsville, Alabama, came to LU in 1970. In 1975, he led the Tigers to the NCAA playoffs with a 10–3 record. In the NCAA Quarter Finals, the team faced a tough task of taking on number one-ranked North Dakota. The game was nearly cancelled due to heavy snow. Nevertheless, LU prevailed in an upset. During the semi-finals, they faced a tough Northern Michigan team on national television. Although LU jumped out to a 10–0 lead, they fell short 28–26. King departed the team after compiling a 29-14-1 record in three seasons.

The hiring of Bobby Wallace in 2006 marked a new era within the football program. Before arriving in Livingston, he had served as the head coach at Temple University since 1997. Wallace's first head coaching stint came in the GSC when he was the head coach at the University of North Alabama from 1988 to 1997. During his time at UNA, he led the Lions to three consecutive national championships from 1993 to 1995 as his squads finished with an overall record of 41–1 in those three seasons. The 1995 team was selected as the "Best Team of the Quarter Century" in Division II. Wallace also led UNA to Gulf South Conference Championships during the 1993–95 seasons, while his Lions also qualified for the NCAA Division II Playoffs six times during his tenure. Over his 10 seasons at the helm, he compiled an overall mark of 82–36–1, and he also produced a total of 12 NFL players.

The Wallace Era began with UWA's first winning season in 14 years. The Tigers finished 6–5 on the season. UWA also ended several streaks picking up wins at Lambuth, against Southern Arkansas, and at Arkansas-Monticello. However, the team finished the 2007 season with a 1–9 record and posted a 4–7 record in 2008.

The 2009 season began with three consecutive victories including a televised home win over Arkansas Tech. Unfortunately, three consecutive losses followed. A couple of wins over #22 Delta State and Arkansas-Monticello put UWA back into the playoff race, but they lost to West Georgia the following week.

The season finale was against longtime rival and Wallace's former team, North Alabama. At the time, UNA was ranked number one in all the Division II polls. UWA sent the game to overtime after losing the lead they held throughout the game. After four overtimes, it appeared UNA was set to claim the victory until a forced fumble gave UWA the ball. From that, they took advantage and kicked the game-winning field goal. It was the first win for the Tigers at Braly Municipal Stadium in Florence since the 1987 season.

The NCAA rewarded UWA's efforts with a berth in the NCAA Division II playoffs. In the first round, the Tigers upset #20 Albany State 24–22 on the road. After falling behind early against #10 Carson-Newman, the Tigers mounted a rally but ultimately lost 59–41. The Tigers gathered an 8–5 record, the most wins since 1975, and had eight All-GSC honors. UWA posted a 5–1 record at Tiger Stadium, the best since 1985, and tallied the most wins over GSC opponents since 1981 with six. They received their first two rankings in school history at the end of the season. The AFCA placed them #21, while the D2Football.com poll placed them higher two spots at #19.

UWA entered the 2010 season ranked 12th nationally by USA Today. The team was also ranked 23rd in the Lindy's Preseason Top 25 poll and 24th in the Sporting News Preseason Top 25 poll. The UWA football team recorded its highest pre-season ranking since 1976 as the Tigers were selected second by the head coaches of the 2010 Gulf South Conference in the GSC Pre-Season Poll. West Alabama opened the season on August 28 against NAIA member Shorter in nearby Demopolis, Alabama. Tiger Stadium was renovated, and a synthetic surface was recently installed. The Tigers played their first contest on the new surface on September 18 against Lambuth but were narrowly defeated. UWA opened Gulf South Conference play with a home win over West Georgia but lost to Delta State on the road. After a 3–2 start, the Tigers reeled off three consecutive wins, including a last-second homecoming victory over Henderson State. It appeared the game had ended, but officials put a second back on the clock. Quarterback Deon Williams connected to wide receiver Gerald Worsham in the back of the endzone for the game-winner. The team lost back to back in the following two weeks before returning home to face Valdosta State in the season finale. The day before the contest, Bobby Wallace announced to his players that he would be stepping down as head coach upon the end of the season. After falling behind and trailing at the half, the Tigers upset the number 7-ranked Blazers to give Wallace a victory in his final game. The team notched its second win against Valdosta State and picked up their first win in the series since 1985. UWA finished the season 7–4 to earn consecutive winning seasons for the first time since 1991 and 1992. Deon Williams was recognized as one of 24 candidates for the Harlon Hill Trophy, the Division II equivalent to Division I's Heisman Trophy. Offensive coordinator Will Hall was named Bobby Wallace's successor a week after the season concluded. Bobby Wallace was inducted into the Division II Hall of Fame in December. The 2011 team went 8–4, beat DI foe Georgia State, and qualified for the NCAA DII tournament. The 2012 team went undefeated in Gulf South play (5–0) to claim the conference title. UWA defeated Miles College 41–7 in round one of the playoffs. The team lost at eventual national champion Valdosta State 49–21 in the second round. UWA finished 9–4.

=== Volleyball ===
The first known volleyball team for the University of West Alabama came in 1979. UWA struggled throughout the 1980s and early part of the 1990s. At this time, only season schedules beginning in 1994 are available. Under the direction of head coach Pam Gailbreath, the team won nine games that year. The following year, UWA improved on its previous season finishing at 17–18. In 1996, the Tigers reached an all-time high, going 32–14 to set a school record for wins. The next four seasons proved difficult for the Tigers as they did not get over the .500 point. Then, in 2001, UWA won 23 games to finish with a .575 winning percentage. They improved even more in 2002 when they went 25–13.

UWA started the 2007 campaign 18-0 and was the only Division II undefeated team in America. In response AVCA placed them at #25, the first ranking in the program's history. A sweep over Albany State broke the school record for most consecutive wins. They went on to finish the season 27–6 in head coach Ron Arenz's final year. UWA recorded eight conference wins, the most for the team since 2002. Although the season ended in the opening round of the GSC Tournament, the Tigers broke several school records throughout the season.

In 2008, UWA achieved a 22–11 record, and tssistant coach Tabitha Turner was promoted to head coach for 2009. UWA was picked to finish third in the annual preseason poll. After starting the season slow through 14 games, the Tigers reeled off a 16-match winning streak pushing their record to 25-5 and 5–0 in the GSC. It was the third consecutive season in which UWA had won at least 20 matches.

The team won the GSC East Division crown with a win at Valdosta State to close out regular season play. At the GSC Tournament, the Tigers fought back from a 2–1 deficit to top Arkansas Tech and advance to the semi-finals. In the semi-finals, the team blanked Harding in a sweep on their home court but then lost to West Florida. UWA finished the season 30-8 and 8–2 in GSC play. After the season, Tabitha Turner was selected by the AVCA Thirty Under 30 list for 2010. Turner was also named Co-Coach of the Year in the East Division. The 2010 season was a rebuilding year for the Tigers as the squad finished with a 10–21 overall record.

Jorday Lay was hired in February 2013 to replace interim head coach Mike Shearer. Lay came to UWA from Belhaven University, where he was named the 2012 Southern State Athletic Conference coach of the year after guiding the Blazers to a 27–9 regular season record, 9–5 in conference play. Combined with a pair of wins in the SSAC Tournament, Lay's team set the Belhaven record for victories in a season with 29.

=== Men's soccer ===
The University of West Alabama started a men's soccer program in the fall of 2012. The first head coach was Matthew Thorne. UWA men's soccer won their first game against Oakwood 7–1 in Livingston on 8/31/12. The team picked up conference wins over Delta State, Christian Brothers, and Alabama-Huntsville, Shorter, and Union twice. They finished 12–6 with an 8–4 mark in the GSC.

=== Women's soccer ===
The University of West Alabama introduced its first women's soccer program in 2011. Graeme Orr, a native of Eaglesham, Scotland has been announced as the school's first head coach. The first signing class was announced in March 2011 and had seven high school seniors and a pair of junior-college transfers.

In the 2011 season, UWA finished 6–12 with a conference win over Delta State. 2012 saw the team improve, going 7-8-3 with a 5-3-1 mark in the GSC with wins against Delta State, Christian Brothers, Shorter, Alabama-Huntsville, and West Georgia.

=== Men's basketball ===
The Tiger men's basketball team was originally formed in 1939, but their first unofficial season took place after World War II in 1945. From 1945 to 1955, the team was led by future UWA Athletic Hall of Famers Pop Wagoner, Jack Jones, and Milton Johnson. The UWA record book, however, counts 1956–1957 as the official first men's basketball season. Jones, who was a three-sport for UWA (then Livingston University) from 1947 to 1951, returned to the university to coach the basketball team in 1956. Although there were coaches before him, Jones is the first known head coach of Tiger men's basketball.

The team faced constant struggles under Jones. In his eight years at the helm, the 1956–57 season was the only one in which the team accomplished more than 10 wins. That season, they finished with an 11–10 record. At the conclusion of the 1962–63 season, Jones took a two-year hiatus from coaching before returning for one last season in 1965. During that hiatus, Travis Clark tried his hand at turning the team around. With the help of M.K Turk, Clark led the team to their second 11-win season in his first season. Turk led LU in scoring his junior and senior seasons. He was also named All-Conference twice. The 1964–65 season saw LU return to mediocrity as they finished 8–16. They recorded the same record during the following season, which was Jones’ last at the helm. He finished his coaching career at LU with a 56–113 record.

LU men's basketball underwent a drastic change with the hiring of future UWA Athletics Hall of Famer, Jack Powell, in 1966. In Powell's first two seasons as coach, the team made positive improvements, particularly after Bob Drake, Dave Harvey, Larry Cantrell and Butch Stafford jointed the team. Drake served two years as the Tiger team captain and was later an All-Alabama Collegiate Conference (ACC) selection. He made the All-ACC Tournament Team twice and was chosen for the All-Alabama Small College Team. During the 1969–70 season, LU recorded their first 16-win season. Later that season, they were crowned ACC tournament champions.

With the addition of Elton Reece in 1970, the team finished with a school record 21 wins and four losses. The mark still stands as the most single-season wins in West Alabama history, and it earned Powell Coach of the Year in the ACC and earned Coach of the Year honors from Alabama Small Colleges and Universities as well as NAIA District 27. Also that season, the Tigers won their second consecutive ACC crown. Stafford was named the ACC Tournament MVP. However, they were defeated in the NAIA District 27 finals. For the 1971–72 season, which turned out to be Powell's last as head coach, LU finished 15-8 and won their third straight ACC championship.

The team also returned to the NAIA District 27 finals where they lost again. Drake averaged 21.1 points per game in his senior campaign and made 166-of-205 free throws, which still stands as the second highest total for free throws made in a season at UWA. He also posted two 40-point games as a senior. Stafford was selected the first-ever GSC Player of the Year in basketball and garnered All-American honors. He finished his career with 1,143 points scored. Harvey is currently fifth all time in the UWA record books with 452 field goals made. Cantrell is the UWA all-time leader in rebound average with 16.35 and second all-time in rebounds with 785. Powell was selected as the first-ever Gulf South Conference Coach of the Year in basketball. After six seasons with LU, he retired from coaching with an 83–57 record. Powell's 83 wins is currently ranked third all time in the UWA record books. He is also ranked fourth all time in GSC coaching wins.

After Powell's retirement, LU men's basketball went through a heavy downslide. The team faced several coaching changes and dismal seasons. In addition, on January 14, 1978, the team had just defeated Nicholls State in a conference match-up when they learned head coach Ken Brackett died after a long battle with cancer. A few weeks prior, Brackett was forced to take a medical leave as his condition began to weaken. Artie McIntosh, who had been serving as the interim head coach in Brackett's absence, took over coaching duties for the remainder of that season. McIntosh, along with the trio of Rodney McKeever, Perry Smith and Cheyenne Jones, helped complete Brackett's dramatic turnaround of the team finishing 18–8. Prior to his arrival in 1976, the team had only won 22 total games in three seasons.

In Brackett's first season, the Tigers finished 10–16, their best record since the 1973–74 season. McKeever garnered First Team All-Gulf South Conference honors while Jones earned second team honors. The team as a whole finished second in the GSC with an 11–4 conference record. LU also went to the NCAA Division II Men's Basketball Tournament for the first in school history. The team opened tournament play in a South Regional match-up against Florida A&M University. AMU was heavily favored because of the game being played in Orlando, Florida; the Tigers ultimately lost 72–69. With the loss, the Tigers played in a consolation game against Augusta College which LU won 91–90.

After the season, LU hired Wichita State assistant head coach, Ed Murphy, as the new head coach and athletic director. With his signing of Tony Andre, Perry Smith and Cheyenne Jones, the team once again formed a big three and hoped to fill a void after McKeever's graduation. In his first season, Murphy kept up the previous season's momentum as the team finished 15-11 and third in the GSC. However, they did not return to the NCAA tournament. Jones was named the First Team All-Gulf Conference. Andre was named to the Second Team.

The following season, Murphy picked up his second major freshman acquisition with the signing of Will Cotchery. Cotchery allowed LU to immediately fill the presence left by Cheyenne Jones. However, the 1979-1980 campaign was less successful. Senior Perry Smith would later earn First Team All-GSC Conference honors for the first time in his career, but LU as a team finished fifth in the conference and 14–12 overall.

Murphy's third season at the helm started off with his third straight major freshman acquisition as he recruited Dennis Williams to play Tiger men's basketball. He also picked up Randy Terry, a prospect from Jones County Junior College, to replace Smith at shooting guard. Terry was a native of nearby Tuscaloosa and known for his shooting ability. Williams, Cotchery, Andre, and Terry formed a solid core that carried the team to a 19–9 season, and Cotchery and Andre received First Team All-GSC Conference honors. Williams was named the GSC Freshman of the Year, and Murphy was named the GSC Coach of the Year. Although the team was successful, they still finished third in the conference and failed to reach the NCAA tournament for a third straight season.

In the 1981–82 season, the team finished 20-10 and won the GSC championship for the first time in school history. Cotchery was named the tournament MVP. He also earned First Team All-GSC Conference honors along with teammates Randy Terry and Marvin Wesley. Murphy was once again named GSC Coach of the Year, and the conference championship earned LU their first trip back to the NCAA Division II Men's Basketball Tournament since 1978. In similar fashion to their last NCAA tournament trip, the South Regional was again hosted by a Florida school, this time Florida Southern.

The Tigers' first game was against Biscayne College, who was also a local team. Despite the crowd being heavily behind BC, this time around, LU was greatly prepared for the challenges and obstacles they faced. Cotchery and the gang fought from beginning to end as they walked away with a 75–72 victory. The victory earned the Tigers a regional match-up against host and defending Division II national champions. Both teams were locked in a defensive battle for most of the game. It eventually went into three overtimes, and FSU ultimately won 86–79.

The game was the last NCAA tournament appearance to date for LU. With the departures of Andre and Terry, Cotchery carried the team on his back during his senior season. The team finished with an 18–9 record and runner-up finish in the GSC. Cotchery earned another First Team conference honor. That season would also be the last at LU for Murphy, who resigned at the end of the 1982-1983 campaign to take over at GSC rival Delta State. He coached LU for five seasons. Murphy is currently ranked second in the school's record book with 86 wins coaching and 41 GSC victories.

Two years after Murphy's departure, former assistant coach Rick Reedy took over the program in time for the 1984–85 season. Former Tiger standout Tony Andre also joined him as an assistant coach. Reedy's first three seasons showed poor results, but the Tigers improved under him during the 1987–88 season. The team finished 18-9 and tied for fifth place in the GSC. Despite the talent, though, Reedy only had eight winning seasons during his 23 seasons as coach, and during his tenure, the team finished in the GSC top 3 only three times.

In 1993, the Gulf South Conference underwent a huge expansion with the addition of ten new members. The change divided the GSC into two separate divisions, East and West. For two years, the Tigers were a part of the West division. They moved to the East after Arkansas-Monticello, Southern Arkansas, Arkansas Tech, and Montevallo joined the conference in 1995. Also, Jacksonville State and Mississippi College departed, thus leaving the conference with 18 members. Reedy's best conference record came during 1992-1993 when they earned an 8–4 record and finished as the GSC runner-up. In the 1991–92 season, the Tigers earned the school's largest margin of victory with a 61-point win over Selma. The 2004–2005 team finished a game over .500 at 14–13, but this was the last winning season for the Tigers. In Reedy's final season, the team finished 10–17. Reedy's 23 seasons at the helm made him UWA's longest-tenured men's basketball coach. Upon retirement, he ranked first in the UWA history books with 276 overall wins and 116 of those coming in conference play.

After nearly a quarter century, Eddie McCarter was hired to take Reedy's place. McCarter's first recruiting class featured Ryan Cross and Daniel Scott. Both were on the list of Alabama's top players. However, academics put a damper in their recruitment. McCarter also brought along Roderick Ollie from UAB. All three were red-shirted their first season. Overall, the roster was made up of mostly new faces and a few holdovers from the Reedy era.

The McCarter era began on the road at Stillman where UWA registered an 88–82 win. However, with a lack of team chemistry and other issues, the team finished with a 10–17 mark. The Tigers saw improvement in McCarter's second season, but the team was still relatively new. Cross and fellow redshirt freshman Jacquezz Brown left the team, along with Ollie, Maurice Naylor, Glenn Miles, and Kevin Johnson. The biggest acquisition was Troy native Jason Swanson. Swanson had previously played at nearby Shelton State Community College where he was a two-year starter. The 6'7" forward averaged 16.8 points a game and was also known for his rebounding, an area McCarter heavily emphasized. Brian Murphy, the Tigers leading scorer in 2007–2008, suffered a torn ACL before the season and was given a medical redshirt. His injury left McCarter in need of a new go-to scorer. which he had hoped to find in newcomers Herman Mains, Jamaine Nance, Terrence Benson and Chris Davis.

Though the season was rocky, the Tigers finished the regular season 13-13 and clinched their first GSC tournament appearance since the 1997–98 season. The excitement was short lived as Harding eliminated UWA in the opening round. McCarter added nine and returned five for the 2009-2010 campaign. The team also featured three redshirt freshmen. McCarter also once again lost several key players to transfers, including Daniel Scott.

That season, the Tigers took the lead in almost every game they lost but were often defeated after their opponents staged late rallies. Swanson led the team in almost every category, and newcomers Richard Sirju and Alquan Mendenhall also performed well. The season also saw the emergence of redshirt freshman Ryan Fitch. Fitch broke into the starting lineup a couple games into the season. The Tigers concluded the season with a 13–14 record. However, after a loss to Alabama-Huntsville during the season's final game, UWA was eliminated from earning a second straight berth in the GSC tournament. Swanson earned First Team All-GSC honors, which occurred for the first team since 2005 when Stan Gill received the honor.

The 2010-2011 campaign opened with a home match-up against Carver Bible College. Alquan Mendenhall, Jonathan Griffin, Ryan Fitch, and Richard Dixon led the scoring as each topped double figures in the opening triumph. The Tigers dropped their first road game at Jacksonville State but posted consecutive home wins over Huntingdon and Concordia. UWA moved to 3-1 but endured a rough stretch to close out 2010. The team faced each team from the Gulf South Conference West Division and came away with a pair of wins. The men came up short to Georgia Southwestern to kick off 2011 in the second to last non-conference game of the season.

The Tigers went 4–6 to open conference play including a road thriller at West Florida. The win was the team's first season sweep of the Argonauts since 1996–1997. They stepped out of the GSC to face Oakwood and were victorious in that one, posting 90 points to rout their opponent. A few days later, the team beat West Georgia and concluded the season hosting Valdosta State. The Tigers fell by two points to finish their season 11–15 overall and 5–7 in the Gulf South Conference. In April 2011, the Department of Athletics hired Mike Newell to take over the program.

In July 2013, UWA hired Mark Downey from the University of Charleston. Downey won two Gulf South Conference championships while at Arkansas Tech and was a six-time coach of the year winner in nine seasons as a head coach. In only three seasons at Charleston, he compiled a 60–28 record and led the Golden Eagles to their first NCAA Tournament appearance since 2001. In nine seasons at Charleston (2010–2013), Arkansas Tech (2006–2010) and Independence Community College (1999–2001), Downey had a 184–92 record, averaged just over 20 wins per season, and had just one losing season. He has a 19–5 record in post-season NCAA Division II conference tournaments. Downey has coached in eight conference tournaments, reaching the finals five times and winning three conference titles.

=== Women's basketball ===
The first known season for the University of West Alabama women's basketball team is currently uncertain. However, detailed season results first became available for the 1978–79 season. That year, the Tigers struggled to a 5–16 mark. The 1979–1980 season was an improvement; the team put up 24 wins to 12 losses. 1980-1981 saw UWA improve further; they tallied a 25–4 overall record. The Tigers won 12 of their final 13 games, including an 11-game-winning streak. In 1981–1982, the program set a school record collecting 30 wins to only seven defeats; this 30-win season ranks first in the history books. Of the team's seven losses, five came by 10 points or less. The season also saw UWA claim the GSC Championship.

The 1985-1986 campaign opened with six straight wins en route to an 18–9 record for UWA, and in 1986-1987 the women totaled 19 victories. The team brushed the .500 mark a few seasons later. Over the course of the next three seasons, the Tigers won 51 times and lost only 29. The 20-win plateau was achieved in 1997-1998 for the first time since the school's 30-win year.

Amanda Marks came on board in 2001–2002, and UWA's first berth in the NCAA Tournament came that year. With a 22–6 overall record and 14–2 mark in the GSC, the Tigers claimed the East Division championship, headed to the tournament, and won there for the first time since 1987. Although they lost their next tournament game to Delta State, they went to the NCAA Regional. A last-second shot rimmed out at the buzzer, ending the team's run.

The team finished below .500 the next season but rebounded in 2003–2004 to notch another 22-win season. Marks earned her 150th career win in a matchup against Alabama-Huntsville. UWA claimed the fifth spot in the season's initial South Region rankings. The Tigers earned another East Division championship with a 12–2 conference record. They travelled to Rollins to take part in the NCAA Tournament, where UWA garnered their first NCAA win narrowly escaping against Christian Brothers in overtime. But the season came to a close at the hands of Rollins when they fell short 63–45.

In the early 2006–07 season the team won went 12-3 through 15 games, but a late-season collapse and early tournament exit ended a 19-9 year. Marks got her 200th career win with a road win at Montevallo. The Tigers could not get past .500 either of the following years. The 2009–10 season was a rebuilding year for the Tigers. After struggling early on, UWA ended the regular season winning six of their final eight. The women finished 5–5 in GSC action and qualified for the conference tournament. After trailing by only seven at halftime, the Tigers lost to Delta State. Their season concluded with an overall record of 9–19. Latashia Greer was named the East Division's Co-Player of the Year, the program's first player to receive the honor.

Craig Roden took over for Amanda Marks for the 2010–11 season. An alum of the university, Roden came back for his second stint as head coach. He previously led the squad in the 1980s. The season began with a home matchup against Barry from the Sunshine State Conference in a region game. UWA came away with an eight-point win to turn away the Buccaneers. The Tigers went on to post three more victories to start the season 4–0. In the third game, UWA upset #1 ranked Arkansas Tech in Livingston. The women almost pulled off another upset but fell by two to #1 ranked Delta State at home. The team dropped their following game to Talladega College before reeling off ten straight wins. With their win over West Florida in January 2011, the Tigers improved to 14–2, the best record after 16 games in program history.

UWA posted a 4–6 record to close out regular season play and claimed the East Division's third seed. They opened the Gulf South Conference tournament against West Division two seed Delta State but dropped a four-point decision. The squad posted an 18–9 overall record and went 6–6 in conference action. Mystee Dale, a transfer from East Central Community College in Mississippi, earned six Player of the Week accolades, the most of any player in the entire conference, was named the GSC Player of the Year, and led the conference in scoring with 21.2 points per game. She connected on almost 87 percent of her free throw attempts, the highest mark in the GSC, and finished in the top ten of seven other statistical categories. Latasha Greer and LaShandra McCoy also put up effective statistics to aid the turnaround from a year ago. Dale was also named to the Daktronics All-South Region team. She was further recognized as UWA's first-ever All-American in the NCAA era. In 2011-12 UWA won the Gulf South Conference tournament. The 2012–13 season was hurt by injuries to key players, but the team still made the championship game of the conference tournament. Brittany Weathers and Nikkia Jordan were both selected as all first team GSC players.

=== Baseball ===
The University of West Alabama baseball team was founded in the 1940s, but the first season results were not printed until the 1964 season. That year, the Tigers finished two games over .500 at 12–10. At this time, records are not known for the 1965–67 seasons. The following six years were all winning seasons, and UWA won 153 games out of 211 for a .725 percentage. They closed out the 1970s with only two losing seasons. After dominating the previous decade, the team ran into speed bumps during the 1980s.

The team went 30–24 in 1990 and 32-13-1 in 1991; in 992, UWA notched 37 wins, which was a school record at the time. They also brought the first GSC Championship trophy to Livingston. The Tigers earned a bid to the South Central Regional, and a close win over rival North Alabama in the regional championship sent UWA to its only Division II College World Series. However, their chances for the school's first baseball national championship ended as they dropped two of three games.

Gary Rundles became head coach in 2001. He led the team to a .500 finish his first year and encountered his only losing season in 2002. In 2003, the Tigers rallied from a seven-run deficit to knock off #20 Alabama in Tuscaloosa for an upset win. The Tigers finished 2003 with a 31–24 record and improved that to 33–22 in 2004.

In 2005, the team earned their second GSC Championship, again versus North Alabama. The Tigers earned the automatic bid to the South Central Regional, but their run abruptly ended the season at 45–19. UWA came close to repeating in 2006 but lost to Southern Arkansas in the final inning. At the South Central Regional, the Tigers knocked out top seed Abilene Christian. The following day, the team was eliminated by Incarnate Word. UWA's record was at 42–22. During the season, the Tigers set a school record dismantling Lincoln Memorial with a program-best 29 runs in one game.

2007 saw UWA claim the East championship at 14–4 in the division and another berth in the GSC Championship. However, it was not enough as West Florida won their game, cutting the season short at 41–16. In 2008, UWA earned the school's highest ranking ever at #2 in the nation.

After an early exit from the GSC Tournament, the team saw its season come to an end in the South Central Regional. However, with a 45–13 mark, they became the first program in the Gulf South Conference to have four consecutive 40-win seasons. UWA's record during that span was 173-70 for a .712 winning percentage. In 2009, the Tigers knocked off #1 Tampa and later reeled off a 12-game winning streak. During that streak, Gary Rundles claimed his 300th win with the program. They went on to clinch the East Division title with a 14–2 conference record. At the NCAA South Regional, the team ousted Barry but ultimately fell short to Southern Arkansas. UWA closed the 2010 season by winning their last four and ending the year 26–17 overall. The Tigers endured a rough 2011 season finishing at 19–22. The team's finish was the first time in nine years that the team did not have a winning season.

=== Softball ===
The first University of West Alabama fast-pitch softball team was christened in 1986, but the Tigers won only one game during their inaugural season. After Wayne Dees left, Liz Kelley took over, leading the team to a 17–25 record in 1987. For her efforts, she claimed Gulf South Conference Coach of the Year honors. Liz Kelley then left to take a similar position at Miami University in Ohio. Janet Koenig (later Janet Montgomery), a 1986 graduate of Wisconsin-Parkside, was selected as the new head coach.

UWA won four consecutive GSC Championship crowns from 1988 through 1991. During this span, the Tigers went 146-62 for a .701 winning percentage, and in 1991, five team members were named to the GSC Spring Sports All-Academic Team. In 1992, the #1 ranked Tigers swept a doubleheader from #12 Valdosta State and played a hard-fought championship game. However, they did not pick up their fifth consecutive GSC championship, falling 1–0 to Jacksonville State. The next four seasons proved tough for the team as they encountered losing records and hovered around the .500 mark. However, in 1995, the team swept through the GSC Tournament field to notch their fifth tournament title.

During the 1997 season, UWA dominated the GSC Tournament to win their sixth crown. The Tigers were selected to play in the South Regional. It was the program's first and only berth in the NCAA Tournament. UWA made the trip to Miami Shores on the campus of Barry. After posting a 1–2 record, their season came to a close with 32 wins to only 18 losses.

During the 1999 season, UWA dropped the first game of a doubleheader to Mississippi University for Women. They rebounded in the second game with a no-hitter to knock off their opponent in a low-scoring affair.

The Tigers encountered tough seasons from 2000 to 2006. Janet Montgomery's final season as head coach came in 2007. She led the team to a 26–33 record and then took over athletic duties as associate athletic director. Assistant head coach Will Atkinson was promoted to take over the program in 2008. In his first season, UWA finished at .500 with a 29–29 mark. In the Tigers' regular season finale, they rallied to beat #2 Alabama-Huntsville at the UWA Softball Complex, and Brittany McGee tossed the program's first perfect game. Seven players earned conference honors for their season efforts.

In Will Atkinson's second year in 2009, the Tigers recorded their best start ever at 25-2 steamrolling several opponents along the way. During the run, they put together two seven-game winning streaks and an 11-game winning streak. When conference play started, the team encountered a few speed bumps when facing University of West Florida and Alabama-Huntsville. Next came the annual GSC Crossover in Decatur. The Tigers posted a 6–1 record against West Division foes; their sole loss was to Arkansas-Monticello.

After a fourth-place finish in the East Division, the team made their first appearance at the GSC Tournament since 1997. In a rain-shortened tournament, the team's season concluded with a loss to Arkansas Tech. UWA tied the school record for wins with a 42–17 record and placed six players on the All-GSC squad. Also, the team's 12 conference wins equaled the school record, and 80 home runs broke a school record; they were third in the GSC and sixth in the entire country. The Tigers posted a 38–23 record for the 2010 season.

In 2011, UWA won the NCAA South Two Regional to advance to the school's first South Super Regional at Alabama-Huntsville. The team beat Rollins, Tampa, and Arkansas-Monticello. The Tigers defeated two top 15 teams in succession to set up their regional title game berth. After claiming game 1 in the best-of-three series, the Tigers ended the season 38–19.

=== Men's and women's tennis ===
The University of West Alabama men's tennis team was founded in 1974. The women followed suit a decade later in 1984. Both programs were dropped in 1997, but after an eight-year hiatus, the Tigers were reinstated in the fall of 2005. The Howard R. Vaughan Tennis Complex was added to the university campus in time for UWA to begin the 2006 season.

Rod Hartzog was chosen as the head coach and went right to work recruiting players. That season the Tigers swept Alabama-Huntsville, and the women dispatched Montevallo in fine fashion at the GSC Jamboree. In 2007, as part of Super Tiger Day festivities, the men and women claimed victories over Transylvania. Spring Break saw the Tigers match up against several nationally ranked opponents, but UWA did not win any of those matches. The women's final match came at Montevallo where they picked up their only conference win. Their season ended at 5–12 overall, 1–4 in the conference. The UWA men concluded their season at the GSC Tournament to close a 7–11 mark and 1–3 in GSC action.

After two short seasons as head coach, Rod Hartzog resigned, and Glen Fanelli took over as head coach. In 2008, after seven matches, the UWA men's team was undefeated, while the women only dropped one match.

The teams' first conference action took them to Alabama-Huntsville. The Tigers came away with close 5-4 margins in both matches. The rest of GSC action proved difficult as division foes Valdosta State and West Florida were both ranked in the nation's top 5. In the initial NCAA South Region rankings, the women's team placed sixth with the women right behind at seventh. Both teams went on to qualify for the GSC Tournament where UWA's women made their first-ever appearance. Unfortunately, they dropped both of their matches, but the Tiger men picked up a win against Harding in the consolation semi-finals. Glen Fanelli's first season came to an end as he led both teams to winning records. On the women's side, they posted a school-record 15 wins. The men followed close behind with 13 victories to their credit.

A conference road trip sent UWA to Pensacola for the 2009 opener where the Tigers dropped matches to nationally ranked West Florida. Both the men and women notched wins in their home openers against Mississippi College. UWA then hit the road again for ten matches. The Tiger men won their first nine before dropping the finale to a tough Columbus State squad, while the women picked up four victories. Both teams returned to Livingston after several days away from campus. In front of their home crowd, the Tigers picked up key wins and turned back Missouri-St. Louis. The regular season concluded with a four-match homestand and two makeup matches in Tennessee. UWA's men and women both swept region opponents Stillman and Tuskegee in 9-0 fashion. For the second consecutive year, the women returned to the GSC Tournament, but the men's team did not earn a bid, and the women's team ended the season just under the .500 mark at 14–15.

The men's squad received a bid to the NCAA South Regional for the first time in school history. Rollins eliminated them, but their 18–7 record set a school record for wins. In the 2010 slate, the women finished at 16–11 overall, as the men went 18-9 and earned their second consecutive NCAA Tournament bid. With a 2–2 conference record, the Tiger women earned their third consecutive berth in the GSC Tournament. Their 16 wins set a school record for wins in a season breaking the mark set in 2008. The UWA men earned the program's first win in NCAA Tournament action with a close win over Alabama-Huntsville in the South Regional. The win also broke a school record for victories in a season as the men recorded their 19th on the year.

In 2011, the Tigers finished with a 14–9 overall mark. The women's squad eclipsed their 16 wins in 2010 by earning a 17–9 record and going 2–2 in conference action. 2012 saw the women's team continue their improvement with a 19–9 overall mark and 3–4 in the conference. The 2012 men finished with a milestone season of 23-4 including a 5–2 mark in the GSC. The team won 17 straight matches during the season and qualified for the South Regional at Lynn University.

== Other sports ==
=== Men's and women's cross country ===
Sterling Martin is the head men's and women's cross country coach. He took over both programs in 2018.

The first University of West Alabama cross country teams made their way to campus in 1997. Early in their inaugural campaign, the teams took part in the Delta State Cross Country Invitational. The men finished third, and the women earned a fourth place nod. The entire men's team and two of the women all posted top 25 finishes at the file-mile event. At this time, results from the 1998–2004 seasons are unavailable.

2005 opened at the Argo Invitational in Pensacola where the Tiger men garnered 101 points overall. The women's team was unable to compete due to injuries. The season concluded at the GSC Championships with an 11th place nod on the men's side and a 16th-place finish for the women at the GSC Championships. In the spring of 2006, Dr. Don Medeiros came on board as the program's first full-time head coach. UWA tallied fourth-place finishes for both teams as the men earned 104 points, and the women followed suit at 105. At the NCAA South Regional in Memphis, the Tigers picked up 14th and 22nd-place finishes.

Three new members came on board in time for 2007. Two were from the state of Georgia, and the other was from Mississippi. UWA's men then won the Southern Mississippi Invitational, and the women's team would rank in third place. At the Mississippi State Invitational, UWA were the runner-ups. Two players received All-GSC honors to lead the men's team to a 13th-place finish at the NCAA South Regional. When 2008 rolled around, the NCAA awarded the program a Coaching Enhancement Grant and was one of only 18 Division II schools nationwide to receive the honor. With that, Erin Heeder was hired as assistant head coach for the women's team.

A host of new faces for both teams kicked off the year at Mississippi College. The men and women completed the event in third and fourth, respectively. Later, at the Auburn Invitational, the men's team placed sixth and the women earned ninth place.

At the GSC Championships in Hoover, the men of UWA were awarded sixth, while the women tallied a program-best 10th place. The season ended with a top-10 finish for the men and 13th place nod on the women's side. In 2009, in their first action at Southern Mississippi, the Tiger men outran their opponents and earned first place, while UWA's women finished third at the event.

A strong showing a few weeks later saw both squads finish in fourth at Mississippi State. They almost knocked off their conference opponent Alabama-Huntsville. In Jacksonville at the Jacksonville State Foothills Invitational, the Tigers improved upon their previous marks by both posting third. At the conference championship run, the women earned their highest finish in program history at fifth place. The men followed close behind as they returned home in seventh place. The 2009 season wrapped up in Tampa as both sets of Tigers took part in the NCAA South Regional.

=== Men's and women's golf ===
In the fall of 2013 UWA began to field men's and women's golf teams. Adam Buie was hired as the school's first ever head coach. Buie came to UWA from the University of North Carolina at Pembroke, where he was on the UNCP staff for both men's and women's golf. He helped guide the Braves to 11 women's team tournament wins and six men's tournament victories. UNC Pembroke produced numerous all-conference, All-Americans and academic All-Americans during his tenure.

=== Men's and women's outdoor track ===
In the spring of 2013 UWA began competition in both men's and women's outdoor track. Dr. Don Medeiros is the head coach for these programs.

=== Men's and women's rodeo ===
The University of West Alabama rodeo teams were established in 1995. Their first event took them to Southern Arkansas. David Rickman, a native of Tennessee, was introduced by the University of West Alabama Trustees to lead the program. The first teams were made up of 22 members including 17 men and five women.

The early stages of the rodeo arena began thanks in large part to boosters donating around $60,000. In April 1998, UWA competed at the Abraham-Baldwin Agricultural College Rodeo in Tifton, Georgia. Both the men's and women's teams racked in first-place finishes at the event. The men picked up 338 points, and the women earned 310 total. A number of Tiger wranglers posted good showings in their respective events.

A few seasons later, the rodeo teams took part in a regional rodeo showdown in Enid, Oklahoma, facing qualifying teams from the Central Plains Region. The UWA women ended the event in fourth place out of 20 teams, and the men placed fourth out of 23 teams. Head coach Jayson Schoenfeld commented that he was satisfied with each team's performances. Both teams went on later that year to compete at the College National Finals Rodeo in Casper, Wyoming. The following campaign, UWA's men raked in back-to-back first place honors with the women following suit.

During the summer of 2005, UWA competed at the College National Finals Rodeo in Casper with a good turnout. Seven players in all took part in the event. The Tigers' regional placings propelled them to the finals with four women and three men making the long road trip.

Every year, the people of Livingston get the unique opportunity to attend a rodeo in Livingston. This is because the Tiger wranglers host the UWA College Rodeo Showdown at the Don C. Hines Rodeo Complex. Teams from all over make their way to Livingston for the annual event. As they had in 2005, the Tigers made the trek back to Casper for the College National Finals Rodeo. The men garnered a 15th-place finish with the women at 32nd. UWA brought a second-place finish in the nation back to Livingston for the bull riding event. The steer wrestling event saw a fourth-place finish. On the women's side, the Tigers posted 12th place in barrel racing.

Chad Phipps was head coach from 2007 to 2013. An avid rodeo player throughout high school, Phipps was offered a scholarship to the University of Tennessee-Martin. In 2001 and 2002, he received special recognition from the team when he received MVP honors. A native of Dalton, Georgia, his career was cut short when a bull stepped on him. Although he can no longer compete in bull riding, that did not keep him away from the sport. After Jayson Schoenfeld left, he took over the Tiger wrangler program at UWA. Since the inception of rodeo on the university campus, the Tiger women have won the Ozark Region championship five times. The men have been runner-up three years. Both teams finished in fifth place for the 2009 season. They take part in ten events a year, five coming in the fall and the other five during the spring semester.

Dr. Don C. Hines died on August 26 after battling cancer. Dr. Hines made significant contributions during his tenure at UWA, most notably bringing rodeo to campus. The rodeo complex on campus is named in his honor.

After the fall semester, the UWA men picked up 1,840 total points and were third place in the Ozark Region. The Tiger women staked 315 points to their claim for a seventh place mark.

With a 9.9 in the final round, UWA freshman Zach Wilson won the national championship in tie down roping at the College National Finals Rodeo at the Casper Events Center. From Billingsley, Ala., Wilson posted an average of 38.1 and scored 185 points.

Justin Caylor currently serves as interim head coach after being assistant coach for two seasons. Caylor, a 2011 UWA graduate, was a member of the rodeo team while at UWA.

== Athletic facilities ==
The University of West Alabama has several facilities on campus, including outdoor stadiums and an indoor arena as well as training and practice facilities. They are as follows:

- Tiger Stadium is the home of the Tiger football team since 1952, but renovations have been completed in recent years. The home side contains concrete bleachers and red chairback seats for fans who purchase reserved tickets or season passes. A new scoreboard was added on the right side a few years back. The Tiger Room, a place for Tiger Club members, is located underneath the bleachers. The stadium saw a major renovation as a synthetic surface was recently installed. The women's soccer program will play their home games at the stadium beginning in fall 2011.
- James P. Homer Fieldhouse is used primarily for athletic training purposes and adjacent to Tiger Stadium. A weight room as well as coaches' offices are located inside.
- Pruitt Hall is the gymnasium for volleyball as well as the men's and women's basketball teams. Coaches' offices can be found inside the building. Major renovations including the locker rooms, bleachers, and floor have been completed in the last few years. A new scorer's table was recently added as well. Logos of the other GSC schools are placed on the walls behind the bleachers all around the gym. The Summer of 2013 a new floor was put in along with new bleachers with chair-back seats on the team bench sides.
- Tartt Field is the home of the Tiger baseball team. Both sides of the field contain bleachers for spectators to sit. More bleachers and the official pressbox can be found directly behind home plate. Wooden decks for grilling and barbecuing are located beyond the outfield walls. The home dugout and locker room also contains an upstairs area with a complete kitchen, bathrooms, game room, and living room. Concessions are found directly beneath the pressbox. The home side also contains the Dora Dahlberg Beard Indoor Practice Facility.
- The UWA Softball Complex is the home of the Tiger softball team. A locker room has been recently built adjacent to the home dugout. Batting cages can be found on both sides of the field. Bleachers for spectators are located on either side. Like Tartt Field, the official pressbox and more bleachers are located behind home plate. Flags representing the other GSC schools fly behind the center field wall.
- The Dora Dahlberg Beard Indoor Practice Facility is used by the baseball and softball teams. It contains pitching mounds, batting cages, and weight stations. It was recently completed a few years back. The building can be located adjacent to Tartt Field on the home side.
- The Howard R. Vaughan Tennis Complex was completed in 2006 in time for the restoration of the men's and women's tennis programs. It contains six lighted tennis courts, each with its own scoring system to keep track of matches. Bleachers for spectators can be found on the opposite side of the courts.
- The Don C. Hines Rodeo Complex is used by the men's and women's rodeo teams. It contains an indoor arena with bleachers for spectators to watch events. The building is the home of the annual UWA Rodeo Showdown held in the fall semester of each year.
- The UWA Cross Country Facility can be found close to Lake LU on campus. It contains locker rooms for the men's and women's cross country teams. There are also areas reserved for running and practicing.
