= Will Hall (American football) =

American football player and coach (born 1980)

Current position
- Title: Head coach
- Team: Tulane
- Conference: The American
- Record: 6–5

Biographical details
- Born: May 10, 1980 (age 46); Amory, Mississippi, U.S.

Playing career
- 1999–2000: Northwest Mississippi
- 2001: Murray State
- 2002–2003: North Alabama
- 2004: Tupelo FireAnts
- Position: Quarterback

Coaching career (HC unless noted)
- 2004: Presbyterian (QB)
- 2005: Henderson State (assistant)
- 2006: Southwest Baptist (OC)
- 2007: Arkansas–Monticello (OC)
- 2008–2010: West Alabama (OC)
- 2011–2013: West Alabama
- 2014–2016: West Georgia
- 2017: Louisiana (OC)
- 2018: Memphis (AHC/TE)
- 2019–2020: Tulane (OC)
- 2021–2024: Southern Miss
- 2025: Tulane (PGC)
- 2026–present: Tulane

Head coaching record
- Overall: 76–55
- Bowls: 1–0
- Tournaments: 6–4 (NCAA D-II playoffs)

Accomplishments and honors

Championships
- 3 Gulf South (2012, 2013, 2015)

Awards
- Harlon Hill Trophy (2003); 2× Gulf South Coach of The Year (2011–12)

Will Hall (born May 10, 1980) is an American college football coach who is currently the head coach at Tulane University, a position he has held since 2026, after serving as the pass game coordinator at Tulane in 2025. He previously served as the head coach for the University of Southern Mississippi from 2021 to 2024. Hall served as the head football coach at the University of West Alabama from 2011 to 2013 and at the University of West Georgia 2014 to 2016. He also served as offensive coordinator for the University of Louisiana at Lafayette in 2017. He grew up in Mississippi and attended the University of North Alabama where he played quarterback from 2002 to 2003. He won the Harlon Hill Trophy in 2003. He began his coaching career in 2004 and held assistant coaching positions at Presbyterian, Henderson State, Southwest Baptist, Arkansas-Monticello and West Alabama. On November 7, 2026, Hall etched his name into Tulane history by leading the Green Wave to their largest ever defeat in American Conference play (60-10 to Tulsa).

Hall was promoted as West Alabama's head football coach on November 17, 2010, after the first retirement of Bobby Wallace. He served as head coach of the Tigers from 2011 to 2013 and compiled a record of 25–11 and won a pair of Gulf South Conference (GSC) championships. In November 2013, Hall resigned his position at West Alabama and became the head coach at West Georgia. He served as head coach of the Wolves from 2014 to 2016 and compiled a record of 31–9, and in 2015 he won a share of the GSC championship. On January 18, 2017, he accepted the offensive coordinator position for the Louisiana Ragin' Cajuns.

== Early years ==
A native of Amory, Mississippi, Hall graduated from Amory High School. Playing for his father Bobby Hall, Will led the 1998 Amory Panthers squad to the MHSAA Class 3A State Championship. After high school, he attended Northwest Mississippi Community College where he played quarterback for the Rangers for the 1999 and 2000 seasons. Both seasons at Northwest, Hall was named a NJCAA Football All-American. In 2000, he set a NJCAA record for total offense in a season with 4,075 total yards (93 rushing and 3,982 passing). Hall also set a NJCAA record when he threw nine touchdown passes in a 69–37 victory over East Mississippi Community College in the 2000 season.

After Northwest Mississippi, Hall attended the University of North Alabama where he lettered as quarterback for the Lions for the 2002 and 2003 seasons. Following the 2003 season he won the Harlon Hill Trophy as the top player in NCAA Division II football. He won the award after leading the Lions to a 13–1 record en route to the semifinals of the NCAA Division II playoffs. For the season, Hall completed 71.8 percent of his passes in throwing for 3,531 yards and 30 touchdowns. He also rushed for 467 yards and five touchdowns.

After participating in the 2004 Cactus Bowl, Hall signed a contract to play for the Tupelo FireAnts of the National Indoor Football League for the 2004 season. Playing once again for his father, who was the head coach for the team, during the fourteen-game season he passed for 2,046 yards and 44 touchdowns. Hall also rushed for 422 yards and thirteen touchdowns.

== Coaching career ==
=== Assistant coaching career ===
Hall started his coaching career as the quarterbacks coach at Presbyterian College in 2004. From Presbyterian he went to Henderson State University for spring 2005, Southwest Baptist University for fall 2005 and 2006 and the University of Arkansas at Monticello for 2007. In December 2007 Hall was hired to serve as offensive coordinator at the University of West Alabama Under his leadership, the Tigers' offense saw significant improvement, and by 2010 led the Gulf South Conference in pass efficiency with a 155.8 rating. During his tenure West Alabama had consecutive winning seasons for the first time since 1991–92 and to the NCAA second round of the 2009 Division II playoffs.

=== Head coaching career ===
On November 17, 2010, Hall was promoted from his position of offensive coordinator to head coach effective January 1, 2011, to replace the retiring Bobby Wallace. In his first season as head coach, Hall led the Tigers to an 8–3 regular season, but lost in the first round of the 2011 Division II playoffs to his alma mater North Alabama. For his efforts, Hall was named the 2011 Gulf South Conference Co-Coach of the Year and was given a contract extension through the 2014 season. In 2012, Hall led the Tigers to an overall record of nine wins and two losses, to the second round of the NCAA Division II playoffs and to the first outright Gulf South championship in the history of the program. In 2013, he led his team to back to back Gulf South conference champion. In 2013, Hall led the Tigers to a share of the GSC conference championship with North Alabama.

On November 22, 2013, Hall was officially introduced as the new head coach for the West Georgia Wolves. In his first season with the Wolves, Hall led West Georgia to the Division II championship semifinals where they lost to eventual national champions CSU–Pueblo and finished the season with a record of 12–3. He went on in 2015 to with share of GSC title (with North Alabama) and lose to the eventual national champion Northwest Missouri State. After he compiled an overall record of 31 wins and nine losses with the Wolves, Hall resigned his position with West Georgia and took the position of offensive coordinator at Louisiana. At Louisiana he was reunited with Mark Hudspeth who was his head coach when he played quarterback at North Alabama.

=== University of Southern Mississippi ===
On December 2, 2020, Hall was officially named the head coach of the Southern Miss Golden Eagles.

On October 20, 2024, Hall was fired after a 1–6 start to the season and a 14–30 overall record.

=== Tulane (second stint) ===
On January 2, 2025, Hall was named the pass game coordinator at Tulane University.

== Head coaching record ==
Year	Team	Overall	Conference	Standing	Bowl/playoffs
West Alabama Tigers (Gulf South Conference) (2011–2013)
2011	West Alabama	8–4	2–2	T–2nd	L NCAA Division II First Round
2012	West Alabama	9–4	4–0	1st	L NCAA Division II Second Round
2013	West Alabama	8–3	5–1	T–1st	
West Alabama:		25–11	11–3		
West Georgia Wolves (Gulf South Conference) (2014–2016)
2014	West Georgia	12–3	5–2	3rd	L NCAA Division II Semifinal
2015	West Georgia	12–2	6–1	T–1st	L NCAA Division II Semifinal
2016	West Georgia	7–4	4–4	5th	
West Georgia:		31–9	15–7		
Southern Miss Golden Eagles (Conference USA) (2021)
2021	Southern Miss	3–9	2–6	T–6th (West)	
Southern Miss Golden Eagles (Sun Belt Conference) (2022–2024)
2022	Southern Miss	7–6	4–4	T–3rd (West)	W LendingTree
2023	Southern Miss	3–9	2–6	6th (West)	
2024	Southern Miss	1–6	0–3	(Note: Hall was fired seven games into the season.)	
Southern Miss:		14–30	8–19		
Tulane Green Wave (American Conference) (2026–present)
2026	Tulane	6–5	4–3		
Tulane:		6–5	4–3		
Total:		76–55			
National championship Conference title Conference division title or championship game berth
