= 2016 Valdosta State Blazers football team =

American college football season

2016 Valdosta State Blazers football

NCAA Division II First Round, L 21–24 vs. UNC Pembroke
- Conference: Gulf South Conference

Ranking
- AFCA: No. 18
- Record: 8–3 (6–2 GSC)
- Head coach: Kerwin Bell (1st season)
- Defensive coordinator: James Rowe (1st season)
- Home stadium: Bazemore–Hyder Stadium

2016 Gulf South Conference football standings
	Conf.			Overall
Team	W		L	W		L
No. 2 North Alabama $^	7	–	0	11	–	2
No. 18 Valdosta State ^	6	–	2	8	–	3
West Alabama	6	–	2	7	–	4
Florida Tech ^	5	–	2	8	–	3
West Georgia	4	–	4	7	–	4
West Florida	3	–	5	5	–	6
Delta State †	3	–	5	4	–	6
Mississippi College	1	–	7	3	–	7
Shorter	0	–	8	0	–	11
$ – Conference champion; ^ – NCAA Division II playoff participant; † – Delta State's record is officially listed as 2–8 (1–7) due to the use of ineligible players in two wins, but the opponents are not credited with wins.; Rankings from AFCA Poll

The 2016 Valdosta State Blazers football team represented Valdosta State University as a member of the Gulf South Conference (GSC) during the 2016 NCAA Division II football season. They were led by first-year head coach Kerwin Bell and played their home games at Bazemore–Hyder Stadium in Valdosta, Georgia. Valdosta State compiled an overall record of 8–3 with a mark of 6–2 in conference play, placing second in the GSC. They were invited to the NCAA Division II Football Championship playoffs, where they lost in the first round to UNC Pembroke.

== Schedule ==
Valdosta State announced its 2016 football schedule on March 17, 2016. The schedule consisted of five home games, four away game, and one neutral site games in the regular season. The Blazers hosted GSC foes Delta State, Shorter, West Florida, and West Georgia, and traveled to Florida Tech, Mississippi College, North Alabama, and West Alabama.

The Blazers hosted one non-conference game against Albany State of the Southern Intercollegiate Athletic Conference (SIAC) and traveled to one neutral site game against Kentucky State, also from the SIAC.

Date	Time	Opponent	Rank	Site	TV	Result	Attendance
September 3	7:00 p.m	Albany State*		Bazemore–Hyder Stadium; Valdosta, GA		W 16–7	5,401
September 17	7:00 p.m.	at No. 20 North Alabama	No. 22	Braly Municipal Stadium; Florence, AL		L 19–44	8,216
September 24	7:00 p.m.	West Florida		Bazemore–Hyder Stadium; Valdosta, GA		W 40–28	6,810
October 1	2:00 p.m.	vs. Kentucky State*		Memorial Stadium; Waycross, GA		W 48–10	
October 8	7:00 p.m.	No. 12 West Georgia	No. 25	Bazemore–Hyder Stadium; Valdosta, GA (rivalry)		W 38–27	4,105
October 15	4:00 p.m.	at Mississippi College	No. 17	Robinson-Hale Stadium; Clinton, MS		W 42–41	5,979
October 22	3:00 p.m.	Delta State^{†}	No. 16	Bazemore–Hyder Stadium; Valdosta, GA		W 56–27	5,402
October 29	7:00 p.m.	at Florida Tech	No. 14	Florida Tech Panther Stadium; Melbourne, FL	ESPN3	L 20–38	3,247
November 5	3:00 p.m.	at West Alabama	No. 23	Tiger Stadium; Livingston, AL	ESPN3	W 37–22	5,269
November 12	7:00 p.m.	Shorter	No. 23	Bazemore–Hyder Stadium; Valdosta, GA		W 44–0	3,654
November 19	1:00 p.m.	No. 12 UNC Pembroke*	No. 19	Bazemore–Hyder Stadium; Valdosta, GA (NCAA Division II First Round)		L 21–24	20,184
*Non-conference game; ^{†}Homecoming; Rankings from American Football Coaches Association Poll released prior to the game; All times are in Eastern time
