= 2016 Delta State Statesmen football team =

American college football season

2016 Delta State Statesmen football
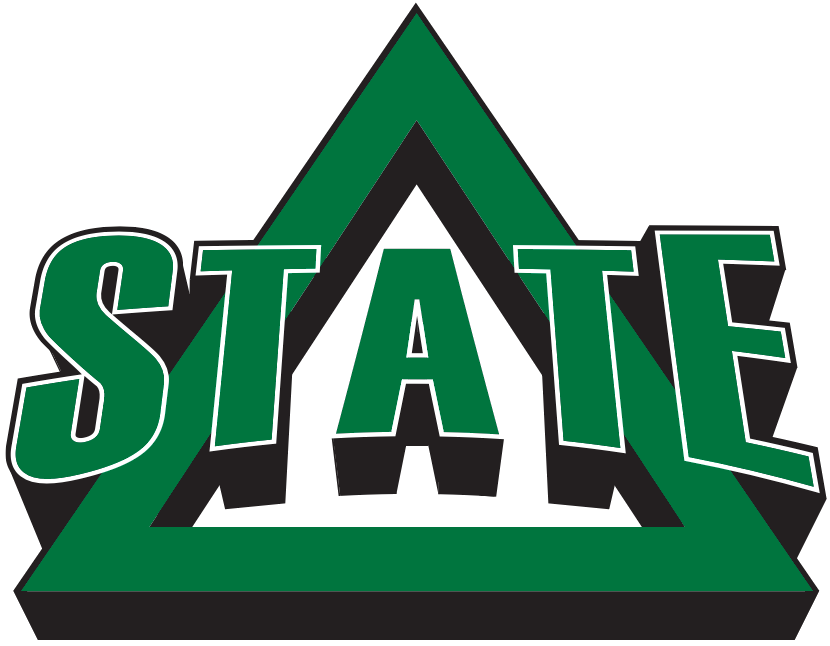
- Conference: Gulf South Conference
- Record: 4–6 (3–5 GSC)
- Head coach: Todd Cooley (4th season)
- Offensive coordinator: Joel Williams (4th season)
- Defensive coordinator: Raleigh Jackson (1st season)
- Home stadium: Parker Field at Horace McCool Stadium

2016 Gulf South Conference football standings
	Conf.			Overall
Team	W		L	W		L
No. 2 North Alabama $^	7	–	0	11	–	2
No. 18 Valdosta State ^	6	–	2	8	–	3
West Alabama	6	–	2	7	–	4
Florida Tech ^	5	–	2	8	–	3
West Georgia	4	–	4	7	–	4
West Florida	3	–	5	5	–	6
Delta State †	3	–	5	4	–	6
Mississippi College	1	–	7	3	–	7
Shorter	0	–	8	0	–	11
$ – Conference champion; ^ – NCAA Division II playoff participant; † – Delta State's record is officially listed as 2–8 (1–7) due to the use of ineligible players in two wins, but the opponents are not credited with wins.; Rankings from AFCA poll

The 2016 Delta State Statesmen football team represented the Delta State University in the 2016 NCAA Division II football season. They were led by head coach Todd Cooley, who was in his fourth season at Delta State. The Statesmen played their home games at McCool Stadium and were members of the Gulf South Conference. They finished the season with a record of 4 wins and 6 losses (4–6 overall, 3–5 in the GSC) and were not invited in the 2016 playoffs.

== Schedule ==
Delta State announced its 2016 football schedule which consists of six home and four away games in the regular season. The Statesmen will host GSC foes Mississippi College, North Alabama, Shorter, and West Florida, and will travel to Florida Tech, Valdosta State, West Alabama and West Georgia.

The Statesmen will host both non-conference games against Kentucky Wesleyan of the Great Midwest Athletic Conference and Texas A&M–Commerce of the Lone Star Conference.

Date	Time	Opponent	Site	TV	Result	Attendance
September 3	6:00 p.m	Kentucky Wesleyan*	McCool Stadium; Cleveland, MS		W 50–29	6,781
September 10	6:00 p.m.	No. 8 Texas A&M–Commerce*	McCool Stadium; Cleveland, MS		L 28–40	5,679
September 17	1:00 p.m.	at No. 3 West Georgia	University Stadium; Carrollton, GA		L 24–34	6,837
September 24	6:00 p.m.	Shorter	McCool Stadium; Cleveland, MS		W 47–7	7,151
September 29	6:00 p.m.	Mississippi College	McCool Stadium; Cleveland, MS (Rivalry)	ESPN3	W 61–31	6,332
October 8	2:00 p.m.	at West Alabama	Tiger Stadium; Livingston, AL		L 42–54	6,921
October 15	4:00 p.m.	West Florida^{†}	McCool Stadium; Cleveland, MS		W 55–51	7,002
October 22	2:00 p.m.	at No. 16 Valdosta State	Bazemore–Hyder Stadium; Valdosta, GA		L 27–56	5,402
October 29	2:00 p.m.	No. 7 North Alabama	McCool Stadium; Cleveland, MS		L 19–49	2,863
November 12	1:00 p.m.	at Florida Tech	Florida Tech Panther Stadium; Melbourne, FL	ESPN3	L 16–42	4,026
*Non-conference game; ^{†}Homecoming; Rankings from Coaches' Poll released prior to the game; All times are in Central time
