= 2016 West Georgia Wolves football team =

American college football season

2016 West Georgia Wolves football
- Conference: Gulf South Conference
- Record: 7–4 (4–4 GSC)
- Head coach: Will Hall (3rd season)
- Offensive coordinator: Sam Gregg (3rd season)
- Defensive coordinator: Scott Symons (3rd season)
- Home stadium: University Stadium

2016 Gulf South Conference football standings
	Conf.			Overall
Team	W		L	W		L
No. 2 North Alabama $^	7	–	0	11	–	2
No. 18 Valdosta State ^	6	–	2	8	–	3
West Alabama	6	–	2	7	–	4
Florida Tech ^	5	–	2	8	–	3
West Georgia	4	–	4	7	–	4
West Florida	3	–	5	5	–	6
Delta State †	3	–	5	4	–	6
Mississippi College	1	–	7	3	–	7
Shorter	0	–	8	0	–	11
$ – Conference champion; ^ – NCAA Division II playoff participant; † – Delta State's record is officially listed as 2–8 (1–7) due to the use of ineligible players in two wins, but the opponents are not credited with wins.; Rankings from AFCA Poll

The 2016 West Georgia Wolves football team represented the University of West Georgia in the 2016 NCAA Division II football season. They were led by head coach Will Hall, who was in his third season at West Georgia. The Wolves played their home games at University Stadium and were members of the Gulf South Conference. They finished the season with a record of 7 wins and 4 losses (7–4 overall, 4–4 in the GSC), defeating one top 25 ranked team, ranked as high as #2 in the nation before falling in the middle of the season. West Georgia were not invited in the 2016 playoffs.

== Schedule ==
West Georgia announced its 2016 football schedule on January 6, 2016. The schedule consists of 5 home and 6 away games in the regular season. The Wolves will host GSC foes Delta State, Florida Tech, Mississippi College, and West Alabama, and will travel to North Alabama, Shorter, Valdosta State, and West Florida.

The Wolves will host only one non-conference game against Catawba of the South Atlantic Conference and travel to two away games against Albany State and Miles both from the Southern Intercollegiate Athletic Conference.

Date	Time	Opponent	Rank	Site	TV	Result	Attendance
September 3	2:00 p.m	No. 22 Catawba*	No. 2	University Stadium; Carrollton, GA		W 23–3	7,617
September 10	5:00 p.m.	at Miles*	No. 2	Alumni Stadium; Fairfield, AL		W 29–0	2,437
September 17	2:00 p.m.	Delta State	No. 3	University Stadium; Carrollton, GA		W 34–24	6,837
September 24	7:00 p.m.	at Albany State*	No. 3	Albany State University Coliseum; Albany, GA		W 27–23	6,474
October 1	7:00 p.m.	at No. 18 North Alabama	No. 3	Braly Municipal Stadium; Florence, AL	ESPN3	L 23–24	7,726
October 8	7:00 p.m.	at No. 25 Valdosta State	No. 12	Bazemore–Hyder Stadium; Valdosta, GA (Rivalry)		L 27–38	4,105
October 15	2:00 p.m.	West Alabama	No. 24	University Stadium; Carrollton, GA	ESPN3	L 7–31	5,633
October 22	2:00 p.m.	Mississippi College^{†}		University Stadium; Carrollton, GA		W 31–23	6,326
October 29	1:30 p.m.	at Shorter		Barron Stadium; Rome, GA		W 44–0	1,000
November 5	2:00 p.m.	Florida Tech		University Stadium; Carrollton, GA		L 21–45	5,132
November 12	1:00 p.m.	at West Florida		Blue Wahoos Stadium; Pensacola, FL		W 69–0	6,088
*Non-conference game; ^{†}Homecoming; Rankings from Coaches' Poll released prior to the game; All times are in Eastern time
