= 2016 West Alabama Tigers football team =

American college football season

2016 West Alabama Tigers football
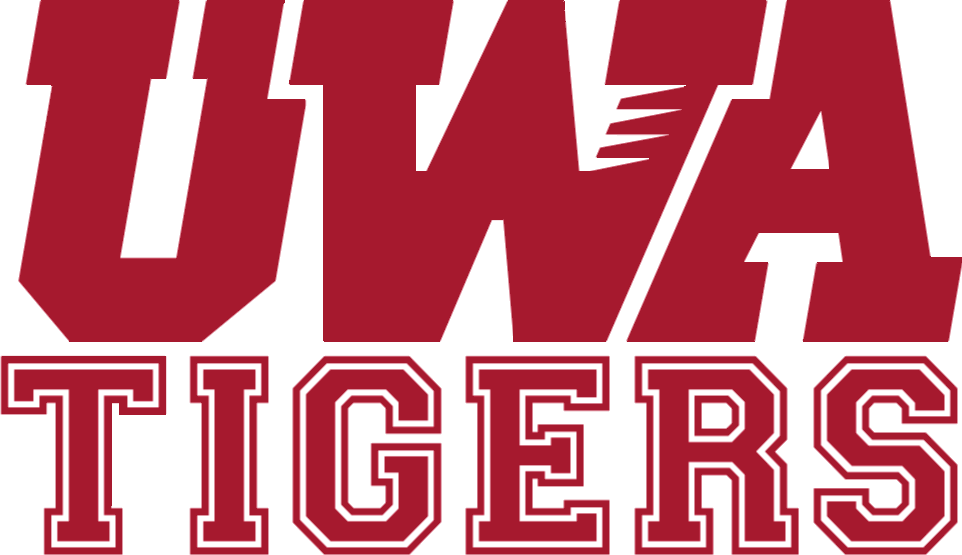
- Conference: Gulf South Conference
- Record: 7–4 (6–2 GSC)
- Head coach: Brett Gilliland (3rd season)
- Offensive coordinator: Don Bailey (1st season)
- Defensive coordinator: Nathan Burton (3rd season)
- Home stadium: Tiger Stadium

2016 Gulf South Conference football standings
	Conf.			Overall
Team	W		L	W		L
No. 2 North Alabama $^	7	–	0	11	–	2
No. 18 Valdosta State ^	6	–	2	8	–	3
West Alabama	6	–	2	7	–	4
Florida Tech ^	5	–	2	8	–	3
West Georgia	4	–	4	7	–	4
West Florida	3	–	5	5	–	6
Delta State †	3	–	5	4	–	6
Mississippi College	1	–	7	3	–	7
Shorter	0	–	8	0	–	11
$ – Conference champion; ^ – NCAA Division II playoff participant; † – Delta State's record is officially listed as 2–8 (1–7) due to the use of ineligible players in two wins, but the opponents are not credited with wins.; Rankings from AFCA Poll

The 2016 West Alabama Tigers football team represented the University of West Alabama in the 2016 NCAA Division II football season. They were led by head coach Brett Gilliland, who was in his third season at West Alabama. The Tigers played their home games at Tiger Stadium and were members of the Gulf South Conference. They finished the season with a record of 7 wins and 4 losses (7–4 overall, 6–2 in the GSC), defeating two top-25-ranked teams and were not invited in the 2016 playoffs.

== Schedule ==
West Alabama announced its 2016 football schedule on February 16, 2016. The schedule consists of both five home and six away games in the regular season. The Tigers hosted GSC foes Delta State, Florida Tech, North Alabama, and Valdosta State and traveled to Mississippi College, Shorter, West Florida, and West Georgia

The Tigers only hosted one of the three non-conference games against Malone Pioneers of the Great Midwest Athletic Conference and traveled to two games against North Greenville which is independent from a conference and Stephen F. Austin of the Southland Conference.

Date	Time	Opponent	Site	TV	Result	Attendance
September 1	6:00 p.m.	at North Greenville*	Younts Stadium; Tigerville, SC		L 23–24	3,822
September 10	7:35 p.m.	at Stephen F. Austin*	Homer Bryce Stadium; Nacogdoches, TX	ESPN3	L 24–30	5,812
September 17	6:00 p.m.	at Mississippi College	Robinson-Hale Stadium; Clinton, MS		W 38–13	3,143
September 24	6:00 p.m.	No. 19 North Alabama	Tiger Stadium; Livingston, AL (rivalry)	ESPN3	L 7–45	6,863
September 29	6:00 p.m.	at Shorter	Barron Stadium; Rome, GA		W 43–28	850
October 8	4:00 p.m.	Delta State^{†}	Tiger Stadium; Livingston, AL		W 54–42	6,921
October 15	1:00 p.m.	at No. 24 West Georgia	University Stadium; Carrollton, GA	ESPN3	W 31–7	5,633
October 22	6:00 p.m.	No. 19 Florida Tech	Tiger Stadium; Livingston, AL		W 45–35	3,588
October 29	12:00 p.m.	at West Florida	Blue Wahoos Stadium; Pensacola, FL		W 45–21	6,088
November 5	2:00 p.m.	No. 23 Valdosta State	Tiger Stadium; Livingston, AL	ESPN3	L 22–37	5,269
November 12	2:00 p.m.	Malone*	Tiger Stadium; Livingston, AL		W 56–7	3,702
*Non-conference game; ^{†}Homecoming; Rankings from AFCA Poll released prior to the game; All times are in Central time
