= 2016 Mississippi College Choctaws football team =

American college football season

2016 Mississippi College Choctaws football
- Conference: Gulf South Conference
- Record: 3–7 (1–7 GSC)
- Head coach: John Bland (3rd season)
- Defensive coordinator: Michael Collins (1st season)
- Home stadium: Robinson-Hale Stadium

2016 Gulf South Conference football standings
	Conf.			Overall
Team	W		L	W		L
No. 2 North Alabama $^	7	–	0	11	–	2
No. 18 Valdosta State ^	6	–	2	8	–	3
West Alabama	6	–	2	7	–	4
Florida Tech ^	5	–	2	8	–	3
West Georgia	4	–	4	7	–	4
West Florida	3	–	5	5	–	6
Delta State †	3	–	5	4	–	6
Mississippi College	1	–	7	3	–	7
Shorter	0	–	8	0	–	11
$ – Conference champion; ^ – NCAA Division II playoff participant; † – Delta State's record is officially listed as 2–8 (1–7) due to the use of ineligible players in two wins, but the opponents are not credited with wins.; Rankings from AFCA Poll

The 2016 Mississippi College Choctaws football team represented Mississippi College in the 2016 NCAA Division II football season. They were led by head coach John Bland, who was in his third season at Mississippi College. The Choctaws played their home games at Robinson-Hale Stadium and were members of the Gulf South Conference. They finished the season with a record of 3 wins and 7 losses (3–7 overall, 1–7 in the GSC) and were not invited in the 2016 playoffs.

== Schedule ==
Mississippi College announced its 2016 football schedule on July 18, 2016. The schedule consists of six home and four away games in the regular season. The Choctaws will host GSC foes North Alabama, Valdosta State, West Alabama, and West Florida, and will travel to Delta State, Florida Tech, Shorter, and West Georgia.

The Choctaws will host both non-conference games against Cumberland of the Mid-South Conference and Point of the Sun Conference.

Date	Time	Opponent	Site	TV	Result	Attendance
September 3	2:00 p.m	Point*	Robinson-Hale Stadium; Clinton, MS		W 28–16	4,147
September 10	6:00 p.m.	at No. 22 Florida Tech	Florida Tech Panther Stadium; Melbourne, FL		L 0–41	3,056
September 17	7:00 p.m.	West Alabama	Robinson–Hale Stadium; Clinton, MS		L 13–38	3,143
September 24	7:00 p.m.	Cumberland*	Robinson–Hale Stadium; Clinton, MS		W 27–26	4,381
September 29	6:00 p.m.	at Delta State	McCool Stadium; Cleveland, MS (Rivalry)	ESPN3	L 31–61	6,332
October 8	2:00 p.m.	West Florida	Robinson–Hale Stadium; Clinton, MS	ESPN3	L 28–42	2,468
October 15	3:00 p.m.	No. 17 Valdosta State^{†}	Robinson–Hale Stadium; Clinton, MS		L 41–42	5,979
October 22	1:00 p.m.	at West Georgia	University Stadium; Carrollton, GA		L 23–31	6,326
November 5	12:30 p.m.	at Shorter	Barron Stadium; Rome, GA		W 32–0	750
November 12	2:00 p.m.	No. 7 North Alabama	Robinson–Hale Stadium; Clinton, MS		L 7–42	6,232
*Non-conference game; ^{†}Homecoming; Rankings from Coaches' Poll released prior to the game; All times are in Central time
