= 2016 North Alabama Lions football team =

American college football season

2016 North Alabama Lions football

NCAA Division II Championship finalist GSC champion

NCAA Division II Championship Game, L 3–29 vs. Northwest Missouri State
- Conference: Gulf South Conference
- Record: 11–2 (7–0 GSC)
- Head coach: Bobby Wallace (15th season)
- Offensive coordinator: Steadman Campbell (1st season)
- Defensive coordinator: Chris Willis (5th season)
- Home stadium: Braly Municipal Stadium

2016 Gulf South Conference football standings
	Conf.			Overall
Team	W		L	W		L
No. 2 North Alabama $^	7	–	0	11	–	2
No. 18 Valdosta State ^	6	–	2	8	–	3
West Alabama	6	–	2	7	–	4
Florida Tech ^	5	–	2	8	–	3
West Georgia	4	–	4	7	–	4
West Florida	3	–	5	5	–	6
Delta State †	3	–	5	4	–	6
Mississippi College	1	–	7	3	–	7
Shorter	0	–	8	0	–	11
$ – Conference champion; ^ – NCAA Division II playoff participant; † – Delta State's record is officially listed as 2–8 (1–7) due to the use of ineligible players in two wins, but the opponents are not credited with wins.; Rankings from AFCA poll

The 2016 North Alabama Lions football team represented the University of North Alabama as a member of the Gulf South Conference (GSC) during the 2016 NCAA Division II football season. Led by Bobby Wallace in 15th and final season as head coach, the Lions compiled an overall record of 11–2 with a mark of 7–0 in conference play, winning the GCS title. North Alabama advanced to the NCAA Division II football championship playoffs, where, after the first-round bye, the Lions defeated UNC Pembroke in the second round, North Greenville in the quarterfinals, and Shepherd in the semifinals before losing to Northwest Missouri State in the NCAA Division II Championship Game. The team played home games at Braly Municipal Stadium in Florence, Alabama.

== Schedule ==
North Alabama announced its 2016 football schedule on February 9, 2016. The schedule consists of five home games and five away games in the regular season.

Date	Time	Opponent	Rank	Site	TV	Result	Attendance	Source
September 1	6:00 p.m	at No. 3 (FCS) Jacksonville State*	No. 15	JSU Stadium; Jacksonville, AL	WEAC TV-24	L 12–31	22,116	
September 17	6:00 p.m.	No. 22 Valdosta State	No. 20	Braly Municipal Stadium; Florence, AL		W 44–19	8,216	
September 24	6:00 p.m.	at West Alabama	No. 19	Tiger Stadium; Livingston, AL (rivalry)	ESPN3	W 45–7	6,863	
October 1	6:00 p.m.	No. 3 West Georgia	No. 18	Braly Municipal Stadium; Florence, AL	ESPN3	W 24–23	7,726	
October 8	7:00 p.m.	No. 23 Florida Tech	No. 11	Florida Tech Panther Stadium; Melbourne, FL		Canceled^{[a]}		
October 15	7:00 p.m.	Shorter	No. 10	Braly Municipal Stadium; Florence, AL		W 45–0	9,958	
October 22	6:00 p.m.	North Greenville*	No. 10	Braly Municipal Stadium; Florence, AL		W 52–21	7,933	
October 29	2:00 p.m.	Delta State	No. 7	McCool Stadium; Cleveland, MS		W 49–19	2,863	
November 5	1:30 p.m.	West Florida	No. 7	Braly Municipal Stadium; Florence, AL		W 51–3	10,489	
November 12	2:00 p.m.	Mississippi College	No. 7	Robinson-Hale Stadium; Clinton, MS		W 42–7	6,232	
November 26	12:00 p.m.	No. 12 UNC Pembroke*	No. 7	Braly Municipal Stadium; Florence, AL (NCAA Division II Second Round)		W 41–17	4,258	
December 3	12:00 p.m.	North Greenville*	No. 7	Braly Municipal Stadium; Florence, AL (NCAA Division II Quarterfinal)		W 38–0	5,113	
December 10	12:00 p.m.	No. 3 Shepherd*	No. 7	Ram Stadium; Shepherdstown, WV (NCAA Division II Semifinal)	ESPN3	W 23–13	7,017	
December 17	3:00 p.m.	No. 1 Northwest Missouri State*	No. 7	Children's Mercy Park; Kansas City, KS (NCAA Division II Championship Game)	ESPN2	L 3–29	9,576	
*Non-conference game; Rankings from AFCA Poll released prior to the game; All times are in Central time

^{^[a]}The game between Florida Tech and North Alabama was cancelled in advance of the arrival of Hurricane Matthew.
