= 2016 Florida Tech Panthers football team =

American college football season

2016 Florida Tech Panthers football
- Conference: Gulf South Conference
- Record: 8–3 (5–2 GSC)
- Head coach: Steve Englehart (4th season)
- Offensive coordinator: Jayson Martin (4th season)
- Defensive coordinator: Mark Smith (1st season)
- Home stadium: Florida Tech Panther Stadium

2016 Gulf South Conference football standings
	Conf.			Overall
Team	W		L	W		L
No. 2 North Alabama $^	7	–	0	11	–	2
No. 18 Valdosta State ^	6	–	2	8	–	3
West Alabama	6	–	2	7	–	4
Florida Tech ^	5	–	2	8	–	3
West Georgia	4	–	4	7	–	4
West Florida	3	–	5	5	–	6
Delta State †	3	–	5	4	–	6
Mississippi College	1	–	7	3	–	7
Shorter	0	–	8	0	–	11
$ – Conference champion; ^ – NCAA Division II playoff participant; † – Delta State's record is officially listed as 2–8 (1–7) due to the use of ineligible players in two wins, but the opponents are not credited with wins.; Rankings from AFCA Poll

The 2016 Florida Tech Panthers football team represented the Florida Institute of Technology (FIT) during the 2016 NCAA Division II football season. They were led by head coach Steve Englehart, who was in his fourth season at Florida Tech. The Panthers play their home games at Florida Tech Panther Stadium, approximately one mile from the Florida Tech campus and are members of the Gulf South Conference.

== Schedule ==
Florida Tech announced its 2016 football schedule on February 17, 2016. The schedule consists of 5 home and 6 away games in the regular season. The Panthers will host GSC foes Delta State, Mississippi College, North Alabama, and Valdosta State, and will travel to Shorter, West Alabama, West Florida, and West Georgia.

The Panthers hosted only one non-conference game against Fort Valley State of the Southern Intercollegiate Athletic Conference and travel to two against Newberry of the South Atlantic Conference and Presbyterian of the Big South Conference.

Date	Time	Opponent	Rank	Site	TV	Result	Attendance
September 3	6:00 p.m	at Newberry*		Setzler Field; Newberry, SC		W 42–28	3,378
September 10	7:00 p.m.	Mississippi College	No. 22	Florida Tech Panther Stadium; Melbourne, FL		W 41–0	3,056
September 17	7:00 p.m.	at Shorter	No. 19	Barron Stadium; Rome, GA	ESPN3	W 40–0	1,150
September 24	7:00 p.m.	at Presbyterian*	No. 19	Bailey Memorial Stadium; Clinton, SC	BSN	W 28–7	3,290
October 1	7:00 p.m.	at West Florida	No. 16	Blue Wahoos Stadium; Pensacola, FL (Coastal Classic)	ASN	L 39–42	6,588
October 8	7:00 p.m.	No. 11 North Alabama	No. 23	Florida Tech Panther Stadium; Melbourne, FL		Canceled^{[a]}	
October 15	1:00 p.m.	Fort Valley State^{†}	No. 20	Florida Tech Panther Stadium; Melbourne, FL		W 48-14	3,034
October 22	3:00 p.m.	West Alabama	No. 19	Tiger Stadium; Livingston, AL		L 35-45	3,034
October 29	7:00 p.m.	No. 14 Valdosta State		Florida Tech Panther Stadium; Melbourne, FL	ESPN3	W 38-20	3,247
November 5	2:00 p.m.	West Georgia		University Stadium; Carrollton, GA		W 45-21	5,132
November 12	2:00 p.m.	Delta State		Florida Tech Panther Stadium; Melbourne, FL	ESPN3	W 42-16	4,026
November 19	12:00 p.m.	North Greenville	No. 23	Florida Tech Panther Stadium; Melbourne, FL (Division II Playoffs First Round)		L 13-27	1,480
*Non-conference game; ^{†}Homecoming; Rankings from Coaches' Poll released prior to the game

^{^[a]}The game between Florida Tech and North Alabama was cancelled in advance of the arrival of Hurricane Matthew.

== Game summaries ==
=== At Newberry ===
	1	2	3	4	Total
Panthers	7	14	13	8	42
Wolves	0	21	7	0	28

=== Mississippi College ===
	1	2	3	4	Total
Choctaws	0	0	0	0	0
Panthers	7	21	6	7	41

=== At Shorter ===
	1	2	3	4	Total
Panthers	10	17	10	3	40
Hawks	0	0	0	0	0

=== At Presbyterian ===
	1	2	3	4	Total
Panthers	7	7	7	7	28
Blue Hose	0	0	7	0	7

=== At West Florida ===
	1	2	3	4	Total
Panthers	7	0	10	22	39
Argonauts	7	14	7	14	42

=== Fort Valley State ===
	1	2	3	4	Total
Wildcats	0	7	0	7	14
Panthers	13	28	7	0	48

=== At West Alabama ===
	1	2	3	4	Total
Panthers	14	0	14	7	35
Tigers	7	14	14	10	45

=== Valdosta State ===
	1	2	3	4	Total
Blazers	0	7	3	10	20
Panthers	10	7	0	21	38

=== At West Georgia ===
	1	2	3	4	Total
Panthers	7	14	10	14	45
Wolves	7	7	7	0	21

=== Delta State ===
	1	2	3	4	Total
Statesmen	2	7	0	7	16
Panthers	14	14	7	7	42

=== North Greenville ===
	1	2	3	4	Total
Crusaders	3	0	14	10	27
Panthers	0	3	3	7	13

== Awards and milestones ==
=== Gulf South Conference honors ===
Ten players from Florida Tech were honored as All-GSC selections by the league's coaches, including a program-record six First Team members.

==== Gulf South Conference All-Conference First Team ====
- Antwaun Haynes, RB/AP
- Kenny Johnston, TE
- Cory Sanicky, G
- Adonis Davis, DL
- Chris Stapleton, LB
- Manny Abad, DB

==== Gulf South Conference All-Conference Second Team ====
- Trevor Sand, RB
- Wayne Saunders II, WR
- Joe Laguna, T
- Kevin Delgado, G

==== Gulf South Conference offensive player of the week ====
- November 14: Antwuan Haynes

==== Gulf South Conference defensive player of the week ====
- September 12: Adonis Davis
- September 26: Jo Jackson
- October 31: Tyler Rosenblatt
- November 7: Chris Stapleton

=== School records ===
- Most rushing touchdowns in a season: 10, Antwuan Haynes and Trevor Sand
- Most passing yards in a single game: 502, Mark Cato (October 22)
- Most receiving yards in a single game: 185, Kenny Johnston (October 1)
- Most interceptions in a single game: 2, Tyler Rosenblatt (October 29) and Jo Jackson (September 24th)
- Most yards of total offense gained in a single game: 643 (October 22)
- Fewest yards of total offense surrendered in a single game: 73 (September 17)
