= Bobby Wallace (American football) =

American football player, coach, and college athletics administrator

Biographical details
- Born: September 17, 1954 (age 72); Magnolia, Arkansas, U.S.

Playing career
- 1973–1975: Mississippi State
- Position: Safety

Coaching career (HC unless noted)
- 1976: Mississippi State (GA)
- 1977–1979: East Carolina (DB)
- 1980: Wyoming (DB)
- 1981–1985: Auburn (DB)
- 1986: Mississippi State (DC)
- 1987: Illinois (DB)
- 1988–1997: North Alabama
- 1998–2005: Temple
- 2006–2010: West Alabama
- 2012–2016: North Alabama

Administrative career (AD unless noted)
- 2018–2021: West Alabama

Head coaching record
- Overall: 171–152–1
- Tournaments: 20–8 (NCAA D-II playoffs)

Accomplishments and honors

Championships
- 3 NCAA Division II (1993–1995); 7 GSC (1993–1995, 2013–2016)

Awards
- 4× GSC Coach of The Year (1993–1995, 2016)

Robert Hue Wallace (born September 17, 1954) is an American former college football coach and athletics administrator. He served as head football coach at the University of North Alabama from 1988 to 1997 and again from 2012 to 2016, at Temple University from 1998 to 2005, and at the University of West Alabama from 2006 to 2010. Wallace led the North Alabama Lions to three consecutive NCAA Division II Football Championships, from 1993 to 1995. He was also the athletic director at West Alabama from 2018 to 2021.

== Playing career ==
Wallace was a multi-sport athlete at Callaway High School in Jackson, Mississippi, lettering three years each in football, basketball, baseball, and track. He also earned prep All-America honors before enrolling at Mississippi State University. After starting for three seasons as a defensive back at MSU under Bob Tyler, Wallace earned his Bachelor of Science degree in Physical Education in 1976 and stayed the following year to serve the Bulldogs as a graduate assistant coach.

== Coaching career ==
=== Assistant coaching career ===
Wallace started his coaching career as a graduate assistant at Mississippi State University in 1976. The following season, he joined Hall of Fame coach Pat Dye's staff at East Carolina to coach defensive backs. He followed Dye to Wyoming and Auburn, before returning to his alma-mater Mississippi State as defensive coordinator. During his tenure at Auburn, Wallace was noted for recruiting standout running back Bo Jackson. In 1987, he coached defensive backs at Illinois.

=== North Alabama ===
Bobby Wallace's career as a head coach began in 1988 when he was named head coach at the University of North Alabama (UNA) in Florence, Alabama. He compiled a record of 82–36–1 in 10 seasons (1988–1997) at UNA, leading the Lions to three consecutive Division II national championships in 1993, 1994 and 1995. During those three seasons, the Lions recorded an overall record of 41–1, losing only to the eventual Division I-AA national champion Youngstown State in 1994. The 1995 UNA team was named the "Best Team of the Quarter Century" in Division II.

Wallace's UNA teams also won three consecutive Gulf South Conference championships (1993–1995), qualified for the Division II playoffs six times, and sent 12 players to the National Football League (NFL). In 1995, Lions linebacker Ronald McKinnon became the first and, as of 2016, only defensive player to win the Division II Harlon Hill Trophy. He resigned at UNA following the 1997 season to become the head coach at Temple University.

=== Temple ===
Wallace became the 23rd head coach at Temple University on December 7, 1997. He coached the Owls for eight seasons, compiling a record of 19–71. Although his first team at Temple finished 2–9, one of the wins became arguably one of the biggest upsets in college football history. On October 17, 1998, the 0–6 Owls traveled to Blacksburg, Virginia to play the Virginia Tech Hokies. The Owls overcame a 17–0 deficit and numerous injuries to upset the Hokies, 28–24. The win gave the Owls their first ever Big East road win, and their first win over a ranked opponent in 11 years. Two weeks later, the Owls won again in improbable fashion, this time overcoming a 20–0 deficit to defeat Pittsburgh.

Although his teams were consistently good defensively, none of Wallace's eight Temple teams had winning records. The Owls were winless during his final season in 2005, and played as an NCAA Division I-A independent after losing their Big East affiliation. During his tenure at Temple, Wallace had 12 players selected All-Big East. He coached All-Americans Dan Klecko and Rian Wallace.

=== West Alabama ===
Wallace was hired to be the head coach at West Alabama in March 2006. Wallace's first UWA team went 6–5, achieving the program's first winning season since 1992. In 2009 West Alabama went 8-5 and made the NCAA Division II playoffs for the first time since 1975. In 2010, he led the Tigers to a 7–4 record posting back-to-back winning seasons for the first time since 1991–92. Wallace retired from UWA following the 2010 season.

=== Return to North Alabama ===
On January 2, 2012, the University of North Alabama announced that Wallace would return as the Lions' ninth head football coach following the departure of Terry Bowden. On September 26, 2015, Wallace coached North Alabama to a school-record tying 109th career win over Florida Tech. On October 3, Wallace became the winningest head coach in program history notching his 110th win with a 34–12 victory over Valdosta State. In 2016 Wallace led the Lions to their fourth straight Gulf South Conference championship. It was the first time the feat had been accomplished in conference history. The Lions went on to play for the NCAA Division 2 National Championship where they were defeated by Northwest Missouri State Wallace retired following the 2016 season finishing his career with a 126–51–1 record at UNA and 171–152–1 overall.

== Head coaching record ==
Year	Team	Overall	Conference	Standing	Bowl/playoffs	NCAA^{#}	AFCA^{°}
North Alabama Lions (Gulf South Conference) (1988–1997)
1988	North Alabama	2–8	2–6	8th			
1989	North Alabama	6–5	4–4	5th			
1990	North Alabama	8–3	6–2	T–2nd	L NCAA Division II First Round	15	
1991	North Alabama	3–7	1–5	7th			
1992	North Alabama	7–4–1	3–2–1	T–2nd	L NCAA Division II Second Round	T–16	
1993	North Alabama	14–0	7–0	1st	W NCAA Division II Championship	1	
1994	North Alabama	13–1	7–0	1st	W NCAA Division II Championship	1	
1995	North Alabama	14–0	8–0	1st	W NCAA Division II Championship	1	
1996	North Alabama	6–5	4–4	T–5th			
1997	North Alabama	9–3	6–2	3rd	L NCAA Division II First Round	13	
Temple Owls (Big East Conference) (1998–2004)
1998	Temple	2–9	2–5	T–6th			
1999	Temple	2–9	2–5	T–6th			
2000	Temple	4–7	1–6	7th			
2001	Temple	4–7	2–5	6th			
2002	Temple	4–8	2–5	T–6th			
2003	Temple	1–11	0–7	8th			
2004	Temple	2–9	1–5	T–6th			
Temple Owls (NCAA Division I-A Independent) (2005)
2005	Temple	0–11					
Temple:		19–71	10–39				
West Alabama Tigers (Gulf South Conference) (2006–2010)
2006	West Alabama	6–5	3–5	6th			
2007	West Alabama	1–9	0–8	11th			
2008	West Alabama	4–7	2–6	T–8th			
2009	West Alabama	8–5	5–3	T–3rd	L NCAA Division II Second Round		21
2010	West Alabama	7–4	5–3	5th			
West Alabama:		26–30	15–25				
North Alabama Lions (Gulf South Conference) (2012–2016)
2012	North Alabama	5–5	2–3	T–3rd			
2013	North Alabama	10–3	5–1	T–1st	L NCAA Division II Quarterfinal		10
2014	North Alabama	9–2	6–1	T–1st	L NCAA Division II First Round		16
2015	North Alabama	9–3	6–1	T–1st	L NCAA Division II Second Round		15
2016	North Alabama	11–2	7–0	1st	L NCAA Division II Championship		2
North Alabama:		126–51–1	74–31–1				
Total:		171–152–1					
National championship Conference title Conference division title or championship game berth
