= 2016 Shepherd Rams football team =

American college football season

2016 Shepherd Rams football

MEC champion

NCAA Division II Semifinal, L 13–23 vs. North Alabama
- Conference: Mountain East Conference

Ranking
- AFCA: No. 3
- Record: 13–1 (10–0 MEC)
- Head coach: Monte Cater (30th season)
- Offensive coordinator: Ernie McCook (7th season)
- Defensive coordinator: Josh Kline (8th season)
- Home stadium: Ram Stadium

2016 Mountain East Conference football standings
	Conf.			Overall
Team	W		L	W		L
No. 3 Shepherd $^	10	–	0	13	–	1
No. 23 Fairmont State ^	9	–	1	10	–	2
Notre Dame (OH)	8	–	2	9	–	2
Virginia–Wise	5	–	5	6	–	5
Glenville State	5	–	5	5	–	6
West Liberty	4	–	6	4	–	7
West Virginia Wesleyan	4	–	6	4	–	7
Charleston (WV)	3	–	7	3	–	8
West Virginia State	3	–	7	3	–	8
Urbana	2	–	8	3	–	8
Concord	2	–	8	2	–	9
$ – Conference champion; ^ – NCAA Division II playoff participant; Rankings from AFCA poll

The 2016 Shepherd Rams football team represented Shepherd University during the 2016 NCAA Division II football season as a member of the Mountain East Conference (MEC). They were led by head coach Monte Cater, in his 30th season at Shepherd, and finished the season 13–1. With a conference record of 10–0, they were named MEC champions and advanced to the Division II Playoffs, losing in the semifinals to North Alabama. The Rams played their home games at Ram Stadium in Shepherdstown, West Virginia.

== Preseason ==
After finishing the 2015 season with a record of 13–1, with the only loss coming in the national championship game to Northwest Missouri State, the Rams were ranked #4 in the preseason poll.

== Regular season ==
The 2016 regular season for the Rams consisted of 10 games against Mountain East Conference foes. The Rams went undefeated in the regular season and were given the third seed in Super Region I in the 2016 NCAA Division II football playoffs.

== Playoffs ==
Despite going undefeated and being ranked #3 in the nation, the Rams had to play in an opening round game of the playoffs. The Rams defeated #25 Assumption College in the game, 48–31, to advance to the Round of 16.

The Rams then went on the road and were able to defeat LIU Post, 40–21, to improve to 12–0 and continue their playoff run.

In the national quarterfinals the following week, the Rams again went on the road. This time, the Rams were able to defeat California (Pa.), 41–30.

The Rams hosted a national semifinal game for the second consecutive year, losing to North Alabama, 23–13.

== Schedule ==
Date	Time	Opponent	Rank	Site	TV	Result	Attendance	Source
September 3	12:00 p.m	West Virginia Wesleyan	No. 4	Ram Stadium; Shepherdstown, WV		W 27–12	4,987	
September 8	7:30 p.m.	at Charleston (WV)	No. 4	UC Stadium; Charleston, WV		W 38–22	1,111	
September 17	12:00 p.m.	Virginia–Wise	No. 4	Ram Stadium; Shepherdstown, WV		W 64–13	4,472	
September 24	12:00 p.m.	at Notre Dame (OH)	No. 4	Mueller Field; South Euclid, OH		W 38–17	1,080	
October 8	12:00 p.m.	Glenville State	No. 3	Ram Stadium; Shepherdstown, WV	ESPN3	W 38–7	4,189	
October 15	1:00 p.m.	at West Virginia State	No. 3	Dickerson Stadium; Institute, WV		W 70–24	311	
October 22	12:00 p.m.	Concord^{†}	No. 3	Ram Stadium; Shepherdstown, WV		W 21–7	5,211	
October 29	12:00 p.m.	at West Liberty	No. 3	West Family Stadium; West Liberty, WV		W 38–27	498	
November 5	12:00 p.m.	No. 17 Fairmont State	No. 3	Ram Stadium; Shepherdstown, WV		W 27–17	6,751	
November 12	1:00 p.m.	at Urbana	No. 3	UU Stadium; Urbana, OH		W 38–14	1,058	
November 19	12:00 p.m.	No. 25 Assumption*	No. 3	Ram Stadium; Shepherdstown, WV (NCAA Division II First Round)		W 48–31	4,571	
November 26	12:00 p.m.	at No. 10 LIU Post*	No. 3	Bethpage Stadium; Brookville, NY (NCAA Division II Second Round)		W 40–21	3,684	
December 3	1:00 p.m.	at No. 6 California (PA)*	No. 3	Adamson Stadium; California, PA (NCAA Division II quarterfinal)		W 41–30	5,113	
December 10	12:00 p.m.	No. 7 North Alabama*	No. 3	Ram Stadium; Shepherdstown, WV (NCAA Division II semifinal)	ESPN3	L 13–23	7,017	
*Non-conference game; ^{†}Homecoming; Rankings from AFCA Poll released prior to the game; All times are in Eastern time
