= Valdosta State–West Georgia football rivalry =

American college football rivalry

The Valdosta State–West Georgia rivalry Battle for the Peach Basket
- Valdosta State Blazers West Georgia Wolves
- Sport: Football
- First meeting: 1983; Valdosta State 20, West Georgia 13
- Latest meeting: November 11, 2023; Valdota State 58, West Georgia 28
- Trophy: The Peach Basket

Statistics
- Total meetings: 43
- All-time series: Valdosta State leads, 29–14
- Longest win streak: Valdosta State, 9 (1983–1991)
- Current win streak: Valdosta State, 1 (2023–Present)

Locations in Georgia

The Valdosta State–West Georgia football rivalry, commonly known as the Battle for the Peach Basket, is a college football rivalry game between two public universities in the U.S. state of Georgia, the Valdosta State University Blazers and the University of West Georgia Wolves that compete for the Peach Basket. The current winner is Valdosta State, who won, 36–34, on October 30, 2021. Valdosta State leads the all-time series, 28–14.

== History ==
The Blazers and Wolves played every year from 1983 to 2023 in the Gulf South Conference. The first two games in 1983 and 1984 were played at Memorial Stadium in Columbus. Since then, the game has alternated between the respective campuses. The early series was dominated by Valdosta State with the Blazers winning 9 games in a row from 1983 to 1991. This was inverted in the 1990s, when West Georgia won 7 of the next 8 contests. From 2000 to 2013 the series was again dominated by the Blazers, with Valdosta State winning 12 of 14 matchups, as well as 3 national championships. The Blazers won again in the 2014 regular season, but were then upset by the Wolves in the playoff quarterfinals, beginning a stretch during which the Wolves won 4 out of 5.

West Georgia announced it would move to Division I, joining the Atlantic Sun Conference for non-football sports and the football-only United Athletic Conference effective July 1, 2024, thus ending the rivalry for the foreseeable future.

== Game results ==
Valdosta State victories	West Georgia victories

No.	Date	Location	Winning team		Losing team	
1	October 22, 1983	Columbus	Valdosta State	20	West Georgia	13
2	October 20, 1984	Columbus	Valdosta State	20	West Georgia	13
3	October 26, 1985	Valdosta	Valdosta State	49	West Georgia	12
4	October 25, 1986	Carrollton	Valdosta State	41	West Georgia	26
5	October 24, 1987	Valdosta	Valdosta State	49	West Georgia	14
6	October 15, 1988	Carrollton	Valdosta State	17	West Georgia	14
7	October 14, 1989	Valdosta	Valdosta State	34	West Georgia	16
8	October 13, 1990	Carrollton	#13 Valdosta State	37	West Georgia	2
9	October 19, 1991	Valdosta	Valdosta State	38	West Georgia	37
10	October 17, 1992	Carrollton	West Georgia	42	Valdosta State	28
11	October 16, 1993	Carrollton	West Georgia	23	#7 Valdosta State	16
12	October 15, 1994	Valdosta	#3 Valdosta State	49	#15 West Georgia	33
13	November 11, 1995	Carrollton	#17 West Georgia	44	Valdosta State	6
14	November 16, 1996	Valdosta	#12 West Georgia	42	#5 Valdosta State	21
15	November 15, 1997	Carrollton	#16 West Georgia	35	Valdosta State	21
16	November 14, 1998	Carrollton	#18 West Georgia	26	Valdosta State	13
17	November 13, 1999	Valdosta	West Georgia	23	Valdosta State	16
18	November 11, 2000	Carrollton	#3 Valdosta State	45	#2 West Georgia	35
19	November 10, 2001	Valdosta	#1 Valdosta State	31	#18 West Georgia	6
20	November 16, 2002	Carrollton	#2 Valdosta State	19	West Georgia	3
21	November 15, 2003	Valdosta	#5 Valdosta State	30	West Georgia	17
22	November 6, 2004	Carrollton	#5 Valdosta State	35	West Georgia	12

No.	Date	Location	Winning team		Losing team	
23	November 5, 2005	Valdosta	West Georgia	29	#2 Valdosta State	15
24	November 9, 2006	Carrollton	#16 Valdosta State	38	West Georgia	13
25	November 8, 2007	Valdosta	#8 Valdosta State	35	West Georgia	10
26	October 30, 2008	Valdosta	#14 Valdosta State	41	West Georgia	14
27	October 29, 2009	Carrollton	Valdosta State	31	West Georgia	20
28	November 6, 2010	Valdosta	#10 Valdosta State	31	West Georgia	13
29	October 29, 2011	Valdosta	West Georgia	23	#17 Valdosta State	20
30	October 6, 2012	Carrollton	Valdosta State	42	West Georgia	7
31	October 19, 2013	Carrollton	#12 Valdosta State	35	West Georgia	30
32	October 11, 2014	Valdosta	Valdosta State	40	West Georgia	6
33	December 5, 2014*	Valdosta	#25 West Georgia	31	#21 Valdosta State	17
34	October 10, 2015	Carrollton	#2 West Georgia	49	#21 Valdosta State	28
35	November 28, 2015*	Carrollton	#7 West Georgia	27	#17 Valdosta State	20
36	October 8, 2016	Valdosta	#25 Valdosta State	38	#12 West Georgia	27
37	October 7, 2017	Carrollton	#25 West Georgia	42	Valdosta State	13
38	November 10, 2018	Valdosta	#5 Valdosta State	47	#3 West Georgia	31
39	November 16, 2019	Carrollton	#1 Valdosta State	42	West Georgia	14
40	October 30, 2021	Valdosta	#2 Valdosta State	36	#3 West Georgia	34
41	November 27, 2021*	Valdosta	#5 Valdosta State	66	#13 West Georgia	35
42	October 22, 2022	Carrollton	#25 West Georgia	54	Valdosta State	17
43	November 11, 2023	Valdosta	#17 Valdosta State	58	West Georgia	28
Series: Valdosta State leads 29–14

- The 2014*, 2015* and 2021* match-ups were in post-season play

== See also ==
- List of NCAA college football rivalry games
