= 2016 NCAA Division II football season =

American college football season

- Total No. of teams: 171
- Regular season: September 1 – November 12, 2016
- Playoffs: November 19 – December 17, 2016
- National Championship: Children's Mercy Park; Kansas City, KS; December 17, 2016
- Champion: Northwest Missouri State
- Harlon Hill Trophy: Justin Dvorak, Colorado Mines

The 2016 NCAA Division II football season, part of college football in the United States organized by the National Collegiate Athletic Association (NCAA) at the Division II level, began on September 1, 2016 and ended with the NCAA Division II Football Championship on December 17, 2016 at Children's Mercy Park in Kansas City, Kansas. Northwest Missouri State successfully defended its national title from the previous season (and won its sixth title overall) by defeating North Alabama, 29–3.

== D-II wins over FCS teams ==
September 1, 2016 - Alderson Broaddus 14, Robert Morris 7
September 3, 2016 - Texas A&M-Kingsville 31, Incarnate Word 22
September 3, 2016 - Quincy 38, Drake 35
September 3, 2016 - Western Oregon 38, Sacramento State 30
September 10, 2016 - Oklahoma Panhandle State 20, Arkansas-Pine Bluff 16
September 17, 2016 - Tuskegee 20, Florida A&M 17
September 24, 2016 - Florida Tech 28, Presbyterian 7

== Conference changes and new programs ==
=== Membership changes ===
School	Former conference	New conference
Alderson Broaddus Battlers	Independent	G-MAC
Dixie State Trailblazers	GNAC	RMAC
Kentucky Wesleyan Panthers	Independent	G-MAC
Malone Pioneers	GLIAC	G-MAC
Oklahoma Panhandle State Aggies	Independent	Lone Star
South Dakota Mines Hardrockers	GNAC	RMAC
Stillman Tigers	SIAC	Dropped program
UT Permian Basin Falcons	New program	Lone Star
West Florida Argonauts	New program	Gulf South
Western New Mexico Mustangs	RMAC	Lone Star

Mississippi College completed their transition to Division II and became eligible for the postseason.

== Conference standings ==
=== Super Region 1 ===
2016 Central Intercollegiate Athletic Association football standings
	Conf.			Overall
Team	W		L	W		L
Northern
Bowie State xy	6	–	1	7	–	4
Virginia State	5	–	2	8	–	2
Elizabeth City State	4	–	3	5	–	5
Virginia Union	4	–	3	5	–	5
Chowan	4	–	3	6	–	4
Lincoln (PA)	0	–	7	1	–	9
Southern
Winston-Salem State xy$^	7	–	0	9	–	3
Fayetteville State	4	–	3	4	–	6
Johnson C. Smith	3	–	4	3	–	7
Shaw	2	–	5	2	–	8
St. Augustine's	2	–	5	2	–	8
Livingstone	1	–	6	2	–	8
Championship: Winston–Salem St. 43, Bowie St. 33
$ – Conference champion; x – Division champion/co-champions; y – Championship game participant; ^ – NCAA Division II playoff participant; Rankings from AFCA Poll

2016 Mountain East Conference football standings
	Conf.			Overall
Team	W		L	W		L
No. 3 Shepherd $^	10	–	0	13	–	1
No. 23 Fairmont State ^	9	–	1	10	–	2
Notre Dame (OH)	8	–	2	9	–	2
Virginia–Wise	5	–	5	6	–	5
Glenville State	5	–	5	5	–	6
West Liberty	4	–	6	4	–	7
West Virginia Wesleyan	4	–	6	4	–	7
Charleston (WV)	3	–	7	3	–	8
West Virginia State	3	–	7	3	–	8
Urbana	2	–	8	3	–	8
Concord	2	–	8	2	–	9
$ – Conference champion; ^ – NCAA Division II playoff participant; Rankings from AFCA poll

2016 Northeast-10 Conference football standings
	Conf.			Overall
Team	W		L	W		L
No. 11 LIU Post y$^	9	–	0	12	–	1
Assumption y^	8	–	1	9	–	3
New Haven	6	–	3	7	–	4
Southern Connecticut	6	–	3	6	–	5
Bentley	5	–	4	5	–	6
Stonehill	4	–	5	5	–	6
American International	3	–	6	4	–	7
Merrimack	2	–	7	3	–	8
Saint Anselm	2	–	7	2	–	9
Pace	0	–	9	0	–	11
Championship: LIU Post 43, Assumption 23
$ – Conference champion; y – Championship game participant; ^ – NCAA Division II playoff participant; Rankings from AFCA poll

2016 Pennsylvania State Athletic Conference football standings
	Conf.			Overall
Team	W		L	W		L
Eastern
Kutztown xy	7	–	0	7	–	4
West Chester	6	–	1	8	–	3
Shippensburg	4	–	3	7	–	4
Bloomsburg	4	–	3	6	–	5
Lock Haven	4	–	3	4	–	7
East Stroudsburg	2	–	5	4	–	7
Millersville	1	–	6	2	–	9
Cheyney	0	–	7	1	–	10
Western
No. 7 California (PA) xy$^	7	–	0	11	–	1
No. 12 IUP ^	6	–	1	10	–	2
Edinboro	5	–	2	9	–	2
Slippery Rock	3	–	4	7	–	4
Clarion	3	–	4	4	–	7
Seton Hill	2	–	5	5	–	6
Gannon	1	–	6	5	–	6
Mercyhurst	1	–	6	3	–	8
Championship: California (PA) 49, Kutztown 7
$ – Conference champion; x – Division champion/co-champions; y – Championship game participant; ^ – NCAA Division II playoff participant; Rankings from AFCA poll

=== Super Region 2 ===
2016 Gulf South Conference football standings
	Conf.			Overall
Team	W		L	W		L
No. 2 North Alabama $^	7	–	0	11	–	2
No. 18 Valdosta State ^	6	–	2	8	–	3
West Alabama	6	–	2	7	–	4
Florida Tech ^	5	–	2	8	–	3
West Georgia	4	–	4	7	–	4
West Florida	3	–	5	5	–	6
Delta State †	3	–	5	4	–	6
Mississippi College	1	–	7	3	–	7
Shorter	0	–	8	0	–	11
$ – Conference champion; ^ – NCAA Division II playoff participant; † – Delta State's record is officially listed as 2–8 (1–7) due to the use of ineligible players in two wins, but the opponents are not credited with wins.; Rankings from AFCA Poll

2016 South Atlantic Conference football standings
	Conf.			Overall
Team	W		L	W		L
No. 16 Newberry $^	7	–	0	10	–	2
Wingate	5	–	2	8	–	3
Catawba	5	–	2	5	–	6
Mars Hill	3	–	4	5	–	6
Tusculum	3	–	4	4	–	7
Lenoir–Rhyne	3	–	4	3	–	8
Carson–Newman	2	–	5	4	–	7
Brevard	0	–	7	1	–	10
$ – Conference champion; ^ – NCAA Division II playoff participant; Rankings from AFCA Poll

2016 Southern Intercollegiate Athletic Conference football standings
	Conf.			Overall
Team	W		L	W		L
East
Albany State x	3	–	1	5	–	4
Fort Valley State xy$	3	–	1	5	–	6
Benedict	2	–	2	5	–	5
Clark Atlanta	2	–	2	5	–	5
Morehouse	0	–	4	3	–	7
West
No. 20 Tuskegee x^	3	–	1	9	–	3
Kentucky State xy	3	–	1	4	–	7
Miles	2	–	2	5	–	5
Lane	1	–	3	5	–	5
Central State (OH)	1	–	3	1	–	9
Championship: Fort Valley State 33, Kentucky State 30 (2OT)
$ – Conference champion; x – Division champion/co-champions; y – Championship game participant; ^ – NCAA Division II playoff participant; Rankings from AFCA Poll

2016 NCAA Division II independents football records
	Conf.			Overall
Team	W		L	W		L
No. 13 UNC Pembroke ^		–		10	–	2
No. 17 North Greenville ^		–		9	–	5
Limestone		–		5	–	6
^ – NCAA Division II playoff participant; Rankings from AFCA Poll

=== Super Region 3 ===
2016 Great American Conference football standings
	Conf.			Overall
Team	W		L	W		L
No. 6 Harding $^	11	–	0	13	–	1
Southern Arkansas #	9	–	2	9	–	3
Henderson State	8	–	3	8	–	3
Ouachita Baptist	7	–	4	7	–	4
SE Oklahoma State	7	–	4	7	–	4
Arkansas Tech	6	–	5	6	–	5
SW Oklahoma State	5	–	6	5	–	6
Arkansas–Monticello	4	–	7	4	–	7
NW Oklahoma State	4	–	7	4	–	7
Oklahoma Baptist *	2	–	9	2	–	9
Southern Nazarene	2	–	9	2	–	9
East Central	1	–	10	1	–	10
$ – Conference champion; ^ – NCAA Division II playoff participant; # – Live United Texarkana Bowl participant * – Provisional Division II member; Rankings from AFCA poll

2016 Great Northwest Athletic Conference football standings
	Conf.			Overall
Team	W		L	W		L
No. 25 Azusa Pacific $^	8	–	0	9	–	3
Central Washington	6	–	2	7	–	3
Humboldt State	3	–	5	6	–	5
Western Oregon	3	–	5	4	–	6
Simon Fraser	0	–	8	0	–	10
$ – Conference champion; ^ – NCAA Division II playoff participant; Rankings from AFCA Poll

2016 Mid-America Intercollegiate Athletics Association football standings
	Conf.			Overall
Team	W		L	W		L
No. 1 NW Missouri State $^	11	–	0	15	–	0
No. 10 Emporia State ^	10	–	1	11	–	2
No. 21 Central Missouri ^	9	–	2	9	–	3
Fort Hays State #	7	–	4	8	–	4
Pittsburg State	7	–	4	7	–	4
Washburn #	7	–	4	7	–	5
Missouri Western	4	–	7	4	–	7
Central Oklahoma	3	–	8	3	–	8
Lindenwood	3	–	8	3	–	8
Missouri Southern	2	–	9	2	–	9
Northeastern State	2	–	9	2	–	9
Nebraska–Kearney	1	–	10	1	–	10
$ – Conference champion; ^ – NCAA Division II playoff participant; # – bowl participant (Wahsburn: Mineral Water Bowl, Fort Hays State: C.H.A.M.P.S. Heart of Texas Bowl; Rankings from AFCA poll)

2016 Northern Sun Intercollegiate Conference football standings
	Conf.			Overall
Team	W		L	W		L
North
No. 14 Minnesota–Duluth ^	10	–	1	10	–	2
Bemidji State #	8	–	3	9	–	3
MSU Moorhead	7	–	4	7	–	4
Northern State	6	–	5	6	–	5
St. Cloud State	5	–	6	5	–	6
Minot State	3	–	8	3	–	8
Mary	1	–	10	1	–	10
Minnesota–Crookston	0	–	11	0	–	11
South
No. 8 Sioux Falls $^	11	–	0	12	–	1
Augustana (SD)	8	–	3	8	–	3
Minnesota State	8	–	3	8	–	3
Winona State	8	–	3	8	–	3
SW Minnesota State	5	–	6	5	–	6
Upper Iowa	3	–	8	3	–	8
Wayne State (NE)	3	–	8	3	–	8
Concordia–St. Paul	2	–	9	2	–	9
$ – Conference champion; ^ – NCAA Division II playoff participant; # – Mineral Water Bowl participant; Rankings from AFCA Poll

=== Super Region 4 ===
2016 Great Lakes Intercollegiate Athletic Conference football standings
	Conf.			Overall
Team	W		L	W		L
No. 4 Grand Valley State $^	10	–	0	12	–	1
No. 5 Ferris State ^	9	–	2	12	–	3
No. 19 Ashland	7	–	2	9	–	2
Tiffin	7	–	3	8	–	3
Ohio Dominican	7	–	4	7	–	4
Wayne State (MI)	7	–	4	7	–	4
Findlay	6	–	5	6	–	5
Saginaw Valley State	5	–	5	5	–	5
Hillsdale	4	–	5	5	–	5
Michigan Tech	4	–	6	4	–	6
Northern Michigan	3	–	7	3	–	8
Northwood	3	–	8	3	–	8
Walsh	0	–	10	1	–	10
Lake Erie	0	–	11	0	–	11
$ – Conference champion; ^ – NCAA Division II playoff participant; Rankings from AFCA poll

2016 Great Lakes Valley Conference football standings
	Conf.			Overall
Team	W		L	W		L
No. 22 Southwest Baptist +^	7	–	1	10	–	2
Truman State +	7	–	1	8	–	3
McKendree	6	–	2	8	–	3
Indianapolis	5	–	3	6	–	5
Missouri S&T	4	–	4	5	–	6
Quincy	3	–	5	5	–	6
Saint Joseph's (IN)	3	–	5	5	–	6
William Jewell	1	–	7	1	–	9
Lincoln (MO)	0	–	8	2	–	9
+ – Conference co-champions; ^ – NCAA Division II playoff participant; Rankings from AFCA Poll

2016 Lone Star Conference football standings
	Conf.			Overall
Team	W		L	W		L
No. 9 Texas A&M–Commerce $^	8	–	1	10	–	2
No. 24 Midwestern State ^	7	–	2	8	–	3
Texas A&M–Kingsville #	6	–	3	9	–	3
Eastern New Mexico #	6	–	3	7	–	5
West Texas A&M	5	–	4	6	–	5
Tarleton State	5	–	4	5	–	6
Angelo State	4	–	5	5	–	6
Western New Mexico	3	–	6	3	–	8
Oklahoma Panhandle State	1	–	8	2	–	9
UT Permian Basin	0	–	9	2	–	9
$ – Conference champion; ^ – NCAA Division II playoff participant; # – bowl participant (Texas A&M–Kingsville - Live United Texarkana Bowl, Eastern New Mexico - C.H.A.M.P.S. Heart of Texas Bowl); Rankings from AFCA poll

2016 Rocky Mountain Athletic Conference football standings
	Conf.			Overall
Team	W		L	W		L
No. 15 Colorado Mines +^	8	–	2	10	–	3
Colorado Mesa +^	8	–	2	9	–	3
CSU Pueblo +	8	–	2	8	–	3
Western State	7	–	3	7	–	4
Black Hills State	6	–	4	7	–	4
Dixie State	6	–	4	6	–	5
South Dakota Mines	4	–	6	5	–	6
Fort Lewis	3	–	7	4	–	7
Chadron State	3	–	7	3	–	8
Adams State	2	–	8	2	–	8
New Mexico Highlands	0	–	10	0	–	11
+ – Conference co-champions; ^ – NCAA Division II playoff participant; Rankings from AFCA Poll

2016 Great Midwest Athletic Conference football standings
	Conf.			Overall
Team	W		L	W		L
Alderson Broaddus $	2	–	0	7	–	2
Kentucky Wesleyan	1	–	1	3	–	8
Malone	0	–	2	1	–	8
$ – Conference champion

== Postseason ==
The 2016 NCAA Division II Football Championship Postseason involved 28 schools playing in a single-elimination tournament to determine the national champion of men's NCAA Division II college football.

The tournament began on November 19, 2016 and concluded on December 17, 2016 with the 2016 NCAA Division II National Football Championship game at Children's Mercy Park in Kansas City, Kansas.

=== Format ===
The top seven teams per super regional made up the field of 28 teams.

Twelve first-round games were conducted on the campus of one of highest seed of that matchup. In addition, one team per super regional earned first-round byes. Second-round winners met in the quarterfinals at the campus site of the highest seed. Quarterfinal winners advanced to play in the semifinals on the campus of the highest seed. The championship took place at Children's Mercy Park.

=== Qualifiers ===
The following teams were qualifiers for the 2016 NCAA Division II Football Tournament.

Conference	Team	Appearance	Last bid
PSAC	California (PA)	6th	2011
Mountain East	Fairmont State	1st	Never
PSAC	Indiana (PA)	17th	2015
Northeast-10	LIU	3rd	2005
CIAA	Winston-Salem State	2nd	2013
Mountain East	Shepherd	10th	2015
Northeast-10	Assumption	2nd	2015
MIAA	Northwest Missouri State	21st	2015
MIAA	Emporia State	4th	2015
NSIC	Minnesota–Duluth	10th	2014
NSIC	Sioux Falls	3rd	2015
GNAC	Azusa Pacific	1st	Never
Great American	Harding	2nd	2014
MIAA	Central Missouri	3rd	2010
Gulf South	North Alabama	21st	2015
Gulf South	Valdosta State	15th	2015
Independent	UNC Pembroke	3rd	2013
South Atlantic	Newberry	4th	2015
SIAC	Tuskegee	4th	2015
Gulf South	Florida Tech	1st	Never
Independent	North Greenville	2nd	2011
GLIAC	Grand Valley State	18th	2015
Lone Star	Texas A&M–Commerce	5th	2015
RMAC	Colorado Mesa	5th	2007
GLIAC	Ferris State	8th	2015
Lone Star	Midwestern State	7th	2015
Great Lakes Valley	Southwest Baptist	1st	Never
RMAC	Colorado Mines	4th	2014

=== Super Regional One ===
First round November 19
4	Fairmont State	13
5	IUP	62
2	LIU Post	48
7	Winston-Salem State	41
3	Shepherd	48
6	Assumption	31

Regional semifinals November 26
1	California (PA)	44
5	IUP	23
2	LIU Post	21
3	Shepherd	40

Regional Final; December 3
1	California (PA)	30
3	Shepherd	41

=== Super Regional Two ===
First round November 19
4	Valdosta State	21
5	UNC Pembroke	24
2	Newberry	33
7	Tuskegee	35
3	Florida Tech	13
6	North Greenville	27

Regional semifinals November 26
1	North Alabama	41
5	UNC Pembroke	17
7	Tuskegee	26
6	North Greenville	45

Regional Final; December 3
1	North Alabama	38
6	North Greenville	0

=== Super Regional Three ===
First round November 19
4	Emporia State	59
5	Minnesota–Duluth	26
2	Sioux Falls	34
7	Azusa Pacific	21
3	Harding	48
6	Central Missouri	31

Regional semifinals November 26
1	Northwest Missouri State	44
4	Emporia State	13
2	Sioux Falls	24
3	Harding	27†

Regional Final; December 3
1	Northwest Missouri State	35
3	Harding	0

=== Super Regional Four ===
First round November 19
4	Texas A&M–Commerce	34
5	Colorado Mesa	23
2	Ferris State	65
7	Midwestern State	34
3	Southwest Baptist	35
6	Colorado Mines	63

Regional semifinals November 26
1	Grand Valley State	55
4	Texas A&M–Commerce	32
2	Ferris State	38
6	Colorado Mines	17

Regional Final; December 3
1	Grand Valley State	32
2	Ferris State	47

† Overtime

=== Final Four ===
Teams that make it to the Final Four are re-seeded for the semifinal matches. The semifinal matchups are hosted by the team with the highest seed.

National semifinals December 10
1	Northwest Missouri State	35
4	Ferris State	20
2	Shepherd	13
3	North Alabama	23

National Championship Game; Kansas City, Kansas; December 17
1	Northwest Missouri State	29
3	North Alabama	3

== Bowl games ==
Game	Date	Location	Winning team (record)	Losing team (record)	Score	MVP
Mineral Water Bowl	December 3	Tiger Stadium; Excelsior Springs, Missouri	Bemidji State; 8–3 (8–3)	Washburn; 7–4 (7–4)	36–23	Offensive: Jordan Hein (QB, Bemidji State); Defensive: Kameel Al-Khouri (DB, Bemidji State)
Live United Bowl	December 3	Razorback Stadium; Texarkana, Arkansas	Texas A&M–Kingsville; 8–3 (6–3)	Southern Arkansas; 9–2 (9–2)	24–17	Devonte Williams (SS, Texas A&M–Kingsville)
Heart of Texas Bowl	December 3	Bulldawg Stadium; Copperas Cove, Texas	Fort Hays State; 7–4 (7–4)	Eastern New Mexico; 7–4 (6–3)	45–12	Shaquille Cooper (RB, Fort Hays State)

== Attendances ==
2016 NCAA Division II football teams with an average home attendance of at least 10,000:

Team	Total attendance	Home average
Grand Valley St.	100,388	12,549
Tuskegee	40,518	10,130

== See also ==
- 2016 NCAA Division I FBS football season
- 2016 NCAA Division I FCS football season
- 2016 NCAA Division III football season
- 2016 NAIA football season
