= 2016 NCAA Division II football rankings =

The 2016 NCAA Division II football rankings are from the American Football Coaches Association (AFCA). This is for the 2016 season.

== Legend ==
	Increase in ranking
	Decrease in ranking
	Not ranked previous week
(#–#)	Win–loss record
(Italics)	Number of first place votes
т	Tied with team above or below also with this symbol

== American Football Coaches Association poll ==
	Preseason	Week 1 Sept 6	Week 2 Sept 13	Week 3 Sept 20	Week 4 Sept 27	Week 5 Oct 4	Week 6 Oct 11	Week 7 Oct 18	Week 8 Oct 25	Week 9 Nov 1	Week 10 Nov 8	Week 11 Nov 15	Week 12 Postseason	
1.	Northwest Missouri State (29)	Northwest Missouri State (1–0) (30)	Northwest Missouri State (2–0) (30)	Northwest Missouri State (3–0) (30)	Northwest Missouri State (4–0) (30)	Northwest Missouri State (5–0) (30)	Northwest Missouri State (6–0) (30)	Northwest Missouri State (7–0) (30)	Northwest Missouri State (8–0) (30)	Northwest Missouri State (9–0) (30)	Northwest Missouri State (10–0) (30)	Northwest Missouri State (11–0) (30)	Northwest Missouri State (15–0) (30)	1.
2.	West Georgia (1)	West Georgia (1–0)	Grand Valley State (2–0)	Grand Valley State (3–0)	Grand Valley State (4–0)	Grand Valley State (5–0)	Grand Valley State (6–0)	Grand Valley State (7–0)	Grand Valley State (8–0)	Grand Valley State (9–0)	Grand Valley State (10–0)	Grand Valley State (11–0)	North Alabama (11–2)	2.
3.	Grand Valley State	Grand Valley State (1–0)	West Georgia (2–0)	West Georgia (3–0)	West Georgia (4–0)	Shepherd (4–0)	Shepherd (5–0)	Shepherd (6–0)	Shepherd (7–0)	Shepherd (8–0)	Shepherd (9–0)	Shepherd (10–0)	Shepherd (13–1)	3.
4.	Shepherd	Shepherd (1–0)	Shepherd (2–0)	Shepherd (3–0)	Shepherd (4–0)	Texas A&M–Commerce (4–0)	Midwestern State (5–0)	Midwestern State (6–0)	Sioux Falls (8–0)	Sioux Falls (9–0)	Sioux Falls (10–0)	Sioux Falls (11–0)	Grand Valley State (12–1)	4.
5.	CSU Pueblo	Ashland (1–0)	Ashland (2–0)	Ashland (3–0)	Ashland (4–0)	Henderson State (5–0)	Tuskegee (6–0)	Tuskegee (6–0)	Harding (8–0)	Harding (9–0)	Harding (10–0)	Harding (11–0)	Ferris State (12–3)	5.
6.	Ashland	Minnesota State (1–0)	Ferris State (2–0)	Texas A&M–Commerce (2–0)	Texas A&M–Commerce (3–0)	IUP (4–0)	Sioux Falls (6–0)	Sioux Falls (7–0)	California (PA) (7–0)	California (PA) (8–0)	California (PA) (9–0)	California (PA) (10–0)	Harding (13–1)	6.
7.	Minnesota State	Ferris State (1–0)	Texas A&M–Commerce (1–0)	Ferris State (3–0)	Henderson State (4–0)	Midwestern State (4–0)	California (PA) (5–0)	Harding (7–0)	North Alabama (5–1)	North Alabama (6–1)	North Alabama (7–1)	North Alabama (8–1)	California (PA) (11–1)	7.
8.	IUP	Texas A&M–Commerce (1–0)	Henderson State (2–0)	Henderson State (3–0)	IUP (3–0)	Tuskegee (5–0)	Harding (6–0)	California (PA) (6–0)	Texas A&M–Commerce (6–1)	Texas A&M–Commerce (7–1)	Texas A&M–Commerce (8–1)	Texas A&M–Commerce (9–1)	Sioux Falls (12–1)	8.
9.	Henderson State т	Henderson State (1–0)	IUP (1–0)	IUP (2–0)	Slippery Rock (4–0)	Sioux Falls (5–0)	Texas A&M–Commerce (4–1)	Texas A&M–Commerce (5–1)	Ashland (7–1)	Emporia State (8–1)	Emporia State (9–1)	Emporia State (10–1)	Texas A&M–Commerce (10–2)	9.
10.	Texas A&M–Commerce т	IUP (0–0)	Colorado Mines (2–0)	Slippery Rock (3–0)	Midwestern State (3–0)	Azusa Pacific (5–0)	North Alabama (3–1)	North Alabama (4–1)	Emporia State (7–1)	LIU Post (9–0)	LIU Post (10–0)	LIU Post (11–0)	Emporia State (11–2)	10.
11.	Slippery Rock	Colorado Mines (1–0)	Slippery Rock (2–0)	Midwestern State (2–0)	Tuskegee (4–0)	North Alabama (3–1)	Ashland (5–1)	Ashland (6–1)	LIU Post (8–0)	IUP (7–1)	IUP (8–1)	IUP (9–1)	LIU Post (12–1)	11.
12.	Ferris State	Slippery Rock (1–0)	Midwestern State (1–0)	Tuskegee (3–0)	Sioux Falls (4–0)	West Georgia (4–1)	Emporia State (5–1)	Emporia State (6–1)	IUP (6–1)	Midwestern State (7–1)	Midwestern State (8–1)	UNC Pembroke (9–1)	IUP (10–2)	12.
13.	Humboldt State	Humboldt State (1–0)	Tuskegee (2–0)	Central Missouri (3–0)	Ferris State (3–1)	Colorado Mesa (5–0)	IUP (4–1)	IUP (5–1)	Midwestern State (6–1)	Azusa Pacific (8–1)	Azusa Pacific (9–1)	Minnesota–Duluth (10–1)	UNC Pembroke (10–2)	13.
14.	Midwestern State	Midwestern State (1–0)	Central Missouri (2–0)	Sioux Falls (3–0)	Azusa Pacific (4–0)	Ferris State (4–1)	LIU Post (6–0)	LIU Post (7–0)	Valdosta State (6–1)	Tuskegee (7–1)	Tuskegee (8–1)	Newberry (10–1)	Minnesota–Duluth (10–2)	14.
15.	North Alabama	Tuskegee (1–0)	Sioux Falls (2–0)	Azusa Pacific (3–0)	Assumption (4–0)	California (PA) (4–0)	Henderson State (5–1)	Henderson State (6–1)	Azusa Pacific (7–1)	Assumption (8–1)	Assumption (9–1)	Ferris State (9–2)	Colorado Mines (10–3)	15.
16.	Indianapolis	Central Missouri (1–0)	Azusa Pacific (2–0)	Augustana (SD) (3–0)	Florida Tech (4–0)	Harding (5–0)	Slippery Rock (5–1)	Valdosta State (5–1)	Assumption (7–1)	UNC Pembroke (8–1)	UNC Pembroke (8–1)	Ashland (9–2)	Newberry (10–2)	16.
17.	Tuskegee	Sioux Falls (1–0)	Assumption (2–0)	Assumption (3–0)	Colorado Mesa (4–0)	Ashland (4–1)	Valdosta State (4–1)	Azusa Pacific (6–1)	Tuskegee (6–1)	Fairmont State (9–0)	Minnesota–Duluth (9–1)	Southwest Baptist (10–1)	North Greenville (9–5)	17.
18.	Colorado Mines	Assumption (1–0)	Augustana (SD) (2–0)	Colorado Mesa (3–0)	North Alabama (2–1)	Emporia State (4–1)	Assumption (5–1)	Assumption (6–1)	UNC Pembroke (7–1)	Minnesota–Duluth (8–1)	Ferris State (8–2)	Fairmont State (10–1)	Valdosta State (8–3)	18.
19.	Minnesota–Duluth	CSU Pueblo (0–1)	Florida Tech (2–0)	Florida Tech (3–0) т	Minnesota State (3–1)	Slippery Rock (4–1)	Azusa Pacific (5–1)	Florida Tech (5–1)	Wayne State (MI) (7–1)	Ferris State (7–2)	Newberry (9–1)	Valdosta State (8–2)	Ashland (9–2)	19.
20.	Central Missouri	North Alabama (0–1)	North Alabama (0–1)	North Alabama (1–1) т	Harding (4–0)	Southwest Baptist (5–0)	Florida Tech (4–1)	UNC Pembroke (6–1)	Fairmont State (8–0)	Newberry (8–1)	Ashland (8–2)	Central Missouri (9–2)	Tuskegee (9–3)	20.
21.	Assumption	Augustana (SD) (1–0)	Minnesota State (1–1)	Minnesota State (2–1)	UNC Pembroke (4–0)	LIU Post (5–0)	UNC Pembroke (5–1)	Bemidji State (6–1)	Minnesota–Duluth (7–1)	Ashland (7–2)	Southwest Baptist (9–1)	Colorado Mines (9–2)	Central Missouri (9–3)	21.
22.	Catawba	Florida Tech (1–0)	Valdosta State (1–0)	Bemidji State (3–0)	Central Missouri (3–1)	Assumption (4–1)	Bemidji State (5–1)	Wayne State (MI) (6–1)	Ferris State (6–2)	Southwest Baptist (8–1)	Fairmont State (9–1)	Midwestern State (8–2)	Southwest Baptist (10–2)	22.
23.	Sioux Falls	Valdosta State (1–0)	Colorado Mesa (2–0)	Colorado Mines (2–1)	Emporia State (3–1)	Florida Tech (4–1)	Colorado Mesa (5–1)	Colorado Mesa (6–1)	Newberry (7–1)	Valdosta State (6–2)	Valdosta State (7–2)	Florida Tech (8–2)	Fairmont State (10–2)	23.
24.	Emporia State	Azusa Pacific (1–0)	Bemidji State (2–0)	Humboldt State (2–1)	California (PA) (3–0)	UNC Pembroke (4–1)	West Georgia (4–2)	Minnesota–Duluth (6–1)	Wingate (7–1)	Edinboro (8–1)	Central Missouri (8–2)	Azusa Pacific (9–2) т	Midwestern State (8–3)	24.
25.	Augustana (SD)	Colorado Mesa (1–0)	Humboldt State (1–1)	Harding (3–0)	Augustana (SD) (3–1)	Bemidji State (4–1) т	Wayne State (MI) (5–1)	Ferris State (5–2)	Notre Dame (OH) (7–1) т	Central Missouri (7–2)	Colorado Mines (8–2)	Colorado Mesa (9–2) т	Azusa Pacific (9–3)	25.
26.						Valdosta State (3–1) т			Southwest Baptist (7–1) т					26.
	Preseason	Week 1 Sept 6	Week 2 Sept 13	Week 3 Sept 20	Week 4 Sept 27	Week 5 Oct 4	Week 6 Oct 11	Week 7 Oct 18	Week 8 Oct 25	Week 9 Nov 1	Week 10 Nov 8	Week 11 Nov 15	Week 12 Postseason	
		Dropped: 16 Indianapolis; 19 Minnesota–Duluth; 22 Catawba; 24 Emporia State	Dropped: 19 CSU Pueblo	Dropped: 22 Valdosta State	Dropped: 22 Bemidji State; 23 Colorado Mines; 24 Humboldt State	Dropped: 19 Minnesota State; 22 Central Missouri; 25 Augustana (SD)	Dropped: 14 Ferris State; 20 Southwest Baptist	Dropped: 16 Slippery Rock; 23 Colorado Mesa; 24 West Georgia	Dropped: 15 Henderson State; 19 Florida Tech; 21 Bemidji State	Dropped: 19 Wayne State (MI); 24 Wingate; 25 Notre Dame (OH)	Dropped: 24 Edinboro	Dropped: 14 Tuskegee; 15 Assumption	Dropped: 23 Florida Tech; 25 Colorado Mesa	
