= Orson (given name) =

Orson is a masculine given name derived from the Old French word for "bear cub" (ourson).

Notable people and characters with the name Orson include:

== People ==
- Orson M. Allaben (1808–1891), American physician and politician
- Orson Baldwin (1881–1942), American baseball player
- Orson Bean (1928–2020), American actor
- Orson W. Bennett (1841–1904), American Civil War soldier
- Orson Flagg Bullard (1834-1906), American politician
- Orson Scott Card (born 1951), American science fiction novelist
- Orson Charles (born 1991), American football player
- Orson Christensen (born 1937 or 1938), American football coach
- Orson Leon Crandall (1903–1960), United States Navy Medal of Honor recipient
- Orson Squire Fowler (1809–1887), American phrenologist and lecturer
- Orson S. Head (1817–1875), American attorney and politician
- Orson Pratt Huish (1851–1932), British-born American hymnwriter and artist
- Orson Hyde (1805–1878), American religious leader
- Orson Kinney (1894–1966), American basketball player and coach
- Orson Lowell (1871–1956), American artist and illustrator
- Orson K. Miller Jr. (1930–2006), American mycologist
- Orson Mobley (born 1963), American gridiron football player
- Orson Desaix Munn (1824–1907), Publisher of the Scientific American
- Orson Desaix Munn II (1883–1958), American editor and publisher
- Orson Oblowitz, American filmmaker and cinematographer
- Orson Minott Oviatt (1799–1869), American general and postmaster
- Orson James Phelps (1820–1897), Canadian politician
- Orson Schofield Phelps (1817–1905), Adirondack guide
- Orson Pratt (1811–1881), American mathematician and Mormon religious leader
- Orson Reed (1809 – c. 1890), American politician
- Orson Spencer (1802–1855), American Mormon leader
- Orson William Stow (1820–1883), American politician
- Orson Swindle (born 1937), American politician
- Orson Welles (1915–1985), American actor and filmmaker
- Orson F. Whitney (1855–1931), American religious leader

== Fictional characters ==
- Orson Hodge, a fictional character on the ABC television series Desperate Housewives; played by Kyle MacLachlan
- Orson Krennic, a character in the Star Wars franchise film Rogue One; played by Ben Mendelsohn

== See also ==
- Orson (disambiguation)
