= 1968 Doane Tigers football team =

College football season

1968 Doane Tigers football

Mineral Water Bowl champion

Mineral Water Bowl, W 10–0 vs. Central Missouri State
- Conference: Independent
- Record: 10–0
- Head coach: Al Papik (14th season)
- Home stadium: Simon Field

1968 NAIA independents football records
	Conf.			Overall
Team	W	L	T	W		L		T
No. 7 Doane		–		10	–	0	–	0
New Mexico Highlands		–		9	–	0	–	0
No. 15 Ferris State		–		7	–	0	–	1
No. 9 Cal Lutheran		–		9	–	1	–	0
No. 10 Emory and Henry		–		9	–	1	–	0
Indiana (PA)		–		9	–	1	–	0
No. 16 Austin		–		8	–	1	–	0
No. 11 Appalachian State		–		8	–	2	–	0
Boise State		–		8	–	2	–	0
No. 20 Carson–Newman		–		8	–	2	–	0
La Verne		–		7	–	2	–	0
Hillsdale		–		6	–	3	–	0
St. Mary of the Plains		–		6	–	4	–	0
Oklahoma Panhandle State		–		5	–	5	–	1
Eastern New Mexico		–		4	–	5	–	1
Simon Fraser		–		4	–	5	–	0
Southern Colorado State		–		4	–	6	–	0
Southwest State (MN)		–		3	–	5	–	0
Wofford		–		4	–	7	–	0
Westminster (UT)		–		3	–	6	–	0
Georgetown (KY)		–		2	–	6	–	0
Azusa Pacific		–		2	–	7	–	0
Kentucky State		–		2	–	7	–	0
Missouri Southern		–		2	–	8	–	0
Iowa Wesleyan		–		1	–	7	–	1
Rankings from NAIA poll

The 1968 Doane Tigers football team was an American football team that represented Doane University as an independent during the 1968 NAIA football season. In their 14th year under head coach Al Papik, the team compiled a 10–0 record, including a victory over Central Missouri State in the Mineral Water Bowl.

The 1968 season was the third of four consecutive undefeated seasons and part of a 38-game undefeated streak that began with the last two games of the 1965 season and continued until September 19, 1970.

The team was led on offense by junior quarterback Larry Green and sophomore halfback Mike Sallier. Sallier became the first Doane back to rush for over 1,000 yards in a season and also led the NAIA with 23 touchdowns for 138 points. The team also excelled on defense, holding opponents to an average of 6.4 points per game and limiting Graceland to minus 111 rushing yards.

The team played its home games at Simon Field in Crete, Nebraska.

== Schedule ==
Date	Opponent	Site	Result	Attendance	Source
September 14	Dana	Simon Field; Crete, NE	W 34–0		
September 21	at Concordia (NE)	Seward, NE	W 26–12		
September 28	at Tarkio	Tarkio, MO	W 61–6		
October 5	Midland	Simon Field; Crete, NE	W 59–13		
October 12	at Southwest Minnesota	Marshall, MN	W 55–7		
October 19	Hastings^{†}	Simon Field; Crete, NE	W 48–13		
October 26	Dakota Wesleyan	Simon Fielld; Crete, NE	W 54–0		
November 2	at Nebraska Wesleyan	Magee Stadium; Lincoln, NE	W 77–6		
November 9	Graceland	Simon Field; Crete, NE	W 62–7		
November 30	vs. Central Missouri State	Excelsior Springs, MO (Mineral Water Bowl)	W 10–0	6,000–7,000	
^{†}Homecoming
