= Al Papik =

American football player and coach (1926–2022)

Biographical details
- Born: August 25, 1926; Crete, Nebraska, U.S.
- Died: May 7, 2022 (aged 95); Lincoln, Nebraska, U.S.

Playing career
- 1946–1949: Doane
- Position: Guard

Coaching career (HC unless noted)
- 1955–1970: Doane

Administrative career (AD unless noted)
- 1955–?: Doane

Head coaching record
- Overall: 80–52–9
- Bowls: 1–0–1

Accomplishments and honors

Championships
- 1 NIAC (1969)

Elvin A. "Al" Papik (August 25, 1926 – May 7, 2022) was an American football coach. He served as the 26th head football coach at Doane College in Crete, Nebraska, for 16 seasons, from 1955 until 1970. His coaching record at Doane was 80–52–9.

Papik twice took his team to the Mineral Water Bowl, scoring a 14–14 tie against William Jewell in 1967 and recording a 10–0 victory against Central Missouri State in 1968. The 1968 season gave Doane an undefeated 10–0 schedule, outscoring their opponents 468 to 64.

Celebrating Papik’s influence on the universities athletics, Doane’s football stadium was renamed ‘Al Papik Field.’

== Head coaching record ==
Year	Team	Overall	Conference	Standing	Bowl/playoffs	NAIA^{#}
Doane Tigers (Nebraska College Conference) (1955–1962)
1955	Doane	3–4–1	3–4	5th		
1956	Doane	4–4–1	2–4–1	6th		
1957	Doane	6–2	5–2	3rd		
1958	Doane	3–6	3–6	7th		
1959	Doane	5–3–1	5–3–1	4th		
1960	Doane	4–5	2–4	T–5th		
1961	Doane	5–2–2	2–2–2	T–4th		
1962	Doane	2–5–1	1–4	T–5th		
Doane Tigers (Nebraska College Conference / Great Plains College Association) (1963)
1963	Doane	3–6	2–3 / 0–3	4th / 4th		
Doane Tigers (Great Plains College Association) (1964)
1964	Doane	3–5–1	1–2	3rd		
Doane Tigers (NAIA independent) (1965–1968)
1965	Doane	3–6				
1966	Doane	7–0–1				12
1967	Doane	8–0–1			T Mineral Water	17
1968	Doane	10–0			W Mineral Water	7
Doane Tigers (Nebraska Intercollegiate Athletic Conference) (1969–1970)
1969	Doane	8–0	5–0	1st		11
1970	Doane	6–4	2–3	T–3rd		
Doane:		80–52–9	33–38–4			
Total:		80–52–9				
National championship Conference title Conference division title or championship game berth
^{#}Rankings from NAIA poll.
