= 1969 Doane Tigers football team =

College football season

1969 Doane Tigers football

NIAC champion
- Conference: Nebraska Intercollegiate Athletic Conference
- Record: 8–0 (5–0 NIAC)
- Head coach: Al Papik (15th season)
- Captains: Dick Held; Larry Green; Paul Schelstraete
- Home stadium: Simon Field

1969 Nebraska Intercollegiate Athletic Conference football standings
	Conf.					Overall
Team	W		L		T	W		L		T
No. 11 Doane $	5	–	0	–	0	8	–	0	–	0
Nebraska Wesleyan	4	–	1	–	0	5	–	4	–	0
Concordia (NE)	1	–	2	–	1	4	–	5	–	1
Midland	1	–	3	–	0	1	–	7	–	0
Dana	0	–	3	–	1	2	–	6	–	1
Hastings	0	–	2	–	0	2	–	6	–	0
$ – Conference champion; Rankings from NAIA poll

The 1969 Doane Tigers football team was an American football team that represented Doane University as a member of the Nebraska Intercollegiate Athletic Conference (NIAC) during the 1969 NAIA football season. In their 15th year under head coach Al Papik, the team compiled an 8–0 record (5–0 against NIAC opponents), won the NIAC championship, and outscored opponents by a total of 272 to 95. Doane was ranked No. 11 in the final NAIA rankings in late November.

The 1969 season was the fourth of four consecutive undefeated seasons and part of a 38-game undefeated streak that began with the last two games of the 1965 season and continued until September 19, 1970. In October 1969, Sports Illustrated published a feature story on the rise of Doane football, noting,

That Doane, with an enrollment of 738 (492 boys), should become a football power is as surprising as if Ohio State gave up the game. The school itself was founded 97 years ago and, though it started playing football in 1895, never, never before has there been anything like this.

Doane tailback Mike Sallier rushed for 1,054 yards on 229 carries, averaged 131.77 rushing yards per game, and scored 96 points in eight games. Doane quarterback Larry Green ranked among the NAIA leaders with 1,054 passing yards, an average of 195.7 yards per game. Larry Green, Dick Held, and Paul Schelstraete were the team captains. Held, a senior linebacker, wrote a weekly column in the school newspaper chronicling the season.

At the end of the regular season, the team was under consideration to participate in the first annual Amos Alonzo Stagg Bowl and the Mineral Water Bowl, but the players voted to refuse any postseason bowl offers.

The team played its home games at Simon Field in Crete, Nebraska.

== Schedule ==
Date	Opponent	Site	Result	Attendance	Source
September 13	at Dana	Blair, NE	W 41–0		
September 20	Concordia (NE)	Simon Field; Crete, NE	W 47–14		
September 27	Tarkio*	Simon Field; Crete, NE	W 35–27		
October 4	at Midland	Fremont, NE	W 40–16		
October 11	Southwest Minnesota*	Simon Field; Crete, NE	W 3–0		
October 18	at Hastings	Hastings, NE	W 42–7		
October 25	at Dakota Wesleyan*	Mitchell, SD	W 35–7		
November 1	Nebraska Wesleyan^{†}	Simon Field; Crete, NE	W 28–24		
*Non-conference game; ^{†}Homecoming

== Players ==
- Louis Cooper, defensive guard, junior, 6'5", 256 pounds
- Larry Green, quarterback, senior, 5'10", 200 pounds
- Kevin Hunt, defensive tackle, junior, 6'5", 256 pounds
- Jim Katzmann, defensive back, junior, 5'10", 170 pounds
- Mike Sallier, tailback, junior, 5'6", 155 pounds
