= Ben Beck =

American football and basketball coach (1889–1968)

Biographical details
- Born: April 14, 1889; Bartley, Nebraska, U.S.
- Died: January 26, 1968 (aged 78); Woodstock, Vermont, U.S.
- Education: University of Nebraska

Coaching career (HC unless noted)

Football
- 1919: Nebraska Wesleyan
- 1921–1923: Hamline
- 1926–1927: Medford HS (MA)
- 1928–1941: Middlebury

Basketball
- 1919–1920: Nebraska Wesleyan
- early 1920s: Hamline
- 1926–1928: Medford HS (MA)
- 1928–1942: Middlebury

Head coaching record
- Overall: 67–67–6 (college football); 86–110 (college basketball, excluding Hamline)

Accomplishments and honors

Championships
- Football; 1 MIAC (1921)

Benjamin Harlow Beck (April 14, 1889 – January 26, 1968) was an American college football and basketball coach. He served as the head football coach at Nebraska Wesleyan University in 1919, at Hamline University from 1921 to 1923, and at Middlebury College from 1928 to 1941. Beck was hired as coach of all freshmen athletics at Brown University in 1924.

Beck was born April 14, 1889, in Bartley, Nebraska, to Charles and Sarah (Dillon) Beck. He attended Nebraska Wesleyan and graduated from the University of Nebraska with a Bachelor of Science degree. Beck died on January 26, 1968, at Guthrie Nursing Home in Woodstock, Vermont.

== Head coaching record ==
=== College football ===
Year	Team	Overall	Conference	Standing	Bowl/playoffs
Nebraska Wesleyan Coyotes (Nebraska Intercollegiate Conference) (1919)
1919	Nebraska Wesleyan	7–2	6–1	2nd	
Nebraska Wesleyan:		7–2	6–1		
Hamline Pipers (Minnesota Intercollegiate Athletic Conference) (1921)
1921	Hamline	7–0	5–0	1st	
Hamline Pipers (Midwest Conference / Minnesota Intercollegiate Athletic Conference) (1922–1923)
1922	Hamline	4–2–1	2–1 / 3–1	4th / 3rd	
1923	Hamline	4–3	0–3 / 3–1	T–7th / T–2nd	
Hamline:		14–5–1	12–5		
Middlebury Panthers (Independent) (1928–1941)
1928	Middlebury	1–6–1			
1929	Middlebury	3–5			
1930	Middlebury	2–6			
1931	Middlebury	3–5			
1932	Middlebury	4–4			
1933	Middlebury	6–1–1			
1934	Middlebury	3–3–1			
1935	Middlebury	1–6–1			
1936	Middlebury	8–0			
1937	Middlebury	6–2			
1938	Middlebury	5–3			
1939	Middlebury	3–4–1			
1940	Middlebury	0–8			
1941	Middlebury	1–7			
Middlebury:		46–60–5			
Total:		67–67–6			
National championship Conference title Conference division title or championship game berth
