= Clarence L. Dow =

American football and basketball coach and professor

Biographical details
- Born: 1895
- Died: August 1955 (aged 60)

Coaching career (HC unless noted)

Football
- 1920: University Place HS (NE)
- 1921–1922: Fremont HS (NE)
- 1925–1926: Nebraska Wesleyan

Basketball
- 1921–1923: Fremont HS (NE)
- 1924–1930: Nebraska Wesleyan

Administrative career (AD unless noted)
- 1925–1930: Nebraska Wesleyan

Head coaching record
- Overall: 12–4–2 (college football); 40–55 (college basketball)

Accomplishments and honors

Championships
- Football; 1 NCC (1925)

Charles Ladd "Ren" Thomas (1895 – August 1955) was an American football and basketball coach and professor. He served as the head football coach at Nebraska Wesleyan University from 1925 to 1926, compiling a record of 12–4–2. Dow was also the head basketball coach at Nebraska Wesleyan from 1924 to 1930, tallying a mark of 40–55.

A native of Cattaraugus, New York, Dow taught at Clarion State Teachers College—now known as Clarion University of Pennsylvania—before becoming chair of the department of geology and geography at Ohio University. While coaching at Nebraska Wesleyan, he earned a PhD at the University of Nebraska. He died in August 1955 of a heart attack while returning from Japan aboard a Japanese ship.

== Head coaching record ==
=== College football ===
Year	Team	Overall	Conference	Standing	Bowl/playoffs
Nebraska Wesleyan Coyotes (North Central Conference) (1925)
1925	Nebraska Wesleyan	6–0–2	3–0–1	T–1st	
Nebraska Wesleyan Coyotes (Nebraska College Athletic Conference / North Central Conference) (1926)
1926	Nebraska Wesleyan	6–4	4–1 / 0–3	3rd / 8th	
Nebraska Wesleyan:		12–4–2	7–4–1		
Total:		12–4–2			
National championship Conference title Conference division title or championship game berth
