= Brian Keller (American football) =

American football coach (born c. 1961)

Biographical details
- Born: c. 1961 (age 64–65); Seward, Nebraska, U.S.
- Education: Nebraska Wesleyan University (1983); Eastern Oregon University (1991)

Playing career
- 1979–1982: Nebraska Wesleyan
- Positions: Defensive lineman, linebacker

Coaching career (HC unless noted)
- 1983: Seward HS (NE) (WR/OLB)
- 1984–1986: Nebraska Wesleyan (OL)
- 1987–1995: Eastern Oregon (ST/OL)
- 1996–2025: Nebraska Wesleyan

Head coaching record
- Overall: 133–159
- Tournaments: 0–1 (NAIA playoffs)

Accomplishments and honors

Championships
- 1 GPAC (2000)

Awards
- GPAC Co-Coach of the Year (2000)

Brian Keller (born c. 1961) is an American former college football coach. He is best known for his time as the head football coach for Nebraska Wesleyan University, a position he held from 1996 to 2025. He previously served as an assistant coach for Seward High School, Nebraska Wesleyan, and Eastern Oregon. He played college football for Nebraska Wesleyan as a defensive lineman and linebacker.

== Head coaching record ==
Year	Team	Overall	Conference	Standing	Bowl/playoffs	NAIA^{#}
Nebraska Wesleyan Plainsmen / Prairie Wolves (Nebraska–Iowa Athletic Conference / Great Plains Athletic Conference) (1996–2015)
1996	Nebraska Wesleyan	2–8	1–5	6th		
1997	Nebraska Wesleyan	5–5	4–4	T–3rd		
1998	Nebraska Wesleyan	6–4	4–4	4th		
1999	Nebraska Wesleyan	4–6	1–5	7th		
2000	Nebraska Wesleyan	8–3	6–2	T–1st	L NAIA First Round	13
2001	Nebraska Wesleyan	5–5	3–5	T–5th		
2002	Nebraska Wesleyan	6–4	4–4	T–5th		
2003	Nebraska Wesleyan	6–4	6–4	T–3rd		
2004	Nebraska Wesleyan	6–4	6–4	T–5th		
2005	Nebraska Wesleyan	5–5	5–5	5th		
2006	Nebraska Wesleyan	7–3	7–3	4th		23
2007	Nebraska Wesleyan	7–3	7–3	4th		22
2008	Nebraska Wesleyan	7–3	7–3	T–3rd		
2009	Nebraska Wesleyan	5–5	5–5	6th		
2010	Nebraska Wesleyan	4–6	4–6	7th		
2011	Nebraska Wesleyan	5–5	4–5	7th		
2012	Nebraska Wesleyan	6–4	5–4	T–4th		
2013	Nebraska Wesleyan	6–4	6–3	4th		
2014	Nebraska Wesleyan	4–6	4–5	T–6th		
2015	Nebraska Wesleyan	4–6	3–6	7th		
Nebraska Wesleyan Prairie Wolves (Iowa Conference / American Rivers Conference) (2016–2025)
2016	Nebraska Wesleyan	4–6	3–5	T–5th		
2017	Nebraska Wesleyan	2–8	2–6	T–7th		
2018	Nebraska Wesleyan	3–7	2–6	7th		
2019	Nebraska Wesleyan	3–7	1–7	T–7th		
2020–21	Nebraska Wesleyan	0–1	0–1	T–4th		
2021	Nebraska Wesleyan	4–6	2–6	7th		
2022	Nebraska Wesleyan	1–9	0–8	9th		
2023	Nebraska Wesleyan	4–6	2–6	T–6th		
2024	Nebraska Wesleyan	3–7	2–6	T–6th		
2025	Nebraska Wesleyan	1–9	1–7	8th		
Nebraska Wesleyan:		133–159	107–143			
Total:		133–159				
National championship Conference title Conference division title or championship game berth

== See also ==
- List of current NCAA Division III football coaches
- List of college football career coaching losses leaders
