= Orson Christensen =

American football coach (born 1937 or 1938)

Biographical details
- Born: c. 1937 or 1938 (age 88–89); Oak Harbor, Washington, U.S.

Playing career

Football
- 1957–1960: Pacific Lutheran
- Positions: Offensive lineman, defensive lineman

Coaching career (HC unless noted)

Football
- 1961–1963: Winlock HS (WA) (assistant)
- 1964–1968: Avenal HS (CA)
- 1969–1970: Thomas Jefferson HS (WA)
- 1971–1974: W. F. West HS (WA)
- 1975–1980: Olympic
- 1981: Puget Sound (OB)
- 1982–1986: Nebraska Wesleyan
- 1987–1996: Eastern Oregon
- 1997–1998: Western Washington (TE/OL)
- 1999: Dakota Wesleyan
- 2000: Western Washington (assistant)
- 2001–2004: Vashon HS (WA)
- 2005–2009: Aberdeen HS (WA)
- 2010: Rainier HS (WA)
- 2011–2012: Wapato HS (WA)
- 2013–2014: Coupeville HS (WA) (assistant)
- 2019: Oak Harbor HS (WA) (assistant)

Basketball
- 1961–1963: Winlock HS (WA) (assistant)
- 1964–1968: Avenal HS (CA)

Administrative career (AD unless noted)
- 1982–1986: Nebraska Wesleyan
- 1999–2000: Dakota Wesleyan

Head coaching record
- Overall: 53–98 (college football); 22–31 (junior college football)

Accomplishments and honors

Championships
- Football; 1 NWAACC (1980); 2 NIAC (1983, 1986)

Awards
- Football; 1 NWAACC Coach of the Year (1980)

Orson Christensen (born c. 1937 or 1938) is an American college football coach. He was the head football coach for Avenal High School from 1964 to 1968, Thomas Jefferson High School from 1969 to 1970, W. F. West High School from 1971 to 1974, Olympic Community College—now known as Olympic College—from 1975 to 1980, Nebraska Wesleyan University from 1982 to 1986, Eastern Oregon State College—now known as Eastern Oregon University—from 1987 to 1996, Dakota Wesleyan University in 1999, Vashon High School from 2001 to 2004, Aberdeen High School from 2005 to 2009, Rainier High School in 2010, and Wapato High School from 2011 to 2012.

== Playing career ==
Christensen was a four-sport athlete for Oak Harbor High School and graduated in 1957. He then enrolled at Pacific Lutheran where he played college football for the Lutes as an offensive and defensive lineman. He earned letters all four years he played.

== Coaching career ==
In 1961, Christensen accepted his first coaching positions as an assistant football and basketball coach for Winlock High School. After four years of coaching and teaching social studies he moved to California and became the head football and head basketball coach for Avenal High School. In 1969, he began his two-year stint with Thomas Jefferson High School as he moved back to Washington as head coach. In 1971, he was hired away from Thomas Jefferson by W. F. West High School.

After fourteen seasons, ten of which as a head coach, in the high school ranks Christensen was hired as the head football coach for Olympic, a community college in Bremerton, Washington. He was head coach for six years and led the team to a 22–31 record. For half of his tenure, the school threatened the program with disbandment but ultimately was retained through the end of Christensen's time with the team. He had his best season in his last season as he led the team to an 8–2 record and a Northwest Athletic Association of Community Colleges (NWAACC) championship.

In 1981, Christensen was named the offensive backfield coach for Puget Sound and served as an unofficial offensive coordinator. In his lone season with the Loggers, the team went 10–2 and made a trip to the NCAA Division III playoffs.

In 1982, Christensen returned to the head coaching ranks as he was hired to be the successor to longtime coach Harold G. Chaffee at Nebraska Wesleyan. After a 4–5 freshman season he led the Plainsmen to a 7–3 record and a share of the Nebraska Intercollegiate Athletic Conference (NIAC) title. After two winning seasons at 6–4 and 6–5, he led the team to an outright NIAC championship and a 7–3 record in his last season in 1986. The team also finished undefeated in conference play and ranked twelfth in the NAIA Division II. He ended his tenure with a 30–20 overall record and two conference championships.

In 1987, Eastern Oregon hired Christensen away from Nebraska Wesleyan as the team's next head coach. With the Mountaineers, he took over a struggling program that continued to struggle even after his hiring. In ten seasons as head coach, he led the team to a 23–68 record, including five seasons with one or fewer wins and two back-to-back winless seasons in his first three seasons as head coach. His best season came in his last in 1997 when the Mountaineers finished 6–4 for their first winning season since 1982 under Don Turner. He resigned following the 1997 season.

After ten seasons as head coach for Eastern Oregon, Christensen returned to Washington as the tight ends and offensive line coach for Western Washington under head coach Rob Smith. He helped lead the team to a back-to-back 5–5 seasons before being hired as the head football coach for Dakota Wesleyan. In his lone season with the Tigers, they went 0–10, which was also their last season in the South Dakota-Iowa Intercollegiate Conference (SDIIC). He resigned after one season. In 2000, he returned to Western Washington as an assistant coach.

After 26 seasons coaching college football, Christensen returned to coaching high school football as he coached Vashon Island High School from 2001 to 2004. From 2005 to 2009, he coached Aberdeen High School. In 2010, he was named the first head coach for Rainier High School. He departed for Wapato High School after one season. In 2013 and 2014 he coached his as an assistant coach for Coupeville High School. In 2019, he returned to coaching as an assistant for his alma mater, Oak Harbor.

During Christensen's tenure as football coach for Nebraska Wesleyan and Dakota Wesleyan, he served as athletic director for both schools.

== Head coaching record ==
=== College football ===
Year	Team	Overall	Conference	Standing	Bowl/playoffs	NAIA DII^{#}
Nebraska Wesleyan Plainsmen (Nebraska Intercollegiate Athletic Conference) (1982–1986)
1982	Nebraska Wesleyan	4–5	2–3	5th		
1983	Nebraska Wesleyan	7–3	4–1	T–1st		
1984	Nebraska Wesleyan	6–4	3–2	3rd		
1985	Nebraska Wesleyan	6–5	2–3	T–3rd		
1986	Nebraska Wesleyan	7–3	5–0	1st		14
Nebraska Wesleyan:		30–20	16–9			
Eastern Oregon Mountaineers (Columbia Football League) (1987)
1987	Eastern Oregon	1–8	0–6	7th (Southern)		
Eastern Oregon Mountaineers (Columbia Football Association) (1988–1996)
1988	Eastern Oregon	0–9	0–6	7th (MHL)		
1989	Eastern Oregon	0–9	0–6	7th (MHL)		
1990	Eastern Oregon	3–6	3–3	T–3rd (MHL)		
1991	Eastern Oregon	4–5	2–4	T–5th (MHL)		
1992	Eastern Oregon	3–6	3–3	T–3rd (MHL)		
1993	Eastern Oregon	4–5	2–3	T–4th (MHL)		
1994	Eastern Oregon	1–8	0–5	6th (MHL)		
1995	Eastern Oregon	1–8	1–4	T–5th (MRL)		
1996	Eastern Oregon	6–4	2–3	T–4th		
Eastern Oregon:		23–68	13–43			
Dakota Wesleyan Tigers (South Dakota-Iowa Intercollegiate Conference) (1999)
1999	Dakota Wesleyan	0–10	0–5	6th		
Dakota Wesleyan:		0–10	0–5			
Total:		53–98				
National championship Conference title Conference division title or championship game berth

=== Junior college football ===
Year	Team	Overall	Conference	Standing	Bowl/playoffs
Olympic Rangers (Northwest Community College Conference / Northwest Athletic Association of Community Colleges) (1975–1980)
1975	Olympic	5–4	5–3	3rd (Western)	
1976	Olympic	2–7	2–7	5th (Western)	
1977	Olympic	1–7	1–7	T–3rd (Western)	
1978	Olympic	1–7	1–6	T–3rd (Northern)	
1979	Olympic	5–4	3–3	4th	
1980	Olympic	8–2	5–1	1st	
Olympic:		22–31	17–27		
Total:		22–31			
National championship Conference title Conference division title or championship game berth
