= 2016 Central Missouri Mules football team =

American college football season

2016 Central Missouri Mules football

NCAA Division II First Round, L 31–48 at Harding
- Conference: Mid-America Intercollegiate Athletics Association

Ranking
- Coaches: No. 20
- Record: 9–3 (9–2 MIAA)
- Head coach: Jim Svoboda (7th season)
- Offensive coordinator: John McMenamin (2nd season)
- Defensive coordinator: Wes Bell (1st season)
- Home stadium: Audrey J. Walton Stadium

2016 Mid-America Intercollegiate Athletics Association football standings
| | Conf. | | | Overall |
| Team | W | | L | W | | L |
|---|---|---|---|---|---|---|
| No. 1 NW Missouri State $^ | 11 | – | 0 | 15 | – | 0 |
| No. 10 Emporia State ^ | 10 | – | 1 | 11 | – | 2 |
| No. 21 Central Missouri ^ | 9 | – | 2 | 9 | – | 3 |
| Fort Hays State # | 7 | – | 4 | 8 | – | 4 |
| Pittsburg State | 7 | – | 4 | 7 | – | 4 |
| Washburn # | 7 | – | 4 | 7 | – | 5 |
| Missouri Western | 4 | – | 7 | 4 | – | 7 |
| Central Oklahoma | 3 | – | 8 | 3 | – | 8 |
| Lindenwood | 3 | – | 8 | 3 | – | 8 |
| Missouri Southern | 2 | – | 9 | 2 | – | 9 |
| Northeastern State | 2 | – | 9 | 2 | – | 9 |
| Nebraska–Kearney | 1 | – | 10 | 1 | – | 10 |
$ – Conference champion; ^ – NCAA Division II playoff participant; # – bowl participant (Wahsburn: Mineral Water Bowl, Fort Hays State: C.H.A.M.P.S. Heart of Texas Bowl; Rankings from AFCA poll)

The 2016 Central Missouri Mules football team represented the University of Central Missouri as a member of the Mid-America Intercollegiate Athletics Association (MIAA) during the 2016 NCAA Division II football season. Led by seventh-year head coach Jim Svoboda, the Mules compiled an overall record of 9–3 with a mark of 9–2 in conference play, placing third in the MIAA. Central Missouri advanced to the NCAA Division II Football Championship playoffs, where the Mules lost in the first round to Harding. The team played home games at Vernon Kennedy Field at Audrey J. Walton Stadium in Warrensburg, Missouri. 2016 was the 120th season in program history.

== Preseason ==
The Mules entered the 2016 season after finishing with an 8–3 record, overall and in conference play, last season under Svoboda. On August 2, 2016 at the MIAA Football Media Day, the Mules were chosen to finish in second place in both the Coaches Poll and Media Poll.

On August 15, the American Football Coaches Association released the Preseason Division II Poll, landing Central Missouri at No. 20.

On August 22, D2football.com released its Top 25 poll, ranking Central Missouri 10th.

== Schedule ==
| Date | Time | Opponent | Rank | Site | Result | Attendance |
|---|---|---|---|---|---|---|
| September 1 | 7:00 p.m. | at Pittsburg State | No. 20 | Carnie Smith Stadium; Pittsburg, KS | W 34–27 | 9,311 |
| September 8 | 7:00 p.m. | Fort Hays State | No. 16 | Audrey J. Walton Stadium; Warrensburg, MO | W 34–17 | 7,279 |
| September 17 | 6:00 p.m. | at Missouri Western | No. 14 | Spratt Stadium; St. Joseph, MO | W 38–34 | 6,533 |
| September 24 | 1:00 p.m. | Emporia State | No. 13 | Audrey J. Walton Stadium; Warrensburg, MO | L 31–37 ^{2OT} | 7,995 |
| October 1 | 5:00 p.m. | at No. 1 Northwest Missouri State | No. 22 | Arrowhead Stadium; Kansas City, MO | L 17–42 | 15,349 |
| October 8 | 1:00 p.m. | Nebraska–Kearney | | Audrey J. Walton Stadium; Warrensburg, MO | W 36–16 | 6,637 |
| October 15 | 6:00 p.m. | at Missouri Southern | | Fred G. Hughes Stadium; Joplin, MO | W 56–7 | 2,526 |
| October 22 | 1:30 p.m. | Washburn | | Audrey J. Walton Stadium; Warrensburg, MO | W 29–27 | 9,138 |
| October 29 | 1:00 p.m. | Central Oklahoma | | Audrey J. Walton Stadium; Warrensburg, MO | W 48–28 | 3,895 |
| November 5 | 2:00 p.m. | at Northeastern State | No. 25 | Doc Wadley Stadium; Tahlequah, OK | W 59–21 | 3,250 |
| November 12 | 1:00 p.m. | Lindenwood | No. 24 | Audrey J. Walton Stadium; Warrensburg, MO | W 35–7 | 3,673 |
| November 19 | 1:00 p.m. | at No. 5 Harding* | No. 20 | First Security Stadium; Searcy, AR (NCAA Division II First Round) | L 31–48 | 2,107 |
*Non-conference game; Rankings from AFCA Poll released prior to the game; All times are in Central time

== Game summaries ==
=== Pittsburg State ===
Central Missouri at Pittsburg State

| Team | 1 | 2 | 3 | 4 | Total |
|---|---|---|---|---|---|
| • #20 Central Missouri | 0 | 7 | 20 | 7 | 34 |
| Pittsburg State | 10 | 3 | 0 | 14 | 27 |

- Date: September 1
- Location: Smith Stadium, Pittsburg, KS
- Game start: 7:00 pm CDT
- Elapsed time: 3:07
- Game attendance: 9,311
- Game weather: Clear, 72 °F (22 °C)
- Referee: Dwight Neibling

=== Fort Hays State ===
Fort Hays State at Central Missouri

| Team | 1 | 2 | 3 | 4 | Total |
|---|---|---|---|---|---|
| Fort Hays State | 0 | 7 | 0 | 10 | 17 |
| • #16 Central Missouri | 14 | 3 | 14 | 3 | 34 |

- Date: September 8
- Location: Walton Stadium, Warrensburg, MO
- Game start: 7:00 pm CDT
- Elapsed time: 2:51
- Game attendance: 7,279
- Game weather: Cloudy, 78 °F (26 °C)
- Referee: Danny Harris

=== Missouri Western ===
Central Missouri at Missouri Western

| Team | 1 | 2 | 3 | 4 | Total |
|---|---|---|---|---|---|
| • #14 Central Missouri | 14 | 10 | 7 | 7 | 38 |
| Missouri Western | 10 | 7 | 10 | 7 | 34 |

- Date: September 17
- Location: Spratt Stadium, St. Joseph, MO
- Game start: 6:00 pm CDT
- Elapsed time: 3:00
- Game attendance: 6,533
- Game weather: Sunny, 79 °F (26 °C)
- Referee: Craig Helser

=== Emporia State ===
Emporia State at Central Missouri

| Team | 1 | 2 | 3 | 4 | OT | 2OT | Total |
|---|---|---|---|---|---|---|---|
| • Emporia State | 7 | 3 | 7 | 7 | 7 | 6 | 37 |
| #13 Central Missouri | 0 | 7 | 0 | 17 | 7 | 0 | 31 |

- Date: September 24
- Location: Walton Stadium, Warrensburg, MO
- Game start: 1:00 pm CDT
- Elapsed time: 3:40
- Game attendance: 7,995
- Game weather: Sunny, 80 °F (27 °C)
- Referee: John Steiger

=== Northwest Missouri State ===
Central Missouri at Northwest Missouri State

| Team | 1 | 2 | 3 | 4 | Total |
|---|---|---|---|---|---|
| #22 Central Missouri | 7 | 7 | 0 | 3 | 17 |
| • #1 Northwest Missouri State | 7 | 14 | 7 | 14 | 42 |

- Date: October 1
- Location: Arrowhead Stadium, Kansas City, MO
- Game start: 5:00 pm CDT
- Elapsed time: 2:49
- Game attendance: 15,349
- Game weather: Cloudy, 70 °F (21 °C)
- Referee: Dwight Neibling

=== Nebraska–Kearney ===
Nebraska–Kearney at Central Missouri

| Team | 1 | 2 | 3 | 4 | Total |
|---|---|---|---|---|---|
| Nebraska–Kearney | 0 | 6 | 3 | 7 | 16 |
| • Central Missouri | 7 | 20 | 9 | 0 | 36 |

- Date: October 8
- Location: Walton Stadium, Warrensburg, MO
- Game start: 1:00 pm CDT
- Elapsed time: 2:54
- Game attendance: 6,637
- Game weather: Sunny, 60 °F (16 °C)
- Referee: Brian Moore

=== Missouri Southern ===
Central Missouri at Missouri Southern

| Team | 1 | 2 | 3 | 4 | Total |
|---|---|---|---|---|---|
| • Central Missouri | 14 | 28 | 7 | 7 | 56 |
| Missouri Southern | 7 | 0 | 0 | 0 | 7 |

- Date: October 15
- Location: Hughes Stadium, Joplin, MO
- Game start: 6:00 pm CDT
- Elapsed time: 2:52
- Game attendance: 2,526
- Game weather: Partly Cloudy, 77 °F (25 °C)
- Referee: Craig Helser

=== Washburn ===
Washburn at Central Missouri

| Team | 1 | 2 | 3 | 4 | Total |
|---|---|---|---|---|---|
| Washburn | 3 | 17 | 0 | 7 | 27 |
| • Central Missouri | 13 | 13 | 0 | 3 | 29 |

- Date: October 22
- Location: Walton Stadium, Warrensburg, MO
- Game start: 1:30 pm CDT
- Elapsed time: 3:10
- Game attendance: 9,138
- Game weather: Clear, 65 °F (18 °C)
- Referee: Lonnie Brickman

=== Central Oklahoma ===
Central Oklahoma at Central Missouri

| Team | 1 | 2 | 3 | 4 | Total |
|---|---|---|---|---|---|
| Central Oklahoma | 14 | 0 | 7 | 7 | 28 |
| • Central Missouri | 0 | 13 | 21 | 14 | 48 |

- Date: October 29
- Location: Walton Stadium, Warrensburg, MO
- Game start: 1:00 pm CDT
- Elapsed time: 3:07
- Game attendance: 3,895
- Game weather: Sunny, 70 °F (21 °C)
- Referee: John Steiger

=== Northeastern State ===
Central Missouri at Northeastern State

| Team | 1 | 2 | 3 | 4 | Total |
|---|---|---|---|---|---|
| • #25 Central Missouri | 21 | 10 | 14 | 14 | 59 |
| Northeastern State | 0 | 0 | 7 | 14 | 21 |

- Date: November 5
- Location: Wadley Stadium, Tahlequah, OK
- Game start: 2:00 pm CDT
- Elapsed time: 2:50
- Game attendance: 3,250
- Game weather: Sunny, 70 °F (21 °C)
- Referee: John Adams

=== Lindenwood ===
Lindenwood at Central Missouri

| Team | 1 | 2 | 3 | 4 | Total |
|---|---|---|---|---|---|
| Lindenwood | 0 | 0 | 0 | 7 | 7 |
| • #24 Central Missouri | 0 | 14 | 7 | 14 | 35 |

- Date: November 12
- Location: Walton Stadium, Warrensburg, MO
- Game start: 1:00 pm CST
- Elapsed time: 2:52
- Game attendance: 3,673
- Game weather: Sunny, 50 °F (10 °C)
- Referee: Danny Harris

=== Harding—NCAA Division II First Round ===
Central Missouri at Harding

| Team | 1 | 2 | 3 | 4 | Total |
|---|---|---|---|---|---|
| #20 Central Missouri | 14 | 10 | 7 | 0 | 31 |
| • #5 Harding | 7 | 21 | 13 | 7 | 48 |

- Date: November 19
- Location: First Security Stadium, Searcy, AR
- Game start: 1:00 pm CST
- Elapsed time: 2:39
- Game attendance: 2,107
- Game weather: Sunny, 53 °F (12 °C)
- Referee: Joe Horn

== Personnel ==
=== Coaching staff ===
Along with Svoboda, there are 13 assistants.

| Name | Position | Seasons at UCM | Alma Mater |
|---|---|---|---|
| Jim Svoboda | Head coach | 7 | Northwestern (IA) (1992) |
| John McMenamin | Assistant Football Coach – Offensive Coordinator | 2 | Northwest Missouri State (2003) |
| Wes Bell | Assistant Football Coach – Defensive Coordinator | 1 | Emporia State (2003) |
| Chuck Clemens | Assistant Football Coach – Defensive Line | 18 | Truman (1988) |
| Hank McClung | Assistant Football Coach – Offensive Line | 7 | Eastern New Mexico (1986) |
| Kyle Westphal | Assistant Football Coach – Defensive Backs / Special Teams Coordinator | 5 | Simpson College (2005) |
| Sean Teter | Strength & Conditioning Coordinator | 4 | Kansas (2010) |
| Eric Eisenberg | Graduate Assistant – Linebackers | 2 | Central Florida (2014) |
| Trey Jackson | Graduate Assistant – Offensive Line | 1 | Central Missouri (2016) |
| Ian Toalson | Graduate Assistant – Tight Ends | 1 | Central Missouri (2016) |
| Ramond Hunter | Graduate Assistant – Defensive Line | 2 | Central Missouri (2015) |
| Jerry McNeal | Graduate Assistant – Football Operations | 2 | Missouri State (2014) |
| Brody Rohach | Graduate Assistant – Running Backs | 2 | Wayne State (2015) |
| Damon Paul | Volunteer Assistant – Wide Receivers | 5 | Northwest Missouri State (1984) |

=== Roster ===
2016 Central Missouri Mules football team roster
Players
Coaches
Offense

| Pos. | # | Name | Class |
|---|---|---|---|
| WR | 1 | Jaylen Zachery | Jr |
| QB | 2 | Brook Bolles | So |
| WR | 4 | Alex Strong | Sr |
| WR | 5 | Andrew Bakker | Sr |
| TE | 7 | Justus McMullen | Jr |
| QB | 10 | Garrett Fugate | Sr |
| QB | 11 | Eric Siebenshuh | Jr |
| QB | 12 | Brendon Zachery | Fr |
| QB | 14 | Kyle Bradley | Fr |
| WR | 15 | Wesley Thomas | Jr |
| WR | 16 | Tyler Jones | Sr |
| WR | 19 | Kyle Echols | Jr |
| RB | 21 | Gabe Vandiver | Sr |
| RB | 23 | Spencer Stein | Sr |
| RB | 24 | Xavier Washpun | Jr |
| RB | 29 | Steven Ford | Fr |
| RB | 30 | Marquel McNac | Jr |
| RB | 32 | Devante Turner | Fr |
| WR | 38 | Franklin Hunt | Fr |
| TE | 48 | Zach Davidson | Fr |
| OL | 53 | Graham Baucom | Fr |
| OL | 54 | Chris Gomez | Jr |
| OL | 55 | Derrick Puni | Jr |
| OL | 59 | Nate Farnsworth | Fr |
| OL | 60 | Jake Heckler | Fr |
| OL | 61 | Terrence Pryor | Fr |
| OL | 63 | Brian Timmons | Fr |
| OL | 66 | Jesse Brookus, Jr. | Fr |
| OL | 67 | Dylan Scheirich | Fr |
| OL | 68 | Connor Hill | Fr |
| OL | 70 | Jamar Grant | Fr |
| OL | 71 | Kane Barker | Jr |
| OL | 72 | Layne Fischer | Jr |
| OL | 73 | Michael Hicks | Fr |
| OL | 74 | Markus Zimmerman | So |
| OL | 76 | Cal Hegman | Fr |
| OL | 77 | Drew Oberle | Fr |
| OL | 78 | Nick Warren | So |
| WR | 80 | Tyus Franks | Fr |
| TE | 82 | Charles Smith | So |
| WR | 83 | Udell Hyde | So |
| WR | 84 | Jovante Siglar | Jr |
| TE | 85 | Seth Herbert | So |
| WR | 86 | Hunter Allee | Fr |
| TE | 87 | Tyler Nugent | Jr |
| TE | 88 | Grant Bengtson | So |
| TE | 93 | Brice Renner | Fr |
| TE | 94 | Adam Bax | Fr |

Defense

| Pos. | # | Name | Class |
|---|---|---|---|
| DB | 3 | Tavion Vaughn | Sr |
| DB | 6 | Tevin Teamer | Jr |
| DB | 8 | Diaron Rhodes | Jr |
| LB | 9 | J.R. Alexander | Sr |
| DB | 13 | Blake Cooper | Fr |
| DB | 17 | Jordan Conaty | Jr |
| DB | 18 | Justin Biermann | So |
| LB | 22 | Mark Cushing | Jr |
| LB | 25 | Marques Cooper | Fr |
| DB | 26 | Monteze Latimore | Jr |
| DB | 27 | Jordan Dickson | So |
| DB | 28 | Brian Smith | Sr |
| DB | 31 | Tanner Kanak | So |
| DB | 33 | Jontrell Mitchell | Fr |
| DB | 35 | Dylan Albertson | So |
| LB | 37 | Ezra Boyd | So |
| LB | 39 | Alex Lackey | Jr |
| LB | 40 | John Embrey | Fr |
| LB | 41 | Jack Crown | Sr |
| DB | 42 | Jackson Newman | So |
| LB | 43 | Tyson Holcombe | Jr |
| DL | 44 | Connor Flagel | Jr |
| DB | 45 | James Willis | So |
| LB | 49 | Austin Miller | Jr |
| LB | 51 | Rick Pesek | So |
| LB | 52 | Kenny Jacobs | Jr |
| LB | 56 | Michael Tannehill | So |
| LB | 57 | Amel Cofield | So |
| DE | 58 | Tony Casados | Jr |
| DL | 62 | Ubong Udom | Fr |
| DL | 64 | Dalainey Taala | So |
| DB | 81 | Kareem Sanders | Fr |
| DL | 90 | Triphinue Taylor | Fr |
| DE | 91 | Jordan Hardwick | Fr |
| DL | 92 | Tony Leachman | Fr |
| DL | 96 | Irana Moore | Fr |
| DL | 97 | Josh Powell | Fr |
| DL | 98 | Wyatt Hendrix | Fr |
| DL | 99 | Dalen Winston | Fr |

Special teams

| Pos. | # | Name | Class |
|---|---|---|---|
| K/P | 34 | Logan Offner | Fr |
| LS | 46 | Garrett Cline | Jr |
| K | 47 | Billy Greco | So |
| K | 69 | Jordan McFarlen | So |
| P | 95 | Ryan Tanner | Sr |

Head coach

- Jim Svoboda

Coordinators/assistant coaches

- See coaching staff

Legend

- (C) Team captain
- (S) Suspended
- (I) Ineligible
- Injured
- Redshirt

Roster
Last update: 2016-08-12
