= 1925 South Dakota Coyotes football team =

American college football season

1925 South Dakota Coyotes football
- Conference: North Central Conference
- Record: 3–5 (1–4 NCC)
- Head coach: Stub Allison (4th season)
- Home stadium: Inman Field

1925 North Central Conference football standings
	Conf.					Overall
Team	W		L		T	W		L		T
Nebraska Wesleyan +	3	–	0	–	1	6	–	0	–	2
Creighton +	3	–	0	–	1	6	–	3	–	1
North Dakota Agricultural +	4	–	0	–	2	5	–	0	–	2
North Dakota	2	–	2	–	0	4	–	4	–	0
South Dakota State	1	–	1	–	2	2	–	3	–	2
Morningside	2	–	4	–	0	3	–	5	–	0
South Dakota	1	–	4	–	0	3	–	5	–	0
Des Moines	0	–	4	–	0	0	–	7	–	1
+ – Conference co-champions

The 1925 South Dakota Coyotes football team was an American football team that represented the University of South Dakota in the North Central Conference (NCC) during the 1925 college football season. In its fourth season under head coach Stub Allison, the team compiled a 3–5 record (1–4 against NCC opponents) and outscored opponents by a total of 93 to 39. The team played its home games at Inman Field in Vermillion, South Dakota.

South Dakota tackle Malone was selected as a first-team player on the 1925 All-North Central Conference football team.

== Schedule ==
Date	Opponent	Site	Result	Attendance	Source
September 26	Yankton*	Inman Field; Vermillion, SD	W 45–0		
October 2	at Northwestern*	Dyche Stadium; Evanston, IL	L 7–14	18,000	
October 10	Dakota Wesleyan*	Inman Field; Vermillion, SD	W 27–0		
October 17	at North Dakota	Grand Forks, ND	L 0–3		
October 24	Nebraska Wesleyan	Inman Field; Vermillion, SD	L 0–3		
October 31	South Dakota State^{†}	Inman Field; Vermillion, SD	L 0–7		
November 14	Des Moines	Inman Field; Vermillion, SD	W 7–0		
November 26	at Morningside	Bass Field; Sioux City, IA	L 7–12	7,000	
*Non-conference game; ^{†}Homecoming
