= 1925 North Dakota Agricultural Bison football team =

American college football season

1925 North Dakota Agricultural Bison football

NCC co-champion
- Conference: North Central Conference
- Record: 5–0–2 (4–0–2 NCC)
- Head coach: Ion Cortright (1st season)
- Captain: Wallace Thompson
- Home stadium: Dacotah Field

1925 North Central Conference football standings
	Conf.					Overall
Team	W		L		T	W		L		T
Nebraska Wesleyan +	3	–	0	–	1	6	–	0	–	2
Creighton +	3	–	0	–	1	6	–	3	–	1
North Dakota Agricultural +	4	–	0	–	2	5	–	0	–	2
North Dakota	2	–	2	–	0	4	–	4	–	0
South Dakota State	1	–	1	–	2	2	–	3	–	2
Morningside	2	–	4	–	0	3	–	5	–	0
South Dakota	1	–	4	–	0	3	–	5	–	0
Des Moines	0	–	4	–	0	0	–	7	–	1
+ – Conference co-champions

The 1925 North Dakota Agricultural Bison football team was an American football team that represented North Dakota Agricultural College (now known as North Dakota State University) in the North Central Conference (NCC) during the 1925 college football season. In its first season under head coach Ion Cortright, the team compiled a 5–0–2 record (4–0–2 against NCC opponents) and tied for the NCC championship.

== Schedule ==
Date	Opponent	Site	Result	Attendance	Source
September 26	Jamestown*	Fargo, ND	W 47–0		
October 3	at Creighton	Omaha, NE	T 0–0	3,000	
October 10	Morningside	Fargo, ND	W 14–7		
October 17	South Dakota State	Fargo, ND (rivalry)	T 3–3		
October 24	at Des Moines	Highland Field; Des Moines, IA	W 14–6	2,000	
October 31	at North Dakota	Grand Forks, ND (rivalry)	W 19–10		
November 11	at St. Thomas (MN)*	Cadet Field; Saint Paul, MN	W 14–7		
*Non-conference game
