= Weldon Gentry =

American football player (1906–1990)

- Gentry in 1930

Profile
- Position: Guard

Personal information
- Born: September 9, 1906; Lawton, Oklahoma Indian Territory, U.S.
- Died: March 19, 1990 (aged 83); Oklahoma City, Oklahoma, U.S.
- Listed height: 5 ft 10 in (1.78 m)
- Listed weight: 195 lb (88 kg)

Career information
- High school: Lawton (OK)
- College: Arkansas, Oklahoma

Career history
- Providence Steam Roller (1930-1931)

Awards and highlights
- Second-team All-Big Six (1929)
- Stats at Pro Football Reference

Weldon Christopher "Spot" Gentry (September 9, 1906 – March 19, 1990) was an American football player. He played college football for the Arkansas Razorbacks and Oklahoma Sooners and professional football for the Providence Steam Roller and Philadelphia Eagles.

== Early life ==
Gentry was born in 1906 near Lawton, then in the Oklahoma Indian Territory. He attended Lawton High School. He played college football for Arkansas in 1925 and 1926 and for Oklahoma from 1927 to 1929. He was selected to the 1929 All-Big Six football team.

== Professional career ==
He then played professional football in the National Football League (NFL) as a guard for the Providence Steam Roller during the 1930 and 1931 seasons. He appeared in 11 NFL games. He also played for the Philadelphia Eagles.

== Later life ==
After his playing career ended, Gentry founded the Oklahoma City Chiefs professional football team. He was an assistant football coach at Oklahoma for a time. He later worked for the Oklahoma Highway Patrol and later still for the Federal Bureau of Investigation, focusing on bank robbery cases. He died in 1990 in Oklahoma City.
