= Jim Svoboda =

American football player and coach (born 1960)

Biographical details
- Born: June 23, 1960 (age 66); Honolulu, Hawaii, U.S.
- Education: Northwestern College

Coaching career (HC unless noted)
- 1983: Northwestern (IA) (RB)
- 1984: Dana (RB)
- 1985: Eastern New Mexico (RB)
- 1986: Nebraska Wesleyan (RB)
- 1987–1993: Nebraska Wesleyan
- 1994–2003: Northwest Missouri State (OC/QB)
- 2004–2006: UCLA (OC/QB)
- 2007–2009: Montana State (QB)
- 2010–2021: Central Missouri
- 2022: Tulane (OC/QB)

Head coaching record
- Overall: 137–62
- Bowls: 2–1
- Tournaments: 0–3 (NAIA D-II playoffs); 3–3 (NCAA D-II playoffs)

Accomplishments and honors

Championships
- 3 NIAC (1988–1990); 1 MIAA (2019)

Jim Svoboda (born June 23, 1960) is an American football coach and former player. He most recently served as the quarterbacks coach at Tulane for the 2022 season, where the team went 12–2 and won the Cotton Bowl Classic. Svoboda served as the head football coach at Nebraska Wesleyan University (NWU) from 1987 to 1993 and the University of Central Missouri in Warrensburg, Missouri from 2010 to 2021. While at Nebraska Wesleyan, Svoboda won three Great Plains Athletic Conference championships (1988–1990), and advanced to the NAIA playoffs three times between 1988 and 1991. After coaching at NWU, Svoboda was the offensive coordinator at Northwest Missouri State University for 10 seasons, three of which the team won the NCAA Division II Football Championship. While serving as the offensive coordinator and quarterbacks coach at UCLA, Svoboda was a 2005 finalist for the Broyles Award, given annually to the nation's top college football assistant coach.

== Head coaching record ==
Year	Coach	Overall	Conference	Standing	Bowl/playoffs
Nebraska Wesleyan Plainsmen (Nebraska Intercollegiate Athletic Conference / Nebraska-Iowa Athletic Conference) (1987–1993)
1987	Nebraska Wesleyan	6–4	3–2	T–2nd	
1988	Nebraska Wesleyan	8–2	5–0	1st	L NAIA Division II First Round
1989	Nebraska Wesleyan	10–2	5–0	1st	L NAIA Division II Second Round
1990	Nebraska Wesleyan	7–2	4–1	T–1st	
1991	Nebraska Wesleyan	8–3	4–1	2nd	L NAIA Division II First Round
1992	Nebraska Wesleyan	6–3	4–2	3rd	
1993	Nebraska Wesleyan	7–3	4–2	3rd	
Nebraska Wesleyan:		52–19	29–8		
Central Missouri Mules (Mid-America Intercollegiate Athletics Association) (2010–present)
2010	Central Missouri	11–3	8–1	2nd	L NCAA Division II Quarterfinal
2011	Central Missouri	8–4	6–3	5th	L Kanza
2012	Central Missouri	6–4	6–4	7th	
2013	Central Missouri	6–4	5–4	7th	
2014	Central Missouri	8–4	7–4	4th	W Live United Texarkana
2015	Central Missouri	8–3	8–3	T–3rd	
2016	Central Missouri	9–3	9–2	3rd	L NCAA Division II First Round
2017	Central Missouri	9–3	8–3	3rd	W Mineral Water
2018	Central Missouri	5–6	5–6	T–4th	
2019	Central Missouri	11–2	10–1	T–1st	L NCAA Division II Second Round
2020–21	No team—COVID-19				
2021	Central Missouri	4–7	4–7	T–8th	
Central Missouri:		86–43	76–38		
Total:		137–62			
National championship Conference title Conference division title or championship game berth
