= 1925 Nebraska Wesleyan Coyotes football team =

American college football season

1925 Nebraska Wesleyan Coyotes football

NCC co-champion
- Conference: North Central Conference
- Record: 6–0–2 (3–0–1 NCC)
- Head coach: Clarence L. Dow (1st season)
- Home stadium: Johnson Field

1925 North Central Conference football standings
	Conf.					Overall
Team	W		L		T	W		L		T
Nebraska Wesleyan +	3	–	0	–	1	6	–	0	–	2
Creighton +	3	–	0	–	1	6	–	3	–	1
North Dakota Agricultural +	4	–	0	–	2	5	–	0	–	2
North Dakota	2	–	2	–	0	4	–	4	–	0
South Dakota State	1	–	1	–	2	2	–	3	–	2
Morningside	2	–	4	–	0	3	–	5	–	0
South Dakota	1	–	4	–	0	3	–	5	–	0
Des Moines	0	–	4	–	0	0	–	7	–	1
+ – Conference co-champions

The 1925 Nebraska Wesleyan Coyotes football team was an American football team that represented Nebraska Wesleyan University as a member of the North Central Conference (NCC) during the 1925 college football season. In its first season under head coach Clarence L. Dow, the team compiled a 6–0–2 record (3–0–1 against NCC opponents), shut out seven of eight opponents, did not allow its goal line to be crossed, and outscored all opponents by a total of 76 to 3. The team played its home games at Johnson Field in Lincoln, Nebraska.

Fullback Oscar Wiberg was the team captain. Wiberg and tackle Huyck were selected as first-team players on the 1925 All-North Central Conference football team.

== Schedule ==
Date	Opponent	Site	Result	Source
October 3	Simpson (IA)*	Johnson Field; Lincoln, NE	T 0–0	
October 10	at South Dakota State	Brookings, SD	T 3–3	
October 16	Midland*	Johnson Field; Lincoln, NE	W 10–0	
October 24	at South Dakota	Inman Field; Vermillion, SD	W 3–0	
October 30	at St. Thomas (MN)*	Cadet Field; Saint Paul, MN	W 10–0	
November 7	Morningside^{†}	Johnson Field; Lincoln, NE	W 7–0	
November 14	at Hastings*	Hastings, NE	W 17–0	
November 23	Des Moines	Johnson Field; Lincoln, NE	W 26–0	
*Non-conference game; ^{†}Homecoming
