= 1925 Creighton Bluejays football team =

American college football season

1925 Creighton Bluejays football

NCC co-champion
- Conference: North Central Conference
- Record: 6–3–1 (3–0–1 NCC)
- Head coach: Chet A. Wynne (3rd season)
- Home stadium: Creighton Stadium

1925 North Central Conference football standings
	Conf.					Overall
Team	W		L		T	W		L		T
Nebraska Wesleyan +	3	–	0	–	1	6	–	0	–	2
Creighton +	3	–	0	–	1	6	–	3	–	1
North Dakota Agricultural +	4	–	0	–	2	5	–	0	–	2
North Dakota	2	–	2	–	0	4	–	4	–	0
South Dakota State	1	–	1	–	2	2	–	3	–	2
Morningside	2	–	4	–	0	3	–	5	–	0
South Dakota	1	–	4	–	0	3	–	5	–	0
Des Moines	0	–	4	–	0	0	–	7	–	1
+ – Conference co-champions

The 1925 Creighton Bluejays football team was an American football team that represented Creighton University as a member of the North Central Conference during the 1925 college football season. In its third season under head coach Chet A. Wynne, the team compiled a 6–3–1 record and outscored opponents by a total of 103 to 46. The team played its home games at Creighton Stadium in Omaha, Nebraska.

Three Creighton players were selected as first-team players on the 1925 All-North Central Conference football team: Hickey at quarterback; Keane at halfback; and Lang at end.

== Schedule ==
Date	Opponent	Site	Result	Attendance	Source
September 26	at Midland*	Fremont, NE	W 33–6		
October 3	North Dakota Agricultural	Omaha, NE	T 0–0	3,000	
October 7	Colorado*	Creighton Stadium; Omaha, NE	L 6–14		
October 17	at Morningside	Bass Field; Sioux City, IA	W 20–6		
October 24	at South Dakota State	Brookings, SD	W 19–0		
October 31	at Marquette*	Marquette Stadium; Milwaukee, WI	L 0–28		
November 7	at John Carroll*	Cleveland, OH	W 30–6		
November 14	North Dakota	Creighton Stadium; Omaha, NE	W 20–7	7,000	
November 21	Haskell*	Creighton Stadium; Omaha, NE	L 7–16		
November 26	Idaho*	Creighton Stadium; Omaha, NE	W 34–19		
*Non-conference game
