= 1936 Middlebury Panthers football team =

American college football season

1936 Middlebury Panthers football

Vermont champion
- Conference: Independent
- Record: 8–0
- Head coach: Ben Beck (9th season)
- Captain: William Craig
- Home stadium: Porter Field

1936 Eastern college football independents records
	Conf.			Overall
Team	W	L	T	W		L		T
Middlebury		–		8	–	0	–	0
Saint Anselm		–		6	–	0	–	1
No. 3 Pittsburgh		–		8	–	1	–	1
No. 10 Penn		–		7	–	1	–	0
No. 12 Yale		–		7	–	1	–	0
No. 13 Dartmouth		–		7	–	1	–	1
Franklin & Marshall		–		7	–	1	–	1
No. 14 Duquesne		–		8	–	2	–	0
Boston College		–		6	–	1	–	2
Boston University		–		5	–	1	–	2
No. 15 Fordham		–		5	–	1	–	2
Holy Cross		–		7	–	2	–	1
Villanova		–		7	–	2	–	1
Army		–		6	–	3	–	0
Colgate		–		6	–	3	–	0
Drexel		–		6	–	3	–	0
Temple		–		6	–	3	–	2
La Salle		–		6	–	3	–	1
Buffalo		–		5	–	3	–	0
Columbia		–		5	–	3	–	0
Princeton		–		4	–	2	–	2
Saint Vincent		–		5	–	3	–	0
NYU		–		5	–	3	–	1
Manhattan		–		6	–	4	–	0
Northeastern		–		5	–	4	–	0
Bucknell		–		4	–	4	–	1
CCNY		–		4	–	4	–	0
Tufts		–		3	–	3	–	1
Harvard		–		3	–	4	–	1
Cornell		–		3	–	5	–	0
Penn State		–		3	–	5	–	0
Westminster (PA)		–		2	–	4	–	1
Brown		–		3	–	7	–	0
Carnegie Tech		–		2	–	6	–	0
Massachusetts State		–		2	–	6	–	0
Providence		–		1	–	7	–	0
Syracuse		–		1	–	7	–	0
Vermont		–		1	–	8	–	0
Rankings from AP Poll

The 1936 Middlebury Panthers football team was an American football team that represented Middlebury College as an independent during the 1936 college football season. In their ninth year under head coach Ben Beck, the Panthers compiled a perfect 8–0 record, shut out five of eight opponents, and outscored all opponents by a total of 117 to 21. Middlebury's 1936 season was the first undefeated season in Middlebury's football history.

Sophomore end John Kirk scored 30 points and received All-America honors from the Christy Walsh newspaper syndicate.

In 1986, Middlebury celebrated the 50th anniversary of the 1936 team, and it was cited as "one of the nation's all-time finest, small college defensive teams."

The team played its home games at Porter Field in Middlebury, Vermont.

== Schedule ==
Date	Opponent	Site	Result	Source
September 27	at Union (NY)	Schenecatady, NY	W 7–0	
October 3	at Colby	Seavern's Field; Waterville, ME	W 6–0	
October 10	Coast Guard	Power Field; Middlebury, VT	W 12–0	
October 17	at RPI	Troy, NY	W 13–0	
October 24	at Norwich	Northfield, VT	W 13–6	
October 31	St. Lawrence	Porter Field; Middlebury, VT	W 19–8	
November 7	Ithaca	Porter Field; Middlebury, VT	W 27–7	
November 14	Vermont	Porter Field; Middlebury, VT	W 20–0	

== Players ==
- George Anderson, junior, guard,
- Robert Boehm, junior, back, 147 pounds, 5'9"
- Frank W. Casey, sophomore, tackle, 190 pounds, 5'9"
- John Chalmers, junior, quarterback, 143 pounds, 5'9"
- William G. Craig, senior, end and captain, 168 pounds, 5'9"
- John E. Cridland, junior, tackle, 196 pounds, 6'2"
- George Farrell, junior, quarterback, 148 pounds, 5'7"
- John Golembeske, sophomore, center, 160 pounds, 5'8"
- Paul B. Guarnaccia, junior, back, 185 pounds, 5'11"
- Randall W. Hoffman, senior, guard, 171 pounds, 5'11"
- Kenneth M. Kinsey, sophomore, tackle, 202 pounds, 5'10"
- John Kirk, sophomore, end, 165 pounds, 5'10"
- Cecil Liljenstein, junior, back, 157 pounds, 5'8"
- John Lonergan, senior, back, 150 pounds, 5'8"
- E. Sherburne Lovell, junior, center, 170 pounds, 5'9"
- Kenneth G. MacLeod, junior, end, 170 pounds, 5'11"
- Donald R. Meserve, sophomore, guard, 170 pounds, 5'8"
- Thomas N. Murray, sophomore, tackle, 200 pounds, 5'0"
- Conrad Philipson, senior, back, 160 pounds, 5'9"
- Albert J. Riccio, junior, end, 166 pounds, 5'7"
- Warren Rohrer, sophomore, center, 165 pounds, 5'10"
- John Seixas, senior, tackle, 215 pounds, 5'10"
- Raymond J. Skinner, sophomore, guard, 160 pounds, 5'9"
- John S. Van Doren, sophomore, back, 168 pounds, 5'11"
- John R. Williams, junior, back, 150 pounds, 5'8"
- Field H. Winslow, junior, end, 178 pounds, 6'4"
