= 2016 Northwest Missouri State Bearcats football team =

American college football season

2016 Northwest Missouri State Bearcats football

NCAA Division II champion MIAA champion

NCAA Division II Championship Game, W 29–3 vs. North Alabama
- Conference: Mid-America Intercollegiate Athletics Association

Ranking
- AFCA: No. 1
- Record: 15–0 (11–0 MIAA)
- Head coach: Adam Dorrel (6th season)
- Offensive coordinator: Charlie Flohr (5th season)
- Offensive scheme: Pro spread
- Defensive coordinator: Rich Wright (6th season)
- Base defense: 4–2–5
- Home stadium: Bearcat Stadium

2016 Mid-America Intercollegiate Athletics Association football standings
	Conf.			Overall
Team	W		L	W		L
No. 1 NW Missouri State $^	11	–	0	15	–	0
No. 10 Emporia State ^	10	–	1	11	–	2
No. 21 Central Missouri ^	9	–	2	9	–	3
Fort Hays State #	7	–	4	8	–	4
Pittsburg State	7	–	4	7	–	4
Washburn #	7	–	4	7	–	5
Missouri Western	4	–	7	4	–	7
Central Oklahoma	3	–	8	3	–	8
Lindenwood	3	–	8	3	–	8
Missouri Southern	2	–	9	2	–	9
Northeastern State	2	–	9	2	–	9
Nebraska–Kearney	1	–	10	1	–	10
$ – Conference champion; ^ – NCAA Division II playoff participant; # – bowl participant (Wahsburn: Mineral Water Bowl, Fort Hays State: C.H.A.M.P.S. Heart of Texas Bowl; Rankings from AFCA poll)

The 2016 Northwest Missouri State Bearcats football team represented Northwest Missouri State University as a member of the Mid-America Intercollegiate Athletics Association (MIAA) during the 2016 NCAA Division II football season. Led by sixth-year head coach Adam Dorrel, the Bearcats compiled an overall record of 15–0 with a mark of 11–0 in conference play, winning the MIAA title. They won the program's sixth NCAA Division II Football Championship with a win over North Alabama in the NCAA Division II Championship Game.

The Bearcats played their home games on the newly-renovated Bearcat Stadium in Maryville, Missouri. 2016 was the 100th season in school history.

== Schedule ==
Date	Time	Opponent	Rank	Site	TV	Result	Attendance
September 1	7:00 p.m.	at No. 24 Emporia State	No. 1	Francis G. Welch Stadium; Emporia, KS		W 41–14	6,821
September 8	7:00 p.m.	Washburn	No. 1	Bearcat Stadium; Maryville, MO		W 41–7	7,501
September 17	1:30 p.m.	Nebraska–Kearney	No. 1	Bearcat Stadium; Maryville, MO		W 52–14	8,550
September 24	6:00 p.m.	at Missouri Southern	No. 1	Fred G. Hughes Stadium; Joplin, MO		W 45–21	5,267
October 1	5:00 p.m.	No. 22 Central Missouri	No. 1	Arrowhead Stadium; Kansas City, MO		W 42–17	15,349
October 8	2:00 p.m.	at Central Oklahoma	No. 1	Wantland Stadium; Edmond, OK		W 56–10	3,109
October 15	1:30 p.m.	Northeastern State	No. 1	Bearcat Stadium; Maryville, MO		W 74–29	7,296
October 22	1:30 p.m.	at Lindenwood	No. 1	Harlen C. Hunter Stadium; St. Charles, MO		W 47–12	3,527
October 29	2:30 p.m.	Pittsburg State^{†}	No. 1	Bearcat Stadium; Maryville, MO (rivalry)	ASN	W 69–10	10,283
November 5	2:00 p.m.	at Fort Hays State	No. 1	Lewis Field Stadium; Hays, KS		W 28–7	3,325
November 12	1:30 p.m.	Missouri Western	No. 1	Bearcat Stadium; Maryville, MO (rivalry)		W 44–3	7,542
November 26	1:00 p.m.	No. 9 Emporia State*	No. 1	Bearcat Stadium; Maryville, MO (NCAA Division II Second Round)		W 44–13	5,119
December 3	1:00 p.m.	No. 5 Harding*	No. 1	Bearcat Stadium; Maryville, MO (NCAA Division II Quarterfinal)		W 35–0	5,473
December 10	2:30 p.m.	No. 5 Ferris State*	No. 1	Bearcat Stadium; Maryville, MO (NCAA Division II Semifinal)		W 35–20	5,264
December 17	3:00 p.m.	No. 7 North Alabama*	No. 1	Children's Mercy Park; Kansas City, KS (NCAA Division II Championship)	ESPN2	W 29–3	9,576
*Non-conference game; ^{†}Homecoming; Rankings from American Football Coaches Association Poll released prior to the game; All times are in Central time

== Preseason ==
The Bearcats entered the 2016 season as the defending NCAA Division II National Champions, after finishing the 2015 season with a 15–0 record overall and in conference play. On August 2, 2016 at the MIAA Football Media Day, the Bearcats were chosen to finish in 1st place in both the Coaches Poll and in the Media Poll.

Sporting News released their Top-25 on May 25, 2016, landing Northwest Missouri State at #1. On June 15, 2016, Lindy's NCAA Division II Preseason Top 25 released its poll ranking Northwest Missouri State at #1.

On August 15, the American Football Coaches Association released the Preseason Division II Poll, landing Northwest Missouri State at #1.

On August 22, D2football.com released its Top 25 poll, ranking Northwest Missouri State 1st.

== Game summaries ==
=== Regular season ===
==== Emporia State ====
Northwest Missouri State at Emporia State

Team	1	2	3	4	Total
• #1 Northwest Missouri State	3	17	14	7	41
#24 Emporia State	7	0	0	7	14

- Date: September 1
- Location: Francis G. Welch Stadium, Emporia, KS
- Game start: 7:00 pm CDT
- Elapsed time: 2:59
- Game attendance: 6,821
- Game weather: Sunny, 75 °F (24 °C)
- Referee: Craig Helser

==== Washburn ====
Washburn at Northwest Missouri State

Team	1	2	3	4	Total
Washburn	0	7	0	0	7
• #1 Northwest Missouri State	17	0	14	10	41

- Date: September 8
- Location: Bearcat Stadium, Maryville, MO
- Game start: 7:00 pm CDT
- Elapsed time: 2:54
- Game attendance: 7,501
- Game weather: Overcast, 80 °F (27 °C)
- Referee: Sean Johnston

==== Nebraska–Kearney ====
Nebraska–Kearney at Northwest Missouri State

Team	1	2	3	4	Total
Nebraska–Kearney	7	0	7	0	14
• #1 Northwest Missouri State	10	28	7	7	52

- Date: September 17
- Location: Bearcat Stadium, Maryville, MO
- Game start: 1:30 pm CDT
- Elapsed time: 3:01
- Game attendance: 8,550
- Game weather: Sunny, 70 °F (21 °C)
- Referee: Brian Moore

==== Missouri Southern ====
Northwest Missouri State at Missouri Southern

Team	1	2	3	4	Total
• #1 Northwest Missouri State	0	28	7	10	45
Missouri Southern	13	0	8	0	21

- Date: September 24
- Location: Fred G. Hughes Stadium, Joplin, MO
- Game start: 6:00 pm CDT
- Elapsed time: 2:58
- Game attendance: 5,267
- Game weather: Partly Cloudy, 85 °F (29 °C)
- Referee: Danny Harris

==== Central Missouri ====
Central Missouri at Northwest Missouri State

Team	1	2	3	4	Total
#22 Central Missouri	7	7	0	3	17
• #1 Northwest Missouri State	7	14	7	14	42

- Date: October 1
- Location: Arrowhead Stadium, Kansas City, MO
- Game start: 5:00 pm CDT
- Elapsed time: 2:49
- Game attendance: 15,349
- Game weather: Cloudy, 70 °F (21 °C)
- Referee: Dwight Neibling

==== Central Oklahoma ====
Northwest Missouri State at Central Oklahoma

Team	1	2	3	4	Total
• #1 Northwest Missouri State	14	28	14	0	56
Central Oklahoma	0	10	0	0	10

- Date: October 8
- Location: Wantland Stadium, Edmond, OK
- Game start: 2:00 pm CDT
- Elapsed time: 2:55
- Game attendance: 3,109
- Game weather: Sunny, 70 °F (21 °C)
- Referee: Danny Harris

==== Northeastern State ====
Northeastern State at Northwest Missouri State

Team	1	2	3	4	Total
Northeastern State	6	9	14	0	29
• #1 Northwest Missouri State	21	25	21	7	74

- Date: October 15
- Location: Bearcat Stadium, Maryville, MO
- Game start: 1:30 pm CDT
- Elapsed time: 3:07
- Game attendance: 7,296
- Game weather: Overcast, 70 °F (21 °C)
- Referee: Sean Johnston

==== Lindenwood ====
Northwest Missouri State at Lindenwood

Team	1	2	3	4	Total
• #1 Northwest Missouri State	14	17	0	16	47
Lindenwood	6	0	0	6	12

- Date: October 22
- Location: Harlen C. Hunter Stadium, St. Charles, MO
- Game start: 1:30 pm CDT
- Elapsed time: 2:54
- Game attendance: 3,527
- Game weather: Sunny, 65 °F (18 °C)
- Referee: Sean Johnston

==== Pittsburg State ====
Pittsburg State at Northwest Missouri State

Team	1	2	3	4	Total
Pittsburg State	0	3	7	0	10
• #1 Northwest Missouri State	14	27	14	14	69

- Date: October 29
- Location: Bearcat Stadium, Maryville, MO
- Game start: 2:30 pm CDT
- Elapsed time: 3:12
- Game attendance: 10,283
- Game weather: Sunny, 70 °F (21 °C)
- Referee: John Adams
- Television network: American Sports Network

==== Fort Hays State ====
Northwest Missouri State at Fort Hays State

Team	1	2	3	4	Total
• #1 Northwest Missouri State	14	0	0	14	28
Fort Hays State	0	0	0	7	7

- Date: November 5
- Location: Lewis Field Stadium, Hays, KS
- Game start: 2:00 pm CDT
- Elapsed time: 3:02
- Game attendance: 3,325
- Game weather: Partly cloudy, 67 °F (19 °C)
- Referee: Craig Helser

==== Missouri Western ====
Missouri Western at Northwest Missouri State

Team	1	2	3	4	Total
Missouri Western	0	3	0	0	3
• #1 Northwest Missouri State	10	7	10	17	44

- Date: November 12
- Location: Bearcat Stadium, Maryville, MO
- Game start: 1:30 pm CST
- Elapsed time: 2:50
- Game attendance: 7,542
- Game weather: Sunny, 50 °F (10 °C)
- Referee: Dwight Neibling

With their win over Missouri Western, the Bearcats clinched their fourth straight conference title.

=== Postseason ===
==== Emporia State ====
Emporia State at Northwest Missouri State

Team	1	2	3	4	Total
#9 Emporia State	0	13	0	0	13
• #1 Northwest Missouri State	17	14	3	10	44

- Date: November 26
- Location: Bearcat Stadium, Maryville, MO
- Game start: 1:00 pm CST
- Elapsed time: 2:50
- Game attendance: 5,119
- Game weather: Sunny and clear, 51 °F (11 °C)
- Referee: Craig Hesler

Entering postseason as the No. 1 team, the Bearcats earn a bye during the first week of playoffs and will play the winner of the Emporia State and Minnesota–Duluth game.

==== Harding ====
Harding at Northwest Missouri State

Team	1	2	3	4	Total
#5 Harding	0	0	0	0	0
• #1 Northwest Missouri State	10	12	3	10	35

- Date: December 3
- Location: Bearcat Stadium, Maryville, MO
- Game start: 1:00 pm CST
- Elapsed time: 2:22
- Game attendance: 5,473
- Game weather: Clear and cool, 40 °F (4 °C)
- Referee: Bob Rose

==== Ferris State ====
Ferris State at Northwest Missouri State

Team	1	2	3	4	Total
#15 Ferris State	0	0	0	0	0
#1 Northwest Missouri State	0	0	0	0	0

- Date: December 10
- Location: Bearcat Stadium, Maryville, MO
- Game start: 2:30 pm CST

== Personnel ==
=== Coaching staff ===
Along with Dorrel, there are 12 assistants.

Name	Position	Seasons at NWMSU	Alma Mater
Adam Dorrel	Head coach	6	Northwest Missouri State (1998)
Rich Wright	Assist. Head Coach – Defensive Coordinator	6	Dana College (1995)
Charlie Flohr	Assist. Head Coach – Offensive Coordinator	11	Dakota State (2002)
Joel Osborn	Assist. Head Coach – WR/Recruiting Coordinator	6	Northwest Missouri State (2009)
Chad Bostwick	Assist. Head Coach – Linebackers	6	Northwest Missouri State (2005)
Brandon Clayton	Assist. Head Coach – Defensive backs	2	Northwest Missouri State (2009)
Ryan Gent	Assist. Head Coach – Tight Ends/Running backs	3	Iowa State (2013)
Ross Sharp	Director of player personnel	3	Northwest Missouri State (2014)
Scott Reilly	Graduate Assistant – Offensive Line	3	Northwest Missouri State (2016)
Andrew Pitts	Graduate Assistant – Defensive Backs	1	Northwest Missouri State (2016)
Justin Mulloy	Graduate Assistant – Quarterbacks	1	Minnesota (2014)
Brock Sherman	Graduate Assistant – Defensive Line	1	Northwest Missouri State (2016)
Tucker Peve	Football Equipment Manager	4	Northwest Missouri State (2017)

=== Roster ===
2016 Northwest Missouri State Bearcats football team roster
Players
Coaches
Offense

Pos.	#	Name	Class
WR	1	Dre Washington	Sr
WR	2	Jordan Bishop	Jr
RB	7	Cameron Wilcox	Jr
WR	8	George Sehl	Sr
RB	10	Emanuel Jones	So
WR	12	Randy Schmidt	Jr
WR	13	Shawn Bane Jr.	So
QB	15	Jonathan Baker	Jr
QB	16	Kyle Zimmerman	Sr
QB	17	Zach Martin	Jr
WR	18	Sha'Corey Foster	So
WR	19	Cody Massey	So
WR	22	Haden Bryant	Jr
WR	25	Quincy Woods	Fr
RB	26	Chase White	So
RB	28	Phil Jackson II	Sr
RB	32	Jordan Grove	Jr
RB	34	Brody McMahon	Fr
QB	37	Jayden Johnson	Fr
FB	42	Clay Meinders	Fr
TE	48	Clayton Wilson	Jr
OL	53	Scott Gourley	Jr
OL	58	Chase Thomas	So
OL	59	Joey Ziegler	Fr
OL	60	Myles McIntyre	Jr
OL	62	Chase Sherman	Sr
OL	64	Kyle Meyer	Sr
OL	65	Tim Otting	Fr
OL	66	Jamie Thieman	Sr
OL	69	Max Moore	So
OL	70	Trey Kothe	So
OL	71	Anthony Enriquez	Fr
TE	72	Ryan Spelhaug	Fr
OL	74	Zach Flott	So
OL	75	Jackson Morrison	So
OL	76	Jacob Cacek	Fr
OL	77	Jonathan Ortiz	Fr
OL	78	Landon Kubicek	Jr
OL	79	Ryan Huff	Jr
WR	80	Shane Williams	Jr
TE	81	Austen Eskew	So
TE	82	Marqus Andrews	Fr
WR	83	Darby Raines	Jr
TE	85	Jordan Klingman	Fr
TE	86	Kyle Raunig	Fr
TE	90	TJ Schieber	Sr
OL		Gabe Bautz	Fr
WR		Faizol Bouchard	Fr
QB		Joe Brannan	Fr
RB		Kier Brown	Fr
OL		Austin Clarkson	Fr
WR		Kyle Dolecheck	Fr
OL		Matthew Frankenbach	Fr
OL		TyDarrius Griffin	Fr
RB		Kobe Hardin	Fr
WR		Seth Hedrick	Fr
QB		Jadyn Kowalski	Fr
WR		Grant Martin	Fr
OL		Trenton Roller	Fr
WR		Alec Tatum	Fr
OL		Kade Theobald	Fr

Defense

Pos.	#	Name	Class
S	3	Edward Richey	Jr
LB	4	Jarrod Bishop	Jr
S	5	Jack Young	Sr
S	6	Kevin Berg	Sr
CB	9	Marcus Jones	Jr
DT	11	Collin Bevins	Sr
CB	14	Chama Pierre	So
CB	20	Anthony Lane	So
CB	21	Wes Smith	Jr
S	23	Najeem Hosein	So
S	24	Trent Nally	So
CB	27	Jack Richards	So
S	29	Jake Marshall	Fr
DB	31	Joe Straws	Fr
LB	35	Breyon Dennis	So
LB	36	Cole Bixler	So
CB	38	J'Ravien Anderson	Fr
LB	39	Cole Bonde	Jr
DE	40	Spencer Phillips	Fr
FS	41	Jacob Gassman	Fr
LB	43	Jacob Vollstedt	Sr
LB	44	Matt Connelly	So
LB	45	Nick Hess	So
LB	46	Eli Keller	Fr
LB	47	Jamaal Brazil	Fr
LB	51	Andy Hessler	Fr
LB	55	Cole Forney	RSr
LB	56	Ben Althoff	So
DE	57	Myles Scott	Fr
DE	63	Mike Ehlke	Fr
DT	68	Caleb Mather	Jr
DE	73	Cass Weitl	Sr
DL	91	Zach Pierce	Fr
DE	92	Bobby Gruenloh	Jr
DE	93	Curt Mueller	Fr
DE	97	Harold Brantley	Sr
DT	98	Brent Morrow	So
DT	99	Ben Spaeth	Jr
S		Braxton Anderson	Fr
LB		Jackson Barnes	Fr
S		Blake Bayer	Fr
S		Dakota Beemer	Fr
S		Montel Berry	Fr
LB		Tyler Boehm	Fr
LB		Brody Buck	Fr
S		Ruon Chuol	Fr
DE		Austin Ellis	Fr
DB		Donte Felix-Glover	Fr
DB		Aundra Gilbert	Fr
DT		Blake Green	Fr
DB		Chance Hall	Fr
DE		Tommy Hyland	Fr
DE		Shelby McMillen	Fr
DT		Jake Noel	Fr
DE		Will Obert	Fr
DT		Dustin Piper	Fr
S		Gore Pitia	Fr
DE		Sam Roberts	Fr
DE		Spencer Sidzyik	Fr
DB		Taj Taylor	Fr
DE		Noah Williams	Fr

Special teams

Pos.	#	Name	Class
K	30	Ben Trewyn	Sr
P	50	Anthony Babida	Jr
LS	54	Michael Sorfonden	Fr
K	88	Simon Mathiesen	Sr
P	95	Matt Thorman	So
K		Chris Hahn	Fr

Head coach

- Adam Dorrel

Coordinators/assistant coaches

- See coaching staff

Legend

- (C) Team captain
- (S) Suspended
- (I) Ineligible
- Injured
- Redshirt

Roster
Last update: 2016-08-26
