= Orson =

Orson may refer to:

== Places ==
=== United States ===
- Orson, Iowa, an unincorporated community
- Orson, Pennsylvania, a village in Preston Township, Wayne County, Pennsylvania

=== Fictional places ===
- Orson, Indiana, a small fictional town in the TV series The Middle

== People ==
- Orson (given name), including a list of people and fictional characters with the name

== Other uses ==
- Orson (band), a former American rock band

== See also ==
- Orso (disambiguation)
