= Steve Stanard =

American football coach

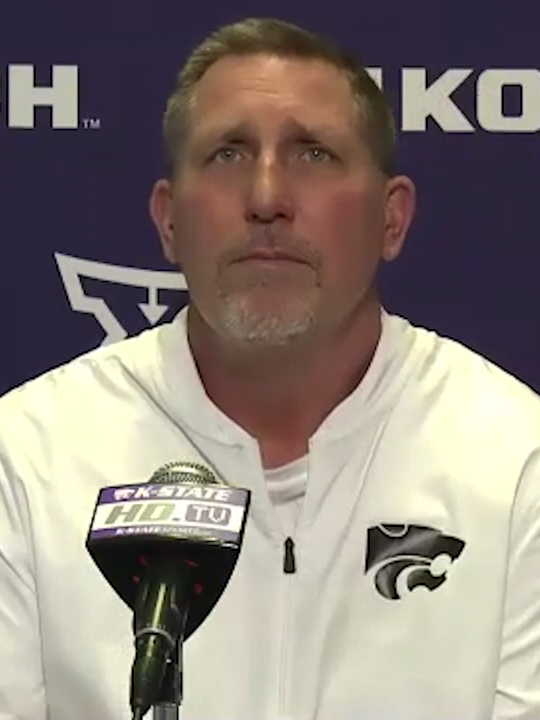
- Stanard in 2021

Current position
- Title: Rush ends coach
- Team: Minnesota
- Conference: Big Ten

Playing career
- 1984–1987: Nebraska
- Position: Defensive end

Coaching career (HC unless noted)
- 1988: Nebraska (SA)
- 1989–1990: Nebraska (GA)
- 1991–1993: Nebraska Wesleyan (DC)
- 1994–1995: Nebraska Wesleyan
- 1996: South Dakota (DC)
- 1997–1999: New Mexico State (DE/OLB)
- 2000–2002: New Mexico State (DC/LB)
- 2003–2007: Colorado State (DC/LB)
- 2008: Ohio (DL)
- 2009–2011: Tulane (DC/LB)
- 2012–2013: North Dakota State (LB)
- 2014–2016: Wyoming (DC/LB)
- 2017–2019: Syracuse (DE)
- 2020–2025: Kansas State (LB)
- 2026: Minnesota (Rush Ends)

Head coaching record
- Overall: 6–14

Steve Stanard is an American college football coach and former player. He is the rush ends coach at Minnesota, a position he has held since 2026. Stanard served as the interim defensive coordinator at Syracuse following the firing of Brian Ward after a blowout loss to Boston College late in the 2019 season. Stanard was the head football coach at Nebraska Wesleyan University from 1994 to 1995, compiling a record of 6–14. Stanard played college football at the University of Nebraska–Lincoln, where he lettered in 1987.

== Head coaching record ==
Year	Coach	Overall	Conference	Standing	Bowl/playoffs
Nebraska Wesleyan Plainsmen (Nebraska-Iowa Athletic Conference) (1994–1995)
1994	Nebraska Wesleyan	3–7	2–4	5th	
1995	Nebraska Wesleyan	3–7	2–4	6th	
Nebraska Wesleyan:		6–14	4–8		
Total:		6–14			
