= Roy B. Robertson =

American football coach and administrator (1919–2000)

Biographical details
- Born: September 9, 1919; Pretty Prairie, Kansas, U.S.
- Died: March 1, 2000 (aged 80); Manhattan, Kansas, U.S.

Playing career

Football
- 1936–1939: McPherson

Basketball
- 1936–1940: McPherson

Track
- 1936–1940: McPherson
- Position: End (football)

Coaching career (HC unless noted)
- 1945–1949: Springfield HS (MO)
- 1950–1953: Nebraska Wesleyan
- 1954–1956: Colorado College

Administrative career (AD unless noted)
- 1950–?: Nebraska Wesleyan

Head coaching record
- Overall: 20–44–4 (college); 29–15–3 (high school)

Roy B. Robertson (September 9, 1919 – March 1, 2000) was an American football coach and college athletics administrator. He served as the head football coach at Nebraska Wesleyan University in Lincoln, Nebraska from 1950 to 1953 and Colorado College in Colorado Springs, Colorado from 1954 to 1956, compiling a career college football coaching record of 20–44–4.

Robertson letters in football, basketball, track at from McPherson College in McPherson, Kansas before graduating in 1940.

== Head coaching record ==
=== College ===
Year	Team	Overall	Conference	Standing	Bowl/playoffs
Nebraska Wesleyan Plainsmen (Nebraska College Conference) (1950–1954)
1950	Nebraska Wesleyan	5–5	4–3	6th	
1951	Nebraska Wesleyan	2–8	2–5	6th	
1952	Nebraska Wesleyan	5–5	4–3	T–3rd	
1953	Nebraska Wesleyan	2–4–3	1–4–2	7th	
Nebraska Wesleyan:		14–22–3	11–15–2		
Colorado College Tigers (Rocky Mountain Conference) (1954–1956)
1954	Colorado College	1–8–1	0–7–1	6th	
1955	Colorado College	3–7	2–6	5th	
1956	Colorado College	2–7	1–4	5th	
Colorado College:		6–22–1	3–17–1		
Total:		20–44–4			
