= 1925 South Dakota State Jackrabbits football team =

American college football season

1925 South Dakota State Jackrabbits football
- Conference: North Central Conference
- Record: 2–3–2 (1–1–2 NCC)
- Head coach: Charles A. West (7th season)

1925 North Central Conference football standings
	Conf.					Overall
Team	W		L		T	W		L		T
Nebraska Wesleyan +	3	–	0	–	1	6	–	0	–	2
Creighton +	3	–	0	–	1	6	–	3	–	1
North Dakota Agricultural +	4	–	0	–	2	5	–	0	–	2
North Dakota	2	–	2	–	0	4	–	4	–	0
South Dakota State	1	–	1	–	2	2	–	3	–	2
Morningside	2	–	4	–	0	3	–	5	–	0
South Dakota	1	–	4	–	0	3	–	5	–	0
Des Moines	0	–	4	–	0	0	–	7	–	1
+ – Conference co-champions

The 1925 South Dakota State Jackrabbits football team was an American football team that represented South Dakota State University in the North Central Conference during the 1925 college football season. In its seventh season under head coach Charles A. West, the team compiled a 2–3–2 record and was outscored by a total of 45 to 20. Frank Kelley was the team captain.

South Dakota State center Starbuck was selected as a first-team player on the 1925 All-North Central Conference football team.

== Schedule ==
Date	Opponent	Site	Result	Attendance	Source
September 26	Dakota Wesleyan*	Brookings, SD	W 7–0		
October 3	Buena Vista*	Brookings, SD	L 0–14		
October 10	Nebraska Wesleyan	Brookings, SD	T 3–3		
October 17	at North Dakota Agricultural	Fargo, ND (rivalry)	T 3–3		
October 24	Creighton	Brookings, SD	L 0–19		
October 31	South Dakota	Vermillion, SD (rivalry)	W 7–0		
November 14	at Marquette*	Marquette Stadium; Milwaukee, WI	L 0–6		
*Non-conference game
