= John D. Waldorf =

American football player, coach, and official (1909–1982)

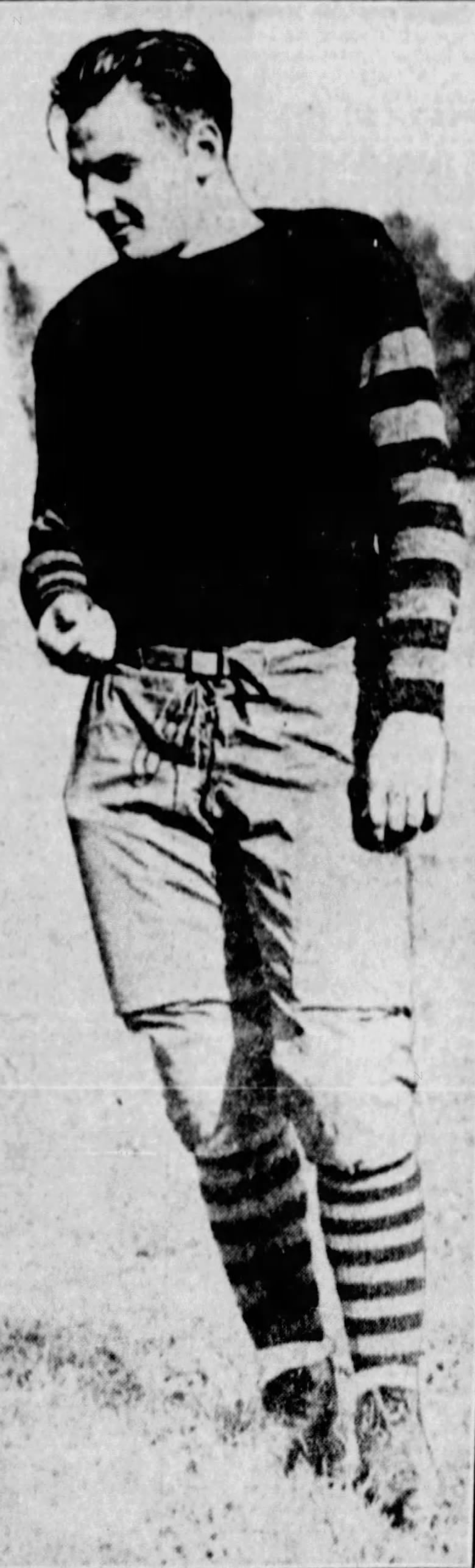
- Waldorf in 1929

Biographical details
- Born: July 29, 1909; Syracuse, New York, U.S.
- Died: August 12, 1982 (aged 73); Marshall, Missouri, U.S.

Playing career

Football
- 1927–1929: Missouri

Basketball
- 1927–1930: Missouri
- Positions: Fullback, quarterback (football)

Coaching career (HC unless noted)

Football
- 1930–1932: Nebraska Wesleyan

Basketball
- 1930–1933: Nebraska Wesleyan

Administrative career (AD unless noted)
- 1930–1933: Nebraska Wesleyan

Head coaching record
- Overall: 14–9–2 (football); 22–34 (basketball)

Accomplishments and honors

Championships
- 2 NCAC (1931–1932)

Awards
- First-team All-Big Six (1929); Second-team All-Big Six (1928)

John David Waldorf (July 29, 1909 – August 12, 1982) was an American football player and coach and, later, a long-time college football and college basketball official.

== Career ==
He played college football at the University of Missouri, where he was a two-time All-Big Six selection. Waldorf served as the head football coach at Nebraska Wesleyan University in Lincoln, Nebraska from 1930 to 1932. After retiring from coaching, he became an official in the Big Eight Conference.

Waldorf was the brother of college football coaches Pappy Waldorf, Paul D. Waldorf, and Bob Waldorf, as well as the son of Methodist Episcopal Church bishop Ernest Lynn Waldorf. He died on August 12, 1982, at Fitzgibbon Memorial Hospital in Marshall, Missouri.

== Head coaching record ==
=== Football ===
Year	Team	Overall	Conference	Standing	Bowl/playoffs
Nebraska Wesleyan Coyotes (Nebraska College Athletic Conference) (1930–1932)
1930	Nebraska Wesleyan	6–3	4–1	2nd	
1931	Nebraska Wesleyan	4–3–1	4–0–1	1st	
1932	Nebraska Wesleyan	4–3–1	4–0–1	T–1st	
Nebraska Wesleyan:		14–9–2	12–1–2		
Total:		14–9–2			
National championship Conference title Conference division title or championship game berth
