= 1925 North Dakota Flickertails football team =

American college football season

1925 North Dakota Flickertails football
- Conference: North Central Conference
- Record: 4–4 (2–2 NCC)
- Head coach: Paul J. Davis (7th season)
- Captain: Mike Geston

1925 North Central Conference football standings
| | Conf. | | | | | Overall |
| Team | W | | L | | T | W | | L | | T |
|---|---|---|---|---|---|---|---|---|---|---|
| Nebraska Wesleyan + | 3 | – | 0 | – | 1 | 6 | – | 0 | – | 2 |
| Creighton + | 3 | – | 0 | – | 1 | 6 | – | 3 | – | 1 |
| North Dakota Agricultural + | 4 | – | 0 | – | 2 | 5 | – | 0 | – | 2 |
| North Dakota | 2 | – | 2 | – | 0 | 4 | – | 4 | – | 0 |
| South Dakota State | 1 | – | 1 | – | 2 | 2 | – | 3 | – | 2 |
| Morningside | 2 | – | 4 | – | 0 | 3 | – | 5 | – | 0 |
| South Dakota | 1 | – | 4 | – | 0 | 3 | – | 5 | – | 0 |
| Des Moines | 0 | – | 4 | – | 0 | 0 | – | 7 | – | 1 |
+ – Conference co-champions

The 1925 North Dakota Flickertails football team, also known as the Nodaks, was an American football team that represented University of North Dakota in North Central Conference (NCC) during the 1925 college football season. In its seventh and final season under head coach Paul J. Davis, the team compiled a 4–4 record (2–2 against NCC opponents), tied for fourth place in the NCC, and outscored opponents by a total of 165 to 77.

North Dakota end Geston was selected as a first-team player on the 1925 All-North Central Conference football team.

== Schedule ==
| Date | Opponent | Site | Result | Attendance | Source |
|---|---|---|---|---|---|
| September 26 | Moorhead Normal* | Grand Forks, ND | W 4–0 | | |
| October 3 | at Minnesota* | Memorial Stadium; Minneapolis, MN | L 6–25 | 20,000 | |
| October 10 | Jamestown* | Grand Forks, ND | W 58–0 | | |
| October 17 | South Dakota^{†} | Grand Forks, ND (rivalry) | W 3–0 | | |
| October 24 | Morningside | Grand Forks, ND | W 27–0 | | |
| October 31 | North Dakota Agricultural | Grand Forks, ND (rivalry) | L 10–19 | | |
| November 14 | at Creighton | Omaha, NE | L 7–20 | 7,000 | |
| November 21 | at Marquette* | Marquette Stadium; Milwaukee, WI | L 0–13 | | |
*Non-conference game; ^{†}Homecoming
