= George M. Farley =

American football player and sports coach

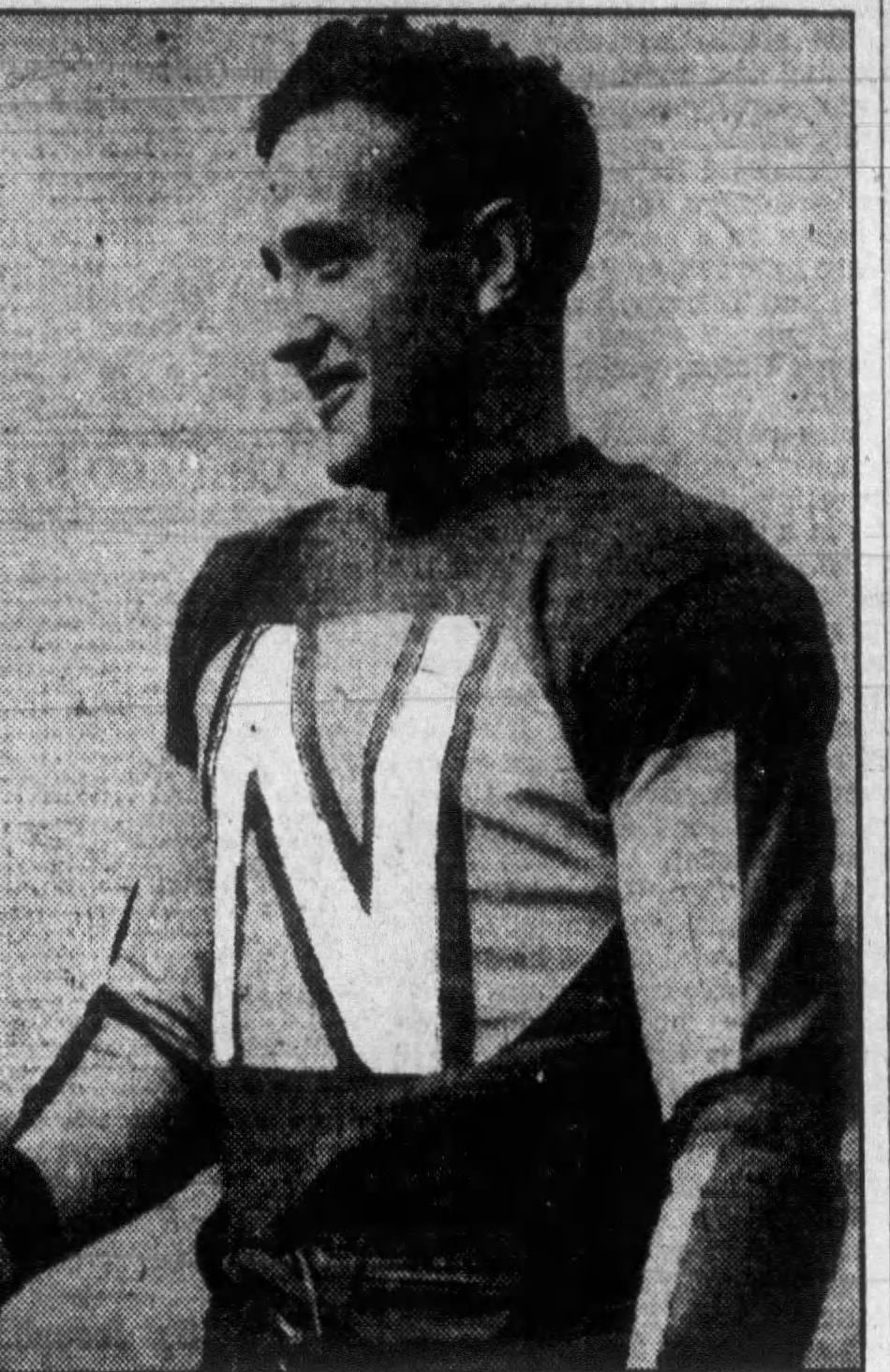
- Farley in 1929

Playing career

Football
- 1927–1929: Nebraska
- Position: Halfback

Coaching career (HC unless noted)

Football
- 1930–1932: Goodland HS (KS)
- 1933–1934: Nebraska Wesleyan (assistant)
- 1935–1936: Nebraska Wesleyan
- 1941–1942: Nebraska Wesleyan

Basketball
- 1933–1937: Nebraska Wesleyan
- 1940–1943: Nebraska Wesleyan

Administrative career (AD unless noted)
- 1940–1942: Nebraska Wesleyan

Head coaching record
- Overall: 17–15–3 (college football); 31–51 (college basketball)

Accomplishments and honors

Awards
- Second-team All-Big Six (1929)

George M. Farley was an American football player and collegiate football and basketball coach. He served as the head football coach (1935–1936, 1941–1942) and head men's basketball coach (1933–1937, 1940–1943) at Nebraska Wesleyan University in Lincoln, Nebraska.

Farley played college football at the University of Nebraska–Lincoln, lettering from 1927 to 1929 as a halfback.

== Head coaching record ==
=== College football ===
Year	Team	Overall	Conference	Standing	Bowl/playoffs
Nebraska Wesleyan Plainsmen (Nebraska College Athletic Conference) (1935–1936)
1935	Nebraska Wesleyan	5–3–1	2–1–1	2nd	
1936	Nebraska Wesleyan	5–3	3–1	2nd	
Nebraska Wesleyan Plainsmen (Nebraska College Athletic Conference) (1941–1942)
1941	Nebraska Wesleyan	2–6–1	2–2	3rd	
1942	Nebraska Wesleyan	5–3–1	3–1	2nd	
Nebraska Wesleyan:		17–15–3	10–5–1		
Total:		17–15–3			
