= 1929 All-Big Six Conference football team =

The 1929 All-Big Six Conference football team consists of American football players chosen by various organizations for All-Big Six Conference teams for the 1929 college football season. The selectors for the 1929 season included the Associated Press (AP).

== All-Big Six selections ==
=== Ends ===
- H. Keith Hursley, Missouri (AP-1)
- Tom Churchill, Oklahoma (AP-1)
- Steve Hokuf, Nebraska (AP-2)
- William G. Towler, Kansas State (AP-2)

=== Tackles ===
- Ray Richards, Nebraska (AP-1)
- Cookie Tackwell, Kansas State (AP-1)
- Jack Schopflin, Kansas (AP-2)
- Marion Broadstone, Nebraska (AP-2)

=== Guards ===
- George Atkeson, Kansas (AP-1)
- K. C. Bauman, Kansas State (AP-1)
- George Koster, Nebraska (AP-2)
- Weldon Gentry, Oklahoma (AP-2)

=== Centers ===
- Raymond Smith, Missouri (AP-1)
- Frank Bausch, Kansas (AP-2)

=== Quarterbacks ===
- John Waldorf, Missouri (AP-1)
- Alex Nigro, Kansas State (AP-2)

=== Halfbacks ===
- James Bausch, Kansas (AP-1)
- Frank Crider, Oklahoma (AP-1)
- George Farley, Nebraska, (AP-2)
- George Wiggins, Kansas State (AP-2)

=== Fullbacks ===
- Clair Sloan, Nebraska (AP-1)
- Earl Fox, Kansas (AP-2)

== Key ==
AP = Associated Press

== See also ==
- 1929 College Football All-America Team
