= Harold G. Chaffee =

American football player and coach (1926–2020)

Biographical details
- Born: June 6, 1926; Littleton, Colorado, U.S.
- Died: October 6, 2020 (aged 94); Nebraska, U.S.

Playing career
- 1946–1947: Colorado A&M
- 1949: Colorado A&M
- Position: Quarterback

Coaching career (HC unless noted)
- 1967–1968: Nebraska Wesleyan (assistant)
- 1969–1981: Nebraska Wesleyan

Head coaching record
- Overall: 55–61–2

Harold George Chaffee (June 6, 1926 – October 6, 2020) was an American college football player and coach. He served as the head football coach at Nebraska Wesleyan University in Lincoln, Nebraska, from 1969 to 1981, compiling a record of 55–61–2. As a player, Chaffee was a quarterback at Colorado State College of Agriculture and Mechanic Arts—now known as Colorado State University—in the late 1940s. Chaffee served in the United States Navy with the Seabees during World War II. He died in October 2020 at the age of 94.
