= Great Plains College Association =

American college sports conference, 1963–1965

The Great Plains College Association (GPCA) was a short-lived intercollegiate athletic conference that existed from 1963 to 1965. The league had members in Colorado and Nebraska.

== Football champions ==
- 1963 – Nebraska Wesleyan
- 1964 – Nebraska Wesleyan

== Yearly football standings ==
1963 Great Plains College Association football standings
	Conf.					Overall
Team	W		L		T	W		L		T
Nebraska Wesleyan $	3	–	0	–	0	7	–	2	–	0
Hastings	2	–	1	–	0	5	–	3	–	1
Colorado College	1	–	2	–	0	4	–	6	–	0
Doane	0	–	3	–	0	3	–	6	–	0
$ – Conference champion

1964 Great Plains College Association football standings
	Conf.					Overall
Team	W		L		T	W		L		T
Nebraska Wesleyan $	3	–	0	–	0	7	–	1	–	0
Hastings	2	–	1	–	0	6	–	3	–	0
Doane	1	–	2	–	0	3	–	5	–	1
Colorado College	0	–	3	–	0	1	–	7	–	0
$ – Conference champion

== See also ==
- List of defunct college football conferences
