= Bartley, Nebraska =

Village in Red Willow County, Nebraska, United States

- Village
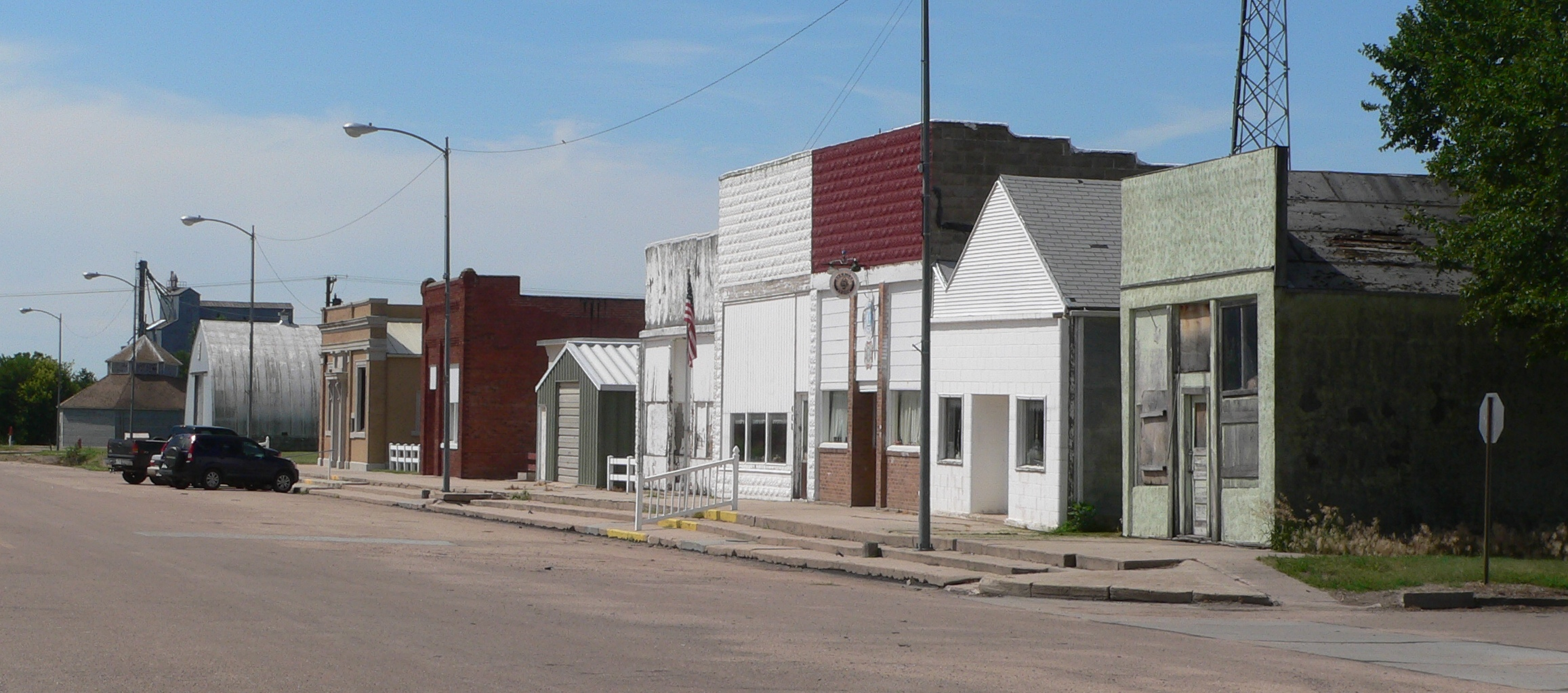
- Downtown Bartley: west side of Commercial Street, July 2010

- Location of Bartley, Nebraska
- Coordinates: 40°15′04″N 100°18′38″W
- Country: United States
- State: Nebraska
- County: Red Willow

Area
  - Total: 0.94 sq mi (2.43 km^{2})
  - Land: 0.94 sq mi (2.43 km^{2})
  - Water: 0 sq mi (0.00 km^{2})
- Elevation: 2,346 ft (715 m)

Population (2020)
  - Total: 270
  - Density: 288.0/sq mi (111.18/km^{2})
- Time zone: UTC-6 (Central (CST))
  - Summer (DST): UTC-5 (CDT)
- ZIP code: 69020
- Area code: 308
- FIPS code: 31-03180
- GNIS feature ID: 2398043

Bartley is a village in Red Willow County, Nebraska, United States. The population was 270 at the 2020 census.

== History ==
Bartley was platted in 1886 when the Chicago, Burlington and Quincy Railroad was extended to that point. It was named for Rev. Allen Bartley, the original owner of the town site.

== Geography ==
According to the United States Census Bureau, the village has a total area of 0.70 square miles (1.81 km^{2}), all land.

== Demographics ==
Historical population
Census	Pop.	Note	%±
1890	220		—
1900	307		39.5%
1910	511		66.4%
1920	251		−50.9%
1930	485		93.2%
1940	380		−21.6%
1950	399		5.0%
1960	309		−22.6%
1970	283		−8.4%
1980	342		20.8%
1990	339		−0.9%
2000	355		4.7%
2010	283		−20.3%
2020	270		−4.6%
U.S. Decennial Census

=== 2010 census ===
At the 2010 census, there were 283 people, 126 households and 87 families residing in the village. The population density was 404.3 per square mile (156.1/km^{2}). There were 156 housing units at an average density of 222.9 per square mile (86.1/km^{2}). The racial make-up of the village was 98.2% White, 0.7% Native American, 0.7% from other races and 0.4% from two or more races. Hispanic or Latino of any race were 2.8% of the population.

There were 126 households, of which 23.8% had children under the age of 18 living with them, 53.2% were married couples living together, 10.3% had a female householder with no husband present, 5.6% had a male householder with no wife present and 31.0% were non-families. 28.6% of all households were made up of individuals, and 19.9% had someone living alone who was 65 years of age or older. The average household size was 2.25 and the average family size was 2.66.

The median age was 47.4 years. 18.7% of residents were under the age of 18, 10.2% were between the ages of 18 and 24, 16.8% were from 25 to 44, 28.6% were from 45 to 64 and 25.4% were 65 years of age or older. The sex make-up of the village was 45.6% male and 54.4% female.

=== 2000 census ===
At the 2000 census, there were 355 people, 146 households and 107 families residing in the village. The population density was 511.3 per square mile (197.4/km^{2}). There were 157 housing units at an average density of 226.1 per square mile (87.3/km^{2}). The racial make-up of the village was 97.75% White, 1.13% from other races and 1.13% from two or more races. Hispanic or Latino of any race were 2.54% of the population.

There were 146 households, of which 30.8% had children under the age of 18 living with them, 61.6% were married couples living together, 6.8% had a female householder with no husband present and 26.7% were non-families. 26.0% of all households were made up of individuals and 14.4% had someone living alone who was 65 years of age or older. The average household size was 2.43 and the average family size was 2.92.

26.8% of the population were under the age of 18, 7.0% from 18 to 24, 22.5% from 25 to 44, 23.7% from 45 to 64 and 20.0% were 65 years of age or older. The median age was 40 years. For every 100 females, there were 99.4 males. For every 100 females age 18 and over, there were 88.4 males.

The median household income was $31,111 and the median family income was $36,406. Males had a median income of $27,917 and females $22,143. The per capita income was $14,824. About 6.9% of families and 11.4% of the population were below the poverty line, including 22.1% of those under age 18 and 6.6% of those age 65 or over.

== See also ==
- List of municipalities in Nebraska
