= Nebraska Wesleyan Prairie Wolves football =

College football team

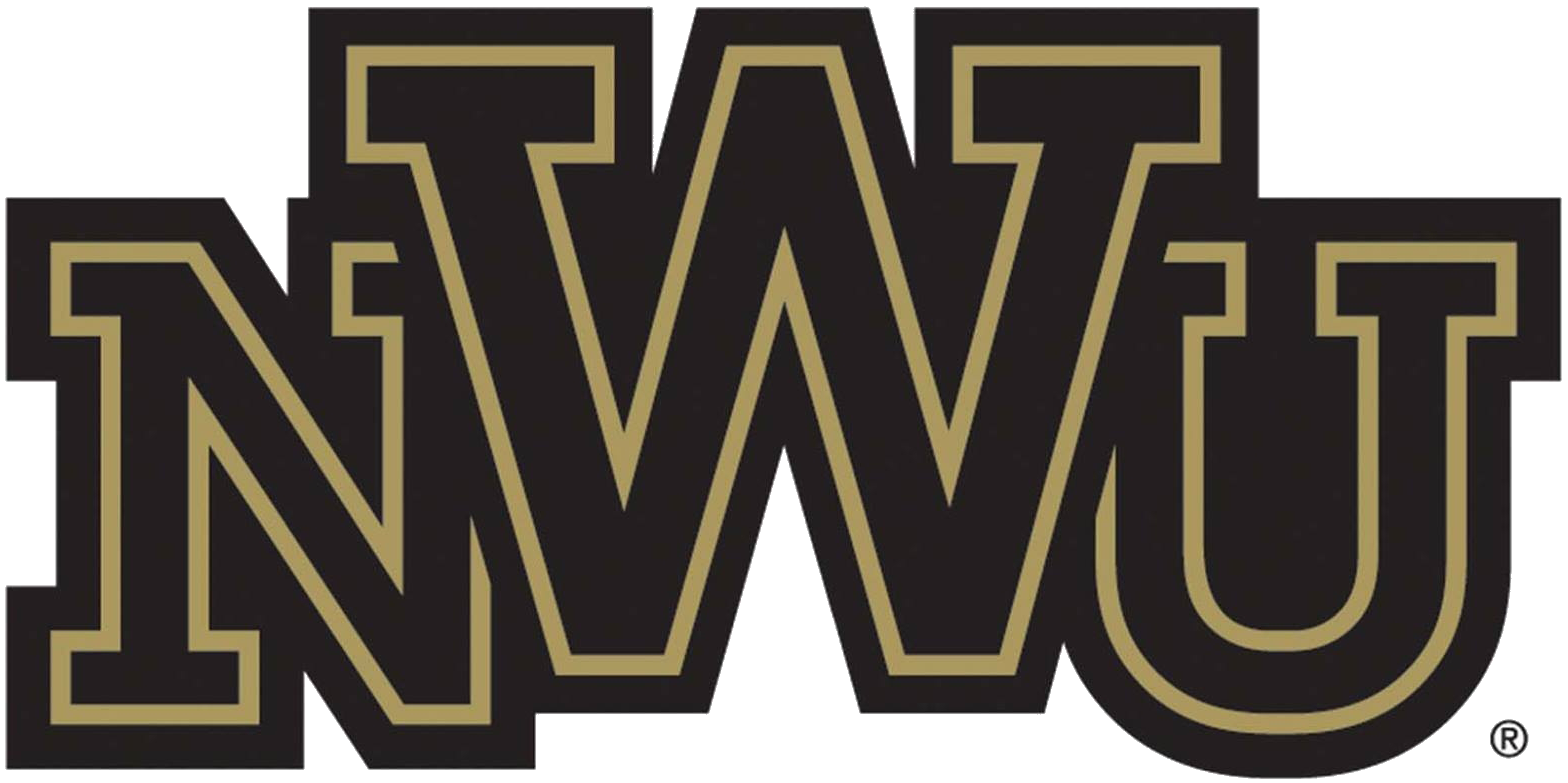
- First season: 1891; 135 years ago
- Athletic director: Dwight Merilatt
- Head coach: Jacob Donohoe; 1st season, 0–0 (–)
- Location: Lincoln, Nebraska
- Stadium: Abel Stadium (capacity: 2,500)
- NCAA division: Division III
- Conference: ARC
- Colors: Gold and black
- All-time record: 515–478–42 (.518)

Conference championships
- 22
- Rivalries: Doane
- Mascot: Prairie Wolves
- Website: nwusports.com/football

The Nebraska Wesleyan Prairie Wolves football team represents Nebraska Wesleyan University in college football at the NCAA Division III level. The Prairie Wolves are members of the American Rivers Conference (ARC), fielding its team in the ARC since 2016 when it was named the Iowa Intercollegiate Athletic Conference (IIAC). Nebraska Wesleyan plays home games at Abel Stadium in Lincoln, Nebraska. The team's head coach is Brian Keller, who took over the position for the 1996 season.

== History ==
Nebraska Wesleyan's athletic teams were known as the Coyotes in the early 1900s. The nickname was changed to the Plainsmen in 1933 and then to the Prairie Wolves in 2000.

In November 2026, Nataly Miller became the first woman to score while playing for the Nebraska Wesleyan football team; she scored a field goal.

== Conference affiliations ==
NAIA / pre-NCAA

- Nebraska Conference (1911–1915; rebranded, 1926–1927; rebranded)
- Nebraska Intercollegiate Conference (1916–1923)
- North Central Conference (1924–1925)
- Nebraska College Athletic Conference (1928–1942)
- Nebraska College Conference (1946–1961)
- Great Plains College Association (1963–1964)
- Nebraska Intercollegiate Athletic Conference (1970–1991; rebranded)
- Nebraska–Iowa Athletic Conference (1992–1999; rebranded)
- Great Plains Athletic Conference (2000–2015)

NCAA

- Iowa Intercollegiate Athletic Conference (2016–2017; rebranded)
- American Rivers Conference (2018–present)

== Championships ==
=== Conference championships ===
Nebraska Wesleyan claims 22 conference titles, the most recent of which came in 2000.

Year	Conference	Overall record	Conference record	Coach
1911	Nebraska Conference	7–0	N/A	William G. Kline
1912	Nebraska Conference	5–2–1	N/A	William G. Kline
1913†	Nebraska Conference	4–3–1	N/A	William G. Kline
1914	Nebraska Conference	7–1	N/A	William G. Kline
1915	Nebraska Conference	6–3	N/A	William G. Kline
1918	Nebraska Intercollegiate Conference	2–3	N/A	William A. Norris
1920	Nebraska Intercollegiate Conference	6–2–2	4–0–1	Ray B. McCandless
1921	Nebraska Intercollegiate Conference	8–3	5–0	Ray B. McCandless
1925†	North Central Conference	6–0–2	3–0–1	Clarence L. Dow
1931	Nebraska College Athletic Conference	4–3–1	4–0–1	John D. Waldorf
1932†	Nebraska College Athletic Conference	4–3–1	4–0–1	John D. Waldorf
1934	Nebraska College Athletic Conference	6–2–1	4–0	John E. Roberts
1947†	Nebraska College Conference	7–1–1	5–1–1	George "Bus" Knight
1963	Great Plains College Association	7–2	3–0	Raymond Westover
1964	Great Plains College Association	7–1	3–0	Raymond Westover
1976†	Nebraska Intercollegiate Athletic Conference	6–3	4–1	Harold G. Chaffee
1983†	Nebraska Intercollegiate Athletic Conference	7–3	4–1	Orson Christensen
1986	Nebraska Intercollegiate Athletic Conference	7–3	5–0	Orson Christensen
1988	Nebraska Intercollegiate Athletic Conference	8–2	5–0	Jim Svoboda
1989	Nebraska Intercollegiate Athletic Conference	10–2	5–0	Jim Svoboda
1990†	Nebraska Intercollegiate Athletic Conference	7–2	4–1	Jim Svoboda
2000†	Great Plains Athletic Conference	8–3	6–2	Brian Keller

† Co-champions

== Postseason games ==
=== NAIA playoff games ===
The Prairie Wolves have appeared in the NAIA playoffs four times with an overall record of 1–4.

Season	Coach	Playoff	Opponent	Result
1988	Jim Svoboda	First round	Evangel	L 14–45
1989	Jim Svoboda	First round Quarterfinals	Chadron State; Wisconsin–La Crosse	W 46–43; L 0–29
1991	Jim Svoboda	First round	Peru State	L 20–41
2000	Brian Keller	First round	Northwestern Oklahoma State	L 13–40

=== Bowl games ===
Nebraska Wesleyan has participated in one bowl game, and has a record of 0–1.

Season	Coach	Bowl	Opponent	Result
1946	George Knight	Will Rogers Bowl	Pepperdine	L 13–38

== List of head coaches ==
=== Key ===
Key to symbols in coaches list
General		Overall		Conference		Postseason (Note: Although the first Rose Bowl Game was played in 1902, it has been continuously played since the 1916 game, and is recognized as the oldest bowl game by the NCAA. "—" indicates any season prior to 1916 when postseason games were not played.)	
No.	Order of coaches (Note: A running total of the number of head coaches, with coaches who served separate tenures being counted only once. Interim head coaches are represented with "Int" and are not counted in the running total. "—" indicates the team played but either without a coach or no coach is on record. "X" indicates an interim year without play.)	GC	Games coached	CW	Conference wins	PW	Postseason wins
DC	Division championships	OW	Overall wins	CL	Conference losses	PL	Postseason losses
CC	Conference championships	OL	Overall losses	CT	Conference ties	PT	Postseason ties
NC	National championships	OT	Overall ties (Note: Overtime rules in college football were introduced in 1996, making ties impossible in the period since.)	C%	Conference winning percentage		
†	Elected to the College Football Hall of Fame	O%	Overall winning percentage (Note: When computing the win–loss percentage, a tie counts as half a win and half a loss.)				

=== Coaches ===
List of head football coaches showing season(s) coached, overall records, conference records, postseason records, championships and selected awards
No.	Name	Season(s)	GC	OW	OL	OT	O%	CW	CL	CT	C%	PW	PL	PT	DC	CC	NC	Awards
1	Frank Crawford	1896	5	3	2	0	0.600	–	–	–	–	–	–	–	–	–	–	–
2	Charley Thomas	1897	7	5	2	0	0.714	–	–	–	–	–	–	–	–	–	–	–
3	Zora Clevenger	1908; 1910	9	2	7	0	0.222	–	–	–	–	–	–	–	–	–	–	–
4	William G. Kline	1909; 1911–1917	62	37	19	6	0.645	–	–	–	–	–	–	–	–	–	–	–
5	William A. Norris	1918	5	2	3	0	0.400	–	–	–	–	–	–	–	–	–	–	–
6	Benjamin Beck	1919	9	7	2	0	0.778	–	–	–	–	–	–	–	–	–	–	–
7	Ray McCandless	1920–1922	29	17	9	3	0.638	–	–	–	–	–	–	–	–	–	–	–
8	Glenn Preston	1923–1924	17	8	5	4	0.588	–	–	–	–	–	–	–	–	–	–	–
9	Clarence Dow	1925–1926	18	12	4	2	0.722	–	–	–	–	–	–	–	–	–	–	–
10	Howard Durham	1927	9	0	8	1	0.056	–	–	–	–	–	–	–	–	–	–	–
11	Francis Alabaster	1928–1929	18	5	10	3	0.361	–	–	–	–	–	–	–	–	–	–	–
12	John Waldorf	1930–1932	25	14	9	2	0.600	–	–	–	–	–	–	–	–	–	–	–
13	John E. Roberts	1933–1934	18	9	7	2	0.556	–	–	–	–	–	–	–	–	–	–	–
14	George Farley	1935; 1941–1942	27	13	11	3	0.537	–	–	–	–	–	–	–	–	–	–	–
15	Dwight Thomas	1936–1940	42	14	26	2	0.357	–	–	–	–	–	–	–	–	–	–	–
16	Allen Stroh	1945	5	3	2	0	0.600	–	–	–	–	–	–	–	–	–	–	–
17	George Knight	1946–1949	37	24	9	4	0.703	–	–	–	–	–	–	–	–	–	–	–
18	Roy Roberston	1950–1953	39	14	22	3	0.397	–	–	–	–	–	–	–	–	–	–	–
19	Keith Skogman	1954–1959	56	21	32	3	0.402	–	–	–	–	–	–	–	–	–	–	–
20	Raymond Westover	1960–1968	78	36	40	2	0.474	–	–	–	–	–	–	–	–	–	–	–
21	Harold Chaffee	1969–1981	118	55	61	2	0.475	–	–	–	–	–	–	–	–	–	–	–
22	Orson Christensen	1982–1986	49	29	20	0	0.592	–	–	–	–	–	–	–	–	–	–	–
23	Jim Svoboda	1987–1993	71	51	20	0	0.718	–	–	–	–	–	–	–	–	–	–	–
24	Steve Stanard	1994–1995	20	6	14	0	0.300	–	–	–	–	–	–	–	–	–	–	–
25	Brian Keller	1996–2025	292	133	159	0	0.455	–	–	–	–	–	–	–	–	–	–	–
26	Jacob Donohoe	2026–present	0	0	0	–	–	–	–	–	–	–	–	–	–	–	–	

== Year-by-year results ==
National champions	Conference champions	Bowl game berth	Playoff berth

Season	Year	Head coach	Association	Division	Conference	Record							Postseason	Final ranking
Season	Year	Head coach	Association	Division	Conference	Overall			Conference				Postseason	Final ranking
Season	Year	Head coach	Association	Division	Conference	Win	Loss	Tie	Finish	Win	Loss	Tie	Postseason	Final ranking
Nebraska Wesleyan Prairie Wolves
1896	1896	Frank Crawford	–	–	–	3	2	0	–	–	–	–	—	—
1897	1897	Charley Thomas	–	–	–	5	2	0	–	–	–	–	—	—
No team from 1888 to 1907
1908	1908	Zora Cleavenger	–	–	–	1	2	0	–	–	–	–	—	—
1909	1909	William G. Kline	–	–	–	0	1	3	–	–	–	–	—	—
1910	1910	Zora Cleavenger	–	–	–	1	5	0	–	–	–	–	—	—
1911	1911	William G. Kline	–	–	Nebraska	7	0	0	1st	–	–	–	Conference champions	—
1912	1912	William G. Kline	–	–	Nebraska	5	2	1	1st	–	–	–	Conference champions	—
1913	1913	William G. Kline	–	–	Nebraska	4	3	1	T-1st	–	–	–	Conference co-champions	—
1914	1914	William G. Kline	–	–	Nebraska	7	1	0	1st	–	–	–	Conference champions	—
1915	1915	William G. Kline	–	–	Nebraska	6	3	0	1st	–	–	–	Conference champions	—
1916	1916	William G. Kline	–	–	NIC	5	4	1	2nd	–	–	–	—	—
1917	1917	William G. Kline	–	–	NIC	3	5	0	3rd	–	–	–	—	—
1918	1918	William A. Norris	–	–	NIC	2	3	0	1st	–	–	–	Conference champions	—
1919	1919	Benjamin Beck	–	–	NIC	7	2	0	2nd	–	–	–	—	—
1920	1920	Ray B. McCandless	–	–	NIC	6	2	2	1st	–	–	–	Conference champions	—
1921	1921	Ray B. McCandless	–	–	NIC	7	3	0	1st	–	–	–	Conference champions	—
1922	1922	Ray B. McCandless	–	–	NIC	4	4	1	3rd	–	–	–	—	—
1923	1923	Glenn A. Preston	–	–	NIC	6	1	2	2nd	–	–	–	—	—
1924	1924	Glenn A. Preston	–	–	NCC	2	4	2	T-5th	1	2	0	—	—
1925	1925	Clarence L. Dow	–	–	NCC	6	0	2	1st	3	0	1	Conference champions	—
1926	1926	Clarence L. Dow	–	–	Nebraska	6	4	0	2nd	–	–	–	—	—
1927	1927	Howard Durham	–	–	Nebraska	0	8	1	13th	–	–	–	—	—
1928	1928	Francis Alabaster	–	–	NCAC	5	2	2	3rd	2	1	2	—	—
1929	1929	Francis Alabaster	–	–	NCAC	3	5	1	5th	2	3	0	—	—
1930	1930	John D. Waldorf	–	–	NCAC	6	3		2nd	4	1	0	—	—
1931	1931	John D. Waldorf	–	–	NCAC	4	3	1	1st	4	0	1	Conference champions	—
1932	1932	John D. Waldorf	–	–	NCAC	4	3	1	T-1st	4	0	1	Conference co-champions	—
1933	1933	John E. Roberts	–	–	NCAC	3	5	1	2nd	3	1	0	—	—
1934	1934	John E. Roberts	–	–	NCAC	6	2	1	1st	4	0	0	Conference champions	—
1935	1935	George M. Farley	–	–	NCAC	5	3	1	2nd	2	1	1	—	—
1936	1936	Dwight P. Thomas	–	–	NCAC	5	3		2nd	3	1	0	—	—
1937	1937	Dwight P. Thomas	–	–	NCAC	2	5	1	4th	0	3	0	—	—
1938	1938	Dwight P. Thomas	–	–	NCAC	4	4	1	4th	1	2	1	—	—
1939	1939	Dwight P. Thomas	–	–	NCAC	2	7	0	4th	1	3	0	—	—
1940	1940	Dwight P. Thomas	NAIA	–	NCAC	1	7	0	4th	1	3	0	—	—
1941	1941	George M. Farley	NAIA	–	NCAC	2	6	1	3rd	2	2	0	—	—
1942	1942	George M. Farley	NAIA	–	NCAC	6	2	1	2nd	3	1	0	—	—
No team from 1943 to 1944
1945	1945	Allen Stroh	NAIA	–	–	3	2	0	–	–	–	–	—	—
1946	1946	George "Bus" Knight	NAIA	–	NCC	7	0	3	2nd	4	0	2	Playoff berth	—
1947	1947	George "Bus" Knight	NAIA	–	NCC	7	1	1	T-1st	5	1	1	Conference co-champions	—
1948	1948	George "Bus" Knight	NAIA	–	NCC	6	3	0	2nd	5	2	0	—	—
1949	1949	George "Bus" Knight	NAIA	–	NCC	4	5	0	T-4th	4	4	0	—	—
1950	1950	Roy B. Robertson	NAIA	–	NCC	5	5	0	6th	4	3	0	—	—
1951	1951	Roy B. Robertson	NAIA	–	NCC	2	8	0	6th	2	5	0	—	—
1952	1952	Roy B. Robertson	NAIA	–	NCC	5	5	0	T-3rd	4	3	0	—	—
1953	1953	Roy B. Robertson	NAIA	–	NCC	2	4	3	7th	1	4	2	—	—
1954	1954	Keith Skogman	NAIA	–	NCC	3	6	1	6th	2	4	1	—	—
1955	1955	Keith Skogman	NAIA	–	NCC	2	7	1	6th	2	4	1	—	—
1956	1956	Keith Skogman	NAIA	–	NCC	3	7	0	5th	3	4	0	—	—
1957	1957	Keith Skogman	NAIA	–	NCC	3	5	0	T-4th	3	4	0	—	—
1958	1958	Keith Skogman	NAIA	–	NCC	5	4	0	4th	5	3	0	—	—
1959	1959	Keith Skogman	NAIA	–	NCC	5	3	1	5th	4	3	1	—	—
1960	1960	Raymond Westover	NAIA	–	NCC	0	8	0	7th	0	6	0	—	—
1961	1961	Raymond Westover	NAIA	–	NCC	0	9	0	7th	0	6	0	—	—
1962	1962	Raymond Westover	NAIA	–	–	2	4	2	–	–	–	–	—	—
1963	1963	Raymond Westover	NAIA	–	GPCA	7	2	0	1st	3	0	0	Conference champions	—
1964	1964	Raymond Westover	NAIA	–	GPCA	7	1	0	1st	3	0	0	Conference champions	—
1965	1965	Raymond Westover	NAIA	–	–	7	2	0	–	–	–	–	—	—
1966	1966	Raymond Westover	NAIA	–	–	7	2	0	–	–	–	–	—	—
1967	1967	Raymond Westover	NAIA	–	–	5	4	0	–	–	–	–	—	—
1968	1968	Raymond Westover	NAIA	–	–	1	8	0	–	–	–	–	—	—
1969	1969	Harold G. Chaffee	NAIA	–	–	5	4	0	–	–	–	–	—	—
1970	1970	Harold G. Chaffee	NAIA	Division II	NIAC	6	4	0	4th	2	3	0	—	—
1971	1971	Harold G. Chaffee	NAIA	Division II	NIAC	7	2	0	T-2nd	3	2	0	—	—
1972	1972	Harold G. Chaffee	NAIA	Division II	NIAC	4	5	0	4th	2	3	0	—	—
1973	1973	Harold G. Chaffee	NAIA	Division II	NIAC	4	3	1	2nd	3	1	1	—	—
1974	1974	Harold G. Chaffee	NAIA	Division II	NIAC	3	6	0	5th	1	4	0	—	—
1975	1975	Harold G. Chaffee	NAIA	Division II	NIAC	5	5	0	4th	2	3	0	—	—
1976	1976	Harold G. Chaffee	NAIA	Division II	NIAC	6	3	0	T-1st	4	1	0	Conference co-champions	—
1977	1977	Harold G. Chaffee	NAIA	Division II	NIAC	2	7	0	T-4th	2	3	0	—	—
1978	1978	Harold G. Chaffee	NAIA	Division II	NIAC	5	4	0	T-3rd	3	2	0	—	—
1979	1979	Harold G. Chaffee	NAIA	Division II	NIAC	3	5	1	5th	1	3	1	—	—
1980	1980	Harold G. Chaffee	NAIA	Division II	NIAC	3	6	0	T-3rd	2	3	0	—	—
1981	1981	Harold G. Chaffee	NAIA	Division II	NIAC	2	7	0	5th	1	4	0	—	—
1982	1982	Orson Christensen	NAIA	Division II	NIAC	4	5	0	5th	2	3	0	—	—
1983	1983	Orson Christensen	NAIA	Division II	NIAC	7	3	0	T-1st	4	1	0	Conference co-champions	—
1984	1984	Orson Christensen	NAIA	Division II	NIAC	6	4	0	3rd	3	2	0	—	—
1985	1985	Orson Christensen	NAIA	Division II	NIAC	6	5	0	T-3rd	2	3	0	—	—
1986	1986	Orson Christensen	NAIA	Division II	NIAC	6	3	0	1st	5	0	0	Conference champions	—
1987	1987	James Svoboda	NAIA	Division II	NIAC	6	4	0	T-2nd	3	2	0	—	—
1988	1988	James Svoboda	NAIA	Division II	NIAC	7	3	0	1st	5	0	0	Playoff berth	—
1989	1989	James Svoboda	NAIA	Division II	NIAC	10	2	0	1st	5	0	0	Playoff berth	—
1990	1990	James Svoboda	NAIA	Division II	NIAC	7	2	0	T-1st	4	1	0	Conference co-champions	—
1991	1991	James Svoboda	NAIA	Division II	NIAC	8	3	0	2nd	4	1	0	Playoff berth	—
1992	1992	James Svoboda	NAIA	Division II	NIAC	6	3	0	3rd	4	2	0	—	—
1993	1993	James Svoboda	NAIA	Division II	NIAC	7	3	0	3rd	4	2	0	—	—
1994	1994	Steve Standard	NAIA	Division II	NIAC	3	7	0	5th	2	4	0	—	—
1995	1995	Steve Standard	NAIA	Division II	NIAC	3	7	0	6th	2	4	0	—	—
1996	1996	Brian Keller	NAIA	Division II	NIAC	2	8	0	6th	1	5	0	—	—
1997	1997	Brian Keller	NAIA	–	NIAC	5	5	0	T-3rd	4	4	0	—	—
1998	1998	Brian Keller	NAIA	–	NIAC	6	4	0	4th	4	4	0	—	—
1999	1999	Brian Keller	NAIA	–	NIAC	4	6	0	7th	1	5	0	—	—
2000	2000	Brian Keller	NAIA	–	GPAC	8	3	0	1st	6	2	0	Playoff berth	—
2001	2001	Brian Keller	NAIA	–	GPAC	5	5	0	T-5th	3	5	0	—	—
2002	2002	Brian Keller	NAIA	–	GPAC	6	4	0	T-5th	4	4	0	—	—
2003	2003	Brian Keller	NAIA	–	GPAC	6	4	0	T-3rd	6	4	0	—	—
2004	2004	Brian Keller	NAIA	–	GPAC	6	4	0	T-5th	6	4	0	—	—
2005	2005	Brian Keller	NAIA	–	GPAC	5	5	0	5th	5	5	0	—	—
2006	2006	Brian Keller	NAIA	–	GPAC	7	3	0	4th	7	3	0	—	—
2007	2007	Brian Keller	NAIA	–	GPAC	7	3	0	4th	7	3	0	—	—
2008	2008	Brian Keller	NAIA	–	GPAC	7	3	0	T-3rd	7	3	0	—	—
2009	2009	Brian Keller	NAIA	–	GPAC	5	5	0	6th	5	5	0	—	—
2010	2010	Brian Keller	NAIA	–	GPAC	4	6	0	7th	4	6	0	—	—
2011	2011	Brian Keller	NAIA	–	GPAC	5	5	0	7th	4	5	0	—	—
2012	2012	Brian Keller	NAIA	–	GPAC	6	4	0	T-4th	5	4	0	—	—
2013	2013	Brian Keller	NAIA	–	GPAC	6	4	0	4th	6	3	0	—	—
2014	2014	Brian Keller	NAIA	–	GPAC	4	6	0	T-6th	4	5	0	—	—
2015	2015	Brian Keller	NAIA	–	GPAC	4	6	0	7th	3	6	0	—	—
2016	2016	Brian Keller	NCAA	Division III	IIAC	4	6	0	T-5th	3	5	0	—	—
2017	2017	Brian Keller	NCAA	Division III	IIAC	2	8	0	T-7th	2	6	0	—	—
2018	2018	Brian Keller	NCAA	Division III	A-R-C	3	7	0	7th	2	6	0	—	—
2019	2019	Brian Keller	NCAA	Division III	A-R-C	3	7	0	T-7th	1	7	0	—	—
2020–21	2020–21	Brian Keller	NCAA	Division III	A-R-C	0	1	0	T-6th	0	1	0	—	—
2021	2021	Brian Keller	NCAA	Division III	A-R-C	4	6	0	7th	2	6	0	—	—
2022	2022	Brian Keller	NCAA	Division III	A-R-C	1	9	0	9th	0	8	0	—	—
2023	2023	Brian Keller	NCAA	Division III	A-R-C	4	6	0	T–6th	2	6	0	—	—
2024	2024	Brian Keller	NCAA	Division III	A-R-C	3	7	0	T–6th	2	6	0	—	—
2024	2024	Brian Keller	NCAA	Division III	A-R-C	1	9	0	8th	1	7	0	—	—
