= 2021 Simon Fraser football team =

American college football season

2021 Simon Fraser football
- Conference: Great Northwest Athletic Conference
- Record: 1–7 (0–4 GNAC)
- Head coach: Mike Rigell (interim; 1st season)
- Co-offensive coordinator: Dan Dorazio (1st season)
- Offensive scheme: Multiple
- Defensive coordinator: Jerome Erdman (1st season)
- Base defense: Multiple
- Home stadium: Terry Fox Field

2021 Great Northwest Athletic Conference football standings
	Conf.			Overall
Team	W		L	W		L
Central Washington $^	4	–	0	8	–	3
Western Oregon	2	–	2	4	–	6
Simon Fraser	0	–	4	1	–	7
$ – Conference champion; ^ – NCAA Division II playoff participant; Rankings from AFCA Poll

The 2021 Simon Fraser football team represented Simon Fraser University (SFU) in the 2021 NCAA Division II football season as a member of the Great Northwest Athletic Conference (GNAC). The team played its home game at Terry Fox Field in Burnaby, British Columbia. The team finished the season with an overall record of 1–7, going 0–4 in GNAC play. Simon Fraser was led by interim head coach Mike Rigell in his first season as the program's coach. On November 30, the university announced that Rigell would become the program's full-time head coach.

The university's athletic teams previously used the name "Clan" and were commonly known as the "Clansmen"; the university retired those names in 2020. Until a new name was picked, the athletic teams competed simply as "Simon Fraser" or "SFU". On September 6, 2022, the university revealed that the athletic teams would now be known as the "Red Leafs". The name was chosen after university officials consulted with several student groups and members from nine Indigenous Host Nations.

== Preseason ==
=== GNAC poll ===
The GNAC preseason prediction poll was released on August 10, 2021. Simon Fraser was predicted to finish 3rd (last) in the conference.

== Schedule ==
The game against Texas–Permian Basin was cancelled due to international travel restrictions on the US–Canada border relating to the COVID-19 pandemic.

Date	Time	Opponent	Site	TV	Result	Attendance
September 4	1:00 p.m.	at Idaho*	Kibbie Dome; Moscow, ID	ESPN+	L 0–68	5,214
September 11	1:00 p.m.	at No. 12 (Div. III) Linfield*	Memorial Stadium; McMinnville, OR		L 20–56	2,504
September 18	6:00 p.m.	Central Washington	Terry Fox Field; Burnaby, BC		L 14–36	1,200
September 25	6:00 p.m.	Western Oregon	Terry Fox Field; Burnaby, BC		L 7–24	1,296
October 2	6:00 p.m.	UT Permian Basin*	Terry Fox Field; Burnaby, BC		No contest	
October 16	12:00 p.m.	at Montana State–Northern*	Tilleman Field; Havre, MT		W 30–3	1,000
October 23	4:00 p.m.	at Angelo State*	LeGrand Sports Complex; San Angelo, TX		L 10–51	3,310
October 30	1:00 p.m.	at Western Oregon	McArthur Field; Monmouth, OR		L 3–42	1,578
November 13	1:00 p.m.	at Central Washington	Tomlinson Stadium; Ellensburg, WA		L 0–70	3,961
*Non-conference game; Rankings from AFCA Poll released prior to the game; All times are in Pacific time

== Personnel ==
=== Coaching staff ===
Name	Position	Year at Simon Fraser
Mike Rigell	Interim head coach Offensive coordinator	1st
Dan Dorazio	Co-offensive coordinator Offensive line	1st
Jerome Erdman	Defensive coordinator Linebackers	1st
Wayne Dickens	Special teams coordinator Defensive line Recruiting coordinator	1st
Michael Spencer	Running backs	1st
Jay Prepchuk	Quarterbacks	1st
Cory Doughman	Linebackers	1st
Marcus Grandison	Co-offensive pass game coordinator Cornerbacks	1st
Michael Beck	Assistant offensive line	1st
Jon Klyne	Receivers	1st

=== Roster ===
2021 Simon Fraser football team roster
Quarterbacks: 2 Brandon Niksich – sophomore (6'5, 195); 12 Luke Duxbury – freshman (6'0, 175); 15 Key'Shaun Dorsey – freshman (6'0, 200); 16 Justin Seiber – sophomore (6'2, 185); 18 Richard Lugumire – freshman (6'1, 190); Running backs: 20 Paul Thomas – junior (5'9, 190); 23 Somto Anyadike – junior (5'11, 210); 26 Mason Glover – junior (5'9, 200); 27 Paolo Lujan – junior (5'10, 205); 30 Jordan Sims – freshman (6'0, 195); 35 Mansur Sarvari – freshman (6'1, 205); James Nibbs – (redshirt) (6'0, 215); Wide receivers: 6 Riley Morrison – sophomore (5'8, 165); 11 Robert Meadors – junior (6'2, 190); 13 Ryan Naylor – sophomore (6'3, 200); 14 Nate Hunt – sophomore (6'3, 200); 17 Ethan Flynn – freshman (6'1, 195); 36 Jean-Oliver Pitte – freshman (5'11, 180); 46 Michael Dinoto – freshman (6'0, 175); 74 Jacob Pohl – freshman (6'3, 205); 82 Sam Davenport – freshman (6'1, 185); 83 Aidan Pearce – junior (6'1, 190); 84 Dallas Dixon – senior (6'4, 185); 85 Brandon Johnson – freshman (6'1, 190); 86 Andrew Hunt – freshman (6'4, 190); 89 Caelin Johnson – freshman (6'2, 181); Joe Lucas – (redshirt) (6'0, 170); Tight ends: 47 Brandon Fuchs – freshman (6'5, 235); 80 Ethan Janto – (redshirt) freshman (6'4, 230); 81 Dylan McBratney – freshman (6'4, 230)	Offensive linemen: 56 Kai Tinker – freshman (6'1, 270); 60 Connor Burns – freshman (6'4, 285); 61 Nolan Finn – freshman (6'3, 275); 62 Jacob Anderson – freshman (6'5, 290); 64 Anthony Bolaños – freshman (5'11, 255); 66 Christian Butenschoen – sophomore (6'3, 290); 69 Scott Maki – senior (6'4, 305); 70 Reuben Buchanan – sophomore (6'1, 285); 73 Aidan Corning – freshman (6'5, 285); 75 Mark Ruby – sophomore (6'0, 265); 77 Maliq Washington – freshman (5'11, 260); 87 Dakota Lepine – freshman (6'3, 250); Defensive linemen: 40 Isaac Evans – senior (6'3, 240); 42 Jakob Mozill – junior (6'2, 220); 44 Evan Noli – sophomore (6'2, 260); 50 Ishmael Togi – freshman (5'11, 280); 54 Tank Brewster – freshman (6'2, 265); 65 Luca Iallonardo – freshman (6'3, 270); 72 Vishaan Narayan – freshman (6'2, 285); 90 Nate Gonzalez – freshman (6'3, 240); 91 Aidan Estabrooks – freshman (6'2, 270); 93 Lorenzo Brannon – freshman (6'0, 275); 97 Jeremiah Famor – junior (6'0, 260); 99 Devin Pott – junior (6'6, 235)	Linebackers: 9 Drew Nicholson – sophomore (6'2, 230); 21 Jacob Wade – sophomore (5'11, 200); 33 Griffin Barrett – senior (5'11, 230); 45 Dayton Ingenhaag – freshman (6'0, 220); 49 Isaac Muckian – junior (6'0, 205); 52 Justice Kremler – senior (5'11, 220); 53 Hayden Santsche – sophomore (6'2, 205); 58 Nicolas Klingshirn – freshman (6'2, 225); Defensive backs: 1 Gideone Kremler – freshman (6'0, 180); 3 Brendan Lowry – senior (5'10, 190); 4 Khaleeb Webb – junior (5'10, 185); 5 Damon Lynch – junior (5'10, 185); 8 Jerrell Cummings – sophomore (5'10, 185); 10 Evan Currie – sophomore (6'3, 165); 19 Kimo Hiu – freshman (5'10, 190); 24 Jaden Severy – freshman (6'1, 185); 25 Johari Hastings – freshman (5'10, 185); 28 Kyle Huish – freshman (5'9, 180); 29 Kolby Buljevic – junior (6'1, 195); 31 Haydn Stomperud – freshman (5'10, 170); 32 Joshua Phillips Verdugo – junior (5'10, 180); 37 Emmanuel Adegboyega – freshman (6'2, 180); 38 Riley Berfelo – freshman (5'10, 185); 39 Antonio Cusati – freshman (6'0, 175); 41 Drew Lirag – freshman (5'11, 180); Special teams: 4 Ethan Beselt – senior (5'9, 185) RS; 48 Kees Metselaar – senior (6'3, 235) P/K; 82 Sam Davenport – freshman (6'1, 185) P; 88 Kristie Elliott – sophomore (5'8, 140) K

== Game summaries ==
=== At Idaho ===
Simon Fraser at Idaho Vandals – Game summary

Quarter	1	2	3	4	Total
Simon Fraser	0	0	0	0	0
Vandals	21	19	21	7	68

at Kibbie Dome, Moscow, Idaho

- Date: September 4
- Game time: 1:00 p.m. PDT
- Game weather: None (played indoors)
- Game attendance: 5,214
- Referee: Jeff Rink
- TV: ESPN+
- Box score, Recap

Game information
First quarter
- IDHO – C. J. Jordan 21-yard run (Logan Prescott kick), 13:21. Vandals 7–0. Drive: 6 plays, 53 yards, 1:37.
- IDHO – Roshaun Johnson 6-yard run (Logan Prescott kick), 4:04. Vandals 14–0. Drive: 4 plays, 67 yards, 1:39.
- IDHO – Elisha Cummings 6-yard run (Logan Prescott kick), 0:02. Vandals 21–0. Drive: 6 plays, 66 yards, 2:12.

Second quarter

- IDHO – Sam Davenport tackled in end zone, 13:02. Vandals 23–0.
- IDHO – Roshaun Johnson 37-yard run (Logan Prescott kick), 12:19. Vandals 30–0. Drive: 2 plays, 40 yards, 0:36.
- IDHO – Logan Prescott 21-yard field goal, 8:47. Vandals 33–0. Drive: 5 plays, 42 yards, 1:08.
- IDHO – Roshaun Johnson 4-yard run (Logan Prescott kick), 0:38. Vandals 40–0. Drive: 8 plays, 31 yards, 2:40.

Third quarter

- IDHO – Connor Whitney 4-yard pass from C. J. Jordan (Logan Prescott kick), 10:21. Vandals 47–0. Drive: 8 plays, 44 yards, 3:01.
- IDHO – Aundre Carter 1-yard run (Logan Prescott kick), 6:24. Vandals 54–0. Drive: 6 plays, 21 yards, 3:13.
- IDHO – Hayden Hatten 71-yard pass from C. J. Jordan (Logan Prescott kick), 1:30. Vandals 61–0. Drive: 1 play, 71 yards, 0:11.

Fourth quarter

- IDHO – Khalil Forehand 8-yard run (Logan Prescott kick), 8:12. Vandals 68–0. Drive: 7 plays, 58 yards, 3:00.

Statistics	SFU	IDHO
First downs	9	30
Total yards	127	593
Rushing yards	50	316
Passing yards	77	277
Turnovers	1	2
Time of possession	32:55	27:03

Team	Category	Player	Statistics
Simon Fraser	Passing	Brandon Niksich	9/16, 77 yards, INT
Simon Fraser	Rushing	Mason Glover	16 rushes, 34 yards
Simon Fraser	Receiving	Dallas Dixon	4 receptions, 37 yards
Idaho	Passing	C. J. Jordan	7/12, 161 yards, 2 TD
Idaho	Rushing	Roshaun Johnson	10 rushes, 87 yards, 3 TD
Idaho	Receiving	Hayden Hatten	2 receptions, 106 yards, TD

=== At No. 12 (Div. III) Linfield ===
Simon Fraser at No. 13 (Div. III) Linfield Wildcats – Game summary

Quarter	1	2	3	4	Total
Simon Fraser	0	7	0	13	20
No. 12 (Div. III) Wildcats	10	15	31	0	56

at Memorial Stadium, McMinnville, Oregon

- Date: September 11
- Game time: 1:00 p.m. PDT
- Game weather: Sunny
- Game attendance: 2,504
- Referee: Jeff Davis
- Box score, Recap

Game information
First quarter
- LIN – Andrew Starkel 38-yard field goal, 7:48. Wildcats 3–0. Drive: 6 plays, 13 yards, 2:57.
- LIN – Connor Morton 21-yard run (Andrew Starkel kick), 5:17. Wildcats 10–0. Drive: 3 plays, 35 yards, 1:25.

Second quarter

- LIN – Connor McNabb 9-yard pass from Wyatt Smith (Jayden Wilson run), 13:57. Wildcats 18–0. Drive: 5 plays, 47 yards, 1:43.
- LIN – Devon Murray 31-yard pass from Wyatt Smith (Andrew Starkel kick), 5:24. Wildcats 25–0. Drive: 8 plays, 78 yards, 3:27.
- SFU – Caelin Johnson 1-yard pass from Justin Seiber (Kristie Elliott kick), 0:16. Wildcats 25–7. Drive: 13 plays, 78 yards, 5:03.

Third quarter

- LIN – Jon Sedy 32-yard interception return (Andrew Starkel kick), 14:11. Wildcats 32–7.
- LIN – Joel Valadez 42-yard pass from Wyatt Smith (Andrew Starkel kick), 12:09. Wildcats 39–7. Drive: 1 play, 42 yards, 0:11.
- LIN – Andrew Starkel 34-yard field goal, 9:19. Wildcats 42–7. Drive: 7 plays, 46 yards, 1:22.
- LIN – Joel Valadez 10-yard pass from Wyatt Smith (Andrew Starkel kick), 4:31. Wildcats 49–7. Drive: 9 plays, 69 yards, 3:24.
- LIN – Spencer Lee 15-yard run (Andrew Starkel kick), 0:00. Wildcats 56–7. Drive: 7 plays, 48 yards, 3:18.

Fourth quarter

- SFU – Caelin Johnson 63-yard pass from Justin Seiber (kick failed), 5:03. Wildcats 56–13. Drive: 1 play, 63 yards, 0:11.
- SFU – Caelin Johnson 11-yard pass from Justin Seiber (Kristie Elliott kick), 1:00. Wildcats 56–20. Drive: 7 plays, 66 yards, 1:38.

Statistics	SFU	LIN
First downs	18	25
Total yards	346	472
Rushing yards	13	159
Passing yards	333	313
Turnovers	2	0
Time of possession	30:53	29:07

Team	Category	Player	Statistics
Simon Fraser	Passing	Justin Seiber	26/43, 297 yards, 3 TD, INT
Simon Fraser	Rushing	Justin Seiber	2 rushes, 8 yards
Simon Fraser	Receiving	Caelin Johnson	9 receptions, 193 yards, 3 TD
Linfield	Passing	Wyatt Smith	26/39, 307 yards, 4 TD
Linfield	Rushing	Connor McNabb	9 rushes, 73 yards
Linfield	Receiving	Joel Valadez	4 receptions, 96 yards, 2 TD

Simon Fraser kicker Kristie Elliott became the first female player in Canadian college football history to both play and score in a game.

=== Central Washington ===
Central Washington Wildcats at Simon Fraser – Game summary

Quarter	1	2	3	4	Total
Wildcats	8	7	7	14	36
Simon Fraser	7	7	0	0	14

at Terry Fox Field, Burnaby, British Columbia

- Date: September 18
- Game time: 6:00 p.m. PDT
- Game weather: Clear, 16 °C (61 °F)
- Game attendance: 1,200
- Referee: Wane Dallosto
- Box score, Recap

Game information
First quarter
- CWU – Rashaad Boddie 4-yard run (J. J. Lemming pass to Isaac Crichton), 12:29. Wildcats 8–0. Drive: 7 plays, 38 yards, 1:48.
- SFU – Robert Meadors 12-yard pass from Justin Seiber (Kristie Elliott kick), 2:15. Wildcats 8–7. Drive: 2 plays, 12 yards, 0:12.

Second quarter

- SFU – Mason Glover 18-yard run (Kristie Elliott kick), 12:19. Simon Fraser 14–8. Drive: 6 plays, 71 yards, 2:31.
- CWU – Tony Archie 36-yard pass from Quincey Glasper (Patrick Hegarty kick), 10:42. Wildcats 15–14. Drive: 4 plays, 44 yards, 2:56.

Third quarter

- CWU – Rashaad Boddie 28-yard run (Patrick Hegarty kick), 11:54. Wildcats 22–14. Drive: 7 plays, 77 yards, 2:56.

Fourth quarter

- CWU – Cameron Daniels 1-yard run (Patrick Hegarty kick), 9:01. Wildcats 29–14. Drive: 11 plays, 56 yards, 5:59.
- CWU – Rashaad Boddie 87-yard run (Patrick Hegarty kick), 1:59. Wildcats 36–14. Drive: 3 plays, 90 yards, 1:01.

Statistics	CWU	SFU
First downs	27	16
Total yards	570	343
Rushing yards	370	58
Passing yards	200	285
Turnovers	3	3
Time of possession	33:16	26:44

Team	Category	Player	Statistics
Central Washington	Passing	J. J. Lemming	14/31, 147 yards, INT
Central Washington	Rushing	Rashaad Boddie	25 rushes, 279 yards, 3 TD
Central Washington	Receiving	Tony Archie	4 receptions, 71 yards, TD
Simon Fraser	Passing	Justin Seiber	23/50, 285 yards, TD, INT
Simon Fraser	Rushing	Mason Glover	4 rushes, 23 yards, TD
Simon Fraser	Receiving	Riley Morrison	9 receptions, 76 yards

=== Western Oregon ===
Western Oregon Wolves at Simon Fraser – Game summary

Quarter	1	2	3	4	Total
Wolves	0	7	7	10	24
Simon Fraser	0	0	7	0	7

at Terry Fox Field, Burnaby, British Columbia

- Date: September 25
- Game time: 6:00 p.m. PDT
- Game attendance: 1,296
- Referee: M. Livingston
- Box score, Recap

Game information
First quarter
- No scoring plays

Second quarter

- WOU – Omari Land 1-yard run (Danny Cossette kick), 3:22. Wolves 7–0. Drive: 13 plays, 84 yards, 5:57.

Third quarter

- WOU – Omari Land 42-yard run (Danny Cossete kick), 14:37. Wolves 14–0. Drive: 1 play, 42 yards, 0:10.
- SFU – Dallas Dixon 45-yard pass from Justin Seiber (Kristie Elliott kick), 14:30. Wolves 14–7. Drive: 1 play, 45 yards, 0:07.

Fourth quarter

- WOU – Danny Cossette 24-yard field goal, 11:08. Wolves 17–7. Drive: 9 plays, 24 yards, 3:39.
- WOU – Damon Hickok 1-yard run (Danny Cossette kick), 2:43. Wolves 24–7. Drive: 12 plays, 99 yards, 6:21.

Statistics	WOU	SFU
First downs	25	10
Total yards	412	184
Rushing yards	330	25
Passing yards	87	202
Turnovers	1	1
Time of possession	35:29	24:31

Team	Category	Player	Statistics
Western Oregon	Passing	Ryan Worthley	14/27, 87 yards
Western Oregon	Rushing	Omari Land	25 rushes, 209 yards, 2 TD
Western Oregon	Receiving	Andrew Valladares	1 reception, 22 yards
Simon Fraser	Passing	Justin Seiber	19/33, 202 yards, TD
Simon Fraser	Rushing	Justin Seiber	3 rushes, 18 yards
Simon Fraser	Receiving	Dallas Dixon	2 receptions, 60 yards, TD

=== At Montana State–Northern ===
Simon Fraser at Montana State–Northern Lights – Game summary

Quarter	1	2	3	4	Total
Simon Fraser	6	17	0	7	30
Lights	3	0	0	0	3

at Tilleman Field, Havre, Montana

- Date: October 16
- Game time: 12:00 p.m. PDT/1:00 p.m. MDT
- Game attendance: 1,000
- Box score, Recap

Game information
First quarter
- MSUN – Sawyer Zook 38-yard field goal, 7:09. Lights 3–0. Drive: 2 plays, -12 yards, 1:15.
- SFU – Riley Morrison 27-yard pass from Justin Seiber (kick failed), 1:22. Simon Fraser 6–3. Drive: 4 plays, 26 yards, 0:54.

Second quarter

- SFU – Isaac Muckian 0-yard fumble return (Kristie Elliott kick), 14:51. Simon Fraser 13–3.
- SFU – Kristie Elliott 23-yard field goal, 5:47. Simon Fraser 16–3. Drive: 10 plays, 44 yards, 6:54.
- SFU – Drew Nicholson 28-yard interception return (Kristie Elliott kick), 5:04. Simon Fraser 23–3.

Third quarter

- No scoring plays

Fourth quarter

- SFU – Aidan Pearce 63-yard pass from Justin Seiber (Kristie Elliott kick), 4:14. Simon Fraser 30–3. Drive: 2 plays, 68 yards, 0:53.

Statistics	SFU	MSUN
First downs	17	13
Total yards	289	266
Rushing yards	100	158
Passing yards	213	119
Turnovers	5	6
Time of possession	28:53	31:01

Team	Category	Player	Statistics
Simon Fraser	Passing	Justin Seiber	12/30, 190 yards, 2 TD, 3 INT
Simon Fraser	Rushing	Somto Anyadike	13 rushes, 77 yards
Simon Fraser	Receiving	Riley Morrison	5 receptions, 81 yards, TD
Montana State–Northern	Passing	Devonte Armstro	11/33, 119 yards, 4 INT
Montana State–Northern	Rushing	Izayah Boss	26 rushes, 95 yards
Montana State–Northern	Receiving	Levi Keltner	4 receptions, 68 yards

=== At Angelo State ===
Simon Fraser at Angelo State Rams – Game summary

Quarter	1	2	3	4	Total
Simon Fraser	0	3	7	0	10
Rams	15	8	14	14	51

at LeGrand Sports Complex, San Angelo, Texas

- Date: October 23
- Game time: 4:00 p.m. PDT/6:00 p.m. CDT
- Game weather: Sunny
- Game attendance: 3,310
- Referee: Jarvis Walker
- Box score, Recap

Game information
First quarter
- ASU – Nathaniel Omayebu III 6-yard run (Asa Fuller kick), 11:53. Rams 7–0. Drive: 5 plays, 42 yards, 1:43.
- ASU – Alfred Grear 46-yard run (Zach Bronkhorst pass to Matthew Carter), 4:03. Rams 15–0. Drive: 1 play, 46 yards, 0:08.

Second quarter

- SFU – Kristie Elliott 30-yard field goal, 6:31. Rams 15–3. Drive: 11 plays, 40 yards, 5:08.
- ASU – Kees Metselaar tackled in end zone, 2:02. Rams 17–3.
- ASU – Alfred Grear 90-yard kickoff return (kick failed), 1:50. Rams 23–3.

Third quarter

- ASU – Zach Bronkhorst 1-yard run (Asa Fuller kick), 6:58. Rams 30–3. Drive: 8 plays, 55 yards, 3:30.
- SFU – Robert Meadors 13-yard pass from Justin Seiber (Kristie Elliott kick), 2:37. Rams 30–10. Drive: 8 plays, 75 yards, 4:21.
- ASU – Kellen Pachot 34-yard pass from Zach Bronkhorst (Asa Fuller kick), 0:00. Rams 37–10. Drive: 6 plays, 66 yards, 2:35.

Fourth quarter

- ASU – Nathaniel Omayebu III 3-yard run (Asa Fuller kick), 10:12. Rams 44–10. Drive: 6 plays, 91 yards, 2:31.
- ASU – Andrew Pitts 45-yard interception return (Asa Fuller kick), 8:28. Rams 51–10.

Statistics	SFU	ASU
First downs	10	19
Total yards	190	461
Rushing yards	39	282
Passing yards	151	179
Turnovers	3	1
Time of possession	31:26	26:44

Team	Category	Player	Statistics
Simon Fraser	Passing	Justin Seiber	15/24, 136 yards, TD, 2 INT
Simon Fraser	Rushing	Somto Anyadike	15 rushes, 44 yards
Simon Fraser	Receiving	Riley Morrison	8 receptions, 46 yards
Angelo State	Passing	Zach Bronkhorst	11/16, 122 yards, TD, INT
Angelo State	Rushing	Nathaniel Omayebu III	15 rushes, 112 yards, 2 TD
Angelo State	Receiving	Kellen Pachot	5 receptions, 75 yards, TD

=== At Western Oregon ===
Simon Fraser at Western Oregon Wolves – Game summary

Quarter	1	2	3	4	Total
Simon Fraser	0	3	0	0	3
Wolves	7	20	15	0	42

at McArthur Field, Monmouth, Oregon

- Date: October 30
- Game time: 1:00 p.m. PDT
- Game attendance: 1,578
- Referee: Wane Dallosto
- Box score, Recap

Game information
First quarter
- WOU – Gannon Winker 31-yard run (Danny Cossette kick), 10:07. Wolves 7–0. Drive: 5 plays, 69 yards, 2:31.

Second quarter

- WOU – Damon Hickock 3-yard pass from Ryan Worthley (kick failed), 14:12. Wolves 13–0. Drive: 13 plays, 72 yards, 6:34.
- WOU – Omari Land 10-yard run (kick failed), 11:39. Wolves 19–0. Drive: 4 plays, 31 yards, 1:41.
- SFU – Kristie Elliott 28-yard field goal, 4:21. Wolves 19–3. Drive: 13 plays, 74 yards, 4:30.
- WOU – Thomas Wright 15-yard pass from Ryan Worthley (Ryan Worthley pass to Damon Hickock), 2:10. Wolves 27–3. Drive: 4 plays, 28 yards, 2:04.

Third quarter

- WOU – Thomas Wright 18-yard pass from Ryan Worthley (Gannon Winker run), 9:18. Wolves 35–3. Drive: 10 plays, 71 yards, 5:38.
- WOU – Austin Goldstein 1-yard pass from Ryan Worthley (Tanner Shattuck kick), 1:43. Wolves 42–3. Drive: 8 plays, 68 yards, 4:39.

Fourth quarter

- No scoring plays

Statistics	SFU	WOU
First downs	10	28
Total yards	122	423
Rushing yards	27	297
Passing yards	95	126
Turnovers	1	0
Time of possession	23:56	36:04

Team	Category	Player	Statistics
Simon Fraser	Passing	Justin Seiber	8/19, 68 yards, INT
Simon Fraser	Rushing	Somto Anyadike	7 rushes, 24 yards
Simon Fraser	Receiving	Robert Meadors	3 receptions, 36 yards
Western Oregon	Passing	Ryan Worthley	8/11, 74 yards, 3 TD
Western Oregon	Rushing	Omari Land	20 rushes, 133 yards, TD
Western Oregon	Receiving	Thomas Wright	3 receptions, 40 yards, 2 TD

=== At Central Washington ===
Simon Fraser at Central Washington Wildcats – Game summary

Quarter	1	2	3	4	Total
Simon Fraser	0	0	0	0	0
Wildcats	28	28	7	7	70

at Kibbie Dome, Moscow, Idaho

- Date: November 13
- Game time: 1:00 p.m. PST
- Game weather: Overcast, 49 °F (9 °C)
- Game attendance: 3,961
- Referee: Michael Livings
- Recap, Recap

Game information
First quarter
- CWU – Quincy Glasper 14-yard run (Patrick Hegarty kick), 12:13. Wildcats 7–0. Drive: 5 plays, 29 yards, 1:40.
- CWU – Daeon Hudson 61-yard interception return (run failed), 8:31. Wildcats 13–0.
- CWU – Daniel Johnson 41-yard pass from Quincy Glasper (Quincy Glasper pass to Tyler Flanagan), 3:42. Wildcats 21–0. Drive: 7 plays, 67 yards, 2:43.
- CWU – Quincy Glasper 18-yard run (Patrick Hegarty kick), 0:30. Wildcats 28–0. Drive: 7 plays, 63 yards, 1:53.

Second quarter

- CWU – Patrick Rogers 71-yard interception return (Patrick Hegarty kick), 11:26. Wildcats 35–0.
- CWU – Samuel Sanchez 5-yard pass from Quincy Glasper (Patrick Hegarty kick), 6:54. Wildcats 42–0. Drive: 10 plays, 83 yards, 3:26.
- CWU – Darius Morrison 53-yard pass from Quincy Glasper (Patrick Hegarty kick), 2:47. Wildcats 49–0. Drive: 3 plays, 50 yards, 1:43.
- CWU – Tai-John Mizutani 12-yard pass from Quincy Glasper (Patrick Hegarty kick), 0:20. Wildcats 56–0. Drive: 3 plays, 48 yards, 0:29.

Third quarter

- CWU – Tyler Flanagan 22-yard pass from Quincy Glasper (Patrick Hegarty kick), 9:52. Wildcats 63–0. Drive: 10 plays, 78 yards, 5:08.

Fourth quarter

- CWU – J. J. Lemming 5-yard run (Patrick Hegarty kick), 13:52. Wildcats 70–0. Drive: 8 plays, 41 yards, 3:24.

Statistics	SFU	CWU
First downs	8	31
Total yards	131	513
Rushing yards	51	215
Passing yards	80	298
Turnovers	4	1
Time of possession	26:43	33:17

Team	Category	Player	Statistics
Simon Fraser	Passing	Justin Seiber	6/16, 41 yards, 2 INT
Simon Fraser	Rushing	Paul Thomas	6 rushes, 21 yards
Simon Fraser	Receiving	Sam Davenport	2 receptions, 27 yards
Central Washington	Passing	Quincy Glasper	19/26, 292 yards, 5 TD
Central Washington	Rushing	Tyler Flanagan	12 rushes, 64 yards
Central Washington	Receiving	Darius Morrison	6 receptions, 122 yards, TD
