= 2021 UT Permian Basin Falcons football team =

American college football season

2021 UT Permian Basin Falcons football

Heritage Bowl, L 21–24 vs. Oklahoma Baptist
- Conference: Lone Star Conference
- Record: 5–6 (3–4 LSC)
- Head coach: Justin Carrigan (6th season)
- Offensive scheme: Spread
- Co-defensive coordinators: Chris Mineo (6th season); Jacob Martin (6th season)
- Base defense: 3–4
- Home stadium: Ratliff Stadium; Grande Communications Stadium

2021 Lone Star Conference football standings
	Conf.			Overall
Team	W		L	W		L
Midwestern State $	6	–	1	7	–	3
No. 11 Angelo State ^	5	–	2	11	–	3
West Texas A&M	5	–	2	7	–	4
Texas A&M–Commerce	5	–	2	7	–	4
Texas A&M–Kingsville	3	–	4	5	–	5
UT Permian Basin #	3	–	4	5	–	6
Eastern New Mexico	1	–	6	3	–	7
Western New Mexico	0	–	7	1	–	9
$ – Conference champion; ^ – NCAA Division II playoff participant; # – Heritage Bowl participant; Rankings from AFCA Poll

The 2021 UT Permian Basin Falcons football team represented the University of Texas Permian Basin (UTPB) in the 2021 NCAA Division II football season as a member of the Lone Star Conference (LSC). The Falcons were led by sixth-year head coach Justin Carrigan. The Falcons played their home games at Ratliff Stadium in Odessa, Texas, with one home game played at Grande Communications Stadium in Midland.

The Falcons were invited to the Heritage Bowl, losing 21–24 to Oklahoma Baptist. It was the first post-season game for both programs.

== Preseason ==
=== LSC media poll ===
In the LSC's preseason poll, the Falcons were predicted to finish tied for fourth in the conference and received five first-place votes.

== Schedule ==
The Falcons' 2021 regular season schedule consisted of five home games and five away games. The Falcons hosted LSC foes West Texas A&M, Eastern New Mexico (at Grande Communications Stadium), and Texas A&M–Kingsville and traveled to Western New Mexico, Angelo State, Texas A&M–Commerce, and Midwestern State.

The Falcons hosted non-conference foe Lincoln (CA), an independent program, and traveled to Southwest Baptist from the Great Lakes Valley Conference and Abilene Christian from the Western Athletic Conference. UTPB was scheduled to play at Simon Fraser in Burnaby, British Columbia, but the game was cancelled due to international travel restrictions on the US–Canada border relating to the pandemic.

Date	Time	Opponent	Site	Result	Attendance
September 4	12:00 p.m.	at Southwest Baptist*	Plaster Stadium; Bolivar, MO	W 24–16	3,000
September 11	6:00 p.m.	West Texas A&M	Ratliff Stadium; Odessa, TX	W 42–31	5,771
September 18	6:00 p.m.	at Abilene Christian*	Wildcat Stadium; Abilene, TX	L 9–34	9,018
September 25	7:30 p.m.	at Western New Mexico	Altamirano Stadium; Silver City, NM	W 27–19	650
October 2		at Simon Fraser*	Terry Fox Field; Burnaby, BC	No contest	
October 9	6:00 p.m.	Lincoln (CA)*	Ratliff Stadium; Odessa, TX	W 75–0	3,560
October 16	6:00 p.m.	at Angelo State	LeGrand Sports Complex; San Angelo, TX	L 14–34	4,873
October 23	6:00 p.m.	Eastern New Mexico^{†}	Grande Communications Stadium; Midland, TX	W 44–21	4,280
October 30	4:00 p.m.	at Texas A&M–Commerce	Memorial Stadium; Commerce, TX	L 0–41	4,827
November 6	2:00 p.m.	Texas A&M–Kingsville	Ratliff Stadium; Odessa, TX	L 22–29	3,255
November 13	1:00 p.m.	at Midwestern State	Memorial Stadium; Wichita Falls, TX	L 30–36	7,222
December 4	12:00 p.m.	vs. Oklahoma Baptist*	Tiger Stadium; Corsicana, TX (Heritage Bowl)	L 21–24	3,576
*Non-conference game; ^{†}Homecoming; All times are in Central time

Schedule source:

== Roster ==
2021 UT Permian Basin Falcons football team roster
Players
Coaches
Offense

Pos.	#	Name	Class
WR	2	Kobe Robinson	Jr
WR	5	MJ Link	Jr
RB	6	Adrian Walker	Jr
WR	9	Baylon Ware	Jr
WR	10	Jordan Smart	Fr
QB	11	Clayton Roberts	Jr
QB	12	Suddin Sapien	Fr
WR	13	Grant Brown	So
RB	15	Taj Crenshaw	Fr
QB	15	Wes Jones	Fr
QB	16	Tyler Townley	Fr
RB	20	Kevin Young Jr.	Fr
RB	22	Jayvon Davis	Fr
RB	25	Corey Johnson	Fr
RB	25	Kenneth Walker	Fr
RB	26	Kory Harris	Fr
WR	27	Clyde Bellow	Fr
RB	33	Nathan Tilford	Jr
RB	35	Ed Williams	Fr
TE	45	Matt Zubiate	Jr
TE	46	Jaylon Banks	Fr
RB	47	Jacob Olivares	Fr
TE	48	Rylan Meek	Fr
OL	51	Heston Edwards	Fr
OL	52	William Draker	So
OL	54	Hunter Hickock	Sr
OL	55	Austin LaFavers	Fr
OL	60	Derrick Assad	So
OL	61	Noah Issa	Fr
OL	63	Ivan Pena	Jr
OL	65	Dawson Reynolds	Fr
OL	67	Pessi Savea	Jr
OL	70	Greg Chmielewski	Fr
OL	71	Joseph Mueller	Fr
OL	73	Matt Groeschel	Fr
OL	74	Zach Burns	Fr
OL	75	Ovidio Melendez	Jr
OL	77	Ramon Diaz	Fr
OL	78	Dakari White	Fr
OL	79	Ryan Wilson	Sr
WR	80	Kwade Hegtvedt	Fr
WR	80	Marcus Molina	Fr
WR	81	Caleb Camarillo	Fr
WR	81	Ethan Leyva	Fr
WR	82	Gunnar Abseck	Fr
WR	83	Donta Hayes	Fr
WR	83	Jonathan Jean	Fr
WR	85	Shemar Davis	Fr
TE	86	Jeremiah Venson	Fr
WR	87	Braylon Monroe	Fr
WR	88	Mike Evans	Fr
WR	89	Michael Islas	Fr
TE	89	Brock Johnson	Fr
WR		Ty'Dedrick Anderson	Fr

Defense

Pos.	#	Name	Class
LB	0	Miquon Mayes	Jr
DB	1	Donta Stuart	So
DB	3	Nygel King	Sr
DB	4	JT Walker	Jr
DL	5	La'Daidreain Glasker	Sr
DB	7	D'Ondre Robinson	Sr
DB	8	Levon Barnett	Jr
DL	9	EJ Gisa	Sr
LB	14	Derrian Forge	Jr
DB	16	Trent Ward	Jr
DB	18	Octavius Spencer	Sr
DB	19	Chanlor Johnson	Fr
DB	21	Jaques Tyler	So
DB	23	Kamren Amao	Fr
DL	24	Marquez Byrd	Sr
LB	25	John O'Kelly	Jr
DB	26	Wayne Landry	Fr
LB	27	Coltin Locking	Fr
DB	28	Zephaniah Nelson	Fr
LB	28	Jamil Pittman	So
DB	29	Ashton Levells	Fr
DB	29	Xavier Phoenix	Fr
LB	30	Dorian Anderson	Fr
DB	32	Dawson Burton	Fr
LB	34	Jalon Rocquemore	Fr
DB	36	Jalen Thompson	Fr
LB	38	Ty Johnson	Fr
LB	39	Cameron Bradley	Fr
DB	39	Christian Islas	Fr
LB	40	Courtney Massingill	Fr
LB	42	Hayden Kelly	So
LB	42	Christian Martinez	Fr
LB	43	Abel Clark	Fr
LB	43	Caleb Pierson	Fr
LB	44	Cole Daggett	Fr
LB	45	Eric Franco	Fr
DB	46	Datron Brooks	Fr
LB	50	Sean Roy	Fr
DL	53	Stanley Falenofoa	Jr
DL	57	David Adegbenro	Fr
DL	90	Wilfred Manor	Fr
DL	91	Xavier Daniels	Fr
DL	91	Vernon Henderson	Fr
DL	92	TJ Poloai	Sr
DL	94	Dominique Varela	So
DL	96	Tyson Carter	Jr
DL	97	Amari Bradford	Fr
DL	97	Joseph Williams	Jr
DL	98	Oghenemine Imarah	Fr
DL	99	Aven Shelton	Fr
DB		Martin Brown IV	Jr
DB		Justin Campbell	Jr
DL		Victor Idusuyi	Fr

Special teams

Pos.	#	Name	Class
K, P	31	Carson Roberts	Fr
LS	37	Grant Gensemer	Fr
K	41	Hayden Decossas	So
K	41	Michael Mayfield	Fr
P	49	Sergio Landeros	Jr
P	59	Robert Amador	Fr

Head coach

- Justin Carrigan
  Head coach/offensive coordinator

Coordinators/assistant coaches

- Chris Mineo
  Associate head coach/co-defensive coordinator/defensive line
- Jacob Martin
  Co-defensive coordinator/linebackers
- Victor Gill
  Offensive line
- Brandon Burton
  Defensive backs
- Rob Messinger
  Special teams coordinator/wide receivers
- Mitchell Buhler
  Running backs
- Jared Thames
  Tight ends
- Jonathan Cervantes
  Safeties
- Brady Foltz
  Offensive line
- Cody Gray
  Defensive line

Legend

- (C) Team captain
- (S) Suspended
- (I) Ineligible
- Injured
- Redshirt

Roster
Last update: August 12, 2023

== Game summaries ==
=== At Southwest Baptist ===
UT Permian Basin Falcons at Southwest Baptist Bearcats – Game summary

Quarter	1	2	3	4	Total
Falcons	7	7	3	7	24
Bearcats	0	0	9	7	16

at Plaster Stadium, Bolivar, Missouri

- Date: September 4
- Game time: 12:00 p.m. CDT
- Game weather: Cloudy
- Game attendance: 3,000
- Referee: John Doe
- Box score, Recap

Game information
First quarter
- TPB – Jordan Smart 21-yard pass from Clayton Roberts (Carson Roberts kick), 8:11. Falcons 7–0. Drive: 8 plays, 65 yards, 3:23.

Second quarter

- TPB – MJ Link 22-yard pass from Clayton Roberts (Carson Roberts kick), 0:43. Falcons 14–0. Drive: 4 plays, 82 yards, 1:51.

Third quarter

- SBU – TPB snap out of end zone, 14:03. Falcons 14–2.
- SBU – Curtis Culliard 22-yard pass from Cooper Callis (Logan Turner kick), 12:51. Falcons 14–9. Drive: 4 plays, 53 yards, 1:12.
- TPB – Carson Roberts 23-yard field goal, 7:22. Falcons 17–9. Drive: 15 plays, 69 yards, 5:29.

Fourth quarter

- TPB – Clayton Roberts 45-yard run (Carson Roberts kick), 9:11. Falcons 24–9. Drive: 7 plays, 80 yards, 3:23.
- SBU – Cooper Callis 7-yard run (Logan Turner kick), 2:26. Falcons 24–16. Drive: 6 plays, 66 yards, 1:58.

Statistics	TPB	SBU
First downs	23	18
Total yards	433	339
Rushing yards	170	50
Passing yards	263	289
Turnovers	0	1
Time of possession	33:29	26:31

Team	Category	Player	Statistics
UT Permian Basin	Passing	Clayton Roberts	18/29, 244 yards, 2 TD
UT Permian Basin	Rushing	Nathan Tilford	20 rushes, 97 yards
UT Permian Basin	Receiving	Kobe Robinson	7 receptions, 123 yards
Southwest Baptist	Passing	Cooper Callis	30/44, 289 yards, TD, INT
Southwest Baptist	Rushing	Cooper Callis	10 rushes, 31 yards, TD
Southwest Baptist	Receiving	Preston Carson	7 receptions, 108 yards

=== West Texas A&M ===
West Texas A&M Buffaloes at UT Permian Basin Falcons – Game summary

Quarter	1	2	3	4	Total
Buffaloes	7	10	7	7	31
Falcons	14	7	21	0	42

at Ratliff Stadium, Odessa, Texas

- Date: September 11
- Game time: 6:00 p.m. CDT
- Game weather: Temperature: 93 °F (34 °C) • Weather: Sunny • Wind: SE 13 MPH
- Game attendance: 5,771
- Referee: Robert Newton
- Box score, Recap

Game information
First quarter
- TPB – Matt Zubiate 7-yard pass from Clayton Roberts (Carson Roberts kick), 5:36. Falcons 7–0. Drive: 15 plays, 58 yards, 7:05.
- WT – Khalil Harris 1-yard run (Gage Urias kick), 2:31. Tied 7–7. Drive: 7 plays, 43 yards, 2:55.
- TPB – MJ Link 53-yard pass from Clayton Roberts (Carson Roberts kick), 1:11. Falcons 14–7. Drive: 3 plays, 75 yards, 1:12.

Second quarter

- WT – Jeremie Karngbaye 5-yard pass from Nick Gerber (Gage Urias kick), 13:49. Tied 14–14. Drive: 6 plays, 75 yards, 2:22.
- TPB – Nathan Tilford 10-yard pass from Clayton Roberts (Carson Roberts kick), 9:30. Falcons 21–14. Drive: 9 plays, 75 yards, 4:19.
- WT – Gage Urias 32-yard field goal, 0:00. Falcons 21–17. Drive: 13 plays, 43 yards, 4:52.

Third quarter

- TPB – MJ Link 44-yard pass from Clayton Roberts (Carson Roberts kick), 13:47. Falcons 28–17. Drive: 3 plays, 50 yards, 0:13.
- TPB – Jordan Smart 13-yard pass from Clayton Roberts (Carson Roberts kick), 6:10. Falcons 35–17. Drive: 9 plays, 78 yards, 4:01.
- TPB – Jordan Smart 26-yard pass from Clayton Roberts (Carson Roberts kick), 2:43. Falcons 42–17. Drive: 6 plays, 53 yards, 2:21.
- WT – Khalil Harris 1-yard run (Gage Urias kick), 0:36. Falcons 42–24. Drive: 4 plays, 45 yards, 1:59.

Fourth quarter

- WT – Markell Stephens-Peppers 8-yard pass from Nick Gerber (Gage Urias kick), 2:13. Falcons 42–31. Drive: 13 plays, 81 yards, 3:16.

Statistics	WT	TPB
First downs	26	21
Total yards	386	408
Rushing yards	125	127
Passing yards	261	281
Turnovers	2	0
Time of possession	29:00	31:00

Team	Category	Player	Statistics
West Texas A&M	Passing	Nick Gerber	25/39, 261 yards, 2 TD, 2 INT
West Texas A&M	Rushing	Khalil Harris	23 rushes, 102 yards, 2 TD
West Texas A&M	Receiving	Markell Stephens-Peppers	4 receptions, 66 yards, TD
UT Permian Basin	Passing	Clayton Roberts	23/32, 281 yards, 6 TD
UT Permian Basin	Rushing	Nathan Tilford	15 rushes, 75 yards
UT Permian Basin	Receiving	MJ Link	8 receptions, 140 yards, 2 TD

=== At Abilene Christian ===
UT Permian Basin Falcons at Abilene Christian Wildcats – Game summary

Quarter	1	2	3	4	Total
Falcons	3	0	0	6	9
Wildcats	0	27	0	7	34

at Wildcat Stadium, Abilene, Texas

- Date: September 18
- Game time: 6:00 p.m. CDT
- Game attendance: 9,018
- Referee: Vidal Jones
- Box score, Recap

Game information
First quarter
- TPB – Carson Roberts 35-yard field goal, 0:52. Falcons 3–0. Drive: 5 plays, 29 yards, 1:32.

Second quarter

- ACU – Blair Zepeda 30-yard field goal, 12:37. Tied 3–3. Drive: 7 plays, 47 yards, 3:10.
- ACU – Tyrese White 40-yard run (Blair Zepeda kick), 4:07. Wildcats 10–3. Drive: 3 plays, 50 yards, 1:07.
- ACU – Kobe Clark 16-yard pass from Stone Earle (Blair Zepeda kick), 1:00. Wildcats 17–3. Drive: 5 plays, 54 yards, 1:58.
- ACU – Jordan Paup 22-yard interception return (Blair Zepeda kick), 0:52. Wildcats 24–3.
- ACU – Blair Zepeda 26-yard field goal, 0:03. Wildcats 27–3. Drive: 3 plays, 10 yards, 0:20.

Third quarter

- No scoring plays

Fourth quarter

- TPB – Jayvon Davis 13-yard run (pass failed), 10:47. Wildcats 27–9. Drive: 9 plays, 80 yards, 4:05.
- ACU – Anthony Smith 4-yard run (Blair Zepeda kick), 7:32. Wildcats 34–9. Drive: 6 plays, 62 yards, 3:09.

Statistics	TPB	ACU
First downs	20	20
Total yards	262	389
Rushing yards	110	226
Passing yards	152	163
Turnovers	4	0
Time of possession	29:59	30:01

Team	Category	Player	Statistics
UT Permian Basin	Passing	Clayton Roberts	11/23, 102 yards, 2 INT
UT Permian Basin	Rushing	Jayvon Davis	10 rushes, 57 yards, TD
UT Permian Basin	Receiving	MJ Link	5 receptions, 53 yards
Abilene Christian	Passing	Stone Earle	17/24, 143 yards, TD
Abilene Christian	Rushing	Tyrese White	12 rushes, 103 yards, TD
Abilene Christian	Receiving	Kobe Clark	9 receptions, 92 yards, TD

=== At Western New Mexico ===
UT Permian Basin Falcons at Western New Mexico Mustangs – Game summary

Quarter	1	2	3	4	Total
Falcons	7	3	7	10	27
Mustangs	3	0	3	13	19

at Altamirano Stadium, Silver City, New Mexico

- Date: September 25
- Game time: 7:30 p.m. CDT/6:30 p.m. MDT
- Game weather: Temperature: 65 °F (18 °C) • Weather: Sunny • Wind: E 10 MPH
- Game attendance: 650
- Referee: Tony Acosta
- Box score, Recap

Game information
First quarter
- WNM – Nicholas Herber 21-yard field goal, 4:35. Mustangs 3–0. Drive: 11 plays, 40 yards, 3:49.
- TPB – MJ Link 10-yard pass from Clayton Roberts (Carson Roberts kick), 3:23. Falcons 7–3. Drive: 4 plays, 53 yards, 1:02.

Second quarter

- TPB – Carson Roberts 31-yard field goal, 12:04. Falcons 10–3. Drive: 9 plays, 54 yards, 1:33.

Third quarter

- WNM – Nicholas Herber 29-yard field goal, 8:49. Falcons 10–6. Drive: 10 plays, 63 yards, 2:30.
- TPB – Suddin Sapien 1-yard run (Carson Roberts kick), 3:51. Falcons 17–6. Drive: 10 plays, 51 yards, 4:54.

Fourth quarter

- WNM – Oly Ta'ase 1-yaes run (pass failed), 13:28. Falcons 17–12. Drive: 12 plays, 68 yards, 5:14.
- TPB – Jayvon Davis 15-yard run (Carson Roberts kick), 6:14. Falcons 24–12. Drive: 11 plays, 98 yards, 4:47.
- TPB – Carson Roberts 40-yard field goal, 3:42. Falcons 27–12. Drive: 4 plays, 2 yards, 2:18.
- WNM – Bryce Coleman 14-yard pass from Devin Larsen (Nicholas Herber kick), 0:47. Falcons 27–19. Drive: 10 plays, 76 yards, 2:49.

Statistics	TPB	WNM
First downs	20	29
Total yards	298	410
Rushing yards	149	160
Passing yards	149	250
Turnovers	1	2
Time of possession	26:55	33:05

Team	Category	Player	Statistics
UT Permian Basin	Passing	Clayton Roberts	11/25, 149 yards, TD
UT Permian Basin	Rushing	Jayvon Davis	19 rushes, 121 yards, TD
UT Permian Basin	Receiving	Kobe Robinson	6 receptions, 114 yards
Western New Mexico	Passing	Devin Larsen	28/44, 250 yards, TD, 2 INT
Western New Mexico	Rushing	Bryce Coleman	17 rushes, 81 yards
Western New Mexico	Receiving	Kenny Allen	2 receptions, 48 yards

=== Lincoln (CA) ===
Lincoln Oaklanders at UT Permian Basin Falcons – Game summary

Quarter	1	2	3	4	Total
Oaklanders	0	0	0	0	0
Falcons	23	7	24	21	75

at Ratliff Stadium, Odessa, Texas

- Date: October 9
- Game time: 6:00 p.m. CDT
- Game weather: Sunny
- Game attendance: 3,560
- Referee: Zach Erdmann
- Box score, Recap

Game information
First quarter
- TPB – Jayvon Davis 99-yard kickoff return (Carson Roberts kick), 14:46. Falcons 7–0.
- TPB – Isaiah Rios sacked in end zone, 11:57. Falcons 9–0.
- TPB – MJ Link 44-yard pass from Clayton Roberts (Carson Roberts kick), 10:39. Falcons 16–0. Drive: 3 plays, 47 yards, 1:07.
- TPB – Jayvon Davis 28-yard run (Carson Roberts kick), 0:44. Falcons 23–0. Drive: 9 plays, 80 yards, 3:00.

Second quarter

- TPB – Kobe Robinson 14-yard pass from Clayton Roberts (Carson Roberts kick), 3:36. Falcons 30–0. Drive: 6 plays, 42 yards, 1:52.

Third quarter

- TPB – Trent Ward 60-yard interception return (Carson Roberts kick), 14:40. Falcons 37–0.
- TPB – Carson Roberts 34-yard field goal, 13:23. Falcons 40–0. Drive: 4 plays, 0 yards, 0:19.
- TPB – Jaybon Davis 24-yard run (Carson Roberts kick), 6:04. Falcons 47–0. Drive: 9 plays, 72 yards, 3:02.
- TPB – Suddin Sapien 25-yard run (Carson Roberts kick), 1:53. Falcons 54–0. Drive: 6 plays, 58 yards, 1:43.

Fourth quarter

- TPB – Kevin Young Jr. 1-yard run (Carson Roberts kick), 7:09. Falcons 61–0. Drive: 6 plays, 32 yards, 2:54.
- TPB – Dorian Anderson 11-yard interception return (Carson Roberts kick), 6:51. Falcons 68–0.
- TPB – Nathan Tilford 5-yard run (Carson Roberts kick), 3:33. Falcons 75–0. Drive: 5 plays, 15 yards, 3:09.

Statistics	LIN	TPB
First downs	8	25
Total yards	133	457
Rushing yards	20	303
Passing yards	113	154
Turnovers	6	3
Time of possession	25:16	34:44

Team	Category	Player	Statistics
Lincoln (CA)	Passing	Isaiah Rios	10/29, 113 yards, 2 INT
Lincoln (CA)	Rushing	Terrance Robertson	8 rushes, 25 yards
Lincoln (CA)	Receiving	Frank Hall	2 receptions, 32 yards
UT Permian Basin	Passing	Clayton Roberts	8/18, 116 yards, 2 TD, 2 INT
UT Permian Basin	Rushing	Nathan Tilford	17 rushes, 94 yards, TD
UT Permian Basin	Receiving	MJ Link	3 receptions, 60 yards, TD

=== At Angelo State ===
UT Permian Basin Falcons at Angelo State Rams – Game summary

Quarter	1	2	3	4	Total
Falcons	7	0	0	7	14
Rams	13	7	14	0	34

at LeGrand Sports Complex, San Angelo, Texas

- Date: October 16
- Game time: 6:00 p.m. CDT
- Game weather: Sunny
- Game attendance: 4,873
- Referee: Kyle Fuehrer
- Box score, Recap

Game information
First quarter
- ASU – Asa Fuller 25-yard field goal, 11:50. Rams 3–0. Drive: 9 plays, 64 yards, 3:05.
- ASU – Asa Fuller 19-yard field goal, 3:09. Rams 6–0. Drive: 10 plays, 69 yards, 4:42.
- ASU – Hunter Kyle 39-yard interception return (Asa Fuller kick), 1:56. Rams 13–0.
- TPB – MJ Link 62-yard pass from Clayton Roberts (Michael Mayfield kick), 0:50. Rams 13–7. Drive: 4 plays, 75 yards, 1:06.

Second quarter

- ASU – CJ Odom 4-yard pass from Zach Bronkhorst (Asa Fuller kick), 0:00. Rams 20–7. Drive: 7 plays, 30 yards, 1:00.

Third quarter

- ASU – Nathaniel Omayebu III 2-yard pass from Zach Bronkhorst (Asa Fuller kick), 8:44. Rams 27–7. Drive: 3 plays, 11 yards, 1:19.
- ASU – Zach Bronkhorst 2-yard run (Asa Fuller kick), 1:03. Rams 34–7. Drive: 9 plays, 65 yards, 4:00.

Fourth quarter

- TPB – Jamil Pittman 16-yard punt return (Michael Mayfield kick), 8:31. Rams 34–14.

Statistics	TPB	ASU
First downs	12	28
Total yards	233	413
Rushing yards	27	208
Passing yards	206	205
Turnovers	5	1
Time of possession	20:35	39:25

Team	Category	Player	Statistics
UT Permian Basin	Passing	Clayton Roberts	12/27, 185 yards, TD, 3 INT
UT Permian Basin	Rushing	Jayvon Davis	13 rushes, 32 yards
UT Permian Basin	Receiving	MJ Link	6 receptions, 157 yards, TD
Angelo State	Passing	Zach Bronkhorst	17/34, 205 yards, 2 TD, INT
Angelo State	Rushing	CJ Odom	20 rushes, 81 yards
Angelo State	Receiving	Kellen Pachot	6 receptions, 84 yards

=== Eastern New Mexico ===
Eastern New Mexico Greyhounds at UT Permian Basin Falcons – Game summary

Quarter	1	2	3	4	Total
Greyhounds	0	21	0	0	21
Falcons	7	10	6	21	44

at Grande Communications Stadium, Midland, Texas

- Date: October 23
- Game time: 6:00 p.m. CDT
- Game weather: Sunny, 86 °F (30 °C)
- Game attendance: 4,280
- Referee: Joshua Bannerman
- Box score, Recap

Game information
First quarter
- TPB – MJ Link 6-yard pass from Clayton Roberts (Michael Mayfield kick), 10:11. Falcons 7–0. Drive: 12 plays, 75 yards, 4:49.

Second quarter

- TPB – Michael Mayfield 31-yard field goal, 14:02. Falcons 10–0. Drive: 7 plays, 22 yards, 2:14.
- ENM – Isaiah Tate 18-yard run (Cooper Hamilton kick), 8:09. Falcons 10–7. Drive: 9 plays, 75 yards, 5:53.
- ENM – Sateki Wolfgramm 88-yard fumble return (Cooper Hamilton kick), 5:39. Greyhounds 14–10.
- TPB – Jayvon Davis 15-yard run (Michael Mayfield kick), 3:24. Falcons 17–14. Drive: 7 plays, 43 yards, 2:15.
- ENM – Howard Russell 57-yard run (Cooper Hamilton kick), 1:25. Greyhounds 21–17. Drive: 4 plays, 75 yards, 1:59.

Third quarter

- TPB – Nathan Tilford 25-yard run (kick failed), 3:29. Falcons 23–21. Drive: 5 plays, 69 yards, 2:14.

Fourth quarter

- TPB – Marcus Molina 59-yard pass from Clayton Roberts (Michael Mayfield kikc), 12:12. Falcons 30–21. Drive: 3 plays, 66 yards, 1:17.
- TPB – MJ Link 46-yard pass from Clayton Roberts (Michael Mayfield kick), 10:07. Falcons 37–21. Drive: 3 plays, 61 yards, 1:01.
- TPB – Derrian Forge 35-yard interception return (Michael Mayfield kick), 8:37. Falcons 44–21.

Statistics	ENM	TPB
First downs	15	24
Total yards	290	397
Rushing yards	195	166
Passing yards	95	231
Turnovers	4	2
Time of possession	31:52	28:08

Team	Category	Player	Statistics
Eastern New Mexico	Passing	Nathan Valencia	12/26, 95 yards, 3 INT
Eastern New Mexico	Rushing	Howard Russell	26 rushes, 168 yards, TD
Eastern New Mexico	Receiving	Martavius Dill	5 receptions, 44 yards
UT Permian Basin	Passing	Clayton Roberts	19/36, 231 yards, 3 TD
UT Permian Basin	Rushing	Jayvon Davis	15 rushes, 91 yards, TD
UT Permian Basin	Receiving	Marcus Molina	5 receptions, 90 yards, TD

=== At Texas A&M–Commerce ===
UT Permian Basin Falcons at Texas A&M–Commerce Lions – Game summary

Quarter	1	2	3	4	Total
Falcons	0	0	0	0	0
Lions	0	21	20	0	41

at Memorial Stadium, Commerce, Texas

- Date: October 31
- Game time: 4:00 p.m. CDT
- Game weather: Temperature: 72 °F (22 °C) • Weather: Sunny • Wind: W 6 MPH
- Game attendance: 4,827
- Referee: Rickey Herron
- Box score, Recap

Game information
First quarter
- No scoring plays

Second quarter

- AMC – Carandal Hale 4-yard run (Jake Viquez kick), 14:50. Lions 7–0. Drive: 11 plays, 64 yards, 4:49.
- AMC – J. T. Smith 11-yard run (Jake Viquez kick), 1:27. Lions 14–0. Drive: 9 plays, 63 yards, 6:03.
- AMC – Andrew Armstrong 28-yard pass from Miklo Smalls (Jake Viquez kick), 0:46. Lions 21–0. Drive: 1 play, 28 yards, 0:08.

Third quarter

- AMC – Jake Viquez 34-yard field goal, 11:32. Lions 24–0. Drive: 8 pays, 31 yards, 3:28.
- AMC – Andrew Armstrong 25-yard pass from Miklo Smalls (Jake Viquez kick), 9:51. Lions 31–0. Drive: 1 play, 25 yards, 0:07.
- AMC – Alex Shillow 100-yard interception return (Jake Viquez kick), 3:23. Lions 38–0.
- AMC – Jake Viquez 42-yard field goal, 0:27. Lions 41–0. Drive: 5 plays, -10 yards, 1:44.

Fourth quarter

- No scoring plays

Statistics	TPB	AMC
First downs	12	21
Total yards	167	321
Rushing yards	47	183
Passing yards	120	138
Turnovers	5	1
Time of possession	26:14	33:46

Team	Category	Player	Statistics
UT Permian Basin	Passing	Clayton Roberts	11/21, 96 yards, 3 INT
UT Permian Basin	Rushing	Kevin Young Jr.	4 rushes, 33 yards
UT Permian Basin	Receiving	Kobe Robinson	4 receptions, 33 yards
Texas A&M–Commerce	Passing	Miklo Smalls	12/21, 138 yards, 2 TD, INT
Texas A&M–Commerce	Rushing	Koby Leavatts	7 rushes, 59 yards
Texas A&M–Commerce	Receiving	Andrew Armstrong	4 receptions, 81 yards, 2 TD

=== Texas A&M–Kingsville ===
Texas A&M–Kingsville Javelinas at UT Permian Basin Falcons – Game summary

Quarter	1	2	3	4	Total
Javelinas	6	17	3	3	29
Falcons	0	6	7	9	22

at Ratliff Stadium, Odessa, Texas

- Date: November 6
- Game time: 2:00 p.m. CDT
- Game weather: Sunny, 70 °F (21 °C)
- Game attendance: 3,255
- Referee: Randy Adams
- Box score, Recap

Game information
First quarter
- AMK – Gilbert Garza 40-yard field goal, 10:20. Javelinas 3–0. Drive: 6 plays, 14 yards, 3:10.
- AMK – Gilbert Garza 32-yard field goal, 3:53. Javelinas 6–0. Drive: 9 plays, 57 yards, 5:11.

Second quarter

- TPB – Michael Mayfield 31-yard field goal, 14:13. Javelinas 6–3. Drive: 13 plays, 74 yards, 5:32.
- AMK – Ryan Martinez 11-yard run (Gilbert Garza kick), 6:05. Javelinas 13–3. Drive: 5 plays, 66 yards, 2:37.
- AMK – Ty Chisum 13-yard pass from Wade Freeman (Gilbert Garza kick), 2:05. Javelinas 20–3. Drive: 5 plays, 53 yards, 2:54.
- TPB – Michael Mayfield 38-yard field goal, 0:24. Javelinas 20–6. Drive: 10 plays, 52 yards, 1:41.
- AMK – Gilbert Garza 27-yard field goal, 0:01. Javelinas 23–6. Drive: 3 plays, 22 yards, 0:12.

Third quarter

- AMK – Gilbert Garza 32-yard field goal, 11:59. Javelinas 26–6. Drive: 7 plays, 35 yards, 3:01.
- TPB – Jordan Smart 31-yard pass from Suddin Sapien (Carson Roberts kick), 5:36. Javelinas 26–13. Drive: 6 plays, 92 yards, 1:58.

Fourth quarter

- AMK – Gilbert Garza 47-yard field goal, 3:12. Javelinas 29–13. Drive: 7 plays, 21 yards, 3:23.
- TPB – Jordan Smart 10-yard pass from Suddin Sapien (pass failed), 1:18. Javelinas 29–19. Drive: 9 plays, 65 yards, 1:47.
- TPB – Carson Roberts 27-yard field goal, 0:46. Javelinas 29–22. Drive: 5 plays, 34 yards, 0:26.

Statistics	AMK	TPB
First downs	18	21
Total yards	370	382
Rushing yards	125	86
Passing yards	245	296
Turnovers	2	3
Time of possession	34:13	25:46

Team	Category	Player	Statistics
Texas A&M–Kingsville	Passing	Wade Freeman	13/20, 218 yards, TD
Texas A&M–Kingsville	Rushing	Amonte Bowen	7 rushes, 57 yards
Texas A&M–Kingsville	Receiving	Ty Chisum	4 receptions, 88 yards, TD
UT Permian Basin	Passing	Suddin Sapien	12/24, 200 yards, 2 TD
UT Permian Basin	Rushing	Nathan Tilford	13 rushes, 57 yards
UT Permian Basin	Receiving	Kobe Robinson	6 receptions, 108 yards

=== At Midwestern State ===
UT Permian Basin Falcons at Midwestern State Mustangs – Game summary

Quarter	1	2	3	4	Total
Falcons	14	7	0	9	30
Mustangs	10	9	17	0	36

at Memorial Stadium, Wichita Falls, Texas

- Date: November 13
- Game time: 1:00 p.m. CST
- Game weather: Temperature: 65 °F (18 °C) • Weather: Sunny • Wind: N 15 MPH
- Game attendance: 7,222
- Referee: Kerry Moore
- Box score, Recap

Game information
First quarter
- TPB – Kevin Young Jr. 32-yard run (Michael Mayfield kick), 14:07. Falcons 7–0. Drive: 2 plays, 23 yards, 0:34.
- TPB – Jordan Smart 69-yard pass from Suddin Sapien (Michael Mayfield kick), 11:05. Falcons 14–0. Drive: 2 plays, 71 yards, 0:40.
- MSU – Ritse Vaes 33-yard field goal, 7:39. Falcons 14–3. Drive: 9 plays, 59 yards, 3:26.
- MSU – Kylan Harrison 14-yard pass from Neiko Hollins (Ritse Vaes kick), 0:00. Falcons 14–10. Drive: 6 plays, 87 yards, 3:36.

Second quarter

- MSU – Ritse Vaes 36-yard field goal, 9:19. Falcons 14–13. Drive: 9 plays, 40 yards, 3:14.
- TPB – Jordan Smart 19-yard pass from MJ Link (Michael Mayfield kick), 6:52. Falcons 21–13. Drive: 7 plays, 75 yards, 2:27.
- MSU – Ritse Vaes 40-yard field goal, 3:45. Falcons 21–16. Drive: 7 plays, 38 yards, 3:03.
- MSU – Ritse Vaes 30-yard field goal, 1:00. Falcons 21–19. Drive: 4 plays, 2 yards, 0:24.

Third quarter

- MSU – Jalen March 3-yard run (Jalen March run), 8:34. Mustangs 27–21. Drive: 3 plays, 13 yards, 0:49.
- MSU – Dylon Davis 56-yard interception return (Ritse Vaes kick), 7:34. Mustangs 34–21.
- MSU – Kevin Young Jr. tackled in end zone, 3:51. Mustangs 36–21.

Fourth quarter

- TPB – Trenton Kennedy tackled in end zone, 6:27. Mustangs 36–23.
- TPB – Brock Johnson 4-yard pass from Suddin Sapien (Michael Mayfield kick), 4:47. Mustangs 36–30. Drive: 5 plays, 58 yards, 1:34.

Statistics	TPB	MSU
First downs	25	17
Total yards	480	380
Rushing yards	198	215
Passing yards	282	165
Turnovers	6	2
Time of possession	29:15	30:45

Team	Category	Player	Statistics
UT Permian Basin	Passing	Suddin Sapien	18/34, 263 yards, 2 TD, 4 INT
UT Permian Basin	Rushing	Kevin Young Jr.	20 rushes, 106 yards, TD
UT Permian Basin	Receiving	Jordan Smart	8 receptions, 156 yards, 2 TD
Midwestern State	Passing	Neiko Hollins	15/31, 165 yards, TD, 2 INT
Midwestern State	Rushing	Jalen March	21 rushes, 158 yards, TD
Midwestern State	Receiving	Kylan Harrison	6 receptions, 94 yards, TD

=== Vs. Oklahoma Baptist (Heritage Bowl) ===
Oklahoma Baptist Bison vs. UT Permian Basin Falcons (2021 Heritage Bowl) – Game summary

Quarter	1	2	3	4	Total
Bison	3	14	7	0	24
Falcons	7	0	0	14	21

at Tiger Stadium, Corsicana, Texas

- Date: December 4
- Game time: 12:00 p.m. CST
- Game weather: Temperature: 70 °F (21 °C) • Weather: Cloudy • Wind: 9 MPH
- Game attendance: 3,576
- Referee: Joe Horn
- Box score, Recap

Game information
First quarter
- OBU – Guillermo Garcia Rodriguez 32-yard field goal, 9:17. Bison 3–0. Drive: 11 plays, 58 yards, 3:50.
- TPB – Matt Zubiate 9-yard pass from Suddin Sapien (Michael Mayfield kick), 2:45. Falcons 7–3. Drive: 7 plays, 72 yards, 2:08.

Second quarter

- OBU – Josh Cornell 12-yard pass from Preston Haire (Guillermo Garcia Rodriguez kick), 14:57. Bison 10–7. Drive: 7 plays, 62 yards, 2:43.
- OBU – Tyler Stuever 1-yard run (Guillermo Garcia Rodriguez kick), 3:19. Bison 17–7. Drive: 10 plays, 84 yards, 4:02.

Third quarter

- OBU – Preston Haire 17-yard run (Guillermo Garcia Rodriguez kick), 4:17. Bison 24–7. Drive: 12 plays, 65 yards, 4:41.

Fourth quarter

- TPB – Jordan Smart 25-yard pass from Clayton Roberts (Michael Mayfield kick), 13:16. Bison 24–14. Drive: 7 plays, 51 yards, 1:48.
- TPB – Marcus Molina 11-yard pass from Clayton Roberts (Michael Mayfield kick), 9:20. Bison 24–21. Drive: 4 plays, 52 yards, 1:20.

Statistics	OBU	TPB
First downs	26	18
Total yards	368	298
Rushing yards	187	18
Passing yards	181	280
Turnovers	1	0
Time of possession	39:16	20:44

Team	Category	Player	Statistics
Oklahoma Baptist	Passing	Preston Haire	25/41, 181 yards, TD, INT
Oklahoma Baptist	Rushing	Tyler Stuever	30 rushes, 150 yards, TD
Oklahoma Baptist	Receiving	Josh Cornell	8 receptions, 72 yards, TD
UT Permian Basin	Passing	Clayton Roberts	12/24, 161 yards, 2 TD
UT Permian Basin	Rushing	Kevin Young Jr.	15 rushes, 46 yards
UT Permian Basin	Receiving	Jordan Smart	6 receptions, 138 yards, TD

== Statistics ==
=== Scoring ===
Scores against non-conference opponents

	1	2	3	4	Total
Opponents	3	41	16	14	74
UT Permian Basin	40	14	27	48	129

Scores against the Lone Star Conference

	1	2	3	4	Total
Opponents	39	85	64	23	211
UT Permian Basin	49	33	41	56	179

Scores against all opponents

	1	2	3	4	Total
Opponents	42	126	80	37	285
UT Permian Basin	89	47	68	104	308
