= 2021 Midwestern State Mustangs football team =

American college football season

2021 Midwestern State Mustangs football
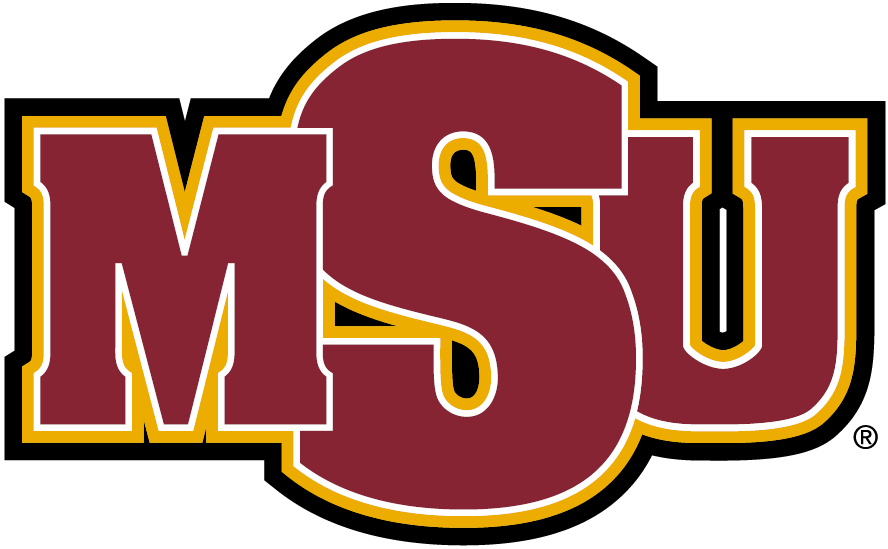

LSC champion
- Conference: Lone Star Conference
- Record: 7–3 (6–1 LSC)
- Head coach: Bill Maskill (20th season)
- Offensive coordinator: Skyler Mornhinweg (2nd season)
- Offensive scheme: Multiple
- Defensive coordinator: Rich Renner (14th season)
- Base defense: 4–3
- Home stadium: Memorial Stadium

2021 Lone Star Conference football standings
	Conf.			Overall
Team	W		L	W		L
Midwestern State $	6	–	1	7	–	3
No. 11 Angelo State ^	5	–	2	11	–	3
West Texas A&M	5	–	2	7	–	4
Texas A&M–Commerce	5	–	2	7	–	4
Texas A&M–Kingsville	3	–	4	5	–	5
UT Permian Basin #	3	–	4	5	–	6
Eastern New Mexico	1	–	6	3	–	7
Western New Mexico	0	–	7	1	–	9
$ – Conference champion; ^ – NCAA Division II playoff participant; # – Heritage Bowl participant; Rankings from AFCA poll

The 2021 Midwestern State Mustangs football team represented Midwestern State University in the 2021 NCAA Division II football season. They were led by head coach Bill Maskill, who was in his 20th season at Midwestern State. The Mustangs played their home games at Memorial Stadium and were members of the Lone Star Conference.

== Preseason ==
=== LSC media poll ===
The LSC media poll was released on July 27, 2021. The Mustangs were predicted to finish tied-for-fourth in the conference.

== Schedule ==
Midwestern State announced their 2021 football schedule on March 24, 2021.

Date	Time	Opponent	Rank	Site	Result	Attendance
September 4	1:00 p.m	at Quincy*		QU Stadium; Quincy, IL	W 48–27	1,500
September 11	6:00 p.m	vs. No. 7 Texas A&M–Commerce		Choctaw Stadium; Arlington, TX	W 31–30	6,712
September 18	6:00 p.m	at No. 17 Angelo State	No. 20	LeGrand Sports Complex; San Angelo, TX	W 35–17	4,122
September 25	7:00 p.m	Eastern New Mexico	No. 15	Memorial Stadium; Wichita Falls, TX	W 31–24 ^{OT}	7,122
October 2	8:00 p.m	at Central Washington*	No. 11	Tomlinson Stadium; Ellensburg, WA	L 20–30	4,714
October 9	7:00 p.m	Texas A&M–Kingsville	No. 20	Memorial Stadium; Wichita Falls, TX	W 30–13	6,891
October 23	6:00 p.m	at Tarleton State*	No. 19	Memorial Stadium; Stephenville, TX	L 14–17	16,216
October 30	7:00 p.m	Western New Mexico^{†}	No. 24	Memorial Stadium; Wichita Falls, TX	W 52–10	8,200
November 6	6:00 p.m	at West Texas A&M	No. 21	Buffalo Stadium; Canyon, TX	L 12–15	7,315
November 13	1:00 p.m	UT Permian Basin		Memorial Stadium; Wichita Falls, TX	W 36–30	7,222
*Non-conference game; ^{†}Homecoming; Rankings from AFCA Poll released prior to the game

== Rankings ==
Ranking movements Legend: ██ Increase in ranking ██ Decrease in ranking — = Not ranked RV = Received votes
	Week												
Poll	Pre	1	2	3	4	5	6	7	8	9	10	11	Final
AFCA	RV	RV	20	15	11	20	19	19	24	21	RV	—	—
