= 2021 Texas A&M–Commerce Lions football team =

American college football season

2021 Texas A&M–Commerce Lions football
- Conference: Lone Star Conference
- Record: 7–4 (5–2 LSC)
- Head coach: David Bailiff (3rd season)
- Offensive coordinator: Billy Riebock (3rd season)
- Offensive scheme: Spread
- Defensive coordinator: Xavier Adibi (3rd season)
- Base defense: 4–2–5/4–3 hybrid
- Home stadium: Memorial Stadium

2021 Lone Star Conference football standings
	Conf.			Overall
Team	W		L	W		L
Midwestern State $	6	–	1	7	–	3
No. 11 Angelo State ^	5	–	2	11	–	3
West Texas A&M	5	–	2	7	–	4
Texas A&M–Commerce	5	–	2	7	–	4
Texas A&M–Kingsville	3	–	4	5	–	5
UT Permian Basin #	3	–	4	5	–	6
Eastern New Mexico	1	–	6	3	–	7
Western New Mexico	0	–	7	1	–	9
$ – Conference champion; ^ – NCAA Division II playoff participant; # – Heritage Bowl participant; Rankings from AFCA Poll

The 2021 Texas A&M–Commerce Lions football team represented Texas A&M University–Commerce as a member of the Lone Star Conference (LSC) during the 2021 NCAA Division II football season. Led by third-year head coach David Bailiff, the Lions compiled an overall record of 7–4 with a mark of 5–2 in conference play, tying for second place in the LSC. Texas A&M–Commerce played their home games at Memorial Stadium in Commerce, Texas.

The 2021 season was the last that the Lions competed in the Lone Star Conference. In 2022, the program will move to NCAA Division I Football Championship Subdivision play and compete in the Southland Conference.

On August 12, 2020, the Lone Star Conference postponed fall competition in 2020 for several sports due to the COVID-19 pandemic. Two weeks later, Texas A&M–Commerce announced that they would out the football program in competing in the 2020–21 academic year.

== Schedule ==
Texas A&M–Commerce announced their 2021 football schedule on March 24, 2021.

Date	Time	Opponent	Rank	Site	Result	Attendance
September 2	7:00 p.m.	at No. 12 CSU Pueblo*	No. 8	ThunderBowl; Pueblo, CO	W 12–6	6,590
September 11	6:00 p.m.	vs. Midwestern State	No. 7	Choctaw Stadium; Arlington, TX	L 30–31	6,712
September 18	6:00 p.m.	No. 1 West Florida*	No. 21	Memorial Stadium; Commerce, TX	L 17–35	8,269
September 25	7:00 p.m.	at Texas A&M–Kingsville		Javelina Stadium; Kingsville, TX (Chennault Cup)	W 35–10	7,071
October 2	6:30 p.m.	Fort Lauderdale*		Memorial Stadium; Commerce, TX	W 72–6	4,133
October 9	4:00 p.m.	Saginaw Valley State*		Memorial Stadium; Commerce, TX	L 17–20 ^{OT}	5,102
October 16	4:00 p.m.	Western New Mexico^{†}		Memorial Stadium; Commerce, TX	W 58–0	6,875
October 23	6:00 p.m.	at West Texas A&M		Buffalo Stadium; Canyon, TX (East Texas vs. West Texas)	W 15–3	6,216
October 30	4:00 p.m.	UT Permian Basin		Memorial Stadium; Commerce, TX	W 41–0	4,827
November 6	6:00 p.m.	at Angelo State		LeGrand Sports Complex; San Angelo, TX	L 3–30	3,817
November 13	4:00 p.m.	Eastern New Mexico		Memorial Stadium; Commerce, TX	W 30–10	5,077
*Non-conference game; ^{†}Homecoming; Rankings from AFCA Poll released prior to the game

== Rankings ==
Ranking movements Legend: ██ Increase in ranking ██ Decrease in ranking — = Not ranked RV = Received votes
	Week												
Poll	Pre	1	2	3	4	5	6	7	8	9	10	11	Final
AFCA	8	7	21	RV	RV	—	—	—	—	—	—	—	—
