= 2021 West Texas A&M Buffaloes football team =

American college football season

2021 West Texas A&M Buffaloes football
- Conference: Lone Star Conference
- Record: 7–4 (5–2 LSC)
- Head coach: Hunter Hughes (5th season)
- Offensive coordinator: Russ Martin (2nd season)
- Offensive scheme: Spread
- Defensive coordinator: Joe Morris (3rd season)
- Base defense: 3–4
- Home stadium: Buffalo Stadium

2021 Lone Star Conference football standings
	Conf.			Overall
Team	W		L	W		L
Midwestern State $	6	–	1	7	–	3
No. 11 Angelo State ^	5	–	2	11	–	3
West Texas A&M	5	–	2	7	–	4
Texas A&M–Commerce	5	–	2	7	–	4
Texas A&M–Kingsville	3	–	4	5	–	5
UT Permian Basin #	3	–	4	5	–	6
Eastern New Mexico	1	–	6	3	–	7
Western New Mexico	0	–	7	1	–	9
$ – Conference champion; ^ – NCAA Division II playoff participant; # – Heritage Bowl participant; Rankings from AFCA poll

The 2021 West Texas A&M Buffaloes football team represented West Texas A&M University during the 2021 NCAA Division II football season as a member of the Lone Star Conference (LSC). The Buffaloes were led by fifth-year head coach Hunter Hughes and played their home games at Buffalo Stadium in Canyon, Texas. The Buffs finished the season with an overall record of 7–4 with an LSC record of 5–2, finishing in a three-way tie for second place in the conference.

== Schedule ==
The Buffs' full schedule was announced on March 18, 2021.

Date	Time	Opponent	Site	Result	Attendance
September 2	7:00 p.m.	Texas College*	Buffalo Stadium; Canyon, TX	W 73–0	5,350
September 11	6:00 p.m.	at UT Permian Basin	Ratliff Stadium; Odessa, TX	L 31–42	5,771
September 18	7:00 p.m.	Western New Mexico	Buffalo Stadium; Canyon, TX	W 42–14	5,677
September 25	7:00 p.m.	No. 5 Colorado Mines*	Buffalo Stadium; Canyon, TX	L 13–21	7,398
October 2	3:05 p.m.	at Western Oregon*	MacArthur Field; Monmouth, OR	L 38–41	3,275
October 9	7:00 p.m.	Angelo State^{†}	Buffalo Stadium; Canyon, TX	W 31–15	9,326
October 16	7:00 p.m.	at Eastern New Mexico	Greyhound Stadium; Portales, NM (Wagon Wheel)	W 44–24	3,382
October 23	6:00 p.m.	Texas A&M–Commerce	Buffalo Stadium; Canyon, TX (East Texas vs. West Texas)	L 3–15	6,216
October 30	7:00 p.m.	at Texas A&M–Kingsville	Javelina Stadium; Kingsville, TX	W 35–23	8,537
November 6	6:00 p.m.	No. 21 Midwestern State	Buffalo Stadium; Canyon, TX	W 15–12	7,315
November 13	11:00 a.m.	Bethel (KS)*	Buffalo Stadium; Canyon, TX	W 52–9	5,728
*Non-conference game; ^{†}Homecoming; Rankings from AFCA Poll released prior to the game; All times are in Central time

== LSC preseason media poll ==
The LSC preseason media poll was released on July 27, 2021. The Buffaloes were predicted to finish third in the conference, and they received one first-place vote.

== Game summaries ==
=== Texas College ===
Texas College Steers at West Texas A&M Buffaloes – Game summary

Quarter	1	2	3	4	Total
Steers	0	0	0	0	0
Buffaloes	28	24	14	7	73

at Buffalo Stadium, Canyon, Texas

- Date: September 2
- Game time: 7:00 p.m. CDT
- Game weather: Clear skies, 85 °F (29 °C)
- Game attendance: 5,350
- Referee: Jovito Sabal
- Box score, Recap

Game information
First quarter
- WT – Khalil Harris 69-yard run (Gage Urias kick), 14:41. Buffaloes 7–0. Drive: 1 play, 69 yards, 0:19.
- WT – Jordan Johnson 1-yard run (Gage Urias kick), 11:01. Buffaloes 14–0. Drive: 4 plays, 53 yards, 1:34.
- WT – Khalil Harris 5-yard run (Gage Urias kick), 8:08. Buffaloes 21–0. Drive: 2 plays, 13 yards, 0:51.
- WT – Markell Stephens-Pepper 8-yard pass from Nick Gerber (Gage Urias kick), 3:22. Buffaloes 28–0. Drive: 5 plays, 43 yards, 2:34.

Second quarter

- WT – Markell Stephens-Pepper 36-yard pass from Nick Gerber (Gage Urias kick), 14:14. Buffaloes 35–0. Drive: 3 plays, 43 yards, 1:19.
- WT – Jarrod Compton 7-yard run (Gage Urias kick), 9:19. Buffaloes 42–0. Drive: 6 plays, 50 yards, 2:56.
- WT – Isaiah Smallwood 3-yard run (Gage Urias kick), 4:31. Buffaloes 49–0. Drive: 6 plays, 32 yards, 2:46.
- WT – Gage Urias 19-yard field goal, 0:00. Buffaloes 52–0. Drive: 7 plays, 68 yards, 3:25.

Third quarter

- WT – Lindsay Marcus 16-yard run (Gage Urias kick), 8:00. Buffaloes 59–0. Drive: 7 plays, 55 yards, 3:30.
- WT – Hesston Marshall 13-yard run (Gage Urias kick), 3:45. Buffaloes 66–0. Drive: 6 plays, 28 yards, 3:37.

Fourth quarter

- WT – Isaiah Smallwood 3-yard run (Gage Urias kick), 7:41. Buffaloes 73–0. Drive: 9 plays, 61 yards, 6:47.

Statistics	TC	WT
First downs	6	24
Total yards	116	557
Rushing yards	24	402
Passing yards	92	155
Turnovers	1	0
Time of possession	26:08	29:38

Team	Category	Player	Statistics
Texas College	Passing	Jerry McConico Jr.	10/19, 92 yards
Texas College	Rushing	Diamond Woods	7 rushes, 27 yards
Texas College	Receiving	Derrick Cooper	4 receptions, 43 yards
West Texas A&M	Passing	Nick Gerber	10/11, 150 yards, 2 TD
West Texas A&M	Rushing	Khalil Harris	7 rushes, 112 yards, 2 TD
West Texas A&M	Receiving	Markell Stephens-Peppers	3 receptions, 57 yards, 2 TD

=== At UT Permian Basin ===
West Texas A&M Buffaloes at UT Permian Basin Falcons – Game summary

Quarter	1	2	3	4	Total
Buffaloes	7	10	7	7	31
Falcons	14	7	21	0	42

at Ratliff Stadium, Odessa, Texas

- Date: September 11
- Game time: 6:00 p.m. CDT
- Game weather: Sunny, 93 °F (34 °C)
- Game attendance: 5,771
- Referee: Robert Newton
- Box score, Recap

Game information
First quarter
- TPB – Matt Zubiate 7-yard pass from Clayton Roberts (Carson Roberts kick), 5:36. Falcons 7–0. Drive: 15 plays, 58 yards, 7:05.
- WT – Khalil Harris 1-yard run (Gage Urias kick), 2:31. Tied 7–7. Drive: 7 plays, 43 yards, 2:55.
- TPB – MJ Link 53-yard pass from Clayton Roberts (Carson Roberts kick), 1:11. Falcons 14–7. Drive: 3 plays, 75 yards, 1:12.

Second quarter

- WT – Jeremie Karngbaye 5-yard pass from Nick Gerber (Gage Urias kick), 13:49. Tied 14–14. Drive: 6 plays, 75 yards, 2:22.
- TPB – Nathan Tilford 10-yard pass from Clayton Roberts (Carson Roberts kick), 9:30. Falcons 21–14. Drive: 9 plays, 75 yards, 4:19.
- WT – Gage Urias 32-yard field goal, 0:00. Falcons 21–17. Drive: 13 plays, 43 yards, 4:52.

Third quarter

- TPB – MJ Link 44-yard pass from Clayton Roberts (Carson Roberts kick), 13:47. Falcons 28–17. Drive: 3 plays, 50 yards, 0:13.
- TPB – Jordan Smart 13-yard pass from Clayton Roberts (Carson Roberts kick), 6:10. Falcons 35–17. Drive: 9 plays, 78 yards, 4:01.
- TPB – Jordan Smart 26-yard pass from Clayton Roberts (Carson Roberts kick), 2:43. Falcons 42–17. Drive: 6 plays, 53 yards, 2:21.
- WT – Khalil Harris 1-yard run (Gage Urias kick), 0:36. Falcons 42–24. Drive: 4 plays, 45 yards, 1:59.

Fourth quarter

- WT – Markell Stephens-Peppers 8-yard pass from Nick Gerber (Gage Urias kick), 2:13. Falcons 42–31. Drive: 13 plays, 81 yards, 3:16.

Statistics	WT	TPB
First downs	26	21
Total yards	386	408
Rushing yards	125	127
Passing yards	261	281
Turnovers	2	0
Time of possession	29:00	31:00

Team	Category	Player	Statistics
West Texas A&M	Passing	Nick Gerber	25/39, 261 yards, 2 TD, 2 INT
West Texas A&M	Rushing	Khalil Harris	23 rushes, 102 yards, 2 TD
West Texas A&M	Receiving	Markell Stephens-Peppers	4 receptions, 66 yards, TD
UT Permian Basin	Passing	Clayton Roberts	23/32, 281 yards, 6 TD
UT Permian Basin	Rushing	Nathan Tilford	15 rushes, 75 yards
UT Permian Basin	Receiving	MJ Link	8 receptions, 140 yards, 2 TD

=== Western New Mexico ===
Western New Mexico Mustangs at West Texas A&M Buffaloes – Game summary

Quarter	1	2	3	4	Total
Mustangs	0	0	0	14	14
Buffaloes	14	7	0	21	42

at Buffalo Stadium, Canyon, Texas

- Date: September 18
- Game time: 7:00 p.m. CDT
- Game weather: Sunny
- Game attendance: 5,677
- Referee: Joshua Bannerman
- Box score, Recap

Game information
First quarter
- WT – Caleb Ollison 6-yard pass from Nick Gerber (Gage Urias kick), 9:23. Buffaloes 7–0. Drive: 4 plays, 29 yards, 1:18.
- WT – Brandon Blair 22-yard run (Gage Urias kick), 0:08. Buffaloes 14–0. Drive: 7 plays, 50 yards, 2:19.

Second quarter

- WT – Noah Bogardus 82-yard pass from Nick Gerber (Gage Urias kick), 13:09. Buffaloes 21–0. Drive: 2 plays, 80 yards, 0:44.

Third quarter

- No scoring plays

Fourth quarter

- WNMU – Bryce Coleman 24-yard run (James Hoben kick), 13:57. Buffaloes 21–7. Drive: 10 plays, 88 yards, 4:17.
- WT – Marcus Lindsay 22-yard run (Gage Urias kick), 11:45. Buffaloes 28–7. Drive: 5 plays, 58 yards, 2:05.
- WT – Brandon Blair 32-yard pass from Nick Gerber (Gage Urias kick), 8:23. Buffaloes 35–7. Drive: 3 plays, 55 yards, 1:41.
- WNMU – Kory Coleman 16-yard pass from Devin Larsen (James Hoben kick), 4:46. Buffaloes 35–14. Drive: 8 plays, 81 yards, 3:26.
- WT – Marcus Lindsay 6-yard run (Gage Urias kick), 2:55. Buffaloes 42–14. Drive: 3 plays, 53 yards, 1:42.

Statistics	WNMU	WT
First downs	22	19
Total yards	408	479
Rushing yards	39	124
Passing yards	369	355
Turnovers	0	1
Time of possession	35:35	24:25

Team	Category	Player	Statistics
Western New Mexico	Passing	Devin Larsen	34/53, 369 yards, TD
Western New Mexico	Rushing	Bryce Coleman	14 rushes, 35 yards, TD
Western New Mexico	Receiving	Allen Ortiz	4 receptions, 80 yards
West Texas A&M	Passing	Nick Gerber	14/24, 355 yards, 3 TD
West Texas A&M	Rushing	Marcus Lindsay	5 rushes, 53 yards, 2 TD
West Texas A&M	Receiving	Noah Bogardus	2 receptions, 93 yards, TD

=== No. 5 Colorado Mines ===
No. 5 Colorado Mines Orediggers at West Texas A&M Buffaloes – Game summary

Quarter	1	2	3	4	Total
No. 5 Orediggers	0	0	14	7	21
Buffaloes	10	3	0	0	13

at Buffalo Stadium, Canyon, Texas

- Date: September 25
- Game time: 7:00 p.m. CDT
- Game weather: Sunny
- Game attendance: 7,398
- Referee: Jeffrey Bell
- Box score, Recap

Game information
First quarter
- WT – Hunter Kaufman 50-yard pass from Nick Gerber (Gage Urias kick), 14:20. Buffaloes 7–0. Drive: 1 play, 50 yards, 0:09.
- WT – Gage Urias 37-yard field goal, 4:12. Buffaloes 10–0. Drive: 9 plays, 66 yards, 2:44.

Second quarter

- WT – Gage Urias 39-yard field goal, 6:21. Buffaloes 13–0. Drive: 4 plays, 1 yard, 1:17.

Third quarter

- CSM – Nathan Mackey 4-yard run (Jacob Click kick), 6:43. Buffaloes 13–7. Drive: 11 plays, 61 yards, 5:27.
- CSM – John Matocha 3-yard run (Jason Click kick), 5:27. Orediggers 14–13. Drive: 3 plays, 22 yards, 0:22.

Fourth quarter

- CSM – Josh Johnston 5-yard pass from John Matocha (Jason Click kick), 11:37. Orediggers 21–13. Drive: 11 plays, 65 yards, 5:13.

Statistics	CSM	WT
First downs	22	13
Total yards	321	316
Rushing yards	193	130
Passing yards	128	186
Turnovers	1	2
Time of possession	36:28	21:45

Team	Category	Player	Statistics
Colorado Mines	Passing	John Matocha	15/22, 128 yards, TD, INT
Colorado Mines	Rushing	Michael Zeman	29 rushes, 121 yards
Colorado Mines	Receiving	Josh Johnston	3 reception, 32 yards, TD
West Texas A&M	Passing	Nick Gerber	12/23, 186 yards, TD, INT
West Texas A&M	Rushing	Khalil Harris	15 rushes, 82 yards
West Texas A&M	Receiving	Hunter Kaufman	2 receptions, 77 yards, TD

=== At Western Oregon ===
West Texas A&M Buffaloes at Western Oregon Wolves – Game summary

Quarter	1	2	3	4	Total
Buffaloes	10	7	7	14	38
Wolves	7	14	0	20	41

at MacArthur Field, Monmouth, Oregon

- Date: October 2
- Game time: 3:05 p.m. CDT/1:05 p.m. PDT
- Game attendance: 3,275
- Referee: Jeffry Davis
- Box score, Recap

Statistics	WT	WOU
First downs		
Total yards		
Rushing yards		
Passing yards		
Turnovers		
Time of possession		

Team	Category	Player	Statistics
West Texas A&M	Passing		
West Texas A&M	Rushing		
West Texas A&M	Receiving		
Western Oregon	Passing		
Western Oregon	Rushing		
Western Oregon	Receiving		

=== Angelo State ===
Angelo State Rams at West Texas A&M Buffaloes – Game summary

Quarter	1	2	3	4	Total
Rams	3	0	6	6	15
Buffaloes	7	10	7	7	31

at Buffalo Stadium, Canyon, Texas

- Date: October 9
- Game time: 7:00 p.m. CDT
- Game weather: Sunny
- Game attendance: 9,326
- Referee: Joel Williams
- Box score, Recap

Statistics	ASU	WT
First downs		
Total yards		
Rushing yards		
Passing yards		
Turnovers		
Time of possession		

Team	Category	Player	Statistics
Angelo State	Passing		
Angelo State	Rushing		
Angelo State	Receiving		
West Texas A&M	Passing		
West Texas A&M	Rushing		
West Texas A&M	Receiving		

=== At Eastern New Mexico ===
West Texas A&M Buffaloes at Eastern New Mexico Greyhounds – Game summary

Quarter	1	2	3	4	Total
Buffaloes	10	17	14	3	44
Greyhounds	7	3	0	14	24

at Greyhound Stadium, Portales, New Mexico

- Date: October 16
- Game time: 7:00 p.m. CDT/6:00 p.m. MDT
- Game weather: Sunny, 68 °F (20 °C)
- Game attendance: 3,382
- Referee: Tony Acosta
- Box score, Recap

Statistics	WT	ENMU
First downs		
Total yards		
Rushing yards		
Passing yards		
Turnovers		
Time of possession		

Team	Category	Player	Statistics
West Texas A&M	Passing		
West Texas A&M	Rushing		
West Texas A&M	Receiving		
Eastern New Mexico	Passing		
Eastern New Mexico	Rushing		
Eastern New Mexico	Receiving		

=== Texas A&M–Commerce ===
Texas A&M–Commerce Lions at West Texas A&M Buffaloes – Game summary

Quarter	1	2	3	4	Total
Lions	5	0	10	0	15
Buffaloes	0	0	3	0	3

at Buffalo Stadium, Canyon, Texas

- Date: October 23
- Game time: 6:00 p.m. CDT
- Game weather: Sunny
- Game attendance: 6,216
- Referee: Dal Watson
- Box score, Recap

Game information
First quarter
- TAMUC – Team safety, 8:00. Lions 2–0.
- TAMUC – Jake Viquez 40-yard field goal, 0:47. Lions 5–0. Drive: 4 plays, 0 yards, 0:25.

Second quarter

- No scoring plays

Third quarter

- TAMUC – Miklo Smalls 9-yard run (Jake Viquez kick), 12:16. Lions 12–0. Drive: 6 plays, 40 yards, 2:35.
- WT – Cason Polivoda 35-yard field goal, 6:26. Lions 12–3. Drive: 15 plays, 65 yards, 5:45.

Fourth quarter

- TAMUC – Jake Viquez 42-yard field goal, 1:17. Lions 15–3. Drive: 9 plays, 37 yards, 4:59.

Statistics	TAMUC	WT
First downs	18	15
Total yards	290	233
Rushing yards	104	135
Passing yards	186	98
Turnovers	2	4
Time of possession	32:30	26:16

Team	Category	Player	Statistics
Texas A&M–Commerce	Passing	Miklo Smalls	21/38, 186 yards, INT
Texas A&M–Commerce	Rushing	Carandal Hale	12 rushes, 31 yards
Texas A&M–Commerce	Receiving	Matt Childers	7 receptions, 76 yards
West Texas A&M	Passing	Nick Gerber	12/25, 98 yards, 2 INT
West Texas A&M	Rushing	Brandon Blair	16 rushes, 60 yards
West Texas A&M	Receiving	Noah Bogardus	1 reception, 30 yards

=== At Texas A&M–Kingsville ===
West Texas A&M Buffaloes at Texas A&M–Kingsville Javelinas – Game summary

Quarter	1	2	3	4	Total
Buffaloes	14	7	0	14	35
Javelinas	2	3	10	8	23

at Javelina Stadium, Kingsville, Texas

- Date: October 30
- Game time: 7:00 p.m. CDT
- Game weather: 77 °F (25 °C)
- Game attendance: 8,537
- Referee: Robert Newton
- Box score, Recap

Statistics	WT	TAMUK
First downs		
Total yards		
Rushing yards		
Passing yards		
Turnovers		
Time of possession		

Team	Category	Player	Statistics
West Texas A&M	Passing		
West Texas A&M	Rushing		
West Texas A&M	Receiving		
Texas A&M–Kingsville	Passing		
Texas A&M–Kingsville	Rushing		
Texas A&M–Kingsville	Receiving		

=== No. 21 Midwestern State ===
No. 21 Midwestern State Mustangs at West Texas A&M Buffaloes – Game summary

Quarter	1	2	3	4	Total
No. 21 Mustangs	0	12	0	0	12
Buffaloes	0	0	15	0	15

at Buffalo Stadium, Canyon, Texas

- Date: November 6
- Game time: 6:00 p.m. CDT
- Game weather: Sunny
- Game attendance: 7,315
- Referee: Joe Horn
- Box score, Recap

Game information
First quarter
- No scoring plays

Second quarter

- MSU – Kylan Harrison 6-yard pass from Dillon Sterling-Cole (Ritse Vaes kick), 13:43. Mustangs 7–0. Drive: 3 plays, 43 yards, 0:52.
- MSU – Team safety, 5:13. Mustangs 9–0.
- MSU – Ritse Vaes 25-yard field goal, 0:03. Mustangs 12–0. Drive: 10 plays, 83 yards, 0:57.

Third quarter

- WT – Isaiah Smallwood 22-yard run (Cason Polivoda kick), 11:44. Mustangs 12–7. Drive: 4 plays, 44 yards, 0:54.
- WT – Nick Gerber 6-yard run (Nick Gerber pass to Noah Bogardus), 0:59. Buffaloes 15–12. Drive: 11 plays, 99 yards, 5:08.

Fourth quarter

- No scoring plays

Statistics	MSU	WT
First downs	22	20
Total yards	356	322
Rushing yards	106	205
Passing yards	250	117
Turnovers	3	1
Time of possession	27:28	32:32

Team	Category	Player	Statistics
Midwestern State	Passing	Dillon Sterling-Cole	26/45, 250 yards, TD, INT
Midwestern State	Rushing	Dillon Sterling-Cole	8 rushes, 44 yards
Midwestern State	Receiving	Jayden Moore	4 receptions, 62 yards
West Texas A&M	Passing	Nick Gerber	12/23, 117 yards, INT
West Texas A&M	Rushing	Jarrod Compton	30 rushes, 160 yards
West Texas A&M	Receiving	Noah Bogardus	3 receptions, 53 yards

=== Bethel (KS) ===
Bethel Threshers at West Texas A&M Buffaloes – Game summary

Quarter	1	2	3	4	Total
Threshers	9	0	0	0	9
Buffaloes	10	21	14	7	52

at Buffalo Stadium, Canyon, Texas

- Date: November 13
- Game time: 11:00 a.m. CST
- Game weather: Sunny
- Game attendance: 5,728
- Referee: Jason Hickey
- Box score, Recap

Statistics	BET	WT
First downs		
Total yards		
Rushing yards		
Passing yards		
Turnovers		
Time of possession		

Team	Category	Player	Statistics
Bethel	Passing		
Bethel	Rushing		
Bethel	Receiving		
West Texas A&M	Passing		
West Texas A&M	Rushing		
West Texas A&M	Receiving		
