= LeGrand Sports Complex =

Athletic complex in San Angelo, Texas

Coordinates: 31.435524°N 100.45818°W

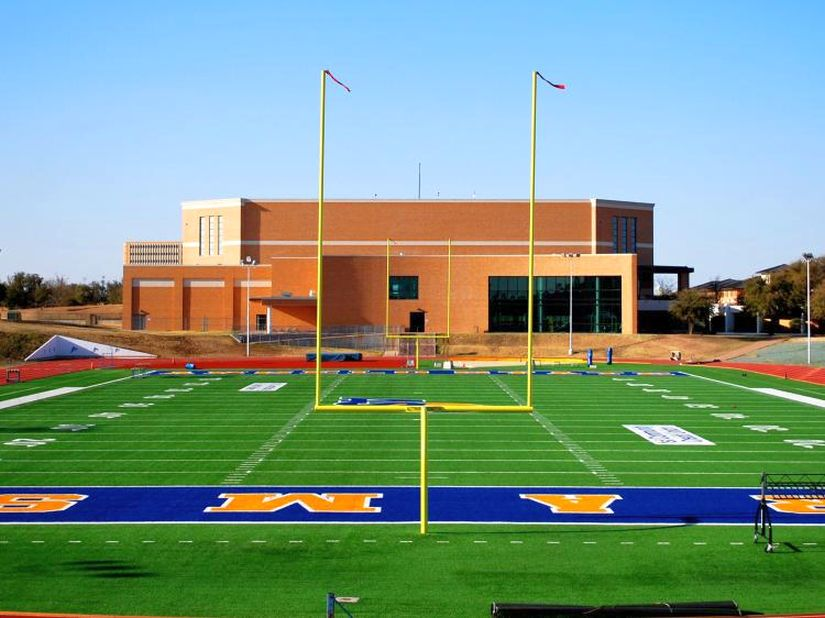
- LeGrand Stadium at 1st Community Credit Union Field
- Interactive map of LeGrand Sports Complex
- Former names: Multi-Sports Complex
- Location: San Angelo, Texas
- Owner: Angelo State University
- Capacity: 3,000

Tenant
- Angelo State University

The LeGrand Sports Complex is a Track and Field complex at Angelo State University in San Angelo, Texas. The complex has seating for 3,000 people. It is home to the Angelo State University Track and Field teams and the Angelo State Rams football team. It features a 400-meter all-weather track with 200-meter straightaway, throwing and jumping areas and full press box facilities. The complex is lighted for evening and night events and features a Daktronics scoreboard specifically designed for track and field with a clock display and 11 ft. video display. The facility is one of the premier track and field complexes in NCAA Division II athletics. Because of this it has hosted the Division II National Championships on five occasions including 1988, 1991, 1992, 2002 and 2009.

On October 1, 2008 the Texas Tech University System regents voted to rename the Multi-Sports Complex to the LeGrand Sports Complex in recognition of Dr. Robert and Jean Ann LeGrand’s support of Angelo State University. Dr. Robert LeGrand, a San Angelo Neurosurgeon, and Jean Ann LeGrand an ASU graduate have donated over 2.7 million to Angelo State University including a 200K donation to update the Sports Complex in preparation for the 2011 NCAA Division II National Track and Field Championships.

In June 2013 a $1.2 million construction project began to move the javelin runway to the upper field and the long jump and pole vault runways and pits outside of the track surface in order to install artificial synthetic turf on the playing field. The fields main purpose will be to improve the practice field for the Ram football team but also be used by various other teams and intramural sports. The field will be named for 1st Community Credit Union who paid for the majority of the privately funded project.

On April 22, 2018, the university opened 3-story press box to the stadium.
