= 2019 NCAA Division II Football Championship Game =

2019 NCAA Division II Football Championship
| West Florida Argonauts | Minnesota State Mavericks |
| (12–2) | (14–0) |
| Gulf South | Northern Sun |
| 48 | 40 |
| Head coach: Pete Shinnick | Head coach: Todd Hoffner |
| Seed 4 | Seed 3 |
| | 1 | 2 | 3 | 4 | Total |
|---|---|---|---|---|---|
| West Florida | 14 | 24 | 7 | 3 | 48 |
| Minnesota State | 14 | 7 | 8 | 11 | 40 |
- Date: December 21, 2019
- Season: 2019
- Stadium: McKinney ISD Stadium
- Location: McKinney, Texas
- Referee: Marcus Thornton
- Attendance: 3,415

United States TV coverage
- Network: ESPNU

The 2019 NCAA Division II Football Championship Game was a postseason college football game that determined a national champion in NCAA Division II for the 2019 season. It was played at McKinney ISD Stadium in McKinney, Texas, on December 21, 2019, with kickoff at 3:00 p.m. EST (2:00 p.m. local CST), and television coverage on ESPNU.

== Teams ==
The participants of the 2019 NCAA Division II Football Championship Game were the finalists of the 2019 Division II Playoffs, which began with four 7-team brackets to determine super region champions, who then qualified for the national semifinals. The game featured the winners of those national semifinal games: No. 4 seed West Florida and No. 3 seed Minnesota State. This was the first meeting between the two teams. West Florida defeated Minnesota State, 48–40 to win the 2019 NCAA Division II Football Championship.

=== National semifinals ===
Super region champions were seeded 1 to 4 for the national semifinals.

Semifinals; December 14; Hosted by higher seeded team
1 | Ferris State | 14
4 | West Florida | 28
2 | Slippery Rock | 15
3 | Minnesota State | 58

National Championship; December 21; McKinney ISD Stadium, McKinney, TX
4 | West Florida | 48
3 | Minnesota State | 40

== Game summary ==
2019 NCAA Division II Football Championship Game

| Quarter | 1 | 2 | 3 | 4 | Total |
|---|---|---|---|---|---|
| No. 4 West Florida | 14 | 24 | 7 | 3 | 48 |
| No. 3 Minnesota State | 14 | 7 | 8 | 11 | 40 |

at McKinney ISD Stadium • McKinney, Texas

- Date: Saturday, December 21, 2019
- Game time: 3:00 p.m. EST (2:00 p.m. CST)
- Game weather: Cloudy • Temperature: 47 °F (8 °C) • Wind: N 4 mph
- Game attendance: 3,415
- Referee: Marcus Thornton
- TV: ESPNU

Game information

First Quarter

- (9:22) UWF – Austin Reed 5 yard pass to Kevin Grant, Austin Williams kick (Drive: 13 plays, 72 yards, 5:38; West Florida 7–0)
- (6:09) MNST – Ryan Schlichte 38 yard pass to Justin Arnold, Luke Williams kick (Drive: 7 plays, 68 yards, 3:05; Tied 7–7)
- (3:38) UWF – Austin Reed 12 yard pass to Ka'Ron Ashley, Austin Williams kick (Drive: 5 plays, 69 yards, 2:24; West Florida 14–7)
- (0:53) MNST – Nate Gunn 2 yard rush, Luke Williams kick (Drive: 7 plays, 60 yards, 2:38; Tied 14–14)

Second Quarter

- (13:18) UWF – Austin Reed 2 yard pass to Quentin Randolph, Austin Williams kick (Drive: 7 plays, 59 yards, 2:26; West Florida 21–14)
- (10:58) UWF – Austin Williams 31 yard field goal (Drive: 5 plays, 21 yards, 1:20;West Florida 24–14)
- (6:21) MNST – Nate Gunn 6 yard rush, Luke Williams kick (Drive: 9 plays, 75 yards, 4:37; West Florida 24–21)
- (5:31) UWF – Austin Reed 34 yard pass to Quentin Randolph, Austin Williams kick (Drive: 3 plays, 72 yards, 0:44; West Florida 31–21)
- (0:18) UWF – Austin Reed 48 yard pass to Quentin Randolph, Austin Williams kick (Drive: 4 plays, 99 yards, 0:38; West Florida 38–21)

Third Quarter

- (8:12) UWF – Austin Reed 8 yard pass to Tate Lehtio, Austin Williams kick (Drive: 7 plays, 40 yards, 2:27; West Florida 45–21)
- (3:48) MNST – Kaleb Sleezer 15 yard punt block return, 2-point pass good (West Florida 45–29)

Fourth Quarter

- (14:39) UWF – Austin Williams 30 yard field goal (Drive: 6 plays, 33 yards, 1:24; West Florida 48–29)
- (9:52) MNST – Luke Williams 24 yard field goal (Drive: 10 plays, 45 yards, 2:36; West Florida 48–32)
- (4:03) MNST – Ryan Schlichte 7 yard pass to Shane Zylstra, 2-point pass good (Drive: 13 plays, 90 yards, 3:48; West Florida 48–40)

=== Statistics ===
| Statistics | UWF | MNST |
|---|---|---|
| First downs | 21 | 30 |
| Total yards | 561 | 562 |
| Rushes–yards | 16–38 | 42–143 |
| Passing yards | 523 | 419 |
| Passing: Comp–Att–Int | 33–54–1 | 31–48–0 |
| Time of possession | 27:32 | 32:28 |

| Team | Category | Player | Statistics |
|---|---|---|---|
| West Florida | Passing | Austin Reed | 33/54, 523 yards, 6 TD, 1 INT |
| West Florida | Rushing | Jaden Gardner | 7 receptions, 47 yards, |
| West Florida | Receiving | Quentin Randolph | 10 receptions, 254 yards, 3 TD |
| Minnesota State | Passing | Ryan Schlichte | 24/39, 309 yards, 2 TD |
| Minnesota State | Rushing | Ryan Schlichte | 9 carries, 57 yards |
| Minnesota State | Receiving | Justin Arnold | 13 receptions, 154 yards, 1 TD |
