= 2019 Mississippi College Choctaws football team =

American college football season

2019 Mississippi College Choctaws football
- Conference: Gulf South Conference
- Record: 5–5 (4–4 GSC)
- Head coach: John Bland (6th season)
- Offensive coordinator: Tommy Laurendine (2nd season)
- Defensive coordinator: Tony Gilbert (1st season)
- Home stadium: Robinson-Hale Stadium

2019 Gulf South Conference football standings
	Conf.			Overall
Team	W		L	W		L
No. 5 Valdosta State $^	8	–	0	10	–	1
No. 1 West Florida ^	7	–	1	13	–	2
Delta State	5	–	3	6	–	4
West Georgia	4	–	4	6	–	5
Mississippi College	4	–	4	5	–	5
West Alabama	3	–	5	6	–	5
Florida Tech	3	–	5	5	–	6
North Greenville	2	–	6	3	–	7
Shorter	0	–	8	1	–	10
$ – Conference champion; ^ – NCAA Division II playoff participant; Rankings from AFCA poll

The 2019 Mississippi College Choctaws football team represented Mississippi College during the 2019 NCAA Division II football season. They were led by sixth-year head coach John Bland. The Choctaws played their home games at Robinson-Hale Stadium and were members of the Gulf South Conference (GSC).

== Preseason ==
=== Gulf South Conference coaches poll ===
On August 1, 2019, the Gulf South Conference released their preseason coaches poll with the Choctaws predicted to finish in 8th place in the conference.

Predicted finish	Team	Votes (1st place)
1	Valdosta State	64 (8)
2	West Georgia	55
3	West Alabama	49
4	West Florida	44 (1)
5	Florida Tech	37
6	Delta State	28
7	North Greenville	24
8	Mississippi College	15
9	Shorter	8

=== Preseason All-Gulf South Conference Team ===
The Choctaws had two players at two positions selected to the preseason all-Gulf South Conference team.

Offense

Detric Hawthorn – AP

Defense

Turner Rotenberry – DB

Special teams

No players were selected

== Schedule ==
Mississippi College 2019 football schedule consists of five home and five away games in the regular season. The Choctaws will host GSC foes Delta State, Florida Tech, North Greenville, and Shorter, and will travel to Valdosta State, West Alabama, West Florida, West Georgia.

The Choctaws will host one of the two non-conference games against Albany State from the Southern Intercollegiate Athletic Conference, and will travel to Alcorn State, from the Southwestern Athletic Conference.

Two of the ten games will be broadcast on ESPN3 and ESPN+, as part of the Gulf South Conference Game of the Week.

Date	Time	Opponent	Site	TV	Result	Attendance
September 7	6:00 p.m.	at Alcorn State*	Spinks-Casem Stadium; Lorman, MS	Braves All-Access	L 7-45	7,358
September 14	7:00 p.m.	Albany State*	Robinson-Hale Stadium; Clinton, MS	Choctaws All-Access	W 24-17	3,347
September 21	7:00 p.m.	North Greenville	Robinson–Hale Stadium; Clinton, MS	Choctaws All-Access	W 39-27	3,134
September 28	6:00 p.m.	at West Florida	Blue Wahoos Stadium; Pensacola, FL	YurView Sports	L 21-27 ^{OT}	4,909
October 5	1:00 p.m.	at No. 1 Valdosta State	Bazemore–Hyder Stadium; Valdosta, GA		L 17-42	4,199
October 12	7:00 p.m.	Florida Tech	Robinson–Hale Stadium; Clinton, MS	Choctaws All-Access	W 34-14	2,507
October 26	3:00 p.m.	Shorter^{†}	Robinson–Hale Stadium; Clinton, MS	Choctaws All-Access	W 41-20	3,087
November 2	1:00 p.m.	at West Georgia	University Stadium; Carrollton, GA	ESPN+	L 21-35	2,023
November 9	12:00 p.m.	at West Alabama	Tiger Stadium; Livingston, AL	ESPN3	L 21-35	2,424
November 16	2:00 p.m.	Delta State	Robinson–Hale Stadium; Clinton, MS (rivalry)	Choctaws All-Access	W 37-13	5,341
*Non-conference game; ^{†}Homecoming; Rankings from AFCA Poll released prior to the game; All times are in Central time

Schedule source:
