= 2019 Florida Tech Panthers football team =

American college football season

2019 Florida Tech Panthers football
- Conference: Gulf South Conference
- Record: 5–6 (3–5 GSC)
- Head coach: Steve Englehart (7th season)
- Offensive coordinator: Jayson Martin (7th season)
- Defensive coordinator: Aaron Archie/Brian Vaughn (1st season)
- Home stadium: Florida Tech Panther Stadium

2019 Gulf South Conference football standings
	Conf.			Overall
Team	W		L	W		L
No. 5 Valdosta State $^	8	–	0	10	–	1
No. 1 West Florida ^	7	–	1	13	–	2
Delta State	5	–	3	6	–	4
West Georgia	4	–	4	6	–	5
Mississippi College	4	–	4	5	–	5
West Alabama	3	–	5	6	–	5
Florida Tech	3	–	5	5	–	6
North Greenville	2	–	6	3	–	7
Shorter	0	–	8	1	–	10
$ – Conference champion; ^ – NCAA Division II playoff participant; Rankings from AFCA Poll

The 2019 Florida Tech Panthers football team represented the Florida Institute of Technology (FIT) during the 2019 NCAA Division II football season. They were led by seventh-year head coach Steve Englehart. The Panthers played their home games at Florida Tech Panther Stadium, approximately one mile from the Florida Tech campus, and were members of the Gulf South Conference. In May 2020, Florida Tech shut down its football program due to budget cuts that followed the COVID-19 pandemic.

== Preseason ==
=== Gulf South Conference coaches poll ===
On August 1, 2019, the Gulf South Conference released their preseason coaches poll with the Panthers predicted to finish in 5th place in the conference.

Predicted finish	Team	Votes (1st place)
1	Valdosta State	64 (8)
2	West Georgia	55
3	West Alabama	49
4	West Florida	44 (1)
5	Florida Tech	37
6	Delta State	28
7	North Greenville	24
8	Mississippi College	15
9	Shorter	8

=== Preseason All-Gulf South Conference Team ===
The Panthers had four players at four positions selected to the preseason all-Gulf South Conference team.

Offense

No players were selected

Defense

John McClure – DB

Special teams

No players were selected

== Schedule ==
Florida Tech 2019 football schedule consists of five home and six away games in the regular season. The Panthers will host GSC foes Shorter, West Alabama, West Florida, and West Georgia, and will travel to Delta State, Mississippi College, North Greenville, and Valdosta State.

The Panthers will host one of the three non-conference games against Fort Valley State from the Southern Intercollegiate Athletic Conference (SIAC) and will travel to Newberry from the South Atlantic Conference (SAC) and Savannah State also from the SIAC.

Two of the eleven games will be broadcast on ESPN3 and ESPN+, as part of the Gulf South Conference Game of the Week.

The Week One game at Savannah State, originally scheduled for September 7, was moved back a day due to Hurricane Dorian.

The Week Seven game at Valdosta State, originally scheduled for a 3 P.M. kickoff on October 19, was moved back to a 7 P.M. start due to the forecast approach of Tropical Storm Nestor earlier in the day.

Date	Time	Opponent	Site	TV	Result	Attendance
September 8	2:00 p.m.	at Savannah State*	Ted Wright Stadium; Savannah, GA		W 23-22	3,028
September 14	1:00 p.m.	at Newberry*	Setzler Field; Newberry, SC		W 30-28	2,944
September 21	7:00 p.m.	at Delta State	McCool Stadium; Cleveland, MS	ESPN3	L 28-30	6,665
September 28	7:00 p.m.	West Georgia	Florida Tech Panther Stadium; Melbourne, FL		W 44-10	2,450
October 5	7:00 p.m.	Fort Valley State*	Florida Tech Panther Stadium; Melbourne, FL		L 29-33	2,400
October 12	8:00 p.m.	at Mississippi College	Robinson-Hale Stadium; Clinton, MS		L 14-34	2,507
October 19	7:00 p.m.	at No. 1 Valdosta State	Bazemore–Hyder Stadium; Valdosta, GA		L 28-55	4,631
October 26	1:00 p.m.	No. 20 West Florida^{†}	Florida Tech Panther Stadium; Melbourne, FL (Coastal Classic)	ESPN+	L 14-38	2,215
November 2	2:00 p.m.	West Alabama	Florida Tech Panther Stadium; Melbourne, FL		L 10-13	878
November 9	1:30 p.m.	at North Greenville	Younts Stadium; Tigerville, SC		W 17-14 ^{2OT}	3,744
November 16	2:00 p.m.	Shorter	Florida Tech Panther Stadium; Melbourne, FL		W 42-3	1,450
*Non-conference game; ^{†}Homecoming; Rankings from AFCA Poll released prior to the game; All times are in Eastern time

Schedule source:

=== Rankings ===
Ranking movements Legend: ██ Increase in ranking ██ Decrease in ranking — = Not ranked RV = Received votes
	Week												
Poll	Pre	1	2	3	4	5	6	7	8	9	10	11	Final
AFCA	RV	RV	RV	—	RV	—	—	—	—	—	—	—	—

== Game summaries ==
=== At Savannah State ===
	1	2	3	4	Total
Panthers	7	0	3	13	23
Tigers	0	6	0	16	22

=== At Newberry ===
	1	2	3	4	Total
Panthers	10	13	7	0	30
Wolves	0	14	0	14	28

=== At Delta State ===
	1	2	3	4	Total
Panthers	7	7	7	7	28
Statesmen	10	6	11	3	30

=== West Georgia ===
	1	2	3	4	Total
Wolves	7	3	0	0	10
Panthers	13	14	17	0	44

=== Fort Valley State ===
	1	2	3	4	Total
Wildcats	0	13	6	14	33
Panthers	10	10	6	3	29

=== At Mississippi College ===
	1	2	3	4	Total
Panthers	0	7	7	0	14
Choctaws	7	7	14	6	34

=== At Valdosta State ===
	1	2	3	4	Total
Panthers	14	7	0	7	28
Blazers	14	27	0	14	55

=== West Florida ===
	1	2	3	4	Total
Argonauts	7	10	14	7	38
Panthers	0	7	7	0	14

=== West Alabama ===
	1	2	3	4	Total
Tigers	0	3	0	10	13
Panthers	10	0	0	0	10

=== At North Greenville ===
	1	2	3	4	OT	2OT	Total
Panthers	7	7	0	0	0	3	17
Crusaders	0	0	7	7	0	0	14

=== Shorter ===
	1	2	3	4	Total
Hawks	0	3	0	0	3
Panthers	14	21	0	7	42

== Awards and milestones ==
=== Gulf South Conference honors ===
Five players from Florida Tech were honored as All-GSC selections by the league's coaches.

==== Gulf South Conference All-Conference First Team ====
- Evan Thompson, LB

==== Gulf South Conference All-Conference Second Team ====
- Miles Kelly, WR
- Kenny Hiteman, TE
- Tyrone Cromwell, DB
- John McClure, DB

==== Gulf South Conference Offensive Player of the Week ====
- September 30: Mike Diliello, QB

==== Gulf South Conference Freshman of the Week ====
- September 23: Mike Diliello, QB
- September 30: Mike Diliello, QB
