= 2019 Delta State Statesmen football team =

American college football season

2019 Delta State Statesmen football
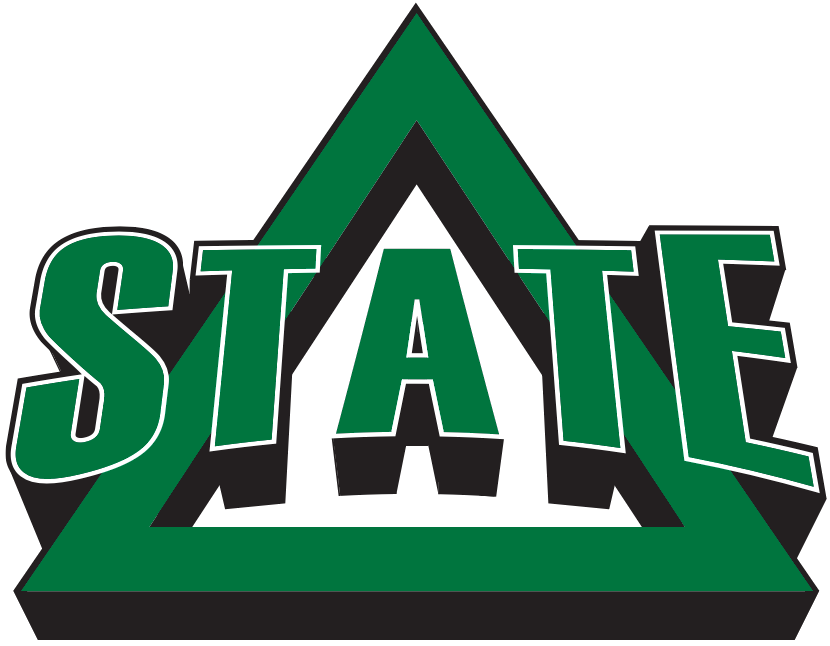
- Conference: Gulf South Conference
- Record: 6-4 (5-3 GSC)
- Head coach: Todd Cooley (7th season)
- Defensive coordinator: Kelvin Green (1st; 7th overall season season)
- Home stadium: Parker Field at Horace McCool Stadium

2019 Gulf South Conference football standings
| | Conf. | | | Overall |
| Team | W | | L | W | | L |
|---|---|---|---|---|---|---|
| No. 5 Valdosta State $^ | 8 | – | 0 | 10 | – | 1 |
| No. 1 West Florida ^ | 7 | – | 1 | 13 | – | 2 |
| Delta State | 5 | – | 3 | 6 | – | 4 |
| West Georgia | 4 | – | 4 | 6 | – | 5 |
| Mississippi College | 4 | – | 4 | 5 | – | 5 |
| West Alabama | 3 | – | 5 | 6 | – | 5 |
| Florida Tech | 3 | – | 5 | 5 | – | 6 |
| North Greenville | 2 | – | 6 | 3 | – | 7 |
| Shorter | 0 | – | 8 | 1 | – | 10 |
$ – Conference champion; ^ – NCAA Division II playoff participant; Rankings from AFCA Poll

The 2019 Delta State Statesmen football team represented Delta State University in the 2019 NCAA Division II football season. They were led by seventh-year head coach Todd Cooley. The Statesmen played their home games at McCool Stadium and were members of the Gulf South Conference.

== Preseason ==
=== Gulf South Conference coaches poll ===
On August 1, 2019, the Gulf South Conference released their preseason coaches poll with the Statesmen predicted to finish in 6th place in the conference.

| Predicted finish | Team | Votes (1st place) |
|---|---|---|
| 1 | Valdosta State | 64 (8) |
| 2 | West Georgia | 55 |
| 3 | West Alabama | 49 |
| 4 | West Florida | 44 (1) |
| 5 | Florida Tech | 37 |
| 6 | Delta State | 28 |
| 7 | North Greenville | 24 |
| 8 | Mississippi College | 15 |
| 9 | Shorter | 8 |

=== Preseason All-Gulf South Conference Team ===
The Statesmen had three players at three positions selected to the preseason all-Gulf South Conference team.

Offense

Innis Claud V – OG

Defense

Eric Sadler – DL

Special teams

Sam Barge – P

== Schedule ==
Delta State 2019 football schedule consists of five home and away games in the regular season. The Statesmen will host GSC foes Florida Tech, Valdosta State, West Alabama and West Georgia, and will travel to Mississippi College, North Greenville, Shorter, and West Florida.

The Statesmen will host one of the two non-conference games against Tusculum from the South Atlantic Conference and will travel to Grand Valley State from the Great Lakes Intercollegiate Athletic Conference.

Two of the ten games will be broadcast on ESPN3 and ESPN+, as part of the Gulf South Conference Game of the Week.

| Date | Time | Opponent | Site | TV | Result | Attendance |
|---|---|---|---|---|---|---|
| September 5 | 6:00 p.m. | Tusculum* | McCool Stadium; Cleveland, MS | Statesmen Sports Network | W 24-10 | 5,123 |
| September 14 | 6:00 p.m. | at No. 10 Grand Valley State* | Lubbers Stadium; Allendale, MI | ESPN3 | L 24-28 | 10,680 |
| September 21 | 6:00 p.m. | Florida Tech | McCool Stadium; Cleveland, MS | ESPN3 | W 30-28 | 6,665 |
| September 28 | 6:00 p.m. | at North Greenville | Younts Stadium; Tigerville, SC | North Greenville Sports Network | W 34-9 | 3,419 |
| October 5 | 6:00 p.m. | at West Florida | Blue Wahoos Stadium; Pensacola, FL | YurView Sports | L 3-48 | 6,088 |
| October 12 | 6:00 p.m. | No. 1 Valdosta State | McCool Stadium; Cleveland, MS | Statesmen Sports Network | L 13-34 | 3,165 |
| October 19 | 6:00 p.m. | West Alabama | McCool Stadium; Cleveland, MS | ESPN+ | W 14-7 | 3,167 |
| November 2 | 12:00 p.m. | at Shorter | Barron Stadium; Rome, GA | | W 38-6 | 1,028 |
| November 9 | 2:00 p.m. | West Georgia^{†} | McCool Stadium; Cleveland, MS | Statesmen Sports Network | W 35-20 | 5,165 |
| November 16 | 2:00 p.m. | at Mississippi College | Robinson-Hale Stadium; Clinton, MS (rivalry) | Choctaws All-Access | L 13-37 | 5,341 |
*Non-conference game; ^{†}Homecoming; Rankings from AFCA Poll released prior to the game; All times are in Central time

== Rankings ==
Ranking movements Legend: ██ Increase in ranking ██ Decrease in ranking — = Not ranked RV = Received votes
| | Week | | | | | | | | | | | | |
| Poll | Pre | 1 | 2 | 3 | 4 | 5 | 6 | 7 | 8 | 9 | 10 | 11 | Final |
|---|---|---|---|---|---|---|---|---|---|---|---|---|---|
| AFCA | — | — | — | RV | RV | — | — | — | — | — | — | — | — |
