= 2019 Southern Arkansas Muleriders football team =

American college football season

2019 Southern Arkansas Muleriders football

Heritage Bowl, L 13–20 vs. Eastern New Mexico
- Conference: Great American Conference
- Record: 8–4 (8–3 GAC)
- Head coach: Bill Keopple (11th season)
- Offensive coordinator: Landon Keopple (11th season)
- Offensive scheme: Spread
- Defensive coordinator: Chad Adams (2nd season)
- Base defense: 4–2–5
- Home stadium: Wilkins Stadium

2019 Great American Conference football standings
	Conf.			Overall
Team	W		L	W		L
No. 14 Ouachita Baptist $^	11	–	0	11	–	1
No. 15 Harding ^	10	–	1	10	–	2
Henderson State #	9	–	2	9	–	3
Southern Arkansas #	8	–	3	8	–	4
Oklahoma Baptist	7	–	4	7	–	4
Arkansas–Monticello	5	–	6	5	–	6
NW Oklahoma State	4	–	7	4	–	7
Arkansas Tech	3	–	8	3	–	8
East Central	3	–	8	3	–	8
SW Oklahoma State	3	–	8	3	–	8
Southern Nazarene	2	–	9	2	–	9
SE Oklahoma State	1	–	10	1	–	10
$ – Conference champion; ^ – NCAA Division II playoff participant; # – bowl participant (Southern Arkansas: Heritage Bowl, Henderson State: Live United Texarkana Bowl); Rankings from AFCA poll

The 2019 Southern Arkansas Muleriders football team represented Southern Arkansas University as a member of the Great American Conference (GAC) during the 2019 NCAA Division II football season. Led by 11th-year head coach Bill Keopple, the Muleriders played their home games at Rip Powell Field at Wilkins Stadium in Magnolia, Arkansas.

== Schedule ==
Date	Time	Opponent	Site	Result	Attendance
September 5	6:00 p.m.	at Southern Nazarene	SNU Stadium; Bethany, OK	W 34–14	1,237
September 14	6:00 p.m.	Oklahoma Baptist	Wilkins Stadium; Magnolia, AR	W 30–28	4,292
September 21	6:00 p.m.	No. 23 Harding	Wilkins Stadium; Magnolia, AR	L 0–31	6,287
September 28	6:00 p.m.	at Arkansas Tech	Thone Stadium; Russellville, AR	W 35–14	5,283
October 5	2:00 p.m.	Southwestern Oklahoma State	Wilkins Stadium; Magnolia, AR	W 42–20	3,190
October 12	2:00 p.m.	at Northwestern Oklahoma State	Ranger Field; Alva, OK	W 40–7	2,850
October 19	2:30 p.m.	SE Oklahoma State^{†}	Wilkins Stadium; Magnolia, AR	W 49–7	5,796
October 26	3:00 p.m.	at East Central	Koi Ishto Stadium; Ada, OK	W 24–23	3,156
November 2	2:00 p.m.	vs. No. 5 Ouachita Baptist	Memorial Stadium; El Dorado, AR	L 21–38	4,721
November 9	2:00 p.m.	at No. 22 Henderson State	Carpenter–Haygood Stadium; Arkadelphia, AR	L 31–38	3,054
November 16	2:00 p.m.	Arkansas–Monticello	Wilkins Stadium; Magnolia, AR (Battle of the Timberlands)	W 34–32	2,147
December 7	12:00 p.m.	vs. Eastern New Mexico*	Tiger Stadium; Corsicana, TX (Heritage Bowl)	L 13–20	1,500
*Non-conference game; ^{†}Homecoming; Rankings from AFCA Coaches Poll released prior to the game; All times are in Central time

== Personnel ==
=== Position key ===
Back	B	Center	C	Cornerback	CB	Defensive back	DB
Defensive end	DE	Defensive lineman	DL	Defensive tackle	DT	End	E
Fullback	FB	Guard	G	Halfback	HB	Kicker	K
Kickoff returner	KR	Offensive tackle	OT	Offensive lineman	OL	Linebacker	LB
Long snapper	LS	Punter	P	Punt returner	PR	Quarterback	QB
Running back	RB	Safety	S	Tight end	TE	Wide receiver	WR

=== Returning starters ===
Offense

Player	Class	Position
Austin Paatricia	Sophomore	Right Tackle
Drew Crawford	Senior	Right Guard
Trey Thomas	Senior	Center
Marshall Poppenhusen	Sophomore	Left Guard
Mason Grantz	Senior	Left tackle
Jaidon Parrish	Senior	Fullback
Dalton Wright	Senior	Tight End
Michael Ingram	Senior	Wide Receiver
Jared Lancaster	Senior	Wide Receiver

Defense

Player	Class	Position
Lorenzo Watkins	Senior	Cornerback
Stacy Lawrence	Senior	Safety
Brock Floyd	Senior	Safety
La'Montrick Turner	Senior	Safety
Antonio Washington	Junior	Defensive tackle
DeMarcus Pegue	Junior	Linebacker

Special teams

Player	Class	Position
Austin Wilkerson	Sophomore	Kicker
Jaidon Parrish	Senior	Long snapper

=== Coaching staff ===
Name	Position	Year entering
Bill Keopple	Head coach	11th
Chad Adams	Defensive coordinator	2nd
Landon Keopple	Offensive coordinator	11th
Boomer "El Llorón" Cunningham	Recruiting coordinator/offensive line	4th
Eriq Moore	Defensive backs/Strength and Conditioning	2nd
Rashad Pittman	Defensive line	2nd
Zach Parks	Graduate Assistant – Running backs/tight ends	1st
Tony Lombardo	Graduate Assistant – Defensive	1st
Wil Nicks	Graduate Assistant – Wide receivers	2nd
CJ Williams	Student Assistant Extraordinaire/Assistant Quarterbacks	5th
