= 2019 West Florida Argonauts football team =

American college football season

2019 West Florida Argonauts football

NCAA Division II champion

NCAA Division II Championship Game, W 48–40 vs. Minnesota State
- Conference: Gulf South Conference

Ranking
- AFCA: No. 1
- Record: 13–2 (7–1 GSC)
- Head coach: Pete Shinnick (4th season)
- Co-offensive coordinator: Kaleb Nobles (1st season)
- Defensive coordinator: Darian Dulin (3rd season)
- Home stadium: Blue Wahoos Stadium

2019 Gulf South Conference football standings
	Conf.			Overall
Team	W		L	W		L
No. 5 Valdosta State $^	8	–	0	10	–	1
No. 1 West Florida ^	7	–	1	13	–	2
Delta State	5	–	3	6	–	4
West Georgia	4	–	4	6	–	5
Mississippi College	4	–	4	5	–	5
West Alabama	3	–	5	6	–	5
Florida Tech	3	–	5	5	–	6
North Greenville	2	–	6	3	–	7
Shorter	0	–	8	1	–	10
$ – Conference champion; ^ – NCAA Division II playoff participant; Rankings from AFCA poll

The 2019 West Florida Argonauts football team represented the University of West Florida as a member of the Gulf South Conference (GSC) during the 2019 NCAA Division II football season. They were led by fourth-year head coach Pete Shinnick. The Argonauts played their home games at Blue Wahoos Stadium. The Argonauts won the 2019 NCAA Division II Football Championship by defeating Minnesota State, 48–40 in the 2019 NCAA Division II Football Championship Game.

== Preseason ==
=== Gulf South Conference coaches poll ===
On August 1, 2019, the Gulf South Conference released their preseason coaches poll with the Argonauts predicted to finish in 4th place in the conference.

Predicted finish	Team	Votes (1st place)
1	Valdosta State	64 (8)
2	West Georgia	55
3	West Alabama	49
4	West Florida	44 (1)
5	Florida Tech	37
6	Delta State	28
7	North Greenville	24
8	Mississippi College	15
9	Shorter	8

=== Preseason All-Gulf South Conference Team ===
The Argonauts had three players at two positions selected to the preseason all-Gulf South Conference team.

Offense

Samuel Antoine – OT

Defense

Trent Archie – LB

Andre Duncombe Jr. – LB

Special teams

No players were selected

== Schedule ==
West Florida 2019 football schedule consists of five home and five away games in the regular season. The Argonauts will host GSC foes Delta State, Mississippi College, North Greenville, and West Alabama, and will travel to Florida Tech, Shorter, Valdosta State, and West Georgia.

The Argonauts will host one of the two non-conference games against Virginia-Lynchburg and will travel to Carson–Newman from the South Atlantic Conference (SAC).

Two of the ten games will be broadcast on ESPN3 and ESPN+, as part of the Gulf South Conference Game of the Week.

Date	Time	Opponent	Rank	Site	TV	Result	Attendance
September 5	6:00 p.m.	at Carson–Newman*		Burke–Tarr Stadium; Jefferson City, TN	YouTube	L 13–20	4,027
September 14	12:00 p.m.	at Shorter		Barron Stadium; Rome, GA	ESPN3	W 42–14	1,177
September 21	6:00 p.m.	Virginia–Lynchburg*		Blue Wahoos Stadium; Pensacola, FL	YurView Sports	W 69–0	4,847
September 28	6:00 p.m.	Mississippi College		Blue Wahoos Stadium; Pensacola, FL	YurView Sports	W 27–21 ^{OT}	4,909
October 5	6:00 p.m.	Delta State^{†}		Blue Wahoos Stadium; Pensacola, FL	YurView Sports	W 48–3	6,088
October 19	1:00 p.m.	at West Georgia	No. 24	University Stadium; Carrollton, GA		W 30–2	1,092
October 26	12:00 p.m.	at Florida Tech	No. 20	Florida Tech Panther Stadium; Melbourne, FL (Coastal Classic)	ESPN+	W 38–14	2,215
November 2	4:00 p.m.	North Greenville	No. 20	Blue Wahoos Stadium; Pensacola, FL	YurView Sports	W 17–14	5,042
November 9	6:00 p.m.	at No. 1 Valdosta State	No. 20	Bazemore–Hyder Stadium; Valdosta, GA	ESPN3	L 21–26	6,002
November 16	4:00 p.m.	West Alabama	No. 22	Blue Wahoos Stadium; Pensacola, FL	YurView Sports	W 48–37	5,619
November 23	12:00 p.m.	at No. 16 Wingate*	No. 20	Irwin Belk Stadium; Wingate, NC (NCAA Division II First Round)	ESPN3	W 38–17	1,050
November 30	12:00 p.m.	at No. 1 Valdosta State*	No. 20	Bazemore–Hyder Stadium; Valdosta, GA (NCAA Division II Second Round)		W 38–35	4,261
December 7	12:00 p.m.	at No. 6 Lenoir–Rhyne*	No. 20	Moretz Stadium; Hickory, NC (NCAA Division II Quarterfinals)	Bears Sports Network	W 43–38	4,756
December 14	2:30 p.m.	at No. 2 Ferris State*	No. 20	Top Taggart Field; Big Rapids, MI (NCAA Division II Semifinals)	ESPN3	W 28–14	3,162
December 21	2:00 p.m.	vs. No. 4 Minnesota State*	No. 20	McKinney ISD Stadium; McKinney, TX (NCAA Division II Championship Game)	ESPNU	W 48–40	3,417
*Non-conference game; ^{†}Homecoming; Rankings from AFCA Poll released prior to the game; All times are in Central time

== Rankings ==
Ranking movements Legend: ██ Increase in ranking ██ Decrease in ranking — = Not ranked RV = Received votes
	Week												
Poll	Pre	1	2	3	4	5	6	7	8	9	10	11	Final
AFCA	RV	—	RV	RV	RV	25	24	20	20	20	22	20	1

== Roster ==
2019 West Florida Argonauts football team roster
Players
Coaches
Offense

Pos.	#	Name	Class
WR	1	Ka'Ron Ashley	RJr
WR	2	Rodney Coates	RJr
QB	3	Sam Vaughn	GS
RB	4	Jervon Newton	RSo
QB	5	Adrien Ciena	Fr
RB	5	Shomari Mason	Fr
QB	6	Cooper Harris	Fr
WR	7	Kenneth Channelle	RFr
WR	8	Demetri Burch	RSo
WR	9	Ian Edwards	RFr
QB	10	J.C. Robles	RSr
WR	11	Amari DuBose	RJr
QB	12	Corey Wilsher	Fr
QB	14	Austin Reed	RFr
WR	15	Kevin Grant	Sr
WR	16	Anthony Manning	RFr
RB	16	Codaryl Pandolfo	RSo
WR	17	Willie Baker	RSo
WR	18	Evan Mitchell	RSo
QB	19	Peyton Calhoun	RSo
RB	21	Jaden Gardner	RSo
RB	26	Keyshawn Young	Fr
RB	28	Seth Johnson	Fr
WR	29	Quentin Randolph	RSr
RB	32	Anthony Johnson Jr.	Jr
OL	50	Jacob Bruce	RFr
OL	52	Samuel Antoine	Sr
OL	55	Dalton Simpler	RSo
OL	58	Ethan Cruz	RSr
OL	61	Joe Wintrick	RSr
OL	63	Robby Parker	Fr
OL	65	Devin Gibson	RSr
OL	66	Heston Humphries	RFr
OL	67	Josh Del Grego	RSo
OL	68	Anthony Lord	RFr
OL	68	Drew Peterson	Fr
TE	70	Larry Dalla Betta	So
OL	70	Nash Nelson	Fr
OL	71	Max Lynch	RFr
OL	72	Nate Archie	RSo
OL	73	Riley Metheney	RSr
OL	74	Mike Dilla	Jr
OL	75	Edward Kinnon	RJr
OL	76	Oake Stipe	RFr
OL	78	Travion Clayton	RSo
OL	79	Marshall Elam	RFr
TE	80	Jacure' Jackson	RSo
WR	81	Winston Sweeting	So
WR	83	Stanton Johnson	RFr
TE	84	Ke'shawn Showers	RJr
TE	85	Jakobe Roberts	Jr
TE	86	Gage Krull	Sr
TE	87	Jaret Bruce	RSo
WR	88	Tate Lehtio	GS
WR	89	Brandon Lawrence	Fr
WR		Nate Howard	Fr
WR		Quan Laguerre	Jr
WR		Drew Luchey	Fr

Defense

Pos.	#	Name	Class
LB	2	Andre Duncombe Jr.	RSr
DB	3	Marcus Clayton	RJr
LB	4	Gael Laurent	RFr
DB	6	Kion Holder	Jr
DB	7	D'Anthony Bell	RJr
DB	8	Sharod Oliver	So
LB	9	Joshua Smiley	RSr
DB	10	De'Mareyae Givens	Jr
LB	11	Chanler Ferguson	RSo
DL	13	Quentin Peeples	RSo
DB	14	T.J. Williams	RFr
LB	15	Khalib Gilmore	Fr
DB	16	T.J. Jackson	Fr
DB	17	Rayne Tanega-Doster	Fr
DB	18	Henry Montgomery	RSr
LB	19	Kedrick Bradley	GS
DB	21	Diarva Brown	Jr
DB	21	Jordan Parker	RFr
LB	22	Derontae Jordan	RSo
DB	23	David Richardson	Sr
LB	24	Trent Archie	RSr
DB	25	Antoine Rolle	RFr
LB	27	Jerquan Newton	RSo
DB	28	Carl Willis	Fr
DB	31	Terry Limehouse Jr.	RSo
LB	31	Trey Mathews	RJr
DB	32	Jerel Ricketts	Sr
LB	33	De'Marco Artis	RSo
LB	35	Noah Biggs	RSo
DB	36	Fred Billy	So
LB	38	C.J. Williams	So
LB	39	Nate Holloway	Sr
LB	41	Jeramy Worthen	Jr
LB	43	Chris Sakamoto	RSr
DL	45	Aidan Swett	RFr
DL	49	Chris Hawkins	RJr
DL	51	Brandon Penerton	Jr
DL	53	Stephen Mathews	Sr
DL	54	Daniel Fisteac	RSr
DL	59	Myles Meyer	Jr
DL	62	Brendan Cotilla-Delgado	Jr
DL	90	Matthew Gotel	Jr
DL	91	Kimani Keith	RJr
DL	92	Daryl Wilson	Sr
DL	93	Cary Samedi	Jr
DL	94	Alex Wilcox	RSo
DL	95	Ryan Birge	RJr
DL	96	Andrew Wilcox	RSo
DL	97	TJ Kelly	Jr
DL	98	Ty Cox	RSr
DL	99	Ian Bush	GS
DL		Nick Lucky	Fr
LB		Onelio Rios	Fr
LB		DeJay Robinson	RFr
LB		Peyton Xayasone	RFr

Special teams

Pos.	#	Name	Class
K	1	Austin Williams	Sr
K	10	Andrew Brickweg	RFr
P	12	Dawson Hamlin	So
P	37	Colton Norris	Jr
PK	42	Alex Virgilio	RFr
PK	46	Hunter Busen	Fr
LS	47	Wyatt Adams	Fr
LS	48	Cole Olson	Fr

Head coach

- Pete Shinnick

Coordinators/assistant coaches

- Steve Saulnier – Assistant Head Coach/Offensive Line
- Darian Dulin – Defensive Coordinator/Defensive Backs
- Alex Krutsch – Recruiting Coordinator/Defensive Line
- Alvance Robinson – Assistant Coach/Wide Receivers
- Kylle Shoemaker – Special Teams Coordinator/Linebackers
- Kaleb Nobles – Director of Football Operations/Quarterbacks
- Matt Mendez – Graduate Assistant/Tight Ends
- Jordan Remsza – Graduate Assistant/Outside Linebacker
- Jalen Samuel – Graduate Assistant/Cornerbacks
- Drew Tranum – Graduate Assistant/Equipment
- Kyle Hoffman – Volunteer Assistant - Defense
- Luke Jackson – Volunteer Assistant - Special Teams
- Nick Belz – Student Assistant Coach - Offense
- Leroy Wilson – Student Assistant Coach - Running Backs
- Kerlange Bien-Aime – Student Equipment Intern
- Nay Dixon – Student Equipment Intern

Legend

- (C) Team captain
- (S) Suspended
- (I) Ineligible
- Injured
- Redshirt

Roster
