= Rodney Coates =

American football player

Profile
- Position: Wide receiver

Personal information
- Born: Grove Hill, Alabama
- Listed height: 6 ft 2 in (1.88 m)
- Listed weight: 195 lb (88 kg)

Career information
- High school: Clarke County (Grove Hill, Alabama)
- College: West Florida (2015–2021)
- NFL draft: 2022: undrafted

Awards and highlights
- NCAA D2 champion (2019)

Rodney Coates is an American football wide receiver. He played college football at West Florida where he won the NCAA Division II Football Championship in 2019.

== Early life ==
Coates grew up in Grove Hill, Alabama. He attended Clarke County High School where he was a Two-time all-county selection in football and a three year starter in basketball.

== College career ==
Coates played college football at University of West Florida (UWF) from 2015 to 2021. Although he redshirted in 2015 and sat out the 2018 season, he finished with 93 career catches for 1,376 yards and 15 TD for UWF.

== Professional career ==
After going undrafted in the 2022 NFL draft, Coates attended rookie minicamp on a tryout basis with the Seattle Seahawks in May 2022.
