= 2019 Valdosta State Blazers football team =

American college football season

2019 Valdosta State Blazers football

GSC champion

NCAA Division II Second Round, L 35–38 vs. West Florida
- Conference: Gulf South Conference

Ranking
- AFCA: No. 5
- Record: 10–1 (8–0 GSC)
- Head coach: Gary Goff (1st season)
- Defensive coordinator: Lee Stalker (1st season)
- Home stadium: Bazemore–Hyder Stadium

2019 Gulf South Conference football standings
	Conf.			Overall
Team	W		L	W		L
No. 5 Valdosta State $^	8	–	0	10	–	1
No. 1 West Florida ^	7	–	1	13	–	2
Delta State	5	–	3	6	–	4
West Georgia	4	–	4	6	–	5
Mississippi College	4	–	4	5	–	5
West Alabama	3	–	5	6	–	5
Florida Tech	3	–	5	5	–	6
North Greenville	2	–	6	3	–	7
Shorter	0	–	8	1	–	10
$ – Conference champion; ^ – NCAA Division II playoff participant; Rankings from AFCA Poll

The 2019 Valdosta State Blazers football team represented Valdosta State University as a member of the Gulf South Conference (GSC) during the 2019 NCAA Division II football season. They were led by first-year head coach Gary Goff. The Blazers played their home games at Bazemore–Hyder Stadium in Valdosta, Georgia.

Valdosta State entered the 2019 season as defending NCAA Division II champions and the favorite to win the conference. The Blazers finished the regular season undefeated with an overall record of 10–0 and a mark of 8–0 in GSC play, winning the conference title. In the NCAA Division II football playoffs, Valdosta State was upset in the second round by eventual national champion West Florida.

== Schedule ==
Date	Time	Opponent	Rank	Site	TV	Result	Attendance
September 7	7:00 p.m.	at Albany State*	No. 1	Albany State University Coliseum; Albany, GA		W 38–3	5,011
September 14	6:00 p.m.	Ohio Dominican*	No. 1	Bazemore–Hyder Stadium; Valdosta, GA	ESPN3	W 48–21	5,065
September 21	7:00 p.m.	No. 20 West Alabama	No. 1	Bazemore–Hyder Stadium; Valdosta, GA	WALB	W 44–27	5,792
September 28	6:00 p.m.	at Shorter	No. 1	Barron Stadium; Rome, GA	ESPN+	W 44–7	1,471
October 5	2:00 p.m.	Mississippi College	No. 1	Bazemore–Hyder Stadium; Valdosta, GA		W 42–17	4,199
October 12	7:00 p.m.	at Delta State	No. 1	McCool Stadium; Cleveland, MS		W 34–13	3,165
October 19	7:00 p.m.	Florida Tech^{†}	No. 1	Bazemore–Hyder Stadium; Valdosta, GA		W 55–28	4,631
October 26	4:00 p.m.	at North Greenville	No. 1	Younts Stadium; Tigerville, SC		W 20–15	2,437
November 9	7:00 p.m.	No. 20 West Florida	No. 1	Bazemore–Hyder Stadium; Valdosta, GA	ESPN3	W 26–21	6,002
November 16	7:00 p.m.	at West Georgia	No. 1	University Stadium; Carrollton, GA (rivalry)	ESPN3	W 42–14	3,161
November 30	1:00 p.m.	No. 20 West Florida*	No. 1	Bazemore–Hyder Stadium; Valdosta, GA (NCAA Division II Second Round)		L 35–38	4,261
*Non-conference game; ^{†}Homecoming; Rankings from AFCA Poll released prior to the game; All times are in Eastern time

== Rankings ==
Ranking movements Legend: ██ Increase in ranking ██ Decrease in ranking ( ) = First-place votes
	Week												
Poll	Pre	1	2	3	4	5	6	7	8	9	10	11	Final
AFCA	1 (29)	1 (31)	1 (31)	1 (30)	1 (30)	1 (30)	1 (30)	1 (30)	1 (29)	1 (29)	1 (28)	1 (30)	5
D2Football	1	1	1	1	1	1	1	1	1	1	1	1	5
