= 2019 West Georgia Wolves football team =

American college football season

2019 West Georgia Wolves football
- Conference: Gulf South Conference
- Record: 6–5 (4–4 GSC)
- Head coach: David Dean (3rd season)
- Offensive coordinator: Graham Craig (1st season)
- Defensive coordinator: Dustin Landry (2nd season)
- Home stadium: University Stadium

2019 Gulf South Conference football standings
	Conf.			Overall
Team	W		L	W		L
No. 5 Valdosta State $^	8	–	0	10	–	1
No. 1 West Florida ^	7	–	1	13	–	2
Delta State	5	–	3	6	–	4
West Georgia	4	–	4	6	–	5
Mississippi College	4	–	4	5	–	5
West Alabama	3	–	5	6	–	5
Florida Tech	3	–	5	5	–	6
North Greenville	2	–	6	3	–	7
Shorter	0	–	8	1	–	10
$ – Conference champion; ^ – NCAA Division II playoff participant; Rankings from AFCA Poll

The 2019 West Georgia Wolves football team represented the University of West Georgia as a member of the Gulf South Conference (GSC) during the 2019 NCAA Division II football season. They were led by third-year head coach David Dean. The Wolves played their home games at University Stadium in Carrollton, Georgia.

Looking to build on the successes of the 2018 campaign, West Georgia entered the 2019 season to place second in the conference behind Valdosta State. They finished the season with a record of 6–5 (4–4 in the GSC).

== Schedule ==
Date	Time	Opponent	Rank	Site	TV	Result	Attendance
September 7	12:00 p.m.	at Catawba*	No. 15	Shuford Stadium; Salisbury, NC		W 37–9	2,120
September 14	7:00 p.m.	at Limestone*	No. 14	The Reservation; Gaffney, SC		W 24–14	3,513
September 21	7:00 p.m.	Albany State*	No. 15	University Stadium; Carrollton, GA		L 14–26	5,687
September 28	7:00 p.m.	at Florida Tech		Florida Tech Panther Stadium; Melbourne, FL		L 10–44	2,450
October 5	12:00 p.m.	Shorter		University Stadium; Carrollton, GA		W 44–34	1,907
October 12	7:00 p.m.	at North Greenville		Younts Stadium; Tigerville, SC		W 42–21	2,421
October 19	2:00 p.m.	No. 24 West Florida^{†}		University Stadium; Carrollton, GA		L 2–30	1,092
October 26	2:00 p.m.	at West Alabama		Tiger Stadium; Livingston, AL	ESPN3	W 33–17	2,053
November 2	2:00 p.m.	Mississippi College		University Stadium; Carrollton, GA		W 35–21	2,023
November 9	3:00 p.m.	at Delta State		McCool Stadium; Cleveland, MS		L 20–35	5,165
November 16	7:00 p.m.	Valdosta State		University Stadium; Carrollton, GA (rivalry)	ESPN3	L 14–42	3,161
*Non-conference game; ^{†}Homecoming; Rankings from AFCA Poll released prior to the game; All times are in Eastern time

== Rankings ==
Ranking movements Legend: ██ Increase in ranking ██ Decrease in ranking — = Not ranked RV = Received votes
	Week												
Poll	Pre	1	2	3	4	5	6	7	8	9	10	11	Final
AFCA	15	14	15	RV	—	—	—	—	—	—	—	—	—
