= Todd Hoffner =

American football player and coach (born 1966)

Current position
- Title: Head coach
- Team: Minnesota State
- Conference: NSIC
- Record: 161–42

Biographical details
- Born: June 17, 1966 (age 60)

Playing career
- c. 1988: Valley City State
- Position: Cornerback

Coaching career (HC unless noted)
- 1991–1998: Wisconsin–Stevens Point (assistant)
- 1999–2005: Wisconsin–Eau Claire
- 2006–2007: South Dakota (OC)
- 2008–2011: Minnesota State
- 2014–present: Minnesota State

Head coaching record
- Overall: 203–70
- Bowls: 1–0
- Tournaments: 16–11 (NCAA D-II playoffs)

Accomplishments and honors

Championships
- 1 WIAC (2001); 8 NSIC (2011, 2014–2015, 2017–2019, 2022, 2026); 11 NSIC South Division (2008–2009, 2011, 2014–2015, 2017–2019, 2022, 2025–2026)

Awards
- NCIS Coach of the Year (2009)

Todd Hoffner (born June 17, 1966) is an American college football coach and former player. He is the head football coach for Minnesota State University, Mankato, a position he held from 2008 to 2011 and resumed in 2014. Hoffner was the head football coach at the University of Wisconsin–Eau Claire from 1999 to 2005. He was an assistant football coach at University of Wisconsin–Stevens Point from 1991 to 1998 and served as the offensive coordinator at the University of South Dakota from 2006 to 2007. Hoffner played college football and ran track at Valley City State University, from which he graduated in 1989. He is a native of Esmond, North Dakota.

== Coaching career ==
In August 2012 Hoffner was charged by local authorities after a staff member at Minnesota State discovered videos of his naked children on a cell phone that was issued to Hoffner by the university. Hoffner was removed from his position as head football coach and placed on administrative leave. The charges were dismissed in December 2012. The judge who dismissed the charges ruled that the videos of the children amounted to nothing more than them acting silly after a bath. Hoffner was later fired by Minnesota State. In January 2014, he was hired by Minot State University to serve as their head football coach. In April 2014, Hoffner was reinstated in his position at Minnesota State after an arbitrator ruled in his favor. Minnesota State destroyed notes from its controversial investigation of Hoffner, and the Minnesota legislative auditor’s office meanwhile said it was “surprised” that the school’s investigator, an affirmative action officer, “destroyed her contemporaneous interview notes” when she conducted an investigation for Richard Davenport, the college's president. The school's investigator conducted flawed interviews in which questioning was not recorded or conducted under oath.

Hoffner received Division II Region 5 Coach of the Year honors in December 2014 from the American Football Coaches Association. Under Hoffner's guidance in 2014, the Minnesota State University Mavericks won their second consecutive NSIC Championship.

== Head coaching record ==
Year	Team	Overall	Conference	Standing	Bowl/playoffs	AFCA^{#}	D2^{°}
Wisconsin–Eau Claire Blugolds (Wisconsin Intercollegiate Athletic Conference) (1999–2005)
1999	Wisconsin–Eau Claire	2–8	2–5	T–6th			
2000	Wisconsin–Eau Claire	6–4	4–3	4th			
2001	Wisconsin–Eau Claire	8–2	5–2	T–1st			
2002	Wisconsin–Eau Claire	8–2	5–2	2nd			
2003	Wisconsin–Eau Claire	5–5	4–3	T–4th			
2004	Wisconsin–Eau Claire	7–3	4–3	T–2nd			
2005	Wisconsin–Eau Claire	6–4	5–2	2nd			
Wisconsin–Eau:		42–28	29–20				
Minnesota State Mavericks (Northern Sun Intercollegiate Conference) (2008–2011)
2008	Minnesota State	9–3	9–1 / 5–1	2nd / T–1st (South)	L NCAA Division II First Round	23	
2009	Minnesota State	10–2	9–1 / 6–0	2nd / T–1st (South)	L NCAA Division II First Round	12	
2010	Minnesota State	6–5	5–5 / 3–3	T–7th / 4th (South)			
2011	Minnesota State	9–3	8–2 / 6–0	T–1st / 1st (South)	W Mineral Water		
Minnesota State Mavericks (Northern Sun Intercollegiate Conference) (2014–present)
2014	Minnesota State	14–1	11–0 / 7–0	T–1st / 1st (South)	L NCAA Division II Championship	2	
2015	Minnesota State	10–2	10–1 / 6–1	1st / T–1st (South)	L NCAA Division II First Round	13	
2016	Minnesota State	8–3	8–3 / 5–2	T–3rd / T–2nd (South)			
2017	Minnesota State	13–1	11–0 / 7–0	1st / 1st (South)	L NCAA Division II Quarterfinal	4	
2018	Minnesota State	13–1	11–0 / 7–0	T–1st / 1st (South)	L NCAA Division II Semifinal	3	
2019	Minnesota State	14–1	11–0 / 7–0	1st / 1st (South)	L NCAA Division II Championship	2	
2020–21	No team—COVID-19						
2021	Minnesota State	6–5	6–5 / 2–4	8th / 5th (South)			
2022	Minnesota State	10–3	9–2 / 5–1	T–1st / T–1st (South)	L NCAA Division II Second Round	14	
2023	Minnesota State	9–3	8–2	T–2nd	L NCAA Division II First Round	21	20
2024	Minnesota State	11–4	7–3	T–2nd	L NCAA Division II Semifinal	7	5
2025	Minnesota State	10–4	7–3 / 5–1	T–3rd / T–1st (South)	L NCAA Division II Quarterfinal	8	7
2026	Minnesota State	9–1	8–1 / 5–1				
Minnesota State:		161–42	138–29				
Total:		203–70					
National championship Conference title Conference division title or championship game berth
