= 2025 Towson Tigers football team =

American college football season

2025 Towson Tigers football
- Conference: CAA Football
- Record: 6–6 (4–4 CAA)
- Head coach: Pete Shinnick (3rd season)
- Offensive coordinator: Adam Neugebauer (1st season)
- Defensive coordinator: Darian Dulin (3rd season)
- Home stadium: Johnny Unitas Stadium

2025 Coastal Athletic Association Football Conference standings
| | Conf. | | | Overall |
| Team | W | | L | W | | L |
|---|---|---|---|---|---|---|
| No. 11 Rhode Island $^ | 8 | – | 0 | 11 | – | 3 |
| No. 4т Villanova ^ | 7 | – | 1 | 12 | – | 3 |
| No. 23 New Hampshire ^ | 6 | – | 2 | 8 | – | 5 |
| No. 22 Monmouth | 6 | – | 2 | 9 | – | 3 |
| William & Mary | 6 | – | 2 | 7 | – | 5 |
| Maine | 5 | – | 3 | 6 | – | 6 |
| Elon | 4 | – | 4 | 6 | – | 6 |
| Stony Brook | 4 | – | 4 | 6 | – | 6 |
| Towson | 4 | – | 4 | 6 | – | 6 |
| North Carolina A&T | 2 | – | 6 | 2 | – | 10 |
| Campbell | 2 | – | 6 | 2 | – | 10 |
| Bryant | 1 | – | 7 | 3 | – | 9 |
| Albany | 1 | – | 7 | 2 | – | 10 |
| Hampton | 0 | – | 8 | 2 | – | 10 |
$ – Conference champion; ^ – FCS playoff participant; Rankings from STATS Poll

The 2025 Towson Tigers football team represented Towson University as a member of the Coastal Athletic Association Football Conference (CAA) during the 2025 NCAA Division I FCS football season. They were led by third-year head coach Pete Shinnick and played their home games at Johnny Unitas Stadium located in Towson, Maryland.

== Schedule ==
| Date | Time | Opponent | Site | TV | Result | Attendance |
|---|---|---|---|---|---|---|
| August 28 | 7:00 p.m. | at Norfolk State* | William "Dick" Price Stadium; Norfolk, VA | ESPNU | W 27–7 | 1,469 |
| September 6 | 7:00 p.m. | at Morgan State* | Hughes Stadium; Baltimore, Maryland (The Battle for Greater Baltimore) | ESPN+ | W 27–22 | 8,137 |
| September 13 | 12:00 p.m. | at Maryland* | SECU Stadium; College Park, MD | Peacock | L 17–44 | 36,780 |
| September 20 | 6:00 p.m. | Youngstown State* | Johnny Unitas Stadium; Towson, MD | FloFootball | L 28–31 | 6,042 |
| September 27 | 1:00 p.m. | at Bryant | Beirne Stadium; Smithfield, RI | FloFootball | W 26–24 | 1,200 |
| October 4 | 4:00 p.m. | Elon | Johnny Unitas Stadium; Towson, MD | FloFootball | L 3–17 | 6,163 |
| October 11 | 2:00 p.m. | No. 12 Monmouth^{†} | Johnny Unitas Stadium; Towson, MD | FloFootball | L 31–42 | 5,487 |
| October 25 | 3:30 p.m. | at Stony Brook | Kenneth P. LaValle Stadium; Stony Brook, NY | FloFootball | L 19–27 | 6,701 |
| November 1 | 12:00 p.m. | at North Carolina A&T | Truist Stadium; Greensboro, NC | FloFootball | W 62–9 | 5,474 |
| November 8 | 1:00 p.m. | No. 10 Villanova | Johnny Unitas Stadium; Towson, MD | FloFootball | L 10–28 | 5,667 |
| November 15 | 1:00 p.m. | at Albany | Tom & Mary Casey Stadium; Albany, NY | FloFootball | W 36–19 | 2,207 |
| November 22 | 1:00 p.m. | Campbell | Johnny Unitas Stadium; Towson, MD | FloFootball | W 35–31 | 3,914 |
*Non-conference game; ^{†}Homecoming; Rankings from STATS Poll released prior to the game; All times are in Eastern time

== Game summaries ==
=== at Norfolk State ===
Towson Tigers (0-0) at Norfolk State Spartans (0-0) – Game summary

| Quarter | 1 | 2 | 3 | 4 | Total |
|---|---|---|---|---|---|
| Tigers | 10 | 3 | 0 | 14 | 27 |
| Spartans | 0 | 0 | 0 | 7 | 7 |

at William "Dick" Price Stadium • Norfolk, VA

- Date: August 28
- Game time: 7:00 p.m. EDT
- Game attendance: 1,469
- Referee: Jason Soistman
- TV announcers (ESPNU): Tiffany Greene (play-by-play) and Jay Walker (analyst)

Game information

First quarter

- TOW – Jaceon Doss 33-yard pass from Andrew Indorf (Caden Williams kick), 10:37. Tigers 7–0. Drive: 8 plays, 76 yards, 3:09.
- TOW – Caden Williams 24-yard field goal, 2:45. Tigers 10–0. Drive: 11 plays, 43 yards, 5:20.

Second quarter

- TOW – Caden Williams 50-yard field goal, 10:41. Tigers 13–0. Drive: 11 plays, 43 yards, 5:11.

Third quarter

No scoring plays.

Fourth quarter

- NORF – Jaylen Laudermilk 8-yard run (Evan Helfrich kick), 14:17. Tigers 13–7. Drive: 6 plays, 43 yards, 0:43.
- TOW – Zay Perkins 36-yard pass from Andrew Indorf (Caden Williams kick), 11:06. Tigers 20–7. Drive: 8 plays, 67 yards, 3:02.
- TOW – John Dunmore 15-yard pass from Andrew Indorf (Caden Williams kick), 3:15. Tigers 27–7. Drive: 6 plays, 33 yards, 3:06.

| Statistics | TOW | NORF |
|---|---|---|
| First downs | 18 | 16 |
| Total yards | 323 | 279 |
| Rushing yards | 136 | 39 |
| Passing yards | 187 | 240 |
| Passing: Comp–Att–Int | 14–26–0 | 21–31–0 |
| Time of possession | 31:05 | 27:35 |

| Team | Category | Player | Statistics |
|---|---|---|---|
| Towson | Passing | Andrew Indorf | 14/26, 187 yards, 3 TD |
| Towson | Rushing | Kemarrion Battles | 16 carries, 79 yards |
| Towson | Receiving | John Dunmore | 5 receptions, 61 yards, TD |
| Norfolk State | Passing | Otto Kuhns | 19/27, 219 yards |
| Norfolk State | Rushing | Kevon King | 11 carries, 30 yards |
| Norfolk State | Receiving | Dresean Kendrick | 11 receptions, 125 yards |

=== at Morgan State (The Battle for Greater Baltimore) ===
Towson Tigers (1-0) vs. Morgan State Bears (0-1) – Game summary

| Quarter | 1 | 2 | 3 | 4 | Total |
|---|---|---|---|---|---|
| Tigers | 7 | 14 | 0 | 6 | 27 |
| Bears | 3 | 13 | 0 | 6 | 22 |

at Hughes Stadium • Baltimore, MD

- Date: September 6
- Game time: 7:00 p.m. EDT
- Game weather: Cloudy
- Game attendance: 8,137
- Referee: Derek Hatten
- TV announcers (ESPN+): Phil Schoener (play-by-play) and Emory Hunt (analyst)

Game information

First Quarter

- (4:55) MORG – Sahr Gbundema 38-yard field goal (Drive: 8 plays, 41 yards, 3:25; Morgan State 3–0)
- (4:40) TOW – Lukkas London 96-yard kickoff return, Caden Williams kick (Towson 7–3)

Second Quarter

- (13:54) TOW – Myles Brodie 66-yard interception, Caden Williams kick (Towson 14–3)
- (9:24) MORG – Matt Lowe 5-yard pass from Kobe Muasau, Sahr Gbundema kick (Drive: 8 plays, 63 yards, 4:22; Towson 14–10)
- (3:02) MORG – Jason Collins Jr. 3-yard run (Drive: 9 plays, 60 yards, 4:18; Morgan State 16–14)
- (1:20) TOW – Kemarrion Battles 2-yard run, Caden Williams kick (Drive: 8 plays, 78 yards, 1:37; Towson 21–16)

Third Quarter

No scoring plays

Fourth Quarter

- (4:22) MORG – Jason Collins Jr. 2-yard run (Drive: 9 plays, 52 yards, 3:55; Morgan State 22–21)
- (0:24) TOW – John Dunmore 18-yard pass from Andrew Indorf (Drive: 13 plays, 65 yards, 3:58; Towson 27–22)

| Statistics | TOW | MORG |
|---|---|---|
| First downs | 13 | 20 |
| Total yards | 249 | 417 |
| Rushing yards | 63 | 203 |
| Passing yards | 186 | 214 |
| Passing: Comp–Att–Int | 18–23–0 | 17–28–1 |
| Time of possession | 24:29 | 35:31 |

| Team | Category | Player | Statistics |
|---|---|---|---|
| Towson | Passing | Andrew Indorf | 18/23, 186 yards, TD |
| Towson | Rushing | Kemarrion Battles | 14 carries, 53 yards, TD |
| Towson | Receiving | John Dunmore | 6 receptions, 67 yards, TD |
| Morgan State | Passing | Kobe Muasau | 17/28, 214 yards, TD, INT |
| Morgan State | Rushing | Jason Collins Jr. | 28 carries, 134 yards, 2 TD |
| Morgan State | Receiving | Malique Leatherbury | 4 receptions, 42 yards |

=== at Maryland (FBS) ===
Towson Tigers (2-0) at Maryland Terrapins (FBS) (2-0) – Game summary

| Quarter | 1 | 2 | 3 | 4 | Total |
|---|---|---|---|---|---|
| Tigers | 0 | 0 | 7 | 10 | 17 |
| Terrapins (FBS) | 17 | 17 | 7 | 3 | 44 |

at SECU Stadium • College Park, MD

- Date: September 13
- Game time: 12:00 PM EDT
- Game weather: Sunny • Temperature: 77 °F (25 °C) • Wind: SW at 3 miles per hour (4.8 km/h)
- Game attendance: 36,780
- Referee: David Siegle
- TV announcers (Peacock): Michael Grady (play-by-play), Michael Robinson (analyst) and Caroline Pineda (sideline)

Game information

First Quarter

- (11:43) MD – Sean O'Haire 37-yard field goal (Drive: 5 plays, 14 yards, 1:42; Maryland 3–0)
- (8:11) MD – DeJuan Williams 2-yard run, Sean O'Haire kick (Drive: 5 plays, 73 yards, 2:18; Maryland 10–0)
- (3:14) MD – Malik Washington 2-yard run, Sean O'Haire kick (Drive: 7 plays, 78 yards, 3:24; Maryland 17–0)

Second Quarter

- (12:24) MD – Shaleak Knotts 32-yard pass from Malik Washington, Sean O'Haire kick (Drive: 6 plays, 73 yards, 2:25; Maryland 24–0)
- (10:45) MD – Nolan Ray 5-yard run, Sean O'Haire kick (Drive: 4 plays, 25 yards, 1:39; Maryland 31–0)
- (0:00) MD – Sean O'Haire 39-yard field goal (Drive: 14 plays, 67 yards, 6:28; Maryland 34–0)

Third Quarter

- (11:51) MD – La'khi Roland 100-yard interception, Sean O'Haire kick (Maryland 41–0)
- (5:42) TOW – Lukkas Londono 19-yard pass from Andrew Indorf, Caden Williams kick (Drive: 3 plays, 75 yards, 1:06; Maryland 41–7)

Fourth Quarter

- (11:27) MD – Sean O'Haire 28-yard field goal (Drive: 4 plays, 5 yards, 1:25; Maryland 44–7)
- (11:11) TOW – Jaceon Doss 84-yard pass from Nathan Kent, Caden Williams kick (Drive: 1 play, 84 yards, 0:12; Maryland 44–14)
- (6:13) TOW – Caden Williams 29-yard field goal (Drive: 6 plays, 50 yards, 2:47; Maryland 44–17)

| Statistics | TOW | MD |
|---|---|---|
| First downs | 14 | 21 |
| Plays–yards | 55–281 | 71–428 |
| Rushes–yards | 26–51 | 42–152 |
| Passing yards | 230 | 276 |
| Passing: comp–att–int | 14–29–1 | 21–29–1 |
| Turnovers | 2 | 1 |
| Time of possession | 23:54 | 36:06 |

| Team | Category | Player | Statistics |
|---|---|---|---|
| Towson | Passing | Andrew Indorf | 12/25, 145 yards, TD, INT |
| Towson | Rushing | Kemarrion Battles | 7 carries, 17 yards |
| Towson | Receiving | Jaceon Doss | 1 reception, 84 yards, TD |
| Maryland | Passing | Malik Washington | 16/22, 261 yards, TD, INT |
| Maryland | Rushing | Iverson Howard | 15 carries, 60 yards |
| Maryland | Receiving | Octavian Smith Jr. | 4 receptions, 103 yards |

=== Youngstown State ===
Youngstown State Penguins (2-1) vs. Towson Tigers (2-1) – Game summary

| Quarter | 1 | 2 | 3 | 4 | Total |
|---|---|---|---|---|---|
| Penguins | 7 | 0 | 10 | 14 | 31 |
| Tigers | 0 | 14 | 7 | 7 | 28 |

at Johnny Unitas Stadium • Towson, MD

- Date: September 20
- Game time: 6:00 PM EDT
- Game weather: Sunny
- Game attendance: 6,042
- Referee: Eric Lewis
- TV announcers (FloFootball): Spiro Morekas (play-by-play) and Gordy Combs (analyst)

Game information

First Quarter

- (4:21) YSU – Beau Brungard 1-yard run, Andrew Lastovka kick (Drive: 11 plays, 80 yards, 5:32; YSU 7–0)

Second Quarter

- (14:10) TOW – Al Wooten II 2-yard run, Caden Williams kick (Drive: 4 plays, 69 yards, 2:04; Tied 7–7)
- (8:03) TOW – Kemarrion Battles 33-yard pass from John Dunmore, Caden Williams kick (DriveL 8 plays, 64 yards, 4:49; TOW 14–7)

Third Quarter

- (12:11) YSU – Alex McDonald 2-yard pass from Beau Brungard, Andrew Lastovka kick (Drive: 6 plays, 23 yards, 2:40; Tied 14–14)
- (6:02) TOW – John Dunmore 19-yard pass from Andrew Indorf, Caden Williams kick (Drive: 12 plays, 75 yards, 6:09; TOW 21–14)
- (0:08) YSU – Andrew Lastovka 27-yard field goal (Drive: 11 plays, 62 yards, 5:47; TOW 21–17)

Fourth Quarter

- (12:09) TOW – Al Wooten II 1-yard run, Caden Williams kick (Drive: 7 plays, 81 yards, 2:54; TOW 28–17)
- (6:21) YSU – Beau Brungard 2-yard run, Beau Brungard pass to Max Tomczak for two-point conversion (Drive: 12 plays, 75 yards, 5:48; TOW 28–25)
- (1:37) YSU – Andrew Lastovka 48-yard field goal (Drive: 9 plays, 41 yards, 3:16; Tied 28–28)
- (0:00) YSU – Andrew Lastovka 42-yard field goal (Drive: 9 plays, 40 yards, 0:37; YSU 31–28)

| Statistics | YSU | TOW |
|---|---|---|
| First downs | 23 | 19 |
| Total yards | 426 | 378 |
| Rushing yards | 149 | 93 |
| Passing yards | 277 | 285 |
| Passing: Comp–Att–Int | 24–41–0 | 20–31–1 |
| Time of possession | 32:51 | 27:09 |

| Team | Category | Player | Statistics |
|---|---|---|---|
| Youngstown State | Passing | Beau Brungard | 24/41, 277 yards, TD |
| Youngstown State | Rushing | Beau Brungard | 18 carries, 100 yards, 2 TD |
| Youngstown State | Receiving | Max Tomczak | 7 receptions, 116 yards |
| Towson | Passing | Andrew Indorf | 18/29, 238 yards, TD, INT |
| Towson | Rushing | Al Wooten II | 12 carries, 48 yards, 2 TD |
| Towson | Receiving | Jaceon Doss | 3 receptions, 120 yards |

=== at Bryant ===
Towson Tigers (2-2) vs. Bryant Bulldogs (2-2) – Game summary

| Quarter | 1 | 2 | 3 | 4 | Total |
|---|---|---|---|---|---|
| Tigers | 3 | 10 | 10 | 3 | 26 |
| Bulldogs | 3 | 6 | 0 | 15 | 24 |

at Beirne Stadium • Smithfield, RI

- Date: September 27
- Game time: 1:00 PM EDT
- Game weather: Sunny
- Game attendance: 1,200
- Referee: Jeremy DeAngulo
- TV announcers (FloFootball): Jake Zimmer (play-by-play) and Tim Lynch (analyst)

Game information

First Quarter

- (10:22) TOW – Caden Williams 45-yard field goal (Drive: 9 plays, 29 yards, 3:21; Towson 3–0)
- (2:21) BRY – Bryce Soli 21-yard field goal (Drive: 16 plays, 46 yards, 7:58; Tied 3–3)

Second Quarter

- (14:09) TOW – Caden Williams 36-yard field goal (Drive: 10 plays, 30 yards, 3:04; Towson 6–3)
- (1:43) TOW – Al Wooten II 1-yard run, Caden Williams kick (Drive: 7 plays, 40 yards, 1:55; Towson 13–3)
- (0:48) BRY – Elijah Elliott 22-yard pass from Brennan Myer (Drive: 7 plays, 70 yards, 0:51; Towson 13–9)

Third Quarter

- (11:01) TOW – Jaceon Doss 25-yard pass from Andrew Indorf, Caden Williams kick (Drive: 9 plays, 75 yards, 3:59; Towson 20–9)
- (3:34) TOW – Caden Williams 28-yard field goal (Drive: 9 plays, 44 yards, 4:14; Towson 23–9)

Fourth Quarter

- (14:52) BRY – Elijah Elliott 12-yard run, Bryce Soli kick (Drive: 7 plays, 55 yards, 3:37; Towson 23–16)
- (8:22) BRY – Lonnie Rice 0-yard safety (Towson 23–18)
- (2:37) TOW – Caden Williams 21-yard field goal (Drive: 8 plays, 32 yards, 5:03; Towson 26–18)
- (0:23) BRY – Elijah Elliott 3-yard run (Drive: 12 plays, 67 yards, 2:10; Towson 26–24)

| Statistics | TOW | BRY |
|---|---|---|
| First downs | 18 | 21 |
| Total yards | 308 | 347 |
| Rushing yards | 155 | 129 |
| Passing yards | 153 | 218 |
| Passing: Comp–Att–Int | 17–31–0 | 22–36–1 |
| Time of possession | 33:21 | 26:39 |

| Team | Category | Player | Statistics |
|---|---|---|---|
| Towson | Passing | Andrew Indorf | 17/31, 153 yards, TD |
| Towson | Rushing | Al Wooten II | 26 carries, 104 yards, TD |
| Towson | Receiving | Jaceon Doss | 3 receptions, 41 yards, TD |
| Bryant | Passing | Brennan Myer | 22/36, 218 yards, TD, INT |
| Bryant | Rushing | Elijah Elliott | 19 carries, 100 yards, 2 TD |
| Bryant | Receiving | Aldrich Doe | 5 receptions, 57 yards |

=== Elon ===
Elon Phoenix (3-2) vs. Towson Tigers (3-2) – Game summary

| Quarter | 1 | 2 | 3 | 4 | Total |
|---|---|---|---|---|---|
| Phoenix | 3 | 7 | 0 | 7 | 17 |
| Tigers | 0 | 0 | 0 | 3 | 3 |

at Johnny Unitas Stadium • Towson, MD

- Date: October 4
- Game time: 4:00 PM EDT

| Statistics | ELON | TOW |
|---|---|---|
| First downs | | |
| Total yards | | |
| Rushing yards | | |
| Passing yards | | |
| Passing: Comp–Att–Int | | |
| Time of possession | | |

| Team | Category | Player | Statistics |
|---|---|---|---|
| Elon | Passing | | |
| Elon | Rushing | | |
| Elon | Receiving | | |
| Towson | Passing | | |
| Towson | Rushing | | |
| Towson | Receiving | | |

=== No. 12 Monmouth ===
No. 12 Monmouth Hawks (4-1) vs. Towson Tigers (3-3) – Game summary

| Quarter | 1 | 2 | 3 | 4 | Total |
|---|---|---|---|---|---|
| No. 12 Hawks | 7 | 14 | 7 | 14 | 42 |
| Tigers | 0 | 14 | 7 | 10 | 31 |

at Johnny Unitas Stadium • Towson, MD

- Date: October 11
- Game time: 2:00 PM EDT
- Game weather: Cloudy • Temperature: 57 °F (14 °C)
- Game attendance: 5,487
- Referee: Todd Bowman
- TV announcers (FloFootball): Spiro Morekas (play-by-play) and Gordy Combs (analyst)

Game information

First Quarter

- (8:16) MONM – Rodney Nelson 1-yard run, Hudson Fiene kick (Drive: 15 plays, 75 yards, 6:44; Monmouth 7-0)

Second Quarter

- (14:56) MONM – Maxwell James 4-yard pass from Derek Robertson, Hudson Fiene kick (Drive: 12 plays, 65 yards, 5:24; Monmouth 14-0)
- (11:33) TOW – CJ Schaeffer 1-yard pass from Winston Watkins, Caden Williams kick (Drive: 9 plays, 75 yards, 3:23; Monmouth 14-7)
- (5:56) MONM – Elijah Jennings 1-yard run, Hudson Fiene kick (Drive: 4 plays, 37 yards, 1:31; Monmouth 21-7)
- (0:30) TOW – John Dunmore 4-yard pass from Andrew Indorf, Caden Williams kick (Drive: 14 plays, 68 yards, 5:19; Monmouth 21-14)

Third Quarter

- (12:52) TOW – Lukkas Londono 6-yard pass from Andrew Indorf, Caden Williams kick (Drive: 4 plays, 75 yards, 2:08; 21-21)
- (3:37) MONM – Elijah Jennings 1-yard run, Hudson Fiene kick (Drive: 10 plays, 80 yards, 4:19; Monmouth 28-21)

Fourth Quarter

- (14:57) TOW – Winston Watkins 8-yard run, Caden Williams kick (Drive: 10 plays, 75 yards, 3:40; 28-28)
- (9:15) MONM – Jack Neri 10-yard pass from Derek Robertson, Hudson Fiene kick (Drive: 12 plays, 75 yards, 5:42; Monmouth 35-28)
- (4:53) TOW – Caden Williams 30-yard field goal (Drive: 9 plays, 63 yards, 4:22; Monmouth 35-31)
- (2:06) MONM – Elijah Jennings 3-yard run, Hudson Fiene kick (Drive: 7 plays, 73 yards, 2:42; Monmouth 42-31)

| Statistics | MONM | TOW |
|---|---|---|
| First downs | 29 | 23 |
| Total yards | 448 | 418 |
| Rushing yards | 204 | 125 |
| Passing yards | 244 | 293 |
| Passing: Comp–Att–Int | 26–31–0 | 22–29–0 |
| Time of possession | 31:25 | 28:35 |

| Team | Category | Player | Statistics |
|---|---|---|---|
| Monmouth | Passing | Derek Robertson | 26/31, 244 yards, 2 TD |
| Monmouth | Rushing | Rodney Nelson | 27 carries, 152 yards, TD |
| Monmouth | Receiving | Josh Derry | 6 receptions, 67 yards |
| Towson | Passing | Andrew Indorf | 21/28, 292 yards, 2 TD |
| Towson | Rushing | Al Wooten II | 15 carries, 41 yards |
| Towson | Receiving | Jaceon Doss | 7 receptions, 139 yards |

=== at Stony Brook ===
Towson Tigers (3-4) vs. Stony Brook Seawolves (3-4) – Game summary

| Quarter | 1 | 2 | 3 | 4 | Total |
|---|---|---|---|---|---|
| Tigers | - | - | - | - | 0 |
| Seawolves | - | - | - | - | 0 |

at Kenneth P. LaValle Stadium • Stony Brook, NY

- Date: October 25
- Game time: 3:30 PM EDT

| Statistics | TOW | STBK |
|---|---|---|
| First downs | | |
| Total yards | | |
| Rushing yards | | |
| Passing yards | | |
| Passing: Comp–Att–Int | | |
| Time of possession | | |

| Team | Category | Player | Statistics |
|---|---|---|---|
| Towson | Passing | | |
| Towson | Rushing | | |
| Towson | Receiving | | |
| Stony Brook | Passing | | |
| Stony Brook | Rushing | | |
| Stony Brook | Receiving | | |

=== at North Carolina A&T ===
Towson Tigers (3-5) vs. North Carolina A&T Aggies (2-6) – Game summary

| Quarter | 1 | 2 | 3 | 4 | Total |
|---|---|---|---|---|---|
| Tigers | - | - | - | - | 0 |
| Aggies | - | - | - | - | 0 |

at Truist Stadium • Greensboro, NC

- Date: November 1
- Game time: 12:00 PM EDT

| Statistics | TOW | NCAT |
|---|---|---|
| First downs | | |
| Total yards | | |
| Rushing yards | | |
| Passing yards | | |
| Passing: Comp–Att–Int | | |
| Time of possession | | |

| Team | Category | Player | Statistics |
|---|---|---|---|
| Towson | Passing | | |
| Towson | Rushing | | |
| Towson | Receiving | | |
| North Carolina A&T | Passing | | |
| North Carolina A&T | Rushing | | |
| North Carolina A&T | Receiving | | |

=== No. 10 Villanova ===
No. 10 Villanova Wildcats (6–2) at Towson Tigers (4–5) – Game summary

| Quarter | 1 | 2 | 3 | 4 | Total |
|---|---|---|---|---|---|
| No. 10 Wildcats | 0 | 7 | 7 | 14 | 28 |
| Tigers | 7 | 0 | 3 | 0 | 10 |

at Johnny Unitas Stadium • Towson, MD

- Date: November 8
- Game time: 1:00 PM EST
- Game weather: Sunny • Temperature: 64 °F (18 °C)
- Game attendance: 5,667
- Referee: Cory Hanson
- TV: FloSports

Game information

First quarter

- (1:42) TOW – John Dumore 45-yard run, Caden Williams kick (Drive: 2 plays, 73 yards, 0:40; Towson 7-0)

Second quarter

- (1:14) VILL – Ja'briel Mace 8-yard run, Jack Barnum kick (Drive: 7 plays, 80 yards, 3:01; 7-7)

Third quarter

- (13:27) VILL – Ja'briel Mace 39-yard run, Jack Barnum kick (Drive: 4 plays, 52 yards, 1:30; Villanova 14-7)
- (0:53) TOW – Caden Williams 34-yard field goal (Drive: 7 plays, 56 yards, 4:05; Villanova 14-10)

Fourth quarter

- (4:08) VILL – Ja'briel Mace 82-yard run, Jack Barnum kick (Drive: 1 play, 82 yards, 0:12; Villanova 21-10)
- (1:48) VILL – Ja'briel Mace 22-yard run, Jack Barnum kick (Drive: 5 plays, 42 yards, 0:56; Villanova 28-10)

| Statistics | VILL | TOW |
|---|---|---|
| First downs | 24 | 15 |
| Plays–yards | 71–473 | 59–287 |
| Rushes–yards | 48–353 | 29–131 |
| Passing yards | 120 | 156 |
| Passing: Comp–Att–Int | 11-23-0 | 14-30-0 |
| Turnovers | 0 | 1 |
| Time of possession | 35:31 | 24:29 |

| Team | Category | Player | Statistics |
|---|---|---|---|
| Villanova | Passing | Pat McQuaide | 11/23, 120 yards |
| Villanova | Rushing | Ja'briel Mace | 28 carries, 291 yards, 4 TD |
| Villanova | Receiving | Braden Reed | 3 receptions, 41 yards |
| Towson | Passing | Andrew Indorf | 14/30, 156 yards |
| Towson | Rushing | John Dunmore | 1 carry, 45 yards, TD |
| Towson | Receiving | John Dunmore | 4 receptions, 38 yards |

=== at Albany ===
Towson Tigers (0-0) vs. Albany Great Danes (0-0) – Game summary

| Quarter | 1 | 2 | 3 | 4 | Total |
|---|---|---|---|---|---|
| Tigers | - | - | - | - | 0 |
| Great Danes | - | - | - | - | 0 |

at Tom & Mary Casey Stadium • Albany, NY

- Date: November 15
- Game time: 12:00 PM EST

| Statistics | TOW | ALB |
|---|---|---|
| First downs | | |
| Total yards | | |
| Rushing yards | | |
| Passing yards | | |
| Passing: Comp–Att–Int | | |
| Time of possession | | |

| Team | Category | Player | Statistics |
|---|---|---|---|
| Towson | Passing | | |
| Towson | Rushing | | |
| Towson | Receiving | | |
| Albany | Passing | | |
| Albany | Rushing | | |
| Albany | Receiving | | |

=== Campbell ===
Campbell Fighting Camels (0-0) vs. Towson Tigers (0-0) – Game summary

| Quarter | 1 | 2 | 3 | 4 | Total |
|---|---|---|---|---|---|
| Fighting Camels | - | - | - | - | 0 |
| Tigers | - | - | - | - | 0 |

at Johnny Unitas Stadium • Towson, MD

- Date: November 22
- Game time: 1:00 PM EST

| Statistics | CAM | TOW |
|---|---|---|
| First downs | | |
| Total yards | | |
| Rushing yards | | |
| Passing yards | | |
| Passing: Comp–Att–Int | | |
| Time of possession | | |

| Team | Category | Player | Statistics |
|---|---|---|---|
| Campbell | Passing | | |
| Campbell | Rushing | | |
| Campbell | Receiving | | |
| Towson | Passing | | |
| Towson | Rushing | | |
| Towson | Receiving | | |
