= Pete Shinnick =

American football player and coach (born 1965)

Current position
- Title: Head coach
- Team: Towson
- Conference: CAA
- Record: 18–18

Biographical details
- Born: May 15, 1965 (age 61)

Playing career
- 1983–1986: Colorado
- Position: Guard

Coaching career (HC unless noted)
- 1988: Richmond (OL)
- 1989: Arkansas (GA/DL)
- 1990–1991: Clemson (GA/TE)
- 1992–1993: Oregon State (RC)
- 1994: Northern Michigan (OL)
- 1995–1997: St. Cloud State (OC)
- 1998: Humboldt State (OL)
- 1999–2005: Azusa Pacific
- 2005–2013: UNC Pembroke
- 2014–2022: West Florida
- 2023–present: Towson

Head coaching record
- Overall: 177–85
- Tournaments: 12–6 (NAIA playoffs); 9–4 (NCAA D-II playoffs)

Accomplishments and honors

Championships
- 1 NCAA Division II (2019); 2 GSC (2021–2022)

Awards
- AFCA Division II Coach of the Year (2017); AFCA Regional Coach of the Year (2017); 2× Don Hansen National Division II Co-Coach of the Year (2017, 2019)

Pete Shinnick (born May 15, 1965) is an American college football coach and former player. He is the head football coach at the Towson University in Towson, Maryland, competing in the NCAA Division I Football Championship Subdivision (FCS).

Shinnick came to Towson after extraordinary success with two start-up programs in Division II, first at UNC Pembroke (2007–2013), then at West Florida (2016–2022). After taking UNC Pembroke to the playoffs in the program’s third season, he then led West Florida to the playoffs in their second season, before coaching them to a national championship in just their fourth season. Shinnick was named 2017 AFCA Region 2 Coach of the Year and 2017 AFCA Division II Coach of the Year.

Shinnick previously served as the head football at Azusa Pacific University from 1999 to 2005.

== Coaching career ==
=== Azusa Pacific ===
Shinnick was the eighth head football coach at Azusa Pacific University in Azusa, California and he held that position for seven seasons, from 1999 until 2005, compiling a record of 53–22. He led the Cougars to the NAIA playoffs five times, including two national semifinal appearances.

=== UNC Pembroke ===
Shinnick was hired as UNC Pembroke's head coach on December 13, 2005, tasked with restarting a program that had been discontinued in the 1950s. Over seven seasons at Pembroke, Shinnick compiled an overall record of 50–24 and led the Braves to two postseason appearances.

=== West Florida ===
On January 31, 2014, the University of West Florida announced it had hired Shinnick as the head coach of its newly established football team, which began play in 2016. On November 12, 2017, the Argos had made the playoffs in only the second season, making them the fastest team in NCAA history to do so. They also went to the NCAA D-II National Championship game the same year, breaking another record. On December 21, 2019, Shinnick won the NCAA D-II National Championship with the UWF Argos in just the program's 4th year of existence.

=== Towson ===
On December 11, 2022, Shinnick was hired as head football coach at Towson University.

== Personal life ==
Shinnick has four children. His father, Don Shinnick, played linebacker for the Baltimore Colts for 13 seasons.

== Head coaching record ==
Year	Team	Overall	Conference	Standing	Bowl/playoffs	NAIA/AFCA^{#}
Azusa Pacific Cougars (NAIA independent) (1999–2005)
1999	Azusa Pacific	9–3			L NAIA Semifinal	7
2000	Azusa Pacific	6–4			L NAIA First Round	16
2001	Azusa Pacific	4–5				
2002	Azusa Pacific	9–1				16
2003	Azusa Pacific	8–2			L NAIA First Round	13
2004	Azusa Pacific	11–3			L NAIA Semifinal	4
2005	Azusa Pacific	6–4			L NAIA First Round	12
Azusa Pacific:		53–22				
UNC Pembroke (NCAA Division II independent) (2007–2013)
2007	UNC Pembroke	4–7				
2008	UNC Pembroke	9–1				
2009	UNC Pembroke	9–2			L NCAA Division II First Round	20
2010	UNC Pembroke	5–5				
2011	UNC Pembroke	8–3				
2012	UNC Pembroke	6–4				
2013	UNC Pembroke	9–2			L NCAA Division II Second Round	15
UNC Pembroke:		50–24				
West Florida Argonauts (Gulf South Conference) (2016–2022)
2016	West Florida	5–6	3–5	6th		
2017	West Florida	11–4	5–3	4th	L NCAA Division II Championship	2
2018	West Florida	6–5	4–4	5th		
2019	West Florida	13–2	7–1	2nd	W NCAA Division II Championship	1
2020–21	No team—COVID-19					
2021	West Florida	9–2	6–1	T–1st	L NCAA Division II First Round	12
2022	West Florida	12–2	6–1	T–1st	L NCAA Division II Semifinal	4
West Florida:		56–21	31–15			
Towson Tigers (Coastal Athletic Association Football Conference) (2023–present)
2023	Towson	5–6	4–4	T–6th		
2024	Towson	7–5	5–3	T–6th		
2025	Towson	6–6	4–4	T–7th		
2026	Towson	0–1	0–1			
Towson:		18–18	13–12			
Total:		177–85				
National championship Conference title Conference division title or championship game berth
