= Austin Reed (American football) =

American football player (born 2000)

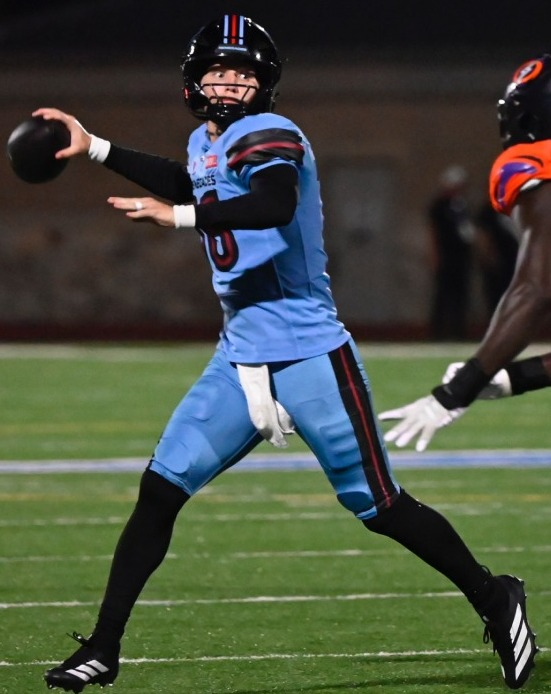
- Reed with the Dallas Renegades in 2026

Profile
- Position: Quarterback

Personal information
- Born: February 22, 2000 (age 26); St. Augustine, Florida, U.S.
- Listed height: 6 ft 1 in (1.85 m)
- Listed weight: 221 lb (100 kg)

Career information
- High school: St. Augustine (FL)
- College: Southern Illinois (2018); West Florida (2019–2021); Western Kentucky (2022–2023)
- NFL draft: 2024: undrafted

Career history
- Chicago Bears (2024–2025)*; Dallas Renegades (2026); Baltimore Ravens (2026)
- * Offseason or practice squad member only

Awards and highlights
- UFL passing touchdown leader (2026); NCAA Division II champion (2019); NCAA passing yards leader (2022); C-USA Newcomer of the Year (2022); Second-team All-C-USA (2022)
- Stats at Pro Football Reference

Austin Reed (born February 22, 2000) is an American professional football quarterback. He played college football for the Southern Illinois Salukis, West Florida Argonauts, and Western Kentucky Hilltoppers before signing with the Chicago Bears as an undrafted free agent in 2024.

== Early life ==
Austin Reed grew up in St. Augustine Beach, Florida, and attended St. Augustine High School.

== College career ==
=== Southern Illinois ===
Reed began his college football career at Southern Illinois.

=== West Florida ===
Reed transferred to West Florida in the Summer of 2019. He led the 2019 West Florida Argonauts football team to the NCAA Division II national championship. During the national championship season he totaled 4,084 passing yards with 40 touchdowns and 11 interceptions.

In July 2021, Reed signed the first Name, Image and Likeness (NIL) sponsorship in West Florida history, striking a deal with the Running Wild chain of running stores.

=== Western Kentucky ===
After the 2021 season, he entered the NCAA transfer portal and committed in March 2022 to Western Kentucky. He was selected as the team's starting quarterback during summer camp in August 2022.

In his first game at Western Kentucky, he threw four touchdown passes in a 38–28 victory over Austin Peay. Reed passed for more yards in the 2022 season than any other college football quarterback with 4,744 passing yards on the season.

On January 6, 2024, Reed announced that he would enter the 2024 NFL draft.

== Professional career ==
Pre-draft measurables
Height	Weight	Arm length	Hand span	Wingspan	40-yard dash	10-yard split	20-yard split
6 ft 1 1/2 in (1.87 m)	220 lb (100 kg)	30 1/8 in (0.77 m)	9 7/8 in (0.25 m)	6 ft 1 3/8 in (1.86 m)	4.82 s	1.67 s	2.81 s
All values from NFL Combine

=== Chicago Bears ===
Reed signed as an undrafted free agent with the Chicago Bears after going undrafted in the 2024 NFL draft. He completed 12 of 16 passes for 123 yards and one touchdown during the preseason, finishing with a passer rating of 117.4. Reed was waived by the Bears on August 27, 2024, then signed to the practice squad the next day.

Reed signed a reserve/future contract with Chicago on January 6, 2025. On August 25, Reed was waived by the Bears.

=== Dallas Renegades ===
On January 12, 2026, Reed signed with the Dallas Renegades of the United Football League (UFL). On March 25, Reed was named the starter for Week 1 over Luis Perez, who had started the past 25 games dating back to the 2023 season. In his first start, Reed completed 26 of 40 passes for 376 yards and three touchdowns in a 36–17 win over the Houston Gamblers. His 376 passing yards set a new UFL single-game record, surpassing the previous mark of 368 yards set by Adrian Martinez during the 2024 season. Reed ended up starting all ten games for the Renegades; despite going just 4–6 and missing the playoffs, he set a new league record with 21 touchdown passes and finished second to Jack Plummer in passing yards.

Renegades coach Rick Neuheisel, who was transferred to an expansion Colorado team in September 2026 and with it retained rights to all of the Renegades' players as part of that transfer, expressed interest in bringing Reed to Colorado if Reed was interested in doing so.

=== Baltimore Ravens ===
On August 12, 2026, Reed signed with the Baltimore Ravens. On August 29, he was waived by the Ravens as a part of preliminary roster cuts. He was re-signed to the practice squad on November 2. On November 5, Reed was signed to the 53-man roster and waived the next day. On November 7 he was waived by the Ravens after they traded for Jacoby Brissett to make space on the 53-man roster.

== Personal life ==
Reed is a Christian. He is married to his wife Peyton. They have two daughters.

== Career statistics ==
=== UFL ===
Legend
	UFL record
	Led the league
**Bold**	Career high

Season	Team	Games			Passing								Rushing			
Season	Team	GP	GS	Record	Cmp	Att	Pct	Yds	Y/A	TD	Int	Rtg	Att	Yds	Avg	TD
2026	DAL	10	10	4–6	174	309	56.3	1,923	6.2	21	9	85.5	30	108	3.6	0
Career		10	10	4–6	174	309	56.3	1,923	6.2	21	9	85.5	30	108	3.6	0

=== College ===
Legend
	D-II champion
	Led the NCAA
**Bold**	Career high

Season	Team	Games			Passing								Rushing			
Season	Team	GP	GS	Record	Cmp	Att	Pct	Yds	Y/A	TD	Int	Rtg	Att	Yds	Avg	TD
2018	Southern Illinois	Redshirted (redshirt)														
2019	West Florida	**15**	14	**13–1**	279	491	56.8	4,089	8.3	**40**	11	149.2	72	149	2.1	6
2020	West Florida	Season canceled due to the COVID-19 pandemic														
2021	West Florida	11	11	9–2	205	378	54.2	3,375	**8.9**	38	**9**	**157.6**	28	172	**6.1**	3
2022	Western Kentucky	14	14	9–5	**389**	**602**	**64.6**	**4,744**	7.9	**40**	11	149.1	**91**	**224**	2.5	**8**
2023	Western Kentucky	12	12	7–5	289	470	61.5	3,324	7.1	31	11	138.0	42	100	2.4	4
Career		52	51	38–13	1,162	1,941	59.8	15,548	8.0	149	42	148.2	233	645	2.8	21
