= West Florida Argonauts =

College sports program in Florida

- University: University of West Florida
- Nickname: Argos/Argonauts
- NCAA: Division I (FCS)
- Conference: ASUN (primary); UAC (football)
- President: Manny Diaz Jr.
- Athletic director: Dave Scott
- Location: Pensacola, Florida
- First season: 1974; 52 years ago
- Varsity teams: 15 (7 men's, 8 women's)
- Football stadium: Pen Air Field At Darrell Gooden Stadium
- Basketball arena: UWF Field House
- Baseball stadium: Jim Spooner Field
- Softball stadium: UWF Softball Complex
- Soccer stadium: UWF Soccer Complex
- Aquatics center: UWF Aquatic Center
- Tennis venue: Ralph "Skeeter" Carson Tennis Complex
- Colors: Royal blue and Kelly green
- Mascot: Argie the Argonaut
- Website: goargos.com

Team NCAA championships
- 10

Individual and relay NCAA champions
- 18

The West Florida Argonauts (also known as the Argos) are the athletic teams that represent the University of West Florida, located in Pensacola, Florida. The Argonauts compete in NCAA Division I as members of the Atlantic Sun Conference (ASUN) in most sports and the United Athletic Conference (UAC) in football (FCS).

The university sponsors 15 varsity sports. Men's sports include baseball, basketball, cross country, football, golf, soccer, and tennis. Women's sports include basketball, cross country, golf, soccer, softball, swimming and diving, tennis, and volleyball.

== History ==
The Argonauts previously competed at the NCAA Division II level as members of the Gulf South Conference (GSC) from the 1994–95 academic year through the 2025–26 academic year. Prior to joining the NCAA, the program competed in the Southern States Conference of the National Association of Intercollegiate Athletics (NAIA) from 1974–75 to 1993–94, with a brief hiatus from 1976–77 to 1979–80 when the athletics program was dropped.

On April 2, 2026, the University of West Florida announced it would reclassify to NCAA Division I, joining the Atlantic Sun Conference for all sports except football, which joined the United Athletic Conference. The move became effective on July 1, 2026.

== Varsity sports ==
Men's sports	Women's sports
Baseball	Basketball
Basketball	Cross Country
Cross Country	Golf
Football	Soccer
Golf	Softball
Soccer	Swimming & Diving
Tennis	Tennis
	Volleyball

=== Baseball ===
West Florida has had 24 Major League Baseball draft selections since the draft began in 1965.

Year	Player	Round	Team
1982	Thomas Czuk	24	Athletics
1987	Randall Ward	36	Braves
1989	Mark Ettles	33	Tigers
1991	Patrick Underhill	50	Rangers
1992	Jason Smith	37	Red Sox
1993	Chris Schmitt	21	Brewers
1994	Greg Beck	34	Brewers
1997	Ron Ricks	57	Angels
2003	Jeremy Noegel	34	Blue Jays
2004	Pat Cottrell	33	Devil Rays
2009	John Church	23	Mets
2010	Kevin Johnson	20	Angels
2011	Greg Pron	42	Mets
2011	Brandon Brewer	36	Angels
2011	Ben Hawkins	36	Nationals
2011	Daniel Vargas-Vila	28	Angels
2011	Dustin Lawley	19	Mets
2012	Brian Ellington	16	Marlins
2014	Jordan DeLorenzo	12	Cardinals
2014	Dawson Brown	24	Athletics
2014	Cliff Covington	30	Giants
2015	Ledarious Clark	12	Rangers
2024	Darrien McDowell	6	Padres
2025	Dalton Neuschwander	10	Orioles

=== Football ===
West Florida made the decision to add a football program in 2013. The Argonauts signed their first recruiting class in February 2015 and the fall of 2015 featured practice and intrasquad scrimmages. The first year of varsity competition was the 2016 season. The Argos’ first home game was on September 10, 2016, at Blue Wahoos Stadium against Missouri S&T. In 2017, the Argonauts advanced to the national championship game, where they lost to Texas A&M–Commerce 37–27. In 2019, West Florida won their first national title when they defeated Minnesota State 48–40.

==== Program achievements ====
Title	Years won
Gulf South Conference Champions	2021, 2022, 2025
NCAA Division II Team Playoff Participants	2017, 2019, 2021, 2022, 2023, 2025
NCAA Division II Regional Championships	2017, 2019, 2022
NCAA Division II National Championships	2019

== Achievements ==
=== NCAA Division II Team National Championships (10) ===
- Baseball: 2011
- Football: 2019
- Men's Golf: 2001, 2008, 2025
- Men's Tennis: 2004, 2005, 2014, 2017
- Women's Soccer: 2012

=== NAIA Team National Championships (1) ===
- Softball: 1993

=== Gulf South Conference All Sports Trophies (30) ===
- Men's: 8 (97-98, 02–03, 06–07, 11–12, 12–13, 15–16, 16–17, 17–18)
- Women's: 16 (97-98, 98–99, 03–04, 05–06, 06–07, 07–08, 08–09, 09–10, 10–11, 11–12, 12–13, 13–14, 14–15, 15–16, 16–17, 18–19)
- Overall (started in 2013–14): 6 (13–14, 14–15, 15–16, 16–17, 17–18, 18–19)

=== NCAA Division II Individual National Championships (18) ===
- Men's Golf – Orjan Larsen (1998)
- Men's Golf - Chandler Blanchet (2017)
- Women's Swimming & Diving - Monica Amaral (2016 1-Meter & 3-Meter Diving)
- Women's Swimming & Diving - Theresa Michalak (2016 100-Yard Breaststroke)
- Women's Swimming & Diving - Monica Amaral (2017 1-Meter & 3-Meter Diving)
- Women's Swimming & Diving - Theresa Michalak (2017 50-Yard Freestyle, 100-Yard Freestyle, 100-Yard Breaststroke, 100 Butterfly)
- Men's Tennis – Jens Gerlach/Matt Wallhead (1996)
- Men's Tennis – Radovan Chrz (2000 – ITA Singles, ITA "Super Bowl")
- Men's Tennis – Radovan Chrz (2000 – ITA Singles)
- Men's Tennis – Bruno Savi (2013 – ITA Singles)
- Men's Tennis - Alex Peyrot/Pedro Dumont (2016 - ITA Doubles)
- Women's Tennis - Berta Bonardi (2018 - ITA Singles)
- Women's Tennis - Berta Bonardi (2019 - ITA Singles)

=== NAIA Individual National Championships: (6) ===
- Men's Cross Country – John Viitanen (1996 – Marathon)
- Men's Tennis – Eric Hochman (1990 – Singles)
- Men's Tennis – Eric Hochman/Geoffrey Watts (1991 – Doubles)
- Men's Tennis – Sorin Cherebetiu/Andrej Tonejc (1992 – Doubles)
- Women's Tennis – Bronna Allison/Laura Cadena (1988 – Doubles)
- Women's Tennis – Bronna Allison (1989 – Singles)

=== Conference Championships (115) ===
==== Gulf South Conference Championships (109) ====
- Baseball: 2 (2007, 2021)
- Football: 2 (2021, 2022)
- Men's Basketball: 1 (2018)
- Men's Cross Country: 2 (1994, 1996)
- Men's Golf: 18 (1995–98, 2001–03, 2006–08, 2011, 2013–19, 2021)
- Men's Soccer: 10 (1998, 2001, 2003, 2006–10, 2013, 2021)
- Men's Tennis: 14 (1995, 1997–99, 2002–03, 2005–06, 2012–15, 2017, 2022)
- Softball: 4 (1998, 2004–05, 2019)
- Volleyball: 11 (2008–13, 2017–19, 2021–22)
- Women's Basketball: 1 (2014)
- Women's Cross Country: 3 (1996, 2011–12)
- Women's Golf: 11 (2006–10, 2012–16, 2021)
- Women's Soccer: 11 (1996, 1998–99, 2006, 2008–10, 2012–13, 2016, 2018)
- Women's Tennis: 19 (1995–96, 1998–99, 2000–02, 2006–07, 2009, 2011–19)

==== New South Intercollegiate Swimming and Diving Conference Championships (6) ====
- Women's Swimming and Diving: 6 (2015–16, 2020–23)

=== Gulf South Conference Commissioner's Trophies (8) ===
- Krissy Styrna - Softball (2001–02)
- Kevin Warrick - Men's Golf (2002–03)
- Lindsay Nemanich - Women's Soccer (2006–07)
- Suzana Cavalcante - Women's Tennis (2007–08)
- Courtney Jones - Women's Soccer (2009–10)
- Kevin Ducros - Men's Tennis (2012–13)
- Autumn Duyn - Women's Volleyball (2015–16)
- Chandler Blanchet - Men's Golf (2017–18)

=== Gulf South Conference Hall of Fame (4) ===
- Richard Berg, Athletic Director - Class of 2014 (Inaugural Class)
- Radovan Chrz, Men's Tennis - Class of 2017
- Suzana Cavalcante, Women's Tennis - Class of 2018
- Kevin Warrick, Men's Golf - Class of 2019

== Notable athletes ==
- Mickey Gorka (born 1972), Israeli basketball player and coach
- Moochie Norris (1996), former NBA player
- Daniela Cruz - professional soccer player for the Costa Rica women's national football team
- Austin Reed, NFL quarterback
- Marcus Stokes, Memphis Tigers quarterback
