= Minnesota State Mavericks football =

Intercollegiate American football team for Minnesota State University

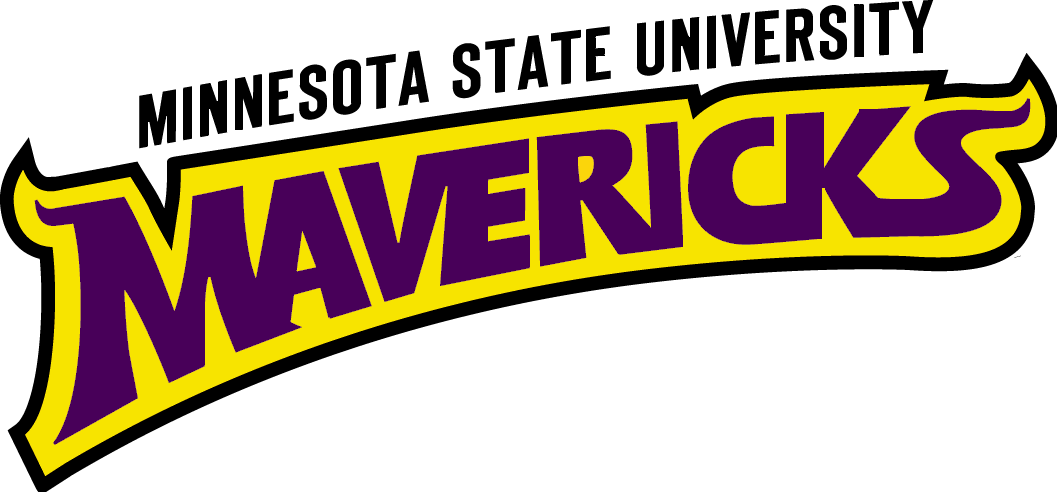
- First season: 1922; 104 years ago
- Head coach: Todd Hoffner; 13th season, 131–33 (.799)
- Location: Mankato, Minnesota
- Stadium: Blakeslee Stadium (capacity: 7,500)
- NCAA division: Division II
- Conference: Northern Sun Intercollegiate Conference (NSIC)
- Colors: Purple and gold
- All-time record: 487–394–27 (.551)
- Bowl record: 1–0–0 (1.000)

Conference championships
- 22 (most recent: 2022, NSIC)

Division championships
- 10
- Consensus All-Americans: 68
- Website: msumavericks.com

The Minnesota State Mavericks football program is the intercollegiate American football team for the Minnesota State University, Mankato located in the U.S. state of Minnesota.

The team plays in NCAA Division II and is a member of the Northern Sun Intercollegiate Conference. Since 1962, they have played in Blakeslee Stadium, with a natural grass field and a capacity of 7,000.

The current head coach is Todd Hoffner, who has led Minnesota State to NCAA playoff appearances (2008, 2009, 2014, 2015, 2017, 2018, 2019, 2022, 2023 & 2024) and two appearances at the NCAA Division II National Championship game in 2014 and 2019.

== Postseason ==
=== NCAA Division II playoffs ===
The Mavericks have made seventeen appearances in the NCAA Division II playoffs, with a combined record of 19–16.

Year	Round	Opponent	Result
1987	Quarterfinals	Portland State	L, 21–27
1991	First Round; Quarterfinals	North Dakota State; Portland State	W, 27–7; L, 27–37
1993	First Round; Quarterfinals	Missouri Southern State; North Dakota	W, 34–13; L, 21–54
2008	First Round	Ashland	L, 16–27
2009	First Round	Hillsdale	L, 24–27 ^{OT}
2012	Second Round; Quarterfinals; Semifinals	Northwest Missouri State; Missouri Western; Valdosta State	W, 38–35; W, 17–10; L, 19–35
2013	Second Round	St. Cloud State	L, 48–54
2014	Second Round; Quarterfinals; Semifinals; National Championship	Pittsburg State; Minnesota–Duluth; Concord; CSU Pueblo	W, 24–21; W, 44–17; W, 47–13; L, 0–13
2015	First Round	Emporia State	L, 49–51
2017	First Round; Second Round; Regional Finals	CSU Pueblo; Midwestern State; Texas A&M–Commerce	W, 16–13 ^{OT} W, 63–21; L, 21–31
2018	Second Round; Regional Finals; Semifinals	CSU Pueblo; Tarleton State; Ferris State	W, 24–10; W, 13–10; L, 25–42
2019	Second Round; Regional Finals; Semifinals; National Championship	CSU Pueblo; Texas A&M–Commerce; Slippery Rock; West Florida	W, 35–7; W, 42–21; W, 58–15; L, 40–48
2022	First Round; Second Round	Wayne State (NE); Colorado Mines	W, 26–9; L, 45–48
2023	First Round	Augustana (SD)	L, 24–51
2024	First Round; Second Round; Regional Finals; Semifinals	Augustana (SD); CSU Pueblo; Bemidji State; Valdosta State	W, 20–19; W, 26–23; W, 27–23; L, 21–35
2025	First Round; Regional Semifinals; Regional Finals	Findlay; Indianapolis; Ferris State	W, 37–14; W, 35–27; L, 29–52
2026	First Round	Michigan Tech	TBP

=== Bowl Game ===
The Mavericks have played in the Mineral Water Bowl one time, in 2011.

Year	Bowl	Coach	Opponent	Result	Record
2011	Mineral Water Bowl	Todd Hoffner	Northeastern State	W, 28–14	9–3

== Notable former players ==
Notable alumni who played in the NFL include:

- Larry Brown
- Bob Bruer
- Tywan Mitchell
- Chris Reed
- Adam Thielen
- Shane Zylstra

Other Notable Pro Players:

- Zach Witt former Maverick quarterback played professionally in the German Football League (GFL) for the Franken Knights 2001-2002 and won the 2003 GFL German Bowl Championship playing for the Hamburg Blue Devils.

== Facilities ==
From 1966 to 2017 the university hosted the Minnesota Vikings of the National Football League for their preseason training camp. The Vikings eventually left Mankato after a new training facility was built in Eagan, MN. Five other NFL teams used campuses across Wisconsin and Minnesota for training camp, in what was known as the Cheese League.
