= 2019 NCAA Division II football season =

American college football season

- Total No. of teams: 167
- Regular season: August 31 – November 16, 2019
- Playoffs: November 23 – December 21, 2019
- National Championship: McKinney Independent School District Stadium; McKinney, TX; December 21, 2019
- Champion: West Florida
- Harlon Hill Trophy: Roland Rivers III, QB, Slippery Rock

The 2019 NCAA Division II football season, part of college football in the United States organized by the National Collegiate Athletic Association (NCAA) at the Division II level, began on August 31 and ended on December 21 with the Division II championship at the McKinney Independent School District Stadium in McKinney, Texas, hosted by the Lone Star Conference. West Florida won the title, defeating Minnesota State, 48–40.

== D-II wins over FCS teams ==
September 7: Kentucky State 13, Robert Morris 7
September 7: East Stroudsburg 24, Wagner 14
September 7: Virginia Union 36, Hampton 17
September 7: Truman State 10, Drake 7
September 7: Midwestern State 33, Northwestern State 7
September 7: Tarleton State 37, Stephen F. Austin 26
September 21: Truman 38, Valparaiso 7
September 28: Charleston (WV) 19, Valparaiso 13
September 28: Kentucky State 33, Jackson State 25
October 12: Missouri S&T 23, Texas Southern 20

== Conference changes and new programs ==
=== Membership changes ===
School	Former conference	New conference
Franklin Pierce Ravens	New program	Northeast-10
Frostburg State Bobcats	NJAC (D-III)	Mountain East
Humboldt State Lumberjacks	GNAC	Dropped program
Lincoln Blue Tigers	GLVC	MIAA
Lindenwood Lions	MIAA	GLVC
LIU Post Pioneers	Northeast-10	Combined athletics with LIU Brooklyn; football team now competes in NEC (FCS)
Malone Pioneers	G-MAC	Dropped program
Merrimack Warriors	Northeast-10	NEC (FCS)
Savannah State Tigers	MEAC (FCS)	SIAC
Shepherd Rams	Mountain East	Pennsylvania State Athletic Conference
Virginia–Wise Cavaliers	Mountain East	South Atlantic
Wheeling Cardinals	New program	Mountain East

Davenport completed its transition to Division II and became eligible for the postseason.

== Conference standings ==
=== Super Region 1 ===
2019 Great Midwest Athletic Conference football standings
	Conf.			Overall
Team	W		L	W		L
No. 23 Tiffin $^	7	–	0	9	–	2
Ohio Dominican #	6	–	1	7	–	3
Findlay	5	–	2	7	–	4
Hillsdale	4	–	3	6	–	5
Lake Erie	2	–	5	3	–	8
Walsh	2	–	5	3	–	8
Alderson Broaddus	1	–	6	1	–	9
Kentucky Wesleyan	1	–	6	1	–	10
$ – Conference champion; ^ – NCAA Division II playoff participant; # – America's Crossroads Bowl participant; Rankings from AFCA poll

2019 Mountain East Conference football standings
	Conf.			Overall
Team	W		L	W		L
No. 10 Notre Dame (OH) $^	9	–	1	12	–	2
Charleston (WV)	7	–	3	8	–	3
Frostburg State #	7	–	3	8	–	3
Urbana	7	–	3	7	–	4
West Virginia State	7	–	3	7	–	4
Glenville State	6	–	4	7	–	4
Fairmont State	5	–	5	5	–	5
West Liberty	4	–	6	5	–	6
Concord	1	–	9	1	–	10
West Virginia Wesleyan	1	–	9	1	–	10
Wheeling	1	–	9	1	–	10
$ – Conference champion; ^ – NCAA Division II playoff participant; # – Provisional NCAA Division II member; Rankings from AFCA poll

2019 Northeast-10 Conference football standings
	Conf.			Overall
Team	W		L	W		L
New Haven +	6	–	2	7	–	3
Bentley +	6	–	2	6	–	4
Assumption	5	–	3	6	–	4
Pace	5	–	3	6	–	4
Stonehill	5	–	3	6	–	4
Saint Anselm	4	–	4	4	–	7
American International	3	–	5	4	–	6
Southern Connecticut	2	–	6	2	–	8
Franklin Pierce	0	–	8	1	–	10
+ – Conference co-champions

2019 Pennsylvania State Athletic Conference football standings
	Conf.			Overall
Team	W		L	W		L
East Division
No. 16 Kutztown xy^	7	–	0	11	–	2
No. 22 Shepherd ^	6	–	1	10	–	3
No. 24 West Chester ^	5	–	2	9	–	3
Shippensburg	4	–	3	4	–	7
Bloomsburg	3	–	4	5	–	6
East Stroudsburg	2	–	5	6	–	5
Millersville	1	–	6	2	–	9
Lock Haven	0	–	7	2	–	9
West Division
No. 6 Slippery Rock xy$^	7	–	0	13	–	1
No. 21 IUP ^	6	–	1	9	–	3
California (PA)	5	–	2	7	–	4
Mercyhurst	3	–	4	6	–	5
Edinboro	3	–	4	3	–	8
Seton Hill	2	–	5	2	–	8
Clarion	1	–	6	3	–	8
Gannon	1	–	6	2	–	9
Championship: Slippery Rock 37, Kutztown 35
$ – Conference champion; x – Division champion/co-champions; y – Championship game participant; ^ – NCAA Division II playoff participant; Rankings from AFCA poll

=== Super Region 2 ===
2019 Central Intercollegiate Athletic Association football standings
	Conf.			Overall
Team	W		L	W		L
Northern
No. 18 Bowie State xy$^	7	–	0	11	–	1
Virginia State	6	–	1	8	–	2
Virginia Union	5	–	2	7	–	3
Chowan	2	–	5	3	–	7
Elizabeth City State	2	–	5	2	–	9
Lincoln (PA)	0	–	7	0	–	10
Southern
Fayetteville State xy	6	–	1	8	–	3
Shaw	5	–	2	6	–	4
Johnson C. Smith	3	–	4	4	–	6
Winston–Salem State	3	–	4	4	–	6
St. Augustine's	2	–	5	2	–	8
Livingstone	1	–	6	4	–	6
Championship: Bowie State 23, Fayetteville State 7
$ – Conference champion; x – Division champion/co-champions; y – Championship game participant; ^ – NCAA Division II playoff participant; Rankings from AFCA Poll

2019 Gulf South Conference football standings
	Conf.			Overall
Team	W		L	W		L
No. 5 Valdosta State $^	8	–	0	10	–	1
No. 1 West Florida ^	7	–	1	13	–	2
Delta State	5	–	3	6	–	4
West Georgia	4	–	4	6	–	5
Mississippi College	4	–	4	5	–	5
West Alabama	3	–	5	6	–	5
Florida Tech	3	–	5	5	–	6
North Greenville	2	–	6	3	–	7
Shorter	0	–	8	1	–	10
$ – Conference champion; ^ – NCAA Division II playoff participant; Rankings from AFCA Poll

2019 South Atlantic Conference football standings
	Conf.			Overall
Team	W		L	W		L
No. 4 Lenoir–Rhyne $^	8	–	0	13	–	1
No. 19 Wingate ^	7	–	1	10	–	2
No. 20 Carson–Newman ^	6	–	2	9	–	3
Mars Hill	4	–	4	5	–	6
Newberry	4	–	4	5	–	6
Tusculum	4	–	4	5	–	6
Limestone	2	–	6	3	–	8
Virginia–Wise	1	–	7	2	–	9
Catawba	0	–	8	1	–	10
$ – Conference champion; ^ – NCAA Division II playoff participant; Rankings from AFCA Coaches poll

2019 Southern Intercollegiate Athletic Conference football standings
	Conf.			Overall
Team	W		L	W		L
East
Savannah State #	5	–	0	7	–	3
Albany State xy	5	–	1	7	–	4
Fort Valley State	4	–	2	6	–	4
Morehouse	2	–	4	4	–	6
Benedict	1	–	5	1	–	9
Clark Atlanta	0	–	6	0	–	10
West
Miles xy$^	5	–	1	9	–	3
Tuskegee	4	–	2	5	–	5
Kentucky State	3	–	3	7	–	3
Lane	2	–	4	4	–	6
Central State (OH)	2	–	4	3	–	7
Championship: Miles 21, Albany State 6
$ – Conference champion; x – Division champion/co-champions; y – Championship game participant; ^ – NCAA Division II playoff participant; # – Provisional NCAA Division II member

2019 NCAA Division II independents football records
	Conf.			Overall
Team	W		L	W		L
UNC Pembroke		–		4	–	7

=== Super Region 3 ===
2019 Great American Conference football standings
	Conf.			Overall
Team	W		L	W		L
No. 14 Ouachita Baptist $^	11	–	0	11	–	1
No. 15 Harding ^	10	–	1	10	–	2
Henderson State #	9	–	2	9	–	3
Southern Arkansas #	8	–	3	8	–	4
Oklahoma Baptist	7	–	4	7	–	4
Arkansas–Monticello	5	–	6	5	–	6
NW Oklahoma State	4	–	7	4	–	7
Arkansas Tech	3	–	8	3	–	8
East Central	3	–	8	3	–	8
SW Oklahoma State	3	–	8	3	–	8
Southern Nazarene	2	–	9	2	–	9
SE Oklahoma State	1	–	10	1	–	10
$ – Conference champion; ^ – NCAA Division II playoff participant; # – bowl participant (Southern Arkansas: Heritage Bowl, Henderson State: Live United Texarkana Bowl); Rankings from AFCA poll

2019 Great Lakes Intercollegiate Athletic Conference football standings
	Conf.			Overall
Team	W		L	W		L
No. 3 Ferris State $^	8	–	0	12	–	1
Wayne State (MI)	7	–	1	8	–	3
Ashland	6	–	2	7	–	4
Grand Valley State	5	–	3	8	–	3
Davenport	3	–	5	5	–	5
Michigan Tech	3	–	5	5	–	5
Saginaw Valley State	3	–	5	5	–	6
Northwood	1	–	7	1	–	10
Northern Michigan	0	–	8	1	–	9
$ – Conference champion; ^ – NCAA Division II playoff participant; Rankings from AFCA poll

2019 Great Lakes Valley Conference football standings
	Conf.			Overall
Team	W		L	W		L
No. 25 Lindenwood $^	7	–	0	9	–	4
No. 17 Indianapolis ^	6	–	1	9	–	2
Truman State #	5	–	2	10	–	2
Missouri S&T	4	–	3	7	–	4
McKendree	3	–	4	5	–	6
Quincy	2	–	5	5	–	6
Southwest Baptist	1	–	6	3	–	8
William Jewell	0	–	7	1	–	10
$ – Conference champion; ^ – NCAA Division II playoff participant; # – America's Crossroads Bowl participant; Rankings from AFCA Poll

2019 Mid-America Intercollegiate Athletics Association football standings
	Conf.			Overall
Team	W		L	W		L
No. 7 NW Missouri State +^	10	–	1	12	–	2
No. 13 Central Missouri +^	10	–	1	11	–	2
Missouri Western #	8	–	3	9	–	3
Fort Hays State	8	–	3	8	–	3
Nebraska–Kearney #	6	–	5	7	–	5
Pittsburg State	6	–	5	6	–	5
Washburn	6	–	5	6	–	5
Central Oklahoma	5	–	6	5	–	6
Emporia State	4	–	7	4	–	7
Missouri Southern	2	–	9	2	–	9
Lincoln (MO)	1	–	10	1	–	10
Northeastern State	0	–	11	0	–	11
+ – Conference co-champions; ^ – NCAA Division II playoff participant; # – bowl participant (Missouri Western: Live United Texarkana Bowl, Nebraska-Kearney: Mineral Water Bowl); Rankings from AFCA poll

=== Super Region 4 ===
2019 Great Northwest Athletic Conference football standings
	Conf.			Overall
Team	W		L	W		L
Central Washington +	5	–	1	7	–	4
Western Oregon +	5	–	1	7	–	4
Azusa Pacific	1	–	5	1	–	9
Simon Fraser	1	–	5	1	–	9
+ – Conference co-champions

2019 Lone Star Conference football standings
	Conf.			Overall
Team	W		L	W		L
No. 9 Tarleton State $^	8	–	0	11	–	1
No. 11 Texas A&M–Commerce ^	7	–	1	10	–	3
Angelo State	5	–	3	8	–	3
West Texas A&M	5	–	3	8	–	3
Eastern New Mexico #	4	–	4	8	–	4
Midwestern State	3	–	5	5	–	6
UT Permian Basin	2	–	6	4	–	7
Texas A&M–Kingsville	1	–	7	2	–	9
Western New Mexico	1	–	7	1	–	10
$ – Conference champion; ^ – NCAA Division II playoff participant; # – Heritage Bowl participant; Rankings from AFCA Coaches poll

2019 Northern Sun Intercollegiate Conference football standings
	Conf.			Overall
Team	W		L	W		L
North
Bemidji State	8	–	3	8	–	3
Minnesota–Duluth	8	–	3	8	–	3
MSU Moorhead	6	–	5	6	–	5
Northern State	6	–	5	6	–	5
St. Cloud State	4	–	7	4	–	7
Minot State	3	–	8	3	–	8
Mary	2	–	9	2	–	9
Minnesota–Crookston	0	–	11	0	–	11
South
No. 2 Minnesota State $^	11	–	0	14	–	1
Augustana (SD) ^	9	–	2	9	–	3
Sioux Falls ^	8	–	3	8	–	4
Winona State #	8	–	3	8	–	4
Concordia–St. Paul	6	–	5	6	–	5
Wayne State (NE)	4	–	7	4	–	7
SW Minnesota State	3	–	8	3	–	8
Upper Iowa	2	–	9	2	–	9
$ – Conference champion; ^ – NCAA Division II playoff participant; # – Mineral Water Bowl participant; Rankings from AFCA Poll

2019 Rocky Mountain Athletic Conference football standings
	Conf.			Overall
Team	W		L	W		L
No. 8 Colorado Mines $^	10	–	0	12	–	1
No. 12 CSU Pueblo ^	9	–	1	11	–	2
Dixie State	7	–	3	8	–	3
Colorado Mesa	6	–	4	6	–	5
Chadron State	5	–	5	6	–	5
Western Colorado	5	–	5	5	–	6
Adams State	4	–	6	4	–	7
Fort Lewis	3	–	7	3	–	7
Black Hills State	2	–	8	3	–	8
South Dakota Mines	2	–	8	3	–	8
New Mexico Highlands	2	–	8	2	–	8
$ – Conference champion; ^ – NCAA Division II playoff participant; Rankings from AFCA Poll

== Postseason ==
=== Super Region 1 ===
First round November 23
Shepherd	31
4	IUP	27
3	Notre Dame (OH)	31
West Chester	24
Tiffin	31
2	Kutztown	33

Second round November 30
1	Slippery Rock	51
Shepherd	30
3	Notre Dame (OH)	20
2	Kutztown	17

Quarterfinals; December 7
1	Slippery Rock	65
3	Notre Dame (OH)	59

=== Super Region 2 ===
First round November 23
West Florida	38
4	Wingate	17
3	Bowie State	9
Carson–Newman	17
Miles	7
2	Lenoir–Rhyne	36

Second round November 30
1	Valdosta State	35
West Florida	38
Carson–Newman	21
2	Lenoir–Rhyne	49

Quarterfinals; December 7
West Florida	43
2	Lenoir–Rhyne	38

=== Super Region 3 ===
First round November 23
Indianapolis	27
4	Central Missouri	37
3	NW Missouri State	7
Harding	6
Lindenwood	41
2	Ouachita Baptist	38

Second round November 30
1	Ferris State	37
4	Central Missouri	10
3	NW Missouri State	63
Lindenwood	7

Quarterfinals; December 7
1	Ferris State	25
3	NW Missouri State	3

=== Super Region 4 ===
First round November 23
Augustana (SD)	0
4	CSU Pueblo	17
3	Colorado Mines	24
Sioux Falls	21
TAMU Commerce	23
2	Tarleton State	16

Second round November 30
1	Minnesota State	35
4	CSU Pueblo	7
3	Colorado Mines	3
TAMU Commerce	23

Quarterfinals; December 7
1	Minnesota State	42
TAMU Commerce	21

=== Semifinals ===
Teams that advanced to the semifinals were seeded.

Semifinals; December 14; Hosted by higher seeded team
1	Ferris State	14
4	West Florida	28
2	Slippery Rock	15
3	Minnesota State	58

National Championship; December 21; McKinney ISD Stadium, McKinney, TX
4	West Florida	48
3	Minnesota State	40

== See also ==
- 2019 NCAA Division I FBS football season
- 2019 NCAA Division I FCS football season
- 2019 NCAA Division III football season
- 2019 NAIA football season
