= 2019 NCAA Division II football rankings =

- Season: 2019
- Postseason: Single-elimination
- Preseason No. 1: Valdosta State
- National champions: West Florida
- Conference with most teams in final AFCA poll: PSAC (5)

The 2019 NCAA Division II football rankings are from the AFCA Coaches and from D2Football.com. This is for the 2019 season.

== Legend ==
	Increase in ranking
	Decrease in ranking
	Not ranked previous week or no change
	Selected for College Football Playoff
(#–#)	Win–loss record
(Italics)	Number of first place votes
т	Tied with team above or below also with this symbol

== AFCA Coaches poll ==
	Preseason Aug 26	Week 1 Sep 9	Week 2 Sep 16	Week 3 Sep 23	Week 4 Sep 30	Week 5 Oct 7	Week 6 Oct 14	Week 7 Oct 21	Week 8 Oct 28	Week 9 Nov 4	Week 10 Nov 11	Week 11 Nov 18	Week 12 (Final) Dec 23	
1.	Valdosta State (29)	Valdosta State (1–0) (31)	Valdosta State (2–0) (31)	Valdosta State (3–0) (30)	Valdosta State (4–0) (30)	Valdosta State (5–0) (30)	Valdosta State (6–0) (30)	Valdosta State (7–0) (30)	Valdosta State (8–0) (29)	Valdosta State (8–0) (29)	Valdosta State (9–0) (28)	Valdosta State (10–0) (30)	West Florida (13–2) (31)	1.
2.	Ferris State (3)	Ferris State (1–0)	Ferris State (2–0) (1)	Ferris State (3–0) (1)	Ferris State (4–0) (1)	Ferris State (5–0) (1)	Ferris State (6–0) (1)	Ferris State (7–0)	Ferris State (8–0) (1)	Ferris State (9–0) (1)	Ferris State (10–0) (1)	Ferris State (10–0)	Minnesota State (14–1)	2.
3.	Minnesota State	Minnesota State (1–0)	Minnesota State (2–0)	Minnesota State (3–0)	Minnesota State (4–0)	Minnesota State (5–0)	Minnesota State (6–0)	Minnesota State (7–0)	Minnesota State (8–0)	Tarleton State (9–0) (1)	Tarleton State (10–0) (2)	Tarleton State (11–0) (1)	Ferris State (12–1)	3.
4.	Notre Dame (OH)	Notre Dame (OH) (1–0)	Tarleton State (2–0)	Tarleton State (3–0) (1)	Tarleton State (4–0) (1)	Tarleton State (5–0) (1)	Tarleton State (6–0) (1)	Tarleton State (7–0) (1)	Tarleton State (8–0) (1)	Minnesota State (9–0)	Minnesota State (10–0)	Minnesota State (11–0)	Lenoir–Rhyne (13–1)	4.
5.	Ouachita Baptist	Tarleton State (1–0)	Notre Dame (OH) (2–0)	Notre Dame (OH) (3–0)	Notre Dame (OH) (4–0)	Notre Dame (OH) (5–0) т	Ouachita Baptist (6–0)	Ouachita Baptist (7–0)	Ouachita Baptist (8–0)	Ouachita Baptist (9–0)	Ouachita Baptist (10–0)	Ouachita Baptist (11–0)	Valdosta State (10–1)	5.
6.	Northwest Missouri State	Ouachita Baptist (1–0)	Ouachita Baptist (2–0)	Ouachita Baptist (3–0)	Ouachita Baptist (4–0)	Ouachita Baptist (5–0) т	Notre Dame (OH) (6–0)	Notre Dame (OH) (7–0)	Notre Dame (OH) (8–0)	Notre Dame (OH) (9–0)	Lenoir–Rhyne (10–0)	Lenoir–Rhyne (11–0)	Slippery Rock (13–1)	6.
7.	Tarleton State	Northwest Missouri State (1–0) (1)	Northwest Missouri State (2–0)	Northwest Missouri State (3–0)	Northwest Missouri State (4–0)	Northwest Missouri State (5–0)	Northwest Missouri State (6–0)	Lenoir–Rhyne (7–0)	Lenoir–Rhyne (8–0)	Lenoir–Rhyne (9–0)	Colorado Mines (10–0)	Colorado Mines (11–0)	Northwest Missouri State (12–2)	7.
8.	Lenoir–Rhyne	Lenoir–Rhyne (1–0)	Lenoir–Rhyne (2–0)	Lenoir–Rhyne (3–0)	Lenoir–Rhyne (4–0)	Lenoir–Rhyne (5–0)	Lenoir–Rhyne (6–0)	Indianapolis (6–0)	Indianapolis (7–0)	Colorado Mines (9–0)	Slippery Rock (10–0)	Slippery Rock (11–0)	Colorado Mines (12–1)	8.
9.	CSU Pueblo	Colorado State–Pueblo (1–0)	Colorado State–Pueblo (2–0)	Grand Valley State (3–0)	Grand Valley State (4–0)	Slippery Rock (5–0)	Slippery Rock (6–0)	Colorado Mines (7–0) т	Colorado Mines (8–0)	Slippery Rock (9–0)	Central Missouri (10–0)	Colorado State–Pueblo (10–1)	Tarleton State (11–1)	9.
10.	Slippery Rock	Grand Valley State (1–0)	Grand Valley State (2–0)	Slippery Rock (3–0)	Slippery Rock (4–0)	Indianapolis (5–0)	Indianapolis (6–0)	Slippery Rock (7–0) т	Slippery Rock (8–0)	Central Missouri (9–0)	Colorado State–Pueblo (9–1)	Northwest Missouri State (10–1)	Notre Dame (OH) (12–2)	10.
11.	Fort Hays State	Slippery Rock (1–0)	Slippery Rock (2–0)	Texas A&M–Commerce (2–0)	Indianapolis (4–0)	Colorado Mines (5–0)	Colorado Mines (6–0)	Central Missouri (7–0)	Central Missouri (8–0)	Colorado State–Pueblo (8–1)	Bowie State (10–0)	Bowie State (11–0)	Texas A&M–Commerce (10–3)	11.
12.	Grand Valley State	Texas A&M–Commerce (1–0)	Texas A&M–Commerce (2–0)	Indianapolis (3–0)	Minnesota–Duluth (4–0)	West Chester (5–0)	West Chester (6–0)	Wingate (7–0)	Wingate (8–0)	Northwest Missouri State (8–1)	Northwest Missouri State (9–1)	Harding (10–1)	Colorado State–Pueblo (11–2)	12.
13.	Texas A&M–Commerce	Minnesota–Duluth (1–0)	Minnesota–Duluth (2–0)	Minnesota–Duluth (3–0)	Colorado Mines (4–0)	Pittsburg State (5–0)	Wingate (6–0)	Colorado State–Pueblo (6–1)	Colorado State–Pueblo (7–1)	Bowie State (9–0)	Kutztown (10–0)	Notre Dame (OH) (10–1)	Central Missouri (11–2)	13.
14.	Minnesota–Duluth	West Georgia (1–0)	Indianapolis (2–0)	Colorado Mines (3–0)	West Chester (4–0)	Wingate (5–0)	Central Missouri (6–0)	Northwest Missouri State (6–1)	Northwest Missouri State (7–1)	Grand Valley State (8–1)	Harding (9–1)	Indianapolis (9–1)	Ouachita Baptist (11–1)	14.
15.	West Georgia	Indianapolis (1–0)	West Georgia (2–0)	Midwestern State (3–0)	Pittsburg State (4–0)	Central Missouri (5–0)	Colorado State–Pueblo (5–1)	Bowie State (7–0)	Bowie State (8–0)	Kutztown (9–0)	Notre Dame (OH) (9–1)	Central Missouri (10–1)	Harding (10–2)	15.
16.	Indianapolis	Midwestern State (1–0)	Midwestern State (2–0)	West Chester (3–0)	Wingate (4–0)	IUP (5–0)	Bowie State (6–0)	Grand Valley State (6–1)	Grand Valley State (7–1)	Harding (8–1)	Indianapolis (8–1)	Wingate (10–1)	Kutztown (11–2)	16.
17.	Colorado Mines	Colorado Mines (1–0)	Colorado Mines (2–0)	Wingate (3–0)	Central Missouri (4–0)	Colorado State–Pueblo (4–1)	Grand Valley State (5–1)	Kutztown (7–0)	Kutztown (8–0)	Indianapolis (7–1)	Wingate (9–1)	Kutztown (10–1)	Indianapolis (9–2)	17.
18.	Harding	Wingate (1–0)	West Chester (2–0)	Pittsburg State (3–0)	Colorado State–Pueblo (3–1)	Bowie State (5–0)	Kutztown (6–0)	Harding (6–1)	Harding (7–1)	Wingate (8–1)	IUP (9–1)	IUP (10–1)	Bowie State (11–1)	18.
19.	Hillsdale	West Chester (1–0)	Wingate (2–0)	Central Missouri (3–0)	IUP (4–0)	Grand Valley State (4–1)	Pittsburg State (5–1)	IUP (6–1)	IUP (7–1)	IUP (8–1)	Grand Valley State (8–2)	Tiffin (9–1)	Wingate (10–2)	19.
20.	Midwestern State	West Alabama (1–0)	West Alabama (2–0)	Colorado State–Pueblo (2–1)	Bowie State (4–0)	Texas A&M–Commerce (3–1)	Texas A&M–Commerce (4–1)	West Florida (5–1)	West Florida (6–1)	West Florida (7–1)	Henderson State (9–1)	West Florida (8–2)	Carson–Newman (9–3)	20.
21.	Wingate	Central Missouri (1–0)	Central Missouri (2–0)	IUP (3–0)	Texas A&M–Commerce (2–1)	Kutztown (5–0)	Harding (5–1)	West Chester (6–1)	Angelo State (7–1)	Angelo State (8–1)	Tiffin (8–1)	Texas A&M–Commerce (8–2)	IUP (10–2)	21.
22.	West Chester	Harding (0–1)	Pittsburg State (2–0)	Harding (2–1)	Harding (3–1)	Harding (4–1)	IUP (5–1)	Angelo State (6–1)	West Chester (7–1)	Henderson State (8–1)	West Florida (7–2)	West Chester (9–2)	Shepherd (10–3)	22.
23.	Ashland	Pittsburg State (1–0)	Harding (1–1)	Bowie State (3–0)	Angelo State (4–0)	Minnesota–Duluth (4–1)	Minnesota–Duluth (5–1)	Henderson State (6–1)	Henderson State (7–1)	Truman State (8–1)	Texas A&M–Commerce (7–2)	Truman State (9–2)	Tiffin (9–2)	23.
24.	West Alabama	IUP (1–0)	IUP (2–0)	West Alabama (2–1)	Kutztown (4–0)	Truman State (5–0)	West Florida (4–1)	Texas A&M–Commerce (4–2)	Texas A&M–Commerce (5–2)	Texas A&M–Commerce (6–2)	West Chester (8–2)	Henderson State (9–2)	West Chester (9–3)	24.
25.	Fairmont State	Fort Hays State (0–1)	Bowie State (2–0)	Saginaw Valley State (3–0)	West Alabama (3–1)	West Florida (4–1)	Angelo State (5–1)	Virginia Union (6–1)	Truman State (7–1)	Tiffin (7–1)	Truman State (8–2)	Carson–Newman (8–2)	Lindenwood (9–4)	25.
	Preseason Aug 26	Week 1 Sep 9	Week 2 Sep 16	Week 3 Sep 23	Week 4 Sep 30	Week 5 Oct 7	Week 6 Oct 14	Week 7 Oct 21	Week 8 Oct 28	Week 9 Nov 4	Week 10 Nov 11	Week 11 Nov 18	Week 12 (Final) Dec 23	
		Dropped: Hillsdale; Ashland; Fairmont State	Dropped: Fort Hays State	Dropped: West Georgia	Dropped: Midwestern State; Saginaw Valley State	Dropped: Angelo State; West Alabama	Dropped: Truman State	Dropped: Pittsburg State; Minnesota–Duluth	Dropped: Virginia Union	Dropped: West Chester	Dropped: Angelo State	Dropped: Grand Valley State	Dropped: Truman State; Henderson State	

== D2Football.com poll ==
	Preseason Sep 1	Week 1 Sep 10	Week 2 Sep 17	Week 3 Sep 24	Week 4 Oct 1	Week 5 Oct 8	Week 6 Oct 15	Week 7 Oct 22	Week 8 Oct 29	Week 9 Nov 5	Week 10 Nov 12	Week 11 Nov 19	Week 12 (Final) Dec 31	
1.	Valdosta State	Valdosta State (1–0)	Valdosta State (2–0)	Valdosta State (3–0)	Valdosta State (4–0)	Valdosta State (5–0)	Valdosta State (6–0)	Valdosta State (7–0)	Valdosta State (8–0)	Valdosta State (8–0)	Valdosta State (9–0)	Valdosta State (10–0)	West Florida (13–2)	1.
2.	Ferris State	Ferris State (1–0)	Ferris State (2–0)	Ferris State (3–0)	Ferris State (4–0)	Ferris State (5–0)	Ferris State (6–0)	Ferris State (7–0)	Ferris State (8–0)	Ferris State (9–0)	Ferris State (10–0)	Ferris State (10–0)	Minnesota State (14–1)	2.
3.	Minnesota State	Minnesota State (1–0)	Minnesota State (2–0)	Minnesota State (3–0)	Minnesota State (4–0)	Minnesota State (5–0)	Minnesota State (6–0)	Minnesota State (7–0)	Minnesota State (8–0)	Minnesota State (9–0)	Minnesota State (10–0)	Minnesota State (11–0)	Ferris State (12–1)	3.
4.	Ouachita Baptist	Ouachita Baptist (1–0)	Ouachita Baptist (2–0)	Ouachita Baptist (3–0)	Ouachita Baptist (4–0)	Ouachita Baptist (5–0)	Ouachita Baptist (6–0)	Ouachita Baptist (7–0)	Ouachita Baptist (8–0)	Ouachita Baptist (9–0)	Ouachita Baptist (10–0)	Ouachita Baptist (11–0)	Lenoir–Rhyne (13–1)	4.
5.	Tarleton State	Tarleton State (1–0)	Tarleton State (2–0)	Tarleton State (3–0)	Tarleton State (4–0)	Tarleton State (5–0)	Tarleton State (6–0)	Tarleton State (7–0)	Tarleton State (8–0)	Tarleton State (9–0)	Tarleton State (10–0)	Tarleton State (11–0)	Valdosta State (10–1)	5.
6.	Northwest Missouri State	Northwest Missouri State (1–0)	Northwest Missouri State (2–0)	Northwest Missouri State (3–0)	Northwest Missouri State (4–0)	Northwest Missouri State (5–0)	Northwest Missouri State (6–0)	Notre Dame (OH) (7–0)	Notre Dame (OH) (8–0)	Notre Dame (OH) (9–0)	Lenoir–Rhyne (10–0)	Lenoir–Rhyne (11–0)	Northwest Missouri (12–2)	6.
7.	CSU Pueblo	Colorado State–Pueblo (1–0)	Colorado State–Pueblo (2–0)	Minnesota–Duluth (3–0)	Minnesota–Duluth (4–0)	Notre Dame (OH) (5–0)	Notre Dame (OH) (6–0)	Indianapolis (6–0)	Indianapolis (7–0)	Lenoir–Rhyne (9–0)	Colorado Mines (10–0)	Colorado Mines (11–0)	Texas A&M–Commerce (11–1)	7.
8.	Fort Hays State	Minnesota–Duluth (1–0)	Minnesota–Duluth (2–0)	Grand Valley State (3–0)	Grand Valley State (4–0)	Indianapolis (5–0)	Indianapolis (6–0)	Lenoir–Rhyne (7–0)	Lenoir–Rhyne (8–0)	Colorado Mines (9–0)	Slippery Rock (10–0)	Slippery Rock (11–0)	Tarleton State (11–1)	8.
9.	Minnesota–Duluth	Grand Valley State (1–0)	Grand Valley State (2–0)	Notre Dame (OH) (3–0)	Notre Dame (OH) (4–0)	Lenoir–Rhyne (5–0)	Lenoir–Rhyne (6–0)	Colorado Mines (7–0)	Colorado Mines (8–0)	Slippery Rock (9–0)	Colorado State–Pueblo (9–1)	Colorado State–Pueblo (10–1)	Slippery Rock (13–1)	9.
10.	Grand Valley State	Notre Dame (OH) (1–0)	Notre Dame (OH) (2–0)	Indianapolis (3–0)	Indianapolis (4–0)	Colorado Mines (5–0)	Colorado Mines (6–0)	Slippery Rock (7–0)	Slippery Rock (8–0)	Colorado State–Pueblo (8–1)	Central Missouri (10–0)	Harding (10–1)	Colorado Mines (12–1)	10.
11.	Notre Dame (OH)	Indianapolis (1–0)	Indianapolis (2–0)	Texas A&M–Commerce (3–0)	Lenoir–Rhyne (4–0)	Slippery Rock (5–0)	Slippery Rock (6–0)	Colorado State–Pueblo (6–1)	Colorado State–Pueblo (7–1)	Central Missouri (9–0)	Harding (9–1)	Northwest Missouri State (10–1)	Notre Dame (OH) (12–2)	11.
12.	Indianapolis	Texas A&M–Commerce (1–0)	Texas A&M–Commerce (2–0)	Lenoir–Rhyne (3–0)	Colorado Mines (4–0)	Colorado State–Pueblo (4–1)	Colorado State–Pueblo (5–1)	Wingate (7–0)	Wingate (8–0)	Harding (8–1)	Northwest Missouri State (9–1)	Bowie State (11–0)	Central Missouri (11–2)	12.
13.	Texas A&M–Commerce	West Georgia (1–0)	West Georgia (2–0)	Colorado Mines (3–0)	Slippery Rock (4–0)	West Chester (5–0)	West Chester (6–0)	Central Missouri (7–0)	Central Missouri (8–0)	Grand Valley State (8–1)	Bowie State (10–0)	Indianapolis (9–1)	Colorado State–Pueblo (10–1)	13.
14.	West Georgia	Lenoir–Rhyne (1–0)	Lenoir–Rhyne (2–0)	Midwestern State (3–0)	Colorado State–Pueblo (3–1)	Wingate (5–0)	Wingate (6–0)	Harding (6–1)	Harding (7–1)	Northwest Missouri State (8–1)	Indianapolis (8–1)	Central Missouri (10–1)	Harding (10–2)	14.
15.	Lenoir–Rhyne	Colorado Mines (1–0)	Colorado Mines (2–0)	Slippery Rock (3–0)	West Chester (4–0)	Central Missouri (5–0)	Central Missouri (6–0)	Grand Valley State (6–1)	Grand Valley State (7–1)	Bowie State (9–0)	Kutztown (10–0)	Notre Dame (OH) (10–1)	Ouachita Baptist (11–1)	15.
16.	Harding	Midwestern State (1–0)	Midwestern State (2–0)	Colorado State–Pueblo (2–1)	Wingate (4–0)	Harding (4–1)	Harding (5–1)	Northwest Missouri State (6–1)	Northwest Missouri State (7–1)	Indianapolis (7–1)	Notre Dame (OH) (9–1)	IUP (10–1)	Kutztown (11–2)	16.
17.	Colorado Mines	Slippery Rock (1–0)	Slippery Rock (2–0)	West Chester (3–0)	Central Missouri (4–0)	Pittsburg State (5–0)	Grand Valley State (5–1)	Bowie State (7–0)	Bowie State (8–0)	Kutztown (9–0)	IUP (9–1)	Wingate (10–1)	Carson–Newman (9–3)	17.
18.	Midwestern State	West Chester (1–0)	West Chester (2–0)	Wingate (3–0)	Harding (3–1)	Grand Valley State (4–1)	Minnesota–Duluth (5–1)	Kutztown (7–0)	Kutztown (8–0)	Angelo State (8–1)	Wingate (9–1)	Kutztown (10–1)	Wingate (10–2)	18.
19.	West Chester	Wingate (1–0)	Wingate (2–0)	Central Missouri (3–0)	Pittsburg State (4–0)	Minnesota–Duluth (4–1)	Texas A&M–Commerce (5–1)	Angelo State (6–1)	Angelo State (7–1)	West Florida (7–1)	Grand Valley State (8–2)	West Florida (8–2)	Indianapolis (9–2)	19.
20.	Ashland	Central Missouri (1–0)	Central Missouri (2–0)	Harding (2–1)	Texas A&M–Commerce (3–1)	Texas A&M–Commerce (4–1)	Bowie State (6–0)	West Florida (5–1)	West Florida (6–1)	IUP (8–1)	Henderson State (9–1)	Texas A&M–Commerce (9–2)	Bowie State (11–1)	20.
21.	Hillsdale	Harding (0–1)	Harding (1–1)	Pittsburg State (3–0)	IUP (4–0)	IUP (5–0)	Pittsburg State (5–1)	IUP (6–1)	IUP (7–1)	Wingate (8–1)	West Florida (7–2)	Tiffin (9–1)	Shepherd (10–3)	21.
22.	Slippery Rock	Fort Hays State (0–1)	Pittsburg State (2–0)	West Georgia (2–1)	Bowie State (4–0)	Bowie State (5–0)	Kutztown (6–0)	West Chester (6–1)	West Chester (7–1)	Henderson State (8–1)	Texas A&M–Commerce (8–2)	Augustana (SD) (9–2)	Lindenwood (9–4)	22.
23.	Wingate	Pittsburg State (1–0)	West Alabama (2–0)	IUP (3–0)	Angelo State (4–0)	Kutztown (5–0)	Angelo State (5–1)	Henderson State (6–1)	Henderson State (7–1)	Texas A&M–Commerce (7–2)	Angelo State (8–2)	Henderson State (9–2)	IUP (10–2)	23.
24.	Pittsburg State	West Alabama (1–0)	Ashland (1–1)	Bowie State (3–0)	Midwestern State (3–1)	Truman State (5–0)	West Florida (4–1)	Texas A&M–Commerce (5–2)	Texas A&M–Commerce (6–2)	Fort Hays State (7–2)	Tiffin (8–1)	Carson–Newman (8–2)	Tiffin (9–2)	24.
25.	West Alabama	Ashland (0–1)	IUP (2–0)	Saginaw Valley State (3–0)	Kutztown (4–0)	West Florida (4–1)	IUP (5–1)	Virginia Union (6–1)	Fort Hays State (6–2)	Missouri Western State (7–2)	Augustana (SD) (8–2)	Shepherd (9–2)	Augustana (SD) (9–3)	25.
	Preseason Sep 1	Week 1 Sep 10	Week 2 Sep 17	Week 3 Sep 24	Week 4 Oct 1	Week 5 Oct 8	Week 6 Oct 15	Week 7 Oct 22	Week 8 Oct 29	Week 9 Nov 5	Week 10 Nov 12	Week 11 Nov 19	Week 12 (Final) Dec 31	
		Dropped: Hillsdale	Dropped: Fort Hays State	Dropped: West Alabama; Ashland	Dropped: West Georgia; Saginaw Valley State	Dropped: Angelo State; Midwestern State	Dropped: Truman State	Dropped: Minnesota–Duluth; Pittsburg State	Dropped: Virginia Union	Dropped: West Chester	Dropped: Fort Hays State; Missouri Western State	Dropped: Grand Valley State; Angelo State	Dropped: Henderson State	
