= 2010 Shepherd Rams football team =

American college football season

2010 Shepherd Rams football

WVIAC champion

NCAA Division II Semifinal, L 17–29 at Delta State
- Conference: West Virginia Intercollegiate Athletic Conference

Ranking
- AFCA: No. 7
- Record: 12–2 (7–1 WVIAC)
- Head coach: Monte Cater (24th season)
- Offensive coordinator: Ernie McCook (1st season)
- Defensive coordinator: Josh Kline (2nd season)
- Home stadium: Ram Stadium

2010 West Virginia Intercollegiate Athletic Conference football standings
	Conf.			Overall
Team	W		L	W		L
No. 7 Shepherd $^	7	–	1	12	–	2
West Virginia Wesleyan	6	–	2	9	–	2
West Liberty	6	–	2	7	–	3
Concord	5	–	3	8	–	3
Charleston (WV)	4	–	4	6	–	5
Glenville State	4	–	4	5	–	6
Fairmont State	3	–	5	5	–	6
Seton Hill	1	–	7	2	–	9
West Virginia State	0	–	8	0	–	10
$ – Conference champion; ^ – NCAA Division II playoff participant; Rankings from AFCA Poll

The 2010 Shepherd Rams football team represented Shepherd University as a member of the West Virginia Intercollegiate Athletic Conference (WVIAC) during the 2010 NCAA Division II football season. Led by 24th-year head coach Monte Cater, the Rams compiled an overall record of 12–2 with a conference mark of 7–1, winning the WVIAC title. Shepherd advanced to the NCAA Division II playoffs, where they beat Shaw in the first round, Kutztown in the second round, and Mercyhurst in the quarterfinals before losing in the semifinals at Delta State. The Rams played their home games at Ram Stadium in Shepherdstown, West Virginia.

== Regular season ==
The 2010 regular season for the Rams consisted of eight games against WVIAC conference opponents and two non-conference games against Shippensburg and St. Joseph's (IN). The Rams went 9–1 in the regular season and advanced to the 2010 NCAA Division II football playoffs.

== Playoffs ==
The Rams won their first playoff game, at home against Shaw. The team then went on to win two straight games on the road, against Kutztown and Mercyhurst, before losing in the semifinal round to Delta State.

== Schedule ==
Date	Time	Opponent	Rank	Site	Result	Source
August 28	1:00 p.m.	at Shippensburg*		Seth Grove Stadium; Shippensburg, PA	W 35–27	
September 11	12:00 p.m.	St. Joseph's (IN)*		Ram Stadium; Shepherdstown, WV	W 55–0	
September 18	12:00 p.m.	Fairmont State		Ram Stadium; Shepherdstown, WV	W 19–16	
September 25	3:00 p.m.	at Seton Hill		Offutt Field; Greensburg, PA	W 46–17	
October 2	1:00 p.m.	at Charleston (WV)		Laidley Field; Charleston, WV	W 28–13	
October 9	12:00 p.m.	Concord	No. 21	Ram Stadium; Shepherdstown, WV	W 49–35	
October 16	12:00 p.m.	No. 21 West Virginia Wesleyan	No. 18	Ram Stadium; Shepherdstown, WV	W 37–26	
October 23	1:00 p.m.	at West Liberty	No. 15	West Family Stadium; West Liberty, WV	W 53–38	
October 30	1:00 p.m.	at West Virginia State	No. 11	Lakin Field; Institute, WV	W 56–19	
November 13	12:00 p.m.	Glenville State	No. 9	Ram Stadium; Shepherdstown, WV	L 28–24	
November 20	12:00 p.m.	No. 25 Shaw*	No. 18	Ram Stadium; Shepherdstown, WV (NCAA Division II First Round)	W 40–6	
November 27	12:00 p.m.	at No. 13 Kutztown*	No. 18	Andre Reed Stadium; Kutztown, PA (NCAA Division II Second Round)	W 41–34	
December 4	2:00 p.m.	at No. 11 Mercyhurst*	No. 18	Saxon Stadium; Erie, PA (NCAA Division II Quarterfinal)	W 49–14	
December 11	2:00 p.m.	at No. 2 Delta State*	No. 18	McCool Stadium; Cleveland, MI (NCAA Division II Semifinal)	L 17–29	
*Non-conference game; Rankings from AFCA Poll released prior to the game; All times are in Eastern time
