= 2013 Shepherd Rams football team =

American college football season

2013 Shepherd Rams football

MEC champion

NCAA Division II Quarterfinal, L 7–28 vs. West Chester
- Conference: Mountain East Conference

Ranking
- AFCA: No. 9
- Record: 11–1 (9–0 MEC)
- Head coach: Monte Cater (27th season)
- Offensive coordinator: Ernie McCook (4th season)
- Defensive coordinator: Josh Kline (5th season)
- Home stadium: Ram Stadium

2013 Mountain East Conference football standings
	Conf.			Overall
Team	W		L	W		L
No. 9 Shepherd $^	9	–	0	11	–	1
Concord	7	–	2	8	–	3
Urbana	7	–	2	7	–	4
Charleston (WV)	6	–	3	6	–	5
Glenville State	5	–	4	6	–	5
West Virginia Wesleyan	5	–	4	5	–	5
Notre Dame (OH)	4	–	5	5	–	6
West Liberty	3	–	6	3	–	8
Fairmont State	2	–	7	3	–	7
Virginia–Wise #	2	–	7	2	–	9
West Virginia State	0	–	10	0	–	11
$ – Conference champion; ^ – NCAA Division II playoff participant; # – Provisional NCAA Division II member; Rankings from AFCA poll

The 2013 Shepherd Rams football team represented Shepherd University as a member of the Mountain East Conference (MEC) during the 2013 NCAA Division II football season. Led by 27th-year head coach Monte Cater, the Rams compiled an overall record of 11–1 with a mark of 9–0 in conference play, winning the MEC title. Shepherd advanced to the NCAA Division II Football Championship playoffs and received a first-round bye. They beat Winston-Salem State in the second round before losing to West Chester in the quarterfinals. The Rams played their home games at Ram Stadium in Shepherdstown, West Virginia.

This was Shepherd's first season as a member of the MEC, having been a member of the now-defunct West Virginia Intercollegiate Athletic Conference.

== Regular season ==
The 2013 regular season for the Rams consisted of nine games against MEC conference opponents and one non-conference game against Shippensburg of the Pennsylvania State Athletic Conference (PSAC). The Rams went undefeated 10–0 in the regular season and advanced to the 2013 NCAA Division II football playoffs as the number one seed in Super Region 1. The Rams won the MEC Championship after a season finale win against Concord.

== Playoffs ==
The Rams won their first playoff game, a second round game at home against Winston-Salem State, after receiving a bye in the first round. The team then went on to lose their quarterfinal game, 28–7, against the third-seeded West Chester.

== Schedule ==
Date	Time	Opponent	Rank	Site	Result	Attendance	Source
September 7	12:00 p.m.	No. 7 Shippensburg*	No. 25	Ram Stadium; Shepherdstown, WV	W 33–0	6,247	
September 14	1:00 p.m.	at Fairmont State	No. 17	Duvall-Rosier Field; Fairmont, WV	W 27–7	1,772	
September 21	12:00 p.m.	Urbana	No. 15	Ram Stadium; Shepherdstown, WV	W 28–21	3,468	
September 28	1:00 p.m.	at West Virginia Wesleyan	No. 14	Cebe Ross Field; Buckhannon, WV	W 45–10	400	
October 5	12:00 p.m.	Charleston (WV)	No. 12	Ram Stadium; Shepherdstown, WV	W 28–9	5,219	
October 12	12:00 p.m.	at Virginia–Wise	No. 12	Carl Smith Stadium; Wise, VA	W 42–17	1,010	
October 19	12:00 p.m.	Notre Dame (OH)	No. 11	Ram Stadium; Shepherdstown, WV	W 57–17	4,117	
November 2	12:00 p.m.	at Glenville State	No. 9	I.L. and Sue Morris Stadium; Glenville, WV	W 45–19	1,301	
November 9	12:00 p.m.	West Virginia State	No. 7	Ram Stadium; Shepherdstown, WV	W 47–0	5,039	
November 16	1:00 p.m.	at Concord	No. 7	Callaghan Stadium; Athens, WV	W 41–33	2,503	
November 30	12:00 p.m.	No. 9 Winston-Salem State*	No. 6	Ram Stadium; Shepherdstown, WV (NCAA Division II Second Round)	W 7–0	6,012	
December 7	12:00 p.m.	No. 15 West Chester*	No. 6	Ram Stadium; Shepherdstown, WV (NCAA Division II Quarterfinal)	L 7–28	4,817	
*Non-conference game; Rankings from AFCA Poll released prior to the game; All times are in Eastern time
