= 2017 Shepherd Rams football team =

American college football season

2017 Shepherd Rams football

MEC champion

NCAA Division II first round, L 17–29 vs. Findlay
- Conference: Mountain East Conference

Ranking
- AFCA: No. 14
- Record: 10–1 (10–0 MEC)
- Head coach: Monte Cater (31st season)
- Offensive coordinator: Ernie McCook (8th season)
- Defensive coordinator: Josh Kline (9th season)
- Home stadium: Ram Stadium

2017 Mountain East Conference football standings
	Conf.			Overall
Team	W		L	W		L
No. 14 Shepherd $^	10	–	0	10	–	1
Notre Dame (OH)	8	–	2	8	–	3
Fairmont State	8	–	2	8	–	3
West Virginia State	5	–	5	6	–	5
West Virginia Wesleyan	5	–	5	5	–	6
Virginia–Wise	4	–	6	5	–	6
Urbana	4	–	6	5	–	6
Charleston (WV)	4	–	6	4	–	6
Glenville State	3	–	7	4	–	7
West Liberty	3	–	7	3	–	8
Concord	1	–	9	2	–	9
$ – Conference champion; ^ – NCAA Division II playoff participant; Rankings from AFCA poll

The 2017 Shepherd Rams football team represented Shepherd University during the 2017 NCAA Division II football season as a member of the Mountain East Conference (MEC). They were led by head coach Monte Cater, in his 31st and final season at Shepherd, and finished the season 10–1. With a conference record of 10–0, they were named MEC champions for the third straight year and advanced to the Division II Playoffs, losing in the first round to Findlay. The Rams played their home games at Ram Stadium in Shepherdstown, West Virginia.

This was also the final season for senior quarterback Connor Jessop, who briefly signed with the Washington Redskins practice squad during the 2018 NFL season.

== Preseason ==
After finishing the 2016 season with a record of 13–1, with the only loss coming in the semifinals to North Alabama, the Rams were ranked #7 in the preseason poll.

== Regular season ==
The 2017 regular season for the Rams consisted of 10 games against Mountain East Conference foes. The Rams went undefeated in the regular season and were given the second seed in Super Region I in the 2017 NCAA Division II football playoffs.

== Playoffs ==
Despite going undefeated in the regular season and finishing #2 in the country, the Rams hosted a game in the first round of the playoffs, against seventh-seeded Findlay. This was Findlay's first ever postseason appearance (in the NCAA,) and they defeated Shepherd 29–17 in what was considered an upset.

== Schedule ==
Date	Time	Opponent	Rank	Site	Result	Attendance	Source
September 2	12:00 p.m	Notre Dame (OH)	No. 7	Ram Stadium; Shepherdstown, WV	W 54–49	4,351	
September 16	12:00 p.m.	at Glenville State	No. 4	Ike and Sue Morris Stadium; Glenville, WV	W 42–34	1,176	
September 23	12:00 p.m.	West Virginia State	No. 4	Ram Stadium; Shepherdstown, WV	W 56–41	4,295	
September 30	12:00 p.m.	at Concord	No. 3	Callaghan Stadium; Athens, WV	W 49–20	1,311	
October 7	12:00 p.m.	West Liberty	No. 3	Ram Stadium; Shepherdstown, WV	W 51–14	4,719	
October 12	7:00 p.m.	at Fairmont State	No. 2	Duvall-Rosier Field; Fairmont, WV	W 28–23	1,330	
October 21	12:00 p.m.	Urbana	No. 2	Ram Stadium; Shepherdstown, WV	W 48–14	3,541	
October 28	12:00 p.m.	at West Virginia Wesleyan	No. 2	Cebe Ross Field; Buckhannon, WV	W 45–14	1,827	
November 4	12:00 p.m.	Charleston (WV)	No. 2	Ram Stadium; Shepherdstown, WV	W 49–12	5,238	
November 11	1:00 p.m.	at Virginia–Wise	No. 2	Carl Smith Stadium; Wise, VA	W 63–35	951	
November 18	12:00 p.m.	Findlay*	No. 2	Ram Stadium; Shepherdstown, WV (NCAA Division II First Round)	L 17–29	4,451	
*Non-conference game; Rankings from AFCA Poll released prior to the game; All times are in Eastern time
