= 2007 Shepherd Rams football team =

American college football season

2007 Shepherd Rams football

WVIAC champion

NCAA Division II Championship, quarterfinals, L 38-58 vs. California (PA)
- Conference: West Virginia Intercollegiate Athletic Conference

Ranking
- AFCA: No. 13
- Record: 10–2 (7–1 WVIAC)
- Head coach: Monte Cater (21st season)
- Home stadium: Ram Stadium

2007 West Virginia Intercollegiate Athletic Conference football standings
| | Conf. | | | Overall |
| Team | W | | L | W | | L |
|---|---|---|---|---|---|---|
| No. 13 Shepherd $^ | 7 | – | 1 | 10 | – | 2 |
| Charleston (WV) | 6 | – | 2 | 8 | – | 3 |
| West Liberty | 6 | – | 2 | 8 | – | 3 |
| West Virginia State | 5 | – | 3 | 7 | – | 3 |
| Glenville State | 5 | – | 3 | 6 | – | 5 |
| Fairmont State | 3 | – | 5 | 6 | – | 5 |
| Seton Hill # | 3 | – | 5 | 3 | – | 7 |
| West Virginia Wesleyan | 1 | – | 7 | 3 | – | 8 |
| Concord | 0 | – | 8 | 1 | – | 10 |
$ – Conference champion; ^ – NCAA Division II playoff participant; # – Provisional Division II member; Rankings from AFCA Poll

The 2007 Shepherd Rams football team represented Shepherd University during the 2007 NCAA Division II football season as a member of the West Virginia Intercollegiate Athletic Conference. They were led by head coach Monte Cater, in his 21st season as head coach, and finished the season 10–2. With a conference record of 7–1, they were the WVIAC champions and advanced to the Division II Playoffs, losing in the quarterfinals at California (PA). The Rams played their home games at Ram Stadium in Shepherdstown, West Virginia.

== Regular season ==
The 2007 regular season for the Rams consisted of eight games against WVIAC opponents, and one game each against Shippensburg and Millersville. The Rams went 9–1 in the regular season and advanced to the 2007 NCAA Division II football playoffs as the number two seed in Super Region 4.

With their 42–7 victory over West Virginia State, the Rams won their fourth straight WVIAC Championship.

== Playoffs ==
The Rams won their first playoff game, a second round game at home against IUP, after receiving a bye in the first round. The team then went on to lose their quarterfinal game, 58–38 against California (PA).

== Schedule ==
| Date | Time | Opponent | Rank | Site | Result | Source |
|---|---|---|---|---|---|---|
| August 25 | 12:00 p.m | Millersville* | No. 8 | Ram Stadium; Shepherdstown, WV | W 36–7 | |
| September 1 | 12:00 p.m. | Shippensburg* | No. 9 | Ram Stadium; Shepherdstown, WV | W 19–14 | |
| September 15 | 12:00 p.m. | at Glenville State | No. 10 | Ike and Sue Morris Stadium; Glenville, WV | L 13–24 | |
| September 22 | 1:00 p.m. | at Fairmont State | No. 21 | Duvall-Rosier Field; Fairmont, WV | W 31–10 | |
| September 29 | 12:00 p.m. | Seton Hill | No. 22 | Ram Stadium; Shepherdstown, WV | W 44–6 | |
| October 6 | 12:00 p.m. | Charleston | No. 21 | Ram Stadium; Shepherdstown, WV | W 49–13 | |
| October 13 | 12:00 p.m. | at Concord University | No. 18 | Callaghan Stadium; Athens, WV | W 41–17 | |
| October 20 | 1:00 p.m. | at West Virginia Wesleyan | No. 17 | Cebe Ross Field; Buckhannon, WV | W 36–28 | |
| October 27 | 12:00 p.m. | West Liberty | No. T-15 | Ram Stadium; Shepherdstown, WV | W 38–21 | |
| November 3 | 12:00 p.m. | West Virginia State | No. 15 | Ram Stadium; Shepherdstown, WV | W 42–7 | |
| November 24 | 12:00 p.m. | IUP* | No. 14 | Ram Stadium; Shepherdstown, WV (NCAA Division II second round) | W 41–34 | |
| December 7 | 12:00 p.m. | at California (PA)* | No. 13 | Adamson Stadium; California, PA (NCAA Division II quarterfinal) | L 38–58 | |
*Non-conference game; Rankings from AFCA Poll released prior to the game; All times are in Eastern time
