= 2012 Shepherd Rams football team =

American college football season

2012 Shepherd Rams football

WVIAC champion

NCAA Division II first round, L 17–27 vs. IUP
- Conference: West Virginia Intercollegiate Athletic Conference

Ranking
- AFCA: No. 25
- Record: 8–3 (7–1 WVIAC)
- Head coach: Monte Cater (26th season)
- Offensive coordinator: Ernie McCook (3rd season)
- Defensive coordinator: Josh Kline (4th season)
- Home stadium: Ram Stadium

2012 West Virginia Intercollegiate Athletic Conference football standings
	Conf.			Overall
Team	W		L	W		L
No. 25 Shepherd $^	7	–	1	8	–	3
Charleston (WV)	6	–	2	9	–	2
Concord	6	–	2	7	–	4
Glenville State	6	–	2	6	–	5
West Liberty	4	–	4	6	–	5
Fairmont State	4	–	4	4	–	6
West Virginia Wesleyan	2	–	6	3	–	8
West Virginia State	1	–	7	2	–	9
Seton Hill	0	–	8	0	–	11
$ – Conference champion; ^ – NCAA Division II playoff participant; Rankings from AFCA Poll

The 2012 Shepherd Rams football team represented Shepherd University during the 2012 NCAA Division II football season as a member of the West Virginia Intercollegiate Athletic Conference (WVIAC). They were led by head coach Monte Cater, in his 26th season at Shepherd, and finished the season 8–3. With a conference mark of 7–1, they were named WVIAC champions and advanced to the Division II Playoffs, losing in the first round against IUP.

The Rams played their home games at Ram Stadium in Shepherdstown, West Virginia.

This was the final year for the WVIAC, as most of the teams in the conference withdrew to form the Mountain East Conference for the 2013 season.

== Regular season ==
The 2012 regular season for the Rams consisted of eight games against WVIAC opponents, and one game each against American International and Shippensburg. Shepherd finished the regular season 8–2, and advanced to the NCAA Division II playoffs.

== Playoffs ==
Shepherd lost in the first round of the payoffs, 27–17, against IUP.

== Schedule ==
Date	Time	Opponent	Rank	Site	Result	Source
September 1	1:00 p.m	at Shippensburg*	No. 19	Seth Grove Stadium; Shippensburg, PA	L 28–38	
September 8	12:00 p.m.	American International*		Ram Stadium; Shepherdstown, WV	W 34–7	
September 15	12:00 p.m.	at Seton Hill		Offutt Field; Greensburg, PA	W 42–6	
September 22	1:00pm	at Charleston (WV)		Laidley Field; Charleston, WV	W 16–10	
September 29	12:00 p.m.	Concord		Ram Stadium; Shepherdstown, WV	W 20–6	
October 6	12:00 p.m.	West Virginia Wesleyan^{†}		Ram Stadium; Shepherdstown, WV	W 37–6	
October 13	1:00 p.m.	at West Liberty	No. 25	West Family Stadium; West Liberty, WV	L 16–17	
October 20	1:00 p.m.	at West Virginia State		Lakin Field; Institute, WV	W 41–20	
November 3	12:00 p.m.	Glenville State		Ram Stadium; Shepherdstown, WV	W 34–23	
November 10	12:00 p.m.	Fairmont State		Ram Stadium; Shepherdstown, WV	W 49–23	
November 17	12:00 p.m.	at IUP*	No. 25	Miller Stadium; Indiana, PA (NCAA Division II first round)	L 17–27	
*Non-conference game; ^{†}Homecoming; Rankings from AFCA Poll released prior to the game; All times are in Eastern time
