= 2005 Shepherd Rams football team =

American college football season

2005 Shepherd Rams football

WVIAC champion

NCAA Division II Second Round, L 21–28 vs. C.W. Post
- Conference: West Virginia Intercollegiate Athletic Conference

Ranking
- AFCA: No. 20
- Record: 11–1 (8–0 WVIAC)
- Head coach: Monte Cater (19th season)
- Home stadium: Ram Stadium

2005 West Virginia Intercollegiate Athletic Conference football standings
	Conf.			Overall
Team	W		L	W		L
No. 20 Shepherd $^	8	–	0	11	–	1
Glenville State	7	–	1	9	–	2
Charleston (WV)	6	–	2	8	–	3
West Liberty	4	–	4	6	–	5
Fairmont State	4	–	4	4	–	6
Concord	3	–	5	4	–	7
West Virginia Wesleyan	2	–	6	3	–	8
West Virginia State	2	–	6	2	–	9
West Virginia Tech	0	–	8	0	–	11
$ – Conference champion; ^ – NCAA Division II playoff participant; Rankings from AFCA poll

The 2005 Shepherd Rams football team represented Shepherd University as a member of the West Virginia Intercollegiate Athletic Conference (WVIAC) during the 2005 NCAA Division II football season. Led by 19th-year head coach Monte Cater, the Rams compiled an overall record of 11–1 with a mark of 8–0 in conference play, winning the WVIAC title. Shepherd advanced to the NCAA Division II Football Championship playoffs, receiving a first-round bye before losing in the second round to C.W. Post.

The Rams played their home games at Ram Stadium in Shepherdstown, West Virginia.

== Regular season ==
The 2005 regular season for the Rams consisted of eight games against WVIAC opponents and three non-conference games, one each against Virginia State, Shippensburg, and Slippery Rock. Shepherd finished the regular season 11–0.

== Playoffs ==
Shepherd received a first round bye in the playoffs by way of earning the top seed in Super Region I. In the second round, the team hosted C.W. Post, losing 28–21.

== Schedule ==
Date	Time	Opponent	Rank	Site	Result	Source
August 27	1:00 p.m.	Virginia State*		Ram Stadium; Shepherdstown, WV	W 24–6	
September 3	1:00 p.m.	Shippensburg*		Ram Stadium; Shepherdstown, WV	W 34–32	
September 10	1:00 p.m.	at Slippery Rock*		Mihalik-Thompson Stadium; Slippery Rock, PA	W 24–7	
September 17	1:00 p.m.	at Glenville State		I. L. & Sue Morris Stadium; Glenville, WV	W 34–13	
September 24	1:00 p.m.	at Fairmont State	No. 25	Duvall-Rosier Field; Fairmont, WV	W 14–11	
October 1	1:00 p.m.	West Virginia Tech	No. 23	Ram Stadium; Shepherdstown, WV	W 56–7	
October 8	1:00 p.m.	Charleston (WV)	No. 21	Ram Stadium; Shepherdstown, WV	W 27–0	
October 15	12:00 p.m.	at Concord	No. 16	Callaghan Stadium; Athens, WV	W 48–21	
October 22	1:00 p.m.	at West Virginia Wesleyan	No. 15	Cebe Ross Field; Buckhannon, WV	W 51–0	
October 29	1:00 p.m.	West Liberty^{†}	No. 10	Ram Stadium; Shepherdstown, WV	W 34–7	
November 5	1:00 p.m.	West Virginia State	No. 8	Ram Stadium; Shepherdstown, WV	W 51–10	
November 19	1:00 p.m.	C.W. Post*	No. 6	Ram Stadium; Shepherdstown, WV (NCAA Division II Second Round)	L 21–28	
*Non-conference game; ^{†}Homecoming; Rankings from AFCA Poll released prior to the game; All times are in Eastern time
