= 2006 Shepherd Rams football team =

American college football season

2006 Shepherd Rams football

WVIAC champion

NCAA Division II quarterfinal, L 21–24 vs. Bloomsburg
- Conference: West Virginia Intercollegiate Athletic Conference

Ranking
- AFCA: No. 8
- Record: 11–1 (7–0 WVIAC)
- Head coach: Monte Cater (20th season)
- Home stadium: Ram Stadium

2006 West Virginia Intercollegiate Athletic Conference football standings
	Conf.			Overall
Team	W		L	W		L
No. 8 Shepherd $^	7	–	0	11	–	1
West Liberty State	4	–	3	7	–	4
Charleston (WV)	4	–	3	5	–	6
Glenville State	4	–	3	5	–	6
Fairmont State	3	–	4	4	–	7
Concord	3	–	4	3	–	8
West Virginia State	2	–	5	5	–	6
West Virginia Wesleyan	1	–	6	2	–	8
$ – Conference champion; ^ – NCAA Division II playoff participant; Rankings from AFCA Poll

The 2006 Shepherd Rams football team represented Shepherd University during the 2006 NCAA Division II football season as a member of the West Virginia Intercollegiate Athletic Conference (WVIAC). They were led by head coach Monte Cater, in his 20th season at Shepherd, and finished the season 11–1. With a conference record of 7–0, they were named WVIAC champions and advanced to the Division II Playoffs, losing in the quarterfinal round against Bloomsburg.

The Rams played their home games at Ram Stadium in Shepherdstown, West Virginia.

== Preseason ==
The Rams entered the 2006 season as the 16th ranked team in the country.

== Regular season ==
The 2006 regular season for the Rams consisted of 7 games against WVIAC opponents, and one game each against Millersville, Shippensburg, and C.W. Post. The Rams went undefeated in the regular season and were given the top seed in Super Region I in the 2006 NCAA Division II football playoffs.

With their win over West Liberty on November 4, Shepherd clinched the WVIAC title.

== Playoffs ==
Shepherd received a first round bye in the playoffs by way of earning the #1 seed in Super Region I. In the second round, the team hosted Merrimack, and won the game 31–7, before losing in the quarterfinals against Bloomsburg.

== Schedule ==
Date	Time	Opponent	Rank	Site	Result	Source
August 26	4:00 p.m	at Millersville*	No. 16	Chryst Field; Millersville, PA	W 28–7	
September 2	1:00 p.m.	at Shippensburg*	No. 15	Seth Grove Stadium; Shippensburg, PA	W 14–0	
September 16	12:00 p.m.	C.W. Post*	No. 14	Ram Stadium; Shepherdstown, WV	W 24–0	
September 23	12:00 p.m.	Glenville State	No. 9	Ram Stadium; Shepherdstown, WV	W 23–6	
September 30	12:00 p.m.	Fairmont State	No. 9	Ram Stadium; Shepherdstown, WV	W 20–0	
October 14	1:00 p.m.	at Charleston	No. 7	Laidley Field; Charleston, WV	W 17–0	
October 21	12:00 p.m.	Concord^{†}	No. 5	Ram Stadium; Shepherdstown, WV	W 42–0	
October 28	12:00 p.m.	West Virginia Wesleyan	No. 5	Ram Stadium; Shepherdstown, WV	W 41–0	
November 4	1:00 p.m.	at West Liberty	No. 5	Russek Field; West Liberty, WV	W 34–32	
November 11	1:00 p.m.	at WV State	No. 5	Lakin Field; Institute, WV	W 38–12	
November 25	12:00 p.m.	Merrimack*	No. 5	Ram Stadium; Shepherdstown, WV (NCAA Division II second round)	W 31–7	
December 2	12:00 p.m.	Bloomsburg*	No. 5	Ram Stadium; Shepherdstown, WV (NCAA Division II quarterfinal)	L 21–24	
*Non-conference game; ^{†}Homecoming; Rankings from AFCA Poll released prior to the game; All times are in Eastern time
