= List of West Virginia Intercollegiate Athletic Conference football standings =

This is a list of yearly West Virginia Intercollegiate Athletic Conference football standings.

== WVIAC standings ==
2012 West Virginia Intercollegiate Athletic Conference football standings
	Conf.			Overall
Team	W		L	W		L
No. 25 Shepherd $^	7	–	1	8	–	3
Charleston (WV)	6	–	2	9	–	2
Concord	6	–	2	7	–	4
Glenville State	6	–	2	6	–	5
West Liberty	4	–	4	6	–	5
Fairmont State	4	–	4	4	–	6
West Virginia Wesleyan	2	–	6	3	–	8
West Virginia State	1	–	7	2	–	9
Seton Hill	0	–	8	0	–	11
$ – Conference champion; ^ – NCAA Division II playoff participant; Rankings from AFCA Poll
