= Shepherd Rams football =

Football team of Shepherd University

2025 Shepherd Rams football team
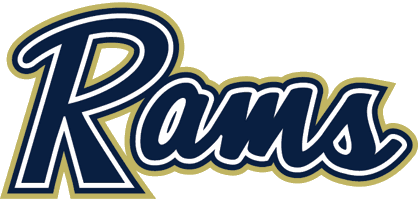
- First season: 1920; 106 years ago
- Athletic director: Chauncey Winbush
- Head coach: Ernie McCook; 8th season, 59–18 (.766)
- Location: Shepherdstown, West Virginia
- Stadium: Ram Stadium (capacity: 5,000)
- NCAA division: Division II
- Conference: PSAC
- Division: East
- Colors: Blue and gold
- All-time record: 560–339–26 (.619)

Conference championships
- 1955, 1972, 1982, 1983, 1986, 1988, 1991, 1992, 1994, 1997, 1998, 1999, 2004, 2005, 2006, 2007, 2010, 2012, 2013, 2015, 2016, 2017

Division championships
- 1976, 1977, 1978, 1980, 2022
- Rivalries: Frostburg State; Shippensburg
- Marching band: RAM Band
- Outfitter: Under Armour
- Website: Shepherd Rams football

The Shepherd Rams football program represents Shepherd University in college football at the NCAA Division II level in the Pennsylvania State Athletic Conference. Shepherd has played its home games at Ram Stadium since 1959.

== History ==
=== Monte Cater era ===
Monte Cater served as the head football coach at Shepherd University from 1987 to 2017, becoming the winningest coach in both Shepherd and West Virginia college football history. Over his 31 seasons at the helm, Cater compiled a record of 245–93–1, leading the Rams to 17 conference championships and 13 postseason appearances.

Before Cater's arrival, Shepherd had made the postseason only a handful of times. In 1983, the Rams reached the playoffs for the first time in school history, losing to Carson–Newman 42–21 in the opening round of the NAIA playoffs. They returned to the postseason in 1986 and again fell to Carson–Newman, 30–10. In 1991, Shepherd advanced to the playoffs and lost to Central State 34–22. The Rams finally earned their first-ever postseason win in 1992, defeating Carson–Newman 6–3 before falling to Gardner–Webb 22–7 in the next round.

Under Cater's leadership, Shepherd became a dominant program in the West Virginia Intercollegiate Athletic Conference (WVIAC), winning 12 conference titles. When the university transitioned to the newly formed Mountain East Conference (MEC) in 2013, Cater continued the program's success, capturing four MEC championships in five seasons.

One of the hallmark seasons of Cater's tenure came in 2015, when Shepherd went 13–1 and reached the NCAA Division II Football Championship game for the first time in program history, ultimately falling to Northwest Missouri State.

On December 5, 2015, with a win over Slippery Rock in the Super 1 Region Final, Cater achieved his 250th victory as a college football coach.

On January 24, 2018, Cater announced his retirement after 31 seasons at Shepherd. He was replaced by longtime assistant Ernie McCook. Cater had been the active wins leader in all levels of college football with 274 career victories. Cater led Shepherd to 13 post season trips, 2 NAIA and 11 NCAA DII. 3 NCAA DII semifinal appearances (2010, 2015 & 2016) and a national championship game appearance in 2015.

=== Moving to the PSAC ===
On May 31, 2018, Shepherd University accepted an invitation to join the Pennsylvania State Athletic Conference as a full-time member, with competition beginning in the 2019–20 academic year. The move came after the PSAC Board of Directors approved the university's admission.

Shepherd's addition followed the departure of Cheyney University of Pennsylvania, which exited NCAA Division II competition after the 2017–18 season. With Shepherd's arrival, the PSAC maintained its 18-member structure heading into 2019. The Rams joined the PSAC Eastern Division, aligning them with Commonwealth University-Bloomsburg, East Stroudsburg University of Pennsylvania, Kutztown University of Pennsylvania, Commonwealth University-Lock Haven, Commonwealth University-Mansfield, Millersville University of Pennsylvania, Shippensburg University of Pennsylvania, and West Chester University.

=== Ernie McCook era ===
The current head coach is Ernie McCook, a 1992 graduate of Wesley College. McCook was elevated to head coach after the retirement of longtime coach Monte Cater. McCook previously served as offensive line coach at Shepherd from 1999 to 2008 and was also the offensive coordinator starting in 2000. McCook was elevated to assistant head coach in 2007. He spent the 2009 season as running game coordinator/tight ends coach at Liberty University, before returning to Shepherd the next season, where he served as assistant head coach/offensive coordinator for the next seven years.

After the 2021 football season, Junior QB Tyson Bagent won the Harlon Hill Trophy for most outstanding Division II player, the first Shepherd player to win the award.

== Head coaches ==
Coach	Tenure
A. D. Kenamond	1920
Withrow Legge	1921–1924
John Newcome	1925–1941
Cletus Lowe	1946–1947
Don L. Phillips	1948–1950
William M. Moore	1951–1952
Donald E. Fuoss	1953–1955
Jesse Riggleman	1956–1966
Roger Parker	1967–1970
Walter Barr	1971–1985
Mike Jacobs	1986
Monte Cater	1987–2017
Ernie McCook	2018–present

== Conference affiliations ==
- Independent (1920–1924)
- West Virginia Intercollegiate Athletic Conference (1925–2012)
- Mountain East Conference (2013–2018)
- Pennsylvania State Athletic Conference (2019–present)

== Championships ==
=== Conference championships ===
Shepherd claims 22 conference championships

Year	Conference	Coach	Overall record	Conference record
1955	WVIAC	Donald E. Fuoss	8–0	4–0
1972	WVIAC	Walter Barr	7–3	5–0
1982	WVIAC	Walter Barr	7–2–1	7–1
1983	WVIAC	Walter Barr	9–2	8–0
1986	WVIAC	Mike Jacobs	8–3	7–0
1988†	WVIAC	Monte Cater	6–4	6–1
1991	WVIAC	Monte Cater	8–3	7–0
1992	WVIAC	Monte Cater	9–3	7–0
1994†	WVIAC	Monte Cater	6–4	5–1
1997†	WVIAC	Monte Cater	9–1	6–0
1998	WVIAC	Monte Cater	10–2	7–0
1999	WVIAC	Monte Cater	9–2	6–0
2004	WVIAC	Monte Cater	7–3	7–0
2005	WVIAC	Monte Cater	11–1	8–0
2006	WVIAC	Monte Cater	11–1	7–0
2007	WVIAC	Monte Cater	10–2	7–1
2010	WVIAC	Monte Cater	12–2	7–1
2012	WVIAC	Monte Cater	8–3	7–1
2013	Mountain East Conference	Monte Cater	11–1	9–0
2015	Mountain East Conference	Monte Cater	13–1	10–0
2016	Mountain East Conference	Monte Cater	13–1	10–0
2017	Mountain East Conference	Monte Cater	10–1	10–0

† Co-champions

=== Division championships ===
Year	Division	Coach	CG Opponent	Result
1976	WVIAC Northern	Walter Barr	Concord	L 7–21
1977†	WVIAC Northern	Walter Barr	N/A lost tiebreaker to West Virginia Wesleyan	
1978	WVIAC Northern	Walter Barr	Concord	L 14–35
1980†	WVIAC Northern	Walter Barr	Concord	L 0–19
2022	PSAC East	Ernie McCook	Indiana (PA)	L 21–24

† Co-champions

== Awards and honors ==
=== National awards ===
Harlon Hill Trophy
Year	Player	Class	Position	Date awarded	Ref.
2021	Tyson Bagent	JR	QB	January 14, 2022	

== Seasons ==
Year	Team	Overall	Conference	Standing	Bowl/playoffs	Final ranking^{#}
Shepherd Rams (West Virginia Intercollegiate Athletic Conference) (1925–1955)
1955	Shepherd	8-0	4-0	1st		
Shepherd Rams (West Virginia Intercollegiate Athletic Conference (NAIA) (1956–1994)
1956	Shepherd	6-2	4-1	3rd		
1957	Shepherd	3-4	2-2	6th		
1958	Shepherd	5-2-1	4-0-1	2nd		
1959	Shepherd	4-4	3-2	2nd (Eastern)		
1960	Shepherd	5-3	2-2	T-4th (Eastern)		
1961	Shepherd	5-2	1-2	—		
1962	Shepherd	7-1-1	1-1-2	2nd (Eastern)		
1963	Shepherd	7-1-1	2-1-1	2nd (Eastern)		
1964	Shepherd	3-5	2-2	6th		
1965	Shepherd	2-5	0-3	—		
1966	Shepherd	1-8	0-4	10th		
1967	Shepherd	3-5	1-1	—		
1968	Shepherd	2-7	0-3	10th		
1969	Shepherd	6-4	1-3	7th		
1970	Shepherd	5-5	2-2	5th		
1971	Shepherd	7-1-2	3-1-2	5th		
1972	Shepherd	7-3	5-0	1st		
1973	Shepherd	6-4	4-2	4th (Northern)		
1974	Shepherd	2-9	1-6	4th (Northern)		
1975	Shepherd	8-3	5-2	2nd (Northern)		
1976	Shepherd	10-2	4-0	1st (Northern)		5
1977	Shepherd	6-4	3-1	T-1st (Northern)		
1978	Shepherd	7-4	6-3	T-1st (Northern)		
1979	Shepherd	5-5	5-4	4th (Northern)		
1980	Shepherd	7-3-1	6-2-1	1st (Northern)		19
1981	Shepherd	7-2	6-2	2nd		16
1982	Shepherd	7-2-1	7-1	1st		10
1983	Shepherd	9-2	8-0	1st	L NAIA Division I Quarterfinal	5
1984	Shepherd	7-3	6-2	2nd		16
1985	Shepherd	5-5	5-2	T-2nd		
1986	Shepherd	8-3	7-0	1st	L NAIA Division I Quarterfinal	7
1987	Shepherd	4–6	3–4	T–4th		
1988	Shepherd	6–4	6–1	T–1st		19
1989	Shepherd	3–7	2–4	T–5th		
1990	Shepherd	6–3–1	4–1–1	T–2nd		11
1991	Shepherd	8–3	7–0	1st	L NAIA Division I Quarterfinal	6
1992	Shepherd	9–3	7–0	1st	L NAIA Division I Semifinal	6
1993	Shepherd	5–5	5–2	T–2nd		
1994	Shepherd	6–4	5–1	T–1st		10
Shepherd Rams (West Virginia Intercollegiate Athletic Conference (Div II) (1995–2012)
1995	Shepherd	3–7	3–4	5th		
1996	Shepherd	7–3	5–2	3rd		
1997	Shepherd	9–1	6–1	T–1st		
1998	Shepherd	10–2	7–0	1st	L NCAA Division II Quarterfinal	13
1999	Shepherd	9–2	6–0	1st	L NCAA Division II First Round	15
2000	Shepherd	7–3	5–2	3rd		
2001	Shepherd	8–2	5–2	T–2nd		
2002	Shepherd	7–3	5–2	T–2nd		
2003	Shepherd	4–6	4–3	T–2nd		
2004	Shepherd	7–3	7–0	1st		
2005	Shepherd	11–1	8–0	1st	L NCAA Division II Second Round	20
2006	Shepherd	11–1	7–0	1st	L NCAA Division II Quarterfinal	8
2007	Shepherd	10–2	7–1	1st	L NCAA Division II Quarterfinal	13
2008	Shepherd	5–5	3–5	T–6th		
2009	Shepherd	6–4	5–3	4th		
2010	Shepherd	12–2	7–1	1st	L NCAA Division II Semifinal	7
2011	Shepherd	9–2	6–2	T–2nd		22
2012	Shepherd	8–3	7–1	1st	L NCAA Division II First Round	25
Shepherd Rams (Mountain East Conference (Div II) (2013–2018)
2013	Shepherd	11–1	9–0	1st	L NCAA Division II Quarterfinal	9
2014	Shepherd	8–2	8–2	2nd		
2015	Shepherd	13–1	10–0	1st	L NCAA Division II Championship	2
2016	Shepherd	13–1	10–0	1st	L NCAA Division II Semifinal	3
2017	Shepherd	10–1	10–0	1st	L NCAA Division II First Round	14
2018	Shepherd	7-3	7-3	3rd		
Shepherd Rams (Pennsylvania State Athletic Conference (Div II) (2019–present)
2019	Shepherd	10-3	6-1	2nd (PSAC East); T-2nd (overall)	L NCAA Division II Second Round	22
2020	Shepherd	1-0	0-0			
2021	Shepherd	13-2	6-1	2nd (PSAC East)	L NCAA Division II Semifinals	5
2022	Shepherd	13-2	7-0	1st (PSAC East)	L NCAA Division II Semifinals	6
2023	Shepherd	9-3	5-2	T–2nd (East); T-3rd (overall)	L NCAA Division II First Round	
2024	Shepherd	6-5	3-4	T-5th (PSAC East); T-9th (overall)		
2025	Shepherd	7-4	6-1	2nd (PSAC East); 2nd (overall)		
2026	Shepherd	8-3	4-3	4th (PSAC East); 6th (overall)		
Total:		290–124–2				
National championship Conference title Conference division title or championship game berth
^{#}AFCA Division II.

=== Postseason results ===
Year	First Round	Second Round	Quarterfinals	Semifinals	Championship
1998	@ IUP, W 9–6	—	@ Slippery Rock, L 20–31		
1999	@ Millersville, L 14–21				
2005	First round bye	vs. LIU Post, L 21–28			
2006	First round bye	vs. Merrimack, W 31–7	vs. Bloomsburg, L 21–24		
2007	First round bye	vs. IUP, W 41–34	@ California, L 38–58		
2010	vs. Shaw, W 40–6	@ Kutztown, W 41–34	@ Mercyhurst, W 48–14	@ Delta State, L 17–29	
2012	@ IUP, L 17–27				
2013	First round bye	vs. Winston-Salem State, W 7–0	vs. West Chester, L 7–28		
2015	First round bye	vs. IUP, W 17–13	vs. Slippery Rock, W 28–16	vs. Grand Valley State, W 34–32	vs. Northwest Missouri State, L 7–34
2016	vs. Assumption, W 48–31	@ LIU Post, W 40–21	@ California, W 41–30	vs. North Alabama, L 13–23	
2017	vs. Findlay, L 17–29				
2019	@ IUP, W 31–27	@ Slippery Rock, L 30–51			
2021	vs. Findlay, W 38–31	vs. Notre Dame (OH), W 38–34	@ Kutztown W 30–28	@ Ferris State, L 7–55	
2022	vs. New Haven, W 16–13	vs. Slippery Rock, W 37–27	@ IUP, W 48–13	@ Colorado School of Mines, L 13–44	
2023	@ Lenoir–Rhyne, L 17–63				

Note: The NCAA expanded the playoff field from 16 to 24 teams in 2000, from 24 to 28 teams in 2015, and from 28 to 32 teams in 2025..

== Rams on the Next Level ==
=== Drafted players ===
Shepherd has had three football players drafted by the NFL:

- QB John Shearer was taken with the 6th pick in the 28th round of the 1956 NFL draft by the Baltimore Colts and T Bob Hogue was taken with the 11th pick in the 20th round of the 1960 NFL draft, also by the Colts. Neither played in the NFL.
- RB Wayne Wilson was taken with the 21st pick in the 12th round of the 1979 NFL draft by the Houston Oilers. He played for 3 NFL teams from 1979 to 1987.

=== Currently active in the NFL ===
- QB Tyson Bagent Chicago Bears (2023–present)
- WR Cameron Dorner New England Patriots (2026-present)

=== Currently active in the IFL ===
- RB Ron Brown Jr. Arizona Rattlers (2025–present)

=== Currently active in the UFL ===
- OG Joey Fisher 5 teams (2023–present)

=== Other Rams on the Next Level ===
- FS Brian Baumgardner signed with the Charleston Swamp Foxes of the now-defunct AF2 in April 2000.
- DB/KR James Rooths played for the New York Jets, Green Bay Packers, Minnesota Vikings, and Tampa Bay Buccaneers. He also played for NFL Europe's Scottish Claymores for 2 seasons. After his playing career, Rooths was an assistant defensive backs coach with the Frankfurt Galaxy. He was an assistant football coach for Wilde Lake High School in 2010 and was part of the Baltimore Ravens strength and conditioning staff in 2013.
- K/P Ricky Schmitt has played for 6 NFL teams and 2 CFL teams.
- TE Dominique Jones has played in the United Football League, the Indoor Football League, and for 8 NFL teams.
- QB Joel Gordon played with Arena Football League 2's Richmond Speed and the Winterthur Warriors of the Swiss Nationalliga A. Gordon led the Warriors the Swiss Bowl in 2006. Gordon was the QB coach at Shepherd in 2003, 2005–07, and 2011–2015. In 2016 Gordon became the OC at Ferrum College.
- DE Ramal Faunteroy played for AFL2's Manchester Wolves. Faunteroy is currently the defensive line coach at Shepherd. On June 12, 2014, Faunteroy was selected to participate in the Bill Walsh NFL Minority Coaching Fellowship.
- DL/LB Robert Hayes signed with the Portland Thunder of the Arena Football League in December 2014. He also played for the Baltimore Brigade.
- LB Louis Corum played for the United Football League's Virginia Destroyers and the Indoor Football League's now defunct Richmond Revolution.
- DE Howard Jones was signed by the Pittsburgh Steelers after the 2014 NFL draft. He also played for the Tampa Bay Buccaneers and the Chicago Bears.
- DE Shaneil Jenkins was signed by the Denver Broncos following the 2016 NFL draft. He currently plays for the Ottawa RedBlacks of the Canadian Football League.
- WR Billy Brown was signed by the Philadelphia Eagles on May 1, 2017.
- S Tre Sullivan was signed by the Philadelphia Eagles on May 1, 2017 and played for 2 years.
- QB Jeff Ziemba was signed by the CAN-AM Indoor Football League's Baltimore Lightning in late 2017. He played 3 years for the Indoor Football League's Arizona Rattlers where he was named IFL Offensive Player Of The Week for Week 5 in 2018. He was also named the IFL's Offensive Rookie Of The Year for 2018.
- LB Elijah Norris signed with the Chicago Bears on April 28, 2018. He was waived on September 1. Norris was hired as Shepherd's defensive line coach on June 27, 2025.
- OG Lavonte Hights attended rookie minicamp with the Chicago Bears in 2018. He then shortly after signed to play with the Salt Lake Stallions of the now defunct Alliance of American Football in which he played the first and only season of the league.
- QB Connor Jessop signed with the Washington Football Team on August 26, 2018. He was waived on September 1.
- CB DeJuan Neal was selected by the New York Guardians of the revived XFL in Phase 5 of the 2020 XFL draft. Two years later, he was drafted 90th overall by the New Jersey Generals in the 2022 USFL draft. On July 14, 2022, he was signed by the Washington Commanders. and was released on August 30 during final roster cuts. He was drafted by the DC Defenders of the XFL on November 16, 2022.
- WR Devin Phelps signed with the Arizona Cardinals on April 26, 2020. He was released on July 27.
- WR Deonte Glover was drafted by the Edmonton Elks in the 3rd round of the 2021 CFL draft.
- TE Brian Walker was signed by the Baltimore Ravens after the conclusion of the 2023 NFL draft. He was waived on June 13, 2023.
- QB Seth Morgan was invited to Pittsburgh Steelers rookie minicamp on April 28, 2025.
