= List of Central Connecticut Blue Devils men's basketball head coaches =

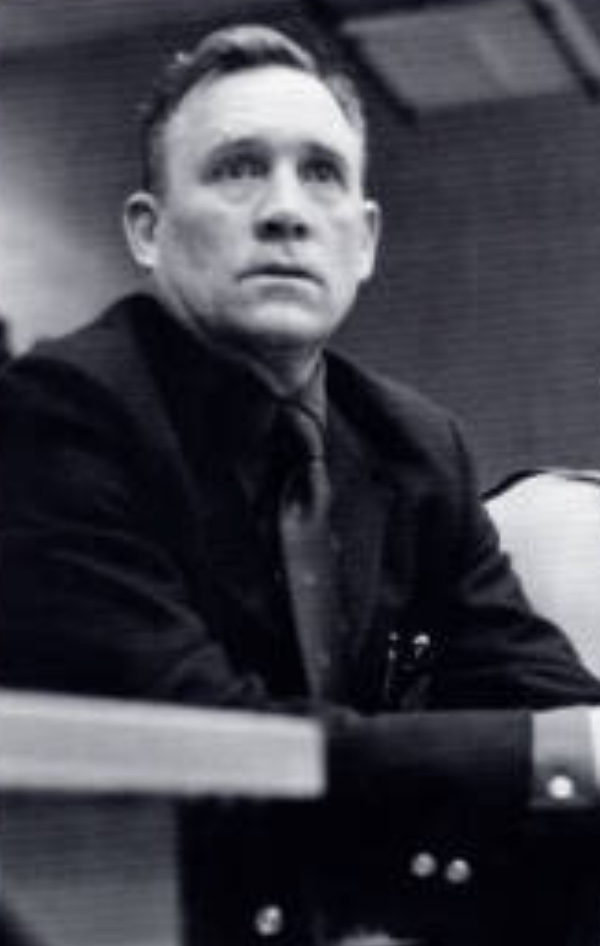
Bill Detrick, the winningest head coach in Blue Devils men's basketball history.

The following is a list of Central Connecticut Blue Devils men's basketball head coaches. There have been 10 head coaches of the Blue Devils in their 87-season history.

Central Connecticut's current head coach is Patrick Sellers. He was hired as the Blue Devils' head coach in May 2021, replacing Donyell Marshall, who stepped down as head coach after the 2020–21 season.

| No. | Tenure | Coach | Years | Record | Pct. |
|---|---|---|---|---|---|
| 1 | 1934–1943 | Harrison J. Kaiser | 9 | 83–55 | .601 |
| 2 | 1944–1945 | Walter Travers | 1 | 5–5 | .500 |
| 3 | 1946–1953 | Ross Merrick | 7 | 100–36 | .735 |
| 4 | 1953–1959 | William M. Moore | 6 | 65–44 | .596 |
| 5 | 1959–1987 (Note: Detrick stepped down five games into the 1987–88 season. Jones was named interim coach for the remainder of the season.) | Bill Detrick | 29 | 468–266 | .638 |
| – | 1987–1988* | Charles Jones | 1 | 8–15 | .348 |
| 6 | 1988–1991 | Mike Brown | 3 | 20–64 | .238 |
| 7 | 1991–1996 | Mark Adams | 5 | 40–95 | .296 |
| 8 | 1996–2016 | Howie Dickenman | 20 | 282–311 | .476 |
| 9 | 2016–2021 | Donyell Marshall | 5 | 40–104 | .278 |
| 10 | 2021–present | Patrick Sellers | 5 | 81–76 | .516 |
| Totals | | 10 coaches | 87 seasons | 1,129–1,040 | .521 |
Records updated through end of 2022–23 season * - Denotes interim head coach. Source
