= 2019 Shepherd Rams football team =

American college football season

2019 Shepherd Rams football

NCAA Division II Second Round, L 30–51 vs. Slippery Rock
- Conference: Pennsylvania State Athletic Conference
- East

Ranking
- AFCA: No. 22
- Record: 10–3 (6–1 PSAC)
- Head coach: Ernie McCook (2nd season)
- Offensive coordinator: Tye Hiatt (1st season)
- Defensive coordinator: Josh Kline (11th season)
- Home stadium: Ram Stadium

2019 Pennsylvania State Athletic Conference football standings
	Conf.			Overall
Team	W		L	W		L
East Division
No. 16 Kutztown xy^	7	–	0	11	–	2
No. 22 Shepherd ^	6	–	1	10	–	3
No. 24 West Chester ^	5	–	2	9	–	3
Shippensburg	4	–	3	4	–	7
Bloomsburg	3	–	4	5	–	6
East Stroudsburg	2	–	5	6	–	5
Millersville	1	–	6	2	–	9
Lock Haven	0	–	7	2	–	9
West Division
No. 6 Slippery Rock xy$^	7	–	0	13	–	1
No. 21 IUP ^	6	–	1	9	–	3
California (PA)	5	–	2	7	–	4
Mercyhurst	3	–	4	6	–	5
Edinboro	3	–	4	3	–	8
Seton Hill	2	–	5	2	–	8
Clarion	1	–	6	3	–	8
Gannon	1	–	6	2	–	9
Championship: Slippery Rock 37, Kutztown 35
$ – Conference champion; x – Division champion/co-champions; y – Championship game participant; ^ – NCAA Division II playoff participant; Rankings from AFCA poll

The 2019 Shepherd Rams football team represented Shepherd University as a member of the East Division of the Pennsylvania State Athletic Conference (PSAC) during the 2019 NCAA Division II football season. Led by second-year head coach Ernie McCook, the Rams compiled an overall record of 10–3 with a mark of 6–1 in conference play, placing second in the PSAC's East Division. Shepherd advanced to the NCAA Division II Football Championship playoffs, where they beat IUP in the first round before losing in the second round at Slippery Rock. The Rams played their home games at Ram Stadium in Shepherdstown, West Virginia.

This was Shepherd's first year as a member of the PSAC, having been a member of the Mountain East Conference from 2012 to 2018.

== Regular season ==
The 2019 regular season for the Rams consisted of 10 games against PSAC conference opponents, and one game against Ohio Dominican. The Rams went 9–2 in the regular season and advanced to the 2019 NCAA Division II football playoffs.

== Playoffs ==
The Rams won their first playoff game, on the road against conference opponent IUP.

The Rams lost their second round playoff game, at PSAC conference opponent Slippery Rock.

== Schedule ==
Date	Time	Opponent	Site	Result	Attendance	Source
September 7	12:00 p.m.	Ohio Dominican	Ram Stadium; Shepherdstown, WV	L 21–24	4,827	
September 14	3:00 p.m.	at Mercyhurst	Saxon Stadium; Erie, PA	W 22–17	1,124	
September 21	1:00 p.m.	at Clarion*	Memorial Stadium; Clarion, PA	W 40–24	1,919	
September 28	1:00 p.m.	Kutztown^{†}	Ram Stadium; Shepherdstown, WV	L 27–34	5,803	
October 3	6:00 p.m.	at Lock Haven	Hubert Jack Stadium; Lock Haven, PA	W 62–28	475	
October 12	12:00 p.m.	Shippensburg	Ram Stadium; Shepherdstown, WV	W 32–30	4,813	
October 19	12:05 p.m.	No. 12 West Chester	Ram Stadium; Shepherdstown, WV	W 35–23	4,059	
October 26	2:00 p.m.	at Millersville	Biemesderfer Stadium; Millersville, PA	W 34–10	3,750	
November 2	12:00 p.m.	East Stroudsburg	Ram Stadium; Shepherdstown, WV	W 76–34	3,981	
November 9	2:00 p.m.	at Bloomsburg	Robert B. Redman Stadium; Bloomsburg, PA	W 42–35	1,357	
November 16	12:00 p.m.	Seton Hill*	Ram Stadium; Shepherdstown, WV	W 56–24	5,237	
November 23	12:00 p.m.	at No. 16 IUP*	Miller Stadium; Indiana, PA (NCAA Division II First Round)	W 31–27	1,594	
November 30	1:00 p.m.	at No. 8 Slippery Rock*	Mihalik-Thompson Stadium; Slippery Rock, PA (NCAA Division II Second Round)	L 30–51	1,385	
*Non-conference game; ^{†}Homecoming; Rankings from AFCA Poll released prior to the game; All times are in Eastern time
