= Tyson Bagent =

American football player (born 2000)

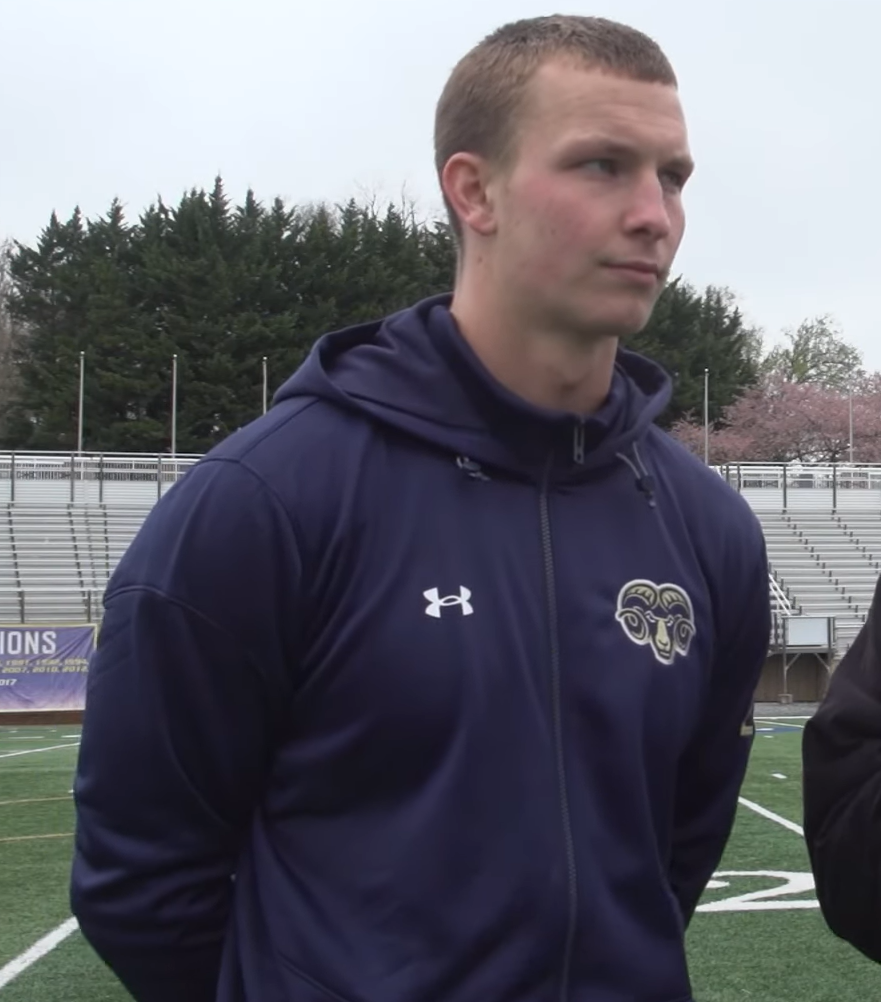
- Bagent in 2023

No. 17 – Chicago Bears
- Position: Quarterback
- Roster status: Active

Personal information
- Born: June 8, 2000 (age 26); Martinsburg, West Virginia, U.S.
- Listed height: 6 ft 3 in (1.91 m)
- Listed weight: 212 lb (96 kg)

Career information
- High school: Martinsburg
- College: Shepherd (2018–2022)
- NFL draft: 2023: undrafted

Career history
- Chicago Bears (2023–present)

Awards and highlights
- Harlon Hill Trophy (2021); Hardman Award (2021); Division II Offensive Player of the Year (2021) (Note: Selected by Don Hansen, D2Football.com, and D2CCA Ron Lenz); 2× First-team DII All-American (2021, 2022); 2× PSAC East Offensive Player of the Year (2021, 2022); First-team All-MEC (2018); 2× First-team All-PSAC East (2021, 2022); Second-team All-PSAC East (2019)

Career NFL statistics as of Week 5, 2026
- Passing attempts: 213
- Passing completions: 141
- Completion percentage: 66.2%
- TD–INT: 3–9
- Passing yards: 1,326
- Passer rating: 70.3
- Stats at Pro Football Reference

Tyson Jacob Bagent (/ˈbeɪdʒənt/ BAY-jənt; born June 8, 2000) is an American professional football quarterback for the Chicago Bears of the National Football League (NFL). He played college football for the Shepherd Rams.

As a five-year starter at Shepherd, Bagent broke almost every quarterback record for the school. He broke the Division II record for completions (1,400) and passing yards (17,034), as well as the NCAA record for passing touchdowns (159). In 2021, Bagent won the Harlon Hill Trophy and the Hardman Award as the top amateur athlete in West Virginia. He was named DII Offensive Player of the Year by almost every outlet. He was also a two-time All-American and PSAC East Offensive Player of the Year.

After not being selected in the 2023 NFL draft, Bagent signed with the Bears as an undrafted free agent. Despite the high unlikelihood of making the final roster, an impressive performance in the preseason earned him a spot for the regular season as the backup quarterback. On October 22, 2023, he became the first Division II undrafted rookie quarterback to start an NFL game since 1950.

== Early life ==
Bagent grew up in Martinsburg, West Virginia as the oldest of four children. His father, Travis Bagent, is a world arm-wrestling champion with 17 titles. Bagent revealed that his father, growing up, "didn't even have running water until he was in high school." He has also credited his father as his "right-hand man". He is of Welsh descent via his grandfather Dave Humphreys, who emigrated from Maentwrog, Gwynedd.

He attended Martinsburg High School, where he played high school football and basketball. In 2017, was named the West Virginia Gatorade Player of the Year after passing for 41 touchdowns. Bagent finished his high school career with 7,800 passing yards and 112 touchdown passes. Bagent was recruited by Division I Football Championship Subdivision schools Robert Morris and Albany, but committed to play college football at Division II school Shepherd University in Shepherdstown, West Virginia.

== College career ==
=== 2018 season ===
Bagent became the starting quarterback for the Shepherd Rams as a freshman in 2018 and made his debut on September 1, 2018, against the Notre Dame Falcons, throwing for 518 yards on 36 completions and 54 attempts with three touchdowns in the 35–33 loss. His completions, attempts, and passing yards were all school records. A week later against Glenville State, Bagent was named Mountain East Conference (MEC) Offensive Player of the Week when he completed 32 of 41 passes for 378 yards and four total touchdowns in a 41–24 win. In their 27–7 road win against West Virginia State, Bagent would win the award for the second-straight week with a 318-yard, two-touchdown performance. Against West Virginia Wesleyan, Bagent set the school and MEC record for touchdown passes in a single game with seven in Shepherd's 58–35 win.

Following the end of the season, Bagent earned First-team All-MEC honors. He finished 253 for 387 in passing attempts, with 3,029 passing yards on 29 touchdowns to just 13 interceptions. Bagent was also awarded Third-team Don Hansen All-Regional.

=== 2019 season ===
In Week 2 of the 2019 season, Bagent completed 36 passes on 54 attempts for 438 yards and three touchdowns. His 36 completions tied his record from the previous season. He would win Pennsylvania State Athletic Conference East Offensive Athlete of the Week award for his performance. A week later, he would win the award again against Clarion when he had 394 yards and five touchdowns. In Week 5, Bagent would be inactive after being injured in their Week 4 matchup. True freshman quarterback, Christian Etchison, took his place and led the Rams to a 62–28 win. Bagent won PSAC East Offensive Athlete of the Week again after throwing for 413 yards and three touchdowns in a win over No. 12 West Chester.

Following the end of the 2019 season, Bagent was named Second-team All-PSAC East after passing for 4,349 yards and 36 touchdowns. He also set the single-season school record for passing percentage with 71.01%.

=== 2020 season ===
Bagent's junior season was canceled due to COVID-19. In the one game he played against Mercyhurst, Bagent was 13-of-19 for 76 yards and one interception in the 38–14 win.

=== 2021 season ===
Against Ohio Dominican, Bagent finished with 26 completions for 346 yards and four touchdowns in a 35–30 win. On September 11, Bagent had five touchdowns and 363 yards in a 56–26 win against Gannon. Against No. 14/19 IUP, Bagent finished 28-of-41 for 468 yards and four touchdowns (one interception) in a 37–21 win. Against Kutztown, he threw for 456 yards and three touchdowns in a 42–35 win. On October 9 against Lock Haven, Bagent helped the Rams put up 75 points in a 75–21 blowout win. He had five touchdowns in the performance. Shepherd finished the regular season with a 10–1 record and they were ranked No. 8 going into the Division II Playoffs. After three wins against unranked Findlay, No. 6/11 Notre Dame (OH), and No. 12/12 Kutztown, Shepherd would run into No. 1/1 Ferris State and they would lose 55–7 in the Division II Semifinal. During that game, Bagent threw for 249 yards on 22 completions, one touchdown, and one interception. He was also sacked three times during the game.

In 2021, Bagent led Division II in completions (391), pass attempts (579), passing yards (5,000), and passing touchdowns (53). This would be the ninth time, fourth time in Division II, that a player has thrown a 5,000-yard, 50-touchdown season. He was named PSAC East Offensive Player of the Year as well as the Harlon Hill Trophy winner and the Hardman Award winner. He was also awarded DII Offensive Player of the Year awards by Don Hansen, D2Football.com, D2CCA Ron Lenz, and was named All-Super Region One Offensive Player of the Year by D2CCA. His Division II All-American honors included the Associated Press (AP), American Football Coaches Association (AFCA), D2CCA, and Don Hansen. He was also named First-team All-PSAC East.

2021 Harlon Hill Trophy Voting
Finalist	1st	2nd	3rd	Total
Tyson Bagent	44	15	7	169
T. J. Davis	17	21	12	105
Al McKeller	7	16	21	74
Michael Zeman	7	16	15	68
Brandon Alt	4	6	10	34
Austin Reed	3	7	10	33
Henry Litwin	4	6	8	32
Calil Wilkins	3	2	6	19

=== 2022 season ===
After the 2021 season, Bagent entered the NCAA transfer portal and visited West Virginia and Maryland, but ultimately opted to stay at Shepherd for his final season of eligibility. On December 3, 2022, Bagent broke the record for touchdown passes across all NCAA divisions with 159, in Shepherd's 48–13 win over IUP during their quarterfinal game. They reached the semifinals of the Division II Playoffs but lost to the Colorado Mines Orediggers.

2022 Harlon Hill Trophy Voting
Finalist	1st	2nd	3rd	Total
John Matocha	37	28	11	178
Caleb Murphy	16	22	25	117
Tyson Bagent	19	16	19	108
Jada Byers	6	10	10	48
T. J. Cole	6	4	11	37
Jarod Bowie	2	6	12	30
Brandon Alt	3	3	2	17
Mario Anderson	3	2	0	13

== Professional career ==
=== Pre-draft ===
Pre-draft measurables
Height	Weight	Arm length	Hand span	Wingspan	40-yard dash	10-yard split	20-yard split	20-yard shuttle	Three-cone drill	Vertical jump	Broad jump
6 ft 3 1/8 in (1.91 m)	213 lb (97 kg)	30 1/8 in (0.77 m)	9 1/2 in (0.24 m)	6 ft 2 7/8 in (1.90 m)	4.79 s	1.58 s	2.75 s	4.36 s	6.95 s	36 in (0.91 m)	10 ft 0 in (3.05 m)
All values from NFL Combine

Following his college career, Bagent participated in the 2023 NFL Scouting Combine and Senior Bowl. He was one of three Division II players invited to the Combine and the only such player at the latter. Senior Bowl director Jim Nagy compared him to Tony Romo as a quarterback from a small college with a similar playing style. Bagent completed 17 of 22 passes for 138 yards and an interception in the game.

Bagent was projected as a late round selection or to not be picked in the 2023 NFL draft. Lance Zierlein, the draft analyst for NFL.com, praised Bagent's confidence as a passer and athleticism but felt his arm strength would be inadequate against professional defenses. Besides his physical attributes, his career against strictly Division II teams was seen as a risk as he would be playing more difficult opponents in the NFL.

After going undrafted, he was signed by the Chicago Bears. Bears offensive coordinator Luke Getsy coached Bagent at the Senior Bowl.

=== 2023 season ===
Following his signing, Bagent was viewed as a developmental player with low chances of making the 53-man roster as the fourth-string quarterback on the Bears' depth chart behind starter Justin Fields and veterans P. J. Walker and Nathan Peterman. After impressing in the preseason, he made the final roster as the third quarterback alongside Fields and Peterman. He was promoted to second string by Week 4.

Bagent made his NFL debut for the Bears against the Minnesota Vikings on October 15 after Fields left the game with an injury. He completed 10-of-14 passes for 83 yards, with one rushing touchdown, a fumble and an interception en route to a 19–13 loss. Due to Fields's injury, Bagent was named as the starter for the Bears Week 7 game against the Las Vegas Raiders. He completed 21-of-29 passes for 162 yards, rushed 24 yards, and also threw one passing touchdown in a 30–12 win. Bagent was the first Bears quarterback to win in his inaugural NFL start since Craig Krenzel in 2004.

On Sunday Night Football, Bagent completed 25-of-37 passes for 232 yards, two interceptions and also had a rushing touchdown in the 30–13 loss against the Los Angeles Chargers. In Week 9, Bagent completed 18-of-30 passes for 220 yards, two touchdowns, and three interceptions while also losing a fumble in a 24–17 loss to the New Orleans Saints. He started one more game on Thursday Night Football the following week against the Carolina Panthers, where he led the Bears to victory 16–13 as he went 20-of-33 for 162 yards.

Fields returned to the starting role in Week 11 and Bagent reverted to being the backup. Bagent threw for 859 yards, three touchdowns, and six interceptions with a 2–2 record during his four-week stint as the Bears' starting quarterback.

=== 2024 season ===
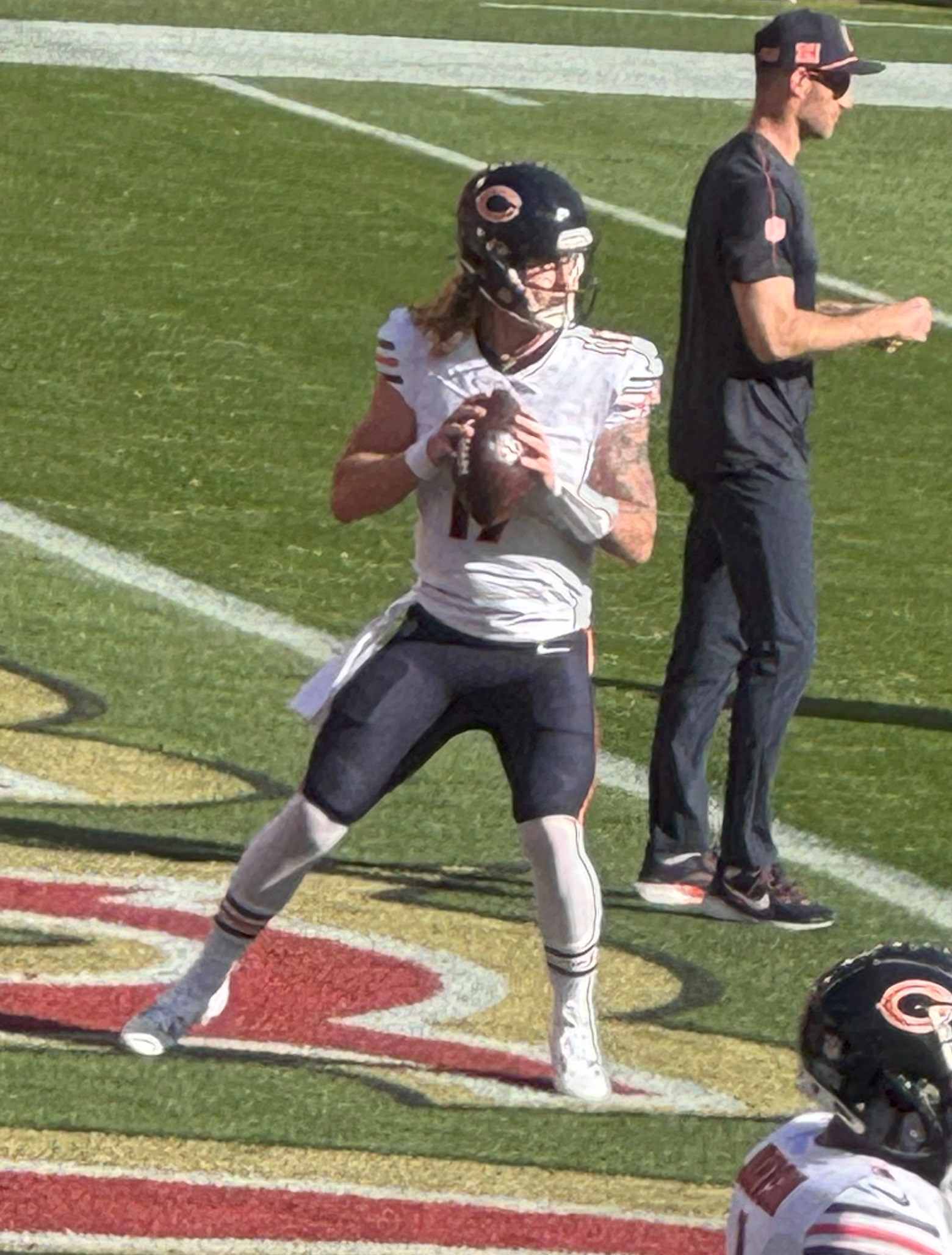
Bagent during pre-game warm-ups in 2024

Bagent entered the 2024 offseason competing with Brett Rypien for the Bears' second-string quarterback slot, the latter having experience under new offensive coordinator Shane Waldron's system, but ultimately secured the job.

He was the backup to rookie Caleb Williams, with limited on-field action.

=== 2025 season ===
On August 20, 2025, Bagent signed a two-year, $10 million contract extension with the Bears. He was in tears after signing the contract and expressed gratitude for the extension, saying that it was a weight off his shoulders as well as his family's shoulders. He stated: "There's definitely a lot of things and people that I think I can certainly help with this gift I've been blessed with." He was the first quarterback to be extended by the Bears since Jay Cutler in 2014.

After competing with newly signed Case Keenum for the spot in the offseason, he remained the second-string quarterback to Williams for the 2025 season. In Chicago's Week 9 win over the Cincinnati Bengals, Bagent lined up at wide receiver for a double pass in which he caught a lateral from Williams before throwing it back, after which Williams ran for an 18-yard gain. According to Bagent, head coach Ben Johnson called the play "Baby Daddy" in tribute to Bagent and his newborn daughter. He also briefly entered the Week 11 game in Minnesota at receiver to draw the attention of pass rusher Andrew Van Ginkel away from Williams.

=== 2026 season ===
Bagent continued to back up Williams in 2026, though he was inactive for the season opener due to a back injury.

When Williams suffered a hamstring injury in Week 2 against the Vikings, Bagent took over for the final two drives. The first ended with a blocked field goal, while Bagent drove the Bears to the opposing 12-yard line on the second before being sacked on the final play to seal the 9–3 defeat. Bagent suffered a concussion that prevented him from practicing in the following days. He was medically cleared in time for Week 3, though Keenum started and played the game.

Reports prior to Week 4's New York Jets game indicated Bagent would be the starter. In response, Johnson had Keenum and Bagent line up for the opening play together, with Bagent at receiver; although Bagent played the rest of the game at quarterback, Keenum was credited with the start. Bagent completed 25 of his attempted 34 passes and threw for 268 yards. He was also intercepted by Minkah Fitzpatrick, becoming the first quarterback to throw an interception against the Jets in 637 days. Nonetheless, the Bears won 23–12.

Bagent struggled in Week 5 against the Green Bay Packers, throwing for just 87 yards and two interceptions. He was replaced by Keenum in the fourth quarter of the 31–7 loss.

== Career statistics ==
Legend
**Bold**	Career high

=== NFL ===
Year	Team	Games			Passing									Rushing					Sacks		Fumbles	
Year	Team	GP	GS	Record	Cmp	Att	Pct	Yds	Y/A	Lng	TD	Int	Rtg	Att	Yds	Y/A	Lng	TD	Sck	Yds	Fum	Lost
2023	CHI	5	4	2–2	**94**	**143**	65.7	**859**	6.0	**41**	**3**	**6**	71.4	**23**	**109**	**4.7**	**20**	**2**	**5**	**35**	**3**	**2**
2024	CHI	4	0	—	2	2	**100.0**	11	5.5	6	0	0	89.6	6	−7	−1.2	0	0	0	0	0	0
2025	CHI	3	0	—	3	4	75.0	47	**11.8**	22	0	0	**113.5**	2	7	3.5	7	0	0	0	1	0
2026	CHI	3	2	0–1	42	64	65.6	409	6.4	37	0	3	63.9	7	18	2.6	7	0	4	34	0	0
Career		15	6	2–3	141	213	66.2	1,326	6.2	41	3	9	70.3	38	127	3.3	20	2	7	52	4	2

=== College ===
Legend
Harlon Hill Trophy
NCAA DII record
Led the NCAA DII

Season	Team	Games		Passing									Rushing			
Season	Team	GP	Record	Cmp	Att	Pct	Yds	Avg	YPG	TD	Int	Rtg	Att	Yds	Avg	TD
2018	Shepherd	10	7–3	253	387	65.4	3,029	7.8	302.9	29	13	149.1	61	6	0.1	3
2019	Shepherd	12	9–3	343	483	**71.0**	4,349	**9.0**	**362.4**	36	13	**165.9**	37	37	1.0	1
2020	Shepherd	1	1–0	13	19	68.4	76	4.0	76.0	0	1	91.5	1	–10	–10.0	0
2021	Shepherd	15	**13–2**	391	**579**	67.5	**5,000**	8.6	333.4	**53**	13	165.8	46	75	**1.6**	3
2022	Shepherd	15	**13–2**	**400**	572	70.0	4,580	8.0	305.4	41	**8**	158.0	**79**	**71**	0.9	**5**
Career		53	43−10	1,400	2,040	68.6	17,034	8.4	321.4	159	48	159.8	224	179	0.8	12

== Career highlights ==
=== Awards and honors ===
==== College ====
- Harlon Hill Trophy (2021)
- Hardman Award (2021)
- Division II Offensive Player of the Year (2021)
- 2× D2CCA All-Super Region One Offensive Player of the Year (2021, 2022)
- AP Division II All-American First Team (2021)
- AP Division II All-American Second Team (2022)
- 2× AFCA Division II Coaches' All-American First Team (2021, 2022)
- D2CCA All-American First Team (2021)
- D2CCA All-American Second Team (2022)
- Don Hansen All-American First Team (2021)
- Don Hansen All-American Second Team (2022)
- D2Football.com Elite 100 First Team (2021)
- D2Football.com Elite 100 Second Team (2022)
- 2× D2CCA All-Super Region One First Team (2021, 2022)
- Don Hansen All-Super Region One Third Team (2018)
- 2× PSAC East Offensive Player of the Year (2021, 2022)
- All-MEC First Team (2018)
- 2× All-PSAC East First Team (2021, 2022)
- All-PSAC East Second Team (2019)

=== Records ===
==== NCAA Division II records ====
- Most completions, career: 1,400
- Most passing yards, career: 17,034
- Most touchdown passes, career: 159
- Most yards of total offense, career: 17,213
- Most games 200+ total yards, season: 14 (2021)
- Most games with 3+ touchdown passes, season: 11 (2021)
- Most touchdown passes by a freshman, game: 7 (October 27, 2018, vs. West Virginia Wesleyan)

==== PSAC records ====
- Most completions, career: 1,147
- Most passing yards per game (min. 4,500 yards), career: 325.7
- Most completions, season: 400 (2022)
- Most pass attempts, season: 579 (2021)
- Most passing yards, season: 5,000 (2021)

==== Shepherd records ====
- Most completions, career: 1,400
- Most pass attempts, career: 2,040
- Most passing yards, career: 17,034
- Most touchdown passes, career: 159
- Most attempts of total offense, career: 2,264
- Most yards of total offense, career: 17,213
- Most touchdowns responsible for, career: 171
- Most games with 300+ passing yards, career: 32
- Most games with 400+ passing yards, career: 10
- Most completions, season: 400 (2022)
- Most pass attempts, season: 579 (2021)
- Most passing yards, season: 5,000 (2021)
- Most touchdown passes, season: 53 (2021)
- Most attempts of total offense, season: 625 (2021)
- Most yards of total offense, season: 5,075 (2021)
- Most touchdowns responsible for, season: 56 (2021)
- Highest completion percentage, season: 71.01% (2019)
- Most games with 300+ passing yards, season: 11 (2021)
- Most games with 400+ passing yards, season: 3 (three times) (2019, 2021, 2022)
- Most completions, game: 42 (September 25, 2021, vs. Kutztown)
- Most pass attempts, game: 56 (September 1, 2018, vs. Notre Dame)
- Most passing yards, game: 518 (September 1, 2018, vs. Notre Dame)
- Most touchdown passes, game: 7 (October 27, 2018, vs. West Virginia Wesleyan)
- Most attempts of total offense, game: 66 (September 1, 2018, vs. Notre Dame)
- Most touchdowns responsible for, game: 7 (October 27, 2018, vs. West Virginia Wesleyan)
