= Monte Cater =

American football coach (born 1949)

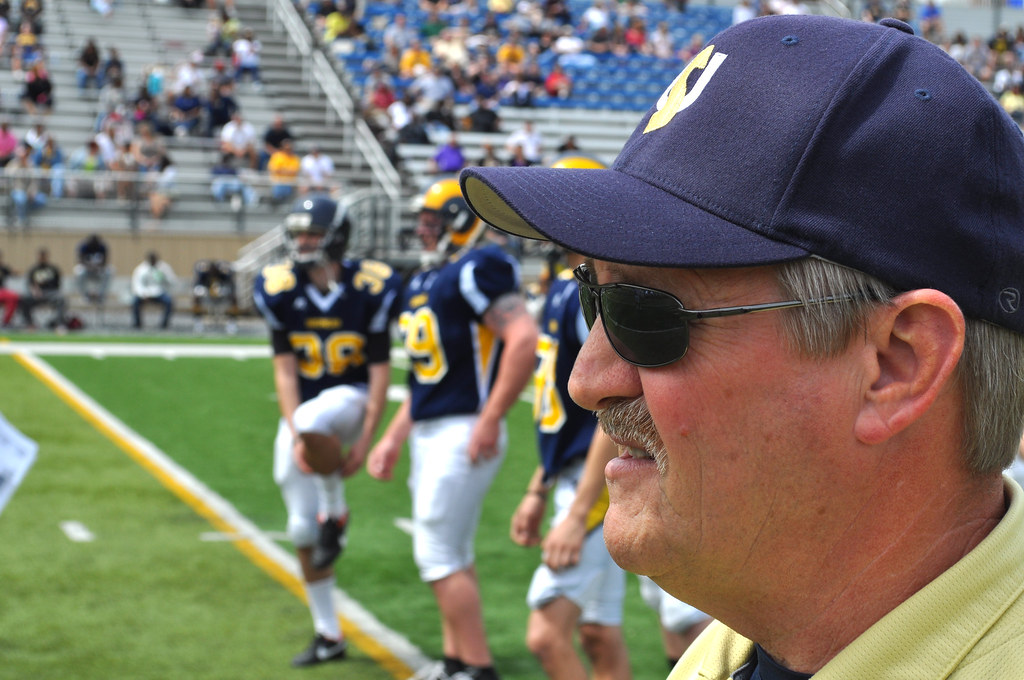

Biographical details
- Born: July 7, 1949 (age 77); Shelbyville, Illinois, U.S.

Coaching career (HC unless noted)
- 1981–1986: Lakeland
- 1987–2017: Shepherd

Administrative career (AD unless noted)
- 1993–2004: Shepherd

Head coaching record
- Overall: 275–117–2
- Tournaments: 1–2 (NAIA playoffs); 13–10 (NCAA D-II playoffs)

Accomplishments and honors

Championships
- 3 IBFC (1985–1986); 12 WVIAC (1988, 1991–1992, 1997–1999, 2004–2007, 2010, 2012); 4 MEC (2013, 2015–2017)

Awards
- 8× WVIAC Coach of the Year (1991–1992, 1997–1999, 2005–2006); 4× MEC Coach of the Year (2013, 2015–2017); AFCA Super Region 1 Coach of the Year (2015); West Virginia Sports Hall of Fame
- College Football Hall of Fame; Inducted in 2023 (profile)

Monte Cater (born July 7, 1949) is an American former football coach. From 1987 to 2017, he was the head football coach at Shepherd University in Shepherdstown, West Virginia. From 1981 to 1986, Cater was the head football coach at Lakeland College in Sheboygan, Wisconsin.

== Coaching career ==
Cater was made the 12th head coach of the Shepherd University Rams football team on February 9, 1987 and also served as the college's athletic director from 1993 to 2004. He is Shepherd College's and the West Virginia Intercollegiate Athletic Conference's all-time winningest coach. He has been awarded the WVIAC Coach of the Year Award seven times, The Journal Coach of the Year Award and has won the WVIAC conference title 12 times.

He was named the Mountain East Conference Coach of the Year in 2013.

Before coming to Shepherd, Cater was the head coach of Lakeland College from 1980 to 1986 and is credited with reviving the college's football program, winning the Illini-Badger Football Conference title three times. He currently resides in Martinsburg, West Virginia with his wife, Bonnie, and their two children, Taylor and Logan.

On December 5, 2015 with a win over Slippery Rock in the Super 1 Region Final, Cater achieved his 250th victory as a college football coach.

On January 24, 2018 Cater announced his retirement after 31 seasons at Shepherd. He was replaced by longtime assistant Ernie McCook. Cater had been the active wins leader in all levels of college football with 274 career victories. Cater led Shepherd to 13 post season trips, 2 NAIA and 11 NCAA DII. 3 NCAA DII semifinal appearances (2010, 2015 & 2016) and a national championship game appearance in 2015.

In 2020 Cater was inducted into the West Virginia Sports Hall of Fame. In 2023 Cater was inducted into the College Football Hall of Fame.

== Head coaching record ==
Year	Team	Overall	Conference	Standing	Bowl/playoffs	AFCA Division II^{#}
Lakeland Muskies (Illini–Badger Football Conference) (1981–1986)
1981	Lakeland	1–7–1	0–5	6th		
1982	Lakeland	3–6	1–3	4th		
1983	Lakeland	6–3	3–1	2nd		
1984	Lakeland	4–5	2–2	T–2nd		
1985	Lakeland	7–2	4–1	1st		
1986	Lakeland	9–1	5–0	1st		
Lakeland:		30–24–1	15–12			
Shepherd Rams (West Virginia Intercollegiate Athletic Conference) (1987–2012)
1987	Shepherd	4–6	3–4	T–4th		
1988	Shepherd	6–4	6–1	T–1st		
1989	Shepherd	3–7	2–4	T–5th		
1990	Shepherd	6–3–1	4–1–1	T–2nd		
1991	Shepherd	8–3	7–0	1st	L NAIA Division I Quarterfinal	
1992	Shepherd	9–3	7–0	1st	L NAIA Division I Semifinal	
1993	Shepherd	5–5	5–2	T–2nd		
1994	Shepherd	6–4	5–1	T–1st		10
1995	Shepherd	3–7	3–4	5th		
1996	Shepherd	7–3	5–2	3rd		
1997	Shepherd	9–1	6–1	T–1st		
1998	Shepherd	10–2	7–0	1st	L NCAA Division II Quarterfinal	
1999	Shepherd	9–2	6–0	1st	L NCAA Division II First Round	15
2000	Shepherd	7–3	5–2	3rd		
2001	Shepherd	8–2	5–2	T–2nd		
2002	Shepherd	7–3	5–2	T–2nd		
2003	Shepherd	4–6	4–3	T–2nd		
2004	Shepherd	7–3	7–0	1st		
2005	Shepherd	11–1	8–0	1st	L NCAA Division II Second Round	20
2006	Shepherd	11–1	7–0	1st	L NCAA Division II Quarterfinal	8
2007	Shepherd	10–2	7–1	1st	L NCAA Division II Quarterfinal	13
2008	Shepherd	5–5	3–5	T–6th		
2009	Shepherd	6–4	5–3	4th		
2010	Shepherd	12–2	7–1	1st	L NCAA Division II Semifinal	7
2011	Shepherd	9–2	6–2	T–2nd		
2012	Shepherd	8–3	7–1	1st	L NCAA Division II First Round	25
Shepherd Rams (Mountain East Conference) (2013–2017)
2013	Shepherd	11–1	9–0	1st	L NCAA Division II Quarterfinal	9
2014	Shepherd	8–2	8–2	2nd		
2015	Shepherd	13–1	10–0	1st	L NCAA Division II Championship	2
2016	Shepherd	13–1	10–0	1st	L NCAA Division II Semifinal	3
2017	Shepherd	10–1	10–0	1st	L NCAA Division II First Round	14
Shepherd:		245–93–1	189–44–1			
Total:		275–117–2				
National championship Conference title Conference division title or championship game berth
^{#}AFCA Division II.

== See also ==
- List of college football career coaching wins leaders
