= Shepherd Rams =

Shepherd University athletic teams

- University: Shepherd University
- Nickname: Rams
- NCAA: Division II
- Conference: Pennsylvania State Athletic Conference
- Athletic director: Carrie Bodkins
- Location: Shepherdstown, West Virginia
- Varsity teams: 14
- Football stadium: Ram Stadium
- Basketball arena: Butcher Center
- Baseball stadium: Fairfax Field
- Soccer stadium: Shepherd Soccer Complex
- Colors: Blue, Gold (Academic), and Gold
- Mascot: J.C. (Retired in 2025, New Ram is yet to be announced) and Rambo (human mascot)
- Fight song: Fight Song Lyrics
- Website: shepherdrams.com
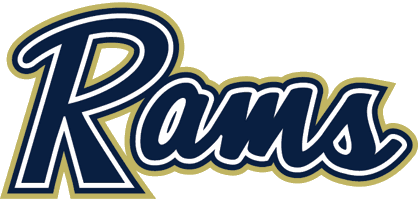

The Shepherd Rams are the athletic teams that represent Shepherd University (formerly Shepherd College), located in Shepherdstown, West Virginia, in Division II intercollegiate sports of the National Collegiate Athletic Association (NCAA). The Rams compete as members of the Pennsylvania State Athletic Conference (PSAC) for all 15 varsity sports since the 2019–20 academic year. They previously competed in the Mountain East Conference (MEC) from 2013–14 to 2018–19, and before that, the now-defunct West Virginia Intercollegiate Athletic Conference (WVIAC) from 1924–25 to 2012–13.

== Varsity teams ==
=== List of teams ===
Men's sports

- Baseball
- Basketball
- Cross country
- Football
- Golf
- Soccer

Women's sports

- Basketball
- Cross country
- Golf
- Lacrosse
- Soccer
- Softball
- Volleyball

== Individual teams ==
=== Baseball ===
The current head coach is Andrew Kowalo. He comes to Shepherd after serving as an assistant coach at Liberty University since 2022. The former head coach, Matt McCarty, announced his resignation on July 1, 2024, to become the head baseball coach at Francis Marion University.

The Rams baseball team has won the WVIAC/MEC championship in 1983, 1984, 2004, 2009, 2012, 2016 and 2017.

=== Football ===
The current head coach is Ernie McCook, a 1992 graduate of Wesley College. McCook was elevated to head coach after the retirement of longtime coach Monte Cater. McCook previously served as offensive line coach at Shepherd from 1999 to 2008 and was also the offensive coordinator starting in 2000. McCook was elevated to assistant head coach in 2007. He spent the 2009 season as running game coordinator/tight ends coach at Liberty University, before returning to Shepherd the next season, where he served as assistant head coach/offensive coordinator for the next seven years.

After the 2021 football season, Junior QB Tyson Bagent won the Harlon Hill Trophy for most outstanding Division II player, the first Shepherd player to win the award.

=== Volleyball ===
The current head coach is Alex Hoekstra, a 2010 graduate of University of Mount Olive.

== Notable Shepherd Athletes ==
=== Baseball ===
Shepherd has had four baseball players drafted by MLB:

- 1B Nathan Minnich, the 2012 Tino Martinez Award winner, was taken in the 8th round of the 2012 MLB draft by the Boston Red Sox. He played for 2 seasons, alternating between the GCL Red Sox of the Gulf Coast League and the Lowell Spinners of the New York–Penn League. Minnich was released by the Red Sox on March 31, 2014.
- RHP Josh McCauley was taken in the 21st round of the 2013 MLB draft by the Chicago Cubs. He did not sign with the Cubs, however.
- OF Jared Carr was taken in the 13th round of the 2021 MLB draft by the Philadelphia Phillies. He now plays for the Hagerstown Flying Boxcars.
- OF Brenton Doyle was taken in the 4th round of the 2019 MLB draft by the Colorado Rockies. He currently plays for the Chicago White Sox.

Other notable Shepherd baseball players:

- LHP Charles "Lefty" Willis played for 21 teams from 1923 to 1938.
- RHP Frank Funk played for 24 teams from 1954 to 1969 and managed 9 teams from 1969 to 1991
- RHP Cecil Perkins played for 12 teams from 1962 to 1968.
- RHP Brian Sands played for the Elmira Pioneers of the Northeast League for 1 season.
- OF Michael Spry played for the River City Rascals, Chillicothe Paints, and Evansville Otters, all of the Frontier League, from 2003 to 2007.
- 3B Nash Hutter played for the Rockford Aviators of the Frontier League for 1 season.
- RHP Charlie Gordon played for the Normal CornBelters of the Frontier League and the Sussex Skyhawks of the Canadian American Association of Professional Baseball.
- LHP Paul Hvozdovic, holder of Shepherd career marks for most wins (34), innings pitched (340), most strikeouts (307), most games started (56), most complete games (19), played for the River City Rascals of the Frontier League.

=== Football ===
Shepherd has had three football players drafted by the NFL:

- QB John Shearer was taken with the 6th pick in the 28th round of the 1956 NFL draft by the Baltimore Colts, and T Bob Hogue was taken with the 11th pick in the 20th round of the 1960 NFL draft, also by the Colts. Neither played in the NFL.
- RB Wayne Wilson was taken with the 21st pick in the 12th round of the 1979 NFL draft by the Houston Oilers. He played for 3 NFL teams from 1979 to 1987.

Other notable Shepherd football players:

- FS Brian Baumgardner signed with the Charleston Swamp Foxes of the now-defunct AF2 in April 2000.
- DB/KR James Rooths played for the New York Jets, Green Bay Packers, Minnesota Vikings, and Tampa Bay Buccaneers. He also played for NFL Europe's Scottish Claymores for 2 seasons. After his playing career, Rooths was an assistant defensive backs coach with the Frankfurt Galaxy. He was an assistant football coach for Wilde Lake High School in 2010 and was part of the Baltimore Ravens strength and conditioning staff in 2013.
- K/P Ricky Schmitt has played for 6 NFL teams and 2 CFL teams.
- TE Dominique Jones has played in the United Football League, the Indoor Football League, and for 8 NFL teams.
- QB Joel Gordon played with Arena Football League 2's Richmond Speed and the Winterthur Warriors of the Swiss Nationalliga A. Gordon led the Warriors the Swiss Bowl in 2006. Gordon was the QB coach at Shepherd in 2003, 2005–07, and 2011–2015. In 2016 Gordon became the OC at Ferrum College.
- DE Ramal Faunteroy played for AFL2's Manchester Wolves. Faunteroy is currently the defensive line coach at Shepherd. On June 12, 2014, Faunteroy was selected to participate in the Bill Walsh NFL Minority Coaching Fellowship.
- DL/LB Robert Hayes signed with the Portland Thunder of the Arena Football League in December 2014. He also played for the Baltimore Brigade.
- LB Louis Corum played for the United Football League's Virginia Destroyers and the Indoor Football League's now defunct Richmond Revolution.
- DE Howard Jones was signed by the Pittsburgh Steelers after the 2014 NFL draft. He also played for the Tampa Bay Buccaneers and the Chicago Bears. He is currently a free agent.
- DE Shaneil Jenkins was signed by the Denver Broncos following the 2016 NFL draft. He currently plays for the Ottawa RedBlacks of the Canadian Football League.
- WR Billy Brown was signed by the Philadelphia Eagles on May 1, 2017.
- S Tre Sullivan was signed by the Philadelphia Eagles on May 1, 2017 and played for 2 years.
- QB Jeff Ziemba was signed by the CAN-AM Indoor Football League's Baltimore Lightning in late 2017. He played 3 years for the Indoor Football League's Arizona Rattlers where he was named IFL Offensive Player Of The Week for Week 5 in 2018. He was also named the IFL's Offensive Rookie Of The Year for 2018.
- LB Elijah Norris signed with the Chicago Bears on April 28, 2018. He was waived on September 1. Norris was hired as Shepherd's defensive line coach on June 27, 2025.
- OG Lavonte Hights attended rookie minicamp with the Chicago Bears in 2018. He then shortly after signed to play with the Salt Lake Stallions of the now defunct Alliance of American Football in which he played the first and only season of the league.
- QB Connor Jessop signed with the Washington Football Team on August 26, 2018. He was waived on September 1. He is currently a free agent.
- CB DeJuan Neal was selected by the New York Guardians of the revived XFL in Phase 5 of the 2020 XFL draft. Two years later, he was drafted 90th overall by the New Jersey Generals in the 2022 USFL draft. On July 14, 2022, he was signed by the Washington Commanders. and was released on August 30 during final roster cuts. He was drafted by the DC Defenders of the XFL on November 16, 2022.
- WR Devin Phelps signed with the Arizona Cardinals on April 26, 2020. He was released on July 27.
- WR Deonte Glover was drafted by the Edmonton Elks in the 3rd round of the 2021 CFL draft.
- OG Joey Fisher was taken in the 3rd round of the 2023 USFL draft by the Houston Gamblers. He chose not to sign with the Gamblers and was instead signed by the San Francisco 49ers after the conclusion of the 2023 NFL draft. He was released on August 29, 2023. He was signed to the Pittsburgh Steelers practice squad the next day. He was released by Pittsburgh on November 14 and signed to the Cleveland Browns practice squad a month later. On January 8, 2025, Fisher signed a futures contract with the Atlanta Falcons.
- QB Tyson Bagent was signed by the Chicago Bears after the conclusion of the 2023 NFL draft. He made his NFL regular season debut on October 22, 2023, against the Las Vegas Raiders.
- RB Ronnie Brown was signed by the Tampa Bay Buccaneers after the conclusion of the 2023 NFL draft. He was released on August 29, 2023. On January 5, 2024, he signed with the Winnipeg Blue Bombers. On May 17, 2024, he signed with the Ottawa Redblacks.He currently plays for the Indoor Football League's Arizona Rattlers.
- TE Brian Walker was signed by the Baltimore Ravens after the conclusion of the 2023 NFL draft. He was waived on June 13, 2023.
- QB Seth Morgan was invited to Pittsburgh Steelers rookie minicamp on April 28, 2025.
