= A. D. Kenamond =

American professor and coach (1883–1970)

Biographical details
- Born: May 16, 1883; West Virginia, U.S.
- Died: December 12, 1970 (aged 87); Shepherdstown, West Virginia, U.S.

Coaching career (HC unless noted)
- 1906–1912: West Liberty
- 1920: Shepherd

Alva Dayne Kenamond (May 16, 1883 – December 12, 1970) was an American university professor, administrator, and college football coach from West Virginia. He served as the dean of Shepherd University from 1924 to 1928, and the head football coach at West Liberty State Normal School (1906–1912) and Shepherd University (1920). Kenamond also served as a West Virginia Court of Claims judge from 1950 to 1954.

== Early years ==
Kenamond was born in 1883. He grew up in Short Creek, West Virginia, and in June 1900, he graduated from West Liberty State Normal School at age 17. He went on to serve for five years as the first assistant at West Liberty. He also served as West Liberty's athletic director and football coach from approximately 1906 to 1912.

== Shepherd College ==
In September 1912, Kenamond moved to Shepherdstown, West Virginia, where he became a science instructor at Shepherd College—now known as Shepherd University. He became assistant to the school's president in 1919. He also served as the school's football coach in 1920, compiling a 0–1–1 record.

Kenamond served as assistant to the president until 1924 when the title of his position was changed to dean. He retired as dean in 1948 after 24 years in that position. In his 36 years on the faculty, Kenamond served as both an instructor and administrator. He reportedly "taught in almost every department of the college."

== Later years ==
After retiring from the faculty at Shepherd College, Kenamond served as the presiding judge of the West Virginia Court of Claims from 1950 to 1953. He also served three terms on the Shepherdstown Town Council, seven years as president of the Shepherdstown Fire Department, and as president of the Jefferson County Historical Society from 1927 to 1950 and 1954 to 1960. In 1963, he published his work, "Prominent Men of Shepherdstown During Its First 200 Years."

In 1966, a new three-story dormitory at Shepherd College was named Kenamond Hall in his honor.

== Personal life ==
In August 1910, Kenamond married Alice Gertrude Gotshall (1883–1970) in Huntington, West Virginia. They had a son, James Gotshall Kenamond, who died at age 37 in 1950.
