= William M. Moore =

- Moore pictured in The Dial 1954, Central Connecticut yearbook

Biographical details
- Born: May 19, 1926; Cleveland, Tennessee, U.S.
- Died: December 22, 2013 (aged 87); Farmington, Connecticut, U.S.

Coaching career (HC unless noted)

Football
- 1951–1952: Shepherd
- 1959–1961: Central Connecticut

Basketball
- 1951–1953: Shepherd
- 1953–1959: Central Connecticut

Administrative career (AD unless noted)
- 1951–1953: Shepherd
- 1962–1982: Central Connecticut
- 1983–1993: Albany
- 1994–?: NECC (commissioner)
- ?–2008: LEC (commissioner)

Head coaching record
- Overall: 17–23–2 (football); 92–70 (basketball)

William Milton Moore (May 19, 1926 – December 22, 2013) was an American football coach, basketball coach, and college athletics administrator. He served as the head football coach at Shepherd College from 1951 to 1952 and at Central Connecticut State University from 1959 to 1961, compiling a career college football record of 17–23–2. Moore was also the head basketball coach at Shepherd from 1951 to 1953 and at Central Connecticut State from 1953 to 1959, tallying a career college basketball mark of 92–70. He was inducted into the National Association of Collegiate Directors of Athletics Hall of Fame in 2008.

Moore graduated from Bradley Central High School in Cleveland, Tennessee in 1944. He earned a Bachelor of Science in health and physical education from Tennessee Technological University in 1944, a Master of Science in physical education from the University of Tennessee in 1949, and a Ph.D. in physical education from the University of Michigan in 1954. Moore died on December 22, 2013, at the age of 87.

== Head coaching record ==
=== Football ===
Year	Team	Overall	Conference	Standing	Bowl/playoffs
Shepherd Rams (West Virginia Intercollegiate Athletic Conference) (1951–1952)
1951	Shepherd	3–5	1–3	8th	
1952	Shepherd	5–3–1	1–1	NA	
Shepherd:		8–8–1	2–4		
Central Connecticut Blue Devils (Independent) (1959–1961)
1959	Central Connecticut	2–4–1			
1960	Central Connecticut	4–5			
1961	Central Connecticut	3–6			
Central Connecticut:		9–15–1			
Total:		17–23–2			
