= Lowry Stoops =

Biographical details
- Born: 1892; Tustin, California, U.S.
- Died: May 14, 1969; Morgantown, West Virginia, U.S.

Playing career

Baseball
- 1916–1918: West Virginia
- Position(s): Right fielder

Coaching career (HC unless noted)

Football
- 1923–1924: West Liberty

Basketball
- 1923–1926: West Liberty

Administrative career (AD unless noted)
- 1926–1962: West Virginia (assistant AD)

Head coaching record
- Overall: 5–10–2 (football); 10–11 (basketball)

Lowry McElvain "Larry" Stoops (1892 – May 14, 1969) was an American college football and college basketball coach and an athletic administrator. He spent two seasons as the head football coach at West Liberty University where he compiled a 5–10–2 from 1924 to 1925. He also served as the head basketball coach at West Liberty for the 1923–1924 and 1925–1926 seasons where he accumulated a 10–11 record.

Beginning in 1926, he served as the assistant athletic director at West Virginia University until his retirement in 1962.

== Head coaching record ==
=== Football ===
Year	Team	Overall	Conference	Standing	Bowl/playoffs
West Liberty Hilltoppers (Independent) (1924)
1924	West Liberty	4–4–2			
West Liberty Hilltoppers (West Virginia Intercollegiate Athletic Conference) (1925)
1925	West Liberty	1–6–1	1–3	9th	
West Liberty:		5–10–2	1–3		
Total:		5–10–2			
