= Billy Brown (tight end) =

American football player (born 1993)

No. 48, 85
- Position: Tight end

Personal information
- Born: March 20, 1993 (age 33); Gaithersburg, Maryland
- Listed height: 6 ft 4 in (1.93 m)
- Listed weight: 241 lb (109 kg)

Career information
- High school: Gaithersburg (Gaithersburg, Maryland)
- College: Shepherd
- NFL draft: 2017: undrafted

Career history
- Philadelphia Eagles (2017–2018)*; Indianapolis Colts (2018–2019)
- * Offseason or practice squad member only

Awards and highlights
- Super Bowl champion (LII); First-team All-MEC (2016)
- Stats at Pro Football Reference

Billy Brown (born March 20, 1993) is an American former football tight end. He played college football at Shepherd.

== Professional career ==
Pre-draft measurables
Height	Weight	Arm length	Hand span	40-yard dash	Vertical jump	Broad jump
6 ft 4 in (1.93 m)	255 lb (116 kg)	33 in (0.84 m)	10 3/8 in (0.26 m)	4.7 s	29 in (0.74 m)	118 in (3.00 m)

Brown was seen as a late seventh round draft pick in the 2017 NFL draft. ESPN.com had Brown going in the seventh round, other sports sites also had him listed as a later draft or undrafted prospect coming out of Shepherd University, and signed with the Philadelphia Eagles as an undrafted free agent in 2017.

=== Philadelphia Eagles ===
Brown signed with the Philadelphia Eagles as an undrafted free agent on May 11, 2017. He was waived on September 2, 2017 and was signed to the Eagles' practice squad the next day. While Brown was on their practice squad, the Eagles defeated the New England Patriots in Super Bowl LII. He signed a futures contract with the Eagles on February 9, 2018.

On September 1, 2018, Brown was waived by the Eagles and was signed to the practice squad the next day. He was released on September 10, 2018, but was re-signed on September 20. He was released on November 13, 2018.

=== Indianapolis Colts ===
On December 6, 2018, Brown was signed to the Indianapolis Colts practice squad. He signed a future/reserve contract on January 13, 2019.

On August 3, 2019, Brown was waived/injured by the Colts and was placed on injured reserve. He was waived on April 27, 2020.
