= Harrison J. Kaiser =

American football, basketball and baseball coach

- Kaiser pictured in The Dial 1947, Central Connecticut yearbook

Biographical details
- Born: August 15, 1899; Wells, Minnesota, U.S.
- Died: February 23, 1974 (aged 74); Clearwater, Florida, U.S.

Coaching career (HC unless noted)

Football
- 1931–1933: Lock Haven
- 1935–1947: Connecticut Teachers

Basketball
- 1931–1933: Lock Haven
- 1935–1947: Connecticut Teachers

Baseball
- 1935–1941: Connecticut Teachers

Administrative career (AD unless noted)
- 1935–1962: Connecticut Teachers / Central Connecticut

Head coaching record
- Overall: 49–20–8 (football); 106–76 (basketball); 36–11 (baseball)

Harrison Jean "Jim" Kaiser (August 15, 1899 – February 23, 1974) was an American football, basketball, and baseball coach and college athletics administrator. He served as the head football coach at State Teachers College in Lock Haven—now known as Lock Haven University of Pennsylvania—from 1931 to 1933 and at the Teachers College of Connecticut—now known as Central Connecticut State University—from 1935 to 1947, compiling career college football coaching record of 49–20–8.

== Early life and playing career ==
A native of Wells, Minnesota, Kaiser attended North Central College in Naperville, Illinois, where he won 13 varsity letters, in football, basketball, baseball, and track.

== Coaching career ==
=== Lock Haven ===
Kaiser was the head football coach at State Teachers College in Lock Haven—now known as Lock Haven University of Pennsylvania—from 1931 to 1933. His 1933 team outscored opponents by a total of 240 to 22 and achieved seven shutouts.

=== Central Connecticut ===
Kaiser was the first head coach at the Teachers College of Connecticut—now known as Central Connecticut State University—in New Britain, Connecticut, serving from 1935 to 1947. Central Connecticut did not field a football team from 1942 to 1945 due to World War II.

== Head coaching record ==
=== Football ===
Year	Team	Overall	Conference	Standing	Bowl/playoffs
Lock Haven Bald Eagles (Independent) (1931–1933)
1931	Lock Haven	7–0–2			
1932	Lock Haven	4–2–1			
1933	Lock Haven	7–1			
Lock Haven:		18–3–3			
Connecticut Teachers Blue Devils (Independent) (1935–1947)
1935	Connecticut Teachers	1–2–1			
1936	Connecticut Teachers	1–4–1			
1937	Connecticut Teachers	2–4			
1938	Connecticut Teachers	3–3			
1939	Connecticut Teachers	6–0			
1940	Connecticut Teachers	5–1			
1941	Connecticut Teachers	4–1			
1942	No team—World War II				
1943	No team—World War II				
1944	No team—World War II				
1945	No team—World War II				
1946	Connecticut Teachers	4–1–1			
1947	Connecticut Teachers	5–1–2			
Connecticut Teachers:		31–17–5			
Total:		49–20–8			
