= Bill Detrick =

American basketball and golf coach (1927–2014)

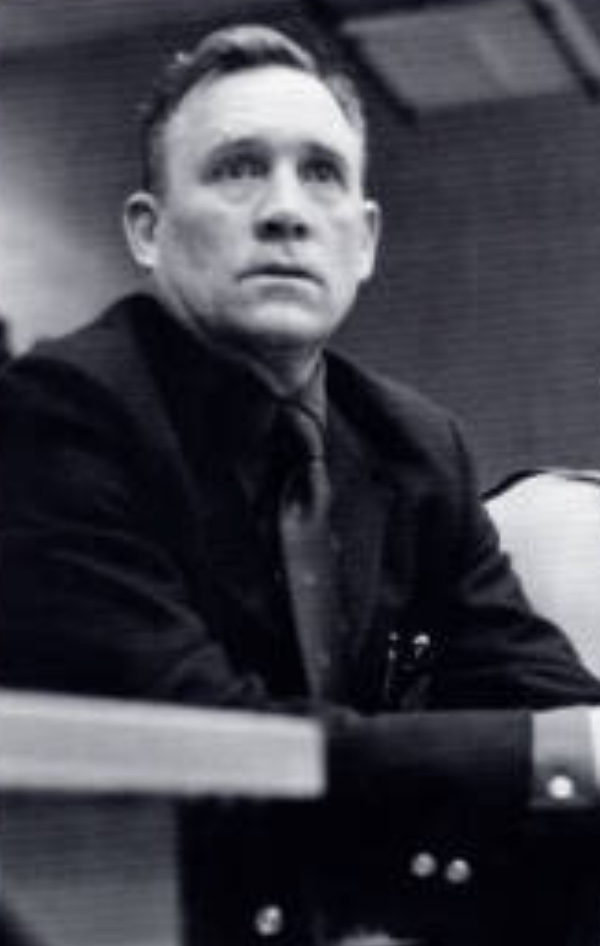
- Detrick from the 1973 Dial

Biographical details
- Born: July 22, 1927; Newark, New Jersey, U.S.
- Died: September 19, 2014 (aged 87); New Britain, Connecticut, U.S.

Playing career
- 1946–1950: Central Connecticut

Coaching career (HC unless noted)
- 1959–1987: Central Connecticut
- 1988–1989: Coast Guard

William H. Detrick (July 22, 1927 – September 19, 2014) was an American college basketball and golf coach. He was most notable as head men's basketball coach at Central Connecticut State University (CCSU), where he served for 29 seasons and won a school-record 468 games.

Detrick was a three-sport athlete in baseball, football, and basketball at Central Connecticut, becoming the first student in school history to earn 12 varsity letters. He returned to CCSU in 1959, as head coach where he remained until 1987. After a short stint as head coach at the United States Coast Guard Academy, Detrick went on to become head golf coach at Trinity College in Connecticut, where he remained for 23 years and was a three-time conference coach of the year.

Detrick was an inaugural member of the Central Connecticut athletic Hall of Fame and was the namesake for the school's basketball arena, the William H. Detrick Gymnasium. At Trinity, the school honored Detrick in 2013 be renaming its annual golf tournament the Bill Detrick Invitational.

Detrick died on September 19, 2014, at the age of 87.
