= Howard Jones (linebacker) =

American football player (born 1990)

No. 95, 57
- Position: Linebacker

Personal information
- Born: February 10, 1990 (age 36); Woodbridge, Virginia, U.S.
- Listed height: 6 ft 4 in (1.93 m)
- Listed weight: 247 lb (112 kg)

Career information
- High school: Freedom (Woodbridge)
- College: Shepherd (WV)
- NFL draft: 2014: undrafted

Career history
- Pittsburgh Steelers (2014–2015)*; Tampa Bay Buccaneers (2015–2016); Chicago Bears (2017)
- * Offseason or practice squad member only

Career NFL statistics
- Total tackles: 20
- Sacks: 6
- Forced fumbles: 1
- Fumble recoveries: 2
- Defensive touchdowns: 1
- Stats at Pro Football Reference

Howard Jones (born February 10, 1990) is an American former professional football player who was a linebacker in the National Football League (NFL). He played college football for the Shepherd Rams.

== Professional career ==
=== Pittsburgh Steelers ===
Jones signed with the Steelers as an undrafted rookie free agent on May 10, 2014. He was released on September 5, 2015.

=== Tampa Bay Buccaneers ===
Jones was signed to the Tampa Bay Buccaneers practice squad on September 7, 2015. He was elevated to the team's main roster on October 6. During his first game against the Jacksonville Jaguars the following Sunday, he recorded 2 solo sacks. Two weeks later, against the Washington Redskins, he added a 43-yard fumble return touchdown. In Week 8 against the Atlanta Falcons, Jones recorded another sack which resulted in a fumble. Jones finished his first season with the Buccaneers with five sacks.

Jones was placed on injured reserve on November 7, 2016 after suffering a knee injury.

=== Chicago Bears ===
On October 6, 2017, Jones was signed to the Chicago Bears' practice squad. He was promoted to the active roster on November 23, 2017. On November 30, 2017, he was waived by the Bears and re-signed to the practice squad. He was promoted back to the active roster on December 5, 2017.

On May 14, 2018, Jones was released by the Bears.
