= Ernie McCook =

American football coach

Current position
- Title: Head coach
- Team: Shepherd
- Conference: PSAC
- Record: 66–22

Biographical details
- Born: Hagerstown, Maryland, U.S.
- Education: Wesley College (1992); US Sports Academy (1999)

Playing career
- 1988–1991: Wesley (DE)
- Position: Offensive lineman

Coaching career (HC unless noted)
- ?: Beall HS (MD) (assistant)
- ?–1990: South River HS (MD) (assistant)
- 1991: Susquehanna (assistant)
- 1992–1997: Wesley (DE) (assistant)
- 1998: Frostburg State (assistant)
- 1999: Shepherd (OL)
- 2000–2006: Shepherd (OC/OL)
- 2007–2008: Shepherd (AHC/OC/OL)
- 2009: Liberty (TE)
- 2010–2017: Shepherd (AHC/OC/OL)
- 2018–present: Shepherd

Head coaching record
- Overall: 66–22
- Tournaments: 7–4 (NCAA D-II playoffs)

Accomplishments and honors

Championships
- 1 PSAC East Division (2022); 2 Super Region 1 (2021–2022)

Awards
- AFCA Region 1 Coach of the Year (2022); PSAC East Division Coach of the Year (2022)

Ernie McCook is an American college football coach. He is the head football coach for Shepherd University, a position he has held since 2018. He previously coached for Beall High School, South River High School, Susquehanna, Wesley, Frostburg State, and Liberty. He played college football for Wesley as an offensive lineman.

== Head coaching record ==
Year	Team	Overall	Conference	Standing	Bowl/playoffs	AFCA^{#}
Shepherd Rams (Mountain East Conference) (2018)
2018	Shepherd	7–3	7–3	3rd		
Shepherd Rams (Pennsylvania State Athletic Conference) (2019–present)
2019	Shepherd	10–3	6–1	2nd (East)	L NCAA Division II Second Round	22
2020–21	Shepherd	1–0	0–0	N/A		
2021	Shepherd	13–2	6–1	2nd (East)	L NCAA Division II Semifinal	5
2022	Shepherd	13–2	7–0	1st (East)	L NCAA Division II Semifinal	6
2023	Shepherd	9–3	5–2	T–2nd (East)	L NCAA Division II First Round	
2024	Shepherd	6–5	3–4	T–5th (East)		
2025	Shepherd	7–4	6–1	2nd (East)		
Shepherd:		66–22	40–12			
Total:		66–22				
National championship Conference title Conference division title or championship game berth
