= Ram Stadium =

Sports stadium

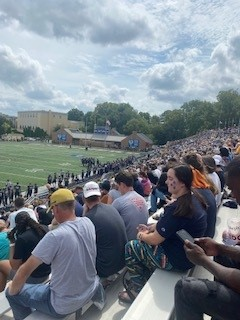
- Ram Stadium in 2022
- Interactive map of Ram Stadium
- Location: 123 E Campus Dr; Shepherdstown, WV 25443
- Coordinates: 39.434111°N 77.805884°W
- Owner: Shepherd University
- Operator: Shepherd University
- Capacity: 5,000
- Surface: Field turf
- Record attendance: 7,017; Dec. 10, 2016 vs #12 North Alabama

Construction
- Built: 1959
- Opened: 1959
- Expanded: 2000
- Cost: $2.2 million (renovation)

Tenant
- Shepherd Rams (NCAA) 1959-present

Website
- https://shepherdrams.com/sports/2018/7/30/facilities.aspx

Ram Stadium is a 5,000-seat stadium in Shepherdstown, West Virginia. It is home to the Shepherd University Rams football and lacrosse teams.

The stadium was built in 1959 and renovated several times, most recently in 2000.
