= Shippensburg Raiders =

- University: Shippensburg University of Pennsylvania
- Conference: Pennsylvania State Athletic Conference (PSAC)
- NCAA: Division II
- Athletic director: Jeff Michaels
- Location: Shippensburg, Pennsylvania
- Football stadium: Seth Grove Stadium
- Basketball arena: Heiges Field House
- Baseball stadium: Fairchild Field
- Soccer stadium: Robb Sports Complex
- Nickname: Raiders
- Colors: Blue and red
- Website: shipraiders.com
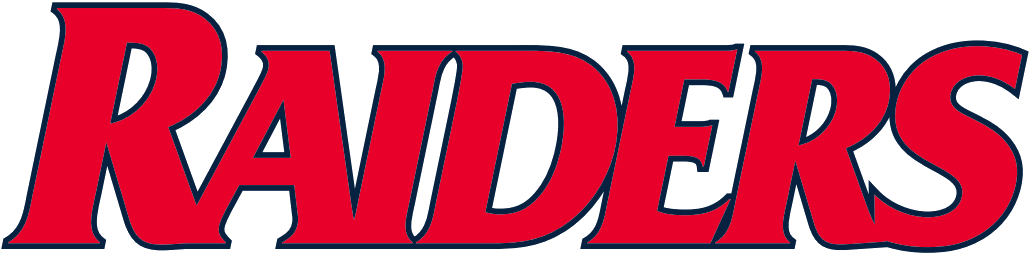

The Shippensburg Raiders are the athletic teams that represent Shippensburg University of Pennsylvania, located in Shippensburg, Pennsylvania, in NCAA Division II intercollegiate sports.

The Raiders are members of the Pennsylvania State Athletic Conference (PSAC) for all varsity sports. Shippensburg have been members of the PSAC since its foundation in 1951.

== History ==
Shippensburg University has won several regional and national athletic championships. The Dixon trophy is awarded to the top athletic program in the 18 university Pennsylvania State Athletic Conference. Shippensburg has won the trophy seven times, the most by any PSAC member. Their titles came in 1998, 1999, 2003, 2004, 2005, 2010, and 2011. SU has finished either first or second in the Dixon Trophy standings 15 times in 21 years. The women's rugby club won intercollegiate Division II national titles in 2008 and 2009. The 2011–2012 Men's rugby club were the Men's College Division I-AA Keystone Rugby Conference Champions.

== Varsity teams ==
Men's sports	Women's sports
Baseball	Basketball
Basketball	Cross country
Cross country	Field hockey
Football	Lacrosse
Soccer	Soccer
Swimming	Softball
Track and field	Swimming
Wrestling	Tennis
	Track and field
	Volleyball

== National championships ==
=== Team ===
Association	Division	Sport	Year	Runner-up	Score
Field hockey (6)	NCAA	Division II	2013	LIU Post	2–1 (OT)
Field hockey (6)	NCAA	Division II	2016	LIU Post	2–1
Field hockey (6)	NCAA	Division II	2017	LIU Post	4–1
Field hockey (6)	NCAA	Division II	2018	East Stroudsburg	2–1
Field hockey (6)	NCAA	Division II	2021	West Chester	3–0
Field hockey (6)	NCAA	Division II	2025	Newberry	3–2 (OT)

== Individual sports ==
=== Field hockey ===
In 2013, the women's field hockey team, under the direction of coach Bertie Landes, captured the university's first ever NCAA team championship. SU duplicated the feat in 2016, with Landes winning her final collegiate game with the Raiders.
