= Concord Mountain Lions =

- University: Concord University
- Nickname: Mountain Lions
- NCAA: Division II
- Conference: Mountain East Conference
- Athletic director: Luke Duffy
- Location: Athens, West Virginia
- Varsity teams: 15
- Football stadium: Callaghan Stadium
- Basketball arena: Carter Center
- Baseball stadium: Anderson Field
- Soccer stadium: Anderson Field; Paul Cline Sports Complex
- Colors: Maroon and Gray
- Website: cumountainlions.com
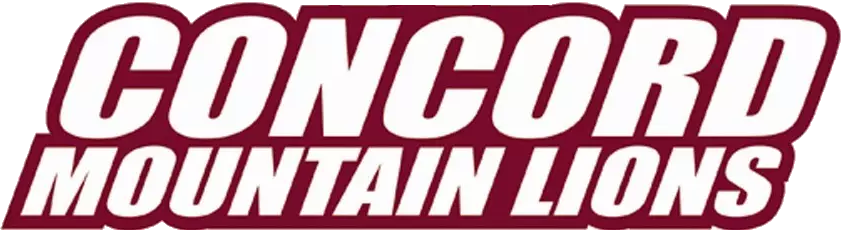

The Concord Mountain Lions are the athletic teams that represent Concord University, located in Athens, West Virginia, in NCAA Division II intercollegiate sports. The Mountain Lions compete as members of the Mountain East Conference in all fifteen sports.

== Sports sponsored ==
Men's sports	Women's sports
Baseball	Basketball
Basketball	Cross country
Cross country	Golf
Football	Soccer
Golf	Softball
Soccer	Track and field
Track and field	Volleyball
	Wrestling (2026–27)

== Individual programs ==
=== Football ===
On November 29, 2014, the football team won its first-ever playoff game by beating West Chester University 51–36. This was also its first 12–0 season. The following week they beat Bloomsburg University 32–26 to advance to the semifinals. On December 13, 2014, in the semifinals game in Mankato, Minnesota, Concord lost to Minnesota State University, Mankato 47–13, ending the season with a record of 13–1, their best ever.
