= West Liberty Hilltoppers =

Athletics program of West Liberty University, West Virginia, US

- University: West Liberty University
- Conference: MEC
- NCAA: Division II
- Athletic director: Brad Forshey
- Location: West Liberty, West Virginia
- Varsity teams: 18
- Football stadium: West Family Stadium
- Basketball arena: Academic, Sports, and Recreation Complex (ASRC)
- Baseball stadium: Kovalick Field
- Soccer stadium: West Family Athletic Complex
- Nickname: Hilltoppers
- Colors: Black and gold
- Website: hilltoppersports.com

The West Liberty Hilltoppers, also previously known as the West Liberty State Hilltoppers, are the athletic teams that represent West Liberty University, located in West Liberty, West Virginia, in NCAA Division II intercollegiate sports. The Hilltoppers compete as members of the Mountain East Conference for all sports.

Prior to 2012, West Liberty was a member of the West Virginia Intercollegiate Athletic Conference, of which the Hilltoppers were an original founding member from 1924.

== Varsity teams ==
Men's sports	Women's sports
Baseball	Acrobatics
Basketball	Basketball
Cross Country	Cross country
Football	Golf
Golf	Soccer
Soccer	Softball
Tennis	Tennis
Track and field	Track and field
Wrestling	Volleyball

== National championships ==
=== Team ===
Sport	Association	Division	Year	Runner-up	Score
Baseball (1)	NAIA (1)	Single (1)	1964	Grambling State	3-2
