= West Virginia Wesleyan Bobcats =

- University: West Virginia Wesleyan College
- Nickname: Bobcats
- NCAA: Division II
- Conference: Mountain East
- Athletic director: Kyle Hoffman
- Location: Buckhannon, West Virginia
- Varsity teams: 21
- Football stadium: Cebe Ross Field
- Basketball arena: Rockefeller Center
- Baseball stadium: Hank Ellis Field
- Softball stadium: Culpepper Field
- Colors: Orange and black
- Website: wesleyanbobcats.com

The West Virginia Wesleyan Bobcats and Lady Bobcats are the athletic teams that represent West Virginia Wesleyan College, located in Buckhannon, West Virginia, in NCAA Division II intercollegiate sports. The Bobcats compete as members of the Mountain East Conference for all twenty-one varsity sports.

== Varsity teams ==
Men's sports	Women's sports
Baseball	Acrobatics and tumbling
Basketball	Basketball
Cross country	Competitive Dance
Football	Cross country
Golf	Golf
Soccer	Lacrosse
Swimming	Soccer
Tennis	Softball
Track and field	Swimming
	Tennis
	Track and field
	Volleyball

== Individual sports ==
=== Football ===
One of the earliest sporting traditions at Wesleyan was football, which was introduced in the pre-college seminary in 1898. The school colors of orange and black go back to that very first game, when fullback and team captain Frank Thompson wore a turtleneck sweater in Princeton University's orange and black to honor two football greats of that university whom he especially admired. A more comprehensive athletic program was formally organized at the collegiate level in 1902. Early sports included football, baseball, basketball, and gymnastics, all for men only.

Many WVWC alumni have gone on to play professional sports. Among them, two alumni have been inducted into the Pro Football Hall of Fame - Earl "Greasy" Neale '15 of the Philadelphia Eagles in 1969 and Cliff Battles '33 of the Washington Redskins in 1968.

== National championships ==
=== Team ===
Assoc.	Division	Sport	Year	Rival	Score
Men's soccer (5)	NAIA	Single	1984	Fresno Pacific	3–2 (OT)
Men's soccer (5)	NAIA	Single	1985	Fresno Pacific	4–3 (OT)
Men's soccer (5)	NAIA	Single	1989	Boca Raton	1–0
Men's soccer (5)	NAIA	Single	1990	Boca Raton	3–1
Men's soccer (5)	NAIA	Single	1994	Mobile	4–2
