= Shepherd University =

Public university in Shepherdstown, West Virginia, US

Coordinates: 39°26′11″N 77°48′30″W

- Former name: Shepherd College (1871–2004)
- Motto: Ne plus ultra (Latin) (inscripted on the Pillars of Hercules)
- Motto in English: "Not further beyond"
- Type: Public university
- Established: September 2, 1871; 155 years ago
- Accreditation: HLC
- Academic affiliations: WVHEPC
- Endowment: $35.759 million (2023)
- President: Mary J.C. Hendrix
- Undergraduates: 2,757 (fall 2023)
- Postgraduates: 512 (fall 2023)
- Location: Shepherdstown, West Virginia, United States
- Campus: 323 acres (1.31 km^{2}); Fringe town
- Newspaper: Picket
- Colors: Blue and gold
- Nickname: Rams
- Sporting affiliations: NCAA Division II – PSAC
- Mascot: JC the Ram
- Website: shepherd.edu
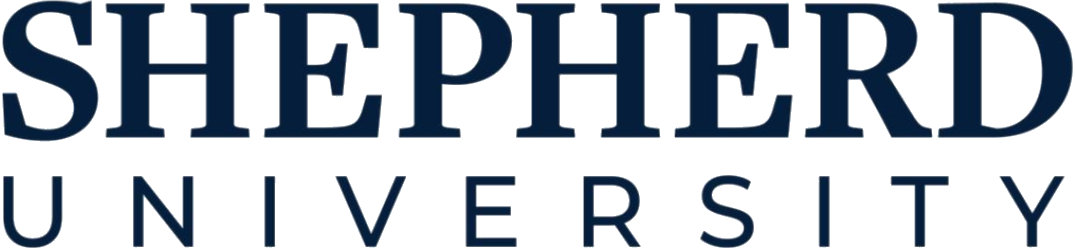

Shepherd University is a public university in Shepherdstown, West Virginia, United States. It is accredited by the Higher Learning Commission. In the fall of 2023, the university enrolled 3,274 students.

== History ==
Shepherd University began when the county seat of Jefferson County, West Virginia, was moved from its temporary location in Shepherdstown back to Charles Town in July 1871. The people of Shepherdstown and vicinity decided to use the vacated courthouse for educational purposes. An article of incorporation for a school to be known as Shepherd College, designed to instruct students "in languages, arts and sciences," was drawn up and signed by C. W. Andrews, Alexander R. Boteler, C. T. Butler, G. M. Beltzhoover, David Billmyer, Samuel Knott, and Henry Shepherd. This body of incorporators gave itself the power to elect instructors, pay salaries, and prescribe courses of study. Professor Joseph McMurran was appointed the first principal of the institution, which opened with 42 students in September 1871, under the authority of the board of trustees.

On February 27, 1872, the Legislature of West Virginia passed the following act: "That a branch of the State Normal School be and it is hereby established at the building known as Shepherd College, in Shepherdstown, in Jefferson County."

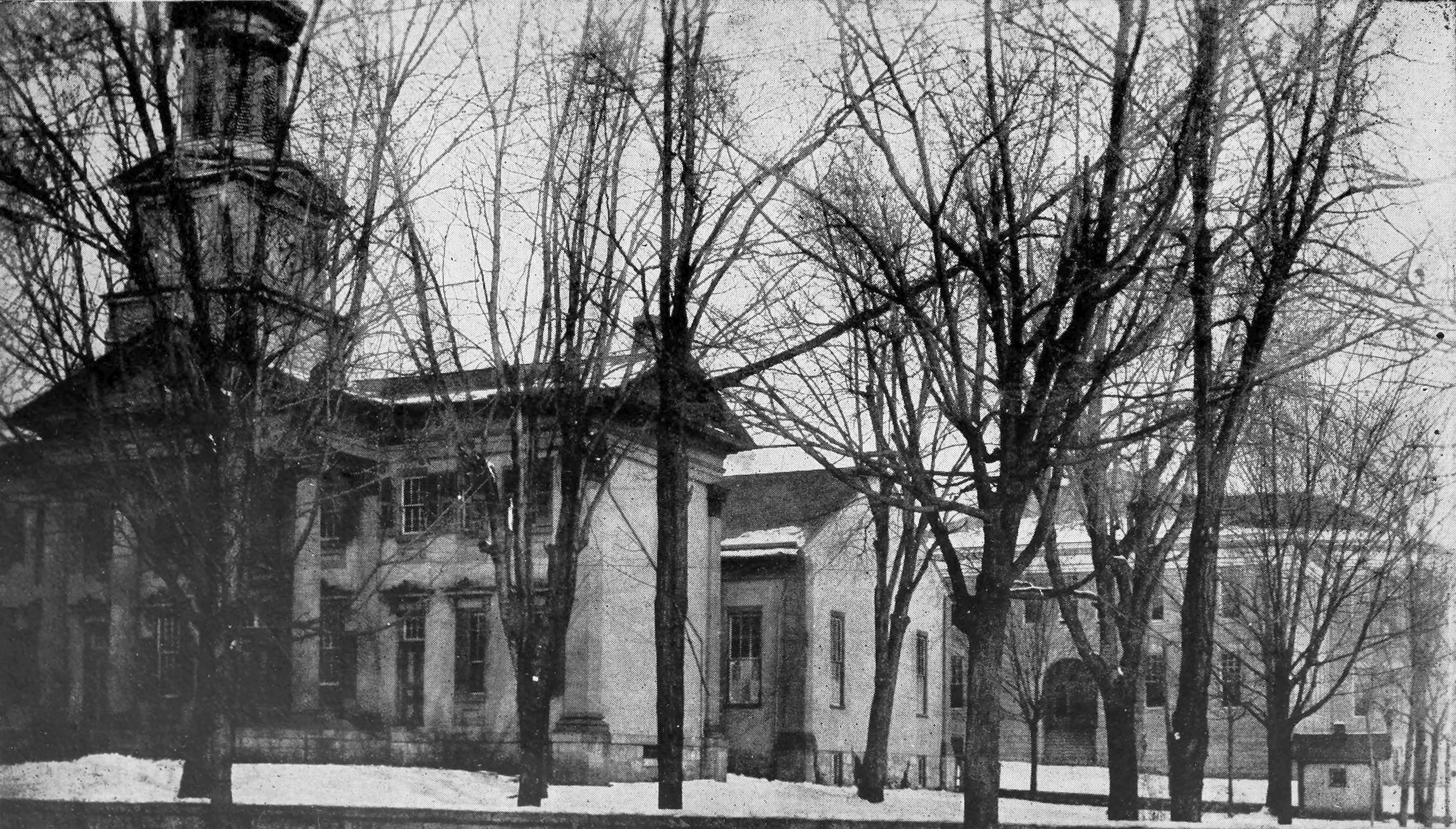
Old college building and rear view of new building, 1918

Shepherd became a four-year college for the training of teachers on July 1, 1930, at which time the institution began granting the bachelor of arts degree. Shepherd was authorized to implement liberal arts programs in 1943, and in 1950 the Bachelor of Science degree was added. Also in 1950 Shepherd was accredited by the North Central Association of Colleges and Schools and in 1951 it became a member of the Association of American Colleges. On April 7, 2004, Governor Bob Wise signed legislation allowing Shepherd College to change its name to Shepherd University.

In the past two decades, Shepherd has added 11 new buildings, including the $9 million Robert C. Byrd Science and Technology Center; the $18 million addition to the Scarborough Library, which also houses the Robert C. Byrd Center for Congressional History and Education; and the $10 million nursing classroom building. The $21.6 million Wellness Center opened on June 11, 2009, and includes a 25-yard, eight-lane pool; two basketball courts, and six basketball hoops; two racquetball courts; an indoor elevated 1/10-mile jogging track; two multi-purpose rooms with mirrored walls for group exercise classes; a 7,500+ square foot weight and fitness area; and a dining venue operated by Shepherd's Dining Services.

Potomac Place, a 298-bed dormitory on the West Campus, opened in August 2017.

Mary J. C. Hendrix was inaugurated as the university's sixteenth president of Shepherd University on April 8, 2016.

== Campus ==
Undergraduate demographics as of Fall 2023
Race and ethnicity	Total
White	72%
Black	8%
Hispanic	8%
Two or more races	6%
Asian	2%
Unknown	2%
International student	1%
Economic diversity
Low-income (Note: The percentage of students who received an income-based federal Pell grant intended for low-income students.)	33%
Affluent (Note: The percentage of students who are a part of the American middle class at the bare minimum.)	67%

=== Ruth Scarborough Library ===
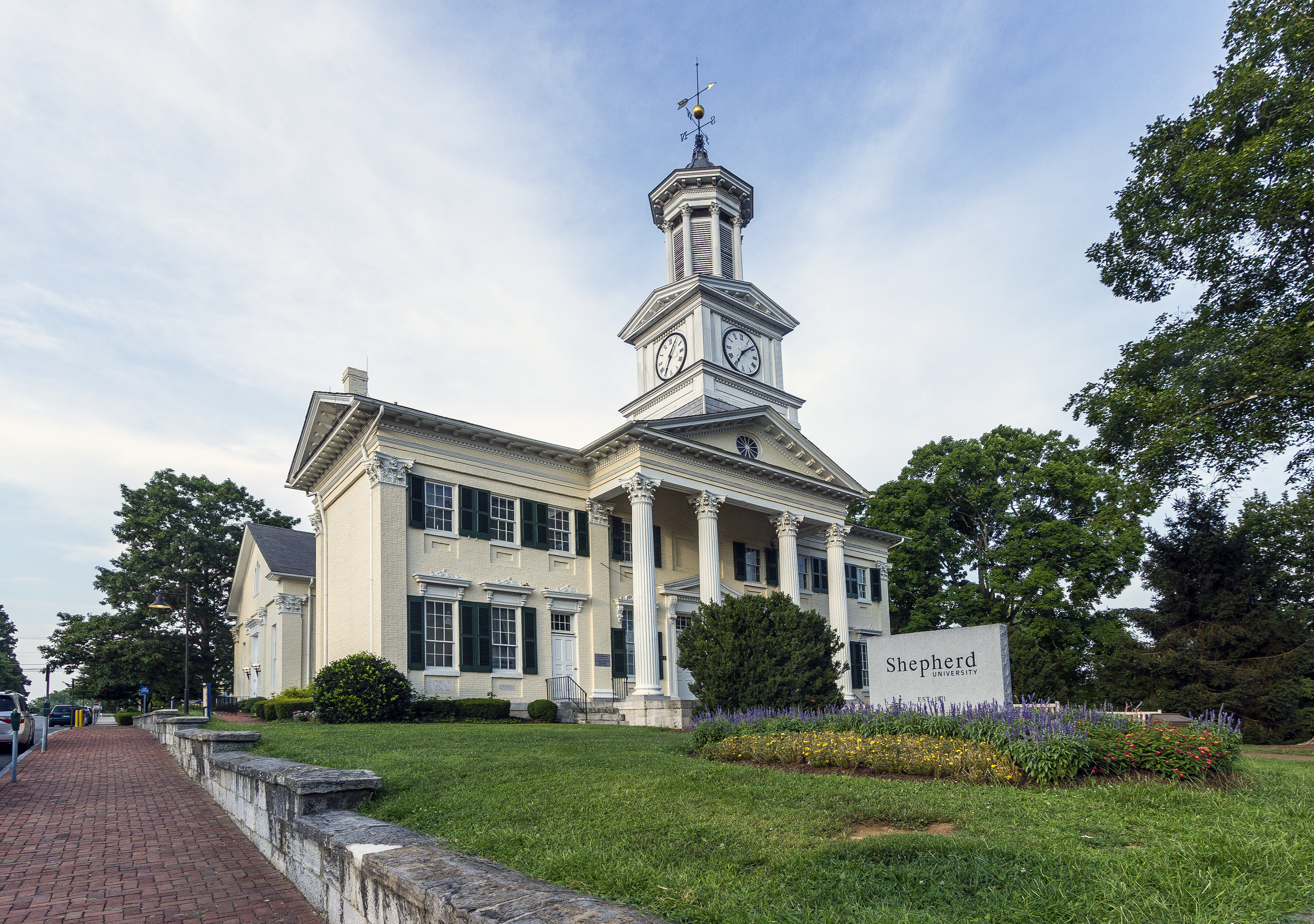
McMurran Hall

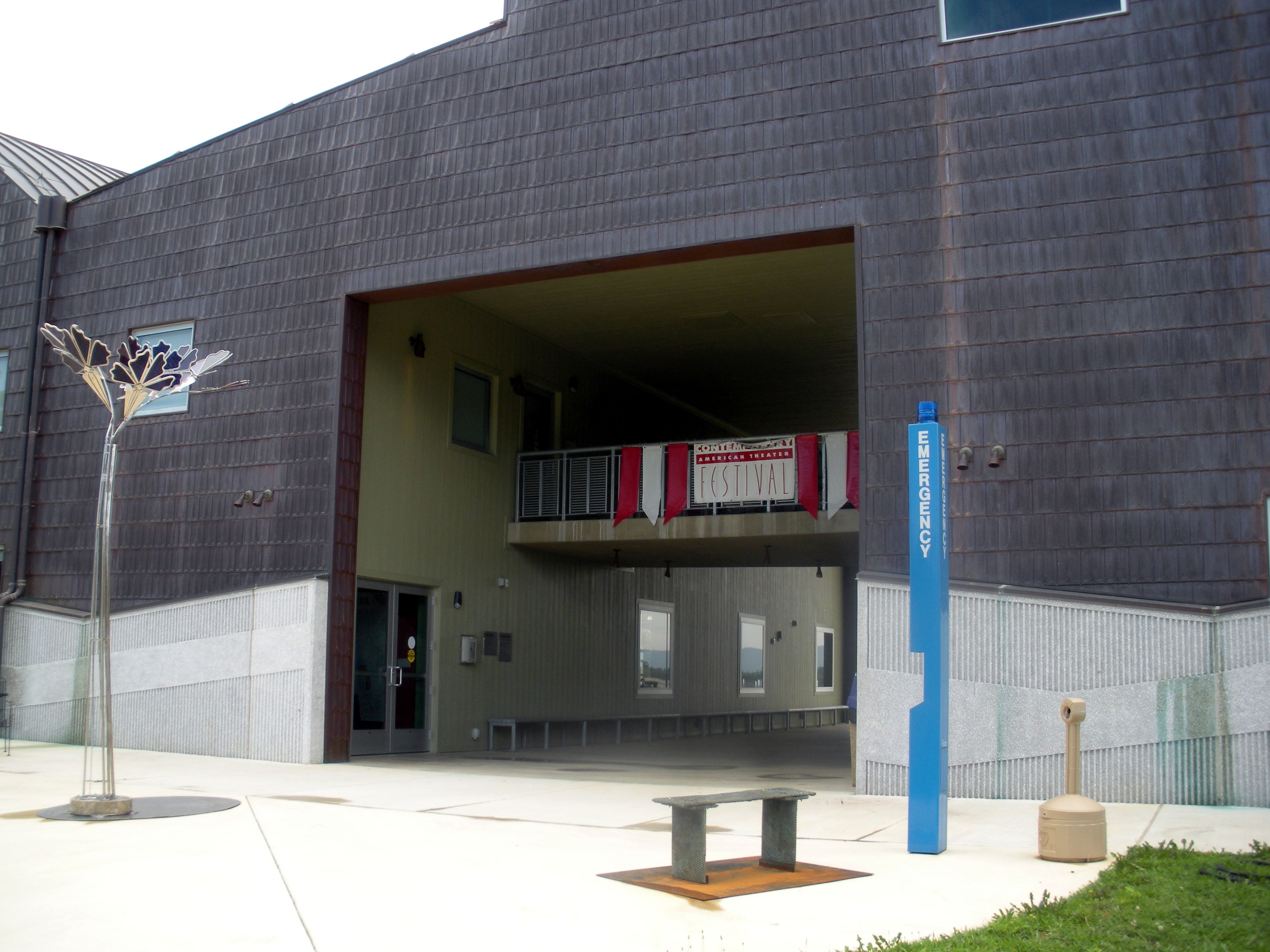
Contemporary Arts Center entrance Phase I

Since 1971, the Ruth Scarborough Library has been a selective repository for federal government publications and regularly receives West Virginia state government publications. The library houses a special collection of printed materials relating to state and regional history. The library's computerized catalog provides Web access to materials in the Scarborough collection, and the library maintains a Web site.

The Scarborough Library, originally built in 1965, was renovated in 2002–03. The library is a place of study and research for individuals and groups. The 46,000-square-foot (4,300 m^{2}) expansion, dedicated in 2002, includes multimedia classrooms, additional reading areas and seating, and the Robert C. Byrd Center for Congressional History and Education whose purpose is to promote an understanding of the United States Congress and the Constitution through public programing, teacher training. The Byrd Center houses an archive containing the political papers of West Virginia's Senator Robert C. Byrd, Congressman Harley O. Staggers Sr., and Congressman Harley O. Staggers Jr., along with other related collections.

=== Contemporary American Theater Festival ===
The Contemporary American Theater Festival is an annual festival of new plays by American playwrights, most often premieres or second or third productions. CATF focuses on plays that deal with contemporary issues that boldly challenge and entertain audiences.

Since 1991, CATF has produced 127 plays written by 90 playwrights, including 52 world premieres, 11 of which were commissioned. Adventurous audiences from 38 states, the District of Columbia, Canada, and Europe have attended the Theater Festival's productions. The plays are professionally produced using Actors' Equity Association's LORT D contract; CATF operates under agreements from AEA, United Scenic Artists, and the Society of Stage Directors and Choreographers.

=== George Tyler Moore Center for the Study of the Civil War ===
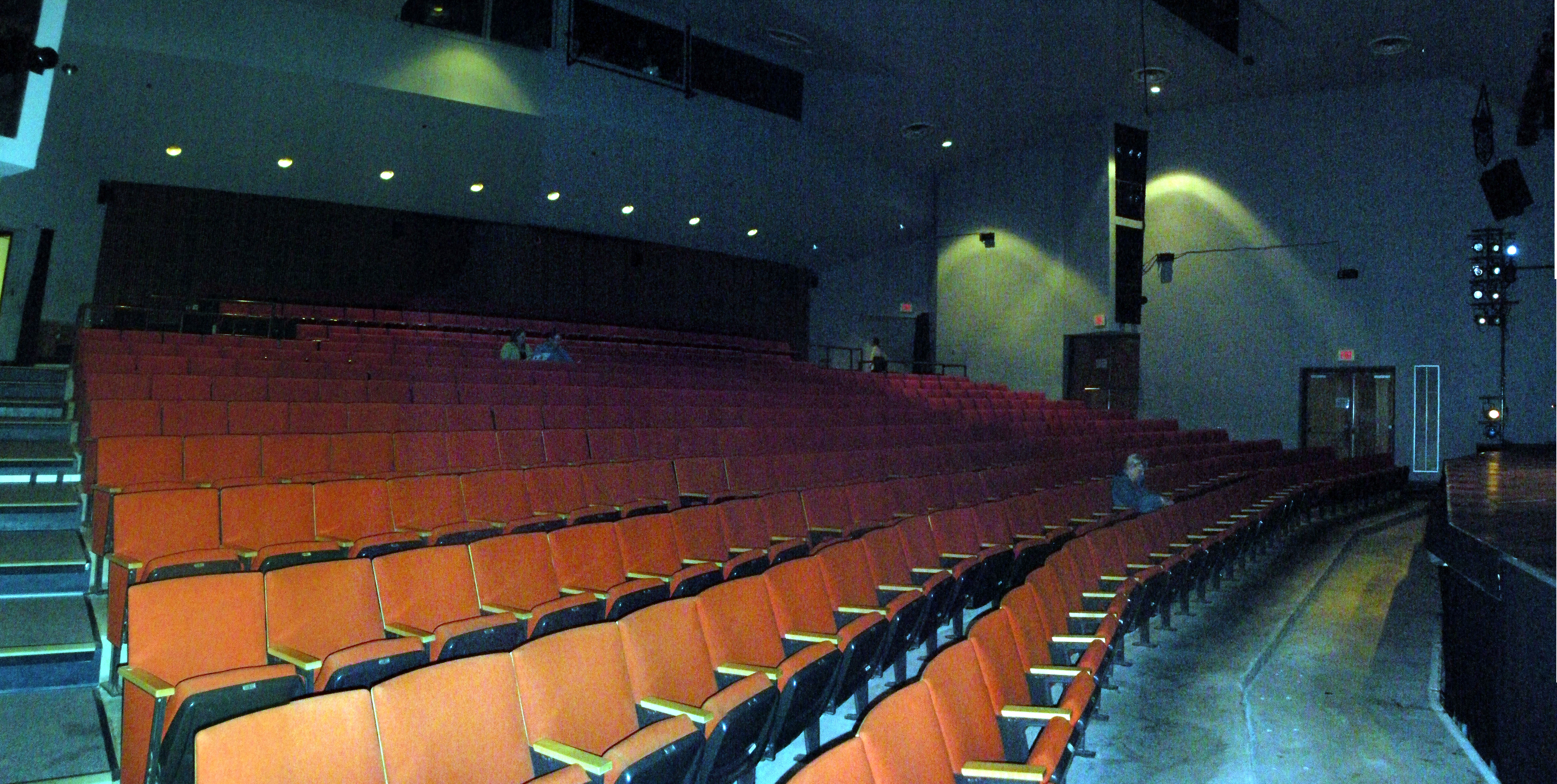
Frank Center Stage

The George Tyler Moore Center for the Study of the Civil War is home to Shepherd University's academic concentrations related to the Civil War and 19th Century America. The program requires students to complete specialized courses in addition to the courses already required of all history majors. Courses concentrate on various elements of 19th century history such as The American Civil War, 1850–1865; the Reconstruction Era; African American History; Soldiers and Society, 1861–65; and the Old South. Students also conduct primary research within the topic area and must intern at one of various historic sites in the region, such as Harpers Ferry National Historical Park.

=== Bonnie and Bill Stubblefield Institute for Civil Political Communications ===
The Bonnie and Bill Stubblefield Institute for Civil Political Communications is a non-partisan collaboration of political science scholars, students, and activists that hosts lectures, debates, and public forums at Shepherd University. The Stubblefield Institute’s mission is to “promote greater public awareness of how authentic and factual civil discourse across partisan divides leads to more productive debate and understanding.”

Since opening its doors in 2019, the Stubblefield Institute leads a variety of student-focused initiatives on Shepherd University’s campus. The student-run Shepherd University Civility Club hosts events for students to debate current topics in a civil space. “Listen. Learn. Engage.” Is a student programming initiative to assist students in developing the skills and confidence to participate in civil discussion. Additionally, the Stubblefield Institute hosts Community Engage Conversations, public forums focusing on local and West Virginia issues.

=== Public transportation ===
The Eastern Panhandle Transit Authority operates two bus routes in the university; the Ram Force One and the Ram Force Express. The Ram Force One offers limited service to Caperton Train Station.

== Athletics ==
The Shepherd athletic teams are called the Rams. The university is a member of the NCAA Division II ranks of the National Collegiate Athletic Association (NCAA), primarily competing in the Pennsylvania State Athletic Conference (PSAC) since the 2019–20 academic year. The Rams previously competed in the Mountain East Conference (MEC) from 2013–14 to 2018–19, and before that, the now-defunct West Virginia Intercollegiate Athletic Conference (WVIAC) from 1924–25 to 2012–13.

Shepherd fields 15 intercollegiate teams: Men's sports include baseball, basketball, cross country, football, golf, soccer and tennis; while women's sports include basketball, cross country, golf, lacrosse, soccer, softball, tennis and volleyball.

== Notable people ==
=== Notable alumni ===
- Tyson Bagent, professional football player for the Chicago Bears
- Sammi Brown, former member of the West Virginia House of Delegates (2018-2020)
- John J. Cornwell, 15th governor of West Virginia (1917-1921)
- Brenton Doyle, professional baseball player
- John Doyle, former member of the West Virginia House of Delegates (2018-2022)
- Michael Folk, former member of the West Virginia House of Delegates (2013-2019)
- Gina Marie Groh, attorney and federal judge
- Bob Holmes, attorney and member of the Georgia House of Representatives (1975-2009)
- Eric Householder, member of the West Virginia House of Delegates (2023- )
- George William Johnson, former Congressman from West Virginia (1923-1925, 1933-1943)
- Tiffany Lawrence, former member of the West Virginia House of Delegates (2009-2015)
- Matt K. Lewis, political writer and podcaster
- Ronald F. Miller, former member of the West Virginia Senate (2011-2017)
- David Plunkert, illustrator and graphic designer
- Arthur Edward Ruark, physicist, known for his role in the development of quantum mechanics
- Jill Upson, first African-American female Republican member of the West Virginia House of Delegates (2015-2019)
- Franke Wilmer, former member of the Montana House of Representatives (2007-2015)
