= List of college football career coaching losses leaders =

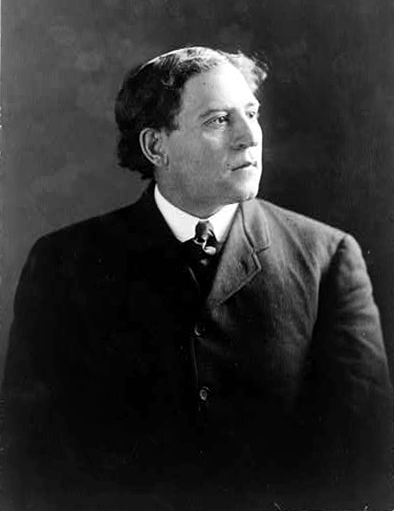
As of 2025, coaching legend Amos Alonzo Stagg has the third most losses of any college football head coach in history. As of 2025, he is tenth all-time in wins and first all-time in ties.

This is a list of college football coaches with 100 career losses. "College level" is defined as a four-year college or university program in either the National Association of Intercollegiate Athletics or the National Collegiate Athletic Association. If the team competed at a time before the official organization of either of the two groups but is generally accepted as a "college football program" it would also be included.

Watson Brown, whose head coaching tenure included stints at Austin Peay (1979–1980), Cincinnati (1983), Vanderbilt (1986–1990), UAB (1995–2006), and Tennessee Tech (2007–2015), holds the record for most losses with 211. The Daily Oklahoman wrote that "only good football coaches are allowed to lose as many" as Brown, much like "only good baseball pitchers are allowed to absorb 20 losses in a season or 150–200 losses in a career". Brown broke the former mark of 199 held by Amos Alonzo Stagg, who also held the major college record for wins until 1981. Brown's younger brother, Mack Brown, ranks among the winningest college football coaches with 282 career wins.

Individuals indicated in bold type are expected to remain coaching in the next college football season of 2026.

The list of coaches is current as of the end of the 2025 season. (Note: The list includes coaches with 100 losses regardless of division.)

== Details ==
=== Active coaches ===
31 coaches on the list are considered "active" for the 2025 season.

=== Most total losses ===
As of the end of the 2025 season, Watson Brown is the all-time leader in career losses with a total of 211.

=== Win percentage ===
John Gagliardi leads the list in terms of winning percentage at .775. A total of 119 coaches have made the list and still maintained a winning percentage of .500 or above as of 2025. Mick Caba has the lowest winning percentage on the list with .176, having only 22 wins and 103 losses.

== List of college football coaches with 100 losses ==
Head coach	First year	Last year	Total years	Games coached	Wins	Losses	Ties	Win %	Team(s)
Watson Brown	1979	2015	31	348	136	211	1	.392	Austin Peay (1979–1980), Cincinnati (1983), Rice (1984–1985), Vanderbilt (1986–1990), UAB (1995–2006), Tennessee Tech (2007–2015)
Roland Ortmayer	1946	1990	45	400	183	209	8	.468	William Penn (1946–1947), La Verne (1948–1990)
Amos Alonzo Stagg, Sr.	1890	1946	55	548	314	199	35	.605	Springfield YMCA (1890–1891), Chicago (1892–1932), Pacific (1933–1946)
Jimmye Laycock	1980	2018	39	445	249	194	2	.562	William & Mary (1980–2018)
Barry H. Streeter	1978	2017	38	394	196	193	5	.504	Gettysburg (1978–2003, 2005–2017)
Bob Ford	1965	2013	45	457	265	191	1	.581	St. Lawrence (1965–1968), Albany (1973–2013)
Mike Price	1981	2012	31	360	177	183	0	.492	Weber State (1981–1988), Washington State (1989–2002), UTEP (2004–2012, 2017)
Terry Price	1976	2010	35	306	123	181	2	.405	Pillsbury Baptist Bible (1976–1984), Maranatha Baptist (1985–2010)
Hayden Fry	1962	1998	37	420	232	178	10	.564	SMU (1962–1972), North Texas State (1973–1978), Iowa (1979–1998)
Buddy Teevens	1985	2023	32	331	151	178	2	.459	Maine (1985–1986), Dartmouth (1987–1991, 2005–2023), Tulane (1992–1996), Stanford (2003–2004)
Mertz Mortorelli	1954	1983	30	241	52	176	13	.243	Wisconsin–Superior (1954–1983)
Lombe Honaker	1914	1958	45	372	172	176	24	.495	Lincoln (1914–1916), Baldwin–Wallace (1917–1918), Southwestern (1919–1920), Maryville (1921–1958)
Jess C. Neely	1924	1966	43	402	207	176	19	.539	Southwestern (1924–1927), Clemson (1931–1939), Rice (1940–1966)
Paul Vosburgh	1985	2024	35	365	192	173	0	.526	William Penn (1985–1987), St. John Fisher (1991–2024)
Dennis Miller	1986	2019	34	321	149	172	0	.464	Northern State (1986–1997), Wisconsin Lutheran (2000–2012, 2014–2019)
**Jack Cosgrove**	1993	present	30	326	154	172	0	.472	Maine (1993–2015), Colby (2018–present)
Jim Parady	1992	2023	31	327	155	171	1	.476	Marist (1992–2023)
**Dave Murray**	1990	present	35	346	176	170	0	.509	Cortland (1990–1996), Lebanon Valley (1997), Alfred (1998–2013), Hamilton (2014–present)
Kevin Donley	1978	2024	46	528	356	171	1	.675	Anderson (1978–1981), Georgetown (1982–1992), California (1993–1996), Saint Francis (1998–2024)
Eddie Robinson	1941	1997	55	591	408	167	16	.704	Louisiana Normal / Grambling / Grambling State (1941–1997)
Ron Randleman	1969	2004	35	386	218	167	1	.566	William Penn (1969–1975), Pittsburg State (1976–1981), Sam Houston State (1982–2004)
Brien Cullen	1985	2019	34	346	181	165	0	.523	Worcester State (1985–2019)
Geno DeMarco	1993	2025	33	336	173	163	0	.515	Geneva (1993–2025)
Mike Ayers	1985	2017	33	380	218	160	2	.576	East Tennessee State (1985–1987), Wofford (1988–2017)
Brian Keller	1996	2025	30	292	133	159	0	.455	Nebraska Wesleyan (1996–2025)
Peter Mazzaferro	1959	2004	41	378	209	158	11	.567	Waynesburg (1959–1962), Curry (1963), Bridgewater State (1968–1986, 1988–2004)
Marvin L. Kay	1969	1994	26	247	84	157	6	.352	Colorado Mines (1969–1994)
Rich Brooks	1977	2009	25	290	130	156	4	.455	Oregon (1977–1994), Kentucky (2003–2009)
Bill Klika	1974	2001	25	222	66	155	1	.300	Fairleigh Dickinson–Florham (1974–1996, 2000–2001)
Tim Clifton	1993	2024	32	326	171	155	0	.525	Mars Hill (1993–2024)
Andy Talley	1979	2016	37	414	257	155	2	.623	St. Lawrence (1979–1983), Villanova (1985–2016)
Mack Brown	1983	2024	36	444	288	154	1	.651	Appalachian State (1983), Tulane (1985–1987), North Carolina (1988–1997, 2019–2024), Texas (1998–2013)
Jim Sweeney	1963	1996	32	358	201	153	4	.567	Montana State (1963–1967), Washington State (1968–1975), Fresno State (1976–1996)
Bobby Wallace	1988	2010	28	324	171	152	1	.481	North Alabama (1988–1997, 2012–2016), Temple (1998–2005), West Alabama (2006–2010)
Andy Lambert	1997	2023	26	272	120	152	0	.441	Trinity International (1997–2003), Sterling (2004–2015), Southern Nazarene (2016–2019), Concordia (2021–2023)
**Kevin Callahan**	1993	present	33	336	197	151	0	.566	Monmouth (1993–present)
Howard Schnellenberger	1979	2011	27	312	158	151	3	.511	Miami (1979–1983), Louisville (1985–1994), Oklahoma (1995), Florida Atlantic (2001–2011)
Grant Teaff	1960	1992	30	325	170	151	8	.529	McMurry (1960–1965), Angelo State (1969–1971), Baylor (1972–1992)
Dwight Beede	1926	1972	38	344	175	149	20	.538	Westminster (1926–1930), Geneva (1934–1936), Youngstown / Youngstown State (1938–1972)
Jim Collins	1994	2025	29	305	155	150	0	.508	Dubuque (1994–1996), Capital (1997–2007), Saginaw Valley State (2008–2018), Wittenberg (2022–2025)
**Kirk Ferentz**	1990	present	30	370	221	149	0	.597	Maine (1990–1992), Iowa (1999–present)
DeOrmond "Tuss" McLaughry	1915	1954	40	305	143	149	13	.490	Westminster (1915–1916, 1918, 1921), Amherst (1922–1925), Brown (1926–1940), Dartmouth (1945–1954)
Andrew C. "Scrappy" Moore	1931	1967	35	332	171	148	13	.535	Chattanooga (1931–1967)
Dick Tomey	1977	2009	29	335	183	145	7	.557	Hawaii (1977–1986), Arizona (1987–2000), San Jose State (2005–2009)
Frank Beamer	1981	2015	35	427	280	143	4	.660	Murray State (1981–1986), Virginia Tech (1987–2015)
Frank M. Dobson	1909	1948	37	303	137	142	24	.492	Georgia (1909), Clemson (1910–1912), Richmond (1913–1917, 1919–1933), South Carolina (1918), Maryland (1936–1939), Apprentice (1940–1948)
John Pont	1956	1992	25	252	107	141	4	.433	Miami (1956–1962), Yale (1963–1964), Indiana (1965–1972), Northwestern (1973–1977), Mount St. Joseph (1990–1992)
Buddy Benson	1965	1995	31	310	162	140	8	.535	Ouachita Baptist (1965–1995)
Ken Hatfield	1979	2005	27	312	168	140	4	.545	Air Force (1979–1983), Arkansas (1984–1989), Clemson (1990–1993), Rice (1994–2005)
Terry Bowden	1983	2023	28	327	185	140	2	.569	Salem (1983–1985), Samford (1987–1992), Auburn (1993–1998), North Alabama (2009–2011), Akron (2012–2018), Louisiana–Monroe (2021–2023)
**Paul Castonia**	1998	present	25	252	112	140	0	.444	UMass–Boston (1998–2000), Plymouth State (2003–present)
Walt Hameline	1981	2014	33	365	224	139	2	.615	Wagner (1981–2014)
**Todd Knight**	1993	present	32	336	197	139	2	.586	Delta State (1993–1998), Ouachita Baptist (1999–present)
Keith Otterbein	1986	2023	29	329	187	139	3	.573	Ferris State (1986–1994), Hillsdale (2002–2023)
John Gagliardi	1949	2012	64	638	489	138	11	.775	Carroll (1949–1952), Saint John's (1953–2012)
**Rich Rodriguez**	1988	present	28	333	194	137	2	.586	Salem (1988), Glenville State (1990–1996), West Virginia (2001–2007), Michigan (2008–2010), Arizona (2012–2017), Jacksonville State (2022–2024), West Virginia (2025–present)
Johnny Majors	1968	1996	29	332	185	137	10	.572	Iowa State (1968–1972), Pittsburgh (1973–1976, 1993–1996), Tennessee (1977–1992)
Rob Ash	1980	2015	36	388	246	137	5	.640	Juniata (1980–1988), Drake (1989–2006), Montana State (2007–2015)
Ed DeGeorge	1977	2005	29	272	135	136	1	.498	Beloit (1977–2005)
Joe Paterno	1966	2011	46	548	409	136	3	.749	Penn State (1966–2011)
Dennis Franchione	1981	2015	30	350	213	135	2	.611	Southwestern (1981–1982), Pittsburg State (1985–1989), Southwest Texas State / Texas State (1990–1991, 2011–2015), New Mexico (1992–1997), TCU (1998–2000), Alabama (2001–2002), Texas A&M (2003–2007)
Jerry Moore	1979	2012	31	379	242	135	2	.637	North Texas State (1979–1980), Texas Tech (1981–1985), Appalachian State (1989–2012)
Lew Elverson	1938	1974	32	244	102	135	7	.432	Swarthmore (1938–1941, 1946–1972, 1974), Atlantic City NAS (1943–1944)
Al Bagnoli	1982	2022	41	403	269	134	0	.667	Union (1982–1991), Penn (1992–2014), Columbia (2015–2022)
Tim Murphy	1987	2023	36	367	232	134	1	.634	Maine (1987–1988), Cincinnati (1989–1993), Harvard (1994–2023)
Chuck Mills	1959	1997	27	270	132	133	5	.498	Pomona (1959–1961), Indiana State (1962–1963), Merchant Marine (1964), Utah State (1967–1972), Wake Forest (1973–1977), Southern Oregon (1980–1988), Coast Guard (1997)
Norm Eash	1987	2024	38	367	233	133	1	.636	Illinois Wesleyan (1987–2024)
Ken Crandall	1998	2014	17	179	47	132	0	.263	Minnesota Morris (1998–2006), Southwestern (2007–2014)
Willie Jeffries	1973	2001	29	318	180	132	6	.575	South Carolina State (1973–1978, 1989–2001), Wichita State (1979–1983), Howard (1984–1988)
George Welsh	1973	2000	28	325	189	132	4	.588	Navy (1973–1981), Virginia (1982–2000)
Lou Holtz	1969	2004	33	388	249	132	7	.651	William & Mary (1969–1971), NC State (1972–1975), Arkansas (1977–1983), Minnesota (1984–1985), Notre Dame (1986–1996), South Carolina (1999–2004)
Jim Wacker	1971	1996	26	293	159	131	3	.548	Texas Lutheran (1971–1975), North Dakota State (1976–1978), Southwest Texas State (1979–1982), TCU (1983–1991), Minnesota (1992–1996)
Bob Spoo	1987	2011	25	276	144	131	1	.524	Eastern Illinois (1987–2011)
Ray Morrison	1915	1952	32	318	155	130	33	.539	SMU (1915–1916, 1922–1934), Vanderbilt (1918, 1935–1939), Temple (1940–1948), Austin (1949–1952)
Carlin B. Carpenter	1979	2002	24	230	100	130	0	.435	Bluffton (1979–2002)
Jimmy "Red" Parker	1961	1998	26	281	143	130	8	.523	Arkansas A&M (1961–1965), The Citadel (1966–1972), Clemson (1973–1976), Southern Arkansas (1981), Delta State (1982–1987), Ouachita Baptist (1996–1998)
Jim Hazlett	1962	1986	23	212	75	130	7	.370	Edinboro (1962–1965), Susquehanna (1966–1977), Kean (1980–1986)
Chris Beaton	1983	2005	23	216	85	130	1	.396	Simon Fraser (1983–2005)
Bill Mallory	1969	1996	27	301	168	129	4	.565	Miami (1969–1973), Colorado (1974–1978), Northern Illinois (1980–1983), Indiana (1984–1996)
**Chris Creighton**	1997	present	29	329	200	129	0	.608	Ottawa (KS) (1997–2000), Wabash (2001–2007), Drake (2008–2013), Eastern Michigan (2014–present)
Bobby Bowden	1959	2009	44	510	377	129	4	.743	Howard (1959–1962), West Virginia (1970–1975), Florida State (1976–2009)
Bill Curry	1980	2012	20	225	93	128	4	.422	Georgia Tech (1980–1986), Alabama (1987–1989), Kentucky (1990–1996), Georgia State (2010–2012)
Lou Little	1924	1956	33	292	151	128	13	.539	Georgetown (1924–1929), Columbia (1930–1956)
Eddie Anderson	1922	1964	39	344	201	128	15	.606	Columbia (1922–1924), DePaul (1925–1931), Holy Cross (1933–1938, 1950–1964), Iowa (1939–1942, 1946–1949)
Don Nehlen	1968	2000	30	338	202	128	8	.609	Bowling Green (1968–1976), West Virginia (1980–2000)
Bob Nielson	1989	2024	32	368	239	128	1	.651	Ripon (1989–1990), Wartburg (1991–1995), Wisconsin–Eau Claire (1996–1998), Minnesota–Duluth (1999–2003, 2008–2012), Western Illinois (2013–2015), South Dakota (2016–2024)
Chuck Shelton	1977	1995	19	209	81	127	1	.390	Drake (1977–1985), Utah State (1986–1991), Pacific (1992–1995)
Bob Griffin	1972	1992	21	228	100	127	1	.441	Idaho State (1972–1975), Rhode Island (1976–1992)
**Willie Fritz**	1997	present	29	348	221	127	0	.635	Central Missouri (1997–2009), Sam Houston State (2010–2013), Georgia Southern (2014–2015), Tulane (2016–2023), Houston (2024–present)
Mike Dau	1966	1991	25	209	80	126	3	.390	Lake Forest (1966–1991)
Larry Smith	1976	2000	24	276	143	126	7	.531	Tulane (1976–1979), Arizona (1980–1986), USC (1987–1992), Missouri (1994–2000)
Bill Dooley	1967	1992	26	294	163	126	5	.563	North Carolina (1967–1977), Virginia Tech (1978–1986), Wake Forest (1987–1992)
Don Read	1968	1995	22	282	155	126	1	.551	Portland State (1968–1971, 1981–1985), Oregon (1974–1976), Oregon Tech (1977–1980), Montana State (1986–1995)
Ivan Grove	1920	1955	29	253	111	126	16	.470	Oklahoma Baptist (1920–1921), Hendrix (1924–1955)
**Jeremy Cameron**	2005	present	20	196	70	126	0	.357	Massachusetts Maritime (2005–present)
Bill George	1999	2019	21	201	75	126	0	.373	Coast Guard (1999–2019)
Maurice Hunt	1977	1997	19	195	65	125	5	.346	Central State (1977–1978), Morehouse (1979–1989, 1995–1996), Kentucky State (1992–1994), Lane (1997)
Terry Allen	1989	2014	22	258	133	125	0	.516	Northern Iowa (1989–1996), Kansas (1997–2001), Missouri State (2006–2014)
Rich Lackner	1986	2021	35	361	234	125	2	.651	Carnegie Mellon (1986–2021)
Roy Kidd	1964	2002	39	446	314	124	8	.715	Eastern Kentucky (1964–2002)
Robert Kolf	1929	1962	30	198	59	123	16	.338	Oshkosh State (1929, 1931–1942, 1946–1962)
Roger Waialae	2005	2025	21	224	101	123	0	.451	West Liberty (2005–2025)
Terry Price	1985	2009	25	225	101	123	1	.451	Maranatha Baptist (1985–2009)
John Prock	1964	1987	24	244	114	123	7	.482	Harding (1964–1987)
Jerry Claiborne	1961	1989	28	309	179	122	8	.592	VPI / Virginia Tech (1961–1970), Maryland (1972–1981), Kentucky (1982–1989)
Shannon Currier	2000	2025	18	198	76	122	0	.384	Concordia–St. Paul (2000–2003), Truman (2004–2008), Concordia–St. Paul (2016–2025)
Bob Ricca	1974	2002	28	295	172	121	2	.579	St. John's (1974–2002)
Glen Mason	1986	2006	21	245	123	121	1	.504	Kent State (1986–1987), Kansas (1988–1996), Minnesota (1997–2006)
Hank Biesiot	1976	2013	38	380	258	121	1	.680	Dickinson State (1976–2013)
Jim Grobe	1995	2016	20	293	171	121	1	.492	Ohio (1995–2000), Wake Forest (2001–2013), Baylor (2016)
Edor Nelson	1947	1969	23	184	55	120	9	.323	Augsburg (1947–1969)
Kirby Cannon	1999	2015	14	156	36	120	0	.245	Missouri–Rolla (1999–2009), Austin Peay (2013–2015)
Jackie Sherrill	1976	2003	26	304	180	120	4	.599	Washington State (1976), Pittsburgh (1977–1981), Texas A&M (1982–1988), Mississippi State (1991–2003)
**Sherman Wood**	1993	present	33	344	224	120	1	.651	Bowie State (1993–1998), Salisbury State / Salisbury (1999–present)
Carmen Cozza	1965	1996	32	303	179	119	5	.599	Yale (1965–1996)
Harold R. "Tubby" Raymond	1966	2001	36	422	300	119	3	.714	Delaware (1966–2001)
Brent Holsclaw	2003	2017	15	161	42	119	0	.261	Kentucky Wesleyan (2003–2017)
**K. C. Keeler**	1993	present	32	396	276	119	1	.698	Rowan (1993–2001), Delaware (2002–2012), Sam Houston (2014–2022), Temple (2025–present)
**Chris Douglas**	2002	present	20	190	71	119	0	.374	Southwestern (KS) (2002–2006), MacMurray (2011–2019), Lyon (2020–present)
Frank Howard	1940	1969	30	295	165	118	12	.580	Clemson (1940–1969)
Fred Martinelli	1959	1993	35	348	218	118	12	.644	Ashland (1959–1993)
Dan McCarney	1995	2015	17	195	78	117	0	.400	Iowa State (1995–2006), North Texas (2011–2015)
Bill Snyder	1989	2018	27	333	215	117	1	.647	Kansas State (1989–2018)
Monte Cater	1981	2017	37	394	275	117	2	.701	Lakeland (1981–1986), Shepherd (1987–2017)
**Frank Sheptock**	1996	present	23	242	125	117	0	.517	Wilkes (1996–2013), Bloomsburg (2020–present)
Jerry Boyes	1986	2018	18	254	138	116	0	.543	Buffalo State (1986–2000, 2009–2018)
Ben Martin	1956	1977	22	228	102	116	10	.469	Virginia (1956–1957), Air Force (1958–1977)
Chris Hatcher	2000	2025	26	299	183	116	0	.612	Valdosta State (2000–2006), Georgia Southern (2007–2009), Murray State (2010–2014), Samford (2015–2025)
Charlie Weatherbie	1992	2009	17	191	76	115	0	.398	Utah State (1992–1994), Navy (1995–2001), Louisiana–Monroe (2003–2009)
Steve Marino	1990	2013	24	235	119	115	1	.509	Westfield State (1990–2013)
**Joe Loth**	2000	present	25	252	137	115	0	.544	Kean (2000–2002), Otterbein (2003–2011), Western Connecticut (2012–2024), Southern Connecticut (2025–present)
Tom Horne	1982	2004	19	200	84	114	2	.425	Iowa Wesleyan (1982–1984), Valparaiso (1989–2004)
Bob Sullivan	1979	2000	22	216	102	114	0	.472	Carleton (1979–2000)
Darwin Breaux	1993	2016	25	245	131	113	1	.537	Dickinson (1993–2016)
Fritz S. Brennecke	1947	1968	22	199	78	113	8	.412	Colorado Mines (1947–1968)
Bill Russo	1978	1999	22	235	118	113	4	.511	Wagner (1978–1980), Lafayette (1981–1999)
**Jeff Filkovski**	2008	present	18	173	60	113	0	.347	Mariette (2008–2012), North Carolina Wesleyan (2013–present)
John Stiegelmeier	1997	2022	26	311	199	112	0	.640	South Dakota State (1997–2022)
John O'Grady	1989	2010	21	219	105	112	2	.484	Wisconsin–River Falls (1989–2010)
Don Ruggeri	1973	2000	28	259	146	112	1	.566	Massachusetts Maritime (1973–2000)
Tommy Mont	1956	1976	21	195	78	112	5	.413	Maryland (1956–1958), DePauw (1959–1976)
Tom Gilburg	1975	2002	28	274	160	112	2	.588	Franklin & Marshall (1975–2002)
Howard "Howdy" Myers	1946	1979	30	284	167	112	5	.597	Johns Hopkins (1946–1949, 1979), Hofstra (1950–1974)
Bob Blackman	1953	1982	30	287	168	112	7	.598	Denver (1953–1954), Dartmouth (1956–1970), Illinois (1971–1976), Cornell (1977–1982)
**Jerry Schmitt**	2000	present	26	275	163	112	0	.593	Westminster (2000–2004), Duquesne (2005–present)
Frederick Dunlap	1965	1987	23	242	126	111	5	.531	Lehigh (1965–1975), Colgate (1976–1987)
Dennis Raetz	1980	2007	19	205	93	111	1	.456	Indiana State (1980–1997, 2007)
Rick Stockstill	2006	2023	18	224	113	111	0	.504	Middle Tennessee (2006–2023)
**Tom Masella**	1996	present	16	169	58	111	0	.343	Boston University (1996–1997), Central Connecticut (2004–2005), Fordham (2006–2011), Wagner (2020–present)
A. C. Burcky	1924	1950	25	167	41	110	16	.293	Bluffton (1924–1950)
Sam Kornhauser	1984	2005	22	205	105	110	0	.488	Stony Brook (1984–2005)
Bill Manlove	1969	2001	32	323	212	110	1	.658	Pennsylvania Military / Widener (1969–1991), Delaware Valley (1992–1995), La Salle (1997–2001)
Steve Johnson	1989	2023	34	362	252	110	1	.696	Bethel (1989–2023)
**Peter Gallagher**	2001	present	24	248	138	110	0	.556	Ursinus (2001–present)
Brian Kelly	1991	2025	36	409	297	110	2	.729	Grand Valley State (1991–2003), Central Michigan (2004–2006), Cincinnati (2006–2009), Notre Dame (2010–2021), LSU (2022–2025)
Jim Walden	1978	1994	17	188	72	109	7	.402	Washington State (1978–1986), Iowa State (1987–1994)
Fisher DeBerry	1984	2006	23	279	169	109	1	.608	Air Force (1984–2006)
**Dan Garrett**	2006	present	20	196	87	109	0	.444	Kean (2006–present)
Chris Ault	1976	2012	28	343	234	108	1	.684	Nevada (1976–2012)
Bill Yeoman	1962	1986	25	276	160	108	8	.597	Houston (1962–1986)
Jim Hess	1974	1996	22	247	134	108	5	.553	Angelo State (1974–1981), Stephen F. Austin (1982–1988), New Mexico State (1990–1996)
**Chris Robertson**	2006	present	19	189	81	108	0	.429	Salve Regina (2006–2009), WPI (2010–present)
**Greg Schiano**	2001	present	17	207	99	108	0	.478	Rutgers (2001–2011), (2020–present)
Steve Wilson	1989	2007	17	189	82	107	0	.434	Howard (1989–2001), Texas Southern (2004–2007)
Aldo Donelli	1939	1967	25	220	105	107	8	.495	Duquesne (1939–1942), Boston University (1947–1956), Columbia (1957–1967)
Bill Bowes	1972	1998	27	286	175	106	5	.621	New Hampshire (1972–1998)
Glenn Scobey "Pop" Warner	1895	1938	44	457	319	106	32	.733	Georgia (1895–1896), Cornell (1897–1898, 1904–1906), Carlisle (1899–1903, 1907–1914), Pittsburgh (1915–1923), Stanford (1924–1932), Temple (1933–1938)
Bill Samko	1987	2010	23	199	92	106	1	.465	Sewanee (1987–1993), Tufts (1994–2010)
Bob Bierie	1980	2004	25	251	144	106	1	.576	Loras (1980–2004)
Bruce Snyder	1976	2000	21	237	125	106	6	.540	Utah State (1976–1982), California (1987–1991), Arizona State (1992–2000)
Tim Keating	1988	2011	34	245	136	106	3	.561	Wesley (1988–1992), Western Maryland / McDaniel (1993–2011)
Edd Bowers	1956	1978	23	196	89	105	2	.459	Iowa Wesleyan (1956–1959), Grinnell (1960–1978)
Jason M. Saunderson	1908	1941	33	243	124	105	14	.539	South Dakota State (1908–1910), Morningside (1912–1941)
Bob Odell	1958	1986	28	245	136	104	5	.651	Bucknell (1958–1964), Penn (1965–1970), Williams (1971–1986)
Bill Hayes	1976	2002	27	301	195	104	2	.651	Winston-Salem State (1976–1987), North Carolina A&T (1988–2002)
Thomas "Tank" Conrad	1944	1969	26	213	99	104	10	.488	Delaware State (1944–1949), Winston-Salem State (1950–1969)
**Jeff Thomas**	2010	present	16	144	40	104	0	.278	Puget Sound (2010–present)
Mick Caba	1985	2014	13	125	22	103	0	.176	Iowa Wesleyan (1985–1988), Oklahoma Panhandle State (1989–1990), Minnesota–Morris (1991–1992), William Penn (1997–1998), Alfred State (2012–2014)
Bobby Johnson	1994	2009	16	191	89	102	0	.466	Furman (1994–2001), Vanderbilt (2002–2009)
Don Jones	1949	1978	28	206	97	102	7	.488	Hamilton (1949–1978)
Jim Christopherson	1969	2000	32	326	217	102	7	.676	Concordia–Moorhead (1969–2000)
Gary Buer	1977	2006	20	199	92	102	5	.475	Dakota State (1977–1978), Southwest State (1979–1992), Southern Virginia (2003–2006)
Dick Tressel	1978	2000	33	228	124	102	2	.548	Hamline (1978–2000)
Todd Berry	1996	2015	14	159	57	102	0	.358	Illinois State (1996–1999), Army (2000–2003), Louisiana Monroe (2010–2015)
Cally Gault	1963	1984	22	236	127	101	8	.555	Presbyterian (1963–1984)
**Pat Fitzgerald**	2006	present	17	211	110	101	0	.521	Northwestern (2006–2022), Michigan State (2026–present)
Jim Reid	1986	2007	17	191	87	101	3	.463	UMass (1986–1991), Richmond (1995–2003), VMI (2006–2007)
Bobby Ross	1973	2006	18	206	103	101	2	.505	The Citadel (1973–1977), Maryland (1982–1986), Georgia Tech (1987–1991), Army (2004–2006)
Stan Sheriff	1960	1982	23	234	129	101	4	.560	Iowa State Teachers / State College of Iowa / Northern Iowa (1960–1982)
Pat Malley	1959	1984	26	246	140	101	5	.579	Santa Clara (1959–1984)
LaVell Edwards	1972	2000	29	361	257	101	3	.716	BYU (1972–2000)
Greg Carlson	1982	2005	27	259	156	101	2	.606	Wabash (1982–2000). Whittier (2003–2005), St. Scholastica (2008–2013)
Jerry Vandergriff	1982	2004	23	245	143	100	2	.588	Angelo State (1982–2004)
Chuck Priore	2000	2023	23	236	136	100	0	.576	Trinity (2000–2005), Stony Brook (2006–2023)
Paul Johnson	1997	2018	22	289	189	100	0	.654	Georgia Southern (1997–2001), Navy (2002–2007), Georgia Tech (2008–2018)
Steve Bell	2000	present	26	260	160	100	0	.615	Monmouth (IL) (2000–2014), Augustana (IL) (2015–present)

== See also ==
- List of college football career coaching wins leaders
- List of college football career coaching winning percentage leaders
- List of college football seasons coached leaders
