= 2025 NCAA Division II football season =

American college football season

- Total No. of teams: 161
- Regular season: August 28 – November 15, 2025
- Playoffs: November 22 – December 20, 2025
- National Championship: McKinney Independent School District Stadium; McKinney, TX; December 20, 2025
- Champion: Ferris State
- Harlon Hill Trophy: Curtis Allen, RB, Virginia Union

The 2025 NCAA Division II football season, part of college football in the United States organized by the National Collegiate Athletic Association (NCAA) at the Division II level, began on August 28 and ended on December 20 with the Division II championship at the McKinney Independent School District Stadium in McKinney, Texas.

== Conference changes and new programs ==
- Conference Carolinas resumed sponsoring football in 2025, after dropping the sport 50 years earlier prior to the 1975 season.

School	Former conference	New conference	Ref
Barton Bulldogs	SAC	Carolinas	
Chowan Hawks	Gulf South	Carolinas	
Erskine Flying Fleet	Gulf South	Carolinas	
Ferrum Panthers	ODAC (D-III)	Carolinas	
Jamestown Jimmies	North Star (NAIA)	NSIC	
Limestone Saints	SAC	School closed	
Mississippi College Choctaws	Gulf South	Dropped program	
New Haven Chargers	NE-10	Northeast (D-I FCS)	
North Greenville Trailblazers	Gulf South	Carolinas	
Shorter Hawks	Independent (D-II)	Carolinas	
UNC Pembroke Braves	Mountain East	Carolinas	

== Headlines ==
- January 17 – At the 2025 NCAA Convention, Division II's football-sponsoring delegates approved a proposal to award automatic bids to the playoffs for the conference champion of each football-sponsoring conference, replacing the earned access model.
- April 23 – In accordance with Division II championship policy, which states that automatic qualifiers must make up no more than 50% of the playoff field, the Division II Executive Board approved the expansion of the football playoff bracket from 28 to 32 teams, effective with the 2025 season.

== Kickoff games ==
Date	Visiting team	Home team	Site	Result	Attendance	Ref.
August 31	No. T–24 Miles	No. 19 Virginia Union	Tom Benson Hall of Fame Stadium • Canton, Ohio (Black College Football Hall of Fame Classic)	3–45	3,280	
^{#}Rankings from AFCA Coaches poll released prior to the game.

== Top 10 matchups ==
This section lists games between top ten ranked teams in the AFCA Coaches poll during the season.

=== Regular season ===
Date	Visiting team	Home team	Site	Result	Attendance	Ref.
August 28	No. 9 Pittsburg State	No. 1 Ferris State	Top Taggart Field • Big Rapids, Michigan	17–34	5,434	
September 27	No. 8 California (PA)	No. 4 Slippery Rock	Mihalik-Thompson Stadium • Slippery Rock, Pennsylvania	45–38	7,670	
October 4	No. 9 UT Permian Basin	No. 5 Angelo State	LeGrand Sports Complex • San Angelo, Texas	28–14	4,989	
October 18	No. 3 West Florida	No. 8 West Alabama	Tiger Stadium • Livingston, Alabama	23–16	4,789	
November 1	No. 7 CSU Pueblo	No. 6 Western Colorado	Mountaineer Bowl • Gunnison, Colorado	24–21	2,773	
^{#}Rankings from AFCA Coaches poll released prior to the game.

=== Postseason tournament ===
Date	Visiting team	Home team	Site	Result	Attendance	Ref.
November 22	No. 10 UT Permian Basin	No. 4 CSU Pueblo	ThunderBowl • Pueblo, Colorado (First round–Super region 4)	37–24	2,372	
November 29	No. 6 Pittsburg State	No. 2 Harding	First Security Stadium • Searcy, Arkansas (Second round–Super region 4)	21–37	2,125	
December 6	No. 10 UT Permian Basin	No. 2 Harding	First Security Stadium • Searcy, Arkansas (National quarterfinal)	28–34	2,775	
December 13	No. 2 Harding	No. 3 Kutztown	Andre Reed Stadium • Kutztown, Pennsylvania (National semifinal)	49–27	5,856	
December 20	No. 2 Harding	No. 1 Ferris State	McKinney ISD Stadium • McKinney, Texas (National championship game)	21–42	10,521	
^{#}Rankings from AFCA Coaches poll released on November 17.

== Upsets ==
=== Regular season upsets ===
This section lists unranked teams defeating AFCA Coaches poll-ranked teams during the season.

Date	Visiting team	Home team	Site	Result	Attendance	Ref.
August 28	No. 22 Central Missouri	Delta State	McCool Stadium • Cleveland, Mississippi	23–31	2,567	
August 28	No. 16 Bemidji State	Michigan Tech	Sherman Field • Houghton, Michigan	17–37	1,976	
August 30	No. 5 Central Oklahoma	UT Permian Basin	Astound Broadband Stadium • Midland, Texas	14–34	3,523	
September 4	Fort Hays State	No. 5 CSU Pueblo	ThunderBowl • Pueblo, Colorado	36–35	5,559	
September 4	No. 15 Ouachita Baptist	East Central	Norris Field at Koi Ishto Stadium • Ada, Oklahoma	22–24	2,438	
September 6	No. 11 Valdosta State	Johnson C. Smith	Irwin Belk Complex • Charlotte, North Carolina	16–28	1,867	
September 6	No. 17 UIndy	Findlay	Donnell Stadium • Findlay, Ohio	35–38	2,722	
September 13	No. 13 Virginia Union	Edward Waters	Nathaniel Glover Community Field & Stadium • Jacksonville, Florida	38–41	1,489	
September 13	No. 16 Delta State	UNC Pembroke	Grace P. Johnson Stadium • Pembroke, North Carolina	21–25	4,719	
September 13	No. 20 Ashland	UIndy	Key Stadium • Indianapolis, Indiana	26–33	3,786	
September 13	No. 23 Carson–Newman	Mars Hill	Meares Stadium • Mars Hill, North Carolina	24–31 ^{OT}	2,750	
September 20	No. 19 Lenoir–Rhyne	Carson–Newman	Burke–Tarr Stadium • Jefferson City, Tennessee	7–24	4,283	
September 20	Upper Iowa	No. 24 Michigan Tech	Sherman Field • Houghton, Michigan	21–14	2,791	
September 27	Carson–Newman	No. 19 Wingate	Irwin Belk Stadium • Wingate, North Carolina	21–14	2,257	
September 27	No. 15 Central Oklahoma	Northwest Missouri State	Bearcat Stadium • Maryville, Missouri	16–38	5,508	
September 27	UNC Pembroke	No. 20 Valdosta State	Bazemore–Hyder Stadium • Valdosta, Georgia	31–0	3,506	
September 27	Southern Arkansas	No. 24 Henderson State	Carpenter–Haygood Stadium • Arkadelphia, Arkansas	24–21	4,619	
October 4	Seton Hill	No. 6 California (PA)	Adamson Stadium • California, Pennsylvania	16–7	1,703	
October 4	No. 14 Slippery Rock	Gannon	McConnell Family Stadium • Erie, Pennsylvania	35–38	813	
October 4	No. 22 Carson–Newman	Emory & Henry	Fred Selfe Stadium • Emory, Virginia	13–19	3,187	
October 11	No. 10 Minnesota Duluth	Northern State	Dacotah Bank Stadium • Aberdeen, South Dakota	31–34	5,077	
October 11	No. 12 Angelo State	Texas A&M–Kingsville	Javelina Stadium • Kingsville, Texas	19–24	5,600	
October 11	No. 16 California (PA)	Edinboro	Sox Harrison Stadium • Edinboro, Pennsylvania	29–35	3,478	
October 11	Glenville State	No. 21 Frostburg State	Bobcat Stadium • Frostburg, Maryland	19–13 ^{2OT}	730	
October 18	Saginaw Valley State	No. 7 Grand Valley State	Lubbers Stadium • Allendale, Michigan (Battle of the Valleys)	20–19	9,814	
October 18	No. 13 UT Permian Basin	Western Oregon	McArthur Field • Monmouth, Oregon	28–31	1,397	
October 18	No. 20 UNC Pembroke	North Greenville	Younts Stadium • Tigerville, South Carolina	7–20	3,000	
October 25	No. 9 Minnesota State	Wayne State (NE)	Memorial Stadium • Wayne, Nebraska	20–35	1,100	
October 25	Albany State	No. 21 Benedict	Charlie W. Johnson Stadium • Columbia, South Carolina	31–3	1,498	
October 25	No. 25 Southern Arkansas	Ouachita Baptist	Cliff Harris Stadium • Arkadelphia, Arkansas	14–42	2,875	
November 1	No. 21 West Alabama	Valdosta State	Bazemore–Hyder Stadium • Valdosta, Georgia	35–45	2,725	
November 1	No. 24 Frostburg State	California (PA)	Adamson Stadium • California, Pennsylvania	26–31	1,227	
November 8	No. 11 Western Colorado	Chadron State	Elliott Field at Don Beebe Stadium • Chadron, Nebraska	24–27 ^{OT}	2,500	
November 8	Western Oregon (Note: They were ranked no. 21 in the D2football.com poll only.)	No. 22 Angelo State	LeGrand Sports Complex • San Angelo, Texas	31–7	3,467	
November 8	No. 20 Slippery Rock	Edinboro	Sox Harrison Stadium • Edinboro, Pennsylvania	8–38	1,000	
November 8	No. 21 Delta State	Valdosta State	Bazemore–Hyder Stadium • Valdosta, Georgia	23–27	2,678	
November 8	No. 24 Assumption	Bentley	Peter Yetten Football Stadium • Waltham, Massachusetts	17–20	2,243	
November 15	Valdosta State	No. 3 West Florida	Pen Air Field • Pensacola, Florida	47–44 ^{OT}	5,754	
November 15	Tiffin	No. 8 Findlay	Donnell Stadium • Findlay, Ohio	23–21	3,608	
November 15	No. 13 Augustana (SD)	Wayne State (NE)	Memorial Stadium • Wayne, Nebraska (Egg Bowl Game)	31–38	1,584	
November 15	Minnesota State–Moorhead	No. 14 Minnesota State	Blakeslee Stadium • Mankato, Minnesota	31–23	3,815	
November 15	No. 25 UNC Pembroke	North Greenville	Younts Stadium • Tigerville, South Carolina (Conference Carolinas Bowl)	20–34	2,500	
^{#}Rankings from AFCA Coaches poll released prior to the game.

=== Postseason upsets ===
This section lists unseeded teams defeating seeded teams during the playoffs. Seed rankings appears in parentheses.

Date	Visiting team	Home team	Site	Result	Attendance	Ref.
November 22	Assumption	(4) IUP	George P. Miller Stadium • Indiana, Pennsylvania (First round–Super region 1)	23–20	786	
November 22	No. 24 Frostburg State	No. 11 (2) Johnson C. Smith	Irwin Belk Complex • Charlotte, North Carolina (First round–Super region 1)	21–7	4,293	
November 22	California (PA)	No. 17 (3) Virginia Union	Hovey Field • Richmond, Virginia (First round–Super region 1)	27–24	2,118	
November 22	No. 23 Benedict	(4) Wingate	Irwin Belk Stadium • Wingate, North Carolina (First round–Super region 2)	25–24	1,878	
November 22	No. 21 Minnesota State	No. 12 (4) Findlay	Donnell Stadium • Findlay, Ohio (First round–Super region 3)	37–14	2,781	
November 22	No. 15 Western Colorado	No. 5 (2) Central Washington	Tomlinson Stadium • Ellensburg, Washington (First round–Super region 4)	27–20	1,598	
November 22	No. 10 UT Permian Basin	No. 4 (3) CSU Pueblo	ThunderBowl • Pueblo, Colorado (First round–Super region 4)	37–24	2,372	
November 29	No. 21 Minnesota State	No. 8 (3) UIndy	Key Stadium • Indianapolis, Indiana (Second round–Super region 3)	35–27		
^{#}Rankings from AFCA Coaches poll released on November 17.

== Conference standings ==
=== Super Region 1 ===
2025 Central Intercollegiate Athletic Association football standings
	Conf.			Overall
Team	W		L	W		L
No. 18 Johnson C. Smith y$^	7	–	1	10	–	2
No. 21 Virginia Union y^	7	–	1	10	–	2
Fayetteville State	6	–	1	6	–	4
Virginia State	4	–	3	6	–	4
Elizabeth City State	4	–	3	4	–	6
Livingstone	3	–	4	5	–	5
Winston-Salem State	2	–	5	4	–	6
Bluefield State	2	–	5	3	–	7
Bowie State	2	–	5	3	–	7
Shaw	2	–	5	2	–	8
Lincoln (PA)	0	–	7	0	–	10
Championship: Johnson C. Smith 45, Virginia Union 21
$ – Conference champion; y – Championship game participant; ^ – NCAA Division II playoff participant; Rankings from AFCA poll

2025 Mountain East Conference football standings
	Conf.			Overall
Team	W		L	W		L
No. 14 Frostburg State +^	7	–	1	10	–	2
Charleston (WV) +	7	–	1	8	–	3
Glenville State	5	–	3	6	–	5
Wheeling	5	–	3	6	–	5
West Virginia State	4	–	4	5	–	6
Fairmont State	3	–	5	6	–	5
West Liberty	3	–	5	3	–	8
Concord	2	–	6	4	–	7
West Virginia Wesleyan	0	–	8	0	–	11
+ – Conference co-champions; ^ – NCAA Division II playoff participant; Rankings from AFCA poll

2025 Northeast-10 Conference football standings
	Conf.			Overall
Team	W		L	W		L
No. 24 Assumption +^	6	–	1	9	–	3
Bentley +^	6	–	1	7	–	4
Franklin Pierce	5	–	2	6	–	4
Saint Anselm	4	–	3	5	–	5
Southern Connecticut	4	–	3	4	–	6
American International	2	–	5	2	–	8
Post	1	–	6	4	–	6
Pace	0	–	7	0	–	11
+ – Conference co-champions; ^ – NCAA Division II playoff participant; Rankings from AFCA poll

2025 Pennsylvania State Athletic Conference football standings
	Conf.			Overall
Team	W		L	W		L
East Division
No. 3 Kutztown xy$^	7	–	0	14	–	1
Shepherd	6	–	1	7	–	4
East Stroudsburg	5	–	2	8	–	3
Lock Haven	4	–	3	6	–	5
Shippensburg	3	–	4	3	–	8
West Chester	2	–	5	4	–	7
Bloomsburg	1	–	6	3	–	8
Millersville	0	–	7	0	–	11
West Division
IUP xy^	5	–	1	7	–	4
Edinboro x	5	–	1	7	–	4
No. 22 California (PA) ^	3	–	3	9	–	4
Slippery Rock	3	–	3	6	–	4
Clarion	2	–	4	6	–	5
Seton Hill	2	–	4	4	–	7
Gannon	1	–	5	1	–	10
Championship: Kutztown 28, IUP 23
$ – Conference champion; x – Division champion/co-champions; y – Championship game participant; ^ – NCAA Division II playoff participant; Rankings from AFCA poll

=== Super Region 2 ===
2025 Conference Carolinas football standings
	Conf.			Overall
Team	W		L	W		L
North Greenville y$^	6	–	0	7	–	5
UNC Pembroke y	5	–	1	8	–	3
Ferrum*	3	–	3	4	–	7
Barton	3	–	3	3	–	8
Chowan	2	–	4	4	–	7
Shorter	1	–	5	2	–	9
Erskine	1	–	5	1	–	10
Championship: North Greenville 34, UNC Pembroke 20
$ – Conference champion; y – Championship game participant; ^ – NCAA Division II playoff participant; * – Ferrum ineligible for postseason play due to transition from NCAA Division III; Rankings from AFCA poll

2025 Gulf South Conference football standings
	Conf.			Overall
Team	W		L	W		L
No. 9 West Florida +^	2	–	1	10	–	2
Valdosta State +^	2	–	1	6	–	5
Delta State	1	–	2	7	–	3
West Alabama	0	–	3	5	–	4
+ – Conference co-champions; ^ – NCAA Division II playoff participant; Rankings from AFCA poll

2025 South Atlantic Conference football standings
	Conf.			Overall
Team	W		L	W		L
No. 4 Newberry $^	8	–	1	12	–	2
Wingate ^	7	–	2	9	–	3
Emory & Henry	6	–	3	8	–	3
Carson–Newman	6	–	3	7	–	3
Catawba	5	–	4	7	–	4
Lenoir–Rhyne	5	–	4	6	–	5
Mars Hill	4	–	5	5	–	6
Anderson (SC)	3	–	6	5	–	6
UVA Wise	1	–	8	1	–	9
Tusculum	0	–	9	1	–	9
$ – Conference champion; ^ – NCAA Division II playoff participant; Rankings from AFCA poll

2025 Southern Intercollegiate Athletic Conference football standings
	Conf.			Overall
Team	W		L	W		L
No. 7 Albany State y$^	8	–	0	12	–	2
No. 20 Benedict y^	7	–	1	10	–	3
Kentucky State ^	7	–	1	9	–	3
Allen	5	–	3	6	–	5
Edward Waters	4	–	4	5	–	5
Fort Valley State	4	–	4	4	–	6
Savannah State	3	–	5	4	–	6
Tuskegee	3	–	5	4	–	7
Morehouse	3	–	5	3	–	7
Central State (OH)	3	–	5	3	–	7
Miles	3	–	5	3	–	8
Clark Atlanta	2	–	6	3	–	7
Lane	0	–	8	0	–	10
Championship: Albany State 22, Benedict 16
$ – Conference champion; y – Championship game participant; ^ – NCAA Division II playoff participant; Rankings from AFCA poll

=== Super Region 3 ===
2025 Great Lakes Intercollegiate Athletic Conference football standings
	Conf.			Overall
Team	W		L	W		L
No. 1 Ferris State $^	7	–	0	16	–	0
Grand Valley State	5	–	2	7	–	3
Saginaw Valley State	5	–	2	6	–	5
Michigan Tech	4	–	3	7	–	4
Davenport	4	–	3	5	–	5
Northern Michigan	2	–	5	3	–	8
Roosevelt*	1	–	6	2	–	8
Wayne State (MI)	0	–	7	0	–	11
$ – Conference champion; ^ – NCAA Division II playoff participant; * – Roosevelt ineligible for postseason play due to transition from NAIA; Rankings from AFCA poll

2025 Great Lakes Valley Conference football standings
	Conf.			Overall
Team	W		L	W		L
No. 10 Indianapolis $^	8	–	0	11	–	2
Truman ^	7	–	1	8	–	4
Upper Iowa #	6	–	2	9	–	3
Missouri S&T	4	–	4	6	–	5
Quincy	4	–	4	6	–	5
McKendree	4	–	4	4	–	7
Southwest Baptist	2	–	6	3	–	7
William Jewell	1	–	7	3	–	8
Lincoln (MO)	0	–	8	2	–	9
$ – Conference champion; ^ – NCAA Division II playoff participant; # – Albanese Candy Bowl participant; Rankings from AFCA poll

2025 Great Midwest Athletic Conference football standings
	Conf.			Overall
Team	W		L	W		L
No. 19 Findlay +^	8	–	1	10	–	2
No. 15 Ashland +^	8	–	1	10	–	3
Northwood ^	7	–	2	9	–	3
Tiffin	6	–	3	7	–	4
Hillsdale #	5	–	4	6	–	6
Walsh	4	–	5	6	–	5
Ohio Dominican	4	–	5	5	–	5
Lake Erie	2	–	7	2	–	9
Thomas More	1	–	8	1	–	10
Kentucky Wesleyan	0	–	9	0	–	11
+ – Conference co-champions; ^ – NCAA Division II playoff participant; # – Albanese Candy Bowl participant; Rankings from AFCA poll

2025 Northern Sun Intercollegiate Conference football standings
	Conf.			Overall
Team	W		L	W		L
North
No. 16 Minnesota Duluth x$^	9	–	1	10	–	2
MSU Moorhead	7	–	3	8	–	3
Northern State	6	–	4	7	–	4
Bemidji State	4	–	6	4	–	7
Mary	3	–	7	4	–	7
Minot State	3	–	7	3	–	8
Jamestown*	1	–	9	1	–	9
South
No. 25 Augustana (SD)	8	–	2	9	–	2
No. 8 Minnesota State x^	7	–	3	10	–	4
Wayne State (NE) x	7	–	3	7	–	4
Sioux Falls	6	–	4	7	–	4
Winona State	6	–	4	6	–	5
Concordia–St. Paul	2	–	8	2	–	9
SW Minnesota State	1	–	9	1	–	10
$ – Conference champion; x – Division champion/co-champions; ^ – NCAA Division II playoff participant; * – Jamestown ineligible for postseason play due to transition from NAIA; Rankings from AFCA poll

=== Super Region 4 ===
2025 Great American Conference football standings
	Conf.			Overall
Team	W		L	W		L
No. 2 Harding $^	11	–	0	15	–	1
Southern Arkansas	8	–	3	8	–	3
Henderson State	8	–	3	8	–	3
Ouachita Baptist	7	–	4	7	–	4
Arkansas Tech #	7	–	4	7	–	5
East Central #	6	–	5	6	–	6
SW Oklahoma State	6	–	5	6	–	5
SE Oklahoma State	5	–	6	5	–	6
Arkansas–Monticello	2	–	9	2	–	9
Oklahoma Baptist	2	–	9	2	–	9
NW Oklahoma State	2	–	9	2	–	9
Southern Nazarene	2	–	9	2	–	9
$ – Conference champion; ^ – NCAA Division II playoff participant; # – bowl participant (Arkansas Tech: Heritage Bowl, East Central: First Americans Bowl); Rankings from AFCA poll

2025 Lone Star Conference football standings
	Conf.			Overall
Team	W		L	W		L
No. 13 Central Washington $^	9	–	0	10	–	2
No. 5 UT Permian Basin ^	7	–	2	11	–	3
Western Oregon	7	–	2	8	–	3
West Texas A&M #	7	–	2	8	–	4
Angelo State	4	–	5	6	–	5
Texas A&M–Kingsville	4	–	5	5	–	6
Eastern New Mexico	3	–	6	3	–	8
Midwestern State	3	–	6	3	–	8
Western New Mexico	1	–	8	2	–	9
Sul Ross *	0	–	9	0	–	11
$ – Conference champion; ^ – NCAA Division II playoff participant; # – Heritage Bowl participant * – Ineligible for postseason play due to transition from NCAA Division III; Rankings from AFCA poll

2025 Mid-America Intercollegiate Athletics Association football standings
	Conf.			Overall
Team	W		L	W		L
No. 6 Pittsburg State +^	8	–	1	10	–	3
No. 17 NW Missouri State +^	8	–	1	9	–	3
Central Oklahoma	6	–	3	6	–	5
Fort Hays State	5	–	4	6	–	5
Central Missouri	5	–	4	5	–	6
Nebraska–Kearney	4	–	5	6	–	5
Emporia State	4	–	5	5	–	6
Missouri Western	2	–	7	3	–	8
Washburn	2	–	7	3	–	8
Missouri Southern	1	–	8	3	–	8
+ – Conference co-champions; ^ – NCAA Division II playoff participant; Rankings from AFCA Poll

2025 Rocky Mountain Athletic Conference football standings
	Conf.			Overall
Team	W		L	W		L
No. 11 CSU Pueblo $^	9	–	0	10	–	2
No. 23 Chadron State ^	8	–	1	8	–	4
No. 12 Western Colorado ^	7	–	2	10	–	3
Colorado Mines	5	–	4	7	–	4
Colorado Mesa	5	–	4	6	–	5
New Mexico Highlands	4	–	5	6	–	5
Black Hills State	3	–	6	3	–	8
South Dakota Mines	3	–	6	3	–	8
Fort Lewis	1	–	8	2	–	9
Adams State	0	–	9	0	–	11
$ – Conference champion; ^ – NCAA Division II playoff participant; Rankings from AFCA poll

2025 NCAA Division II independents football records
	Conf.			Overall
Team	W		L	W		L
Northeastern State #		–		9	–	3
# – First Americans Bowl participant

== Postseason ==
=== Automatic bids (16) ===
Automatic bids
Super Region	Conference	School	Record	Appearance	Last
Super Region 1	CIAA	Johnson C. Smith	10–1	1st	—
Super Region 1	Mountain East	Frostburg State	9–2	1st	—
Super Region 1	Northeast-10	Bentley	7–3	4th	2021
Super Region 1	PSAC	Kutztown	11–0	8th	2024
Super Region 2	Carolinas	North Greenville	7–4	3rd	2016
Super Region 2	Gulf South	Valdosta State	6–4	21st	2024
Super Region 2	South Atlantic	Newberry	9–1	6th	2021
Super Region 2	SIAC	Albany State	10–1	15th	2021
Super Region 3	GLIAC	Ferris State	11–0	16th	2024
Super Region 3	GLVC	Indianapolis	10–1	10th	2024
Super Region 3	Great Midwest	Findlay	10–1	3rd	2021
Super Region 3	Northern Sun	Minnesota Duluth	10–1	13th	2021
Super Region 4	Great American	Harding	11–0	8th	2024
Super Region 4	Lone Star	Central Washington	10–1	9th	2024
Super Region 4	MIAA	Pittsburg State	9–2	22nd	2024
Super Region 4	Rocky Mountain	CSU Pueblo	10–1	11th	2024

=== At-large bids (16) ===
At-large bids
Super Region	School	Conference	Record	Appearance	Last
Super Region 1	Virginia Union	CIAA	10–1	13th	2024
Super Region 1	IUP	PSAC	7–3	20th	2022
Super Region 1	Assumption	Northeast-10	8–2	5th	2022
Super Region 1	California (PA)	PSAC	8–3	9th	2024
Super Region 2	West Florida	Gulf South	9–1	6th	2023
Super Region 2	Wingate	South Atlantic	9–2	7th	2024
Super Region 2	Benedict	SIAC	9–2	3rd	2023
Super Region 2	Kentucky State	SIAC	9–2	1st	—
Super Region 3	Ashland	Great Midwest	9–2	10th	2024
Super Region 3	Truman	GLVC	8–3	5th	1994
Super Region 3	Minnesota State	Northern Sun	8–3	16th	2024
Super Region 3	Northwood	Great Midwest	9–2	5th	2006
Super Region 4	Chadron State	Rocky Mountain	8–3	9th	2012
Super Region 4	UT Permian Basin	Lone Star	9–2	2nd	2023
Super Region 4	Western Colorado	Rocky Mountain	9–2	7th	2024
Super Region 4	Northwest Missouri State	MIAA	9–2	27th	2022

=== Bracket ===
Host team indicated either by higher seed or * where applicable.

==== Super Region 1 ====
First Round; November 22, 2025; Campus sites
1	Kutztown	52
Bentley	0
4	IUP	20
Assumption	23
2	Johnson C. Smith	7
Frostburg State	21
3	Virginia Union	24
California (PA)	27

Second Round; November 29, 2025; Campus sites
1	Kutztown	56
Assumption	19
Frostburg State	23
*	California (PA)	21

Quarterfinals; December 6, 2025; Campus sites
1	Kutztown	51
Frostburg State	29

==== Super Region 2 ====
First Round; November 22, 2025; Campus sites
1	Albany State	35
Valdosta State	30
4	Wingate	24
Benedict	25
2	West Florida	43
North Greenville	19
3	Newberry	45
Kentucky State	24

Second Round; November 29, 2025; Campus sites
1	Albany State	14
Benedict	12
2	West Florida	17
3	Newberry	24

Quarterfinals; December 6, 2025; Campus sites
1	Albany State	24
3	Newberry	31

==== Super Region 3 ====
First Round; November 22, 2025; Campus sites
1	Ferris State	65
Northwood	14
4	Ashland	32
Minnesota Duluth	7
2	Findlay	14
Minnesota State	37
3	Indianapolis	57
Truman	14

Second Round; November 29, 2025; Campus sites
1	Ferris State	56
4	Ashland	24
Minnesota State	35
3	Indianapolis	27

Quarterfinals; December 6, 2025; Campus sites
1	Ferris State	52
Minnesota State	29

==== Super Region 4 ====
First Round; November 22, 2025; Campus sites
1	Harding	38
NW Missouri State	16
4	Pittsburg State	21
Chadron State	17
2	Central Washington	20
Western Colorado	27
3	CSU Pueblo	24
UT Permian Basin	37

Second Round; November 29, 2025; Campus sites
1	Harding	37
4	Pittsburg State	21
*	Western Colorado	15
UT Permian Basin (OT)	21

Quarterfinals; December 6, 2025; Campus sites
1	Harding	34
UT Permian Basin	28

==== Semifinals and championship ====
Teams were re-seeded prior to semifinals.

Semifinals; December 13, 2025; Hosted by higher seeded team
1	Ferris State	49
4	Newberry	17
2	Kutztown	27
3	Harding	49

Championship; December 20, 2025; McKinney, Texas
1	Ferris State	42
3	Harding	21

=== Bowl games ===
Three bowl games were held which featured teams that did not qualify for the postseason tournament. This was up from only two bowls in past season, with the addition of the First Americans Bowl.

Date	Visiting team	Home team	Site	Result	Attendance	Ref.
December 6	Arkansas Tech	West Texas A&M	Community National Bank & Trust Stadium • Corsicana, Texas (Heritage Bowl)	27–28	4,685	
December 6	Upper Iowa	Hillsdale	Brickyard Stadium • Hobart, Indiana (Albanese Candy Bowl)	37–28	382	
December 6	East Central	Northeastern State	Doc Wadley Stadium • Tahlequah, Oklahoma (First Americans Bowl)	21–56	4,977	
^{#}Rankings from AFCA Coaches poll released prior to the game.

== Coaching changes ==
=== Preseason and in-season ===
This is restricted to coaching changes that took place on or after May 1, 2025, and will include any changes announced after a team's last regularly scheduled games but before its playoff games.

School	Outgoing coach	Date	Reason	Replacement	Previous position
Seton Hill	Daniel Day	June 6, 2025	Resigned	Kevin May	Seton Hill defensive coordinator and linebackers coach (2019–2024)
Edward Waters	Toriano Morgan	July 16, 2025	Hired as co-offensive coordinator by Tennessee State	Brian Jenkins (interim; named full-time on September 19, 2025)	Edward Waters offensive coordinator and associate head coach (2019–2024)
Mars Hill	Tim Clifton	August 11, 2025	Retired	Kevin Barnette	Mars Hill defensive coordinator (1989–2024)
Millersville	J. C. Morgan	October 6, 2025	Fired	Brian Ferguson (interim)	Millersville offensive coordinator (2025)
Northern Michigan	Shane Richardson	November 7, 2025	Resigned	Billy Lindquist (interim)	Northern Michigan offensive coordinator and associate head coach (2023–2025)

=== End of season ===
This list includes coaching changes announced during the season that did not take effect until the end of the season.

School	Outgoing coach	Date	Reason	Replacement	Previous position
Arkansas–Monticello	Hud Jackson	November 9, 2025	Resigned (became school's athletic director, effective at season's end)	Gary Goff	McNeese head coach (2022–2024)
Winston-Salem State	Robert Massey	November 9, 2025	Fired	Tory Woodbury	Norfolk State special teams coordinator (2025)
West Liberty	Roger Waialae	November 10, 2025	Retired (effective at season's end)	Chad Salisbury	California (PA) offensive coordinator (2017–2025)
Shippensburg	Mark Maciejewski	November 10, 2025	Retired (effective at season's end)	Drew Gallardy	Shippensburg offensive coordinator and offensive line coach (2024–2025)
Savannah State	Aaron Kelton	November 14, 2025	Resigned	Thomas Howard	Fayetteville State defensive coordinator (2025)
Concordia–St. Paul	Shannon Currier	November 17, 2025	Fired	Joshua Schumacher	Saginaw Valley State special teams coordinator and linebackers coach (2025)
Eastern New Mexico	Kelley Lee	November 17, 2025	Fired	Art Briles	Guelfi Firenze head coach (2022–2025)
Glenville State	Mike Kellar	November 18, 2025	Contract not renewed	Jake Casteel	West Virginia defensive assistant (2025)
Northwestern Oklahoma State	Ronnie Jones	November 18, 2025	Fired	Jerry Partridge	UT Martin assistant head coach and defensive coordinator (2025)
West Virginia Wesleyan	Dwayne Martin	November 20, 2025	Fired	Mike Kellar	Glenville State head coach (2019–2025)
Bowie State	Kyle Jackson	November 21, 2025	Contract not renewed	Dawson Odums	Norfolk State head coach (2021–2024)
Saginaw Valley State	Ryan Brady	December 3, 2025	Fired	Michael Engle	Indianapolis offensive coordinator (2024–2025)
Morehouse	Terance Mathis	December 10, 2025	Fired	Brad Sherrod	Texas Wesleyan head coach (2024–2025)
Central Washington	Chris Fisk	December 12, 2025	Hired as head coach by Portland State	Scott Power	Wisconsin assistant defensive backs coach (2025)
Findlay	Kory Allen	December 14, 2025	Hired as assistant coach by Toledo	Tyler Johns	Gardner–Webb offensive coordinator (2024–2025)
Albany State	Quinn Gray	December 15, 2025	Hired as head coach by Florida A&M	David Bowser	Johnson C. Smith linebackers coach & director of player personnel (2023–2025)
Clark Atlanta	Teddy Keaton	December 16, 2025	Fired	Terry Sims	Alabama State assistant head coach and defensive run game coordinator (2024–2025)
UT Permian Basin	Kris McCullough	December 23, 2025	Hired as head coach by Gardner–Webb	Chris Softley	Lubbock Christian HS (TX) head coach (2016–2025)
Edinboro	Matthew Scott	December 29, 2025	Hired as defensive coordinator by Albany	Eric Crandall (interim)	Edinboro defensive coordinator (2025)
Carson–Newman	Ashley Ingram	December 30, 2025	Hired as head coach by VMI	Tyler Almond	Carson–Newman defensive coordinator and linebackers coach (2024–2025)
Northern Michigan	Billy Lindquist (interim)	January 5, 2026	Permanent replacement	Matt Janus	Wisconsin–La Crosse head coach (2020–2025)
Harding	Paul Simmons	January 6, 2026	Resigned (named as team's general manager)	Roddy Mote	Harding defensive coordinator & linebackers coach (2017–2025)
Millersville	Brian Ferguson (interim)	January 14, 2026	Permanent replacement	Drew Folmar	Bucknell offensive coordinator (2025)
Delta State	Todd Cooley	January 22, 2026	Hired as assistant by Ole Miss	David Dean	Lanier County HS (GA) head coach (2024–2025)
Wayne State (MI)	Tyrone Wheatley	February 10, 2026	Resigned	Terrence Isaac	Rochester C&T head coach (2022–2025)
Tiffin	Brett Ekkens	February 17, 2026	Hired as assistant by Arizona Cardinals	Zack Blair	Tiffin offensive coordinator and quarterbacks coach (2024–2025)

== See also ==
- 2025 NCAA Division I FBS football season
- 2025 NCAA Division I FCS football season
- 2025 NCAA Division III football season
- 2025 NAIA football season
- 2025 U Sports football season
