= Brian Ferguson =

Brian Ferguson may refer to:

- R. Brian Ferguson, American anthropologist
- Brian Ferguson (American football), American football coach

== See also ==
- Bryan M. Ferguson, Scottish filmmaker and music video director
