= Lynn Ullom =

American basketball coach

- Born: July 17, 1960 (age 66)
- Education: West Liberty University
- Occupation: Athletic Director

Lynn Ullom (born 17 July 1960) is the West Liberty University former women's basketball program head coach and currently its athletic program director in West Liberty, West Virginia.

== High school ==
Ullom competed on the basketball and track teams at Cameron High School in Cameron, West Virginia before graduating from Cameron in 1978.

== College ==
Ullom attended Waynesburg (Pa.) College immediately following high school for one year and then worked for two years before returning to college at West Liberty in 1982. He graduated from West Liberty with a B.A. in Social Science Education in 1985.

== Early career ==
After graduation, Ullom spent two years as a coach and substitute teacher at Cameron High School. He coached boys' basketball (Grades 7–9 and junior varsity) as an assistant coach under former West Liberty University men's basketball head coach Jim Crutchfield.

Ullom left Cameron in 1987 to accept a teaching job at Lakeland High School in Freeport, Ohio. He spent his first year at Lakeland as freshman boys' basketball coach before making the transition to girls' basketball as assistant head coach for the next two years. He also served as track head coach at Lakeland for one year.

Ullom moved into the college ranks in 1991 when he was hired as head women's basketball coach at West Liberty. Since the women's basketball job was only a part-time position at that time, he continued to teach at Lakeland High School for two more years while making the daily 50-mile drive to the West Liberty campus. This continued until 1993, when his role as head women's basketball coach at West Liberty was combined with the job of Sports Information Director to create a full-time position.

In addition to his coaching responsibilities, Ullom also served as associate athletic director at West Liberty from 2009–16 before his appointment as co-interim athletic director, along with head football coach Roger Waialae, for the 2015–16 academic year. Ullom stepped down as head women's basketball coach on 4 May 2017 when WLU President Dr. Stephen Greiner announced his appointment as the university's full-time athletic director.

== Coaching career ==
Ullom averaged more than 20 wins a season (534-252, .679) during his 26 years as head women's basketball coach at West Liberty. During the 2015-16 season, he became only the 14th coach in the history of NCAA Division II women's basketball to record 500 wins. When he stepped down, Ullom ranked among the top 15 NCAA Division II coaches of all time in career wins and winning percentage. Ullom's West Liberty teams posted 17 20-win seasons, won three West Virginia Intercollegiate Athletic Conference and two Mountain East Conference regular-season championships, five WVIAC and two MEC tournament championships and advanced to the conference tournament championship game on 14 different occasions. His Hilltoppers earned 14 NCAA Tournament bids, capped by a run to the 2016 NCAA Division II "Sweet 16" that included a regional tournament victory against defending national champion California (Pa.).

During Ullom's tenure, his teams set numerous school records, including wins in a season (29), consecutive wins (15) and points in a game (112) while claiming multiple NCAA team and individual statistical championships. His players also received extensive individual recognition, virtually rewriting the WLU record book and earning 52 first- or second-team All-Conference selections. Every women's basketball player who completed her playing career at West Liberty under Ullom has earned her degree.

A two-time WVIAC Coach of the Year recipient (1996, 2000) and the 2016 MEC Coach of the Year, Ullom was the first head coach of a women's sport to receive the West Virginia College Coach of the Year Award in 2001. He was also honored as the 2011 Region 2 Coach of the Year by the Women's Basketball Coaches Association (WBCA) and was a 2016 Victory Award Club recipient at the annual WBCA Convention in Indianapolis in recognition of his 500th career coaching win. Ullom passed former West Virginia University coach Kittie Blakemore as the all-time winningest collegiate women's basketball coach in the state of West Virginia during the 2006 season. Blakemore had 301 wins in 19 seasons with the Mountaineers. Ullom was inducted into the West Liberty University Hall of Fame in September 2010.

== Coaching record ==
Season	Team	Record	Notes
1991–92	West Liberty	12-16	
1992–93	West Liberty	11-18	
1993–94	West Liberty	18-9	WVIAC tournament semifinals
1994–95	West Liberty	17-13	WVIAC tournament finals
1995–96	West Liberty	22-8	WVIAC tournament finals
1996–97	West Liberty	23-6	WVIAC regular season/tournament champion; NCAA tournament
1997–98	West Liberty	16-13	WVIAC tournament semifinals
1998–99	West Liberty	19-11	WVIAC tournament champion; NCAA tournament
1999–00	West Liberty	23-7	WVIAC regular season/tournament champion; NCAA tournament
2000–01	West Liberty	25-5	WVIAC regular season/tournament champion; NCAA tournament
2001–02	West Liberty	27-4	WVIAC tournament finals; NCAA tournament
2002–03	West Liberty	24-8	WVIAC tournament finals; NCAA tournament
2003–04	West Liberty	26-5	WVIAC tournament champion; NCAA tournament
2004–05	West Liberty	13-14	WVIAC tournament semifinals
2005–06	West Liberty	24-7	WVIAC tournament semifinals; NCAA tournament
2006–07	West Liberty	21-10	WVIAC tournament finals
2007–08	West Liberty	24-6	NCAA tournament
2008–09	West Liberty	24-7	WVIAC tournament finals
2009–10	West Liberty	22-10	WVIAC tournament finals; NCAA tournament
2010–11	West Liberty	25-7	NCAA tournament
2011–12	West Liberty	15-15	
2012–13	West Liberty	21-8	WVIAC semifinals
2013–13	West Liberty	20-11	MEC semifinals; NCAA tournament
2014–15	West Liberty	24-9	MEC regular season/tournament champion; NCAA tournament
2015–16	West Liberty	29-5	MEC regular season champion; NCAA "Sweet 16"
2016–17	West Liberty	9-20	
Career	West Liberty	534-252 (.679)	

== Awards and honors ==
- 1996 West Virginia Conference Coach of the Year
- 2000 West Virginia Conference Coach of the Year
- 2001 West Virginia College Coach of the Year (W.Va. Sportswriters Association)
- Inducted into West Liberty University Hall of Fame in 2010
- 2011 WBCA Region 2 Coach of the Year (Women's Basketball Coaches Association)
- 2016 Mountain East Conference Coach of the Year
- 2016 WBCA Victory Award Club (Women's Basketball Coaches Association)
