= Gerard Wilcher =

American football coach (born c. 1969)

Current position
- Title: Special teams coordinator & defensive backs coach
- Team: Texas A&M–Kingsville
- Conference: LSC

Biographical details
- Born: c. November 1969 (age 56)
- Education: Morehouse College (1992); Boston College (1997)

Playing career
- 1988–1991: Morehouse
- Position: Defensive back

Coaching career (HC unless noted)
- 1992 (spring): Morehouse (SA)
- 1992–1993: Morehouse (RB)
- 1994: Morehouse (DB)
- 1995: Cheyney (DB)
- 1996: Boston College (GA)
- 1997: UMass (OLB)
- 1998–2000: UMass (WR)
- 2001–2003: Cornell (DB)
- 2004: Lehigh (DB)
- 2005: Lehigh (DC/DB)
- 2006–2011: Lehigh (DB)
- 2012–2013: Lehigh (co-DC/DB)
- 2014–2015: Seton Hill (DC/CB)
- 2016–2017: Delaware State (DC)
- 2018–2022: Rice (CB)
- 2023: Morehouse
- 2024: Western Michigan (off. analyst)
- 2025: Millersville (STC/DB)
- 2026–present: Texas A&M–Kingsville (STC/DB)

Head coaching record
- Overall: 1–9

Gerard Anthony Wilcher (born c. November 1969) is an American college football coach. He is the special teams coordinator and defensive backs coach for Texas A&M University–Kingsville, positions he has held since 2026. He was the head football coach for Morehouse College in 2023. He also coached for Cheyney, Boston College, UMass, Cornell, Lehigh, Seton Hill, Delaware State, Rice, Western Michigan, and Millersville. He played college football for Morehouse as a defensive back.

== Playing career ==
Wilcher played college football for Morehouse as a defensive back. He was most notably a member of the 1991 team, led by head coach Craig M. Cason, that finished tied for first in the Southern Intercollegiate Athletic Conference.

== Coaching career ==
After Wilcher's graduation, he returned to Morehouse as a student assistant in the spring before being named as running backs coach in the fall. He was retained for the 1994 season when Cason resigned and Vincent Williams, the team's defensive coordinator, was promoted. That same year he transitioned to defensive backs coach, replacing Keith Smyre. Wilcher spent the 1995 season as defensive backs coach for Cheyney before, in 1996, becoming a graduate assistant for Boston College. At Boston College, he worked closely with the defensive backs. After one season with the Eagles, he was hired as the outside linebackers coach for UMass under head coach Mike Hodges. He replaced Ben Albert. After one season, Wilcher transitioned to wide receivers coach.

After four seasons on the UMass staff, Wilcher was hired as the defensive backs coach for Cornell. In 2004, he accepted the same position at Lehigh. In 2005, he was promoted to defensive coordinator by head coach Pete Lembo. Wilcher took over a defense that regularly finished among the top team's in the Patriot League. In 2006, Lembo left and Andy Coen was hired, with him, he hired Dave Kotulski as his defensive coordinator, leaving Wilcher to revert to his former role of just defensive backs coach. In 2012, Kotulski left for Stanford, leading Coen to promoted Wilcher, alongside Donnie Roberts, to co-defensive coordinator.

In 2014, Wilcher was hired as the defensive coordinator for Seton Hill under head coach Isaac Collins. In 2016, he rejoined the Division I ranks as the defensive coordinator for Delaware State. After going a combined 2–20 in two seasons, Wilcher was hired as the cornerbacks coach for Rice.

In 2023, having spent the previous five seasons with Rice, Wilcher was hired as the head coach for his alma mater, Morehouse. He took over for Rich Freeman, who resigned after 16 seasons. He was hired after the recruiting season and later stated that he "had no recruiting budget." Wilcher made his head coaching debut against Virginia Union in the Black College Football Hall of Fame Classic, where they lost 45–13. Due to not being able to properly recruit, Morehouse finished the season going 1–9, with their lone win coming against conference rival Clark Atlanta, who finished winless at 0–10. Wilcher was fired after just one season, stating that Morehouse had "made the decision to no longer retain me rather than give us the support and resources we need..."

In 2024, Wilcher was hired as an offensive analyst for Western Michigan. In 2025, he returned to on-field coaching and joined J. C. Morgan as the special teams coordinator and defensive backs coach for Millersville. He took the same positions for Texas A&M–Kingsville in 2026.

== Head coaching record ==
Year	Team	Overall	Conference	Standing	Bowl/playoffs
Morehouse Maroon Tigers (Southern Intercollegiate Athletic Conference) (2023)
2023	Morehouse	1–9	1–7	T–11th	
Morehouse:		1–9	1–7		
Total:		1–9			
