= Matthew Scott (American football) =

American football coach (born c. 1986)

Current position
- Title: Defensive coordinator
- Team: Albany
- Conference: CAA

Biographical details
- Born: c. 1986 (age 39–40); Imperial, Pennsylvania, U.S.

Playing career
- 2004–2007: IUP
- Position: Nose tackle

Coaching career (HC unless noted)
- 2008: IUP (DL)
- 2009: New Haven (LB/S)
- 2010–2013: Albany (CB)
- 2014: Albany (STC/OLB)
- 2015–2016: Susquehanna (DC)
- 2017–2024: New Haven (DC/DB)
- 2025: Edinboro
- 2026–present: Albany (DC)

Head coaching record
- Overall: 7–4

Accomplishments and honors

Championships
- PSAC West Division (2025)

Awards
- PSAC West Division Coach of the Year (2025)

Matthew Scott (born c. 1985) is an American college football coach. He is the defensive coordinator for the University at Albany, SUNY, a position he has held since 2026. He was the head football coach for Pennsylvania Western University, Edinboro, in 2025.

== Playing career ==
Scott graduated from West Allegheny Senior High School in 2004 before becoming a four-year member of the IUP football team as a nose tackle.

== Coaching career ==
In 2008, Scott began his coaching career at his alma mater, IUP, as the team's defensive line coach. He then spent the 2009 season as the linebackers coach and safeties coach for New Haven. From 2010 to 2013, he served as the cornerbacks coach for Albany before being promoted to special teams coordinator and outside linebackers coach in 2014.

In 2015, Scott was hired as the defensive coordinator for Susquehanna under Tom Perkovich.

From 2017 to 2024, Scott returned to New Haven as the defensive coordinator and defensive backs coach. During his tenure, the Chargers amassed an overall record of 56–21, won two Northeast-10 Conference (NE-10) championships, and earned trips to the NCAA Division II playoffs four times.

In 2025, Scott was announced as the head football coach for Pennsylvania Western University, Edinboro. He succeeded the recently resigned Jake Nulph. After his inaugural season, Scott resigned. In his lone season with the team, he led the team to a 7–4 record, PSAC West Co-Champs, the team's best record since 2017. Scott was also selected as PSAC West Coach of the Year

Shortly after Scott resigned from Edinboro, he was announced as the defensive coordinator for Albany under recently hired head coach Perkovich, who Scott worked under at Susquehanna from 2015 to 2016.

== Head coaching record ==
Year	Team	Overall	Conference	Standing	Bowl/playoffs
Edinboro Fighting Scots (Pennsylvania State Athletic Conference) (2025)
2025	Edinboro	7–4	5–1	T–1st (West)	
Edinboro:		7–4	5–1		
Total:		7–4			
National championship Conference title Conference division title or championship game berth
