= Kevin May =

American college football coach

Current position
- Title: Head coach
- Team: Seton Hill
- Conference: PSAC
- Record: 5–9

Biographical details
- Education: Occidental College (2011)

Playing career
- 2008–2011: Occidental
- Positions: Safety, Outside linebacker

Coaching career (HC unless noted)
- 2012: Occidental (DA)
- 2013–2014: Wyoming (GA)
- 2015–2017: Texas A&M–Kingsville (LB)
- 2018: Texas A&M–Kingsville (ST/S)
- 2019–2024: Seton Hill (DC/LB)
- 2025–present: Seton Hill

Head coaching record
- Overall: 5–9

Kevin May is an American college football coach. He is the head football coach for Seton Hill University, a position he has held since 2025.

== Head coaching record ==
=== College ===
Year	Team	Overall	Conference	Standing	Bowl/playoffs
Seton Hill Griffins (Pennsylvania State Athletic Conference) (2025–present)
2025	Seton Hill	4–7	2–4	T–5th (West)	
2026	Seton Hill	1–2	1–1	(West)	
Seton Hill:		5–9	3–5		
Total:		5–9			
