= Dwayne Martin =

American football coach (born c. 1972)

Biographical details
- Born: c. 1972 (age 53–54); Akron, Ohio, U.S.
- Education: West Virginia Wesleyan College (1996)

Playing career
- 1991–1995: West Virginia Wesleyan
- Position: Defensive back

Coaching career (HC unless noted)
- 1996: West Virginia Tech (DB)
- 1997–1998: West Virginia Tech (DC)
- 1999: Wesley (DE) (RB)
- 2000–2001: Wesley (DE) (DB)
- 2002–2005: Slippery Rock (LB)
- 2006–2012: Clarion (DC)
- 2013–2014: Clarion (ST)
- 2015: Clarion (DC/DB)
- 2016–2018: West Virginia Wesleyan (DC/ST)
- 2019–2020: West Virginia Wesleyan (DC/ST/DB)
- 2021–2025: West Virginia Wesleyan

Head coaching record
- Overall: 1–53

Dwayne Martin (born c. 1972) is an American college football coach. He was the head football coach for West Virginia Wesleyan College from 2021 to 2025. He also coached for West Virginia Tech, Wesley (DE), Slippery Rock, and Clarion. He played college football for West Virginia Wesleyan as a defensive back.

== Head coaching record ==
Year	Team	Overall	Conference	Standing	Bowl/playoffs
West Virginia Wesleyan Bobcats (Mountain East Conference) (2021–2025)
2021	West Virginia Wesleyan	0–11	0–10	12th	
2022	West Virginia Wesleyan	1–10	1–9	11th	
2023	West Virginia Wesleyan	0–10	0–9	11th	
2024	West Virginia Wesleyan	0–11	0–9	10th	
2025	West Virginia Wesleyan	0–11	0–8	9th	
West Virginia Wesleyan:		1–53	1–45		
Total:		1–53			
