= Kyle Jackson (American football) =

American football coach (born 1989)

Biographical details
- Born: May 25, 1989 (age 37); Baltimore, Maryland, U.S.
- Education: Bowie State University (2011)

Playing career
- 2007–2010: Bowie State
- Position: Linebacker

Coaching career (HC unless noted)
- 2011–2013: Bowie State (LB/TE)
- 2015: Emporia State (DE)
- 2017–2021: Bowie State (LB)
- 2022: Bowie State (DC)
- 2022: Bowie State (interim HC)
- 2023–2025: Bowie State

Head coaching record
- Overall: 19–21

Kyle Jackson (born 25 May 1989) is an American college football coach. He is the head football coach for Bowie State University, a position he held on an interim basis in 2022 and full-time since 2023. He previously coached for Emporia State. He played college football for Bowie State as a linebacker.

== Head coaching record ==
Year	Team	Overall	Conference	Standing	Bowl/playoffs
Bowie State Bulldogs (Central Intercollegiate Athletic Association) (2022–2025)
2022	Bowie State	6–4	5–3	T–3rd (Northern)	
2023	Bowie State	6–4	5–3	3rd (Northern)	
2024	Bowie State	4–6	3–4	T–7th	
2025	Bowie State	3–7	2–5	T–7th	
Bowie State:		19–21	15–15		
Total:		19–21			
