= Mary Jane Shultz =

American chemist

- Born: February 23, 1948 (age 78)
- Education: University of Wisconsin, Madison (BS); Massachusetts Institute of Technology (PhD)
- Scientific career
- Fields: Chemical Physics, Surface Chemistry, Environmental Chemistry, Material Chemistry
- Workplaces: Tufts University
- Doctoral advisor: Robert J. Silbey
- Other academic advisors: Nicolaas Bloembergen (postdoctoral)
- Website: https://sites.tufts.edu/shultzresearchlab/

Mary Jane Shultz is an American professor and researcher in physical, environmental, materials and surface chemistry at Tufts University. Since 2013, she is also a visiting professor at the Chinese Academy of Sciences.

== Early life and education ==
Shultz was born in Cosmos, Minnesota, on February 23, 1948. Since nearly dying during her childhood due to unclean water, she has always been passionate about clean water, and has been researching surface chemistry methods that purify water.

She studied at the University of Wisconsin-Madison, where she did research on physical chemistry and spectroscopy, receiving a Bachelor of Science with Honors in Chemistry in 1970. She was a graduate student at the Massachusetts Institute of Technology in Robert Silbey's laboratory investigating vibronic coupling in molecules and solids. Her PhD thesis established analytical models of the Jahn-Teller Effect between a strongly-coupled triply degenerate electronic state and a triply degenerate vibrational state strong coupling system.

== Career ==
From 1977-78, she worked as a research associate and lecturer at Boston College. Then, she did research at Harvard University under Dr. Nicolaas Bloembergen as a post-doctoral scholar and later as a visiting faculty member on vibrational energy flow. During her time there, she was also a Radcliffe Fellow.

In 1979, she began as an assistant professor at Tufts University. She was promoted to associate professor in 1985, and professor in 1999, where she currently maintains the Laboratory for Water and Surface Studies in the chemistry department. From 2000-2006, she served as the department chair.

In 2009, she was one of six academics to represent the United States at the Chemical Sciences and Society summit. She contributed to the white paper "Powering the World with Sunlight," which evaluates the role of chemistry in developing solar power for the world.

== Research ==
=== Instrumentation ===
The Shultz group invented a nonlinear interferometer that uses infrared and visible frequencies to generate a complex sum frequency signal. The two inputs (infrared and visible) are split and simultaneously focused onto a sample and a reference producing an interference that sensitively reports on the sample components.

The nonlinear interferometer is used by Shultz's lab to detect small changes in interfacial dynamics produced by material reactions. It has the potential to extend into other areas of surface chemistry research and provides a complement to scalar sum frequency generation.

=== Ice ===
As a part of a Multidisciplinary University Research Initiative, the Shultz lab also creates models to study ice crystallization processes. They use the nonlinear interferometer and Coherent Anti-Stokes Raman Spectroscopy (CARS) to understand the interaction of molecules at the ice-water interface. Currently, they are in the process of developing a new technology called Phase-Sensitive Reflection Coherent Anti-Stokes Raman Spectroscopy (PSR-CARS) that will aid in this project.

=== Ammonia ===
The Shultz group has a third project researching the interactions between ammonia and aqueous solutions and ice, in order to reduce the formation of cloud condensation nuclei by atmospheric ammonia and enable the efficient storage of ammonia fertilizer in soils.

=== Notable publications ===
1. Shultz, M. J.; "Crystal growth in ice and snow" Physics Today 2018.
2. Wang, J.; Bisson, P.; Marmolejos, J.; Shultz, M., "Nonlinear interferometer: Design, implementation, and phase-sensitive sum frequency measurement" J. Chem. Phys. 2017.
3. Shultz, M. J.; Silbey, R., "A Theoretical Study of the Strongly Coupled Txt Jahn-Teller System" J. Chem. Phys. 1976, 65, 4375.
4. Shultz, M. J.; Silbey, R., "The Txt Jahn-Teller Problem: Energy Levels for Large Coupling" J. Phys. C: Solid State Phys. 1974, 7, L325.
5. Black, J. G.; Kolodner, P.; Shultz, M. J.; Yablonovitch, E.; Bloembergen, N., "Collisionless Multiphoton Energy Deposition and Dissociation of SF6" Phys. Rev. 1979, A 19, 714.
6. Chen, Kuei-Hsien; Lu, Cheng-Zai; Aviles, Luis; Mazur, Eric; Bloembergen, Nicolaas; Shultz, Mary Jane, "Multiplex CARS Study of Infrared¬Multiphoton-Excited OCS" J. Chem. Phys 1989, 91, 1462.

== Awards and honors ==
- 2022: Chair, Gordon Research Conference on Water and Aqueous Solutions
- 2018: Vice Chair, Gordon Research Conference on Water and Aqueous Solutions
- 2013: Fellow, American Chemical Society
- 2011: Fellow, American Association for the Advancement of Science
- 2009: One of six US representatives to the International Congress: Chemical Sciences and Society, Kloster Seeon, Germany
