= Cosmos, Minnesota =

City in Minnesota, United States

- City
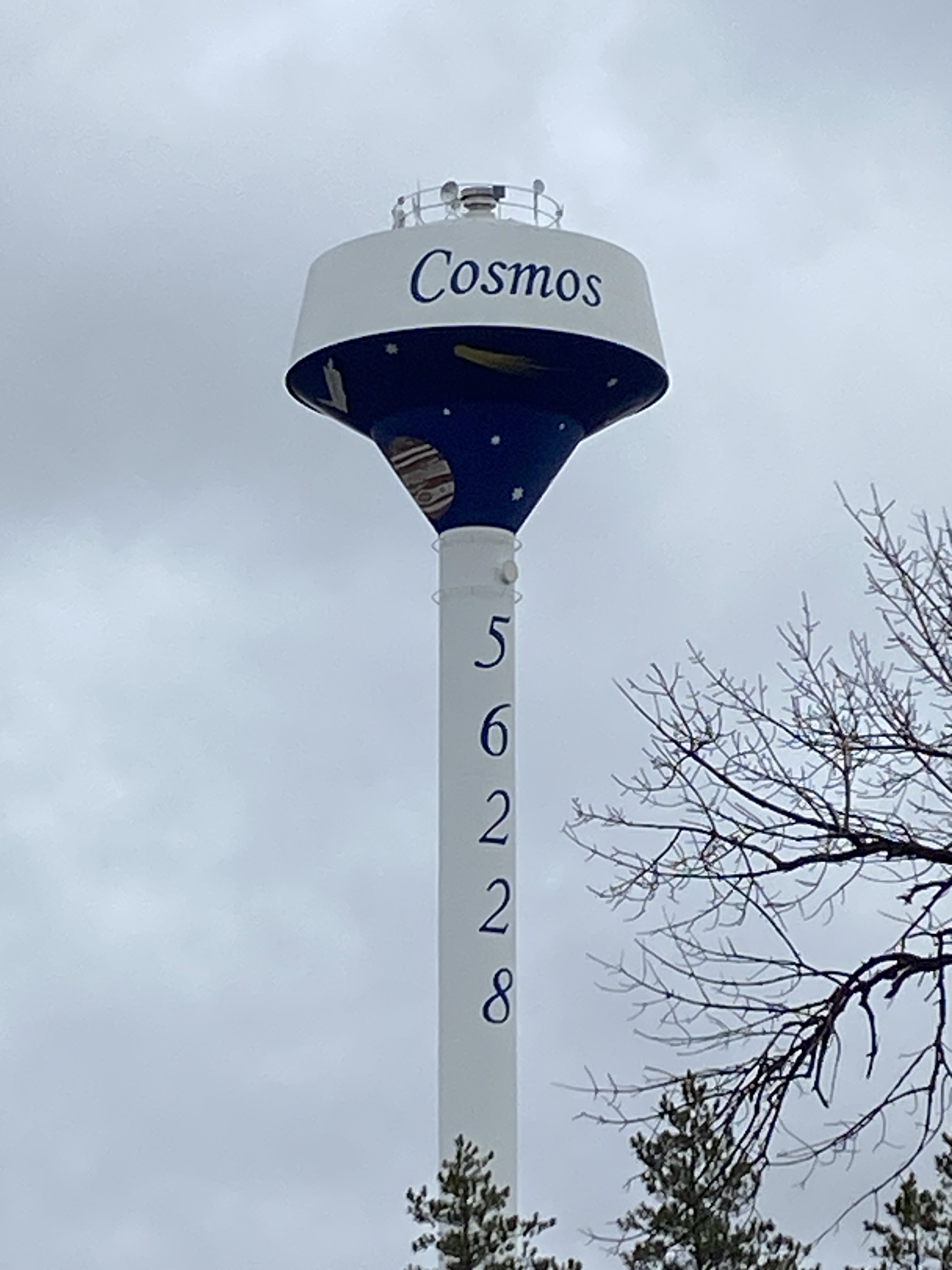
- Cosmos water tower

- Location in Meeker County and the state of Minnesota
- Coordinates: 44°56′10″N 94°41′44″W
- Country: United States
- State: Minnesota
- County: Meeker

Area
  - Total: 1.00 sq mi (2.59 km^{2})
  - Land: 0.98 sq mi (2.53 km^{2})
  - Water: 0.023 sq mi (0.06 km^{2})
- Elevation: 1,112 ft (339 m)

Population (2020)
  - Total: 507
  - Density: 520/sq mi (200.6/km^{2})
- Time zone: UTC-6 (Central (CST))
  - Summer (DST): UTC-5 (CDT)
- ZIP code: 56228
- Area code: 320
- FIPS code: 27-13420
- GNIS feature ID: 2393643
- Website: www.cosmos-mn.com

Cosmos is a city in Meeker County, Minnesota, United States, along the South Fork of the Crow River. The population was 507 at the 2020 census.

== History ==
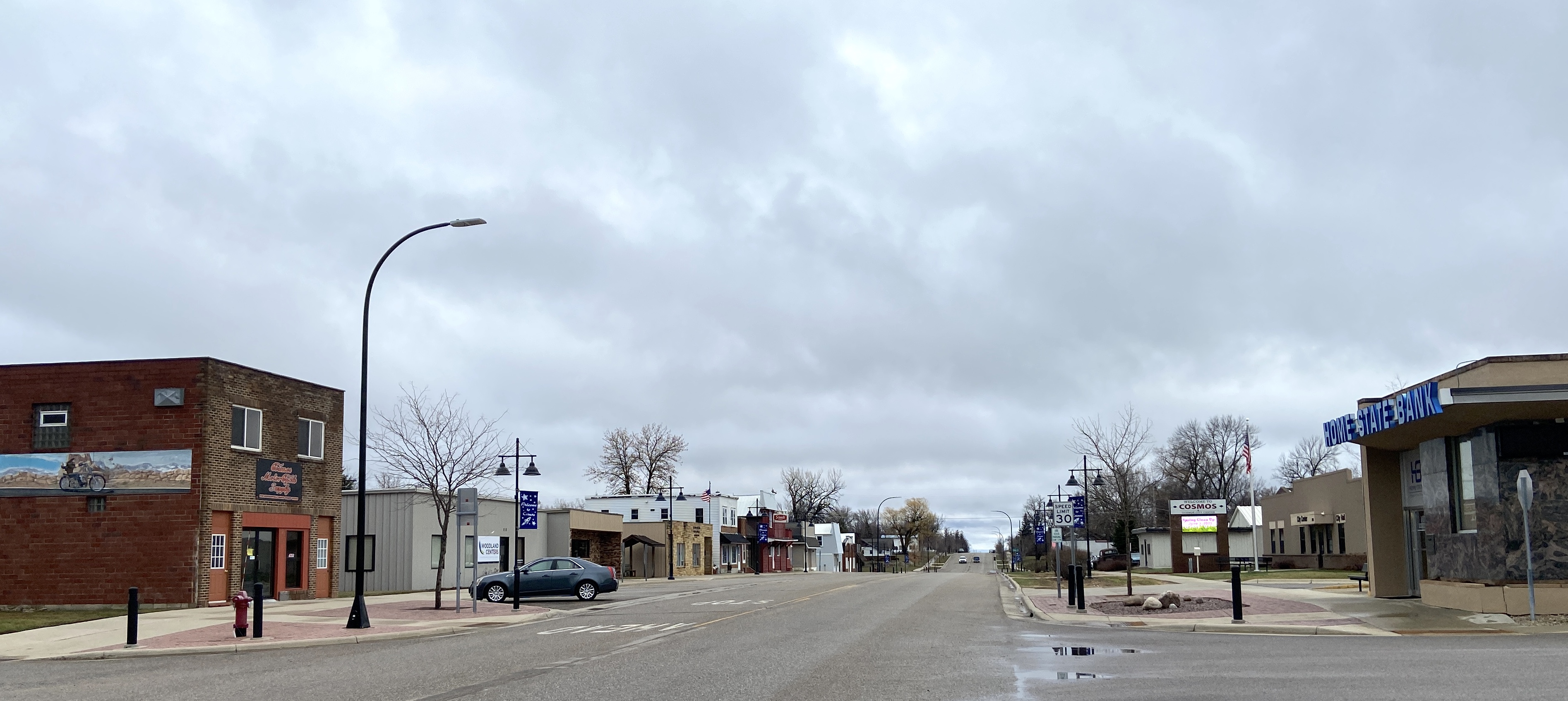
Business district

Cosmos Township was first settled by Daniel Jackman, from Maine, in 1867. On his arrival, until he could build his house, he lived in a tent and cooked on an open fire. He took up a homestead in section 26. He returned to Minneapolis the following spring, but immediately returned and built his home in the summer of 1868. In 1877, he made a trip to the Black Hills and spent the season in gold mining, but returned in the fall. When the township was organized, the first election was held at his house. He was elected the first chairman of the board of supervisors and held that office for three years.

Several others followed that first year, such as Civil War veteran Isaac L. Layton or Leighton from Maine, Hansom W. Young from New Brunswick, and Daniel S. Hoyt in 1867 as a surveyor from Massachusetts. The first two were the first farmers and they planted wheat. Originally, the town was called "Nelson" after Ole K. Nelson, from Norway, who was credited with bringing the first team of horses and plow and breaking the first soil. On January 25, 1870, the town and township were incorporated and its current name of Cosmos was proposed by surveyor and township clerk Daniel Hoyt. Cosmos is an ancient Greek word meaning order and harmony or "represents the university of created things and its synonym is harmony."

Cosmos remained small until rumors spread around 1910 that a railroad would be built. In 1922, the Luce Railroad (Minnesota Western) was constructed, and Cosmos continued to grow. On September 24, 1926, the present village plat was made and Cosmos became an incorporated village. Hoyt was elected the first township clerk. He froze to death in February 1870, trying to walk on foot to the Minnesota River. The city was incorporated as a village on September 21, 1926, and finally as a city in 1969. A post office was established as in Renville County in 1870, then to McLeod County in 1871, and finally it was transferred to Meeker County in 1872. Isaac Layton was the postmaster. The post office closed in 1906 and re-opened in 1924. The town had a railway station serving several rail lines, including the Minnesota Western. The town sits along the South Fork of the Crow River. Today the Luce Line Trail runs from Cosmos to Minneapolis.

While the town had been organized in 1870, it wasn't officially incorporated as a village until 1926.

== Geography ==
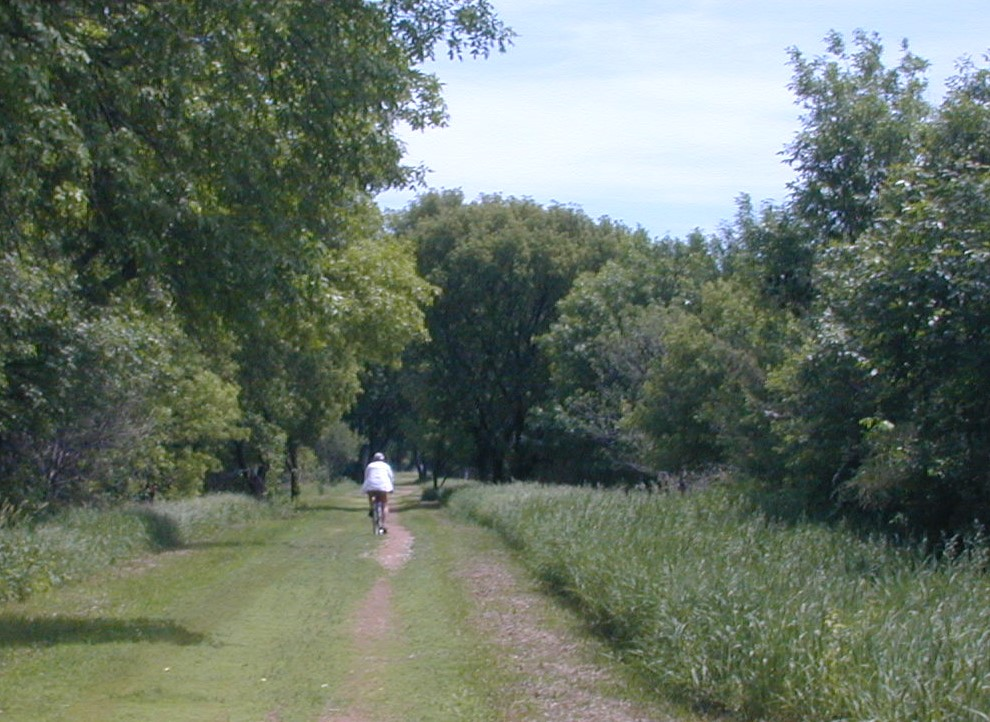
Cosmos is on the Luce Line Trail for walking and biking.

Cosmos is in southwestern Meeker County along the South Fork of the Crow River. The city of Cosmos sits at the center of Cosmos Township, but is a separate municipality. Minnesota State Highways 4 (Milky Way Street) and 7 (Astro Boulevard) are the two main routes in the town. The space theme extends to other streets which are named after planets or constellations. MN 4 leads north 15 miles (24 km) to Grove City and south 13 miles (21 km) to Hector, while MN 7 leads east-southeast 18 miles (29 km) to Hutchinson and west 33 miles (53 km) to Clara City.

According to the U.S. Census Bureau, the city of Cosmos has a total area of 1.00 square mile (2.59 km^{2}), of which 0.98 square miles (2.54 km^{2}) are land and 0.02 square miles (0.05 km^{2}), or 2.4%, are water. The South Fork of the Crow River passes through the southern end of the city, flowing easterly to eventually join the Crow River at Rockford and the Mississippi River at Dayton.

== Space Festival ==
On the third weekend in July, the city holds the Cosmos Space Festival. It features Minn-E-Rods, a softball tournament, a volleyball tournament, an antique tractor pull, meals in the park, pig races, a Space Festival parade, fireworks, a pancake breakfast, a pork chop dinner, church in the park, music entertainment, crafters, a pedal tractor pull, a disc golf tournament, laser tag, a bean bag tournament, citywide garage sales, drawings, and many other activities.

== Demographics ==
Historical population
Census	Pop.	Note	%±
1930	230		—
1940	357		55.2%
1950	382		7.0%
1960	487		27.5%
1970	570		17.0%
1980	571		0.2%
1990	610		6.8%
2000	582		−4.6%
2010	473		−18.7%
2020	507		7.2%
U.S. Decennial Census

=== 2010 census ===
As of the census of 2010, there were 473 people, 229 households, and 120 families residing in the city. The population density was 422.3 inhabitants per square mile (163.1/km^{2}). There were 261 housing units at an average density of 233.0 per square mile (90.0/km^{2}). The racial makeup of the city was 97.5% White, 0.2% African American, 0.2% Native American, 0.2% Pacific Islander, 1.5% from other races, and 0.4% from two or more races. Hispanic or Latino of any race were 1.7% of the population.

There were 229 households, of which 23.6% had children under the age of 18 living with them, 38.9% were married couples living together, 10.9% had a female householder with no husband present, 2.6% had a male householder with no wife present, and 47.6% were non-families. 38.0% of all households were made up of individuals, and 14.9% had someone living alone who was 65 years of age or older. The average household size was 2.07 and the average family size was 2.78.

The median age in the city was 45.2 years. 19.9% of residents were under the age of 18; 6.8% were between the ages of 18 and 24; 23.3% were from 25 to 44; 30.7% were from 45 to 64, and 19.5% were 65 years of age or older. The gender makeup of the city was 49.0% male and 51.0% female.

=== 2000 census ===
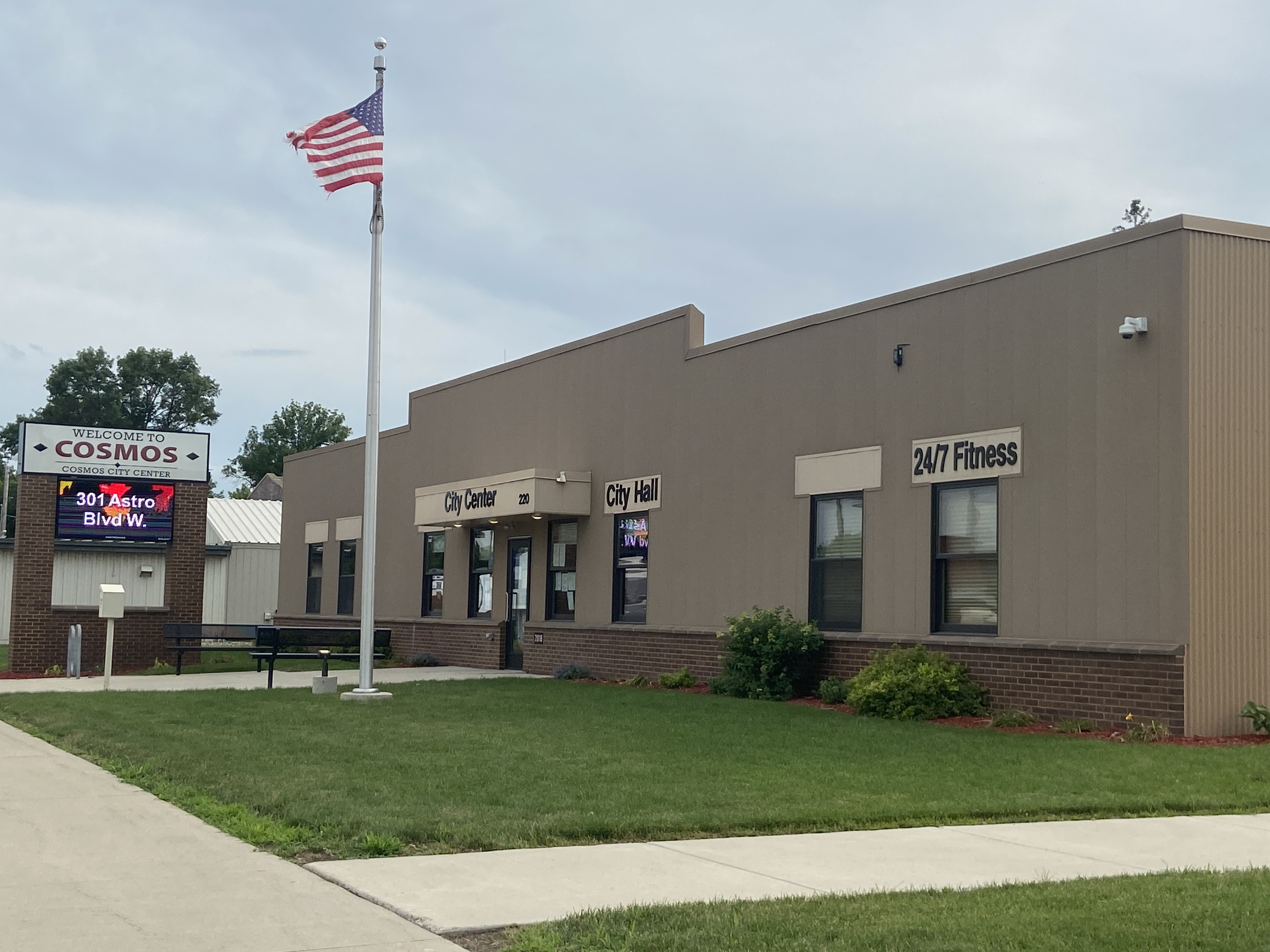
City Hall

As of the census of 2000, there were 582 people, 240 households, and 154 families residing in the city. The population density was 519.3 inhabitants per square mile (200.5/km^{2}). There were 261 housing units at an average density of 232.9 per square mile (89.9/km^{2}). The racial makeup of the city was 98.28% White. Four persons (0.69%) identified as Asian, one (0.17%) as Pacific Islander, two (0.34%) from other races, and three (0.52%) from two or more races. Two persons (0.34%) were Hispanic or Latino of any race.

There were 240 households, out of which 27.5% had children under the age of 18 living with them, 52.5% were married couples living together, 8.3% had a female householder with no husband present, and 35.8% were non-families. 28.8% of all households were made up of individuals, and 11.3% had someone living alone who was 65 years of age or older. The average household size was 2.26 and the average family size was 2.73.

In the city, the population was spread out, with 20.8% under the age of 18, 7.9% from 18 to 24, 26.8% from 25 to 44, 21.1% from 45 to 64, and 23.4% who were 65 years of age or older. The median age was 42 years. For every 100 females, there were 90.8 males. For every 100 females age 18 and over, there were 90.5 males.

The median income for a household in the city was $30,278, and the median income for a family was $36,750. Males had a median income of $31,364 versus $23,125 for females. The per capita income for the city was $15,447. About 5.8% of families and 10.0% of the population were below the poverty line, including 4.1% of those under age 18 and 22.0% of those age 65 or over.

== Notable people ==
- Mary Jane Shultz, professor and researcher in physical, environmental, materials and surface chemistry
- Shannon Currier, head football coach at Concordia Golden Bears.
