= Maurice Hunt =

American football coach (born 1943)

Biographical details
- Born: December 16, 1943 (age 82)

Coaching career (HC unless noted)
- ?–1976: Grinnell (DC)
- 1977–1978: Central State (OH)
- 1979–1989: Morehouse
- 1992–1994: Kentucky State
- 1995–1996: Morehouse
- 1997: Lane

Head coaching record
- Overall: 66–125–4

Maurice Hunt (born December 16, 1943) is an American former football coach. He served as the head football coach at Central State University (1977–1978), Kentucky State University (1992–1994), Morehouse College (1979–1989, 1995–1996), and Lane College (1997), compiling a career college football record of 66–125–4.

== Head coaching record ==
Year	Team	Overall	Conference	Standing	Bowl/playoffs
Central State Marauders (NCAA Division II independent) (1977–1978)
1977	Central State	5–6			
1978	Central State	2–9			
Central State:		7–15			
Morehouse Maroon Tigers (Southern Intercollegiate Athletic Conference) (1979–1989)
1979	Morehouse	6–3	4–1		
1980	Morehouse	2–7	2–3		
1981	Morehouse	3–7			
1982	Morehouse	5–5	3–4		
1983	Morehouse	6–4	2–3		
1984	Morehouse	5–4–1	3–3–1		
1985	Morehouse	3–6–1			
1986	Morehouse	5–5	3–4		
1987	Morehouse	4–6	3–4		
1988	Morehouse	4–7	2–5	6th	
1989	Morehouse	2–6–1	2–4	T–4th	
Kentucky State Thorobreds (NCAA Division II independent) (1992–1994)
1992	Kentucky State	4–7			
1993	Kentucky State	2–9			
1994	Kentucky State	1–9–1			
Kentucky State:		7–25–1			
Morehouse Maroon Tigers (Southern Intercollegiate Athletic Conference) (1995–1996)
1995	Morehouse	5–6	5–3	T–2nd	
1996	Morehouse	2–9	0–6	10th	
Morehouse:		52–75–3			
Lane Dragons (Southern Intercollegiate Athletic Conference) (1997)
1997	Lane	0–10			
Lane:		0–10			
Total:		66–125–4			
