= Daniel Day (American football) =

American football coach (born c. 1986)

Biographical details
- Born: c. 1986 (age 39–40)
- Education: Seton Hill University (2009, 2011)

Playing career
- 2005–2008: Seton Hill
- Position: Offensive lineman

Coaching career (HC unless noted)
- 2009–2010: Seton Hill (GA)
- 2011–2014: Saint Joseph's (IN) (AHC/ST/OL)
- 2015–2016: Saint Joseph's (IN)
- 2017: Benedictine (IL) (OC/OL)
- 2018: Warren Local HS (OH)
- 2019–2024: Seton Hill

Head coaching record
- Overall: 26–48 (college); 2–8 (high school)

Daniel Day (born c. 1986) is an American college football coach. He was most recently the head football coach for Seton Hill University from 2019 to 2024. He also was the head coach for the Saint Joseph's Pumas football team from 2015 to 2016 and the Warren Local High School football team in 2018. He also coached for Benedictine. He played college football for Seton Hill as an offensive lineman.

== Head coaching record ==
=== College ===
| Year | Team | Overall | Conference | Standing | Bowl/playoffs |
|---|---|---|---|---|---|
Saint Joseph's Pumas (Great Lakes Valley Conference) (2015–2016)
| 2015 | Saint Joseph's | 4–6 | 3–5 | T–6th | |
| 2016 | Saint Joseph's | 5–6 | 3–5 | T–6th | |
| Saint Joseph's: | | 9–12 | 6–10 | | |
Seton Hill Griffins (Pennsylvania State Athletic Conference) (2019–2024)
| 2019 | Seton Hill | 2–8 | 2–5 | 6th (West) | |
| 2020–21 | No team—COVID-19 | | | | |
| 2021 | Seton Hill | 5–6 | 2–5 | 7th (West) | |
| 2022 | Seton Hill | 2–9 | 2–5 | T–5th (West) | |
| 2023 | Seton Hill | 6–5 | 4–3 | 4th (West) | |
| 2024 | Seton Hill | 3–8 | 1–5 | T–6th (West) | |
| Seton Hill: | | 18–36 | 11–23 | | |
| Total: | | 27–48 | | | |

=== High school ===
| Year | Team | Overall | Conference | Standing | Bowl/playoffs |
|---|---|---|---|---|---|
Warren Local Warriors () (2018)
| 2018 | Warren Local | 2–8 | 0–0 | N/A | |
| Warren Local: | | 2–8 | 0–0 | | |
| Total: | | 2–8 | | | |
