= First Americans Bowl =

NCAA Division II football bowl game

- Stadium: Doc Wadley Stadium
- Location: Tahlequah, Oklahoma, U.S.
- Operated: 2025–present
- Conference tie-ins: none

Sponsors
- 7 Clans Talent Agency

The First Americans Bowl is an annual NCAA Division II college football bowl game held at Doc Wadley Stadium in Tahlequah, Oklahoma, on the campus of Northeastern State University. It is one of three Division II sanctioned bowl games, along with the Heritage Bowl and Albanese Candy Bowl.

The game, developed by 7 Clans Talent Agency, matches two institutions not qualifying for the NCAA Division II Football Championship playoffs that have "strong Native American connections." Beneficiaries include scholarship funds, youth sports, and other community programs for "indigenous and minority athletes." Founders of the bowl announced plans to make it "an annual celebration of culture, athletic excellence, and community impact." The creation of the bowl was first reported in the press on November 19, 2025, and in a release the following day by the institutions participating in the inaugural game: Northeastern State University and East Central University.

The pool of institutions fitting the game's mission as initially outlined by its primary sponsor was quite small. As of 2025, the list of Tribal Colleges and Universities (TCUs) included no football-playing Division II institutions, and the list of Native American-Serving Nontribal Institutions (NASNTIs) included just seven, five of which were in Oklahoma: Northeastern State, East Central, Southeastern Oklahoma State, Southwestern Oklahoma State, and Central Oklahoma, along with Fort Lewis College in Colorado and the University of North Carolina at Pembroke. The five Oklahoma schools included a football independent (Northeastern State), a member of the Mid-America Intercollegiate Athletic Association (MIAA) (Central Oklahoma), and three members of the Great American Conference (GAC). Because the GAC played an eleven-game closed "silo" schedule starting in 2015, the First Americans Bowl provided a natural venue for Northeastern State and Central Oklahoma to renew old rivalries with the three NASNTI members of the Great American Conference, in years when they did not qualify for the Division II playoffs.

In October 2026, in releasing its first "watch list" for the second annual game, the bowl broadened the list of institutions eligible to participate, to include those with "meaningful Native-serving missions, programs, or infrastructure," as well as "strong historical, cultural, educational, or community ties to Indigenous communities."

== Game results ==
Date played	Winning team		Losing team		Attendance	notes
December 6, 2025	Northeastern State (Ind.)	56	East Central (GAC)	21	4,977	
December 5, 2026	Northeastern State (Ind.) vs. Chadron State (RMAC)					
