= Edd Bowers =

American football and basketball coach (1922–2008)

Biographical details
- Born: September 4, 1922
- Died: September 16, 2008 (aged 86); Grapevine, Texas, U.S.

Playing career

Football
- 1940: Grinnell

Coaching career (HC unless noted)

Football
- 1947–1953: Mount Pleasant HS (IA)
- 1956–1959: Iowa Wesleyan
- 1960–1978: Grinnell

Basketball
- 1973–1974: Grinnell

Administrative career (AD unless noted)
- 1956–1960: Iowa Wesleyan

Head coaching record
- Overall: 89–105–2 (college football); 4–16 (college basketball)

Accomplishments and honors

Championships
- Football; 2 MWC (1961–1962)

Edd William Bowers (September 4, 1922 – September 16, 2008) was an American football and basketball coach. He served as the head football coach at Iowa Wesleyan College in Mount Pleasant, Iowa from 1956 to 1959 and Grinnell College in Grinnell, Iowa from 1960 to 1978, compiling a career college football coaching record of 89–105–2. Bowers was also the head men's basketball coach at Grinnell from 1973 to 1974.

== Head coaching record ==
=== College football ===
Year	Team	Overall	Conference	Standing
Iowa Wesleyan Tigers (Iowa Conference) (1956–1959)
1956	Iowa Wesleyan	5–4	5–3	4th
1957	Iowa Wesleyan	2–7	1–7	9th
1958	Iowa Wesleyan	6–3	6–2	3rd
1959	Iowa Wesleyan	5–4	5–3	4th
Iowa Wesleyan:		18–18	17–15	
Grinnell Pioneers (Midwest Conference) (1960–1978)
1960	Grinnell	4–4	4–4	5th
1961	Grinnell	6–2	6–2	T–1st
1962	Grinnell	7–0–1	7–0–1	1st
1963	Grinnell	5–3	5–3	T–3rd
1964	Grinnell	5–3	5–3	T–4th
1965	Grinnell	6–2	6–2	2nd
1966	Grinnell	2–6	1–3	8th
1967	Grinnell	2–6	2–6	9th
1968	Grinnell	3–5	3–5	T–6th
1969	Grinnell	6–3	6–3	T–3rd
1970	Grinnell	5–4	4–4	5th
1971	Grinnell	2–7	1–7	T–8th
1972	Grinnell	2–7	1–7	9th
1973	Grinnell	0–9	0–8	10th
1974	Grinnell	3–6	2–5	6th
1975	Grinnell	4–5	3–5	6th
1976	Grinnell	3–5	0–5	6th (West)
1977	Grinnell	4–4–1	1–3–1	T–4th (West)
1978	Grinnell	2–6	0–4	5th (Blue)
Grinnell:		71–87–2	57–79–2	
Total:		89–105–2		
National championship Conference title Conference division title or championship game berth
