= Irwin Belk Complex =

Stadium in Charlotte, North Carolina

Coordinates: 35.2420°N 80.8524°W

- Interactive map of Irwin Belk Complex
- Full name: Irwin Belk Complex
- Capacity: 4,500

Construction
- Built: 2002–2003
- Opened: 2003

Tenant
- Johnson C. Smith Golden Bulls football

The Irwin Belk Complex is a multi-use 4,500 seat stadium on the campus of Johnson C. Smith University (JCSU) in Charlotte, North Carolina United States. The stadium plays host to JCSU events. It is named for benefactor, Irwin Belk of Belk stores fame.
