= Brian Ferguson (American football) =

American football coach (born c. 1975)

Biographical details
- Born: c. 1975 (age 50–51); Colorado Springs, Colorado, U.S.
- Education: University of Northern Colorado (1998); Adams State University

Playing career
- 1995–1998: Adams State
- 1999: Northern Colorado

Coaching career (HC unless noted)
- 2000–2001: Tampa Bay Buccaneers (ASC)
- 2001: South Florida (VSC)
- 2001–2003: Rhein Fire (assistant)
- 2003–2004: East Lake HS (FL) (assistant)
- 2005: Jacksonville Jaguars (ASC)
- 2007–2008: Bartram Trail HS (FL) (assistant)
- 2008: Jacksonville Jaguars (ASC)
- 2009: Tiffin (WR/ST)
- 2010: Tiffin (OL/RB/ST)
- 2011–2015: Jacksonville Sharks (AHC)
- 2014: Jacksonville (OL)
- 2015: Jacksonville (QB)
- 2016: Tusculum (OC/QB)
- 2017–2019: Tusculum (AHC/OC/QB)
- 2020–2022: Concord (OC/QB)
- 2023–2024: Concord
- 2025: Millersville (OC/QB)
- 2025: Millersville (interim HC)

Head coaching record
- Overall: 2–26

Brian Ferguson (born c. 1975) is an American football coach. He was the head football coach for Concord University from 2023 to 2024 and he served as the interim head coach for Millersville University in 2025. He previously coached for the Tampa Bay Buccaneers and Jacksonville Jaguars of the National Football League (NFL), Rhein Fire of NFL Europe, the Jacksonville Sharks of the Arena Football League (AFL), South Florida, East Lake High School, Bartram Trail High School, Tiffin, Jacksonville, and Tusculum. He played college football for Northern Colorado and Adams State.

== Head coaching record ==
Year	Team	Overall	Conference	Standing	Bowl/playoffs
Concord Mountain Lions (Mountain East Conference) (2023–2024)
2023	Concord	1–10	1–9	10th	
2024	Concord	1–10	1–8	9th	
Concord:		2–20	2–17		
Millersville Marauders (Pennsylvania State Athletic Conference) (2025)
2025	Millersville	0–6	0–5	8th (East)	
Millersville:		0–6	0–5		
Total:		2–26			
