= Mick Caba =

American football coach (born 1950)

Biographical details
- Born: February 16, 1950 (age 76); Trenton, Michigan, U.S.
- Education: Georgetown College (1973)

Playing career

Football
- 1968: Bowling Green
- 1969–1972: Georgetown (KY)

Coaching career (HC unless noted)

Football
- 1973: Litchfield HS (KY)
- 1974–1976: Grayson County HS (KY)
- 1977: Mason HS (MI)
- 1978: Whitmore Lake HS (MI)
- 1979: Kalamazoo (assistant)
- 1980: Hartford HS (MI)
- 1981–1984: Inver Hills
- 1985–1988: Iowa Wesleyan
- 1989–1990: Oklahoma Panhandle State
- 1991–1992: Minnesota–Morris
- 1993–1996: Magoffin County HS (KY)
- 1997–1998: William Penn
- 2000–2014: Alfred State

Baseball
- 1978: Whitmore Lake HS (MI)

Men's baseball Inver Hills Comm College

Women's basketball
- 1984: Inver Hills
- ?–1988: Iowa Wesleyan

Administrative career (AD unless noted)
- 1980: Hartford HS (MI)
- 1985–1988: Iowa Wesleyan

Head coaching record
- Overall: 22–103 (college football); 76-87 (junior college football)

Accomplishments and honors

Awards
- Northeast Football Conference Coach of the Year (2005); NJCAA Football Hall of Fame (2012); Oscar A Carlson High School Hall of Fame (2015)

James "Mick" Caba (born February 16, 1950) is an American former college football coach. He was the head football coach for Litchfield High School in 1973, Grayson County High School from 1974 to 1976, Mason High School in 1977, Whitmore Lake High School in 1978, Hartford High School in 1980, Inver Hills Community College from 1981 to 1984, Iowa Wesleyan University from 1985 to 1988, Oklahoma Panhandle State University from 1989 to 1990, the University of Minnesota Morris from 1991 to 1992, Magoffin County High School from 1993 to 1996, William Penn University from 1997 to 1998, and Alfred State College from 2000 to 2014. He helped guide Alfred State from junior college status from 2000 to 2011 up to NCAA Division III competition from 2012 to 2014. He was inducted into the NJCAA Football Hall of Fame in 2012. He also coached for Kalamazoo. He played college football for Bowling Green and Georgetown (KY).

== Head coaching record ==
=== College football ===
Year	Team	Overall	Conference	Standing	Bowl/playoffs
Iowa Wesleyan Tigers (NAIA Division II independent) (1985–1988)
1985	Iowa Wesleyan	2–7			
1986	Iowa Wesleyan	3–7			
1987	Iowa Wesleyan	4–7			
1988	Iowa Wesleyan	0–10			
Iowa Wesleyan:		9–31			
Oklahoma Panhandle State Aggies (NAIA Division II independent) (1989–1990)
1989	Oklahoma Panhandle State	1–10			
1990	Oklahoma Panhandle State	1–9			
Oklahoma Panhandle State:		2–19			
Minnesota–Morris Cougars (Northern Intercollegiate Conference) (1991–1992)
1991	Minnesota–Morris	2–9	1–5	6th	
1992	Minnesota–Morris	1–10	0–6	7th	
Minnesota–Morris:		3–19	1–11		
William Penn Statesmen (Iowa Intercollegiate Athletic Conference) (1997–1998)
1997	William Penn	1–9	0–8	9th	
1998	William Penn	1–9	1–9	10th	
William Penn:		2–18	1–17		
Alfred State Pioneers (NCAA Division III independent) (2012–2014)
2012	Alfred State	1–3			
2013	Alfred State	3–6			
2014	Alfred State	2–7			
Alfred State:		6–16			
Total:		22–103			

=== Junior college football ===
Year	Team	Overall	Conference	Standing	Bowl/playoffs
Inver Hills Blue Knights (Minnesota Junior College Athletic Association / Minnesota Community College Athletic Association / Minnesota Community College Conference) (1981–1984)
1981	Inver Hills	4–5	4–5	6th (Southern)	
1982	Inver Hills	2–6	2–6	(Southern)	
1983	Inver Hills	0–7	0–4	5th (Central)	
1984	Inver Hills	6–4		(Central)	
Inver Hills:		12–22			
Alfred State Pioneers (Northeast Football Conference) (2000–2010)
2000	Alfred State	5–4	2–3	T–3rd	
2001	Alfred State	1–9	0–6	7th	
2002	Alfred State	5–5	3–3	3rd	
2003	Alfred State	7–4	3–4	5th	
2004	Alfred State	4–6	1–6	6th	
2005	Alfred State	5–5	2–5	7th	
2006	Alfred State	5–5	1–4	5th	
2007	Alfred State	3–7	0–5	6th	
2008	Alfred State	4–5	0–5	6th	
2009	Alfred State	5–5	1–4	6th	
2010	Alfred State	4–6	1–5	T–6th	
Alfred State Pioneers (NJCAA independent) (2011)
2011	Alfred State	6–4			
Alfred State:		54–65	14–50		
Total:		66–87			
