= Shannon Currier =

American football player and coach (born c. 1970)

Biographical details
- Born: c. 1970 (age 55–56)
- Education: Iowa Wesleyan (1988)

Playing career
- 1989–1992: Hamline
- Position: Quarterback

Coaching career (HC unless noted)
- 1993: Silver Valley HS (CA) (RB)
- 1994: Bemidji State (GA/RB)
- 1995–1996: Minnesota–Crookston (OC/RC)
- 1997–1998: Southwest Minnesota State (OC/RC)
- 1999: Concordia–St. Paul (OC/RC)
- 2000–2003: Concordia–St. Paul
- 2004–2008: Truman State
- 2016–2025: Concordia–St. Paul

Head coaching record
- Overall: 76–122 (college); 0–0 (high school)
- Bowls: 0–1

Accomplishments and honors

Championships
- 1 NSIC (2003)

Awards
- NSIC Coach of the Year (2003)

Shannon Currier (born c. 1970) is an American football coach and former player. Currier served two stints as the head football coach at Concordia University, St. Paul, from 2000 to 2003 and 2016 to 2025. He was also the head football coach at Truman State University from 2004 to 2008.

Currier attended high school in Cosmos, Minnesota.

== Head coaching record ==
=== College ===
Year	Team	Overall	Conference	Standing	Bowl/playoffs
Concordia Golden Bears (Northern Sun Intercollegiate Conference) (2000–2003)
2000	Concordia–St. Paul	7–3	5–3	T–3rd	
2001	Concordia–St. Paul	8–3	6–3	3rd	
2002	Concordia–St. Paul	9–2	7–2	3rd	
2003	Concordia–St. Paul	8–4	7–1	T–1st	L Mineral Water
Truman Bulldogs (Mid-America Intercollegiate Athletics Association) (2004–2008)
2004	Truman	2–9	2–7	T–8th	
2005	Truman	2–9	0–8	9th	
2006	Truman	6–5	6–3	T–4th	
2007	Truman	6–5	4–5	T–6th	
2008	Truman	4–7	3–6	7th	
Truman:		20–35	15–29		
Concordia Golden Bears (Northern Sun Intercollegiate Conference) (2016–2025)
2016	Concordia–St. Paul	2–9	2–9	8th (South)	
2017	Concordia–St. Paul	2–9	2–9	8th (South)	
2018	Concordia–St. Paul	5–6	5–6	5th (South)	
2019	Concordia–St. Paul	6–5	6–5	5th (South)	
2020–21	No team—COVID-19				
2021	Concordia–St. Paul	1–10	1–10	7th (South)	
2022	Concordia–St. Paul	1–10	1–10	7th (South)	
2023	Concordia–St. Paul	3–8	2–8	T–10th	
2024	Concordia–St. Paul	2–9	2–8	11th	
2025	Concordia–St. Paul	2–9	2–8	6th (South)	
Concordia–St. Paul:		56–87	48–82		
Total:		76–122			
National championship Conference title Conference division title or championship game berth
