= Joshua Schumacher =

American football coach (born 1985)

Current position
- Title: Head coach
- Team: Concordia–St. Paul
- Conference: NSIC
- Record: 4–7

Biographical details
- Born: c. 1985 (age 40–41)
- Education: Concordia University Chicago (2007); Concordia University Irvine (2012)

Playing career
- 2003–2006: Concordia (IL)

Coaching career (HC unless noted)
- 2007: Concordia (IL) (assistant)
- 2008–2012: Faith Lutheran HS (NV) (assistant)
- 2013–2016: Concordia (MI) (DC)
- 2017–2024: Concordia (MI)
- 2025: Saginaw Valley State (assoc. HC/ST/LB)
- 2026–present: Concordia–St. Paul

Head coaching record
- Overall: 63–32
- Tournaments: 3–5 (NAIA playoffs)

Accomplishments and honors

Championships
- 2 MSFA Mideast League (2020–2021)

Awards
- 2× AFCA Region II Coach of the Year (2020–2021); 2× MSFA Mideast League Coach of the Year (2017, 2020)

Joshua Schumacher (born c. 1984) is an American college football coach. He is the head coach for Concordia University, St. Paul, a position he has held since 2026. He was the head football coach for Concordia University Ann Arbor from 2017 to 2024. He also coached for Concordia in River Forest, Illinois, and Faith Lutheran High School. He played college football for Concordia University Chicago. He was selected as a member of the 2019 AFCA 35 Under 35 Coaches Leadership Institute. Schumacher led the Concordia Cardinals in their final season as it was announced on June 19, 2024, that the 2024–25 season would be the last year of athletics at Concordia University Ann Arbor.

== Head coaching record ==
Year	Team	Overall	Conference	Standing	Bowl/playoffs	NAIA Coaches'^{#}
Concordia Cardinals (Mid-States Football Association) (2017–2024)
2017	Concordia (MI)	9–2	5–1	2nd (MEL)	L NAIA First Round	15
2018	Concordia (MI)	10–3	5–1	2nd (MEL)	L NAIA Quarterfinal	6
2019	Concordia (MI)	8–3	4–2	T–2nd (MEL)	L NAIA First Round	12
2020–21	Concordia (MI)	6–1	4–0	1st (MEL)	L NAIA Quarterfinal	6
2021	Concordia (MI)	9–2	6–1	T–1st (MEL)	L NAIA Quarterfinal	8
2022	Concordia (MI)	5–5	4–3	T–3rd (MEL)		
2023	Concordia (MI)	7–3	4–3	4th (MEL)		
2024	Concordia (MI)	5–6	3–2	3rd (MEL)		
Concordia (MI):		59–25	35–13			
Concordia Golden Bears (Northern Sun Intercollegiate Conference) (2026–present)
2026	Concordia–St. Paul	4–7	3–7 / 1–5	11th / 6th (South)		
Concordia–St. Paul:		4–7	3–7			
Total:		63–32				
National championship Conference title Conference division title or championship game berth
