= J. C. Morgan =

American football coach (born 1982)

Biographical details
- Born: May 1, 1982 (age 44); Middletown, Delaware, U.S.
- Education: Bucknell University (2004)

Playing career
- 2000–2003: Bucknell
- Position: Fullback

Coaching career (HC unless noted)
- 2003: Lewisburg Area HS (PA) (assistant)
- 2004: Moravian (QB)
- 2005–2014: Shippensburg (RB)
- 2015–2017: Shippensburg (OC/RB)
- 2018–2025: Millersville

Head coaching record
- Overall: 15–55

J. C. Morgan (born April 30, 1982) is an American college football coach. He was the head football coach for Millersville University of Pennsylvania, a position he held from 2018 until 2025. He also coached for Lewisburg Area High School, Moravian, and Shippensburg. He played college football for Bucknell as a fullback.

== Head coaching record ==
Year	Team	Overall	Conference	Standing	Bowl/playoffs
Millersville Marauders (Pennsylvania State Athletic Conference) (2018–present)
2018	Millersville	2–9	2–4	5th (East)	
2019	Millersville	2–9	1–6	7th (East)	
2020–21	No team—COVID-19				
2021	Millersville	2–9	1–6	7th (East)	
2022	Millersville	5–6	4–3	T–3rd (East)	
2023	Millersville	3–7	1–6	8th (East)	
2024	Millersville	1–10	0–7	8th (East)	
2025	Millersville	0–5 (Note: Millersville fired Morgan after five games.)	0–2	(East)	
Millersville:		15–55	9–34		
Total:		15–55			
