= Tim Clifton =

American football coach (born c. 1953)

Biographical details
- Born: c. 1953 (age 72–73); Macon, Georgia, U.S.
- Education: Mercer University (1976)

Playing career

Baseball
- c. 1973: Mercer
- Position: Second baseman

Coaching career (HC unless noted)

Football
- 1976–1980: Stratford HS (GA) (assistant)
- 1981–1983: South Carolina (assistant)
- 1984–1985: VMI (assistant)
- 1986–1987: Fayetteville State (OC)
- 1987–1992: Ferrum (OC)
- 1993–2024: Mars Hill

Head coaching record
- Overall: 173–156
- Tournaments: 0–1 (NCAA D-II playoffs)

Accomplishments and honors

Championships
- 1 SAC (2011); 2 SAC North Division (2022, 2023)

Timothy Clem Clifton (born c. 1953) is an American former college football coach. He was the head football coach for Mars Hill University, a position he has held from 1993 until his retirement in 2024. He previously coached for Stratford Academy, South Carolina, VMI, Fayetteville State, and Ferrum. He played college baseball for Mercer as a second baseman.

== Head coaching record ==
Year	Team	Overall	Conference	Standing	Bowl/playoffs	AFCA^{#}
Mars Hill Lions (South Atlantic Conference) (1993–2024)
1993	Mars Hill	4–6	2–5	7th		
1994	Mars Hill	7–4	4–3	T–3rd		
1995	Mars Hill	6–4	4–3	T–3rd		
1996	Mars Hill	5–5	3–4	5th		
1997	Mars Hill	5–5	3–4	T–5th		
1998	Mars Hill	1–10	0–7	8th		
1999	Mars Hill	7–4	5–3	3rd		
2000	Mars Hill	5–5	3–4	5th		
2001	Mars Hill	7–4	4–3	5th		
2002	Mars Hill	7–4	4–3	4th		
2003	Mars Hill	7–4	3–4	4th		
2004	Mars Hill	6–4	3–4	6th		
2005	Mars Hill	4–6	3–4	T–4th		
2006	Mars Hill	4–7	1–6	T–7th		
2007	Mars Hill	5–5	1–5	6th		
2008	Mars Hill	7–4	4–3	T–4th		
2009	Mars Hill	7–4	3–4	5th		
2010	Mars Hill	5–6	3–4	T–5th		
2011	Mars Hill	8–3	6–1	T–1st	L NCAA Division II Second Round	19
2012	Mars Hill	6–4	5–2	T–2nd		
2013	Mars Hill	3–8	1–6	8th		
2014	Mars Hill	4–6	3–4	T–4th		
2015	Mars Hill	6–5	5–2	T–2nd		
2016	Mars Hill	5–6	3–4	T–4th		
2017	Mars Hill	3–7	1–6	8th		
2018	Mars Hill	4–6	3–4	T–5th		
2019	Mars Hill	5–6	4–4	T–4th		
2020–21	Mars Hill	1–2	1–2	T–3rd (Mountain)		
2021	Mars Hill	8–3	6–2	T–2nd		
2022	Mars Hill	7–3	7–2	1st (Mountain)		
2023	Mars Hill	8–2	6–2	T–1st (Mountain)		
2024	Mars Hill	5–4	5–2	3rd (Mountain)		
Mars Hill:		173–156	109–116			
Total:		173–156				
National championship Conference title Conference division title or championship game berth
