= Roger Waialae =

American football coach (born c. 1987)

Biographical details
- Born: c. 1966 (age 59–60); Hawaii, U.S.
- Education: University of Dubuque (1989)

Playing career
- 1985–1988: Dubuque
- 1989: München Rangers
- Position: Quarterback

Coaching career (HC unless noted)
- 1989: Dubuque (GA)
- 1989: München Rangers (OC)
- 1990–1991: Bethany (WV) (OC)
- 1992–2004: West Liberty (OC)
- 2005–2025: West Liberty

Head coaching record
- Overall: 102–128
- Tournaments: 1–1 (NCAA D-II playoffs)

Accomplishments and honors

Championships
- 1 WVIAC (2009)

Awards
- Second Team All-Iowa Conference (1987)

Roger Waialae (born c. 1966) is an American former football coach. He was the head football coach for West Liberty University, a position held from 2005 until his retirement in 2025. He also coached for Dubuque, Bethany (WV), and the München Rangers of the German Football League (GFL). He played college football and golf for Dubuque as well as one year of professional football with the München Rangers of the GFL.

== Head coaching record ==
Year	Team	Overall	Conference	Standing	Bowl/playoffs	AFCA^{#}
West Liberty Hilltoppers (West Virginia Intercollegiate Athletic Conference) (2005–2012)
2005	West Liberty	6–5	4–4	T–4th		
2006	West Liberty	7–4	4–3	T–2nd		
2007	West Liberty	8–3	6–2	T–2nd		
2008	West Liberty	7–4	6–2	T–2nd		
2009	West Liberty	11–2	8–0	1st	L NCAA Division II Quarterfinals	9
2010	West Liberty	7–3	6–2	T–2nd		
2011	West Liberty	1–10	1–7	T–7th		
2012	West Liberty	6–5	4–4	T–5th		
West Liberty Hilltoppers (Mountain East Conference) (2013–2025)
2013	West Liberty	3–8	3–6	8th		
2014	West Liberty	6–5	6–4	5th		
2015	West Liberty	5–6	5–5	T–5th		
2016	West Liberty	4–7	4–6	T–6th		
2017	West Liberty	3–8	3–7	T–9th		
2018	West Liberty	3–8	3–7	9th		
2019	West Liberty	5–6	4–6	8th		
2020–21	West Liberty	2–2	2–2	T–3rd (North)		
2021	West Liberty	4–7	4–6	T–8th		
2022	West Liberty	4–7	3–7	T–9th		
2023	West Liberty	4–6	4–5	T–7th		
2024	West Liberty	2–9	2–7	8th		
2025	West Liberty	3–8	3–5	T–6th		
West Liberty:		102–128	85–100			
Total:		102–128				
National championship Conference title Conference division title or championship game berth
