= David Walker =

David Walker or Dave Walker may refer to:

== Businessmen ==
- David Walker (banker) (born 1939), British banker, ex-chairman of Morgan Stanley International
- David Walker, English/American brewer, co-founder of Firestone Walker Brewing Company in 1996
- David Davis Walker (1840–1918), American businessman

== Clergy ==
- David Walker (Catholic bishop) (born 1938), Australian Roman Catholic bishop since 1996
- David Walker (bishop of Manchester) (born 1957), Church of England bishop

== Artists and writers ==
- David Walker (costume designer) (1934–2008), designer for ballet, theatre and film
- David F. Walker, American comic book creator
- David Walker (born 1976), birth name of Angus Oblong, American author and illustrator
- David Walker (author) (1911–1992), Scottish-born Canadian writer
- Dave Walker (1955–2014), Canadian writer who died under mysterious circumstances; see Death of Dave Walker

== Musicians ==
- David Walker, American opera singer, winner of the 1998 Metropolitan Opera National Council Auditions
- David Walker, former singer with the American Gospel quartet the Kingdom Heirs
- David G. Walker (born 1946), British pianist, singer and composer
- David T. Walker (born 1941), American guitarist
- Dave Walker (born 1945), British musician, member of the band Fleetwood Mac
- Bunker Hill (musician) (1941–1986), stage name of American R&B and gospel singer born David Walker

== Politicians ==
- David Walker (Arkansas politician) (1806–1879), member of the Arkansas General Assembly and the Arkansas Supreme Court
- David Walker (Canadian politician) (born 1947), Canadian politician who served in the Canadian House of Commons
- David Walker (Kentucky politician) (1763–1820), United States Representative from Kentucky
- David Walker (New Hampshire politician), member of the New Hampshire House of Representatives
- David Walker (West Virginia politician) (born 1952), member of the West Virginia House of Delegates
- David James Walker (1905–1995), Canadian politician
- David S. Walker (1815–1891), governor of Florida

== Civil servants ==
- David M. Walker (U.S. Comptroller General) (born 1951), 7th Comptroller General of the United States
- David Marr Walker (1835–1920), Canadian lawyer, judge and political figure in Manitoba
- David Walker (diplomat), WTO trade representative from New Zealand

== Academics ==
- David Walker (historian) (born 1945), Australian historian of the Australian - Asian engagement
- David A. Walker (scientist) (1928–2012), British professor of photosynthesis
- David Maxwell Walker (1920–2014), Scottish lawyer and academic
- David Grant Walker (1923–2017), British historian

== Sportsmen ==
- David Walker (basketball) (born 1993), American basketball player
- David Walker (cricketer) (1913–1942), English cricketer
- David Walker (racing driver) (1941–2024), Australian racing driver
- David Walker (rower) (1932–2014), British Olympic rower
- David Walker (boxer) (born 1976), English boxer
- David Walker (sprinter), winner of the 1983 NCAA Division I outdoor 4 × 400 meter relay championship

Association football

- Dave Walker (footballer, born 1908), English footballer for Walsall and Brighton & Hove Albion
- Dave Walker (footballer, born 1941) (1941–2015), English footballer for Burnley and Southampton
- Dave Walker, Scottish former professional footballer, played for St. Mirren FC in the 1959 Scottish Cup Final

Gridiron football

- David Walker (American football coach) (born 1969), former college football star and assistant coach for the Chicago Bears
- David Walker (linebacker) (born 2000), American football player
- David Walker (quarterback) (born 1955), former American football quarterback for Texas A&M University
- Dave Walker (American football), American high school football coach

== Others ==
- David Walker (abolitionist) (1796–1830), American black abolitionist
- David Walker (journalist) (born 1941), American television news anchor
- Sir David Walker (RAF administrative officer) (born 1956), Royal Air Force air marshal and Master of the Household to the Queen
- David Walker (RAF aircrew officer) (1956–2023), Royal Air Force air marshal
- David M. Walker (astronaut) (1944–2001), United States astronaut
- David Walker (EastEnders), fictional character on the BBC soap opera, EastEnders
