= 2022 NCAA Division II football season =

American college football season

- Total No. of teams: 164
- Regular season: August 31 – November 12, 2022
- Playoffs: November 19 – December 17, 2022
- National Championship: McKinney Independent School District Stadium; McKinney, TX; December 17, 2022
- Champion: Ferris State
- Harlon Hill Trophy: John Matocha, QB, Colorado Mines

The 2022 NCAA Division II football season, part of college football in the United States organized by the National Collegiate Athletic Association (NCAA) at the Division II level, began on August 31 and ended on December 17 with the Division II championship at the McKinney Independent School District Stadium in McKinney, Texas. Ferris State defeated Colorado Mines, 41–14, for its second consecutive championship.

== D-II team wins over FCS teams ==
September 10: Missouri S&T 17, Drake 14 ^{OT}
September 17: Delta State 28, Mississippi Valley State 17
October 1: Lane 28, Tennessee State 27 ^{OT}

== Conference changes and new programs ==
=== Conference changes ===
- Prior to the start of the season, the Great Northwest Athletic Conference announced that it would cease sponsorship of football. The GNAC previously sponsored football in two stints: 2001 to 2006 and 2008 to 2021. The three remaining members, Central Washington, Simon Fraser, and Western Oregon, subsequently joined the Lone Star Conference as football-only affiliated members.

=== Membership changes ===
School	Former conference	New conference
Barton Bulldogs	Independent (D-II)	SAC
Central Washington Wildcats	GNAC	Lone Star
Emory & Henry Wasps	Independent (D-II)	SAC
Erskine Flying Fleet	Independent (D-II)	SAC
Lindenwood Lions	GLVC	Ohio Valley (D-I FCS)
Northwood Timberwolves	GLIAC	G-MAC
Post Eagles	New program	Independent
Simon Fraser Red Leafs	GNAC	Lone Star
Stonehill Skyhawks	Northeast-10	Northeast (D-I FCS)
Texas A&M–Commerce Lions	Lone Star	Southland (D-I FCS)
Western Oregon Wolves	GNAC	Lone Star

== Headlines ==
- On October 27, 2022, the D-II Presidents Council voted to support a change to redshirt rules that had been proposed by six D-II conferences. Under the proposal, players in their first season of college attendance can play up to three games before losing redshirt status. The proposal will be voted on by the entire D-II football membership at the 2023 NCAA Convention.

== Rankings ==
The top 25 from the AFCA Coaches' Poll.

=== Preseason Poll ===
AFCA
Ranking	Team
1	Ferris State (30)
2	NW Missouri State
3	Valdosta State
4	Colorado Mines
5	Grand Valley State
6	Shepherd
7	Angelo State
8	Bowie State
9	Harding
10	Notre Dame (OH)
11	West Florida
12	West Georgia
13	Kutztown
14	Nebraska–Kearney
15	Newberry
16	New Haven
17	Western Colorado
18	Albany State
19т	Lenoir–Rhyne
19т	Ouachita Baptist
21	California (PA)
22	Bemidji State
23	Slippery Rock
24	Midwestern State
25	Augustana (SD)

== Conference standings ==
=== Super Region 1 ===
2022 Great Midwest Athletic Conference football standings
	Conf.			Overall
Team	W		L	W		L
No. 13 Ashland $^	7	–	1	10	–	2
Ohio Dominican	6	–	2	7	–	3
Findlay	6	–	2	7	–	4
Tiffin #	6	–	2	6	–	5
Hillsdale	4	–	4	5	–	6
Lake Erie	3	–	5	3	–	8
Northwood	2	–	6	3	–	8
Kentucky Wesleyan	1	–	7	2	–	9
Walsh	1	–	7	1	–	9
$ – Conference champion; ^ – NCAA Division II playoff participant; # – America's Crossroads Bowl participant; Rankings from AFCA poll

2022 Mountain East Conference football standings
	Conf.			Overall
Team	W		L	W		L
No. 23 Notre Dame (OH) $^	9	–	1	9	–	3
Concord	8	–	2	9	–	2
Frostburg State	7	–	3	8	–	3
Glenville State	6	–	4	7	–	4
Wheeling	6	–	4	7	–	4
West Virginia State	6	–	4	7	–	4
Charleston (WV)	6	–	4	6	–	5
UNC Pembroke	5	–	5	5	–	6
West Liberty	3	–	7	4	–	7
Fairmont State	3	–	7	3	–	8
West Virginia Wesleyan	1	–	9	1	–	10
Alderson Broaddus	0	–	10	0	–	11
$ – Conference champion; ^ – NCAA Division II playoff participant; Rankings from AFCA Poll

2022 Northeast-10 Conference football standings
	Conf.			Overall
Team	W		L	W		L
Assumption $^	6	–	1	8	–	3
New Haven ^	6	–	1	8	–	3
Bentley	5	–	2	7	–	3
Pace	4	–	3	6	–	4
Saint Anselm	3	–	4	6	–	4
Southern Connecticut	2	–	5	3	–	8
Franklin Pierce	1	–	6	2	–	8
American International	1	–	6	1	–	9
$ – Conference champion; ^ – NCAA Division II playoff participant

2022 Pennsylvania State Athletic Conference football standings
	Conf.			Overall
Team	W		L	W		L
East Division
No. 6 Shepherd xy^	7	–	0	13	–	2
Kutztown	5	–	2	8	–	3
West Chester	4	–	3	7	–	4
Millersville	4	–	3	5	–	6
Shippensburg	3	–	4	5	–	6
East Stroudsburg	3	–	4	4	–	7
Bloomsburg	2	–	5	4	–	7
Lock Haven	0	–	7	1	–	10
West Division
No. 11 IUP xy$^	6	–	1	10	–	2
No. 16 Slippery Rock x^	6	–	1	10	–	3
Gannon x	6	–	1	8	–	3
California (PA)	4	–	3	6	–	5
Edinboro	2	–	5	5	–	6
Clarion	2	–	5	3	–	8
Seton Hill	2	–	5	2	–	9
Mercyhurst	0	–	7	2	–	9
Championship: IUP 24, Shepherd 21
$ – Conference champion; x – Division champion/co-champions; y – Championship game participant; ^ – NCAA Division II playoff participant; Rankings from AFCA poll

=== Super Region 2 ===
2022 Central Intercollegiate Athletic Association football standings
	Conf.			Overall
Team	W		L	W		L
Northern Division
Chowan xy	7	–	1	7	–	4
No. 18 Virginia Union x^	7	–	1	9	–	2
Virginia State	5	–	3	6	–	4
Bowie State	5	–	3	6	–	4
Elizabeth City State	2	–	6	2	–	8
Lincoln (PA)	1	–	6	2	–	7
Southern Division
Fayetteville State xy$^	7	–	1	9	–	3
Shaw	4	–	4	4	–	6
Winston-Salem State	3	–	4	3	–	6
Livingstone	3	–	5	4	–	6
Johnson C. Smith	2	–	6	2	–	7
St. Augustine's	1	–	7	1	–	9
Championship: Fayetteville State 31, Chowan 28
$ – Conference champion; x – Division champion/co-champions; y – Championship game participant; ^ – NCAA Division II playoff participant; Rankings from AFCA Poll

2022 Gulf South Conference football standings
	Conf.			Overall
Team	W		L	W		L
No. 4 West Florida +^	6	–	1	12	–	2
No. 9 Delta State +^	6	–	1	11	–	2
No. 19 West Georgia	5	–	2	8	–	2
West Alabama	3	–	4	5	–	6
Mississippi College	3	–	4	4	–	7
Valdosta State	2	–	5	5	–	6
North Greenville	2	–	5	3	–	8
Shorter	1	–	6	3	–	8
+ – Conference co-champions; ^ – NCAA Division II playoff participant; Rankings from AFCA Poll

2022 South Atlantic Conference football standings
	Conf.			Overall
Team	W		L	W		L
Mountain Division
Mars Hill xy	7	–	2	7	–	3
Tusculum	6	–	3	8	–	3
Carson–Newman	5	–	4	6	–	5
Emory & Henry*	4	–	5	5	–	6
Virginia–Wise	1	–	8	2	–	9
Erskine	0	–	9	2	–	9
Piedmont Division
No. 21 Newberry xy$	7	–	2	9	–	2
No. 15 Wingate x^	7	–	2	11	–	3
Lenoir–Rhyne x	7	–	2	8	–	3
Limestone x^	7	–	2	8	–	4
Barton	3	–	6	4	–	7
Catawba	0	–	9	1	–	10
Championship: Newberry 27, Mars Hill 24
$ – Conference champion; x – Division champion/co-champions; y – Championship game participant; ^ – NCAA Division II playoff participant; * – Emory & Henry ineligible for postseason play due to transition from NCAA Division III; Rankings from AFCA Poll

2022 Southern Intercollegiate Athletic Conference football standings
	Conf.			Overall
Team	W		L	W		L
East Division
No. 12 Benedict xy$^	7	–	0	11	–	1
Fort Valley State	5	–	2	8	–	2
Albany State	5	–	2	7	–	3
Edward Waters*	4	–	3	5	–	6
Savannah State	3	–	4	5	–	5
Clark Atlanta	2	–	6	3	–	7
Morehouse	1	–	6	1	–	9
Allen*	0	–	7	1	–	8
West Division
Tuskegee xy	7	–	0	8	–	3
Lane	4	–	2	5	–	5
Kentucky State	4	–	3	4	–	6
Central State (OH)	2	–	5	3	–	7
Miles	1	–	6	1	–	9
Championship: Benedict 58, Tuskegee 21
$ – Conference champion; x – Division champion/co-champions; y – Championship game participant; ^ – NCAA Division II playoff participant; * – Allen and Edward Waters ineligible for postseason play due to transition from NAIA; Rankings from AFCA Poll

2022 NCAA Division II independents football records
	Conf.			Overall
Team	W		L	W		L
Bluefield State		–		3	–	4
Post		–		0	–	10

=== Super Region 3 ===
2022 Great American Conference football standings
	Conf.			Overall
Team	W		L	W		L
No. 10 Ouachita Baptist $^	11	–	0	11	–	1
No. 22 Harding	9	–	2	9	–	2
East Central #	8	–	3	9	–	3
Henderson State	8	–	3	8	–	3
SE Oklahoma State #	6	–	5	6	–	6
Arkansas Tech	5	–	6	5	–	6
Southern Arkansas	5	–	6	5	–	6
Southern Nazarene	5	–	6	5	–	6
SW Oklahoma State	4	–	7	4	–	7
Arkansas–Monticello	3	–	8	3	–	8
Oklahoma Baptist	1	–	10	1	–	10
NW Oklahoma State	1	–	10	1	–	10
$ – Conference champion; ^ – NCAA Division II playoff participant; # – bowl participant (East Central: Heritage Bowl, SE Oklahoma State: Live United Texarkana Bowl); Rankings from AFCA poll

2022 Great Lakes Intercollegiate Athletic Conference football standings
	Conf.			Overall
Team	W		L	W		L
No. 3 Grand Valley State $^	6	–	0	12	–	1
No. 1 Ferris State ^	5	–	1	14	–	1
No. 20 Davenport ^	4	–	2	8	–	3
Saginaw Valley State	3	–	3	8	–	3
Michigan Tech	2	–	4	4	–	7
Northern Michigan	1	–	5	4	–	7
Wayne State (MI)	0	–	6	1	–	9
$ – Conference champion; ^ – NCAA Division II playoff participant; Rankings from AFCA Poll

2022 Great Lakes Valley Conference football standings
	Conf.			Overall
Team	W		L	W		L
No. 17 Indianapolis $^	6	–	0	9	–	2
No. 25 Truman State #	5	–	1	9	–	2
Southwest Baptist	4	–	2	6	–	5
McKendree	2	–	4	5	–	6
Missouri S&T	2	–	4	3	–	7
Quincy	1	–	5	4	–	7
William Jewell	1	–	5	2	–	9
$ – Conference champion; ^ – NCAA Division II playoff participant; # – America's Crossroads Bowl participant; Rankings from AFCA Poll

2022 Mid-America Intercollegiate Athletics Association football standings
	Conf.			Overall
Team	W		L	W		L
No. 5 Pittsburg State $^	11	–	0	12	–	1
No. 8 NW Missouri State ^	9	–	2	10	–	3
Emporia State #	8	–	3	9	–	3
Nebraska–Kearney	8	–	3	8	–	3
Washburn	7	–	4	7	–	4
Central Oklahoma	6	–	5	6	–	5
Missouri Western	5	–	6	5	–	6
Central Missouri	4	–	7	4	–	7
Missouri Southern	4	–	7	4	–	7
Fort Hays State	3	–	8	3	–	8
Northeastern State	1	–	10	1	–	10
Lincoln (MO)	0	–	11	0	–	11
$ – Conference champion; ^ – NCAA Division II playoff participant; # – Live United Texarkana Bowl participant; Rankings from AFCA Poll

=== Super Region 4 ===
2022 Lone Star Conference football standings
	Conf.			Overall
Team	W		L	W		L
No. 7 Angelo State $^	9	–	0	12	–	1
Central Washington	6	–	3	6	–	4
Texas A&M–Kingsville #	5	–	4	7	–	5
Midwestern State	5	–	4	6	–	5
Western New Mexico	5	–	4	6	–	5
Western Oregon	5	–	4	6	–	5
UT Permian Basin	4	–	5	5	–	6
West Texas A&M	3	–	6	5	–	6
Eastern New Mexico	2	–	7	3	–	8
Simon Fraser	1	–	8	1	–	9
$ – Conference champion; ^ – NCAA Division II playoff participant; # – Heritage Bowl participant; Rankings from AFCA Poll

2022 Northern Sun Intercollegiate Conference football standings
	Conf.			Overall
Team	W		L	W		L
North Division
No. 24 Bemidji State x+^	9	–	2	10	–	3
Minnesota Duluth	8	–	3	8	–	3
Northern State	6	–	5	6	–	5
MSU Moorhead	4	–	7	4	–	7
Mary	2	–	9	2	–	9
Minot State	1	–	10	1	–	10
Concordia–St. Paul	1	–	10	1	–	10
South Division
No. 14 Minnesota State x+^	9	–	2	10	–	3
Wayne State (NE) +^	9	–	2	9	–	3
Winona State ^	8	–	3	8	–	4
Sioux Falls	8	–	3	8	–	3
Augustana (SD)	7	–	4	7	–	4
SW Minnesota State	4	–	7	4	–	7
Upper Iowa	1	–	10	1	–	10
+ – Conference co-champions; x – Division champion/co-champions; ^ – NCAA Division II playoff participant; Rankings from AFCA Poll

2022 Rocky Mountain Athletic Conference football standings
	Conf.			Overall
Team	W		L	W		L
No. 2 Colorado Mines $^	9	–	0	13	–	3
CSU Pueblo ^	7	–	2	8	–	4
Western Colorado	7	–	2	7	–	4
South Dakota Mines	6	–	3	7	–	4
Black Hills State	5	–	4	7	–	4
Colorado Mesa	3	–	6	4	–	6
New Mexico Highlands	3	–	6	3	–	7
Chadron State	3	–	6	3	–	8
Adams State	2	–	7	2	–	9
Fort Lewis	0	–	9	0	–	10
$ – Conference champion; ^ – NCAA Division II playoff participant; Rankings from AFCA Poll

== Postseason ==
=== Teams ===
Playoff teams
Super Region	School	Conference	Record	Appearance	Last bid
Super Region 1	IUP	PSAC	9–1	19th	2019
Super Region 1	Shepherd	PSAC	10–1	14th	2021
Super Region 1	Assumption	Northeast-10	8–2	4th	2017
Super Region 1	Ashland	GMAC	9–1	8th	2017
Super Region 1	Notre Dame (OH)	Mountain East	9–2	4th	2021
Super Region 1	Slippery Rock	PSAC	9–2	10th	2021
Super Region 1	New Haven	Northeast-10	8–2	8th	2021
Super Region 2	Benedict	SIAC	10–0	1st	—
Super Region 2	Delta State	GSC	10–1	10th	2017
Super Region 2	West Florida	GSC	9–1	4th	2021
Super Region 2	Virginia Union	CIAA	9–1	10th	2015
Super Region 2	Wingate	SAC	9–2	5th	2019
Super Region 2	Limestone	SAC	8–3	1st	—
Super Region 2	Fayetteville State	CIAA	9–2	4th	2009
Super Region 3	Grand Valley State	GLIAC	11–0	21st	2021
Super Region 3	Ferris State	GLIAC	9–1	13th	2021
Super Region 3	Pittsburg State	MIAA	11–0	19th	2014
Super Region 3	Ouachita Baptist	GAC	11–0	5th	2019
Super Region 3	NW Missouri State	MIAA	9–2	26th	2021
Super Region 3	Indianapolis	GLVC	9–1	7th	2019
Super Region 3	Davenport	GLIAC	8–2	1st	—
Super Region 4	Angelo State	Lone Star	11–0	8th	2021
Super Region 4	Colorado Mines	RMAC	9–2	8th	2021
Super Region 4	Minnesota State	NSIC	9–2	13th	2019
Super Region 4	Bemidji State	NSIC	9–2	2nd	2021
Super Region 4	Winona State	NSIC	8–3	7th	2017
Super Region 4	Wayne State (NE)	NSIC	9–2	2nd	1982
Super Region 4	CSU Pueblo	RMAC	8–3	9th	2019

=== Bracket ===
==== Super Region 1 ====
First Round; November 19, 2022; Campus sites
Notre Dame (OH)	13
4	Ashland*	20
3	Assumption*	14
Slippery Rock	17
New Haven	13
2	Shepherd*	16

Second Round; November 26, 2022; Campus sites
1	IUP*	19
4	Ashland	13
Slippery Rock	27
2	Shepherd*	37

Quarterfinals; December 3, 2022; Campus sites
1	IUP*	13
2	Shepherd	48

==== Super Region 2 ====
First Round; November 19, 2022; Campus sites
Wingate	32
4	Virginia Union*	7
3	West Florida*	45
Limestone	19
Fayetteville State	0
2	Delta State*	51

Second Round; November 26, 2022; Campus sites
1	Benedict*	6
Wingate	23
3	West Florida	38
2	Delta State*	27

Quarterfinals; December 3, 2022; Campus sites
Wingate	14
3	West Florida*	45

==== Super Region 3 ====
First Round; November 19, 2022; Campus sites
NW Missouri State	47
4	Ouachita Baptist*	17
3	Pittsburg State*	35
Indianapolis	0
Davenport	7
2	Ferris State*	41

Second Round; November 26, 2022; Campus sites
1	Grand Valley State*	13
NW Missouri State	8
3	Pittsburg State	14
2	Ferris State*	17

Quarterfinals; December 3, 2022; Campus sites
1	Grand Valley State*	21
2	Ferris State	24

==== Super Region 4 ====
First Round; November 19, 2022; Campus sites
Winona State	7
4	Bemidji State*	31
3	Minnesota State*	26
Wayne State (NE)	9
CSU-Pueblo	24
2	Colorado Mines*	45

Second Round; November 26, 2022; Campus sites
1	Angelo State*	33
4	Bemidji State	7
3	Minnesota State	45
2	Colorado Mines*	48

Quarterfinals; December 3, 2022; Campus sites
1	Angelo State*	24
2	Colorado Mines	42

* - Host school

==== National semifinals ====
Teams that advanced to the semifinals were re-seeded.

Semifinals; December 10; Hosted by higher seeded team
1	Ferris State	38
4	West Florida	17
2	Colorado Mines	44
3	Shepherd	13

National Championship; December 17; McKinney ISD Stadium, McKinney, TX
1	Ferris State	41
2	Colorado Mines	14

== Coaching changes ==
=== End of season ===
This list includes coaching changes announced during the season that did not take effect until the end of the season.

School	Outgoing coach	Date	Reason	Replacement	Previous position
Tuskegee	Reginald Ruffin	June 2, 2022 (effective at season's end)	Retired	Aaron James	Tuskegee offensive coordinator (2022)
Morehouse	Rich Freeman	November 9, 2022	Resigned	Gerard Wilcher	Rice defensive backs (2018–2022)
Missouri Western	Matt Williamson	November 13, 2022	Fired	Tyler Fenwick	Southeastern Oklahoma State head coach (2019–2022)
UNC Pembroke	Shane Richardson	November 13, 2022	Fired	Mark Hall	Chowan head coach (2019–2022)
Catawba	Curtis Walker	November 14, 2022	Resigned	Tyler Haines	Shepherd offensive coordinator and quarterbacks coach (2022)
Sioux Falls	Jon Anderson	November 14, 2022	Fired	Jim Glogowski	Minnesota State defensive coordinator (2016–2022)
Northern Michigan	Kyle Nystrom	November 15, 2022	Resigned	Shane Richardson	UNC Pembroke head coach (2014–2022)
Northwestern Oklahoma State	Matt Walter	November 16, 2022	Resigned	Ronnie Jones	Emerson High School defensive coordinator (2021–2022)
West Texas A&M	Hunter Hughes	November 21, 2022	Fired	Josh Lynn	Nebraska–Kearney head coach (2017–2022)
Texas–Permian Basin	Justin Carrigan	November 28, 2022	Accepted administrative position	Kris McCullough	East Central head coach (2022)
Michigan Tech	Steve Olson	November 29, 2022	Contract expired	Dan Mettlach	Michigan Tech assistant head coach (2019–2022)
Albany State	Gabe Giardina	November 30, 2022	Hired by Charleston Southern	Quinn Gray	Alcorn State quarterbacks coach (2020–2022)
Ashland	Lee Owens	December 2, 2022	Retired	Doug Geiser	Ashland assistant head coach, offensive line coach, and running game coordinator (2004–2022)
Minot State	Mike Aldrich	December 2, 2022	Contract expired	Ian Shields	UNLV offensive assistant (2020–2022)
Northwood	Leonard Haynes	December 5, 2022	Became a part of school's faculty	Dustin Beurer	Albion head coach (2019–2022)
Southeastern Oklahoma State	Tyler Fenwick	December 6, 2022	Hired by Missouri Western	Bo Atterberry	Southeastern Oklahoma State head coach (2014–2018)
Wayne State (MI)	Paul Winters	December 9, 2022	Fired	Tyrone Wheatley	Denver Broncos running backs coach (2022)
West Florida	Pete Shinnick	December 11, 2022	Hired by Towson	Kaleb Nobles	Clemson director of offensive player development (2022)
CSU Pueblo	John Wristen	December 13, 2022	Retired	Phil Vigil	Western New Mexico head coach (2021–2022)
Nebraska–Kearney	Josh Lynn	December 13, 2022	Hired by West Texas A&M	Ryan Held	North Alabama interim head coach (2022)
Chowan	Mark Hall	December 14, 2022	Hired by UNC Pembroke	Paul Johnson	Bloomsburg offensive coordinator, wide receivers coach, and tight ends coach (2021–2022)
Eastern New Mexico	Tye Hiatt	December 21, 2022	Hired by Southern Utah	Kelley Lee	Veterans Memorial Early College High School head coach (2021–2022)
East Central	Kris McCullough	December 22, 2022	Hired by Texas–Permian Basin	John Litrenta	East Central defensive coordinator (2020–2022)
Western New Mexico	Phil Vigil	December 23, 2022	Hired by CSU Pueblo	Bill Hickman	Western New Mexico offensive coordinator (2021–2022)
Southwestern Oklahoma State	Josh Kirkland	January 9, 2023	Hired by North Texas	Ruzell McCoy (interim)	Southwestern Oklahoma State defensive coordinator (2021–2022)
American International	Kris Kulzer	Before January 11, 2023	Resigned or fired	Lou Conte	The Citadel offensive coordinator, quarterbacks coach, and fullbacks coach (2016–2022)
St. Augustine's	David Bowser	January 11, 2023	Resigned	Howard Feggins	Fayetteville State offensive coordinator (2018–2022)
Grand Valley State	Matt Mitchell	January 15, 2023	Hired by Wisconsin	Scott Wooster	Grand Valley State offensive line coach and tight ends coach (2020–2022)
Mary	Craig Bagnell	February 14, 2023	Hired by South Dakota	Shann Schillinger	Mississippi State defensive analyst (2022)
Kentucky State	Paul Hamilton (interim)	February 20, 2023	Full-time coach hired	Felton Huggins	McNeese wide receivers coach (2022)
Bentley	Alvin Reynolds	April 6, 2023	Resigned	Saj Thakkar	Harvard running backs coach (2018–2022)
Colorado Mines	Brandon Moore	April 19, 2023	Hired by San Diego	Pete Sterbick	Colorado Mines offensive coordinator and quarterbacks coach (2019–2022)
William Jewell	Mike McGlinchey Jr.	April 24, 2023	Resigned	Neil Linhart (interim)	William Jewell offensive coordinator (2020–2022)
Concord	Dave Walker	May 12, 2023	Resigned	Brian Ferguson	Concord offensive coordinator and quarterbacks coach (2020–2022)
Lincoln (PA)	Josh Dean	June 23, 2023	Accepted administrative position	Frank Turner	Lincoln (PA) assistant head coach and defensive coordinator (2022)

== See also ==
- 2022 NCAA Division I FBS football season
- 2022 NCAA Division I FCS football season
- 2022 NCAA Division III football season
- 2022 NAIA football season
- 2022 U Sports football season
- 2022 junior college football season
