= 2022 Shepherd Rams football team =

American college football season

2022 Shepherd Rams football

Super Region One champion PSAC East champion

PSAC Championship Game, L 21–24 at IUP

NCAA DII Semifinal, L 13–44 at Colorado Mines
- Conference: Pennsylvania State Athletic Conference
- East Division

Ranking
- AFCA: No. 6
- Record: 13–2 (7–0 PSAC)
- Head coach: Ernie McCook (5th season)
- Offensive coordinator: Tyler Haines (1st season)
- Offensive scheme: Multiple
- Defensive coordinator: Josh Kline (14th season)
- Base defense: 4–2–5
- Home stadium: Ram Stadium

2022 Pennsylvania State Athletic Conference football standings
	Conf.			Overall
Team	W		L	W		L
East Division
No. 6 Shepherd xy^	7	–	0	13	–	2
Kutztown	5	–	2	8	–	3
West Chester	4	–	3	7	–	4
Millersville	4	–	3	5	–	6
Shippensburg	3	–	4	5	–	6
East Stroudsburg	3	–	4	4	–	7
Bloomsburg	2	–	5	4	–	7
Lock Haven	0	–	7	1	–	10
West Division
No. 11 IUP xy$^	6	–	1	10	–	2
No. 16 Slippery Rock x^	6	–	1	10	–	3
Gannon x	6	–	1	8	–	3
California (PA)	4	–	3	6	–	5
Edinboro	2	–	5	5	–	6
Clarion	2	–	5	3	–	8
Seton Hill	2	–	5	2	–	9
Mercyhurst	0	–	7	2	–	9
Championship: IUP 24, Shepherd 21
$ – Conference champion; x – Division champion/co-champions; y – Championship game participant; ^ – NCAA Division II playoff participant; Rankings from AFCA poll

The 2022 Shepherd Rams football team represented Shepherd University as a member of the East Division of the Pennsylvania State Athletic Conference (PSAC) during the 2022 NCAA Division II football season. Led by fifth-year head coach Ernie McCook, the Rams compiled an overall record of 13–2 with a mark of 7–0 in conference play, winning the PSAC East Division title. Shepherd lost the PSAC Championship Game to West Division champion IUP. The Rams advanced to the NCAA Division II Football Championship playoffs, where they beat New Haven in the first round, Slippery Rock in the second round, and IUP in the quarterfinal, before falling to Colorado Mines in the semifinals. The team played home games at Ram Stadium in Shepherdstown, West Virginia. The 2022 season was the third for the Rams as a member of the PSAC after joining the conference in 2019.

== Offseason ==
=== Coaching changes ===
The following coaches left the football program:

- Defensive line coach Ramal Faunteroy left for a position at Morgan State.

The following coaches joined the football program:

- Levern Belin was hired as the defensive line coach.

=== Additions ===
==== Recruiting class ====
Player	Pos.	Height	Weight	Hometown	High school
Derick Adames	DB	5 ft 11 in	170 lbs	Germantown, MD	Northwest High School
Ryan Adams	DL	6 ft 3 in	290 lbs	Woodbridge, VA	Gar-Field Senior High School
Riley Ambrose	WR	6 ft 2 in	180 lbs	Baltimore, MD	Fork Union Military Academy
Jaden Bacon	RB	6 ft 0 in	180 lbs	Hyattsville, MD	DeMatha Catholic High School
Matthew Benny	OL	6 ft 2 in	300 lbs	Severn, MD	Archbishop Spalding High School
Kelvon Bethea	DL	6 ft 4 in	220 lbs	Norfolk, VA	Oscar F. Smith High School
James Bozek	K	6 ft 3 in	195 lbs	Alexandria, VA	Hayfield Secondary School
Tylek Bright	RB	6 ft 0 in	185 lbs	Germantown, MD	Seneca Valley High School
Dominic Busky	FB	6 ft 2 in	230 lbs	Martinsburg, WV	DeMatha Catholic High School
Cameron Dorner	WR	6 ft 2 in	180 lbs	New Market, MD	Oakdale High School
Trey Duke	DB	5 ft 10 in	160 lbs	Alexandria, VA	St. Stephen's & St. Agnes School
Jahmal Edwards	RB	6 ft 0 in	185 lbs	Washington, D.C.	Theodore Roosevelt High School
Will Ennis	WR	6 ft 0 in	180 lbs	Severn, MD	Old Mill High School
Vince Flook	DL	6 ft 5 in	220 lbs	Middletown, MD	Middletown High School
Amir Frye	DL	6 ft 3 in	230 lbs	Bethesda, MD	Walter Johnson High School
Daryl Harper	WR	6 ft 2 in	170 lbs	Montgomery Village, MD	Northwest High School
Robert Hart	DB	6 ft 0 in	180 lbs	Laurel, MD	DeMatha Catholic High School
Tyler Hove	OL	6 ft 5 in	316 lbs	Frederick, MD	Frederick High School
Brian Jester	TE	6 ft 4 in	245 lbs	Baltimore, MD	St. Frances Academy
Mujahid Johnson	DB	6 ft 0 in	185 lbs	Frederick, MD	Northwest High School
Sekou Kamara	DB	6 ft 1 in	180 lbs	Gaithersburg, MD	Quince Orchard High School
J. T. Yao Kouame	LB	6 ft 0 in	210 lbs	Chantilly, VA	Westfield High School
Caysen Lanza	TE	6 ft 5 in	220 lbs	Charles Town, WV	Jefferson High School
Daniel McPherson	DL	6 ft 0 in	265 lbs	Columbia, MD	Howard High School
Lucas Michael	OL	6 ft 2 in	265 lbs	Williamsport, MD	Williamsport High School
Marcus Nicholson	DB	6 ft 1 in	175 lbs	Baltimore, MD	Dundalk High School
Kaylen Perez	LB	6 ft 0 in	220 lbs	Waldorf, MD	St. Mary's Ryken High School
Nehemiah Phillips	DB	6 ft 0 in	180 lbs	Washington, D.C.	Theodore Roosevelt High School
Elijah Queen	DL	6 ft 2 in	230 lbs	Columbia, MD	Wilde Lake High School
Sammy Roberts	QB	6 ft 2 in	205 lbs	Harpers Ferry, WV	Jefferson High School
Jason Robertson	DL	6 ft 4 in	220 lbs	Baltimore, MD	Archbishop Spalding High School
Jalil Singleton	DB	5 ft 10 in	170 lbs	Woodbridge, VA	Gar-Field Senior High School
Christian Slack	DL	6 ft 0 in	260 lbs	Martinsburg, WV	Martinsburg High School
Colby Strange	TE	6 ft 6 in	215 lbs	Davidsonville, MD	South River High School
Omari Terry	DB	5 ft 10 in	185 lbs	Baltimore, MD	St. Frances Academy
Gavin Whittington	RB	5 ft 11 in	195 lbs	Huntingtown, MD	Northern High School
Antonio Wilkins	DB	5 ft 11 in	160 lbs	Washington, D.C.	Theodore Roosevelt High School
Jayson Williams	OL	6 ft 2 in	295 lbs	Waynesboro, VA	Stuarts Draft High School

==== Incoming transfers ====
Player	Pos.	Height	Weight	Year	Hometown	Previous school
Dewayne Grantham	DB	6 ft 0 in	205 lbs	Junior	Martinsburg, WV	Lackawanna College
Darryl Overton III	LB	6 ft 2 in	230 lbs	Sophomore	Woodbridge, VA	Virginia Military Institute

== Preseason ==
=== Media day ===
Media poll (East Division)
Predicted finish	Team (1st place votes)
1	Shepherd (4)
2	Kutztown (4)
3	West Chester
4	Shippensburg
5	East Stroudsburg
6	Bloomsburg
7	Millersville
8	Lock Haven

== Personnel ==
2022 Shepherd Rams football team roster
Players
Coaches
Offense

Pos.	#	Name	Class
WR	0	Alphonso Foray	Jr
WR	1	E. J. Morgan	Jr
QB	2	Tyson Bagent	Sr
RB	30	Ronnie Brown	Jr
OL	76	Joey Fisher	Sr

Defense

Pos.	#	Name	Class

Special teams

Pos.	#	Name	Class

Head coach

- Ernie McCook

Coordinators/assistant coaches

- Tyler Haines
- Josh Kline

Legend

- (C) Team captain
- (S) Suspended
- (I) Ineligible
- Injured
- Redshirt

Roster
Last update: May 3, 2024

== Schedule ==
Date	Time	Opponent	Rank	Site	Result	Attendance	Source
September 1	7:00 p.m.	at Southern Connecticut*	No. 6	Jess Dow Field; New Haven, CT	W 48–7	3,142	
September 10	12:00 p.m.	Edinboro*	No. 5	Ram Stadium; Shepherdstown, WV	W 41–7	4,452	
September 17	12:00 p.m.	California (PA)*	No. 4	Ram Stadium; Shepherdstown, WV	W 26–23 ^{OT}	5,634	
September 24	12:00 p.m.	at Kutztown	No. 5	Andre Reed Stadium; Kutztown, PA	W 42–35	4,824	
October 1	1:00 p.m.	at Shippensburg	No. 4	Seth Grove Stadium; Shippensburg, PA	W 30–13	876	
October 8	12:00 p.m.	Lock Haven	No. 4	Ram Stadium; Shepherdstown, WV	W 72–7	5,251	
October 15	12:00 p.m.	Millersville^{†}	No. 4	Ram Stadium; Shepherdstown, WV	W 55–17	6,471	
October 22	12:00 p.m.	at West Chester	No. 3	John A. Farrell Stadium; West Chester, PA	W 47–17	2,123	
October 29	12:00 p.m.	Bloomsburg	No. 3	Ram Stadium; Shepherdstown, WV	W 55–10	5,274	
November 5	1:05 p.m.	at East Stroudsburg	No. 3	Eiler-Martin Stadium; East Stroudsburg, PA	W 37–14	2,109	
November 12	3:00 p.m.	at No. 19 IUP*	No. 3	Miller Stadium; Indiana, PA (PSAC Championship)	L 21–24	3,878	
November 19	12:00 p.m.	New Haven*	No. 11	Ram Stadium; Shepherdstown, WV (NCAA DII First Round)	W 16–13	4,871	
November 26	12:00 p.m.	No. 20 Slippery Rock*	No. 11	Ram Stadium; Shepherdstown, WV (NCAA DII Second Round)	W 37–27	5,291	
December 3	1:00 p.m.	at No. 15 IUP*	No. 11	Miller Stadium; Indiana, PA (NCAA DII Quarterfinals)	W 48–13	1,389	
December 10	1:30 p.m.	at No. 10 Colorado Mines*	No. 11	Campbell Field; Golden, CO (NCAA DII Semifinals)	L 13–44	6,191	
*Non-conference game; ^{†}Homecoming; Rankings from AFCA Poll – Released prior to game; All times are in Eastern time

== Statistics ==
=== Individual statistics ===
==== Offense ====
Passing statistics
#	Player	GP	Cmp	Att	Pct	Yds	Avg	TD	Int	Rtg
2	Tyson Bagent	15	400	572	69.9	4,580	8.0	41	8	158.1
16	Christian Etchison	5	4	4	100.0	85	21.3	1	0	361.0
18	Lek Powell	1	3	4	75.0	23	5.8	0	0	123.3
	Team	14	0	2	0.0	0	0.0	0	0	0.0
	Totals	15	407	582	69.3	4,688	8.1	42	8	158.7
	Opponents	15	284	492	57.7	3,325	6.8	26	18	124.6

Rushing statistics
#	Player	GP	Att	Yds	Avg	Lng	TD	Y/G
30	Ronnie Brown	15	219	1,863	8.5	85	19	124.2
8	Blake Hartman	11	52	379	7.3	80	4	34.5
6	Avaughn Holley	11	40	221	5.5	53	2	20.1
10	Nazhir Russell	4	9	91	10.1	53	2	22.8
2	Tyson Bagent	15	79	71	0.9	28	5	4.7
16	Christian Etchison	5	4	28	7.0	19	0	5.6
9	Ryan Beach	11	4	13	3.3	8	0	1.2
76	Joey Fisher	8	0	4	0.0	0	0	0.5
	Team	14	12	–20	–1.7	0	0	–1.4
	Totals	15	419	2,650	6.3	85	32	176.7
	Opponents	15	449	1,278	2.8	80	8	85.2

Receiving statistics
#	Player	GP	Rec	Yds	Avg	Lng	TD	Y/G
13	Marlon Cook	14	68	1,030	15.2	70	8	73.8
87	Brian Walker	15	63	799	12.7	36	5	53.8
30	Ronnie Brown	15	56	589	10.5	73	5	39.3
3	Rodney Dorsey	15	35	487	13.9	71	4	32.5
9	Ryan Beach	11	51	411	8.1	35	5	37.4
1	E. J. Morgan	11	25	308	12.3	31	2	28.0
81	Cameron Dorner	14	34	299	8.8	29	3	21.4
0	Alphonso Foray	15	25	293	11.7	47	4	19.5
23	Max Fisher	8	20	168	8.4	23	0	21.0
7	Kenny Edelin	12	15	158	10.5	41	2	13.2
83	Daryl Harper	5	7	115	16.4	60	1	23.0
86	Ethan Krolow	3	1	11	11.0	11	0	3.7
8	Blake Hartman	11	2	8	4.0	6	0	0.7
47	Michael McCook	12	4	7	1.8	4	3	0.6
10	Nazhir Russell	4	1	5	5.0	5	0	1.3
	Totals	15	407	4,688	11.5	73	42	312.5
	Opponents	15	284	3,339	11.8	64	26	222.6

==== Special teams ====
Kickoff statistics
#	Player	GP	KO	Yds	Avg	TB	OB
34	Jacob Haynie	15	93	5,007	53.8	16	1
69	James Bozek	4	9	444	49.3	0	0
	Totals	15	102	5,451	53.4	16	1
	Opponents	15	57	3,292	57.8	17	2

Kicking statistics
#	Player	GP	XPM–XPA	XP%	FGM–FGA	FG%	Lng	Pts
34	Jacob Haynie	15	67–75	89.3	10–16	62.5	44	97
	Totals	15	67–75	89.3	10–16	62.5	44	97
	Opponents	15	0–0	0.0	0–0	0.0	0	0

Punting statistics
#	Player	GP	Punts	Yds	Avg	Lng	TB	In20
66	Ryan Barrick	15	41	1,488	36.3	50	3	10
2	Tyson Bagent	15	3	128	42.7	45	2	1
	Totals	15	44	1,616	36.7	50	5	11
	Opponents	15	79	2,895	36.7	63	4	14

Kick return statistics
#	Player	GP	Ret	Yds	Avg	Lng	TD
30	Ronnie Brown	15	19	546	28.7	100	1
0	Alphonso Foray	15	9	172	19.1	38	0
8	Blake Hartman	11	1	23	23.0	23	0
5	Klayton Batten	15	2	22	11.0	20	0
88	Dustin Fisher	12	1	7	7.0	7	0
44	Jack Rosnage	13	1	0	0.0	0	0
	Totals	15	33	770	23.3	100	1
	Opponents	15	73	1,131	15.5	60	0

== Awards and honors ==
=== National awards and honors ===
NCAA Division II All-American Honors
Player	Position	AFCA	AP	D2CCA	DH
Tyson Bagent	QB	First	Second	Second	Second
Ronnie Brown	RB	—	First	Second	—
Brian Walker	TE	—	First	First	First
Joey Fisher	OL	First	First	First	Second
Kyle Smith	DE	—	Second	—	—

=== Regional awards and honors ===
Super Region One Individual Yearly Awards
Awards	Player	Position	Date awarded	Ref.
D2CCA Regional Offensive Player of the Year	Tyson Bagent	QB	December 1, 2022	
AFCA Regional Coach of the Year	Ernie McCook	HC	December 6, 2022	

Super Region One All-Regional Team
Team	Player	Position	Class	Ref.
First	Tyson Bagent	QB	Senior	
First	Ronnie Brown	RB	Junior	
First	Brian Walker	TE	Senior	
First	Joey Fisher	OL	Senior	
First	Kyle Smith	DL	Graduate	

=== Conference awards and honors ===
PSAC Individual Yearly Awards
Awards	Player	Position	Date awarded	Ref.
PSAC East Offensive Athlete of the Year	Tyson Bagent	QB	November 16, 2022	
PSAC East Coach of the Year	Ernie McCook	HC	November 16, 2022	
PSAC Champion Scholar	Adam Stilley	OL	November 15, 2022	

PSAC All-Conference Honors
Team	Player	Position	Class	Ref.
First	Tyson Bagent	QB	Senior	
First	Ronnie Brown	RB	Junior	
First	Ryan Beach	WR	Sophomore	
First	Marlon Cook	WR	Junior	
First	Brian Walker	TE	Senior	
First	Joey Fisher	OL	Senior	
First	Ty Lucas	OL	Freshman	
First	Malik Holloway	DL	Sophomore	
First	Kyle Smith	DL	Graduate	
First	DeWayne Grantham	LB	Junior	
First	Klayton Batten	DB	Sophomore	
First	Keyshawn Hailey	DB	Junior	
First	Ronnie Brown	RS	Junior	
Second	Chandler Brown	OL	Freshman	
Second	Wyatt Pellicano	OL	Sophomore	
Second	Adam Stilley	C	Graduate	
Second	Solomon Alexander	DL	Graduate	
Second	Jurnee Dunbar	DL	Sophomore	

PSAC Weekly Honors
Honors	Player	Position	Date Awarded	Ref.
PSAC East Offensive Athlete of the Week	Tyson Bagent	QB	September 5, 2022	
PSAC East Defensive Athlete of the Week	Dewayne Grantham	LB	September 5, 2022	
PSAC East Offensive Athlete of the Week	Ronnie Brown	RB	September 12, 2022	
PSAC East Defensive Athlete of the Week	Malik Holloway	DE	September 12, 2022	
PSAC East Offensive Athlete of the Week	Tyson Bagent	QB	September 19, 2022	
PSAC East Offensive Athlete of the Week	Tyson Bagent	QB	September 26, 2022	
PSAC East Special Teams Athlete of the Week	Ronnie Brown	KR	September 26, 2022	
PSAC East Offensive Athlete of the Week	Ronnie Brown	RB	October 3, 2022	
PSAC East Defensive Athlete of the Week	Donte Harrison	DB	October 17, 2022	
PSAC East Offensive Athlete of the Week	Tyson Bagent	QB	October 24, 2022	
PSAC East Defensive Athlete of the Week	Dewayne Grantham	LB	October 24, 2022	
PSAC East Offensive Athlete of the Week	Tyson Bagent	QB	October 31, 2022	
PSAC East Offensive Athlete of the Week	Tyson Bagent	QB	November 7, 2022	

== Rankings ==
Ranking movements Legend: ██ Increase in ranking ██ Decrease in ranking
	Week												
Poll	Pre	1	2	3	4	5	6	7	8	9	10	11	Final
AFCA	6	5	4	5	4	4	4	3	3	3	3	11	6
D2Football.com	6	5	5	5	5	5	5	6	6	6	6	9	8
