= Jermaine Gales =

American football coach (born c. 1975)

Current position
- Title: Associate head coach & offensive coordinator
- Team: Waldorf
- Conference: GPAC

Biographical details
- Born: c. 1975 (age 50–51); Walnut, California, U.S.
- Education: Mt. San Antonio College (1995); Southern Arkansas University (2002, 2005)

Playing career
- 1994–1995: Mt. San Antonio
- 1996–1997: Southern Arkansas
- Position: Wide receiver

Coaching career (HC unless noted)
- 2003–2005: Southern Arkansas (WR)
- 2006–2009: Mars Hill (WR)
- 2010–2012: St. Augustine's (OC/RB)
- 2013–2015: Mars Hill (WR)
- 2016–2017: North Carolina Central (WR)
- 2018–2019: Arkansas–Pine Bluff (OC)
- 2020–2021: Bluefield State (AHC/OC/QB)
- 2022–2023: Lincoln (MO)
- 2024–2025: Alcorn State (OC/QB)
- 2026–present: Waldorf (AHC/OC)

Head coaching record
- Overall: 0–22

Jermaine Gales (born c. 1975) is an American college football coach. He is the associate head football coach and offensive coordinator for Waldorf University, positions he has held since 2026. He was the head football coach for Lincoln University in Jefferson City, Missouri, from 2022 to 2023. He also coached for Southern Arkansas, Mars Hill, St. Augustine's, North Carolina Central, Arkansas–Pine Bluff, Bluefield State, and Alcorn State. He played college football for Mt. San Antonio and Southern Arkansas as a wide receiver.

== Head coaching record ==
Year	Team	Overall	Conference	Standing	Bowl/playoffs
Lincoln Blue Tigers (Mid-America Intercollegiate Athletics Association) (2022)
2022	Lincoln	0–11	0–11	12th	
Lincoln Blue Tigers (NCAA Division II independent) (2023)
2023	Lincoln	0–11			
Lincoln:		0–22	0–11		
Total:		0–22			
