= UNC Pembroke Braves =

- University: University of North Carolina at Pembroke
- Nickname: Braves
- NCAA: Division II
- Conference: Conference Carolinas (primary); MEC (football)
- Athletic director: Scott Byrd
- Location: Pembroke, North Carolina
- Varsity teams: 14 (6 men's, 8 women's)
- Football stadium: Grace P. Johnson Stadium
- Basketball arena: Lumbee Guaranty Bank Court
- Baseball stadium: Sammy Cox Field
- Softball stadium: UNCP Softball Field
- Soccer stadium: Lumbee River EMC Stadium
- Aquatics center: Aquatic Center
- Colors: Black and gold
- Website: uncpbraves.com
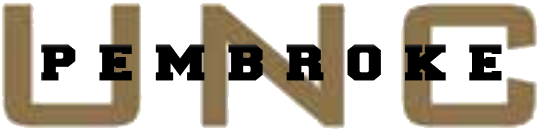

The UNC Pembroke Braves are the athletic teams that represent the University of North Carolina at Pembroke, located in Pembroke, North Carolina, in NCAA Division II intercollegiate sports.

The Braves compete as members of Conference Carolinas (CC) for all but one of their 16 varsity sports. The exception, football, has competed in the Mountain East Conference (MEC) since 2020–21. Before the Braves' move to CC, they had also been a member of the MEC in indoor track & field, swimming & diving, and wrestling since 2019–20.

In July 2021, UNCP re-joined CC after an absence of nearly 30 years. The school had been a CC member from 1976–77 to 1991–92 under its former name of Pembroke State University; back when CC was known as the Carolinas Intercollegiate Athletic Conference (CIAC). The Braves also competed as members of the Peach Belt Conference from 1992–93 to 2020–21.

== History ==
UNC Pembroke's athletic teams are known as the Braves. Due to its heritage as an institution founded for the benefit of American Indians and support from the Lumbee Tribe of North Carolina, the school has largely been immune to the ongoing controversies related to American Indian-themed nicknames and mascots.

== Conference affiliations ==
NCAA

- Conference Carolinas (1976–1992, 2021–present)
- Peach Belt Conference (1992–2021)

== Sports sponsored ==
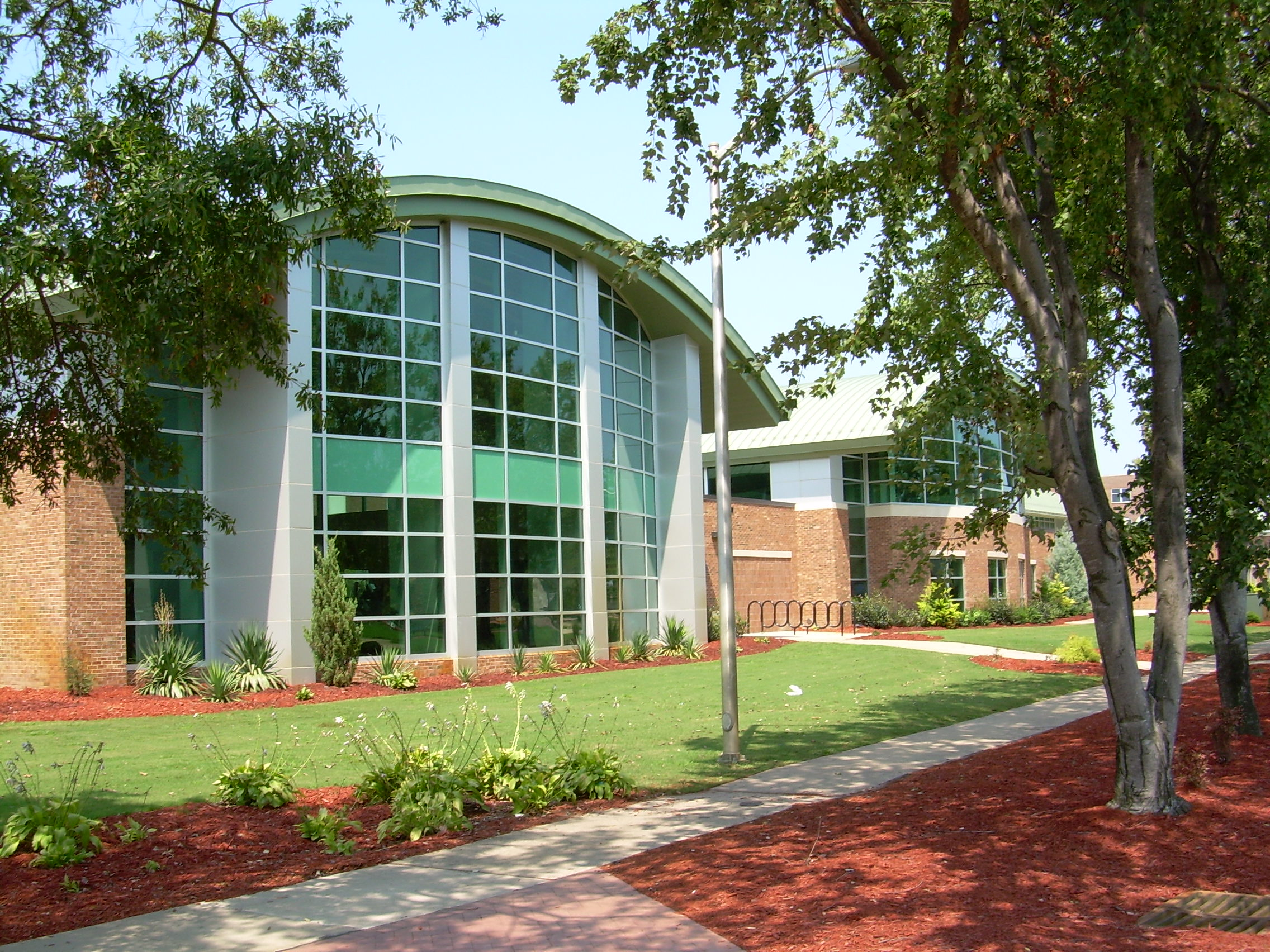
English E. Jones Athletic Center

Men's sports	Wome's sports
Baseball	Basketball
Basketball	Cross country
Cross country	Golf
Football	Soccer
Track and field	Softball
Wrestling	Swimming
	Track and field
	Volleyball

== Championships ==
=== Team national championships ===
Sport	Association	Division	Year	Opponent/Runner-up	Score
Men's cross country (1)	NAIA	Single	1978	Saginaw Valley State	126–147
