= Ron Brown Jr. =

American football player (born 2000)

Arizona Rattlers
- Positions: Running back, Kick returner, Punt returner
- CFL status: American

Personal information
- Born: April 12, 2000 (age 26); Baltimore, Maryland, U.S.
- Listed height: 5 ft 11 in (1.80 m)
- Listed weight: 192 lb (87 kg)

Career information
- High school: Dundalk (Baltimore, Maryland)
- College: Shepherd (2019–2022)

Career history
- 2023: Tampa Bay Buccaneers*
- 2024: Winnipeg Blue Bombers*
- 2024: Ottawa Redblacks*
- 2025–present: Arizona Rattlers
- * Offseason or practice squad member only

Awards and highlights
- IFL Offensive Rookie of the Year (2025); IFL All-Rookie Team (2025); AP First-team All-American (2022); D2CCA Second-team All-American (2022); 3× First-team All-PSAC East (2021, 2022 (Note: Selected as a running back and return specialist))

Ronnie Brown Jr. (born April 12, 2000) is an American professional football running back and return specialist for the Arizona Rattlers of the Indoor Football League (IFL). He played college football for the Shepherd Rams before signing with the Tampa Bay Buccaneers as an undrafted free agent in 2023.

== Early life ==
Brown grew up in Baltimore, Maryland and attended Dundalk High School. He would commit to play college football at Shepherd University.

== College career ==
=== 2019 season ===
Brown joined the Shepherd Rams in 2019 and made his college football debut against Mercyhurst. During the game, Brown had three carries for 12 yards while returning two kicks for 44 yards. Against Lock Haven, Brown scored his first career rushing touchdown while also tallying a career-high 14 carries for 96 rushing yards. A week later, Brown had six kick returns for a career-high 105 yards against Shippensburg. In a blowout win against East Stroudsburg, Brown had his first multi-touchdown game, rushing for both on 12 carries for 80 yards.

Shepherd ended the season with a 9–2 (6–1) record, finishing second in the Pennsylvania State Athletic Conference (PSAC) East Division. They would advance to the 2019 NCAA Division II playoffs as the 5th seed in Super Region One. During both of their playoff games, Brown had 100+ kick return yards but didn't record a single carry.

Brown finished the season with 41 carries for 209 yards and three touchdowns. He also had 28 kick returns for 668 yards.

=== 2020 season ===
Due to the COVID-19 pandemic, the PSAC suspended the 2020 fall season and opted out of in-conference play during the 2021 spring season. On April 10, 2021, Shepherd played Mercyhurst for their only game of the season. Brown had four carries for 13 yards and one reception for seven yards during the game.

=== 2021 season ===
Brown started the 2021 season against Ohio Dominican, finishing with eight carries for 71 yards and a touchdown as well as four receptions for 59 yards. The next week against Gannon, he had five carries for 72 yards and a touchdown.

=== 2022 season ===
Brown was promoted to being the starter before the 2022 season. In his first start against Southern Connecticut State, Brown had 10 carries for 113 yards and two touchdowns. Brown had a career performance the next week against Edinboro, rushing for 278 yards and three touchdowns, earning his first career PSAC East Offensive Athlete of the Week award for his performance. Against Kutztown, Brown returned a kickoff for a 100-yard touchdown, breaking the school record for longest return in the process. He would then earn PSAC East Special Teams Player of the Week honors. Against Shippensburg, Brown had 196 all-purpose yards and two rushing touchdowns. He then earned his second PSAC East Offensive Athlete of the Week award.

After finishing the regular season with a perfect 10–0 (7–0) record, Shepherd would win its first-ever PSAC East title, advancing to the PSAC Championship Game against No. 19 IUP. During the game, Brown rushed for a touchdown, but they would fall 24–21. On November 16, Brown earned his second-straight All-PSAC First Team selection as a running back and return specialist.

Shepherd was then granted the No. 2 seed in Super Region One for the NCAA Division II playoffs. In the First Round against New Haven, Brown had 21 carries for 228 yards and two touchdowns in the 16–13 win. Brown proved even more effective in the Second Round matchup against No. 20 Slippery Rock, finishing with 23 touches for 270 all-purpose yards and two total touchdowns, helping Shepherd advance with a 37–27 win. The Super Region One Championship would be a PSAC Championship rematch against No. 15 IUP. Brown would get 29 touches in the game for 161 all-purpose yards and three total touchdowns. Shepherd would capture their second straight Super Region One title with a 48–13 revenge victory. During Regional play, Brown had 80 touches for 718 all-purpose yards and seven total touchdowns, earning him D2CCA All-Region First Team honors. Shepherd was granted the No. 3 seed in the National Semifinals, matching up against No. 10 Colorado Mines. During the game, Brown had 17 carries for 173 yards and a touchdown but the Rams would be eliminated 44–13.

Brown finished the season ranking first in all-purpose yards (2,999) and yards per carry (8.47), second in rushing yards (1,864) and all-purpose yards per game (199.93), fourth in rushing attempts (220) and total touches (295), fifth in total touchdowns (25) and total points scored (150), sixth in rushing touchdowns (19), eighth in total points per game (10.0), and ninth in rushing yards per game (124.3). For this, Brown was awarded Division II All-American First Team honors by the Associated Press, Second Team honors by the D2CCA, and an honorable mention by the Don Hansen Football Committee. He was also named to the D2Football.com Elite 100 Second Team.

Brown was selected to be a part of the 2022 NFLPA Collegiate Bowl after the season. He then declared for the 2023 NFL draft on December 17.

=== College statistics ===
Year	Team	Games		Rushing				Receiving				Kick returns				All-purpose	
Year	Team	GP	GS	Att	Yds	Avg	TD	Rec	Yds	Avg	TD	Ret	Yds	Avg	TD	Yds	TD
2019	Shepherd	10	0	41	209	5.1	3	1	13	13.0	0	28	668	23.9	0	890	3
2020	Shepherd	1	0	4	13	3.3	0	1	7	7.0	0	—	—	—	—	20	0
2021	Shepherd	15	15	107	962	9.0	8	23	549	23.9	6	12	190	15.8	0	1,695	14
2022	Shepherd	15	15	220	1,864	8.5	19	56	589	10.5	5	19	546	28.7	1	2,999	25
Career		41	30	372	3,048	8.2	30	81	1,158	14.3	11	59	1,404	23.8	1	5,604	42

=== Records ===
==== PSAC records ====
- Highest average yards per carry in a career (min. 3,000 yards): 8.2 (2019–2022)
- Highest average yards per carry in a single season (min. 1,400 yards): 8.5 – tied (2022)

==== Shepherd records ====
- Highest average yards per carry in a career (min. 2 years and 100 carries): 8.19 (2019–2022)
- Most all-purpose yards in a single season: 2,999 yards (2022)
- Highest average yards per carry in a single season (min. 70 carries): 9.01 (2021)
- Most kickoff return touchdowns in a single game: 1 – tied (September 24, 2022, vs. Kutztown)
- Longest kickoff return touchdown: 100 yards (September 24, 2022, vs. Kutztown)

== Professional career ==
Pre-draft measurables
Height	Weight	Arm length	Hand span	40-yard dash	10-yard split	20-yard split	20-yard shuttle	Three-cone drill	Vertical jump	Broad jump	Bench press
5 ft 10.7 in (1.80 m)	192 lb (87 kg)	30 3/8 in (0.77 m)	8 1/2 in (0.22 m)	4.46 s	1.50 s	2.53 s	4.00 s	6.89 s	37 in (0.94 m)	10 ft 3 in (3.12 m)	15 reps
All values from Pro Day

=== Tampa Bay Buccaneers ===
On May 12, 2023, Brown signed with the Tampa Bay Buccaneers of the National Football League (NFL) as an undrafted free agent. Brown played all three preseason games, racking up 12 carries for 33 yards while also having three catches for 38 yards. On August 28, Brown was waived.

=== Winnipeg Blue Bombers ===
On January 5, 2024, Brown signed with the Winnipeg Blue Bombers of the Canadian Football League (CFL). On May 15, Brown was released.

=== Ottawa Redblacks ===
On May 16, 2024, Brown signed with the Ottawa Redblacks of the CFL. On June 1, Brown was released.

=== Arizona Rattlers ===
On November 17, 2024, Brown signed with the Arizona Rattlers of the Indoor Football League (IFL). Brown made his debut on March 30 against the Tucson Sugar Skulls, rushing for 17 yards and having a reception for five yards. On April 6 against the Green Bay Blizzard, Brown scored his first rushing touchdown while also having 126 total yards (53 rushing, 73 receiving). A week later against the San Antonio Gunslingers, Brown rushed for 63 yards and four touchdowns in the Rattlers' 63–55 win.
