= Josh Dean =

Josh or Joshua Dean may refer to:

- Josh Dean (actor), Canadian actor and improvisor
- Josh Dean (American football), American football coach and player
- Josh Dean (politician) (born 2000), British politician
- Joshua Dean (whistleblower) (1978–2024), American whistleblower
- Josh Dean (writer), American podcaster and author
