= Shane Richardson =

Shane Richardson may refer to:

- Shane Richardson (rugby league), Australian rugby league administrator
- Shane Richardson (American football), American football coach and player
- India Ferrah, American drag queen born Shane Richardson
