= Aubrey Miller Jr. =

American gridiron football linebacker (born 1999)

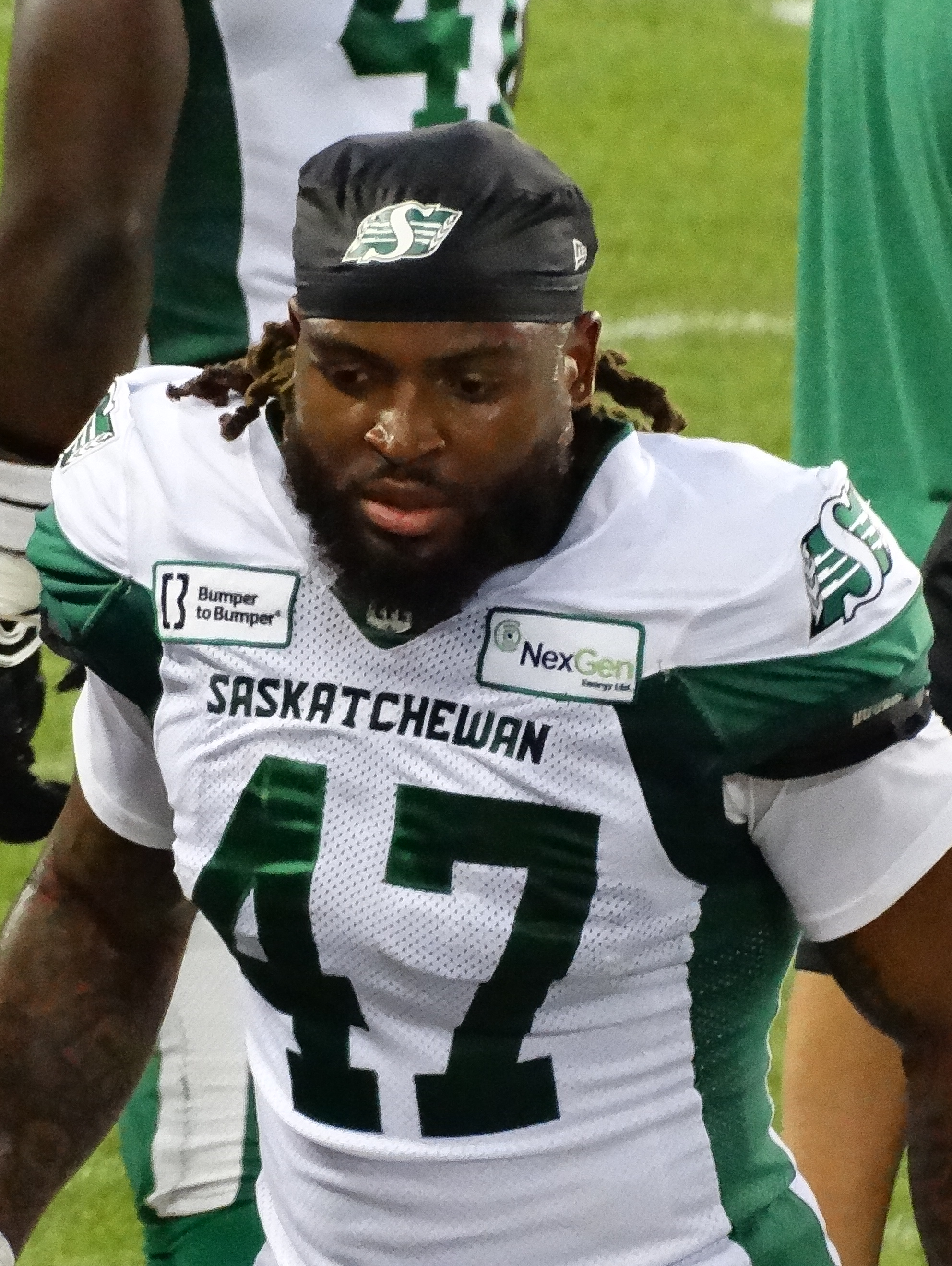
- Miller with the Saskatchewan Roughriders in 2024

No. 47 – Saskatchewan Roughriders
- Position: Linebacker
- Roster status: Active
- CFL status: American

Personal information
- Born: April 24, 1999 (age 27); Memphis, Tennessee, U.S.
- Listed height: 6 ft 2 in (1.88 m)
- Listed weight: 225 lb (102 kg)

Career information
- High school: Whitehaven (Memphis)
- College: Missouri (2017–2019); Jackson State (2020–2022)
- NFL draft: 2023: undrafted

Career history
- Miami Dolphins (2023)*; Edmonton Elks (2024); Saskatchewan Roughriders (2024–present)
- * Offseason or practice squad member only

Awards and highlights
- Grey Cup champion (2025); SWAC Defensive Player of the Year (2022); First-team All-SWAC (2021)
- Stats at Pro Football Reference
- Stats at CFL.ca

Aubrey Miller Jr. (born April 24, 1999) is an American professional football linebacker for the Saskatchewan Roughriders of the Canadian Football League (CFL). He played college football for the Missouri Tigers and at Jackson State.

== Early life ==
Miller grew up in Memphis, Tennessee and attended Whitehaven High School. At Whitehaven, he helped the football team win their second state championship and a 15–0 record during his senior year in 2016. He finished his senior season with earning All-Region 6A, All-Shelby Metro Team, All-Tennessee Team, Autozone Liberty Bowl Defensive Player of the Year and Tennessee Titan Mr. Football Class 6A Lineman. He was a four-star rated recruit and committed to play college football at the University of Missouri over offers from Arkansas State, Cincinnati, Colorado State, Iowa State, Jackson State, Jacksonville State, Louisville, Memphis, Middle Tennessee State, Ohio, Toledo, UTSA and Western Kentucky.

== College career ==
=== Missouri ===
During Miller's true freshman season in 2017, he played in 10 games after missing three of them early in the season due to a leg injury and coming back for the homecoming game against Idaho. He finished the season with making a tackle against Idaho and a pair of solo tackles against Tennessee. During the 2018 season, he played in 10 games, finishing the season with making a pair of stops and a pair of solo tackles. During the 2019 season, he would only play in one game before suffering a knee injury early in the season where he made a pair of tackles during the season-opener against Wyoming.

With only playing one game in the 2020 season, Miller would later announce that he would enter the NCAA transfer portal.

=== Jackson State ===
On December 13, 2020, Miller announced that he would transfer to Jackson State.

During the 2020-21 season, he played in and started five games, finishing the season with 51 total tackles (30 solo and 21 assisted), 4.5 tackles for loss, 1.5 sacks and one forced fumble. During the 2021 season, he played in and started all 13 games and was named the SWAC Defensive Player of the Week after playing against Florida A&M in the Orange Blossom Classic. He finished the season with 109 total tackles (53 solo and 56 assisted), 11.5 tackles for loss for 62 yards, 6.5 sacks for 55 yards, three pass breakups, one forced fumble and one fumble recovery. During the 2022 season, he played in all 13 games and was also named as a finalist for the Buck Buchanan Award. He finished the season with 117 total tackles (64 solo and 53 assisted), 12 tackles for loss for 36 yards, two sacks for 17 yards, six pass breakups, five forced fumbles and two fumble recoveries.

On November 14, 2022, Miller was invited to play for the 2023 Senior Bowl.

== Professional career ==
Pre-draft measurables
Height	Weight	Arm length	Hand span	Wingspan	40-yard dash	10-yard split	20-yard split	20-yard shuttle	Three-cone drill	Vertical jump	Broad jump	Bench press
5 ft 11 1/4 in (1.81 m)	229 lb (104 kg)	31 in (0.79 m)	8 3/4 in (0.22 m)	6 ft 3 7/8 in (1.93 m)	4.71 s	1.66 s	2.76 s	4.60 s	7.30 s	35.5 in (0.90 m)	9 ft 7 in (2.92 m)	23 reps
All values from Pro Day

=== Miami Dolphins ===
After going undrafted in the 2023 NFL draft, Miller signed with the Miami Dolphins on May 12, 2023. He was waived on August 28, 2023.

=== Edmonton Elks ===
On June 24, 2024, Miller was signed to the Edmonton Elks. He played in four games, recording five tackles, before being released on July 21, 2024.

=== Saskatchewan Roughriders ===
On August 12, 2024, it was announced that Miller had signed with the Saskatchewan Roughriders.
