= Anthony Johnson (cornerback) =

American gridiron football player (born 2000)

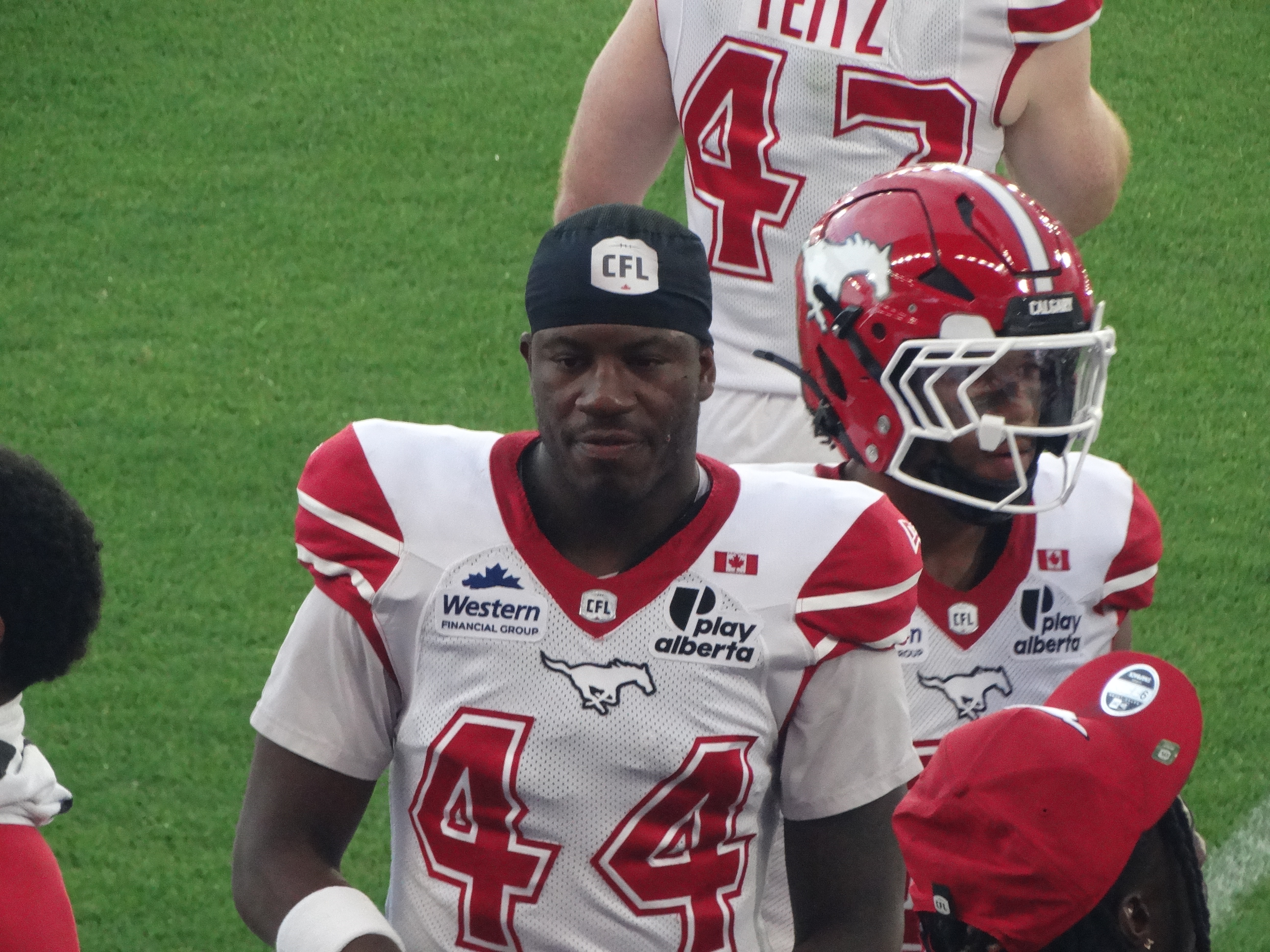
- Johnson with the Calgary Stampeders in 2026

No. 44 – Calgary Stampeders
- Position: Cornerback
- Roster status: Active
- CFL status: American

Personal information
- Born: February 4, 2000 (age 26); St. Petersburg, Florida, U.S.
- Listed height: 6 ft 2 in (1.88 m)
- Listed weight: 218 lb (99 kg)

Career information
- High school: Chaminade-Madonna (Hollywood, Florida)
- College: Louisville (2018–2020); Virginia (2021–2022)
- NFL draft: 2023: undrafted

Career history
- New Orleans Saints (2023)*; Green Bay Packers (2023)*; Atlanta Falcons (2024)*; Calgary Stampeders (2025–present)
- * Offseason or practice squad member only

Awards and highlights
- First-team All-ACC (2022)
- Stats at Pro Football Reference
- Stats at CFL.ca

Anthony Johnson (born February 4, 2000) is an American professional football cornerback for the Calgary Stampeders of the Canadian Football League (CFL). He played college football at Virginia and Louisville.

== Early life ==
Johnson grew up in Coconut Creek, Florida and attended Chaminade-Madonna College Preparatory School. In 2016, Johnson earned all-state and All-Broward County honors while putting up 30 tackles, 10 pass deflections, and three interceptions. Johnson would decide to commit to play college football at Louisville.

== College career ==
Johnson played three years at Louisville and put up 43 tackles, four for a loss, two interceptions, 13 pass deflections, a fumble recovery, and three forced fumbles. Johnson's best season for Louisville came in 2019 where he put up 27 tackles, two going for a loss, an interception, six pass deflections, a fumble recovery, and three forced fumbles. After the conclusion of the 2020 season, Johnson announced that he would be transferring to the University of Virginia for his remaining years. In his first year with Virginia he put up 44 tackles, two going for a loss, three interceptions and five pass deflections. Johnson had a breakout year in 2022, posting 51 tackles, three being for a loss, two interceptions, and 12 pass deflections. For his stellar performance on the year he was named First team All-Atlantic Coast Conference. After the end of the 2022 season Johnson declared for the NFL draft. He would also earn an invite to the 2023 Senior Bowl. In the senior bowl Johnson had an amazing game, intercepting a pass by Malik Cunningham and returning it for a touchdown.

== Professional career ==
Pre-draft measurables
Height	Weight	Arm length	Hand span	Wingspan	40-yard dash	10-yard split	20-yard split	20-yard shuttle	Three-cone drill	Vertical jump	Broad jump	Bench press
6 ft 1 5/8 in (1.87 m)	205 lb (93 kg)	32 5/8 in (0.83 m)	8 5/8 in (0.22 m)	6 ft 5 1/4 in (1.96 m)	4.63 s	1.59 s	2.65 s	4.41 s	7.06 s	30.5 in (0.77 m)	9 ft 8 in (2.95 m)	15 reps
All values from NFL Combine/Pro Day

=== New Orleans Saints ===
After not being selected in the 2023 NFL draft, Johnson signed with the New Orleans Saints as an undrafted free agent. Johnson was waived by the Saints as a part of final roster cuts on August 29, 2023; he was re-signed to the team's practice squad the following day. On October 9, Johnson was released by New Orleans.

=== Green Bay Packers ===
On October 17, 2023, Johnson was signed to the Green Bay Packers' practice squad. He was released by the Packers on November 28, and was re-signed to the practice squad on January 2, 2024. Johnson signed a reserve/future contract with Green Bay on January 22, 2024. He was released by the Packers on May 6.

=== Atlanta Falcons ===
On May 15, 2024, Johnson signed with the Atlanta Falcons. He was released by the Falcons as a part of final roster cuts on August 27.

=== Calgary Stampeders ===
On January 23, 2025, Johnson signed with the Calgary Stampeders of the Canadian Football League (CFL).
