= Matt Williamson =

American football player and coach

Biographical details
- Born: St. Louis, Missouri, U.S.

Playing career
- 1994–1997: Missouri Western
- Position: Linebacker

Coaching career (HC unless noted)
- 1997–1998: Missouri Western (GA)
- 1999: Arkansas–Monticello (DL)
- 2000–2004: Missouri Western (DL/ST)
- 2005–2006: Missouri Western (DC)
- 2007–2009: Central Arkansas (DL/ST)
- 2010–2013: Central Arkansas (DC)
- 2014–2016: Stephen F. Austin (DC)
- 2017–2022: Missouri Western

Head coaching record
- Overall: 31–28
- Bowls: 2–0

Matt Williamson is an American college football coach and former player. He served as the head football coach at Missouri Western State University in Saint Joseph, Missouri from 2017 to 2022. After playing four years for the Missouri Western Griffons, Williams served as the team's graduate assistant for the 1998 season. In 1999, Williamson left for a year at Arkansas–Monticello before returning to Missouri Western where he served in various roles as a defensive coach from 2000 to 2006. In 2007, Williamson left for Central Arkansas to become the defensive coordinator for three seasons, before heading to Stephen F. Austin to become their defensive coordinator. In December 2016, Williamson was named the sixth head coach at Missouri Western. Williamson was relieved of his duties at Missouri Western the day after the last game of the 2022 season. He compiled a record of 31–28 as the head coach for the Griffons.

== Head coaching record ==
Year	Team	Overall	Conference	Standing	Bowl/playoffs
Missouri Western Griffons (Mid-America Intercollegiate Athletics Association) (2017–2022)
2017	Missouri Western	4–7	4–7	T–8th	
2018	Missouri Western	7–5	6–5	6th	W Live United Texarkana
2019	Missouri Western	9–3	8–3	T–3rd	W Live United Texarkana
2020–21	Missouri Western	0–2	0–0	N/A	
2021	Missouri Western	6–5	6–5	T–5th	
2022	Missouri Western	5–6	5–6	7th	
Missouri Western:		31–28	29–26		
Total:		31–28			
