= 2022 Lincoln Blue Tigers football team =

American college football season

2022 Lincoln Blue Tigers football
- Conference: Mid-America Intercollegiate Athletics Association
- Record: 0–11 (0–11 MIAA)
- Head coach: Jermaine Gales (1st season)
- Defensive coordinator: Joseph Carter (1st season)
- Home stadium: Dwight T. Reed Stadium

2022 Mid-America Intercollegiate Athletics Association football standings
	Conf.			Overall
Team	W		L	W		L
No. 5 Pittsburg State $^	11	–	0	12	–	1
No. 8 NW Missouri State ^	9	–	2	10	–	3
Emporia State #	8	–	3	9	–	3
Nebraska–Kearney	8	–	3	8	–	3
Washburn	7	–	4	7	–	4
Central Oklahoma	6	–	5	6	–	5
Missouri Western	5	–	6	5	–	6
Central Missouri	4	–	7	4	–	7
Missouri Southern	4	–	7	4	–	7
Fort Hays State	3	–	8	3	–	8
Northeastern State	1	–	10	1	–	10
Lincoln (MO)	0	–	11	0	–	11
$ – Conference champion; ^ – NCAA Division II playoff participant; # – Live United Texarkana Bowl participant; Rankings from AFCA Poll

The 2022 Lincoln Blue Tigers football team represented Lincoln University of Missouri as a member of the Mid-America Intercollegiate Athletics Association (MIAA) during the 2022 NCAA Division II football season. The Blue Tigers went winless for the second full season in a row and third season in a row overall. The team finished the season with a -397 point differential, scoring 129 and allowing 526.

The preseason and first games were also plagued by injury. Despite these factors, there were a number of bright spots for the Blue Tigers this season. Lincoln's closest game of the season came in a tightly contested 24-35 loss to Emporia State University. The Blue Tigers also trailed by only one point to Northwest Missouri State in the second quarter, however the team would lose 20-58. On the offense, receiver Aderias Ealy averaged the third most all-purpose yards in the conference, at 101.8 YPG. He also averaged the 6th most receiving yards per game in the MIAA (63.4 YPG), and finished 7th in total yards, with 697. Ealy also scored the 6th most touchdowns in the conference (9) and also averaged the 6th most PPG. Quarterback Zamar Brake accumulated the 10th most total yards in the conference with 1,462.

On the defensive side, linebacker Jaylon Mosley recorded the 4th most solo tackles in the MIAA, with 55. He was also 5th in the conference in total tackles (91) and tackles per game (8.3). Defensive back Aeneas Tibbs and cornerback Eric Brown both finished atop the conference with 3 interceptions each. Linebacker Julian Jackson-Linkhart tied for the 5th most forced fumbles (2) in the MIAA. Defensive lineman Cody Bagby had the 8th most sack yards in the conference (35) and was tied for the 11th most sacks overall.

The special teams units were coached by Andrew Malson and 2022 began a three year stretch of PAT kicking percentage over 90% for Lincoln. The field goal unit made 15 of 16 PAT attempts, good enough for the 5th best percentage in the conference. This was also the highest single season PAT percentage in Lincoln history, led by great blocking up front, and core specialists (K) Javier "Kiko" Moereno, (H) Clayton Winkler, and (LS) Blake Oakley. Punter Clayton Winkler also finished 2nd in the conference in total punt yards (2,801).

== Schedule ==
Date	Time	Opponent	Site	Result	Attendance
September 1	6:00 p.m.	at Washburn	Yager Stadium at Moore Bowl; Topeka, KS	L 3–45	5,750
September 10	2:00 p.m.	No. 2 Northwest Missouri State	Dwight T. Reed Stadium; Jefferson City, MO	L 20–58	
September 17	6:00 p.m.	Fort Hays State	Dwight T. Reed Stadium; Jefferson City, MO	L 14–51	2,340
September 24	2:00 p.m.	at Northeastern State	Doc Wadley Stadium; Tahlequah, OK	L 10–38	3,412
October 1	2:00 p.m.	Central Oklahoma	Dwight T. Reed Stadium; Jefferson City, MO	L 3–45	4,218
October 8	2:00 p.m.	at Missouri Southern	Fred G. Hughes Stadium; Joplin, MO	L 14–37	6,012
October 15	2:00 p.m.	No. 7 Pittsburg State	Dwight T. Reed Stadium; Jefferson City, MO	L 10–49	1,008
October 22	2:00 p.m.	Nebraska–Kearney	Dwight T. Reed Stadium; Jefferson City, MO	L 17–66	675
October 29	1:00 p.m.	at Central Missouri	Audrey J. Walton Stadium; Warrensburg, MO	L 14–61	4,887
November 5	2:00 p.m.	No. 23 Emporia State	Dwight T. Reed Stadium; Jefferson City, MO	L 24–35	1,011
November 12	1:00 p.m.	at Missouri Western	Craig Field at Spratt Stadium; Saint Joseph, MO	L 0–41	1,569
Rankings from AFCA Poll released prior to the game; All times are in Central time

== Personnel ==
2022 Lincoln Blue Tigers football team roster
Players
Coaches
Offense

Pos.	#	Name	Class
WR	1	Damon Bell	Fr
QB	2	Xzavier Vaughn	So
RB	3	Omar Allen	Sr
WR	6	Charles Johnson	So
WR	9	Tavian Miller	Jr
QB	10	Zamar Brake	So
QB/WR	13	Nathan Valencia	So
WR	14	Winston Ausmer	So
RB	23	Blayden Brown	Jr
RB	28	LaMarco Yates	Fr
RB	31	Dawan Lomax	Fr
OL	52	Vez Carter	Fr
OL	56	David Guggino	Fr
OL/LS	60	Nick Erviti	Fr
OL	66	Tommy Medellin	Jr
OL	68	Josiah James	Fr
OL	69	Derek Dagrin	Fr
OL	70	Christian Adame	Jr
OL	71	Demetrius Eddie Jr.	Jr
OL	72	Patrick Atkins	Fr
OL	74	Alejandro Flores	Fr
OL	75	Tyler Geide	Jr
OL	78	Kylend Watson-Brown	Fr
OL	79	Tyler Duerbeck	So
WR	80	Aderias Ealy	Jr
WR	82	Michael Buckner	Fr
WR	84	Kevon Jacobs	Fr
TE	85	DaiMon Jones	So
TE	88	Samuel Ingoli	Jr
OL	89	Pat Harris	Fr
WR		Jesse Canamore	Fr
RB		Jaylin Carson	Fr
OL		Chris Caston	So
TE		Tezz Fowler Jr.	Fr
WR		Chris Galloway	Fr
RB		TY Maxwell	Fr
WR		Paul Todd	Sr
WR		Armani Turner	Fr
WR		Roderick Watts	Fr

Defense

Pos.	#	Name	Class
LB	5	Jaylon Mosley	Sr
LB/DE	7	Ishaq Robinson	So
S	11	Elvis Bridgeman	Fr
DB	15	Markey Mallary	Fr
LB	16	Tavion Sullivan	Fr
DB	19	Aeneas Tibbs	So
CB	21	Kelvon Durham	Fr
LB	24	Ian Hackney	Fr
DB	25	Joel Talley Jr.	Fr
DB	26	Devyn Sigars
DB	27	TJ Jasper	Fr
DB	29	Julian Jackson-Linkhart	Sr
DB	33	Dontonio Moore	So
DB	34	Otis Jackso	Jr
CB	35	Eric Brown	Fr
DB	36	LaMarr Spencer	Jr
DB	40	Caleb Rozar	Sr
DB	41	Sumyl Hayes-Dunnell	So
LB	42	TeAndre Skinner	Sr
CB	43	Jamahreon Smith	Fr
LB	44	Cory Macon	Fr
DL	45	Cody Bagby	Sr
LB	47	Cameron Hawkins	So
DL	48	Harris
LB	50	Keith Kelley	Fr
DL	53	Caleb Freeland	Sr
DE	55	Demarea Ball	Fr
DL	59	Corey Edward	Jr
DE	61	Tim Sisson	Sr
LB	87	David Johnson	Fr
LB	90	Donte Moore	Fr
DL	95	Charles Ransom	Sr
DE	99	Kyvin Carroll	So
DB		Ke'Ron Blankumsee	Fr
CB		Cyris Davis	Fr
DE		CJ Douglas	Fr
LB		Wes Hollie (injured)	Jr
DB		Adrian Hopper (injured)	So
S		Rico Lowry	Fr
DB		Keron Mines	Fr
DT		Woodens PierreLouis	Fr
DB		Roderick Watts	Fr

Special teams

Pos.	#	Name	Class
P	18	Clayton Winkler	So
K	38	Javier Moreno Ortega	So
K	39	Landon Hinkle	Fr
LS	94	Blake Oakley	Fr
LS		Rashaun Lane	Fr

Head coach

Jermaine Gales

Coordinators/assistant coaches

- Joseph Carter (defensive coordinator)
- Andrew Malson (special teams coordinator)
- Rafael Aguilar (offensive line coach / recruiting coordinator)
- Ruben Iosefa (defensive line coach)
- Shannon Patrick (graduate assistant)

Legend

- (C) Team captain
- (S) Suspended
- (I) Ineligible
- Injured
- Redshirt

Roster
Last update: 2025
