= Mark Hall (American football coach) =

American football coach (born c. 1980)

Current position
- Title: Head coach
- Team: UNC Pembroke
- Conference: Carolinas
- Record: 21–11

Biographical details
- Born: c. 1980 (age 45–46); Miamisburg, Ohio, U.S.
- Education: Urbana University (2003, 2007)

Playing career
- 2004: Urbana
- Position: Wide receiver

Coaching career (HC unless noted)
- 2005–2006: Urbana (GA)
- 2007: Urbana (OC)
- 2008–2019: Chowan (OC)
- 2020–2022: Chowan
- 2023–present: UNC Pembroke

Head coaching record
- Overall: 35–18

Accomplishments and honors

Championships
- 1 CIAA Northern Division (2022)

Mark Hall (born c. 1980) is an American college football coach. He is the head football coach for the University of North Carolina at Pembroke, a position he has held since 2023. He previously was the head coach for the Chowan Hawks football team from 2020 to 2022. He also coached for Urbana. He played football for Urbana as a wide receiver.

== Head coaching record ==
Year	Team	Overall	Conference	Standing	Bowl/playoffs
Chowan Hawks (Central Intercollegiate Athletic Association) (2020–2022)
2020–21	No team—COVID-19				
2021	Chowan	7–3	4–3	3rd (Northern)	
2022	Chowan	7–4	7–1	T–1st (Northern)	
Chowan:		14–7	11–4		
UNC Pembroke Braves (Mountain East Conference) (2023–2024)
2023	UNC Pembroke	7–3	6–3	T–2nd	
2024	UNC Pembroke	6–5	6–3	T–3rd	
UNC Pembroke Braves (Conference Carolinas) (2025–present)
2025	UNC Pembroke	8–3	5–1	2nd	
UNC Pembroke:		21–11	17–7		
Total:		35–18			
National championship Conference title Conference division title or championship game berth
