= 2023 Senior Bowl =

American college football all-star game

2023 Reese's Senior Bowl
- 74th Senior Bowl
National Team	American Team
27	10
Head coach: Patrick Graham (Las Vegas Raiders)	Head coach: Luke Getsy (Chicago Bears)
	1	2	3	4	Total
National	6	11	3	7	27
American	0	3	0	7	10
- Date: February 4, 2023
- Season: 2022
- Stadium: Hancock Whitney Stadium
- Location: Mobile, Alabama
- MVP: Jake Haener (QB, Fresno State)
- Referee: Billy D. Williams (MAC)

United States TV coverage
- Network: NFL Network
- Announcers: Andrew Siciliano, Daniel Jeremiah, Charles Davis

The 2023 Senior Bowl was a college football all-star game played on February 4, 2023, at Hancock Whitney Stadium in Mobile, Alabama. The game featured prospects for the 2023 draft of the professional National Football League (NFL), predominantly from the NCAA Division I Football Bowl Subdivision (FBS). It was one of the final 2022–23 bowl games concluding the 2022 FBS football season. Sponsored by Reese's Peanut Butter Cups, the game was officially known as the Reese's Senior Bowl, with television coverage provided by NFL Network.

== Coaches ==
Bowl organizers, in cooperation with the National Football League (NFL), named staff members from the Chicago Bears and Las Vegas Raiders to coach the teams. Luke Getsy of the Bears was named head coach of the American team and Patrick Graham of the Raiders was named head coach of the National team.

== Players ==
=== National team ===
Full roster online .

No.	Player	Position	HT/WT	College	Notes
99	Adetomiwa Adebawore	DT	6'2/280	Northwestern	
84	Davis Allen	TE	6'6/250	Clemson	
77	Jake Andrews	C	6'3/325	Troy	
99	Bryce Baringer	P	6'3/210	Michigan State	1 punt, 47 yards
8	Ronnie Bell	WR	6'0/184	Michigan	1 reception, 20 yards
4	Jakorian Bennett	CB	5'11/195	Maryland	1 INT (3-yard return)
95	Keeanu Benton	DT	6'4/315	Wisconsin	
31	Mekhi Blackmon	CB	6'0/175	USC	
13	Karl Brooks	DT	6'4/300	Bowling Green	
30	Sydney Brown	SS	6'0/205	Illinois	
2	Chase Brown	RB	5'11/205	Illinois	9 carries, 40 yards; 1 reception, 4 yards
34	Andre Carter II	LB	6'7/260	Army	
15	Jerrod Clark	DT	6'4/340	Coastal Carolina	
7	Malik Cunningham	QB	6'1/192	Louisville	3/5 passing, 49 yards, 1 INT; 5 carries, 22 yards, 1 TD
52	McClendon Curtis	G	6'6/328	Chattanooga (FCS)	
93	YaYa Diaby	LB	6'4/270	Louisville	
15	Grant DuBose	WR	6'3/200	Charlotte	
71	Jaelyn Duncan	OT	6'6/320	Maryland	
87	Payne Durham	TE	6'5/255	Purdue	1 carry, 2 yards; 2 receptions 24 yards
72	Joey Fisher	OL	6'5/322	Shepherd (DII)	
7	Isaiah Foskey	DE	6'5/265	Notre Dame	
73	Blake Freeland	G	6'8/305	BYU	
9	Jake Haener	QB	6'1/195	Fresno State	12/19 passing, 139 yards, 1 TD; 2 carries, -15 yards
3	Jaren Hall	QB	6'1/205	BYU	
92	Nick Hampton	LB	6'3/235	Appalachian State	
76	Ryan Hayes	OT	6'7/305	Michigan	
1	Daiyan Henley	LB	6'2/232	Washington State	
5	KJ Henry	DE	6'4/255	Clemson	
14	Ronnie Hickman	S	6'1/207	Ohio State	
85	Elijah Higgins	WR	6'3/234	Stanford	
26	Evan Hull	RB	5'11/210	Northwestern	10 carries, 74 yards; 2 receptions 11 yards
--	Thomas Incoom	DE	6'4/265	Central Michigan	
12	D. J. Johnson	LB	6'4/270	Oregon	
0	Roschon Johnson	RB	6'2/223	Texas	did not play (injury)
10	Cam Jones	LB	6'3/228	Indiana	
79	Dawand Jones	OT	6'8/359	Ohio State	
17	Kyu Blu Kelly	CB	6'1/188	Stanford	
89	Tyler Lacy	DE	6'4/285	Oklahoma State	
44	Carlton Martial	LB	5'9/210	Troy	
21	Quan Martin	CB	6'0/195	Illinois	
70	Cody Mauch	OL	6'6/303	North Dakota State (FCS)	
26	Kaevon Merriweather	DB	6'0/212	Iowa	
27	Riley Moss	CB	6'1/194	Iowa	
17	Puka Nacua	WR	6'2/205	BYU	
55	Olusegun Oluwatimi	G	6'3/307	Michigan	
2	DeMarvion Overshown	LB	6'4/223	Texas	
11	Ivan Pace Jr.	LB	6'0/235	Cincinnati	
5	Trey Palmer	WR	6'1/190	Nebraska	
75	Jarrett Patterson	G	6'4/310	Notre Dame	
6	Camerun Peoples	RB	6'2/225	Appalachian State	1 carry, 15 yards; 2 receptions, -3 yards
9	Lonnie Phelps	DE	6'3/245	Kansas	
1	Jayden Reed	WR	6'0/185	Michigan State	1 reception, 25 yards
67	Asim Richards	G	6'4/315	North Carolina	
38	Chad Ryland	K	6'0/183	Maryland	4/5 FG; 1/1 XP
32	Daniel Scott	DB	6'2/215	California	
3	Nesta Jade Silvera	DT	6'2/315	Arizona State	
0	JL Skinner	S	6'4/220	Boise State	
16	Keidron Smith	S	6'2/204	Kentucky	
30	Robert Soderholm	LS	6'1/238	VMI (FCS)	
	SaRodorick Thompson	RB	6'0/220	Texas Tech	5 carries, 35 yards
11	Tre Tucker	WR	5'9/185	Cincinnati	1 carry, 12 yards; 1 reception, 18 yards
--	Andrew Vorhees	C	6'6/325	USC	
6	Keion White	DE	6'5/286	Georgia Tech	
81	Josh Whyle	TE	6'6/245	Cincinnati	1 reception, 13 yards
4	Michael Wilson	WR	6'2/209	Stanford	4 receptions, 76 yards, 1 TD

=== American team ===
Full roster online .

No	Player	Position	HT/WT	College	Notes
79	Steve Avila	G	6'4/330	TCU	
7	Tyson Bagent	QB	6'3/210	Shepherd (DII)	17/22 passing; 138 yards, 1 INT; 3 carries, -11 yards
60	Matthew Bergeron	OT	6'5/322	Syracuse	
23	JuJu Brents	CB	6'4/202	Kansas State	
65	Nick Broeker	C	6'5/315	Ole Miss	
22	Chamarri Conner	CB	6'0/206	Virginia Tech	
94	D. J. Dale	DT	6'3/300	Alabama	
12	Derius Davis	WR	5'10/175	TCU	
2	Tank Dell	WR	5'10/165	Houston	
7	SirVocea Dennis	LB	6'1/230	Pittsburgh	
15	Max Duggan	QB	6'2/210	TCU	4/9 passing, 26 yards; 2 carries, -2 yards
55	Emil Ekiyor Jr.	G	6'3/307	Alabama	
11	Ali Gaye	DT	6'6/262	LSU	
76	Richard Gouraige	G	6'5/308	Florida	
0	Eric Gray	RB	5/10/210	Oklahoma	5 carries, 17 yards; 3 receptions, 13 yards
29	Derick Hall	DE	6'3/256	Auburn	
2	DeMarcco Hellams	DB	6'1/208	Alabama	
5	Hendon Hooker	QB	6'4/222	Tennessee	did not play (injury)
98	Dylan Horton	DE	6'4/275	TCU	
4	Xavier Hutchinson	WR	6'3/210	Iowa State	
9	Andrei Iosivas	WR	6'3/200	Princeton (FCS)	1 carry, -1 yards
41	Anthony Johnson	CB	6'2/205	Virginia	1 INT (37-yard return for TD)
94	Adam Korsak	P	6'2/185	Rutgers	3 punts, 35.7-yard average
51	Isaiah Land	DE	6'4/225	Florida A&M (FCS)	
80	Cameron Latu	TE	6'5/250	Alabama	3 receptions, 30 yards
55	Eku Leota	LB	6'4/257	Auburn	
18	Darrell Luter Jr.	S	6'0/190	South Alabama	
85	Will Mallory	TE	6'5/245	Miami	5 receptions, 46 yards
0	Marte Mapu	LB	6'3/221	Sacramento State (FCS)	
77	Warren McClendon	G	6'4/300	Georgia	
9	Will McDonald IV	DE	6'4/245	Iowa State	
99	Isaiah McGuire	DE	6'4/274	Missouri	
6	Kenny McIntosh	RB	6'1/210	Georgia	2 carries, 9 yards; 1 reception, 6 yards
45	Aubrey Miller Jr.	LB	6'2/225	Jackson State (FCS)	
18	Jonathan Mingo	WR	6'2/225	Ole Miss	3 receptions, 25 yards
64	Wanya Morris	OL	6'6/305	Oklahoma	
88	Luke Musgrave	TE	6'6/250	Oregon State	2 receptions, 13 yards
3	Zacch Pickens	DT	6'4/305	South Carolina	
96	Jack Podlesny	K	6'1/180	Georgia	1/2 FG; 1/1 XP; also played in Hula Bowl
31	Jalen Redmond	DT	6'3/298	Oklahoma	
11	Rashee Rice	WR	6'2/203	SMU	
5	Jammie Robinson	S	5'11/203	Florida State	
92	Tavius Robinson	DE	6'6/265	Ole Miss	
24	Chris Rodriguez Jr.	RB	5'11/224	Kentucky	6 carries, 27 yards; 2 receptions, 36 yards
28	Darius Rush	CB	6'2/200	South Carolina	
59	Nick Saldiveri	G	6'6/316	Old Dominion	
74	John Michael Schmitz	C	6'4/320	Minnesota	
27	Christopher Smith II	S	5'11/195	Georgia	
22	Tyjae Spears	RB	5'10/195	Tulane	1 carry, 2 yards; 3 receptions, 15 yards
54	Tyler Steen	G	6'5/315	Alabama	
8	Tyrique Stevenson	CB	6'0/214	Miami	
--	Henry To'oTo'o	LB	6'2/228	Alabama	
56	O'Cyrus Torrence	G	6'5/347	Florida	
3	Clayton Tune	QB	6'3/220	Houston	9/12 passing, 70 yards; 1 carry, -1 yards
32	Alex Ward	LS	6'4/240	UCF	
1	Jay Ward	S	6'2/188	LSU	
8	Jalen Wayne	WR	6'2/207	South Alabama	8 receptions, 50 yards
1	Dontayvion Wicks	WR	6'1/206	Virginia	
24	Dorian Williams	LB	6'2/225	Tulane	
84	Brayden Willis	TE	6'4/239	Oklahoma	
13	Dee Winters	LB	6'1/230	TCU	
21	Rejzohn Wright	DB	6'2/200	Oregon State	
58	Darnell Wright	OT	6'6/335	Tennessee	
6	Byron Young	DT	6'3/245	Tennessee	
47	Byron Young	DE	6'3/292	Alabama	
93	Cameron Young	NT	6'3/315	Mississippi State	

== Game summary ==
Note: the game was played with a two-minute warning at the end of each quarter, followed by a change in possession.

2023 Senior Bowl

Quarter	1	2	3	4	Total
National	6	11	3	7	27
American	0	3	0	7	10

at Hancock Whitney Stadium • Mobile, Alabama

- Date: Saturday, February 4, 2023
- Game time: 2:30 p.m. EST
- Referee: Billy D. Williams
- TV: NFL Network
- Box score Report

Game information

First quarter

- (9:19) National – Chad Ryland 32-yard field goal; National 3–0
- (0:00) National – Chad Ryland 37-yard field goal; National 6–0

Second quarter

- (7:10) American – Jack Podlesny 35-yard field goal; National 6–3
- (1:54) National – Malik Cunningham 1-yard touchdown run; 2-point conversion (Cunningham pass to Payne Durham); National 14–3
- (0:00) National – Chad Ryland 41-yard field goal; National 17–3

Third quarter

- (2:05) National – Chad Ryland 42-yard field goal; National 20–3

Fourth quarter

- (13:20) American – Anthony Johnson 37-yard interception return for a touchdown, Jack Podlesny kick good; National 20–10
- (4:08) National – Michael Wilson 44-yard touchdown reception from Jake Haener, Chad Ryland kick good; National 27–10
