= Reginald Ruffin =

American football player and coach

Current position
- Title: Athletic director
- Team: Tuskegee
- Conference: SIAC

Playing career
- 1994–1997: North Alabama
- Positions: Defensive end, linebacker

Coaching career (HC unless noted)
- 2002–2003: Tuskegee (assistant)
- 2006–2010: Tuskegee (DC/LB)
- 2011–2021: Miles
- 2022: Tuskegee

Administrative career (AD unless noted)
- 2021–present: Tuskegee

Head coaching record
- Overall: 73–47
- Bowls: 0–1
- Tournaments: 0–2 (NCAA D-II playoffs)

Accomplishments and honors

Championships
- 4 SIAC (2011, 2015, 2018–2019); 7 SIAC West Division (2011, 2013, 2015, 2018–2019, 2021–2022)

Reginald Ruffin is an American college football coach and athletics administrator. He is athletic director at Tuskegee University in Tuskegee, Alabama, a position he has held since December 2021. Ruffin served as the head football coach at Miles College in Fairfield, Alabama from 2011 to 2021.

== Head coaching record ==
Year	Team	Overall	Conference	Standing	Bowl/playoffs
Miles Golden Bears (Southern Intercollegiate Athletic Conference) (2011–2021)
2011	Miles	7–5	5–2	T–1st (West)	L Pioneer
2012	Miles	8–3	6–1	2nd (West)	L NCAA Division II First Round
2013	Miles	6–4	6–1	T–1st (West)	
2014	Miles	6–4	5–2	2nd (West)	
2015	Miles	7–5	5–0	1st (West)	
2016	Miles	5–5	2–2	3rd (West)	
2017	Miles	6–4	4–2	2nd (West)	
2018	Miles	5–6	4–2	1st (West)	
2019	Miles	9–3	5–1	1st (West)	L NCAA Division II First Round
2020–21	No team—COVID-19				
2021	Miles	6–5	4–3	T–1st (West)	
Miles:		65–44	46–16		
Tuskegee Golden Tigers (Southern Intercollegiate Athletic Conference) (2022–present)
2022	Tuskegee	8–3	7–0	1st (West)	
Tuskegee:		8–3	7–0		
Total:		73–47			
National championship Conference title Conference division title or championship game berth
