= Steve Olson =

Steve Olson may refer to:

- Steve Olson (writer), American writer
- Steve Olson (skateboarder) (born 1961), American skateboarder and artist
- Steve Olson (American football), American college athletics administrator and football and baseball coach

== See also ==
- Steven Olson (born 1947), Iowa state representative
