= Grace P. Johnson Stadium =

College football stadium in Pembroke, North Carolina

Coordinates: 34.689316°N 79.20486°W

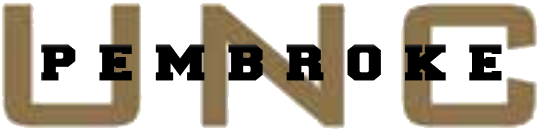
- Interactive map of Grace P. Johnson Stadium
- Full name: Grace P. Johnson Stadium at Lumbee Guaranty Bank Field
- Address: United States
- Owner: UNC Pembroke
- Operator: UNC Pembroke Athletics
- Capacity: 4,000
- Type: Stadium
- Current use: Football

Tenant
- UNC Pembroke Braves football

Website
- uncpbraves.com/grace-p-johnson-stadium

Grace P. Johnson Stadium at Lumbee Guaranty Bank Field is a 4,000-seat college football stadium located in Pembroke, North Carolina. The stadium, located inside the Irwin Belk Athletic Complex, is the home field of the UNC Pembroke Braves. The Braves compete as a National Collegiate Athletic Association (NCAA) Division II Independent.
