= Dave Walker (footballer, born 1908) =

English footballer

Personal information
- Full name: David Walker
- Date of birth: 1908
- Place of birth: Walsall, England
- Height: 5 ft 8 in (1.73 m)
- Positions: Forward; left half

Senior career*
Years	Team	Apps	(Gls)
- Walsall Town
192?–1926	Walsall LMS		
1926–1929	Walsall	20	(7)
1929–1939	Brighton & Hove Albion	310	(28)
- * Club domestic league appearances and goals

David Walker (born 1908, date of death unknown) was an English professional footballer who played as a forward or left half. He made 330 appearances in the Football League for Walsall and Brighton & Hove Albion.

== Life and career ==
Walker was born in Walsall, where he played local football for Walsall Town and Walsall LMS before signing for Football League Third Division North club Walsall in 1926. He played as a forward for Walsall, and scored 7 goals from 20 League matches spread over three seasons. In 1929, he signed for Brighton & Hove Albion of the Third Division South. Walker began his Brighton career in the forward line, and scored 14 goals from 35 appearances in his first three seasons, but was converted to left half and established himself as a first-team regular in that position. He captained the side in the last two seasons before the Football League was abandoned for the duration of the Second World War, and finished his Albion career with 28 goals from 310 league appearances, 30 from 359 in all competitions.
