= David Grant Walker =

British historian

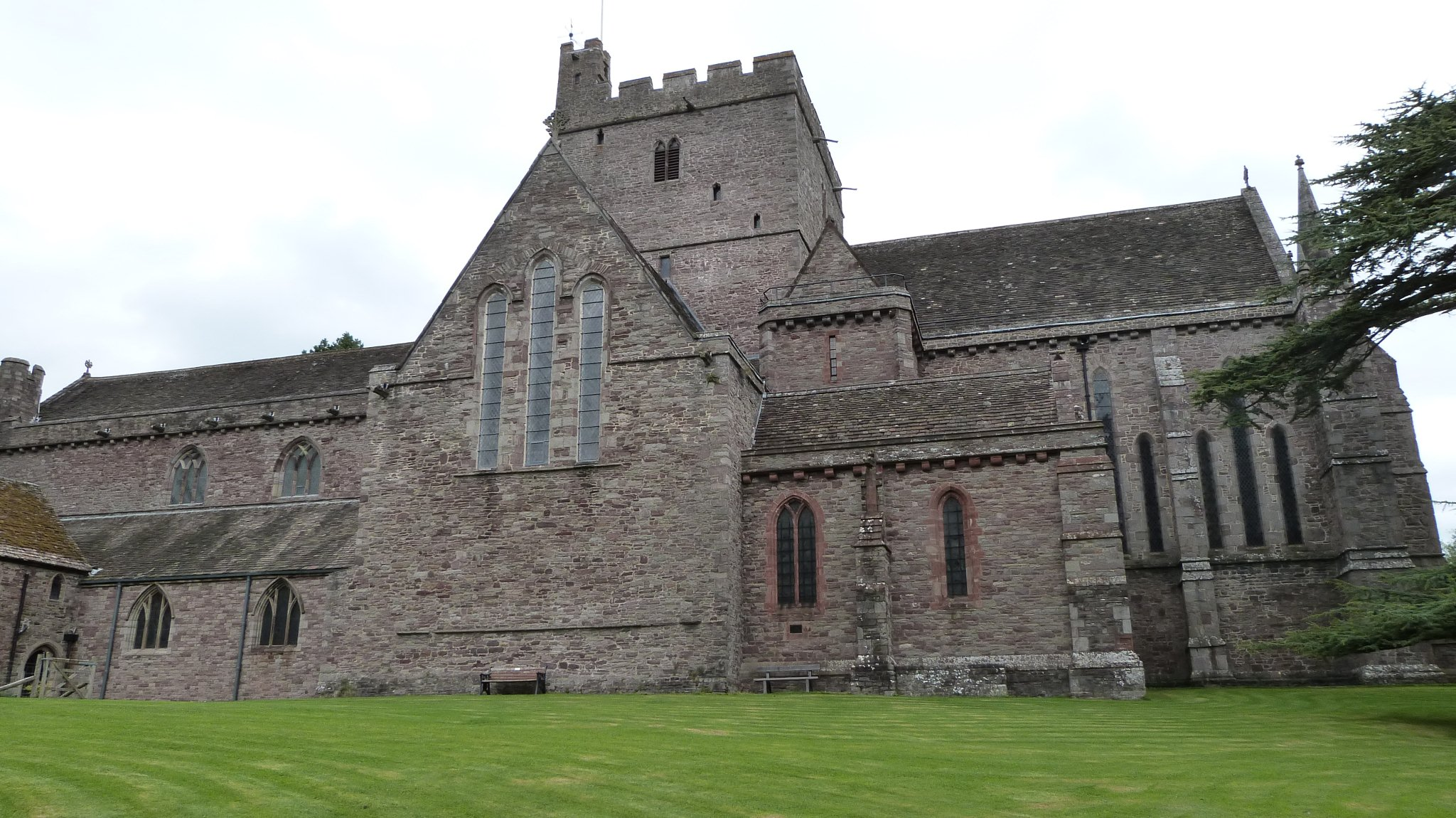
Brecon Cathedral

David Grant Walker (1923 - 20 December 2017) was a British historian of the University of Swansea and the former chancellor of Brecon Cathedral. He was married to Margaret, with whom he had two children.
