= Billy Hickman (American football) =

American football coach (born c. 1983)

Current position
- Title: Head coach
- Team: Western New Mexico
- Conference: LSC
- Record: 10–23

Biographical details
- Born: c. 1983 (age 42–43); Bakersfield, California, U.S.
- Education: Bakersfield College (2004); Tabor College (2006, 2008)

Playing career
- 2002–2003: Bakersfield
- 2004–2007: Tabor
- Positions: Guard, tackle

Coaching career (HC unless noted)
- 2008–2009: Colorado Mines (OL)
- 2010–2017: Tabor (OC)
- 2018–2020: Luther (OC)
- 2021–2022: Western New Mexico (OC)
- 2023–present: Western New Mexico

Head coaching record
- Overall: 10–23

William Hickman (born c. 1983) is an American college football coach. He is the head football coach for Western New Mexico University, a position he has held since 2023. He also coached for Colorado Mines, Tabor, and Luther. He played college football for Bakersfield and Tabor as a guard and tackle.

== Head coaching record ==
Year	Team	Overall	Conference	Standing	Bowl/playoffs
Western New Mexico Mustangs (Lone Star Conference) (2023–present)
2023	Western New Mexico	6–5	5–4	T–3rd	
2024	Western New Mexico	2–9	0–8	10th	
2025	Western New Mexico	2–9	1–8	9th	
Western New Mexico:		10–23	6–20		
Total:		10–23			
