= Paul Johnson (American football coach, born 1984) =

American football coach (born 1984)

Current position
- Title: Head coach
- Team: Chowan
- Conference: Carolinas
- Record: 7–24

Biographical details
- Born: September 17, 1984 (age 42); Parkersburg, West Virginia, U.S.
- Education: Ohio University (2008); West Virginia University (2010)

Playing career
- 2004–2007: Ohio
- Position: Left guard

Coaching career (HC unless noted)
- 2008: Marshall (off. assistant)
- 2009–2010: West Virginia (GA)
- 2011–2016: Charleston (WV) (OL)
- 2017–2020: Charleston (WV) (OC)
- 2021–2022: Bloomsburg (OC/TE/WR)
- 2023–present: Chowan

Head coaching record
- Overall: 7–24

Paul Johnson (born September 17, 1984) is an American college football coach. He is the head football coach for Chowan University, a position he has held since 2023. He previously coached for Marshall, West Virginia, Charleston, and Bloomsburg. He played college football for Ohio as a left guard.

== Head coaching record ==
Year	Team	Overall	Conference	Standing	Bowl/playoffs
Chowan Hawks (Gulf South Conference) (2023–2024)
2023	Chowan	0–10	0–8	9th	
2024	Chowan	3–7	2–5	6th	
Chowan Hawks (Conference Carolinas) (2025–present)
2025	Chowan	4–7	2–4	5th	
Chowan:		7–24	4–17		
Total:		7–24			
