= Doug Geiser =

American football player and coach (born 1968)

Current position
- Title: Head coach
- Team: Ashland
- Conference: G-MAC
- Record: 27–9

Biographical details
- Born: June 4, 1968 (age 58); Wooster, Ohio, U.S.
- Education: Cornell University (1992); John Carroll University (1994); University of Akron (1997)

Playing career
- 1986–1989: Cornell
- Position: Center

Coaching career (HC unless noted)
- 1990: Triway HS (OH) (freshman DC/LB)
- 1991: Liberty-Benton HS (OH) (OC/OL)
- 1992–1994: Lyndhurst Brush HS (OH) (OC/OL/JV)
- 1995–1996: Akron (GA)
- 1997–2003: Akron (TE)
- 2004–2022: Ashland (AHC/OL/RGC)
- 2023–present: Ashland

Head coaching record
- Overall: 27–9
- Bowls: 1–0
- Tournaments: 2–2 (NCAA D-III playoffs)

Accomplishments and honors

Championships
- 2 G-MAC (2024-2025)

Douglas Geiser (born June 4, 1968) is an American college football coach. He is the head football coach for Ashland University, a position he has held since 2023. He was previously an assistant coach for Ashland from 2004 to 2022. He also previously coached for Akron, Lyndhurst Brush High School, Liberty-Benton High School, and Triway High School.

== Head coaching record ==
Year	Team	Overall	Conference	Standing	Bowl/playoffs	D2^{#}	AFCA^{°}
Ashland Eagles (Great Midwest Athletic Conference) (2023–present)
2023	Ashland	9–3	8–1	2nd	W America's Crossroads		
2024	Ashland	8–3	8–1	1st	L NCAA Division II Second Round	20	23
2025	Ashland	10–3	8–1	T–1st	L NCAA Division II Second Round	15	15
Ashland:		27–9	24–3				
Total:		27–9					
