= Josh Dean (American football) =

American football player and coach (born 1982)

Current position
- Title: Associate athletic director
- Team: Lincoln (PA)
- Conference: CIAA

Biographical details
- Born: November 7, 1982 (age 43)

Playing career
- 2000–2004: San Diego State
- 2006: Chicago Bears*
- 2006: Cologne Centurions
- Positions: Linebacker, defensive back

Coaching career (HC unless noted)
- 2009–2011: Fort Valley State (S)
- 2012: Kentucky State (DL)
- 2013–2015: Kentucky State
- 2016–2017: Campbellsville (DL)
- 2018–2022: Lincoln (PA)

Administrative career (AD unless noted)
- 2023–present: Lincoln (PA) (associate AD)

Head coaching record
- Overall: 15–54

Josh Dean (born November 7, 1982) is an American former football coach, player, and current athletics director. He is the associate athletic director for Lincoln University in Oxford, Pennsylvania. He also was most recently the head football coach at Lincoln University, a position he held from 2018 until 2022. Dean served as the head football coach at Kentucky State University from 2013 to 2015. He played college football at San Diego State University before embarking on a professional football career. He was an offseason free agent signee for the Chicago Bears and played for one season for the Cologne Centurions of the NFL Europe in 2006.

== Head coaching record ==
Year	Team	Overall	Conference	Standing	Bowl/playoffs
Kentucky State Thorobreds (Southern Intercollegiate Athletic Conference) (2013–2015)
2013	Kentucky State	5–5	1–4	5th (West)	
2014	Kentucky State	3–7	2–5	4th (West)	
2015	Kentucky State	3–7	2–3	T–3rd (West)	
Kentucky State:		11–19	5–12		
Lincoln Lions (Central Intercollegiate Athletic Association) (2018–2022)
2018	Lincoln	1–9	1–5	5th (Northern)	
2019	Lincoln	0–10	0–7	6th (Northern)	
2020–21	No team—COVID-19				
2021	Lincoln	1–9	1–6	6th (Northern)	
2022	Lincoln	2–7	1–6	6th (Northern)	
Lincoln:		4–35	3–24		
Total:		15–54			
