= Joey Fisher =

American football player (born 1997)

No. 76 – Orlando Storm
- Position: Offensive tackle
- Roster status: Active

Personal information
- Born: November 11, 1997 (age 28); Hagerstown, Maryland, U.S.
- Listed height: 6 ft 4 in (1.93 m)
- Listed weight: 296 lb (134 kg)

Career information
- High school: Clear Spring (Clear Spring, Maryland)
- College: Shepherd (2019–2022)
- NFL draft: 2023: undrafted

Career history
- San Francisco 49ers (2023)*; Pittsburgh Steelers (2023)*; Cleveland Browns (2023)*; Pittsburgh Steelers (2024)*; Atlanta Falcons (2025)*; Orlando Storm (2026–present)
- * Offseason or practice squad member only

Awards and highlights
- 2× First-team All-PSAC East (2021, 2022); Second-team All-PSAC East (2019)
- Stats at Pro Football Reference

Joey Fisher (born November 11, 1997) is an American professional football offensive tackle for the Orlando Storm of the United Football League (UFL). He played college football for the Shepherd Rams and was signed by the San Francisco 49ers after going undrafted in the 2023 NFL draft.

== Early life ==
Fisher grew up in Hagerstown, Maryland and attended Clear Spring High School. He was rated a two-star recruit and initially committed to play college football at Maryland. Fisher later decommitted after the firing of Maryland head coach Randy Edsall and reopened his recruitment. He ultimately signed a letter of intent to play at Shepherd.

== College career ==
Fisher was named a starter going into his freshman season and was named second team All-Pennsylvania State Athletic Conference (PSAC) East. His sophomore season was canceled due to COVID-19. Fisher started all 15 of Shepherd's games as a junior and was named first team All-PSAC East. He repeated as a first team All-PSAC East selection as a senior. Fisher played in the 2023 Senior Bowl after his senior season.

== Professional career ==
Pre-draft measurables
Height	Weight	Arm length	Hand span	Wingspan	40-yard dash	10-yard split	20-yard split	20-yard shuttle	Three-cone drill	Vertical jump	Broad jump	Bench press
6 ft 4 1/8 in (1.93 m)	296 lb (134 kg)	32 in (0.81 m)	10 in (0.25 m)	6 ft 7 1/8 in (2.01 m)	5.03 s	1.72 s	2.80 s	4.83 s	7.57 s	32.0 in (0.81 m)	9 ft 4 in (2.84 m)	40 reps
All values from Pro Day

=== San Francisco 49ers ===
Fisher was signed by the San Francisco 49ers as an undrafted free agent on May 1, 2023. He was waived on August 29 as part of final roster cuts.

=== Pittsburgh Steelers ===
Fisher signed with the Pittsburgh Steelers practice squad on August 31, 2023. He was released from the practice squad on November 14.

=== Cleveland Browns ===
On December 13, 2023, Fisher was signed to the Cleveland Browns practice squad. He was released on January 2, 2024.

=== Pittsburgh Steelers (second stint) ===
On January 17, 2024, Fisher signed a reserve/futures contract with the Pittsburgh Steelers. He was waived on August 27.

=== Atlanta Falcons ===
On January 7, 2025, Fisher signed a reserve/future contract with the Atlanta Falcons. He was released on May 16.

=== Orlando Storm ===
On January 14, 2026, Fisher was selected by the Orlando Storm in the 2026 UFL Draft.
