= Shane Richardson (American football) =

American football player and coach

Playing career
- 1996–2000: Northern Michigan
- Position: Linebacker

Coaching career (HC unless noted)
- 2001: Iron Mountain (MI) HS (S&C)
- 2002: Northern Michigan (LB)
- 2003: Jamestown (LB)
- 2004: North Dakota State (DB)
- 2005: UNC Pembroke (LB)
- 2006–2013: UNC Pembroke (DC/LB)
- 2014–2022: UNC Pembroke
- 2023–2025: Northern Michigan

Head coaching record
- Overall: 39–73
- Tournaments: 1–1 (NCAA D-II playoffs)

Shane Richardson is an American college football coach and former player. He was last the head football coach for Northern Michigan University, a position he had held since 2023.

He previously served as the head football coach at the University of North Carolina at Pembroke from 2014 to 2022. He was hired as head coach of the Braves on February 21, 2014. His contract was not renewed following the 2022 season.

Richardson joined NMU in 2023. After two winless seasons and a 1–6 start to 2025, Richardson was placed on administrative leave on November 3. He resigned four days later.

== Head coaching record ==
Year	Team	Overall	Conference	Standing	Bowl/playoffs
UNC Pembroke Braves (NCAA Division II independent) (2014–2019)
2014	UNC Pembroke	2–8			
2015	UNC Pembroke	6–4			
2016	UNC Pembroke	10–2			L NCAA Division II Second Round
2017	UNC Pembroke	2–8			
2018	UNC Pembroke	2–8			
2019	UNC Pembroke	4–7			
UNC Pembroke Braves (Mountain East Conference) (2020–2022)
2020–21	UNC Pembroke (Note: Due to the COVID-19 pandemic, the NCAA canceled all Division II championships in fall sports for 2020. Unlike Division I, those championships were not moved to spring 2021. Most D-II members had chosen not to play fall sports in calendar 2020.)	2–2	2–2	T–3rd	
2021	UNC Pembroke	6–5	6–4	T–4th	
2022	UNC Pembroke	5–6	5–5	8th	
UNC Pembroke:		39–50	13–11		
Northern Michigan Wildcats (Great Lakes Intercollegiate Athletic Conference) (2023–2025)
2023	Northern Michigan	0–11	0–6	7th	
2024	Northern Michigan	0–11	0–7	8th	
2025	Northern Michigan	1–6 (Note: Richardson resigned from Northern Michigan after seven weeks.)	1–4		
Northern Michigan:		1–29	0–12		
Total:		39–73			
