= Dave Walker (American football) =

American football coach (born c. 1965)

Current position
- Title: Head coach
- Team: Martinsburg HS (WV)
- Record: 0–0

Biographical details
- Born: c. 1965 (age 60–61); Pineville, West Virginia, U.S.
- Education: Glenville State University (1988); Shenandoah University (1997, 2002)

Playing career
- 1984–1987: Glenville State
- Position: Offensive lineman

Coaching career (HC unless noted)
- 1988–1996: East Hardy HS (WV)
- 1997–2019: Martinsburg HS (WV)
- 2020–2022: Concord
- 2023–present: Martinsburg HS (WV)

Head coaching record
- Overall: 14–8 (college); 322–85 (high school)

Accomplishments and honors

Awards
- 2× All-WVIAC (1986–1987)

David Walker (born c. 1965) is an American high school football coach. He is the head football coach for Martinsburg High School; a position he has held since 2023 and from 1997 to 2019. He was the head football coach for East Hardy High School from 1988 to 1996 and Concord University from 2020 to 2022. He played college football for Glenville State as an offensive lineman.

In 2016, Walker was inducted into the Glenville State Pioneers Hall of Fame.

== Head coaching record ==
=== College ===
Year	Team	Overall	Conference	Standing	Bowl/playoffs
Concord Mountain Lions (Mountain East Conference) (2020–2022)
2020–21	Concord	1–0	1–0	2nd (South)	
2021	Concord	4–6	4–6	T–8th	
2022	Concord	9–2	8–2	2nd	
Concord:		14–8	13–8		
Total:		14–8			
