= UNC Pembroke Braves football =

UNC Pembroke Braves
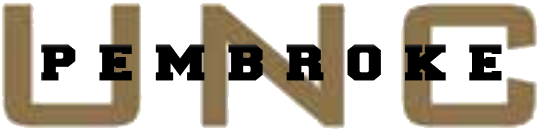
- First season: 1946; 80 years ago (Note: The team was discontinued in 1950. It was relaunched in 2007; 19 years ago.)
- Athletic director: Dick Christy
- Head coach: Mark Hall; 3rd season, 19–9 (.679)
- Location: Pembroke, North Carolina
- Stadium: Grace P. Johnson Stadium (capacity: 4,000)
- Conference: Conference Carolinas
- Colors: Black and gold
- All-time record: 108–83 (.565)
- Website: uncpbraves.com/football

The UNC Pembroke Braves football team represents the University of North Carolina at Pembroke in college football, competing in the Mountain East Conference. Pembroke plays its home games at the 4,000 seat Grace P. Johnson Stadium at Lumbee Guaranty Bank Field, which is located on-campus in Pembroke, North Carolina. Although only fielding a modern team since the 2007 season, Pembroke previously fielded teams between the 1946 and 1950 seasons as Pembroke State.

== History ==
Pembroke State fielded their first team in 1946. Having played only five games in the inaugural season, James Sampson served as head coach. Sampson served as head coach through the termination of the football program following the 1950 season.

Without sanctioned football since the 1950 season, on December 1, 2004, the UNC Pembroke Board of Trustees voted unanimously to proceed with the development of a football program to begin play by the 2007 season. With stadium expansion complete by summer 2005, Pembroke announced the hiring of Pete Shinnick as the reinstated program's head coach on December 13, 2005. With the team in place, the Braves lost their inaugural game on the road to the Davidson Wildcats 31–21 on September 1, and notched their first win in their first home game after they defeated Greensboro College 26–20 on September 8 en route to completing the 2007 campaign with a 4–7 record.

Pembroke improved upon their 2007 record through and finished the 2008 season with a record of 9–1. The 2008 squad featured a defense that lead all of Division II in scoring defense that only allowed 11.20 points per game; was second in total defense with 226.60 yards per game; and was fourth in rushing defense with 71.60 yards per game.

In 2017, Pembroke entered into a scheduling alliance with the South Atlantic Conference. The agreement was originally set to run through the 2020 season, but Pembroke ended the agreement a year early after reaching a larger agreement on associate membership with the Mountain East Conference (MEC). Under the MEC agreement, Pembroke became an associate member in all five of the school's varsity sports that weren't sponsored by its primary conference the Peach Belt Conference, including football.

== Seasons ==
Year	Team	Overall	Conference	Standing	Bowl/playoffs
UNC Pembroke Braves (Independent) (2007–2019)
2007	Pete Shinnick	4–7			
2008	Pete Shinnick	9–1			
2009	Pete Shinnick	9–2			L 13–41 vs. Arkansas Tech (Division II First Round)
2010	Pete Shinnick	5–5			
2011	Pete Shinnick	8–3			
2012	Pete Shinnick	6–4			
2013	Pete Shinnick	9–2			L 13–37 vs. North Alabama (Division II Second Round)
2014	Shane Richardson	2–8			
2015	Shane Richardson	6–4			
2016	Shane Richardson	10–2			L 17–41 vs. North Alabama (Division II Second Round)
2017	Shane Richardson	2–8			
2018	Shane Richardson	2–8			
2019	Shane Richardson	4–7			
UNC Pembroke Braves (Mountain East Conference) (2020–2024)
2020	Shane Richardson	2–2	2–2	3rd (South)	
2021	Shane Richardson	6–5	6–4	4th	
2022	Shane Richardson	5–6	5–5	8th	
2023	Mark Hall	7–3	6–3	3rd	
2024	Mark Hall	6–5	6–3	4th	
UNC Pembroke Braves (Conference Carolinas) (2025–present)
2025	Mark Hall	8–3	5–1	2nd	
Total:		110–85			
National championship Conference title Conference division title or championship game berth
^{†}Indicates Bowl Coalition, Bowl Alliance, BCS, or CFP / New Years' Six bowl.; ^{#}Rankings from final Coaches Poll.

== Rivalries ==
While Pembroke was not a football member of any conference before 2020, they do share a rivalry with geographically close schools, such as the Fayetteville State University and Wingate University.

Fayetteville State and Pembroke are separated by only 47 miles (76 km), with the rivalry named for the Lumber River near Pembroke and the Cape Fear River near Fayetteville, NC. Both schools square off for bragging rights, as many of the players on both teams come from the surrounding Robeson, Cumberland, Richmond, Scotland, Hoke and Moore counties.

One of Pembroke's first games in 2007 was against Wingate, and they have played every year since. With both schools located just off of US-74, and a little over 80 miles (130 km) apart, these two schools have experienced a close rivalry over the past years.

Primary UNCP Football Rivalries: All-Time Records
Name of rivalry	Rival	Games played	First meeting	Last meeting	UNCP Won	UNCP Lost	Ties	Streak	Latest win
Two Rivers Classic	Fayetteville State	12	2009	2025	10	2	0	1 win	2025, 31–24
Battle for 74	Wingate	13	2007	2025	3	10	0	6 losses	2013, 38–10
Totals		25			13	12	0		
