= Tyler Haines =

American football coach (born c. 1985)

Current position
- Title: Head coach
- Team: Catawba
- Conference: SAC
- Record: 15–18

Biographical details
- Born: c. 1985 (age 40–41); Piqua, Ohio, U.S.
- Education: Defiance College (2006)

Playing career
- 2003: Ashland
- 2004–2006: Defiance
- Position: Linebacker

Coaching career (HC unless noted)
- 2007: Piqua HS (OH) (WR/DB)
- 2008–2009: Adrian (LB/ST)
- 2010–2012: Adrian (AHC/OC)
- 2013–2014: IUP (OC/QB)
- 2015–2019: Urbana
- 2020–2021: Baldwin Wallace (DC)
- 2022: Shepherd (OC/QB)
- 2023–present: Catawba

Head coaching record
- Overall: 37–51

Accomplishments and honors

Awards
- 2× First-team All-Heartland (2005–2006)

Tyler Haines (born c. 1985) is an American college football coach. He is the head football coach for Catawba College, a position he has held since 2023. He was the head football coach for Urbana University from 2015 until its closure in 2019. He also coached for Piqua High School, Adrian, IUP, Baldwin Wallace, and Shepherd. He played college football for Ashland and Defiance as a linebacker.

== Head coaching record ==
| Year | Team | Overall | Conference | Standing | Bowl/playoffs |
|---|---|---|---|---|---|
Urbana Blue Knights (Mountain East Conference) (2015–2019)
| 2015 | Urbana | 2–9 | 1–9 | T–10th | |
| 2016 | Urbana | 3–8 | 2–8 | T–10th | |
| 2017 | Urbana | 5–6 | 4–6 | T–6th | |
| 2018 | Urbana | 5–6 | 4–6 | T–7th | |
| 2019 | Urbana | 7–4 | 7–3 | T–2nd | |
| Urbana: | | 22–33 | 18–32 | | |
Catawba Indians (South Atlantic Conference) (2023–present)
| 2023 | Catawba | 5–6 | 2–6 | 6th (Piedmont) | |
| 2024 | Catawba | 3–8 | 1–7 | 6th (Piedmont) | |
| 2025 | Catawba | 7–4 | 5–4 | T–5th | |
| 2026 | Catawba | 0–0 | 0–0 | | |
| Catawba: | | 15–18 | 8–17 | | |
| Total: | | 37–51 | | | |
