= List of Hail Mary passes =

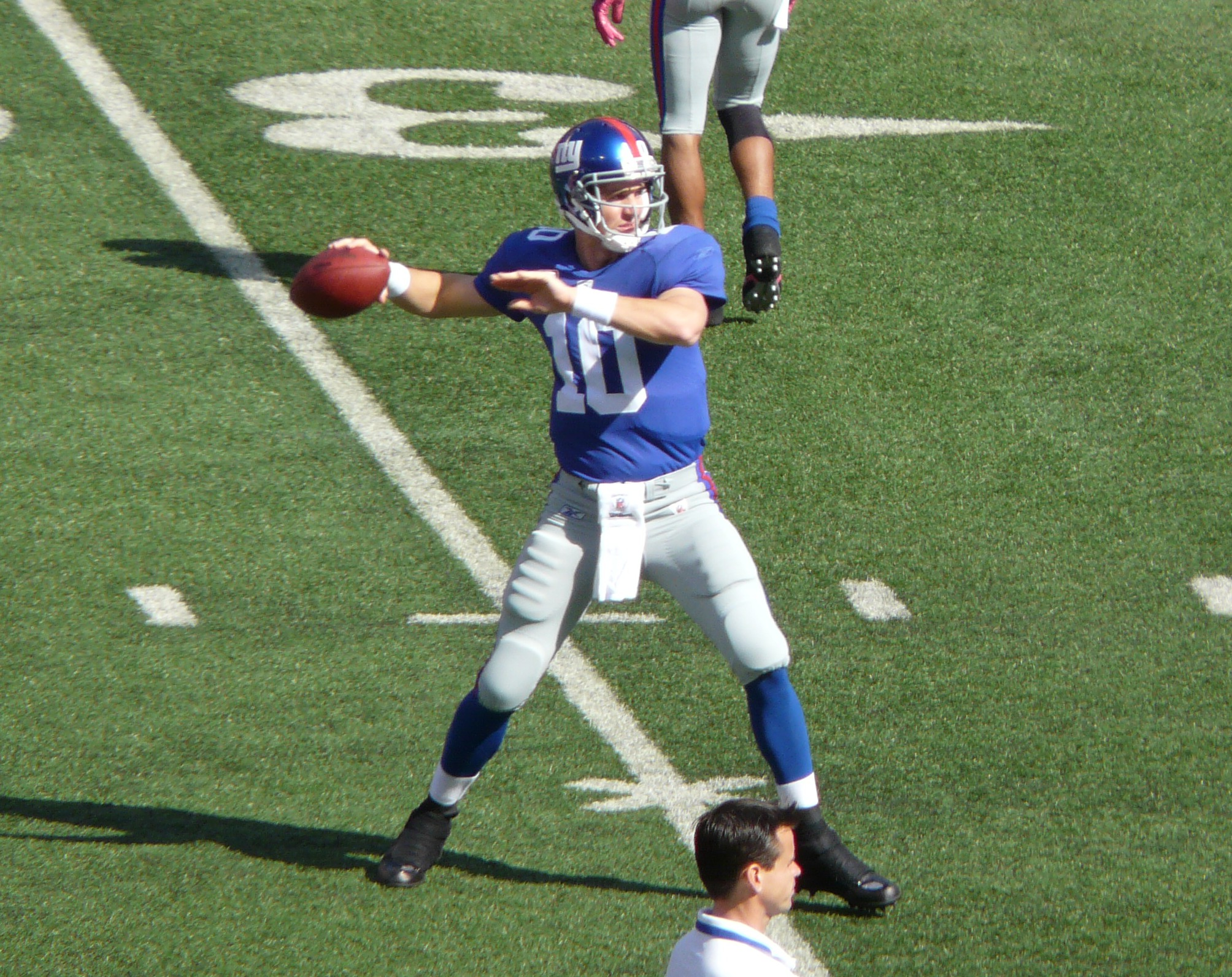
In the National Football League, Eli Manning completed a Hail Mary pass in January 2012.

This is a list of notable Hail Mary passes from collegiate and professional football in the United States.

== College football ==
=== Early use of the term ===
- 1922 — On October 28, 1922, the term "Hail Mary play" was used by Knute Rockne's Notre Dame in a victory over Georgia Tech. Notre Dame trailed 3–0 in the second half and had been unable to move the ball effectively. Noble Kizer, the one Presbyterian player on the Notre Dame team, stopped play and said to his teammates, "Boys, let's have a Hail Mary." They all prayed, and Elmer Layden scored a touchdown. On the next possession, Kizer said, "Let's have another Hail Mary," and Layden scored another touchdown. After the game, Kizer said, "Say, that Hail Mary is the best play we've got." An account written in 1935 presented a variation on the 1922 "Hail Mary" play as follows:

In the huddle the boys were surprised to hear the non-Catholic say: 'C'mon fellows let's have a 'Hail Mary.' The boys said the quick prayer and on the next play Jimmy Crowley dashed 30 yards for a touchdown. Some time later Notre Dame was again stopped and again this non-Catholic called on the boys for a Hail Mary. On the next play Stuhldreher tossed a 25 yard pass to Layden for a score. In between halves this same lad was chuckling to himself. He turned to one of his teammates and said, 'Boy that Hail Mary is a ________ of a play.'

- 1935 — On November 2, 1935, Notre Dame faced an undefeated Ohio State team and trailed 13–0 at the start of the fourth quarter. Notre Dame scored two touchdowns to cut Ohio State's lead to 13–12. With less than a minute left in the game, Notre Dame quarterback Andy Pilney ran 30 yards to the Ohio State 19-yard line. Pilney was injured and had to be carried off the field on a stretcher. William Shakespeare (nicknamed the "Merchant of Menace") replaced Pilney. With the clock running out, the ball was snapped to the fullback who handed it to Shakespeare on what appeared to be a reverse. Shakespeare threw a pass into the end zone, which was caught by Wayne Millner on his knees for an 18–13 win. Red Barber, who broadcast the game on radio, later called it "the greatest college football game I ever called." Radio announcer Tom Manning added, "I always said Shakespeare had a pair of rosary beads and a bottle of holy water in his back pocket." The media picked up stories of the Catholic faithful praying for Notre Dame as they listened to the game on the radio. One nun told a reporter of overhearing a colleague in her convent "gamefully bargaining" and eventually "threatening" the Poor Souls and saints for another Notre Dame touchdown. Shakespeare's game-winning pass became known as the "Hail Mary pass." In 1969, the game was selected in a poll by the Associated Press as the "game of the century", the best game in the first 100 years of college football.
- 1940 — In 1940, Georgetown quarterback Joe McFadden used a play referred to as the "'Hail Mary' pass." An Associated Press article published in December 1940 noted: "A 'Hail Mary' pass, in the talk of the Washington eleven, is one that is thrown with a prayer because the odds against completion are big."

=== Contemporary use of the term ===
- 1980 — Holiday Bowl — BYU vs. SMU: BYU quarterback Jim McMahon completed a 41-yard Hail Mary to Clay Brown on the game's final play for a 46–45 win. The game is known as the "Miracle Bowl" because the Cougars overcame Southern Methodist's 45–25 lead with four minutes left in the game, sealing the victory with a touchdown and kick after time expired. Brown's catch remains one of the most spectacular Hail Mary receptions in football history. He was completely surrounded by Southern Methodist defenders in the end zone, but he outjumped all of them and managed to hold on to the ball during the subsequent pileup.
- 1984 — Boston College vs. Miami (FL): Boston College quarterback Doug Flutie threw a 48-yard Hail Mary to Gerard Phelan for the 47–45 victory. The play is known as "Hail Flutie" and is generally credited with winning Flutie the Heisman Trophy later that season.
- 1989 — Southern Miss vs. Louisville: With Southern Mississippi on its own 21 yard line and only six seconds remaining, Brett Favre heaved a pass that bounced off of the helmet of the Eagles' Michael Jackson and over to wide receiver Darryl Tillman. Tillman scored as time expired, breaking a 10–10 deadlock. At 79 yards, the throw was probably the longest Hail Mary pass ever completed and was later voted on as one of the "Top 5 Memorable Moments" in college football history during an ESPN.com online vote.
- 1994 — Colorado vs. Michigan: Down by 5 points, with 6 seconds to play, #7 Colorado lined up in a formation called 'Jets' – 4-wideouts with trips left. Colorado quarterback Kordell Stewart had good protection, dropped back to his 27-yard line, scrambled a bit, and heaved the ball 73 yards in the air down to the opposing 1-yard line. The play, known as 'Rocket Left', called for Michael Westbrook to tip the ball into the end zone for backup wideout Blake Anderson, but it was in fact Anderson in the middle of a cluster of players who tipped it to Westbrook for a 64-yard touchdown pass on the last play of the game. Colorado won 27–26, and the play (which Colorado had also run at the end of the first half, resulting in #4 Michigan intercepting it) became known as "The Miracle at Michigan" and took home an ESPY for College Football Play of the Year.
- 2000 — Northwestern vs. Minnesota: Northwestern quarterback Zak Kustok completed a 45-yard Hail Mary to wide receiver Sam Simmons. The touchdown gave Northwestern a 41–35 victory as the Wildcats rallied from a 35–14 deficit. The play (a volleyball-style tip to the trailing wide receiver) was named "Victory Right."
- 2001 — Miami (OH) vs. Akron: Future Super Bowl-winning quarterback Ben Roethlisberger completed a 70-yard tipped pass to Eddie Tillitz to defeat Akron 30–27 on the last play. The play was dubbed "Big Ben" (an old Atlanta Falcon name for the Hail Mary pass) and helped Roethlisberger earn the nickname that he would later be known by.
- 2002 — LSU vs. Kentucky: This game ended in a 75-yard Hail Mary pass, thrown by Louisiana State quarterback Marcus Randall, deflected by Kentucky into the hands of Louisiana State receiver Devery Henderson. Before the play, Kentucky players gave a "Gatorade bath" to the head coach thinking they would win. After the play, fireworks were then fired into the air over the stadium and Kentucky fans rushed onto the field and even started tearing down the goal posts in the opposite end zone, not knowing that they had lost. Louisiana State won the game 33–30. The play is known as the "Bluegrass Miracle".
- 2003 — Tennessee vs. Florida: Tennessee quarterback Casey Clausen threw a 48-yard touchdown pass to James Banks on the final play of the first half. The play gave Tennessee a 7–3 lead and they went on to win 24–10.
- 2004 — Texas A&M vs. Oklahoma State: DeQwan Mobley of Texas A&M caught a long Hail Mary pass just before halftime.
- 2005 — Washington vs. Arizona: During the closing seconds of the first half, Washington quarterback Isaiah Stanback heaved a pass 69 yards to Craig Chambers to tie the game at 14. Washington would eventually win 38–14.
- 2005 — 2005 Capital One Bowl — #12 Iowa vs. #11 LSU: Iowa quarterback Drew Tate threw a 56-yard touchdown pass to Warren Holloway on the game's final play to give the Hawkeyes a 30–25 victory. The game was coach Nick Saban's last at Louisiana State, as he was leaving to coach the Miami Dolphins.
- 2006 — NC State vs. Boston College: A 34-yard Hail Mary from North Carolina State quarterback Daniel Evans to wideout John Dunlap with 8 seconds left gave North Carolina State a 17–15 victory.
- 2006 — Arkansas State vs. Memphis: A 53-yard Hail Mary from quarterback Corey Leonard to wide receiver Patrick Higgins with 6 seconds left gave Arkansas State a 26–23 victory.
- 2006 — Washington vs. California: In his third career start, quarterback Carl Bonnell threw a 40-yard Hail Mary that was tipped by three Cal defenders at the goal line and caught by Marlon Wood at the two yard line with no time left. He dove into the end zone to tie the game at 24–24. Cal would win in overtime, and the image of Marshawn Lynch driving the injury cart in celebration became the lasting image from the game, rather than the game-tying pass.
- 2007 — Iowa vs. Indiana: On September 29, trailing 21–0 with five seconds left in the first half, Iowa quarterback Jake Christensen's took the snap and made a 33-yard desperation heave into the end zone that was deflected by a group of three Hoosier defensive backs before being caught by receiver Trey Stross. Iowa went on to lose the game.
- 2007 — Army vs. Tulane: Trailing 17–10, Army quarterback Kevin Dunn threw a 36-yard Hail Mary that was tipped by two Tulane defenders and a diving catch was made by Mike Wright to tie the game at 17–17. Army went on to win the game in overtime, 20–17.
- 2008 — Middle Tennessee vs. Florida Atlantic: Middle Tennessee quarterback Joe Craddock threw a touchdown pass to Malcolm Beyah as time expired to beat Florida Atlantic 14–13.
- 2008 — Buffalo vs. Temple: Buffalo receiver Naaman Roosevelt hauled in a 35-yard Hail Mary pass from quarterback Drew Willy to stun Temple. The play capped a remarkable final three minutes that saw the lead change hands three times. The Bulls won by a final score of 30–28.
- 2008 — UC Davis vs. Northern Colorado: After an illegal procedure penalty, UC Davis was moved out of field goal range to the 38 yard line, down 30–28 with two seconds remaining. Quarterback Greg Denham completed a Hail Mary pass to wide receiver Bakari Grant as time expired to win the game 34–30.
- 2010 — East Carolina vs. Tulsa: East Carolina defeated Tulsa 51–49 with a Hail Mary pass on its final play. The pass was thrown by Dominque Davis and caught by Justin Jones.
- 2010 — UAB vs. Troy: Quarterback Bryan Ellis of UAB threw a 44-yard pass to Jackie Williams as time expired to top Troy at Legion Field, 34–33.
- 2011 — Michigan State vs. Wisconsin: On the final play of the game with the score tied at 31, Michigan State quarterback Kirk Cousins threw a pass into the end zone that was caught by Keith Nichol at the 1-yard line after being deflected off B. J. Cunningham's helmet. Nichol fought two Wisconsin defenders for the extra yard to reach the end zone. It was not ruled a touchdown on the field, however the call was overturned after video replays showed that the ball had crossed the plane, making the play a 44-yard touchdown pass, giving a 37–31 win to Michigan State. It was Nichol's only catch of the game.
- 2011 — Boise State vs. Wyoming: With 1 second to play before halftime, Boise State quarterback Kellen Moore threw a 46-yard pass that Wyoming cornerback Tashaun Gipson batted into the air. Wide receiver Matt Miller, who had already fallen to the ground, caught the ball on his chest as it fell towards him, breaking a 7–7 tie. Boise State used the momentum going into halftime to further expand their lead in the second half and win by a significant margin.
- 2011 — 2012 Capital One Bowl — #9 South Carolina vs. #20 Nebraska: Down 13–9 at the end of the first half, South Carolina quarterback Connor Shaw took the snap from South Carolina's 49-yard line with six seconds remaining. Shaw heaved a Hail Mary pass, which was caught at the 4-yard line by wide receiver Alshon Jeffery, who dove into the end zone for a touchdown as time expired. South Carolina went on to win 30–13, and Jeffrey was named MVP of the game.
- 2012 — Southern Utah vs. California: On the final play of the second quarter, Southern Utah quarterback Brad Sorensen rolled right and threw a 37-yard pass into the end zone that was tipped by several players before wide receiver Cameron Morgan made a one handed catch in the back of the end zone. The touchdown closed the Bears lead to 20–10. The Bears would eventually win 50–31.
- 2012 — Auburn vs. Louisiana–Monroe: A struggling 0–2 Auburn team completed a Hail Mary pass just before halftime when Kiehl Frazier connected with Sammie Coates, giving the Tigers a 21–14 halftime lead. Auburn was then able to hang on to win in overtime over a Louisiana-Monroe team that had upset Arkansas the previous week.
- 2013 — Texas vs. Iowa State: As time expired in the second quarter, quarterback Case McCoy threw a 44-yard pass that was caught by wide receiver Josh Harris. The pass gave the Longhorns a 17–13 lead and was crucial in their 31–30 victory over the Cyclones.
- 2013 — Nebraska vs. Northwestern: Trailing 24–21 with four seconds left in the game, Nebraska quarterback Ron Kellogg III tossed a ball that was caught by receiver Jordan Westerkamp in the end zone. The ball was tipped in the air at the goal line by a Northwestern player before Westerkamp, who was behind the cluster at the goal line, caught the ball 2–3 yards into the end zone. The pass gave the Cornhuskers a 27–24 victory. The play is called "The Westercatch" by Husker fans.
- 2013 — Deep South's Oldest Rivalry — #7 Auburn vs. #25 Georgia: Trailing 38–37 with 36 seconds left in the game, Auburn quarterback Nick Marshall threw a 73-yard touchdown pass to wide receiver Ricardo Louis. The ball was overthrown but was deflected by Georgia defenders Josh Harvey-Clemons and Tray Matthews at the 23-yard line, falling into the hands of Louis, who bobbled and then controlled the catch. The score known as "The Prayer at Jordan-Hare" gave Auburn a 43–38 win.
- 2014 — Jackson State vs. Florida A&M: Jackson State quarterback LaMontiez Ivy threw a 60-yard Hail Mary pass to wide receiver DeSean McKenzie with one second remaining in regulation to defeat Florida A&M 22–16.
- 2014 — Edward Waters vs. Pikeville: Edward Waters quarterback Tyler Mahla completed a 46-yard pass to Devion Laws to tie the score at 48 with no time left in regulation. Kicker Christopher Miglioranzi added the extra point to seal the win. Edward Waters outscored Pikeville 35–7 in the fourth quarter.
- 2014 — Arizona vs. California: Arizona quarterback Anu Solomon launched a 47-yard Hail Mary pass to wide receiver Austin Hill as time expired to defeat visiting California, 49–45. The play capped off a 22-point second half rally in which Arizona scored 36 points in the 4th quarter, including the game's last 19 points in the final 3:30. Fans dubbed the play the "Hill Mary".
- 2014 — Houston vs. BYU: Houston quarterback John O'Korn heaved a 45-yard Hail Mary pass to wide receiver Daniel Spencer in the end zone to pull the Cougars of Houston within a possession at the end of the first half, 23–15, after falling behind 23–0 with 3:23 to play. However, three missed kicks (two points after touchdown and a blocked field goal) doomed Houston in its loss, 33–25.
- 2014 — USC vs. Oregon State: Leading 14–10 right before halftime, Cody Kessler threw a 48-yard Hail Mary pass that was caught by Darreus Rogers on the 1. Rogers then was able to run in the end zone, giving the Trojans a 21–10 lead. USC ended up winning the game 35–10.
- 2014 — Arizona State vs. USC: Trailing 34–32 with seven seconds remaining, Arizona State quarterback Mike Bercovici completed a 46-yard Hail Mary pass to wide receiver Jaelen Strong as time expired to defeat #16 USC, 38–34, in Los Angeles. This was the first time Arizona State had won in the Coliseum since 1999. This completed a 9-point comeback in the last 3:02 during which Arizona State had no timeouts. USC had several defenders on the goal line, but Strong had enough space to leap for and catch the ball just in front of the end zone and then scored the touchdown before the defenders could react. Bercovici, a California native, was starting just his second game that year, having replaced an injured Taylor Kelly. This was not the first time that first-year USC coach Steve Sarkisian had lost on a long pass against Arizona State: in 2009, when he was head coach at the University of Washington) Sarkisian's team was defeated when Danny Sullivan completed a 50-yard pass to Chris McGaha with five seconds remaining in a game that Arizona State won 24–17.
- 2014 — University of Central Florida at East Carolina: After blowing a 26–9 fourth quarter lead, the Knights won 32–30, claiming a share of the American Athletic Conference title when Justin Holman completed a 51-yard Hail Mary to Breshad Perriman as time expired.
- 2014 — Bahamas Bowl – Central Michigan vs. Western Kentucky: Western Kentucky was leading 49–14 heading into the fourth quarter, but Central Michigan rallied by scoring five unanswered touchdowns in the period, including a last-second pass from quarterback Cooper Rush 48 yards downfield to receiver Jesse Kroll, who then lateraled the ball to Deon Butler for 10 yards. Butler then lateraled to Courtney Williams for 2 yards. Williams finally lateraled to Titus Davis, who sprinted down the sideline and managed the reach the ball over the pylon for the touchdown that pulled the Chippewas within a point at 49–48. Central Michigan elected to go for the win on a two-point conversion, but Rush's pass on a fade route was broken up, which allowed the Hilltoppers to escape with a 49–48 victory.
- 2014 — 2014 Capital One Orange Bowl – Mississippi State vs. Georgia Tech: As time expired in the first half, Mississippi State quarterback Dak Prescott threw a 42-yard pass that was tipped and caught in the end zone by receiver Fred Ross. The touchdown cut Georgia Tech's lead to 21–20, but the Bulldogs would eventually lose to the Jackets 49–34.
- 2015 — BYU vs. Nebraska: With his team trailing 28–27 with one second remaining, BYU backup quarterback Tanner Mangum threw a 42-yard pass that was caught by receiver Mitch Matthews, who managed to fall across the goal line as he was tackled by a trio of Cornhusker defenders. The touchdown gave BYU a 33–28 win and ended Nebraska's Football Bowl Subdivision record 29-game winning streak in season openers.
- 2015 — BYU vs. Boise State: Incredibly, for a second consecutive week (following their last second, "Hail Mary" win over Nebraska in their previous game), BYU pulled off a miraculous victory with another long "all or nothing" pass from freshman quarterback Tanner Mangum. This time, with his team trailing 24–21 with 54 seconds left in the game and facing 4th-and-7, Mangum evaded a sack and tossed a 35-yard pass to BYU receiver Mitchell Juergens, who pulled it down in the end zone to put the Cougars ahead. BYU defensive back Kai Nacua then returned an interception 50 yards for another touchdown in the last remaining seconds to close out a 35–24 win.
- 2016 — Central Michigan vs. Oklahoma State: With Central Michigan trailing 27–24 with no time remaining on its own 49-yard line, with an untimed down following an Oklahoma State penalty, Chippewas quarterback Cooper Rush threw a Hail Mary to Jesse Kroll, hitting him just inside the Cowboys' 10-yard line. In a planned play, Kroll than lateraled to Corey Willis, who ran into the end zone for a touchdown to give the Chippewas a 30–27 win. The game was known not only for its finish, but for an officiating error that made the play possible. Shortly after the game, the referee in charge, as well as representatives from the two conferences involved (MAC and Big 12), announced that the Chippewas should not have been allowed to run their winning play. On the previous play, during which the clock ran out, Oklahoma State had been called for intentional grounding on fourth down. Under NCAA rules, an accepted live-ball penalty on fourth down cannot end the game; however, an exception to that rule states that if the penalty includes a loss of down (as is the case with intentional grounding), the game ends at that point. This nuance in the rules was missed by both the officiating crew, provided by the MAC, and the replay crew, provided by the Big 12.
- 2016 — Tennessee vs. Georgia: After a Georgia touchdown with 10 seconds remaining in regulation, it appeared as if the Bulldogs would win this game leading 31–28. It was not to be. Aided by a couple of Georgia penalties, on the last play of the game, Tennessee quarterback Joshua Dobbs threw a 43-yard Hail Mary to receiver Jauan Jennings, who outleaped several Georgia defenders in the end zone to secure the catch. The touchdown gave the Volunteers a 34–31 win, after trailing as many as 17 points. For more details on this game, see Hail Mary between The Hedges.
- 2017 — Tennessee vs. Florida: With 9 seconds remaining in regulation in a tied game, Florida quarterback Feleipe Franks escaped traffic before heaving a 63-yard pass intended for receiver Tyrie Cleveland in the end zone. Cleveland beat two Tennessee defenders to haul in the game-winning catch as time expired, resulting in a 26–20 Florida victory. This play is referred to by most fans as the "Hail Feleipe" or the "Heave to Cleve".
- 2021 — South Dakota vs. South Dakota State: Clinging onto a 20–17 lead with only seconds left in the fourth quarter, South Dakota State attempted to run out the clock on fourth down by having their quarterback run around in the backfield and then throwing the ball away into the stands, but after a video review, the officials determined there was still 1 second left on the clock when the ball left the field of play. Following the turnover on downs, with that 1 second remaining and the ball at their own 43-yard line, South Dakota Coyotes quarterback Carson Camp threw a successful 57-yard walk-off Hail Mary touchdown to win the game 23–20: the ball bounced off the hands of multiple South Dakota State defenders before being caught by South Dakota wide receiver Jeremiah Webb.
- 2022 — Appalachian State vs. Troy: With two seconds left in regulation and the Mountaineers trailing 28–26 from its own 47-yard line, Chase Brice threw up a desperation pass to the end zone. The jump ball was tipped and deflected into the grasp of Appalachian State receiver Christan Horn at the 7-yard line. Horn got a block from his teammate and trotted into the end zone to give the Mountaineers a wild 32–28 victory with no time left on the clock. This game was notable for also being preceded by the first ever visit of the ESPN program College GameDay to Boone.
- 2023 — Houston vs. West Virginia: Despite trailing 35–24 in the fourth quarter, West Virginia scored two consecutive touchdowns, including a 4th and 10 conversion with 12 seconds left on the clock to lead 39–35. On the last play of the game from around the 50-yard line, Houston quarterback Donovan Smith threw the game-winning pass which tipped to wide receiver Stephon Johnson to win the game for the Cougars, 41–39.
- 2023 — Alabama vs. Auburn: In the fourth quarter of the 2023 edition of the Iron Bowl, trailing 24–20, 8th–ranked Alabama suddenly found themselves in Auburn's territory following a muffed Auburn punt return. After driving the ball all the way to Auburn's 7–yard line, Alabama fell back to the 31–yard line on fourth down after a botched center–quarterback exchange and a penalty for QB Jalen Milroe being past the line of scrimmage on a pass attempt. On 4th down with 43 seconds remaining, Auburn sent two linemen to rush Milroe, a linebacker to spy Milroe, and had the remaining eight defenders try to stop an Alabama touchdown. Meanwhile, Alabama sent three wide receivers to Milroe's left and two to his right. After spending six seconds in the pocket, Milroe saw wide receiver Isaiah Bond facing single coverage against Auburn defensive back D. J. James. Bond leaped over James while staying in bounds to catch the game–winning touchdown. The 27–24 win jumped Alabama up to 11–1 on the season, keeping the Tide's hopes of making the College Football Playoff alive. The Tide would end up making the field of four following an upset victory against #1 Georgia in the SEC Championship Game.

== Professional football ==
- 1975 — NFC Divisional Playoffs — Minnesota Vikings vs Dallas Cowboys: With 24 seconds left in the game, Cowboys quarterback Roger Staubach threw the 50-yard winning touchdown pass to wide receiver Drew Pearson to defeat the Minnesota Vikings. Although this touchdown appears to be more of a traditional, scripted "bomb" pass play to a designated receiver, Pearson, Staubach's post-game comments about the play are thought to have popularized "Hail Mary" as a football term.
- 1978 — Atlanta Falcons vs. New Orleans Saints: The Falcons beat the Saints 20–17 on a 57-yard Hail Mary pass from Falcons quarterback Steve Bartkowski to Alfred Jackson. The play was known as "Big Ben"; Bartkowski would repeat the effort five years later in the "Big Ben II" game.
- 1980 — Cleveland Browns vs. Minnesota Vikings: Using a play from their playbook called "Squadron Right", Minnesota quarterback Tommy Kramer completed a Hail Mary pass to Ahmad Rashad as time expired resulting in a 28–23 victory for the Vikings. This pass is also known as the "Miracle at the Met." Kramer passed for 456 yards in the game. As a result of the victory, the Vikings qualified for the playoffs and would lose to the eventual NFC champion Philadelphia Eagles.
- 1981 — Buffalo Bills vs. New England Patriots: Bills quarterback Joe Ferguson threw a 36-yard pass that was tipped in the end zone, and caught for a touchdown by running back Roland Hooks to give Buffalo a 20–17 victory. The win secured Buffalo the last AFC playoff spot in 1981.
- 1983 — Atlanta Falcons vs. San Francisco 49ers: Falcons quarterback Steve Bartkowski threw a Hail Mary pass 47 yards to Billy "White Shoes" Johnson on the final play of the game to give the Falcons a 28–24 win over the 49ers. TV coverage showed that it was very close to being "down at the 1 foot line" but a second referee raised his arms indicating touchdown, as Johnson's left shoulder hit the ground as he was putting the ball over the goal line with his right.
- 1984 — New Orleans Saints vs. Cincinnati Bengals: The Saints' Dave Wilson completed a 54-yard Hail Mary pass, deflected by Bengal safety Robert Jackson, to Hoby Brenner on the last play before halftime to take a 7–3 lead. Ken Anderson, who was recovering from a shoulder injury that he had received earlier in the season, replaced an ineffective Boomer Esiason and rallied the Bengals to a 24–21 victory.
- 1987 — San Francisco 49ers vs. Cincinnati Bengals: Leading 26–20, with 0:06 remaining, Bengals coach Sam Wyche inexplicably called a 4th-down running play instead of a punt. The 49ers stopped the runner with :02 remaining, giving them possession. On the game's final play, 49ers quarterback Joe Montana threw a touchdown pass to Jerry Rice as time expired, and the successful point after touchdown gave San Francisco a 27–26 win.
- 1988 (Playoffs) — NFC Wild Card Playoffs – Minnesota Vikings vs. New Orleans Saints: In the Saints' first-ever playoff game, the Vikings were ahead 24–10 near the end of the first half, when Wade Wilson completed a Hail Mary pass to Hassan Jones, to make the halftime score 31–10. The touchdown put the game out of reach, and the Vikings defeated the Saints 44–10.
- 1991 — Atlanta Falcons vs. San Francisco 49ers: Falcons quarterback Billy Joe Tolliver found Michael Haynes for 44 yards with one second left to beat the 49ers, 17–14, in a key NFC West battle. The Falcons would go on to qualify for the playoffs, with this victory and a stunning road win at Candlestick Park earning them the tiebreaker over the 49ers
- 1991 — Dallas Cowboys vs. Washington Redskins: The Cowboys were playing the undefeated Redskins in 1991. With the game tied 7–7 with time running out in the second quarter, the Cowboys faced a 4th down from Redskins 34 yard line. Cowboys quarterback Troy Aikman threw the Hail Mary in the right corner of the end zone where Alvin Harper cleanly caught the ball for a touchdown, putting the Cowboys up 14–7. The Cowboys won the game 24–21, giving the Redskins their first loss after an 11–0 start.
- 1995 — Denver Broncos vs. Washington Redskins: The teams appeared to be headed for overtime when the Broncos offense lined up on the Redskins 43 yard line with six seconds left. Rod Smith, who had no receptions, scores, or any other recorded statistics at that point, was lined up as the lone receiver on the left side and was in the game because wide receiver Anthony Miller was out with a concussion. Two other Broncos offensive starters – tight end Shannon Sharpe and running back Rod Bernstine – also had left with injuries. Both sides knew John Elway had to go to the end zone because the Broncos were out of timeouts. The Redskins were in a three-deep zone with Darrell Green on Smith's side. The Redskins' rushers were pushed past Elway, and he stepped up in the pocket and fired a line drive to Smith, who leaped in front of Green to catch it, giving the Broncos a 38–31 victory.
- 1995 — Indianapolis Colts vs. Pittsburgh Steelers — 1995 AFC Championship Game: On the final play of the 1995 AFC Championship game, Quarterback Jim Harbaugh attempted a 30 yard hail mary attempt. The ball was bobbled into the hands of Wide receiver Aaron Bailey, who before he could get possession, had the ball deflected by a Steelers defender (Myron Bell), which bounced off of another Colts WR (Brian Stablein) before re-entering Aaron Bailey's hands. Bailey appeared to catch the ball, but the pass was ruled incomplete after the officiating Referee ruled that the Harbough's pass hit the turf before Bailey had possession. With no time left on the clock in the 4th, the Steelers would win, 16-20, and advancing to Super Bowl XXX, where they would lose, 27-17.
- 1995 — New York Jets vs. Buffalo Bills: Boomer Esiason nearly tied the game after connecting with Adrian Murrell on a 41-yard Hail Mary bomb, which was tipped by Cornelius Bennett, on the game's final offensive play. The Jets failed to convert the game tying two point conversion with no time left.
- 1999 — New York Giants vs. New Orleans Saints: Just before halftime, Kent Graham of the Giants completed a 53-yard Hail Mary pass to Joe Jurevicius that had been tipped by teammate Amani Toomer and the Saints' Sammy Knight. The touchdown gave Jurevicius his first NFL touchdown and the Giants a 24–3 halftime lead. New York won the game, 31–3.
- 1999 — Cleveland Browns vs. New Orleans Saints: Browns quarterback Tim Couch completed a 56-yard Hail Mary pass to Kevin Johnson as time expired for the stunning 21–16 victory, the Browns' first victory since returning to the NFL.
- 2001 — Cleveland Browns vs. Chicago Bears: Chicago tied the game on a 34-yard deflected Hail Mary from Shane Matthews to running back James Allen, who made a remarkable diving catch. The play capped off a 14-point comeback in the final 28 seconds of a game that Chicago won in overtime, 27–21, on an interception return by Mike Brown.
- 2002 — Cleveland Browns vs. Jacksonville Jaguars: Cleveland won on a 50-yard Hail Mary pass from Tim Couch to Quincy Morgan against Jacksonville for an improbable 21–20 win. It was Couch's second Hail Mary victory. Many fans refer to this as the "Hail Morgan" catch.
- 2007 — Arizona Cardinals vs. San Francisco 49ers: Cardinals quarterback Kurt Warner threw up a 48-yard toss to Larry Fitzgerald at the end of the first half of the game to take the lead against the shocked 49ers, 21–17. San Francisco, however, would win 37–31 in overtime.
- 2010 — Jacksonville Jaguars vs. Houston Texans: With the score tied 24–24 and 3 seconds left on the clock, the Jaguars had possession of the football on the 50 yard line. Jacksonville quarterback David Garrard attempted a Hail Mary pass to wide receiver Mike Sims-Walker. Houston safety Glover Quin slammed the ball out of the end zone with both hands, only to watch in horror as it bounced right to Mike Thomas at the 1-yard line, who stepped into the end zone with no time left to ensure a 31–24 Jacksonville victory.
- 2011 — Kansas City Chiefs vs. Chicago Bears: With 2 seconds left in the first half, the Bears leading 3–0, Kansas City had the ball on Chicago's 38 yard line. Chiefs quarterback Tyler Palko threw a Hail Mary into the end zone that was batted down by Chicago's Brian Urlacher and Chris Conte only to be caught after the deflection by Kansas City's Dexter McCluster. The pass was Palko's first career touchdown pass and McCluster's first career touchdown reception. The Chiefs went on to win the game 10–3.
- 2012 (Playoffs) — New York Giants vs. Green Bay Packers: With 6 seconds remaining in the first half, the Giants, leading 13–10, had the ball at Green Bay's 37 yard line. Giants quarterback Eli Manning then threw 37 yards to Hakeem Nicks for a touchdown, with Nicks jumping high, catching the ball against his helmet between two defenders. The touchdown put the Giants up 20–10 and they won the game 37–20.
- 2012 — Detroit Lions vs. Tennessee Titans: On the final play in regulation, Lions quarterback Shaun Hill threw a 41-yard Hail Mary pass to the end zone where Titus Young caught the touchdown pass off a partial deflection to tie the game 41–41, capping off a 14-point comeback in the final 18 seconds. However, the Lions would eventually lose in overtime, 44–41.
- 2012 — Green Bay Packers vs. Seattle Seahawks — 2012 Packers–Seahawks officiating controversy: Playing with replacement officials on a Monday night, Seattle quarterback Russell Wilson threw a last-second Hail Mary attempt on 4th-and-10 to Golden Tate, who was surrounded by three Green Bay defenders in the end zone. Tate pushed one of the defenders out of the way as the ball approached without drawing a flag from the officials for offensive pass interference. As the ball arrived, M.D. Jennings of the Packers appeared to have intercepted the pass at the height of his jump, but as Jennings and Tate fell to the ground, they struggled for possession of the ball. Once on the ground, they both had two hands on the ball, and one referee signaled touchdown, while the other signaled for the clock to stop. A booth replay review followed and the touchdown ruling stood, resulting in a 14–12 Seattle victory. This play, known as the "Fail Mary", led to confusion and debate over what exactly constituted a "catch" according to NFL rules, especially in an instance such as this where two opposing players are vying for possession. NFL Commentator Gregg Rosenthal claimed that this event brought about the "replacement official apocalypse", as the NFL and the regular referees quickly reached a deal that brought them back to work by the following week.
- 2013 — Baltimore Ravens vs. Cincinnati Bengals: After falling behind 17–0 at halftime, the Bengals rallied back to come to 17–10 with 2 seconds left on the game clock. With Ravens players already in the locker room conducting after-game interviews, Andy Dalton, facing a 4th-and-15 from the Bengals 49-yard line, skied a ball into the air that was deflected twice by Bengals and Ravens players until it was finally caught by Bengals receiver A. J. Green. The second tip was performed by Ravens safety James Ihedigbo who could have easily knocked the ball to the ground, except he accidentally tipped the ball up behind him where Green was waiting. This would tie the game and send it into overtime, but the Bengals would eventually lose 20–17.
- 2015 — Indianapolis Colts vs. Houston Texans: Houston quarterback Brian Hoyer completed a 42-yard Hail Mary pass to wide receiver Jaelen Strong to end the first half trailing 13–10. However, the Texans would lose to the Colts 27–20.
- 2015 — Green Bay Packers vs. Detroit Lions: On what later turned out to be only the second to last play of the game, with no time left in regulation, a penalty was called against the Lions awarding the Packers 15 yards and an additional play. During the play, Aaron Rodgers evaded three Lions pass rushers for 8 seconds before throwing a 66-yard pass to the four Packers receivers and tight end Richard Rodgers waiting in the end zone. Richard Rodgers caught the pass, resulting in a 27–23 Packers victory. This was dubbed "The Miracle in Motown" and was Rodgers's first successful Hail Mary pass. It also became the longest game-winning Hail Mary play in NFL history. Aaron Rodgers and Richard Rodgers received the Best Play ESPY Award for this on July 13, 2016.
- 2015 — Kansas City Chiefs vs. Baltimore Ravens: Ravens quarterback Jimmy Clausen connected with receiver Kamar Aiken on a 48-yard pass to end the first half. However, the Ravens would eventually lose to the Chiefs, 34–14.
- 2016 (Playoffs) — NFC Divisional Playoff — Green Bay Packers vs. Arizona Cardinals: Green Bay quarterback Aaron Rodgers heaved a 41-yard pass to receiver Jeff Janis, who out-leaped Arizona defenders Patrick Peterson and Rashad Johnson to fully retain control of the ball in the end zone, as time expired in regulation. It was Rodgers's second successful Hail Mary throw in his professional career, about a month after "The Miracle in Motown" (see above). This score tied the game at 20 and forced overtime. However, the Packers would eventually lose to the Cardinals in overtime, 26–20, in what became known as the Hail Larry game.
- 2016 — Cincinnati Bengals vs. Cleveland Browns: With 7 seconds left to play in the first half and the Bengals up 14–10 on the Browns' 48-yard line, Bengals quarterback Andy Dalton launched the ball into the end zone as time expired. In the end zone, wide receiver A. J. Green reached his hand into the air and tipped the ball. As the ball floated down towards the ground, Green was able to use the same hand to juggle the ball and pull it into his chest to complete the catch. The Bengals went into halftime up 21–10 and eventually won 31–17.
- 2016 — Chicago Bears vs. Tampa Bay Buccaneers: With 5 seconds left to play in the first half and the ball at midfield, Bears quarterback Jay Cutler completed a 50-yard Hail Mary pass to receiver Cameron Meredith in the back of the end zone off a deflection. However, the Bears would lose to the Buccaneers 36–10.
- 2017 (Playoffs) — New York Giants vs. Green Bay Packers: With 6 seconds left to play in the first half and the Packers leading 7–6, Packers quarterback Aaron Rodgers launched the ball into the end zone as time expired. Wide receiver Randall Cobb caught the ball in the back of the end zone for a 42-yard touchdown to give the Packers a 14–6 halftime lead. The Packers would go on to win 38–13.
- 2018 — Minnesota Vikings vs Detroit Lions: With 2 seconds left to play in the first half, Vikings quarterback Kirk Cousins completed a 44-yard pass to tight end Kyle Rudolph, who managed to make the catch despite being held by DeShawn Shead. The Vikings went into halftime up 14–9 and eventually won 27–9.
- 2020 — Buffalo Bills vs. Arizona Cardinals: After the Bills scored a touchdown with 0:34 left in the fourth quarter to take a 30–26 lead, Arizona Cardinals quarterback Kyler Murray completed a 43-yard touchdown pass to DeAndre Hopkins over a crowd of three Bills defenders with 0:02 remaining. The play, later dubbed the "Hail Murray", gave the Cardinals a 32–30 win as the Bills failed to score on a hook and ladder play on the kickoff.
- 2020 — Seattle Seahawks vs. Philadelphia Eagles: With 21 seconds remaining in the game, the Eagles had the ball at Seahawks' 33 yard line. Eagles quarterback Carson Wentz completed a pass to tight end Richard Rodgers, who recorded the second Hail Mary touchdown of his career. The Eagles converted a 2-point attempt, however, they still would lose to the Seahawks 23–17.
- 2021 — Arizona Cardinals vs. Cleveland Browns: With 3 seconds remaining in the first half, the Browns had the ball at their own 43 yard line. Browns quarterback Baker Mayfield completed a 57-yard pass to wide receiver Donovan People-Jones to cut the Cardinals' lead from 23–7 to 23–14. However, the Cardinals would end up winning 37–14.
- 2023 — Washington Commanders vs. Denver Broncos: Despite facing a 21–3 first half deficit, the Commanders had rallied back to hold a 35–27 lead with 3 seconds remaining in regulation. With Denver in possession at midfield, Broncos quarterback Russell Wilson heaved a pass to the goal line as time expired with it being deflected twice before Brandon Johnson secured the ball in the endzone to cut the Washington lead to 35–33. However, the Commanders would ultimately emerge victorious after Denver failed to convert on the ensuing two-point conversion in controversial fashion due to an uncalled pass interference penalty.
- 2024 — New York Jets vs. Buffalo Bills: On October 14, 2024, during the Monday Night Football game, with eight seconds left until the halftime and with the Jets trailing the Bills 20–10, Aaron Rodgers completed a 52-yard Hail Mary pass to Allen Lazard.
- 2024 — Chicago Bears vs. Washington Commanders: On October 27, 2024, Commanders rookie quarterback Jayden Daniels completed a 52-yard pass to Noah Brown with two seconds remaining to win the game 18–15 in a play known as the Hail Maryland.

== List of passes often mistakenly referred to as a "Hail Mary" ==
A number of games over the years have been decided by long, last-second touchdown throws but were not, strictly-speaking, Hail Mary passes. Below is a list of such games with explanations as to why it has been improper to describe them as Hail Marys. Usually, the touchdowns were more conventional pass plays with designated receivers and not of the unscripted, "jump ball" throws that are normally associated with Hail Mary-styled passes.

- 1972 — AFC Divisional Playoffs — Pittsburgh Steelers vs. Oakland Raiders: Pittsburgh trailed in this game 7–6 and faced fourth down and 10 from their own 40 with 22 seconds remaining. Pittsburgh's Terry Bradshaw threw to halfback Frenchy Fuqua but the Raiders' Jack Tatum collided with him and the ball was deflected towards the Steelers' Franco Harris, who then scored a controversial touchdown. This play has become known as the Immaculate Reception. The pass is usually not considered a "Hail Mary" pass in that it was a scripted play intended for a specific receiver and not thrown desperately "up for grabs" like Hail Marys usually are. It also was not thrown anywhere near the Raiders' end zone by design.
- 1974 — Thanksgiving Day game — Washington Redskins vs Dallas Cowboys: Dallas reserve quarterback and rookie Clint Longley, filling in for an injured Roger Staubach, threw two touchdown passes including the game winning 50-yarder to Drew Pearson to push the Cowboys to a 24–23 victory and, in the process, keeping the Cowboys in the playoff hunt. This pass was more of a traditional, late-game "bomb" throw with a scripted post route for Pearson. There were 35 seconds remaining when the play was attempted.
- 1997 — Nebraska vs. Missouri: Nebraska quarterback Scott Frost's last-second pass to Shevin Wiggins was deflected, then before the ball touched the ground, Wiggins kicked the ball towards the back of the end zone where teammate Matt Davidson scooped the ball up just before it hit the ground. The touchdown sent the game into overtime, when the top ranked Cornhuskers won. Nebraska went on to share the national title that season. This play is also known as the Flea Kicker. It is generally not considered a Hail Mary pass as it was very short — attempted within the red zone — and was more of a traditional, scripted pass play that just ended up having an unusual result.
- 2003 — Arizona Cardinals vs. Minnesota Vikings: The Cardinals stunned the Vikings on a 28-yard touchdown pass as time expired from Josh McCown to Nate Poole to win 18–17. The pass, which was made in just McCown's third start, appears to have been intended for strictly for Poole, one of two reasons it is not historically viewed as a Hail Mary (the other is that it was a relatively short play, as Hail Mary plays have usually traveled at least 50 yards to completion). The loss was costly for the Vikings as they not only lost the game, but lost the NFC North title to the Packers and were eliminated from playoff contention. The reception is noted for the fact that under NFL rules at the time, Poole was given the touchdown reception even though he did not get both feet inbounds because he was shoved out of bounds by a Viking defender after making the catch and getting 1 foot in; the league has since changed this rule, and under current standards the pass would have been incomplete.
- 2005 — Capital One Bowl — Iowa vs. Louisiana State University: With 14 seconds left, Iowa quarterback Drew Tate completed a 56-yard touchdown pass to Warren Holloway, left open due to a Louisiana State defensive breakdown, to give Iowa a 30–25 victory on the game's final play. This play is usually not considered a Hail Mary pass per se and varies from the traditional definition of one in that the throw was intended for a specific receiver and not tossed "up for grabs."
- 2009 — Minnesota Vikings vs. San Francisco 49ers: The 49ers were up 24–20 with 11 seconds left in the game. The Vikings had the ball at the 49ers' 32 yard line. Brett Favre rolled out right and avoided a defender by using a pump fake. Then, he threw it from about the 39 yard line and connected to Greg Lewis in the very back of the end zone. Lewis just got both of his feet in, making a spectacular catch. This play isn't considered a Hail Mary because there were two seconds left on the clock, and another play (which would have been a Hail Mary attempt) would have been run by Minnesota if Lewis's reception had been called off.
- 2012 — AFC Divisional Playoffs — Baltimore Ravens vs Denver Broncos: With 45 seconds remaining and at their own 30 down by 7, the Ravens needed a miracle against the Broncos. Ravens quarterback Joe Flacco launched the ball to Jacoby Jones on the right sideline, who caught it at the Broncos' 20 yard line and scampered in for the touchdown. This would send the game to overtime and the Ravens would kick a field goal in the second overtime to win the game. This play, known as the Mile High Miracle, was not a Hail Mary was because the play called in the situation might have been too deep; also, the play did not consist of several players jumping up for the ball, or "up for grabs".
- 2013 — Fordham vs. Temple: With Temple leading 29–23, Fordham quarterback Michael Nebrich, with 13 seconds left, rolled to his right after taking the snap and then threw a 29-yard touchdown pass to wide receiver Sam Ajala with 4 seconds left, giving Fordham a 30–29 victory with the extra point, their first ever victory over a Football Bowl Series opponent. The play cannot be considered a Hail Mary because it took place on third down, meaning that Fordham would have had one more chance at a touchdown had the pass been incomplete.
- 2013 — Florida State vs. Boston College: With the game tied 17–17, Florida State quarterback Jameis Winston took the snap with 1 second left at the Seminole 45 in the first half, dodged several tacklers, and threw a bomb to Kenny Shaw that was caught at the 2 yard line before Shaw dove for the end zone. The Seminoles would eventually win by a final score of 48–34, en route to winning the BCS Championship Game. This is not considered a Hail Mary play because although the pass was completed as the half ended, it did not consist of several players jumping up for the ball (there was only one safety on Shaw when he made the catch).
- 2017 — NFC Divisional Playoffs — New Orleans Saints vs. Minnesota Vikings: The "Minneapolis Miracle": After a furious last four minutes with three lead changes, Minnesota was down by 1 with the ball on their own 39 and just 10 seconds left. On the next play, Case Keenum completed a 30-yard throw to Stefon Diggs, who was near the sideline within field goal range. The Saints defender, Marcus Williams, aggressively moved to block Diggs from getting out of bounds, as the Vikings had no time-outs. Diggs easily avoided Williams, who inadvertently ended up taking out his teammate Ken Crawley instead, and sprinted down the sideline for a walk-off touchdown. Although it occurred with no time left on the clock, this play is not a Hail Mary because it was not a desperation heave into the end zone. The play was immediately named the "Minneapolis Miracle" on air by Vikings radio announcer Paul Allen.

== See also ==
- Walk-off touchdown
- Buzzer beater (basketball etc.)
- List of longest NBA field goals
- Kicks after the siren in Australian rules football
- Last-minute goal (soccer)
- List of nicknamed NFL games and plays
