= Walk-off touchdown =

American football term

A walk-off touchdown is a touchdown scored in gridiron football that ends the game with the winning team being either behind or tied in points at the beginning of the play.

This play does not often occur during regulation time. A walk-off touchdown is much more common during overtime play because of the overtime rules in effect.

Former quarterback Tim Couch has the most walk-off touchdowns from throwing Hail Marys in the NFL with two.

== Notable examples ==
- Chester Marcol Game, NFL, 1980, blocked field goal returned by kicker in overtime
- The Play, college football, 1982, 5 lateral passes
- Hail Flutie, college football, 1984, Hail Mary pass
- Miracle at Michigan, college football, 1994, Hail Mary pass
- Bluegrass Miracle, college football, 2002, Hail Mary pass
- Mississippi Miracle, college football, 2007, 15 lateral passes
- Miracle at the New Meadowlands, NFL, 2010, returned a punt for a touchdown
- Kick Six, college football, 2013, returned a missed field goal for a touchdown
- Miracle in Motown, NFL, 2015, Hail Mary pass
- Minneapolis Miracle, NFL, 2017, Shotgun pass
- Miracle in Miami, NFL, 2018, 2 lateral passes
- Lunatic Lateral, NFL, 2022, returned an intercepted lateral pass for a touchdown
- Hail Maryland, NFL, 2024, Hail Mary pass

== Walk-off variations ==
A walk-off field goal is a very similar play as a walk-off touchdown, just with a field goal winning and ending the game.

A walk-off extra point or two-point conversion are when an extra point is kicked or a two-point conversion is scored with :00 on clock & during the last play of the game. Again, the winning team must have been tied or losing at the beginning of the extra points play. During an extra point attempt or two points attempt, the defense could take the ball the other way for a two point walk-off touchdown.

A walk-off safety is a play that has happened 3 times in the NFL, all in overtime. A safety scores two points.

A walk-off conversion safety could happen during an extra point or a two point conversion attempt. During this type of play, either team could score a 1 point conversion safety.

== See also ==
- Walk-off home run
- Buzzer beater (basketball)
- Last-minute goal (soccer)
- List of Hail Mary passes
- List of longest NBA field goals
- Kicks after the siren in Australian rules football
