= Lions–Packers rivalry =

National Football League rivalry

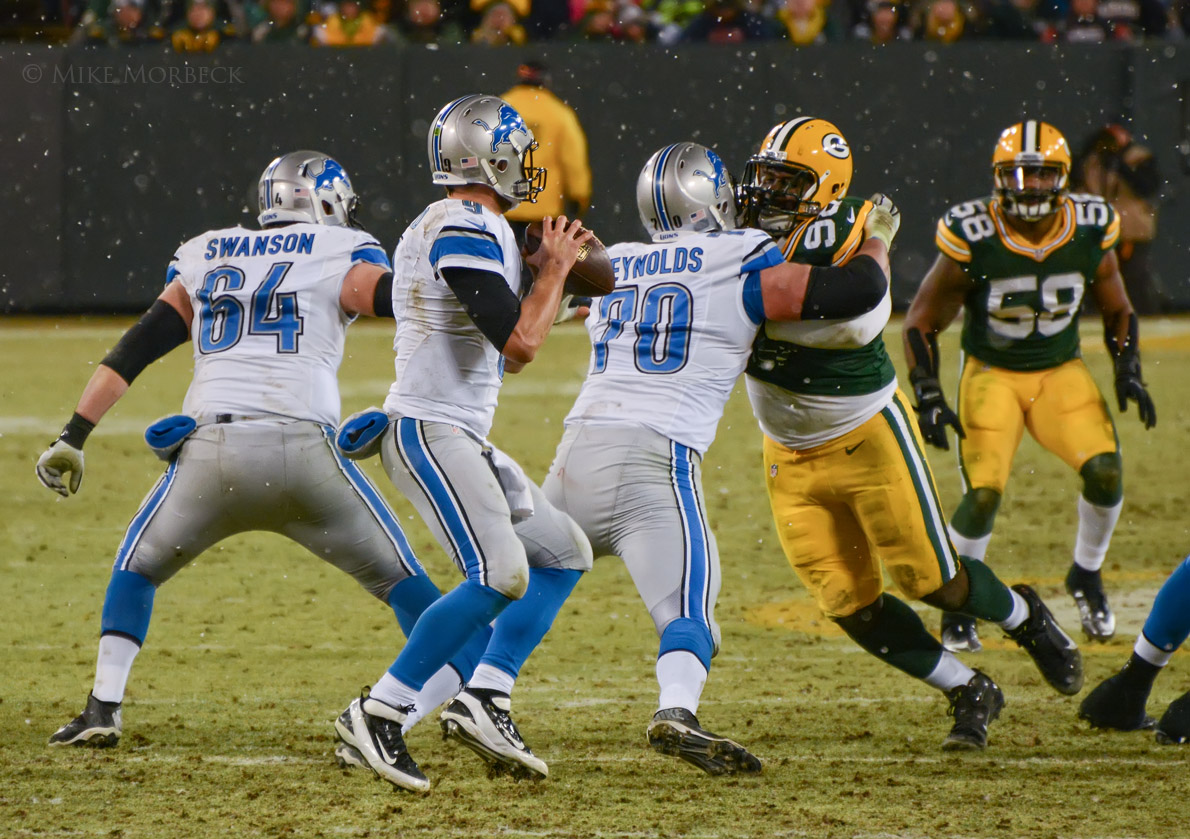
- Matthew Stafford (holding the football) about to throw a pass against the Packers in a 2014 match-up at Lambeau Field

- Detroit Lions Green Bay Packers
- Location: Detroit, Green Bay
- First meeting: November 2, 1930; Packers 47, Spartans 13
- Latest meeting: October 25, 2026; Lions 20, Packers 17
- Next meeting: January 9/10, 2027
- Stadiums: Lions: Ford Field; Packers: Lambeau Field

Statistics
- Total meetings: 194
- All-time series: Packers: 108–79–7
- Regular season series: Packers: 106–79–7
- Postseason results: Packers: 2–0
- Largest victory: Lions: 40–0 (1970); Packers: 50–7 (1940)
- Most points scored: Lions: 52 (1951), (1952); Packers: 57 (1945)
- Longest win streak: Lions: 11 (1949–1954); Packers: 10 (1940–1945, 2005–2010)
- Current win streak: Lions: 1 (2026–present)

Post-season history
- 1993 NFC Wild Card: Packers won: 28–24; 1994 NFC Wild Card: Packers won: 16–12
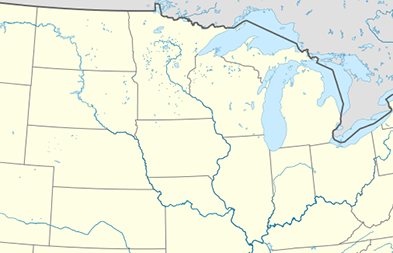

The Lions–Packers rivalry or Yooper Bowl is a National Football League (NFL) rivalry between the Detroit Lions and Green Bay Packers.

They first met in 1929 when the Lions, originally based in Portsmouth, Ohio and known as the Portsmouth Spartans, were an independent team prior to joining the NFL the following season. In 1934, the Spartans relocated to Detroit and became the Detroit Lions. The Lions and Packers have been division rivals since 1933, when both teams were part of the NFL's Western Conference until 1970, and subsequently the NFC Central, now referred to as the NFC North. Since 1932, they have faced each other twice each season, with no games ever cancelled. As a result, this rivalry stands as the longest uninterrupted competition in the NFL.

The rivalry is significant to football fans in the state of Michigan, and particularly the Upper Peninsula. Fans from the west of the peninsula tend to support the Packers, whereas fans from the east of the peninsula, as well as the rest of Michigan's Lower Peninsula, tend to support the Lions. Because of this, within Michigan, the rivalry is often known as the Yooper Bowl.

The Packers lead the overall series, 108–79–7. The two teams have met twice in the playoffs, with the Packers winning both games.

== Notable moments and games ==
- Packers 50, Lions 7 (November 24, 1940) – In the most lopsided game in the rivalry's history, the Packers raced out to a 43–0 lead and prevailed 50–7. The win moved the Packers to 6-4 and dropped the Lions to 5–5–1.
- Packers 57, Lions 21 (October 7, 1945) – The Packers set (and still hold) an NFL record by scoring 41 points in a single quarter. The Lions led 7–0 in the 2nd quarter before the Packers scored six consecutive touchdowns, including four receiving touchdowns by Don Hutson. The four touchdown receptions in a single quarter is an NFL record that still stands today. Don Hutson also made five of his six extra point attempts in the quarter to give him 29 points for the quarter in total, which is also an NFL record.
- Lions 26, Packers 14 (November 22, 1962) – The Packers entered the game 10–0 and in first place in the Western Conference. The Lions were second at 8–2. The Lions jumped out to a 23–0 halftime lead and extended the lead to 26–0 before the Packers scored two late touchdowns. The Lions defense pounded Packers quarterback Bart Starr with 11 sacks. The game was played in Detroit on Thanksgiving and pulled the Lions within one game of the division lead with three weeks left in the season. The game would be dubbed the "Thanksgiving Day Massacre" thanks to the dominant performance by the Lions defense. The Lions and Packers both won their next two games, but in the final week of the season, the Lions lost to the Chicago Bears, while the Packers defeated the Los Angeles Rams en route to a 13–1 season. The Packers went on to defeat the Giants for their eighth NFL championship.
- Lions 21, Packers 17 (December 15, 1991) – The Lions staved off a last minute comeback attempt by the Packers offense led by quarterback Mike Tomczak to wrap up a four-point victory over the Packers at Lambeau Field. The game was the last time the Lions defeated the Packers in the state of Wisconsin until 2015, as the Packers held a 24-game home winning streak in the series. That season would also be the last time that Detroit swept Green Bay until 2017.
- Packers 28, Lions 24 (January 8, 1994) – This was the first ever playoff meeting between these two teams. In week 17 the Lions defeated the Packers 30–20 giving them home field advantage for this game. With Green Bay trailing 24–21 late in the game Brett Favre hit Sterling Sharpe for a 40-yard touchdown pass with 55 seconds left, giving Green Bay the lead and ultimately the win. This was the first time the Lions had ever lost a home playoff game, and was their last home playoff game for 30 years.
- Packers 16, Lions 12 (December 31, 1994) – For the second consecutive season the Packers and Lions met in the playoffs, this time at Lambeau Field. The Packers held Barry Sanders to -1 yards rushing and the Lions to -4 yards rushing overall. The Packers never trailed as they led 10–0 at half time and only allowed 10 points in the second half before intentionally committing a safety on the last play of the game to run out the clock. This was the Packers' first victory at Lambeau Field against the Lions since 1985 (though they beat the Lions in all four Milwaukee games against them during that time).
- Packers 31, Lions 21 (December 28, 2008) – The Packers defeated the Lions in Week 17. With the loss, the Lions became the first team in NFL history to go 0–16 season in a 16-game season.
- Lions 7, Packers 3 (December 12, 2010) – Aaron Rodgers was knocked out of the game before the half and missed the rest of the game as well as the Packers' next game against the Patriots. Matt Flynn led the Packers to a field goal that gave them a 3–0 lead in the 3rd quarter. The Lions scored a touchdown in the 4th quarter and won 7–3. This forced the Packers to win their final two games of the season to make the playoffs. They did so and won Super Bowl XLV.
- Packers 45, Lions 41 (January 1, 2012) – With the Packers having already clinched home field advantage in the playoffs, backup quarterback Matt Flynn started in place of Aaron Rodgers and went on to throw a team record six touchdown passes in a shootout victory over the Lions at Lambeau Field. This is the highest scoring game between both rivals at 86 points, and the first time both teams met after each one accumulated at least 10 regular season victories.

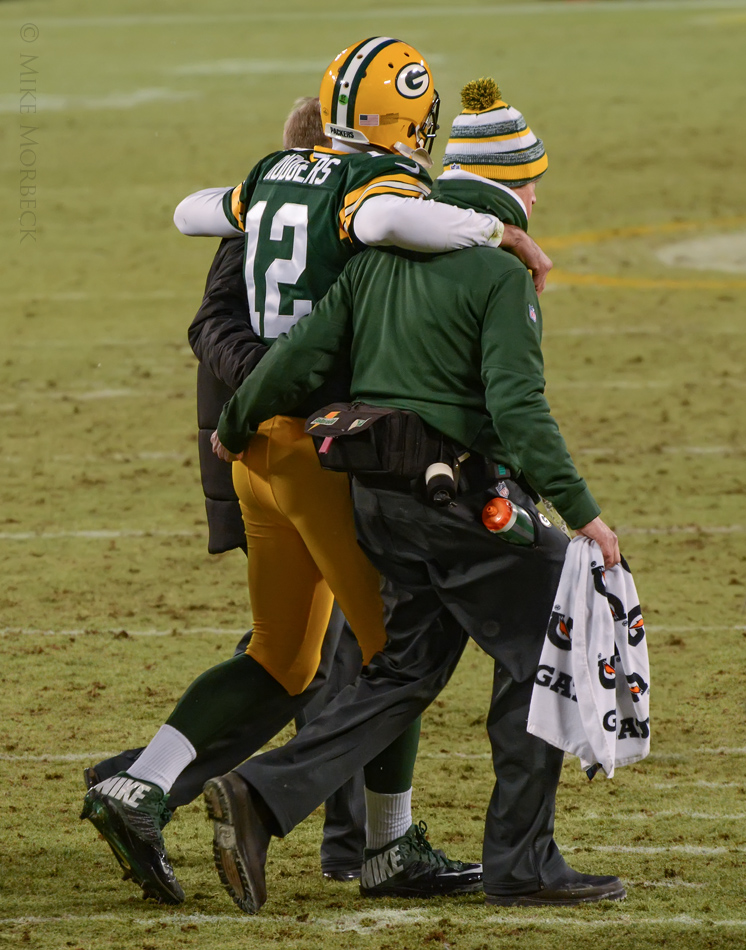
Aaron Rodgers being helped off the field after injuring his calf in the 2014 game against the Lions. He would return in the second half and lead the Packers to victory.

- Packers 30, Lions 20 (December 28, 2014) – The Packers and Lions entered this Week 17 match up with identical 11–4 records. Therefore, this game was for the 2014 NFC North Division Championship. Green Bay jumped out to a 14–0 lead before Aaron Rodgers left the game after re-injuring his calf. Rodgers would return in the second half after the Lions had tied the game at 14. The Packers ended up scoring a pair of touchdowns and forcing a safety before the Lions scored a late touchdown. Both teams would make the playoffs as the win gave the Packers their fourth straight division championship while the Lions ended up as a Wild Card team.
- Packers home winning streak (1992–2014) – The Lions had not beaten the Packers in a road game from 1992 to 2014. With Green Bay's 30–20 win over Detroit on December 28, 2014, the Packers had defeated the Lions in the state of Wisconsin 24 straight times, including a Wild Card Playoff game on December 31, 1994. The last Lions victory before the streak began in Wisconsin was a 21–17 win on December 15, 1991. The Lions ended the streak with an 18–16 victory on November 15, 2015.
- Lions 18, Packers 16 (November 15, 2015) – Matt Prater missed two extra-point attempts, including one late in the fourth quarter. With Green Bay trailing 18–10 late in the fourth quarter, the Packers scored a touchdown on the ensuing drive, to trim the Lions lead to 18–16, and failed on the two-point conversion, but then recovered the onside kick when Calvin Johnson couldn't secure the ball with 31 seconds left. Mason Crosby's 52-yard attempt on the game's final play was muffed, giving the Lions their first win in Green Bay since 1991.
- Packers 27, Lions 23 (December 3, 2015) – In the largest comeback in series history, the Packers overcame a 20-point deficit to win the game 27–23. The Lions appeared to have won the game 23–21, but a facemask penalty was called against them as time expired. Since NFL games cannot end on a defensive penalty even if time has expired, an untimed play was given to the Packers. On the final play, Aaron Rodgers completed a 61-yard Hail Mary pass to tight end Richard Rodgers. The Packers then took a knee on the extra point. With the win, the Packers avoided what would have been their first series sweep by the Lions since 1991. This was the longest game-winning, game-ending Hail Mary in NFL history. The game would be dubbed the Miracle in Motown shortly thereafter.
- Packers 31, Lions 24 (January 1, 2017) – For the second time in three seasons the Packers and Lions met in week 17 for the NFC North Division Title. The Packers and Lions both entered the game with a 9–6 record. Due to an earlier Redskins loss, both teams had clinched a playoff spot before kickoff. The Lions led 14–10 at the half but the Packers went on a 21–3 scoring run on three Aaron Rodgers touchdown passes and appeared to put the game away. However, Matthew Stafford hit Anquan Boldin in desperation for a 35-yard touchdown pass with 13 seconds left and forced an onside kick attempt. The Packers recovered and held on to win their fifth division championship in six years.
- Lions 31, Packers 0 (December 30, 2018) – The Lions shutout the Packers for the first time since 1973 and at Lambeau Field for the first time since 1970. The Lions also swept the Packers for the second consecutive season. Aaron Rodgers got knocked out early in the game with a concussion, forcing backup quarterback DeShone Kizer to play most of the game. Lions kicker Matt Prater threw a touchdown pass to tight end Levine Toilolo and cornerback Quandre Diggs sealed the game with an interception of Kizer with five minutes left to play.
- Packers 23, Lions 22 (October 14, 2019) – This Monday Night Football game at Lambeau Field was close all the way, as the Packers committed multiple turnovers in a game where the Lions offense struggled. The Packers did not win the game until the last second where kicker Mason Crosby made a game-winning field goal. However, the game was criticized for poor officiating. Two highly questionable hands to the face penalties on Lions defensive end Trey Flowers extended two Packers scoring drives in the 4th quarter, causing outrage from fans and the media.
- Lions 20, Packers 16 (January 8, 2023) – On this edition of Sunday Night Football, the Lions and Packers faced off at Lambeau Field, with the Packers needing a victory to clinch the last playoff spot in the NFC. After a 9–6 halftime deficit, the Lions rebounded to a 20–16 victory to stun the Packers and knock them out of the playoff race. The game was characterized by two costly Packers turnovers, undisciplined play from multiple Packer defenders, and several missed opportunities. With the loss, the Packers fell to an 8–9 record, giving them their third losing season in seven years. This was Rodgers' final game as a Packer, as he was traded to the New York Jets the following offseason.

== Results ==
	Packers wins	Ties	Lions wins	Packers points	Lions points
Regular season	106	7	79	4,115	3,639
Postseason	2	0	0	44	36
Total	108	7	79	4,159	3,675

Updated October 25, 2026

== Season-by-season results ==
Green Bay Packers vs. Portsmouth Spartans/Detroit Lions Season-by-Season Results
1930s (Packers, 13–5–1)

Season	Season series	at Portsmouth Spartans/Detroit Lions	at Green Bay Packers	Overall series	Notes
1930	Packers 1–0–1	Tie; 6–6	Packers; 47–13	Packers; 1–0–1	Portsmouth Spartans join the National Football League (NFL) as an expansion team. Packers finish with the best record (10–3–1) and were named the NFL champions.
1932	Tie 1–1	Spartans; 19–0	Packers; 15–10	Packers; 2–1–1	Packers' win was the Spartans only loss in the original schedule of the 1932 season. Due to that loss, the Spartans were tied with the Bears for the best record, necessitating a tiebreaker playoff game.
1933	Tie 1–1	Spartans; 7–0	Packers; 17–0	Packers; 3–2–1	Due to the popularity and success of the 1932 NFL Playoff Game, the league divided its teams into two divisions, with the Packers and Spartans placed in the NFL Western Division, becoming divisional rivals. Last season Spartans played as a Portsmouth-based team under the name "Spartans".
1934	Tie 1–1	Packers; 3–0	Lions; 3–0	Packers; 4–3–1	Spartans relocate to Detroit and rename themselves to the Detroit Lions. Packers' win handed the Lions their first loss of the season after a 10–0 start.
1935	Packers 2–1	Lions; 20–10	Packers; 13–9 †	Packers; 6–4–1	Only time both teams met three times in the regular season. Packers' home games include one game in Milwaukee and one in Green Bay. Lions win 1935 NFL Championship.
1935	Packers 2–1	Lions; 20–10	Packers; 31–7	Packers; 6–4–1	Only time both teams met three times in the regular season. Packers' home games include one game in Milwaukee and one in Green Bay. Lions win 1935 NFL Championship.
1936	Packers 2–0	Packers; 26–17	Packers; 20–18	Packers; 8–4–1	Packers win 1936 NFL Championship.
1937	Packers 2–0	Packers; 14–13	Packers; 26–6	Packers; 10–4–1	
1938	Tie 1–1	Packers; 28–7	Lions; 17–7	Packers; 11–5–1	Lions' win is the Packers only home loss in the 1938 season. Packers lose 1938 NFL Championship.
1939	Packers 2–0	Packers; 12–7	Packers; 26–7	Packers; 13–5–1	Packers win 1939 NFL Championship.
† Denotes a Packers home game played in Milwaukee

1940s (Packers, 16–4)

Season	Season series	at Detroit Lions	at Green Bay Packers	Overall series	Notes
1940	Tie 1–1	Packers; 50–7	Lions; 23–14	Packers; 14–6–1	In Detroit, the Packers record their largest victory against the Lions with a 43–point differential.
1941	Packers 2–0	Packers; 24–7	Packers; 23–0	Packers; 16–6–1	Lions move to Tiger Stadium.
1942	Packers 2–0	Packers; 28–7	Packers; 38–7 †	Packers; 18–6–1	
1943	Packers 2–0	Packers; 27–6	Packers; 35–14	Packers; 20–6–1	
1944	Packers 2–0	Packers; 14–0	Packers; 27–6 †	Packers; 22–6–1	Packers win 9 straight road meetings (1936–1944). Packers win 1944 NFL Championship.
1945	Tie 1–1	Lions; 14–3	Packers; 57–21 †	Packers; 23–7–1	In Milwaukee, the Packers set a franchise record for their most points scored in a game. Packers win 10 straight meetings (1940–1945).
1946	Packers 2–0	Packers; 9–0	Packers; 10–7 †	Packers; 25–7–1	
1947	Packers 2–0	Packers; 35–14	Packers; 34–17	Packers; 27–7–1	
1948	Tie 1–1	Lions; 24–20	Packers; 33–21	Packers; 28–8–1	
1949	Tie 1–1	Lions; 21–7	Packers; 16–14 †	Packers; 29–9–1	Packers' win was their only home win in the 1949 season. Packers win 9 straight home meetings (1941–1949).
† Denotes a Packers home game played in Milwaukee

1950s (Lions, 15–4–1)

Season	Season series	at Detroit Lions	at Green Bay Packers	Overall series	Notes
1950	Lions 2–0	Lions; 24–21	Lions; 45–7	Packers; 29–11–1	As a result of the AAFC–NFL merger, the Lions and Packers were placed in the NFL National Conference (later renamed to the NFL Western Conference in the 1953 season). Lions record their first season series sweep of the Packers.
1951	Lions 2–0	Lions; 52–35	Lions; 24–17	Packers; 29–13–1	Game in Detroit was played on Thanksgiving. In that game, the Lions scored their most points in a game against the Packers and set a franchise record for their most points in a game (broken in 1997).
1952	Lions 2–0	Lions; 48–24	Lions; 52–17	Packers; 29–15–1	In Green Bay, the Lions tied their most points scored in a game against the Packers. Game in Detroit was played on Thanksgiving. Lions win 1952 NFL Championship.
1953	Lions 2–0	Lions; 34–15	Lions; 14–7	Packers; 29–17–1	Game in Detroit was played on Thanksgiving. Lions win 1953 NFL Championship.
1954	Lions 2–0	Lions; 28–24	Lions; 21–17	Packers; 29–19–1	Game in Detroit was played on Thanksgiving. Lions win 11 straight meetings (1949–1954). Lions lose 1954 NFL Championship.
1955	Tie 1–1	Lions; 24–10	Packers; 20–17	Packers; 30–20–1	Game in Detroit was played on Thanksgiving.
1956	Tie 1–1	Packers; 24–20	Lions; 20–16	Packers; 31–21–1	Game in Detroit was played on Thanksgiving.
1957	Lions 2–0	Lions; 18–6	Lions; 24–14	Packers; 31–23–1	Packers open Lambeau Field. Game in Detroit was played on Thanksgiving. Lions win 1957 NFL Championship.
1958	Lions 1–0–1	Lions; 24–14	Tie; 13–13	Packers; 31–24–2	Game in Detroit was played on Thanksgiving.
1959	Packers 2–0	Packers; 24–17	Packers; 28–10	Packers; 33–24–2	Game in Detroit was played on Thanksgiving.

1960s (Packers, 11–6–3)

Season	Season series	at Detroit Lions	at Green Bay Packers	Overall series	Notes
1960	Tie 1–1	Lions; 23–10	Packers; 28–9	Packers; 34–25–2	Game in Detroit was played on Thanksgiving.
1961	Tie 1–1	Packers; 17–9	Lions; 17–13 †	Packers; 35–26–2	Lions' win is the Packers' only home loss in the 1961 season. After that loss, the Packers went on a 14-game home winning streak. Game in Detroit was played on Thanksgiving. Packers win 1961 NFL Championship.
1962	Tie 1–1	Lions; 26–14	Packers; 9–7	Packers; 36–27–2	Game in Detroit was played on Thanksgiving, where the Lions' win handed the Packers their only loss of the 1962 season. Packers win 1962 NFL Championship.
1963	Packers 1–0–1	Tie; 13–13	Packers; 31–10 †	Packers; 37–27–3	Game in Detroit was played on Thanksgiving.
1964	Packers 2–0	Packers; 14–10	Packers; 30–7	Packers; 39–27–3	
1965	Tie 1–1	Packers; 31–21	Lions; 12–7	Packers; 40–28–3	In Detroit, Packers overcame a 21–3 second-half deficit. Lions' win is the Packers only home loss in the 1965 season. Packers win 1965 NFL Championship.
1966	Packers 2–0	Packers; 31–7	Packers; 23–14	Packers; 42–28–3	Packers win 1966 NFL Championship and Super Bowl I.
1967	Packers 1–0–1	Packers; 27–17	Tie; 17–17	Packers; 43–28–4	As a result of expansion, the two eight-team divisions became two eight-team conferences split into two divisions, with the Lions and Packers placed in the NFL Central division. Packers win 1967 NFL Championship and Super Bowl II.
1968	Lions 1–0–1	Tie; 14–14	Lions; 23–17	Packers; 43–29–5	
1969	Tie 1–1	Packers; 28–17	Lions; 16–10	Packers; 44–30–5	
† Denotes a Packers home game played in Milwaukee

1970s (Tie, 9–9–2)

Season	Season series	at Detroit Lions	at Green Bay Packers	Overall series	Notes
1970	Lions 2–0	Lions; 20–0	Lions; 40–0	Packers; 44–32–5	As a result of the AFL–NFL merger, the Lions and Packers were placed in the National Football Conference (NFC) and the NFC Central (later renamed to the NFC North in the 2002 season). In Green Bay, Lions record their largest victory against the Packers with a 40–point differential.
1971	Lions 1–0–1	Lions; 31–28	Tie; 14–14 †	Packers; 44–33–6	
1972	Packers 2–0	Packers; 24–23	Packers; 33–7	Packers; 46–33–6	In Detroit, Packers overcame a 17–0 deficit.
1973	Lions 1–0–1	Lions; 34–0	Tie; 13–13	Packers; 46–34–7	
1974	Tie 1–1	Lions; 19–17	Packers; 21–19 †	Packers; 47–35–7	
1975	Lions 2–0	Lions; 13–10	Lions; 30–16 †	Packers; 47–37–7	Lions open Pontiac Silverdome.
1976	Tie 1–1	Lions; 27–6	Packers; 24–14	Packers; 48–38–7	
1977	Tie 1–1	Lions; 10–6	Packers; 10–9	Packers; 49–39–7	
1978	Packers 2–0	Packers; 13–7	Packers; 35–14 †	Packers; 51–39–7	
1979	Packers 2–0	Packers; 18–13	Packers; 24–16 †	Packers; 53–39–7	
† Denotes a Packers home game played in Milwaukee

1980s (Lions, 13–7)

Season	Season series	at Detroit Lions	at Green Bay Packers	Overall series	Notes
1980	Lions 2–0	Lions; 24–3	Lions; 29–7 †	Packers; 53–41–7	
1981	Tie 1–1	Lions; 31–27	Packers; 31–17	Packers; 54–42–7	
1982	Lions 2–0	Lions; 27–24	Lions; 30–10	Packers; 54–44–7	Both games are played despite the 1982 NFL Players strike reducing the season to 9 games.
1983	Lions 2–0	Lions; 38–14	Lions; 23–20 (OT) †	Packers; 54–46–7	In Green Bay, Lions overcame a 20–3 second-half deficit.
1984	Tie 1–1	Lions; 31–28	Packers; 41–9	Packers; 55–47–7	Game in Detroit was played on Thanksgiving.
1985	Packers 2–0	Packers; 26–23	Packers; 43–10	Packers; 57–47–7	
1986	Tie 1–1	Packers; 44–40	Lions; 21–14	Packers; 58–48–7	Game in Detroit was played on Thanksgiving.
1987	Tie 1–1	Packers; 34–33	Lions; 19–16 (OT)	Packers; 59–49–7	
1988	Lions 2–0	Lions; 30–14	Lions; 19–9 †	Packers; 59–51–7	
1989	Tie 1–1	Lions; 31–22	Packers; 23–20 (OT) †	Packers; 60–52–7	
† Denotes a Packers home game played in Milwaukee

1990s (Packers, 13–9)

Season	Season series	at Detroit Lions	at Green Bay Packers	Overall series	Notes
1990	Tie 1–1	Packers; 24–21	Lions; 24–17	Packers; 61–53–7	
1991	Lions 2–0	Lions; 23–14	Lions; 21–17	Packers; 61–55–7	This would be the Lions' last road win until the 2015 season, and their last season series sweep until the 2017 season.
1992	Packers 2–0	Packers; 27–13	Packers; 38–10 †	Packers; 63–55–7	Packers trade for Falcons' QB Brett Favre, who makes his debut in the series.
1993	Tie 1–1	Lions; 30–20	Packers; 26–17 †	Packers; 64–56–7	Lions' win gives them a home-field advantage for the NFC Wild Card Round the following week.
1993 Playoffs	Packers 1–0	Packers; 28–24		Packers; 65–56–7	NFC Wild Card Round. Packers win on a last-minute touchdown pass from QB Brett Favre to WR Sterling Sharpe. This would be the last home playoff game for the Lions until the 2023 playoffs.
1994	Tie 1–1	Lions; 34–31	Packers; 38–30 †	Packers; 66–57–7	The Lions and Packers played each other five times during the 1994 calendar year (Week 18 of the 1993 season, a 1993 postseason game, two 1994 regular season games, and a 1994 postseason game), becoming the first and only time in NFL history two teams have faced each other five times in a calendar year. Last meeting in Milwaukee, as the Packers were set to play solely in Green Bay beginning the next season. Both teams finished with 9–7 records along with the Chicago Bears, but the Packers clinched the better playoff seed based on having the best head-to-head record, setting up a playoff game at Green Bay the following week.
1994 Playoffs	Packers 1–0		Packers; 16–12	Packers; 67–57–7	NFC Wild Card Round. Lions' RB Barry Sanders held to –1 rushing yards.
1995	Tie 1–1	Lions; 24–16	Packers; 30–21	Packers; 68–58–7	
1996	Packers 2–0	Packers; 31–3	Packers; 28–18	Packers; 70–58–7	Packers win Super Bowl XXXI.
1997	Tie 1–1	Lions; 26–15	Packers; 20–10	Packers; 71–59–7	At the end of the season, Packers' QB Brett Favre and Lions' RB Barry Sanders both won the Most Valuable Player (MVP) award, becoming the first co-winners. Packers lose Super Bowl XXXII.
1998	Tie 1–1	Lions; 27–20	Packers; 38–19	Packers; 72–60–7	
1999	Tie 1–1	Lions; 23–15	Packers; 26–17	Packers; 73–61–7	Both teams finished with 8–8 records, but the Lions clinched the final playoff berth based on a better record against common opponents, eliminating the Packers from playoff contention.
† Denotes a Packers home game played in Milwaukee

2000s (Packers, 17–3)

Season	Season series	at Detroit Lions	at Green Bay Packers	Overall series	Notes
2000	Tie 1–1	Lions; 31–24	Packers; 26–13	Packers; 74–62–7	
2001	Packers 2–0	Packers; 29–27	Packers; 28–6	Packers; 76–62–7	Game in Detroit was played on Thanksgiving.
2002	Packers 2–0	Packers; 37–31	Packers; 40–14	Packers; 78–62–7	Lions open Ford Field.
2003	Tie 1–1	Lions; 22–14	Packers; 31–6	Packers; 79–63–7	Game in Detroit was played on Thanksgiving.
2004	Packers 2–0	Packers; 38–10	Packers; 16–13	Packers; 81–63–7	
2005	Tie 1–1	Lions; 17–3	Packers; 16–13 (OT)	Packers; 82–64–7	Packers draft QB Aaron Rodgers.
2006	Packers 2–0	Packers; 31–24	Packers; 17–9	Packers; 84–64–7	
2007	Packers 2–0	Packers; 37–26	Packers; 34–13	Packers; 86–64–7	Game in Detroit was played on Thanksgiving. Starting with that loss, the Lions went on a 19-game divisional losing streak. Game in Green Bay was QB Brett Favre's final game as a Packers' quarterback.
2008	Packers 2–0	Packers; 48–25	Packers; 31–21	Packers; 88–64–7	Packers' QB Aaron Rodgers makes his debut in the series. In Green Bay, the Lions complete the first 0–16 winless season in NFL history with their loss.
2009	Packers 2–0	Packers; 34–12	Packers; 26–0	Packers; 90–64–7	Game in Detroit was played on Thanksgiving.

2010s (Packers, 12–8)

Season	Season series	at Detroit Lions	at Green Bay Packers	Overall series	Notes
2010	Tie 1–1	Lions; 7–3	Packers; 28–26	Packers; 91–65–7	Packers win 10 straight meetings (2005–2010). Lions' win snapped their 19-game divisional losing streak. Packers win Super Bowl XLV.
2011	Packers 2–0	Packers; 27–15	Packers; 45–41	Packers; 93–65–7	Game in Detroit was played on Thanksgiving. In Green Bay, Packers' backup QB Matt Flynn threw for 6 touchdowns in what became known as the Matt Flynn Game. Lions quarterback Matthew Stafford threw for 520 yards, while Matt Flynn passed for 480 yards, with both setting franchise records for the most passing yards in a single game for their respective teams. The 45–41 score is the highest total score in the history of the series (86 points).
2012	Packers 2–0	Packers; 24–20	Packers; 27–20	Packers; 95–65–7	
2013	Tie 1–1	Lions; 40–10	Packers; 22–9	Packers; 96–66–7	Game in Detroit was played on Thanksgiving.
2014	Tie 1–1	Lions; 19–7	Packers; 30–20	Packers; 97–67–7	The Packers clinched the NFC North and a first-round bye with their win, while the Lions were regulated to the 6th seed. Packers win 24 straight home meetings (1992–2014).
2015	Tie 1–1	Packers; 27–23	Lions; 18–16	Packers; 98–68–7	Lions' first road win against the Packers since the 1991 season. In Detroit, Packers overcame a 20–0 second-half deficit, and Packers' QB Aaron Rodgers threw a game-winning 61-yard Hail Mary touchdown pass to TE Richard Rodgers on the game's final play.
2016	Packers 2–0	Packers; 31–24	Packers; 34–27	Packers; 100–68–7	In Detroit, the Packers clinched the NFC North and recorded their 100th win over the Lions with their win, becoming the first NFL team to beat a single opponent 100 times.
2017	Lions 2–0	Lions; 35–11	Lions; 30–17	Packers; 100–70–7	Lions sweep the season series against the Packers for the first time since the 1991 season.
2018	Lions 2–0	Lions; 31–23	Lions; 31–0	Packers; 100–72–7	
2019	Packers 2–0	Packers; 23–20	Packers; 23–22	Packers; 102–72–7	In Detroit, the Packers clinched a first-round bye with their win.

2020s (Lions, 7–6)

Season	Season series	at Detroit Lions	at Green Bay Packers	Overall series	Notes
2020	Packers 2–0	Packers; 31–24	Packers; 42–21	Packers; 104–72–7	In Detroit, the Packers clinched the NFC North with their win.
2021	Tie 1–1	Lions; 37–30	Packers; 35–17	Packers; 105–73–7	
2022	Lions 2–0	Lions; 15–9	Lions; 20–16	Packers; 105–75–7	In Green Bay, the Lions eliminate the Packers from playoff contention with their win. It was also the final game Aaron Rodgers played as a Packers' quarterback.
2023	Tie 1–1	Packers; 29–22	Lions; 34–20	Packers; 106–76–7	Game in Detroit was played on Thanksgiving.
2024	Lions 2–0	Lions; 34–31	Lions; 24–14	Packers; 106–78–7	The Lions clinched a playoff berth with their home win. Lions win all their division games for the first time in franchise history.
2025	Packers 2–0	Packers; 31–24	Packers; 27–13	Packers; 108–78–7	Game in Detroit was played on Thanksgiving.
2026	Lions 1–0	Lions; 20–17	January 9/10	Packers; 108–79–7	

Summary of Results

Season	Season series	at Portsmouth Spartans/Detroit Lions	at Green Bay Packers	Notes
Regular season	Packers 106–79–7	Lions 49–44–3	Packers 62–30–4	
Postseason	Packers 2–0	Packers 1–0	Packers 1–0	NFC Wild Card: 1993, 1994
Regular and postseason	Packers 108–79–7	Lions 49–45–3	Packers 63–30–4	Spartans/Lions have a 2–0–1 record in Portsmouth, Ohio. Packers have a 14–5–1 record in Milwaukee and currently have a 49–25–3 record in Green Bay.

== See also ==
- List of NFL rivalries
- NFC North
