= Miracle in Motown =

2015 Hail Mary play

Green Bay Packers (7–4)	Detroit Lions (4–7)
27	23
Head coach: Mike McCarthy	Head coach: Jim Caldwell
	1	2	3	4	Total
GB	0	0	14	13	27
DET	17	0	3	3	23
- Date: December 3, 2015
- Stadium: Ford Field; Detroit, Michigan, U.S.
- Favorite: Packers by 3
- Referee: Carl Cheffers
- Attendance: 63,207

TV in the United States
- Network: CBS, NFL Network
- Announcers: Jim Nantz, Phil Simms, Tracy Wolfson

The Miracle in Motown was a National Football League (NFL) game played on December 3, 2015, between the Green Bay Packers and Detroit Lions. The game, which was broadcast on television nationally on Thursday Night Football, was contested at Ford Field in Detroit, Michigan, United States, during the 2015 NFL season. On the final play of regulation, with no time remaining on the game clock and Detroit leading 23–21, Packers quarterback Aaron Rodgers threw a 61-yard (56 m) Hail Mary pass into the end zone that was caught by tight end Richard Rodgers for the game-winning walk-off touchdown.

The play resulted in a dramatic 27–23 come-from-behind victory for the Packers, who had trailed 20–0 in the second half. The victory was the fourth-largest comeback in franchise history. It was also the start of a three-game winning streak that would help the Packers clinch their seventh consecutive postseason berth. The play won the NFL Play of the Year award for the 2015 season and was named the year's best play in North American sports at the 2016 ESPY Awards.

== Background ==
During the 2015 NFL season, the Green Bay Packers and Detroit Lions were scheduled to play each other twice, continuing their rivalry that began in 1930. In Week 10, the Lions beat the Packers at Lambeau Field with a score of 18–16. The victory was the first for the Lions at Lambeau Field in 24 years.

The Packers began the season with a record of 6–0 before losing three straight, including the Week 10 match-up against the Lions. The Packers entered the Week 13 match-up against the Lions at Ford Field with a record of 7–4, after a 30–13 victory against the Minnesota Vikings, who the Packers were battling for the division lead. The Lions came into the game following three consecutive victories after a 1–7 start to the season. With a victory in this game, which was broadcast nationally on Thursday Night Football, the Lions would achieve their first season sweep of the Packers since 1991. The Packers entered the game as 3-point favorites.

== Game summary ==
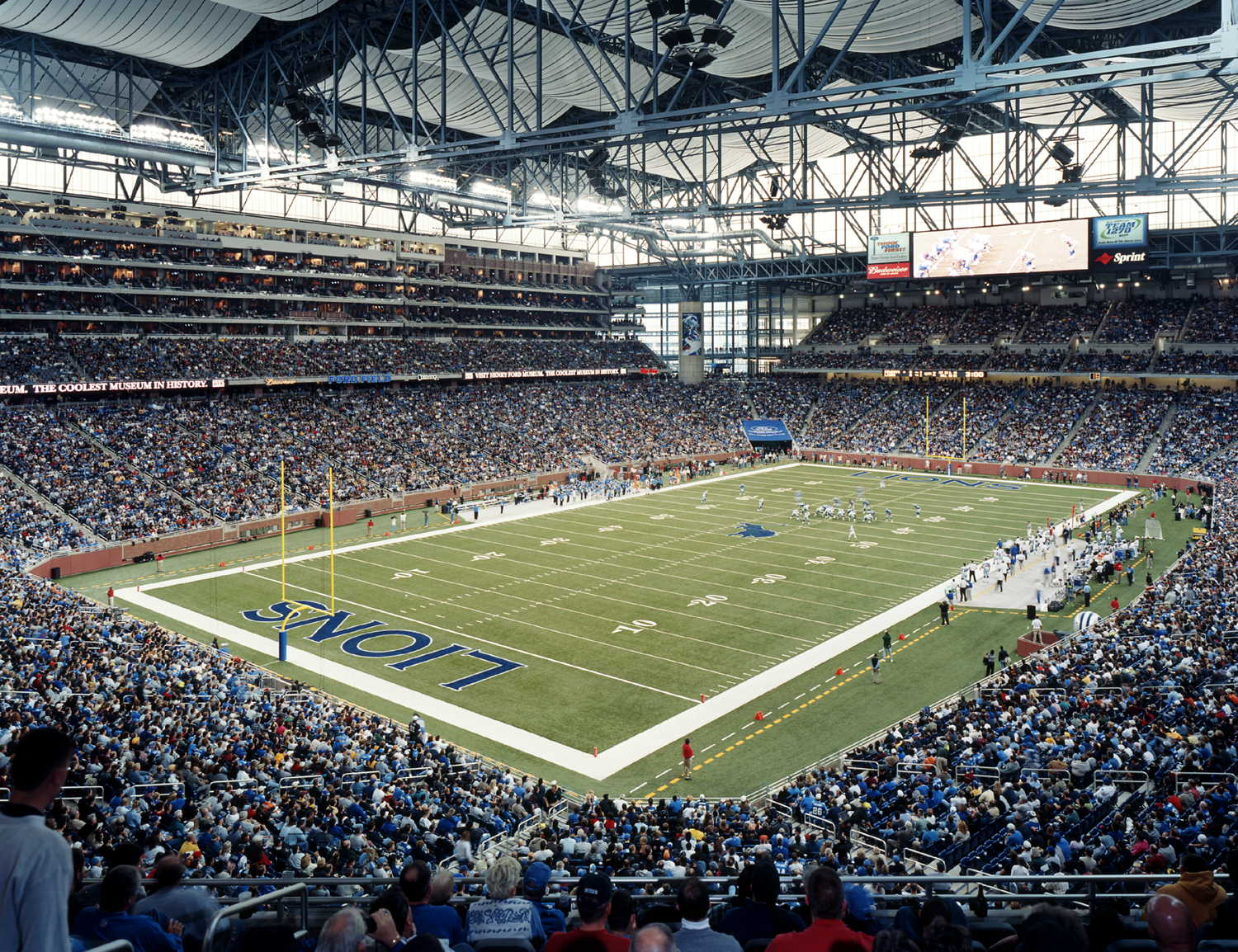
Ford Field was the site of the game.

=== First half ===
The Packers began the game with a short drive ending in a punt. The Lions started their first drive on their own 32-yard line. After driving 35 yards, the Packers stopped the Lions on third down, forcing a 51-yard field goal attempt, which Matt Prater converted to put the Lions up 3–0. The Packers again failed to move the ball, going three-and-out and punting again, this time to the Lions 24-yard line. The Lions put together an 8-play, 76-yard touchdown drive, with Ameer Abdullah's 36-yard rush being the longest play of the drive. Matthew Stafford completed a 3-yard touchdown pass to Eric Ebron to increase Detroit's lead to 10–0. After the ensuing kickoff, the Packers started their drive at the 20-yard line. After a 2-yard rush by Eddie Lacy, Aaron Rodgers threw an interception to Glover Quin at the 41-yard line, who brought the ball back to the 17-yard line. On the first play of the drive, Stafford threw a 17-yard touchdown to Calvin Johnson, putting the Lions up 17–0 right before the end of the first quarter. The Packers had a long drive for the first time on the ensuing possession. A 40-yard defensive pass interference penalty on the Lions brought the ball to mid-field. A. Rodgers completed a 19-yard pass to Richard Rodgers before being sacked on third down. The Packers attempted a field goal, although Mason Crosby missed the attempt, hitting the left upright. The next seven drives in the first half ended in punts, with neither team gaining more than 20 yards.

=== Second half ===
The Lions began the second half with an 11-play, 66-yard drive that ended in a 34-yard field goal by Prater. Stafford completed five passes to four different receivers on the drive for 61 yards, with the field goal bringing the Lions lead to 20–0. The Packers started their next drive on the 25-yard line. A. Rodgers completed a 26-yard pass to R. Rodgers on third down to get the Packers to mid-field. After two rushes for four and twelve yards, A. Rodgers completed a 25-yard pass to James Starks, who was downed at the 8-yard line. Starks received the hand-off on the next play and then proceeded to fumble the ball forward into the end zone, where it was recovered by Randall Cobb for a touchdown. With the score 20–7, the Lions started their next drive at the 20-yard line. On their first play, Stafford was sacked by Julius Peppers and fumbled the ball, which the Packers recovered at the 12-yard line. After two short completions, A. Rodger threw an 8-yard touchdown pass to Davante Adams, bringing the score to 20–14. The Lions and Packers traded punts on a short drive by each before the Lions put together a 13-play, 34 yard drive that ended in a 42-yard field goal by Prater. Detroit's drive was extended by a defensive offsides penalty on the Packers, a fourth down conversion by the Lions, and a 10-yard scramble by Stafford. The Packers regained possession down 23–14, starting at their own 16-yard line. The Packers put together an 11-play, 84-yard drive, which included a 16-yard completion to Cobb to convert on fourth down. On third down, with 17 yards to go, A. Rodgers escaped the pocket and rushed for a 17-yard touchdown run, bringing the score to 23–21 with just over 3 minutes left in the fourth quarter. Stafford completed a 29-yard pass to Golden Tate on third down to extend the Lion's drive, but after three consecutive rushes for a total of -3 yards, the Lions punted the ball 35 yards to the Packers 21-yard line with 30 seconds left in the game. After two incompletions, the Packers were faced with a third down and 10 yards to go with 6 seconds left on the clock.

==== Final plays ====
Nantz: How far can Rodgers throw it?
Simms: He can make it to the end zone if he gets out of the pocket, gets a little running start, but then can – can the receivers get far enough down the field?
Nantz: ...Rodgers, in trouble...
Simms: It's gonna get there.
Nantz: He turned 32 yesterday, does he have a vintage moment in him? In the end zone... it is caught for the win! Richard Rodgers with a walk-off touchdown! A game-ender for the Packers! Total disbelief at Ford Field. The Packers, saved by the face mask call, given one last chance, and Aaron Rodgers heaves it as far as he can, and Richard Rodgers II, boxing out in the end zone for the touchdown.

— TNF's Jim Nantz and Phil Simms calling the Hail Mary

On the third down play, the Packers attempted to throw the ball short and then lateral the ball to their teammates (similar to a hook and ladder play). Aaron Rodgers completed the pass down the left side of the field to James Jones, who proceeded to lateral the ball to Richard Rodgers. Richard Rodgers then threw the ball back to Aaron Rodgers, who was trailing the play. He was tackled at his 24-yard line by Devin Taylor, with the game clock having gone to zero during the play. However, two officials threw flags on the play, with a 15-yard face mask penalty ultimately being assessed on Taylor. NFL rules stated that a game cannot end on a defensive penalty, so the Packers were given an untimed play at their own 39-yard line after the penalty was assessed.

On the untimed play, all Packers receivers ran towards the end zone and Aaron Rodgers broke to his left before changing direction and scrambling to his right, escaping the Detroit defenders in the process, which provided time for the receivers to reach the end zone. He then threw a 61-yard (56 m) Hail Mary pass into the end zone. Richard Rodgers, who was the last player to reach the end zone and whose job on the play was to box out defenders and try to catch a tip, leapt high in the air and brought the ball down for the score. The touchdown resulted in the Packers winning 27–23 in walk-off fashion.

=== Box score ===
Week 13: Green Bay Packers at Detroit Lions – Game summary

Quarter	1	2	3	4	Total
Packers	0	0	14	13	27
Lions	17	0	3	3	23

at Ford Field in Detroit, Michigan

- Date: Thursday, December 3, 2015
- Game time: 8:25 p.m. EST
- Game weather: Played indoors (dome stadium)
- Game attendance: 63,207
- Referee: Carl Cheffers
- TV announcers (CBS/NFLN): Jim Nantz, Phil Simms and Tracy Wolfson
- Sources: NFL.com and ESPN.com

Game information

First quarter

- DET – Matt Prater 51-yard field goal, 8:53. Lions 3–0. Drive: 7 plays, 35 yards, 4:04.
- DET – Eric Ebron 3-yard pass from Matthew Stafford (Matt Prater kick), 1:53. Lions 10–0. Drive: 8 plays, 76 yards, 4:53.
- DET – Calvin Johnson 17-yard pass from Matthew Stafford (Matt Prater kick), 1:08. Lions 17–0. Drive: 1 play, 17 yards, 0:06.

Second quarter

- No scoring plays.

Third quarter

- DET – Matt Prater 34-yard field goal, 8:58. Lions 20-0. Drive: 11 plays, 66 yards, 6:06.
- GB – Randall Cobb fumble recovery in DET end zone (Mason Crosby kick), 5:53. Lions 20–7. Drive: 7 plays, 75 yards, 3:10.
- GB – Davante Adams 8-yard pass from Aaron Rodgers (Mason Crosby kick), 4:12. Lions 20–14. Drive: 3 plays, 12 yards, 1:31.

Fourth quarter

- DET – Matt Prater 42-yard field goal, 7:11. Lions 23-14. Drive: 13 plays, 34 yards, 6:29.
- GB – Aaron Rodgers 17-yard run (Mason Crosby kick), 3:12. Lions 23–21. Drive: 11 plays, 84 yards, 4:02.
- GB – Richard Rodgers 61-yard pass from Aaron Rodgers (rush failed), 0:00. Packers 27–23. Drive: 4 plays, 79 yards, 0:23.

Green Bay Packers stats

Passing

- Aaron Rodgers – 24/36, 273 yards, 2 touchdowns, 1 interception

Rushing

- Aaron Rodgers – 4 rushes, 27 yards, 1 touchdown
- John Crockett – 5 rushes, 22 yards
- James Starks – 9 rushes, 15 yards
- Eddie Lacy – 5 rushes, 4 yards
- Randall Cobb* – 1 rush, -1 yard

Receiving

- Richard Rodgers – 8 receptions, 146 yards, 1 touchdown
- James Starks – 5 receptions, 45 yards
- Randall Cobb* – 4 receptions, 29 yards
- Davante Adams – 4 receptions, 21 yards, 1 touchdown
- James Jones – 1 reception, 19 yards
- Jared Abbrederis – 1 reception, 16 yards
- Eddie Lacy – 1 reception, -3 yards
* Cobb scored a touchdown on a fumble recovery.
Detroit Lions stats

Passing

- Matthew Stafford – 23/35, 220 yards, 2 touchdowns

Rushing

- Ameer Abdullah – 13 rushes, 67 yards
- Matthew Stafford – 2 rushes, 22 yards
- Joique Bell – 8 rushes, 5 yards
- Theo Riddick – 1 rush, 4 yards
- Golden Tate – 1 rush, 3 yards

Receiving

- Golden Tate – 8 receptions, 63 yards
- Calvin Johnson – 3 receptions, 44 yards, 1 touchdown
- T. J. Jones – 2 receptions, 37 yards
- Theo Riddick – 5 receptions, 27 yards
- Joique Bell – 2 receptions, 25 yards
- Corey Fuller – 1 reception, 15 yards
- Eric Ebron – 2 receptions, 9 yards, 1 touchdown

=== Analysis ===
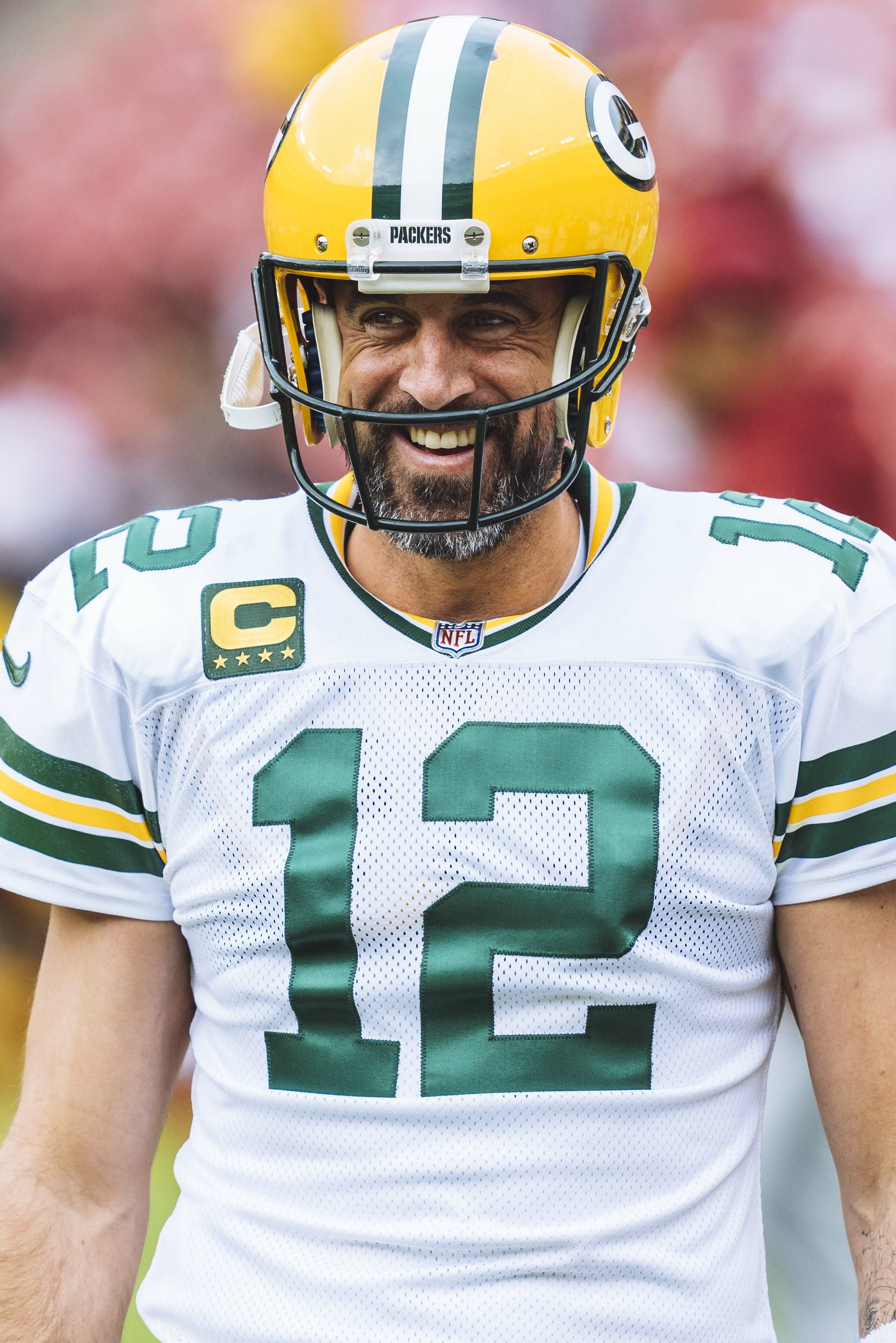
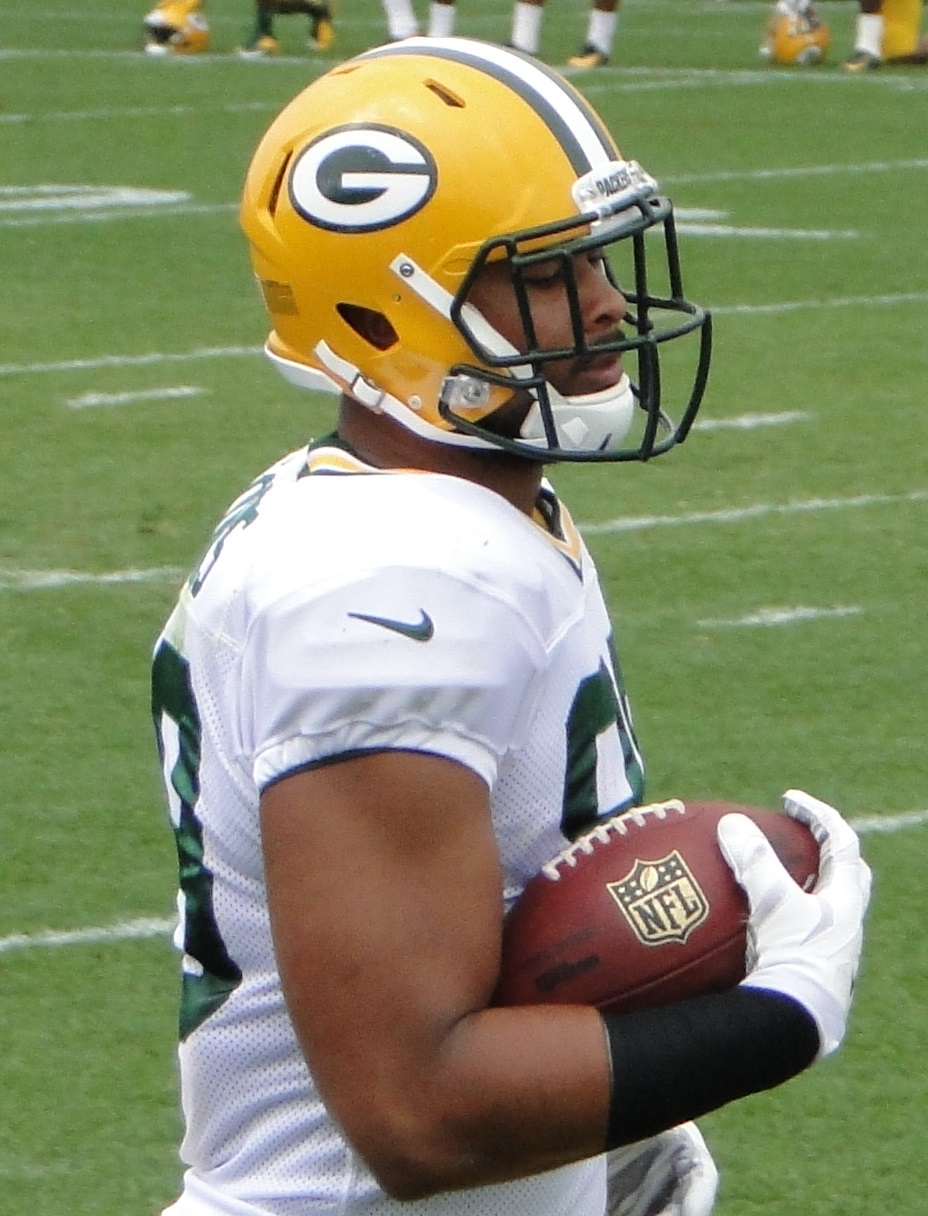
Aaron Rodgers (left) and Richard Rodgers (right) were both praised for their execution on the Hail Mary pass.

The Packers 20-point comeback was the fourth-largest in franchise history. Aaron Rodgers's throw on the Hail Mary was lauded for its arc and distance. According to a number of estimations, the pass traveled 66–68 yards (60–62 m) in the air before reaching the hands of Richard Rodgers. The throw was also high enough to nearly hit the rafters at Ford Field. He was also recognized for his scramble before the pass, which provided his receivers enough time to reach the end zone and provided him enough space to step into the throw to attain the necessary distance to reach his receivers. Mike McCarthy broke down the throw by saying "When you throw it with that arch [sic] you have a chance, because it gives guys a chance to fight for position. That's the whole design of it, and there's a design to where you try to get to and the triangle that you're trying to form (with teammates) down there. Richard is the perfect guy for that type of situation, big body and his ability to go up—you see his old basketball skills—and high-point the football". The 61-yard completion was the longest touchdown pass to end and win a game in NFL history up to that point.

The face mask penalty against Detroit that led to the winning play by Green Bay generated controversy, since replays appeared to show Taylor not grabbing Rodgers's facemask. Dean Blandino, NFL Vice President of Officiating, responded to the call on Twitter moments after the game by affirming the call. Blandino noted that "hand up to the mask, quick grab with finger and the head gets turned. At full speed, official is going to make that call almost every time". During a visit by NFL officials to a Lions training camp in 2016, Carl Cheffers, the official who threw the flag, was asked about the penalty; he said "I think it was an illegal tackle. Horse-collar, facemask, I think it was an illegal tackle. I'm very comfortable with it."

== Outcome ==
The win snapped a three-game losing streak for the Packers and was credited as saving the team's season. It also helped the Packers maintain pace with the Vikings for the NFC North title, however the Vikings would ultimately win the division, ending the Packers' 4-year streak of division titles. The Packers would still make the playoffs as a wild card team after finishing with a record of 10–6. In the playoffs, the Packers would defeat the Washington Redskins 35–18 in the Wild Card Round before falling to the Arizona Cardinals in the Divisional Round 20–26 (the game went into overtime after Rodgers completed another successful Hail Mary pass, this time to Jeff Janis, only for Arizona to win on their opening drive of the extra period largely through the efforts of Larry Fitzgerald). The loss effectively eliminated Detroit from playoff contention and after going 3–1 in their final four games, the Lions would finish the season in 3rd place in NFC North with a 7–9 record.

=== Naming the play ===
The nickname for the play, "Miracle in Motown", was first used by Jim Nantz during the nationally broadcast Thursday Night Football postgame show. The alliterative name alludes to its improbability ("miracle") and its location in Detroit, which is metonymously known as "Motown". Motown—which as a portmanteau of "motor" and "town" references Detroit's other nickname as the "Motor City"—is the name of a distinct musical style associated with Black musicians and soul music in the Detroit-area since the 1950s.

=== Legacy ===
The play marked the first of three successful Hail Marys in the span of 13 months for Aaron Rodgers. After the Hail Murray play in 2020, Rodgers was interviewed on The Pat McAfee Show to discuss the dynamics of throwing a good Hail Mary pass based on his previous successes. The play also contributed to an unlikely legacy for Richard Rodgers, whose father Richard Rodgers Sr. was part of "The Play", a famous college football game that ended on a five-lateral play for a touchdown. Considered one of the best of the year, the pass won the NFL Play of the Year award for the 2015 season and was named the year's best play in North American sports at the 2016 ESPY Awards. In 2020, the play was ranked as one of the greatest moments in Wisconsin sports history by the Milwaukee Journal Sentinel.

== See also ==
- List of Hail Mary passes in American football
- List of nicknamed NFL games and plays
