= Field goal (basketball) =

Type of basket score in basketball

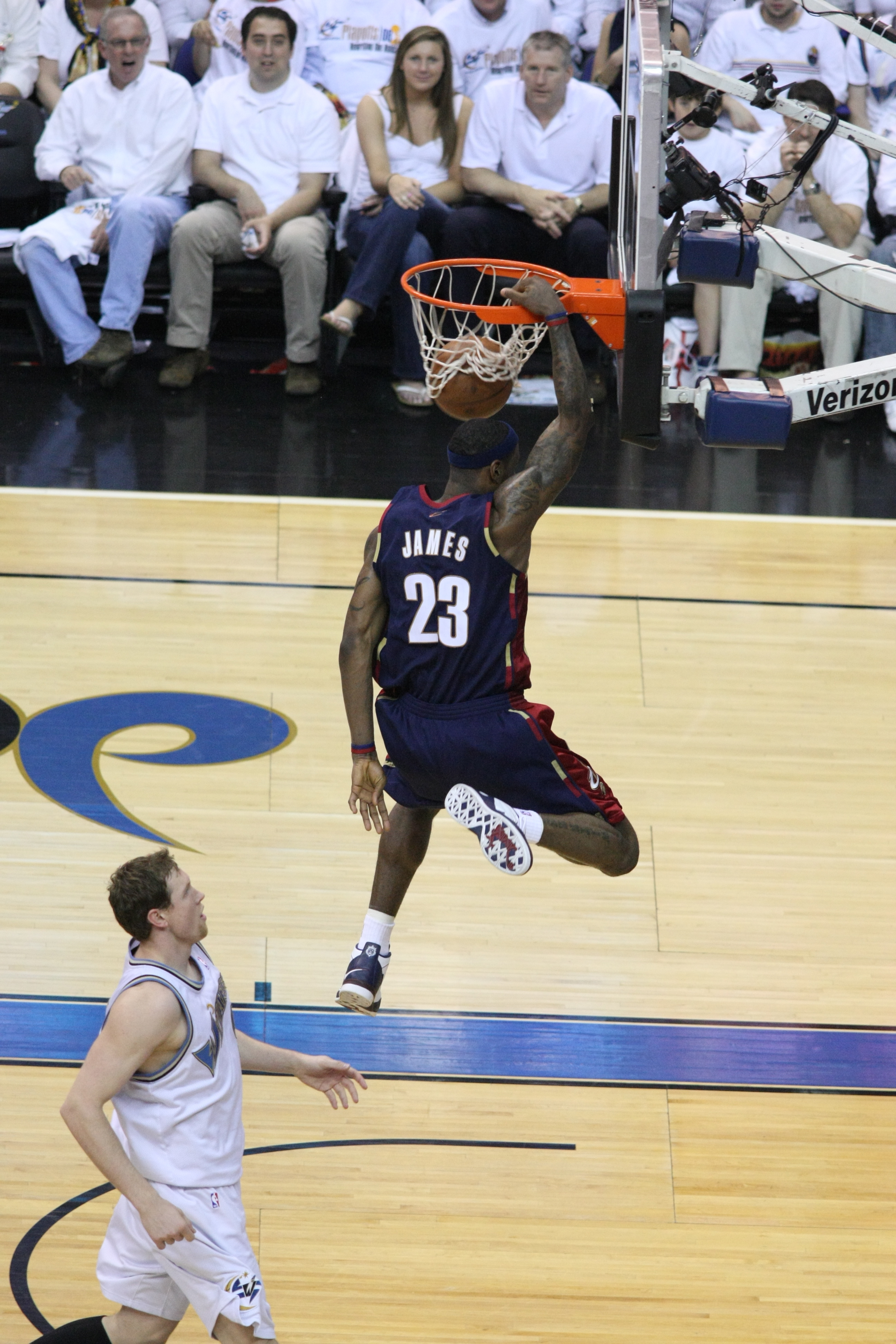
A two-point field goal scored at the basket by LeBron James

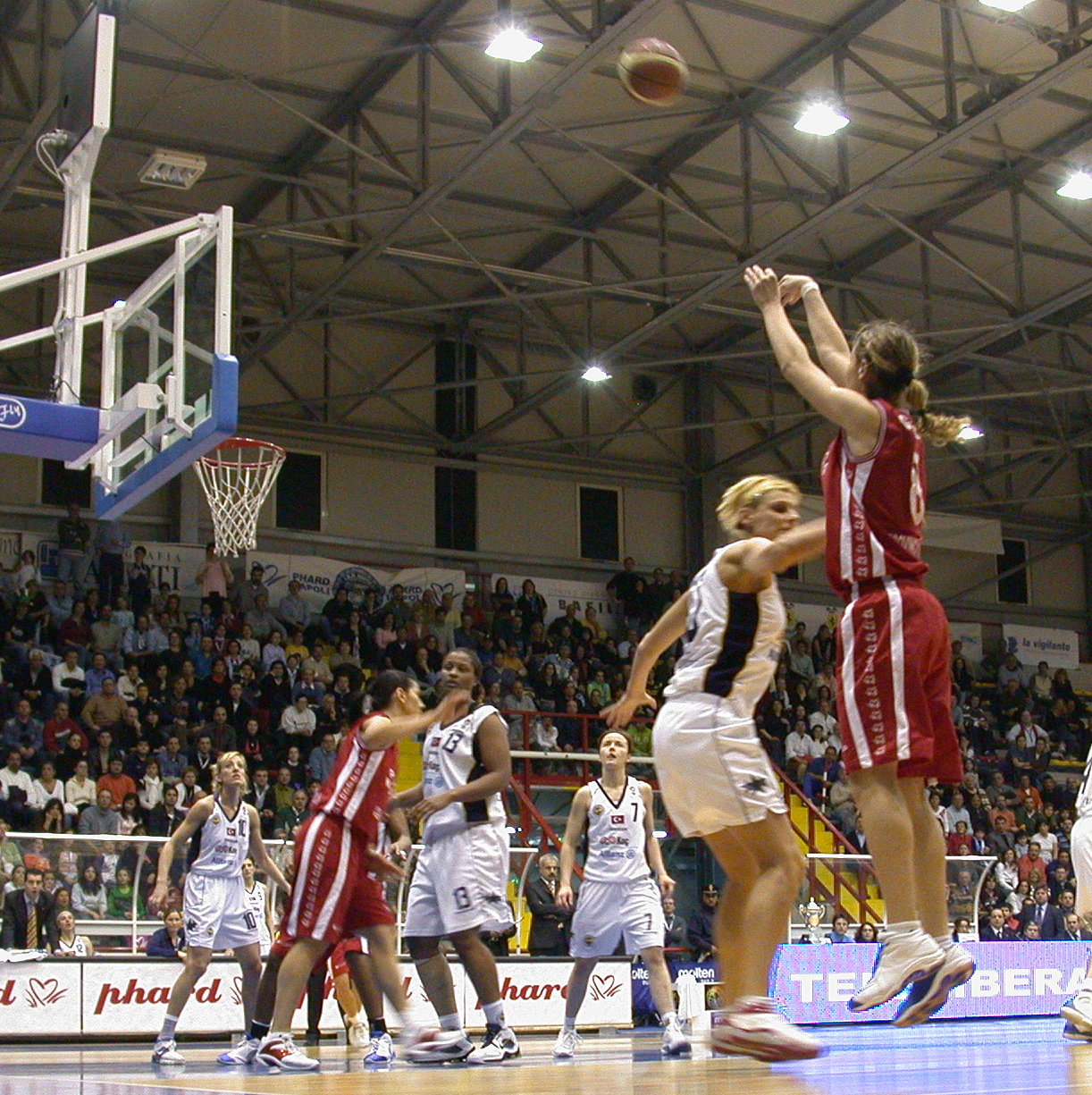
A shot from beyond the three-point line for a three-point field goal

In basketball, a field goal is a basket scored on any shot or tap other than a free throw, worth two or three points depending on the location of the attempt on the basket. Uncommonly, a field goal can be worth other values such as one point in FIBA 3x3 basketball competitions or four points in the BIG3 basketball league. "Field goal" is the official terminology for a made shot used by the National Basketball Association (NBA) in their rule book, in their box scores and statistics, and in referees' rulings. The same term is also the official wording used by the National Collegiate Athletic Association (NCAA) and high school basketball.

One type of field goal is called a slam dunk. This occurs when a player jumps near the basket with possession of the ball, throwing the ball down through the basket while airborne.

LeBron James holds the NBA record for field goals made in a career with 15,961 (as of April 15, 2026). Wilt Chamberlain, one of the most prolific scorers of all time, holds the top four spots for most field goals made in a season and has the second-highest field goal percentage for a season (72.7%). The highest field goal percentage for a single season was set by New York Knicks center Mitchell Robinson with 74.2% in the abbreviated 2019–20 season. One of the greatest field-goal shooters of all time is Michael Jordan, who led the NBA in field goals made ten times. Shaquille O'Neal has the record for most seasons (10) with the best field goal percentage, and DeAndre Jordan has the record for highest career field goal percentage (67.4%). Steve Nash holds the record for 50–40–90 seasons, a mark of all-around shooting for two-point field goals, three-point field goals, and free throws. Nash recorded four of the eleven 50–40–90 seasons in NBA history. Baron Davis holds the NBA record for the longest successful field goal with an 89-foot shot on February 17, 2001.

Diana Taurasi has the record for the greatest number of field goals in a WNBA season. In 2006, she attempted 660 field goals and achieved 298 of them having the Guinness World Record for both items. She played for the Phoenix Mercury team.

== See also ==
- NBA records
- Notable half-court shots

== Sources ==
- Oliver, Chris (2018-06-02). "Basketball Shot Selection and the Use of Questions". Basketball Immersion.
- Kopf, Dan (18 October 2017). "Data analytics have made the NBA unrecognizable". Quartz.
- Ross, Terrance F. (2015-06-25). "This Isn't Your Dad's NBA: Thank Big Data". The Atlantic.
