= Carl Cheffers =

American football official (born 1960)

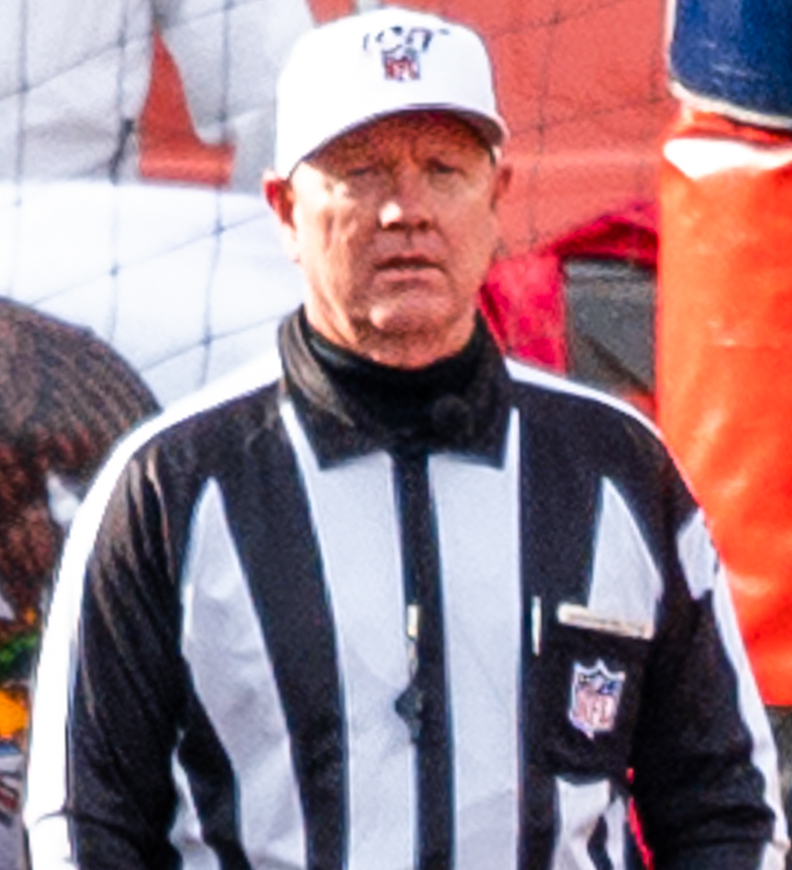
- Cheffers in 2019
- Born: July 22, 1960 (age 66); Whittier, California, U.S.
- Occupation: NFL official (2000–present)

Carl Cheffers (born July 22, 1960) is an American professional football official who officiates games for the National Football League (NFL). He has been an NFL official since the 2000 NFL season.

== Officiating career ==
As a college student, Cheffers became interested in officiating through his father, and decided to work intramural sports to make additional income. Enjoying the experience of student sports, he sought assistance from his father to officiate high school football games to begin a career. Starting in 1980, he worked several high school playoff games, and two high school championship games. By 1995, Cheffers began officiating in the Pac-10 where he worked for five seasons before being hired by the NFL. During this time, he also worked in the Western Athletic Conference.

Since entering the NFL, Cheffers has worked as a side judge, most recently on the crew headed by referee Larry Nemmers. Cheffers was promoted to referee (crew chief) beginning with the 2008 NFL season following the retirement of Nemmers and referee Gerald Austin.

In his promotion to referee, NFL officiating director Mike Pereira said of Cheffers, "Carl has been extremely successful on the field as a side judge. He is very knowledgeable of the rules, a good rules guy. Strong presence. He was part of Larry Nemmers' crew and he was clearly a crew leader. When we first saw Carl, we saw referee experience from him even though he had refereed basically at the small-college level."

In 2010, Cheffers refereed a game between the Dallas Cowboys and Houston Texans, during which there was a convoluted play on a Texans' kickoff return in the 4th quarter that resulted in multiple offsetting penalties. Cheffers struggled to clearly announce the outcome of the play and the penalties, resulting in a memorable and humorous moment for the announcers and fans.

Cheffers was selected to be the alternate referee of Super Bowl XLIX, which was played at University of Phoenix Stadium in Glendale, Arizona on February 1, 2015.

In December 2015, Cheffers refereed the game between the Detroit Lions and Green Bay Packers, which resulted in the "Miracle in Motown" play.

On February 5, 2017, Cheffers was the referee for Super Bowl LI in Houston, between the New England Patriots and the Atlanta Falcons, which was the first Super Bowl to be decided in an overtime period. New England won the game 34–28. Previously during that same postseason, he had refereed the game between the Pittsburgh Steelers and Kansas City Chiefs and was criticized by players for calling a holding penalty on Chiefs offensive tackle Eric Fisher during a crucial two-point conversion attempt, which resulted in the Steelers winning 18–16. Pereira supported the call.

Cheffers was the referee of Super Bowl LV, which was his second Super Bowl assignment as a referee. The eight penalties and 95 yards enforced against Kansas City, in the first half, were both NFL records for a Super Bowl. The first half penalties resulted in six first downs for the Tampa Bay Buccaneers which was also an NFL record. Cheffers was also selected as the referee for Super Bowl LVII, held on February 12, 2023.

=== 2024 Crew ===
- R: Carl Cheffers
- U: Brandon Cruse
- DJ: Mike Carr
- LJ: Robin DeLorenzo
- FJ: Eugene Hall
- SJ: Nate Jones
- BJ: Martin Hankins
- RO: Kirt Shay
- RA: Brian Davies

== Personal life ==
Cheffers and his wife have a son and a daughter. Cheffers's father also was a football official and worked in the Pacific-10 Conference (Pac-10).
