= List of longest NBA field goals =

The following list shows successful field goals by National Basketball Association (NBA) players during a regular season or playoff game, shot from a known distance of at least 70 feet (21 m) from the basket. These attempts are generally buzzer beaters when there is not enough time left on the clock to pass or dribble the ball further upcourt for a closer and easier shot attempt. Baron Davis holds the record for longest NBA field goal; on February 17, 2001, as a member of the Charlotte Hornets, he successfully made an 89-foot shot while visiting the Milwaukee Bucks at the Bradley Center.

Player	Distance	Date	Team	Opponent	Venue
Baron Davis	89 feet	February 17, 2001	Charlotte Hornets	Milwaukee Bucks	Bradley Center
Norm Van Lier	84 feet	January 19, 1977	Chicago Bulls	San Antonio Spurs	HemisFair Arena
Magic Johnson	84 feet	April 23, 1987 (playoffs)	Los Angeles Lakers	Denver Nuggets	The Forum
LeBron James	83 feet	January 3, 2007	Cleveland Cavaliers	Boston Celtics	TD Banknorth Garden
Herb Williams	81 feet	January 8, 1986	Indiana Pacers	Sacramento Kings	Market Square Arena
Ziaire Williams	79 feet	January 22, 2023	Memphis Grizzlies	Phoenix Suns	Footprint Center
John Bagley	78 feet	November 17, 1987	New Jersey Nets	Houston Rockets	Brendan Byrne Arena
Zoran Planinić	77 feet	November 9, 2005	New Jersey Nets	Utah Jazz	Continental Airlines Arena
Jonathan Kuminga	75 feet	March 18, 2026	Atlanta Hawks	Dallas Mavericks	American Airlines Center
Vince Carter	72 feet	February 19, 2016	Memphis Grizzlies	Minnesota Timberwolves	FedExForum
Darius Miller	72 feet	April 28, 2018 (playoffs)	New Orleans Pelicans	Golden State Warriors	Oracle Arena
Andre Drummond	71 feet	February 8, 2016	Detroit Pistons	Toronto Raptors	The Palace of Auburn Hills

== See also ==
- Half-court shot § Notable half-court shots
- List of Hail Mary passes in American football, shows some of the longest touchdowns in NFL history
