= Bluegrass Miracle =

- The sports page of the Baton Rouge Advocate on November 10, 2002, the day after the "Bluegrass Miracle." The top photo shows Kentucky defenders deflecting the pass, and the large center photo shows LSU wide receiver Devery Henderson right after catching the pass for the walk-off touchdown.
LSU Tigers	Kentucky Wildcats
(6–2)	(6–3)
33	30
Head coach: Nick Saban	Head coach: Guy Morriss
AP / Coaches; 16 / 14	AP / Coaches; NR / NR
	1	2	3	4	Total
LSU	0	14	7	12	33
Kentucky	7	0	7	16	30
- Date: November 9, 2002
- Season: 2002
- Stadium: Commonwealth Stadium
- Location: Lexington, Kentucky
- Referee: Steve Shaw

United States TV coverage
- Network: Jefferson Pilot Sports (regionally syndicated)
- Announcers: Dave Neal (play-by-play); Dave Archer (color analogy); Dave Baker (sideline reporter)

The Bluegrass Miracle was a 74-yard game-winning touchdown pass by the No. 16 LSU Tigers with no time left on the clock against the Kentucky Wildcats on November 9, 2002, at Commonwealth Stadium in Lexington, Kentucky. The ball was tipped by a Kentucky player before being caught at the 15-yard line by Devery Henderson of LSU, who ran it in for the walk-off touchdown.

== Background ==
Kentucky, the home team, was the underdog to the defending SEC champion Tigers. LSU was ahead by as many as 14 points at one point and led 24–14 after a field goal with 13:58 left in the fourth quarter, but Kentucky came back with a 13–3 run to tie it at 27. However, a Kentucky player called the Wildcats' last timeout on first down from the LSU 11 with 15 seconds left on the clock, and rather than risking a turnover or a tackle within the field of play that would leave the clock running and the Wildcats unable to line up to spike the football, head coach Guy Morriss opted to send kicker Taylor Begley out to kick a 29-yard field goal, giving the Wildcats a 30–27 lead with 11 seconds left on the clock. LSU got the ball back, but the ensuing kickoff pinned the team at its own 9-yard line. On the first play of the series, the Tigers quickly got the ball to their own 26-yard line on a pass from quarterback Marcus Randall to wide receiver Michael Clayton. An LSU timeout stopped the clock with 2 seconds left, and set up a desperation Hail Mary pass. The chances for success were considered slim because Randall's arm was not strong enough to reach the opponent's end zone from 70+ yards away. Kentucky players were so confident that they had won the game that they gave Morriss a Gatorade bath before the final play had taken place.

== The play ==
Randall, as time expires, lets it fly...OH, MY GOODNESS! TOUCHDOWN, LSU! They win the game! They win the football game!

— Dave Neal's call of the play on Jefferson Pilot Sports.

On the final play of the game, LSU called the play "Dash Right 93 Berlin". Tigers quarterback Marcus Randall took the ball and threw it from his own 18 yard line as far as he could downfield. Soon after Randall released the ball, triumphant Kentucky fans stormed the field around Randall. The pass was 25 yards short of the end zone. However, the ball was deflected off the hand of a Kentucky player between the Kentucky 30 and 25 yard lines and fell into the hands of LSU wide receiver Devery Henderson just short of the 15-yard line. Henderson broke an attempt at a shoestring tackle by the last Kentucky defender and ran into the end zone for the game-winning touchdown.

== Confusion and aftermath ==
While Henderson crossed the end zone, the Jefferson Pilot Sports television broadcast accidentally posted the graphic "Kentucky 30, LSU 27—FINAL." LSU had actually just won the game 33–30. After the touchdown, Jefferson Pilot Sports play-by-play announcer Dave Neal called the play, "The most shocking, improbable, unbelievable sequence of events." In his television interview right after the play, LSU head coach Nick Saban said, "I don't know what to say. I feel bad for Kentucky's players. But this is a big moment for us and I'm happy as heck for our team....Well, sometimes you gotta be a little lucky and I think that was our luck right there." Kentucky fans who were already on the field could not believe what had happened. Fireworks spewed out of the Commonwealth Stadium suites to herald the apparent Kentucky win when the game clock read "0:00", even prior to the Hail Mary pass. After the play, Tom Leach, Kentucky's radio play-by-play announcer, said, "How much heartbreak. (Kentucky) fans are up on the goal posts. I don't know why." LSU's play-by-play announcer Jim Hawthorne, was equally shocked and was also at a loss for an explanation; he initially said that LSU defensive back Jack Hunt (who had converted from wide receiver in 2002), not Devery Henderson, scored the touchdown. Hunt's uniform number was 8; Henderson's was 9.

== Naming the play ==
On the day after the game, Baton Rouge's daily newspaper, The Advocate, ran the headline "HAIL TIGERS" on the sports page. The headline is a reference to the Hail Mary pass used to win the game. On back of the sports page, it also provided a shot-by-shot camera sequence of the play. The page also included a graphic outlining the sequence of events. They were accompanied by the headline "Dash Right 93 Berlin," which was the play run that won the game.

The play became permanently known as the "Bluegrass Miracle" after a poll of LSU fans was conducted on the LSU Sports website days later. Other website suggestions for the name included "The Bluegrass Bomb" and "Miracle on the Bluegrass." The website also received write-in votes for such names as "The Divine Deflection," "It Works Devery Time," and "The Lexington Longshot."

== Awards and records ==
The "Bluegrass Miracle" also won the 2003 Best Play ESPY Award. It beat out plays from Kobe Bryant, LeBron James, Michael Vick and Barry Bonds. Devery Henderson accepted the award on behalf of the LSU team. It was the second time an LSU miracle play won an ESPY award: Warren Morris had won the 1997 Showstopper of the Year ESPY Award for his two-out, walk-off home run in the 1996 College World Series championship game.

It also marked the second time in as many years that LSU foiled a Kentucky football comeback in the final moments of the game. In the 2001 game, also at Kentucky, the Tigers won 29–25, on a touchdown pass from Marcus Randall to Michael Clayton with 13 seconds left in the game. Earlier in the game, Kentucky had overcome a 12-point halftime deficit to take the lead in the 4th quarter.
