= Miracle at Michigan =

Colorado Buffaloes	Michigan Wolverines
(2–0)	(2–0)
27	26
Head coach: Bill McCartney	Head coach: Gary Moeller
AP / Coaches; 7 / 7	AP / Coaches; 4 / 4
	1	2	3	4	Total
Colorado	7	7	0	13	27
Michigan	0	9	17	0	26
- Date: September 24, 1994
- Season: 1994
- Stadium: Michigan Stadium
- Location: Ann Arbor, Michigan
- Attendance: 106,427

United States TV coverage
- Network: ABC
- Announcers: Keith Jackson, Bob Griese

The Miracle at Michigan refers to the walk-off touchdown that occurred during the American football game played on September 24, 1994, between the Colorado Buffaloes and Michigan Wolverines at Michigan Stadium in Ann Arbor, Michigan. The game was decided on Colorado quarterback Kordell Stewart's 64-yard Hail Mary pass to Michael Westbrook, the second touchdown by the Buffaloes in the last 2:16. The game was described as one of the two wildest finishes in Michigan football history.

Colorado trailed Michigan 26–21 with six seconds left when Stewart heaved the ball more than 70 yards in the air into the end zone where Westbrook caught it off a deflection from Blake Anderson for the walk-off touchdown. The play, which was named "Rocket Left", was called by Bill McCartney, Colorado coach and former Michigan assistant coach. Westbrook, Anderson and Rae Carruth lined up wide left and James Kidd lined up wide right. The same play was called to end the first half, resulting in a Chuck Winters interception.
