= Richard Rodgers (tight end) =

American football player (born 1992)

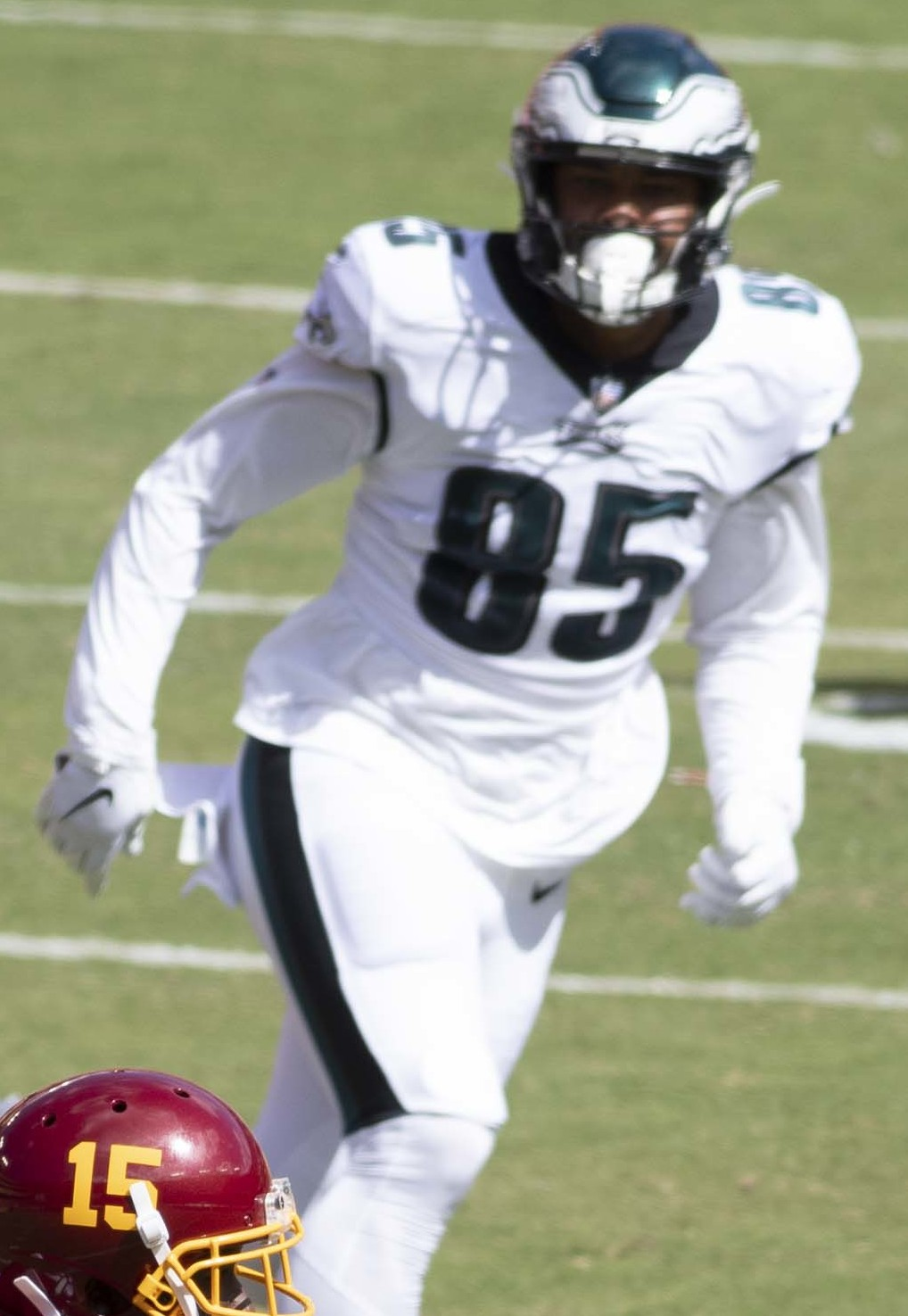
- Rodgers with the Philadelphia Eagles in 2020

No. 89, 82, 85, 81
- Position: Tight end

Personal information
- Born: January 22, 1992 (age 34); Martinez, California, U.S.
- Listed height: 6 ft 4 in (1.93 m)
- Listed weight: 257 lb (117 kg)

Career information
- High school: Saint John's (Shrewsbury, Massachusetts)
- College: California (2011–2013)
- NFL draft: 2014: 3rd round, 98th overall pick

Career history
- Green Bay Packers (2014–2017); Philadelphia Eagles (2018–2019); Washington Football Team (2020)*; Philadelphia Eagles (2020–2021); Arizona Cardinals (2021)*; Philadelphia Eagles (2021); Los Angeles Chargers (2022)
- * Offseason or practice squad member only

Career NFL statistics
- Receptions: 148
- Receiving yards: 1,533
- Receiving touchdowns: 15
- Stats at Pro Football Reference

Richard Christopher Rodgers II (born January 22, 1992) is an American former professional football player who was a tight end in the National Football League (NFL). He played college football for the California Golden Bears and was selected by the Green Bay Packers in the third round of the 2014 NFL draft. Rodgers was also a member of the Philadelphia Eagles, Washington Football Team, Arizona Cardinals, and Los Angeles Chargers.

== Early life ==
Rodgers was born in California, growing up there and Oregon and New Mexico before moving to Worcester, Massachusetts in 2004. He attended St. John's High School in Shrewsbury. At St. John's, Rodgers was a four-time letterman in basketball and three-time letterman in football for the Pioneers. While on the basketball team, he led the Pioneers to the state championship game all four years, including a win in 2009. As a senior, Rodgers averaged 17.8 points, 10.8 rebounds, 4.5 blocks, 4.1 steals and 3.4 assists playing basketball. He was named to the starting five on ESPNBoston's MIAA All-State Boys Basketball Team along with other talented players from Massachusetts such as seniors Pat Connaughton and Jake Layman as well. Rodgers is one of 14 athletes in St. John's history to be a member of the 1000 Point Scorers List, with 1,423 points. In football, he helped lead the Pioneers to central Massachusetts super bowl championship wins his last two years. Former Pittsburgh Steelers tight end Rob Blanchflower was also a teammate of Rodgers in football and basketball at St. John's.

Prior to the start of his senior year, Rodgers committed to attend the University of California, Berkeley, where his father, Richard Rodgers Sr., who also played football, handled two of the five laterals in "The Play".

Rodgers and Jairus Byrd are cousins.

== College career ==
Rodgers played in 35 of 37 possible games (starting 11) for the California Golden Bears during three seasons from 2011 to 2013. He had 20 receptions for 288 yards as a sophomore in 2012. Rodgers had his best season as a junior the following year, when he totaled career highs of 39 receptions and 608 yards receiving to rank third on the team in both categories. He finished his collegiate career with 59 receptions for 896 yards and two touchdowns.

== Professional career ==
External videos
- Rodgers' NFL Combine workout

Pre-draft measurables
Height	Weight	Arm length	Hand span	Wingspan	40-yard dash	10-yard split	20-yard split	20-yard shuttle	Three-cone drill	Vertical jump	Broad jump	Bench press	Wonderlic
6 ft 4 in (1.93 m)	257 lb (117 kg)	32 5/8 in (0.83 m)	10 1/8 in (0.26 m)	6 ft 8 in (2.03 m)	4.82 s	1.78 s	2.87 s	4.47 s	7.23 s	31.5 in (0.80 m)	9 ft 8 in (2.95 m)	16 reps	22
All values are from NFL Combine/Pro Day

=== Green Bay Packers ===
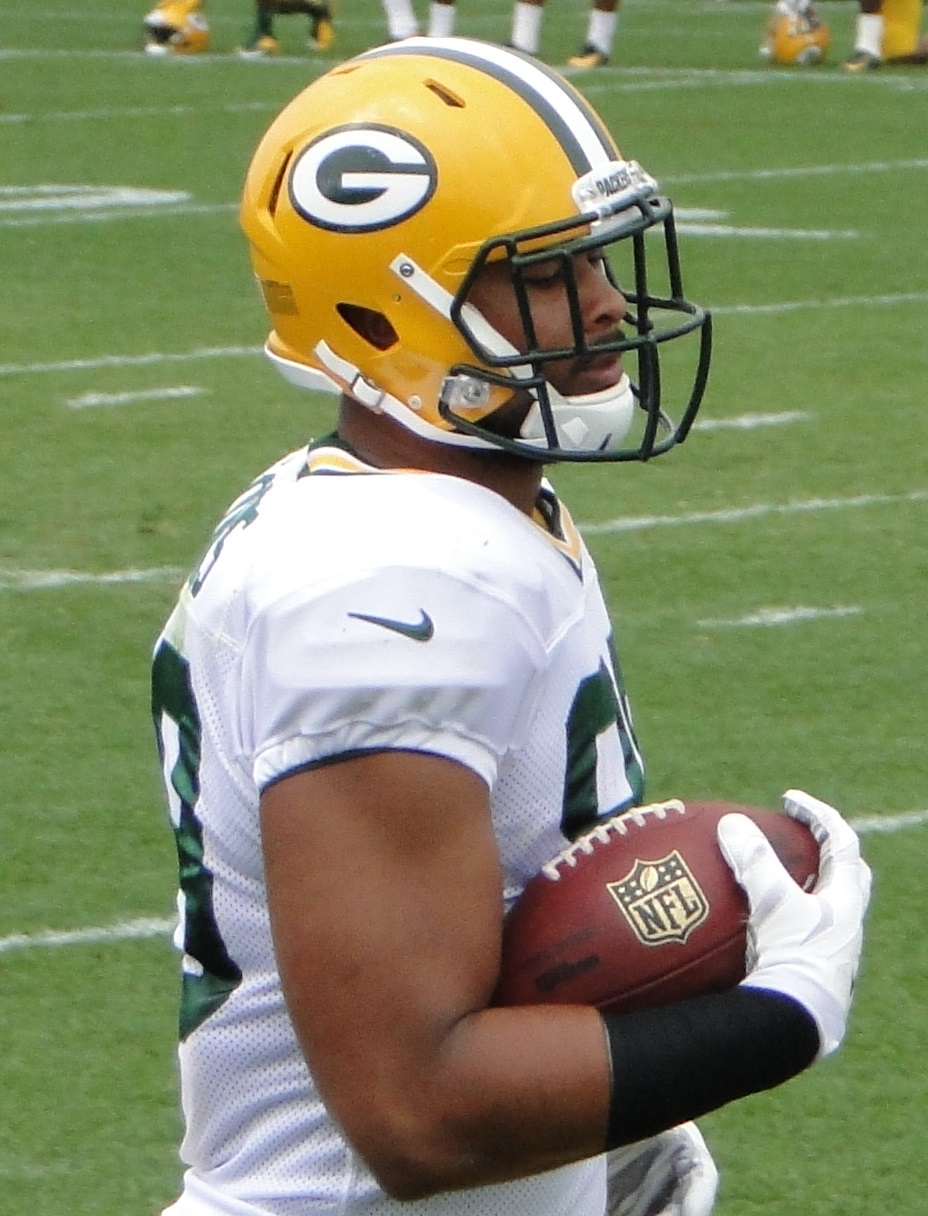
Rodgers during training camp in 2014

Rodgers was selected in the third round (98th overall) by the Green Bay Packers in the 2014 NFL draft. On June 12, 2014, he signed his rookie contract.

Rodgers made his NFL debut on September 4, but did not record a catch. In Week 4, Rodgers recorded his first two catches for 52 yards against the Chicago Bears. Rodgers' first NFL touchdown came in the second quarter of the Packers' Week 12 matchup against the Minnesota Vikings at TCF Bank Stadium. After rolling out far to his right, quarterback Aaron Rodgers completed a one-yard touchdown pass across the width of the field to Richard Rodgers, who had completely avoided defensive coverage and was left standing alone in the corner of the endzone.

On December 3, 2015, in a Week 13 matchup against the Detroit Lions, Rodgers caught a Hail Mary pass from Aaron Rodgers for 61 yards as time expired to beat the Lions 27–23, after the game was extended due to a face mask penalty called on Detroit. According to Elias Sports Bureau, it is the longest game-winning, game-ending Hail Mary in NFL history. The Hail Mary was quickly dubbed as "The Miracle in Motown." After the game Richard Rodgers admitted thinking about "The Play" of which his father was a participant, stating: "It's a really special moment for him and I was kind of thinking on the play before, when Aaron got the facemask, I was kind of thinking we would do something like that. Obviously it turned out differently."

=== Philadelphia Eagles (first stint) ===
On April 4, 2018, the Philadelphia Eagles signed Rodgers to a one-year, $880,000 contract that included $200,000 guaranteed. On September 4, he was placed on injured reserve on with a knee injury. Rodgers was activated off injured reserve on November 16. His only statistics were during Week 16 against the Houston Texans, where he recorded one catch for seven yards.

On March 28, 2019, Rodgers re-signed with the Eagles on a two-year contract. He was placed on injured reserve with a foot injury on August 30. Rodgers was released from injured reserve with an injury settlement on September 11. He was re-signed on December 24.

=== Washington Football Team ===
Rodgers signed with the Washington Football Team on April 6, 2020, uniting him with his father, Richard Rodgers Sr. Rodgers was released on September 5.

=== Philadelphia Eagles (second stint) ===
On September 8, 2020, Rodgers signed back with the Eagles after an injury to Joshua Perkins. After stepping in for an injured Dallas Goedert, Rodgers became the starting tight end on Week 7 following an injury to Zach Ertz. During Week 11 against the Cleveland Browns, Rodgers caught two passes for 48 yards and his first touchdown since 2017. In the next game against the Seattle Seahawks, Rodgers caught a 33-yard Hail Mary pass from Carson Wentz in the last minute of the fourth quarter.

On June 11, 2021, Rodgers re-signed with the Eagles for the 2021 season. He was waived on August 31. Rodgers was re-signed to the practice squad on September 21, but was released a week later.

=== Arizona Cardinals ===
Rodgers was signed to the Arizona Cardinals practice squad on October 13, 2021. He was released three days later.

=== Philadelphia Eagles (third stint) ===
Rodgers was signed to the Eagles' practice squad on October 20, 2021. He was signed to the active roster on January 15, 2022. Rodgers was placed on the active/physically unable to perform list on July 27, 2022. He was released on August 30.

=== Los Angeles Chargers ===
Rodgers was signed by the Los Angeles Chargers to their practice squad on September 5, 2022. He was promoted to the active roster on September 28. Rodgers was placed on injured reserve on December 10.

== Career statistics ==
=== NFL ===
==== Regular season ====
Year	Team	Games		Receiving					Fumbles	
Year	Team	GP	GS	Rec	Yds	Avg	Lng	TD	Fum	Lost
2014	GB	16	5	20	225	11.3	43	2	0	0
2015	GB	16	12	58	510	8.8	61	8	0	0
2016	GB	16	6	30	271	9.0	22	2	0	0
2017	GB	15	1	12	160	13.3	36	1	0	0
2018	PHI	7	0	1	7	7.0	7	0	0	0
2019	PHI	1	0	0	0	0.0	0	0	0	0
2020	PHI	14	4	24	345	14.4	33	2	0	0
Total		85	28	145	1,518	10.5	61	15	0	0
Source: NFL.com

==== Postseason ====
Year	Team	Games		Receiving					Fumbles	
Year	Team	GP	GS	Rec	Yds	Avg	Lng	TD	Fum	Lost
2014	GB	2	0	5	48	9.6	13	1	0	0
2015	GB	2	2	7	56	8.0	15	0	0	0
2016	GB	3	0	1	34	34.0	34	1	0	0
2018	PHI	2	0	0	0	0.0	0	0	0	0
2019	PHI	1	0	0	0	0.0	0	0	0	0
Total		10	2	13	138	10.6	34	2	0	0
Source: NFL.com

=== College ===
Year	Team	Games		Receiving				
Year	Team	GP	GS	Rec	Yds	Avg	Lng	TD
2011	California	13	0	0	0	0.0	0	0
2012	California	11	6	20	288	14.4	51	1
2013	California	11	5	39	608	15.6	75	1
Total		35	11	59	896	15.2	75	2
Source: CalBears.com
