= Two-point conversion =

Play in American and Canadian football

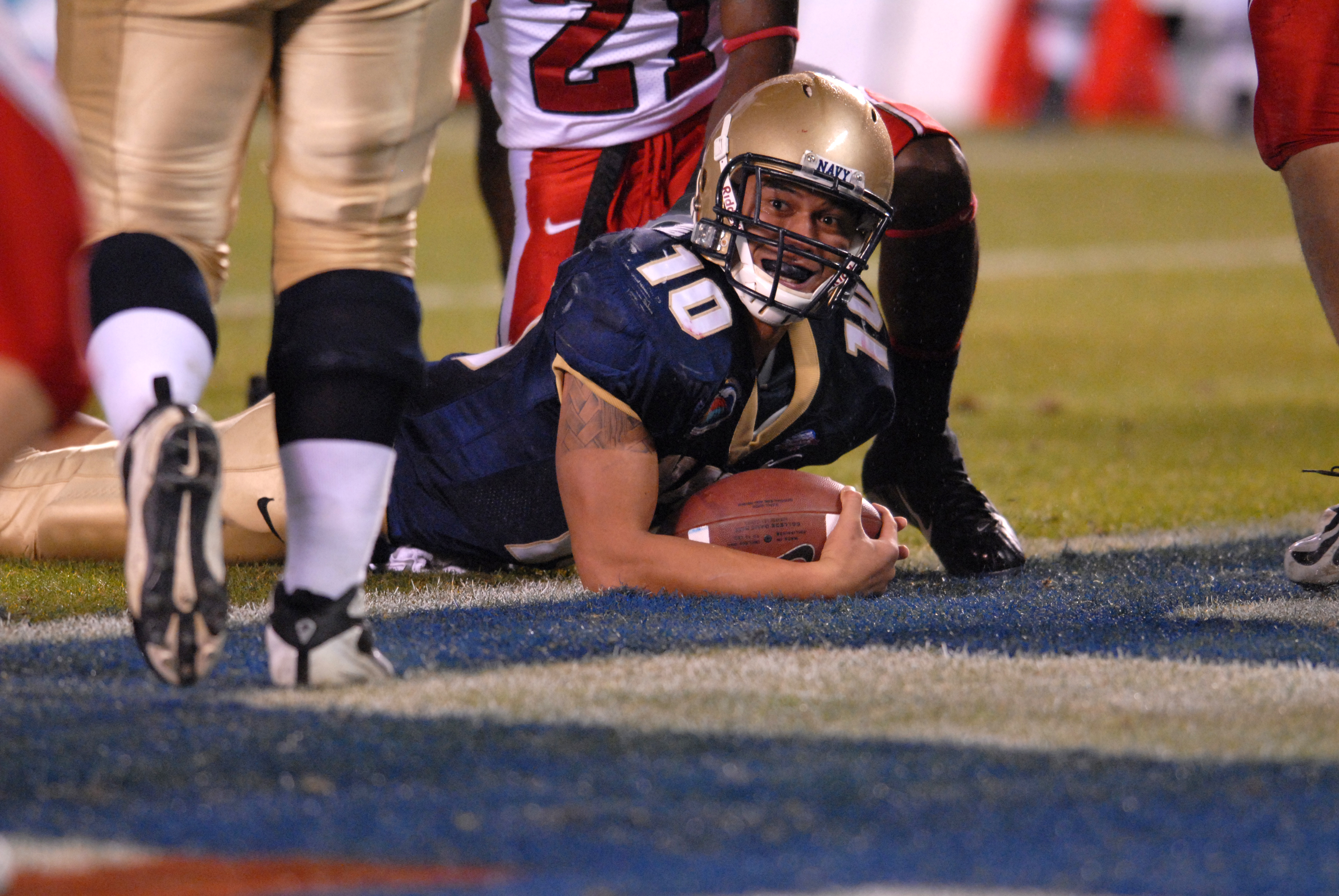
Navy quarterback Kaipo-Noa Kaheaku-Enhada puts the ball over the goal line for a two-point conversion at the 2007 Poinsettia Bowl

In gridiron football, a two-point conversion, two-point convert, two-point try, or two-point attempt is a play a team attempts instead of kicking a one-point conversion immediately after it scores a touchdown. In a two-point conversion attempt, the team that just scored must run a play from scrimmage close to the opponent's goal line and advance the ball across the goal line in the same manner as if it were scoring a touchdown. If the team succeeds, it earns two points in addition to the six points for the touchdown, for a total of eight points. If the team fails, no additional points are earned.

Conversion attempts are untimed plays in American football, and in the Canadian game they are untimed in the final three minutes of each half. If any time remains in the half, the team that scored the touchdown proceeds to a kickoff after their conversion attempt.

To attempt the two-point conversion, the team that just scored runs a scrimmage from the 5-yard line in amateur Canadian football, 3-yard line in professional Canadian football, 3-yard line in amateur American football, or 2-yard line in professional American football. In professional American football, there is a small dash to denote the line of scrimmage for a two-point conversion; it was also, until 2014, the line of scrimmage for a point-after kick ("extra point").

Various sources estimate the success rate of a two-point conversion to be between 40% and 55%, significantly lower than that of the one-point conversion (which has a 90% to 95% success rate in the NFL).

Teams most often attempt a two-point conversion when two points are significantly more valuable than one, such as when they are losing by two points late in the game.

A defensive two-point conversion occurs when, during an extra point attempt, the defense gains possession of the ball and returns it to the other end zone.

== Adoption of rule ==
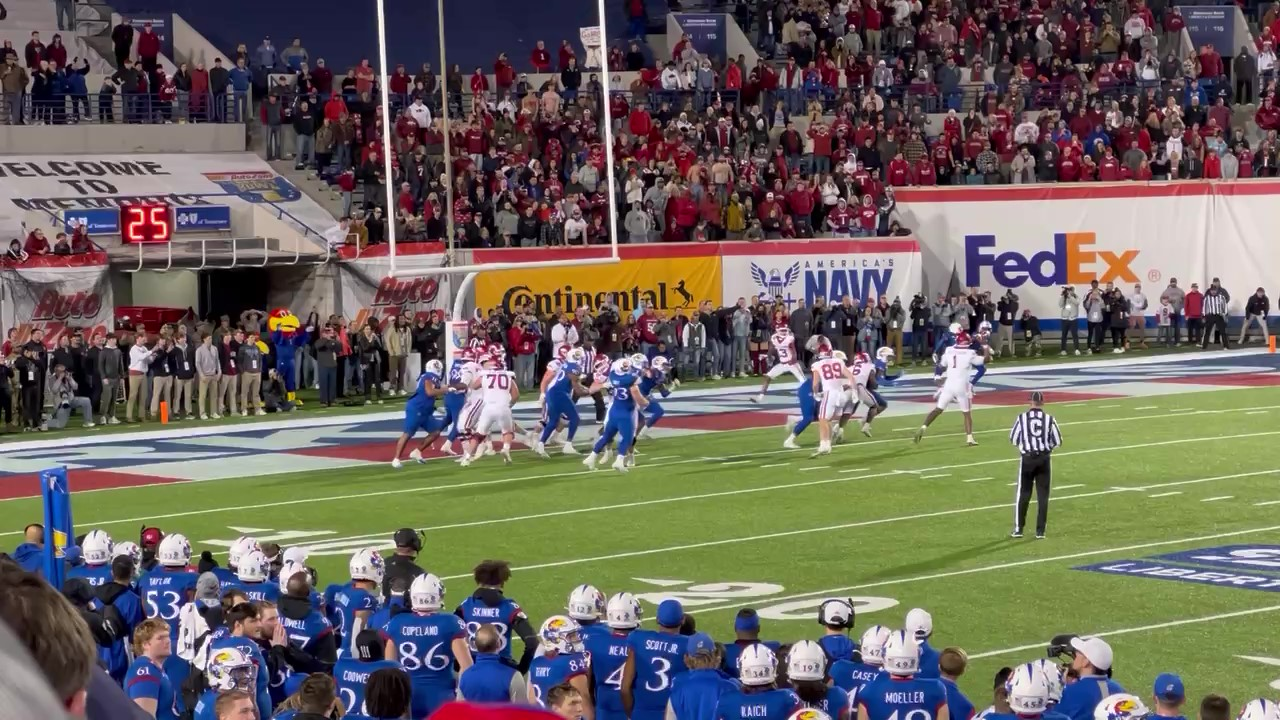
The Arkansas Razorbacks (in white) attempting a two-point conversion, via forward pass, in the 2022 Liberty Bowl

=== College football ===
College football has allowed for a conversion kick since the beginnings of the game (c. 1883), although it was originally worth multiple points.

Since 1898, one point has been the value for a conversion kick ("extra point") in college football, and starting in 1922, a conversion could be accomplished in any one of three ways—"By a goal from infield [kick]; by completing a forward pass in the end zone, or by carrying the ball across the line."—each worth a single point.

The two-point conversion rule was instituted in college football in 1958, in response to an overall decrease in scoring. Per current overtime rules in college football, two-point attempts are mandatory starting with double overtime.

=== Major professional leagues ===
The American Football League (AFL) used the two-point conversion during its ten-season existence from 1960 to 1969. After the AFL–NFL merger, the rule did not immediately carry over to the merged league, though they experimented in 1968 with a compromise rule (see Variants below).

Two-point conversions were adopted in Canadian amateur football and the Canadian Football League (CFL) in 1975. Per current CFL rules, they are mandatory at any point in overtime.

The original United States Football League adopted the two-point conversion rule for its entire existence from 1983 to 1985.

The National Football League (NFL) adopted the two-point conversion rule in 1994, 25 years after the merger. Tom Tupa scored the first two-point conversion in NFL history, running in a faked one-point attempt for the Cleveland Browns in a game against the Cincinnati Bengals in the first week of the 1994 season. He scored a total of three such conversions that season, earning him the nickname "Two-Point Tupa". That same season, the first two-point conversion in Super Bowl history came during Super Bowl XXIX when Mark Seay of the San Diego Chargers caught a pass thrown by Stan Humphries.

=== Other leagues ===
The NFL's developmental league, NFL Europe (and its former entity, the World League of American Football), adopted the two-point conversion rule for its entire existence from 1991 through 2007.

The Arena Football League (AFL) has recognized the two-point conversion for its entire existence (in both its original 1987–2008 incarnation and its 2010–2019 revival), allowing for either a play from scrimmage or a drop kick to be worth two points. A drop kick conversion being worth two points is unique to arena football.

In the Alliance of American Football (AAF) (which played part of only one season, 2019), two-point conversion attempts were mandatory after touchdowns.

Six-man football reverses the extra point and the two-point conversion: because there is no offensive line in that game variant, making kick protection more difficult, plays from scrimmage are worth one point but successful kicks are worth two. It is also reversed in many high school football and youth football leagues, since there are not often skilled kickers at that level. A variant of this, especially at the youth level, is to allow one point for a running conversion, two points for a passing conversion, and two points for a successful kick.

=== Variants ===
In 1968, leading up to the AFL–NFL merger, the leagues developed a radical "compromise" rule that reconciled the fact that the NFL did not use the two-point conversion but the AFL did: the relatively easy one-point kick would be eliminated and only a play from scrimmage could score one point called a "pressure point". The rule was used for the interleague matchups for that preseason, and was not tried again.

Both the World Football League and the original XFL revived this concept, making it a point not to institute a two-point conversion rule so as to eliminate the easy kick. What would constitute a two-point conversion in other leagues counted only one point in the AFL–NFL games, WFL, or the first XFL. The WFL called it the "action point", used after touchdowns, which the WFL counted as seven points. However, the first XFL later added a rule in the playoffs that allowed the scoring team to score two (or even three) points by successfully executing a play from a point farther from the opponent's end zone (two points if the team could score from the five-yard line and three points if they could score from the ten-yard line). This rule was revived along with the XFL in 2020 and has been carried over to the United Football League.

Champions Indoor Football and the 2024 incarnation of the Arena Football League expanded upon the rule by offering a four-point conversion in addition to two-point and three-point options. The rule was eventually removed from the Arena Football One rules.

=== Extra point adjustment ===
During the summer of 2014, the conversion by place kick was reviewed by the NFL. The proposed format would have awarded seven points for a touchdown without an extra-point attempt, eight points with a successful conversion by running or passing, and six points with an unsuccessful attempt. This new format was proposed because of the almost certain probability of making a conversion by place kick (1,260 out of 1,265 for the 2013 season).

This proposal was never considered at the league owners' meeting in the spring of 2014. Instead, the league used the first two weeks of its preseason for an experiment that moved one-point kick attempts back to the 20-yard line, while two-point conversions remained at the 2-yard line. The league adopted a slightly modified version of this rule starting with the 2015 season, with the line of scrimmage for one-point kick attempts at the 15-yard line instead of the 20. That same year, the CFL also moved back its line of scrimmage for one-point converts to the 25-yard line (while moving the scrimmage line for a two-point convert ahead two yards to the 3-yard line), thus making the length for a one-point attempt the same in both the NFL and CFL (taking into account the NFL's goalposts on the end line, and the CFL's on the goal line).

In college football, the placement of the football remains the same for conversion attempts by any method.

== Defensive two-point conversion ==
A defensive two-point conversion, also called a two-point return, occurs when, during an offensive after-touchdown extra point attempt, the defense gains possession of the ball and returns it to the other end zone, scoring two points for the defensive team. The team that scored the touchdown then kicks off as normal. The defensive two-point conversion is recognized in American college, professional, and Canadian football (as well as, for a significant period of time, the Arena Football League, where missed extra points were rebounded back into the field of play).

This is rare because of the infrequent use of the two-point conversion and the rarity of blocked conversion kicks, combined with the difficulty of returning the ball the full length of the field. It has proven the winning margin in some games, the first such college game occurring September 10, 1988, when St. John's defeated Iona College, 26–24. Only once has a player scored two defensive two-point conversions in a game: Tony Holmes of the Texas Longhorns in a 1998 game against the Iowa State Cyclones on October 3.

The NFL originally had no provision for defensive two-point conversions, and its rules used to state that a conversion was automatically blown dead and ruled as "no good" as soon as the defense gained possession of the ball. On May 19, 2015, the NFL owners adopted a proposal to permit a defensive two-point conversion for the 2015 season. On May 20, 2016, the owners adopted a further proposal called the two-point fair-play rule: this prevents the defense from getting a turnover during a two-point conversion and then intentionally committing a foul to increase their chance at a two-point return. If the defense gains a turnover and then commits a foul, the offense has the option to accept the penalty and attempt the try again. It has not yet been enforced in the NFL, but a similar rule has been enforced on two occasions in the CFL.

Stephone Anthony of the New Orleans Saints became the first NFL player to score a defensive two-point conversion, returning a blocked extra-point kick from Graham Gano of the Carolina Panthers on December 6, 2015. On November 14, 2016, the first game decided by a defensive two-point conversion occurred as Justin Simmons returned a blocked PAT for two points with 1:28 remaining to give the Denver Broncos a 25-23 lead over the New Orleans Saints; the Broncos recovered the subsequent onside kick to seal the win. On December 4, 2016, Eric Berry of the Kansas City Chiefs became the first NFL player to return an interception for a defensive two-point conversion, which was thrown by quarterback Matt Ryan of the Atlanta Falcons. On January 11, 2025, during a Wild Card game between the Texans and Chargers, the Chargers, down 23–6, got 6 more points on the board from Ladd McConkey scoring an 86-yard touchdown to cut Houston's lead to 23–12. However, the Texans blocked the extra point attempt by Chargers kicker Cameron Dicker, and D'Angelo Ross scooped up the ball and ran it all the way back for a defensive two-point conversion, the first one ever in an NFL playoff game.

The NCAA has allowed defensive two-point conversions in college football since the 1988 season. In that first season, there were 20 defensive conversions scored among all NCAA divisions, with two in Division I-A. The first defensive conversion in NCAA Division I-A was scored by Bill Stone of Rice University in a 54–11 loss to Notre Dame on November 5, 1988. (Note: There was a defensive conversion scored in a Division I-A junior varsity (JV) game by Air Force JV in a 27-21 loss to the BYU JV on September 24, 1988. BYU JV surrendered another defensive conversion on October 14, 1988.) The first college player to score a defensive two-point conversion was Rod Beauchamp of Colorado School of Mines on September 3, 1988, in a 36–2 loss to Hastings College, after the Hastings center snapped the ball over the holder's head; even though the rule states the ball cannot be advanced when it hits the ground in this manner, the score stands once the referee declares the game over.

The first defensive conversion following a blocked extra-point kick was scored by Springfield College in a 40–33 win over WPI on September 9, 1988.

High schools that follow the rules of the National Federation of State High School Associations (all U.S. high schools except those in Texas, which uses NCAA rules instead) do not allow defensive runbacks of recovered conversion attempts, and any recovery of the ball by the defense during the try is immediately blown dead and ruled as "no good."

== Conversion safety ==
Rules in high school, college and professional football dictate that when a safety occurs during a two-point conversion or point-after kick (officially known in the rulebooks as a try), it is worth one point. It can be scored by the offense in college and professional football (following an NFL rule change in 2015) if the defense obtains possession of a live ball in the field of play, propels the ball into its own end zone, and the ball is then downed there with the defense in possession. This event has only occurred four times in NCAA Division I history. Before 2015, the only scenario in which the offense could have scored a one-point safety in the NFL would have involved, on a conversion attempt in which the ball was not kicked by the offense, the defense kicking or batting a loose ball out the back of the end zone without taking possession of it.

A conversion safety can be earned by the defense if the offense retreats with the ball all the way back into its own end zone. Two potential scenarios include (1) an errant snap or a fumble that is bobbled repeatedly until the offensive team recovers the ball in, or bats the ball through, its own end zone (similar situations have been documented in regular play from scrimmage and are more likely in arena football with its much shorter, narrower and bounded field of play), and (2) a defender attempting a defensive two-point conversion and fumbling the ball, with the offensive team recovering and establishing possession outside the end zone, then downing the ball in its own end zone. Although such a conversion safety has never been scored by the defense, this rule provides the only way in American professional football that a team could finish the game with a score of one point. (Canadian football allows another one-point play called the single or rouge). Following a 2021 rule change in college football, triple overtime and thereafter involves teams attempting two-point conversions rather than running plays from the 25-yard line. The rules regarding safeties on these plays are the same as for any other conversion attempt, opening up additional ways for a team to finish the game with exactly one point (though in this scenario, a game would have to remain scoreless through double overtime to achieve this).

The high school football rulebook acknowledges the conversion safety, awarding one point for it, but also immediately ends a play if the opposing team gains possession of the ball, a rule similar to the one the NFL used before 2015. Thus, any situation that requires the defense to gain possession of the ball cannot result in a conversion safety in games where that rulebook is used.

== Choice of one- or two-point attempt ==
The coaches' choice of whether to attempt a one- or two-point conversion depends on the game's current score, the amount of time remaining, and their assessment of their team's chance of success.

Analysis of historical data finds that the two-point conversion is successful about half the time, whereas one-point kicks are almost always successful. Therefore, the expected value of both options is roughly similar, with the critical factor being whether the chance of a successful two-point conversion is more or less than half that of a successful kick. However, the mathematics regarding maximizing a team's chances of winning are more complicated. For example, late in a game, a team that is one point up after a touchdown would gain little benefit from a one-point attempt, because regardless of success, the team would still lose if the opposition later scored a field goal. In such a situation, the two-point conversion would be the better option. If successful, an opposition field goal would then only tie the game.

A more complicated scenario is when a team is trailing by 14 points. The team could choose to go for two, because, if successful, the team could then kick an extra point following the next score to secure a win. On the other hand, if the two-point conversion fails, the team still has a chance to succeed on the next two-point conversion to get to fourteen. Mathematically, therefore, the minimum probability of converting a two-point try either on the first attempt (securing a win) or the second (securing a tie in regulation time) must be higher than the maximum probability of missing both (securing a loss). This occurs when the probability of missing both is 0.618 × 0.618, or 38.2%. As long as the probability of converting any individual two-point attempt is higher than 38.2% percent, it is optimal to adopt this strategy. Notably, Texas Longhorns coach Darrell Royal successfully used this strategy to defeat Arkansas in 1969's Game of the Century.

An analysis can be done for all situations, resulting in a table that can be consulted when a decision is needed. A chart made by UCLA offensive coordinator Dick Vermeil in the early 1970s is one of the most well-known.

In practice, two-point conversion attempts are rare, being done only after less than 1-in-10 touchdowns in the NFL. This proportion rose after the one-point kick was moved back to the 15-yard line (see Extra point adjustment above), which increased the difficulty and decreased the success rate of scoring the extra point.
