= Buzzer beater =

Basketball shot taken just before a clock expires

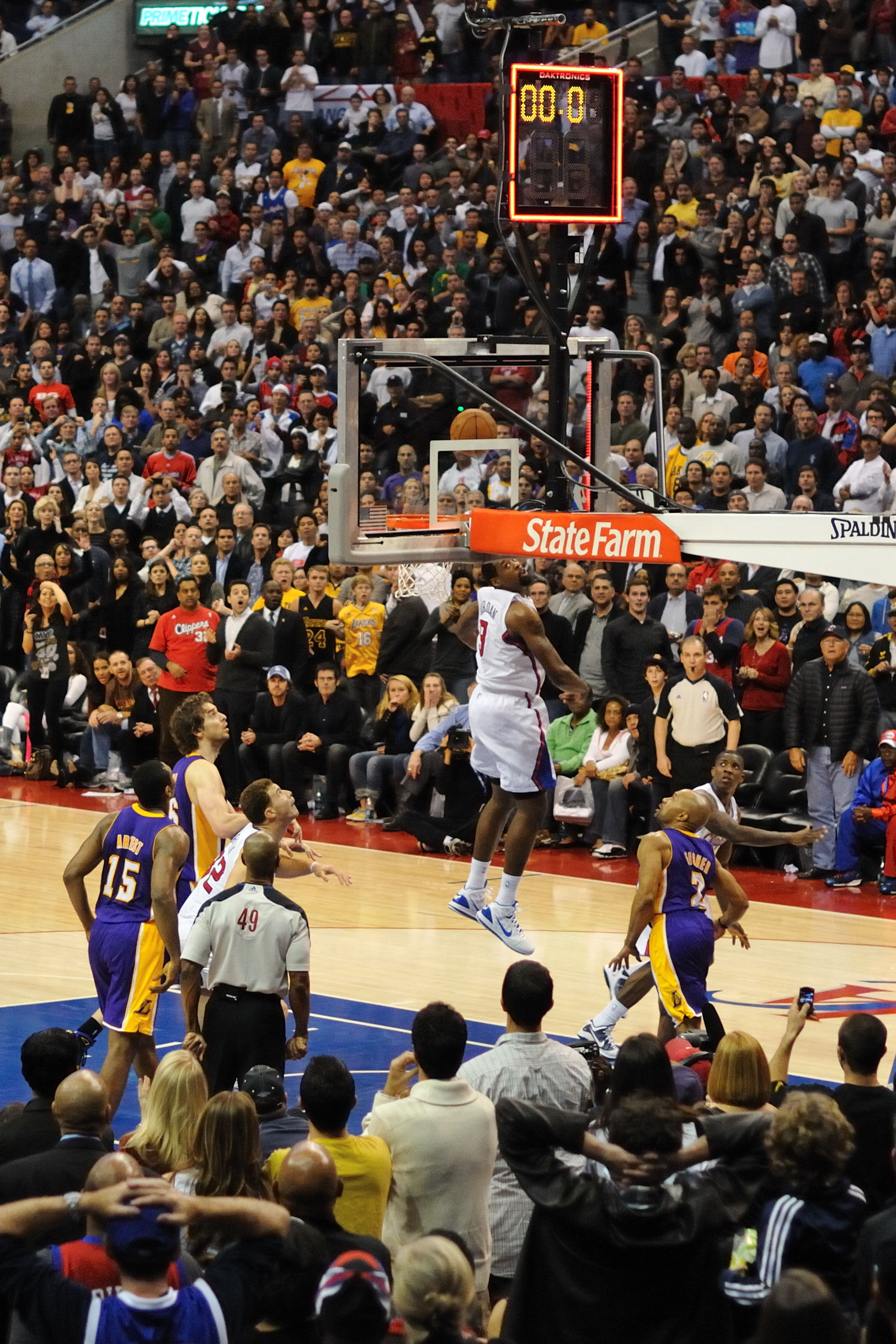
Derek Fisher shoots a game winning buzzer beater against the Los Angeles Clippers in 2010.

In timed sports, a buzzer beater is a successful shot made as the clock expires at the end of a period or at the end of the game, leaving zero seconds remaining. A buzzer sounds whenever a game clock expires, hence the name "buzzer beater." In basketball, the concept normally applies to baskets made at the end of a quarter, the second half, or overtime. A buzzer beater only counts if it leaves the player's fingers before the shot clock runs out. If the ball remains in the player's hands, then the shot violates the Trent Tucker Rule and does not count. The term is most commonly applied to shots that win or tie the game as the game clock expires.

Officials in the National Collegiate Athletic Association (NCAA), National Basketball Association (NBA), Women's National Basketball Association (WNBA), Serie A (Italy), and the EuroLeague Final Four series (effective 2006) are required to use instant replay to verify whether a shot that is made at the end of a period was released before the game clock expired. Since 2002, the NBA has also mandated the use of LED light strips along the edges of the backboard and the edge of the scorer's table to identify the end of a period.

== Notable examples ==
Although buzzer beaters are fairly common, several instances have been recognized as special occasions:

=== NCAA ===
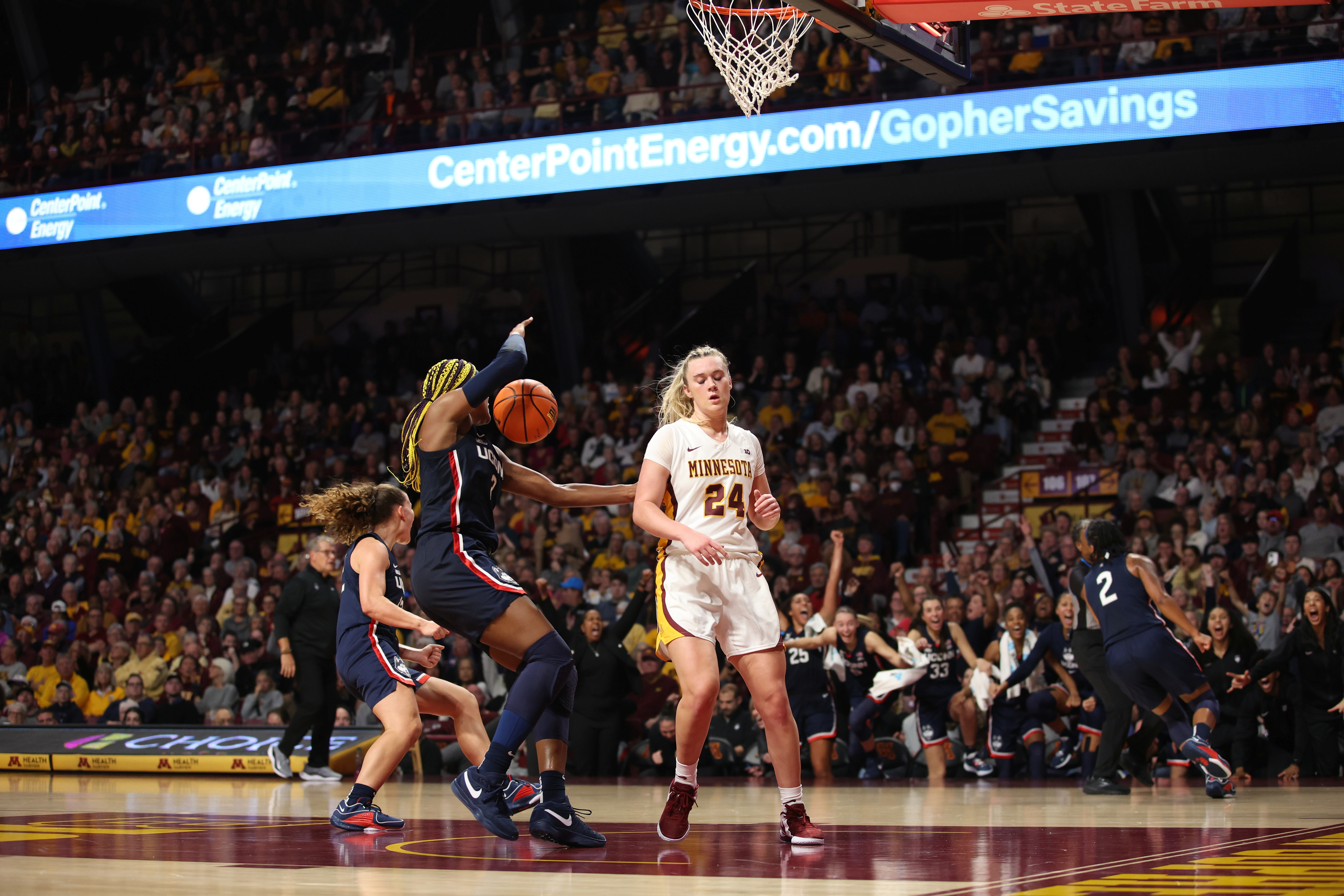
MN Gophers vs U Conn, mid-court buzzer beater at half time on November 19, 2023, at Williams Arena in Minneapolis, Minnesota

- Dubbed "The Dunk," by the Technician (North Carolina State University newspaper), in the 1983 NCAA Championship Finals, NC State forward Lorenzo Charles caught Dereck Whittenburg's airball and dunked it as time expired to defeat Houston 54–52. NC State won its last ten games of the season, including the ACC Tournament Championship, to become eligible for the NCAA Tournament. NC State also had the most regular season losses (10) of any previous NCAA champion.
- In the 1992 NCAA Tournament, the Georgia Tech Yellow Jackets' coach Bobby Cremins led an inexperienced Tech team to the Sweet 16, thanks to James Forrest's buzzer-beating game-winning three-pointer in the second round against USC (to which CBS commentator Al McGuire famously shouted, "Holy mackerel! Holy mackerel! Holy mackerel!"). With eight-tenths of a second left, Forrest received a half-court inbounds pass, rotated 180 degrees, and hit a three-pointer at the buzzer for the win.
- In the 1992 East Regional Final, with 2.1 seconds left and down 103–102 in overtime, Duke forward Christian Laettner caught a full-court inbounds pass from Grant Hill. He turned and hit a 17 foot (5.2 m) shot at the buzzer to give the Duke Blue Devils a 104–103 victory over the Kentucky Wildcats. The lead changed hands five times in the last 31.5 seconds of overtime.
- On January 5, 2004, the Texas Longhorns' forward P. J. Tucker hit a buzzer beater in a game against Providence College to win 79–77 in overtime. After extensive review of the instant replay, it was clear that the ball was in his hand when the game clock hit 00.0, but out before the red backboard light came on; by rule, the game ends when the backboard lights up, so the basket counted and Texas won the game.
- On January 31, 2005, Guilford College was tied at 88 with Randolph-Macon College. Randolph-Macon was shooting two free throws with six-tenths of a second left. After making the first to take an 89–88 lead, the second shot missed. Guilford player Jordan Snipes grabbed the rebound under the basket and threw the ball towards the other goal. The shot went in, giving Guilford a 91–89 victory. Snipes duplicated the shot several days later on air with the local news network WFMY-TV in Greensboro, North Carolina.
- In the 2006 NCAA Tournament First Round, #14 seed Northwestern State (LA) stunned the #3 seed Iowa Hawkeyes 64–63 with a last-second three-pointer "off the heels" in the far corner by Jermaine Wallace. Northwestern State had come back from 17 points down with 8 minutes to play.
- In a 2010 NCAA regular season game against Georgia Tech, the Maryland Terrapins, made two buzzer beaters (with only the second one counting). First, with three seconds on the clock, Greivis Vasquez made a half-court shot on the run to beat what would have been the buzzer. However, Maryland coach Keith Booth had called timeout with 1.5 seconds left, before Vasquez had released the ball. Following the timeout on the ensuing inbounds pass, the Terps got the ball to Cliff Tucker, who made a three-pointer at the buzzer to win the game 76–74.
- On February 7, 2013, in an NCAA regular season game, Tyler Griffey made an uncontested buzzer-beating layup off an inbounds pass with nine-tenths of a second left to lead the Illinois Fighting Illini to a 74–72 upset home win over #1 ranked Indiana Hoosiers.
- On March 18, 2016, during the first round of the 2016 NCAA tournament, Paul Jesperson of Northern Iowa made a buzzer beater from half court to win the game for the 11th-seeded Panthers 75–72 and upset the 6th-seeded Texas Longhorns.
- On March 20, 2016, during the second round of the 2016 NCAA tournament, with 2.6 seconds left and the game tied at 63, Wisconsin's Bronson Koenig made a three-point buzzer beater after receiving an inbound pass from Ethan Happ. This resulted in the 7th-seeded Wisconsin upsetting the 2nd-seeded Xavier.
- On April 4, 2016, Villanova's Kris Jenkins hit a three-pointer at the buzzer to defeat North Carolina to win the 2016 NCAA tournament, 77–74.
- On March 24, 2017, Chris Chiozza hit a running three-pointer at the buzzer to help Florida defeat Wisconsin 84–83 in overtime during the NCAA Tournament's Sweet Sixteen.
- On April 3, 2021, Gonzaga's Jalen Suggs hit a three-pointer at the buzzer to defeat UCLA to win the NCAA Tournament Final Four, 93–90. Gonzaga would go on to the championship but lost to Baylor 86–70.
- On April 1, 2023, SDSU's Lamont Butler hit a jumper at the buzzer to defeat FAU to win the NCAA Tournament Final Four, 72-71.

=== NBA ===
==== Regular season ====
- 1991–92 regular season:
  - On January 14, 1992, Larry Johnson, in his rookie season, hit a buzzer beater to give his Charlotte Hornets a 117–116 overtime victory over the Seattle SuperSonics.
- 1997–98 regular season:
  - On March 15, 1998, Voshon Lenard hit a buzzer beater to give his Miami Heat a 79–76 victory over the Orlando Magic. The goal was initially disallowed, but following video review, it was allowed after it was determined that the ball was out of Lenard's hands before the Orlando Arena game clock struck 00:0.
- 2006–07 regular season:
  - On January 3, 2007, Gilbert Arenas scored a 32 foot (9.8 m) buzzer-beater to lead the Washington Wizards to win the game against the Milwaukee Bucks 108–105.
  - On January 15, 2007, Gilbert Arenas' game-winning three-point shot led the Washington Wizards to a 114–111 victory against the Utah Jazz.
- 2008–09 regular season
  - On December 2, 2008, Troy Murphy tipped in a buzzer-beating shot to lift the Indiana Pacers over the Los Angeles Lakers 118–117.
  - On January 23, 2009, LeBron James scored a buzzer beater to lead the Cleveland Cavaliers to a 106–105 victory against the Golden State Warriors.
- 2009–10 regular season:
  - On December 4, 2009, Kobe Bryant's game-winning three-pointer over Dwyane Wade gave the Los Angeles Lakers a 108–107 victory against the Miami Heat.
  - On January 14, 2010, rookie Sundiata Gaines hit a three-pointer at the buzzer to end a frenzied series of comebacks and give the Utah Jazz a 97-96 victory over the Cleveland Cavaliers on Thursday night.
  - On March 25, 2010, Josh Smith scored a putback dunk after Joe Johnson's missed shot just ahead of the buzzer, causing the Atlanta Hawks beat the Orlando Magic, earning the Hawks a third straight trip to the playoffs with an 86-84 victory.
- 2010–11 regular season:
  - On December 21, 2010, Mike Dunleavy's tip-in at the buzzer gave the Indiana Pacers a 94-93 victory over the New Orleans Hornets.
  - On December 29, 2010, Tyreke Evans made a three-pointer from mid-court as time expired, earning the Sacramento Kings a 100-98 win over the Memphis Grizzlies.
- 2011–12 regular season – On December 29, 2011, Kevin Durant of the Oklahoma City Thunder led the team to a 104–102 win over the Dallas Mavericks, thanks to his game-winning dagger three-pointer.
- 2013–14 regular season:
  - On November 9, 2013, Jeff Green hit a three-pointer at the buzzer to lift the Boston Celtics to a 111-110 victory over the Miami Heat.
  - On November 15, 2013, Joe Johnson stole a pass and dropped in a short jumper as time expired in overtime, giving the Brooklyn Nets a 100-98 win over the Phoenix Suns on Friday night.
  - On February 7, 2014, Tobias Harris scored a game-winning dunk as the buzzer sounded as Orlando Magic won 104–103 against the Oklahoma City Thunder.
  - On February 24, 2014, Dirk Nowitzki's 19 foot (5.8 m) jumper bounced up and then fell in as time expired, giving the Dallas Mavericks a 110-108 victory over the New York Knicks.
- 2014–15 regular season:
  - On November 14, 2014, Courtney Lee scored on a lob pass as time expired to cap a fourth-quarter rally, and the Memphis Grizzlies came from 26 points down to beat the Sacramento Kings 111-110 on Thursday night.
  - On January 23, 2015, James Harden creates space and knocks down the game-winning jumper as time expires to lead the Houston Rockets to a 113-111 victory over the Phoenix Suns.
  - On February 6, 2015, Anthony Davis led the New Orleans Pelicans to a 116–113 win vs. the Oklahoma City Thunder.
- 2015–16 regular season – On March 23, 2016, Emmanuel Mudiay made a 35 foot (11 m) shot at the buzzer to finish with 27 points and give the Denver Nuggets a 104-103 victory over the Philadelphia 76ers.
- 2016–17 regular season:
  - On January 4, 2017, Giannis Antetokounmpo made a turnaround jumper at the buzzer to give the Milwaukee Bucks a 105-104 victory over the New York Knicks.
  - On March 5, 2017, then-Phoenix Suns rookie Tyler Ulis made the three-point shot at the buzzer to upset the Boston Celtics and win the game for the Suns 109–106.
  - On April 9, 2017, Russell Westbrook led the Oklahoma City Thunder to a 106–105 win against the Denver Nuggets with his record 42nd triple-double of the season and a buzzer beater.
- 2017–18 regular season:
  - On October 23, 2017, Andrew Wiggins made a three-point shot as the buzzer sounded to lead the Minnesota Timberwolves to a 115–113 victory against the Oklahoma City Thunder.
  - On December 26, 2017, Tyson Chandler dunked Dragan Bender's inbounds pass from the opposite sideline with 0.4 seconds remaining to give the Phoenix Suns a 99-97 victory over the Memphis Grizzlies.
  - On February 7, 2018, LeBron James scored another game winner at the buzzer in overtime to lead the Cleveland Cavaliers 140–138 against the Minnesota Timberwolves.
- 2018–19 regular season:
  - On December 23, 2018, Luka Dončić of the Dallas Mavericks scored a game-tying buzzer beater to tie the Portland Trail Blazers 107–all and force an overtime.
  - On February 7, 2019, Rajon Rondo's game-winning shot against his former team, the Boston Celtics, for the Los Angeles Lakers to win the game 129–128.
  - On February 27, 2019, Dwyane Wade of the Miami Heat scored a three-point shot with no time left to defeat the Golden State Warriors 126–125.
  - On March 24, 2019, Jeremy Lamb hit the half-court shot against the Kawhi Leonard-led Toronto Raptors to win the game for the Charlotte Hornets 115–114.
- 2020–21 regular season:
  - On December 23, 2020, Buddy Hield pushed the ball to lead the Sacramento Kings to a 124–122 win against the Denver Nuggets.
  - On March 27, 2021, Harrison Barnes of the Sacramento Kings scored a three-pointer as the time expired to win the game 100–97 against the Cleveland Cavaliers.
  - On April 14, 2021, Luka Dončić scored a regular season buzzer-beater to lead the Dallas Mavericks to a 114–113 victory against the Memphis Grizzlies.
  - On May 3, 2021, Ben Simmons saved Joel Embiid's attempt at a three-point shot to lift the Philadelphia 76ers to a 113–111 victory against the San Antonio Spurs in overtime.
- 2021–22 regular season:
  - On October 27, 2021, Harrison Barnes of the Sacramento Kings scores the three-pointer to 110-107 comeback victory against Phoenix Suns.
  - On November 6, 2021, Luka Dončić scored a three-point buzzer-beater to lead the Dallas Mavericks to a 107-104 victory against the Boston Celtics, he shot buzzer-beaters twice in six months and during two regular seasons.
  - On December 15, 2021, Devonte' Graham scored an improbable 61 foot (19 m) buzzer-beater right after Shai Gilgeous-Alexander's 30 foot (9.1 m) shot with 1.4 seconds remaining, lifting New Orleans Pelicans to a 113-110 victory over the Oklahoma City Thunder.
  - On December 31, 2021, DeMar DeRozan of the Chicago Bulls scores the one-legged buzzer beater to lead the Chicago Bulls to a 108-106 victory over Indiana Pacers. The following night, he scored another buzzer-beater to beat the Washington Wizards 120-119, making him the first man to beat the buzzers twice in two days.
  - On January 6, 2022, RJ Barrett of the New York Knicks hit a three-point buzzer-beater off the glass over Jayson Tatum of the Boston Celtics to give the Knicks the 108-105 victory.
  - On January 21, 2022, Stephen Curry of the Golden State Warriors scored a buzzer beater against the Houston Rockets guard Kevin Porter Jr. to allow the Warriors to win 105-103. It was Curry's first career game-winning buzzer beater.
  - On February 16, 2022, Stephen Curry's clutch shot gave the Golden State Warriors a 115–114 lead against the Denver Nuggets. A free throw from the Warriors followed and then Monte Morris scored a game-winning three-pointer, and the Nuggets won 117–116.
- 2022–23 regular season:
  - On November 5, 2022, De'Aaron Fox of Sacramento Kings scored a game-winning 31-foot buzzer beater from the center court logo in overtime, resulting in a 126–123 victory over the Orlando Magic.
  - On March 17, 2023, Maxi Kleber of the Dallas Mavericks made a buzzer-beating, game-winning three-pointer in a 111–110 win over the Los Angeles Lakers.
- 2023–24 regular season:
  - On December 16, 2023, Jimmy Butler of the Miami Heat pulled off a stepback buzzer-beating jumper against his former team, the Chicago Bulls, to give Miami a 118–116 win.
  - On December 19, 2023, Ja Morant of the Memphis Grizzlies made his return from a 25-game suspension, pulling off a buzzer-beating game-winning jumper and won the game against the New Orleans Pelicans 115-113.
  - On March 17, 2024, Kyrie Irving scored a left-handed floater over Nikola Jokić to give the Dallas Mavericks a 107-105 win over the Denver Nuggets on NBA Sunday Showcase.
- 2024–25 regular season:
  - On November 6, 2024, Brandon Miller of the Charlotte Hornets tipped the ball in at the buzzer to give the Hornets a 108–107 victory over the Detroit Pistons.
  - On November 16, 2024, Jayson Tatum of the Boston Celtics scored a game winning 30 foot (9.1 m) three-pointer at the buzzer to lead the give the Celtics a 126–123 overtime victory over the Toronto Raptors.
  - On November 17, 2024, Julius Randle of the Minnesota Timberwolves scored a game-winning three-point buzzer-beater to give the Timberwolves a 120–117 victory over the Phoenix Suns.
  - On November 25, 2024, Jaden Ivey of the Detroit Pistons scored a buzzer-beating game-winning jumper to give the Pistons a 102–100 victory over the Toronto Raptors.
  - On January 8, 2025, Trae Young of the Atlanta Hawks shot a 50 foot (15 m) half-court buzzer beater to secure a 124–121 victory over the Utah Jazz, despite Collin Sexton's game-tying three-pointer.
  - On February 6, 2025, Darius Garland of the Cleveland Cavaliers scored a 31 foot (9.4 m) buzzer-beating three-pointer to give the Cavaliers a 118–115 victory over the Detroit Pistons.
  - On March 26, 2025, LeBron James's game-winning tip-in shot stunned the Indiana Pacers in the Los Angeles Lakers' 120–119 road win. It was his eighth career game-winning buzzer beater (including playoffs), and his first as a Laker.
  - On March 27, 2025, Josh Giddey capped his triple-double performance of 25 points, 14 rebounds, and 11 assists with a half-court buzzer beater over LeBron James in the Chicago Bulls' 119–117 win over the Los Angeles Lakers. He became the first ever player to score a triple-double and a game-winning buzzer beater against the Lakers, who became the fifth team to win and lose on buzzer-beaters in consecutive days.
  - On April 13, 2025, Bub Carrington scored an improbable fade in buzzer beater to help Washington Wizards finish the season with 18–64 record and win over Miami Heat with final score 119–118.
- 2025–26 regular season:
  - On October 29, 2025, Austin Reaves hit a floater to lead the Los Angeles Lakers to a 116-115 road victory over the Minnesota Timberwolves.

==== Playoffs ====
- In Game 1 of the 1950 NBA Finals, Bob Harrison hit a 40 foot (12 m) buzzer-beater to win the game for the Lakers, 68–66.
- In Game 6 of the 1956 NBA Finals, Cliff Hagan makes a shot to force a Game 7 as the Hawks beat the Celtics.
- In Game 3 of the 1962 NBA Finals, Jerry West steals the ball and makes a layup as the time expired to give the Lakers a 2–1 series lead over the Celtics.
- In Game 4 of the 1969 NBA Finals, Sam Jones hit an off-balance 18 foot (5.5 m) as time expired to lift the Celtics to a series-tying 89–88 win over the Lakers.
- In Game 3 of the 1970 NBA Finals, with the Lakers trailing the Knicks 102–100. Jerry West sank a desperation buzzer-beating 60 foot (18 m) shot to tie the game. Since the three-point field goal was not adopted until the 1979–80 NBA season, it only tied the game. The Lakers lost 111–108 in OT.
- In Game 5 of the 1976 NBA Finals, Gar Heard hit a buzzer beater against the Boston Celtics to tie the game at 112 and force a third overtime. This was one of the many high points of the game, which the Celtics won, 128–126. Heard's shot is one of the reasons the NBA refers to Game 5 as "The Greatest Game Ever Played".
- In Game 1 of the 1986 Eastern Conference First Round, Dudley Bradley banked in a three-pointer at the buzzer to win the game 95–94 for the Bullets after the 76ers led 94–77 with three minutes left.
- In Game 3 of the 1986 Western Conference Semifinals, Derek Harper hit a long three-pointer with three seconds left to beat the Lakers, 110–108.
- In Game 5 of the 1986 Western Conference Finals, the Rockets and Lakers were tied at 112 with one second left and the ball at half-court. Ralph Sampson hit a turn-around shot at the buzzer to win the series for Houston.
- In Game 5 of the 1989 Eastern Conference First Round, Michael Jordan took the inbounds pass with three seconds left, sprinted to the free throw line and hit The Shot over Craig Ehlo at the buzzer to beat the Cleveland Cavaliers 101–100.
- In Game 4 of the 1993 Eastern Conference First Round, with Charlotte down 103–102 with 3.3 seconds left, Alonzo Mourning took the inbounds pass and hit a 20 foot (6.1 m) shot with four-tenths of a second left.
- In Game 4 of the 1993 Eastern Conference Semifinals, "The Shot II". With the score tied at 101, Michael Jordan made an 18 foot (5.5 m) fade-away over Gerald Wilkins at the buzzer to give the Bulls a 103–101 victory and sweep Cleveland.
- In Game 3 of the 1994 Eastern Conference Semifinals with 1.8 seconds left and the Bulls down 2–0 in the series, Toni Kukoč sank a 23 foot (7.0 m) fadeaway at the buzzer to give Chicago a 104–102 victory over New York.
- In Game 5 of the 1995 Western Conference Semifinals, Nick Van Exel hit a three-pointer with five-tenths of a second left in OT to give the Lakers a 98–96 win over the Spurs. He had also hit a three-pointer with 10.2 seconds left in regulation to tie it at 88 and force overtime.
- In Game 1 of the 1995 Eastern Conference Semifinals, Reggie Miller scored 8 points in 8.9 seconds to erase a 6-point deficit and beat New York, 107–105.
- In Game 4 of the 1995 Eastern Conference Finals, Indiana's Rik Smits faked a shot over Tree Rollins, then hit a 10 foot (3.0 m) shot at the buzzer to beat Orlando 94–93. The lead changed hands four times in the last 13.3 seconds.
- In Game 1 of the 1995 NBA Finals, Houston's Hakeem Olajuwon tipped in a missed layup by Clyde Drexler with three-tenths of a second left in OT to beat the Magic 120–118.
- In Game 4 of the 1997 Western Conference First Round, the Suns' Rex Chapman caught an overthrown Jason Kidd pass and made a falling-out-of-bounds three-pointer with 1.9 seconds left to tie it at 107. The Suns still lost 122–115 in OT.
- In Game 4 of the 1997 Western Conference Finals, Houston's Eddie Johnson hit a buzzer-beating three-pointer to beat Utah 95–92.
- In Game 6 of the 1997 Western Conference Finals, John Stockton hit a three-pointer at the buzzer, lifting Utah over Houston 103–100 to win the series 4–2.
- In Game 1 of the 1997 NBA Finals, Michael Jordan hit a jumper over Bryon Russell at the buzzer to give Chicago an 84–82 victory.
- In Game 4 of the 1998 Eastern Conference Finals, Indiana was trailing Chicago 94–93 with 2.9 seconds left. Derrick McKey inbounded to Reggie Miller, who hit the game-winning three-pointer with seven-tenths left. They still lost the Series. The Bulls went on to win the NBA Championship against the Utah Jazz.
- In Game 4 of the 2002 NBA Western Conference Finals, the Lakers were trailing the Kings 99–97 with 11.8 seconds left. The Lakers were trailing 2–1 in the series and faced Game 5 in Sacramento. After Kobe Bryant and Shaquille O'Neal missed consecutive layups, Vlade Divac swatted the ball away in a vain attempt to run out the clock. However, it went right to Robert Horry, who caught the ball and hit a three-pointer at the buzzer to give the Lakers a 100–99 victory.
- In Game 1 of the 2003 Western Conference First Round, Stephon Marbury of the Phoenix Suns scored a buzzer beater and had a 96-95 victory against the San Antonio Spurs.
- In Game 5 of the 2004 Western Conference Semifinals, Tim Duncan made a fade-away 18 foot (5.5 m) shot over Shaquille O'Neal to give the Spurs a 73–72 lead with four-tenths of a second left, but Derek Fisher hit a 20 foot (6.1 m) at the buzzer to win the game for the Lakers 74–73.
- In Game 5 of the 2004 Eastern Conference Semifinals, with the series tied at 2, the Detroit Pistons were down 88–85 to the Nets with no timeouts. Chauncey Billups banked in a three-pointer from half-court at the buzzer to tie the game at 88. Detroit lost in the third overtime, but won the series in seven games and proceeded to defeat the Lakers 4–1 in the NBA Finals.
- In Game 4 of the 2006 Western Conference First Round, Kobe Bryant made a buzzer beater to defeat Phoenix 99–98 and give the Lakers a 3–1 series lead. The Phoenix Suns, however, won the series in seven games and are the 8th team to overcome a 3–1 series deficit.
- In Game 2 of the 2009 Eastern Conference Finals, LeBron James took the inbounds pass and hit a three-pointer at the buzzer to give the Cavaliers a 96–95 victory over the Orlando Magic. This buzzer beater caused the Cavs to tie the series against the Orlando Magic.
- In Game 5 of the 2010 Western Conference Finals, after Kobe Bryant air-balled a three-point shot, Ron Artest hit the put-back at the buzzer to give the Los Angeles Lakers a 103–101 win over the Phoenix Suns to give the Lakers a 3–2 series lead. The Lakers won the series 4–2 and went on to win their 2nd straight title.
- In Game 1 of the 2013 Eastern Conference Finals, with the Heat down 102–101 in overtime against the Indiana Pacers, LeBron James made a driving lay-up as time expired in overtime to give the Heat a 103–102 win over the Pacers.
- In Game 3 of the 2014 Western Conference First Round, Vince Carter hit a three-point shot from the left corner at the buzzer, giving the Mavericks a 109–108 victory and a 2–1 series lead over the San Antonio Spurs. However, Dallas would lose in seven games to the eventual NBA champion Spurs.
- In Game 6 of the 2014 Western Conference First Round, with the Portland Trail Blazers down 98–96 with nine-tenths left, Damian Lillard hit a buzzer beating three-pointer off the inbounds pass to beat the Houston Rockets 99–98 and win the series 4–2.
- In Game 3 of the 2015 Eastern Conference Semifinals, Derrick Rose banked in a three-pointer at the buzzer to give the Chicago Bulls a 99–96 win against the Cavaliers and take a 2–1 series lead.
- In Game 4 of the 2015 Eastern Conference Semifinals, LeBron James hit a corner two-pointer at the buzzer to give the Cavaliers an 86–84 win against the Bulls and tie the series at two, while Cavaliers coach David Blatt was being held back from trying to call a timeout. Cleveland had none at the time, and the technical foul would have given Chicago a free throw and possession.
- In Game 3 of the 2015 Eastern Conference Semifinals, Paul Pierce banked in a step-back 21 foot (6.4 m) shot at the buzzer to give the Washington Wizards a 103–101 win against the Atlanta Hawks and take a 2–1 series lead.
- In Game 1 of the 2016 Eastern Conference Semifinals, Kyle Lowry of the Toronto Raptors hit a half-court shot at the buzzer to tie it at 90. Toronto eventually lost to the Heat 102–96 in overtime.
- In Game 5 of the 2018 Eastern Conference First Round, LeBron James hit a game winner at the buzzer to give the Cavaliers a 98–95 win against the Pacers and take a 3–2 series lead.
- In Game 3 of the 2018 Eastern Conference Semifinals, LeBron James hit a floater at the buzzer to defeat the Raptors 105–103 and take a 3–0 series lead.
- In Game 5 of the 2019 Western Conference First Round, Damian Lillard hit a game-winning three-pointer at the buzzer from 36 feet (11 m) and Paul George's outstretched arm to beat the Thunder 118–115 and win the series 4–1.
- In Game 7 of the 2019 Eastern Conference Semifinals, Kawhi Leonard's last-second shot bounced off the rim four times before falling to give the Raptors a 92–90 victory over the 76ers to advance to the Eastern Conference finals; the Toronto Raptors then went on to win the 2019 NBA Finals.
- In Game 4 of the 2020 Western Conference First Round, Luka Dončić hit a 28 foot (8.5 m) three-pointer at the buzzer to win the game for the Mavericks, 135–133 over the Clippers.
- In Game 2 of the 2020 Western Conference Finals, with the Lakers trailing 103–102 to the Nuggets, Anthony Davis hit a three-pointer with 2.1 seconds to win the game, 105–103, and give the Lakers a 2–0 series lead.
- In Game 2 of the 2021 Western Conference Finals, with the Suns trailing 103–102, Deandre Ayton puts up 24 points, alongside a buzzer-beating, game-winning alley-oop dunk, and 14 rebounds, to beat the Los Angeles Clippers.
- In Game 1 of the 2022 Eastern Conference First Round, the Boston Celtics defeated the Brooklyn Nets 115–114 with Jayson Tatum's buzzer-beating layup.
- In Game 6 of the 2023 Eastern Conference Finals, with Celtics trailing 103-102 and three seconds remaining, Derrick White inbounded to Marcus Smart, whose three-point shot with two seconds to go bounced off the basket, but then, with 0.1 seconds remaining, White grabbed the rebound and tipped the ball in to give Celtics the 104-103 win and force the deciding Game 7 against the Miami Heat.
- In Game 2 of the 2024 Western Conference First Round, Jamal Murray hit a buzzer-beating jumper over Anthony Davis, completing the Nuggets' twenty-point comeback over the Lakers and giving his team a 2–0 series lead. Murray would later score another game winner in Game 5 to eliminate the Lakers for good, making him the only player to score two game winners in the same playoff series.
- In Game 4 of the 2025 Western Conference First Round, Aaron Gordon pulled-off a buzzer beating slam dunk, following an offensive rebound of a missed three-point attempt by Nikola Jokić, to lead Denver Nuggets to a 101–99 win over Los Angeles Clippers, and tie the series at two. This was the first game-winning buzzer-beating dunk in NBA playoffs history.
- In Game 1 of the 2025 Eastern Conference Finals, Tyrese Haliburton hit a buzzer beater from the three-point line at the end of the 4th quarter for the Indiana Pacers against the New York Knicks. The ball hit the back of the rim, bounced high up in the air, and then fell through the hoop to tie the game at 125–125. The shot was initially thought to be a game-winning three-pointer, but replay showed that Haliburton's right foot was on the line, making the shot game-tying instead of game-winning. The Pacers went on to win the game in overtime. This was one of Haliburton's four game winners in the 2025 NBA playoffs.

=== Olympics and Europe ===
- In the 1972 Olympic men's basketball final, Alexander Belov of the Soviet Union scored a last-second basket after catching a full-court desperation launch by a teammate. As time expired, Belov hit a layup that won the game 51–50 against the U.S. team.
- In the second round of the 1997 Eurobasket, in a high-strung game between FR Yugoslavia and Croatia (the first one after the breakup of SFR Yugoslavia and the ensuing Yugoslav wars), Aleksandar Đorđević won the game for Yugoslavia 64–62 with a coast-to-coast three-pointer. The same player won the 1992 Euroleague title for Partizan Belgrade in strikingly similar fashion (albeit with two seconds left on the clock).
- (Euroleague) On April 7, 2004, Maccabi Tel Aviv was trailing Žalgiris at home, on the decisive round-robin match to determine which team advances to the Final Four tournament, held later that month on Maccabi's home court in Tel Aviv. Maccabi's failure to advance would mean utter disaster, as team officials battled all season long against Euroleague attempts to relocate the tournament due to ensuing Al-Aqsa Intifada and similar UEFA ban on football (soccer) matches hosted in Israel. With two seconds remaining and Maccabi trailing by three, Derrick Sharp caught a long pass from Gur Shelef, turned to the basket and fired a game-tying fade-away three-pointer, forcing overtime. Maccabi won that game, advanced to the Final Four and became Euroleague Champion, winning the final game against Skipper Bologna by the all-time record score of 118–74.
- On August 15, 2004, in the preliminary round at the 2004 Summer Olympics, after a run of Alejandro Montecchia, Manu Ginóbili received the ball trailing 82–81 against Serbia and Montenegro with seven-tenths of a second left. He made the shot while falling sideways after it hit the board. Argentina then would win the gold medal.
- In an exhibition match between the US and Germany during the run-up to the 2004 Summer Olympics, a less than stellar Team USA was saved by Allen Iverson (then of the Philadelphia 76ers), who hit a half-court shot to keep the game from going into overtime.
- On April 25, 2010, in the title game of the 2009–10 ABA League, Partizan Belgrade topped Cibona Zagreb in overtime in Arena Zagreb, thanks to an off-the-glass three-pointer by Dušan Kecman from half-court at the buzzer, bringing the celebration of Cibona players and staff (who already invaded the floor as Bojan Bogdanović hit a corner three-pointer for Cibona with just six-tenths left on the clock) to an abrupt end. Partizan thus won its fourth consecutive Adriatic League title. The final score was 75–74.
- On January 24, 2014, in a Top 16 Euroleague game between Anadolu Efes and EA7 Emporio Armani Milan, Efes was trailing by two points when Keith Langford from Milan had another free throw attempt (after hitting the first one) with three seconds left on the game clock. He missed the second free throw so that Anadolu Efes could not take another timeout. Zoran Planinić from Anadolu Efes then grabbed the rebound, took one dribble and threw the ball from within their own three point line to the basket of Milan. He made it and no time remained on the game clock; the final score was 61–60.
- On April 25, 2014, in the semifinal game of the 2013–14 ABA League Final Four, between Partizan Belgrade and Cedevita Zagreb, Cedevita was trailing with one less point and possession. Milenko Tepić of Partizan missed the three-point shot with six seconds left, Nolan Smith of Cedevita grabbed the ball, ran to the other side of the court with his defenders not guarding him, and hit a running three-point buzzer beater from 30 feet (9.1 m). The final score was 81–79. The shot secured a spot in the 2014–15 Euroleague season for Cedevita, while leaving Partizan out of the Euroleague for the first time after 14 years, and the first time since the ULEB takeover of the competition in 2000.
- On September 16, 2018, Greece national basketball team qualified to the 2019 FIBA Basketball World Cup after a thrilling win with a buzzer beater made by Kostas Papanikolaou after a Nick Calathes assist in Tbilisi over Georgia 86–85.

=== Asia ===
==== PBA ====
- In Game 6 of the 2016 PBA Governors' Cup Finals, Justin Brownlee hits the championship-winning three-point shot at the buzzer against the Meralco Bolts to end the eight-year championship drought of Barangay Ginebra San Miguel, with the score of 91–88 at the end.
- In Game 5 of the 2019 PBA Philippine Cup Finals, Mark Barroca gave the Magnolia Hotshots a 3–2 Finals lead against the eventual champions San Miguel Beermen, the final score is 88–86.

==== MPBL ====
- In the winner-take-all championship game of the 2021 MPBL Invitational, Philip Manalang of the Basilan Jumbo Plastic, hits the championship-winning three-point shot at the buzzer against the Nueva Ecija Rice Vanguards to win the 2 million Philippine pesos prize with the score of 83–80 in overtime.

== In other sports ==
The term is sometimes applied to analogous achievements in other sports.

=== Ice hockey ===
In ice hockey, a buzzer beater is a goal that is scored just before the clock expires in a period. Unlike in basketball, the puck must completely cross the goal line with 0.1 seconds or more remaining on the clock for the goal to count; if the period expires (the exact moment when the green goal light comes on at 0.0 seconds) before the puck completely crosses the goal line, the goal is disallowed.

=== Football ===
In Australian rules football there are kicks after the siren, where a mark or free kick awarded just before the end of a quarter may be kicked as the final action of that period. In Gaelic football, play is extended to allow for the kick of a free kick or puck awarded prior to the end of a half.

In gridiron football, a touchdown after time expires or a field goal (or, much more rarely, a successful fair catch kick in American football or an open-field single point in Canadian) kicked as time expires can be described as a "buzzer beater," though no actual buzzers are used in that sport. More generally, in all codes, if a play (regardless of if it involves a kick) is in progress at the time the clock expires, play continues until the ball is dead. (In American football, the snap on the buzzer-beating play must take place before the clock expires, except if the defense commits a foul on the last play, in which case an untimed down is added. In Canadian football, a play can and must be executed even if the clock expires after the previous play but before the snap.) Several important games have been decided on the outcome of buzzer beaters, such as Super Bowl XXXVI and Super Bowl XXXVIII, both of which were decided on successful kicks by Adam Vinatieri; in contrast, Scott Norwood's infamous missed kick in Super Bowl XXV decided that game in favor of the opposing New York Giants. A related concept in football is the Hail Mary pass.

In rugby union the game does not end until the ball goes dead after the time has expired (If a try is scored after time has expired, the team is allowed to kick the conversion). Therefore, if a side trailing by 6 or less points can maintain possession and keep the ball in play, they have a chance of victory. A rule change in 2017 amended the rules so that if a penalty is awarded, the ball can be kicked out and a line-out taken, even if time has elapsed. The rules in rugby league also allow for play after time has elapsed; however, a tackle will also end the game, meaning that significant extensions are less likely.

In association football, matches or halves are ended at the main referee's discretion (provided that regular time has expired by then), and at the higher levels of play, they almost never end it unless the ball is around the midfield at the time or if the ball is dead while the allocated stoppage time has been surpassed by a minute or more. As such, scenarios where buzzer beaters could theoretically occur almost never happen. In the very rare scenarios where a referee does blow the whistle to end the half or match while a ball is almost scored but has not crossed the goal line, it does not count as a goal.

=== Lacrosse ===
Starting with the 2018 season, the National Federation of State High School Associations rules for high school boys' field lacrosse in the United States allow for buzzer-beaters. A goal counts if the shot was released before the official's whistle signaling the end of play for any period of the game, even if it goes in after having previously contacted part of the goal or a defensive player (post-whistle shots that contact an offensive player in any way before entering the goal, however, do not count). The opposing team may request a stick check after buzzer-beaters, unless it comes at the end of the game and does not result in overtime, since the rules consider the game over at that point.

US Lacrosse similarly changed the youth rules the same season to allow buzzer-beaters. However, the National Collegiate Athletic Association rules for men's lacrosse still require that any shot enter the goal before the whistle to score.

=== Handball ===
Similar to ice hockey, goals in regular handball gameplay only count if they cross the goal line before time runs out. The exception is if a free throw or a seven-meter throw is called while the clock runs out. Should a goal be scored in such a scenario, and the shooting player has kept one of their legs (it can be either one, but they cannot switch the leg partway through) on the ground during the shot, the goal counts.

== See also ==
- Half-court shot (basketball)
- Last-minute goal (soccer)
- List of Hail Mary passes in American football
- List of longest NBA field goals
- Kicks after the siren in Australian rules football
- Walk-off home run
