= 2010 NCAA Men's Basketball All-Americans =

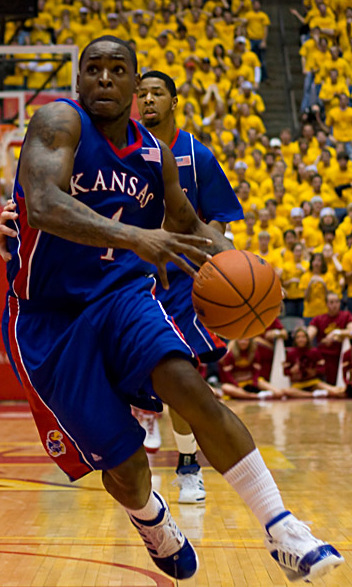
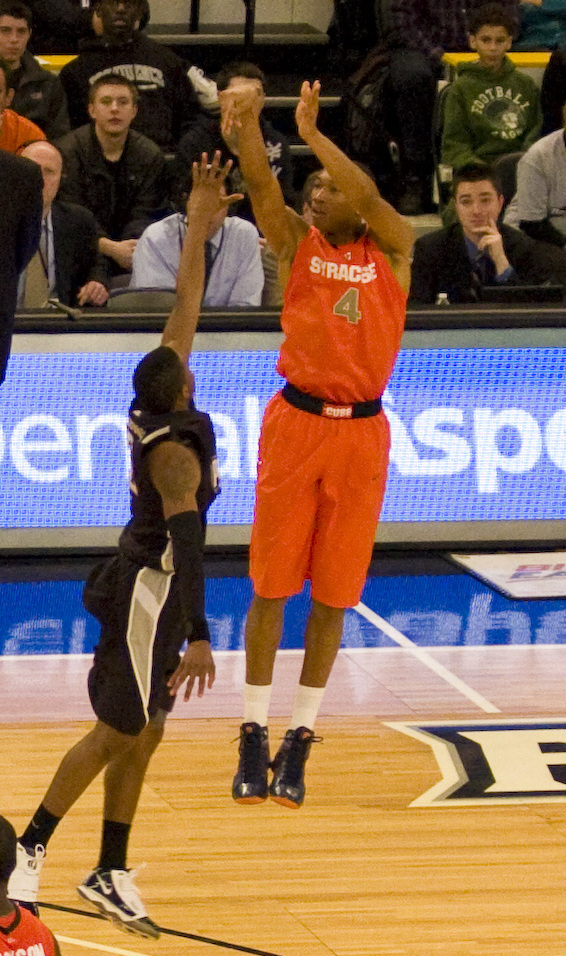
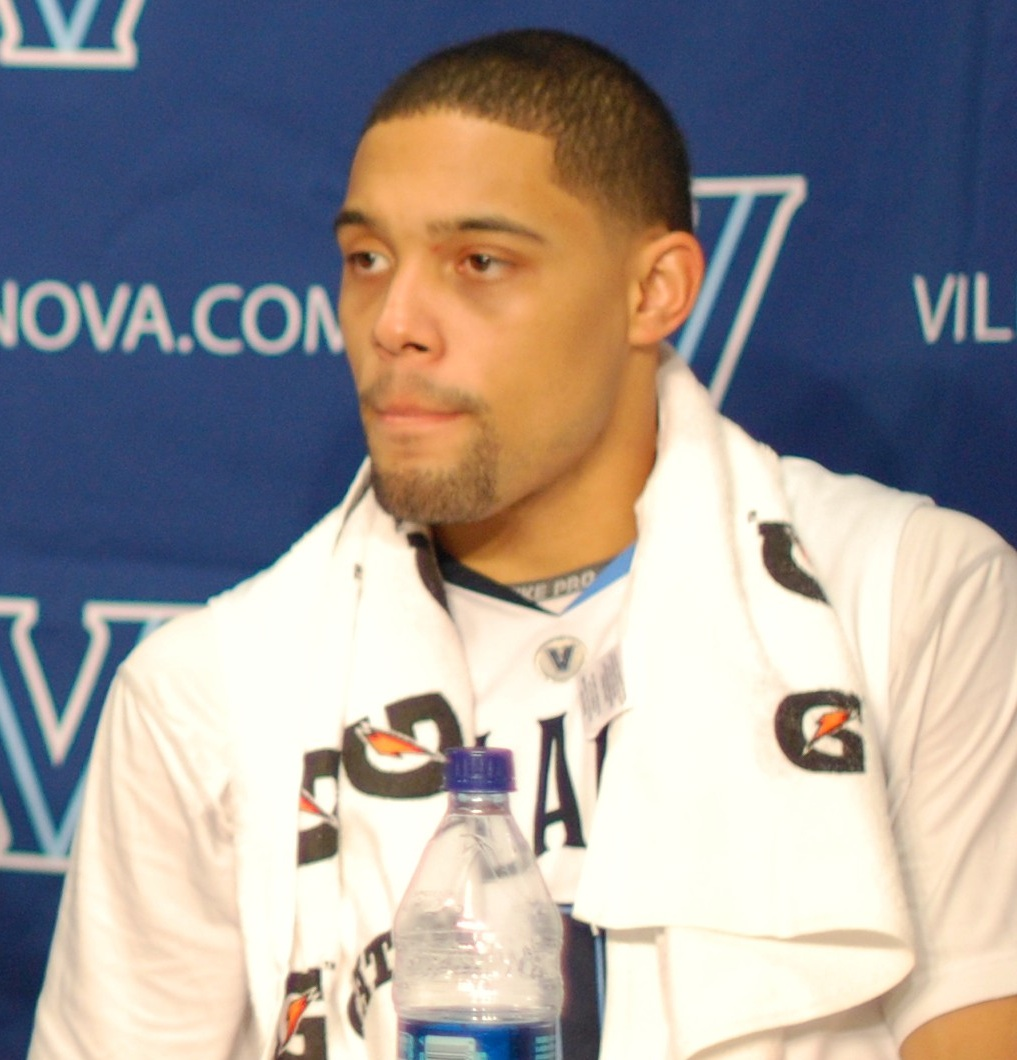
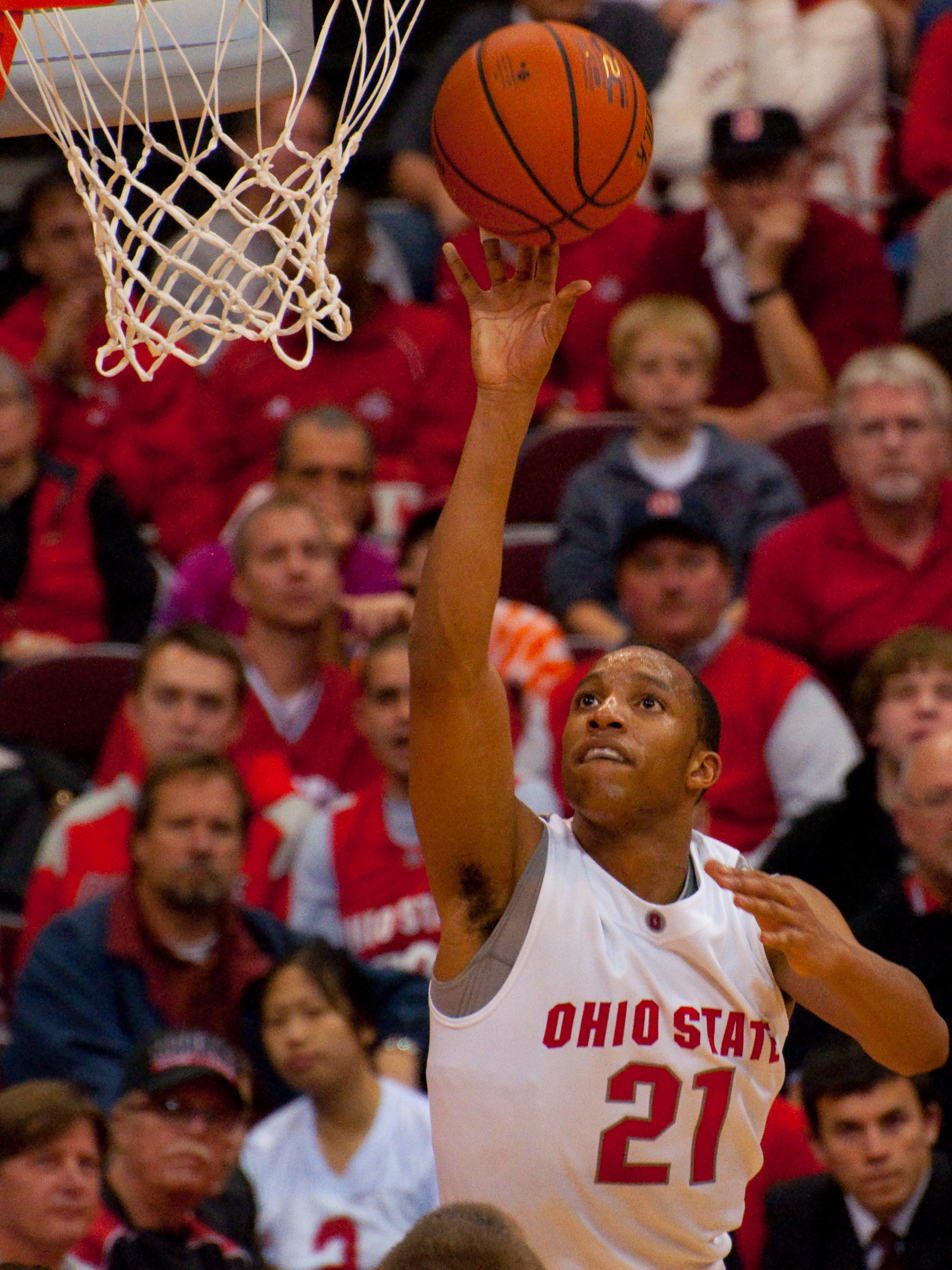
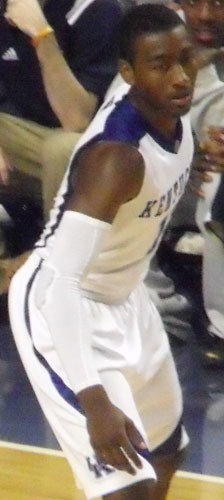
- The 2010 consensus first team. Clockwise from top left: Collins, Johnson, Wall, Turner, Reynolds.
- Awarded for: 2009–10 NCAA Division I men's basketball season

An All-American team is an honorary sports team composed of the best amateur players of a specific season for each team position—who in turn are given the honorific "All-America" and typically referred to as "All-American athletes", or simply "All-Americans". Although the honorees generally do not compete together as a unit, the term is used in U.S. team sports to refer to players who are selected by members of the national media. Walter Camp selected the first All-America team in the early days of American football in 1889. The 2010 NCAA Men's Basketball All-Americans are honorary lists that include All-American selections from the Associated Press (AP), the United States Basketball Writers Association (USBWA), the Sporting News (TSN), and the National Association of Basketball Coaches (NABC) for the 2009–10 NCAA Division I men's basketball season. All selectors choose at least a first and second 5-man team. The NABC and AP choose third teams, and TSN chooses third, fourth and fifth teams, while AP also lists honorable mention selections.

The Consensus 2010 College Basketball All-American team is determined by aggregating the results of the four major All-American teams as determined by the National Collegiate Athletic Association (NCAA). Since United Press International was replaced by TSN in 1997, the four major selectors have been the aforementioned ones. AP has been a selector since 1948, NABC since 1957 and USBWA since 1960. To earn "consensus" status, a player must win honors based on a point system computed from the four different all-America teams. The point system consists of three points for first team, two points for second team and one point for third team. No honorable mention or fourth team or lower are used in the computation. The top five totals plus ties are first team and the next five plus ties are second team. According to this system, Sherron Collins, Wesley Johnson, Scottie Reynolds, Evan Turner and John Wall were first team selections and Cole Aldrich, James Anderson, DeMarcus Cousins, Luke Harangody, Jon Scheyer and Greivis Vasquez were second team selections.

Although the aforementioned lists are used to determine consensus honors, there are numerous other All-American lists. The ten finalists for the John Wooden Award are described as Wooden All-Americans. The ten finalists for the Lowe's Senior CLASS Award are described as Senior All-Americans. Other All-American lists include those determined by Fox Sports, and Yahoo! Sports. The scholar-athletes selected by College Sports Information Directors of America (CoSIDA) are termed Academic All-Americans.

== 2010 Consensus All-America team ==
The following players are recognized as the 2010 Consensus All-Americans (including six second team members due to a tie).

PG – Point guard
SG – Shooting guard
PF – Power forward
SF – Small forward
C – Center

Consensus First Team
Player	Position	Class	Team
Sherron Collins	PG	Senior	Kansas
Wesley Johnson	SF	Junior	Syracuse
Scottie Reynolds	PG	Senior	Villanova
Evan Turner	SF/SG	Junior	Ohio State
John Wall	PG	Freshman	Kentucky

Consensus Second Team
Player	Position	Class	Team
Cole Aldrich	C	Junior	Kansas
James Anderson	SG	Sophomore	Oklahoma State
DeMarcus Cousins	C	Freshman	Kentucky
Luke Harangody	PF	Senior	Notre Dame
Jon Scheyer	PG	Senior	Duke
Greivis Vasquez	PG	Senior	Maryland

== Individual All-America teams ==
The table below details the selections for four major 2010 college basketball All-American teams. The number corresponding to the team designation (i.e., whether a player was a first team, second team, etc. selection) appears in the table. The following columns are included in the table:

Player – The name of the All-American
School – Collegiate affiliation
AP – Associated Press All-American Team
USBWA – United States Basketball Writers Association All-American Team
NABC – National Association of Basketball Coaches All-American Team
TSN – Sporting News All-American Team
CP - Points in the consensus scoring system
Notes – Collegiate highlights

=== By player ===
Player	School	AP	USBWA	NABC	TSN	CP	Notes
Scottie Reynolds	Villanova	1	1	1	1	12	—
Evan Turner	Ohio State	1	1	1	1	12	National Player of the Year (AP, FOX, NABC, Naismith, TSN, USBWA-Robertson, Wooden)
John Wall	Kentucky	1	1	1	1	12	National Player of the Year (Rupp), Freshman of the Year (USBWA), NBA First overall draft
Wesley Johnson	Syracuse	1	1	1	2	11	—
Sherron Collins	Kansas	2	1	1	2	10	Frances Pomeroy Naismith Award, Lute Olson Award
DeMarcus Cousins	Kentucky	1	2	2	2	9	—
James Anderson	Oklahoma State	2	2	3	1	8	—
Jon Scheyer	Duke	2	2	2	2	8	—
Greivis Vasquez	Maryland	2	—	2	1	7	Bob Cousy Award
Cole Aldrich	Kansas	3	2	2	—	5	Men's Basketball Academic All-American of the Year
Luke Harangody	Notre Dame	3	2	3	3	5	—
Da'Sean Butler	West Virginia	2	—	3	—	3	Lowe's Senior CLASS Award
Damion James	Texas	3	—	—	2	3	—
Jimmer Fredette	Brigham Young	—	—	3	3	2	—
Darington Hobson	New Mexico	3	—	—	3	2	—
Robbie Hummel	Purdue	—	—	2	—	2	—
Greg Monroe	Georgetown	3	—	3	—	2	Pete Newell Big Man Award
Jordan Crawford	Xavier	—	—	—	3	1	—
Jacob Pullen	Kansas State	—	—	—	3	1	—
Matt Bouldin	Gonzaga	—	—	—	4	—	—
Tweety Carter	Baylor	—	—	—	4	—	—
Malcolm Delaney	Virginia Tech	—	—	—	4	—	—
Devan Downey	South Carolina	—	—	—	4	—	—
Jerome Randle	California	—	—	—	4	—	—
Austin Freeman	Georgetown	—	—	—	5	—	—
Lazar Hayward	Marquette	—	—	—	5	—	—
Trévon Hughes	Wisconsin	—	—	—	5	—	—
Andy Rautins	Syracuse	—	—	—	5	—	—
Kyle Singler	Duke	—	—	—	5	—	NCAA basketball tournament Most Outstanding Player

=== By team ===
All-America Team
All-America Team	First team		Second team		Third team		Fourth team		Fifth team	
All-America Team	Player	School	Player	School	Player	School	Player	School	Player	School
Associated Press	DeMarcus Cousins	Kentucky	James Anderson	Oklahoma State	Cole Aldrich	Kansas	No fourth or fifth teams			
Associated Press	Wesley Johnson	Syracuse	Da'Sean Butler	West Virginia	Luke Harangody	Notre Dame	No fourth or fifth teams			
Associated Press	Scottie Reynolds	Villanova	Sherron Collins	Kansas	Darington Hobson	New Mexico	No fourth or fifth teams			
Associated Press	Evan Turner	Ohio State	Jon Scheyer	Duke	Damion James	Texas	No fourth or fifth teams			
Associated Press	John Wall	Kentucky	Greivis Vasquez	Maryland	Greg Monroe	Georgetown	No fourth or fifth teams			
USBWA	Sherron Collins	Kansas	Cole Aldrich	Kansas	No third, fourth or fifth teams					
USBWA	Wesley Johnson	Syracuse	James Anderson	Oklahoma State	No third, fourth or fifth teams					
USBWA	Scottie Reynolds	Villanova	DeMarcus Cousins	Kentucky	No third, fourth or fifth teams					
USBWA	Evan Turner	Ohio State	Luke Harangody	Notre Dame	No third, fourth or fifth teams					
USBWA	John Wall	Kentucky	Jon Scheyer	Duke	No third, fourth or fifth teams					
NABC	Sherron Collins	Kansas	Cole Aldrich	Kansas	James Anderson	Oklahoma State	No fourth or fifth teams			
NABC	Wesley Johnson	Syracuse	DeMarcus Cousins	Kentucky	Da'Sean Butler	West Virginia	No fourth or fifth teams			
NABC	Scottie Reynolds	Villanova	Robbie Hummel	Purdue	Jimmer Fredette	Brigham Young	No fourth or fifth teams			
NABC	Evan Turner	Ohio State	Jon Scheyer	Duke	Luke Harangody	Notre Dame	No fourth or fifth teams			
NABC	John Wall	Kentucky	Greivis Vasquez	Maryland	Greg Monroe	Georgetown	No fourth or fifth teams			
Sporting News	James Anderson	Oklahoma State	Sherron Collins	Kansas	Jordan Crawford	Xavier	Matt Bouldin	Gonzaga	Austin Freeman	Georgetown
Sporting News	Scottie Reynolds	Villanova	DeMarcus Cousins	Kentucky	Jimmer Fredette	Brigham Young	Tweety Carter	Baylor	Lazar Hayward	Marquette
Sporting News	Evan Turner	Ohio State	Damion James	Texas	Luke Harangody	Notre Dame	Malcolm Delaney	Virginia Tech	Trevon Hughes	Wisconsin
Sporting News	Greivis Vasquez	Maryland	Wesley Johnson	Syracuse	Darington Hobson	New Mexico	Devan Downey	South Carolina	Andy Rautins	Syracuse
Sporting News	John Wall	Kentucky	Jon Scheyer	Duke	Jacob Pullen	Kansas State	Jerome Randle	California	Kyle Singler	Duke

AP Honorable Mention:

- Al-Farouq Aminu, Wake Forest
- Kevin Anderson, Richmond
- Luke Babbitt, Nevada
- Keith Benson, Oakland
- Matt Bouldin, Gonzaga
- Randy Culpepper, UTEP
- Noah Dahlman, Wofford
- Malcolm Delaney, Virginia Tech
- Devan Downey, South Carolina
- Muhammad El-Amin, Stony Brook
- Kenneth Faried, Morehead State
- Alex Franklin, Siena
- Jimmer Fredette, Brigham Young
- Marquez Haynes, Texas-Arlington
- Gordon Hayward, Butler
- Lazar Hayward, Marquette
- Adnan Hodžić, Lipscomb
- Reggie Holmes, Morgan State
- Robbie Hummel, Purdue
- Charles Jenkins, Hofstra
- Garrison Johnson, Jackson State
- Orlando Johnson, UC Santa Barbara
- Tyren Johnson, Louisiana-Lafayette
- Dominique Jones, South Florida
- Adam Koch, Northern Iowa
- David Kool, Western Michigan
- Damian Lillard, Weber State
- Kalin Lucas, Michigan State
- CJ McCollum, Lehigh
- E’Twaun Moore, Purdue
- Artsiom Parakhouski, Radford
- Patrick Patterson, Kentucky
- Quincy Pondexter, Washington
- Jacob Pullen, Kansas State
- Jerome Randle, California
- Andy Rautins, Syracuse
- Justin Rutty, Quinnipiac
- Omar Samhan, Saint Mary's
- Kyle Singler, Duke
- Ekpe Udoh, Baylor
- Jarvis Varnado, Mississippi State
- Hassan Whiteside, Marshall
- Ryan Wittman, Cornell

== Academic All-Americans ==
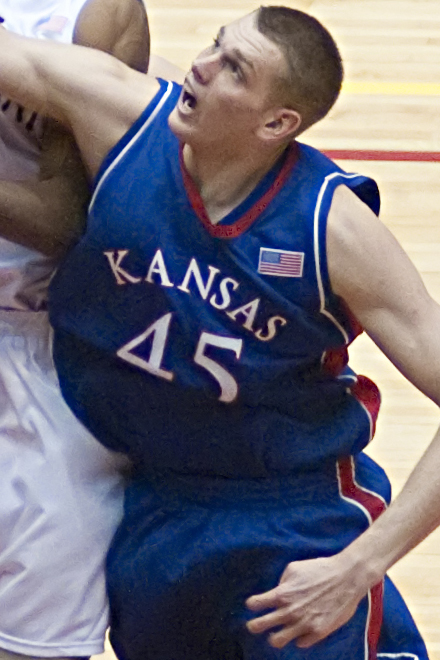
Cole Aldrich

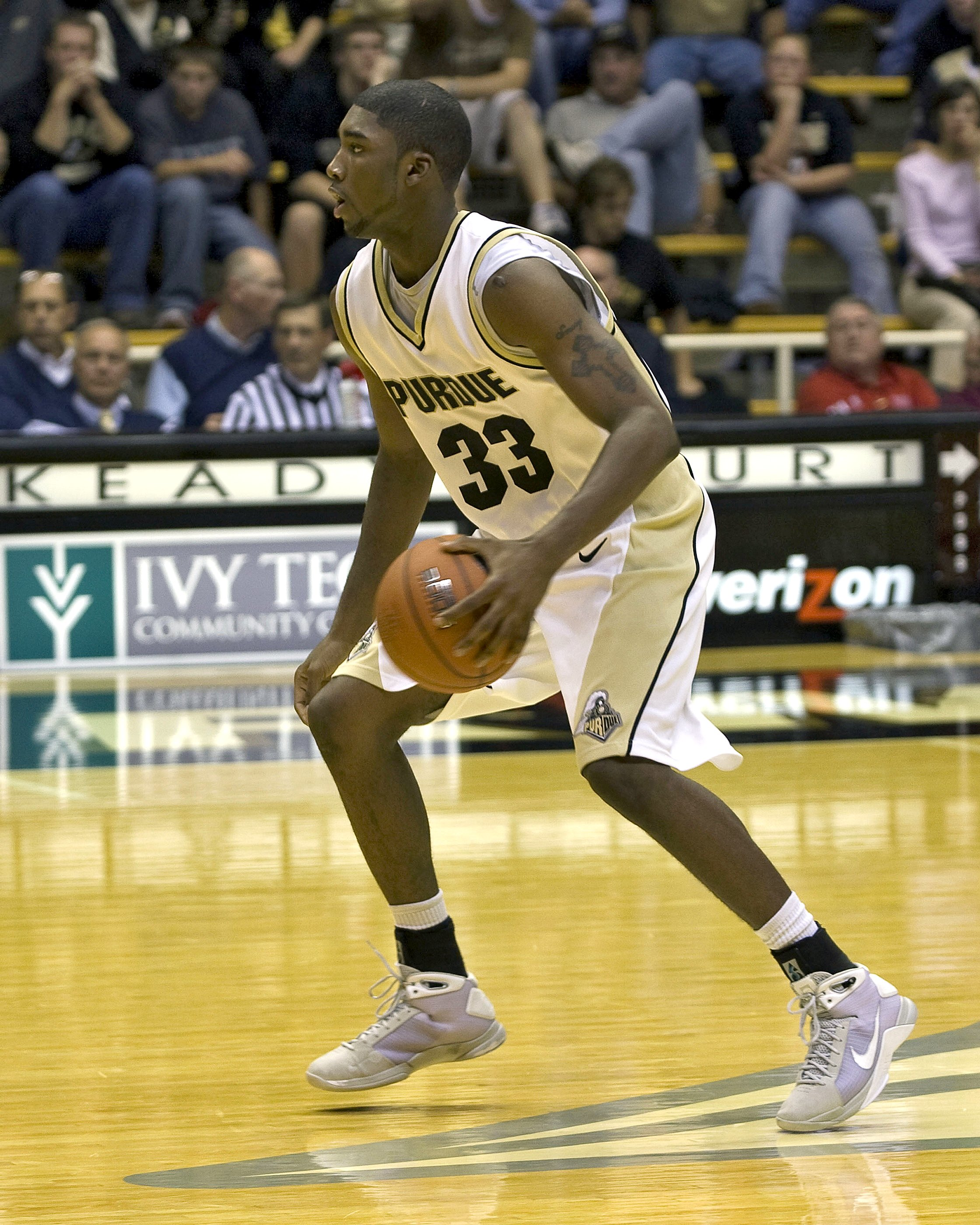
E'Twaun Moore

On February 22, 2010, CoSIDA and ESPN The Magazine announced the 2010 Academic All-America team, with Cole Aldrich headlining the University Division as the men's college basketball Academic All-American of the Year. The following is the 2009–10 ESPN The Magazine Academic All-America Men's Basketball Team (University Division) as selected by CoSIDA:

First Team
Player	School	Class	GPA and major
Cole Aldrich	Kansas	Junior	3.32 Communication studies
Tim Abromaitis	Notre Dame	Junior	3.72 Finance
Patrick Foley	Columbia	Senior	3.87 History
Matt Howard	Butler	Junior	3.77 Finance
Yves Mekongo	La Salle	Senior	3.81 Int. Science, Business & Tech.

Second Team
Player	School	Class	GPA and major
Luke Babbitt	Nevada	Sophomore	3.51 Pre-business Administration
Marc Larson	Bowling Green	Senior	3.97 Engineering Technology
Román Martínez	New Mexico	Senior	3.48 Business Admin./Marketing
E'Twaun Moore	Purdue	Junior	3.30 Org. Leadership & Supervision
Nick Schneiders	South Carolina Upstate	Sophomore	3.71 Graphic Design

Third Team
Player	School	Class	GPA and major
Devon Beitzel	Northern Colorado	Junior	3.72 Finance & Accounting
Graham Hatch	Wichita State	Junior	3.73 Chemistry
Gordon Hayward	Butler	Sophomore	3.31 Computer Engineering
Matthew Mullery	Brown	Senior	3.31 Modern American History
Jake Robinson	Western Carolina	Senior	3.40 Finance

== Wooden All-Americans ==
The ten finalists (and ties) for the John R. Wooden Award are called Wooden All-Americans. The 10 honorees are as follows:

Player	School
James Anderson	Oklahoma State
Da'Sean Butler	West Virginia
Sherron Collins	Kansas
DeMarcus Cousins	Kentucky
Wesley Johnson	Syracuse
Scottie Reynolds	Villanova
Jon Scheyer	Duke
Evan Turner	Ohio State
Greivis Vasquez	Maryland
John Wall	Kentucky

== Senior All-Americans ==
The ten finalists for the Lowe's Senior CLASS Award are called Senior All-Americans. The 10 honorees are as follows:

Player	School
Matt Bouldin	Gonzaga
Da'Sean Butler	West Virginia
Marquis Hall	Lehigh
Luke Harangody	Notre Dame
Damion James	Texas
Adam Koch	Northern Iowa
Chris Kramer	Purdue
Raymar Morgan	Michigan State
Jon Scheyer	Duke
Josh Young	Drake
