= Adam Koch =

American basketball player

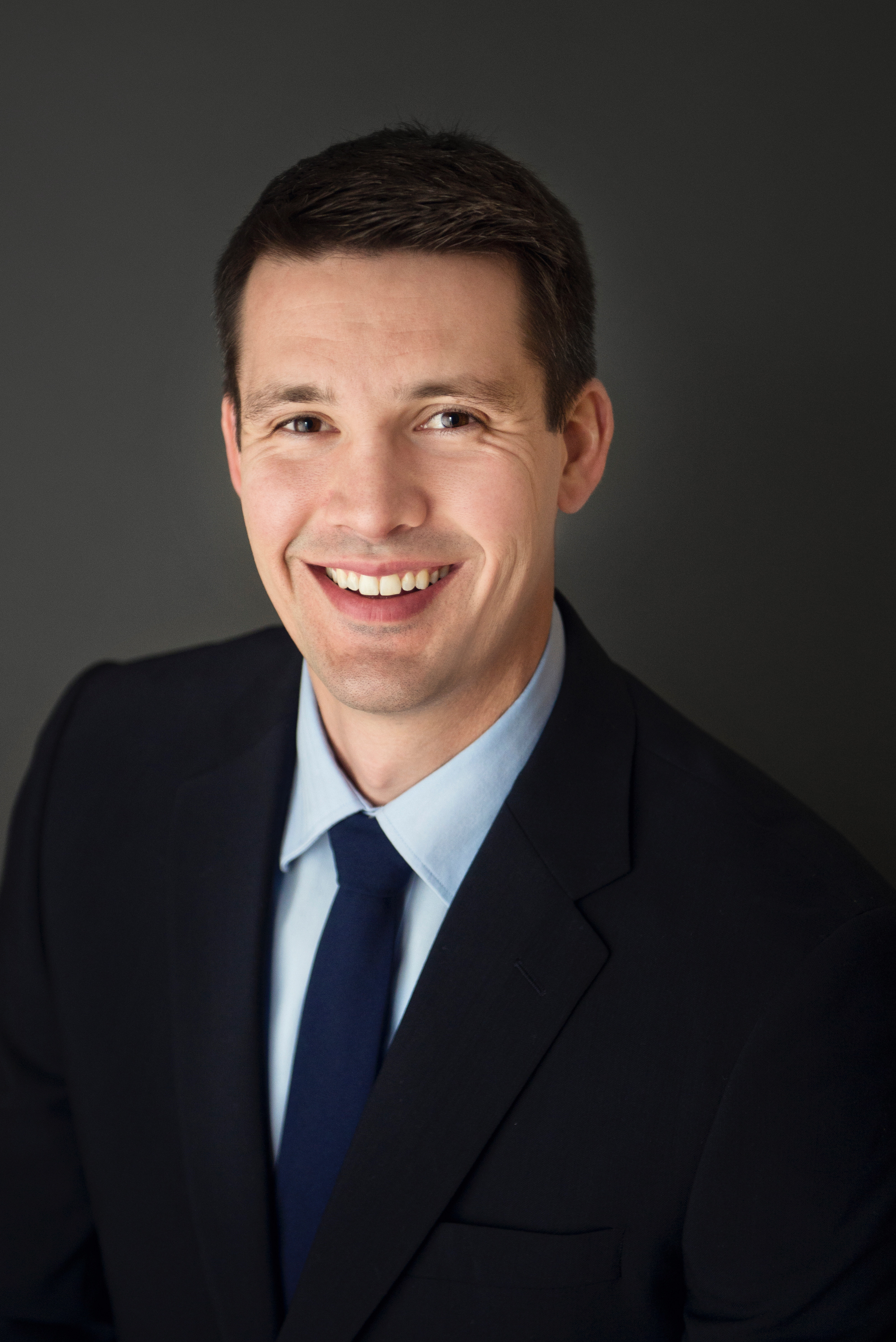

Personal information
- Born: May 4, 1988 (age 38) Ashwaubenon, Wisconsin, U.S.
- Listed height: 6 ft 8 in (2.03 m)
- Listed weight: 255 lb (116 kg)

Career information
- High school: Ashwaubenon (Ashwaubenon, Wisconsin)
- College: Northern Iowa (2006–2010)
- NBA draft: 2010: undrafted
- Playing career: 2010–2013
- Position: Small forward / power forward

Career history
- 2010: ČEZ Nymburk
- 2011–2013: Bakersfield Jam

Career highlights
- AP Honorable mention All-American (2010); MVC Player of the Year (2010); 2x First-team All-MVC (2009, 2010)

Adam Koch (born May 4, 1988) is an American former professional basketball player. He was an All-American player as a collegian at University of Northern Iowa and led the Panthers to a memorable upset of top-seeded Kansas in the 2010 NCAA tournament.

== College career ==
Koch, a 6'8" forward from Ashwaubenon, Wisconsin and graduate of Ashwaubenon High School, played college basketball for coach Ben Jacobson at Northern Iowa from 2006 to 2010. He played a reserve role as a freshman, then started for his last three years. As a junior in the 2008–09 season, Koch averaged 12.1 points and 5.4 rebounds per game while leading the Panthers to a shared Missouri Valley Conference (MVC) regular-season title and a 2009 MVC tournament championship. Koch was named first team all-MVC.

As a senior in 2009–10 season, Koch again led the Panthers to MVC regular season and tournament championships. Koch averaged 11.7 points and 4.9 rebounds and was named MVC Player of the Year. The Panthers entered the 2010 NCAA Tournament as a #9 seed and in the second round defeated the #1 seed Kansas Jayhawks 69–67 to advance to the program's first Sweet 16. At the conclusion of the season, Koch was named an honorable mention All-American by the Associated Press and was a finalist for the Lowe's Senior CLASS Award.

For his career, Koch scored 1,186 points.

== Professional career ==
After going undrafted in the 2010 NBA draft, he joined the Indiana Pacers for the 2010 NBA Summer League. He later signed with ČEZ Nymburk of the Czech Republic. Koch played sparingly, and was ultimately released in December 2010. In February 2011, Koch was acquired by the Bakersfield Jam of the NBA Development League. He played the remainder of the 2010–11 season, averaging 6.2 points and 4.5 rebounds.

In November 2011, he was re-acquired by the Bakersfield Jam. On December 9, 2011, he was signed by the Los Angeles Clippers and was waived after 10 days. In November 2012, he was again re-acquired by the Jam.

== Personal ==
Adam has two younger brothers, Jacob and Bennett, who also played at the University of Northern Iowa. After completing his basketball career he attended Creighton University School of Dentistry and earned his board certification as a General Dentist. He currently practices in Green Bay, Wisconsin.
