= Greivis Vásquez =

Venezuelan basketball player and coach (born 1987)

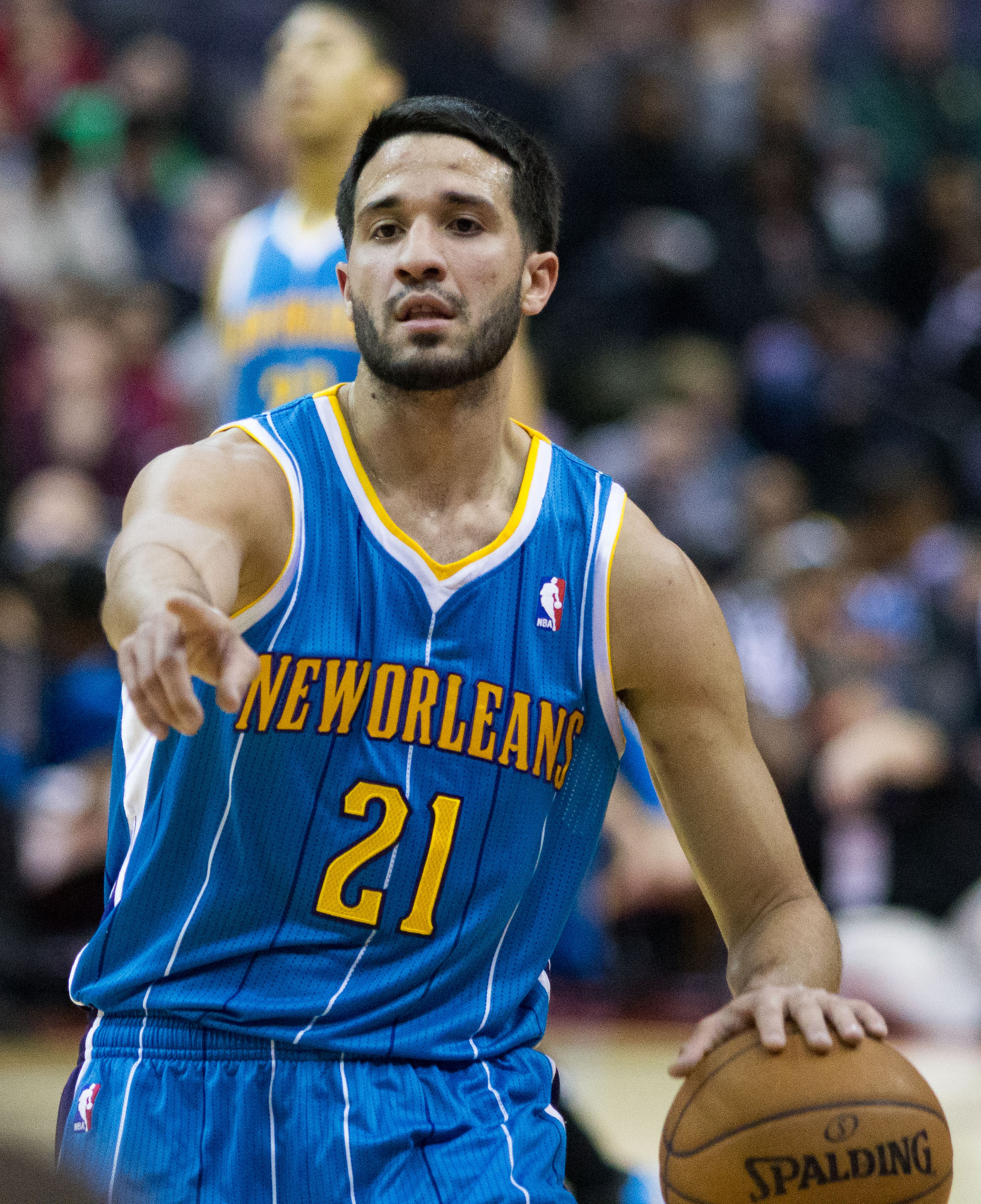
- Vásquez with the New Orleans Hornets in 2013

Personal information
- Born: January 16, 1987 (age 39) Caracas, Venezuela
- Listed height: 6 ft 6 in (1.98 m)
- Listed weight: 217 lb (98 kg)

Career information
- High school: Montrose Christian School (Rockville, Maryland)
- College: Maryland (2006–2010)
- NBA draft: 2010: 1st round, 28th overall pick
- Drafted by: Memphis Grizzlies
- Playing career: 2010–2016
- Position: Point guard / shooting guard
- Number: 21, 10
- Coaching career: 2019–2021

Career history

Playing
- 2010–2011: Memphis Grizzlies
- 2011–2013: New Orleans Hornets
- 2013: Sacramento Kings
- 2013–2015: Toronto Raptors
- 2015–2016: Milwaukee Bucks
- 2016: Brooklyn Nets

Coaching
- 2019–2021: Erie BayHawks (associate HC)

Career highlights
- Consensus second-team All-American (2010); Bob Cousy Award (2010); ACC Player of the Year (2010); First-team All-ACC (2010); 2× Second-team All-ACC (2008, 2009)
- Stats at NBA.com
- Stats at Basketball Reference

Greivis Josué Vásquez Rodríguez (born January 16, 1987) is a Venezuelan former professional basketball player, who spent eight seasons in the NBA. He is currently a coach, most recently working as the associate head coach for the Erie BayHawks of the NBA G League. Vásquez also represented the Venezuela national team in international competitions, as he was born in Caracas and moved to the United States to attend high school at Montrose Christian School in Rockville, Maryland in 2004.

During his senior year at Montrose he committed to the University of Maryland to play under head coach Gary Williams. He was drafted in 2010 after a U.S. college career with Maryland, where he finished second on the Terrapins' all-time scoring list with 2,171 career points.

In 2007, Vásquez played on the Venezuela national basketball team in the FIBA America Championships. In his final college season of 2009–10, he was one of three Venezuelans playing in NCAA Division I men's basketball, with the others being David Cubillan of the Marquette Golden Eagles and Gregory Echenique of the Creighton Bluejays.

== Early life ==
Vásquez grew up in Caracas, Venezuela, where he lived with his parents, Ivis Rodriguez and Gregorio Vásquez, and brother, Ingerman Sanoya. His first name is a portmanteau of his parents' first names. After an impressive youth career in his country where he also led the Venezuelan U-15 National Team to the FIBA U-15 South American Championship title in 2003, he was selected to participate at the NBA's Basketball Without Borders camp (2004) being a headliner at the event.

He started to garner international attention and accepted a scholarship to continue his development in Maryland. At Montrose Christian, Vásquez played under head coach Stu Vetter, and helped the Mustangs post a 43–5 record over his junior and senior seasons. While at Montrose Christian he played for coach Stu Vetter with future NBA star Kevin Durant.

College recruiting
Name	Hometown	School	Height	Weight	Commit date
Greivis Vásquez; SG	Caracas, Venezuela	Montrose Christian School	6 ft 5.25 in (1.96 m)	177 lb (80 kg)	Nov 9, 2005
Greivis Vásquez; SG	Recruit ratings: Scout: Rivals:				
Overall recruit ranking: Scout: NR, 25 (SG) Rivals: 46, 10 (SG)
Note: In many cases, Scout, Rivals, 247Sports, On3, and ESPN may conflict in their listings of height and weight.; In these cases, the average was taken. ESPN grades are on a 100-point scale.; Sources: "2006 Team Ranking". Rivals.

== College career ==
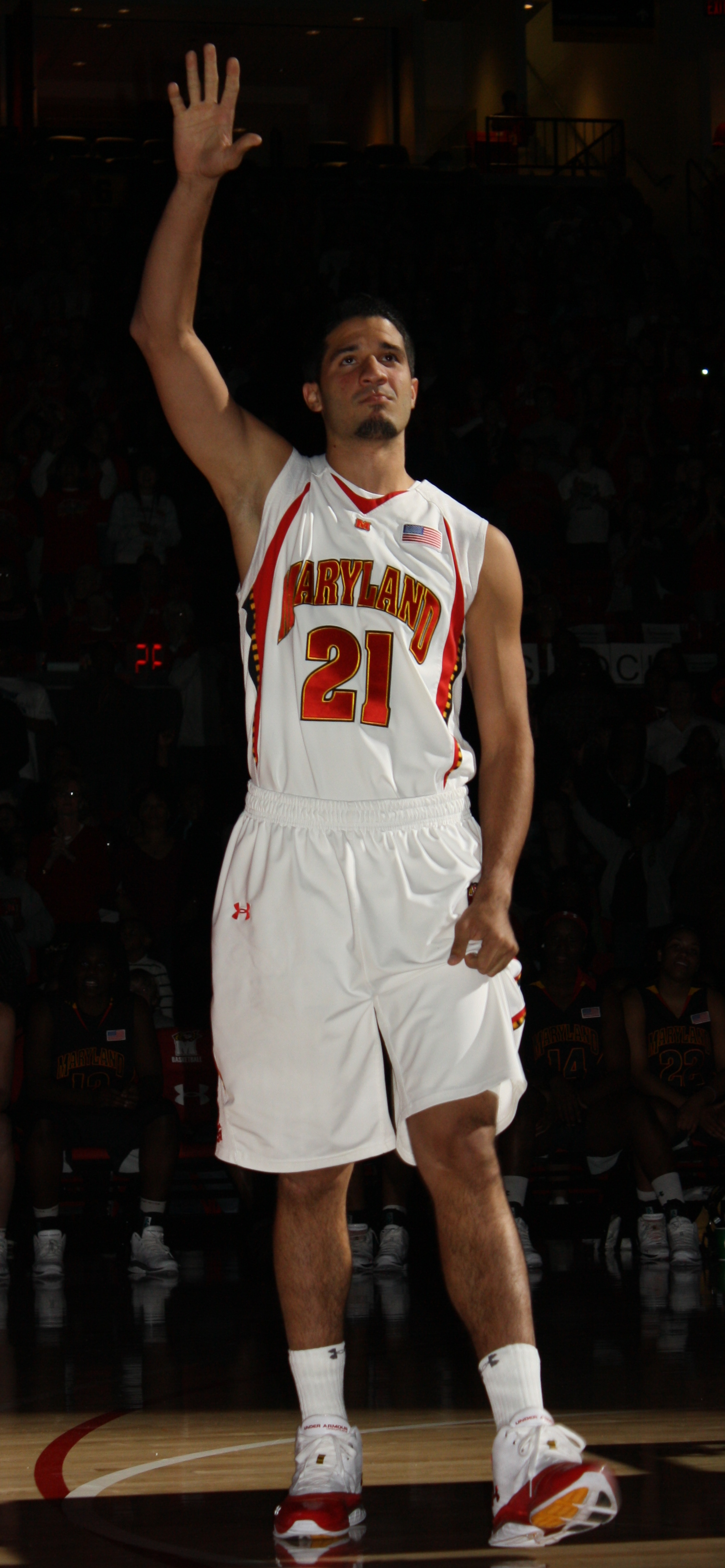
Vásquez introduced during Midnight Madness in 2009

=== Freshman year (2006–07) ===
In the beginning of his freshman year (2006–07), Vásquez did not start for the Terps, but still played solid minutes. Midway through the season, he began starting at the 2 guard position, alongside fellow freshman Eric Hayes at the starting point guard position. He remained a starter for the rest of the season. He heavily contributed to the Terrapins' six-game winning streak at the end of the season, giving Maryland a #4 seed in the NCAA Tournament. Vásquez averaged 9.8 points, 4.7 assists and 3.3 rebounds per game during his freshman season, and shooting percentages of 44.4 for field goals, 31.6 for three-pointers and 79.8 for free throws.

=== Sophomore year (2007–08) ===
Vásquez had per-game averages of 17 points, 6.8 assists and 5.7 rebounds, and shooting percentages of 43.2 for field goals, 30.9 for three-pointers and 78.2 for free throws.

=== Junior year (2008–09) ===
As a junior, Vásquez led the Terrapins in scoring (17.5), rebounds (5.4), assists (5.0), steals (1.4), and minutes (34.6) per game. He became the first Terrapin basketball player to ever lead the team in points, rebounds and assists in a single season, and only the sixth to accomplish that task in the ACC. On February 21, 2009, Vásquez registered a then career-high 35 points, and 11 rebounds and 10 assists—Maryland's third triple-double in history and the first since 1987—in a come-from-behind 88–85 overtime win over North Carolina. At the end of his junior year, Vásquez ranked seventh in scoring, third in free throw percentage (.867), third in assists per game, third in assist-to-turnover ratio (1.80) and fifth in minutes per game in the ACC. He reached double figures in scoring in 57 of his last 61 games, including each of his last 17. In Maryland's final ten games, he recorded five 20-point games. Vásquez was named to the All-ACC second team at the close of the regular season.

After the season, Vásquez participated in NBA workouts, where he received mostly positive feedback from professional scouts. He twice met with coach Gary Williams and his Montrose Christian coach, Stu Vetter, to discuss his future. Three hours before the deadline, Vásquez withdrew his name from the NBA draft in order to return to Maryland for his senior season. Williams said, "He talked to about 14 or 15 teams and really got a good feel for his situation. I think he's made a great move. He returns as possibly the best guard in the ACC and one of the best guards in the country."

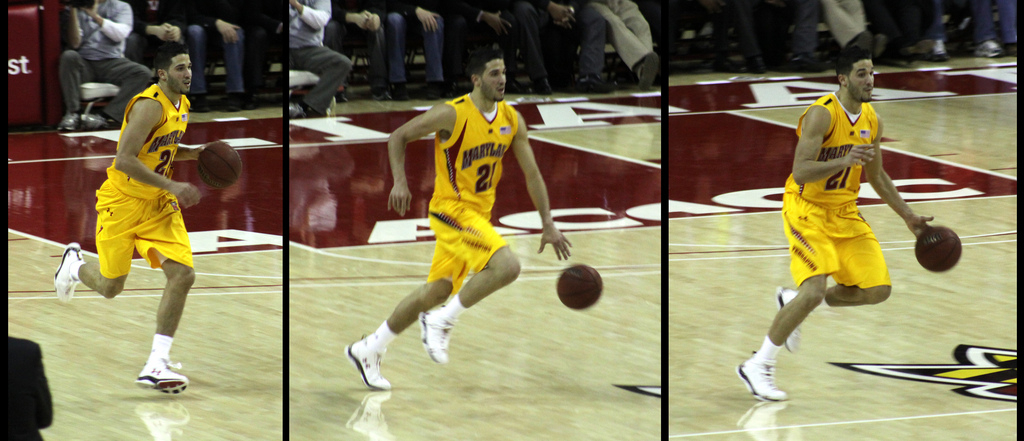
Greivis Vásquez brings the ball upcourt during the Terrapins' 88–85 victory over North Carolina on February 21, 2009. Vasquez had 35 points, 11 rebounds and 10 assists in the game.

=== Senior year (2009–10) ===
As a senior, Vásquez averaged 19.6 points, 6.3 assists, 4.6 rebounds and 1.7 steals per game over 33 games. Vásquez was the only player in the country to average more than 18 points and 6 assists per game. His honors included the 2010 Bob Cousy Award given by the Naismith Memorial Basketball Hall of Fame to the nation's best collegiate point guard, for which he edged out Sherron Collins (Kansas), Scottie Reynolds (Villanova), Jon Scheyer (Duke), Evan Turner (Ohio State) and John Wall (Kentucky).

Against Georgia Tech on February 20, 2010, Vásquez scored the 2,000th point of his collegiate career, making him the only player in ACC history to compile at least 2,000 points, 700 assists and 600 rebounds. The following week, Vásquez set a new career scoring high with 41 points in the Terrapins' double-overtime victory at Virginia Tech. Vásquez also scored 20 points in Maryland's home win over Duke on Senior Night, and made several critical baskets and assists in the final minutes to secure a victory. Vásquez helped lead Maryland to a 13–3 conference record to tie Duke for the regular season ACC championship. He was named a unanimous first-team All-ACC selection on March 8, 2010, and the ACC Player of the Year on March 9, 2010, beating out Duke's Jon Scheyer and Virginia Tech's Malcolm Delaney. Vásquez also won three ACC Player of the Week honors in his final season, which brought his career total to seven. Vásquez was named a consensus second-team All-American.

=== NCAA career statistics ===
Legend
GP	Games played	GS	Games started	MPG	Minutes per game
FG%	Field goal percentage	3P%	3-point field goal percentage	FT%	Free throw percentage
RPG	Rebounds per game	APG	Assists per game	SPG	Steals per game
BPG	Blocks per game	PPG	Points per game	**Bold**	Career high

Year	Team	GP	GS	MPG	FG%	3P%	FT%	RPG	APG	SPG	BPG	PPG
2006–07	Maryland	34	22	28.8	**.444**	.316	.798	3.3	4.6	1.1	.1	9.8
2007–08	Maryland	34	34	**37.0**	.432	.309	.782	**5.7**	**6.8**	1.4	.3	17.0
2008–09	Maryland	**35**	**35**	34.6	.405	.327	**.867**	5.4	5.0	1.4	**.4**	17.5
2009–10	Maryland	33	32	33.9	.429	**.359**	.857	4.6	6.3	**1.7**	**.4**	**19.6**
	**Career**	136	123	33.6	.425	.329	.828	4.8	5.7	1.4	.3	16.0

== Professional career ==
=== Memphis Grizzlies (2010–2011) ===
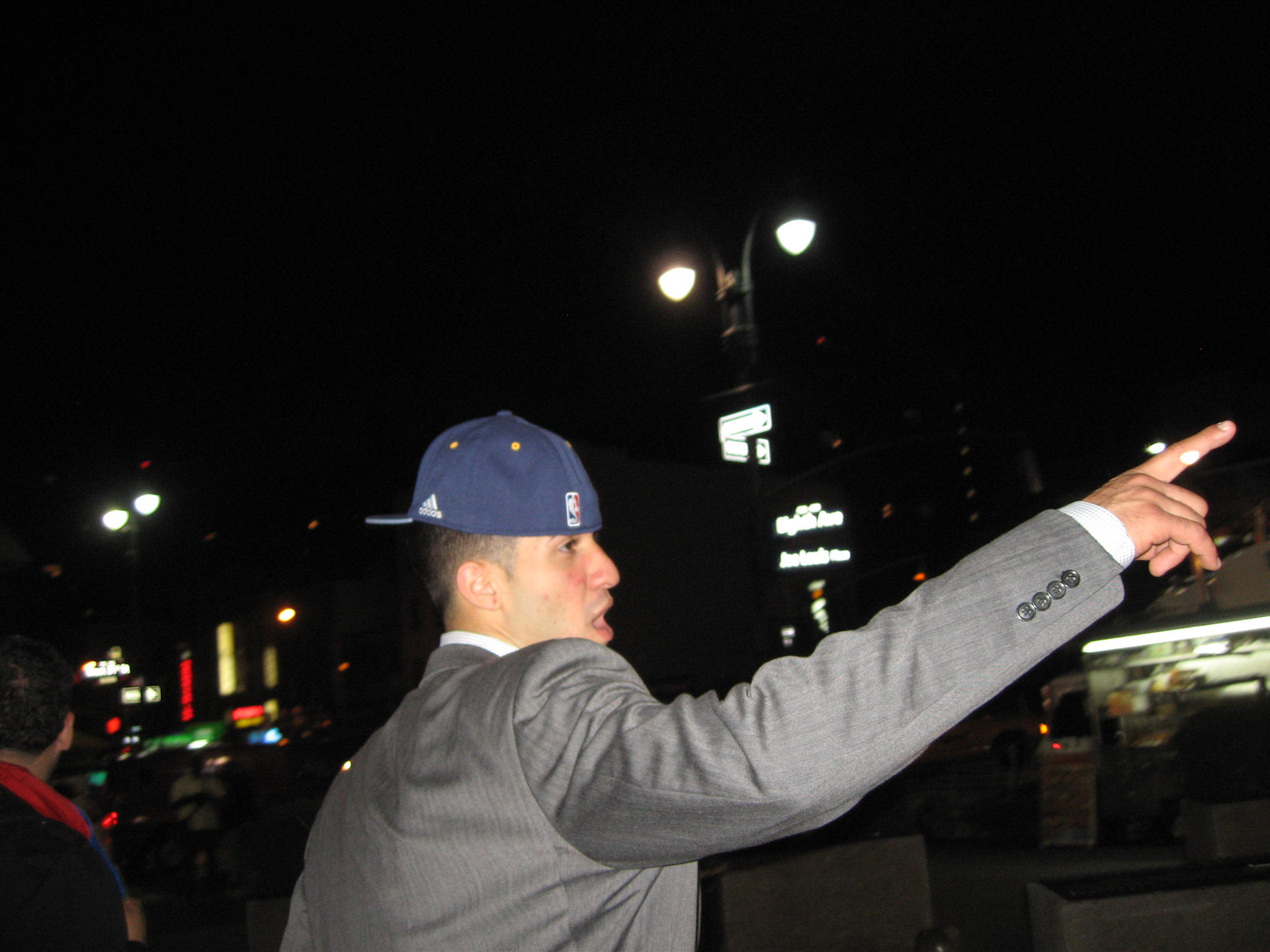
Vásquez after being selected in the 2010 NBA draft

The Memphis Grizzlies selected Vásquez with the 28th pick in the first round of the 2010 NBA draft, using one of the picks traded from the Los Angeles Lakers via the Pau Gasol trade. Throughout the regular season of his rookie year, Vásquez received spot minutes and scored in double digits only twice, but he gained extensive playing time in the 2011 NBA Playoffs.

Memphis faced the first-seeded San Antonio Spurs in the first round, where the Grizzlies won their first postseason game in franchise history. In Game Four, Vásquez substituted for starting point guard Mike Conley Jr., who had gotten into foul trouble. During his 13 minutes of playing time, he had nine points and two assists as Memphis won, 104–86.

Memphis advanced to meet the four-seeded Oklahoma City Thunder in the Conference Semifinals, where Vásquez faced off with his former Montrose Christian classmate, Kevin Durant. The Thunder would win the series.

In the 2011 offseason, Vásquez took part in a United States State Department sponsored trip to his native Venezuela to hold clinics and meet with sports officials.

=== New Orleans Hornets (2011–2013) ===
On December 24, 2011, Vásquez was traded to the New Orleans Hornets in exchange for Quincy Pondexter.

On February 1, 2012, against the Phoenix Suns, Vasquez recorded 20 points and 12 assists off the bench. Vasquez received his first set of starts for the Hornets after a sore knee injury to Hornets guard Jarrett Jack.

Vasquez received the starting job as point guard for the Hornets in the 2012–13 NBA season. On November 23, 2012, Vasquez tallied 25 points and 14 assists (both career highs) in a loss to the Phoenix Suns.

On January 1, 2013, Vasquez earned Western Conference Player of the Week honors.

On February 8, 2013, in the game against the Atlanta Hawks, Vasquez scored 21 points, along with 12 assists and 11 rebounds to secure his first career NBA triple-double.

Vasquez finished the 2012–13 season as the league leader in total assists, with 704, and finished second in voting for the NBA Most Improved Player award.

=== Sacramento Kings (2013) ===
On July 10, 2013, Vasquez was traded to the Sacramento Kings in a three-team deal that also involved the Portland Trail Blazers.

=== Toronto Raptors (2013–2015) ===
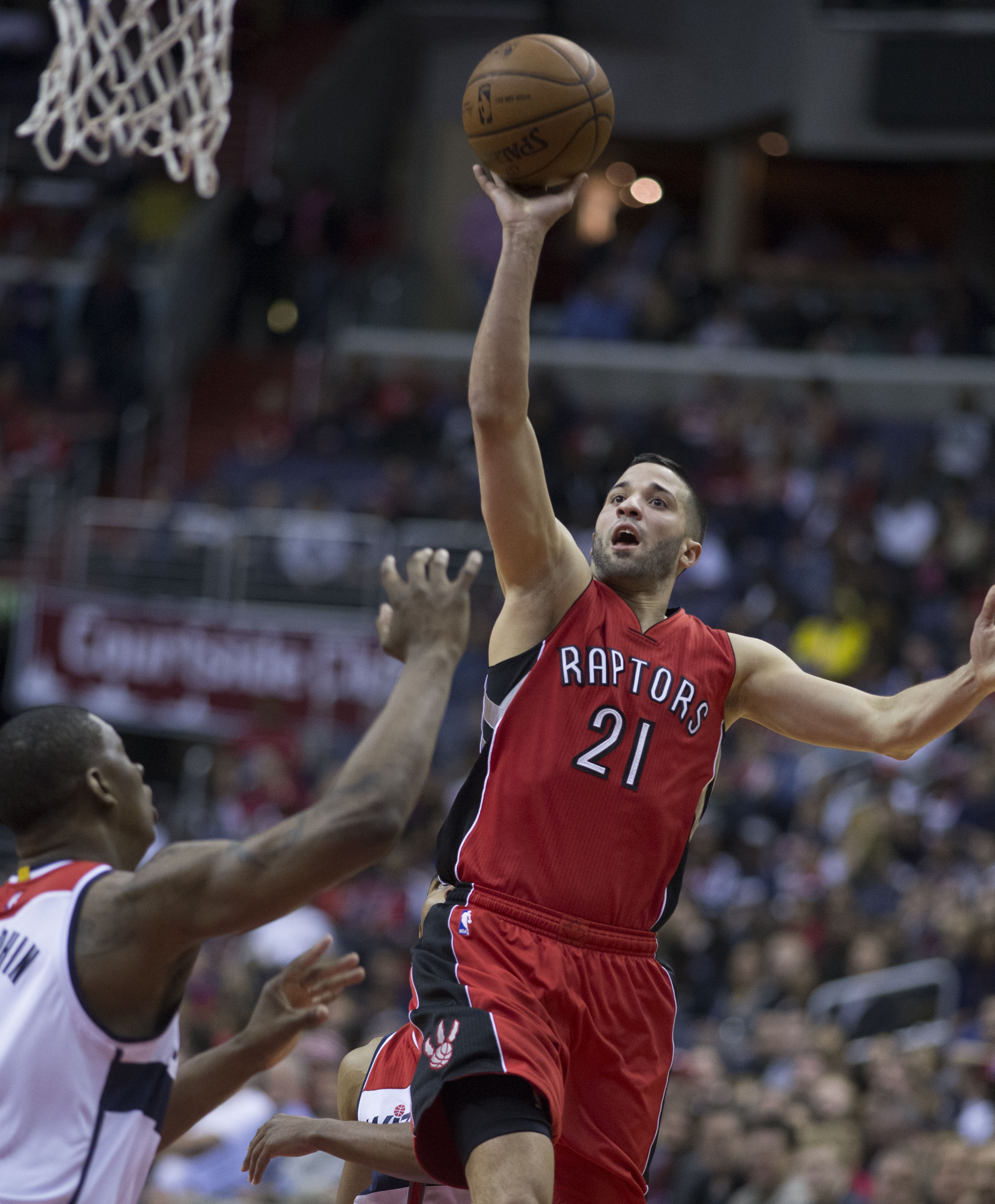
Vásquez with the Raptors in April 2015.

On December 9, 2013, the Kings traded Vásquez, along with Patrick Patterson, John Salmons, and Chuck Hayes to the Toronto Raptors for Rudy Gay, Quincy Acy, and Aaron Gray.

On July 17, 2014, Vásquez re-signed with the Raptors to a reported two-year, $13 million contract. On April 18, 2015, Vásquez hit a game tying three-pointer with 25 seconds left in Game 1 of the Eastern Conference quarter-finals.

=== Milwaukee Bucks (2015–2016) ===
On June 25, 2015, Vásquez was traded to the Milwaukee Bucks in exchange for the draft rights to Norman Powell and a protected 2017 first-round pick. He made his debut for the Bucks in the team's season opener against the New York Knicks on October 28, recording 15 points, 7 rebounds and 5 assists in a 122–97 loss. On December 15, he underwent successful surgery to remove a bone spur and loose bodies from his right ankle. He was subsequently ruled out for three to four months.

=== Brooklyn Nets (2016) ===
On July 13, 2016, Vásquez signed with the Brooklyn Nets. On November 9, 2016, he was waived by the Nets after appearing in three games.

== Venezuela's National Team career ==
After winning at the U-15 level in 2003, Vásquez was called up for the U-21 Venezuelan NT for the 2004 U-21 Americas Tournament being four years under the tournament's age. Those were his only appearances on the youth national team setup.

Vásquez made his Senior National Team debut in 2007 during the 2007 FIBA Americas Championship in Las Vegas while being a sophomore at the University of Maryland. He was the second leading scorer of his squad averaging 12.1 points per game, third in rebounds with 4.1 per game and second best in assists with 3.3 Ast per contest. Venezuela finished 8th (2–6 record) out of 10 ten participating teams.

His ascent was headlined during the 2011 FIBA Americas Championship, where he carried the Venezuelan team to a 5th-place finish. Already an NBA player, Vásquez was the second best scorer of the tournament with 19.3 PPG and first in assists with 5.8 APG.

== Coaching career ==
On August 15, 2019, the New Orleans Pelicans announced that Vásquez would serve as the associate head coach for the Erie BayHawks.

== NBA career statistics ==
Legend
GP	Games played	GS	Games started	MPG	Minutes per game
FG%	Field goal percentage	3P%	3-point field goal percentage	FT%	Free throw percentage
RPG	Rebounds per game	APG	Assists per game	SPG	Steals per game
BPG	Blocks per game	PPG	Points per game	**Bold**	Career high
*	Led the league

=== Regular season ===
Year	Team	GP	GS	MPG	FG%	3P%	FT%	RPG	APG	SPG	BPG	PPG
2010–11	Memphis	70	1	12.3	.408	.291	.733	1.0	2.2	.3	.1	3.6
2011–12	New Orleans	66*	26	25.8	.430	.319	.821	2.6	5.4	**.9**	.1	8.9
2012–13	New Orleans	78	**78**	**34.4**	**.433**	.342	.805	**4.3**	**9.0**	.8	.1	**13.9**
2013–14	Sacramento	18	18	25.8	**.433**	.320	**.938**	1.9	5.3	.3	.1	9.8
2013–14	Toronto	61	5	21.5	.417	**.389**	.855	2.3	3.7	.4	.1	9.5
2014–15	Toronto	**82**	29	24.3	.408	.379	.758	2.6	3.7	.6	.1	9.5
2015–16	Milwaukee	23	0	20.0	.326	.247	.846	2.0	4.0	.4	.0	5.7
2016–17	Brooklyn	3	0	13.0	.250	.333	.667	.7	1.7	.3	**.3**	2.3
Career		401	157	23.7	.418	.349	.817	2.5	4.8	.6	.1	9.0

=== Playoffs ===
Year	Team	GP	GS	MPG	FG%	3P%	FT%	RPG	APG	SPG	BPG	PPG
2011	Memphis	**13**	0	10.9	**.512**	.364	.769	1.5	1.9	.4	**.2**	4.3
2014	Toronto	7	0	**27.1**	.422	**.370**	.778	**3.7**	**5.1**	**.6**	.1	**10.1**
2015	Toronto	4	0	25.3	.379	.357	**1.000**	1.8	3.0	.5	.0	7.5
Career		24	0	18.0	.440	.365	.800	2.2	3.0	.5	.1	6.5
