= Scottie Reynolds =

American basketball player

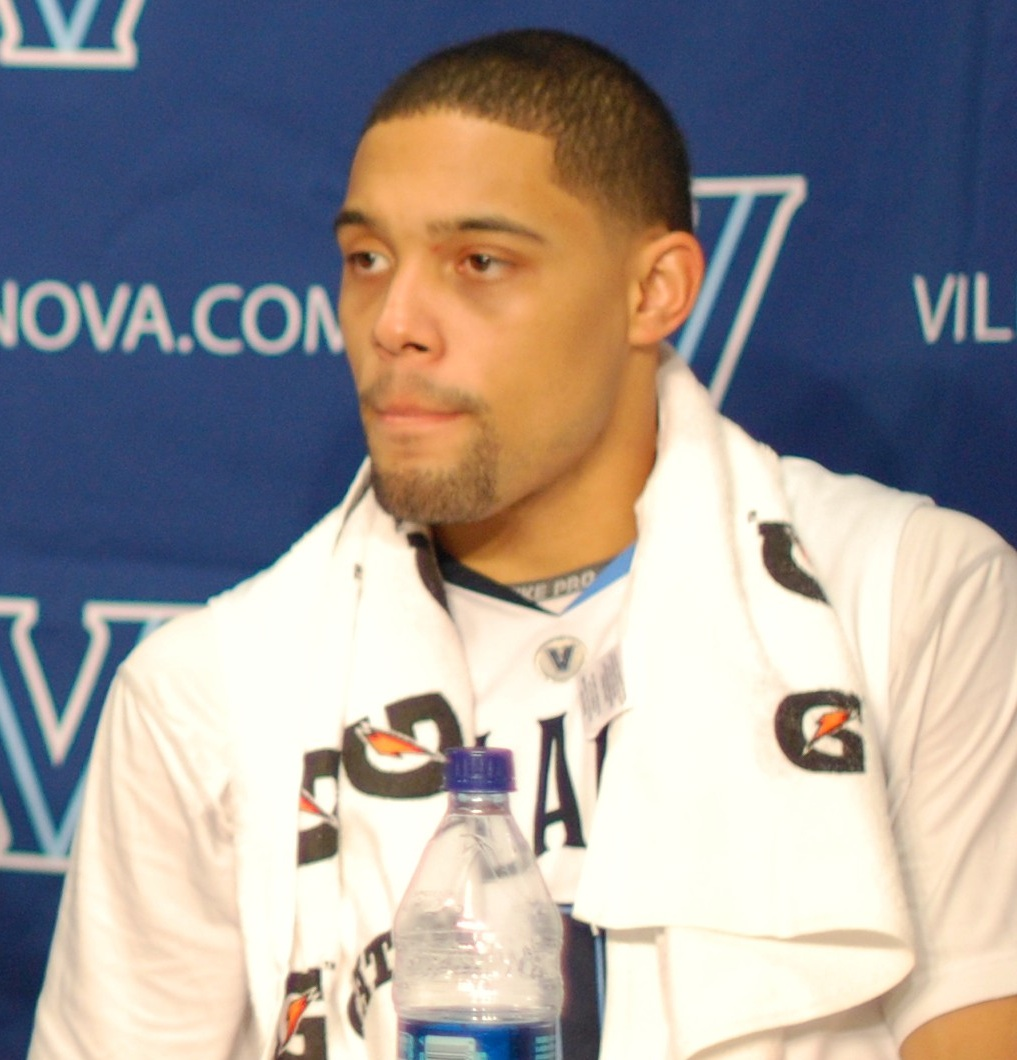
- Reynolds with Villanova in 2009

Free Agent
- Position: Point guard

Personal information
- Born: October 10, 1987 (age 39) Huntsville, Alabama, U.S.
- Listed height: 185 cm (6 ft 1 in)
- Listed weight: 87 kg (192 lb)

Career information
- High school: Herndon (Herndon, Virginia)
- College: Villanova (2006–2010)
- NBA draft: 2010: undrafted
- Playing career: 2010–present

Career history
- 2010: Prima Veroli
- 2010–2011: Springfield Armor
- 2011: Talk 'N Text Tropang Texters
- 2012: Antalya Büyükşehir Belediyesi
- 2012–2013: New Basket Brindisi
- 2013: ČEZ Nymburk
- 2013–2014: Hapoel Holon
- 2014–2015: Krasnye Krylia
- 2015: Beşiktaş
- 2015–2016: Enel Brindisi
- 2016: Hapoel Holon
- 2016–2017: Cibona
- 2017–2018: Zenit Saint Petersburg
- 2018: Petrol Olimpija
- 2019: Hapoel Holon
- 2019: Larisa
- 2019–2020: SIG Strasbourg
- 2020–2021: Cibona
- 2021–2022: Champagne Châlons-Reims
- 2022–2023: Stal Ostrów Wielkopolski
- 2023: Mitteldeutscher BC

Career highlights
- Adriatic League assists leader (2017); Consensus first-team All-American (2010); First-team All-Big East (2010); 2× Second-team All-Big East (2007, 2008); Robert V. Geasey Trophy (2010); Big East Rookie of the Year (2007); Big East All-Rookie Team (2007); McDonald's All-American (2006); Third-team Parade All-American (2006)

Scottie Reynolds (born October 10, 1987) is an American professional basketball player. Prior to his professional career he played college basketball for Villanova. Reynolds also competed with the United States national team in the 2007 Pan American Games.

== Early life ==
Reynolds was born in Huntsville, Alabama to a teenage mother who reluctantly gave him up for adoption. Reynolds grew up in a loving family with his adoptive parents Rick and Pam Reynolds and siblings Eric, Kelli, Susie, Ross, and Dahlia. He has lived in Athens, Alabama, Herndon, Virginia, and Chicago, Illinois. He attended Herndon High School in Herndon, Virginia.

== High school career ==
Reynolds was a four-year starter for Herndon High School in Herndon, Virginia. He was the best player in the competitive Northern Region since Grant Hill. He led the Herndon Hornets to a state finals runner-up place in 2005–06. Averaging 40 points per game, he was a three-time Virginia Player of the Year.

During his senior year, Reynolds was named a McDonald's All-American, the first player in the Northern Region to be so honored since Joey Beard (South Lakes High School, Class of 1993). He was also a third-team Parade All-American. Reynolds owns many Herndon Hornets basketball records, including most points in a year, most points during a high school career, and most points in a game with 53 against I. C. Norcom High School in 2005. Reynolds is 16th all-time in Virginia high school career scoring. He was at one point ranked the fourth best point guard in the nation. Reynolds averaged 28.4 points per game, 4.5 assists per game, and 4.0 steals per game as a senior, and 34.7 points as a junior.

== College career ==
He signed a letter of intent to play for Oklahoma but was released by the university after their coach Kelvin Sampson left. He was then recruited by Jay Wright of Villanova, playing in the Big East Conference of the NCAA.

As a Villanova Wildcat, he became the Wildcats' primary scoring threat by the end of his freshman year, scoring 40 points against the University of Connecticut on February 28, 2007. Reynolds was named the 2006–07 Big East Rookie of the Year.

Villanova made the Sweet 16 in the 2008 NCAA Tournament during Reynolds' sophomore season before losing to eventual champion Kansas. He led the team in scoring with 15.9 points per game.

During his Junior season, he was 2nd on the team with 15.2 PPG in leading Villanova to a 26–7 record and a #3 Seed in the 2009 NCAA Tournament. During Villanova's Elite Eight matchup versus #1 seed Pittsburgh in the Tournament, Reynolds made a game-winning shot with 0.5 seconds to go to send Nova to the 2009 Final Four in Detroit.

On April 21, 2009, Reynolds declared for the 2009 NBA draft, but did not hire an agent. He withdrew from the draft on June 9, 2009.

On January 11, 2010, Reynolds scored a season-high 36 points on 5-of-5 three-pointers in a 92–84 win over Louisville.

As a senior in the 2009–10 season, the 6-foot, 2-inch Reynolds averaged 18.5 points and shot 40 percent from 3-point range in becoming the Wildcats' go-to player with several spectacular second-half efforts. He led the Wildcats to a 25–8 season (13–5 in the Big East) and a #2 seed in the NCAA tournament, which culminated with a 75–68 loss to St. Mary's (CA) in the second round of the 2010 NCAA Tournament. Reynolds ended his career as the second-leading scorer in Villanova history, with 2,222 points, falling only 21 points short of breaking Kerry Kittles's all-time record. He finished his college career with 472 assists and 203 steals.

Reynolds was named to the 2010 AP All-American 1st team, joining Randy Foye (2006), Kerry Kittles (1996) and Paul Arizin (1950) as the only Villanova players to become 1st team All-Americans. "You go through a season not expecting to get All-American," Reynolds said. "You just go out there every day and try and do the best you can, try and play Villanova basketball. It's in the back of your head, but if you concentrate on that, that stuff will never come." Villanova Coach Jay Wright often referred to Scottie Reynolds as the "face of Villanova Basketball" during his 4 years on the team.

== Professional career ==
Scottie Reynolds was the first AP All-American to not be selected in the NBA Draft since the NBA-ABA merger in 1976.

He was signed by the Phoenix Suns to participate in their 2010 summer league. Reynolds played three games on the Suns' summer league squad and played with them in training camp. He averaged 10.3 points and 4.7 assists in the Suns' final three games of summer-league play after missing the first two with an Achilles injury.

On August 1, 2010, Reynolds agreed on a one-year deal with Italian club Prima Veroli.

On October 26, 2010, it was announced that Reynolds was leaving Veroli after averaging 12.3 points, 2.5 assists and 2.3 steals to return to the US.

On November 1, 2010, Reynolds was drafted 13th overall by the Tulsa 66ers of the NBA Development League. He was traded the next day to the Springfield Armor. On November 26, 2010, Reynolds scored 30 points and made the game winning three-pointer with 0.2 seconds left to give the Armor the 88–85 victory. On February 19, 2011, Reynolds and the East won the NBA D-league All-star game.

On July 22, 2011, Reynolds played his first game with Talk 'N Text.

On December 14, 2011, Reynolds signed with the Utah Jazz, he was waived without playing a game.

On January 10, 2012, Reynolds signed with Antalya Metropolitan Municipality in Turkey.

In August 2012, he signed a contract with New Basket Brindisi in the Italian first division.

On July 16, 2013, Reynolds signed with ČEZ Basketball Nymburk.

On January 22, 2015, he signed with Beşiktaş of the Turkish Basketball League.

Reynolds returned to New Basket Brindisi in July 2015, signing a one-year deal.

On October 30, 2016, he signed with Cibona for the 2016–17 season.

On July 10, 2017, Reynolds signed with Russian club Zenit Saint Petersburg for the 2017–18 season.

On October 10, 2018, Reynolds signed with Slovenian club Petrol Olimpija for the 2018–19 season.

On January 4, 2019, Reynolds returned to Hapoel Holon for a third stint, signing as an injury cover for Khalif Wyatt.

On September 4, 2019, Reynolds signed with newly promoted Greek Basket League club Larisa. On November 17, 2019, Reynolds parted ways with the Greek team.

On November 18, 2019, he has signed with SIG Strasbourg of the LNB Pro A. Reynolds averaged 10.1 points, 2.9 rebounds and 6.2 assists per game. He returned to Cibona of the ABA League and the Croatian League on December 3, 2020.

On August 30, 2021, he signed with Champagne Châlons-Reims of the French LNB Pro A.

On October 26, 2022, he has signed with Stal Ostrów Wielkopolski of the Polish Basketball League (PLK).

On January 19, 2023, he has signed with Mitteldeutscher BC of the Basketball Bundesliga.

== The Basketball Tournament (TBT) ==
In the summer of 2017, Reynolds competed in The Basketball Tournament on ESPN for Supernova; a team composed of Villanova University basketball alumni. In two games, he averaged 10.0 points, 4.0 rebounds and 3.5 assists per game to help number two seeded Supernova advance to the second-round where they were defeated 82–74 by Team Fancy. Reynolds also competed for Supernova in 2016 and, prior to that, averaged 25.5 points per game for Team Roby in 2014.
