= Untimed play =

In sports that use a clock, untimed play is play in which the clock does not tick. In some cases, untimed play can occur at the end of a game following the expiration of the clock, and may even be when a score occurs that decides the outcome of the game.

== Gridiron football ==
In gridiron football, untimed play occurs in the following situations:

- Extra points following touchdowns are attempted without the clock ticking (except in arena football, which uses a continuously running clock except in the last minute of a half)
- If the clock expires while a play is in progress, the play continues untimed until the ball is dead
- If, at the end of a quarter or a half, a defensive foul occurs, the offense is entitled to an untimed down
- Specifically in Canadian football, if the clock expires while the ball is dead, play continues with one untimed down. (This is in contrast to American football, where if the ball is dead and time expires, the quarter immediately ends.)
- In leagues that use the Kansas playoff for overtime (including Canadian, college and most high school football), all overtime play is untimed.
- In the NFL, field goal attempts—unless they land in the field of play—are limited to five seconds. Should such a field goal attempt take longer than five seconds to complete, the excess will be untimed.
- Also in the NFL, kickoffs and safety kicks are untimed unless, and until, the receiving team attempts to return the kick. For example, on September 14, 2025, the Seattle Seahawks scored a key touchdown on an untimed play when they kicked off and then recovered in the end zone before the receiving team, the Pittsburgh Steelers, were able to attempt a return.
- In the NFL, an untimed fair catch kick for a possible field goal is permitted if time expires during the play on which a fair catch is made.

All untimed downs are subject to the play clock and must commence before it expires, or else a delay of game penalty is levied.

== Basketball ==
In basketball, untimed play occurs in the following situations:

- Free throws are shot without the clock ticking, though in the NBA, there is a 10-second clock to shoot a free throw or else it is forfeited.
- At the end of the game, the buzzer automatically ends the game. However, if a player has released the ball from his hands before the buzzer sounds and the ball makes it through the basket, the score counts.
- When the ball is put in play by being inbounded, the play is untimed until touched by a player on the court. The player on the court closest to the ball will sometimes take advantage of this by delaying touching the ball for as long as possible by high-bouncing or rolling the ball down the court towards their teammate, buying his or her team a bit more time to shoot before the shot clock or game clock expires.
- In 3x3, a formalized version of the 3-on-3 halfcourt game, overtime is untimed. The game ends by rule once either team scores 2 points in overtime, with shots from behind the "three-point" arc worth 2 points and all other shots (whether field goals or free throws) worth 1 point.
- The Basketball Tournament, an annual offseason event in the U.S., uses the Elam Ending, an untimed end-of-game procedure, in all games. In the TBT implementation, the game clock proceeds normally until the first dead ball with 4:00 or less remaining in the fourth quarter. At that point, a "target score" is set by adding 8 points (originally 7; increased in 2019) to the score of the leading team. The game then resumes, with the shot clock fully operational but the game clock shut off. The first team to reach or exceed the target score wins the game.

== Ice hockey ==
In hockey, mid-game penalty shots and post-game shootouts are untimed.

== Association football ==
In football, the game clock is not stopped when the play is interrupted and a game does not automatically end when the allocated time has expired. Instead, it is up the referee's discretion to add as much additional time at the end as they deem necessary. When a team receives a penalty kick the referee is required to allow additional time for the kick to be taken and completed. If a goal is not scored from the kick, the play is considered complete if the ball has stopped moving or left the field of play and if the ball is touched by any player other than the defensive goalkeeper. If the kick is missed but the defensive team commits an offence that would allow a retake, more additional time will be allowed to retake the kick.

Kick offs, throw-ins, goal kicks, corner kicks and free kicks are not given any allocation of time specifically for the restart to be taken and there is no requirement in the laws of the game to allow a promising attack to continue or to wait until the ball is in "neutral" territory or out of play. This means a game can end when the ball is out of play if the referee's minimum added time has been reached, or to finish just after a team has kicked or thrown the ball for a restart. This lack of additional time has proven controversial in situations where a team is trying to score a goal late in a game only to be denied by a whistle. An example of this took place in the 1978 FIFA World Cup when Brazil appeared to have scored from a corner kick in the final seconds to win the match against Sweden 2-1, only for referee Clive Thomas to have blown the full time whistle as soon as the corner had been taken. In modern practice referees are encouraged not to blow for time if a team has won a free kick or corner kick without letting them attempt to shoot or cross the ball for a goal attempt.
