= List of Saginaw Valley State Cardinals head football coaches =

The Saginaw Valley State Cardinals football program is a college football team that represents Saginaw Valley State University in the Great Lakes Intercollegiate Athletic Conference, a part of NCAA Division II. The team has had eight head coaches since its first recorded football game in 1975. The current coach is Michael Engle who took the position prior to the 2026 season.

== Key ==
Key to symbols in coaches list
General		Overall		Conference		Postseason (Note: Although the first Rose Bowl Game was played in 1902, it has been continuously played since the 1916 game, and is recognized as the oldest bowl game by the NCAA. "—" indicates any season prior to 1916 when postseason games were not played.)	
No.	Order of coaches (Note: A running total of the number of head coaches, with coaches who served separate tenures being counted only once. Interim head coaches are represented with "Int" and are not counted in the running total. "—" indicates the team played but either without a coach or no coach is on record. "X" indicates an interim year without play.)	GC	Games coached	CW	Conference wins	PW	Postseason wins
DC	Division championships	OW	Overall wins	CL	Conference losses	PL	Postseason losses
CC	Conference championships	OL	Overall losses	CT	Conference ties	PT	Postseason ties
NC	National championships	OT	Overall ties (Note: Overtime rules in college football were introduced in 1996, making ties impossible in the period since.)	C%	Conference winning percentage		
†	Elected to the College Football Hall of Fame	O%	Overall winning percentage (Note: When computing the win–loss percentage, a tie counts as half a win and half a loss.)				

== Coaches ==
Statistics correct as of the end of the 2025 college football season.

No.	Name	Term	GC	OW	OL	OT	O%	CW	CL	CT	C%	PW	PL	CCs	Awards	Ref.
1	Frank "Muddy" Waters	1975–1979	53	25	26	2	.491	—	—	—	—	—	—	—	—	
2	Jim Larkin	1980–1982	31	9	22	0	.290	—	—	—	—	—	—	—	—	
3	George Ihler	1983–1993	114	61	52	1	.539	—	—	—	—	—	—	—	—	
4	Jerry Kill	1994–1998	52	38	14	0	.731	—	—	—	—	—	—	—	—	
5	Randy Awrey	1999–2007	103	73	30	0	.709	—	—	—	—	—	—	—	—	
6	Jim Collins	2008–2018	121	65	56	0	.537	—	—	—	—	—	—	—	—	
7	Ryan Brady	2019–2025	66	39	27	0	.591	—	—	—	—	—	—	—	—	
8	Michael Engle	2026–present	–	–	–	–	–	—	—	—	—	—	—	—	—	
