= Saginaw Valley State Cardinals football, 2010–2019 =

American college football season

2010–2019 Saginaw Valley State Cardinals football
- Conference: Great Lakes Intercollegiate Athletic Conference
- Head coach: Jim Collins (2008–2018); Ryan Brady (2019)
- Home stadium: Harvey Randall Wickes Memorial Stadium

The Saginaw Valley State Cardinals football program, 2010–2019 represented Saginaw Valley State University during the 2010s in NCAA Division II college football as a member of the Great Lakes Intercollegiate Athletic Conference (GLIAC). The team was led during the decade by two head coaches: Jim Collins, who held the post for 11 years from 2008 to 2018 and compiled a 65–56 record; and Ryan Brady, who took over as head coach in 2019 and continues in the position as of 2025. Highlights of the decade included:

- The 2011 Saginaw Valley State Cardinals football team compiled a 7–4, tied for the GLIAC North Division championship, and advanced to the NCAA Division II playoffs where they lost in overtime to Minnesota Duluth.
- The 2012 team compiled an 8–3 record and tied for the GLIAC North championship.
- The 2013 team compiled a 9–3 record, won the GLIAC North championship, and advanced to the NCAA Division II playoffs where they lost to Grand Valley State in the first round.
- The 2018 team, in its final season under Jim Collins, compiled an 8–3 record and finished fourth in the GLIAC.
- Under new head coach Ryan Brady, the 2019 team compiled a 5–6 record.

The team played its home games at Harvey Randall Wickes Memorial Stadium, commonly shortened to Wickes Stadium, in University Center, Michigan.

== Decade overview ==
Year	Head coach	Overall record	Conf. record	Conf. rank	Points scored	Points against
2010	Jim Collins	4–7	4–6	7 (North)	303	312
2011	Jim Collins	7–4	7–3	T1 (North)	346	306
2012	Jim Collins	8–3	7–3	T1 (North)	360	284
2013	Jim Collins	9–3	9–1	1 (North)	453	381
2014	Jim Collins	2–9	2–8	13	152	291
2015	Jim Collins	1–10	1–9	14	182	335
2016	Jim Collins	5–5	5–5	8	265	286
2017	Jim Collins	5–6	3–6	8	255	263
2018	Jim Collins	8–3	5–3	4	296	183
2019	Ryan Brady	5–6	3–5	T5	337	265
TOTAL		54–56				

== 2010 ==
2010 Saginaw Valley State Cardinals football
- Conference: Great Lakes Intercollegiate Athletic Conference
- Record: 4–7 (4–6 GLIAC)
- Head coach: Jim Collins (3rd season)
- Defensive coordinator: Todd Stepsis (3rd season)
- Home stadium: Harvey Randall Wickes Memorial Stadium

2010 Great Lakes Intercollegiate Athletic Conference football standings
	Conf.			Overall
Team	W		L	W		L
North
No. 10 Grand Valley State $^	9	–	1	11	–	2
No. 25 Michigan Tech	8	–	2	8	–	2
Indianapolis	5	–	5	6	–	5
Ferris State	5	–	5	5	–	6
Northern Michigan	5	–	5	5	–	6
Northwood	5	–	5	5	–	6
Saginaw Valley State	4	–	6	4	–	7
South
No. 21 Wayne State (MI)	8	–	2	9	–	2
No. 16 Hillsdale ^	8	–	2	9	–	3
Ashland	7	–	3	8	–	3
Lake Erie	3	–	7	3	–	8
Ohio Dominican *	2	–	8	2	–	8
Findlay	1	–	9	1	–	10
Tiffin	0	–	10	1	–	10
$ – Conference champion; ^ – NCAA Division II playoff participant; * – Provisional NCAA Division II member; Rankings from AFCA poll

The 2010 Saginaw Valley State Cardinals football team represented Saginaw Valley State University (SVSU) as a member of the Great Lakes Intercollegiate Athletic Conference (GLIAC) during the 2010 NCAA Division II football season. In their third year under head coach Jim Collins, the Cardinals compiled a 4–7 record (4–7 in conference games), finished in last place in the GLIAC's North Division, and were outscored by a total of 312 to 303. It was SVSU's worst season since 1993 and one of only three losing seasons in the program's 23-year history.

In a pre-season coaches poll, SVSU was picked to finish third in the conference.

=== Schedule ===
Date	Time	Opponent	Rank	Site	Result	Attendance	Source
September 4	12:00 p.m.	No. 5 California (PA)*	No. 11	Wickes Stadium; University Center, MI	L 41–42	5,837	
September 11	6:00 p.m.	at Ferris State	No. 16	Top Taggart Field; Big Rapids, MI	L 17–21	3,201	
September 18	12:00 p.m.	Lake Erie		Wickes Stadium; University Center, MI	W 49–17	5,411	
September 25	12:00 p.m.	at Northwood		Hantz Stadium; Midland, MI (Axe Bowl)	L 26–30	4,319	
October 2	1:00 p.m.	at No. 11 Hillsdale		Muddy Waters Stadium; Hillsdale, MI	L 21–35	1,279	
October 9	12:00 p.m.	Michigan Tech^{†}		Wickes Stadium; University Center, MI	W 43–31	0	
October 16	12:00 p.m.	Indianapolis		Wickes Stadium; University Center, MI	W 24–20	3,416	
October 23	1:00 p.m.	at Ashland		Jack Miller Stadium; Ashland, OH	L 24–30	3,137	
October 30	12:00 p.m.	Wayne State (MI)		Wickes Stadium; University Center, MI	L 27–41	3,127	
November 6	1:00 p.m.	at Northern Michigan		Superior Dome; Marquette, MI	W 24–17 ^{OT}	1,987	
November 13	12:00 p.m.	No. 6 Grand Valley State		Wickes Stadium; University Center, MI (Battle of the Valleys)	L 7–28	8,927	
*Non-conference game; ^{†}Homecoming; Rankings from AFCA Poll released prior to the game; All times are in Eastern time

== 2011 ==
2011 Saginaw Valley State Cardinals football

GLIAC North co-champion

NCAA Division II first round, L 27–30 ^{OT} at Minnesota Duluth
- Conference: Great Lakes Intercollegiate Athletic Conference
- Record: 7–4 (7–3 GLIAC)
- Head coach: Jim Collins (4th season)
- Defensive coordinator: Todd Stepsis (4th season)
- Home stadium: Harvey Randall Wickes Memorial Stadium

2011 Great Lakes Intercollegiate Athletic Conference football standings
	Conf.			Overall
Team	W		L	W		L
North
Grand Valley State	7	–	3	8	–	3
Saginaw Valley State ^	7	–	3	7	–	4
Indianapolis	6	–	4	7	–	4
Michigan Tech	6	–	4	7	–	4
Ferris State	5	–	5	6	–	5
Northern Michigan	3	–	7	4	–	7
Northwood	1	–	9	2	–	9
South
Hillsdale $	8	–	2	8	–	3
No. 2 Wayne State (MI) ^	7	–	3	12	–	4
Ohio Dominican	6	–	4	7	–	4
Ashland	6	–	4	6	–	5
Findlay	6	–	4	6	–	5
Lake Erie	2	–	8	3	–	8
Tiffin	0	–	10	0	–	11
$ – Conference champion; ^ – NCAA Division II playoff participant; Rankings from AFCA poll

The 2011 Saginaw Valley State Cardinals football team represented Saginaw Valley State University (SVSU) as a member of the Great Lakes Intercollegiate Athletic Conference (GLIAC) during the 2011 NCAA Division II football season. In their fourth year under head coach Jim Collins, the Cardinals compiled a 7–4 record (7–3 in conference games), tied for the GLIAC's North Division championship, and outscored opponents by a total of 346 to 306. They advanced to the Division II playoffs, losing in overtime to Minnesota Duluth in the first round.

SVSU played in its first nationally televised game, as the Ashland game was televised on CBS College Sports Network as well as Fox Sports Detroit.

=== Schedule ===
Date	Opponent	Site	Result	Attendance	Source
September 10	Ferris State	Wickes Stadium; University Center, MI	W 30–27	8,173	
September 17	at Lake Erie	Jack Britt Memorial Stadium; Painesville, OH	W 35–20	2,642	
September 24	Northwood	Wickes Stadium; University Center, MI (Axe Bowl)	W 28–20	7,726	
October 1	Hillsdale^{†}	Wickes Stadium; University Center, MI	L 35–38	6,984	
October 8	at Michigan Tech	Sherman Field; Houghton, MI	W 44–41	3,092	
October 15	at Indianapolis	Key Stadium; Indianapolis, IN	L 20–29	2,678	
October 20	Ashland	Wickes Stadium; University Center, MI	W 27–6	2,913	
October 29	at No. 15 Wayne State (MI)	Tom Adams Field; Detroit, MI	W 28–20	3,099	
November 5	Northern Michigan	Wickes Stadium; University Center, MI	W 48–26	7,068	
November 12	at Grand Valley State	Lubbers Stadium; Allendale, MI (Battle of the Valleys)	L 24–49	11,163	
November 19	at Minnesota Duluth*	Malosky Stadium; Duluth, MN (NCAA Division II first round)	L 27–30 ^{OT}	1,012	
*Non-conference game; ^{†}Homecoming; Rankings from Coaches' Poll released prior to the game

== 2012 ==
2012 Saginaw Valley State Cardinals football

GLIAC North co-champion
- Conference: Great Lakes Intercollegiate Athletic Conference
- Record: 8–3 (7–3 GLIAC)
- Head coach: Jim Collins (5th season)
- Defensive coordinator: Todd Stepsis (5th season)
- Home stadium: Harvey Randall Wickes Memorial Stadium

2012 Great Lakes Intercollegiate Athletic Conference football standings
	Conf.			Overall
Team	W		L	W		L
North
Grand Valley State	7	–	3	8	–	3
Saginaw Valley State	7	–	3	8	–	3
Michigan Tech	7	–	3	7	–	3
Hillsdale	7	–	3	7	–	4
Ferris State	6	–	4	7	–	4
Wayne State (MI)	5	–	5	5	–	5
Northwood	4	–	6	5	–	6
Northern Michigan	4	–	6	5	–	6
South
No. 9 Ashland $^	10	–	0	11	–	1
Ohio Dominican	7	–	3	8	–	3
Findlay	7	–	3	7	–	3
Lake Erie	3	–	7	3	–	8
Notre Dame (OH)	2	–	8	3	–	8
Tiffin	2	–	8	3	–	8
Walsh *	2	–	8	3	–	8
Malone *	1	–	9	1	–	9
$ – Conference champion; ^ – NCAA Division II playoff participant; * – Provisional NCAA Division II member; Rankings from AFCA poll

The 2012 Saginaw Valley State Cardinals football team represented Saginaw Valley State University (SVSU) as a member of the Great Lakes Intercollegiate Athletic Conference (GLIAC) during the 2012 NCAA Division II football season. In their fifth year under head coach Jim Collins, the Cardinals compiled an 8–3 record (7–3 in conference games), tied for the GLIAC's North Division championship, and were outscored by a total of 360 to 284.

Junior wide receiver Jeff Janis caught 106 passes for 1,635 yards and 17 touchdowns. He set GLIAC single-game records with 300 receiving yards against Lake Eries and 18 receptions against Michigan Tech. He was selected as the GLIAC offensive back of the year for 2012.

Janis and two other SVSC players received first-team honors on the 2012 All-GLIAC team. The other first-team honorees were senior linebacker Grant Caserta and safety Jeff Heath. Caserta led the team with 109 tackles. Heath tied for the GLIAC lead with five interceptions. Four Cardinals received second-team All-GLIAC honors: quarterback Jonathon Jennings, tailback Tim Hogue, offensive lineman Christian Babini; and defensive lineman Ryan Busch.

=== Schedule ===
Date	Time	Opponent	Rank	Site	Result	Attendance	Source
September 1	7:00 p.m.	No. 8 Valdosta State*		Wickes Stadium; University Center, MI	W 28–24	4,891	
September 8		at Malone	No. 18	Fawcett Stadium; Canton, OH	W 37–14		
September 15		Findlay	No. 10	Wickes Stadium; University Center, MI	L 27–29		
September 22		at Lake Erie	No. 20	Jack Britt Memorial Stadium; Painesville, OH	W 51–24		
September 29		Ferris State	No. 16	Wickes Stadium; University Center, MI	W 31–24 ^{OT}	8,357	
October 6	12:00 p.m.	at Northwood	No. 15	Hantz Stadium; Midland, MI (Axe Bowl)	W 28–20	2,732	
October 11	8:00 p.m.	No. 18 Wayne State (MI)	No. 17	Wickes Stadium; University Center, MI	W 24–7	6,631	
October 20		at Hillsdale	No. 15	Muddy Waters Stadium; Hillsdale, MI	L 17–34	2,317	
October 27		Michigan Tech		Wickes Stadium; University Center, MI	W 34–23	3,782	
November 3	1:00 p.m.	at Northern Michigan		Superior Dome; Marquette, MI	L 28–33	1,733	
November 10		No. 15 Grand Valley State		Wickes Stadium; University Center, MI (Battle of the Valleys)	W 55–52	9,607	
*Non-conference game; Rankings from AFCA Poll released prior to the game; All times are in Eastern time

== 2013 ==
2013 Saginaw Valley State Cardinals football

GLIAC North champion

NCAA Division II first round, L 7–40 at Grand Valley State
- Conference: Great Lakes Intercollegiate Athletic Conference

Ranking
- AFCA: No. 22
- Record: 9–3 (9–1 GLIAC)
- Head coach: Jim Collins (6th season)
- Defensive coordinator: Todd Stepsis (6th season)
- Home stadium: Harvey Randall Wickes Memorial Stadium

2013 Great Lakes Intercollegiate Athletic Conference football standings
	Conf.			Overall
Team	W		L	W		L
North
No. 22 Saginaw Valley State ^	9	–	1	9	–	3
Ferris State	8	–	2	8	–	3
No. 3 Grand Valley State ^	7	–	2	12	–	3
Michigan Tech	6	–	4	6	–	4
Hillsdale	5	–	4	5	–	6
Northern Michigan	3	–	7	3	–	7
Wayne State (MI)	3	–	7	3	–	8
Northwood	1	–	8	2	–	9
South
No. 12 Ohio Dominican $^	9	–	0	10	–	1
Findlay	6	–	3	8	–	3
Ashland	5	–	4	5	–	5
Lake Erie	3	–	6	4	–	7
Walsh	3	–	6	3	–	8
Malone	1	–	8	2	–	9
Tiffin	1	–	8	2	–	9
$ – Conference champion; ^ – NCAA Division II playoff participant; Rankings from AFCA poll

The 2013 Saginaw Valley State Cardinals football team represented Saginaw Valley State University (SVSU) as a member of the Great Lakes Intercollegiate Athletic Conference (GLIAC) during the 2013 NCAA Division II football season. In their sixth year under head coach Jim Collins, the Cardinals compiled a 9–3 record (9–1 in conference games), won the GLIAC's North Division championship, and outscored opponents by a total of 453 to 381. The Cardinals were ranked No. 23 in the final AFCA Division II poll. Their only three losses were in the season opener against eventual Division II national champion Northwest Missouri State and to Division II semifinalist Grand Valley State to whom they lost in the final game of the regular season and in the first round of the Division II playoffs.

Wide receiver Jeff Janis caught 83 passes for 1,572 yards and 14 touchdowns. He was named the GLIAC offensive back of the year for the second consecutive year. He was also named to the 2013 Little All-America college football team and invited to play in the 2014 Senior Bowl. He later played for the Green Bay Packers from 2014 to 2017.

=== Schedule ===
Date	Opponent	Rank	Site	Result	Attendance	Source
September 5	at No. 4 Northwest Missouri State*	No. 22	Bearcat Stadium; Maryville, MO	L 24–45		
September 14	Malone		Wickes Stadium; University Center, MI	W 59–20		
September 21	at Findlay		Donnell Stadium; Findlay, OH	W 35–34		
September 28	Lake Erie		Wickes Stadium; University Center, MI	W 51–41		
October 5	at Ferris State		Top Taggart Field; Big Rapids, MI	W 31–28	3,664	
October 12	Northwood		Wickes Stadium; University Center, MI (Axe Bowl)	W 44–28	11,425	
October 19	at Wayne State (MI)		Tom Adams Field; Detroit, MI	W 14–10	2,325	
October 26	Hillsdale	No. 25	Wickes Stadium; University Center, MI	W 47–34	3,100	
November 2	at Michigan Tech	No. 23	Sherman Field; Houghton, MI	W 55–35	1,492	
November 9	Northern Michigan	No. 19	Wickes Stadium; University Center, MI	W 52–17	6,257	
November 16	at Grand Valley State	No. 15	Lubbers Stadium; Allendale, MI (Battle of the Valleys)	L 34–49	11,888	
November 23	at No. 22 Grand Valley State	No. 21	Lubbers Stadium; Allendale, MI (NCAA Division II first round)	L 7–40	5,098	
*Non-conference game; Rankings from AFCA Poll released prior to the game

== 2014 ==
2014 Saginaw Valley State Cardinals football
- Conference: Great Lakes Intercollegiate Athletic Conference
- Record: 2–9 (2–8 GLIAC)
- Head coach: Jim Collins (7th season)
- Home stadium: Harvey Randall Wickes Memorial Stadium

2014 Great Lakes Intercollegiate Athletic Conference football standings
	Conf.			Overall
Team	W		L	W		L
No. 11 Ferris State $^	10	–	0	11	–	1
No. 4 Ohio Dominican ^	9	–	1	11	–	2
No. 21 Michigan Tech ^	9	–	1	9	–	2
Ashland	8	–	2	8	–	2
Wayne State (MI)	6	–	4	7	–	4
Grand Valley State	6	–	4	6	–	5
Findlay	4	–	6	5	–	6
Northwood	4	–	6	5	–	6
Tiffin	4	–	6	5	–	6
Hillsdale	4	–	6	4	–	7
Lake Erie	3	–	7	4	–	7
Walsh	3	–	7	4	–	7
Northern Michigan	2	–	8	3	–	8
Saginaw Valley State	2	–	8	2	–	9
Malone	1	–	9	1	–	10
$ – Conference champion; ^ – NCAA Division II playoff participant; Rankings from AFCA poll

The 2014 Saginaw Valley State Cardinals football team represented Saginaw Valley State University (SVSU) as a member of the Great Lakes Intercollegiate Athletic Conference (GLIAC) during the 2014 NCAA Division II football season. In their seventh year under head coach Jim Collins, the Cardinals compiled a 2–9 record (2–8 in conference games), tied for 13th place in the GLIAC, and were outscored by a total of 291 to 152.

=== Schedule ===
Date	Opponent	Site	Result	Attendance	Source
September 6	Indianapolis	Wickes Stadium; University Center, MI	L 10–24		
September 13	Tiffin	Wickes Stadium; University Center, MI	L 17–28		
September 20	at Michigan Tech	Sherman Field; Houghton, MI	L 20–26	2,202	
September 27	No. 14 Ferris State	Wickes Stadium; University Center, MI	L 13–47	6,250	
October 4	Northern Michigan	Wickes Stadium; University Center, MI	W 14–7	4,110	
October 11	at Ashland	Jack Miller Stadium; Ashland, OH	L 7–38		
October 18	at Lake Erie	Jack Britt Memorial Stadium; Painesville, OH	L 21–24		
October 25	Northwood	Wickes Stadium; University Center, MI (Axe Bowl)	W 16–14	8,253	
November 1	at Hillsdale	Muddy Waters Stadium; Hillsdale, MI	L 17–24	906	
November 8	at No. 11 Ohio Dominican	Panther Stadium; Columbus, OH	L 14–38		
November 15	Grand Valley State	Wickes Stadium; University Center, MI (Battle of the Valleys)	L 3–21	5,460	
Rankings from AFCA Poll released prior to the game

== 2015 ==
2015 Saginaw Valley State Cardinals football
- Conference: Great Lakes Intercollegiate Athletic Conference
- Record: 1–10 (1–9 GLIAC)
- Head coach: Jim Collins (8th season)
- Home stadium: Harvey Randall Wickes Memorial Stadium

2015 Great Lakes Intercollegiate Athletic Conference football standings
	Conf.			Overall
Team	W		L	W		L
No. 6 Ferris State +^	10	–	0	11	–	1
No. 10 Ashland +^	10	–	0	10	–	1
No. 4 Grand Valley State ^	8	–	2	12	–	3
Ohio Dominican	7	–	3	8	–	3
Michigan Tech	7	–	3	7	–	3
Findlay	5	–	5	6	–	5
Wayne State (MI)	5	–	5	6	–	5
Hillsdale	5	–	5	5	–	6
Northwood	5	–	5	5	–	6
Northern Michigan	4	–	6	5	–	6
Tiffin	4	–	6	5	–	6
Walsh	2	–	8	2	–	8
Lake Erie	2	–	8	2	–	9
Saginaw Valley State	1	–	9	1	–	10
Malone	0	–	10	0	–	10
$ – Conference champion; ^ – NCAA Division II playoff participant; Rankings from AFCA poll

The 2015 Saginaw Valley State Cardinals football team represented Saginaw Valley State University (SVSU) as a member of the Great Lakes Intercollegiate Athletic Conference (GLIAC) during the 2015 NCAA Division II football season. In their eighth year under head coach Jim Collins, the Cardinals compiled a 1–10 record (1–9 in conference games), finished in 14th place in the GLIAC, and were outscored by a total of 335 to 182.

=== Schedule ===
Date	Opponent	Site	Result	Attendance	Source
September 3	at Indianapolis*	Key Stadium; Indianapolis, IN	L 17–27		
September 12	at Tiffin	Frost–Kalnow Stadium; Tiffin, OH	L 0–40	830	
September 19	Michigan Tech	Wickes Stadium; University Center, MI	L 21–35	7,325	
September 26	at Ferris State	Top Taggart Field; Big Rapids, MI	L 18–35	6,577	
October 3	at Northern Michigan	Superior Dome; Marquette, MI	L 34–36	1,523	
October 10	Ashland	Wickes Stadium; University Center, MI	L 7–33		
October 17	Lake Erie	Wickes Stadium; University Center, MI	W 37–34		
October 24	at Northwood	Hantz Stadium; Midland, MI (Axe Bowl)	L 14–21	1,825	
October 31	Hillsdale	Wickes Stadium; University Center, MI	L 0–26	1,012	
November 7	Ohio Dominican	Wickes Stadium; University Center, MI	L 17–24		
November 14	at No. 14 Grand Valley State	Lubbers Stadium; Allendale, MI (Battle of the Valleys)	L 17–24	12,951	
*Non-conference game; Rankings from AFCA Poll released prior to the game

== 2016 ==
2016 Saginaw Valley State Cardinals football
- Conference: Great Lakes Intercollegiate Athletic Conference
- Record: 5–5 (5–5 GLIAC)
- Head coach: Jim Collins (9th season)
- Home stadium: Harvey Randall Wickes Memorial Stadium

2016 Great Lakes Intercollegiate Athletic Conference football standings
	Conf.			Overall
Team	W		L	W		L
No. 4 Grand Valley State $^	10	–	0	12	–	1
No. 5 Ferris State ^	9	–	2	12	–	3
No. 19 Ashland	7	–	2	9	–	2
Tiffin	7	–	3	8	–	3
Ohio Dominican	7	–	4	7	–	4
Wayne State (MI)	7	–	4	7	–	4
Findlay	6	–	5	6	–	5
Saginaw Valley State	5	–	5	5	–	5
Hillsdale	4	–	5	5	–	5
Michigan Tech	4	–	6	4	–	6
Northern Michigan	3	–	7	3	–	8
Northwood	3	–	8	3	–	8
Walsh	0	–	10	1	–	10
Lake Erie	0	–	11	0	–	11
$ – Conference champion; ^ – NCAA Division II playoff participant; Rankings from AFCA poll

The 2016 Saginaw Valley State Cardinals football team represented Saginaw Valley State University (SVSU) as a member of the Great Lakes Intercollegiate Athletic Conference (GLIAC) during the 2016 NCAA Division II football season. In their ninth year under head coach Jim Collins, the Cardinals compiled a 5–5 record (5–5 in conference games), finished in eighth place in the GLIAC, and were outscored by a total of 286 to 265.

Ryan Conklin, a reshirt freshman from Standish-Sterling, took over at quartertback.

=== Schedule ===
Date	Time	Opponent	Site	Result	Attendance	Source
September 3	7:00 p.m.	at Findlay	Donnell Stadium; Findlay, OH	L 19–37	1,812	
September 10	7:00 p.m.	Northwood	Wickes Stadium; University Center, MI (Axe Bowl)	W 20–14 ^{OT}	6,327	
September 17	12:00 p.m.	at Walsh	Larry Staudt Field; North Canton, OH	W 27–17	1,800	
September 24	7:00 p.m.	Ohio Dominican	Wickes Stadium; University Center, MI	L 10–21	4,143	
October 1	1:00 p.m.	at Michigan Tech	Sherman Field; Houghton, MI	W 17–16	3,328	
October 8	7:00 p.m.	Northern Michigan	Wickes Stadium; University Center, MI	W 41–13	7,103	
October 22	12:00 p.m.	at No. 22 Wayne State (MI)	Tom Adams Field; Detroit, MI	L 14–42	2,720	
October 29	3:00 p.m.	Lake Erie	Wickes Stadium; University Center, MI	W 44–13	4,862	
November 5	3:00 p.m.	No. 2 Grand Valley State	Wickes Stadium; University Center, MI (Battle of the Valleys)	L 56–62 ^{OT}	10,027	
November 12	1:00 p.m.	at No. 18 Ferris State	Top Taggart Field; Big Rapids, MI	L 17–51	2,517	
Rankings from AFCA Poll released prior to the game; All times are in Eastern time

== 2017 ==
2017 Saginaw Valley State Cardinals football
- Conference: Great Lakes Intercollegiate Athletic Conference
- Record: 5–6 (3–6 GLIAC)
- Head coach: Jim Collins (10th season)
- Home stadium: Harvey Randall Wickes Memorial Stadium

2017 Great Lakes Intercollegiate Athletic Conference football standings
	Conf.			Overall
Team	W		L	W		L
No. 10 Ashland $^	9	–	0	11	–	2
No. 5 Ferris State ^	8	–	1	11	–	2
Grand Valley State	7	–	2	8	–	3
Tiffin	5	–	4	6	–	5
Northwood	5	–	4	7	–	4
Wayne State (MI)	4	–	5	5	–	6
Michigan Tech	3	–	6	4	–	7
Saginaw Valley State	3	–	6	5	–	6
Northern Michigan	1	–	8	1	–	9
Davenport *	0	–	9	1	–	10
$ – Conference champion; ^ – NCAA Division II playoff participant; * – Provisional Division II member; Rankings from AFCA poll

The 2017 Saginaw Valley State Cardinals football team represented Saginaw Valley State University (SVSU) as a member of the Great Lakes Intercollegiate Athletic Conference (GLIAC) during the 2017 NCAA Division II football season. In their tenth year under head coach Jim Collins, the Cardinals compiled a 5–6 record (3–6 in conference games), finished in eighth place in the GLIAC, and were outscored by a total of 263 to 255.

=== Schedule ===
Date	Time	Opponent	Site	Result	Attendance	Source
September 2	12:00 p.m.	at Alderson Broaddus*	Philippi, WV	W 42–24	1,671	
September 9	3:00 p.m.	Walsh*	Wickes Stadium; University Center, MI	W 28–0	7,912	
September 16	6:07 p.m.	at Wayne State (MI)	Tom Adams Field; Detroit, MI	L 31–41	3,961	
September 23	1:00 p.m.	Michigan Tech	Wickes Stadium; University Center, MI	L 24–28	3,891	
September 30	7:06 p.m.	at No. 9 Grand Valley State	Lubbers Stadium; Allendale, MI (Battle of the Valleys)	L 6–34	15,985	
October 7	3:00 p.m.	Davenport	Wickes Stadium; University Center, MI	W 33–0	2,485	
October 14	3:00 p.m.	No. 15 Ferris State^{†}	Wickes Stadium; University Center, MI	L 17–49	4,217	
October 21	1:00 p.m.	at Northern Michigan	Superior Dome; Marquette, MI	W 20–12	2,393	
October 28	3:00 p.m.	Tiffin	Wickes Stadium; University Center, MI	W 14–9	1,758	
November 4	1:00 p.m.	at Northwood	Hantz Stadium; Midland, MI (Axe Bowl)	L 21–35	2,006	
November 11	1:00 p.m.	at Ashland	Ashland, OH	L 19–31	2,952	
*Non-conference game; ^{†}Homecoming; Rankings from Coaches' Poll released prior to the game; All times are in Eastern time

== 2018 ==
2018 Saginaw Valley State Cardinals football
- Conference: Great Lakes Intercollegiate Athletic Conference
- Record: 8–3 (5–3 GLIAC)
- Head coach: Jim Collins (11th season)
- Home stadium: Harvey Randall Wickes Memorial Stadium

2018 Great Lakes Intercollegiate Athletic Conference football standings
	Conf.			Overall
Team	W		L	W		L
No. 2 Ferris State $^	8	–	0	15	–	1
No. 14 Grand Valley State ^	7	–	1	10	–	2
Ashland	6	–	2	6	–	4
Saginaw Valley State	5	–	3	8	–	3
Davenport *	3	–	5	6	–	5
Northwood	3	–	5	3	–	7
Michigan Tech	2	–	6	4	–	6
Northern Michigan	1	–	7	3	–	8
Wayne State (MI)	1	–	7	2	–	9
$ – Conference champion; ^ – NCAA Division II playoff participant; * – Provisional NCAA Division II member; Rankings from AFCA poll

The 2018 Saginaw Valley State Cardinals football team represented Saginaw Valley State University (SVSU) as a member of the Great Lakes Intercollegiate Athletic Conference (GLIAC) during the 2018 NCAA Division II football season. In their eleventh and final year under head coach Jim Collins, the Cardinals compiled an 8–3 record (5–3 in conference games), finished in fourth place in the GLIAC, and outscored opponents by a total of 296 to 183.

=== Schedule ===
Date	Opponent	Site	Result	Attendance	Source
August 30	Alderson Broaddus*	Wickes Stadium; University Center, MI	W 45–7		
September 8	at Walsh*	North Canton, OH	W 41–10		
September 15	Truman*	Wickes Stadium; University Center, MI	W 21–20		
September 22	Wayne State (MI)	Wickes Stadium; University Center, MI	W 35–29 ^{OT}	3,950	
September 29	at Michigan Tech	Sherman Field; Houghton, MI	W 10–0		
October 6	at Ashland	Jack Miller Stadium; Ashland, OH	L 17–21		
October 13	Northern Michigan^{†}	Wickes Stadium; University Center, MI	W 30–10	6,100	
October 20	No. 2 Ferris State	Wickes Stadium; University Center, MI	L 14–28	1,425	
October 27	No. 9 Grand Valley State	Wickes Stadium; University Center, MI (Battle of the Valleys)	L 28–31		
November 3	at Northwood	Hantz Stadium; Midland, MI (Axe Bowl)	W 31–10		
November 10	at Davenport	Farmers Insurance Athletic Complex; Caledonia Township, MI	W 24–17 ^{OT}	651	
*Non-conference game; ^{†}Homecoming; Rankings from Coaches' Poll released prior to the game

== 2019 ==
2019 Saginaw Valley State Cardinals football
- Conference: Great Lakes Intercollegiate Athletic Conference
- Record: 5–6 (3–5 GLIAC)
- Head coach: Ryan Brady (1st season)
- Home stadium: Harvey Randall Wickes Memorial Stadium

2019 Great Lakes Intercollegiate Athletic Conference football standings
	Conf.			Overall
Team	W		L	W		L
No. 3 Ferris State $^	8	–	0	12	–	1
Wayne State (MI)	7	–	1	8	–	3
Ashland	6	–	2	7	–	4
Grand Valley State	5	–	3	8	–	3
Davenport	3	–	5	5	–	5
Michigan Tech	3	–	5	5	–	5
Saginaw Valley State	3	–	5	5	–	6
Northwood	1	–	7	1	–	10
Northern Michigan	0	–	8	1	–	9
$ – Conference champion; ^ – NCAA Division II playoff participant; Rankings from AFCA poll

The 2019 Saginaw Valley State Cardinals football team represented Saginaw Valley State University (SVSU) as a member of the Great Lakes Intercollegiate Athletic Conference (GLIAC) during the 2019 NCAA Division II football season. In their first year under head coach Ryan Brady, the Cardinals compiled a 5–6 record (3–5 in conference games), finished in a three-way tie for fifth place in the GLIAC, and outscored opponents by a total of 337 to 265.

Former head coach Jim Collins left SVSU in February 2019 to become director of player personnel for the Army Cadets football program. SVSU chose Ryan Brady as its new head coach in March 2019. Brady had been an assistant coach at Ferris State for several years.

=== Schedule ===
Date	Opponent	Site	Result	Attendance	Source
September 7	at Texas A&M–Kingsville*	Javelina Stadium; Kingsville, TX	W 35–14	8,517	
September 14	Tiffin*	Wickes Stadium; University Center, MI	W 35–20	4,725	
September 21	Michigan Tech	Wickes Stadium; University Center, MI	W 23–7	4,850	
September 28	at Wayne State (MI)	Tom Adams Field; Detroit, MI	L 24–20	3,277	
October 5	Northwood^{†}	Wickes Stadium; University Center, MI (Axe Bowl)	W 55–29	4,950	
October 12	at No. 19 Grand Valley State	Lubbers Stadium; Allendale, MI (Battle of the Valleys)	L 35–28	13,180	
October 19	at Lindenwood*	Hunter Stadium; St. Charles, MO	L 35–31	2,068	
October 26	at No. 2 Ferris State	Top Taggart Field; Big Rapids, MI	L 34–10	3,404	
November 2	Ashland	Wickes Stadium; University Center, MI	L 24–21	2,119	
November 9	at Northern Michigan	Superior Dome; Marquette, MI	W 56–10	1,522	
November 16	Davenport	Wickes Stadium; University Center, MI	L 33–23	1,750	
*Non-conference game; ^{†}Homecoming; Rankings from Coaches' Poll released prior to the game
