= List of Saginaw Valley State Cardinals in the NFL draft =

This is a list of Saginaw Valley State Cardinals football players in the NFL draft.

== Key ==
B	Back	K	Kicker	NT	Nose tackle
C	Center	LB	Linebacker	FB	Fullback
DB	Defensive back	P	Punter	HB	Halfback
DE	Defensive end	QB	Quarterback	WR	Wide receiver
DT	Defensive tackle	RB	Running back	G	Guard
E	End	T	Offensive tackle	TE	Tight end

= Pro Bowler
= Hall of Famer

== Selections ==
Year	Round	Pick	Overall	Player	Team	Position
1982	3	4	59	Eugene Marve	Buffalo Bills	LB
1999	1	22	22	Lamar King	Seattle Seahawks	DE
2005	4	25	126	Todd Herremans	Philadelphia Eagles	OT
2014	7	21	236	Jeff Janis	Green Bay Packers	WR
