= 2013 Little All-America college football team =

The 2013 Little All-America college football team is composed of college football players from Division II, III, and NAIA schools who were selected by the Associated Press (AP) as the best players at each position.

== First team ==
Position	Player	Team
Offense
Quarterback	Dustin Vaughan	West Texas A&M
Running back	Franklyn Quiteh	Bloomsburg
Running back	Domonique Hayden	Thomas More
Wide receiver	Jeff Janis	Saginaw Valley State
Wide receiver	Tyler Rutenbeck	Dubuque
Tight end	Joe Don Duncan	Dixie State
Offensive line	Matt Armstrong	Grand Valley State
Offensive line	Armand Jenifer	Johns Hopkins
Offensive line	Brian Clarke	Bloomsburg
Offensive line	Cole Manhart	Nebraska-Kearney
Offensive line	Cody Carlson	Northwest Missouri State
Defense
Defensive line	Jake Metz	Shippensburg
Defensive line	Matt Fechko	Mount Union
Defensive line	Darius Allen	CSU–Pueblo
Defensive line	Matt Longacre	Northwest Missouri State
Linebacker	Nate Dreiling	Pittsburgh State
Linebacker	Seth Mathis	Bethel (MN)
Linebacker	Tavarius Wilson	North Alabama
Defensive back	Jack Moro	St. Cloud State
Defensive back	Pierre Desir	Lindenwood
Defensive back	Andre Carter	Salisbury
Defensive back	Justin Bell	Ohio Dominican
Special Teams
Kicker	Steven Wakefield	Mercyhurst
Punter	Scottie Gallardo	Fort Lewis
All-purpose	Rondell White	West Chester

== See also ==
- 2013 College Football All-America Team
