= Joseph Duncan =

Joseph or Joe Duncan may refer to:

- Joseph Duncan (politician) (1794–1844), sixth Governor of the state of Illinois (1834–1838)
- Joseph Alfred Duncan (born 1993), Ghanaian footballer
- Joseph Edward Duncan (1963–2021), American convicted serial killer and child molester
- Joseph Forbes Duncan (1879–1964), Scottish trade unionist and politician
- Joe Duncan (baseball), American baseball player
- Joe Don Duncan (born 1990), American football player
