= Ryan Brady =

American football coach (born c. 1980)

Biographical details
- Born: c. 1980 (age 45–46); Chesaning, Michigan, U.S.
- Education: Grand Valley State University (2003); Saginaw Valley State University

Playing career
- 1999–2002: Grand Valley State
- Position: Quarterback

Coaching career (HC unless noted)
- 2003: Grand Valley State (QB)
- 2004: Muskegon HS (MI) (assistant)
- 2005: Chesaning HS (MI) (assistant)
- 2006–2007: Montrose HS (CO) (OC/QB)
- 2008: Perry HS (MI)
- 2009: Grand Rapids (QB)
- 2010–2011: Grand Rapids (OC/QB)
- 2012–2013: Ferris State (OC/QB)
- 2014–2015: Ferris State (co-DC/LB)
- 2016: Ferris State (OC/OL/TE)
- 2017–2018: Ferris State (co-DC/LB)
- 2019–2025: Saginaw Valley State

Head coaching record
- Overall: 39–27 (college); 0–9 (high school)

Ryan Brady (born c. 1980) is an American college football coach. He was the head football coach for Saginaw Valley State University from 2019 to 2025. He also coached for Grand Valley State, Muskegon High School, Chesaning High School, Montrose High School, Perry High School, Grand Rapids Community College, and Ferris State. He played college football for Grand Valley State as a quarterback.

== Head coaching record ==
=== College ===
Year	Team	Overall	Conference	Standing	Bowl/playoffs
Saginaw Valley State Cardinals (Great Lakes Intercollegiate Athletic Conference) (2019–2025)
2019	Saginaw Valley State	5–6	3–5	T–5th	
2020–21	No team—COVID-19				
2021	Saginaw Valley State	7–4	4–3	4th	
2022	Saginaw Valley State	8–3	3–3	4th	
2023	Saginaw Valley State	6–5	3–3	4th	
2024	Saginaw Valley State	7–4	4–3	T–3rd	
2025	Saginaw Valley State	6–5	5–2	T–2nd	
Saginaw Valley State:		39–27	22–19		
Total:		39–27			

=== High school ===
Year	Team	Overall	Conference	Standing	Bowl/playoffs
Perry Ramblers () (2008)
2008	Perry	0–9	0–5	6th	
Perry:		0–9	0–5		
Total:		0–9			
