= Mike McCarthy =

American football coach (born 1963)

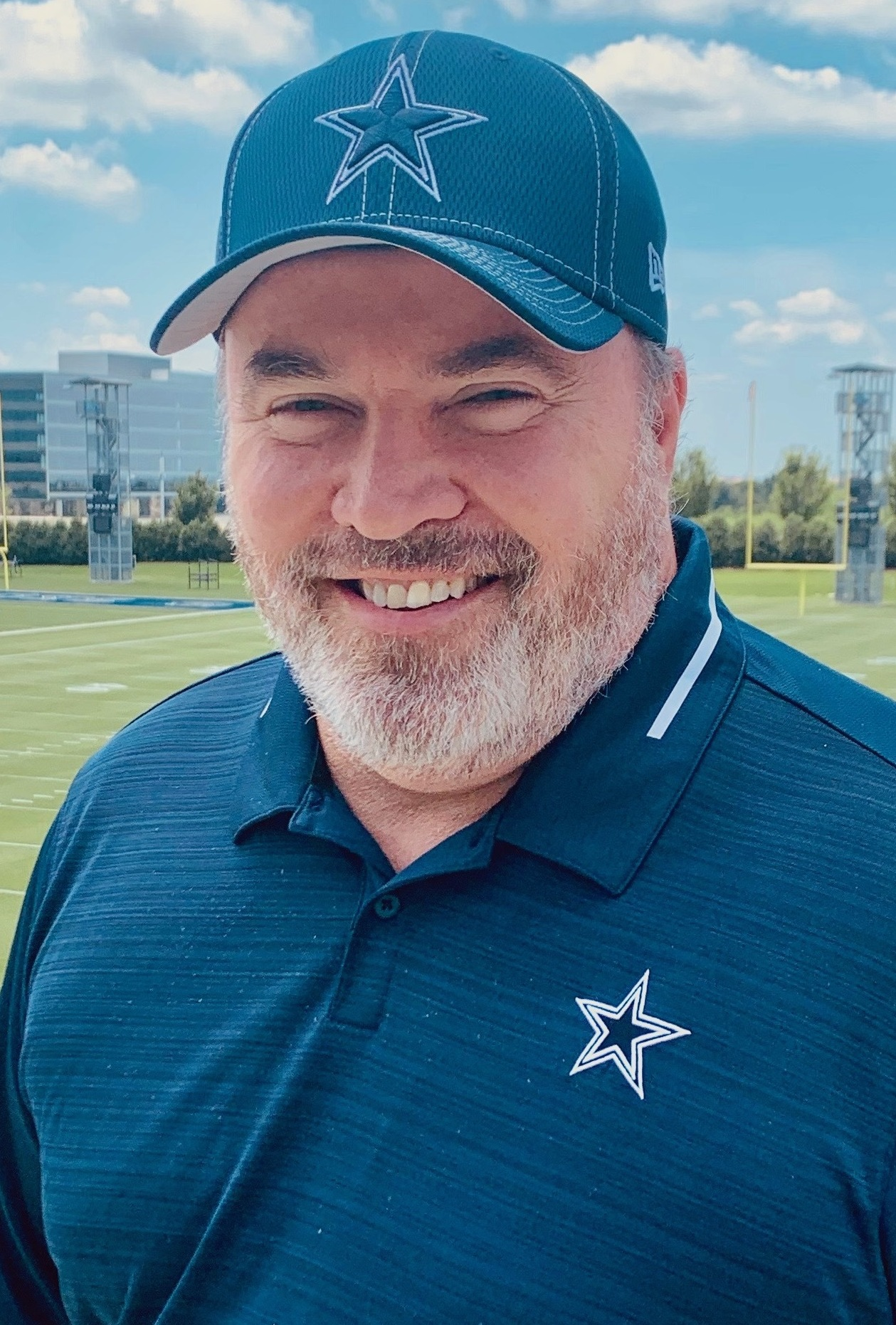
- McCarthy with the Dallas Cowboys in 2021

Pittsburgh Steelers
- Title: Head coach

Personal information
- Born: November 10, 1963 (age 63); Pittsburgh, Pennsylvania, U.S.

Career information
- High school: Bishop Boyle (Homestead, Pennsylvania)
- College: Baker
- NFL draft: 1987: undrafted

Career history
- Fort Hays State (1987–1988) Graduate assistant; Pittsburgh (1989–1992); Graduate assistant (1989–1991); Wide receivers coach (1992); Kansas City Chiefs (1993–1998); Offensive quality control (1993–1994); Quarterbacks coach (1995–1998); Green Bay Packers (1999) Quarterbacks coach; New Orleans Saints (2000–2004) Offensive coordinator; San Francisco 49ers (2005) Offensive coordinator; Green Bay Packers (2006–2018) Head coach; Dallas Cowboys (2020–2024) Head coach; Pittsburgh Steelers (2026–present) Head coach

Awards and highlights
- Super Bowl champion (XLV); Greasy Neale Award (2011)

Head coaching record
- Regular season: 179–114–2 (.610)
- Postseason: 11–11 (.500)
- Career: 190–125–2 (.603)
- Coaching profile at Pro Football Reference

Michael John McCarthy (born November 10, 1963) is an American professional football coach who is the head coach for the Pittsburgh Steelers of the National Football League (NFL). Previously, he served as the head coach of the Dallas Cowboys and Green Bay Packers. In 2011, McCarthy led the Packers to a win in Super Bowl XLV over his hometown Steelers. McCarthy was also the offensive coordinator for the San Francisco 49ers and New Orleans Saints.

During his 19 seasons as a head coach in the NFL, McCarthy has an overall regular season record of 174–112–2. He is among only five head coaches (Tom Landry, Chuck Noll, Andy Reid, and Bill Belichick) to lead one franchise to eight straight playoff appearances. McCarthy is second to Curly Lambeau in all-time wins leading the Packers.

== Early life ==
McCarthy was born and raised in Pittsburgh, Pennsylvania, in the blue collar neighborhood of Greenfield. His mother, Ellen McCarthy, was a secretary who also worked in restaurants and for the Peace & Justice Center. His father, Joe McCarthy Jr., was a firefighter for the Pittsburgh Fire Bureau and an officer for the Pittsburgh Police Department. He also owned a bar called Joe McCarthy's Bar and Grill, which Mike spent his Sundays cleaning before church. McCarthy was raised as a Pittsburgh Steelers fan.

McCarthy is one of five siblings. He has three sisters, Colleen, Ellen, and Kellie, and a brother, Joseph III (d. 2015). McCarthy attended St. Rosalia primary school, where he played basketball. McCarthy later made annual donations to the school. He attended Bishop Boyle High School.

=== Playing career and education ===
After high school, McCarthy initially went to Salem University (then Salem College) in West Virginia before returning home to work in his father's bar. In 1984, McCarthy attended Scottsdale Community College in Arizona, playing one season for the Fighting Artichokes football team. He then transferred to Baker University, an NAIA school located in Baldwin City, Kansas. McCarthy was a two-time all-conference tight end. In 1986, he was captain of the team, which finished the season as the national runner-up in NAIA Division II.

In 1987, McCarthy earned a bachelor's in business administration.

== Coaching career ==
=== College ===
In 1987, Duane Dirk, the defensive coordinator at Fort Hays State University in Kansas, hired McCarthy as a defensive graduate assistant (GA). Over the next two years, McCarthy focused on linebackers and defensive ends. During his time as the defensive graduate assistant, McCarthy pursued a Master of Science degree, and he graduated with a master's in sports administration in 1989.

After serving as a graduate assistant at Fort Hays State from 1987 to 1988, McCarthy returned home to Pittsburgh. On July 30, 1989, McCarthy contacted Mike Gottfried, the head coach at the University of Pittsburgh, looking for a coaching job, but no positions were available. McCarthy was told to mail his resume, and he later showed up at Gottfried's office without an appointment to introduce himself. Two days later, one of Gottfried's assistants resigned, and McCarthy was offered a volunteer coach position without pay. McCarthy later worked under coach Paul Hackett.

McCarthy served as a graduate assistant for three seasons before coaching wide receivers during the 1992 season. Initially, he also worked the night shift on the Pennsylvania Turnpike as a toll collector during the off-season to supplement his income. McCarthy stated that he spent his time in the tollbooth reviewing the University of Pittsburgh playbook.

=== Kansas City Chiefs ===
In 1993, McCarthy and Paul Hackett left Pittsburgh and were hired by the Kansas City Chiefs under head coach Marty Schottenheimer. McCarthy worked two years as an offensive quality control assistant. As head coach of the Green Bay Packers, he hired six former quality control coaches to serve as his position coaches. In 1993 and 1994, McCarthy worked with Hall of Fame quarterback Joe Montana.

In 1995, McCarthy became quarterbacks coach for the Chiefs, overseeing Rich Gannon, Elvis Grbac, and Steve Bono. McCarthy's signal callers threw 52 interceptions – the lowest in the American Football Conference (AFC) – from 1995 through 1998.

=== Green Bay Packers ===
When Schottenheimer resigned from the Chiefs after the 1998 season, McCarthy left Kansas City and became the Packers' quarterbacks coach, where worked with Hall of Famer Brett Favre. In the 1999 season, while working with McCarthy, Favre threw for 4,091 yards, the fourth-best total of his career. While McCarthy was quarterbacks coach, the 1999 Packers team was ranked seventh in passing and ninth in overall offense in the league.

=== New Orleans Saints ===
In 2000, McCarthy was hired as the offensive coordinator for the New Orleans Saints. That year, the Saints achieved a 10–6 regular season record, then won their first playoff game in the franchise's history and finished 10th overall in offense. McCarthy was selected as National Football Conference (NFC) Assistant Coach of the Year by USA Today in 2000.

The Saints failed to make the playoffs over the next three years. In 2002, the Saints led the NFC in scoring with 49 touchdowns and 432 points, but slowed down at the end of the season. The following year, the Saints scored 340 points—their eighth highest-scoring season ever. All of McCarthy's four years with the Saints rank in the team's top 10 years for offense.

While McCarthy was with the team, the Saints’ offense set 25 individual and 10 team records. Joe Horn caught 45 touchdowns and 437 passes for 6,289 yards. During McCarthy's time with the team, running backs Ricky Williams and Deuce McCallister both had a 1,000-yard season. In his first two years, running back Ricky Williams would run for 2,245 yards with 14 touchdowns. McCarthy stayed with the team for five seasons through 2004.

=== San Francisco 49ers ===
In 2005, McCarthy served as offensive coordinator for the San Francisco 49ers by head coach Mike Nolan. His unit had setbacks, including the trade of their most experienced quarterback, Tim Rattay. Rattay was replaced by a rookie quarterback, top draft pick Alex Smith, who was injured in Week 7 of the season.

The 49ers finished the season ranked 30th in the NFL in points scored and dead last in yards gained. Despite this, rookie running back Frank Gore would emerge to run for 608 rushing yards on 127 carries with a 4.8 Yards Per Carry (YPC) while wide receiver Brandon Lloyd had 733 yards receiving and five touchdowns.

=== Green Bay Packers (second stint) ===
==== 2006–2009 ====
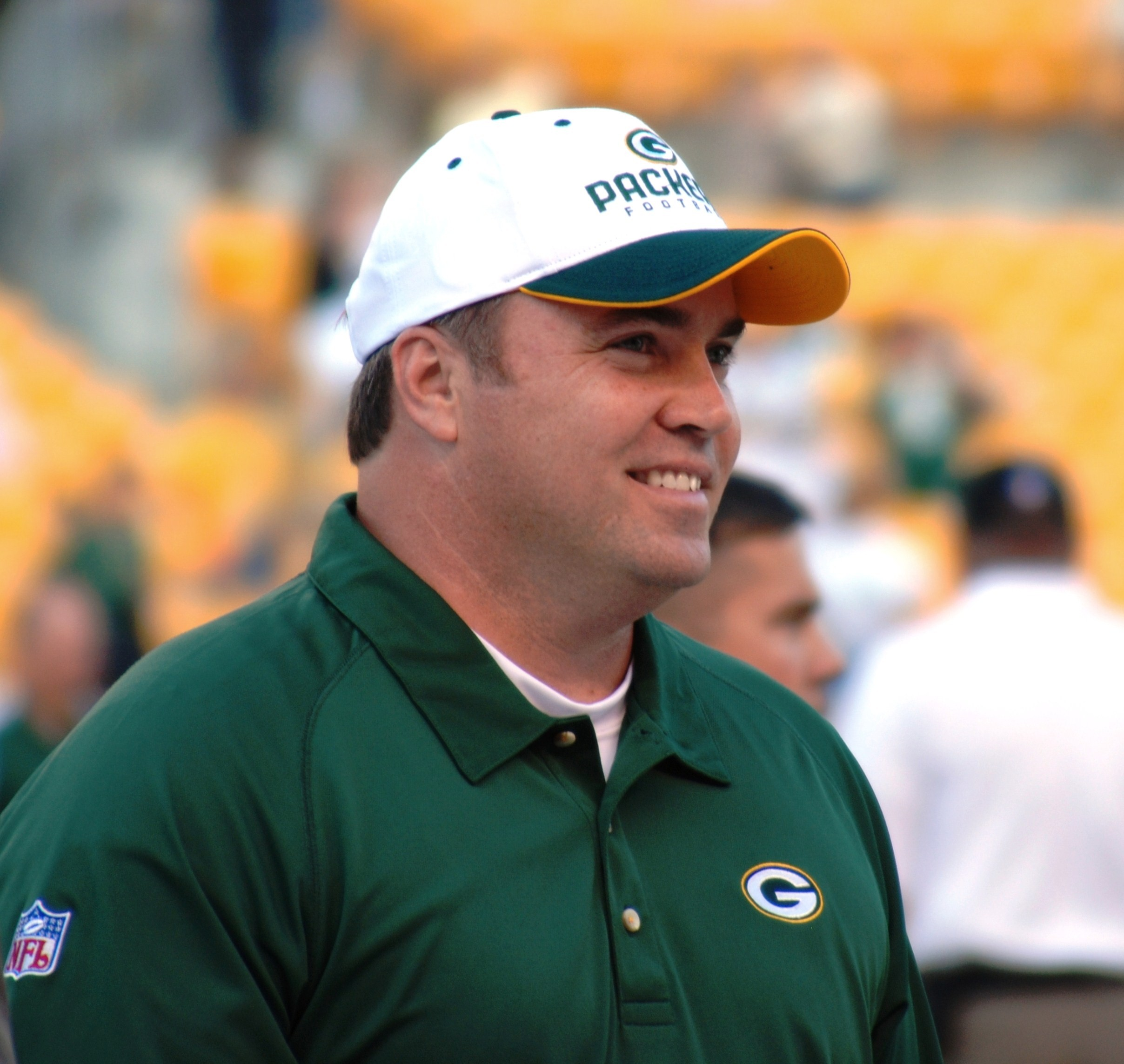
McCarthy with the Green Bay Packers in 2007

After Mike Sherman took the Packers to a 4–12 record in 2005, the team fired him on January 2, 2006, and immediately started interviewing for a replacement. McCarthy was interviewed by Packers general manager Ted Thompson on January 8, and was offered the head coaching position three days later.

In 2006, the Packers started with a 4–8 record, but the team still managed to win their last four games after both quarterback Brett Favre and backup quarterback Aaron Rodgers sustained injuries, finishing the season 8–8, ending with a victory over their archrival, the Chicago Bears.

McCarthy guided the Packers to an 8–1 record through the first nine games of the 2007 season, tying Washington's Joe Gibbs for the best win–loss ratio to start the first 25 games of a career at 16–9 and passing Vince Lombardi, who went 15–10, for the best coaching start in Packers' history. The team finished the regular season with a 13–3 record and obtained the number two seed in the NFC playoffs. McCarthy led the Packers to the NFC Championship Game, where they lost to the eventual Super Bowl-winning New York Giants in overtime. After the 2007 season, McCarthy finished second in voting for The Associated Press Coach of the Year award, garnering 15 votes to Bill Belichick's 29 votes.

On January 19, 2008, McCarthy signed a five-year contract extension with the team, which raised his salary to $3.4 million a year. The 2008 season was a tumultuous one. Aaron Rodgers, previously the backup, became the starting quarterback when Brett Favre announced his retirement in March. Favre then changed his mind and sought his previous position as the Green Bay quarterback. The organization reiterated its intent to move forward with Rodgers as the new face of the Packers, although Favre was offered the backup position behind Rodgers. Favre refused the offer, and was traded to the New York Jets in exchange for a conditional fourth-round draft pick.

The 2008 season started with a 5–5 record, followed by five consecutive losses. The season ended with a 31–21 victory over the Detroit Lions, bringing the Packers' regular season record to 6–10. The Packers finished third in the NFC North, ahead of only the Lions, and did not make the playoffs. Under McCarthy, Aaron Rodgers threw for over 4,000 yards and posted a 93.8 passer rating.

Rodgers improved on his 2008 statistics in 2009, but was sacked 50 times, more than any other quarterback in the NFL. The Packers dominated teams with losing records but were swept by their rival Minnesota Vikings, led by former Packers franchise quarterback Brett Favre. The Packers lost to the previously winless Tampa Bay Buccaneers, but then came back to beat the NFC East-leading Dallas Cowboys. They then went on a five-game winning streak and qualified for the playoffs with a Week 17 victory over the Arizona Cardinals, finishing with an 11–5 record. This was the second playoff berth in McCarthy's tenure. However, the Packers lost to the Cardinals in overtime 51–45 during the Wild Card Round.

==== 2010 ====
In 2010, the Packers had 25 players on the injured reserve list throughout the season. Running back Ryan Grant sustained an injury in week one that sidelined him for the rest of the season. McCarthy nonetheless led the Packers to a 10–6 regular season finish, never losing by more than four points and never trailing by more than 7 throughout the entire season. This record earned them second place in the NFC North, behind the Chicago Bears, with whom they split victories in the regular season.

They went into the NFC playoffs as the sixth seed. The Packers defeated the number three-seeded Philadelphia Eagles by a 21–16 score in the wild card round. They then played the number one-seeded Atlanta Falcons, beating them by a convincing margin of 48–21.

The Packers then played the Chicago Bears for the third time that season in the NFC Championship Game. They won 21–14 and advanced to Super Bowl XLV. After this game, McCarthy's team had a 3–0 postseason record on the road.

===== Super Bowl XLV =====
Super Bowl XLV pitted the Packers against the Pittsburgh Steelers, marking the first time the two storied franchises played each other in the postseason. Ahead of the game, confident in his team's performance, McCarthy had the team fitted for Super Bowl championship rings.

The Packers defeated the Steelers 31–25 to win their fourth Super Bowl and 13th NFL title overall. The win returned the Lombardi Trophy to Green Bay for the first time since 1996.

==== 2011–2017 ====
The 2011 Packers team was a record-setting one, leading the NFL in points scored and setting a franchise record for wins at 15–1 and consecutive wins. McCarthy's offensive strategies facilitated Aaron Rodgers' NFL MVP season, as he threw for 4,643 yards and 45 touchdowns, throwing most often to receiver Jordy Nelson.

The Packers' season ended in the NFC Divisional Round against the New York Giants. The team had suffered a number of setbacks, including the neck injury to Nick Collins, and appeared to have suffered, rather than benefited, from the time off, dropping nine passes in this game. Eli Manning of the Giants attacked the Packers’ weaker defense (ranked 19th in scoring defense) and the Packers lost 37–20.

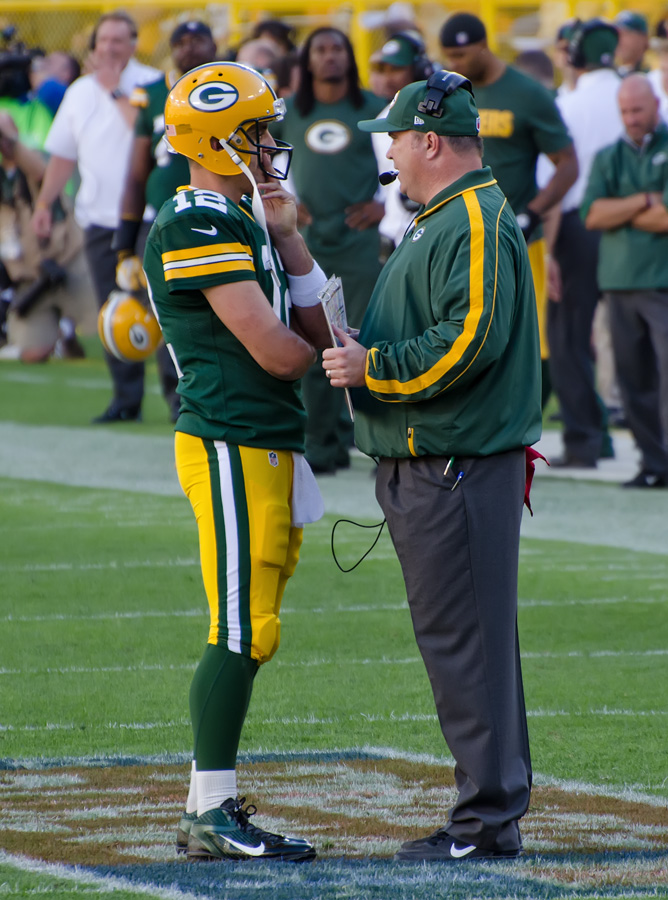
McCarthy and quarterback Aaron Rodgers in 2012

In 2012, the Packers finished with an 11–5 record that ranked them first in the NFC North Division, the first time the Packers had won two consecutive NFC North titles since the three they won from 2002 to 2004. McCarthy's offensive strategies led to the Packers scoring 433 points, with Aaron Rodgers passing for 4,295 yards. The 2012 playoffs was the 28th time the franchise had secured a playoff berth. After beating the Minnesota Vikings in the first round, the Packers lost on the road to the San Francisco 49ers in the Divisional Round by a score of 45–31.

In 2013, McCarthy led the Packers to a regular season record of 8–7–1 and the NFC North title, the third consecutive division win. That year, McCarthy took his team to their fifth straight playoff appearance. During the summer of 2014, the village board of Ashwaubenon, Wisconsin voted to rename Potts Avenue “Mike McCarthy Way.”

In 2014, McCarthy guided the Packers to their fourth consecutive NFC North title with a 12–4 record. The team ranked sixth in the NFL in total offense, with an average of 386 yards per game, and first in points scored, with an average of 30.4 points per game. In receiving yards, Jordy Nelson led the team with 1,519 yards. Aaron Rodgers threw for 4,381 yards and Eddie Lacy had 1,139 rushing yards.

In November 2014, McCarthy signed a contract extension through 2018. With a Week 16 victory over the Tampa Bay Buccaneers, McCarthy notched his 99th win, passing Hall of Famer Vince Lombardi (98) for second on the Packers' all-time wins list, behind only Hall of Famer Curly Lambeau (212).

The Packers defeated the Dallas Cowboys in the Divisional Round of the playoffs, but in the NFC Championship Game against the Seattle Seahawks, the Packers collapsed. Despite holding a 16–0 lead at halftime and a 19–7 lead in the final minutes of the fourth quarter, the Packers went on to lose the 28–22 in overtime. McCarthy was criticized after making several questionable play calls during this loss. At the start of the game, he went for two field goals at the one-yard line, and was criticized for "not going for it". During the last five minutes of the game, McCarthy called three run plays to Eddie Lacy with 3:52 minutes left, and the Packers punted on fourth down; critics slammed McCarthy for "not giving Aaron Rodgers a chance" to win the game. A day after the loss, McCarthy stated that he is "not questioning his play-calling", as well as stating that he "came to run the ball". Others defended McCarthy; in March 2015, at the annual owners' meetings, Bill Belichick stated that McCarthy is "one of the best coaches I've ever gone up against." McCarthy relinquished play calling duties to long-time assistant Tom Clements in February 2015.

While the Packers made the playoffs for the seventh consecutive time after the 2015 season, the team struggled with a weak running game. In December, McCarthy once again took over play calling responsibilities. After he did so, the Packers recorded a 28–7 victory over the Dallas Cowboys, running the ball for 230 yards.

The 2016 season made McCarthy the fourth head coach in the history of the NFL to take his team to eight-plus consecutive playoff appearances. In the postseason, the Packers won in the Wild Card Round against the New York Giants (38–13) and then in the Divisional Round against the Dallas Cowboys (34–31) before losing on the road to the Atlanta Falcons in the NFC Championship Game (44–21).

The Packers began the 2017 season with a 4–1 record, but was later hamstrung by a collarbone injury to Rodgers in Week 6 against the Minnesota Vikings. Afterwards, backup quarterback Brett Hundley made his first career start. With only a backup quarterback to work with, McCarthy and the Packers failed to clinch a postseason appearance in 2017, finishing with a 7–9 record.

==== 2018 ====
On January 2, 2018, it was announced that McCarthy had signed a one-year contract extension with the Packers.

On December 2, 2018, after a 20–17 loss to the Arizona Cardinals, McCarthy was fired after 13 seasons as head coach. He finished his Packers tenure with a 125–77–2 (.618) regular season record and a 10–8 (.556) postseason record for a combined record of 135–85–2 (.613). McCarthy led the team to nine playoff appearances and a Super Bowl victory.

The timing of the personnel decision caught McCarthy by surprise, as he noted in an interview with ESPN.com. McCarthy said: "Time provides the opportunity for reflection and clarity and that's where I'm at now. And it's clear to me now that both sides needed a change."

=== 2019 hiatus ===
After McCarthy was released as Packers head coach, he expressed plans to interview with the New York Jets and Cleveland Browns. The Arizona Cardinals expressed interest, but McCarthy declined to proceed with an interview.

McCarthy's interview with the Browns was initially scheduled for January 3, 2019, before being moved to a week later. The Browns offered McCarthy the head coach position, but he declined it, because it would have required him to retain Freddie Kitchens as offensive coordinator. The Browns hired Kitchens instead.

McCarthy interviewed with the Jets on January 5, 2019. The Jets also interviewed Chiefs offensive coordinator Eric Bieniemy and former Miami Dolphins coach Adam Gase. The Jets proceeded to hire Gase.

On January 9, 2019, McCarthy announced that he intended to sit out the 2019 season and return for 2020. McCarthy spent time improving his football knowledge and strategies. In collaboration with fellow coaches such as Jim Haslett, Frank Cignetti Jr. and Scott McCurley, McCarthy studied league playbooks, league trends, and analytics, with the intention of returning to the NFL. He said that his "McCarthy Project" made him "definitely a better coach".

=== Dallas Cowboys ===
==== 2020 ====
McCarthy interviewed for the vacant head coach position to replace Jason Garrett, which took place over 12 hours, with Cowboys owner Jerry Jones, executive vice president Stephen Jones, and chief sales and marketing officer Jerry Jones Jr. The other person to interview for the position was Marvin Lewis.

On January 7, 2020, McCarthy was announced as the Cowboys' new head coach. McCarthy, who spent his season off watching game film and learning about analytics with fellow coaches, told Jones during the interview that he watched every play of the 2019 season. During his introductory press conference to announce his hiring, McCarthy said: “I need to confess: I told Jerry I watched every play of the 2019 season. I wanted the job. You do what you gotta do, right?”

McCarthy was the Cowboys' ninth head coach since the organization was founded in 1960. On September 13, 2020, McCarthy lost his Cowboys head coaching debut against the Los Angeles Rams on the road by a score of 20–17. In the next game, McCarthy received his first win as the Cowboys' head coach in a narrow 40–39 comeback victory over the Atlanta Falcons.

McCarthy was challenged by the heavy restrictions imposed in the league due to the COVID-19 pandemic in terms of physical contact with the players, their availability due to a positive test for the virus or having been exposed to someone who had it, a reduced training camp schedule and the cancellation of the preseason games, which complicated the implementation of the new offensive and defensive schemes. Aggravating the situation was the poor showing of most of the team's free agent signings.

The Cowboys finished the season with a 6–10 record, placing third in the NFC East. After losing starting quarterback Dak Prescott to a dislocated ankle in a Week 5 37–34 victory over the New York Giants, the Cowboys still remained in playoff contention in a weak division and with Andy Dalton as the starter at quarterback for most of the season. However, the team struggled defensively, allowing 473 points, which was the Cowboys' worst . After the season, the Cowboys fired defensive coordinator Mike Nolan and defensive line coach Jim Tomsula.

==== 2021 ====
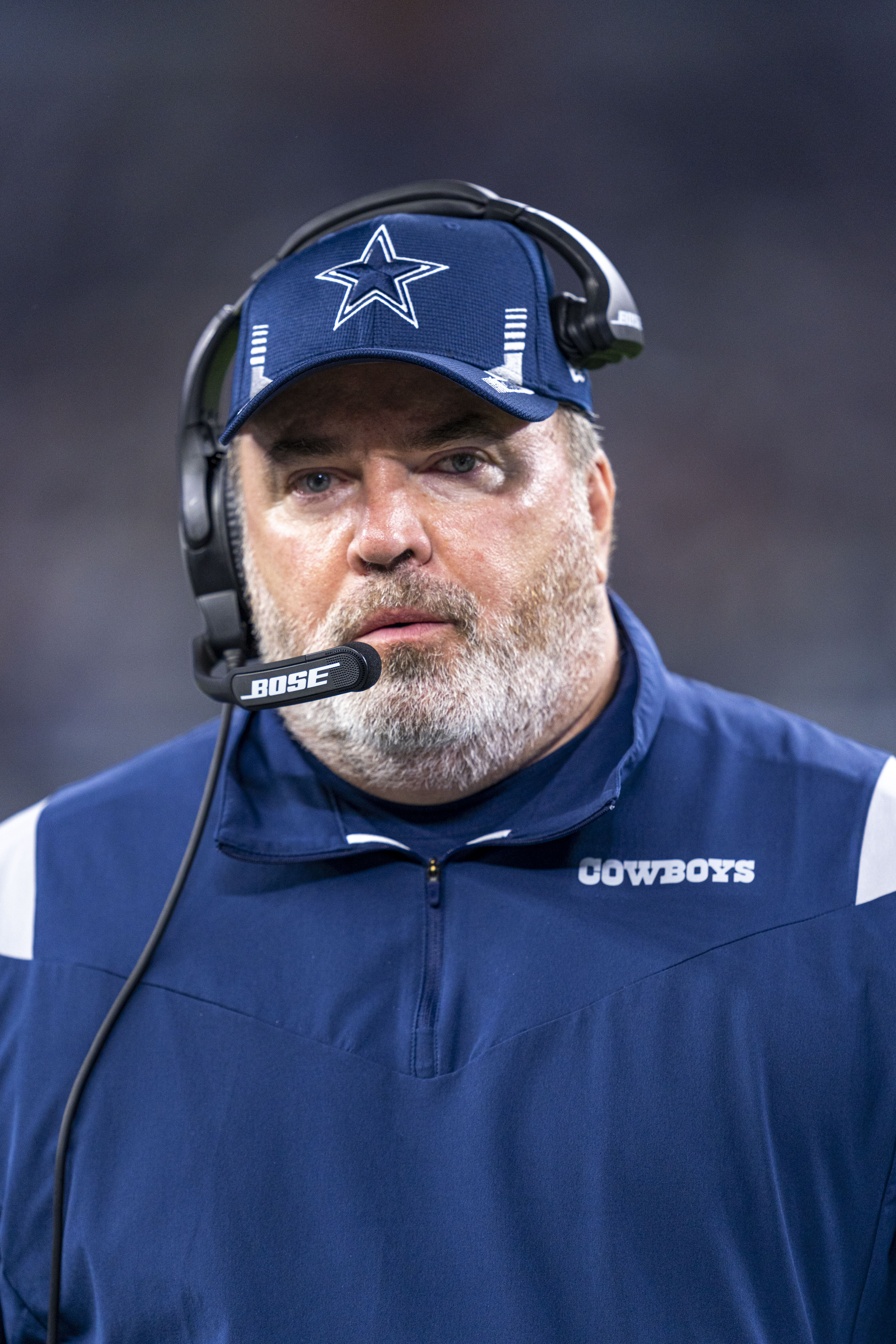
McCarthy in 2021

McCarthy was fined $50,000 by the NFL on July 1, 2021, for violating practice rules during organized team activities. As a result of the fine, McCarthy said in a statement the majority of the seven to nine plays the NFL discussed with him involved younger players.

From July through September 2021, McCarthy and the Cowboys were featured on the HBO sports documentary Hard Knocks. The experience, which McCarthy called "a good one," involved a large camera crew filming the entirety of Cowboys training camp.

For the 2021 season, McCarthy guided the team to a 12–5 record and an NFC East division title, including sweeping the entire NFC East for the first time since 1998. After a Week 9 30–16 loss to the Denver Broncos, McCarthy displayed a can of Anti-Monkey Butt powder in a presentation to the team. He informed the Cowboys that although the prior week's loss had been a "Red Ass Week," McCarthy was confident his team would stage a comeback. McCarthy missed the Week 13 27–17 road victory over the New Orleans Saints after testing positive for COVID-19 and was placed in COVID protocols for 10 days. The Cowboys were upset at home 23–17 by the San Francisco 49ers in the playoffs in the wild-card round. The game ended with the clock running out on the Cowboys following a quarterback draw as they attempted to spike the ball to stop the clock to permit a final pass play.

McCarthy was particularly criticized for his decision to use a quarterback draw with 14 seconds left in the fourth quarter, instead of going for two or more passes from further out. McCarthy defended his decision, explaining that he was hoping to get another, easier play in after coming closer to the end zone and that he thought that 14 seconds was sufficient to allow his team to do this.

==== 2022 ====
Before the 2022 season, McCarthy was fined $100,000 by the NFL for violating offseason practice rules. He canceled a preseason practice instead holding a team bonding golf event.

For the 2022 season, McCarthy led the Cowboys to a 12–5 record, tying the 2021 season record and placing second in the NFC East. During the season-opening loss to the Tampa Bay Buccaneers, quarterback Dak Prescott suffered a thumb fracture that required surgery and absence from the team until Week 7. McCarthy replaced him with backup quarterback Cooper Rush who went 4–1 over the next five games. McCarthy dealt with other injuries from key players including safety Jayron Kearse and left tackle Tyron Smith. Before a Week 9 game against the Packers, McCarthy got emotional about a return to Green Bay. He also said he was looking forward to seeing Aaron Rodgers.

McCarthy led the Cowboys to a 31–14 road victory in the Wild Card Round against the Buccaneers, which was Tom Brady's last game of his career and the club's first road playoff victory in over 30 years. Playing against the San Francisco 49ers on the road, the Cowboys lost for the second year in a row to their longtime rival by a score of 19–12 and extended the franchise's streak to seven straight defeats in the Divisional Round of the playoffs.

==== 2023 ====
In January 2023, McCarthy announced that the Cowboys would be parting ways with offensive coordinator Kellen Moore. He also parted ways with six other coaches. In February 2023, team owner Jerry Jones stated that McCarthy would call plays during the following season. McCarthy new hires included offensive coordinator Brian Schottenheimer.

The Cowboys overpowered opposing teams with its offense, boasting a top 5 rank in total yards and scoring. Prescott flourished and CeeDee Lamb emerged as one of the league's best wide receivers. The Cowboys were ranked second heading to the NFC playoffs and faced McCarthy's old team the Green Bay Packers at home, but the wild-card matchup against the youngest team in the league ended in embarrassment. Dallas experienced a 27-0 deficit before halftime, before losing in a 48-32 blowout. The result brought forth questions about McCarthy's job security, that forced Cowboys owner Jerry Jones to release a statement confirming that he would retain McCarthy as head coach, saying the team is "very close and capable of achieving our ultimate goals." The Cowboys also became the first team in the Super Bowl era to win 12 games in three straight seasons but not be able to reach a conference title game in that stretch.

==== 2024 ====
McCarthy's return set up a difficult dynamic, where he and his entire coaching staff entered the last year of their contracts, without the possibility of an extension. He also was forced to replace defensive coordinator Dan Quinn who took the head coach position with the Washington Commanders with Mike Zimmer. The team lost depth and didn't have any important signing in free agency, ending with a roster that wasn't set up to succeed, even though Jones used the term "all-in" to describe the Cowboys' approach in 2024.

The team won their season opener against the Cleveland Browns by a score of 33–17. This win would be seemingly in vain, as they lost three of their next five matchups. These included a 44–19 blowout loss in week 2 to the New Orleans Saints, as well as a 47–9 blowout loss to the Detroit Lions in Week 6. After the bye, they would not bounce back, losing four straight. Even worse, in week 9, starting quarterback Dak Prescott tore his hamstring. Playing backups Cooper Rush and Trey Lance, the Cowboys finished 7–10.

On January 13, 2025, Jones announced that the Cowboys and McCarthy had mutually agreed to part ways after the two parties ran into an impasse on new contract terms.

=== Pittsburgh Steelers ===
==== 2026 ====
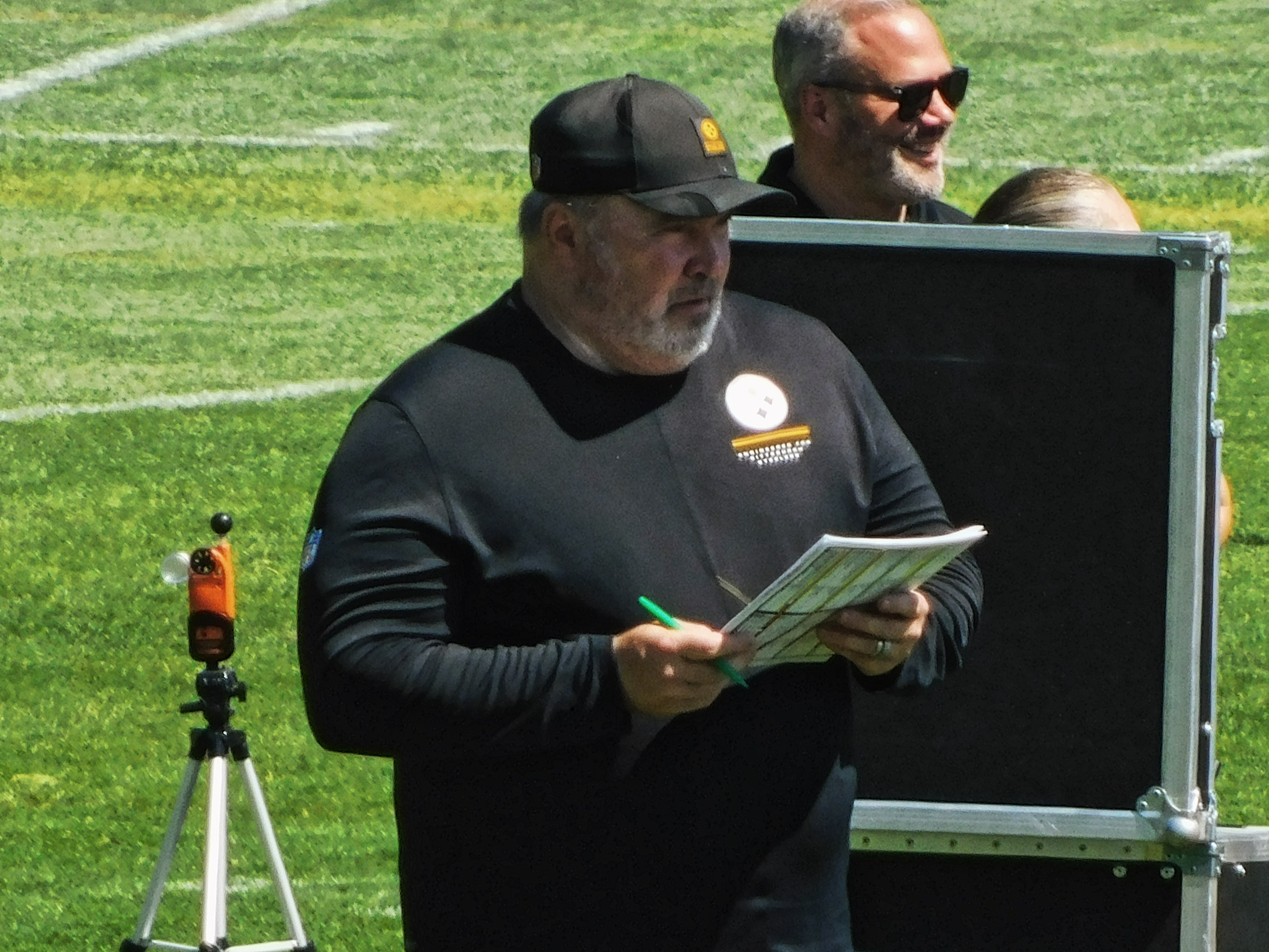
McCarthy during his inaugural training camp with the Pittsburgh Steelers in 2026

On January 24, 2026, McCarthy was hired by the Pittsburgh Steelers as the 17th head coach in franchise history, succeeding Mike Tomlin. He is only the fourth man to lead the Steelers since 1969.

== Awards ==
In 2007, McCarthy was voted the Motorola NFL Coach of the Year after twice receiving Coach of the Week awards. He was also named the NFL Alumni's Coach of the Year by a group of former players.

In 2008, McCarthy received the distinguished service award at the Lee Remmel sports awards banquet in Green Bay. McCarthy was selected as National Football Conference (NFC) Assistant Coach of the Year by USA Today in 2000.

== Personal life ==
In 1995, McCarthy and his high school sweetheart, Christine, amicably divorced. On March 15, 2008, McCarthy married Jessica Kress. They have five children between them; two sons from Jessica's previous marriage, a daughter from McCarthy's previous marriage and two daughters together.

McCarthy and his wife Jessica have a history of giving back to communities and people in need. The couple were involved with the Seven Loaves Project in Rwanda. They founded the McCarthy Family Foundation, a charitable nonprofit. The McCarthy Family Foundation has donated frequently to the American Family Children's Hospital in Madison, Wisconsin. McCarthy hosts an annual golf tournament to benefit the hospital, and his foundation's fundraising was integral for the building of the hospital's Surgical Neonatal Intensive Care Unit. The Foundation has donated to the MVP Foundation which brings together combat veterans and former professional athletes as they transition to a new life off the field.

The foundation has also donated $100,000 (which the Green Bay Packers matched) to the Green Bay Police Foundation. The funds were used to purchase protective equipment for police officers in the area. The money was also spent on outreach programs intended to build community relations, and on bias prevention training for the officers.

== Head coaching record ==
Team	Year	Regular season					Postseason			
Team	Year	Won	Lost	Ties	Win %	Finish	Won	Lost	Win %	Result
GB	2006	8	8	0	.500	2nd in NFC North	—	—	—	—
GB	2007	13	3	0	.813	1st in NFC North	1	1	.500	Lost to New York Giants in NFC Championship Game
GB	2008	6	10	0	.375	3rd in NFC North	—	—	—	—
GB	2009	11	5	0	.688	2nd in NFC North	0	1	.000	Lost to Arizona Cardinals in NFC Wild Card Game
GB	2010	10	6	0	.625	2nd in NFC North	4	0	1.000	Super Bowl XLV champions
GB	2011	15	1	0	.938	1st in NFC North	0	1	.000	Lost to New York Giants in NFC Divisional Game
GB	2012	11	5	0	.688	1st in NFC North	1	1	.500	Lost to San Francisco 49ers in NFC Divisional Game
GB	2013	8	7	1	.531	1st in NFC North	0	1	.000	Lost to San Francisco 49ers in NFC Wild Card Game
GB	2014	12	4	0	.750	1st in NFC North	1	1	.500	Lost to Seattle Seahawks in NFC Championship Game
GB	2015	10	6	0	.625	2nd in NFC North	1	1	.500	Lost to Arizona Cardinals in NFC Divisional Game
GB	2016	10	6	0	.625	1st in NFC North	2	1	.667	Lost to Atlanta Falcons in NFC Championship Game
GB	2017	7	9	0	.438	3rd in NFC North	—	—	—	—
GB	2018	4	7	1	.375	Fired	—	—	—	—
GB total		125	77	2	.618		10	8	.556	
DAL	2020	6	10	0	.375	3rd in NFC East	—	—	—	—
DAL	2021	12	5	0	.706	1st in NFC East	0	1	.000	Lost to San Francisco 49ers in NFC Wild Card Game
DAL	2022	12	5	0	.706	2nd in NFC East	1	1	.500	Lost to San Francisco 49ers in NFC Divisional Game
DAL	2023	12	5	0	.706	1st in NFC East	0	1	.000	Lost to Green Bay Packers in NFC Wild Card Game
DAL	2024	7	10	0	.412	3rd in NFC East	—	—	—	—
DAL total		49	35	0	.583		1	3	.250	
PIT	2026	6	2	0	.750	TBD in AFC North	—	—	—	—
PIT total		6	2	0	.750		0	0	–	
Total		180	114	2	.610		11	11	.500	
