= Ryder Center =

Athletics and recreational complex

- Interactive map of Ryder Center
- Address: 7400 Bay Rd
- Location: University Center, Michigan
- Coordinates: 43°33′33.93″N 83°59′3.4944″W
- Owner: Saginaw Valley State University
- Type: Arena, Recreation center

Website
- Official website

Ryder Center for Health and Physical Education is an athletics and recreational complex located on the campus of Saginaw Valley State University in University Center, Michigan, United States. It was built in 1985 and is home to SVSU Cardinals sports teams.

The Ryder Center includes:

- The Fieldhouse is a premiere facility offering an 85-yard football field with field turf surface, 300-meter indoor track with timing booth for all indoor track meets and four full batting cages for baseball & softball training. The fieldhouse is connected to all other amenities of the Ryder Center and is the second facility of its kind at the NCAA Division II level.
- Campus Recreation Center/Fitness Center The Fitness Center encompasses over 63,000 sq. ft. offering fitness machines, free weights, walking/running track, and three basketball courts. In addition, racquetball courts, practice fields, a dance studio and other multi-use rooms are available at the Ryder Center.
- Hamilton Gymnasium a 620-seat volleyball gymnasium with 9,919 square feet (922 m^{2}) of space.
- James E. O'Neill Arena, the flagship facility of the complex and a 3,500-seat indoor arena used for basketball; it can seat up to 4,932 for concerts and features 11,284 square feet (1,048 m^{2}) of space.
- O’Neill Arena Indoor Track & Field,

   Seating Capacity: 531
   Dimensions: 60,970 sq ft.
   Features:
   6-lane, 200 meter indoor track
   8-lane, 100 meter straight away
   Voice quality public address sound system
   1 long jump pit
   1 pole vault pit

- Gerstacker Regional Aquatic Center, The premiere aquatic center of the Great Lakes Bay Region featuring an eight-lane, 50-meter pool with two 1-meter boards and a 3-meter board and a Daktronics timing system with full-color message board.

The Center is also used for conventions and trade shows.

Outdoor facilities include Wickes Stadium, ten tennis courts, a 384-seat baseball field, a 384-seat softball field and a 270-seat soccer field.
