= Jim Collins (American football coach) =

American football player and coach (born 1966)

Biographical details
- Born: September 8, 1966 (age 60)

Playing career
- 1984–1987: Wittenberg
- Position: Wide receiver

Coaching career (HC unless noted)
- 1989–1990: Central Michigan (GA)
- 1991–1993: Illinois Wesleyan (OC)
- 1994–1996: Dubuque
- 1997–2007: Capital (OH)
- 2008–2018: Saginaw Valley State
- 2019: Army (DPP)
- 2020–2021: Dayton (OC/QB)
- 2022–2025: Wittenberg

Head coaching record
- Overall: 155–150
- Tournaments: 4–3 (NCAA D-III playoffs); 0–3 (NCAA D-II playoffs)

Accomplishments and honors

Championships
- 3 GLAIC North Division (2011–2013)

Awards
- 3× OAC Coach of the Year (2001, 2003, 2006); AFCA Division III Regional Coach of the Year (2005); Ohio College Coach of the Year (2006)

Jim Collins (born September 8, 1966) is an American college football coach and former player. Collins served as head football coach at the University of Dubuque in Dubuque, Iowa from 1994 to 1996, Capital University in Bexley, Ohio from 1997 to 2007, Saginaw Valley State University in University Center, Michigan from 2008 to 2018, and Wittenberg University in Springfield, Ohio from 2022 to 2025. He was the director of player personnel for the Army Black Knights of the United States Military Academy in 2019 and he offensive coordinator and quarterbacks coach for the Dayton Flyers from 2020 to 2021.

== Coaching career ==
Collins most recently served as the head coach for the Wittenberg Tigers. He is the former offensive coordinator and quarterbacks coach for Dayton and the director of player personnel for the Army Black Knights football program, being announced for the position by the West Point Athletics Department on March 19, 2019.

His previous position was as the head football coach at Saginaw Valley State University in University Center, Michigan. Saginaw Valley made the playoffs three times during Collins' tenure (2009, 2011, and 2013). Prior to that as the head football coach at Capital University, Collins recorded 66 wins and 51 losses in 11 seasons, which ranks him second all time in wins and second in all-time winning percentage (.564) for the school. Capital made the NCAA Division III playoffs in each of Collins' last three seasons.

== Head coaching record ==
Year	Team	Overall	Conference	Standing	Bowl/playoffs	AFCA^{#}
Dubuque Spartans (Iowa Intercollegiate Athletic Conference) (1994–1996)
1994	Dubuque	1–9	1–7	8th		
1995	Dubuque	2–8	2–6	T–6th		
1996	Dubuque	1–9	0–8	9th		
Dubuque:		4–26	3–21			
Capital Crusaders (Ohio Athletic Conference) (1997–2007)
1997	Capital	3–7	2–7	T–7th		
1998	Capital	1–9	0–9	10th		
1999	Capital	2–8	2–7	T–7th		
2000	Capital	3–7	2–7	T–8th		
2001	Capital	7–3	6–3	T–3rd		
2002	Capital	6–4	6–3	4th		
2003	Capital	8–2	7–2	3rd		
2004	Capital	7–3	6–3	T–3rd		
2005	Capital	10–3	7–2	T–2nd	L NCAA Division III Quarterfinal	
2006	Capital	11–2	8–1	2nd	L NCAA Division III Quarterfinal	
2007	Capital	8–3	7–2	2nd	L NCAA Division III First Round	
Capital:		66–51	53–46			
Saginaw Valley State (Great Lakes Intercollegiate Athletic Conference) (2008–2018)
2008	Saginaw Valley State	7–3	7–3	T–3rd		
2009	Saginaw Valley State	9–3	8–2	T–2nd	L NCAA Division II First Round	19
2010	Saginaw Valley State	4–7	4–7	7th (North)		
2011	Saginaw Valley State	7–4	7–3	T–1st (North)	L NCAA Division II First Round	
2012	Saginaw Valley State	8–3	7–3	T–1st (North)		
2013	Saginaw Valley State	9–3	9–1	1st (North)	L NCAA Division II First Round	22
2014	Saginaw Valley State	2–9	2–8	7th (North)		
2015	Saginaw Valley State	1–10	1–9	8th (North)		
2016	Saginaw Valley State	5–5	5–5	4th (North)		
2017	Saginaw Valley State	5–6	3–6	T–7th		
2018	Saginaw Valley State	8–3	5–3	4th		
Saginaw Valley State:		65–56	58–50			
Wittenberg Tigers (North Coast Athletic Conference) (2022–2025)
2022	Wittenberg	5–5	4–4	T–5th		
2023	Wittenberg	7–3	6–2	T–2nd		
2024	Wittenberg	6–4	5–3	4th		
2025	Wittenberg	2–5 (Note: Wittenberg fired Collins after seven games)	1–4			
Wittenberg:		20–17	16–13			
Total:		155–150				
National championship Conference title Conference division title or championship game berth
^{#}Rankings from final AFCA Division II poll.
