= Hail Larry =

2016 NFL postseason game

Green Bay Packers (5) (10–6)	Arizona Cardinals (2) (13–3)
20	26
Head coach: Mike McCarthy	Head coach: Bruce Arians
	1	2	3	4	OT	Total
GB	0	6	7	7	0	20
ARI	7	0	3	10	6	26
- Date: January 16, 2016
- Stadium: University of Phoenix Stadium; Glendale, Arizona, U.S.
- Favorite: Cardinals by 7
- Referee: Clete Blakeman
- Attendance: 65,089

TV in the United States
- Network: NBC
- Announcers: Al Michaels, Cris Collinsworth, and Michele Tafoya

Hail Larry was a National Football League (NFL) Divisional Playoff game between the Green Bay Packers and Arizona Cardinals on January 16, 2016. The game, which was contested at the University of Phoenix Stadium in Glendale, Arizona, became notable after its dramatic conclusion in the fourth quarter and overtime. The Packers made the playoffs as a Wild Card team, beating the Washington Redskins 35–18 in the first round. The Cardinals won the NFC West division, and thus were given homefield advantage against the Packers, who they were hosting in the Divisional round. The game went back-and-forth, with the Cardinals kicking a field goal with just under two minutes left in the fourth quarter to take a 7-point lead. The Packers regained possession but faced a fourth down with 20 yards to go after two incompletions and a sack. On fourth down, Aaron Rodgers completed a 60-yard pass to Jeff Janis for the first down. After running two plays, the game clock was down to five seconds; Rodgers snapped the ball, rolled to his left and threw a Hail Mary pass into the end zone, which was caught again by Janis for a game-tying touchdown.

The coin toss to determine possession of the ball to start overtime had to be redone because it did not flip in the air. The Cardinals ultimately won the coin toss and started with the ball. On the first play, Carson Palmer evaded a sack and threw a short pass across the field to Larry Fitzgerald, who ran the ball to the five-yard line for a 75-yard gain. The next play was an incompletion; on second down Palmer flipped a shovel pass to Fitzgerald who dove into the end zone for a walk-off touchdown. The Cardinals advanced to the 2015 NFC Championship Game, where they lost to the Carolina Panthers. The game was described as one of the most thrilling playoff games in NFL history. Rodgers' Hail Mary was the second one he completed during the 2015 season, after the Miracle in Motown game. The next day, the Arizona Republic printed a full page spread titled "Hail Larry" in recognition of Fitzgerald's performance, while also referencing Rodgers' earlier completion. Rodgers' Hail Mary and Fitzgerald's overtime catch were recognized as two of the greatest plays in NFL history, while the overall game was also recognized as one of the greatest games in league history.

== Background ==
The Green Bay Packers had a record of 10–6 in the 2015 NFL season, good enough for second place in the NFC North. The Packers were led by quarterback Aaron Rodgers, who had a down year statistically based on his career averages, while also having no wide receiver or running back accumulate over 1,000 yards. One of the Packers losses, in Week 16, was a 38–8 blowout loss to the Arizona Cardinals. The Cardinals went 13–3 in 2015, winning the NFC West and securing the second seed in the playoffs, behind the Carolina Panthers. The Cardinals were led by quarterback Carson Palmer, who was in the top 5 in the league for passing yards, passing touchdowns and passer rating. Larry Fitzgerald was the Cardinals' leading receiver, ranking in the top 10 in the league for receptions and receiving yards.

The Packers secured the fifth seed, a Wild Card spot, in the playoffs. During the Wild Card round, they faced the Washington Redskins. After facing an early 11–0 deficit, the Packers came back, winning 35–18 and advancing to the Divisional Round. With the higher seed, the Cardinals, who had a bye week during the Wild Card round, secured home-field advantage, hosting the Packers at the University of Phoenix Stadium in Glendale, Arizona, for their Divisional Round match-up. The Cardinals were favored to win by seven points.

== Game summary ==
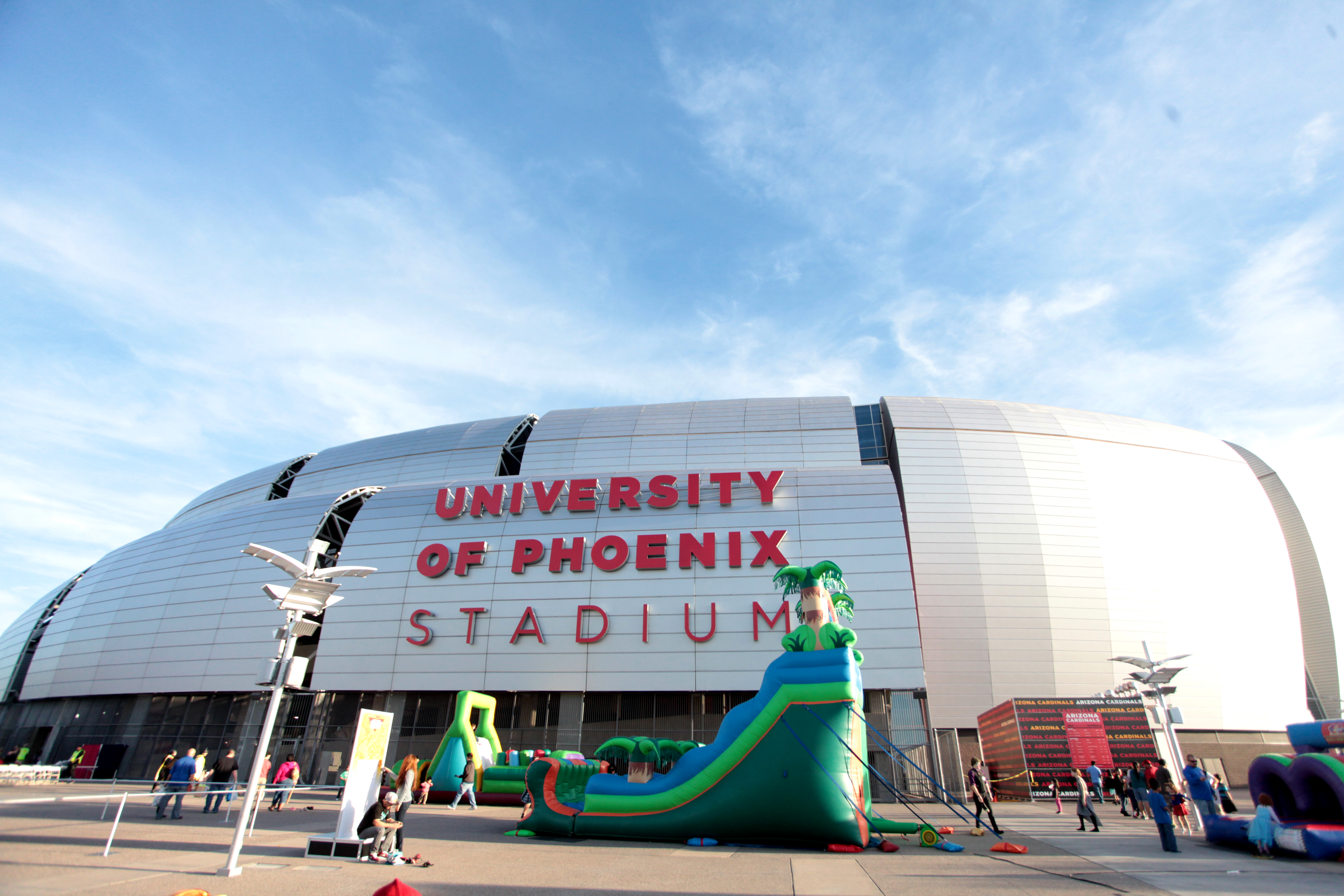
University of Phoenix Stadium, shown here in 2014, was the site of the playoff game.

=== First half ===
The Cardinals began the game with possession, going three-and-out. After punting, the Packers also went three-and-out, giving the Cardinals the ball at mid-field. They drove 42 yards in 11 plays, culminating in an 8-yard touchdown pass from Palmer to Michael Floyd. Both teams again exchanged going three-and-out, each drive ending in a punt. The Packers then proceeded to drive 85 yards over 17 plays, with penalties on each team erasing big plays. A 51-yard catch by Randall Cobb was erased on offsetting penalties, while a 100-yard interception return by the Cardinals was overturned by an illegal use of the hands penalty. The Packers settled for a field goal at the eight yard line, bringing the score to 7–3, with the Cardinals in the lead. After a short drive by the Cardinals ended in a punt, the Packers again drove the length of the field before getting stopped and settling for a field goal. After the Cardinals ran out the rest of the game clock, the score going into halftime was 7–6.

=== Second half ===
The Packers started the second half with the ball, however Rodgers threw an interception on the third play of the drive. The Packers quickly got the ball back though, getting their own interception of a Palmer pass. The Packers then drove the length of the field, punctuated by a 61-yard rush by Eddie Lacy. The drive ended in an eight-yard touchdown pass from Rodgers to Jeff Janis, giving the Packers their first lead of the game, 13–7. The Cardinals responded with a long scoring drive of their own, with Fitzgerald catching three passes for 55 yards on the drive. After an illegal blindside block late in the drive by Fitzgerald, the Cardinals settled for a field goal, closing their deficit to three. On the ensuing drive, the Packers went three-and-out and punted. The Cardinals drove down the length of the field on their next drive, but the Packers intercepted Palmer again, this time in the end zone for a touchback. The Packers drove to mid-field, with Rodgers completing a 34-yard pass to Richard Rodgers. The Cardinals challenged the call on the field, which was reversed. Facing fourth down, the Packers punted the ball. The Cardinals engineered an 80-yard, 14-play drive, ending in another Palmer-to-Floyd touchdown catch, regaining the lead 17–13. The Packers next drive only gained five yards; after going for it and failing on fourth down, the Packers turned the ball over on downs to the Cardinals with just over two minutes left in the game. The Packers defense held though, forcing a field goal attempt by the Cardinals. The successful attempt increased their lead to 20–13.

With just under two minutes left in the game, the Packers began their drive at the 14-yard line. Rodgers threw an incomplete pass, got sacked, and then threw another incomplete pass. Facing fourth down with 20 yards to go and only 55 seconds left on the clock, Rodgers rolled to his left and from his own end zone threw a deep pass to Janis along the sideline, who caught the ball for a 60-yard gain. Rodgers tried to fake a spike on the next play, but threw incomplete. However, the Packers were lined up incorrectly and were assessed a five-yard penalty. Rodgers threw an incomplete pass on the next play. With only five seconds left on the clock and the Packers at the 41-yard line, Rodgers snapped the ball and immediately rolled to his left. Under pressure from the Cardinals pass rushers, Rodgers threw a deep, arcing ball, right before being hit towards the end zone. Janis leapt and caught the ball, securing possession the whole way to the ground. With the ensuing extra point, the Packers tied the game, forcing overtime.

=== Overtime ===
The Cardinals won the overtime coin toss and chose to receive the ball. After a touchback, the Cardinals began the drive at their own 20-yard line. On the first play, Palmer completed a short pass to Fitzgerald just prior to being sacked. The ball traveled across the field, with Fitzgerald breaking multiple tackles until he was tackled on the five-yard line for a 75-yard gain. After an incomplete pass, the Cardinals put Fitzgerald in motion; Palmer snapped the ball and quickly shoveled the ball to Fitzgerald who dove into the end zone for a game-winning touchdown.

=== Box score ===
NFC Divisional Playoffs: (5) Green Bay Packers at (2) Arizona Cardinals – Game summary

Quarter	1	2	3	4	OT	Total
Packers	0	6	7	7	0	20
Cardinals	7	0	3	10	6	26

at University of Phoenix Stadium in Glendale, Arizona

- Date: January 16, 2016
- Game time: 8:15 PM EST/6:15 PM MST
- Game weather: Played indoors (retractable roof closed)
- Game attendance: 65,089
- Referee: Clete Blakeman
- TV announcers (NBC): Al Michaels, Cris Collinsworth, and Michele Tafoya
- Sources: Pro-Football-Reference.com and ESPN.com

Game information

1st quarter

- ARI – Michael Floyd 8-yard pass from Carson Palmer (Chandler Catanzaro kick), 6:48. Cardinals 7–0. Drive: 11 plays, 42 yards, 6:21.

2nd quarter

- GB – Mason Crosby 28-yard field goal, 11:22. Cardinals 7–3. Drive: 17 plays, 85 yards, 7:31.
- GB – Mason Crosby 34-yard field goal, 0:57. Cardinals 7–6. Drive: 17 plays, 71 yards, 7:55.

3rd quarter

- GB – Jeff Janis 8-yard pass from Aaron Rodgers (Mason Crosby kick), 10:17. Packers 13–7. Drive: 6 plays, 81 yards, 3:05.
- ARI – Chandler Catanzaro 28-yard field goal, 5:05. Packers 13–10. Drive: 10 plays, 74 yards, 5:12.

4th quarter

- ARI – Michael Floyd 9-yard pass from Carson Palmer (Chandler Catanzaro kick), 3:44. Cardinals 17–13. Drive: 14 plays, 80 yards, 7:09.
- ARI – Chandler Catanzaro 36-yard field goal, 1:55. Cardinals 20–13. Drive: 4 plays, 6 yards, 0:43.
- GB – Jeff Janis 41-yard pass from Aaron Rodgers (Mason Crosby kick), 0:00. Tied 20–20. Drive: 6 plays, 86 yards, 1:55.

Overtime

- ARI – Larry Fitzgerald 5-yard pass from Carson Palmer, 13:55. Cardinals 26–20. Drive: 3 plays, 80 yards, 1:05.

Green Bay Packers stats

Passing

- Aaron Rodgers – 24/44, 261 yards, 2 touchdowns, 1 interception

Rushing

- Eddie Lacy – 12 rushes, 89 yards
- James Starks – 7 rushes, 23 yards
- Aaron Rodgers – 2 rushes, 21 yards
- John Kuhn – 1 rush, 2 yards

Receiving

- Jeff Janis – 7 receptions, 145 yards, 2 touchdowns
- Jared Abbrederis – 4 receptions, 55 yards
- Richard Rodgers – 4 receptions, 45 yards
- James Starks – 4 receptions, 4 yards
- John Kuhn – 2 receptions, 10 yards
- Eddie Lacy – 2 receptions, 2 yards
Arizona Cardinals stats

Passing

- Carson Palmer – 25/41, 349 yards, 3 touchdowns, 2 interceptions

Rushing

- David Johnson – 15 rushes, 35 yards
- Andre Ellington – 3 rushes, 3 yards
- John Brown – 1 rush, 2 yards

Receiving

- Larry Fitzgerald – 8 receptions, 176 yards, 1 touchdown
- John Brown – 5 receptions, 82 yards
- David Johnson – 6 receptions, 43 yards
- Michael Floyd – 3 receptions, 26 yards, 2 touchdowns
- Darren Fells – 2 receptions, 14 yards
- J. J. Nelson – 1 reception, 8 yards

=== Analysis ===
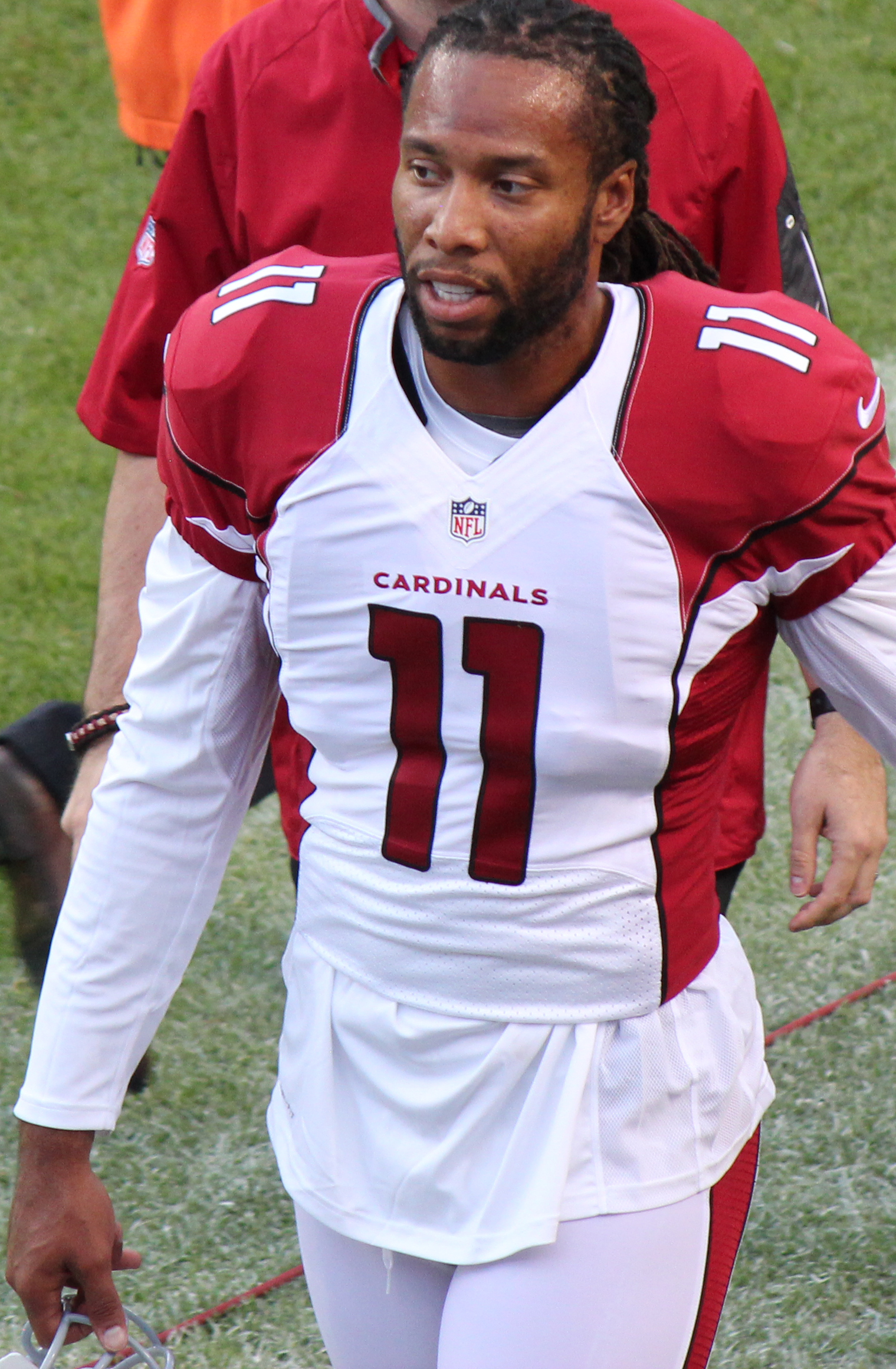
Larry Fitzgerald had the penultimate and final catches to seal the victory for the Cardinals.

Post-game analysis focused primarily on the fourth quarter and overtime. Rodgers' performance on the last drive was lauded, with him throwing for 101 yards on just two passes. Specifically, he was praised for his ability to evade the pass rush on both completions and for the level of difficulty of his final Hail Mary pass. Janis, who at the time was a relatively unknown player in the NFL, had the most productive game of his career by catching seven passes for 145 yards and 2 touchdowns. For his entire career, regular and postseason combined, Janis only recorded 24 catches for 345 yards and 3 touchdowns. Janis was only in the role he was due to injuries to the Packers' primary wide receivers: Davante Adams missed the game due to injury and Randall Cobb got hurt during the game. On the Cardinals side, Fitzgerald's performance was widely praised. Fitzgerald, who only caught one pass for six yards in the first half, ended the game with eight catches for 176 yards and a touchdown. This included his two catches for 80 yards and the game-winning touchdown in overtime, where Fitzgerald avoided a number of Packers' defenders to get to the five yard line.

Two other late game moments were mentioned in post-game analysis: a deflected pass caught for a touchdown and the coin toss. Late in the fourth quarter, the Cardinals had a first down and goal on the nine yard line. Palmer threw a pass towards Fitzgerald, but Damarious Randall deflected the pass. The ball ricocheted directly to Floyd who was standing in the end zone. The score gave the Cardinals a lead late in the game. After tying the game, team captains came out for the coin toss. Rodgers called "tails" and referee Clete Blakeman tossed the coin. However, the coin itself was still inside a protective case and when it was thrown up, it did not flip and landed on "heads". After protests from the Packers players, Blakeman agreed and redid the coin flip. The coin again landed on "heads", this time after flipping. The Cardinals chose to receive the ball to start overtime, leading to their game-winning touchdown.

After the game, head coach Mike McCarthy was criticized for decisions during the season and the game. First, McCarthy faced criticism for not playing Janis more often during the season. Janis was primarily a special teams player for most of his career and saw limited playing time on offense. During the game, McCarthy faced criticism for not going for a two-point conversion twice: first when the Packers scored to go up 12–7; a two-point conversion would have put them up by seven points (a touchdown and extra point). The second time came after the Packers scored their Hail Mary pass. McCarthy went for an extra point to tie the game, instead of going for the victory with a two-point conversion after the Cardinals had suffered a disastrous defensive effort.

== Outcome ==
The Cardinals advanced to the 2015 NFC Championship Game, facing off against the first seed Carolina Panthers. The Cardinals were blown out in that game, 49–15, with Palmer throwing four interceptions. The Packers continued their streak of playoff appearances, extending it to eight straight years in 2016. The Cardinals missed the playoffs in 2016, beginning a five-year playoff drought.

=== Naming ===
The next day, The Arizona Republic ran a full page spread titled "Hail Larry", while the Associated Press also used the term in the headline "'Hail Larry' trumped 'Hail Mary' in Cardinals' victory".

=== Legacy ===
Since their relocation to Arizona in 1988, the Cardinals had only played the Packers in the playoffs once in a 2009 Wild Card game. Similar to this game, that 2009 game ended in a game-winning touchdown in overtime for the Cardinals. The Hail Larry game has been described by multiple commentators as one of the most exciting NFL playoff games in league history, with the NFL ranking the game as the most exciting of the 2015 season.

For the Packers, it marked the third straight year that their season ending in a walk-off score in the playoffs. Rodgers performance on the last drive has been noted for years, specifically his second Hail Mary pass completion of the season. Rodgers continued the trend the next season, completing a third Hail Mary pass in a Wild Card playoff game against the Giants, marking his third such completion in 13 months. For the Cardinals, the game was identified as one of the greatest in franchise history by Sports Illustrated. The NFL, for its 100 year anniversary, identified the game as the 31st greatest game and Fitzgerald's catch-and-run as the 94th greatest play in league history. Rodgers' Hail Mary pass to Janis at the end of the game was also identified as the 48th greatest play in the same rankings. It also marked the only career playoff victory for Palmer and the last for Fitzgerald, who both retired over the next few years.

== See also ==
- List of nicknamed NFL games and plays
