= Joe Duncan (baseball) =

American baseball player

- Catcher

Negro league baseball debut
- 1927, for the Bacharach Giants

Last appearance
- 1927, for the Bacharach Giants

Teams
- Bacharach Giants (1927)

Joseph Duncan was an American Negro league catcher in the 1920s.

Duncan played for the Bacharach Giants in 1927. In 16 recorded games, he posted eight hits in 40 plate appearances.
