= Harvey Randall Wickes Memorial Stadium =

Sporting venue in the United States

Coordinates: 43.510931°N 83.954387°W

- Wickes Stadium
- Interactive map of Harvey Randall Wickes Memorial Stadium
- Location: 7200 Davis Rd Saginaw, MI
- Owner: Saginaw Valley State University
- Operator: Saginaw Valley State University
- Capacity: 6,800
- Surface: Desso Turf

Construction
- Renovated: 2011

Tenant
- Saginaw Valley State (NCAA) (1947–present)

Harvey Randall Wickes Memorial Stadium, known simply as Wickes Stadium, is a 6,800-seat football stadium located in Kochville, Michigan and is a part of the Ryder Center sports complex on the Saginaw Valley State University campus. It is home to the Saginaw Valley State Cardinals football team. The Cardinals compete at the NCAA Division II level as a member of the Great Lakes Intercollegiate Athletic Conference.

Wickes Stadium can also be used for other events, including high school football, graduation ceremonies, and soccer. It is named for Harvey R. Wickes, one of the founders of SVSU.

== Renovation ==
Wickes Stadium underwent a major renovation in the summer of 2011. The university added a brand new lighting system which allowed the Cardinals to play their first night game in the program's history. A new video board was also added alongside a state-of-the-art Desso GrassMaster field surface. Saginaw Valley State is one of only four universities in the NCAA to use this synthetic field turf.
