= Jeff Janis =

American football player (born 1991)

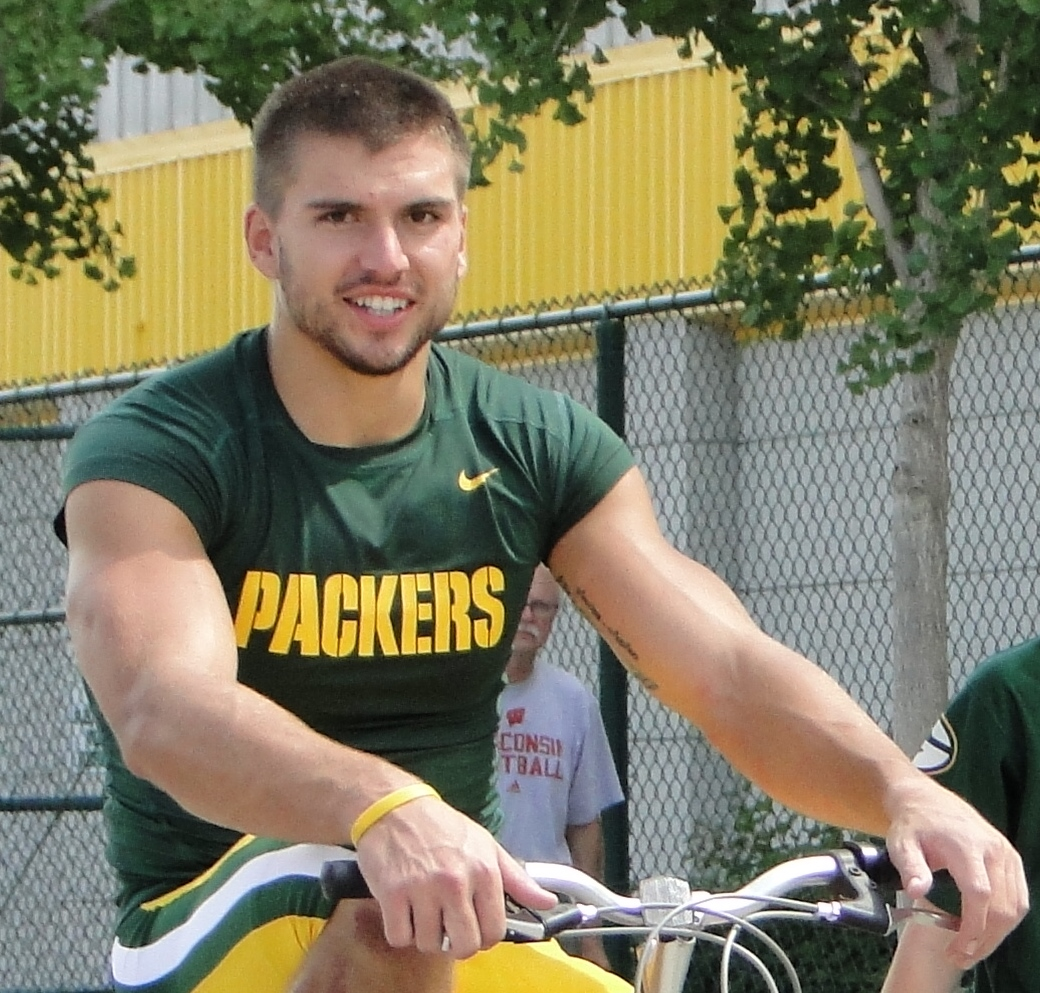
- Janis with the Green Bay Packers in 2014

No. 83
- Position: Wide receiver

Personal information
- Born: June 24, 1991 (age 35); Tawas City, Michigan, U.S.
- Listed height: 6 ft 3 in (1.91 m)
- Listed weight: 219 lb (99 kg)

Career information
- High school: Tawas Area (Tawas City)
- College: Saginaw Valley State (2009–2013)
- NFL draft: 2014: 7th round, 236th overall pick

Career history
- Green Bay Packers (2014–2017); Cleveland Browns (2018)*
- * Offseason or practice squad member only

Career NFL statistics
- Receptions: 17
- Receiving yards: 200
- Return yards: 568
- Total touchdowns: 2
- Stats at Pro Football Reference

Jeffrey Ronald Janis (born June 24, 1991) is an American former professional football player who was a wide receiver in the National Football League (NFL). He played college football for the Saginaw Valley State Cardinals and was selected by the Green Bay Packers in the seventh round of the 2014 NFL draft. Janis was also a member of the Cleveland Browns.

== Early life ==
A native of Tawas City, Michigan, Janis attended Tawas Area High School. He was a member of both the football and basketball teams, and was an all-conference wide receiver who also played as a running back following an injury, and ended up leading his team in rushing.

While most NFL fans in Tawas were Detroit Lions fans, Janis' own father, Christopher, had been a passionate fan of the Green Bay Packers. His father, however, never got to see his son drafted by the team, as he died of liver cancer in August 2010 at the age of 52. Janis' loss of his father came during his sophomore year of college.

== College career ==
Janis attended Saginaw Valley State University from 2009 to 2013, where he played for the Cardinals, an NCAA Division II program. Despite having performed well in a regional high school combine, Janis had received no interest from DI programs and almost no interest from DII programs. A large part of the reason he was overlooked was his lack of size. Graduating high school at seventeen years of age, Janis was among the younger players of his incoming class, and was relatively physically underdeveloped, weighing 180 pounds (82 kg) at 6 ft 2 in (1.88 m). A training regiment during his college career ultimately allowed him to greatly grow his physique by his senior season. By the time he entered the NFL, Janis weighed 219 pounds (99 kg) at 6 ft 3 in (1.91 m).

After redshirting in 2009, Janis caught nine passes for 130 yards. He caught a touchdown in 2010, but hardly received any playing time during that sophomore season. During his junior season in 2011, Janis had a breakout performance, appearing in all 11 games, starting eight and posted a team-high 968 receiving yards on 48 receptions (20.2 avg.) and 14 touchdowns. In 2012, Janis started all 11 games and was second in the nation with 106 receptions and led all DII players with 1,635 receiving yards, both of which set new SVSU single season marks. He caught 17 touchdown passes and was named a first-team All-GLIAC selection. In 2013, Janis caught 83 passes for 1,572 yards and 14 touchdowns, earning first-team All-GLIAC honors and was a first-team AFCA Div. II All-American.

For his collegiate career, Janis finished second in the history of the GLIAC with 4,305 receiving yards.

Janis was invited to play in the 2014 Senior Bowl.

Despite having strong junior and senior seasons, NFL scouts largely overlooked Janis.

=== College statistics ===
Year	Team	GP	Receiving					Rushing					Kick returns				
Year	Team	GP	Rec	Yds	Avg	Lng	TD	Att	Yds	Avg	Lng	TD	Ret	Yds	Avg	Lng	TD
2010	Saginaw Valley State	10	9	130	14.4	28	1	3	16	5.3	15	0	2	40	20.0	20	0
2011	Saginaw Valley State	11	48	968	20.2	76	14	2	17	8.5	14	0	0	0	0.0	0	0
2012	Saginaw Valley State	11	106	1,635	15.4	73	17	1	15	15.0	15	1	0	0	0.0	0	0
2013	Saginaw Valley State	12	83	1,572	18.9	95	14	4	49	12.3	25	2	5	71	14.2	27	0
		44	246	4,305	17.5	95	46	10	97	9.7	25	3	7	111	15.9	27	0

== Professional career ==
Pre-draft measurables
Height	Weight	Arm length	Hand span	40-yard dash	10-yard split	20-yard split	20-yard shuttle	Three-cone drill	Vertical jump	Broad jump	Bench press	Wonderlic
6 ft 2 7/8 in (1.90 m)	219 lb (99 kg)	32 1/2 in (0.83 m)	9 in (0.23 m)	4.42 s	1.55 s	2.60 s	3.98 s	6.64 s	37.5 in (0.95 m)	10 ft 3 in (3.12 m)	20 reps	30
All values are from NFL Combine

=== Green Bay Packers ===
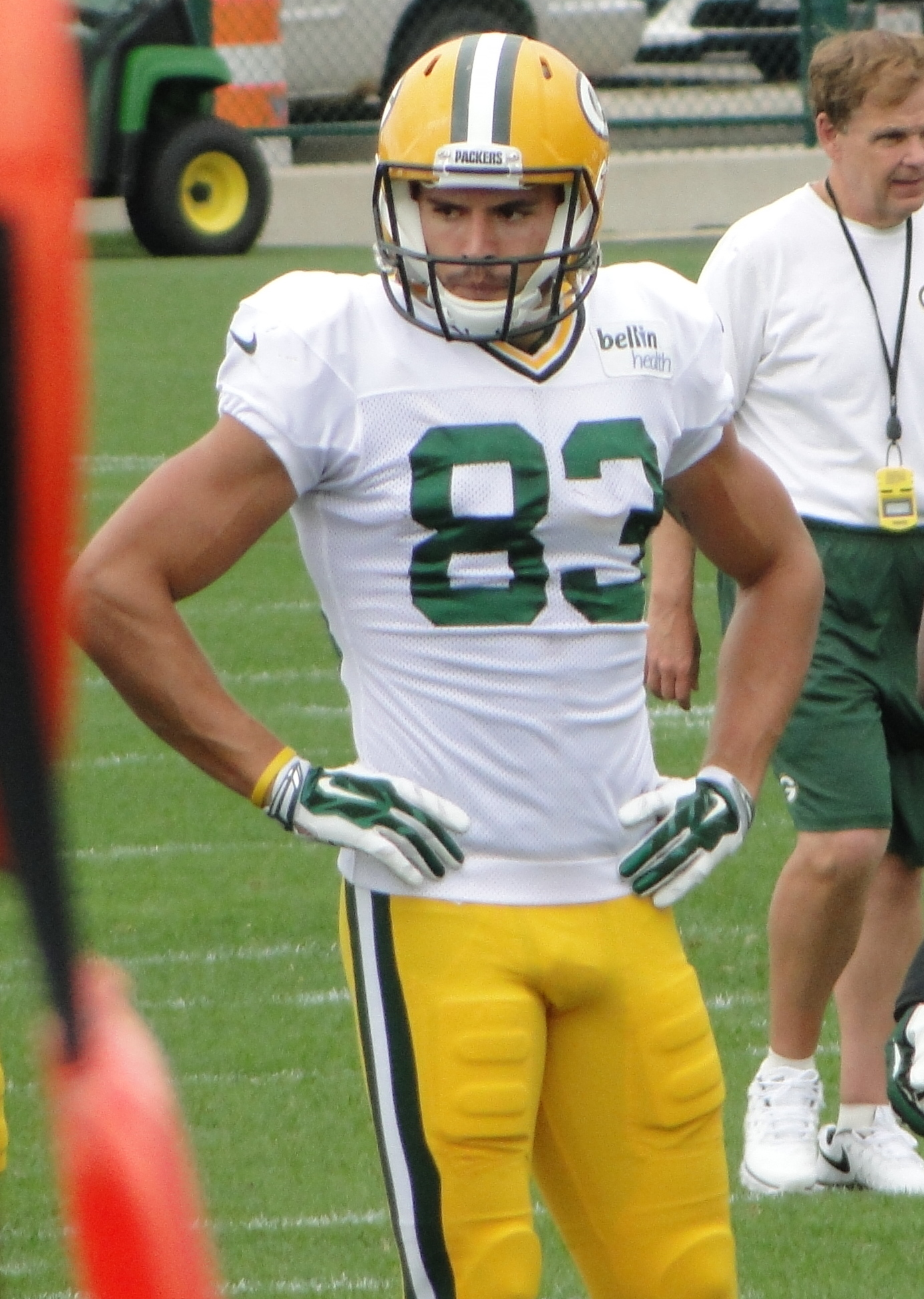
Janis at the Green Bay Packers' 2014 training camp

Janis went relatively overlooked in the 2014 NFL draft, ultimately being selected in the seventh round (236th overall) by the Green Bay Packers. He was the first Saginaw Valley State Cardinal drafted since offensive guard Todd Herremans in 2005, and the first wide receiver in school history to be drafted, though his early role on the team was more on the special teams rather than taking snaps at wide receiver.

During the Packers 2014 training camp, Janis suffered a case of shingles. He was able to participate in much of the camp, and made a number of plays during scrimmages. He played in a pre-season exhibition game for the Packers against the St. Louis Rams in which he made a 34-yard catch and run to score a touchdown.

Janis made his NFL debut on September 28, 2014, against the Chicago Bears, but he recorded no statistics. He appeared in two more games as a rookie, which were against the Minnesota Vikings and Miami Dolphins. Overall, Janis recorded two receptions for 16 yards in his rookie season.

In 2015, Janis appeared in all 16 games in the regular season as a kick returner and backup receiver. His two receptions for 79 yards against the San Diego Chargers were his only receiving statistics for the regular season. Janis had a breakout game in the NFC Divisional Round game on January 16, 2016, against the Arizona Cardinals. He caught seven passes for 145 yards and two touchdowns, including a 41-yard Hail Mary pass from Aaron Rodgers on the final play of regulation to bring the game into overtime, but the Packers lost 26–20. 101 of these yards came on the game-tying drive to end regulation; Janis also caught a 60-yard pass on 4th and 20 from the Packers' four-yard line to set up the tying score.

On August 10, 2016, Janis fractured at least one of the bones in his right hand during a ball-security drill at Packers training camp. He remained in a backup role during the season. Janis had a receiving touchdown against the Atlanta Falcons in the narrow 33–32 loss. Overall, in the 2016 season, he recorded 11 receptions for 93 yards and a touchdown to go along with a 19-yard rushing touchdown, which occurred against the Seattle Seahawks.

In the 2017 season, Janis mainly had a special teams role. He recorded two receptions for 12 yards and three kick returns for 43 net yards.

=== Cleveland Browns ===
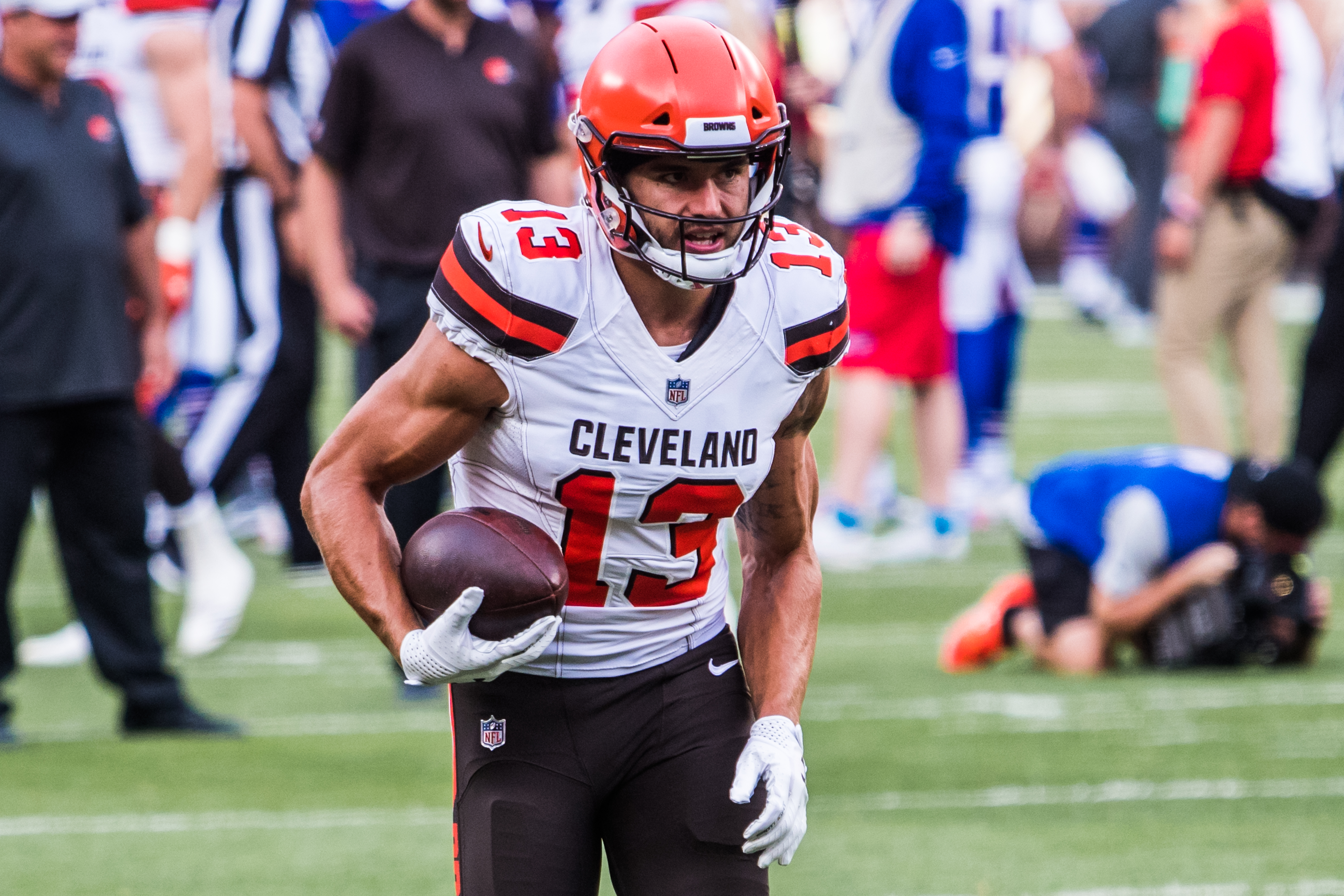
Janis with the Cleveland Browns, in 2018

On March 30, 2018, Janis signed with the Cleveland Browns. He was released on August 31.

=== NFL career statistics ===
==== Regular season ====
Year	Team	GP	GS	Receiving					Kick returns					Fumbles	
Year	Team	GP	GS	Rec	Yds	Avg	Lng	TD	Ret	Yds	Avg	Lng	TD	FUM	Lost
2014	GB	3	0	2	16	8.0	9	0	0	0	0.0	0	0	0	0
2015	GB	16	0	2	79	39.5	46	0	14	406	29.0	70	0	0	0
2016	GB	16	11	11	93	8.5	25	1	6	119	19.8	28	0	0	0
2017	GB	16	0	2	12	6.0	12	0	3	43	14.3	17	0	0	0
Total		51	11	17	200	11.8	46	1	23	568	24.7	70	0	0	0

==== Postseason ====
Year	Team	GP	GS	Receiving					Kick returns					Fumbles	
Year	Team	GP	GS	Rec	Yds	Avg	Lng	TD	Ret	Yds	Avg	Lng	TD	FUM	Lost
2015	GB	2	0	7	145	20.7	60	2	4	99	24.8	35	0	0	0
2016	GB	3	0	0	0	0.0	0	0	3	77	25.7	33	0	0	0
Total		5	0	7	145	20.7	60	2	7	176	25.1	35	0	0	0

== Post-football career ==
In April 2019, Janis bought Timmy Tire Center in East Tawas, Michigan, where he had been employed in high school and college, and renamed it Janis Tire and Auto.

== Personal life ==
Janis and his wife, Alyssa, have four children.

Janis is an avid hunter, having grown fond of both hunting and fishing during his upbringing in Michigan. Janis has partaken in both gun hunting and bowhunting as hobbies, and has expressed being more partial towards bowhunting in his adulthood, describing it as "more challenging". Among the game he is noted to hunt are deer, which he bowhunts. Janis introduced his Packers teammate Brett Hundley both to archery and bowhunting, including taking Hundley out for his first deer hunt on Janis' own Wisconsin property. During his playing career with the Packers, Janis filmed an episode of the Outdoor Channel series Driven with Pat & Nicole that first aired in January 2016. Since retiring from football, Janis has appeared on several hunting-related podcasts.
