= Joe Don Duncan =

American football player (born 1990)

Profile
- Positions: Tight end, fullback

Personal information
- Born: September 17, 1990 (age 36); Corona, California
- Listed height: 6 ft 4 in (1.93 m)
- Listed weight: 267 lb (121 kg)

Career information
- High school: Riverside (CA) Notre Dame
- College: Dixie State
- NFL draft: 2014: undrafted

Career history
- Denver Broncos (2015)*; Brooklyn Bolts (2015)
- * Offseason or practice squad member only

Joe Don Duncan (born September 17, 1990) is an American former football tight end and fullback. He played college football at Dixie State University. He was selected as a first-team player by the American Football Coaches Association on the 2013 Division II All-American team.
