= Saginaw Valley State Cardinals =

Intercollegiate sports teams of Saginaw Valley State University

- University: Saginaw Valley State University
- Conference: GLIAC
- NCAA: Division II
- Athletic director: John Lewandowski
- Location: University Center, Michigan
- Varsity teams: 16
- Football stadium: Harvey Randall Wickes Memorial Stadium
- Basketball arena: James E. O'Neill Jr. Arena
- Ice hockey arena: Saginaw Bay Ice Arena
- Baseball stadium: SVSU Baseball Complex
- Softball stadium: SVSU Softball Complex
- Soccer stadium: Robert C. Braddock Field
- Aquatics center: Gerstacker Regional Aquatic Center
- Lacrosse stadium: Harvey Randall Wickes Memorial Stadium
- Other venues: Cardinal Gymnasium; SVSU Fieldhouse
- Mascot: Coop
- Nickname: Cardinals
- Colors: Red, white, and blue
- Website: www.svsucardinals.com
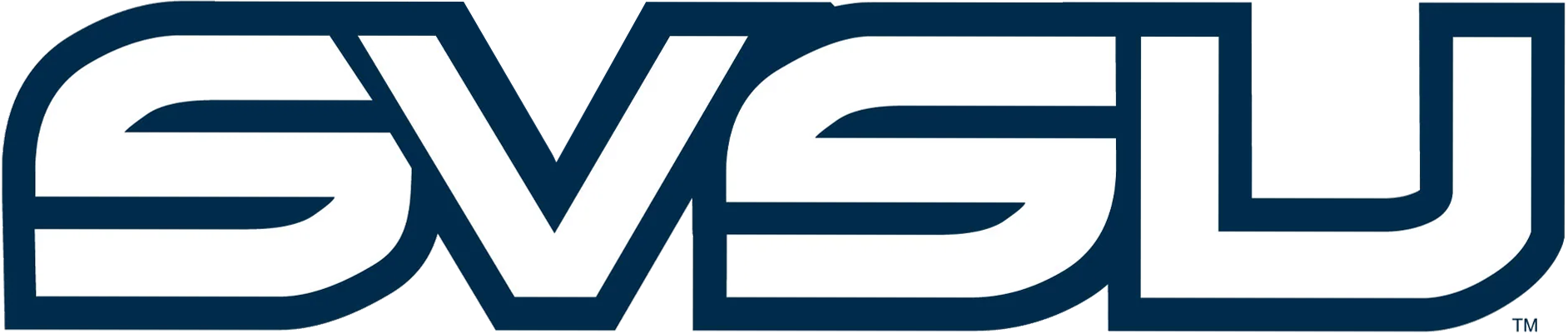

The Saginaw Valley State Cardinals (SVSU Cardinals) are the athletic teams that represent Saginaw Valley State University, located in University Center, Michigan, in NCAA Division II intercollegiate sporting competitions. The Cardinals compete as members of the Great Lakes Intercollegiate Athletic Conference for all 16 varsity sports. The Cardinals have been members of the GLIAC since it was founded in 1972.

== Varsity teams ==
Men's sports (8)	Women's sports (9)
Baseball	Basketball
Basketball	Cross Country
Cross Country	Golf
Football	Soccer
Golf	Softball
Soccer	Swimming and diving
Swimming and diving	Tennis
Track & Field	Track & Field
	Volleyball

== Championships ==
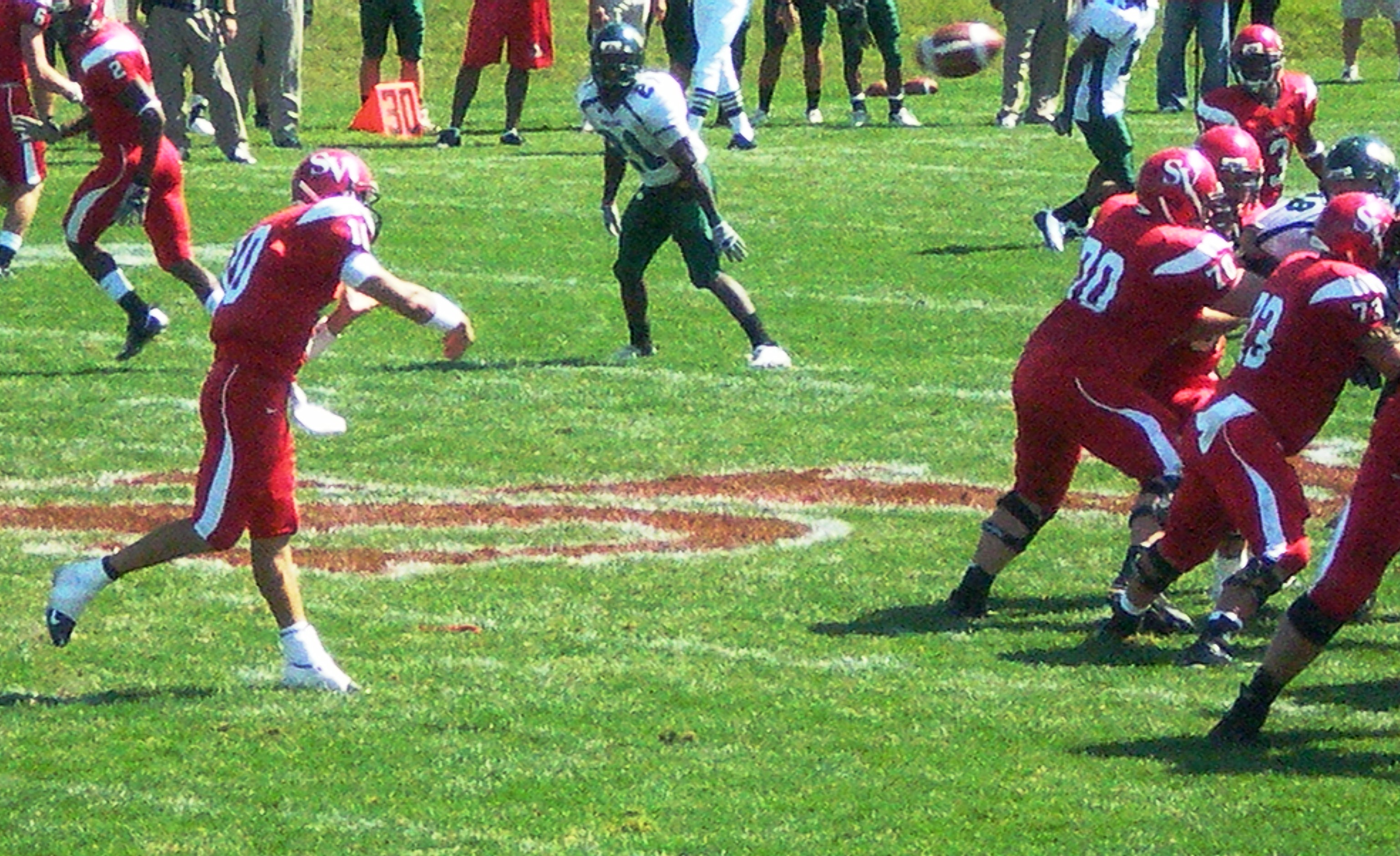
Saginaw Valley State University football game

=== National championships ===
- 1982 – Men's Indoor Track and Field – NAIA
- 1983 – Men's Indoor Track and Field – NAIA
- 1989 – Softball – NAIA
- 1991 – Men's Bowling – USBC Collegiate
- 1997 – Men's Bowling – USBC Collegiate
- 2006 – Men's Bowling – USBC Collegiate
- 2007 – Men's Bowling – USBC Collegiate
- 2009 – Men's Ice Hockey – ACHA Division III
- 2010 – Men's Ice Hockey – ACHA Division III

=== National runners-up ===
- 1977 – Men's Cross Country – NAIA
- 1978 – Men's Cross Country – NAIA
- 1982 – Men's Cross Country – NAIA
- 1983 – Men's Outdoor Track and Field – NAIA
- 1984 – Men's Outdoor Track and Field – NAIA
- 1984 – Men's Golf – NAIA
- 1985 – Women's Basketball – NAIA Division I
- 1996 – Men's Bowling – USBC Collegiate
- 2004 – Men's Bowling – USBC Collegiate
- 2009 – Men's Bowling – USBC Collegiate
- 2012 – Men's Soccer – NCAA Division II

=== Basketball Final Four ===
- 1982 – Women's Basketball – NAIA Division I
- 1985 – Women's Basketball – NAIA Division I (Runner-up)
