= 2022 NFL season =

American football season

Regular season
- Duration: September 8, 2022 – January 8, 2023

Playoffs
- Start date: January 14, 2023
- AFC Champions: Kansas City Chiefs
- NFC Champions: Philadelphia Eagles

Super Bowl LVII
- Date: February 12, 2023
- Site: State Farm Stadium, Glendale, Arizona
- Champions: Kansas City Chiefs

Pro Bowl
- Date: February 5, 2023
- Site: Allegiant Stadium, Paradise, Nevada

AFC teams: West, North, South, East
NFC teams: West, North, South, East

The 2022 NFL season was the 103rd season of the National Football League (NFL). The season began on September 8, 2022, with the defending Super Bowl LVI champion Los Angeles Rams falling to Buffalo in the NFL Kickoff Game, and ended on January 8, 2023. The playoffs started on January 14 and concluded with Super Bowl LVII, the league's championship game, at State Farm Stadium in Glendale, Arizona, on February 12, with Kansas City defeating Philadelphia.

The former Washington Redskins, after two seasons of using the placeholder name Washington Football Team, were renamed the Washington Commanders prior to the start of the season.

The week 17 game between Buffalo and Cincinnati was canceled after Buffalo safety Damar Hamlin suffered a nonfatal cardiac arrest on the field of play. It was the first regular season game to be canceled and not rescheduled since the 1987 NFLPA players' strike.

== Player movement ==
The 2022 NFL league year and trading period began on March 16. On March 14, teams were allowed to exercise options for 2022 on players with option clauses in their contracts, submit qualifying offers to their pending restricted free agents, and submit a Minimum Salary Tender to retain exclusive negotiating rights to their players with expiring 2021 contracts and fewer than three accrued seasons of free agent credit. Teams were required to be under the salary cap using the "top 51" definition (in which the 51 highest paid-players on the team's payroll must have a combined salary cap). On March 16, clubs were allowed to contact and begin contract negotiations with players whose contracts had expired and thus became unrestricted free agents.

This season's salary cap increased to $208.2 million per team, up from both of the previous seasons impacted by the COVID-19 pandemic, $198.2 million in 2020 and $182.5 million in 2021.

Positions key
Offense	Defense	Special teams
QB — Quarterback; RB — Running back; FB — Fullback; WR — Wide receiver; TE — Tight end; OL — Offensive lineman; T — Tackle; G — Guard; C — Center	DL — Defensive lineman; DT — Defensive tackle (Note: Includes nose tackle (NT)); DE — Defensive end; EDGE — Edge rusher; LB — Linebacker (Note: Includes middle linebacker (MLB/MIKE), weakside linebacker (WILL), strongside linebacker (SAM), off-ball linebacker, and outside linebacker (OLB)); DB — Defensive back; CB — Cornerback; S — Safety (Note: Includes free safety (FS) and strong safety (SS))	K — Kicker (Note: Also known as a placekicker (PK)); P — Punter; LS — Long snapper; RS — Return specialist (Note: Includes kickoff and punt returners)

=== Free agency ===
Free agency began on March 16. Notable players to change teams included:

- Quarterbacks Andy Dalton (Chicago to New Orleans), Marcus Mariota (Las Vegas to Atlanta) and Mitchell Trubisky (Buffalo to Pittsburgh)
- Running backs Chase Edmonds (Arizona to Miami), Ronald Jones II (Tampa Bay to Kansas City), Sony Michel (Los Angeles Rams to Miami), and Raheem Mostert (San Francisco to Miami)
- Wide receivers D. J. Chark (Jacksonville to Detroit), Russell Gage (Atlanta to Tampa Bay), Jakeem Grant (Chicago to Cleveland), Julio Jones (Tennessee to Tampa Bay), Zay Jones (Las Vegas to Jacksonville), Christian Kirk (Arizona to Jacksonville), Jarvis Landry (Cleveland to New Orleans), Allen Robinson (Chicago to Los Angeles Rams), JuJu Smith-Schuster (Pittsburgh to Kansas City), and Sammy Watkins (Baltimore to Green Bay)
- Tight ends Evan Engram (New York Giants to Jacksonville), Gerald Everett (Seattle to Los Angeles Chargers), Austin Hooper (Cleveland to Tennessee), O. J. Howard (Tampa Bay to Buffalo), Hayden Hurst (Atlanta to Cincinnati), Kyle Rudolph (New York Giants to Tampa Bay), and C. J. Uzomah (Cincinnati to New York Jets)
- Offensive linemen Terron Armstead (New Orleans to Miami), Duane Brown (Seattle to New York Jets), Alex Cappa (Tampa Bay to Cincinnati), La'el Collins (Dallas to Cincinnati), Austin Corbett (Los Angeles Rams to Carolina), Ted Karras (New England to Cincinnati), Andrew Norwell (Jacksonville to Washington), Rodger Saffold (Tennessee to Buffalo), Brandon Scherff (Washington to Jacksonville), and Laken Tomlinson (San Francisco to New York Jets)
- Defensive linemen Carlos Dunlap (Seattle to Kansas City), Folorunso Fatukasi (New York Jets to Jacksonville), Dante Fowler (Atlanta to Dallas), Akiem Hicks (Chicago to Tampa Bay), Sebastian Joseph-Day (Los Angeles Rams to Los Angeles Chargers), and Jarran Reed (Kansas City to Green Bay)
- Linebackers Randy Gregory (Dallas to Denver), Jordan Hicks (Arizona to Minnesota), Myles Jack (Jacksonville to Pittsburgh), Chandler Jones (Arizona to Las Vegas), Cory Littleton (Las Vegas to Carolina), Haason Reddick (Carolina to Philadelphia), Von Miller (Los Angeles Rams to Buffalo), Foyesade Oluokun (Atlanta to Jacksonville), Za'Darius Smith (Green Bay to Minnesota), and Bobby Wagner (Seattle to Los Angeles Rams)
- Defensive backs James Bradberry (New York Giants to Philadelphia), Stephon Gilmore (Carolina to Indianapolis), Casey Hayward (Las Vegas to Atlanta), J. C. Jackson (New England to Los Angeles Chargers), Tyrann Mathieu (Kansas City to New Orleans), Marcus Maye (New York Jets to New Orleans), Rodney McLeod (Philadelphia to Indianapolis), D. J. Reed (Seattle to New York Jets), Justin Reid (Houston to Kansas City), Logan Ryan (New York Giants to Tampa Bay), Charvarius Ward (Kansas City to San Francisco), Jordan Whitehead (Tampa Bay to New York Jets), Darious Williams (Los Angeles Rams to Jacksonville), Marcus Williams (New Orleans to Baltimore), and Xavier Woods (Minnesota to Carolina)
- Kicker Greg Zuerlein (Dallas to New York Jets)
- Punters Johnny Hekker (Los Angeles Rams to Carolina), Thomas Morstead (Atlanta to Miami), and Bradley Pinion (Tampa Bay to Atlanta)

=== Trades ===
The following notable trades were made during the 2022 league year:

- March 16: Seattle traded QB Russell Wilson and a 2022 fourth round selection to Denver in exchange for QB Drew Lock, TE Noah Fant, and DE Shelby Harris along with 2022 first (No .9), second, and fifth round selections, and 2023 first and second round selections.
- March 16: Indianapolis traded QB Carson Wentz and a 2022 second round selection to Washington in exchange for a 2022 second round selection and a 2023 conditional third round selection.
- March 16: Chicago traded LB Khalil Mack to the Los Angeles Chargers in exchange for 2022 second and sixth round selections.
- March 16: Las Vegas traded DE Yannick Ngakoue to Indianapolis in exchange for CB Rock Ya-Sin.
- March 16: Dallas traded WR Amari Cooper and a 2022 sixth round selection to Cleveland in exchange for 2022 fifth and sixth round selections.
- March 16: New England traded LB Chase Winovich to Cleveland in exchange for LB Mack Wilson.
- March 17: Green Bay traded WR Davante Adams to Las Vegas in exchange for 2022 first and second round selections.
- March 18: Houston traded QB Deshaun Watson and a 2024 sixth round selection to Cleveland in exchange for 2022 first and fourth round selections, 2023 first and third round selections, and 2024 first and fourth round selections.
- March 21: Atlanta traded QB Matt Ryan to Indianapolis in exchange for a 2022 third round selection.
- March 23: Kansas City traded WR Tyreek Hill to Miami in exchange for 2022 first, second, and fourth round selections along with 2023 fourth and sixth round selections.
- April 5: Miami traded WR DeVante Parker and a 2022 fifth round selection to New England in exchange for a 2023 third round selection.
- April 28: Tennessee traded WR A. J. Brown to Philadelphia in exchange for 2022 first and third round selections.
- April 28: Baltimore traded WR Marquise Brown and a 2022 third round selection to Arizona in exchange for a 2022 first round selection.
- August 15: Philadelphia traded TE J. J. Arcega-Whiteside to Seattle in exchange for FS Ugo Amadi.
- October 9: Atlanta traded LB Deion Jones and a 2024 seventh round selection to Cleveland in exchange for a 2024 sixth round selection.
- October 20: Carolina traded RB Christian McCaffrey to San Francisco in exchange for 2023 second, third, and fourth round selections, and a 2024 fifth round selection.
- October 26: Chicago traded DE Robert Quinn to Philadelphia in exchange for a 2023 fourth round selection.
- October 27: The New York Giants traded WR Kadarius Toney to Kansas City in exchange for 2023 third and sixth round selections.
- October 31: Chicago traded LB Roquan Smith to Baltimore in exchange for LB A. J. Klein along with 2023 second and fifth round selections.
- November 1: Detroit traded TE T. J. Hockenson a 2023 4th round and a conditional 2024 4th round to Minnesota in exchange for a 2023 second-round selection and a 2024 third-round selection.
- November 1: Pittsburgh traded WR Chase Claypool to Chicago in exchange for a 2023 second-round selection.
- November 1: Denver traded LB Bradley Chubb along with a 2025 fifth-round selection to Miami for RB Chase Edmonds, a 2023 first-round selection, and 2024 fourth-round selection.
- November 1: Buffalo traded RB Zack Moss and a conditional 2023 sixth-round pick to Indianapolis for RB Nyheim Hines.

=== Retirements ===
Notable retirements

- WR Larry Fitzgerald - Eleven-time Pro Bowler, three-time All-Pro (one first-team, two-second team), and 2016 Walter Payton Man of the Year. Played for Arizona during his entire 17-year career.
- RB Frank Gore – Five-time Pro Bowler and one-time second-team All-Pro. Played for San Francisco, Indianapolis, Miami, Buffalo, and the New York Jets during his 16-year career.
- K Stephen Gostkowski – Four-time Pro Bowler, three-time All-Pro (two first-team, one second-team), and three-time Super Bowl champion (XLIX, LI, LIII). Played for New England and Tennessee during his 15-year career.
- TE Rob Gronkowski – Five-time Pro Bowler, four-time first-team All-Pro, four-time Super Bowl champion (XLIX, LI, LIII, and LV), and 2014 Comeback Player of the Year. Played for New England and Tampa Bay during his 11-year career.
- RB Todd Gurley – Three-time Pro Bowler, three-time All-Pro (two first-team, one second-team), 2015 Offensive Rookie of the Year, and 2017 Offensive Player of the Year. Played for the St. Louis/Los Angeles Rams and Atlanta during his six-year career.
- G Richie Incognito – Four-time Pro Bowler. Played for the St. Louis Rams, Buffalo, Miami, and the Oakland/Las Vegas Raiders during his 15-year career.
- SS Malcolm Jenkins – Three-time Pro Bowler, one-time second-team All-Pro, and two-time Super Bowl champion (XLIV and LII). Played for New Orleans and Philadelphia during his 13-year career.
- LB Ryan Kerrigan – Four-time Pro Bowler. Played for Washington and Philadelphia during his 11-year career.
- C Alex Mack – Seven-time Pro Bowler and three-time second-team All-Pro. Played for Cleveland, Atlanta, and San Francisco during his 13-year career.
- LB Clay Matthews III – Six-time Pro Bowler, two-time All-Pro (one first-team, one second-team), and Super Bowl XLV champion. Played for Green Bay and the Los Angeles Rams during his 11-year career.
- QB Ben Roethlisberger – Six-time Pro Bowler, two-time Super Bowl champion (XL and XLIII), and 2004 Offensive Rookie of the Year. Played for Pittsburgh during his entire 18-year career.
- OT Mitchell Schwartz – Four-time All-Pro (one first-team, three second-team) and Super Bowl LIV champion. Played for Cleveland and Kansas City during his nine-year career.
- CB Richard Sherman - Five-time Pro Bowler, five-time All-Pro (three first-team, two second-team), and Super Bowl XLVIII champion. Played for Seattle, San Francisco, and Tampa Bay during his 10-year career.
- LB Terrell Suggs - Seven-time Pro Bowler, two-time All-Pro (one first team, one second team), two-time Super Bowl champion (XLVII and LIV), 2003 Defensive Rookie of the Year, and 2011 Defensive Player of the Year. Played for Baltimore, Arizona, and Kansas City during his 19-year career.
- FS Eric Weddle – Six-time Pro Bowler, five-time All-Pro (two first-team, three second-team), and Super Bowl LVI champion. Played for the San Diego Chargers, Baltimore, and the Los Angeles Rams during his 14-year career.
- OT Andrew Whitworth – Four-time Pro Bowler, three-time All-Pro (two first-team, one second-team), 2021 Walter Payton Man of the Year, and Super Bowl LVI champion. Played for Cincinnati and the Los Angeles Rams during his 16-year career.

Other retirements

- Jay Ajayi
- Beau Allen
- Ricardo Allen
- Kiko Alonso
- Danny Amendola
- Blake Bortles
- Brandon Brooks
- Chris Carson
- Jack Cichy
- Cameron Clark
- Ha Ha Clinton-Dix
- Jack Crawford
- Gehrig Dieter
- Jack Doyle
- Andrew East
- B. J. Finney
- Kylie Fitts
- Ryan Fitzpatrick
- Kavon Frazier
- Antonio Gandy-Golden
- Eddie Goldman
- Denzelle Good
- B. J. Goodson
- Shaquem Griffin
- Joe Haden
- Devlin Hodges
- Chris Hogan
- Wyatt Hubert
- Sam Koch
- Matt LaCosse
- Anthony Levine
- Brandon Linder
- Corey Liuget
- Cameron Malveaux
- Ali Marpet
- Jason McCourty
- Rashaan Melvin
- Whitney Mercilus
- John Penisini
- Malcolm Perry
- Bilal Powell
- Ty Sambrailo
- Emmanuel Sanders
- Buster Skrine
- Jimmy Smith
- Lee Smith
- J. R. Sweezy
- Ryan Switzer
- JC Tretter
- Stephon Tuitt
- Alejandro Villanueva
- Delanie Walker
- Trae Waynes
- James White
- Tahir Whitehead
- Khari Willis
- Robert Windsor
- Derek Wolfe
- K. J. Wright

=== Draft ===
The 2022 NFL draft was held in Las Vegas, Nevada, from April 28–30. Jacksonville, by virtue of having the worst record in 2021, held the first overall selection and selected linebacker Travon Walker out of Georgia.

== Officiating changes ==
Among the officiating changes in 2022, referee Tony Corrente retired after 27 seasons in the NFL. Umpire Tra Blake was promoted to replace Corrente. Blake had been a referee in the Alliance of American Football in 2019 and in the 2020 version of the XFL before joining the NFL later in 2020. Blake's promotion gave the NFL four African-American referees in a single season for the first time; Blake joined Ron Torbert, Shawn Smith and Adrian Hill as crew chiefs.

Side Judge Lo van Pham was hired from the Big 12 Conference, becoming the league's first Asian-American NFL official.

Down Judge Robin DeLorenzo became the third female NFL official, joining Sarah Thomas and Maia Chaka.

== Rule changes ==
The NFL Diversity, Equity, and Inclusion Committee announced the following policy changes on March 28:

- All teams are required to have a woman or minority offensive assistant on staff for the 2022 season.
- The Rooney Rule has been expanded to include women, regardless of their racial or ethnic background.

The following rule changes were approved at the NFL Owner's Meeting on March 28:

- In the postseason only, both teams are assured of one possession in overtime, even if the first team with possession scores a touchdown. This change was made in response to several recent playoff games in which the first team to possess the ball in overtime scored a touchdown and the other team did not have a chance to respond.
- Made permanent a 2021 experimental rule change to limit the receiving team on kickoffs to no more than nine players in the "set-up zone" (the area between 10 and 25 yards from the kickoff spot).

The following changes to roster management were made on May 25:

- Players on injured reserve (IR) are eligible to return to the roster after missing four games. This is up from the temporary three-game requirement in place during 2020 and 2021 to account for the impact of COVID-19 on rosters, but down from the eight games required prior to 2020.
- Teams can allow up to eight players to return from IR to the active roster per season. This limit was previously two players prior to 2020, but the limit was temporarily removed for 2020 and 2021. A player may return from injured reserve multiple times in a single season, but each return counts against the team's allotment of eight.
- Practice squads will remain at 16 players. The temporary increase from 12 to 16 players originally introduced in 2020 was made permanent.
- Teams may continue to elevate up to two players from the practice squad to the game-day roster for each game. A practice squad player may be elevated up to three times per season before the team is required to sign him to the active roster (up from the previous limit of two games).

The following change to the concussion protocol was made on October 8, following Tua Tagovailoa's injury in week 3:

- added the diagnosis of ataxia to the mandatory "no-go" symptoms that determine whether or not a player re-enters a game.

The following enhancements and updates to diversity, equity and inclusion efforts was announced at the NFL Fall League Meeting on October 18:

- Key decision makers in a head coach or general manager search, including owners, are required to participate in inclusive hiring training prior to the head coach or general manager search.

== 2022 deaths ==
=== Pro Football Hall of Fame members ===
Len Dawson
Dawson played 19 seasons in the NFL and AFL as a quarterback with the Pittsburgh Steelers, Cleveland Browns, and Dallas Texans / Kansas City Chiefs, and was inducted into the Hall of Fame in 1987. He was a one-time Pro Bowler and six-time AFL All-Star, four-time All-AFL (two first-team, two second-team), three-time AFL champion (1962, 1966, and 1969), and Super Bowl IV champion and MVP. He died on August 24, age 87.

Ray Guy
Guy played 14 seasons in the NFL as a punter with the Oakland/Los Angeles Raiders, and was inducted into the Hall of Fame in 2014. He was a seven-time Pro Bowler, eight-time All-Pro (six first-team, two second-team), and three-time Super Bowl champion (XI, XV, and XVIII). He died on November 3, age 72.

Franco Harris
Harris played 13 seasons in the NFL as a running back with the Pittsburgh Steelers and Seattle Seahawks, and was inducted into the Hall of Fame in 1990. He was a nine-time Pro Bowler, three-time All-Pro (one first-team, two second-team), four-time Super Bowl champion (IX, X, XIII, and XIV), and Super Bowl IX MVP. Receiver of the Immaculate Reception. Harris died on December 20, age 72.

Don Maynard
Maynard played 15 seasons in the NFL and AFL as a wide receiver with the New York Giants, the New York Jets, and the St. Louis Cardinals, and was inducted into the Hall of Fame in 1987. He was a four-time Pro Bowler, four-time All-Pro (two first-team, two second-team), and Super Bowl III champion. He died on January 10, age 86.

Hugh McElhenny
McElhenny played 13 seasons in the NFL as a halfback with the San Francisco 49ers, the Minnesota Vikings, the New York Giants, and the Detroit Lions, and was inducted into the Hall of Fame in 1970. He was a six-time Pro Bowler and five-time first-team All-Pro. He died on June 17, age 93.

Charley Taylor
Taylor played 14 seasons in the NFL as a wide receiver/halfback with the Washington Redskins, and was inducted into the Hall of Fame in 1984. He was an eight-time Pro Bowler and six-time All-Pro (one first-team, five second-team). He died on February 19, age 80.

Charley Trippi
Trippi played nine seasons in the NFL as a halfback/quarterback with the Chicago Cardinals, and was inducted into the Hall of Fame in 1968. He was a two-time Pro Bowler, two-time All-Pro (one first-team, one second-team) and 1947 NFL Champion. He died on October 19, age 100.

Rayfield Wright
Wright played 13 seasons in the NFL as an offensive tackle with the Dallas Cowboys, and was inducted into the Hall of Fame in 2006. He was a six-time Pro Bowler, six-time All-Pro (three first-team, three second-team), and two-time Super Bowl champion (VI and XII). He died on April 7, age 76.

=== Active personnel ===
- Jaylon Ferguson, Baltimore Ravens linebacker. Died June 21 of an accidental drug overdose, age 26.
- Jeff Gladney, Arizona Cardinals cornerback. Died in a car accident on May 30, age 25.
- Dwayne Haskins, Pittsburgh Steelers quarterback. Died on April 9, after being hit by a truck while walking on highway, age 24.
- Adam Zimmer, offensive analyst for the Cincinnati Bengals. Died on October 31, of chronic ethanol (alcohol) use disorder, age 38.

== Preseason ==
The majority of training camps began on July 27. The preseason began on August 4 with the Pro Football Hall of Fame Game, in which Las Vegas (represented in the Hall of Fame Class of 2022 by Richard Seymour and Cliff Branch) defeated Jacksonville (represented by Tony Boselli).

In March, the league passed a resolution to require the use of "Guardian Caps", oversized outer layers of padding placed on the helmet, from the start of training camp through the second preseason game for offensive linemen, defensive linemen, linebackers, and tight ends. A guardian cap is a soft-shell padding aimed to decrease forces sustained during head-to-head contact and limit head injuries that may come with such contact.

== Regular season ==
The NFL released the 2022 regular season schedule on May 12, with select games announced in advance of the full schedule release.

The season is planned to be played over an 18-week schedule beginning on September 8. Each of the league's 32 teams plays 17 games, with one bye week for each team. The regular season ended on January 8, 2023; all games during the final weekend will be intra-division games, as it has been since 2010.

Each team plays the other three teams in its own division twice, one game against each of the four teams from a division in its own conference, one game against each of the four teams from a division in the other conference, one game against each of the remaining two teams in its conference that finished in the same position in their respective divisions the previous season (e.g., the team that finished fourth in its division would play all three other teams in its conference that also finished fourth in their divisions), and one game against a team in another division in the other conference that also finished in the same position in their respective division the previous season.

The division pairings for 2022 are as follows:

Four intra-conference games
AFC East vs AFC North
AFC South vs AFC West
NFC East vs NFC North
NFC South vs NFC West

Four interconference games
AFC East vs NFC North
AFC North vs NFC South
AFC South vs NFC East
AFC West vs NFC West

Interconference game by 2021 position
AFC North at NFC East
AFC South at NFC North
AFC West at NFC South
AFC East at NFC West

Highlights of the 2022 season include:

- NFL Kickoff Game: The 2022 season began with the Kickoff Game on September 8, with Buffalo defeating the defending Super Bowl LVI champion Los Angeles Rams.
- NFL International Series: There were three games in London in 2022: Minnesota at New Orleans on October 2 and the New York Giants at Green Bay on October 9 at Tottenham Hotspur Stadium, and Denver at Jacksonville on October 30 at Wembley Stadium. The league also staged a game in Germany for the first time: Seattle at Tampa Bay at Munich's Allianz Arena on November 13. All four games were scheduled for 9:30 a.m. ET starts. The International Series also returned to Mexico on November 21, in which San Francisco faced Arizona at Estadio Azteca in Mexico City on Monday Night Football. Minnesota, New York, Denver, Tampa Bay and San Francisco won the games.
- Thanksgiving: As has been the case since 2006, three games were played on Thursday, November 24, with Buffalo at Detroit and the New York Giants at Dallas in the traditional afternoon doubleheader, and New England at Minnesota in the nightcap. Buffalo, Dallas, and Minnesota won the games.
- Christmas: Christmas Day, December 25, fell on a Sunday. When this occurs, the normal Sunday afternoon games are instead played on Saturday, Christmas Eve, while Sunday Night Football and other special national games are scheduled for Christmas Day. For 2022, the league played three games on Christmas Day for the first time, consisting of an afternoon doubleheader featuring Green Bay at Miami and Denver at the Los Angeles Rams, and the Sunday Night Football game featuring Tampa Bay at Arizona. The league also scheduled a Christmas Eve primetime game on NFL Network with Las Vegas at Pittsburgh, Green Bay, Los Angeles, Tampa Bay, and Pittsburgh won the games.

=== Scheduling changes ===
Week 11:

- The Kansas City–Los Angeles Chargers game, originally scheduled for 4:25 p.m. ET on CBS, was flexed into NBC Sunday Night Football at 8:20 p.m. ET, replacing the originally scheduled Cincinnati–Pittsburgh game, which was moved to 4:25 p.m. ET on CBS.
- The Cleveland–Buffalo game was moved from Highmark Stadium near Buffalo to Ford Field in Detroit due to a severe winter storm affecting the Buffalo region.

Week 14:

- The Miami–Los Angeles Chargers game, originally scheduled for 4:05 p.m. ET on CBS, was flexed into NBC Sunday Night Football at 8:20 p.m. ET, replacing the originally scheduled Kansas City–Denver game, which was moved to 4:05 p.m. ET on CBS.

Week 15:

- On December 5, the NFL announced that three games would be moved to Saturday, December 17, and aired exclusively on NFL Network: Indianapolis–Minnesota at 1:00 p.m. ET, Baltimore–Cleveland at 4:30 p.m. ET, and Miami–Buffalo at 8:15 p.m. ET.
- One of the other games that the league had the option of scheduling on Saturday, New York Giants–Washington, was flexed into NBC Sunday Night Football at 8:20 p.m. ET, replacing the originally scheduled New England–Las Vegas game, which was moved to 4:05 p.m. ET on Fox.
- The remaining game that the league had the option of scheduling on Saturday, Atlanta–New Orleans, remained on Sunday afternoon, December 18.
- The Detroit–New York Jets game was cross-flexed from Fox to CBS, remaining at 1:00 p.m. ET.

Week 17:

- The Pittsburgh–Baltimore game, originally scheduled for 1:00 p.m. ET on CBS, was flexed into NBC Sunday Night Football at 8:20 p.m. ET, replacing the originally scheduled Los Angeles Rams–Los Angeles Chargers game, which was moved to 4:25 p.m. ET on CBS.
- The Buffalo–Cincinnati Monday Night Football game was suspended indefinitely with 5:58 remaining in the first quarter after Bills safety Damar Hamlin suffered cardiac arrest after tackling Bengals wide receiver Tee Higgins and was taken to the hospital for treatment. It was later announced that the game would be canceled in its entirety.

Week 18:

- All Week 18 games were initially listed with a kickoff time of "TBD" and the schedule was released on January 2 after the Sunday games of Week 17 was completed.

- Two games with playoff implications were moved to a Saturday doubleheader on ESPN and ABC: Kansas City–Las Vegas at 4:30 pm ET and Tennessee–Jacksonville (which decided the AFC South champion) at 8:15 pm ET.
- The Detroit–Green Bay game was moved to the final Sunday Night Football game at 8:20 pm ET on NBC.
- All remaining games were scheduled on Sunday afternoon at either 1:00 or 4:25 pm ET on either CBS or Fox.

== Regular season standings ==
=== Division ===
AFC East
	W	L	T	PCT	DIV	CONF	PF	PA	STK
^{(2)} Buffalo Bills	13	3	0	.813	4–2	9–2	455	286	W7
^{(7)} Miami Dolphins	9	8	0	.529	3–3	7–5	397	399	W1
New England Patriots	8	9	0	.471	3–3	6–6	364	347	L1
New York Jets	7	10	0	.412	2–4	5–7	296	316	L6

AFC North
	W	L	T	PCT	DIV	CONF	PF	PA	STK
^{(3)} Cincinnati Bengals	12	4	0	.750	3–3	8–3	418	322	W8
^{(6)} Baltimore Ravens	10	7	0	.588	3–3	6–6	350	315	L2
Pittsburgh Steelers	9	8	0	.529	3–3	5–7	308	346	W4
Cleveland Browns	7	10	0	.412	3–3	4–8	361	381	L1

AFC South
	W	L	T	PCT	DIV	CONF	PF	PA	STK
^{(4)} Jacksonville Jaguars	9	8	0	.529	4–2	8–4	404	350	W5
Tennessee Titans	7	10	0	.412	3–3	5–7	298	359	L7
Indianapolis Colts	4	12	1	.265	1–4–1	4–7–1	289	427	L7
Houston Texans	3	13	1	.206	3–2–1	3–8–1	289	420	W1

AFC West
	W	L	T	PCT	DIV	CONF	PF	PA	STK
^{(1)} Kansas City Chiefs	14	3	0	.824	6–0	9–3	496	369	W5
^{(5)} Los Angeles Chargers	10	7	0	.588	2–4	7–5	391	384	L1
Las Vegas Raiders	6	11	0	.353	3–3	5–7	395	418	L3
Denver Broncos	5	12	0	.294	1–5	3–9	287	359	W1

NFC East
	W	L	T	PCT	DIV	CONF	PF	PA	STK
^{(1)} Philadelphia Eagles	14	3	0	.824	4–2	9–3	477	344	W1
^{(5)} Dallas Cowboys	12	5	0	.706	4–2	8–4	467	342	L1
^{(6)} New York Giants	9	7	1	.559	1–4–1	4–7–1	365	371	L1
Washington Commanders	8	8	1	.500	2–3–1	5–6–1	321	343	W1

NFC North
	W	L	T	PCT	DIV	CONF	PF	PA	STK
^{(3)} Minnesota Vikings	13	4	0	.765	4–2	8–4	424	427	W1
Detroit Lions	9	8	0	.529	5–1	7–5	453	427	W2
Green Bay Packers	8	9	0	.471	3–3	6–6	370	371	L1
Chicago Bears	3	14	0	.176	0–6	1–11	326	463	L10

NFC South
	W	L	T	PCT	DIV	CONF	PF	PA	STK
^{(4)} Tampa Bay Buccaneers	8	9	0	.471	4–2	8–4	313	358	L1
Carolina Panthers	7	10	0	.412	4–2	6–6	347	374	W1
New Orleans Saints	7	10	0	.412	2–4	5–7	330	345	L1
Atlanta Falcons	7	10	0	.412	2–4	6–6	365	386	W2

NFC West
	W	L	T	PCT	DIV	CONF	PF	PA	STK
^{(2)} San Francisco 49ers	13	4	0	.765	6–0	10–2	450	277	W10
^{(7)} Seattle Seahawks	9	8	0	.529	4–2	6–6	407	401	W2
Los Angeles Rams	5	12	0	.294	1–5	3–9	307	384	L2
Arizona Cardinals	4	13	0	.235	1–5	3–9	340	449	L7

=== Conference ===
AFC
#	Team	Division	W	L	T	PCT	DIV	CONF	SOS	SOV	STK
Division leaders
1	Kansas City Chiefs	West	14	3	0	.824	6–0	9–3	.453	.422	W5
2	Buffalo Bills	East	13	3	0	.813	4–2	9–2	.489	.471	W7
3	Cincinnati Bengals	North	12	4	0	.750	3–3	8–3	.507	.490	W8
4	Jacksonville Jaguars	South	9	8	0	.529	4–2	8–4	.467	.438	W5
Wild cards
5 (Note: LA Chargers claimed the No. 5 seed over Baltimore based on conference record (7–5 vs. 6–6).)	Los Angeles Chargers	West	10	7	0	.588	2–4	7–5	.443	.341	L1
6	Baltimore Ravens	North	10	7	0	.588	3–3	6–6	.509	.456	L2
7 (Note: Miami finished ahead of Pittsburgh based on head-to-head victory, claiming the 7th and final playoff spot.)	Miami Dolphins	East	9	8	0	.529	3–3	7–5	.537	.457	W1
Did not qualify for the postseason
8	Pittsburgh Steelers	North	9	8	0	.529	3–3	5–7	.519	.451	W4
9	New England Patriots	East	8	9	0	.471	3–3	6–6	.502	.415	L1
10 (Note: NY Jets and Tennessee finished ahead of Cleveland based on conference record (5–7 vs. 4–8).) (Note: NY Jets finished ahead of Tennessee based on common record (3–3 vs. 2–4 against: Buffalo, Cincinnati, Denver, Green Bay, Jacksonville).)	New York Jets	East	7	10	0	.412	2–4	5–7	.538	.458	L6
11	Tennessee Titans	South	7	10	0	.412	3–3	5–7	.509	.336	L7
12	Cleveland Browns	North	7	10	0	.412	3–3	4–8	.524	.492	L1
13	Las Vegas Raiders	West	6	11	0	.353	3–3	5–7	.474	.397	L3
14	Denver Broncos	West	5	12	0	.294	1–5	3–9	.481	.465	W1
15	Indianapolis Colts	South	4	12	1	.265	1–4–1	4–7–1	.512	.500	L7
16	Houston Texans	South	3	13	1	.206	3–2–1	3–8–1	.481	.402	W1
Tiebreakers (Note: When breaking ties for three or more teams under the NFL's rules, they are first broken within divisions, then comparing only the highest ranked remaining team from each division.)

NFC
#	Team	Division	W	L	T	PCT	DIV	CONF	SOS	SOV	STK
Division leaders
1	Philadelphia Eagles	East	14	3	0	.824	4–2	9–3	.474	.460	W1
2 (Note: San Francisco claimed the No. 2 seed over Minnesota based on conference record (10–2 vs. 8–4).)	San Francisco 49ers	West	13	4	0	.765	6–0	10–2	.417	.414	W10
3	Minnesota Vikings	North	13	4	0	.765	4–2	8–4	.474	.425	W1
4	Tampa Bay Buccaneers	South	8	9	0	.471	4–2	8–4	.503	.426	L1
Wild cards
5	Dallas Cowboys	East	12	5	0	.706	4–2	8–4	.507	.485	L1
6	New York Giants	East	9	7	1	.559	1–4–1	4–7–1	.526	.395	L1
7 (Note: Seattle finished ahead of Detroit based on head-to-head victory, claiming the 7th and final playoff spot.)	Seattle Seahawks	West	9	8	0	.529	4–2	6–6	.462	.382	W2
Did not qualify for the postseason
8	Detroit Lions	North	9	8	0	.529	5–1	7–5	.535	.451	W2
9	Washington Commanders	East	8	8	1	.500	2–3–1	5–6–1	.536	.449	W1
10	Green Bay Packers	North	8	9	0	.471	3–3	6–6	.524	.449	L1
11 (Note: Carolina finished ahead of New Orleans and Atlanta based on head-to-head record (3–1 vs. 2–2/1–3).)	Carolina Panthers	South	7	10	0	.412	4–2	6–6	.474	.437	W1
12 (Note: New Orleans finished ahead of Atlanta based on head-to-head sweep.)	New Orleans Saints	South	7	10	0	.412	2–4	5–7	.507	.462	L1
13	Atlanta Falcons	South	7	10	0	.412	2–4	6–6	.467	.429	W2
14	Los Angeles Rams	West	5	12	0	.294	1–5	3–9	.517	.341	L2
15	Arizona Cardinals	West	4	13	0	.235	1–5	3–9	.529	.368	L7
16	Chicago Bears	North	3	14	0	.176	0–6	1–11	.571	.480	L10
Tiebreakers (Note: When breaking ties for three or more teams under the NFL's rules, they are first broken within divisions, then comparing only the highest-ranked remaining team from each division.)

== Postseason ==
The 2022 playoffs began with the wild-card round, with three wild-card games played in each conference. Wild Card Weekend took place from January 14–16, 2023. The Divisional round was played from January 21–22, in which the top seed in each conference played the lowest remaining seed and the two remaining teams played each other. The winners of those games advanced to the Conference Championship games, which were played on January 29. The NFC (Philadelphia) and AFC champions (Kansas City) advanced to Super Bowl LVII, which was played on February 12 at State Farm Stadium in Glendale, Arizona.

=== Bracket ===
Jan 15 – Paycor Stadium	Jan 22 – Highmark Stadium
6	Baltimore	17
3	Cincinnati	24
3	Cincinnati	27
Jan 29 – Arrowhead Stadium
Jan 15 – Highmark Stadium	2	Buffalo	10
AFC
7	Miami	31	3	Cincinnati	20
Jan 21 – Arrowhead Stadium
2	Buffalo	34	1	Kansas City	23
AFC Championship
Jan 14 – TIAA Bank Field	4	Jacksonville	20
1	Kansas City	27
5	LA Chargers	30
Divisional round	Feb 12 – State Farm Stadium
4	Jacksonville	31
Wild-card round
A1	Kansas City	38
Jan 16 – Raymond James Stadium	Jan 22 – Levi's Stadium	N1	Philadelphia	35
Super Bowl LVII
5	Dallas	31
4	Tampa Bay	14
5	Dallas	12
Jan 29 – Lincoln Financial Field
Jan 14 – Levi's Stadium	2	San Francisco	19
NFC
7	Seattle	23	2	San Francisco	7
Jan 21 – Lincoln Financial Field
2	San Francisco	41	1	Philadelphia	31
NFC Championship
Jan 15 – U.S. Bank Stadium	6	NY Giants	7
1	Philadelphia	38
6	NY Giants	31
3	Minnesota	24

== Records, milestones, and notable statistics ==
Week 1

- Matthew Stafford became the 12th player to reach 50,000 career passing yards. He also tied Drew Brees' record for the fastest player to reach this mark, doing so in 183 games.
- Matt Ryan became the eighth player to reach 60,000 career passing yards.
- Cade York kicked a 58-yard field goal, setting a record for longest field goal by a rookie in a season opener. The previous record of 55 yards was shared by John Hall and Blair Walsh.
- Tom Brady became the oldest quarterback to start a game since quarterback starts were first recorded in 1950, at 45 years and 39 days old. The previous record of 44 years, 279 days was held by Steve DeBerg. Brady ultimately extended this record to 45 years, 158 days.

Week 2

- Lamar Jackson set the record for most games with 100 rushing yards by a quarterback with 11. The previous record of 10 was held by Michael Vick.
- Jackson also became the first player to record at least 300 passing yards, three passing touchdowns, 100 rushing yards, and one rushing touchdown in a game.
- Amon-Ra St. Brown became the first player to record at least eight receptions and one receiving touchdown in six consecutive games.
- Tyreek Hill tied the record for the most games with at least 10 receptions, 150 receiving yards, and two receiving touchdowns, with four. He shares the record with Jerry Rice.
- Aaron Rodgers became the fifth player to reach 450 career touchdown passes.
- Carson Wentz became the first player since quarterback starts were first tracked in 1950 to pass for at least 300 yards and three touchdowns in his first two starts with a new team.

Week 3

- Tom Brady became the first player to reach 85,000 career passing yards.
- Aaron Donald became the second defensive tackle to record 100 career sacks since sacks became an official statistic in 1982, joining John Randle.
- Lamar Jackson became the first player with three passing touchdowns and 100 rushing yards in consecutive games.
- Jackson also became the first player with at least 10 passing touchdowns and 200 rushing yards in the first three games of the season.
- Jalen Hurts became the first player with at least 900 passing and 100 rushing yards through three games since at least 1950.

Week 4

- Patrick Mahomes became the fastest player to reach 20,000 career passing yards, doing so in 67 games. The previous record of 71 games was held by Matthew Stafford.
- The Detroit Lions set the record for most combined points scored and points allowed through a team's first four games, with 281.

Week 6

- Marcus Mariota became the second player since at least 1950 with at least two passing touchdowns, one or fewer incompletions, at least 50 rushing yards, and a rushing touchdown in a game, joining Walter Payton.

Week 7

- Mecole Hardman became the first wide receiver in the Super Bowl era with two or more rushing touchdowns and one or more receiving touchdowns in a single game.
- Joe Burrow became the first player to record two games with 500 combined offensive yards and four touchdowns.
- Burrow also set the record for most games with at least 400 passing yards in a player's first three seasons, with five. The previous record of four was held by Dan Marino.

Week 8

- Tom Brady set the record for most sacks taken by a quarterback, with 556. The previous record of 554 was held by Ben Roethlisberger.
- Alvin Kamara became the first player to record 10 games with at least one rushing and one receiving touchdown in his first six seasons.
- Christian McCaffrey became the 11th player to record a passing, rushing, and receiving touchdown in the same game.
- Derrick Henry tied the record of most games with at least 200 rushing yards, with six. He shares the record with Adrian Peterson and O. J. Simpson.
- Henry also became the first player to record at least 200 rushing yards four times against a single opponent, doing so in four consecutive games against Houston.

Week 9

- Jalen Hurts became the third quarterback under the age of 25 to start and win each of his team's first eight games of a season since at least 1950, joining Dan Marino and Jared Goff.
- Justin Fields set the record for most rushing yards in a game by a quarterback, with 178 yards. The previous record of 173 yards was held by Michael Vick.
- Fields also became the first player to rush for at least 150 yards and pass for at least three touchdowns in a game.
- Tom Brady set the record for most career game-winning drives with 55. The previous record of 54 was held by Peyton Manning.

Week 10

- Justin Jefferson set the record for most games with 100 receiving yards in a player's first three seasons, with 20. The previous record of 19 was shared by Odell Beckham Jr. and Randy Moss.
- Jefferson also set the record for most games with 150 yards in a player's first three seasons, with seven. The previous record of six was shared by Moss and Lance Alworth.
- Jefferson also tied the record for fastest player to reach 4,000 career receiving yards, doing so in 42 games. He shares the record with Beckham and Alworth.
- Patrick Mahomes set the Super Bowl era record for most touchdown passes in a player's first 75 games, with 176. The previous record of 173 was held by Dan Marino. Mahomes set this record in only 72 starts.
- Justin Fields became the first player to have multiple rushing and passing touchdowns and rush for at least 100 yards in the same game.
- Fields also set the super bowl era record for most rushing yards by a quarterback over a 5-game span, with 555.
- Tom Brady became the first quarterback to win an NFL game in three different countries outside of the US with his win in Allianz Arena, Germany.

Week 11

- Cordarrelle Patterson set the record for most career kickoffs returned for a touchdown, with nine. The previous record of eight was shared by Josh Cribbs and Leon Washington.
- Derek Carr became the quarterback with the best win percentage (.800) in overtime games (minimum 10 overtime games). The previous record of .714 was held by Tom Brady.
- Travis Kelce set the record for most games with at least 100 receiving yards by a tight end, with 33. The previous record of 32 was held by Rob Gronkowski.

Week 12

- Justin Jefferson set the record for most receiving yards in a player's first three seasons, with 4,248. The previous record of 4,163 yards was held by Randy Moss.
- Patrick Mahomes set the record for most games with 300 passing yards in a player's first seven seasons, with 38. The previous record of 37 games was held by Dan Marino. Mahomes set this record in only 6 seasons.
- Mahomes also set the record for most wins in a quarterback's first 75 starts since quarterback starts were first tracked in 1950, with 59. The previous record of 58 wins was held by Ken Stabler.
- Travis Kelce set the NFL record for most receiving yards by a tight end in his first eleven seasons, with 9,918. The previous record of 9,882 yards was held by Tony Gonzalez. Kelce needed only ten seasons to set this record.
- Jalen Hurts became the first player with at least 150 rushing yards, 150 passing yards, and two passing touchdowns in a single game since at least 1950.

Week 13

- Tom Brady set the record for fourth-quarter comebacks by a quarterback, with 44. The previous record of 43 was held by Peyton Manning.
- Justin Herbert set the record for most games with 300 passing yards in a player's first three seasons, with 20. The previous record of 19 was held by Andrew Luck.
- The Green Bay Packers passed the Chicago Bears for the most all-time franchise wins, with 787.
- Justin Fields became the first quarterback to rush for at least 50 yards and score a rushing touchdown in 6 straight appearances, since game logs were first tracked in 1950.

Week 14

- Justin Herbert set the record for the most passing yards in a player's first three seasons, with 13,056. The previous record of 12,957 was held by Andrew Luck.
- Patrick Mahomes became the fourth quarterback in the Super Bowl era to record at least 10 wins without a loss against a single opponent (Denver). He joined Luck (11–0 vs. Tennessee), Tom Brady (11–0 vs. Atlanta), and John Elway (11–0 vs. New England).
- Jalen Hurts became the second quarterback to record at least 10 rushing touchdowns in multiple seasons, joining Cam Newton. Hurts also became the first quarterback to reach the mark in consecutive seasons.
- Ja'Marr Chase became the second player with at least 2,000 receiving yards and 20 receiving touchdowns prior to his 23rd birthday, joining Randy Moss.
- Travis Kelce became the fifth tight end to reach 10,000 receiving yards. He also became the fastest tight end to reach this mark, doing so in his 140 games. The previous record of 177 games was held by Tony Gonzalez.
- Derek Carr became the third player with at least 3,000 passing yards in each of his first nine seasons, joining Peyton Manning and Russell Wilson.
- Tyreek Hill became the first player to score a touchdown in each of the following five categories: receiving, rushing, kickoff return, punt return, and fumble recovery. Hill also became the first player to score a touchdown of 50 or more yards in five different ways.

Week 15

- The Minnesota Vikings set the record for the biggest comeback win when they came back from 33 points down against the Indianapolis Colts to win 39–36 in overtime.
- Kirk Cousins set the record for most passing yards in the second half of a game, with 417.
- Justin Fields became the third quarterback to record at least 1,000 rushing yards in a season, joining Lamar Jackson and Michael Vick.
- Justin Herbert became the first player to reach at least 4,000 passing yards in each of his first three seasons.
- Derek Carr became the fourth player to record at least 35,000 passing yards in his first nine seasons, joining Matt Ryan, Peyton Manning, and Dan Marino.

Week 16

- Josh Allen set the record for the most touchdowns in a player's first five seasons, with 174. The previous record of 171 touchdowns was held by Dan Marino.
- Justin Jefferson set the record for the most games with at least 100 receiving yards in a player's first four seasons, with 24. The previous record of 23 games was held by Randy Moss.
- Kirk Cousins tied the records for most game winning drives and most fourth quarter comebacks in a season, both with eight. He shares both records with Matthew Stafford.
- Tom Brady became the first quarterback to record 250 career wins.
- Austin Ekeler became the second player to have at least ten rushing touchdowns and five receiving touchdowns in consecutive seasons, joining Marshall Faulk.
- Travis Kelce became the fifth tight end to reach 800 career receptions. Kelce also became the fastest tight end to reach the milestone, doing so in 142 games.
- Marcus Jones is the only player in the last 75 years to have a receiving, punt return and interception return touchdown in one season.

Week 17

- Tom Brady became the first player to attempt 12,000 career passes.
- Brady also became the first player to complete at least 30 passes in five consecutive games and the first player with at least 30 completions in 10 games in one season.
- Christian McCaffrey set the record for most receptions by a running back in his first six seasons, with 439. The previous record of 434 record was held by Roger Craig.
- Austin Ekeler became the third running back with at least 100 receptions and 15 touchdowns in a season, joining McCaffrey and LaDainian Tomlinson. He also became the fifth running back with at least 100 catches in a season.
- Jerick McKinnon set the record for most consecutive games with a receiving touchdown by a running back, with five.
- Patrick Mahomes became the third player with multiple 5,000-yard passing seasons, joining Drew Brees and Brady.
- Mahomes also tied the record for most wins against a single opponent with 0 losses, with 11 wins against Denver. He shares the record with Andrew Luck (11–0 against Tennessee).

Week 18

- Patrick Mahomes set the record for most total offensive yards in a season, with 5,608. The previous record of 5,562 was held by Drew Brees.
- Justin Jefferson set the record for most catches in a player's first three seasons, with 324. The previous record of 321 was held by Michael Thomas.
- The Minnesota Vikings set the record for most wins for a team with a negative point differential, as they won 13 games with a point differential of −3.
- Tom Brady set the record for most pass completions in a season, with 490, breaking his own record of 485.
- Brady also set the record for most attempts in a season, with 733. The previous record of 727 was set by Matthew Stafford.
- Aaron Rodgers became the eighth player to complete 5,000 passes.
- Nyheim Hines tied the record for most kickoff returns for a touchdown in a game, with two. He shares the record with ten other players.
- Josh Allen became the first player with three consecutive seasons of at least 35 passing touchdowns and at least five rushing touchdowns.
- Brock Purdy set the record for most wins to start his career with multiple touchdown passes in each game, with five. The previous record of four was held by Kurt Warner.
- Ryan Stonehouse set the record for punting yardage in a season, with 53.1 yards per punt. The previous record of 51.4 was held by Sammy Baugh.
- Stonehouse also set the rookie record for net punting yardage in a season, with 44.0 net yards per punt, beating the previous record of 42.6.
- Daniel Carlson set the record for the most field goals of 50 or more yards in a season, with 11. The previous record of 10 was shared by Blair Walsh, Justin Tucker, and Brandon McManus.
- Justin Herbert set the record for most combined passing and rushing touchdowns by a player in his first three seasons with 102. The previous record of 100 was held by Dan Marino.
- Herbert also became the second player to pass for at least 25 touchdowns in each of his first three seasons, joining Peyton Manning.

Wild Card Round

- Brock Purdy became the youngest player to throw for 300 yards and three touchdowns in a playoff game, at 23 years and 18 days of age. The previous record was held by Dan Marino.
- Purdy also became the first rookie to record four combined passing and rushing touchdowns in a playoff game.
- Sam Hubbard set a record for the longest fumble return in a playoff game, with a 98-yard return.
- Brett Maher set the record for most missed extra point attempts in a game, with four. The previous record of three was shared by nine players.
- The Minnesota Vikings became the first team to lose a game despite completing over 80% of passes, having no turnovers, and not allowing a sack. Such teams were previously 47–0 since sacks became an official statistic in 1982.
- Tom Brady extended his record as the oldest starting quarterback in an NFL playoff game, at 45 years, 166 days.

Divisional Round

- Travis Kelce set the record for most receptions by a tight end in a playoff game with 14. The previous record of 13 was shared by Kelce, Shannon Sharpe, and Kellen Winslow.

Conference Championship Games

- The Kansas City Chiefs became the first team to host a conference championship game in five consecutive seasons.

Super Bowl LVII

- Jason Kelce and Travis Kelce became the first set of brothers to play against each other in a Super Bowl.
- Jalen Hurts tied the record for most rushing touchdowns in a Super Bowl, with three. He shares the record with Terrell Davis. Hurts also became the first quarterback to reach this mark, breaking the record of two touchdowns previously held by Jim McMahon.
- Hurts also set the record for most rushing yards by a quarterback in the Super Bowl, with 66. The previous record of 64 was held by Steve McNair.
- Kadarius Toney set the record for the longest punt return in a Super Bowl, with a 65-yard return. The previous record of 61 yards was held by Jordan Norwood.

== Regular-season statistical leaders ==
Individual
Scoring leader	Jason Myers	Seattle	143
Most field goals made	Justin Tucker	Baltimore	37
Touchdowns	Austin Ekeler	Los Angeles Chargers	18
Rushing yards	Josh Jacobs	Las Vegas	1,653
Passing yards	Patrick Mahomes	Kansas City	5,250
Passing touchdowns	Patrick Mahomes	Kansas City	41
Interceptions thrown	Davis Mills	Houston	15
Interceptions thrown	Dak Prescott	Dallas	15
Passer rating	Tua Tagovailoa	Miami	105.5
Pass receptions	Justin Jefferson	Minnesota	128
Pass receiving yards	Justin Jefferson	Minnesota	1,809
Combined tackles	Foye Oluokun	Jacksonville	184
Interceptions	Minkah Fitzpatrick	Pittsburgh	6
Interceptions	C. J. Gardner-Johnson	Philadelphia	6
Interceptions	Justin Simmons	Denver	6
Interceptions	Tariq Woolen	Seattle	6
Punting	Ryan Stonehouse	Tennessee	4,779; avg 53.1
Sacks	Nick Bosa	San Francisco	18.5

== Awards ==
=== Individual season awards ===
The 12th NFL Honors, saluting the best players and plays from the 2022 season, was held on February 9, 2023, at the Phoenix Symphony Hall in Phoenix, Arizona.

Award	Winner	Position	Team
AP Most Valuable Player	Patrick Mahomes	QB	Kansas City Chiefs
AP Offensive Player of the Year	Justin Jefferson	WR	Minnesota Vikings
AP Defensive Player of the Year	Nick Bosa	DE	San Francisco 49ers
AP Coach of the Year	Brian Daboll	HC	New York Giants
AP Assistant Coach of the Year	DeMeco Ryans	DC	San Francisco 49ers
AP Offensive Rookie of the Year	Garrett Wilson	WR	New York Jets
AP Defensive Rookie of the Year	Sauce Gardner	CB	New York Jets
AP Comeback Player of the Year	Geno Smith	QB	Seattle Seahawks
Pepsi Rookie of the Year	Aidan Hutchinson	DE	Detroit Lions
Walter Payton NFL Man of the Year	Dak Prescott	QB	Dallas Cowboys
PFWA NFL Executive of the Year	Howie Roseman	GM	Philadelphia Eagles
Super Bowl Most Valuable Player	Patrick Mahomes	QB	Kansas City Chiefs

=== All-Pro team ===
The following players were named first-team All-Pro by the Associated Press:

Offense
QB	Patrick Mahomes (Kansas City)
RB	Josh Jacobs (Las Vegas)
WR	Justin Jefferson (Minnesota)
WR	Davante Adams (Las Vegas)
WR	Tyreek Hill (Miami)
TE	Travis Kelce (Kansas City)
LT	Trent Williams (San Francisco)
LG	Joel Bitonio (Cleveland)
C	Jason Kelce (Philadelphia)
RG	Zack Martin (Dallas)
RT	Lane Johnson (Philadelphia)

Defense
DE	Nick Bosa (San Francisco)
DE	Micah Parsons (Dallas)
DT	Quinnen Williams (New York Jets)
DT	Chris Jones (Kansas City)
LB	Fred Warner (San Francisco)
LB	Roquan Smith (Baltimore)
LB	Matt Milano (Buffalo)
CB	Patrick Surtain II (Denver)
CB	Sauce Gardner (New York Jets)
S	Minkah Fitzpatrick (Pittsburgh)
S	Talanoa Hufanga (San Francisco)

Special teams
K	Daniel Carlson (Las Vegas)
P	Tommy Townsend (Kansas City)
KR	Keisean Nixon (Green Bay)
PR	Marcus Jones (New England)
ST	Jeremy Reaves (Washington)
LS	Andrew DePaola (Minnesota)

=== Players of the Week/Month ===
The following were named the top performers during the 2022 season:

Week/ Month	Offensive Player of the Week/Month		Defensive Player of the Week/Month		Special Teams Player of the Week/Month	
Week/ Month	AFC	NFC	AFC	NFC	AFC	NFC
1	Patrick Mahomes QB (Kansas City)	Saquon Barkley RB (NY Giants)	Minkah Fitzpatrick S (Pittsburgh)	Uchenna Nwosu LB (Seattle)	Cade York K (Cleveland)	Zech McPhearson CB (Philadelphia)
2	Tua Tagovailoa QB (Miami)	Amon-Ra St. Brown WR (Detroit)	Jaylen Watson CB (Kansas City)	Darius Slay CB (Philadelphia)	Braden Mann P (NY Jets)	Graham Gano K (NY Giants)
3	Trevor Lawrence QB (Jacksonville)	Cordarrelle Patterson RB (Atlanta)	Trey Hendrickson DE (Cincinnati)	Brandon Graham DE (Philadelphia)	Corliss Waitman P (Denver)	Pat O'Donnell P (Green Bay)
Sept.	Lamar Jackson QB (Baltimore)	Jalen Hurts QB (Philadelphia)	Melvin Ingram LB (Miami)	Devin White LB (Tampa Bay)	Tommy Townsend P (Kansas City)	Mitch Wishnowsky P (San Francisco)
4	Patrick Mahomes QB (Kansas City)	Geno Smith QB (Seattle)	Jordan Poyer S (Buffalo)	Haason Reddick LB (Philadelphia)	Evan McPherson K (Cincinnati)	Greg Joseph K (Minnesota)
5	Josh Allen QB (Buffalo)	Taysom Hill TE (New Orleans)	Matthew Judon LB (New England)	Micah Parsons LB (Dallas)	Chase McLaughlin K (Indianapolis)	Cameron Dicker K (Philadelphia)
6	Josh Allen QB (Buffalo)	Marcus Mariota QB (Atlanta)	Quinnen Williams DT (NY Jets)	Tariq Woolen CB (Seattle)	Dustin Hopkins K (LA Chargers)	Ryan Wright P (Minnesota)
7	Joe Burrow QB (Cincinnati)	Daniel Jones QB (NY Giants)	Sauce Gardner CB (NY Jets)	Marco Wilson CB (Arizona)	Randy Bullock K (Tennessee)	Cairo Santos K (Chicago)
8	Derrick Henry RB (Tennessee)	Christian McCaffrey RB (San Francisco)	Dre'Mont Jones DE (Denver)	Za'Darius Smith LB (Minnesota)	Nick Folk K (New England)	Will Dissly TE (Seattle)
Oct.	Derrick Henry RB (Tennessee)	Geno Smith QB (Seattle)	Quinnen Williams DT (NY Jets)	Za'Darius Smith LB (Minnesota)	Ryan Stonehouse P (Tennessee)	Tress Way P (Washington)
9	Joe Mixon RB (Cincinnati)	Justin Fields QB (Chicago)	Justin Houston LB (Baltimore)	Kerby Joseph CB (Detroit)	Cameron Dicker K (LA Chargers)	Jake Camarda P (Tampa Bay)
10	Jonathan Taylor RB (Indianapolis)	Justin Jefferson WR (Minnesota)	Alex Highsmith LB (Pittsburgh)	Devin White LB (Tampa Bay)	Ryan Stonehouse P (Tennessee)	Joey Slye K (Washington)
11	Travis Kelce TE (Kansas City)	Tony Pollard RB (Dallas)	Matt Milano LB (Buffalo)	Aidan Hutchinson DE (Detroit)	Marcus Jones PR (New England)	Cordarrelle Patterson KR (Atlanta)
12	Josh Jacobs RB (Las Vegas)	Jalen Hurts QB (Philadelphia)	Ed Oliver DT (Buffalo)	Brian Burns DE (Carolina)	J. K. Scott P (LA Chargers)	Kene Nwangwu RB (Minnesota)
Nov.	Patrick Mahomes QB (Kansas City)	Justin Jefferson WR (Minnesota)	Derwin James S (LA Chargers)	Nick Bosa DE (San Francisco)	Tyler Bass K (Buffalo)	Joey Slye K (Washington)
13	Joe Burrow QB (Cincinnati)	Jalen Hurts QB (Philadelphia)	Chandler Jones DE (Las Vegas)	Nick Bosa DE (San Francisco)	Donovan Peoples-Jones WR (Cleveland)	Michael Badgley K (Detroit)
14	Trevor Lawrence QB (Jacksonville)	Baker Mayfield QB (LA Rams)	Josh Uche LB (New England)	Brandon Graham DE (Philadelphia)	Calais Campbell DE (Baltimore)	Eddy Piñeiro K (Carolina)
15	Josh Allen QB (Buffalo)	Kirk Cousins QB (Minnesota)	Rayshawn Jenkins S (Jacksonville)	Kayvon Thibodeaux LB (NY Giants)	Tommy Townsend P (Kansas City)	Kalif Raymond WR (Detroit)
16	Joe Burrow QB (Cincinnati)	D'Onta Foreman RB (Carolina)	Cameron Heyward DT (Pittsburgh)	Nick Bosa DE (San Francisco)	Riley Patterson K (Jacksonville)	Greg Joseph K (Minnesota)
17	Austin Ekeler RB (LA Chargers)	Mike Evans WR (Tampa Bay)	Kyle Dugger SS (New England)	Cameron Jordan DE (New Orleans)	Corey Bojorquez P (Cleveland)	Keisean Nixon CB (Green Bay)
18	Jerry Jeudy WR (Denver)	Jamaal Williams RB (Detroit)	Josh Allen OLB (Jacksonville)	Quandre Diggs S (Seattle)	Nyheim Hines RB (Buffalo)	Jake Elliott K (Philadelphia)
Dec./Jan.	Jerick McKinnon RB (Chiefs)	Christian McCaffrey RB (San Francisco)	Roquan Smith LB (Baltimore)	Haason Reddick LB (Eagles)	Cameron Dicker K (LA Chargers)	Younghoe Koo K (Atlanta)

Week	FedEx Air Player of the Week	FedEx Ground Player of the Week	Pepsi Zero Sugar Rookie of the Week
1	Patrick Mahomes (Kansas City)	Jonathan Taylor (Indianapolis)	Jahan Dotson WR (Washington)
2	Tua Tagovailoa (Miami)	Aaron Jones (Green Bay)	Garrett Wilson WR (NY Jets)
3	Jalen Hurts (Philadelphia)	Khalil Herbert (Chicago)	Romeo Doubs WR (Green Bay)
4	Jared Goff (Detroit)	Rashaad Penny (Seattle)	Breece Hall RB (NY Jets)
5	Josh Allen (Buffalo)	Taysom Hill (New Orleans)	Sauce Gardner CB (NY Jets)
6	Joe Burrow (Cincinnati)	Breece Hall (NY Jets)	Breece Hall RB (NY Jets)
7	Joe Burrow (Cincinnati)	Kenneth Walker III (Seattle)	Sauce Gardner CB (NY Jets)
8	Tua Tagovailoa (Miami)	Tony Pollard (Dallas)	Garrett Wilson WR (NY Jets)
9	Tua Tagovailoa (Miami)	Joe Mixon (Cincinnati)	Sauce Gardner CB (NY Jets)
10	Tua Tagovailoa (Miami)	Justin Fields (Chicago)	Christian Watson WR (Green Bay)
11	Joe Burrow (Cincinnati)	Jamaal Williams (Detroit)	Aidan Hutchinson DE (Detroit)
12	Mike White (NY Jets)	Josh Jacobs (Las Vegas)	Garrett Wilson WR (NY Jets)
13	Jalen Hurts (Philadelphia)	Josh Jacobs (Las Vegas)	Garrett Wilson WR (NY Jets)
14	Jared Goff (Detroit)	Christian McCaffrey (San Francisco)	Bam Knight RB (NY Jets)
15	Kirk Cousins (Minnesota)	Rhamondre Stevenson (New England)	Jahan Dotson WR (Washington)
16	Dak Prescott (Dallas)	Cam Akers (LA Rams)	Brock Purdy QB (San Francisco)
17	Tom Brady (Tampa Bay)	Jamaal Williams (Detroit)	James Houston LB (Detroit)
18	Josh Allen (Buffalo)	Kenneth Walker III (Seattle)	Brock Purdy QB (San Francisco)
POY	Joe Burrow (Cincinnati)	Josh Jacobs (Las Vegas)	Aidan Hutchinson (Detroit)

Month	Rookie of the Month	
Month	Offensive	Defensive
Sept.	Chris Olave WR (New Orleans)	Devin Lloyd LB (Jacksonville)
Oct.	Kenneth Walker III RB (Seattle)	Tariq Woolen CB (Seattle)
Nov.	Christian Watson WR (Green Bay)	Aidan Hutchinson DE (Detroit)
Dec./Jan.	Brock Purdy QB (San Francisco)	Aidan Hutchinson DE (Detroit)

== Notable events ==
=== Brian Flores' discrimination lawsuit ===
On February 1, former Miami Dolphins head coach Brian Flores sued the NFL, the Dolphins, the New York Giants, and the Denver Broncos, alleging racism, violations of federal employment law, and that his interviews were a sham meant solely to fulfill the Rooney Rule. The lawsuit also alleges that during Flores' tenure with the Dolphins, team owner Stephen M. Ross pressured him to deliberately lose games, offering him $100,000 for each game he lost in order for the Dolphins to get better draft picks for the following season and that Ross fired Flores after he refused to comply with this pressure. The lawsuit seeks damages and injunctive relief in the form of changes to hiring, retention, termination, and pay transparency practices for coaching and executive positions in the NFL.

On April 6, former Arizona Cardinals head coach Steve Wilks and former assistant coach Ray Horton joined the lawsuit with similar allegations against the league, the Arizona Cardinals, Houston Texans, and Tennessee Titans.

=== Deshaun Watson sexual assault allegations ===
In March and April 2021, then-Houston Texans quarterback Deshaun Watson was accused by 22 massage therapists of sexual misconduct.

On March 11, 2022, a grand jury declined to indict Watson on criminal charges related to "harassment and sexual misconduct". On that date he still faced 22 civil lawsuits, many alleging sexual misconduct and assault. After being cleared of criminal charges, Watson was traded to the Cleveland Browns and agreed to a new, fully guaranteed, five-year, $230 million contract with the Browns, the most guaranteed money in NFL history.

After two more accusers joined the lawsuit in June 2022, Watson settled 23 of the 24 lawsuits in July and August.

On August 1, as a result of these allegations, Watson was suspended for six regular season games to start the 2022 season by judge Sue Lewis Robinson. Two days later, the NFL appealed the suspension, seeking to extend the suspension to at least a full season as well as seeking a fine and establishing a requirement for Watson to seek treatment for his conduct. The appeal was reviewed by former New Jersey Attorney General Peter C. Harvey.

On August 18, after the NFL and the NFLPA reached a settlement, Watson was suspended for the first 11 games of the season and was fined $5 million.

=== Miami Dolphins tampering ===
On August 2, it was announced that following a six-month independent investigation by Mary Jo White and a team of lawyers, the Miami Dolphins would forfeit their 2023 first-round draft pick and a 2024 third-round pick for violating the league's anti-tampering policy on three occasions from 2019 to 2022 by engaging in impermissible conversations with quarterback Tom Brady and coach Sean Payton, both of whom were under contract with other teams. Dolphins owner Stephen M. Ross was also fined $1.5 million and suspended through October 17, and was prohibited from being at the Dolphins' facility or representing the team at any event until then. He was also prohibited from attending any league meeting before the annual meeting in 2023 and was removed from all league committees indefinitely. Vice chairman/limited partner Bruce Beal was fined $500,000 and was not permitted to attend any league meetings for the rest of the 2022 season.

=== Sale of the Denver Broncos ===
On August 9, the league owners unanimously approved the sale of the Denver Broncos from the trust of Pat Bowlen to a group consisting of Rob Walton, Carrie Walton Penner, Greg Penner, Mellody Hobson, Condoleezza Rice, and Lewis Hamilton for $4.65 billion.

=== Damar Hamlin cardiac arrest ===
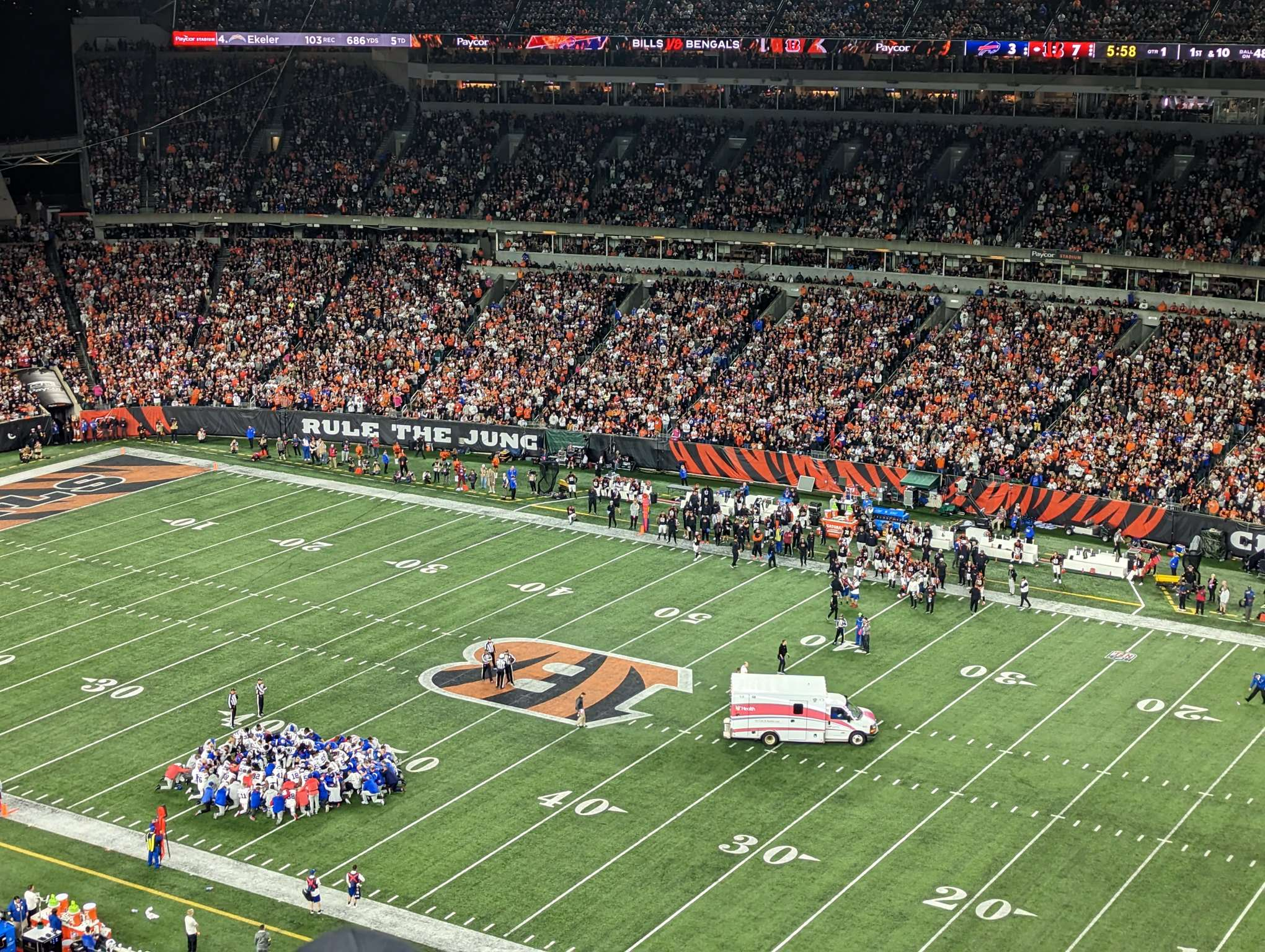
Damar Hamlin is removed from Paycor Stadium in an ambulance.

During the week 17 Monday Night Football game on January 2 between Buffalo and Cincinnati, Buffalo safety Damar Hamlin collapsed and remained motionless after making a tackle on Cincinnati wide receiver Tee Higgins. Medical staff rushed to his side near midfield to perform CPR, and used a defibrillator on Hamlin before taking him by ambulance to the University of Cincinnati Medical Center. It was later revealed that he had gone into cardiac arrest and was in critical condition. The game was halted, and the two teams returned to their locker rooms. At the time, there was 5:58 remaining in the first quarter, with Cincinnati leading 7–3.

It was reported by both ESPN and Westwood One that play would resume and teams would be given a warm-up period for five minutes. However, the game remained suspended, and the NFL later denied the reports it planned to compel the teams to finish the game that evening. Shortly after 10 p.m., an hour after Hamlin's medical emergency, the game was postponed until further notice by the NFL.

The following day, the NFL released a statement saying the game would not be resumed that week, but that it had not made a decision on when or whether it would be rescheduled. On January 5, the NFL announced that the game would be canceled entirely, saying, it was "difficult, but necessary" under the "extraordinary circumstances". It was the first time since the 1987 players' strike that a regular season game was canceled. Addressing the implications for team standings and playoffs, it said "not playing the Buffalo-Cincinnati game to its conclusion will have no effect on which clubs qualify for the postseason. No club would qualify for the postseason and no club will be eliminated based on the outcome of this game." As a result, both teams finished the season with only 16 regular season games, making it the first time since 1935 in which some teams played more regular season games than the others.

== Head coaching and front office changes ==
=== Head coaches ===
==== Off-season ====
Team	Departing coach	Interim coach	Incoming coach	Reason for leaving	Notes
Chicago Bears	Matt Nagy		Matt Eberflus	Fired	Nagy was fired on January 10 after four seasons with the Bears. During his tenure, the Bears were 34–31 (.523) with one NFC North division title in two overall playoff appearances, both ending with first round losses. Eberflus, who spent the previous four seasons as the Indianapolis Colts defensive coordinator, was hired on January 27. This is his first head coaching position.
Denver Broncos	Vic Fangio		Nathaniel Hackett	Fired	Fangio was fired on January 9 after three seasons with the Broncos. During his tenure, the Broncos were 19–30 (.388) with no playoff appearances. Hackett, who spent the previous three seasons as the Green Bay Packers offensive coordinator, was hired on January 27. This was his first head coaching position.
Houston Texans	David Culley		Lovie Smith	Fired	Culley was fired on January 13 after one season with the Texans, finishing with a 4–13 (.235) record and missing the playoffs. Smith, who spent the previous season as Houston's defensive coordinator and associate head coach, was hired on February 7. This was his third head coaching position in the NFL. As the head coach of the Chicago Bears from 2004–2012, the team's overall record was 81–63 (.563), with three playoff appearances, three NFC North division titles, an appearance in Super Bowl XLI, and a 3–3 (.500) playoff record. He also won AP NFL Coach of the Year Award in 2005. As the head coach of the Tampa Bay Buccaneers from 2014–2015, the team was 8–24 (.250), with no playoff appearances.
Jacksonville Jaguars	Urban Meyer	Darrell Bevell	Doug Pederson	Fired	Meyer was fired on December 16, 2021, due to a season full of on- and off-the-field issues. During Meyer's single partial season in Jacksonville, the Jaguars were 2–11 (.154). Bevell, the team's offensive coordinator since 2021, was promoted to interim head coach. This is his second head coaching position, after serving as interim head coach for the Detroit Lions in 2020, where he obtained a record of 1–4 (.200). He finished out the 2021 season with a 1–3 (.250) record. Pederson was hired on February 3. He was the head coach of the Philadelphia Eagles from 2016 to 2020 with a record of 42–37–1 (.531), three playoff appearances with a record of 4–2 (.667), two NFC East division titles, and the Super Bowl LII championship.
Las Vegas Raiders	Jon Gruden	Rich Bisaccia	Josh McDaniels	Resigned	Gruden resigned on October 11, 2021, due to the publication of controversial emails prior to becoming the Raiders head coach. In Gruden's 3+ seasons during his second stint with Oakland/Las Vegas, the Raiders were 22–31 (.415) with no playoff appearances. Bisaccia, the team's special teams coordinator and assistant head coach since 2018, was promoted to interim head coach. This was his first head coaching position after 20 years as an assistant coach in the NFL. He finished out the 2021 regular season with a 7–5 (.583) record, leading the Raiders to a Wild Card playoff appearance. McDaniels, who spent the previous 10 seasons as the New England Patriots offensive coordinator and quarterbacks coach (and a total of 18 seasons as an assistant coach with New England in two stints), was hired on January 31. He was the head coach of the Denver Broncos from 2009–2010 with a record of 11–17 (.393) and no playoff appearances.
Miami Dolphins	Brian Flores		Mike McDaniel	Fired	Flores was fired on January 10 after three seasons with the Dolphins. During his tenure, the Dolphins were 24–25 (.490) with no playoff appearances. McDaniel, who spent the previous five seasons as the San Francisco 49ers offensive and run game coordinator, was hired on February 6. This is his first head coaching position.
Minnesota Vikings	Mike Zimmer		Kevin O'Connell	Fired	Zimmer was fired on January 10 after eight seasons with the Vikings. During his tenure, the Vikings were 72–56–1 (.562) with two NFC North division titles in three overall playoff appearances, one NFC Championship Game appearance, and a playoff record of 2–3 (.400). O'Connell, who spent the previous two seasons as the Los Angeles Rams offensive coordinator, was hired on February 16. This is his first head coaching position.
New Orleans Saints	Sean Payton		Dennis Allen	Retired	Payton retired on January 25 after 15 seasons with the Saints. His overall record was 152–89 (.631), with nine playoff appearances including seven NFC South titles, the Super Bowl XLIV title, and a playoff record of 9–8 (.529). He also won AP NFL Coach of the Year Award in 2006. Allen, who spent the previous seven seasons as the Saints defensive coordinator (and a total of 12 seasons as an assistant coach with New Orleans in two stints), was hired on February 8. This is his second head coaching position; he had previously served as head coach of the Oakland Raiders from 2012–2014, with a record of 8–28 (.222) and no playoff appearances.
New York Giants	Joe Judge		Brian Daboll	Fired	Judge was fired on January 11 after two seasons with the Giants. During his tenure, the Giants were 10–23 (.303) with no playoff appearances. Daboll, who spent the previous four seasons as the Buffalo Bills offensive coordinator, was hired on January 28. This is his first head coaching position.
Tampa Bay Buccaneers	Bruce Arians		Todd Bowles	Retired	Arians announced his retirement on March 30 after three seasons with the Buccaneers. During his tenure, the Buccaneers were 31–18 (.633) with two playoff appearances including one NFC South title, the Super Bowl LV title, and a playoff record of 5–1 (.833). Arians had previously retired following the 2017 season after five seasons with the Arizona Cardinals, spending one year as a commentator for CBS before returning to coaching. Bowles, who spent the previous three seasons as the Buccaneers' defensive coordinator, was promoted the same day. This is his third head coaching position; he had previously served as interim head coach of the Miami Dolphins for the last three weeks of the 2011 season, and as head coach of the New York Jets from 2015–2018, with a combined record of 26–41 (.388) and no playoff appearances.

==== In-season ====
Team	Departing coach	Reason for leaving	Interim replacement	Notes
Carolina Panthers	Matt Rhule	Fired	Steve Wilks	After a 1–4 start, Rhule was fired October 10 after 2+ seasons with the team. During his tenure, the Panthers were 11–27 (.289) with no playoff appearances. Wilks, the team's defensive pass game coordinator and secondary coach, took over as interim coach. This is his second NFL head coaching position, having previously been the head coach of the Arizona Cardinals in 2018, with a record of 3–13 (.188) and no playoff appearances.
Indianapolis Colts	Frank Reich	Fired	Jeff Saturday	Reich was fired on November 7 after starting the season 3–5–1 (.389). In 5+ seasons with the Colts, Reich was 40–33–1 (.547), with 2 playoff appearances and a playoff record of 1–2 (.333). Saturday, a 6-time Pro Bowler who played 14 seasons as a center in the NFL (13 with the Colts), and current consultant for the team, was named interim head coach. His only previous coaching experience at any level was for Hebron Christian Academy in Dacula, Georgia. He is the first coach hired with no prior coaching experience either in the NFL or college since Norm Van Brocklin in 1961.
Denver Broncos	Nathaniel Hackett	Fired	Jerry Rosburg	Hackett was fired on December 26, after a 4–11 (.267) tenure, missing the playoffs in his only partial season with the team. Rosburg, the team's senior assistant to the head coach, was named interim head coach. This is his first head coaching position; he previously served as the Baltimore Ravens special team coordinator for eleven seasons.

=== Front office personnel ===
==== Off-season ====
Team	Position	Departing office holder	Incoming office holder	Reason for leaving	Notes
Baltimore Ravens	President	Dick Cass	Sashi Brown	Retired	Cass retired on February 4 after 18 years with the team, during which the Ravens won Super Bowl XLVII. Brown was hired the same day, effective April 1. He was previously the Cleveland Browns' GM from 2016 to 2017.
Denver Broncos	President	Joe Ellis	Damani Leech	Resigned	Ellis stepped down from his position as president and CEO on August 9 after the sale of the team. He had served with the Broncos for 27 years, the last eight as CEO. Leech was hired on August 11. He was the COO of NFL International from 2019 until the hiring.
Las Vegas Raiders	President	Dan Ventrelle	Sandra Douglass Morgan	Fired	After about 19 years with the Raiders including one season as president, Ventrelle was fired on May 6. Ventrelle alleged he was fired for reporting a hostile work environment. Douglass Morgan was hired on July 7. She previously served as chairwoman of the Nevada Gaming Control Board from 2019 to 2020. She is the first black female president in NFL history.
Chicago Bears	General manager	Ryan Pace	Ryan Poles	Fired	After seven years with the Bears, Pace was fired on January 10. Poles was hired on January 25. He previously served for the Kansas City Chiefs from 2009 to 2021 in various executive roles and in the final year as the executive director of player personnel.
Las Vegas Raiders	General manager	Mike Mayock	Dave Ziegler	Fired	After three years with the Raiders, Mayock was fired on January 17. Ziegler was hired on January 30. He previously served for the New England Patriots from 2013 to 2021 in various executive roles and in the final year as the director of player personnel.
Minnesota Vikings	General manager	Rick Spielman	Kwesi Adofo-Mensah	Fired	After sixteen years with the Vikings and ten years as the GM, Spielman was fired on January 10. Adofo-Mensah was hired on January 26. He previously served as the vice president of football operations for the Cleveland Browns from 2020 to 2021 and also served for the San Francisco 49ers in football research and development.
New York Giants	General manager	Dave Gettleman	Joe Schoen	Retired	After four years as the Giants GM and fourteen years total over two tenures with the team, Gettleman announced his retirement on January 10. Schoen was hired on January 21. He previously served as the assistant GM for the Buffalo Bills from 2017 to 2021 and also served for the Carolina Panthers and Miami Dolphins in various executive roles.
Pittsburgh Steelers	General manager	Kevin Colbert	Omar Khan	Retired	After eleven years as the Steelers GM, six years additionally as vice president, and 22 years total with the team in various executive roles, Colbert retired after the 2022 NFL draft. Khan was hired on May 25. He has served in various roles with the Steelers for 21 years, most recently as the vice president of football and business administration since 2016.

==== In-season ====
Team	Position	2022 office holder	Reason for leaving	Interim replacement	Notes
Tennessee Titans	General manager	Jon Robinson	Fired	Ryan Cowden	Robinson was fired on December 6 after 6+ seasons as the Titans' GM, despite a relatively successful tenure with the Titans, including 2 AFC South titles, 4 playoff appearances, and an AFC Championship appearance in 2019. Cowden, the team's vice president of player personnel, will serve as interim GM for the rest of the season.

== Stadiums ==
- This is the final year on Buffalo's lease on Highmark Stadium. On March 28, the State of New York announced an agreement with the team to construct a new state owned and funded stadium adjacent to Highmark Stadium, which will be demolished after the new stadium is completed. Buffalo will remain at Highmark Stadium during the new stadium's construction, then will move to the new stadium once it is complete and play there through at least 2052, leasing the stadium from the state.
- On July 11, Pittsburgh announced that it sold the naming rights to its home stadium to the insurance broker Acrisure after its deal with Heinz expired, resulting in the stadium being renamed from Heinz Field to Acrisure Stadium.
- On August 9, Cincinnati announced that it sold the naming rights to its home stadium to human resources software company Paycor, resulting in the stadium being renamed from Paul Brown Stadium to Paycor Stadium.

== Uniforms ==
=== Uniform changes ===
- Dallas announced the return of their throwbacks inspired by the team's uniforms worn from 1960 to 1963 on July 21. They wore them on Thanksgiving Day and for the first time since the 2012 season.
- Green Bay announced the return of the all-white uniforms used in the NFL's former Color Rush program for one game. The uniform features Green Bay's typical white jerseys with white pants. They used this combination for the first time since 2019.
- The Los Angeles Rams swapped the designation of their white uniforms. The throwback-inspired white uniforms introduced as an alternate in 2021 now serve as the team's primary. The "bone" uniform serves as the third design and was worn for two games.
- New England announced the return of their red "Pat Patriot" throwback uniforms as an alternate uniform on June 22. They donned this design for the first time since the 2012 season. The Patriots reintroduced their silver pants on October 24, wearing them for the first time since the team's 2020 uniform redesign.
- New Orleans announced the return of their late-1960s home throwbacks on November 16. They were worn for one game. The team last wore this uniform in 2016.
- The New York Giants announced the return of their uniforms worn between 1980 and 1999 for two games on July 20.
- Philadelphia introduced a new wordmark, replacing the previous design installed in 1996. The team would not adopt the new wordmark on the actual uniforms until 2024.
- Pittsburgh wore a throwback uniform for one game modeled after their design worn during the 1972 season. These uniforms commemorated the 50th anniversary of the Immaculate Reception and were worn for the first time since 2019.
- San Francisco modified their uniforms to feature their classic wordmark, matching their home end zone design. The uniforms include three shoulder stripes, replacing the two stripe design.
- Washington revealed new branding as the Washington Commanders on February 2. They retained their burgundy and gold colors while introducing a new "W" logo and new uniforms. The new burgundy uniforms have gold numerals trimmed in white, while the new white uniforms feature burgundy and white gradient numerals with black trim. The team also introduced black third jerseys with gold numerals trimmed in burgundy.

=== Alternate helmets ===
In June 2021, the NFL approved a rule that would allow teams to wear alternate helmets for the 2022 season, repealing a one-helmet rule put in place in 2013. Alternate helmets are required to be accompanied with alternate uniforms.

- Arizona introduced a black helmet with a red undertone on July 24. The helmet was worn for one preseason game and two regular season games.
- Atlanta reintroduced a red helmet to pair with their throwback uniform on June 1 after previously using the helmet with this set from 2009 to 2012. They were worn for two games during the team's 2022 campaign.
- Carolina introduced a new black helmet on July 19. This helmet was worn with the team's all-black uniform for one game. Carolina's black uniform remained their primary colored design despite the rule which requires that alternate helmets be paired with alternate uniforms.
- Chicago introduced an orange helmet on July 24. It is paired with Chicago's alternate orange uniforms for two games.
- Cincinnati introduced a white alternate helmet on July 14. The design retains the helmet's black stripes and is accompanied with their all-white uniforms used in the former "Color Rush" program.
- Dallas announced their alternate throwback uniform listed above will include the white helmet worn by the team from 1960 to 1963. Additionally, Dallas wore an alternative set of decals with the white shell to pair with the "Color Rush" uniform introduced in 2015.
- Houston introduced a "Battle Red" helmet to pair with their like-colored alternate uniform on July 12. It is the first time that the team will utilize a different colored helmet in franchise history (the team has used "Deep Steel Blue" helmets since their inception in 2002). The helmet was worn for one game.
- New England's alternate throwback uniform listed above includes a white helmet with the former "Pat Patriot" logo.
- New Orleans introduced a new black helmet to pair with their white alternate uniform on June 16.
- The New York Giants announced as part of the above throwback uniform, they will bring back the navy blue helmets with the "GIANTS" wordmark worn in the 1980s and 1990s.
- The New York Jets introduced a new black helmet to pair with their black alternate uniforms on July 22.
- Philadelphia introduced a new black helmet to pair with their black alternate uniform on March 29.
- Washington introduced a new alternate set with black helmets in their rebrand on February 2, becoming the first team in the league to unveil secondary helmets. The helmets feature the gold "W" logo on the front of the shell, the player's jersey number on each side, and the flag of Washington, D.C. in burgundy and gold on the back.

=== Patches ===
- Buffalo wore a patch with the number 3 on it in week 18 in support of Damar Hamlin after his in-game collapse the previous week.
- Miami announced a patch to celebrate the 50th anniversary of the team's 1972 undefeated season on August 3. The patch was featured on their throwback uniform for one game.
- Pittsburgh will accompany their 1972-inspired throwback uniforms with a patch to commemorate the Immaculate Reception's 50th anniversary. The patch features a silhouetted Franco Harris.
- Washington unveiled a logo commemorating the 90th anniversary of the franchise.

=== Diversity initiative ===
During weeks 4 and 5, players, executives, and coaches wore patches and decals of international flags to represent their national heritage. Over 50 countries and territories were represented, with over 200 individuals participating.

== Media ==
=== Television ===
This was the ninth and final season under the current broadcast contracts with CBS, Fox, and NBC, before new 11-year contracts for all three networks begin in 2023. This included "cross-flexing" (switching) Sunday afternoon games between CBS and Fox before or during the season, regardless of the conference of the visiting team. Super Bowl LVII was televised by Fox in English and Fox Deportes in Spanish.

Following the expiration of their eight-year contract, ESPN and ABC agreed to a one-year bridge contract for the 2022 season, before their new 11-year contract takes effect in 2023 to coincide with those of the other three broadcasters. As with the previous season, ESPN held the rights to a Saturday doubleheader during the final week of the season, simulcast with ABC, along with more simulcasts of select Monday Night Football games on ABC. Also this year, ABC aired its first exclusive game since 2005 on September 19, as part of a split-network doubleheader with ESPN.

Under separate deals, this was the second postseason in NBC and ABC/ESPN's seven- and five-year deals to air the Sunday and Monday night Wild Card games, respectively. Fox replaced CBS in televising two Wild Card games during this postseason.

The 2022 season was the first time that three games aired on Christmas Day, consisting of an afternoon doubleheader on CBS and Fox. with the traditional Sunday Night football game on NBC.

NFL Network continued to televise select regular season games, including three International Series games.

Fox Deportes aired Spanish-language coverage of Fox games. ESPN Deportes did the same for ESPN/ABC games, CBS games was available on SAP, and Universo/ Telemundo Deportes (select games) did the same for NBC games.

ESPN2's Monday Night Football with Peyton and Eli was renewed for an additional season, taking it through the 2024 NFL season. CBS will continue to produce alternative, youth-oriented telecasts of selected games on sister channel Nickelodeon; in lieu of a Wild Card playoff game, like in previous years, Nickelodeon simulcast CBS's Christmas Day game, marking its first regular-season broadcast.

This was the final season under DirecTV's deal for exclusive rights to the NFL Sunday Ticket out-of-market sports package. DirecTV has held exclusive rights since the package's launch in 1994. DirecTV executives have questioned the current value of NFL Sunday Ticket after losing money over the past few years. In September 2021, NFL Commissioner Roger Goodell suggested that NFL Sunday Ticket could be more attractive on a digital platform. On December 22, 2022, it was announced that Google had acquired the rights to Sunday Ticket and that it would be streamed on YouTube TV and YouTube Primetime Channels starting in 2023.

=== Streaming ===
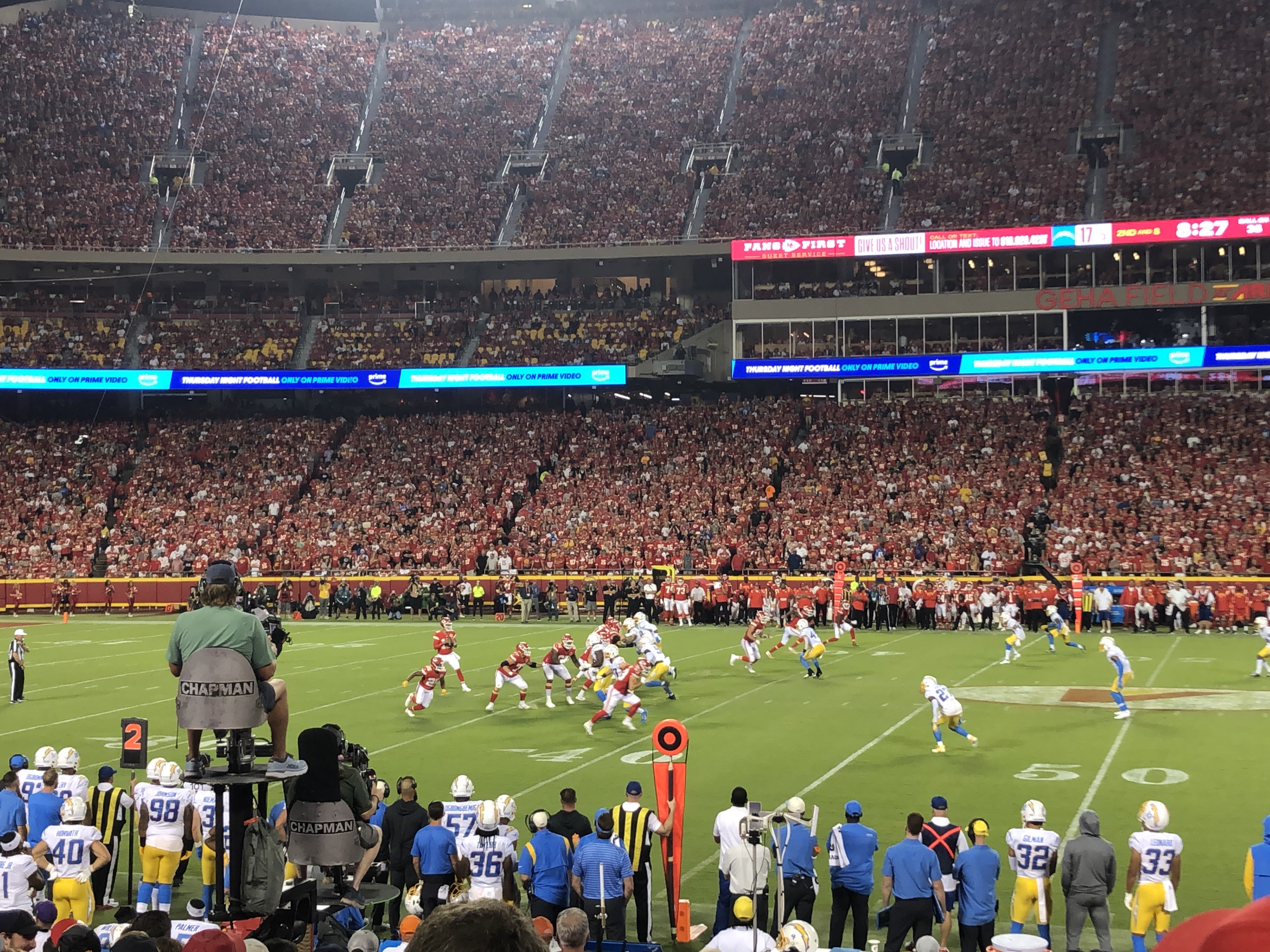
The Chargers and Chiefs playing in the first Thursday Night Football game broadcast exclusively on Amazon Prime Video.

This was the first year of a 12-year deal in which Thursday Night Football exclusively streamed on Amazon Prime Video and Twitch (outside of the home markets which those games will still air on local over the air broadcast stations). Fox and NFL Network opted out of their final season of the previous five year (2018–2022) TNF deal, allowing Amazon to take over one season before its original eleven year (2023–2033) TNF agreement was to go into effect. Additionally, all TNF games now kick off at 8:15 p.m. ET, a five-minute shift from the 8:20 p.m. ET start time from the previous seasons.

This was also the first year of a 12-year deal in which ESPN+ exclusively streamed one game per year.

Paramount+ continues to simulcast all CBS games and Peacock simulcasts all NBC games.

The NFL's mobile streaming contract with Verizon expired following the 2021 season (which included mobile streaming of live local and nationally televised games along with cellular streaming of NFL Network); it was reported that the league was preparing to move these rights behind a paywall of an in-house subscription service. In July, the NFL announced that NFL Game Pass would be replaced in the United States by NFL+, which will stream in-market games and the NFL Network on mobile devices only, radio broadcasts for all games, and most out-of-market preseason games. The on-demand full, condensed, and "All 22" bird's-eye view game replays offered by NFL Game Pass will now be under a premium tier of NFL+.

=== Radio ===
In March, the NFL renewed its national radio contract with Westwood One, maintaining its package of radio rights to all primetime, marquee, and playoff games, while adding audio coverage of other events such as the NFL draft and NFL Honors. It also greatly expands the ability for its broadcasts to be distributed for free via digital platforms, including via local affiliates' "primary digital platforms", and via the NFL app. Compass Media, ESPN Radio and Sports USA will continue to broadcast select Sunday afternoon games nationally on radio.

=== Personnel changes ===
On March 16, ESPN signed Joe Buck and Troy Aikman — who were Fox's lead commentary team for 20 seasons — to a multi-year deal to become the new lead commentators of Monday Night Football. ESPN's previous MNF broadcasters Steve Levy and Louis Riddick continued as ESPN's secondary NFL broadcast team, with Dan Orlovsky replacing Brian Griese who left ESPN for a coaching job with San Francisco.

On March 23, Amazon announced that longtime NBC play-by-play announcer Al Michaels and ESPN college football analyst Kirk Herbstreit would serve as its lead broadcast team for Thursday Night Football. Amazon later added ABC News reporter Kaylee Hartung as its sideline reporter. Mike Tirico—who had been NBC's secondary play-by-play announcer and Michaels' designated fill-in since joining NBC in 2016—succeeded Michaels as the lead commentator for Sunday Night Football, with Maria Taylor succeeding him as lead studio host and Jason Garrett replacing Drew Brees on the Football Night in America panel. Melissa Stark replaced Michele Tafoya as sideline reporter. Amazon's studio panel will be led by Fox's Charissa Thompson, with analysts Tony Gonzalez, Ryan Fitzpatrick, Richard Sherman, and Andrew Whitworth. Bleacher Report and Turner Sports' Taylor Rooks and NBC's Michael Smith also made contributions.

With Buck and Aikman's departure, Fox's number-2 commentary team of Kevin Burkhardt and Greg Olsen were promoted to Fox's top pairing. Replacing Burkhardt and Olsen were Joe Davis and Daryl Johnston, starting his third stint as Fox's number 2 analyst. Kristina Pink, who was one of Fox's two TNF reporters from 2018 to 2021, returned to Sunday reporting duties to join the team of Adam Amin and Mark Schlereth. Robert Smith also moved from Fox's college football coverage to join Chris Myers.

=== Most watched regular season games ===
- DH = doubleheader; Single = singleheader SNF = Sunday Night Football; MNF = Monday Night Football; TNF = Thursday Night Football

Rank	Date	Matchup			Network(s)	Viewers (millions)	TV rating	Window	Significance
1	November 24, 4:30 ET	New York Giants	20–28	Dallas Cowboys	Fox/Fox Deportes	42.1	12.7	Thanksgiving	Cowboys–Giants rivalry, most watched regular-season game in NFL history
2	November 24, 12:30 ET	Buffalo Bills	28–25	Detroit Lions	CBS/Paramount+	31.8	11.8	Thanksgiving	
3	November 13, 4:25 ET	Dallas Cowboys	28–31	Green Bay Packers	Fox	29.2	14.9	Late DH^{[a]}	Cowboys–Packers rivalry, Mike McCarthy's return to Green Bay
4	December 24, 4:25 ET	Philadelphia Eagles	34–40	Dallas Cowboys	Fox	27.8	12.0	Late DH^{[e]}	Cowboys–Eagles rivalry
5	November 20, 4:25 ET	Dallas Cowboys	40–3	Minnesota Vikings	CBS/Paramount+	27.5	13.7	Late DH^{[b]}	Cowboys–Vikings rivalry
6	September 18, 4:25 ET	Cincinnati Bengals	17–20	Dallas Cowboys	CBS/Paramount+	27.4	14.1	Late DH^{[c]}	
7	September 25, 4:25 ET	Green Bay Packers	14–12	Tampa Bay Buccaneers	Fox	26.4	13.4	Late DH^{[d]}	2020 NFC Championship rematch
8	December 25, 1:00 ET	Green Bay Packers	26–20	Miami Dolphins	Fox	25.9	10.7	Christmas	
9	October 16, 4:25 ET	Buffalo Bills	24–20	Kansas City Chiefs	CBS/Paramount+	25.4	13.2	Late DH^{[e]}	2021 AFC Divisional Round rematch
10	November 24, 8:20 ET	New England Patriots	26–33	Minnesota Vikings	NBC/Peacock/Telemundo	25.3	9.7	Thanksgiving	

*Note – All single and DH matchups listed in table are the matchups that were viewed to the largest percentage of the market.

1. DAL/GB was shown in 92% of the markets during the late doubleheader time slot of Fox coverage.
2. DAL/MIN was shown in 90% of the markets during the late doubleheader time slot of CBS coverage.
3. CIN/DAL was shown in 81% of the markets during the late doubleheader time slot of CBS coverage.
4. GB/TB was shown in 83% of the markets during the late doubleheader time slot of Fox coverage.
5. BUF/KC and PHI/DAL were shown nationally during the late doubleheader time slot.

In addition, the January 2, Buffalo–Cincinnati game averaged 23.8 million viewers across ABC, ESPN, and ESPN2 from approximately 8:30 pm to 10:09 pm, making it the most-watched Monday Night Football broadcast since the series was moved to ESPN in 2006.
