= Hail Mary pass =

Long pass play in American football usually made in desperation

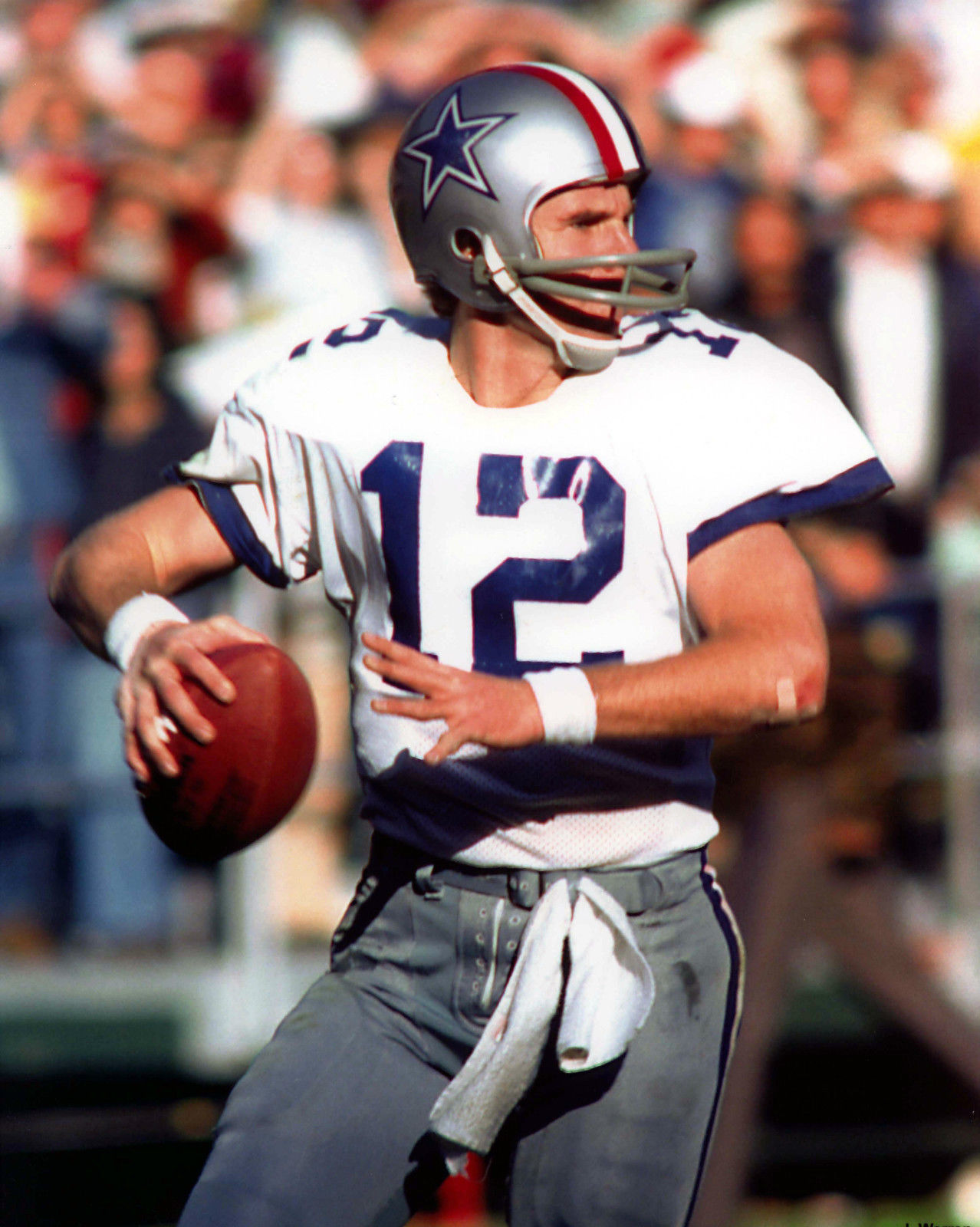
Roger Staubach, the thrower of the game-winning touchdown pass to wide receiver Drew Pearson during an NFL playoff game between the Dallas Cowboys and the Minnesota Vikings on December 28, 1975

A Hail Mary pass is a very long forward pass in American football, typically made in desperation, with a very small chance of achieving a completion. Due to the difficulty of a completion with this pass, it makes reference to the Catholic "Hail Mary" prayer for strength and help.

The expression goes back at least to the 1930s, when it was used publicly by Elmer Layden and Jim Crowley, two former members of the Notre Dame Fighting Irish's Four Horsemen. Originally meaning any sort of desperation play, a Hail Mary pass gradually came to denote a long, low-probability pass, typically of the "alley-oop" variety, attempted at the end of a half when a team is too far from the end zone to execute a more conventional play, implying that it would take a miracle for the play to succeed. For more than 40 years, use of the term was largely confined to Notre Dame and other Catholic universities.

The term became widespread after an NFL playoff game between the Dallas Cowboys and the Minnesota Vikings on December 28, 1975 (see Cowboys–Vikings rivalry), when Cowboys quarterback Roger Staubach (a devout Catholic) said about his game-winning touchdown pass to wide receiver Drew Pearson, "I closed my eyes and said a Hail Mary."

== Origins ==
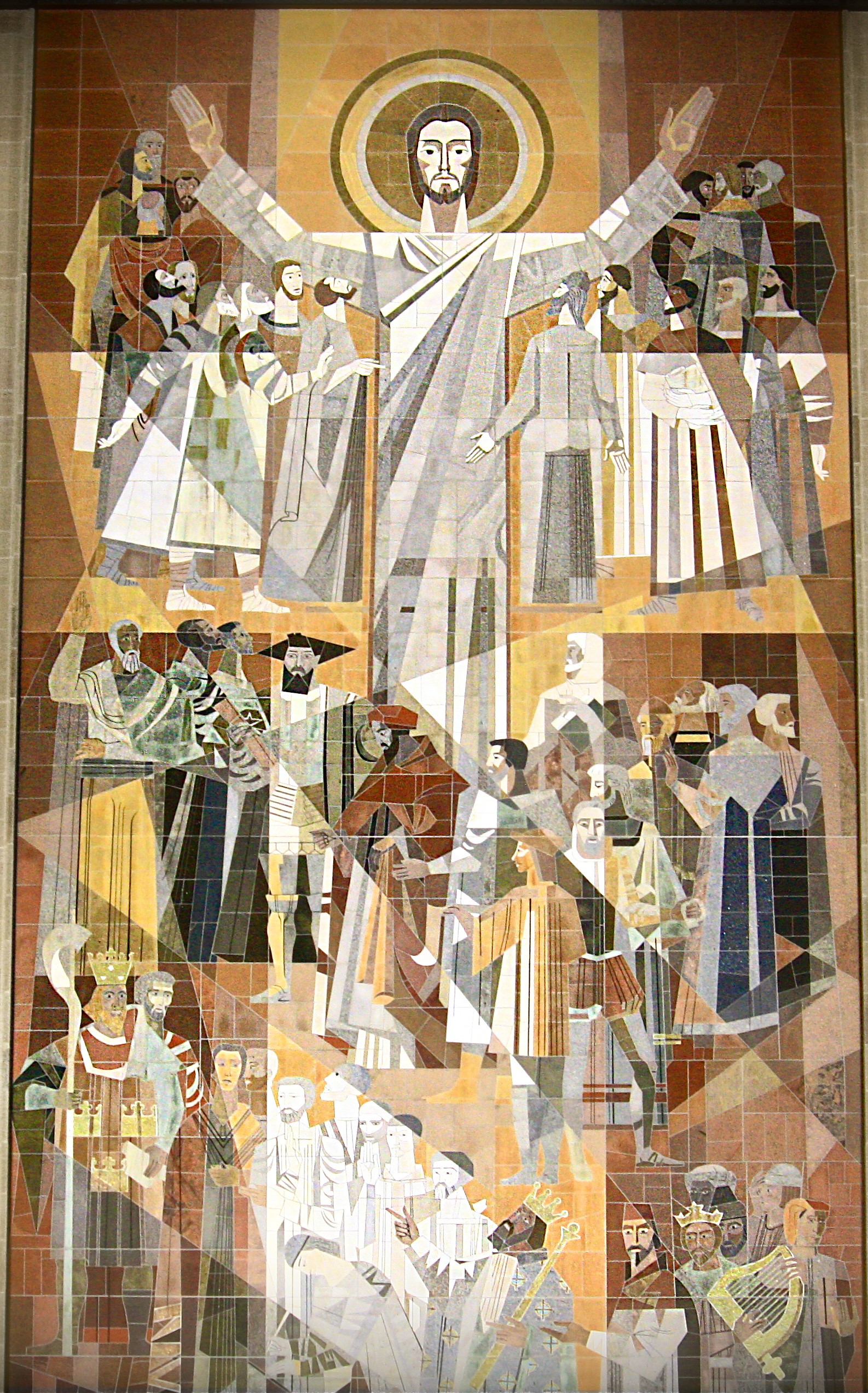
The Catholic-inspired name of the play derives from its early use at the University of Notre Dame and its frequent fusion of religious and football imagery (such as in Touchdown Jesus, pictured above)

Crowley often told the story of a game between Notre Dame and Georgia Tech on October 28, 1922, in which the Fighting Irish players said Hail Mary prayers together before scoring each of the touchdowns, before winning the game 13–3. According to Crowley, it was one of the team's linemen, Noble Kizer (a Presbyterian), who suggested praying before the first touchdown, which occurred on a fourth and goal play at the Georgia Tech 6-yard line during the second quarter. Quarterback Harry Stuhldreher, another of the Horsemen, threw a quick pass over the middle to Paul Castner for the score. The ritual was repeated before a third and goal play, again at Georgia Tech's 6-yard line, in the fourth quarter. This time Stuhldreher ran for a touchdown, which sealed the win for Notre Dame. After the game, Kizer exclaimed to Crowley, "Say, that Hail Mary is the best play we've got." Crowley related this story many times in public speeches beginning in the 1930s.

On November 2, 1935, with 32 seconds left in the so-called "Game of the Century" between Ohio State and Notre Dame, Irish halfback Bill Shakespeare found receiver Wayne Millner for a 19-yard, game-winning touchdown. Notre Dame head coach Elmer Layden, who had played in the 1922 Georgia Tech game, afterwards called it a "Hail Mary" play.

An early appearance of the term was in an Associated Press story about the upcoming 1941 Orange Bowl between the Mississippi State Bulldogs and the Georgetown Hoyas. The piece appeared in several newspapers including the December 31, 1940, Daytona Beach Morning Journal under the headline, "Orange Bowl: [Georgetown] Hoyas Put Faith in 'Hail Mary' Pass". As the article explained, "A 'hail Mary' pass, in the talk of the Washington eleven, is one that is thrown with a prayer because the odds against completion are big." During an NBC broadcast in 1963, Staubach, then a Navy quarterback, described a pass play during his team's victory over Michigan that year as a "Hail Mary play". He scrambled to escape a pass rush, nearly getting sacked 20 yards behind the line of scrimmage before completing a desperation pass for a one-yard gain.

== Examples ==
Arguably the most memorable and replayed Hail Mary walk-off touchdown pass came on November 23, 1984, in a game now known as "Hail Flutie". Boston College was trailing Miami (FL) 45–41 with six seconds left, when their quarterback Doug Flutie threw a 63-yard touchdown pass to Gerard Phelan, succeeding primarily because Miami's secondary stood on the goal line to keep the receivers in front of them without covering a post route behind them.

Miami's defense was based on the assumption that the five-foot-nine-inch Flutie could not throw the ball as far as the end zone: instead, Flutie hit Phelan in stride against a flatfooted defense a yard deep in the end zone as time expired. To commemorate the play, a statue of Flutie in his Hail Mary passing pose was unveiled outside Alumni Stadium at Boston College on November 7, 2008.

Other noteworthy examples include:

- December 19, 1980: Known as "The Miracle Bowl", Brigham Young University (BYU) quarterback Jim McMahon threw a 41-yard touchdown pass to tight end Clay Brown to defeat Southern Methodist University in the 1980 Holiday Bowl 46–45, which completed Brigham Young's comeback from a 45–25 deficit with four minutes remaining.
- November 20, 1983: In a Week 12 matchup featuring the San Francisco 49ers vs the Atlanta Falcons, Falcon's quarterback Steve Bartkowski threw a 47-yard touchdown pass to Billy "White Shoes" Johnson with no time left on the clock to win, 28–24. Johnson caught the ball at the six yard line, ran to his right and was tackled into the endzone by three 49er defenders.
- September 24, 1994: Known as the "Miracle at Michigan", Colorado quarterback Kordell Stewart threw a 64-yard walk-off touchdown pass to wide receiver Michael Westbrook to beat Michigan 27–26. Stewart's pass had traveled 73 yards in the air from the Colorado 26 to the opposite 1-yard line, was tipped by Blake Anderson, then caught by Westbrook four yards deep in the end zone.
- October 31, 1999: The Cleveland Browns' first win after returning as an expansion team came on a Hail Mary walk-off touchdown against the New Orleans Saints, when Browns quarterback Tim Couch avoided the Saints pass rush and launched a 56-yard pass that was tipped up in the air and caught by receiver Kevin Johnson near the pylon for a 21–16 Browns victory.
- November 9, 2002: Known as the "Bluegrass Miracle", Louisiana State University quarterback Marcus Randall threw a 74-yard touchdown pass to wide receiver Devery Henderson in the game to defeat Kentucky 33–30.
- December 8, 2002: Three years after his first Hail Mary, Tim Couch won another game with a game-ender against the Jacksonville Jaguars. Couch launched a 50-yard Hail Mary that was caught by Quincy Morgan, and the ensuing extra point gave the Browns a 21–20 win. Although he remains a hotly debated player - due to being picked #1 overall in the 1999 NFL draft and his injury-plagued career - Tim Couch remains the only NFL player to win two games on game-ending Hail Marys.
- October 22, 2011: Known as "Rocket", Michigan State quarterback Kirk Cousins threw a 44-yard touchdown pass to wide receiver Keith Nichol to beat Wisconsin 37–31.
- November 16, 2013: Known as the "Prayer at Jordan-Hare", Auburn quarterback Nick Marshall threw a 73-yard touchdown pass to wide receiver Ricardo Louis on fourth-and-18 with 36 seconds left to beat Georgia 43–38. Louis caught the ball after one Georgia defender tipped it away from another.
- November 10, 2013: With the Baltimore Ravens leading 17–10 on the last play of their game against the Cincinnati Bengals, Bengals quarterback Andy Dalton launched a 51-yard Hail Mary to the end zone, where a Ravens player tipped the ball in the air directly to A. J. Green for a touchdown. Despite this game-tying score, the Ravens won the game in overtime, 20–17.
- September 20, 2014: Arizona scored 36 points in the fourth quarter alone, overcoming a 45–30 deficit with just over five minutes remaining. After a missed Cal field goal, Arizona got the ball back at its own 29-yard line with 52 seconds left. Solomon completed a few quick passes, spiked the ball to stop the clock, and launched the final 47-yard prayer. Wide receiver Austin Hill caught the deflected or floating pass in the back of the end zone as time expired.
- September 5, 2015: Known as the "Miracle at Memorial", BYU quarterback Tanner Mangum threw a desperate 42-yard pass to wide receiver Mitch Mathews as time expired to defeat Nebraska 33–28 at Memorial Stadium, and break a streak of 29 consecutive home opener victories for the Cornhuskers. Mangum, a freshman just two months removed from a mission for the Church of Jesus Christ of Latter-day Saints, was the backup to senior Taysom Hill, who had left the game earlier with a season-ending Lisfranc injury, and was playing in his first organized football game in nearly four years.
- December 3, 2015: Known as the "Miracle in Motown", a 15-yard defensive facemask penalty on the Detroit Lions as time expired gave the Green Bay Packers, who had been trailing the entire game, an additional untimed down. Green Bay quarterback Aaron Rodgers threw a 61-yard touchdown pass which left his hand at Green Bay's 35-yard line and was caught four yards into the end zone by tight end Richard Rodgers to give the Packers a 27–23 win. The total distance of 69 yards is the longest Hail Mary pass in NFL history.
- January 16, 2016: In the postseason after the Miracle in Motown, Aaron Rodgers completed a second Hail Mary pass: faced with a 4th and 20 on his own 4-yard line and a 20–13 deficit against the Arizona Cardinals in the final minute of the game, Rodgers threw a 60-yard completion to Jeff Janis. On the final play of regulation, he completed a 41-yard touchdown pass to Janis, making Green Bay the first postseason team ever to score a game-tying touchdown on the final play of the 4th quarter. Despite this, Arizona won the game in overtime largely through the efforts of Larry Fitzgerald, who went all the way to the Green Bay 5-yard line on a short pass he caught while wide open before scoring two plays afterwards.
- September 10, 2016: After Oklahoma State football quarterback Mason Rudolph threw the ball up into the air as time expired, it was ruled intentional grounding: under college football rules, the game should have ended and Oklahoma State should have defeated Central Michigan 27–24. However, both on-field officials (from Central Michigan's home of the Mid-American Conference) and replay officials (from Oklahoma State's home of the Big 12 Conference) missed the call and gave Central Michigan an untimed down. CMU quarterback Cooper Rush threw a 49-yard Hail Mary to receiver Jesse Kroll, who then lateraled to Malik Fountain, who ran it into the end zone to win the game 30–27.
- October 1, 2016: After a 47-yard touchdown pass with ten seconds remaining on the clock, a Georgia player took off his helmet during the celebration, resulting in a 15-yard unsportsmanlike conduct penalty. The kickoff was returned to the Georgia 43-yard line: on the final play, Tennessee QB Joshua Dobbs threw a game-winning touchdown, caught by Jauan Jennings, as time expired to win 34–31.
- January 8, 2017: In a wildcard playoff game between the Green Bay Packers and the New York Giants, Aaron Rodgers completed a 42-yard pass to Randall Cobb over a crowd of players from both teams on the last play before halftime. This gave Green Bay a 14–6 halftime lead, and they went on to win 38–13.
- September 16, 2017: In a key Southeastern Conference matchup between the Florida Gators and the Tennessee Volunteers, Florida quarterback Feleipe Franks completed a 63-yard pass to Tyrie Cleveland as time expired to give UF a 26–20 win.
- November 15, 2020: In a week 10 game against the Buffalo Bills, Kyler Murray completed a 43-yard touchdown pass to receiver DeAndre Hopkins in the final seconds of the game. Hopkins caught the ball over three Bills defenders for a touchdown to win the game 32–30.
- September 17, 2022: During a College GameDay between Appalachian State and Troy, Appalachian State quarterback, Chase Brice, threw a 63-yard pass as time expired to Christan Horn who caught the pass for a touchdown, allowing Appalachian State to win, 32–28.
- September 17, 2023: In the dwindling seconds of a Week 2 matchup between the Washington Commanders and Denver Broncos, Broncos quarterback Russell Wilson completed a 50-yard touchdown pass to receiver Brandon Johnson to bring the game within a conversion, 35–33. Despite the incredible catch, which came off of multiple Commanders players deflecting the ball, the Broncos failed to complete the subsequent two-point conversion.
- October 14, 2024: In a Week 6 Monday night game between the Buffalo Bills and New York Jets, Aaron Rodgers threw a 52-yard deep pass to Allen Lazard into the end zone, crowded around the Bills defense on the last play before halftime. It was initially ruled as an incomplete pass, however, with the assistance of replay assist, the ruling was changed to a touchdown. The score after the PAT was 20-17 going into halftime. Despite this, Buffalo won the game 23–20.
- October 27, 2024: Known as the "Hail Maryland", Washington quarterback Jayden Daniels threw a deep middle pass for 52 yards to receiver Noah Brown for a walk-off Commanders touchdown to beat Chicago 18–15. According to NextGen Stats, Daniels scrambled for 12.79 seconds to make the play possible, the longest since the statistic was begun in 2016. His pass of 64 yards in the air is the second-longest successful NFL Hail Mary behind Aaron Rodgers's 69-yarder in the 2015 "Miracle in Motown."
- September 5, 2026: Known as the "Bail Mary", after one second was added to the game clock, Michigan quarterback Bryce Underwood threw a 47-yard desperation pass that was caught in the end zone by JJ Buchanan as the Wolverines avoided the upset, winning 13–12 over Western Michigan. The extra second proved to be controversial, as the previous Hail Mary attempt was knocked away by Western Michigan safety Micah Davis in the back of the end zone, presumably ending the game. According to the replay provided by NBC (which televised the game), the broadcast's own digital game clock as well as their synced recording of the Michigan Stadium game clock showed time had expired about a fraction of a second before Davis, who was out of bounds, jumped to make contact with the ball. However, the Big Ten's replay center showed otherwise, as Davis touched the ball with one second remaining.

== Metaphorical usage in other fields ==
The term "Hail Mary" is sometimes used to refer to any last-ditch effort with little chance of success.

In military uses, General Norman Schwarzkopf described his strategy during the Persian Gulf War to bypass the bulk of Iraqi forces in Kuwait by attacking in a wide left sweep through their rear as a "Hail Mary" plan. This usage, however, did not refer to the plan's chances of success but to the movement of Coalition forces to the left side of the front lines prior to the attack, which reflected the formation for a Hail Mary pass in which all the offensive team's wide receivers line up on one side of the line of scrimmage.

Various legal actions attempting to overturn Donald Trump's defeat in the 2020 U.S. presidential election, in particular the Texas v. Pennsylvania Supreme Court lawsuit, were described as "Hail Marys".

There are similar usages in other fields, such as a "Hail Mary shot" in photography where a photographer holds the view finder of an SLR camera away from the eyes (so unable to compose the picture), usually high above the head, and takes a shot. This is often used in crowded situations.

In computer security, a "Hail Mary attack" will throw every exploit it has against a system to see whether any of them work.

When the Pennsylvania Republican Party sold its headquarters in Harrisburg to the Catholic Church, this was described by The New York Times as "a real-life Hail Mary".

After the Russian invasion of Ukraine in February 2022, Pope Francis' attempts to stop the conflict by consecrating Russia and Ukraine to the Immaculate Heart of Mary was called the "Pope's Hail Mary pass".

At the end of the NASCAR Cup Series' 2022 Xfinity 500 at Martinsville Speedway, Ross Chastain's wall-ride move to get the positions he needed to clinch a spot in the Championship 4 was given the name "Hail Melon", combining the name of the football pass play with Chastain's association with watermelons.

The term "Hail Mary" was also the namesake of Project Hail Mary, both the 2021 novel and the 2026 film adaptation. Both plots surround a last-ditch effort to save the Earth from a organism that eats the Sun's energy.

== See also ==
- Lateral pass, another football strategy that is similar in that it is generally only used in desperation by the losing team on the very last play
- Fail Mary
- Gambit
- List of Hail Mary passes in American football
- List of sports idioms
- 1975–76 NFL playoffs
- Aaron Rodgers
- Lions–Packers rivalry
- Cowboys–Vikings rivalry
- Buzzer beater, similar application in basketball
- Kicks after the siren in Australian rules football
