= Cowboys–Vikings rivalry =

National Football League rivalry

- Dallas Cowboys Minnesota Vikings
- Location: Dallas, Minneapolis
- First meeting: September 24, 1961; Cowboys 21, Vikings 7
- Latest meeting: December 14, 2025; Vikings 34, Cowboys 26
- Next meeting: TBD (no later than 2028 regular season)
- Stadiums: Cowboys: AT&T Stadium; Vikings: U.S. Bank Stadium

Statistics
- Total meetings: 35
- All-time series: Cowboys: 19–16
- Regular season series: Cowboys: 15–13
- Postseason results: Cowboys: 4–3
- Largest victory: Cowboys: 40–3 (2022); Vikings: 54–13 (1970)
- Most points scored: Cowboys: 40 (1996), (2022); Vikings: 54 (1970)
- Longest win streak: Cowboys: 4 (1961–1968); Vikings: 5 (1998–2004)
- Current win streak: Vikings: 1 (2025–present)

Post–season history
- 1971 NFC Divisional: Cowboys won: 20–12; 1973 NFC Championship: Vikings won: 27–10; 1975 NFC Divisional: Cowboys won: 17–14; 1977 NFC Championship: Cowboys won: 23–6; 1996 NFC Wild Card: Cowboys won: 40–15; 1999 NFC Wild Card: Vikings won: 27–10; 2009 NFC Divisional: Vikings won: 34–3

The Cowboys–Vikings rivalry is a National Football League (NFL) rivalry between the Dallas Cowboys and Minnesota Vikings. The Cowboys and Vikings have played seven times in the playoffs, making this one of the most played playoff series in league history (the Vikings' most common playoff opponent and the fourth-most for the Cowboys after the 49ers, Rams, and Packers). CBS Sports named the rivalry among the best in the 1970s.

The Cowboys lead the overall series, 19–16. The two teams have met seven times in the playoffs, with the Cowboys holding a 4–3 record.

== Meetings ==
- In 1975, the Dallas Cowboys traveled to the Twin Cities for a Divisional playoff game. The Vikings looked to have the game wrapped-up with a late lead 14–10. However, Roger Staubach threw a 50-yard touchdown pass to Drew Pearson in what became known as the Hail Mary game.
- In January 1983, future Hall of Fame running back Tony Dorsett rushed for an NFL-record 99-yard touchdown in a Monday Night Football game in Minnesota. This occurred despite the Cowboys have only 10 players in the game, as fullback Ron Springs was on the sidelines. The Vikings won the game.
- In 1989, the Minnesota Vikings and Dallas Cowboys were part of the Herschel Walker trade, the largest player trade in NFL history. In this trade, the Vikings received Herschel Walker and three picks from the Cowboys in exchange for eight picks given to the Cowboys. The Vikings felt it was the last piece needed to make a Super Bowl run. Instead, the trade catapulted the Cowboys to three Super Bowl wins in the 1990s; the Vikings won none with Walker. It is thus considered one of the worst trades in NFL history.
- The 1996 NFC Wild Card Round saw the defending Super Bowl champion Cowboys defeat the Vikings 40–15.
- In 1998, the Minnesota Vikings played the Dallas Cowboys on Thanksgiving. Randy Moss, a rookie wide receiver who the Cowboys had passed over due to legal issues in college, famously had three touchdowns in a 46–36 thriller.
- In the 1999 playoffs, the Cowboys traveled to the Hubert H. Humphrey Metrodome for a key wild-card playoff game. The Vikings won 27–10.
- In the 2009 playoffs, Dallas traveled to the Metrodome for the NFC Divisional playoff game with the Minnesota Vikings. The Vikings defeated the Cowboys 34–3. Late in the game, Cowboys player Keith Brooking was seen arguing with Vikings coaches because he believed the Vikings were running up the score. Cowboys head coach Wade Phillips also believed Minnesota's late-game aggression was uncalled for.
- In 2022, the Cowboys travelled to U.S. Bank Stadium and blew out the Vikings 40–3. Minnesota quarterback Kirk Cousins was sacked a career-high seven times, and this was the largest road win in Dallas Cowboys' history. The game was so lopsided that CBS Sports switched to a "more competitive" game, this being the Bengals–Steelers, for their national broadcast with five minutes left in the third quarter.

== Season-by-season results ==
Dallas Cowboys vs. Minnesota Vikings season-by-season results
1960s (Cowboys, 4–0)

Season	Results	Location	Overall series	Notes
1961	Cowboys; 21–7	Cotton Bowl	Cowboys; 1–0	Vikings join the National Football League (NFL) as an expansion team. Cowboys' win in Minnesota was the franchise's first road win.
1961	Cowboys; 28–0	Metropolitan Stadium	Cowboys; 2–0	Vikings join the National Football League (NFL) as an expansion team. Cowboys' win in Minnesota was the franchise's first road win.
1966	Cowboys; 28–17	Cotton Bowl	Cowboys; 3–0	
1968	Cowboys; 20–7	Cotton Bowl	Cowboys; 4–0	Final meeting at Cotton Bowl.

1970s (Cowboys, 5–4)

Season	Results	Location	Overall series	Notes
1970	Vikings; 54–13	Metropolitan Stadium	Cowboys; 4–1	First start in the series for Roger Staubach. Vikings record their largest victory against the Cowboys with a 41–point differential and score their most points in a game against the Cowboys.
1971 playoffs	Cowboys 20–12	Metropolitan Stadium	Cowboys 5–1	NFC Divisional Round. Game was played on Christmas Day. Cowboys win Super Bowl VI.
1973 playoffs	Vikings 27–10	Texas Stadium	Cowboys 5–2	NFC Championship Game. First meeting at Texas Stadium. Vikings lose Super Bowl VIII.
1974	Vikings; 23–21	Texas Stadium	Cowboys; 5–3	Vikings lose Super Bowl IX.
1975 playoffs	Cowboys 17–14	Metropolitan Stadium	Cowboys 6–3	NFC Divisional Round. Known as the (Hail Mary Game) due to Roger Staubach's post-game comments. Cowboys lose Super Bowl X.
1977	Cowboys; 16–10(OT)	Metropolitan Stadium	Cowboys; 7–3	
1977 playoffs	Cowboys 23–6	Texas Stadium	Cowboys 8–3	NFC Championship Game. Cowboys win Super Bowl XII.
1978	Vikings; 21–10	Texas Stadium	Cowboys; 8–4	Vikings' win was the Cowboys' only home loss in the 1978 season. Cowboys lose Super Bowl XIII.
1979	Cowboys; 36–20	Metropolitan Stadium	Cowboys; 9–4	Final meeting at Metropolitan Stadium. Final start in the series for Roger Staubach.

1980s (Vikings, 3–1)

Season	Results	Location	Overall series	Notes
1982	Vikings; 31–27	Metrodome	Cowboys; 9–5	First meeting at Metrodome.
1983	Cowboys; 37–24	Metrodome	Cowboys; 10–5	
1987	Vikings; 44–38 (OT)	Texas Stadium	Cowboys; 10–6	Game was played on Thanksgiving.
1988	Vikings; 43–3	Texas Stadium	Cowboys; 10–7	

1990s (Tied, 3–3)

Season	Results	Location	Overall series	Notes
1993	Cowboys; 37–20	Metrodome	Cowboys; 11–7	First start in series for Troy Aikman. Cowboys win Super Bowl XXVIII.
1995	Cowboys; 23–17(OT)	Metrodome	Cowboys; 12–7	Cowboys win Super Bowl XXX.
1996 playoffs	Cowboys 40–15	Texas Stadium	Cowboys 13–7	NFC Wild Card Round. Cowboys score their most points in a game against the Vikings.
1998	Vikings; 46–36	Texas Stadium	Cowboys; 13–8	Game was played on Thanksgiving. Vikings WR Randy Moss famously finishes with 163 yards and 3 touchdowns on 3 receptions.
1999	Vikings; 27–17	Metrodome	Cowboys; 13–9	
1999 playoffs	Vikings 27–10	Metrodome	Cowboys 13–10	NFC Wild Card Round.

2000s (Vikings, 3–1)

Season	Results	Location	Overall series	Notes
2000	Vikings; 27–15	Texas Stadium	Cowboys; 13–11	Game was played on Thanksgiving. After their road win against the Cowboys, the Vikings went on a 17-game road losing streak. Last start in the series for Troy Aikman.
2004	Vikings; 35–17	Metrodome	Cowboys; 13–12	
2007	Cowboys; 24–14	Texas Stadium	Cowboys; 14–12	Final meeting at Texas Stadium.
2009 playoffs	Vikings 34–3	Metrodome	Cowboys 14–13	NFC Divisional Round. Final playoff win in Brett Favre's career, as well as his only win against the Cowboys in the playoffs.

2010s (Tied, 2–2)

Season	Results	Location	Overall series	Notes
2010	Vikings; 24–21	Metrodome	Tie; 14–14	Final meeting at Metrodome.
2013	Cowboys; 27–23	AT&T Stadium	Cowboys; 15–14	First meeting at AT&T Stadium.
2016	Cowboys; 17–15	U.S. Bank Stadium	Cowboys; 16–14	First meeting at U.S. Bank Stadium.
2019	Vikings; 28–24	AT&T Stadium	Cowboys; 16–15	

2020s (Cowboys, 3–1)

Season	Results	Location	Overall series	Notes
2020	Cowboys; 31–28	U.S. Bank Stadium	Cowboys; 17–15	
2021	Cowboys; 20–16	U.S. Bank Stadium	Cowboys; 18–15	
2022	Cowboys; 40–3	U.S. Bank Stadium	Cowboys; 19–15	Cowboys record their largest victory against the Vikings with a 37–point differential and tied their most points scored in a game against the Vikings (1996).
2025	Vikings; 34–26	AT&T Stadium	Cowboys; 19–16	Road team has won six straight meetings.

Summary of results

Season	Season series	at Dallas Cowboys	at Minnesota Vikings	Notes
Regular season	Cowboys 15–13	Vikings 8–5	Cowboys 10–5	
Postseason	Cowboys 4–3	Cowboys 2–1	Tie 2–2	NFC Wild Card: 1996, 1999; NFC Divisional: 1971, 1975, 2009; NFC Championship: 1973, 1977
Regular and postseason	Cowboys 19–16	Vikings 9–7	Cowboys 12–7	

== See also ==
- List of NFL rivalries
- Hail Mary Pass
- Herschel Walker trade
