= List of Hillsdale Chargers head football coaches =

The Hillsdale Chargers football program represents Hillsdale College in college football as a member of the Great Midwest Athletic Conference (G-MAC), at the NCAA Division II level. The team has had 29 head coaches (not counting "student coaches") since its first recorded football game in 1891. The current head coach is Nate Shreffler, who took the position prior to the 2024 season.

== Key ==
Key to symbols in coaches list
| General | | Overall | | Conference | | Postseason (Note: Although the first Rose Bowl Game was played in 1902, it has been continuously played since the 1916 game, and is recognized as the oldest bowl game by the NCAA. "—" indicates any season prior to 1916 when postseason games were not played.) | |
|---|---|---|---|---|---|---|---|
| No. | Order of coaches (Note: A running total of the number of head coaches, with coaches who served separate tenures being counted only once. Interim head coaches are represented with "Int" and are not counted in the running total. "—" indicates the team played but either without a coach or no coach is on record. "X" indicates an interim year without play.) | GC | Games coached | CW | Conference wins | PW | Postseason wins |
| DC | Division championships | OW | Overall wins | CL | Conference losses | PL | Postseason losses |
| CC | Conference championships | OL | Overall losses | CT | Conference ties | PT | Postseason ties |
| NC | National championships | OT | Overall ties (Note: Overtime rules in college football were introduced in 1996, making ties impossible in the period since.) | C% | Conference winning percentage | | |
| † | Elected to the College Football Hall of Fame | O% | Overall winning percentage (Note: When computing the win–loss percentage, a tie counts as half a win and half a loss.) | | | | |

== Coaches ==
| No. | Name | Term | GC | OW | OL | OT | O% | CW | CL | CT | C% | PW | PL | CCs | Awards |
|---|---|---|---|---|---|---|---|---|---|---|---|---|---|---|---|
| 0 | No coach | 1891–1895 | 18 | 10 | 7 | 1 | .583 | — | — | — | — | — | — | — | — |
| 1 | Duncan M. Martin | 1896, 1898 | 9 | 6 | 5 | 0 | .545 | 2 | 0 | 0 | 1.000 | — | — | — | — |
| 2 | Ignatius M. Duffy | 1897 | 3 | 1 | 1 | 1 | .500 | — | — | — | — | — | — | — | — |
| 0 | No coach | 1899–1903 | 28 | 9 | 19 | 0 | .321 | — | — | — | — | — | — | — | — |
| 3 | Harry McRae | 1904 | 7 | 0 | 7 | 0 | .000 | — | — | — | — | — | — | — | — |
| 0 | No coach | 1905 | 10 | 5 | 5 | 0 | .500 | — | — | — | — | — | — | — | — |
| 4 | William Boone | 1906 | 7 | 0 | 7 | 0 | .000 | — | — | — | — | — | — | — | — |
| 5 | James Whipple | 1907 | 6 | 4 | 2 | 0 | .667 | — | — | — | — | — | — | — | — |
| 6 | Herbert C. Reed | 1908–1910 | 21 | 7 | 9 | 5 | .452 | — | — | — | — | — | — | — | — |
| 7 | Claude J. Hunt | 1911–1912 | 12 | 8 | 3 | 1 | .708 | — | — | — | — | — | — | — | — |
| 8 | Charles Firth | 1913 | 6 | 2 | 3 | 1 | .417 | — | — | — | — | — | — | — | — |
| 9 | Leroy Buchiet | 1914–1917 | 27 | 10 | 14 | 3 | .426 | — | — | — | — | — | — | — | — |
| 10 | Lawrence Manson | 1918 | 6 | 1 | 5 | 0 | .167 | — | — | — | — | — | — | — | — |
| 11 | Samuel Taylor | 1919 | 7 | 3 | 4 | 0 | .429 | — | — | — | — | — | — | — | — |
| 12 | William J. Rennie | 1920–1921 | 17 | 12 | 4 | 1 | .735 | — | — | — | — | — | — | — | — |
| 13 | Louis Ost | 1922 | 8 | 3 | 5 | 0 | .375 | — | — | — | — | — | — | — | — |
| 14 | Howard B. Jefferson | 1923–1924 | 15 | 9 | 4 | 2 | .667 | — | — | — | — | — | — | — | — |
| 15 | Elroy Guckert | 1925–1926 | 16 | 9 | 5 | 2 | .625 | — | — | — | — | — | — | — | — |
| 16 | Dwight Harwood | 1927–1945 | 135 | 69 | 52 | 14 | .563 | — | — | — | — | — | — | — | — |
| 17 | David M. Nelson^{†} | 1946–1947 | 17 | 14 | 1 | 2 | .882 | — | — | — | — | — | — | — | — |
| 18 | Gib Holgate | 1948 | 9 | 6 | 2 | 1 | .722 | — | — | — | — | — | — | — | — |
| 19 | Jack Petoskey | 1949–1950 | 19 | 11 | 7 | 1 | .605 | — | — | — | — | — | — | — | — |
| 20 | Irv Wisniewski | 1951 | 8 | 2 | 6 | 0 | .250 | — | — | — | — | — | — | — | — |
| 21 | Henry Fallon | 1952 | 8 | 3 | 5 | 0 | .375 | — | — | — | — | — | — | — | — |
| 22 | Charlie Bachman^{†} | 1953 | 10 | 5 | 3 | 2 | .600 | — | — | — | — | — | — | — | — |
| 23 | Muddy Waters^{†} | 1954–1973 | 190 | 138 | 47 | 5 | .739 | — | — | — | — | — | — | — | — |
| 24 | Jack McAvoy | 1974–1977 | 41 | 24 | 16 | 1 | .598 | — | — | — | — | — | — | — | — |
| 25 | Ron Lynch | 1978–1979 | 22 | 8 | 14 | 0 | .364 | — | — | — | — | — | — | — | — |
| 26 | Dick Lowry | 1980–1996 | 188 | 134 | 52 | 2 | .718 | — | — | — | — | — | — | — | — |
| 27 | Dave Dye | 1997–2001 | 55 | 21 | 34 | 0 | .382 | — | — | — | — | — | — | — | — |
| 28 | Keith Otterbein | 2002–2023 | 240 | 132 | 108 | 0 | .550 | 116 | 82 | 0 | .586 | 2 | 4 | 2 | — |
| 29 | Nate Shreffler | 2024–present | 23 | 12 | 11 | 0 | .522 | 11 | 7 | 0 | .611 | — | — | — | — |
