= Hillsdale Chargers football, 2010–2019 =

American college football season

2010–2019 Hillsdale Chargers football
- Conference: Great Lakes Intercollegiate Athletic Conference
- Head coach: Keith Otterbein (2002–2023)
- Home stadium: Frank "Muddy" Waters Stadium

The Hillsale Chargers football program, 2010–2019 represented Hillsdale College during the 2010s in NCAA Division II college football. They were a member of the Great Lakes Intercollegiate Athletic Conference (GLIAC) from 2010 to 2016 and the Great Midwest Athletic Conference (G-MAC) from 2017 to 2019. The team was led by head coach Keith Otterbein who held the post for 22 years from 2002 to 2023. Highlights of the decade included:

- The 2010 Hillsdale Chargers football team compiled a 9–3 record, tied for the GLIAC North Division championship, and advanced to the NCAA Division II playoffs.
- The 2011 Hillsdale Chargers football team compiled an 8–3 record, won the GLIAC championship. Running back Joe Glendening rushed for 1,604 yards, was selected as the GLIAC player of the year and was a finalist for the Harlon Hill Trophy.
- The 2012 Hillsdale Chargers football team compiled a 7–4 record and tied for the GLIAC North co-championship.
- In 2017, Hillsdale left the GLIAC and joined the G-MAC.
- The 2018 Hillsdale Chargers football team compiled a 10–3 record, won the G-MAC championship, and advanced to the second round of the NCAA Division II playoffs.

The team played its home games at Frank "Muddy" Waters Stadium in Hillsdale, Michigan.

== 2010 ==
2010 Hillsdale Chargers football

NCAA Division II first round, L 28-42 vs. St. Cloud State
- Conference: Great Lakes Intercollegiate Athletic Conference
- South Division
- Record: 9–3 (8–2 GLIAC)
- Head coach: Keith Otterbein (9th season)
- Offensive coordinator: Nate Shreffler (1st season)
- Home stadium: Frank "Muddy" Waters Stadium

2010 Great Lakes Intercollegiate Athletic Conference football standings
	Conf.			Overall
Team	W		L	W		L
North
No. 10 Grand Valley State $^	9	–	1	11	–	2
No. 25 Michigan Tech	8	–	2	8	–	2
Indianapolis	5	–	5	6	–	5
Ferris State	5	–	5	5	–	6
Northern Michigan	5	–	5	5	–	6
Northwood	5	–	5	5	–	6
Saginaw Valley State	4	–	6	4	–	7
South
No. 21 Wayne State (MI)	8	–	2	9	–	2
No. 16 Hillsdale ^	8	–	2	9	–	3
Ashland	7	–	3	8	–	3
Lake Erie	3	–	7	3	–	8
Ohio Dominican *	2	–	8	2	–	8
Findlay	1	–	9	1	–	10
Tiffin	0	–	10	1	–	10
$ – Conference champion; ^ – NCAA Division II playoff participant; * – Provisional Division II member; Rankings from AFCA poll

The 2010 Hillsdale Chargers football team represented Hillsdale College as a member of the Great Lakes Intercollegiate Athletic Conference (GLIAC) during the 2010 NCAA Division II football season. In their ninth year under head coach Keith Otterbein, the Chargers compiled a 9–3 record (8–2 in conference games), tied for the GLIAC North Division championship, and outscored opponents by a total of 304 to 188. They advanced to the Division II playoffs, losing to St. Cloud State in the first round.

In a pre-season coaches poll, Hillsdale was picked to finish second in the conference. The return of quarterback Troy Weatherhead wide receiver Andre Holmes, and defensive back Nick Hixson were cited as reasons for the high expectations.

Senior quarterback Troy Weatherhead completed 220 of 283 passes (77.74%) for 2,484 yards, 20 touchdowns, and four interceptions. His 171.59 efficiency rating was the best in the country, and he was named GLIAC player of the year for 2010. He left Hillsdale with the school's career records in passing yards (9,144) and touchdown passes (63).

Other key players included:

- Running back Joe Glendening gained 1,259 rushing yards on 276 carries for an average of 4.6 yards per carry. Glendening also led the team in scoring with 72 points on 12 touchdowns.
- Wide receiver Andre Holmes caught 82 passes for 1,095 yards.
- Kicker Colin McGreevy converted 40 of 40 extra points and six of ten field goals for a total of 58 points.
- Defensive back Nick Hixson led the team with 74 total tackles.
- David Baker led the team with 7.5 tackles for loss and three sacks.

=== Schedule ===
Date	Opponent	Rank	Site	Result	Attendance	Source
September 3	Ferris State*	No. 16	Muddy Waters Stadium; Hillsdale, MI	W 35–17	2,977	
September 11	at No. 1 Grand Valley State	No. 11	Lubbers Stadium; Allendale, MI	L 41–44	11,637	
September 18	at Ashland	No. 13	Jack Miller Stadium; Ashland, OH	W 27–17	4,874	
September 25	Lake Erie	No. 12	Muddy Waters Stadium; Hillsdale, MI	W 42–37	1,312	
October 2	Saginaw Valley State	No. 11	Muddy Waters Stadium; Hillsdale, MI	W 35–21	1,279	
October 9	at Ohio Dominican	No. 9	Panther Field; Columbus, OH	W 35–10	1,587	
October 16	Michigan Tech	No. 8	Muddy Waters Stadium; Hillsdale, MI	W 24–17	2,117	
October 23	at Wayne State	No. 6	Tom Adams Field; Detroit, MI	L 9–14	2,720	
October 30	at Northwood	No. 17	Hantz Stadium; Midland, MI	W 35–28	1,573	
November 6	Findlay	No. 17	Muddy Waters Stadium; Hillsdale, MI	W 31–3	2,229	
November 14	Tiffin	No. 13	Muddy Waters Stadium; Hillsdale, MI	W 31–24	903	
November 20	at No. 15 St. Cloud State*	No. 10	Husky Stadium; St. Cloud, MN (NCAA Division II first round)	L 28–42	1,064	
*Non-conference game; Rankings from Coaches' Poll released prior to the game

== 2011 ==
2011 Hillsdale Chargers football

GLIAC champion
- Conference: Great Lakes Intercollegiate Athletic Conference
- South Division
- Record: 8–3 (8–2 GLIAC)
- Head coach: Keith Otterbein (10th season)
- Offensive coordinator: Nate Shreffler (2nd season)
- Home stadium: Frank "Muddy" Waters Stadium

2011 Great Lakes Intercollegiate Athletic Conference football standings
	Conf.			Overall
Team	W		L	W		L
North
Grand Valley State	7	–	3	8	–	3
Saginaw Valley State ^	7	–	3	7	–	4
Indianapolis	6	–	4	7	–	4
Michigan Tech	6	–	4	7	–	4
Ferris State	5	–	5	6	–	5
Northern Michigan	3	–	7	4	–	7
Northwood	1	–	9	2	–	9
South
Hillsdale $	8	–	2	8	–	3
No. 2 Wayne State (MI) ^	7	–	3	12	–	4
Ohio Dominican	6	–	4	7	–	4
Ashland	6	–	4	6	–	5
Findlay	6	–	4	6	–	5
Lake Erie	2	–	8	3	–	8
Tiffin	0	–	10	0	–	11
$ – Conference champion; ^ – NCAA Division II playoff participant; Rankings from AFCA poll

The 2011 Hillsdale Chargers football team represented Hillsdale College as a member of the Great Lakes Intercollegiate Athletic Conference (GLIAC) during the 2011 NCAA Division II football season. In their tenth year under head coach Keith Otterbein, the Chargers compiled a 8–3 record (8–2 in conference games), won the GLIAC championship, and outscored opponents by a total of 331 to 232. Despite winning the GLIAC championship, Hillsdale was not invited to play in the Division II playoffs; two other GLIAC teams who finished below Hillsdale in the standings (Wayne State and Saginaw Valley State) were invited.

Despite missing one game and part of another after suffering a concussion, running back Joe Glendening, nicknamed "Joe the Show", set Hillsdale's single-season records with 1,604 rushing yards, 27 rushing touchdowns, and 325 rushing attempts. He also led the team in scoring with 180 points on 30 total touchdowns. Glendening received Division II All-America honors, was a finalist for the Harlon Hill Trophy, and was selected as the GLIAC player of the year for 2011.

Other key players included:

- Quarterback Anthony Misfud completed 190 of 288 passes (65.97%) for 2,363 yards, 15 touchdowns, five interceptions, and a 148.61 efficiency rating.
- Andrew Mott had 39 pass receptions for 587 yards.

=== Schedule ===
Date	Opponent	Site	Result	Attendance	Source
September 2	at Ferris State	Top Taggart Field; Big Rapids, MI	L 17–20	3,453	
September 10	Grand Valley State	Muddy Waters Stadium; Hillsdale, MI	W 34–31	2,887	
September 17	Ashland	Muddy Waters Stadium; Hillsdale, MI	W 40–34 ^{3OT}	1,738	
September 24	at Lake Erie	Jack Britt Memorial Stadium; Painesville, OH	W 35–26	2,452	
October 1	at Saginaw Valley State	Wickes Stadium; Allendale, MI	W 38–35	6,984	
October 8	Ohio Dominican	Muddy Waters Stadium; Hillsdale, MI	L 42–43	2,663	
October 15	at Michigan Tech	Sherman Field; Houghton, MI	W 13–7	1,658	
October 22	No. 17 Wayne State (MI)	Muddy Waters Stadium; Hillsdale, MI	L 24–27 ^{2OT}	2,076	
October 29	Northwood	Muddy Waters Stadium; Hillsdale, MI	W 14–10	938	
November 5	at Findlay	Donnell Stadium; Findlay, OH	W 49–19	1,180	
November 12	at Tiffin	Frost-Kalnow Stadium; Tiffin, OH	W 42–0	702	
Rankings from AFCA Poll released prior to the game

== 2012 ==
2012 Hillsdale Chargers football
- Conference: Great Lakes Intercollegiate Athletic Conference
- North Division
- Record: 7–4 (7–3 GLIAC)
- Head coach: Keith Otterbein (11th season)
- Offensive coordinator: Nate Shreffler (3rd season)
- Home stadium: Frank "Muddy" Waters Stadium

2012 Great Lakes Intercollegiate Athletic Conference football standings
	Conf.			Overall
Team	W		L	W		L
North
Grand Valley State	7	–	3	8	–	3
Saginaw Valley State	7	–	3	8	–	3
Michigan Tech	7	–	3	7	–	3
Hillsdale	7	–	3	7	–	4
Ferris State	6	–	4	7	–	4
Wayne State (MI)	5	–	5	5	–	5
Northwood	4	–	6	5	–	6
Northern Michigan	4	–	6	5	–	6
South
No. 9 Ashland $^	10	–	0	11	–	1
Ohio Dominican	7	–	3	8	–	3
Findlay	7	–	3	7	–	3
Lake Erie	3	–	7	3	–	8
Notre Dame (OH)	2	–	8	3	–	8
Tiffin	2	–	8	3	–	8
Walsh *	2	–	8	3	–	8
Malone *	1	–	9	1	–	9
$ – Conference champion; ^ – NCAA Division II playoff participant; * – Provisional Division II member; Rankings from AFCA poll

The 2012 Hillsdale Chargers football team represented Hillsdale College as a member of the Great Lakes Intercollegiate Athletic Conference (GLIAC) during the 2012 NCAA Division II football season. In their 11th year under head coach Keith Otterbein, the Chargers compiled a 7–4 record (7–3 in conference games), finished in a four-way tie for the GLIAC North Division championship, and outscored opponents by a total of 330 to 228.

Other key players included:

- Running back Joe Glendening gained 1,517 rushing yards on 301 carries for an average of 5.0 yards per carry. He also led the team in scoring with 96 points on 16 touchdowns.
- Quarterback Anthony Mifsud completed 179 of 278 passes for 2,108 yards, 18 touchdowns, eight interceptions, and a 143.69 efficiency rating. He also ranked second on the team with 305 rushing yards.
- Andrew Mott was the team's leading receiver with 40 catches for 457 yards.

=== Schedule ===
Date	Time	Opponent	Rank	Site	Result	Attendance	Source
August 30	5:00 p.m.	at No. 11 California (PA)*	No. 17	Roadman Park; California, PA	L 22–30	4,236	
September 8	7:00 p.m.	Ohio Dominican	No. 25	Muddy Waters Stadium; Hillsdale, MI	W 38–20	2,317	
September 15	7:00 p.m.	Malone		Muddy Waters Stadium; Hillsdale, MI	W 27–10	1,566	
September 22	1:00 p.m.	at Notre Dame (OH)		Korb Field; Lyndhurst, OH	W 63–14	1,224	
September 29	1:30 p.m.	Northern Michigan		Muddy Waters Stadium; Hillsdale, MI	W 44–6	1,362	
October 6	12:00 p.m.	at No. 19 Wayne State (MI)		Tom Adams Field; Detroit, MI	L 21–24	3,219	
October 13	2:00 p.m.	at Ferris State		Top Taggart Field; Big Rapids, MI	W 30–20	2,973	
October 20	1:30 p.m.	No. 15 Saginaw Valley State		Muddy Waters Stadium; Hillsdale, MI	W 34–17	1,713	
October 27	2:30 p.m.	No. 23 Grand Valley State^{†}	No. 24	Muddy Waters Stadium; Hillsdale, MI	L 23–42	2,878	
November 3	1:00 p.m.	at Michigan Tech		Sherman Field; Houghton, MI	L 14–42	1,662	
November 10	12:00 p.m.	at Northwood		Hantz Stadium; Midland, MI	W 14–3	1,339	
*Non-conference game; ^{†}Homecoming; Rankings from AFCA Poll released prior to the game; All times are in Eastern time

== 2013 ==
2013 Hillsdale Chargers football
- Conference: Great Lakes Intercollegiate Athletic Conference
- North Division
- Record: 5–6 (5–4 GLIAC)
- Head coach: Keith Otterbein (12th season)
- Offensive coordinator: Nate Shreffler (4th season)
- Home stadium: Frank "Muddy" Waters Stadium

2013 Great Lakes Intercollegiate Athletic Conference football standings
	Conf.			Overall
Team	W		L	W		L
North
No. 22 Saginaw Valley State ^	9	–	1	9	–	3
Ferris State	8	–	2	8	–	3
No. 3 Grand Valley State ^	7	–	2	12	–	3
Michigan Tech	6	–	4	6	–	4
Hillsdale	5	–	4	5	–	6
Northern Michigan	3	–	7	3	–	7
Wayne State (MI)	3	–	7	3	–	8
Northwood	1	–	8	2	–	9
South
No. 12 Ohio Dominican $^	9	–	0	10	–	1
Findlay	6	–	3	8	–	3
Ashland	5	–	4	5	–	5
Lake Erie	3	–	6	4	–	7
Walsh	3	–	6	3	–	8
Malone	1	–	8	2	–	9
Tiffin	1	–	8	2	–	9
$ – Conference champion; ^ – NCAA Division II playoff participant; Rankings from AFCA poll

The 2013 Hillsdale Chargers football team represented Hillsdale College as a member of the Great Lakes Intercollegiate Athletic Conference (GLIAC) during the 2013 NCAA Division II football season. In their 12th year under head coach Keith Otterbein, the Chargers compiled a 5–6 record (5–4 in conference games), finished in fifth place in the GLIAC's North Division, and outscored opponents by a total of 307 to 271.

Key players included Sam Landry (2,514 passing yrards), Isaac Spence (388 rushing yards), Andrew Mott (390 receiving yards), and kicker Steven Mette (67 points scored).

=== Schedule ===
Date	Opponent	Site	Result	Attendance	Source
September 7	California (PA)*	Muddy Waters Stadium; Hillsdale, MI	L 19–22	2,518	
September 14	at Ohio Dominican	Panther Field; Columbus, OH	L 20–37	1,548	
September 21	at Malone	Fawcett Stadium; Canton, OH	W 41–16	1,000	
September 28	Indianapolis*	Muddy Waters Stadium; Hillsdale, MI	L 14–17	2,476	
October 5	at Northern Michigan	Superior Dome; Marquette, MI	W 27–17	1,704	
October 12	Wayne State (MI)	Muddy Waters Stadium; Hillsdale, MI	W 35–16	1,178	
October 19	Ferris State	Muddy Waters Stadium; Hillsdale, MI	W 45–38	1,303	
October 26	at No. 25 Saginaw Valley State	Wickes Stadium; University Center, Michigan	L 34–47	3,100	
November 2	at Grand Valley State	Lubbers Stadium; Allendale, MI	L 21–31	8,129	
November 9	Michigan Tech	Muddy Waters Stadium; Hillsdale, MI	W 27–23	1,007	
November 16	Northwood	Muddy Waters Stadium; Hillsdale, MI	W 24–7	1,045	
*Non-conference game; Rankings from AFCA Poll released prior to the game

== 2014 ==
2014 Hillsdale Chargers football
- Conference: Great Lakes Intercollegiate Athletic Conference
- Record: 4–7 (4–6 GLIAC)
- Head coach: Keith Otterbein (13th season)
- Offensive coordinator: Nate Shreffler (5th season)
- Home stadium: Frank "Muddy" Waters Stadium

2014 Great Lakes Intercollegiate Athletic Conference football standings
	Conf.			Overall
Team	W		L	W		L
No. 11 Ferris State $^	10	–	0	11	–	1
No. 4 Ohio Dominican ^	9	–	1	11	–	2
No. 21 Michigan Tech ^	9	–	1	9	–	2
Ashland	8	–	2	8	–	2
Wayne State (MI)	6	–	4	7	–	4
Grand Valley State	6	–	4	6	–	5
Findlay	4	–	6	5	–	6
Northwood	4	–	6	5	–	6
Tiffin	4	–	6	5	–	6
Hillsdale	4	–	6	4	–	7
Lake Erie	3	–	7	4	–	7
Walsh	3	–	7	4	–	7
Northern Michigan	2	–	8	3	–	8
Saginaw Valley State	2	–	8	2	–	9
Malone	1	–	9	1	–	10
$ – Conference champion; ^ – NCAA Division II playoff participant; Rankings from AFCA poll

The 2014 Hillsdale Chargers football team represented Hillsdale College as a member of the Great Lakes Intercollegiate Athletic Conference (GLIAC) during the 2014 NCAA Division II football season. In their 13th year under head coach Keith Otterbein, the Chargers compiled a 4–7 record (4–6 in conference games), finished in a four-way tie for seventh place in the GLIAC, and were outscored by a total of 271 to 234.

The team's statistical leaders included: Mark LaPrairie (1,990 passing yards); Bennett Lewis (598 rushing yards); John Haley (643 receiving yards); and kicker Steven Mette (66 points scored).

=== Schedule ===
Date	Opponent	Site	Result	Attendance	Source
September 6	at Findlay	Donnell Stadium; Findlay, OH	L 38–46	2,104	
September 13	at Lake Erie	Jack Britt Memorial Stadium; Painesville, OH	W 48–41	732	
September 20	Northern Michigan	Muddy Waters Stadium; Hillsdale, MI	W 13–10	2,017	
September 27	at Indianapolis	Key Stadium; Indianapolis, IN	L 19–24	9,236	
October 4	Grand Valley State	Muddy Waters Stadium; Hillsdale, MI	L 21–42	1,966	
October 11	at Ohio Dominican	Panther Stadium; Columbus, OH	L 3–9	1,267	
October 18	Ashland	Muddy Waters Stadium; Hillsdale, MI	L 7–17	1,219	
October 25	at Tiffin	Frost Kalnow Stadium; Tiffin, OH	L 24–31	967	
November 1	Saginaw Valley State	Muddy Waters Stadium; Hillsdale, MI	W 24–17	906	
November 8	Northwood	Muddy Waters Stadium; Hillsdale, MI	W 24–14	919	
November 15	at Wayne State (MI)	Tom Adams Field; Detroit, MI	L 13–20	1,619	

== 2015 ==
2015 Hillsdale Chargers football
- Conference: Great Lakes Intercollegiate Athletic Conference
- Record: 5–6 (5–5 GLIAC)
- Head coach: Keith Otterbein (14th season)
- Offensive coordinator: Nate Shreffler (6th season)
- Home stadium: Frank "Muddy" Waters Stadium

2015 Great Lakes Intercollegiate Athletic Conference football standings
	Conf.			Overall
Team	W		L	W		L
No. 6 Ferris State +^	10	–	0	11	–	1
No. 10 Ashland +^	10	–	0	10	–	1
No. 4 Grand Valley State ^	8	–	2	12	–	3
Ohio Dominican	7	–	3	8	–	3
Michigan Tech	7	–	3	7	–	3
Findlay	5	–	5	6	–	5
Wayne State (MI)	5	–	5	6	–	5
Hillsdale	5	–	5	5	–	6
Northwood	5	–	5	5	–	6
Northern Michigan	4	–	6	5	–	6
Tiffin	4	–	6	5	–	6
Walsh	2	–	8	2	–	8
Lake Erie	2	–	8	2	–	9
Saginaw Valley State	1	–	9	1	–	10
Malone	0	–	10	0	–	10
$ – Conference champion; ^ – NCAA Division II playoff participant; Rankings from AFCA poll

The 2015 Hillsdale Chargers football team represented Hillsdale College as a member of the Great Lakes Intercollegiate Athletic Conference (GLIAC) during the 2015 NCAA Division II football season. In their 14th year under head coach Keith Otterbein, the Chargers compiled a 5–6 record (5–5 in conference games), finished in a four-way tie for sixth place in the GLIAC, and were outscored by a total of 338 to 304.

The team's statistical leaders included Chance Stewart (1,235 passing yards), Joe Reverman (1,083 rushing yards), Trey Brock (26 receptions, 483 yards), and kicker Steven Mette (70 points scored).

=== Schedule ===
Date	Opponent	Site	Result	Attendance	Source
September 5	Findlay	Muddy Waters Stadium; Hillsdale, MI	L 34–45	2,276	
September 12	Lake Erie	Muddy Waters Stadium; Hillsdale, MI	W 52–29	1,196	
September 19	at Northern Michigan	Superior Dome; Marquette, MI	L 24–32	4,289	
September 26	Indianapolis*	Muddy Waters Stadium; Hillsdale, MI	L 7–38	1,262	
October 3	at Grand Valley State	Lubbers Stadium; Allendale, MI	L 14–46	12,552	
October 10	Ohio Dominican	Muddy Waters Stadium; Hillsdale, MI	L 29–34	1,497	
October 17	at Ashland	Jack Miller Stadium; Ashland, OH	L 21–52	3,133	
October 24	Tiffin	Muddy Waters Stadium; Hillsdale, MI	W 38–24	2,026	
October 31	at Saginaw Valley State	Wickes Stadium; University Center, MI	W 26–0	1,012	
November 7	at Northwood	Hantz Stadium; Midland, MI	W 28–14	1,611	
November 14	Wayne State (MI)	Muddy Waters Stadium; Hillsdale, MI	W 31–24 ^{OT}	1,278	
*Non-conference game

== 2016 ==
2016 Hillsdale Chargers football
- Conference: Great Lakes Intercollegiate Athletic Conference
- Record: 5–5 (4–5 GLIAC)
- Head coach: Keith Otterbein (15th season)
- Offensive coordinator: Nate Shreffler (7th season)
- Home stadium: Frank "Muddy" Waters Stadium

2016 Great Lakes Intercollegiate Athletic Conference football standings
	Conf.			Overall
Team	W		L	W		L
No. 4 Grand Valley State $^	10	–	0	12	–	1
No. 5 Ferris State ^	9	–	2	12	–	3
No. 19 Ashland	7	–	2	9	–	2
Tiffin	7	–	3	8	–	3
Ohio Dominican	7	–	4	7	–	4
Wayne State (MI)	7	–	4	7	–	4
Findlay	6	–	5	6	–	5
Saginaw Valley State	5	–	5	5	–	5
Hillsdale	4	–	5	5	–	5
Michigan Tech	4	–	6	4	–	6
Northern Michigan	3	–	7	3	–	8
Northwood	3	–	8	3	–	8
Walsh	0	–	10	1	–	10
Lake Erie	0	–	11	0	–	11
$ – Conference champion; ^ – NCAA Division II playoff participant; Rankings from AFCA poll

The 2016 Hillsdale Chargers football team represented Hillsdale College as a member of the Great Lakes Intercollegiate Athletic Conference (GLIAC) during the 2016 NCAA Division II football season. In their 15th year under head coach Keith Otterbein, the Chargers compiled a 5–5 record (4–5 in conference games), finished in ninth place in the GLIAC, and outscored opponents by a total of 307 to 306.

The team's statistical leaders included: Chance Stewart (2,546 passing yards); Trey Brock (77 receptions, 1,322 yars); Joe Reverman (895 rushing yards, 78 points scored).

=== Schedule ===
Date	Opponent	Site	Result	Attendance	Source
September 3	Indianapolis*	Muddy Waters Stadium; Hillsdale, MI	W 30–24	2,209	
September 10	Walsh	Muddy Waters Stadium; Hillsdale, MI	W 28–10	1,774	
September 17	at Tiffin	Frost Kannow Stadium; Tiffin, OH	L 20–37	2,250	
September 24	Michigan Tech	Muddy Waters Stadium; Hillsdale, MI	W 51–24	2,176	
October 1	at Wayne State (MI)	Tom Adams Field; Detroit, MI	L 30–41	3,749	
October 15	at Findlay	Donnell Stadium; Findlay, OH	L 28–46	1,734	
October 22	Grand Valley State	Muddy Waters Stadium; Hillsdale, MI	L 17–35	1,887	
October 29	at Northern Michigan	Superior Dome; Marquette, MI	W 41–38	1,295	
November 5	Ferris State	Muddy Waters Stadium; Hillsdale, MI	L 20–41	1,376	
November 12	Lake Erie	Muddy Waters Stadium; Hillsdale, MI	W 42–10	803	
*Non-conference game

== 2017 ==
2017 Hillsdale Chargers football
- Conference: Great Midwest Athletic Conference
- Record: 7–4 (5–2 G-MAC)
- Head coach: Keith Otterbein (16th season)
- Offensive coordinator: Nate Shreffler (8th season)
- Home stadium: Frank "Muddy" Waters Stadium

2017 Great Midwest Athletic Conference football standings
	Conf.			Overall
Team	W		L	W		L
Ohio Dominican $	7	–	0	7	–	3
No. 22 Findlay ^	6	–	1	10	–	3
Hillsdale	5	–	2	7	–	4
Walsh	4	–	3	4	–	7
Alderson Broaddus	2	–	5	3	–	8
Lake Erie	2	–	5	2	–	8
Kentucky Wesleyan	1	–	6	2	–	8
Malone	1	–	6	1	–	9
$ – Conference champion; ^ – NCAA Division II playoff participant; Rankings from AFCA poll

The 2017 Hillsdale Chargers football team represented Hillsdale College during the 2017 NCAA Division II football season. After the 2016 season, Hillsdale left the Great Lakes Intercollegiate Athletic Conference (GLIAC) and joined the Great Midwest Athletic Conference (GMAC) for the 2017 season. In their 16th year under head coach Keith Otterbein, the Chargers compiled a 7–4 record (5–2 in conference games), finished third in the G-MAC, and outscored opponents by a total of 379 to 216.

The team's statistical leaders included Chance Stewart (2,695 passing yards), David Graham (1,050 rushing yards, 114 points scored), and Trey Brock (74 receptions, 1,174 yards).

=== Schedule ===
Date	Opponent	Site	Result	Attendance	Source
September 2	at Mercyhurst*	Tullio Field; Erie, PA	W 19–11	1,382	
September 9	Michigan Tech*	Muddy Waters Stadium; Hillsdale, MI	W 31–27	2,371	
September 16	McKendree*	Muddy Waters Stadium; Hillsdale, MI	L 21–24	2,045	
September 23	at Indianapolis*	Key Stadium; Indianapolis, IN	L 38–45	5,834	
September 30	Kentucky Wesleyan	Muddy Waters Stadium; Hillsdale, MI	W 56–0	2,677	
October 7	at Ohio Dominican	Panther Stadium; Columbus, OH	L 27–41	1,932	
October 14	Findlay	Muddy Waters Stadium; Hillsdale, MI	L 13–31	1,138	
October 21	Walsh	Muddy Waters Stadium; Hillsdale, MI	W 38–0	1,519	
October 28	at Alderson Broaddus	Multi-Sport; Philippi, WV	W 37–31	967	
November 4	Malone	Muddy Waters Stadium; Hillsdale, MI	W 45–7	963	
November 11	at Lake Erie	Jack Britt Stadium; Painesville, OH	W 54–0	443	
*Non-conference game

== 2018 ==
2018 Hillsdale Chargers football

G-MAC champion

NCAA Division II second round, L 14–19 at Notre Dame (OH)
- Conference: Great Midwest Athletic Conference
- Record: 10–3 (8–0 G-MAC)
- Head coach: Keith Otterbein (17th season)
- Offensive coordinator: Nate Shreffler (9th season)
- Home stadium: Frank "Muddy" Waters Stadium

2018 Great Midwest Athletic Conference football standings
	Conf.			Overall
Team	W		L	W		L
No. 15 Hillsdale $^	8	–	0	10	–	3
Ohio Dominican	6	–	2	9	–	2
Tiffin	6	–	2	9	–	2
Findlay	6	–	2	8	–	3
Walsh	4	–	4	4	–	6
Alderson Broaddus	3	–	5	4	–	7
Kentucky Wesleyan	2	–	6	3	–	7
Malone	1	–	7	2	–	8
Lake Erie	0	–	8	0	–	11
$ – Conference champion; ^ – NCAA Division II playoff participant; Rankings from AFCA poll

The 2018 Hillsdale Chargers football team represented Hillsdale College as a member of the Great Midwest Athletic Conference (G-MAC) during the 2017 NCAA Division II football season. In their 17th year under head coach Keith Otterbein, the Chargers compiled a 10–3 record (8–0 in conference games), won the G-MAC championship, and outscored opponents by a total of 417 to 255. They advanced to the NCAA Division II playoffs, defeating Kutztown in the first round, then losing to the Notre Dame Falcons in the second round.

Key players included:

- Quarterback Chance Stewart completed 245 of 396 passes (61.87%) for 3,588 yards, 28 touchdowns, eight interceptions, and a 157.27 efficiency rating. Stewart also ranked second on the team with 211 rushing yards.
- David Graham tallied 939 rushing yards on 217 carries for an average of 4.3 yards per carry. He ranked second on the team with 96 points scored on 16 touchdowns.
- Trey Brock led the team with 79 receptions for 1,422 yards and 17 touchdowns. He led the team in scoring with 102 points scored.
- Linebacker Jay Rose led the team with 113 total tackles and 13 tackles for loss.

=== Schedule ===
Date	Time	Opponent	Site	Result	Attendance	Source
September 1	7:00 p.m.	Mercyhurst*	Muddy Waters Stadium; Hillsdale, MI	W 14–9	1,963	
September 8		at Michigan Tech*	Sherman Field; Houghton, MI	L 30–31 ^{OT}	2,814	
September 15		at Ohio Dominican	Panther Stadium; Columbus, OH	W 34–18	1,635	
September 22		Lake Erie	Muddy Waters Stadium; Hillsdale, MI	W 41–7	2,280	
September 29		at Malone	Benson Stadium; Canton, OH	W 45–35	2,045	
October 6		at Findlay	Donnel Stadium; Findlay, OH	W 20–17	1,856	
October 13		Alderson Broaddus	Muddy Waters Stadium; Hillsdale, MI	W 45–24	1,277	
October 20		at Walsh	Tom Benson Stadium; Canton, OH	W 28–9	117	
October 27		Kentucky Wesleyan	Muddy Waters Stadium; Hillsdale, MI	W 34–0	716	
November 3		Tiffin	Muddy Waters Stadium; Hillsdale, MI	W 48–26	1,634	
November 10		at Indianapolis*	Key Stadium; Indianapolis, IN	L 24–34	4,357	
November 17		at Kutztown*	Andre Reed Stadium; Kutztown, PA (NCAA Division II first round)	W 40–26	2,762	
November 24		at Notre Dame (OH)*	Mueller Field; South Euclid, OH (NCAA Division II second round)	L 14–19	1,800	
*Non-conference game; All times are in Eastern time

== 2019 ==
2019 Hillsdale Chargers football
- Conference: Great Midwest Athletic Conference
- Record: 6–5 (4–3 G-MAC)
- Head coach: Keith Otterbein (18th season)
- Offensive coordinator: Nate Shreffler (10th season)
- Home stadium: Frank "Muddy" Waters Stadium

2019 Great Midwest Athletic Conference football standings
	Conf.			Overall
Team	W		L	W		L
No. 23 Tiffin $^	7	–	0	9	–	2
Ohio Dominican #	6	–	1	7	–	3
Findlay	5	–	2	7	–	4
Hillsdale	4	–	3	6	–	5
Lake Erie	2	–	5	3	–	8
Walsh	2	–	5	3	–	8
Alderson Broaddus	1	–	6	1	–	9
Kentucky Wesleyan	1	–	6	1	–	10
$ – Conference champion; ^ – NCAA Division II playoff participant; # – America's Crossroads Bowl participant; Rankings from AFCA poll

The 2019 Hillsdale Chargers football team represented Hillsdale College as a member of the Great Midwest Athletic Conference (G-MAC) during the 2019 NCAA Division II football season. In their 17th year under head coach Keith Otterbein, the Chargers compiled a 6–5 record (4–3 in conference games), finished fourth in the G-MAC, and outscored opponents by a total of 318 to 263.

The team's statistical leaders included quarterback Luke Keller (2,113 passing yards), tailback David Graham (1,049 rushing yards, 104 points scored), and Konnor Maloney (47 receptions, 851 yards).

=== Schedule ===
Date	Opponent	Site	Result	Attendance	Source
September 7	Michigan Tech*	Muddy Waters Stadium; Hillsdale, MI	L 14–29	2,078	
September 14	at Indianapolis*	Key Stadium; Indianapolis, IN	L 21–48	6,723	
September 21	Lake Erie^{†}	Muddy Waters Stadium; Hillsdale, MI	W 34–14	2,297	
September 28	Walsh	Muddy Waters Stadium; Hillsdale, MI	W 30–0	639	
October 5	Concord*	Muddy Waters Stadium; Hillsdale, MI	W 38–14	889	
October 12	at Northwood*	Hantz Stadium; Midland, MI	W 37–30	1,112	
October 19	at Findlay	Donell Stadium; Findlay, OH	L 16–41	902	
October 26	Kentucky Wesleyan	Muddy Waters Stadium; Hillsdale, MI	W 41–14	688	
November 2	at Alderson Broaddus	MSPS; Philippi, WV	W 56–21	674	
November 9	at Tiffin	Frost-Kalnow Stadium; Tiffin, OH	L 24–35	2,125	
November 16	Ohio Dominican	Muddy Waters Stadium; Hillsdale, MI	L 7–17	680	
*Non-conference game; ^{†}Homecoming
