= Michigan Tech Huskies football, 2010–2019 =

American college football seasons

2010–2019 Michigan Tech Huskies football
- Conference: Great Lakes Intercollegiate Athletic Conference
- Head coach: Tom Kearly (2006–2016); Steve Olson (2017–2022)
- Home stadium: Sherman Field (2010–2019)

The Michigan Tech Huskies football program, 2010–2019 represented Michigan Technological University during the 2010s in NCAA Division II college football as a member of the North Division of the Great Lakes Intercollegiate Athletic Conference (GLIAC). The team had two head coaches during the decade: Tom Kearly, who held the post from 2006 to 2016; and Steve Olson, who served from 2017 to 2022. Highlights of the decade included:

- The 2010 Michigan Tech Huskies football team compiled an 8–2 record and finished second in the GLIAC North Division.
- The 2012 Michigan Tech Huskies football team compiled a 7–3 record and tied for the GLIAC North championship.
- The 2014 Michigan Tech Huskies football team compiled a 9–1 in the regular season and advanced to the NCAA Division II playoffs, losing in the first round by a 42–41 score against Angelo State.

The team played its home games at Sherman Field in Houghton, Michigan. In 2019, the facility was renamed Sherman Field at Kearly Stadium in honor of former coaches Ted Kearly (1969–1972) and his son, Tom Kearly (2006–2016). On September 28, 2019, it was officially dedicated in a pregame ceremony prior to the home opener and homecoming game against Grand Valley State.

== Decade overview ==
Year	Head coach	Overall record	Conf. record	Conf. rank	Points scored	Points allowed	Delta	Postseason result	AFCA ranking
2010	Tom Kearly	8–2	8–2	2 (North)	305	166	+139		
2011	Tom Kearly	7–3	7–3	T–1 (North)	291	195	+96		
2012	Tom Kearly	7–4	6–4	T–3 (North)	377	238	+139		
2013	Tom Kearly	6–4	6–4	4 (North)	281	275	-6		
2014	Tom Kearly	9–2	9–1	T–2	337	215	+122	L, NCAA Division II first round	21
2015	Tom Kearly	7–3	7–3	T–4	200	180	+20		
2016	Steve Olson	4–6	4–6	10	142	191	-49		
2017	Steve Olson	4–7	3–6	T–7	197	254	-57		
2018	Steve Olson	4–6	2–6	7	160	223	-63		
2019	Steve Olson	5–5	3–5	T–5	190	243	-53		
TOTAL		61–42							

== 2010 ==
2010 Michigan Tech Huskies football
- Conference: Great Lakes Intercollegiate Athletic Conference
- North Division
- Record: 8–2 (8–2 GLIAC)
- Head coach: Tom Kearly (5th season)
- Offensive coordinator: Erik Ieuter (2nd season)
- Defensive coordinator: Tim Driscoll (7th season)
- Home stadium: Sherman Field

2010 Great Lakes Intercollegiate Athletic Conference football standings
	Conf.			Overall
Team	W		L	W		L
North
No. 10 Grand Valley State $^	9	–	1	11	–	2
No. 25 Michigan Tech	8	–	2	8	–	2
Indianapolis	5	–	5	6	–	5
Ferris State	5	–	5	5	–	6
Northern Michigan	5	–	5	5	–	6
Northwood	5	–	5	5	–	6
Saginaw Valley State	4	–	6	4	–	7
South
No. 21 Wayne State (MI)	8	–	2	9	–	2
No. 16 Hillsdale ^	8	–	2	9	–	3
Ashland	7	–	3	8	–	3
Lake Erie	3	–	7	3	–	8
Ohio Dominican *	2	–	8	2	–	8
Findlay	1	–	9	1	–	10
Tiffin	0	–	10	1	–	10
$ – Conference champion; ^ – NCAA Division II playoff participant; * – Provisional NCAA Division II member; Rankings from AFCA poll

The 2010 Michigan Tech Huskies football team represented Michigan Technological University as a member of the Great Lakes Intercollegiate Athletic Conference (GLIAC) during the 2010 NCAA Division II football season. In their fifth season under head coach Tom Kearly, the Huskies compiled an 8–2 record (8–2 in conference games), finished in second place in the GLIAC North, and outscored opponents by a total of 305 to 166.

Quarterback Steve Short completed 126 of 222 passes (56.8%) for 1,525 yards, 16 touchdowns, and eight interceptions. He also led the team with 1,909 yards of total offense. The team's other statistical leaders included Phil Milbrath (1,412 rushing yards, 96 points, 1,787 all-purpose yards), Pat Carroll (394 receiving yards), and Matt Curtin (33 receptions).

=== Schedule ===
Date	Opponent	Site	Result	Attendance	Source
September 11	at Lake Erie	Jack Britt Memorial Stadium; Painesville, OH	W 42–13	2,168	
September 18	Wayne State (MI)	Sherman Field; Houghton, MI	W 24–7	2,417	
September 25	at Indianapolis	Key Stadium; Indianapolis, IN	W 24–10	4,243	
October 2	Ohio Dominican^{†}	Sherman Field; Houghton, MI	W 45–6	2,669	
October 9	at Saginaw Valley State	Harvey Randall Wickes Memorial Stadium; University Center, MI	L 31–43		
October 16	at No. 8 Hillsdale	Muddy Waters Stadium; Hillsdale, MI	L 17–24	2,117	
October 23	Northwood	Sherman Field; Houghton, MI	W 62–30	1,923	
October 30	No. 1 Grand Valley State	Sherman Field; Houghton, MI	W 20–17	1,976	
November 6	at Ferris State	Top Taggart Field; Big Rapids, MI	W 28–16	2,216	
November 13	Northern Michigan	Sherman Field; Houghton, MI (Miner's Cup)	W 12–0	1,943	
^{†}Homecoming; Rankings from AFCA Poll released prior to the game

== 2011 ==
2011 Michigan Tech Huskies football
- Conference: Great Lakes Intercollegiate Athletic Conference
- North Division
- Record: 7–4 (6–4 GLIAC)
- Head coach: Tom Kearly (6th season)
- Offensive coordinator: Erik Ieuter (3rd season)
- Defensive coordinator: Tim Driscoll (8th season)
- Home stadium: Sherman Field

2011 Great Lakes Intercollegiate Athletic Conference football standings
	Conf.			Overall
Team	W		L	W		L
North
Grand Valley State	7	–	3	8	–	3
Saginaw Valley State ^	7	–	3	7	–	4
Indianapolis	6	–	4	7	–	4
Michigan Tech	6	–	4	7	–	4
Ferris State	5	–	5	6	–	5
Northern Michigan	3	–	7	4	–	7
Northwood	1	–	9	2	–	9
South
Hillsdale $	8	–	2	8	–	3
No. 2 Wayne State (MI) ^	7	–	3	12	–	4
Ohio Dominican	6	–	4	7	–	4
Ashland	6	–	4	6	–	5
Findlay	6	–	4	6	–	5
Lake Erie	2	–	8	3	–	8
Tiffin	0	–	10	0	–	11
$ – Conference champion; ^ – NCAA Division II playoff participant; Rankings from AFCA poll

The 2011 Michigan Tech Huskies football team represented Michigan Technological University as a member of the North Division of the Great Lakes Intercollegiate Athletic Conference (GLIAC) during the 2011 NCAA Division II football season. In their sixth season under head coach Tom Kearly, the Huskies compiled a 7–4 record (6–4 in conference games), tied for third place in the GLIAC North, and outscored opponents by a total of 291 to 195.

=== Schedule ===
Date	Opponent	Rank	Site	Result	Attendance	Source
September 3	at Winona State*		Wireless Stadium; Winona, MN	W 23–6	2,692	
September 10	Lake Erie		Sherman Field; Houghton, MI	W 41–10	1,840	
September 17	at No. 14 Wayne State (MI)	No. 22	Tom Adams Field; Detroit, MI	L 10–27	3,809	
September 24	Indianapolis		Sherman Field; Houghton, MI	W 28–16	2,111	
October 1	at Ohio Dominican		Panther Field; Columbus, OH	W 35–13	1,032	
October 8	Saginaw Valley State^{†}		Sherman Field; Houghton, MI	L 41–44	3,092	
October 15	Hillsdale		Sherman Field; Houghton, MI	L 7–13	1,658	
October 22	at Northwood		Hantz Stadium; Midland, MI	W 24–10	1,331	
October 29	at Grand Valley State		Lubbers Stadium; Allendale, MI	L 20–24	9,199	
November 5	Ferris State		Sherman Field; Houghton, MI	W 41–14	1,671	
November 12	at Northern Michigan		Superior Dome; Marquette, MI (Miner's Cup)	W 21–18	4,056	
*Non-conference game; ^{†}Homecoming; Rankings from AFCA Poll released prior to the game

== 2012 ==
2012 Michigan Tech Huskies football

GLIAC North co-champion
- Conference: Great Lakes Intercollegiate Athletic Conference
- North Division
- Record: 7–3 (7–3 GLIAC)
- Head coach: Tom Kearly (7th season)
- Offensive coordinator: Erik Ieuter (4th season)
- Defensive coordinator: Tim Driscoll (9th season)
- Home stadium: Sherman Field

2012 Great Lakes Intercollegiate Athletic Conference football standings
	Conf.			Overall
Team	W		L	W		L
North
Grand Valley State	7	–	3	8	–	3
Saginaw Valley State	7	–	3	8	–	3
Michigan Tech	7	–	3	7	–	3
Hillsdale	7	–	3	7	–	4
Ferris State	6	–	4	7	–	4
Wayne State (MI)	5	–	5	5	–	5
Northwood	4	–	6	5	–	6
Northern Michigan	4	–	6	5	–	6
South
No. 9 Ashland $^	10	–	0	11	–	1
Ohio Dominican	7	–	3	8	–	3
Findlay	7	–	3	7	–	3
Lake Erie	3	–	7	3	–	8
Notre Dame (OH)	2	–	8	3	–	8
Tiffin	2	–	8	3	–	8
Walsh *	2	–	8	3	–	8
Malone *	1	–	9	1	–	9
$ – Conference champion; ^ – NCAA Division II playoff participant; * – Provisional NCAA Division II member; Rankings from AFCA poll

The 2012 Michigan Tech Huskies football team represented Michigan Technological University as a member of the North Division of the Great Lakes Intercollegiate Athletic Conference (GLIAC) during the 2012 NCAA Division II football season. In their seventh season under head coach Tom Kearly, the Huskies compiled a 7–3 record (7–3 in conference games), tied for the GLIAC North championship, and outscored opponents by a total of 377 to 238. It was the second GLIAC title in Michigan Tech history.

Key players included running back Charlie Leffingwell and wide receiver Pat Carroll.

=== Schedule ===
Date	Opponent	Rank	Site	Result	Attendance	Source
September 8	Tiffin		Sherman Field; Houghton, MI	W 51–15	2,560	
September 15	at Walsh		North Canton, OH	W 30–7	2,300	
September 22	Findlay		Sherman Field; Houghton, MI	W 35–10	1,963	
September 29	Grand Valley State	No. 22	Sherman Field; Houghton, MI	L 43–51	4,684	
October 6	at Northern Michigan		Superior Dome; Marquette, MI (Miner's Cup)	W 41–17	4,954	
October 13	Northwood		Sherman Field; Houghton, MI	W 28–21	2,295	
October 20	at Ferris State		Big Rapids, MI	L 49–56	2,291	
October 27	at Saginaw Valley State		Harvey Randall Wickes Memorial Stadium; University Center, MI	L 23–34	3,782	
November 3	Hillsdale		Sherman Field; Houghton, MI	W 42–14	1,662	
November 10	at Wayne State (MI)		Tom Adams Field; Detroit, MI	W 35–13	2,395	
Rankings from AFCA Poll released prior to the game

== 2013 ==
2013 Michigan Tech Huskies football
- Conference: Great Lakes Intercollegiate Athletic Conference
- North Division
- Record: 6–4 (6–4 GLIAC)
- Head coach: Tom Kearly (8th season)
- Offensive coordinator: Erik Ieuter (5th season)
- Defensive coordinator: Tim Driscoll (10th season)
- Home stadium: Sherman Field

2013 Great Lakes Intercollegiate Athletic Conference football standings
	Conf.			Overall
Team	W		L	W		L
North
No. 22 Saginaw Valley State ^	9	–	1	9	–	3
Ferris State	8	–	2	8	–	3
No. 3 Grand Valley State ^	7	–	2	12	–	3
Michigan Tech	6	–	4	6	–	4
Hillsdale	5	–	4	5	–	6
Northern Michigan	3	–	7	3	–	7
Wayne State (MI)	3	–	7	3	–	8
Northwood	1	–	8	2	–	9
South
No. 12 Ohio Dominican $^	9	–	0	10	–	1
Findlay	6	–	3	8	–	3
Ashland	5	–	4	5	–	5
Lake Erie	3	–	6	4	–	7
Walsh	3	–	6	3	–	8
Malone	1	–	8	2	–	9
Tiffin	1	–	8	2	–	9
$ – Conference champion; ^ – NCAA Division II playoff participant; Rankings from AFCA poll

The 2013 Michigan Tech Huskies football team represented Michigan Technological University as a member of the North Division of the Great Lakes Intercollegiate Athletic Conference (GLIAC) during the 2013 NCAA Division II football season. In their eighth season under head coach Tom Kearly, the Huskies compiled a 6–4 record (6–4 in conference games), finished fourth in the GLIAC North, and were outscored by a total of 281 to 275.

=== Schedule ===
Date	Time	Opponent	Site	Result	Attendance	Source
September 14	1:30 p.m.	at Tiffin	Frost–Kalnow Stadium; Tiffin, OH	W 40–14		
September 21	1:00 p.m.	Walsh^{†}	Sherman Field; Houghton, MI	W 29–7	3,224	
September 28	3:00 p.m.	at Findlay	Donnell Stadium; Findlay, OH	L 19–40	2,224	
October 5	7:00 p.m.	at No. 25 Grand Valley State	Lubbers Stadium; Allendale, MI	L 3–49	13,127	
October 12	1:00 p.m.	Northern Michigan	Sherman Field; Houghton, MI (Miner's Cup)	W 31–7	2,862	
October 19	12:00 p.m.	at Northwood	Hantz Stadium; Midland, MI	W 33–31	1,978	
October 26	1:00 p.m.	Ferris State	Sherman Field; Houghton, MI	L 27–30	1,600	
November 2	1:00 p.m.	No. 23 Saginaw Valley State	Sherman Field; Houghton, MI	L 35–55	1,492	
November 9	1:00 p.m.	at Hillsdale	Muddy Waters Stadium; Hillsdale, MI	W 30–27 ^{OT}	1,007	
November 16	1:00 p.m.	Wayne State (MI)	Sherman Field; Houghton, MI	W 28–21	1,319	
^{†}Homecoming; Rankings from AFCA Poll released prior to the game; All times are in Eastern time

== 2014 ==
2014 Michigan Tech Huskies football

NCAA Division II first round, L 41–42 vs. Angelo State
- Conference: Great Lakes Intercollegiate Athletic Conference

Ranking
- AFCA: No. 21
- Record: 9–2 (9–1 GLIAC)
- Head coach: Tom Kearly (9th season)
- Offensive coordinator: Erik Ieuter (6th season)
- Defensive coordinator: Ken Klein (1st season)
- Home stadium: Sherman Field

2014 Great Lakes Intercollegiate Athletic Conference football standings
	Conf.			Overall
Team	W		L	W		L
No. 11 Ferris State $^	10	–	0	11	–	1
No. 4 Ohio Dominican ^	9	–	1	11	–	2
No. 21 Michigan Tech ^	9	–	1	9	–	2
Ashland	8	–	2	8	–	2
Wayne State (MI)	6	–	4	7	–	4
Grand Valley State	6	–	4	6	–	5
Findlay	4	–	6	5	–	6
Northwood	4	–	6	5	–	6
Tiffin	4	–	6	5	–	6
Hillsdale	4	–	6	4	–	7
Lake Erie	3	–	7	4	–	7
Walsh	3	–	7	4	–	7
Northern Michigan	2	–	8	3	–	8
Saginaw Valley State	2	–	8	2	–	9
Malone	1	–	9	1	–	10
$ – Conference champion; ^ – NCAA Division II playoff participant; Rankings from AFCA poll

The 2014 Michigan Tech Huskies football team represented Michigan Technological University as a member of the Great Lakes Intercollegiate Athletic Conference (GLIAC) during the 2014 NCAA Division II football season. In their ninth season under head coach Tom Kearly, the Huskies compiled a 9–2 record (9–1 in conference games), tied for second place in the GLIAC, was ranked No. 21 in the final Division II poll, and outscored opponents by a total of 337 to 216.

The Huskies' only loss in the regular season was to Ferris State. They then advanced to the NCAA Division II playoffs, losing in the first round by a 42-41 score against Angelo State; Michigan Tech kicker Garrett Mead, who had kicked two game-winning field goals earlier in the season, missed a 26-yard field goal with three second remaining in the game.

The team's statistical leaders included senior running back Charlie Leffingwell with 1,448 rushing yards and 120 points scored; senior quarterback Tyler Scarlett with 2,154 passing yards and 2,353 yards of total offense; sophomore wide receiver Brandon Cowie with 58 receptions for 786 yards; and junior defensive back Brett Gervais with 67 tackles.

=== Schedule ===
Date	Opponent	Rank	Site	Result	Attendance	Source
September 4	at Wayne State (MI)		Tom Adams Field; Detroit, MI	W 18–17	3,103	
September 13	at Malone		Fawcett Stadium; Canton, OH	W 37–6	1,200	
September 20	Saginaw Valley State		Sherman Field; Houghton, MI	W 26–20	2,202	
September 27	at Northern Michigan		Superior Dome; Marquette, MI (Miner's Cup)	W 34–31	6,427	
October 11	at Northwood	No. 22	Hantz Stadium; Midland, MI	W 21–6	3,054	
October 18	Grand Valley State	No. 20	Sherman Field; Houghton, MI	W 35–14	2,025	
October 25	No. 6 Ferris State	No. 13	Sherman Field; Houghton, MI	L 3–37	2,648	
November 1	at Tiffin	No. 21	Tiffin, OH	W 35–17	372	
November 8	No. 22 Ashland	No. 20	Sherman Field; Houghton, MI	W 28–12	1,435	
November 15	Lake Erie	No. 20	Sherman Field; Houghton, MI	W 59–14	1,261	
November 22	No T–23 Angelo State	No. 18	Sherman Field; Houghton, MI (NCAA Division II first round)	L 41–42	1,131	
Rankings from AFCA Poll released prior to the game

== 2015 ==
2015 Michigan Tech Huskies football
- Conference: Great Lakes Intercollegiate Athletic Conference
- Record: 7–3 (7–3 GLIAC)
- Head coach: Tom Kearly (10th season)
- Offensive coordinator: Erik Ieuter (7th season)
- Defensive coordinator: Ken Klein (2nd season)
- Home stadium: Sherman Field

2015 Great Lakes Intercollegiate Athletic Conference football standings
	Conf.			Overall
Team	W		L	W		L
No. 6 Ferris State +^	10	–	0	11	–	1
No. 10 Ashland +^	10	–	0	10	–	1
No. 4 Grand Valley State ^	8	–	2	12	–	3
Ohio Dominican	7	–	3	8	–	3
Michigan Tech	7	–	3	7	–	3
Findlay	5	–	5	6	–	5
Wayne State (MI)	5	–	5	6	–	5
Hillsdale	5	–	5	5	–	6
Northwood	5	–	5	5	–	6
Northern Michigan	4	–	6	5	–	6
Tiffin	4	–	6	5	–	6
Walsh	2	–	8	2	–	8
Lake Erie	2	–	8	2	–	9
Saginaw Valley State	1	–	9	1	–	10
Malone	0	–	10	0	–	10
$ – Conference champion; ^ – NCAA Division II playoff participant; Rankings from AFCA poll

The 2015 Michigan Tech Huskies football team represented Michigan Technological University as a member of the Great Lakes Intercollegiate Athletic Conference (GLIAC) during the 2015 NCAA Division II football season. In their tenth and final season under head coach Tom Kearly, the Huskies compiled a 7–3 record (7–3 in conference games), tied for fourth place in the GLIAC.

The team's statistical leaders included Brandon Cowie with 2,242 yards of total offense; Kevin Miller with 593 rushing yards; David Walter with 51 receptions for 576 yards; and Alex Sherbinow with 66 points scored.

=== Schedule ===
Date	Opponent	Rank	Site	Result	Attendance	Source
September 3	Wayne State (MI)		Sherman Field; Houghton, MI	W 20–15	2,645	
September 12	Malone		Sherman Field; Houghton, MI	W 28–27	1,937	
September 19	at Saginaw Valley State		Wickes Stadium; University Center, MI	W 35–21	7,325	
September 26	Northern Michigan	No. 21	Sherman Field; Houghton, MI (Miner's Cup)	W 24–23	3,918	
October 10	Northwood	No. 14	Sherman Field; Houghton, MI	W 30–14	2,398	
October 17	at No. 18 Grand Valley State	No. 12	Lubbers Stadium; Allendale, MI	L 21–38	10,072	
October 24	at No. 3 Ferris State	No. 17	Top Taggart Field; Big Rapids, MI	L 14–24	4,285	
October 31	Tiffin	No. 22	Sherman Field; Houghton, MI	W 39–38 ^{OT}	1,386	
November 7	at No. 5 Ashland	No. 22	Ashland, OH	L 14–40	4,002	
November 14	at Lake Erie		Painesville, OH	W 63–23	382	
Rankings from AFCA Poll released prior to the game

== 2016 ==
2016 Michigan Tech Huskies football
- Conference: Great Lakes Intercollegiate Athletic Conference
- Record: 4–6 (4–6 GLIAC)
- Head coach: Steve Olson (1st season)
- Offensive coordinator: Erik Ieuter (8th season)
- Defensive coordinator: Ken Klein (3rd season)
- Home stadium: Sherman Field

2016 Great Lakes Intercollegiate Athletic Conference football standings
	Conf.			Overall
Team	W		L	W		L
No. 4 Grand Valley State $^	10	–	0	12	–	1
No. 5 Ferris State ^	9	–	2	12	–	3
No. 19 Ashland	7	–	2	9	–	2
Tiffin	7	–	3	8	–	3
Ohio Dominican	7	–	4	7	–	4
Wayne State (MI)	7	–	4	7	–	4
Findlay	6	–	5	6	–	5
Saginaw Valley State	5	–	5	5	–	5
Hillsdale	4	–	5	5	–	5
Michigan Tech	4	–	6	4	–	6
Northern Michigan	3	–	7	3	–	8
Northwood	3	–	8	3	–	8
Walsh	0	–	10	1	–	10
Lake Erie	0	–	11	0	–	11
$ – Conference champion; ^ – NCAA Division II playoff participant; Rankings from AFCA poll

The 2016 Michigan Tech Huskies football team represented Michigan Technological University as a member of the Great Lakes Intercollegiate Athletic Conference (GLIAC) during the 2016 NCAA Division II football season. In their first season under head coach Steve Olson, the Huskies compiled a 4–6 record (4–6 in conference games) and finished in tenth place in the GLIAC.

The team's statistical leaders included senior quarterback Brandon Cowie with 1,888 passing yards and 1,992 yards of total offense; junior running back Josh Williams with 574 rushing yards on 129 carries; junior wide receiver Ian Fischer with 53 receptions for 744 yards; and junior kicker Josh King with 50 points scored.

=== Schedule ===
Date	Opponent	Site	Result	Attendance	Source
September 3	Walsh	Sherman Field; Houghton, MI	W 33–7	2,825	
September 10	No. 7 Ferris State	Sherman Field; Houghton, MI	L 28–30	1,830	
September 17	at Ohio Dominican	Panther Stadium; Columbus, OH	W 17–10	1,631	
September 24	at Hillsdale	Muddy Waters Stadium; Hillsdale, MI	L 24–51	2,176	
October 1	Saginaw Valley State	Sherman Field; Houghton, MI	L 16–17	3,328	
October 15	at Tiffin	Frost–Kalnow Stadium; Tiffin, OH	L 17–24	1,557	
October 22	at Northwood	Hantz Stadium; Midland, MI	L 3–17	2,105	
October 29	Ashland	Sherman Field; Houghton, MI	W 24–21	2,016	
November 5	at Northern Michigan	Superior Dome; Marquette, MI (Miner's Cup)	W 51–45 ^{2OT}	3,610	
November 12	Findlay	Sherman Field; Houghton, MI	L 21–59	1,622	
Rankings from AFCA Poll released prior to the game

== 2017 ==
2017 Michigan Tech Huskies football
- Conference: Great Lakes Intercollegiate Athletic Conference
- Record: 4–7 (3–6 GLIAC)
- Head coach: Steve Olson (2nd season)
- Offensive coordinator: Dan Mettlach (1st season)
- Defensive coordinator: Ken Klein (4th season)
- Home stadium: Sherman Field

2017 Great Lakes Intercollegiate Athletic Conference football standings
	Conf.			Overall
Team	W		L	W		L
No. 10 Ashland $^	9	–	0	11	–	2
No. 5 Ferris State ^	8	–	1	11	–	2
Grand Valley State	7	–	2	8	–	3
Tiffin	5	–	4	6	–	5
Northwood	5	–	4	7	–	4
Wayne State (MI)	4	–	5	5	–	6
Michigan Tech	3	–	6	4	–	7
Saginaw Valley State	3	–	6	5	–	6
Northern Michigan	1	–	8	1	–	9
Davenport *	0	–	9	1	–	10
$ – Conference champion; ^ – NCAA Division II playoff participant; * – Provisional Division II member; Rankings from AFCA poll

The 2017 Michigan Tech Huskies football team represented Michigan Technological University as a member of the Great Lakes Intercollegiate Athletic Conference (GLIAC) during the 2017 NCAA Division II football season. In their second season under head coach Steve Olson, the Huskies compiled a 4–7 record (3–6 in conference games) and tied for seventh place in the GLIAC.

The team's statistical leaders included junior quarterback Jake Brown with 1,085 passing yards and 1,243 yards of total offense; senior running back John Williams with 842 rushing yards and 66 points scored; and sophomore wide receiver Jacob Wenzlick with 41 receptions for 444 yards.

=== Schedule ===
Date	Opponent	Site	Result	Attendance	Source
August 31	Truman State*	Sherman Field; Houghton, MI	W 38–14	2,920	
September 9	at Hillsdale*	Hillsdale, MI	L 27–31	2,371	
September 16	No. 12 Grand Valley State	Sherman Field; Houghton, MI	L 7–42	1,883	
September 23	at Saginaw Valley State	Harvey Randall Wickes Memorial Stadium; University Center, MI	W 28–24	3,891	
September 30	Northern Michigan	Sherman Field; Houghton, MI (Miner's Cup)	W 28–21	2,979	
October 7	at Northwood	Midland, MI	L 24–29	2,906	
October 14	at No. 16 Ashland	Ashland, OH	L 0–48	3,875	
October 21	Wayne State (MI)	Sherman Field; Houghton, MI	L 14–20	1,904	
October 28	Davenport	Sherman Field; Houghton, MI	W 17–10	788	
November 4	at Tiffin	Tiffin, OH	L 7–14	1,750	
November 11	No. 10 Ferris State	Sherman Field; Houghton, MI	L 7–49	1,319	
*Non-conference game; Rankings from AFCA Poll released prior to the game

== 2018 ==
2018 Michigan Tech Huskies football
- Conference: Great Lakes Intercollegiate Athletic Conference
- Record: 4–6 (2–6 GLIAC)
- Head coach: Steve Olson (3rd season)
- Offensive coordinator: Dan Mettlach (2nd season)
- Defensive coordinator: Ken Klein (5th season)
- Home stadium: Sherman Field

2018 Great Lakes Intercollegiate Athletic Conference football standings
	Conf.			Overall
Team	W		L	W		L
No. 2 Ferris State $^	8	–	0	15	–	1
No. 14 Grand Valley State ^	7	–	1	10	–	2
Ashland	6	–	2	6	–	4
Saginaw Valley State	5	–	3	8	–	3
Davenport *	3	–	5	6	–	5
Northwood	3	–	5	3	–	7
Michigan Tech	2	–	6	4	–	6
Northern Michigan	1	–	7	3	–	8
Wayne State (MI)	1	–	7	2	–	9
$ – Conference champion; ^ – NCAA Division II playoff participant; * – Provisional NCAA Division II member; Rankings from AFCA poll

The 2018 Michigan Tech Huskies football team represented Michigan Technological University as a member of the Great Lakes Intercollegiate Athletic Conference (GLIAC) during the 2018 NCAA Division II football season. In their third season under head coach Steve Olson, the Huskies compiled a 4–6 record (2–6 in conference games) and finished in seventh place in the GLIAC.

The team's statistical leaders included sophomore quarterback Will Ark with 1,654 passing yards and 1,705 yards of total offense; freshman running back Jared Smith with 577 rushing yards; senior wide receiver Jacob Wenzlick with 52 receptions for 872 yards; and freshman kicker Eric Zeebor with 44 points scored.

=== Schedule ===
Date	Time	Opponent	Site	Result	Attendance	Source
August 30	8:00 p.m.	at Truman State*	Kirksville, MO	W 20–10	3,361	
September 8	1:00 p.m.	Hillsdale*	Sherman Field; Houghton, MI	W 31–30 ^{OT}	2,814	
September 15	1:00 p.m.	Davenport	Sherman Field; Houghton, MI	L 21–23	1,808	
September 22	7:00 p.m.	at No. 5 Grand Valley State	Lubbers Stadium; Allendale, MI	L 20–45	16,671	
September 29	1:00 p.m.	Saginaw Valley State	Harvey Randall Wickes Memorial Stadium; University Center, MI	L 0–10	2,173	
October 6	2:00 p.m.	vs. No. 3 Ferris State	Fifth Third Ballpark; Comstock Park, MI	L 24–42	3,285	
October 13	1:00 p.m.	Wayne State (MI)	Sherman Field; Houghton, MI	W 23–20	1,941	
October 20	1:00 p.m.	at Ashland	Ashland, OH	L 7–27	2,084	
October 27	1:00 p.m.	at Northern Michigan	Superior Dome; Marquette, MI (Miner's Cup)	W 35–33	4,359	
November 10	12:30 p.m.	Northwood	Sherman Field; Houghton, MI	L 23–26	1,506	
*Non-conference game; Rankings from AFCA Poll released prior to the game; All times are in Eastern time

== 2019 ==
2019 Michigan Tech Huskies football
- Conference: Great Lakes Intercollegiate Athletic Conference
- Record: 5–5 (3–5 GLIAC)
- Head coach: Steve Olson (4th season)
- Offensive coordinator: Dan Mettlach (3rd season)
- Defensive coordinator: Ken Klein (6th season)
- Home stadium: Kearly Stadium

2019 Great Lakes Intercollegiate Athletic Conference football standings
	Conf.			Overall
Team	W		L	W		L
No. 3 Ferris State $^	8	–	0	12	–	1
Wayne State (MI)	7	–	1	8	–	3
Ashland	6	–	2	7	–	4
Grand Valley State	5	–	3	8	–	3
Davenport	3	–	5	5	–	5
Michigan Tech	3	–	5	5	–	5
Saginaw Valley State	3	–	5	5	–	6
Northwood	1	–	7	1	–	10
Northern Michigan	0	–	8	1	–	9
$ – Conference champion; ^ – NCAA Division II playoff participant; Rankings from AFCA poll

The 2019 Michigan Tech Huskies football team represented Michigan Tech University as a member of the Great Lakes Intercollegiate Athletic Conference (GLIAC) during the 2019 NCAA Division II football season. Led by Steve Olson in his fourth and final season as head coach, the Huskies compiled an overall record of 5–5 with a mark of 3–5 in conference play, placing in a three-way tie for fifth in the GLAIC. Michigan Tech played home games at Kearly Stadium in Houghton, Michigan.

=== Schedule ===
Date	Time	Opponent	Site	Result	Attendance
September 7	1:00 p.m.	at No. 19 Hillsdale*	Muddy Waters Stadium; Hillsdale, MI	W 29–14	2,078
September 14	1:00 p.m.	at McKendree*	Leemon Field; Lebanon, IL	W 24–19	1,663
September 21	1:30 p.m.	at Saginaw Valley State	Harvey Randall Wickes Memorial Stadium; University Center, MI	L 7–23	4,850
September 28	1:00 p.m.	No. 9 Grand Valley State^{†}	Sherman Field at Kearly Stadium; Houghton, MI	L 16–21	2,649
October 12	1:05 p.m.	Northern Michigan	Sherman Field at Kearly Stadium; Houghton, MI (Miner's Cup)	W 24–20	2,608
October 19	12:05 p.m.	at Davenport	Farmers Insurance Complex; Caledonia, MI	W 30–17	1,242
October 26	1:00 p.m.	at Ashland	Ashland, OH	L 12–21	2,078
November 2	1:00 p.m.	No. 2 Ferris State	Sherman Field at Kearly Stadium; Houghton, MI	L 0–52	1,280
November 9	1:07 p.m.	at Wayne State (MI)	Tom Adams Field; Detroit, MI	L 14–35	2,030
September 19	1:00 p.m.	Northwood	Sherman Field at Kearly Stadium; Houghton, MI	W 34–21	1,177
*Non-conference game; ^{†}Homecoming; Rankings from AFCA Poll released prior to the game; All times are in Eastern time

=== Coaching staff ===
Name	Position	Season
Steve Olson	Head coach, defensive line coach	3rd
Dan Mettlach	Associate head coach, offensive coordinator	3rd
Phil Milbrath	Running backs coach, special teams coordinator	3rd
Bryan Thomas	Defensive coordinator, linebackers	10th
Josh Wood	Secondary defensive coordinator, recruiting coordinator	9th
Jace Daniels	Offensive line coach	1st
Ken Klein	Defensive line coach	8th
