= Ferris State Bulldogs football, 1990–1999 =

American college football season

1990–1999 Ferris State Bulldogs football
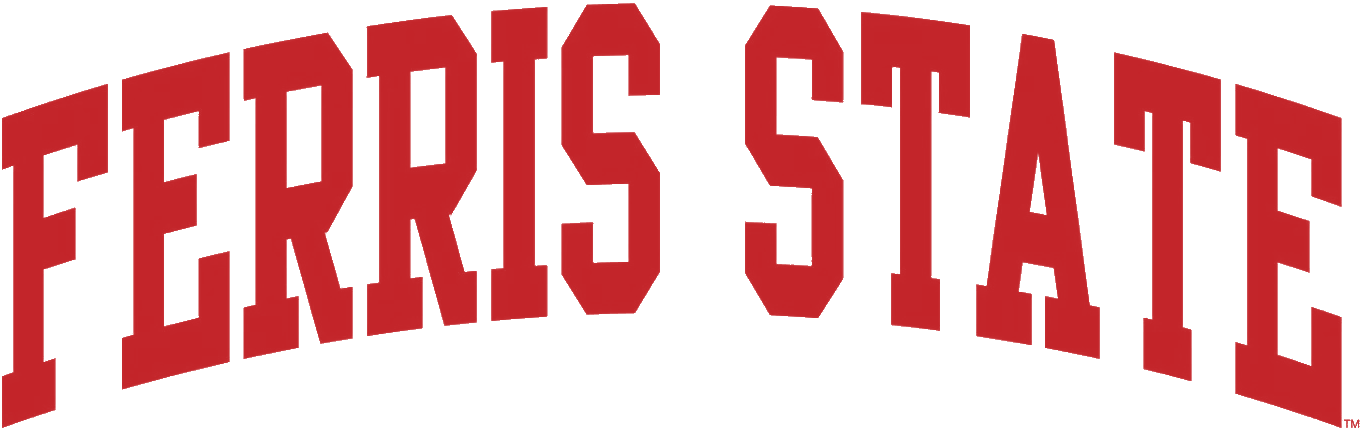
- Conference: Midwest Intercollegiate Football Conference (1990–1998), Great Lakes Intercollegiate Athletic Conference (1999)
- Head coach: Keith Otterbein (1986–1994); Jeff Pierce (1995–2011)
- Home stadium: Top Taggart Field

The Ferris State Bulldogs football program, 1990–1999 represented Ferris State University during the 1990s in NCAA Division II college football as a member of the Midwest Intercollegiate Football Conference (MIFC) and, starting in 1999, the Great Lakes Intercollegiate Athletic Conference (GLIAC). The team was led by head coaches Keith Otterbein (1986–1994) and Jeff Pierce (1995–2011). From 1992 to 1996, Ferris State won five consecutive MIFC championships and advanced each year to the NCAA Division II playoffs. Highlights included:

- The 1992 team compiled a 10–3 record, finished in a four-way tie for the MIFC championship, and advanced to the NCAA Division II playoffs, losing to New Haven in the second round.
- The 1993 team compiled a 9–1–2, won the MIFC championship, and lost to Indiana (PA) in the Division II playoffs.
- The 1994 team compiled an 11–1 record, won the MIFC championship, and lost to Indiana (PA) in the Division II quarterfinals.
- The 1995 team compiled a 12–1, won the MIFC championship, and lost to national champion North Alabama in the Division II semifinals.
- The 1996 team compiled a 10–2 record, won the MIFC championship, and lost to Clarion in a Division II quarterfinal playoff game.

The team played its home games at Top Taggart Field in Big Rapids, Michigan.

== Decade overview ==
| Year | Head coach | Overall record | Conf. record | Conf. rank | Points scored | Points against | Delta |
|---|---|---|---|---|---|---|---|
| 1990 | Keith Otterbein | 6–4–1 | 5–4–1 | T4 | 245 | 203 | +42 |
| 1991 | Keith Otterbein | 5–6 | 5–5 | T4 | 174 | 218 | -44 |
| 1992 | Keith Otterbein | 10–3 | 8–2 | T1 | 308 | 165 | +143 |
| 1993 | Keith Otterbein | 9–1–2 | 8–0–2 | 1 | 359 | 159 | +200 |
| 1994 | Keith Otterbein | 11–1 | 10–0 | 1 | 365 | 218 | +147 |
| 1995 | Jeff Pierce | 12–1 | 10–0 | 1 | 440 | 280 | +160 |
| 1996 | Jeff Pierce | 10–2 | 9–1 | 1 | 334 | 209 | +125 |
| 1997 | Jeff Pierce | 3–7 | 3–7 | T7 | 222 | 243 | -21 |
| 1998 | Jeff Pierce | 5–6 | 5–5 | T6 | 355 | 346 | +9 |
| 1999 | Jeff Pierce | 7–3 | 7–2 | T1 | 473 | 262 | +211 |
| TOTAL | | 78–34–3 | 70–26–3 | | | | |

== 1990 ==
1990 Ferris State Bulldogs football
- Conference: Midwest Intercollegiate Football Conference
- Record: 6–4–1 (5–4–1 MIFC)
- Head coach: Keith Otterbein (5th season)
- Home stadium: Top Taggart Field

1990 Midwest Intercollegiate Football Conference standings
| | Conf. | | | | | Overall |
| Team | W | | L | | T | W | | L | | T |
|---|---|---|---|---|---|---|---|---|---|---|
| No. 6 Grand Valley State $^ | 9 | – | 1 | – | 0 | 10 | – | 2 | – | 0 |
| No. T–20 Ashland | 7 | – | 3 | – | 0 | 7 | – | 3 | – | 1 |
| Hillsdale | 7 | – | 3 | – | 0 | 7 | – | 4 | – | 0 |
| Ferris State | 5 | – | 4 | – | 1 | 6 | – | 4 | – | 1 |
| Butler | 5 | – | 4 | – | 1 | 5 | – | 5 | – | 1 |
| Northern Michigan | 5 | – | 4 | – | 1 | 5 | – | 5 | – | 1 |
| Saginaw Valley State | 5 | – | 5 | – | 0 | 6 | – | 5 | – | 0 |
| Indianapolis | 3 | – | 6 | – | 1 | 3 | – | 6 | – | 1 |
| Wayne State (MI) | 3 | – | 7 | – | 0 | 3 | – | 7 | – | 0 |
| Saint Joseph's (IN) | 3 | – | 7 | – | 0 | 3 | – | 7 | – | 0 |
| Valparaiso | 1 | – | 9 | – | 0 | 1 | – | 9 | – | 0 |
$ – Conference champion; ^ – NCAA Division II playoff participant; Rankings from NCAA Division II Football Committee poll

The 1990 Ferris State Bulldogs football team represented Ferris State University (GVSU) as a member of the Midwest Intercollegiate Football Conference (MIFC) during the 1990 NCAA Division II football season. In their fifth season under head coach Keith Otterbein, the Bulldogs compiled a 6–4–1 record (5–4–1 in conference games), finished in a three-way tie for fourth place in the MIFC, and outscored opponents by a total of 245 to 203.

=== Schedule ===
| Date | Opponent | Site | Result | Attendance | Source |
|---|---|---|---|---|---|
| September 1 | at Michigan Tech | Houghton, MI | W 30–19 | 3,201 | |
| September 8 | at Ashland | Ashland, OH | L 20–22 | | |
| September 15 | Hillsdale | Top Taggart Field; Big Rapids, MI | W 14–10 | | |
| September 22 | at Wayne State (MI) | Detroit, MI | L 17–29 | | |
| September 29 | No. 11 Northern Michigan | Top Taggart Field; Big Rapids, MI | T 14–14 | | |
| October 6 | at Valparaiso | Brown Field; Valparaiso, IN | W 38–13 | | |
| October 13 | at No. 3 Grand Valley State | Lubbers Stadium; Allendale, MI (Anchor–Bone Classic) | L 12–42 | 5,866 | |
| October 20 | Butler | Top Taggart Field; Big Rapids, MI | W 27–18 | | |
| October 27 | at Indianapolis | Indianapolis, IN | W 29–15 | | |
| November 3 | Saginaw Valley State | Top Taggart Field; Big Rapids, MI | L 14–21 | | |
| November 10 | Saint Joseph's (IN) | Top Taggart Field; Big Rapids, MI | W 30–0 | | |
Rankings from NCAA Division II Football Committee Poll released prior to the game

== 1991 ==
1991 Ferris State Bulldogs football
- Conference: Midwest Intercollegiate Football Conference
- Record: 5–6 (5–5 MIFC)
- Head coach: Keith Otterbein (6th season)
- Home stadium: Top Taggart Field

1991 Midwest Intercollegiate Football Conference standings
| | Conf. | | | | | Overall |
| Team | W | | L | | T | W | | L | | T |
|---|---|---|---|---|---|---|---|---|---|---|
| No. 5 Butler $^ | 9 | – | 1 | – | 0 | 9 | – | 2 | – | 0 |
| No. 15 Ashland | 8 | – | 2 | – | 0 | 9 | – | 2 | – | 0 |
| No. 9 Grand Valley State ^ | 8 | – | 2 | – | 0 | 9 | – | 3 | – | 0 |
| Saginaw Valley State | 5 | – | 5 | – | 0 | 6 | – | 5 | – | 0 |
| Ferris State | 5 | – | 5 | – | 0 | 5 | – | 6 | – | 0 |
| Hillsdale | 5 | – | 5 | – | 0 | 5 | – | 6 | – | 0 |
| Wayne State (MI) | 4 | – | 6 | – | 0 | 4 | – | 6 | – | 0 |
| Saint Joseph's (IN) | 4 | – | 6 | – | 0 | 4 | – | 6 | – | 0 |
| Northern Michigan | 3 | – | 6 | – | 1 | 3 | – | 6 | – | 1 |
| Indianapolis | 2 | – | 8 | – | 0 | 2 | – | 8 | – | 0 |
| Valparaiso | 1 | – | 8 | – | 1 | 1 | – | 8 | – | 1 |
$ – Conference champion; ^ – NCAA Division II playoff participant; Rankings from NCAA Division II Football Committee poll

The 1991 Ferris State Bulldogs football team represented Ferris State University (GVSU) as a member of the Midwest Intercollegiate Football Conference (MIFC) during the 1991 NCAA Division II football season. In their sixth season under head coach Keith Otterbein, the Bulldogs compiled a 5–6 record (5–6 in conference games), finished in a three-way tie for fourth place in the MIFC, and were outscored by a total of 218 to 174.

=== Schedule ===
| Date | Opponent | Site | Result | Attendance | Source |
|---|---|---|---|---|---|
| September 7 | Michigan Tech* | Top Taggart Field; Big Rapids, MI | L 13–33 | | |
| September 14 | Ashland | Top Taggart Field; Big Rapids, MI | L 7–35 | | |
| September 21 | at Hillsdale | Hillsdale, MI | W 23–16 | | |
| September 28 | Wayne State (MI) | Top Taggart Field; Big Rapids, MI | L 24–27 | | |
| October 5 | at Northern Michigan | Superior Dome; Marquette, MI | L 17–27 | | |
| October 12 | Valparaiso | Top Taggart Field; Big Rapids, MI | W 28–9 | | |
| October 19 | Grand Valley State | Top Taggart Field; Big Rapids, MI (Anchor–Bone Classic) | L 6–28 | 1,950 | |
| October 26 | at Butler | Indianapolis, IN | W 7–6 | | |
| November 2 | Indianapolis | Top Taggart Field; Big Rapids, MI | W 21–6 | | |
| November 9 | at Saginaw Valley State | Wickes Stadium; University Center, MI | W 18–15 | | |
| November 16 | at Saint Joseph's (IN) | Rensselaer, IN | L 10–16 | | |
*Non-conference game

== 1992 ==
1992 Ferris State Bulldogs football

MIFC co-champion

NCAA Division II quarterfinal, L 13–35 at New Haven
- Conference: Midwest Intercollegiate Football Conference
- Record: 10–3 (8–2 MIFC)
- Head coach: Keith Otterbein (7th season)
- Home stadium: Top Taggart Field

1992 Midwest Intercollegiate Football Conference standings
| | Conf. | | | | | Overall |
| Team | W | | L | | T | W | | L | | T |
|---|---|---|---|---|---|---|---|---|---|---|
| Hillsdale + | 8 | – | 2 | – | 0 | 9 | – | 2 | – | 0 |
| Ferris State +^ | 8 | – | 2 | – | 0 | 10 | – | 3 | – | 0 |
| Butler + | 8 | – | 2 | – | 0 | 8 | – | 2 | – | 0 |
| Grand Valley State + | 8 | – | 2 | – | 0 | 8 | – | 3 | – | 0 |
| Ashland | 7 | – | 3 | – | 0 | 8 | – | 3 | – | 0 |
| Saginaw Valley State | 6 | – | 4 | – | 0 | 7 | – | 4 | – | 0 |
| Wayne State (MI) | 3 | – | 7 | – | 0 | 4 | – | 7 | – | 0 |
| Valparaiso | 3 | – | 7 | – | 0 | 3 | – | 8 | – | 0 |
| Indianapolis | 1 | – | 8 | – | 1 | 1 | – | 8 | – | 1 |
| Saint Joseph's (IN) | 1 | – | 8 | – | 1 | 1 | – | 8 | – | 1 |
| Northern Michigan | 1 | – | 9 | – | 0 | 1 | – | 9 | – | 0 |
+ – Conference co-champions; ^ – NCAA Division II playoff participant

The 1992 Ferris State Bulldogs football team represented Ferris State University (GVSU) as a member of the Midwest Intercollegiate Football Conference (MIFC) during the 1992 NCAA Division II football season. In their seventh season under head coach Keith Otterbein, the Bulldogs compiled a 10–3 record (8–2 in conference games), tied for the MIFC championship, and outscored opponents by a total of 308 to 165.

=== Schedule ===
| Date | Opponent | Site | Result | Attendance | Source |
|---|---|---|---|---|---|
| September 5 | vs. Northwood | Auburn, MI | W 33–10 | | |
| September 12 | at Ashland | Ashland, OH | L 7–15 | | |
| September 19 | Hillsdale | Top Taggart Field; Big Rapids, MI | L 14–36 | | |
| September 26 | at Wayne State (MI) | Detroit, MI | W 21–3 | | |
| October 3 | Northern Michigan | Top Taggart Field; Big Rapids, MI | W 23–12 | | |
| October 10 | at Valparaiso | Valparaiso, IN | W 33–3 | | |
| October 17 | at Grand Valley State | Lubbers Stadium; Allendale, MI (Anchor–Bone Classic) | W 23–0 | | |
| October 24 | Butler | Top Taggart Field; Big Rapids, MI | W 35–7 | | |
| October 31 | at Indianapolis | Indianapolis, IN | W 54–13 | | |
| November 7 | Saginaw Valley State | Top Taggart Field; Big Rapids, MI | W 10–9 | | |
| November 14 | Saint Joseph's | Top Taggart Field; Big Rapids, MI | W 23–7 | | |
| November 21 | Edinboro | Top Taggart Field; Big Rapids, MI (NCAA Division II first round) | W 19–15 | | |
| November 28 | at New Haven | New Haven, CT (NCAA Division II quarterfinal) | L 13–35 | | |

== 1993 ==
1993 Ferris State Bulldogs football

MIFC champion

NCAA Division II first round, L 21–28 at IUP
- Conference: Midwest Intercollegiate Football Conference
- Record: 9–1–2 (8–0–2 MIFC)
- Head coach: Keith Otterbein (8th season)
- Home stadium: Top Taggart Field

1993 Midwest Intercollegiate Football Conference standings
| | Conf. | | | | | Overall |
| Team | W | | L | | T | W | | L | | T |
|---|---|---|---|---|---|---|---|---|---|---|
| No. 10 Ferris State $^ | 8 | – | 0 | – | 2 | 9 | – | 1 | – | 2 |
| No. 15 Ashland | 8 | – | 2 | – | 0 | 9 | – | 2 | – | 0 |
| Grand Valley State | 6 | – | 2 | – | 2 | 6 | – | 3 | – | 2 |
| Hillsdale | 6 | – | 3 | – | 1 | 7 | – | 3 | – | 1 |
| Northern Michigan | 5 | – | 4 | – | 1 | 5 | – | 4 | – | 1 |
| Wayne State (MI) | 5 | – | 5 | – | 0 | 6 | – | 5 | – | 0 |
| St. Francis (IL) | 5 | – | 5 | – | 0 | 5 | – | 6 | – | 0 |
| Saginaw Valley State | 4 | – | 6 | – | 0 | 4 | – | 7 | – | 0 |
| Northwood | 2 | – | 7 | – | 1 | 3 | – | 7 | – | 1 |
| Saint Joseph's (IN) | 1 | – | 8 | – | 1 | 1 | – | 8 | – | 1 |
| Indianapolis | 1 | – | 9 | – | 0 | 2 | – | 9 | – | 0 |
$ – Conference champion; ^ – NCAA Division II playoff participant; Rankings from NCAA Division II Football Committee poll

The 1993 Ferris State Bulldogs football team represented Ferris State University (GVSU) as a member of the Midwest Intercollegiate Football Conference (MIFC) during the 1993 NCAA Division II football season. In their eighth season under head coach Keith Otterbein, the Bulldogs compiled a 9–1–2 record (8–0–2 in conference games), won the MIFC championship, and outscored opponents by a total of 359 to 159.

=== Schedule ===
| Date | Opponent | Site | Result | Attendance | Source |
|---|---|---|---|---|---|
| September 4 | at Edinboro* | Edinboro, PA | W 23–9 | | |
| September 11 | Ashland | Top Taggart Field; Big Rapids, MI | W 20–6 | | |
| September 18 | at Hillsdale | Hillsdale, MI | T 13–13 | | |
| September 25 | Wayne State (MI) | Top Taggart Field; Big Rapids, MI | W 36–6 | | |
| October 2 | at Northern Michigan | Marquette, MI | W 47–0 | | |
| October 9 | Saint Francis (IL) | Top Taggart Field; Big Rapids, MI | W 26–18 | | |
| October 16 | Grand Valley State | Top Taggart Field; Big Rapids, MI (Anchor–Bone Classic) | T 17–17 | | |
| October 23 | at Northwood | Midland, MI | W 47–0 | | |
| October 30 | Indianapolis | Top Taggart Field; Big Rapids, MI | W 40–26 | | |
| November 6 | at Saginaw Valley State | Wickes Stadium; University Center, MI | W 34–23 | | |
| November 13 | at Saint Joseph's (IN) | Rensselaer, IN | W 35–13 | | |
| November 20 | at IUP* | Indiana, PA (NCAA Division II first round) | L 21–28 | | |
*Non-conference game

== 1994 ==
1994 Ferris State Bulldogs football

MIFC champion

NCAA Division II quarterfinal, L 17–21 at IUP
- Conference: Midwest Intercollegiate Football Conference
- Record: 11–1 (10–0 MIFC)
- Head coach: Keith Otterbein (9th season)
- Home stadium: Top Taggart Field

1994 Midwest Intercollegiate Football Conference standings
| | Conf. | | | | | Overall |
| Team | W | | L | | T | W | | L | | T |
|---|---|---|---|---|---|---|---|---|---|---|
| No. 5 Ferris State $^ | 10 | – | 0 | – | 0 | 11 | – | 1 | – | 0 |
| No. 18 Grand Valley State ^ | 8 | – | 2 | – | 0 | 8 | – | 4 | – | 0 |
| Hillsdale | 7 | – | 3 | – | 0 | 7 | – | 4 | – | 0 |
| Ashland | 6 | – | 4 | – | 0 | 6 | – | 4 | – | 0 |
| Saginaw Valley State | 6 | – | 4 | – | 0 | 6 | – | 4 | – | 0 |
| Wayne State (MI) | 6 | – | 4 | – | 0 | 6 | – | 5 | – | 0 |
| Northern Michigan | 5 | – | 5 | – | 0 | 5 | – | 5 | – | 0 |
| Michigan Tech | 3 | – | 7 | – | 0 | 4 | – | 7 | – | 0 |
| Saint Joseph's (IN) | 3 | – | 7 | – | 0 | 4 | – | 7 | – | 0 |
| Indianapolis | 2 | – | 7 | – | 1 | 2 | – | 7 | – | 1 |
| Northwood | 2 | – | 7 | – | 1 | 2 | – | 7 | – | 1 |
| St. Francis (IL) | 1 | – | 9 | – | 0 | 1 | – | 10 | – | 0 |
$ – Conference champion; ^ – NCAA Division II playoff participant; Rankings from NCAA Division II Football Committee poll

The 1994 Ferris State Bulldogs football team represented Ferris State University (GVSU) as a member of the Midwest Intercollegiate Football Conference (MIFC) during the 1994 NCAA Division II football season. In their ninth season under head coach Keith Otterbein, the Bulldogs compiled an 11–1 record (10–0 in conference games), won the MIFC championship, and outscored opponents by a total of 365 to 218. They advanced to the NCAA Division II playoffs where they defeated West Chester in the first round before losing to IUP in the quarterfinals.

=== Schedule ===
| Date | Opponent | Site | Result | Attendance | Source |
|---|---|---|---|---|---|
| September 10 | at Ashland | Ashland, OH | W 16–14 | | |
| September 17 | Indianapolis | Top Taggart Field; Big Rapids, MI | W 44–7 | | |
| September 24 | Hillsdale | Top Taggart Field; Big Rapids, MI | W 14–10 | | |
| October 1 | at Grand Valley State | Lubbers Stadium; Allendale, MI (Anchor–Bone Classic) | W 27–21 | | |
| October 8 | Northern Michigan | Top Taggart Field; Big Rapids, MI | W 41–21 | | |
| October 15 | at Wayne State (MI) | Detroit, MI | W 34–14 | | |
| October 22 | Northwood | Top Taggart Field; Big Rapids, MI | W 52–16 | | |
| October 29 | at Michigan Tech | Houghton, MI | W 30–19 | | |
| November 5 | Saint Joseph's (IN) | Top Taggart Field; Big Rapids, MI | W 17–7 | | |
| November 12 | at Saginaw Valley State | University Center, MI | W 30–28 | | |
| November 19 | West Chester | Top Taggart Field; Big Rapids, MI (NCAA Division II first round) | W 43–40 | | |
| November 26 | IUP | Top Taggart Field; Big Rapids, MI (NCAA Division II quarterfinal) | L 17–21 | | |

== 1995 ==
1995 Ferris State Bulldogs football

MIFC champion

NCAA Division II semifinal, L 7–45 at North Alabama
- Conference: Midwest Intercollegiate Football Conference
- Record: 12–1 (10–0 MIFC)
- Head coach: Jeff Pierce (1st season)

1995 Midwest Intercollegiate Football Conference standings
| | Conf. | | | | | Overall |
| Team | W | | L | | T | W | | L | | T |
|---|---|---|---|---|---|---|---|---|---|---|
| No. 3 Ferris State $^ | 10 | – | 0 | – | 0 | 12 | – | 1 | – | 0 |
| Grand Valley State | 8 | – | 2 | – | 0 | 8 | – | 3 | – | 0 |
| Northern Michigan | 7 | – | 3 | – | 0 | 7 | – | 3 | – | 0 |
| Saginaw Valley State | 7 | – | 3 | – | 0 | 7 | – | 3 | – | 0 |
| Hillsdale | 7 | – | 3 | – | 0 | 7 | – | 4 | – | 0 |
| Michigan Tech | 5 | – | 5 | – | 0 | 5 | – | 5 | – | 0 |
| St. Francis (IL) | 5 | – | 5 | – | 0 | 5 | – | 6 | – | 0 |
| Indianapolis | 3 | – | 7 | – | 0 | 3 | – | 8 | – | 0 |
| Wayne State (MI) | 3 | – | 7 | – | 0 | 3 | – | 8 | – | 0 |
| Ashland | 2 | – | 8 | – | 0 | 2 | – | 8 | – | 0 |
| Northwood | 2 | – | 8 | – | 0 | 2 | – | 8 | – | 0 |
| Saint Joseph's (IN) | 1 | – | 9 | – | 0 | 1 | – | 9 | – | 0 |
$ – Conference champion; ^ – NCAA Division II playoff participant; Rankings from NCAA Division II Football Committee poll

The 1995 Ferris State Bulldogs football team was an American football team that represented Ferris State University as a member of the Midwest Intercollegiate Football Conference (MIFC) during the 1995 NCAA Division II football season. In their first year under head coach Jeff Pierce, the Bulldogs compiled a 10–0 record in the regular season. They defeated Millersville and New Haven in the first and second rounds of the NCAA Division II playoffs, ultimately losing to national champion North Alabama in the semifinals.

=== Schedule ===
| Date | Opponent | Rank | Site | Result | Attendance | Source |
|---|---|---|---|---|---|---|
| September 9 | Ashland | No. 9 | Top Taggart Field; Big Rapids, MI | W 20–13 | | |
| September 16 | at Indianapolis | No. 4 | Indianapolis, IN | W 50–0 | | |
| September 23 | at Hillsdale | No. 4 | Hillsdale, MI | W 17–10 | | |
| September 30 | No. 12 Grand Valley State | No. 5 | Top Taggart Field; Big Rapids, MI (Anchor–Bone Classic) | W 30–21 | | |
| October 7 | at Northern Michigan | No. 5 | Marquette, MI | W 41–27 | | |
| October 14 | Wayne State (MI)^{†} | No. 4 | Top Taggart Field; Big Rapids, MI | W 39–30 | | |
| October 21 | at Northwood | No. 4 | Midland, MI | W 56–14 | | |
| October 28 | Michigan Tech | No. 3 | Top Taggart Field; Big Rapids, MI | W 38–17 | | |
| November 4 | at Saint Joseph's (IN) | No. 3 | Rensselaer, IN | W 43–26 | | |
| November 11 | Saginaw Valley State | No. 3 | Top Taggart Field; Big Rapids, MI | W 46–42 | | |
| November 18 | No. 14 Millersville* | No. 3 | Top Taggart Field; Big Rapids, MI (NCAA Division II first round) | W 36–26 | | |
| November 25 | No. 5 New Haven* | No. 3 | Top Taggart Field; Big Rapids, MI (NCAA Division II quarterfinal) | W 17–9 | | |
| December 2 | at No. 1 North Alabama* | No. 3 | Florence, AL (NCAA Division II semifinal) | L 7–45 | 7,866 | |
*Non-conference game; ^{†}Homecoming; Rankings from NCAA Division II Football Committee Poll released prior to the game

== 1996 ==
1996 Ferris State Bulldogs football

MIFC champion

NCAA Division II quarterfinal, L 21–23 vs. Clarion
- Conference: Midwest Intercollegiate Football Conference
- Record: 10–2 (9–1 MIFC)
- Head coach: Jeff Pierce (2nd season)

1996 Midwest Intercollegiate Football Conference standings
| | Conf. | | | Overall |
| Team | W | | L | W | | L |
|---|---|---|---|---|---|---|
| No. 3 Ferris State $^ | 9 | – | 1 | 10 | – | 2 |
| Grand Valley State | 8 | – | 2 | 8 | – | 3 |
| Northern Michigan | 7 | – | 3 | 7 | – | 3 |
| No. 20 Saginaw Valley State | 7 | – | 3 | 7 | – | 3 |
| Hillsdale | 6 | – | 4 | 6 | – | 5 |
| Northwood | 5 | – | 5 | 6 | – | 5 |
| Ashland | 4 | – | 6 | 4 | – | 7 |
| Indianapolis | 3 | – | 7 | 4 | – | 7 |
| St. Francis (IL) | 2 | – | 8 | 3 | – | 8 |
| Michigan Tech | 2 | – | 8 | 2 | – | 8 |
| Wayne State (MI) | 2 | – | 8 | 2 | – | 9 |
$ – Conference champion; ^ – NCAA Division II playoff participant; Rankings from NCAA Division II Football Committee poll

The 1996 Ferris State Bulldogs football team was an American football team that represented Ferris State University as a member of the Midwest Intercollegiate Football Conference (MIFC) during the 1996 NCAA Division II football season. In their second year under head coach Jeff Pierce, the Bulldogs compiled a 10–2 record (9–1 in conference games), won the MIFC championship, and outscored opponents by a total of 334 to 209. They defeated IUP in the first round of the NCAA Division II playoffs, ultimately losing to Clarion in the quarterfinals.

=== Schedule ===
| Date | Opponent | Site | Result | Attendance | Source |
|---|---|---|---|---|---|
| August 29 | at Ashland | Ashland, OH | W 26–0 | | |
| September 7 | Indianapolis | Big Rapids, MI | W 30–19 | | |
| September 14 | Hillsdale | Big Rapids, MI | W 20–7 | | |
| September 21 | at Grand Valley State | Allendale, MI | L 17–36 | | |
| September 28 | Northern Michigan | Big Rapids, MI | W 38–33 | | |
| October 5 | at Wayne State (MI) | Detroit, MI | W 26–7 | | |
| October 12 | Northwood | Big Rapids, MI | W 40–24 | | |
| October 19 | at Michigan Tech | Houghton, MI | W 31–6 | | |
| November 2 | at Saginaw Valley State | University Center, MI | W 26–17 | | |
| November 9 | at St. Francis (IL) | Joliet, IL | W 35–14 | | |
| November 23 | IUP* | Top Taggart Field; Big Rapids, MI (NCAA Division II first round) | W 24–23 | | |
| November 30 | Clarion* | Top Taggart Field; Big Rapids, MI (NCAA Division II quarterfinal) | L 21–23 | | |
*Non-conference game

== 1997 ==
1997 Ferris State Bulldogs football
- Conference: Midwest Intercollegiate Football Conference
- Record: 3–7 (3–7 MIFC)
- Head coach: Jeff Pierce (3rd season)

1997 Midwest Intercollegiate Football Conference standings
| | Conf. | | | Overall |
| Team | W | | L | W | | L |
|---|---|---|---|---|---|---|
| No. 12 Ashland +^ | 9 | – | 1 | 9 | – | 2 |
| Grand Valley State + | 9 | – | 1 | 9 | – | 1 |
| Saginaw Valley State | 8 | – | 2 | 9 | – | 2 |
| Indianapolis | 7 | – | 3 | 8 | – | 3 |
| Northern Michigan | 6 | – | 4 | 7 | – | 4 |
| Hillsdale | 4 | – | 6 | 4 | – | 7 |
| Ferris State | 3 | – | 7 | 3 | – | 7 |
| Northwood | 3 | – | 7 | 3 | – | 7 |
| Wayne State (MI) | 3 | – | 7 | 3 | – | 8 |
| Michigan Tech | 2 | – | 8 | 2 | – | 8 |
| St. Francis (IL) | 1 | – | 9 | 1 | – | 9 |
+ – Conference co-champions; ^ – NCAA Division II playoff participant; Rankings from NCAA Division II Football Committee poll

The 1997 Ferris State Bulldogs football team was an American football team that represented Ferris State University as a member of the Midwest Intercollegiate Football Conference (MIFC) during the 1997 NCAA Division II football season. In their third year under head coach Jeff Pierce, the Bulldogs compiled a 3–7 record (3–7 in conference games), finished in a three-way tie for seventh place in the GLIAC, and were outscored by a total of 243 to 222.

=== Schedule ===
| Date | Opponent | Site | Result | Attendance | Source |
|---|---|---|---|---|---|
| August 28 | Ashland | Top Taggart Field; Big Rapids, MI | L 7–26 | | |
| September 6 | at Indianapolis | Indianapolis, IN | L 21–32 | | |
| September 13 | at Hillsdale | Frank "Muddy" Waters Stadium; Hillsdale, MI | W 35–21 | | |
| September 20 | Grand Valley State | Top Taggart Field; Big Rapids, MI (Anchor–Bone Classic) | L 18–21 | 6,619 | |
| September 27 | at Northern Michigan | Marquette, MI | L 21–23 | | |
| October 4 | Wayne State (MI) | Top Taggart Field; Big Rapids, MI | L 26–30 | | |
| October 11 | at Northwood | Hantz Stadium; Midland, MI | W 31–17 | | |
| October 18 | Michigan Tech | Top Taggart Field; Big Rapids, MI | L 24–34 | | |
| November 1 | Saginaw Valley State | Top Taggart Field; Big Rapids, MI | W 24–23 | | |
| November 8 | St. Francis (IL) | Top Taggart Field; Big Rapids, MI | L 15–16 | | |

== 1998 ==
1998 Ferris State Bulldogs football
- Conference: Midwest Intercollegiate Football Conference
- Record: 5–6 (5–5 MIFC)
- Head coach: Jeff Pierce (4th season)

1998 Midwest Intercollegiate Football Conference standings
| | Conf. | | | Overall |
| Team | W | | L | W | | L |
|---|---|---|---|---|---|---|
| No. 14 Grand Valley State $^ | 9 | – | 1 | 9 | – | 3 |
| Saginaw Valley State | 8 | – | 2 | 9 | – | 2 |
| Indianapolis | 8 | – | 2 | 8 | – | 2 |
| Ashland | 7 | – | 3 | 7 | – | 3 |
| Northwood | 7 | – | 3 | 7 | – | 3 |
| Findlay | 5 | – | 5 | 5 | – | 5 |
| Mercyhurst | 5 | – | 5 | 5 | – | 5 |
| Ferris State | 5 | – | 5 | 5 | – | 6 |
| Northern Michigan | 4 | – | 5 | 5 | – | 5 |
| Michigan Tech | 4 | – | 6 | 4 | – | 6 |
| Hillsdale | 3 | – | 7 | 3 | – | 8 |
| Westminster (PA) | 2 | – | 7 | 3 | – | 7 |
| Wayne State (MI) | 2 | – | 8 | 2 | – | 9 |
| St. Francis (IL) | 0 | – | 10 | 0 | – | 11 |
$ – Conference champion; ^ – NCAA Division II playoff participant; Rankings from NCAA Division II Football Committee poll

The 1998 Ferris State Bulldogs football team was an American football team that represented Ferris State University as a member of the Midwest Intercollegiate Football Conference (MIFC) during the 1998 NCAA Division II football season. In their fourth year under head coach Jeff Pierce, the Bulldogs compiled a 5–6 record (5–5 in conference games), finished in a three-way tie for sixth in the GLIAC, and outscored opponents by a total of 355 to 346.

=== Schedule ===
| Date | Opponent | Site | Result | Attendance | Source |
|---|---|---|---|---|---|
| September 5 | at Winona State* | Winona, MN | L 10–17 | | |
| September 12 | Saginaw Valley State | Top Taggart Field; Big Rapids, MI | L 20–34 | | |
| September 19 | at Findlay | Findlay, OH | L 7–24 | | |
| September 26 | at Northwood | Midland, MI | L 21–35 | | |
| October 3 | Northern Michigan | Top Taggart Field; Big Rapids, MI | W 29–19 | | |
| October 10 | Wayne State (MI) | Top Taggart Field; Big Rapids, MI | W 37–13 | | |
| October 17 | at Ashland | Ashland, OH | L 37–59 | | |
| October 24 | at Michigan Tech | Houghton, MI | W 67–46 | | |
| October 31 | Hillsdale | Top Taggart Field; Big Rapids, MI | W 24–21 | | |
| November 7 | at St. Francis (IL) | Joliet, IL | W 50–22 | | |
| November 14 | Grand Valley State | Top Taggart Field; Big Rapids, MI (Anchor–Bone Classic) | L 53–56 | | |
*Non-conference game

== 1999 ==
1999 Ferris State Bulldogs football

GLIAC co-champion
- Conference: Great Lakes Intercollegiate Athletic Conference
- Record: 7–3 (7–2 GLIAC)
- Head coach: Jeff Pierce (5th season)

1999 Great Lakes Intercollegiate Athletic Conference football standings
| | Conf. | | | Overall |
| Team | W | | L | W | | L |
|---|---|---|---|---|---|---|
| No. 10 Northwood + | 7 | – | 2 | 8 | – | 2 |
| Ferris State + | 7 | – | 2 | 7 | – | 3 |
| Ashland | 7 | – | 3 | 7 | – | 3 |
| Hillsdale | 6 | – | 3 | 8 | – | 3 |
| Northern Michigan | 6 | – | 3 | 6 | – | 4 |
| Michigan Tech | 6 | – | 4 | 6 | – | 4 |
| Indianapolis | 5 | – | 4 | 7 | – | 4 |
| Grand Valley State | 5 | – | 4 | 5 | – | 5 |
| Mercyhurst | 4 | – | 5 | 5 | – | 5 |
| Saginaw Valley State | 4 | – | 5 | 4 | – | 6 |
| Westminster (PA) | 2 | – | 8 | 3 | – | 8 |
| Findlay | 2 | – | 8 | 2 | – | 8 |
| Wayne State (MI) | 0 | – | 10 | 0 | – | 11 |
+ – Conference co-champions; Rankings from NCAA Division II Football Committee poll

The 1999 Ferris State Bulldogs football team was an American football team that represented Ferris State University as a member of the Great Lakes Intercollegiate Athletic Conference (GLIAC) during the 1999 NCAA Division II football season. In their fifth year under head coach Jeff Pierce, the Bulldogs compiled a 7–3 record (7–2 in conference games), tied with Northwood for the GLIAC championship, and outscored opponents by a total of 473 to 262.

=== Schedule ===
| Date | Opponent | Site | Result | Attendance | Source |
|---|---|---|---|---|---|
| September 2 | at North Dakota State* | Fargodome; Fargo, ND | L 35–55 | | |
| September 11 | at Saginaw Valley State | Wickes Stadium; University Center, MI | W 56–14 | | |
| September 18 | Findlay | Big Rapids, MI | W 56–14 | | |
| September 25 | Northwood | Big Rapids, MI | W 46–36 | | |
| October 2 | at Northern Michigan | Marquette, MI | W 45–27 | | |
| October 9 | at Wayne State (MI) | Detroit, MI | W 62–20 | | |
| October 16 | Ashland | Big Rapids, MI | L 22–26 | | |
| October 23 | Michigan Tech | Big Rapids, MI | W 66–7 | | |
| October 30 | at Hillsdale | Hillsdale, MI | L 37–40 | | |
| November 13 | at Grand Valley State | Lubbers Stadium; Allendale, MI (Anchor–Bone Classic) | W 48–23 | 5,277 | |
*Non-conference game
