= Ost (surname) =

Ost is a Germanic surname. Notable people with the surname include:

- Alfred Ost (1884–1945), Belgian artist
- Daniel Ost (born 1955), Belgian artist known for his work with plants
- Louis Ost (1893–1960), American college football coach
- Valerie Van Ost (1944–2019), English actress
