= William Rennie =

William Rennie may refer to:

- William Rennie (Victoria Cross) (1822–1887), Scottish recipient of the Victoria Cross
- William Rennie (horticulturist) (1835–1910), scientific farmer and seed merchant in Ontario
- Willie Rennie (William Cowan Rennie, born 1967), Scottish politician
- William J. Rennie (1891–1964), American football and basketball coach
- William Hepburn Rennie, British colonial official in Hong Kong and St. Vincent
