= Elroy Guckert =

American college football coach (1900–1940)

Biographical details
- Born: May 17, 1900; Sandusky, Ohio, U.S.
- Died: September 3, 1940 (aged 40) (disappeared)

Playing career

Football
- 1920–1921: Denison

Basketball
- 1920–1921: Denison

Baseball
- c. 1920–1921: Denison
- Positions: Back (football); First baseman (baseball)

Coaching career (HC unless noted)

Football
- 1924: Grand Rapids South HS (MI)
- 1925–1926: Hillsdale

Basketball
- 1924–1925: Grand Rapids South HS (MI)
- 1925–1926: Hillsdale

Baseball
- 1926: Hillsdale

Administrative career (AD unless noted)
- 1925–1927: Hillsdale

Head coaching record
- Overall: 8–6–2 (college football); 5–9 (college basketball)

Elroy Simon "Guck" Guckert (May 17, 1900 – September 3, 1940) was an American football, basketball, and baseball coach, college athletics administrator, and professor. He served as the head football coach at Hillsdale College in Hillsdale, Michigan from 1925 to 1926, compiling a record of 8–6–2. He was head basketball coach at Hillsdale for the 1925–26 season, tallying a mark of 5–9. Guckert was also Hilldale's athletic director and a professor of economics before leaving the school in February 1927 to attend Columbia University.

A native of Sandusky, Ohio, Guckert attended Denison University in Granville, Ohio, where he played football as a back and baseball as a first baseman. He coached football and basketball at Grand Rapids South High School in Grand Rapids, Michigan before succeeding fellow Denison alumnus Howard B. Jefferson as coach as Hillsdale in 1925.

== Disappearance ==
Guckert is said to have died when he disappeared from a ship in 1940. However, his body was never recovered and he was never seen again, so his fate is unknown.

== Head coaching record ==
=== College football ===
Year	Team	Overall	Conference	Standing	Bowl/playoffs
Hillsdale Dales (Michigan Intercollegiate Athletic Association) (1925–1926)
1925	Hillsdale	3–4–1	2–3	T–4th	
1926	Hillsdale	5–2–1	2–2	T–2nd	
Hillsdale:		8–6–2	4–5		
Total:		8–6–2			

== See also ==
- List of people who disappeared mysteriously at sea
