= Steve Olson (American football) =

American football coach and college athletics administrator

Current position
- Title: Assistant AD
- Team: Valley City State
- Conference: NSAA

Biographical details
- Born: c. 1966 (age 59–60)
- Education: Valley City State University (B.S., 1988)

Coaching career (HC unless noted)

Football
- 1991: Northern State (assistant)
- 1992–1999: Jamestown (assistant)
- 2000–2011: Minnesota–Crookston (assistant)
- 2012–2016: Michigan Tech (DC/LB)
- 2017–2022: Michigan Tech

Baseball
- 1992–1999: Jamestown
- 2000–2010: Minnesota–Crookston

Administrative career (AD unless noted)
- 2023–present: Valley City State (assistant AD / director for athletic development)

Head coaching record
- Overall: 23–29 (football)

Steven Olson is an American college athletics administrator and former football and baseball coach. He is currently the assistant athletic director and director for athletic development at Valley City State University (VCSU), a role he has held since June 2023. Olson is the former head football coach at Michigan Tech, leading the Huskies from 2017 to 2022 and compiling a record of 19–22. He has worked in collegiate athletics for more than 30 years, holding coaching and administrative roles across the Upper Midwest.

== Coaching career ==
=== Early careee ===
Olson began his coaching career at Northern State University in 1991 as an assistant coach for both the football and baseball programs. He then spent seven years at Jamestown College from 1992 to 1999, serving as an assistant football coach and the head baseball coach. During his tenure, the Jamestown football program reached the 1998 NAIA national playoffs.

=== Minnesota–Crookston ===
From 2000 to 2011, Olson worked on the football coaching staff at the University of Minnesota–Crookston while also serving as head baseball coach for 10 seasons.

=== Michigan Tech ===
Olson joined Michigan Tech in 2012 as the linebackers coach and was promoted to defensive coordinator in 2013. His defenses consistently ranked among the top units in the GLIAC in scoring and total defense.

Olson was named the 16th head football coach at Michigan Tech on November 15, 2016. He led the Huskies from 2017 through the 2022 season, guiding the program to a series of competitive campaigns in the GLIAC. His tenure included multiple winning seasons, four victories in the rivalry Miner’s Cup series against Northern Michigan, and a 6–4 finish in 2021 that placed Michigan Tech third in the conference standings.

== Administrative career ==
=== Valley City State ===
On June 28, 2023, Olson returned to his alma mater when VCSU announced his hiring as Director for Athletic Development and Game Management and Assistant Athletic Director. His responsibilities include overseeing athletic fundraising and donor relations, managing game-day operations and promotional activities, and supporting departmental planning under Athletic Director Dennis McCulloch.

== Personal life ==
Olson graduated from Valley City State University in 1988 with a degree in biology education and physical education. A standout baseball player, he earned NAIA Honorable Mention All-America honors in 1988 and helped VCSU win the 1987 district championship. He was inducted into the VCSU Athletic Hall of Fame in 2005.

== Head coaching record ==
=== Football ===
Year	Team	Overall	Conference	Standing	Bowl/playoffs
Michigan Tech Huskies (Great Lakes Intercollegiate Athletic Conference) (2017–2022)
2017	Michigan Tech	4–7	3–6	T–7th	
2018	Michigan Tech	4–6	2–6	7th	
2019	Michigan Tech	5–5	3–5	T–5th	
2020–21	No team—COVID-19				
2021	Michigan Tech	6–4	5–2	3rd	
2022	Michigan Tech	4–7	2–4	5th	
Michigan tech:		23–29	15–23		
Total:					
