= Lawrence Mason =

American football and basketball coach

Biographical details
- Born: March 19, 1892; Croswell, Michigan, U.S.
- Died: January 1, 1972 (aged 79); Kalamazoo, Michigan, U.S.

Coaching career (HC unless noted)

Football
- 1918: Hillsdale

Basketball
- 1918–1919: Hillsdale

Head coaching record
- Overall: 1–5 (football); 3–7 (basketball)

Lawrence Albro Mason (March 19, 1892 – January 1, 1972) was an American football and basketball coach. He served as the head football coach at Hillsdale College in Hillsdale, Michigan in 1918, compiling a record of 1–5. Mason was also the head basketball coach at Hillsdale for one season, in 1918–19, tallying a mark of 3–7.
