= Samuel Taylor (American football) =

American football and basketball coach

Coaching career (HC unless noted)

Football
- 1919: Hillsdale

Basketball
- 1919–1920: Hillsdale

Head coaching record
- Overall: 3–4 (football); 10–4 (basketball)

Samuel Taylor was an American football and basketball coach. He served as the head football coach at Hillsdale College in Hillsdale, Michigan in 1919, compiling a record of 3–4. Taylor was also the head basketball coach at Hillsdale for one season, in 1919–20, tallying a mark of 10–4.
