= Henry Fallon =

American football and basketball coach

Coaching career (HC unless noted)

Football
- 1952: Hillsdale

Basketball
- 1952–1953: Hillsdale

Head coaching record
- Overall: 3–5 (football); 2–15 (basketball)

Henry W. Fallon was an American football and basketball coach. He served as the head football coach at Hillsdale College in Hillsdale, Michigan for one season, in 1952, compiling a record of 3–5. Fallon was also the head basketball coach at Hillsdale for one season, in 1952–53, tallying a mark of 2–15.

== Head coaching record ==
=== Football ===
Year	Team	Overall	Conference	Standing	Bowl/playoffs
Hillsdale Dales (Michigan Intercollegiate Athletic Association) (1952)
1952	Hillsdale	3–5	1–4	T–5th	
Hillsdale:		3–5	1–4		
Total:		3–5			
