= Leroy Buchiet =

American football and basketball coach (1892–1952)

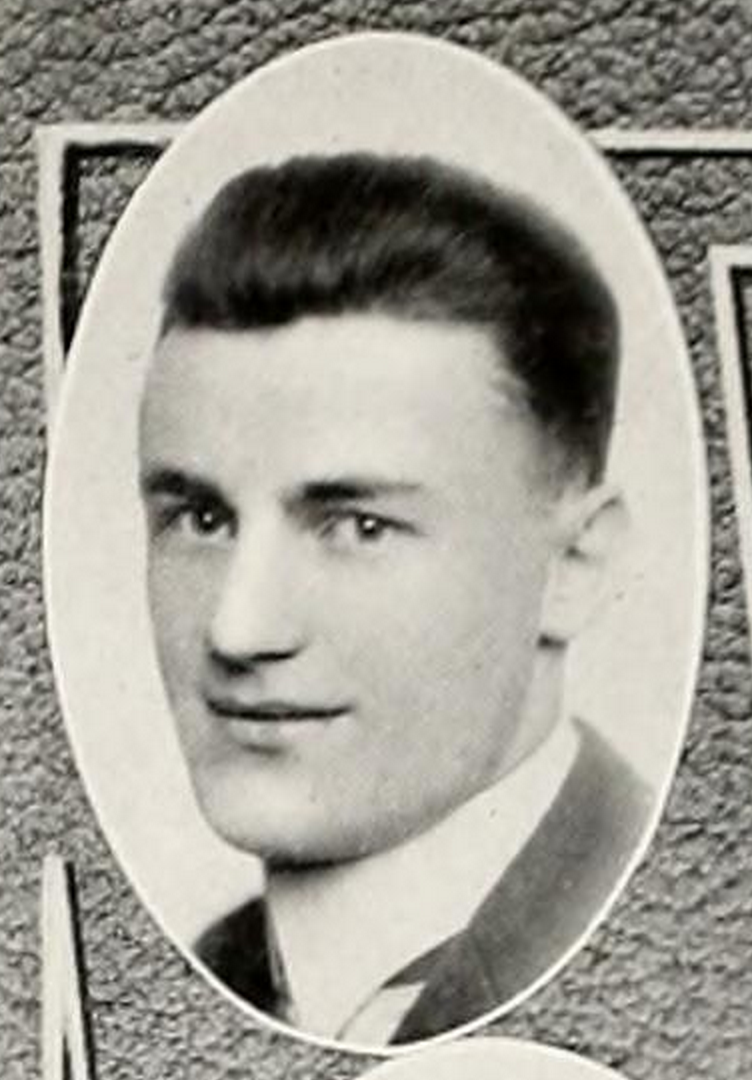
- Buchiet at Lake Forest c. 1914

Biographical details
- Born: June 12, 1892; Beardstown, Illinois, U.S.
- Died: March 7, 1952 (aged 59); Greencastle, Indiana, U.S.

Playing career

Football
- 1912–1913: Lake Forest

Basketball
- 1913–1914: Lake Forest
- Position: Quarterback

Coaching career (HC unless noted)

Football
- 1914–1917: Hillsdale

Basketball
- 1914–1918: Hillsdale

Baseball
- 1915: Hillsdale

Head coaching record
- Overall: 9–13–3 (football); 18–28 (basketball); 4–7 (baseball)

Accomplishments and honors

Championships
- Football; 1 MIAA (1914)

Leroy Charles Buchiet (June 12, 1892 – March 7, 1952) was an American football, basketball, and baseball coach. He served as the head football coach for the Hillsdale College in Hillsdale, Michigan for four seasons, from 1914 until 1917, compiling a record of 9–13–3. Buchiet was also the head basketball coach at Hillsdale from 1914 to 1918, tallying a mark of 18–28 He played football and basketball and ran track at Lake Forest College.

== Head coaching record ==
=== Football ===
Year	Team	Overall	Conference	Standing	Bowl/playoffs
Hillsdale Dales (Michigan Intercollegiate Athletic Association) (1914–1917)
1914	Hillsdale	3–3–1	3–1	T–1st	
1915	Hillsdale	3–3–1	1–3–1	5th	
1916	Hillsdale	3–2–1	1–2–1		
1917	Hillsdale	0–5	0–4	T–5th	
Hillsdale:		9–13–3	5–10–2		
Total:		9–13–3			
National championship Conference title Conference division title or championship game berth
