= Howard B. Jefferson =

Biographical details
- Born: September 28, 1901; Norwalk, Ohio, U.S.
- Died: October 1, 1983 (aged 82); Worcester, Massachusetts, U.S.

Playing career

Football
- 1920–1922: Denison

Basketball
- 1920–1923: Denison
- Positions: End; Guard (basketball)

Coaching career (HC unless noted)

Football
- 1923–1924: Hillsdale

Basketball
- 1923–1925: Hillsdale

Administrative career (AD unless noted)
- 1923–1925: Hillsdale

Head coaching record
- Overall: 9–5–2 (football); 12–19 (basketball)

Accomplishments and honors

Championships
- Football; 1 MIAA (1924)

Howard Bonar Jefferson (September 28, 1901 – October 1, 1983) was an American football and basketball coach, college athletics administrator, professor, and university president. He served as the head football coach at Hillsdale College in Hillsdale, Michigan from 1923 to 1924, compiling a record of 9–5–2. Jefferson was also the head basketball coach at Hillsdale from 1923 to 1925, tallying mark of 12–19.

Jefferson attended Denison University in Granville, Ohio, where he played football as an end and basketball guard and earned All-Ohio honors in both sports. He graduated from Denison in 1923 and received a Doctor of Philosophy degree from Yale University in 1929. Denison joined the faculty of the Philosophy Department at Colgate University in Hamilton, New York in 1929. From 1943 to 1945, he was the school's assistant dean and acting director of admissions and then director of Colgate's School of Philosophy and Religion in 1945–46. From 1946 to 1967, Jefferson served as the president of Clark University in Worcester, Massachusetts. He died on October 1, 1983, at City Hospital in Worcester.

Jefferson is a member of the Norwalk, Ohio Hall of Fame.

== Head coaching record ==
=== Football ===
Year	Team	Overall	Conference	Standing	Bowl/playoffs
Hillsdale Dales (Michigan Intercollegiate Athletic Association) (1923–1924)
1923	Hillsdale	3–4–1	1–3–1	T–4th	
1924	Hillsdale	6–1–1	5–0	1st	
Hillsdale:		9–5–2	6–3–1		
Total:		9–5–2			
National championship Conference title Conference division title or championship game berth
