= William J. Rennie =

American football and basketball coach, athletic administrator (1891–1964)

Biographical details
- Born: September 12, 1891; Holly, Michigan, U.S.
- Died: December 10, 1964 (aged 73); Hillsdale, Michigan, U.S.

Playing career

Football
- 1912–1914: Hillsdale

Basketball
- c. 1914: Hillsdale

Baseball
- c. 1914: Hillsdale
- Positions: Tackle, center (football)

Coaching career (HC unless noted)

Football
- 1919: Waukegan HS (IL)
- 1920–1921: Hillsdale
- 1922: Illinois (assistant)
- 1922–1927: Muskogee Central HS (OK)

Basketball
- 1919–1920: Waukegan HS (IL)
- 1920–1922: Hillsdale

Baseball
- 1921: Hillsdale

Administrative career (AD unless noted)
- 1919–1920: Waukegan HS (IL)
- 1920–1922: Hillsdale

Head coaching record
- Overall: 11–4–1 (college football); 12–16 (college basketball); 2–3 (college baseball)

William J. "Big Bill" Rennie (September 12, 1891 – December 10, 1964) was an American football, basketball, and baseball coach and athletics administrator. Rennie served as the head football coach at Hillsdale College in Hillsdale, Michigan from 1920 and 1921, compiling a record of 11–4–1. Rennie was also the head basketball coach at Hillsdale from 1920 to 1922, tallying a mark of 12–16.

Rennie was born on September 12, 1891, in Holly, Michigan, to William and Marian Deller Rennie. He played college football at Hillsdale College as a tackle and center, and was elected captain of the 1914 team. Rennie also played basketball and baseball at Hillsdale before graduating in 1915. He then taught English and pursued graduate work at the University of Washington.

Rennie served as an officer in the United States Army during World War I. After being discharged from military service in December 1918, he was appointed athletic director at Waukegan High School in Waukegan, Illinois. There he coached football and basketball, leading his football squad to a record of 8–1 in the fall of 1919. In June 1919, Rennie briefly accepted a position as athletic director at Springfield High School in Springfield, Illinois, but then signed a contract to take on same role as his alma mater, Hillsdale College, several weeks later, in August of that year. In 1922, he pursued physical education work at the University of Illinois, and was a member of the university's coaching staff, assisting Robert Zuppke. On the recommendation of Illinois's athletic director, George Huff, Rennie was hired that fall as football coach by Central High School in Muskogee, Oklahoma. In, 1923, Rennie was offered the head coaching position at James Millikin University—now known as Millikin University—in Decatur, Illinois.

On August 12, 1920, Rennie married Elizabeth Adelaide Goodrich in Hillsdale. The two were both members of the Hillsdale College's class of 1915. Rennie was later regarded as an expert in fly fishing. He died on December 10, 1964, at the Hillsdale Community Health Center, following a long illness.

== Head coaching record ==
=== College football ===
Year	Team	Overall	Conference	Standing	Bowl/playoffs
Hillsdale Dales (Michigan Intercollegiate Athletic Association) (1920–1921)
1920	Hillsdale	6–1–1	2–1–1	3rd	
1921	Hillsdale	5–3	2–2	3rd	
Hillsdale:		11–4–1	4–3–1		
Total:		11–4–1			
