= Louis Ost =

American football coach

Biographical details
- Born: March 8, 1893; Newark, New Jersey, U.S.
- Died: July 11, 1960 (aged 68); Elizabeth, New Jersey, U.S.

Coaching career (HC unless noted)

Football
- 1922: Hillsdale

Basketball
- 1922–1923: Hillsdale

Head coaching record
- Overall: 3–5 (football); 7–13 (basketball)

Louis Ost Jr. (March 8, 1893 – July 11, 1960) was an American football coach. He served as the head football coach at Hillsdale College in Hillsdale, Michigan for one season, in 1922, compiling a record of 3–5. Ost was also the head basketball coach at Hillsdale for one season, in 1922–23, tallying a mark of 7–13.

Ost married Blossom Stewart on December 15, 1922, in Hillsdale. He died in 1960.

== Head coaching record ==
=== Football ===
Year	Team	Overall	Conference	Standing	Bowl/playoffs
Hillsdale Dales (Michigan Intercollegiate Athletic Association) (1922)
1922	Hillsdale	3–5	0–3	6th	
Hillsdale:		3–5	0–3		
Total:		3–5			
