= Keith Otterbein =

American football player and coach (born 1957)

Biographical details
- Born: May 19, 1957 (age 69)

Playing career
- 1975–1978: Hillpsdale
- Position: Linebacker

Coaching career (HC unless noted)
- 1979–1981: Hillsdale (assistant)
- 1982–1983: Central Michigan (assistant)
- 1984–1985: Ferris State (DC)
- 1986–1994: Ferris State
- 1995–2001: Ball State (RB)
- 2002–2023: Hillsdale

Head coaching record
- Overall: 192–147–3
- Bowls: 0–1
- Tournaments: 4–6 (NCAA D-II playoffs)

Accomplishments and honors

Championships
- 3 MIFC (1990–1992); 1 GLIAC (2011); 1 G-MAC (2018); 2 GLIAC South Division (2010–2011); 1 GLIAC North Division (2012)

Awards
- 2× MIFC Coach of the Year (1992, 1994); 2× GLIAC Coach of the Year (2009, 2011)

Keith Edward Otterbein (born May 19, 1957) is an American former college football coach. He served as the head football coach at Ferris State University in Big Rapids, Michigan from 1986 to 1994 and Hillsdale College in Hillsdale, Michigan from 2002 to 2023. Otterbein played at Hillsdale as a linebacker.

== Head coaching record ==
Year	Team	Overall	Conference	Standing	Bowl/playoffs
Ferris State Bulldogs (Great Lakes Intercollegiate Athletic Conference) (1986–1989)
1986	Ferris State	5–5	2–3	4th	
1987	Ferris State	4–7	2–3	T–3rd	
1988	Ferris State	4–7	1–4	5th	
1989	Ferris State	6–5	2–3	T–4th	
Ferris State Bulldogs (Midwest Intercollegiate Football Conference) (1990–1994)
1990	Ferris State	6–4–1	5–4–1	T–4th	
1991	Ferris State	5–6	5–5	T–4th	
1992	Ferris State	10–3	8–2	T–1st	L NCAA Division II Quarterfinal
1993	Ferris State	9–1–2	8–0–2	1st	L NCAA Division II First Round
1994	Ferris State	11–1	10–0	1st	L NCAA Division II Quarterfinal
Ferris State:		60–39–3	43–24–3		
Hillsdale Chargers (Great Lakes Intercollegiate Athletic Conference) (2002–2016)
2002	Hillsdale	4–7	4–6	T–7th	
2003	Hillsdale	4–7	4–6	T–8th	
2004	Hillsdale	4–7	4–6	T–7th	
2005	Hillsdale	5–6	4–6	7th	
2006	Hillsdale	5–6	5–5	T–7th	
2007	Hillsdale	8–3	7–3	3rd	
2008	Hillsdale	7–4	6–4	6th	
2009	Hillsdale	10–3	8–2	T–2nd	L NCAA Division II Second Round
2010	Hillsdale	9–3	8–2	T–2nd / T–1st (South)	L NCAA Division II First Round
2011	Hillsdale	8–3	8–2	1st / 1st (South)	
2012	Hillsdale	7–4	7–3	T–2nd / T–1st (North)	
2013	Hillsdale	5–6	5–4	T–6th / 4th (North)	
2014	Hillsdale	4–7	4–6	T–7th / T–5th (North)	
2015	Hillsdale	5–6	4–6	T–6th / 4th (North)	
2016	Hillsdale	5–5	4–5	9th / 5th (North)	
Hillsdale Chargers (Great Midwest Athletic Conference) (2017–2023)
2017	Hillsdale	7–4	5–2	3rd	
2018	Hillsdale	10–3	8–0	1st	L NCAA Division II Second Round
2019	Hillsdale	6–5	4–3	4th	
2020–21	Hillsdale	2–2	2–2	5th	
2021	Hillsdale	6–6	5–2	T–2nd	L America's Crossroads Bowl
2022	Hillsdale	5–6	4–4	5th	
2023	Hillsdale	6–5	6–3	T–3rd	
Hillsdale:		132–108	116–82		
Total:		192–147–3			
National championship Conference title Conference division title or championship game berth
