= Harry McRae =

American football coach

Playing career
- 1904: Hillsdale
- Position: Quarterback

Coaching career (HC unless noted)
- 1904: Hillsdale

Head coaching record
- Overall: 0–7

Henry C. McRae was an American football coach. He served as the head football coach at Hillsdale College in Hillsdale, Michigan for one season in 1904, compiling a record of 0–7. McRae, who also played on the team, was the first full time coach in the school's history. He also served as athletic director.
