= Erik Ieuter =

American football coach (born c. 1981)

Current position
- Title: Head coach
- Team: Olivet
- Conference: MIAA
- Record: 1–9

Biographical details
- Born: c. 1981 (age 44–45); Midland, Michigan, U.S.
- Education: Albion College (2003); Adams State College (2004)

Playing career
- 1999–2002: Albion
- Position: Wide receiver

Coaching career (HC unless noted)
- 2003: Adams State (GA)
- 2004–2005: Grand Valley State (GA)
- 2006–2008: Michigan Tech (ST/WR)
- 2009–2016: Michigan Tech (OC)
- 2017: Florida (OQC)
- 2018–2024: Muskingum
- 2025–present: Olivet

Head coaching record
- Overall: 28–45

Erik Ieuter (born c. 1981) is an American college football coach. He is the head football coach for the University of Olivet, a position he has held since 2025. He was the head football coach for Muskingum University from 2018 to 2024. He also coached for Adams State, Grand Valley State, Michigan Tech, and Florida. He played college football for Albion as a wide receiver.

== Head coaching record ==
| Year | Team | Overall | Conference | Standing | Bowl/playoffs |
|---|---|---|---|---|---|
Muskingum Fighting Muskies (Ohio Athletic Conference) (2018–2024)
| 2018 | Muskingum | 4–6 | 3–6 | T–7th | |
| 2019 | Muskingum | 3–7 | 2–7 | T–8th | |
| 2020–21 | Muskingum | 1–2 | 1–2 | 7th | |
| 2021 | Muskingum | 5–5 | 4–5 | T–5th | |
| 2022 | Muskingum | 5–5 | 4–5 | 6th | |
| 2023 | Muskingum | 4–6 | 3–6 | 7th | |
| 2024 | Muskingum | 5–5 | 4–5 | T–5th | |
| Muskingum: | | 27–36 | 21–36 | | |
Olivet Comets (Michigan Intercollegiate Athletic Association) (2025–present)
| 2025 | Olivet | 1–9 | 1–6 | T–6th | |
| 2026 | Olivet | 0–0 | 0–0 | | |
| Olivet: | | 1–9 | 1–6 | | |
| Total: | | 28–45 | | | |
