= Nate Shreffler =

American football coach (born c. 1970)

Current position
- Title: Head coach
- Team: Hillsdale
- Conference: G-MAC
- Record: 12–11

Biographical details
- Born: c. 1970 (age 55–56); Celina, Ohio, U.S.
- Education: Hillsdale College (1993)

Playing career
- 1989–1992: Hillsdale
- Positions: Guard; Long snapper

Coaching career (HC unless noted)
- 1993–1995: Glendale HS (AZ) (assistant)
- 1996–1997: Olivet (OL)
- 1998: Saint Francis (IN) (OL)
- 1999–2009: Hillsdale (OL)
- 2010–2023: Hillsdale (OC/OL)
- 2024–present: Hillsdale

Head coaching record
- Overall: 12–11

Nathan Shreffler (born c. 1970) is an American college football coach. He is the head football coach for Hillsdale College, a position he has held since 2024. He also coached for Glendale High School, Olivet, Saint Francis in Fort Wayne, Indiana, and he was a long-time assistant for Hillsdale from 1999 to 2023. He played college football for Hillsdale as a guard and long snapper.

== Head coaching record ==
Year	Team	Overall	Conference	Standing	Bowl/playoffs
Hillsdale Chargers (Great Midwest Athletic Conference) (2024–present)
2024	Hillsdale	6–5	6–3	4th	
2025	Hillsdale	6–6	5–4	5th	L Albanese Candy
Hillsdale:		12–11	11–7		
Total:		12–11			
