= Frank "Muddy" Waters Stadium =

Stadium in Hillsdale, Michigan

Frank Waters Stadium
- Muddy Waters Stadium
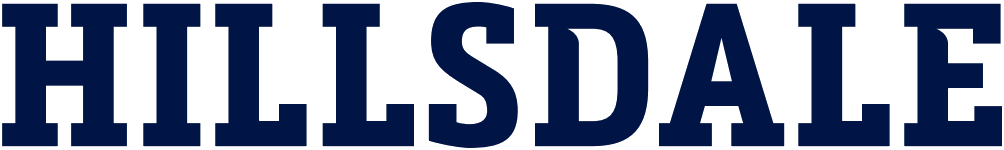
- Interactive map of Frank Waters Stadium
- Full name: Frank "Muddy" Waters Stadium
- Address: 201 Oak St; Hillsdale, MI; United States
- Coordinates: 41°55′53″N 84°37′34″W
- Owner: Hillsdale College
- Operator: Hillsdale College Athletics
- Capacity: 8,500
- Type: Stadium
- Surface: ProGrass artificial turf
- Current use: Football

Construction
- Opened: 1947; 79 years ago

Tenants
- Hillsdale Chargers (NCAA) football (1947–present)

Website
- hillsdalechargers.com/waters-stadium

Frank "Muddy" Waters Stadium is an American football stadium located in south-central Michigan in the town of Hillsdale. The facility is owned and operated by the Hillsdale College, serving as home to the Hillsdale Chargers college football team, which competes at the NCAA Division II level as a member of the Great Midwest Athletic Conference (G-MAC).

The facility is named in honor of College Football Hall of Fame coach Frank "Muddy" Waters, who led the Chargers to a 138–47–5 record from 1954 through 1973. The stadium has an official seating capacity of 8,500.
