= Hillsdale Chargers =

Sports programs at Hillsdale College in Michigan

- University: Hillsdale College
- Nickname: Chargers
- NCAA: Division II
- Conference: G-MAC
- Athletic director: John Tharp
- Location: Hillsdale, Michigan
- Varsity teams: 14 (7 men's, 7 women's)
- Football stadium: Frank D. "Muddy" Waters Stadium
- Basketball arena: Dawn Tibbetts Potter Arena
- Baseball stadium: Lenda and Glenda Hill Stadium
- Softball stadium: Johnny Williams Field
- Aquatics center: Jack McAvoy Natatorium
- Other venues: Ken Herrick Track; Hayden Park; Margot V. Biermann Center
- Colors: Blue and white
- Website: hillsdalechargers.com
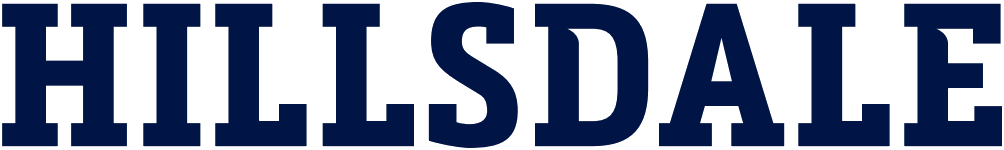

The Hillsdale Chargers are the athletic teams that represent Hillsdale College, located in Hillsdale, Michigan, in NCAA Division II intercollegiate sporting competitions. The Chargers (The Dales until a 1968 mascot name change) are currently members of the Great Midwest Athletic Conference as of 2017. The Chargers had been members of the GLIAC since 1975.

The college also has club teams and intramural sports that vary from year to year.

== Conference history ==
- Michigan Intercollegiate Athletic Association (1888-1960)
- Independent (1961-1975)
- Great Lakes Intercollegiate Athletic Conference (1975–2017)
- Great Midwest Athletic Conference (2017–present)

== Varsity teams ==
| Men's sports | Women's sports |
|---|---|
| Baseball | Basketball |
| Basketball | Cross Country |
| Cross Country | Softball |
| Football | Swimming |
| Golf | Tennis |
| Tennis | Track and field |
| Track and field | Volleyball |

=== Baseball ===
The Chargers baseball team plays their home games at Simpson Field, located near Frank "Muddy" Waters Stadium. The Chargers made their first appearance in the NCAA tournament in 2016 where they fell to the Grand Valley State Lakers and the Indianapolis Greyhounds. After the Chargers move to the Great Midwest Athletic Conference, the Chargers secured their first conference championship in 2018 with a 15–2 win over the Kentucky Wesleyan Panthers, their first conference championship since 1960.

=== Basketball ===
The men's and women's basketball programs of Hillsdale College play their home games in the newly renovated Dawn Tibbetts Potter Arena. The arena is located within the Roche Sports Complex and is adjacent to Frank "Muddy" Waters Stadium. It has a maximum seating capacity of 2,200 spectators. However, additional standing room is available.

=== Football ===
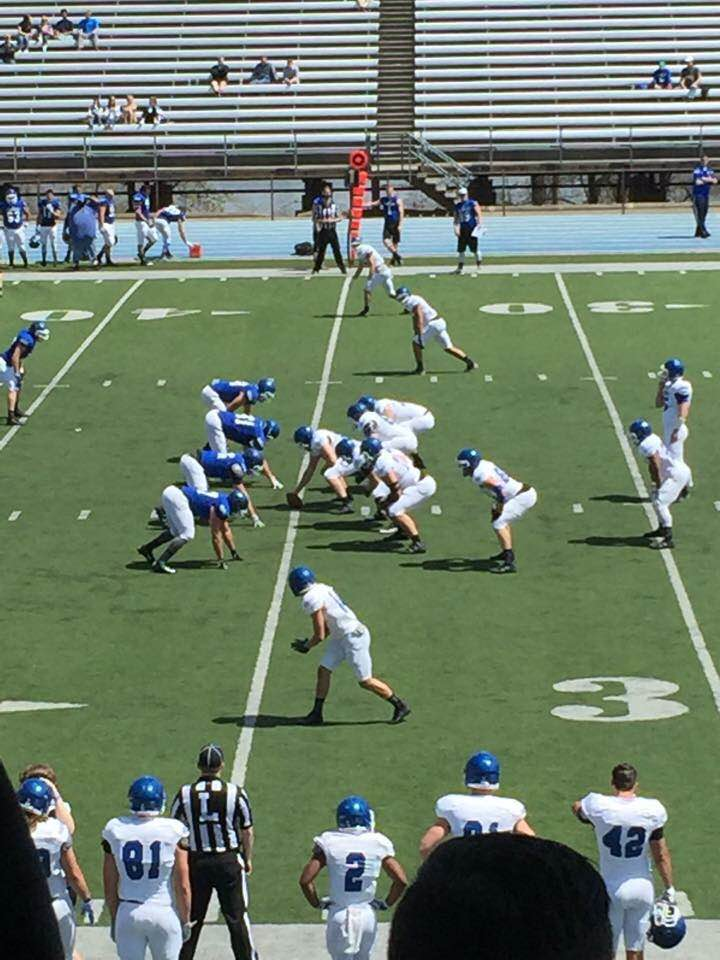
The Chargers of Hillsdale College in the 2016 spring game

The Hillsdale College Chargers football teams play their home games at Frank "Muddy" Waters Stadium. The stadium has an official seating capacity of 8,500 spectators. Football coach Muddy Waters was the head coach at Hillsdale from 1954 to 1973. The football stadium is named in his honor.

=== Softball ===
At Hillsdale, the varsity softball team competes at their home Johnny Williams Field. The Charger softball team won the Great Midwest Athletic Conference championship in 2018, the school's softball team's first conference championship at the NCAA Division II level. This win earned them a berth in the NCAA regional tournament where the Chargers went on to beat the nationally ranked, and first place in the region, Grand Valley State University Lakers before falling to that year’s national champions: the Eagles of the University of Southern Indiana. The Charger softball team has recently acquired a new coach, Kyle Gross, after previous head coach Joe Abraham took the position at University of Toledo. Gross, who took over in the 2019 season, led the Chargers to yet another G-MAC conference championship and a 13–11 conference record.

=== Volleyball ===
The women's volleyball team of Hillsdale College play their home games in the newly renovated Dawn Tibbetts Potter Arena, formerly known as the Jesse Phillips Arena.

== Facilities ==
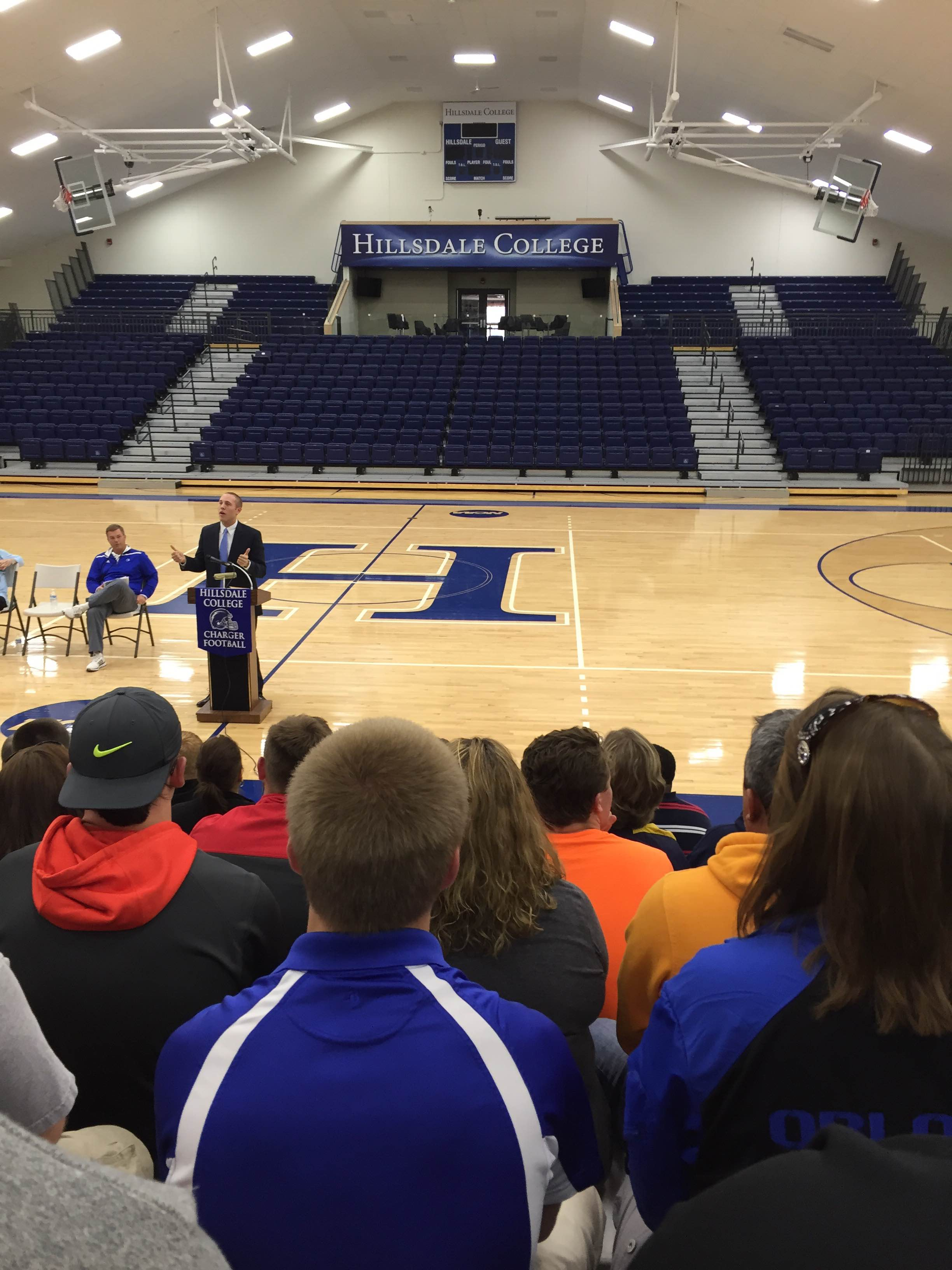
The home seating in the newly renovated Dawn Tibbetts Potter Arena

| Venue | Sport(s) | Open. | Ref. |
|---|---|---|---|
| Frank "Muddy" Waters Stadium | Football | 1947 | |
| Dawn Tibbetts Potter Arena | Basketball; Volleyball | 1986 | |
| Lenda and Glenda Hill Stadium | Baseball | 2024 | |
| Johnny Williams Field | Softball | 1986 | |
| Hayden Park | Track and field | 2010 | |
| Mary Jane Delp Courts | Tennis | 2015 | |
| Jack McAvoy Natatorium | Swimming | 1989 | |

=== Former facilities ===
| Venue | Sport(s) | Open. | Closed | Ref. |
|---|---|---|---|---|
| Simpson Field | Baseball | 1961 | n/a | |

== National championships ==
(1960–2015):

- 1960: Baseball – NAIA
- 1985: Football – NAIA Division I
- 1993 and 1994: NAIA Men's Indoor Track & Field, High Jump Champion: Jim McHugh
- 2010 NCAA Division II Men's Indoor Track & Field, 35# Weight Throw Champion: Jason Stomps
- 2012: NCAA Division II Women's Indoor Track & Field, 800 Meter and 1 Mile Champion: Amanda Putt
- 2012: ACUI Collegiate Clay Target Division III Champions Combined High Overall Team in American Skeet, American Trap, International Skeet, International Trap, Five Stand, Sporting Clays
- 2015: NCAA Division II Women's Indoor Track & Field, Distance Medley Relay (DMR) Champions: Kate Royer, Corinne Zehner, Amy Kerst, Emily Oren; 3000 Meter Champion: Emily Oren
- 2015: NCAA Division II Women's Outdoor Track & Field, 3000 Meter Steeplechase and 5000 Meter Champion: Emily Oren
- 2015: NCAA Division II Men's Outdoor Track & Field, 400 Meter Hurdles Champion: Maurice Jones
- 2026: NCAA Division II Women's Indoor Track & Field, 5000 meter Champion: Allison Kuzma

=== National Runners-up ===
- 1957: Football – NAIA
- 1992: Men's Cross Country – NAIA
- 1994: Men's Cross Country – NAIA
- 1992: NAIA Men's Outdoor Track & Field, High Jump : Jim McHugh
- 1994: NCAA DII Indoor Track & Field, High Jump : Jim McHugh
- 2014: NCAA DII Women's Cross Country,
- 2015: NCAA DII Women's Indoor Track & Field
- 2015: NCAA DII Women's Indoor Track & Field, 3000 Meter and 5000 Meter: Kristina Galat
- 2015: NCAA DII Men's Indoor Track & Field, Pole Vault: Jared Schipper

=== Basketball Final Four ===
- 1981: Men's Basketball – NAIA Division I

== Alumni ==
Chargers athletes have enjoyed numerous accolades in their respective sports, and many have moved on to the professional level:

- Football – Howard Mudd (San Francisco 49ers, Chicago Bears), Isaac TeSlaa (Detroit Lions) , Chester Marcol (Green Bay Packers, Houston Oilers), Jared Veldheer (Arizona Cardinals, Green Bay Packers), Andre Holmes (Oakland Raiders), Nate Johnson (wide receiver) (Winnipeg Blue Bombers)
- Basketball – Cory Coe (United States, Portugal and Germany), Tim Deselski (Luxembourg), Tony Gugino (Bulgaria, Switzerland), Brad Guinane (United Kingdom), Michael Lake (Germany), Tim Martin (Canada), Nick Washburn (Spain), Jack Gohlke (Oakland).
