= List of Great Lakes Intercollegiate Athletic Conference football standings =

This is a list of yearly Great Lakes Intercollegiate Athletic Conference football standings.

== Great Lakes standings ==
2012 Great Lakes Intercollegiate Athletic Conference football standings
	Conf.			Overall
Team	W		L	W		L
North
Grand Valley State	7	–	3	8	–	3
Saginaw Valley State	7	–	3	8	–	3
Michigan Tech	7	–	3	7	–	3
Hillsdale	7	–	3	7	–	4
Ferris State	6	–	4	7	–	4
Wayne State (MI)	5	–	5	5	–	5
Northwood	4	–	6	5	–	6
Northern Michigan	4	–	6	5	–	6
South
No. 9 Ashland $^	10	–	0	11	–	1
Ohio Dominican	7	–	3	8	–	3
Findlay	7	–	3	7	–	3
Lake Erie	3	–	7	3	–	8
Notre Dame (OH)	2	–	8	3	–	8
Tiffin	2	–	8	3	–	8
Walsh *	2	–	8	3	–	8
Malone *	1	–	9	1	–	9
$ – Conference champion; ^ – NCAA Division II playoff participant; * – Provisional NCAA Division II member; Rankings from AFCA poll

2013 Great Lakes Intercollegiate Athletic Conference football standings
	Conf.			Overall
Team	W		L	W		L
North
No. 22 Saginaw Valley State ^	9	–	1	9	–	3
Ferris State	8	–	2	8	–	3
No. 3 Grand Valley State ^	7	–	2	12	–	3
Michigan Tech	6	–	4	6	–	4
Hillsdale	5	–	4	5	–	6
Northern Michigan	3	–	7	3	–	7
Wayne State (MI)	3	–	7	3	–	8
Northwood	1	–	8	2	–	9
South
No. 12 Ohio Dominican $^	9	–	0	10	–	1
Findlay	6	–	3	8	–	3
Ashland	5	–	4	5	–	5
Lake Erie	3	–	6	4	–	7
Walsh	3	–	6	3	–	8
Malone	1	–	8	2	–	9
Tiffin	1	–	8	2	–	9
$ – Conference champion; ^ – NCAA Division II playoff participant; Rankings from AFCA poll

2014 Great Lakes Intercollegiate Athletic Conference football standings
	Conf.			Overall
Team	W		L	W		L
No. 11 Ferris State $^	10	–	0	11	–	1
No. 4 Ohio Dominican ^	9	–	1	11	–	2
No. 21 Michigan Tech ^	9	–	1	9	–	2
Ashland	8	–	2	8	–	2
Wayne State (MI)	6	–	4	7	–	4
Grand Valley State	6	–	4	6	–	5
Findlay	4	–	6	5	–	6
Northwood	4	–	6	5	–	6
Tiffin	4	–	6	5	–	6
Hillsdale	4	–	6	4	–	7
Lake Erie	3	–	7	4	–	7
Walsh	3	–	7	4	–	7
Northern Michigan	2	–	8	3	–	8
Saginaw Valley State	2	–	8	2	–	9
Malone	1	–	9	1	–	10
$ – Conference champion; ^ – NCAA Division II playoff participant; Rankings from AFCA poll

2015 Great Lakes Intercollegiate Athletic Conference football standings
	Conf.			Overall
Team	W		L	W		L
No. 6 Ferris State +^	10	–	0	11	–	1
No. 10 Ashland +^	10	–	0	10	–	1
No. 4 Grand Valley State ^	8	–	2	12	–	3
Ohio Dominican	7	–	3	8	–	3
Michigan Tech	7	–	3	7	–	3
Findlay	5	–	5	6	–	5
Wayne State (MI)	5	–	5	6	–	5
Hillsdale	5	–	5	5	–	6
Northwood	5	–	5	5	–	6
Northern Michigan	4	–	6	5	–	6
Tiffin	4	–	6	5	–	6
Walsh	2	–	8	2	–	8
Lake Erie	2	–	8	2	–	9
Saginaw Valley State	1	–	9	1	–	10
Malone	0	–	10	0	–	10
$ – Conference champion; ^ – NCAA Division II playoff participant; Rankings from AFCA poll

2016 Great Lakes Intercollegiate Athletic Conference football standings
	Conf.			Overall
Team	W		L	W		L
No. 4 Grand Valley State $^	10	–	0	12	–	1
No. 5 Ferris State ^	9	–	2	12	–	3
No. 19 Ashland	7	–	2	9	–	2
Tiffin	7	–	3	8	–	3
Ohio Dominican	7	–	4	7	–	4
Wayne State (MI)	7	–	4	7	–	4
Findlay	6	–	5	6	–	5
Saginaw Valley State	5	–	5	5	–	5
Hillsdale	4	–	5	5	–	5
Michigan Tech	4	–	6	4	–	6
Northern Michigan	3	–	7	3	–	8
Northwood	3	–	8	3	–	8
Walsh	0	–	10	1	–	10
Lake Erie	0	–	11	0	–	11
$ – Conference champion; ^ – NCAA Division II playoff participant; Rankings from AFCA poll
