= Northern Michigan Wildcats football, 2010–2019 =

American college football season

2010–2019 Northern Michigan Wildcats football
- Conference: Great Lakes Intercollegiate Athletic Conference
- Head coach: Bernie Anderson (2006–2011); Chris Ostrowsky (2012–2016); Kyle Nystrom (2017–2019, 2021–2022)

The Northern Michigan Wildcats football program, 2010–2019 represented Northern Michigan University during the 2010s in NCAA Division II college football as a member of the Great Lakes Intercollegiate Athletic Conference (GLIAC). The team was led during the decade by three head coaches: Bernie Anderson (2006–2011); Chris Ostrowsky (2012–2016); and Kyle Nystrom (2017–2019, 2021–2022).

During the decade, the Wildcats did not have a winning season and compiled an overall record of 33–74. Their best season was 2010 when they compiled a 5–6 record, finished in a tie for third place in the GLIAC's North Division, and outscored opponents, 221 to 183.

The team played its home games at Superior Dome in Marquette, Michigan.

== Decade overview ==
Year	Head coach	Overall record	Conf. record	Conf. rank	Points scored	Points allowed	Delta
2010	Bernie Anderson	5–6	5–5	T–3 (North)	221	183	+38
2011	Bernie Anderson	4–7	3–7	6 (North)	290	326	-36
2012	Chris Ostrowsky	5–6	4–6	T–7 (North)	231	346	-115
2013	Chris Ostrowsky	3–7	3–7	T–6 (North)	235	342	-107
2014	Chris Ostrowsky	3–8	2–8	T–13	281	314	-33
2015	Chris Ostrowsky	5–6	4–6	T–10	315	357	-42
2016	Chris Ostrowsky	3–8	3–7	11	340	442	-102
2017	Kyle Nystrom	1–9	1–8	9	172	303	-31
2018	Kyle Nystrom	3–8	1–7	T–8	291	333	-42
2019	Kyle Nystrom	1–9	0–8	9	152	319	-167
TOTAL		33–74					

== 2010 ==
2010 Northern Michigan Wildcats football
- Conference: Great Lakes Intercollegiate Athletic Conference
- North Division
- Record: 5–6 (5–5 GLIAC)
- Head coach: Bernie Anderson (5th season)
- Offensive coordinator: Chris Ostrowsky (1st season)
- Defensive coordinator: Randy Awrey (3rd season)
- Home stadium: Superior Dome

2010 Great Lakes Intercollegiate Athletic Conference football standings
	Conf.			Overall
Team	W		L	W		L
North
No. 10 Grand Valley State $^	9	–	1	11	–	2
No. 25 Michigan Tech	8	–	2	8	–	2
Indianapolis	5	–	5	6	–	5
Ferris State	5	–	5	5	–	6
Northern Michigan	5	–	5	5	–	6
Northwood	5	–	5	5	–	6
Saginaw Valley State	4	–	6	4	–	7
South
No. 21 Wayne State (MI)	8	–	2	9	–	2
No. 16 Hillsdale ^	8	–	2	9	–	3
Ashland	7	–	3	8	–	3
Lake Erie	3	–	7	3	–	8
Ohio Dominican *	2	–	8	2	–	8
Findlay	1	–	9	1	–	10
Tiffin	0	–	10	1	–	10
$ – Conference champion; ^ – NCAA Division II playoff participant; * – Provisional NCAA Division II member; Rankings from AFCA poll

The 2010 Northern Michigan Wildcats football team represented Northern Michigan University as a member of the Great Lakes Intercollegiate Athletic Conference (GLIAC) during the 2010 NCAA Division II football season. In their fifth year under head coach Bernie Anderson, the Wildcats compiled a 5–6 record (5–5 in conference games), finished in a four-way tie for third place in the GLIAC's North Division, and outscored opponents by a total of 221 to 183.

The team's statistical leaders included:

- Carter Kopach completed 52 of 96 passes (54.17%) for 820 yards, seven touchdowns, six interceptions and a 137.48 efficiency rating.
- John Privitelli tallied 487 rushing yards on 123 carries for an average of 4.0 yards per carry.
- D Brancheau tallied 25 receptions for 382 yards, an average of 15.28 yards per reception.
- Kicker Rockne Belmonte was the team's leading scorer with 44 points on eight field goals and 20 extra points.
- Josh Droese led the team with 48 total tackles.

=== Schedule ===
Date	Time	Opponent	Site	Result	Attendance	Source
9/2/2010	7:00 p.m.	at Minnesota State*	Blakeslee Stadium; Mankato, MN	L 6–7	3,713	
9/11/2010	2:00 p.m.	Findlay	Superior Dome; Marquette, MI	W 49–10	4,261	
9/18/2010	12:00 p.m.	at Northwood	Hantz Stadium; Midland, MI	W 31–17	2,206	
9/25/2010	4:00 p.m.	Ashland	Superior Dome; Marquette, MI	W 23–19	4,601	
10/2/2010	12:00 p.m.	at Wayne State (MI)	Tom Adams Field; Detroit, MMI	L 18–26	2,786	
10/9/2010	7:00 p.m.	at No. 1 Grand Valley State	Lubbers Stadium; Allendale, MI	L 7–28	12,307	
10/16/2010	1:00 p.m.	Ferris State	Superior Dome; Marquette, MI	W 22–20	3,773	
10/23/2010	1:00 p.m.	Indianapolis	Superior Dome; Marquette, MI	L 5–6	3,114	
10/30/2010	1:30 p.m.	at Tiffin	Frost–Kalnow Stadium; Tiffin, OH	W 43–14	650	
11/6/2010	1:00 p.m.	Saginaw Valley State	Superior Dome; Marquette, MI	L 17–24 ^{OT}	1,987	
11/13/2010	1:00 p.m.	at Michigan Tech	Sherman Field; Houghton, MI (Miner's Cup)	L 0–12	1,943	
*Non-conference game; Rankings from AFCA Poll released prior to the game; All times are in Eastern time

== 2011 ==
2011 Northern Michigan Wildcats football
- Conference: Great Lakes Intercollegiate Athletic Conference
- North Division
- Record: 4–7 (3–7 GLIAC)
- Head coach: Bernie Anderson (6th season)
- Offensive coordinator: Chris Ostrowsky (2nd season)
- Defensive coordinator: Randy Awrey (4th season)
- Home stadium: Hantz Stadium

2011 Great Lakes Intercollegiate Athletic Conference football standings
	Conf.			Overall
Team	W		L	W		L
North
Grand Valley State	7	–	3	8	–	3
Saginaw Valley State ^	7	–	3	7	–	4
Indianapolis	6	–	4	7	–	4
Michigan Tech	6	–	4	7	–	4
Ferris State	5	–	5	6	–	5
Northern Michigan	3	–	7	4	–	7
Northwood	1	–	9	2	–	9
South
Hillsdale $	8	–	2	8	–	3
No. 2 Wayne State (MI) ^	7	–	3	12	–	4
Ohio Dominican	6	–	4	7	–	4
Ashland	6	–	4	6	–	5
Findlay	6	–	4	6	–	5
Lake Erie	2	–	8	3	–	8
Tiffin	0	–	10	0	–	11
$ – Conference champion; ^ – NCAA Division II playoff participant; Rankings from AFCA poll

The 2011 Northern Michigan Wildcats football team represented Northern Michigan University as a member of the Great Lakes Intercollegiate Athletic Conference (GLIAC) during the 2011 NCAA Division II football season. In their sixth and final year under head coach Bernie Anderson, the Wildcats compiled a 4–7 record (3–7 in conference games), finished in a tie for third place in the GLIAC's North Division, and were outscored by a total of 326 to 290.

At the end of the 2011 season, Northern Michigan announced that it would not renew Anderson's contract as the school's head football coach.

The team's statistical leaders included:

- Carter Kopach completed 186 of 327 passes (56.88%) for 1,982 yards, 15 touchdowns, 16 interceptions, and a 113.14 efficiencey rating. Kopach also had 502 rushing yards.
- Prince Young tallied 811 rushing yards on 177 carries for an average of 4.6 yards per carry.
- C Jessie led the team with 549 receiving yards on 50 receptions.
- C Marble-king led the team with 53 receptions for 429 yards.
- Julian Gaynes led the team with an average of 15.6 yards per reception (33 receptions for 515 yards).
- Kicker Rockne Belmonte led the team in scoring with 68 points on 13 field goals and 29 extra points.
- Zach Anderson led the team with 61 total tackles and 9.0 tackles for loss.

=== Schedule ===
Date	Time	Opponent	Rank	Site	Result	Attendance	Source
9/1/2011	7:00 p.m.	Minnesota State*		Superior Dome; Marquette, MI	W 31–24	5,352	
9/10/2011	12:00 p.m.	at Findlay		Donnell Stadium; Findlay, OH	W 30–23	1,225	
9/17/2011	1:00 p.m.	Northwood		Superior Dome; Marquette, MI	W 38–17	2,623	
9/24/2011	7:00 p.m.	at Ashland	No. 23	Jack Miller Stadium; Ashland, OH	L 16–45	3,837	
10/1/2011	4:00 p.m.	No. 9 Wayne State (MI)^{†}		Superior Dome; Marquette, MI	L 28–30	4,333	
10/8/2011	1:00 p.m.	Grand Valley State		Superior Dome; Marquette, MI	L 7–42	3,817	
10/15/2011	2:00 p.m.	at Ferris State		Top Taggart Field; Big Rapids, MI	L 6–35	3,241	
10/22/2011	6:00 p.m.	at Indianapolis		Key Stadium; Indianapolis, IN	L 31–38	2,884	
10/29/2011	1:00 p.m.	Tiffin		Superior Dome; Marquette, MI	W 59–3	2,933	
11/5/2011	7:00 p.m.	at Saginaw Valley State		Wickes Stadium; University Center, MI	L 26–48	7,068	
11/12/2011	1:00 p.m.	Michigan Tech		Superior Dome; Marquette, MI (Miner's Cup)	L 18–21	4,056	
*Non-conference game; ^{†}Homecoming; Rankings from AFCA Poll released prior to the game; All times are in Eastern time

== 2012 ==
2012 Northern Michigan Wildcats football
- Conference: Great Lakes Intercollegiate Athletic Conference
- North Division
- Record: 5–6 (4–6 GLIAC)
- Head coach: Chris Ostrowsky (1st season)
- Defensive coordinator: Brian Newberry (1st season)
- Home stadium: Superior Dome

2012 Great Lakes Intercollegiate Athletic Conference football standings
	Conf.			Overall
Team	W		L	W		L
North
Grand Valley State	7	–	3	8	–	3
Saginaw Valley State	7	–	3	8	–	3
Michigan Tech	7	–	3	7	–	3
Hillsdale	7	–	3	7	–	4
Ferris State	6	–	4	7	–	4
Wayne State (MI)	5	–	5	5	–	5
Northwood	4	–	6	5	–	6
Northern Michigan	4	–	6	5	–	6
South
No. 9 Ashland $^	10	–	0	11	–	1
Ohio Dominican	7	–	3	8	–	3
Findlay	7	–	3	7	–	3
Lake Erie	3	–	7	3	–	8
Notre Dame (OH)	2	–	8	3	–	8
Tiffin	2	–	8	3	–	8
Walsh *	2	–	8	3	–	8
Malone *	1	–	9	1	–	9
$ – Conference champion; ^ – NCAA Division II playoff participant; * – Provisional NCAA Division II member; Rankings from AFCA poll

The 2012 Northern Michigan Wildcats football team represented Northern Michigan University as a member of the Great Lakes Intercollegiate Athletic Conference (GLIAC) during the 2012 NCAA Division II football season. In their first year under head coach Chris Ostrowsky, the Wildcats compiled a 5–6 record (4–6 in conference games), finished in a tie for last place in the GLIAC's North Division, and were outscored by a total of 346 to 231.

At the end of the 2011 season, Northern Michigan decided not to renew Bernie Anderson's contract as head coach. Ostrowsky, who had been the school's offensive coordinator the prior two season, was promoted to head coach.

The team's statistical leaders included:

- Cody Scepaniak completed 74 of 128 passes (57.8%) for 1,055 yards, six touchdowns, six interceptions, and a 133.14 efficiency rating. Scepaniak also rushed for 479, second best on the team.
- Prince Young tallied 545 rushing yards on 139 carries for an average of 3.9 yards per carry.
- C Jessie led the team with 501 receiving yards on 32 receptions (15.66 yards per catch).
- Julian Gaines led the team with 33 receptions, good for 380 yards.
- Starlin Darling led the team with an average of 16.55 yards per catch (20 receptions, 331 yards).
- Kicker Rockne Belmonte led the team in scoring with 67 points on 14 field goals and 25 extra points.
- Nick Krause led the team with 94 total tackles, including 56 solo tackles and 12.5 tackles for loss.

=== Schedule ===
Date	Time	Opponent	Site	Result	Attendance	Source
8/30/2012	7:00 p.m.	at Findlay	Donnell Stadium; Findlay, OH	L 10–45	1,673	
9/6/2012	7:00 p.m.	Wisconsin–La Crosse*	Superior Dome; Marquette, MI	W 24–6	2,467	
9/15/2012	1:00 p.m.	at Ohio Dominican	Panther Stadium; Columbus, OH	L 7–47	1,152	
9/22/2012	2:00 p.m.	Ashland^{†}	Superior Dome; Marquette, MI	L 13–42	3,408	
9/29/2012	1:30 p.m.	at Hillsdale	Muddy Waters Stadium; Hillsdale, MI	L 6–44	1,362	
10/6/2012	1:00 p.m.	Michigan Tech	Superior Dome; Marquette, MI (Miner's Cup)	L 17–41	4,954	
10/13/2012	1:00 p.m.	Grand Valley State	Superior Dome; Marquette, MI	W 38–10	2,217	
10/20/2012	12:00 p.m.	at Wayne State (MI)	Tom Adams Field; Detroit, MI	L 31–38	3,119	
10/27/2012	12:00 p.m.	at Northwood	Hantz Stadium; Midland, MI	W 21–13	1.012	
11/3/2012	1:00 p.m.	Saginaw Valley State	Superior Dome; Marquette, MI	W 33–28	1,733	
11/10/2012	1:00 p.m.	Ferris State	Superior Dome; Marquette, MI	L 31–32	2,543	
*Non-conference game; ^{†}Homecoming; All times are in Eastern time

== 2013 ==
2013 Northern Michigan Wildcats football
- Conference: Great Lakes Intercollegiate Athletic Conference
- North Division
- Record: 3–7 (3–7 GLIAC)
- Head coach: Chris Ostrowsky (2nd season)
- Home stadium: Superior Dome

2013 Great Lakes Intercollegiate Athletic Conference football standings
	Conf.			Overall
Team	W		L	W		L
North
No. 22 Saginaw Valley State ^	9	–	1	9	–	3
Ferris State	8	–	2	8	–	3
No. 3 Grand Valley State ^	7	–	2	12	–	3
Michigan Tech	6	–	4	6	–	4
Hillsdale	5	–	4	5	–	6
Northern Michigan	3	–	7	3	–	7
Wayne State (MI)	3	–	7	3	–	8
Northwood	1	–	8	2	–	9
South
No. 12 Ohio Dominican $^	9	–	0	10	–	1
Findlay	6	–	3	8	–	3
Ashland	5	–	4	5	–	5
Lake Erie	3	–	6	4	–	7
Walsh	3	–	6	3	–	8
Malone	1	–	8	2	–	9
Tiffin	1	–	8	2	–	9
$ – Conference champion; ^ – NCAA Division II playoff participant; Rankings from AFCA poll

The 2013 Northern Michigan Wildcats football team represented Northern Michigan University as a member of the Great Lakes Intercollegiate Athletic Conference (GLIAC) during the 2013 NCAA Division II football season. In their second year under head coach Chris Ostrowsky, the Wildcats compiled a 3–7 record (3–7 in conference games), finished in a tie for last place in the GLIAC's North Division, and were outscored by a total of 342 to 235.

The team's statistical leaders included:

- Shaye Brown completed 94 of 184 passes (51.09%) for 1,194 yards, seven touchdowns, six interceptions, and a 111.63 efficiency rating.
- Wyatt Jurasin tallied 545 rushing yards on 145 carries for an average of 3.8 yards per carry.
- Christian Jessie led the team with 724 receiving yards and an average of 15.4 yards per reception.
- Marcus Tucker led the team with 49 receptions for 674 yards.
- Kicker John Oberheide was the team's leading scorer with 39 points on seven field goals and 18 extra point kicks.
- Nick Krause led the team with 83 total tackles.

=== Schedule ===
Date	Time	Opponent	Site	Result	Attendance	Source
9/14/2013	1:00 p.m.	Findlay	Superior Dome; Marquette, MI	W 41–31	2,327	
9/21/2013	3:00 p.m.	Ohio Dominican^{†}	Superior Dome; Marquette, MI	L 23–30	4,102	
9/28/2013	7:00 p.m.	at Ashland	Jack Miller Stadium; Ashland, OH	L 24–52	4,118	
10/5/2013	1:00 p.m.	Hillsdale	Superior Dome; Marquette, MI	L 17–27	1,704	
10/12/2013	1:00 p.m.	at Michigan Tech	Sherman Field; Houghton, MI (Miner's Cup)	L 7–31	2,862	
10/19/2013	7:00 p.m.	at Grand Valley State	Lubbers Stadium; Allendale, MI	L 17–48	13,391	
10/26/2013	1:00 p.m.	Wayne State (MI)	Superior Dome; Marquette, MI	W 33–21	4,103	
11/2/2013	1:00 p.m.	Northwood	Superior Dome; Marquette, MI	W 34–15	1,672	
11/9/2013	1:00 p.m.	at No. 19 Saginaw Valley State	Wickes Stadium; University Center, MI	L 17–52	6,257	
11/16/2013	12:00 p.m.	at Ferris State	Top Taggart Field; Big Rapids, MI	L 22–35	1,634	
^{†}Homecoming; Rankings from AFCA Poll released prior to the game; All times are in Eastern time

== 2014 ==
2014 Northern Michigan Wildcats football
- Conference: Great Lakes Intercollegiate Athletic Conference
- Record: 3–8 (2–8 GLIAC)
- Head coach: Chris Ostrowsky (3rd season)
- Home stadium: Superior Dome

2014 Great Lakes Intercollegiate Athletic Conference football standings
	Conf.			Overall
Team	W		L	W		L
No. 11 Ferris State $^	10	–	0	11	–	1
No. 4 Ohio Dominican ^	9	–	1	11	–	2
No. 21 Michigan Tech ^	9	–	1	9	–	2
Ashland	8	–	2	8	–	2
Wayne State (MI)	6	–	4	7	–	4
Grand Valley State	6	–	4	6	–	5
Findlay	4	–	6	5	–	6
Northwood	4	–	6	5	–	6
Tiffin	4	–	6	5	–	6
Hillsdale	4	–	6	4	–	7
Lake Erie	3	–	7	4	–	7
Walsh	3	–	7	4	–	7
Northern Michigan	2	–	8	3	–	8
Saginaw Valley State	2	–	8	2	–	9
Malone	1	–	9	1	–	10
$ – Conference champion; ^ – NCAA Division II playoff participant; Rankings from AFCA poll

The 2014 Northern Michigan Wildcats football team represented Northern Michigan University as a member of the Great Lakes Intercollegiate Athletic Conference (GLIAC) during the 2014 NCAA Division II football season. In their third year under head coach Chris Ostrowsky, the Wildcats compiled a 3–8 record (2–8 in conference games), tied for 13th place in the GLIAC, and were outscored by a total of 314 to 281.

=== Schedule ===
Date	Time	Opponent	Site	Result	Attendance	Source
9/6/2014	7:00 p.m.	Northwood	Superior Dome; Marquette, MI	L 13–23	3,325	
9/13/2014	5:00 p.m.	at Quincy*	Flinn Stadium; Quincy, IL	W 31–14	1,509	
9/20/2014	1:00 p.m.	at Hillsdale	Muddy Waters Stadium; Hillsdale, MI	L 10–13	2,017	
9/27/2014	7:00 p.m.	Michigan Tech	Superior Dome; Marquette, MI (Miner's Cup)	L 31–34	6,427	
10/4/2014	7:00 p.m.	at Saginaw Valley State	Wickes Stadium; University Center, MI	L 7–14	4,110	
10/11/2014	2:00 p.m.	at Malone	Fawcett Stadium; Canton, OH	L 35–42 ^{OT}	2,200	
10/18/2014	1:00 p.m.	Wayne State (MI)	Superior Dome; Marquette, MI	W 33–30	3,461	
10/25/2014	1:00 p.m.	at No. 24 Ashland	Jack Miller Stadium; Ashland, OH	L 14–44	3,130	
11/1/2014	1:00 p.m.	Walsh	Superior Dome; Marquette, MI	L 24–27	1,205	
11/8/2014	12:00 p.m.	at No. 4 Ferris State	Top Taggart Field; Big Rapids, MI	L 17–35	2,465	
11/15/2014	1:00 p.m.	Findlay	Superior Dome; Marquette, MI	W 66–38	1,137	
*Non-conference game; Rankings from AFCA Poll released prior to the game; All times are in Eastern time

== 2015 ==
2015 Northern Michigan Wildcats football
- Conference: Great Lakes Intercollegiate Athletic Conference
- Record: 5–6 (4–6 GLIAC)
- Head coach: Chris Ostrowsky (4th season)
- Home stadium: Superior Dome

2015 Great Lakes Intercollegiate Athletic Conference football standings
	Conf.			Overall
Team	W		L	W		L
No. 6 Ferris State +^	10	–	0	11	–	1
No. 10 Ashland +^	10	–	0	10	–	1
No. 4 Grand Valley State ^	8	–	2	12	–	3
Ohio Dominican	7	–	3	8	–	3
Michigan Tech	7	–	3	7	–	3
Findlay	5	–	5	6	–	5
Wayne State (MI)	5	–	5	6	–	5
Hillsdale	5	–	5	5	–	6
Northwood	5	–	5	5	–	6
Northern Michigan	4	–	6	5	–	6
Tiffin	4	–	6	5	–	6
Walsh	2	–	8	2	–	8
Lake Erie	2	–	8	2	–	9
Saginaw Valley State	1	–	9	1	–	10
Malone	0	–	10	0	–	10
$ – Conference champion; ^ – NCAA Division II playoff participant; Rankings from AFCA poll

The 2015 Northern Michigan Wildcats football team represented Northern Michigan University as a member of the Great Lakes Intercollegiate Athletic Conference (GLIAC) during the 2015 NCAA Division II football season. In their fourth year under head coach Chris Ostrowsky, the Wildcats compiled a 5–6 record (4–6 in conference games), tied for 10th place in the GLIAC, and were outscored by a total of 357 to 315.

=== Schedule ===
Date	Time	Opponent	Site	Result	Attendance	Source
9/5/2015	1:00 p.m.	at Northwood	Hantz Stadium; Midland, MI	L 7–20	3,005	
9/12/2015	4:00 p.m.	Quincy*	Superior Dome; Marquette, MI	W 31–14	2,820	
9/19/2015	4:00 p.m.	Hillsdale	Superior Dome; Marquette, MI	W 32–24	4,289	
9/26/2015	7:00 p.m.	at No. 21 Michigan Tech	Sherman Field; Houghton, MI (Miner's Cup)	L 23–24	3,918	
10/3/2015	4:00 p.m.	Saginaw Valley State	Superior Dome; Marquette, MI	W 36–34	1,523	
10/10/2015	1:00 p.m.	Malone	Superior Dome; Marquette, MI	W 41–13	2,347	
10/17/2015	12:00 p.m.	at Wayne State (MI)	Tom Adams Field; Detroit, MI	L 31–34	1,994	
10/24/2015	1:00 p.m.	No. 8 Ashland	Superior Dome; Marquette, MI	L 40–41	2,576	
10/31/2015	8:00 p.m.	at Walsh	Tom Benson Stadium; Canton, OH	W 35–17	1,655	
11/7/2015	1:00 p.m.	No. 3 Ferris State	Superior Dome; Marquette, MI	L 39–49	2,557	
11/14/2015	12:00 p.m.	at Findlay	Donnell Stadium; Findlay, OH	L 42–45	797	
*Non-conference game; Rankings from AFCA Poll released prior to the game; All times are in Eastern time

== 2016 ==
2016 Northern Michigan Wildcats football
- Conference: Great Lakes Intercollegiate Athletic Conference
- Record: 3–8 (3–7 GLIAC)
- Head coach: Chris Ostrowsky (5th season)
- Home stadium: Superior Dome

2016 Great Lakes Intercollegiate Athletic Conference football standings
	Conf.			Overall
Team	W		L	W		L
No. 4 Grand Valley State $^	10	–	0	12	–	1
No. 5 Ferris State ^	9	–	2	12	–	3
No. 19 Ashland	7	–	2	9	–	2
Tiffin	7	–	3	8	–	3
Ohio Dominican	7	–	4	7	–	4
Wayne State (MI)	7	–	4	7	–	4
Findlay	6	–	5	6	–	5
Saginaw Valley State	5	–	5	5	–	5
Hillsdale	4	–	5	5	–	5
Michigan Tech	4	–	6	4	–	6
Northern Michigan	3	–	7	3	–	8
Northwood	3	–	8	3	–	8
Walsh	0	–	10	1	–	10
Lake Erie	0	–	11	0	–	11
$ – Conference champion; ^ – NCAA Division II playoff participant; Rankings from AFCA poll

The 2016 Northern Michigan Wildcats football team represented Northern Michigan University as a member of the Great Lakes Intercollegiate Athletic Conference (GLIAC) during the 2016 NCAA Division II football season. In their fifth and final year under head coach Chris Ostrowsky, the Wildcats compiled a 3–8 record (3–7 in conference games), tied for 10th place in the GLIAC, and were outscored by a total of 442 to 340.

Jake Mayon led the team with 1,064 rushing yards on 185 carries for an average of 5.8 yards per carry. He also led the team in scoring with 84 points on 14 touchdowns.

Quarterback Shaye Brown completed 216 of 370 passes (58.38%) for 2,372 yards, 23 touchdowns, four interceptions, and a 130.58 efficiency rating.

=== Schedule ===
Date	Time	Opponent	Site	Result	Attendance	Source
9/3/2016	1:00 p.m.	at Lake Erie	Jack Britt Memorial Stadium; Painesville, OH	W 38–35 ^{OT}	1,400	
9/10/2016	4:00 p.m.	Angelo State*	Superior Dome; Marquette, MI	L 41–47 ^{3OT}	4,527	
9/17/2016	7:00 p.m.	at No. 2 Grand Valley State	Lubbers Stadium; Allendale, MI	L 24–50	16,236	
9/24/2016	4:00 p.m.	Northwood^{†}	Superior Dome; Marquette, MI	W 29–24	4,516	
10/1/2016	4:00 p.m.	Walsh	Superior Dome; Marquette, MI	W 54–14	2,309	
10/8/2016	7:00 p.m.	at Saginaw Valley State	Wickes Stadium; University Center, MI	L 13–41	7,103	
10/15/2016	1:00 p.m.	at Ferris State	Top Taggart Field; BIg Rapids, MI	L 23–45	3,881	
10/22/2016	1:00 p.m.	Ohio Dominican	Superior Dome; Marquette, MI	L 28–38	2,422	
10/29/2016	1:00 p.m.	Hillsdale	Superior Dome; Marquette, MI	L 38–41	1,295	
11/5/2016	1:00 p.m.	Michigan Tech	Superior Dome; Marquette, MI (Miner's Cup)	L 45–51 ^{2OT}	3,610	
11/12/2016	1:30 p.m.	at Tiffin	Frost Kalnow Stadium; Tiffin, OH	L 7–56	1,253	
*Non-conference game; ^{†}Homecoming; Rankings from AFCA Poll released prior to the game; All times are in Eastern time

== 2017 ==
2017 Northern Michigan Wildcats football
- Conference: Great Lakes Intercollegiate Athletic Conference
- Record: 1–9 (1–8 GLIAC)
- Head coach: Kyle Nystrom (1st season)
- Defensive coordinator: Kirby Cannon (1st season)
- Home stadium: Superior Dome

2017 Great Lakes Intercollegiate Athletic Conference football standings
	Conf.			Overall
Team	W		L	W		L
No. 10 Ashland $^	9	–	0	11	–	2
No. 5 Ferris State ^	8	–	1	11	–	2
Grand Valley State	7	–	2	8	–	3
Tiffin	5	–	4	6	–	5
Northwood	5	–	4	7	–	4
Wayne State (MI)	4	–	5	5	–	6
Michigan Tech	3	–	6	4	–	7
Saginaw Valley State	3	–	6	5	–	6
Northern Michigan	1	–	8	1	–	9
Davenport *	0	–	9	1	–	10
$ – Conference champion; ^ – NCAA Division II playoff participant; * – Provisional Division II member; Rankings from AFCA poll

The 2017 Northern Michigan Wildcats football team represented Northern Michigan University as a member of the Great Lakes Intercollegiate Athletic Conference (GLIAC) during the 2017 NCAA Division II football season. In their first year under head coach Kyle Nystrom, the Wildcats compiled a 1–9 record (1–8 in conference games), finished in ninth place in the GLIAC, and were outscored by a total of 303 to 172.

The Wildcats hired Nystrom in December 2016 to take over as the school's head football coach. Nystrom had been the co-defensive coordinator at Ferris State. He spent two seasons at Ferris State and, before that, five season at Central Michigan and 13 seasons at Western Michigan.

Running back Jake Mayon led the team with 1,377 rushing yards on 211 carries for an average of 6.5 yards per carry. He also led the team in scoring with 48 points on eight touchdowns.

Quarterback Ryan Johnson completed 122 of 203 passes (60.1%) for 1,581 yards, nine touchdowns, and four interceptions.

=== Schedule ===
Date	Time	Opponent	Site	Result	Attendance	Source
9/9/2017	7:00 p.m.	at Angelo State*	LeGrand Stadium; San Angelo, TX	L 20–48	3,904	
9/16/2017	7:00 p.m.	at No. 2 Ferris State	Top Taggart Field; Big Rapids, MI	L 10–42	6,042	
9/23/2017	1:30 p.m.	Davenport^{†}	Superior Dome; Marquette, MI	W 24–14	3,971	
9/30/2017	7:00 p.m.	at Michigan Tech	Sherman Field; Houghton, MI (Miner's Cup)	L 21–28	2,979	
10/7/2017	1:00 p.m.	No. 18 Ashland	Superior Dome; Marquette, MI	L 13–38	2,550	
10/14/2017	1:00 p.m.	at Tiffin	Frost Kalnow Stadium; Tiffin, OH	L 24–35	1,120	
10/21/2017	1:00 p.m.	Saginaw Valley State	Superior Dome; Marquette, MI	L 12–20	2,393	
10/28/2017	4:00 p.m.	at No. 19 Grand Valley State	Lubbers Stadium; Allendale, MI	L 3–28	12,075	
11/4/2017	12:00 p.m.	at Wayne State (MI)	Tom Adams Field; Detroit, MI	L 24–26	2,954	
11/11/2017	1:00 p.m.	Northwood	Superior Dome; Marquette, MI	L 21–24	1,576	
*Non-conference game; ^{†}Homecoming; Rankings from AFCA Poll released prior to the game; All times are in Eastern time

== 2018 ==
2018 Northern Michigan Wildcats football
- Conference: Great Lakes Intercollegiate Athletic Conference
- Record: 3–8 (1–7 GLIAC)
- Head coach: Kyle Nystrom (2nd season)
- Defensive coordinator: Kirby Cannon (2nd season)
- Home stadium: Superior Dome

2018 Great Lakes Intercollegiate Athletic Conference football standings
	Conf.			Overall
Team	W		L	W		L
No. 2 Ferris State $^	8	–	0	15	–	1
No. 14 Grand Valley State ^	7	–	1	10	–	2
Ashland	6	–	2	6	–	4
Saginaw Valley State	5	–	3	8	–	3
Davenport *	3	–	5	6	–	5
Northwood	3	–	5	3	–	7
Michigan Tech	2	–	6	4	–	6
Northern Michigan	1	–	7	3	–	8
Wayne State (MI)	1	–	7	2	–	9
$ – Conference champion; ^ – NCAA Division II playoff participant; * – Provisional NCAA Division II member; Rankings from AFCA poll

The 2018 Northern Michigan Wildcats football team represented Northern Michigan University as a member of the Great Lakes Intercollegiate Athletic Conference (GLIAC) during the 2018 NCAA Division II football season. In their second year under head coach Kyle Nystrom, the Wildcats compiled a 3–8 record (1–7 in conference games), tied for last place in the GLIAC, and were outscored by a total of 333 to 291.

Running back Jake Mayon led the GLIAC with 1,505 rushing yards on 262 carries for an average of 5.7 yards per carry. He also led the team in scoring with 84 points on 14 touchdowns.

Quarterback Latrell Giles completed 60 of 114 passes (52.6%) for 989 yards, three touchdowns, and six interceptions.

=== Schedule ===
Date	Time	Opponent	Site	Result	Attendance	Source
9/1/2018	2:00 p.m.	at McKendree*	Leemon Field; Lebanon, IL	L 28–34	1,564	
9/8/2018	1:00 p.m.	UT Permian Basin*	Superior Dome; Marquette, MI	W 27–22	2,174	
9/15/2018	1:00 p.m.	No. 5 Grand Valley State	Superior Dome; Marquette, MI	L 14–47	2,042	
9/22/2018	4:00 p.m.	No. 6 Ferris State	Superior Dome; Marquette, MI	L 19–35	4,642	
9/29/2018	12:00 p.m.	at Davenport	Farmers Insurance Complex; Caledonia, MI	L 30–31 ^{OT}	1,844	
10/6/2018	1:00 p.m.	Northwood	Superior Dome; Marquette, MI	L 24–27	2,119	
10/13/2018	1:00 p.m.	at Saginaw Valley State	Wickes Stadium; University Center, MI	L 10–30	6,100	
10/20/2018	1:00 p.m.	Lawrence Tech*	Superior Dome; Marquette, MI	W 65–7	2,843	
10/27/2018	1:00 p.m.	Michigan Tech	Superior Dome; Marquette, MI (Miner's Cup)	L 33–35	4,359	
11/3/2018	1:00 p.m.	at Wayne State (MI)	Tom Adams Field; Detroit, MI	W 34–24	2,057	
11/10/2018	1:00 p.m.	at Ashland	Jack Miller Stadium; Ashland, OH	L 7–41	1,524	
*Non-conference game; Rankings from AFCA Poll released prior to the game; All times are in Eastern time

== 2019 ==
2019 Northern Michigan Wildcats football
- Conference: Great Lakes Intercollegiate Athletic Conference
- Record: 1–9 (0–8 GLIAC)
- Head coach: Kyle Nystrom (3rd season)
- Offensive coordinator: Pat Perles (1st season)
- Defensive coordinator: Kirby Cannon (3rd season)
- Home stadium: Superior Dome

2019 Great Lakes Intercollegiate Athletic Conference football standings
	Conf.			Overall
Team	W		L	W		L
No. 3 Ferris State $^	8	–	0	12	–	1
Wayne State (MI)	7	–	1	8	–	3
Ashland	6	–	2	7	–	4
Grand Valley State	5	–	3	8	–	3
Davenport	3	–	5	5	–	5
Michigan Tech	3	–	5	5	–	5
Saginaw Valley State	3	–	5	5	–	6
Northwood	1	–	7	1	–	10
Northern Michigan	0	–	8	1	–	9
$ – Conference champion; ^ – NCAA Division II playoff participant; Rankings from AFCA poll

The 2019 Northern Michigan Wildcats football team represented Northern Michigan University as a member of the Great Lakes Intercollegiate Athletic Conference (GLIAC) during the 2019 NCAA Division II football season. In their second year under head coach Kyle Nystrom, the Wildcats compiled a 1–9 record (0–8 in conference games), finished in last place in the GLIAC, and were outscored by a total of 319 to 152.

=== Schedule ===
Date	Time	Opponent	Site	Result	Attendance	Source
9/7/2019	1:00 p.m.	McKendree*	Superior Dome; Marquette, MI	W 30–9	2,115	
9/14/2019	7:00 p.m.	at UT Permian Basin*	Grande Communications Stadium; Midland, TX	L 24–40	4,701	
9/21/2019	1:00 p.m.	Davenport	Superior Dome; Marquette, MI	L 7–21	3,611	
9/28/2019	3:00 p.m.	at No. 2 Ferris State	Top Taggart Field; Big Rapids, MI	L 10–38	5,412	
10/5/2019	1:00 p.m.	Wayne State (MI)	Superior Dome; Marquette, MI	L 14–27	2,533	
10/12/2019	1:00 p.m.	at Michigan Tech	Sherman Field; Houghton, MI (Miner's Cup)	L 20–24	2,608	
10/19/2019	1:00 p.m.	No. 17 Grand Valley State	Superior Dome; Marquette, MI	L 17–45	2,685	
11/2/2019	1:00 p.m.	at Northwood	Hantz Stadium; Midland, MI	L 10–28	1,021	
11/9/2019	1:00 p.m.	Saginaw Valley State	Superior Dome; Marquette, MI	L 10–56	1,522	
11/16/2019	1:00 p.m.	at Ashland	Jack Miller Stadium; Ashland, OH	L 10–31	1,202	
*Non-conference game; Rankings from AFCA Poll released prior to the game; All times are in Eastern time
