= Ferris State Bulldogs football, 2010–2019 =

American college football season

2010–2019 Ferris State Bulldogs football
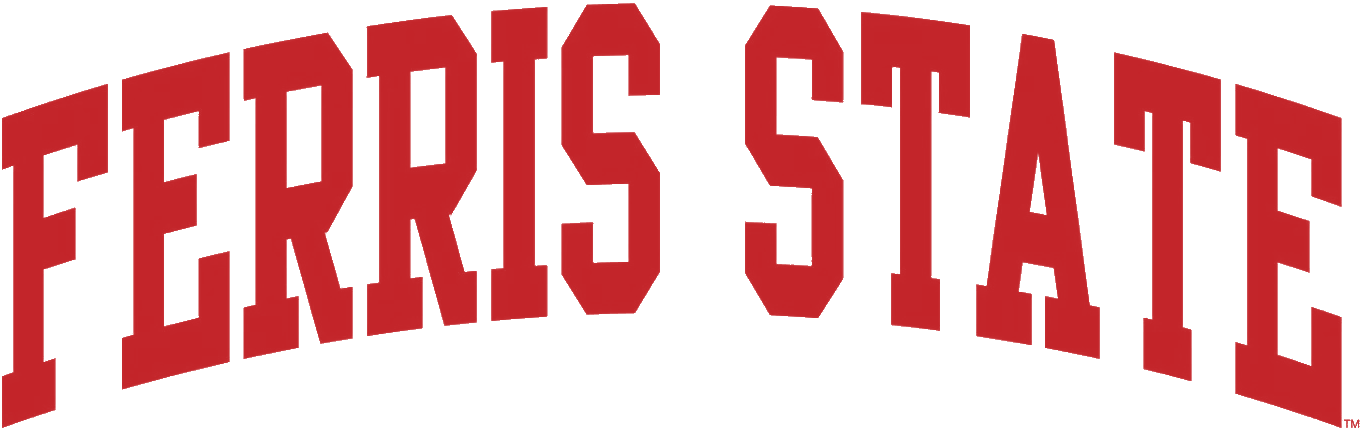
- Conference: Great Lakes Intercollegiate Athletic Conference
- Head coach: Jeff Pierce (1995–2011); Tony Annese (2012– )
- Home stadium: Top Taggart Field

The Ferris State Bulldogs football program, 2010–2019 represented Ferris State University during the 2010s in NCAA Division II college football as a member of the Great Lakes Intercollegiate Athletic Conference (GLIAC). The team had two head coaches during the decade: Jeff Pierce, who held the post from 1995 to 2011, and Tony Annese, who took over in 2012 and remains the head coach as of 2025. Highlights of the decade included:

- Jason Vander Laan was the quarterback from 2012 to 2015 and won the Harlon Hill Trophy as the most valuable layer in Division II football in both 2014 and 2015.
- The 2018 Ferris State Bulldogs football team won its first 15 games and advanced through the NCAA Division II playoffs to the national championship game where it lost to Valdosta State by a 49–47 score. Quarterback Jayru Campbell won the 2018 Harlon Hill Trophy as the best player in Division II football.
- The 2019 Ferris State Bulldogs football team compiled its second consecutive undefeated regular season, ultimately losing to West Florida in the semifinals of the Division II playoffs. Quarterback Jayru Campbell led the team through the regular season, but missed the playoffs after suffering an ankle injury that required surgery.
- The Bulldogs won seven of ten Anchor–Bone Classic games with Grand Valley State. The teams also met twice in the Division II playoffs, Grand Valley winning in 2015 and Ferris State in 2016.

The team played its home games at Top Taggart Field in Big Rapids, Michigan.

== Decade overview ==
Year	Head coach	Overall record	Conf. record	Conf. rank	Points scored	Points against	Postseason result	AFCA ranking
2010	Jeff Pierce	5–6	5–5	T–3rd (North)	273	299		
2011	Jeff Pierce	6–5	5–5	T–6th (North)	309	272		
2012	Tony Annese	7–4	6–4	5th (North)	376	333		
2013	Tony Annese	8–3	8–2	2nd (North)	427	317		
2014	Tony Annese	11–1	10–0	1st	445	170	L, NCAA Division II second round	11
2015	Tony Annese	11–1	10–0	T–1st	535	265	L, NCAA Division II second round	6
2016	Tony Annese	12–3	9–2	2nd			L, NCAA Division II semifinal	5
2017	Tony Annese	11–2	8–1	2nd			L, NCAA Division II quarterfinal	5
2018	Tony Annese	15–1	8–0	1st	629	328	L, NCAA Division II championship game	2
2019	Tony Annese	12–1	8–0	1st			L, NCAA Division II semifinal	3
TOTAL		98–27						

== 2010 ==
2010 Ferris State Bulldogs football
- Conference: Great Lakes Intercollegiate Athletic Conference
- North Division
- Record: 5–6 (5–5 GLIAC)
- Head coach: Jeff Pierce (16th season)
- Home stadium: Top Taggart Field

2010 Great Lakes Intercollegiate Athletic Conference football standings
	Conf.			Overall
Team	W		L	W		L
North
No. 10 Grand Valley State $^	9	–	1	11	–	2
No. 25 Michigan Tech	8	–	2	8	–	2
Indianapolis	5	–	5	6	–	5
Ferris State	5	–	5	5	–	6
Northern Michigan	5	–	5	5	–	6
Northwood	5	–	5	5	–	6
Saginaw Valley State	4	–	6	4	–	7
South
No. 21 Wayne State (MI)	8	–	2	9	–	2
No. 16 Hillsdale ^	8	–	2	9	–	3
Ashland	7	–	3	8	–	3
Lake Erie	3	–	7	3	–	8
Ohio Dominican *	2	–	8	2	–	8
Findlay	1	–	9	1	–	10
Tiffin	0	–	10	1	–	10
$ – Conference champion; ^ – NCAA Division II playoff participant; * – Provisional NCAA Division II member; Rankings from AFCA poll

The 2010 Ferris State Bulldogs football team represented Ferris State University (GVSU) as a member of the Great Lakes Intercollegiate Athletic Conference (GLIAC) during the 2010 NCAA Division II football season. In their 16th season under head coach Jeff Pierce, the Bulldogs compiled a 5–6 record (5–5 in conference games), tied for third place in the GLIAC North Division, and were outscored by a total of 299 to 273.

In a pre-season coaches poll, Ferris State was picked to finish eleventh in the conference. The Bulldogs had been winless against GLIAC opponents in 2009.

The team's statistical leaders included Tom Schneider (1,741 passing yards, 36 points scored, 2,060 yards total offense), Mike Ryan (59 receptions for 657 yards), Skyler Stoker (471 rushing yards), and Matt Ryan (128 total tackles).

=== Schedule ===
Date	Opponent	Site	Result	Attendance	Source
September 3	at No. 16 Hillsdale*	Muddy Waters Stadium; Hillsdale, MI	L 17–35	2,977	
September 11	No. 16 Saginaw Valley State	Top Taggart Field; Big Rapids, MI	W 21–17	3,201	
September 18	at Ohio Dominican	Panther Field; Columbus, OH	W 34–28	1,750	
September 25	Tiffin	Top Taggart Field; Big Rapids, MI	W 52–28	2,657	
October 2	at Lake Erie	Jack Britt Memorial Stadium; Painesville, OH	W 22–12	1,586	
October 9	Findlay^{†}	Top Taggart Field; Big Rapids, MI	W 23–10	3,533	
October 16	at Northern Michigan	Superior Dome; Marquette, MI	L 20–22	3,773	
October 23	No. 1 Grand Valley State	Top Taggart Field; Big Rapids, MI (Anchor–Bone Classic)	L 0–41	3,256	
October 30	at Indianapolis	Key Stadium; Indianapolis, IN	L 33–37	2,397	
November 6	Michigan Tech	Top Taggart Field; Big Rapids, MI	L 16–28	2,216	
November 13	at Northwood	Hantz Stadium; Midland, MI	L 35–41	2,373	
*Non-conference game; ^{†}Homecoming; Rankings from AFCA Poll released prior to the game

== 2011 ==
2011 Ferris State Bulldogs football
- Conference: Great Lakes Intercollegiate Athletic Conference
- North Division
- Record: 6–5 (5–5 GLIAC)
- Head coach: Jeff Pierce (17th season)
- Home stadium: Top Taggart Field

2011 Great Lakes Intercollegiate Athletic Conference football standings
	Conf.			Overall
Team	W		L	W		L
North
Grand Valley State	7	–	3	8	–	3
Saginaw Valley State ^	7	–	3	7	–	4
Indianapolis	6	–	4	7	–	4
Michigan Tech	6	–	4	7	–	4
Ferris State	5	–	5	6	–	5
Northern Michigan	3	–	7	4	–	7
Northwood	1	–	9	2	–	9
South
Hillsdale $	8	–	2	8	–	3
No. 2 Wayne State (MI) ^	7	–	3	12	–	4
Ohio Dominican	6	–	4	7	–	4
Ashland	6	–	4	6	–	5
Findlay	6	–	4	6	–	5
Lake Erie	2	–	8	3	–	8
Tiffin	0	–	10	0	–	11
$ – Conference champion; ^ – NCAA Division II playoff participant; Rankings from AFCA poll

The 2011 Ferris State Bulldogs football team represented Ferris State University (GVSU) as a member of the Great Lakes Intercollegiate Athletic Conference (GLIAC) during the 2010 NCAA Division II football season. In their 17th and final season under head coach Jeff Pierce, the Bulldogs compiled a 6–5 record (5–5 in conference games), finished in sixth place in the GLIAC North Division, and outscored opponents by a total of 309 to 272.

The team's statistical leaders included Tom Schneider (2,370 passing yards), Mike Ryan (62 receptions, 783 yards), Skyler Stoker (586 rushing yards), kicker Victor Brodie (68 points scored) and Tayo Moss (118 total tackles).

=== Schedule ===
Date	Opponent	Site	Result	Attendance	Source
September 2	No. T–25 Hillsdale	Top Taggart Field; Big Rapids, MI	W 20–17	3,453	
September 10	at Saginaw Valley State	Wickes Stadium; University Center, MI	L 27–30	8,173	
September 17	Ohio Dominican	Top Taggart Field; Big Rapids, MI	W 35–13	2,988	
September 24	at Tiffin	Frost–Kalnow Stadium; Tiffin, OH	W 48–13	1,003	
October 1	Lake Erie	Top Taggart Field; Big Rapids, MI	W 38–14	2,615	
October 8	at Findlay	Donnell Stadium; Findlay, OH	L 35–43	1,002	
October 15	Northern Michigan	Top Taggart Field; Big Rapids, MI	W 35–6	3,241	
October 22	at Grand Valley State	Lubbers Stadium; Allendale, MI (Anchor–Bone Classic)	L 10–57	9,197	
October 29	Indianapolis	Top Taggart Field; Big Rapids, MI	L 17–24	2,075	
November 5	at Michigan Tech	Sherman Field; Houghton, MI	L 14–41	1,671	
November 12	Northwood	Top Taggart Field; Big Rapids, MI	W 30–14	2,011	
Rankings from AFCA Poll released prior to the game

== 2012 ==
2012 Ferris State Bulldogs football
- Conference: Great Lakes Intercollegiate Athletic Conference
- North Division
- Record: 7–4 (6–4 GLIAC)
- Head coach: Tony Annese (1st season)
- Offensive coordinator: Ryan Brady (1st season)
- Home stadium: Top Taggart Field

2012 Great Lakes Intercollegiate Athletic Conference football standings
	Conf.			Overall
Team	W		L	W		L
North
Grand Valley State	7	–	3	8	–	3
Saginaw Valley State	7	–	3	8	–	3
Michigan Tech	7	–	3	7	–	3
Hillsdale	7	–	3	7	–	4
Ferris State	6	–	4	7	–	4
Wayne State (MI)	5	–	5	5	–	5
Northwood	4	–	6	5	–	6
Northern Michigan	4	–	6	5	–	6
South
No. 9 Ashland $^	10	–	0	11	–	1
Ohio Dominican	7	–	3	8	–	3
Findlay	7	–	3	7	–	3
Lake Erie	3	–	7	3	–	8
Notre Dame (OH)	2	–	8	3	–	8
Tiffin	2	–	8	3	–	8
Walsh *	2	–	8	3	–	8
Malone *	1	–	9	1	–	9
$ – Conference champion; ^ – NCAA Division II playoff participant; * – Provisional NCAA Division II member; Rankings from AFCA poll

The 2012 Ferris State Bulldogs football team represented Ferris State University (GVSU) as a member of the Great Lakes Intercollegiate Athletic Conference (GLIAC) during the 2012 NCAA Division II football season. In their first season under head coach Tony Annese, the Bulldogs compiled a 7–4 record (6–4 in conference games), finished in fifth place in the GLIAC North Division, and outscored opponents by a total of 376 to 333.

At the end of the 2011 season, Jeff Pierce was fired as Ferris State's head coach. In December 2011, Annese was hired to take over as head coach. Annese had coached 22 years at the high school level with a 195–41 record, and, most recently, had led Grand Rapids Community College to the 2011 junior college national championship and a 30–4 record from 2009 to 2011.

Freshman quarterback Jason Vander Laan led the team in passing, rushing, and scoring. He completed 133 of 231 passes (57.6%) for 1,493 yards, 13 touchdowns, six interceptions, and a 125.2 passer efficiency rating. On the ground, he tallied 1,338 rushing yards on 247 carries (5.4 yards per carry). Vander Laan also scored 100 points on 16 rushing touchdowns and two two-point conversions. Vander Laan later won the Harlon Hill Trophy as the most valuable player in NCAA Division II in both 2014 and 2015.

Jake Lampman was the leading receiver with 44 catches for 717 yards. Tayo Moss led the defense with 116 total tackles. Brad Iskow led the team with 25-1/2 tackles for loss

=== Schedule ===
Date	Opponent	Site	Result	Attendance	Source
August 30	at No. 7 (NAIA) St. Francis (IL)*	Joliet Memorial Stadium; Joliet, IL	W 35–24	1,000	
September 8	at Lake Erie	Jack Britt Memorial Stadium; Painesville, OH	W 49–21	2,006	
September 15	No. 22 Ashland	Top Taggart Field; Big Rapids, MI	L 32–47	3,806	
September 22	Walsh	Top Taggart Field; Big Rapids, MI	W 20–14	2,178	
September 29	at No. 16 Saginaw Valley State	Harvey Randall Wickes Memorial Stadium; University Center, MI	L 24–31 ^{OT}	8,357	
October 6	at Grand Valley State	Lubbers Stadium; Allendale, MI (Anchor–Bone Classic)	W 40–24	13,456	
October 13	Hillsdale	Top Taggart Field; Big Rapids, MI	L 20–30	2,973	
October 20	No. 22 Michigan Tech	Top Taggart Field; Big Rapids, MI	W 56–49	2,291	
October 27	at Wayne State (MI)	Tom Adams Field; Detroit, MI	W 35–24	2,452	
November 3	Northwood	Top Taggart Field; Big Rapids, MI	L 33–38	2,407	
November 10	at Northern Michigan	Superior Dome; Marquette, MI	W 32–31	2,543	
*Non-conference game; Rankings from AFCA Poll released prior to the game

== 2013 ==
2013 Ferris State Bulldogs football
- Conference: Great Lakes Intercollegiate Athletic Conference
- North Division
- Record: 8–3 (9–2 GLIAC)
- Head coach: Tony Annese (2nd season)
- Offensive coordinator: Ryan Brady (2nd season)
- Defensive coordinator: Lou Esposito (1st season)
- Home stadium: Top Taggart Field

2013 Great Lakes Intercollegiate Athletic Conference football standings
	Conf.			Overall
Team	W		L	W		L
North
No. 22 Saginaw Valley State ^	9	–	1	9	–	3
Ferris State	8	–	2	8	–	3
No. 3 Grand Valley State ^	7	–	2	12	–	3
Michigan Tech	6	–	4	6	–	4
Hillsdale	5	–	4	5	–	6
Northern Michigan	3	–	7	3	–	7
Wayne State (MI)	3	–	7	3	–	8
Northwood	1	–	8	2	–	9
South
No. 12 Ohio Dominican $^	9	–	0	10	–	1
Findlay	6	–	3	8	–	3
Ashland	5	–	4	5	–	5
Lake Erie	3	–	6	4	–	7
Walsh	3	–	6	3	–	8
Malone	1	–	8	2	–	9
Tiffin	1	–	8	2	–	9
$ – Conference champion; ^ – NCAA Division II playoff participant; Rankings from AFCA poll

The 2013 Ferris State Bulldogs football team represented Ferris State University (GVSU) as a member of the Great Lakes Intercollegiate Athletic Conference (GLIAC) during the 2013 NCAA Division II football season. In their second season under head coach Tony Annese, the Bulldogs compiled an 8–3 record (9–2 in conference games), finished in second place in the GLIAC North Division, and outscored opponents by a total of 427 to 317.

For the second consecutive year, sophomore quarterback Jason Vander Laan led the team in passing, rushing, and scoring. He completed 140 of 224 passes (62.5%) for 1,741 yards, 15 touchdowns, nine interceptions, and a 141.8 passer efficiency rating. On the ground, he set a Division II record for quarterbacks with 1,607 rushing yards on 265 attempts for an average of 6.1 yards per carry. He also led the team in scoring with 126 points scored on 21 rushing touchdowns.

Jake Lampan was the team's leading receiver with 38 catches for 542 yards and five touchdowns. Marvin Robinson was the team's leading tackler with 50 solo tackles and 89 total tackles. Justin Zimmer led the team with 10-1/2 tackles for loss and 7-1/2 sacks.

=== Schedule ===
Date	Opponent	Site	Result	Attendance	Source
September 7	at No. 1 (FCS) North Dakota State	Gate City Bank Field at the Fargodome; Fargo, ND	L 10–56	18,979	
September 14	Lake Erie	Top Taggart Field; Big Rapids, MI	W 56–49	3,514	
September 21	at Ashland	Jack Miller Stadium; Ashland, OH	W 34–7	3,647	
September 28	at Walsh	Fawcett Stadium; Canton, OH	W 59–16	1,972	
October 5	Saginaw Valley State	Top Taggart Field; Big Rapids, MI	L 28–31	3,664	
October 12	No. 24 Grand Valley State	Top Taggart Field; Big Rapids, MI (Anchor–Bone Classic)	W 54–44	4,958	
October 19	at Hillsdale	Muddy Waters Stadium; Hillsdale, MI	L 38–45	1,303	
October 26	at Michigan Tech	Sherman Field; Houghton, MI	W 30–27	1,600	
November 2	Wayne State (MI)	Top Taggart Field; Big Rapids, MI	W 41–10	1,338	
November 9	at Northwood	Hantz Stadium; Midland, MI	W 42–10	1312	
November 16	Northern Michigan	Top Taggart Field; Big Rapids, MI	W 35–22	1634	
Rankings from AFCA Poll released prior to the game

== 2014 ==
2014 Ferris State Bulldogs football

GLIAC champion

NCAA Division II second round, L 33–46 vs. Ohio Dominican
- Conference: Great Lakes Intercollegiate Athletic Conference

Ranking
- AFCA: No. 11
- Record: 11–1 (10–0 GLIAC)
- Head coach: Tony Annese (3rd season)
- Defensive coordinator: Ryan Brady (1st season)
- Home stadium: Top Taggart Field

2014 Great Lakes Intercollegiate Athletic Conference football standings
	Conf.			Overall
Team	W		L	W		L
No. 11 Ferris State $^	10	–	0	11	–	1
No. 4 Ohio Dominican ^	9	–	1	11	–	2
No. 21 Michigan Tech ^	9	–	1	9	–	2
Ashland	8	–	2	8	–	2
Wayne State (MI)	6	–	4	7	–	4
Grand Valley State	6	–	4	6	–	5
Findlay	4	–	6	5	–	6
Northwood	4	–	6	5	–	6
Tiffin	4	–	6	5	–	6
Hillsdale	4	–	6	4	–	7
Lake Erie	3	–	7	4	–	7
Walsh	3	–	7	4	–	7
Northern Michigan	2	–	8	3	–	8
Saginaw Valley State	2	–	8	2	–	9
Malone	1	–	9	1	–	10
$ – Conference champion; ^ – NCAA Division II playoff participant; Rankings from AFCA poll

The 2014 Ferris State Bulldogs football team represented Ferris State University (GVSU) as a member of the Great Lakes Intercollegiate Athletic Conference (GLIAC) during the 2014 NCAA Division II football season. In their third season under head coach Tony Annese, the Bulldogs compiled an 11–1 overall record (11–0 regular season, 10–0 in conference games), won the GLIAC championship for the first time since 1999 (and the first outright title since 1996), and outscored opponents by a total of 445 to 170. They participated in the 2014 NCAA Division II playoffs for the first time since 1996. They received a bye in the first round and lost to Ohio Dominican in the second round. Annese was selected as the GLIAC coach of the year and was credited with reviving the Ferris State football program.

Junior quarterback Jason Vander Laan won the Harlon Hill Trophy as the most valuable player in Division II. He completed 183 of 275 passes for 2,381 yards, 30 touchdowns and a 177.8 passing efficiency rating. On the ground, he tallied 1,466 rushing yards, the most by a quarterback in Division II during the 2014 season. He was also responsible for 300 of the team's 445 points with 50 combined passing and rushing touchdowns.

=== Schedule ===
Date	Opponent	Rank	Site	Result	Attendance	Source
September 4	at McKendree*		Leemon Field; Lebanon, IL	W 75–14	1,353	
September 13	at Northwood	No. 24	Hantz Stadium; Midland, MI	W 27–7	2,125	
September 20	Grand Valley State	No. 14	Top Taggart Field; Big Rapids, MI (Anchor–Bone Classic)	W 42–17	5,869	
September 27	at Saginaw Valley State	No. 14	Harvey Randall Wickes Memorial Stadium; University Center, MI	W 47–13	6,250	
October 4	Findlay	No. 13	Top Taggart Field; Big Rapids, MI	W 49–21	3,240	
October 11	Tiffin	No. 13	Top Taggart Field; Big Rapids, MI	W 68–20	2,250	
October 18	at No. 7 Ohio Dominican	No. 11	Panther Stadium; Columbus, OH	W 34–19	1,853	
October 25	at No. 13 Michigan Tech	No. 6	Sherman Field; Houghton, MI	W 37–3	2,648	
November 1	Lake Erie	No. 5	Top Taggart Field; Big Rapids, MI	W 66–56	1,899	
November 8	Northern Michigan	No. 4	Top Taggart Field; Big Rapids, MI	W 35–17	2,465	
November 15	at Walsh	No. 4	Fawcett Stadium; Canton, OH	W 46–42	1,342	
November 29	No. 9 Ohio Dominican	No. 4	Top Taggart Field; Big Rapids, MI (NCAA Division II second round)	L 33–46	2,598	
*Non-conference game; Rankings from AFCA Poll released prior to the game

== 2015 ==
2015 Ferris State Bulldogs football

GLIAC co-champion

NCAA Division II second round, L 34–38 vs. Grand Valley State
- Conference: Great Lakes Intercollegiate Athletic Conference

Ranking
- AFCA: No. 6
- Record: 11–1 (10–0 GLIAC)
- Head coach: Tony Annese (4th season)
- Co-defensive coordinators: Ryan Brady (2nd season); Kyle Nystrom (1st season)
- Home stadium: Top Taggart Field

2015 Great Lakes Intercollegiate Athletic Conference football standings
	Conf.			Overall
Team	W		L	W		L
No. 6 Ferris State +^	10	–	0	11	–	1
No. 10 Ashland +^	10	–	0	10	–	1
No. 4 Grand Valley State ^	8	–	2	12	–	3
Ohio Dominican	7	–	3	8	–	3
Michigan Tech	7	–	3	7	–	3
Findlay	5	–	5	6	–	5
Wayne State (MI)	5	–	5	6	–	5
Hillsdale	5	–	5	5	–	6
Northwood	5	–	5	5	–	6
Northern Michigan	4	–	6	5	–	6
Tiffin	4	–	6	5	–	6
Walsh	2	–	8	2	–	8
Lake Erie	2	–	8	2	–	9
Saginaw Valley State	1	–	9	1	–	10
Malone	0	–	10	0	–	10
$ – Conference champion; ^ – NCAA Division II playoff participant; Rankings from AFCA poll

The 2015 Ferris State Bulldogs football team represented Ferris State University (GVSU) as a member of the Great Lakes Intercollegiate Athletic Conference (GLIAC) during the 2015 NCAA Division II football season. In their fourth season under head coach Tony Annese, the Bulldogs compiled an 11–1 overall record (10–0 regular season, 10–0 in conference games), tied with Ashland for the GLIAC championship, and outscored opponents by a total of 535 to 265. The Bulldogs advanced to the NCAA Division II playoffs, defeating Texas A&M Commerce in the first round, then losing to Grand Valley State in the second round.

For the second consecutive year, senior quarterback Jason Vander Laan won the Harlon Hill Trophy as the most valuable player in Division II. The 2015 team also featured defensive lineman Justin Zimmer who was selected as a Division II All-American and later played several years in the National Football League.

=== Schedule ===
Date	Opponent	Rank	Site	Result	Attendance	Source
September 12	Northwood	No. 6	Top Taggart Field; Big Rapids, MI	W 40–3	5,976	
September 19	at No. 14 Grand Valley State	No. 5	Lubbers Stadium; Allendale, MI (Anchor–Bone Classic)	W 61–24	16,121	
September 26	Saginaw Valley State	No. 4	Top Taggart Field; Big Rapids, MI	W 35–18	6,577	
October 3	at Findlay	No. 4	Donnell Stadium; Findlay, OH	W 42–39	761	
October 10	at Tiffin	No. 4	Frost–Kalnow Stadium; Tiffin, OH	W 56–21	1,415	
October 17	Ohio Dominican	No. 4	Top Taggart Field; Big Rapids, MI	W 38–17	3,255	
October 24	No. 17 Michigan Tech	No. 4	Top Taggart Field; Big Rapids, MI	W 24–14	4,285	
October 31	at Lake Erie	No. 3	Jack Britt Memorial Stadium; Painesville, OH	W 70–19	352	
November 7	at Northern Michigan	No. 3	Superior Dome; Marquette, MI	W 49–39	2,557	
November 14	Walsh	No. 2	Top Taggart Field; Big Rapids, MI	W 38–7	3,461	
November 21	No. 20 Texas A&M–Commerce*	No. 2	Top Taggart Field; Big Rapids, MI (NCAA Division II first round)	W 48–30	2,236	
November 28	No. 12 Grand Valley State	No. 2	Top Taggart Field; Big Rapids, MI (NCAA Division II second round)	L 38–34	3,400	
*Non-conference game; Rankings from AFCA Poll released prior to the game

== 2016 ==
2016 Ferris State Bulldogs football

NCAA Division II semifinal, L 20–35 at Northwest Missouri State
- Conference: Great Lakes Intercollegiate Athletic Conference

Ranking
- AFCA: No. 5
- Record: 12–3 (9–2 GLIAC)
- Head coach: Tony Annese (5th season)
- Offensive coordinator: Ryan Brady (3rd season)
- Defensive coordinator: Kyle Nystrom (2nd season)
- Home stadium: Top Taggart Field

2016 Great Lakes Intercollegiate Athletic Conference football standings
	Conf.			Overall
Team	W		L	W		L
No. 4 Grand Valley State $^	10	–	0	12	–	1
No. 5 Ferris State ^	9	–	2	12	–	3
No. 19 Ashland	7	–	2	9	–	2
Tiffin	7	–	3	8	–	3
Ohio Dominican	7	–	4	7	–	4
Wayne State (MI)	7	–	4	7	–	4
Findlay	6	–	5	6	–	5
Saginaw Valley State	5	–	5	5	–	5
Hillsdale	4	–	5	5	–	5
Michigan Tech	4	–	6	4	–	6
Northern Michigan	3	–	7	3	–	8
Northwood	3	–	8	3	–	8
Walsh	0	–	10	1	–	10
Lake Erie	0	–	11	0	–	11
$ – Conference champion; ^ – NCAA Division II playoff participant; Rankings from AFCA poll

The 2016 Ferris State Bulldogs football team represented Ferris State University (GVSU) as a member of the Great Lakes Intercollegiate Athletic Conference (GLIAC) during the 2016 NCAA Division II football season. In their fifth season under head coach Tony Annese, the Bulldogs compiled a 12–3 overall record (– regular season, 9–2 in conference games), finished second in the GLIAC, and outscored opponents by a total of 563 to . The Bulldogs advanced to the NCAA Division II playoffs, defeating Midwestern State, Colorado Mines, and Grand Valley State, before losing to Northwest Missouri State in the semifinals.

=== Schedule ===
Date	Opponent	Rank	Site	Result	Attendance	Source
September 1	Ohio Dominican	No. 12	Top Taggart Field; Big Rapids, MI	W 41–0	5,085	
September 10	at Michigan Tech	No. 7	Sherman Field; Houghton, MI	W 30–28	1,830	
September 17	at Northwood	No. 6	Hantz Stadium; Midland, MI	W 27–26	2,008	
September 24	No. 5 Ashland^{†}	No. 7	Top Taggart Field; Big Rapids, MI	L 31–39	5,901	
October 1	at Findlay	No. 13	Donnell Stadium; Findlay, OH	W 20–17	1,507	
October 8	at No. 2 Grand Valley State	No. 14	Lubbers Stadium; Allendale, MI (Anchor–Bone Classic)	L 23–35	16,889	
October 15	Northern Michigan		Top Taggart Field; Big Rapids, MI	W 45–23	3,881	
October 22	Lake Erie	No. 25	Top Taggart Field; Big Rapids, MI	W 42–10	0	
October 29	No. 19 Wayne State (MI)	No. 22	Top Taggart Field; Big Rapids, MI	W 42–20	3,323	
November 5	at Hillsdale	No. 19	Frank "Muddy" Waters Stadium; Hillsdale, MI	W 41–20	1,376	
November 12	Saginaw Valley State	No. 18	Top Taggart Field; Big Rapids, MI	W 51–17	2,517	
November 19	No. 22 Midwestern State*	No. 15	Top Taggart Field; Big Rapids, MI (NCAA Division II first round)	W 65–34	996	
November 26	No. T–24 Colorado Mines*	No. 15	Top Taggart Field; Big Rapids, MI (NCAA Division II second round)	W 38–17	1,445	
December 3	at No. 2 Grand Valley State*	No. 15	Lubbers Stadium; Allendale, MI (NCAA Division II quarterfinal)	W 47–32	12,177	
December 10	at No. 1 Northwest Missouri State*	No. 15	Bearcat Stadium; Maryville, MO (NCAA Division II seminfinal)	L 20–35	5,264	
*Non-conference game; ^{†}Homecoming; Rankings from AFCA Poll released prior to the game

== 2017 ==
2017 Ferris State Bulldogs football

NCAA Division II quarterfinal, L 14–16 vs. Harding
- Conference: Great Lakes Intercollegiate Athletic Conference

Ranking
- AFCA: No. 5
- Record: 11–2 (8–1 GLIAC)
- Head coach: Tony Annese (6th season)
- Offensive coordinator: Steve Casula (1st season)
- Defensive coordinator: Ryan Brady (3rd season)
- Home stadium: Top Taggart Field

2017 Great Lakes Intercollegiate Athletic Conference football standings
	Conf.			Overall
Team	W		L	W		L
No. 10 Ashland $^	9	–	0	11	–	2
No. 5 Ferris State ^	8	–	1	11	–	2
Grand Valley State	7	–	2	8	–	3
Tiffin	5	–	4	6	–	5
Northwood	5	–	4	7	–	4
Wayne State (MI)	4	–	5	5	–	6
Michigan Tech	3	–	6	4	–	7
Saginaw Valley State	3	–	6	5	–	6
Northern Michigan	1	–	8	1	–	9
Davenport *	0	–	9	1	–	10
$ – Conference champion; ^ – NCAA Division II playoff participant; * – Provisional Division II member; Rankings from AFCA poll

The 2017 Ferris State Bulldogs football team represented Ferris State University (GVSU) as a member of the Great Lakes Intercollegiate Athletic Conference (GLIAC) during the 2017 NCAA Division II football season. In their fifth season under head coach Tony Annese, the Bulldogs compiled an 11–2 overall record (9–1 regular season, 8–1 in conference games), finished second in the GLIAC, and outscored opponents by a total of to . The Bulldogs advanced to the NCAA Division II playoffs, defeating Ouachita Baptist and Fort Hays State, before losing to Harding in the Super Region 3 regional championship game.

=== Schedule ===
Date	Opponent	Rank	Site	Result	Attendance	Source
September 9	at Findlay*	No. 2	Donnell Stadium; Findlay, OH	W 48–2	1,674	
September 16	Northern Michigan	No. 2	Top Taggart Field; Big Rapids, MI (Hall of Fame Game)	W 42–10	6,042	
September 23	at Ashland	No. 2	Ashland, OH	L 3–20	3,329	
September 30	Wayne State (MI)^{†}	No. 15	Top Taggart Field; Big Rapids, MI	W 59–17	6,449	
October 7	Tiffin	No. 15	Top Taggart Stadium; Big Rapids, MI	W 13–3	1,926	
October 14	at Saginaw Valley State	No. 15	Harvey Randall Wickes Memorial Stadium; University Center, MI	W 49–17	4,217	
October 21	No. 7 Grand Valley State	No. 12	Top Taggart Field; Big Rapids, MI (Anchor–Bone Classic)	W 28–27	7,489	
October 28	Northwood	No. 11	Top Taggart Field; Big Rapids, MI	W 24–14	3,275	
November 4	at Davenport	No. 12	Farmers Athletic Complex; Caledonia, MI	W 26–0	802	
November 11	at Michigan Tech	No. 11	Sherman Field; Houghton, MI	W 49–7	1,319	
November 18	No. 25 Ouachita Baptist*	No. 10	Top Taggart Field; Big Rapids, MI (NCAA Division II first round)	W 24–19	1,041	
November 25	at No. 4 Fort Hays State*	No. 10	Lewis Field Stadium; Hays, KS (NCAA Division II second round)	W 31–21	7,348	
December 2	Harding*	No. 10	Top Taggart Field; Big Rapids, MI (NCAA Division II quarterfinal)	L 14–16	2,250	
*Non-conference game; ^{†}Homecoming; Rankings from AFCA Poll released prior to the game

== 2018 ==
2018 Ferris State Bulldogs football

GLIAC champion

NCAA Division II Championship Game, L 47–49 vs. Valdosta State
- Conference: Great Lakes Intercollegiate Athletic Conference

Ranking
- AFCA: No. 2
- Record: 15–1 (8–0 GLIAC)
- Head coach: Tony Annese (7th season)
- Offensive coordinator: Steve Casula (2nd season)
- Defensive coordinator: Ryan Brady (4th season)
- Home stadium: Top Taggart Field

2018 Great Lakes Intercollegiate Athletic Conference football standings
	Conf.			Overall
Team	W		L	W		L
No. 2 Ferris State $^	8	–	0	15	–	1
No. 14 Grand Valley State ^	7	–	1	10	–	2
Ashland	6	–	2	6	–	4
Saginaw Valley State	5	–	3	8	–	3
Davenport *	3	–	5	6	–	5
Northwood	3	–	5	3	–	7
Michigan Tech	2	–	6	4	–	6
Northern Michigan	1	–	7	3	–	8
Wayne State (MI)	1	–	7	2	–	9
$ – Conference champion; ^ – NCAA Division II playoff participant; * – Provisional NCAA Division II member; Rankings from AFCA poll

The 2018 Ferris State Bulldogs football team represented Ferris State University (GVSU) as a member of the Great Lakes Intercollegiate Athletic Conference (GLIAC) during the 2018 NCAA Division II football season. In their seventh season under head coach Tony Annese, the Bulldogs compiled a 15–1 overall record (10–0 regular season, 8–0 in conference games), won the GLIAC championship, and outscored opponents by a total of 629 to 328. The Bulldogs won 15 consecutive games to start the season, including victories in the NCAA Division II playoffs over Harding, Northwest Missouri State, and Ouachita Baptist. They lost to Valdosta State in the Division II national championship game.

Junior quarterback Jayru Campbell won the 2018 Harlon Hill Trophy as the most valuable player in Division II. Campbell completed 187 of 310 passes (60.3%) for 2,931 yards, 27 touchdowns, six interceptions and a 164.6 passing efficiency rating. He also led the team in rushing (1,460 yards) and scoring (132 points on 21 rushing touchdowns and one receiving touchdown).

Other key players included freshman wide receiver Sy Barnett (43 receptions for 1,003 yards), sophomore running back Marvin Campbell (874 rushing yards), junior kicker J. Dieterle (74 of 75 on extra pints), and junior defensive end Austin Edwards (97 total tackles, 14 tackles for loss, eight sacks).

=== Schedule ===
Date	Opponent	Rank	Site	Result	Attendance	Source
August 30	East Stroudsburg*	No. 8	Top Taggart Field; Big Rapids, MI	W 49–17	4,714	
September 8	No. T–19 Findlay	No. 9	Top Taggart Field; Big Rapids, MI	W 59–13	4,217	
September 15	at Northwood	No. 6	Hantz Stadium; Midland, MI	W 53–10	1,965	
September 22	at Northern Michigan	No. 6	Superior Dome; Marquette, MI	W 35–19	4,642	
September 29	Ashland^{†}	No. 4	Top Taggart Field; Big Rapids, MI	W 28–21	4,618	
October 6	vs. Michigan Tech	No. 3	Fifth Third Ballpark; Comstock Park, MI	W 42–24	3,285	
October 13	at No. 2 Grand Valley State	No. 3	Lubbers Stadium; Allendale, MI (Anchor–Bone Classic)	W 35–31	16,563	
October 20	at Saginaw Valley State	No. 2	Wickes Stadium; University Center, MI	W 28–14	1,425	
October 27	Wayne State (MI)	No. 2	Top Taggart Field; Big Rapids, MI	W 38–28	3,013	
November 3	Davenport	No. 2	Top Taggart Field; Big Rapids, MI	W 41–17	3,014	
November 10	at William Jewell*	No. 2	Greene Stadium; Liberty, MO	W 47–6	409	
November 17	No. 7 Harding	No. 2	Top Taggart Field; Big Rapids, MI (NCAA Division II first round)	W 21–19	1,317	
November 24	No. 6 Northwest Missouri State	No. 2	Top Taggart Field; Big Rapids, MI (NCAA Division II second round)	W 27–21	2,078	
December 1	at No. 4 Ouachita Baptist	No. 2	Cliff Harris Stadium; Arkadelphia, AR (NCAA Division II quarterfinal)	W 37–14	2,078	
December 8	at No. 1 Minnesota State	No. 2	Blakeslee Stadium; 2Mankato, MN (NCAA Division II semifinal)	W 42–25	2,031	
December 15	vs. No. 3 Valdosta State	No. 2	McKinney Independent School District Stadium; McKinney, TX (NCAA Division II Championship Game)	L 47–49	4,306	
*Non-conference game; ^{†}Homecoming; Rankings from AFCA Poll released prior to the game

== 2019 ==
2019 Ferris State Bulldogs football

GLIAC champion

NCAA Division II semifinal, L 14–28 vs. West Florida
- Conference: Great Lakes Intercollegiate Athletic Conference

Ranking
- AFCA: No. 3
- Record: 12–1 (8–0 GLIAC)
- Head coach: Tony Annese (8th season)
- Home stadium: Top Taggart Field

2019 Great Lakes Intercollegiate Athletic Conference football standings
	Conf.			Overall
Team	W		L	W		L
No. 3 Ferris State $^	8	–	0	12	–	1
Wayne State (MI)	7	–	1	8	–	3
Ashland	6	–	2	7	–	4
Grand Valley State	5	–	3	8	–	3
Davenport	3	–	5	5	–	5
Michigan Tech	3	–	5	5	–	5
Saginaw Valley State	3	–	5	5	–	6
Northwood	1	–	7	1	–	10
Northern Michigan	0	–	8	1	–	9
$ – Conference champion; ^ – NCAA Division II playoff participant; Rankings from AFCA poll

The 2019 Ferris State Bulldogs football team represented Ferris State University (GVSU) as a member of the Great Lakes Intercollegiate Athletic Conference (GLIAC) during the 2019 NCAA Division II football season. In their eighth season under head coach Tony Annese, the Bulldogs compiled a 12–1 overall record (–0 regular season, 8–0 in conference games), won the GLIAC championship, and outscored opponents by a total of to . The Bulldogs opened the season with 12 consecutive victories, including playoff victories over Central Missouri and Northwest Missouri State. They lost in the NCAA Division II semifinals to national champion West Florida.

Senior quarterback Jayru Campbell, winner of the Harlon Hill Trophy in 2018, led the team through the regular season, but missed the playoffs after suffering an ankle injury that required surgery. He was replaced in the playoffs by Travis Russell, a senior from Grand Rapids.

The team's statistical leaders included Travis Russell (1,503 passing yards), junior running back Marvin Campbell (848 rushing yards), sophomore wide receiver Sy Barnett (34 receptions for 781 yards), and senior kicker J. Dieterle (87 points scored). Senior defensive end Austin Edwards was a first-team Division II All-American and won the Gene Upshaw Award as the best lineman in Division II.

=== Schedule ===
Date	Opponent	Rank	Site	Result	Attendance	Source
September 5	Findlay*	No. 2	Top Taggart Field; Big Rapids, MI	W 24–23	4,947	
September 14	at Central Washington*	No. 2	Tomlinson Stadium; Ellensburg, WA	W 62–28	5,818	
September 21	at Ashland	No. 2	Jack Miller Stadium; Ashland, OH	W 28–13	3,052	
September 28	Northern Michigan^{†}	No. 2	Top Taggart Field; Big Rapids, MI	W 38–10	5,412	
October 5	at Davenport	No. 2	Farmers Insurance Complex; Caledonia, MI	W 35–7	1,612	
October 12	at Wayne State (MI)	No. 2	Tom Adams Field; Detroit, MI	W 59–13	7,366	
October 19	Northwood	No. 2	Top Taggart Field; Big Rapids, MI	W 44–17	4,976	
October 26	Saginaw Valley State	No. 2	Top Taggart Field; Big Rapids, MI	W 34–10	3,404	
November 2	at Michigan Tech	No. 2	Kearly Stadium; Houghton, MI	W 52–0	1,280	
November 9	No. 14 Grand Valley State	No. 2	Top Taggart Field; Big Rapids, MI (Anchor–Bone Classic)	W 21–16	7,948	
November 30	No. 15 Central Missouri*	No. 2	Top Taggart Field; Big Rapids, MI (NCAA Division II second round)	W 37–10	-	
December 7	No. 10 Northwest Missouri State*	No. 2	Top Taggart Field; Big Rapids, MI (NCAA Division II quarterfinal)	W 25–3	1,837	
December 14	No. 20 West Florida*	No. 2	Top Taggart Field; Big Rapids, MI (NCAA Division II semifinal)	L 14–28	3,162	
*Non-conference game; ^{†}Homecoming; Rankings from AFCA Poll released prior to the game
