= Northwood Timberwolves football, 2010–2019 =

American college football season

2010–2019 Northwood Timberwolves football
- Conference: Great Lakes Intercollegiate Athletic Conference
- Head coach: Mike Sullivan (2008–2013); Pat Riepma (1993–2007, 2014); Leonard Haynes (2015–2019, 2021–2022)

The Northwood Timberwolves football program, 2010–2019 represented Northwood University during the 2010s in NCAA Division II college football as a member of the Great Lakes Intercollegiate Athletic Conference (GLIAC). The team, sometimes referred to as the "T-Wolves", was led during the decade by three head coaches: Mike Sullivan (2008–2013); Pat Riepma (1993–2007, 2014); and Leonard Haynes (2015–2019, 2021–2022). The Timberwolves compiled losing records in nine of the ten years during the 2010s. The lone winning season for the Timberwolves was 2017 when they compiled a 7–4 record and tied for fourth place in the GLIAC. The team played its home games at Hantz Stadium in Midland, Michigan.

== Decade overview ==
| Year | Head coach | Overall record | Conf. record | Conf. rank | Points scored | Points allowed | Delta | Playoffs |
|---|---|---|---|---|---|---|---|---|
| 2010 | Mike Sullivan | 5–6 | 5–5 | T-3 (North) | 313 | 355 | -42 | No |
| 2011 | Mike Sullivan | 2–9 | 1–9 | 7 (North) | 155 | 277 | -122 | No |
| 2012 | Mike Sullivan | 5–6 | 4–6 | 7 (North) | | | | No |
| 2013 | Mike Sullivan | 2–9 | 1–8 | 8 (North) | 243 | 357 | -114 | No |
| 2014 | Pat Riepma | 5–6 | 4–6 | T7 | 242 | 285 | -43 | No |
| 2015 | Leonard Haynes | 5–6 | 5–5 | T6 | 219 | 272 | -53 | No |
| 2016 | Leonard Haynes | 3–8 | 3–8 | 12 | 231 | 284 | -53 | No |
| 2017 | Leonard Haynes | 7–4 | 5–4 | T4 | 282 | 293 | -11 | No |
| 2018 | Leonard Haynes | 3–7 | 3–5 | T5 | 183 | 362 | -179 | No |
| 2019 | Leonard Haynes | 1–10 | 1–7 | 8 | 220 | 343 | -123 | No |
| TOTAL | | 38–71 | | | | | | |

== 2010 ==
2010 Northwood Timberwolves football
- Conference: Great Lakes Intercollegiate Athletic Conference
- North Division
- Record: 5–6 (5–5 GLIAC)
- Head coach: Mike Sullivan (3rd season)
- Home stadium: Hantz Stadium

2010 Great Lakes Intercollegiate Athletic Conference football standings
| | Conf. | | | Overall |
| Team | W | | L | W | | L |
|---|---|---|---|---|---|---|
North
| No. 10 Grand Valley State $^ | 9 | – | 1 | 11 | – | 2 |
| No. 25 Michigan Tech | 8 | – | 2 | 8 | – | 2 |
| Indianapolis | 5 | – | 5 | 6 | – | 5 |
| Ferris State | 5 | – | 5 | 5 | – | 6 |
| Northern Michigan | 5 | – | 5 | 5 | – | 6 |
| Northwood | 5 | – | 5 | 5 | – | 6 |
| Saginaw Valley State | 4 | – | 6 | 4 | – | 7 |
South
| No. 21 Wayne State (MI) | 8 | – | 2 | 9 | – | 2 |
| No. 16 Hillsdale ^ | 8 | – | 2 | 9 | – | 3 |
| Ashland | 7 | – | 3 | 8 | – | 3 |
| Lake Erie | 3 | – | 7 | 3 | – | 8 |
| Ohio Dominican * | 2 | – | 8 | 2 | – | 8 |
| Findlay | 1 | – | 9 | 1 | – | 10 |
| Tiffin | 0 | – | 10 | 1 | – | 10 |
$ – Conference champion; ^ – NCAA Division II playoff participant; * – Provisional Division II member; Rankings from AFCA poll

The 2010 Northwood Timberwolves football team represented Northwood University as a member of the Great Lakes Intercollegiate Athletic Conference (GLIAC) during the 2010 NCAA Division II football season. In their third year under head coach Mike Sullivan, the Timberwolves compiled a 5–6 record (5–5 in conference games), finished in a four-way tie for third place in the GLIAC's North Division, and were outscored by a total of 355 to 313.

Quarterback Aaron Shavers led the team in passing (1,194 yards), rushing (985 yards), total offense (2,179 yards), and scoring (60 points). He ranked fifth in total offense in the GLIAC. Other key players included Quillan Mathis (28 receptions for 655 yards), O'Neil Thomas (25 kick returns for 635 yards), kicker Pat Sijan (8-12 on field goals, 30-35 extra points), Tony Hite (31 punts, 40.9-yards average), and Andrew DeWeerd (95 total tackles, 10.5 tackles for loss).

Northwood finished 13th out of 14 GLIAC teams in total offense, giving up more than 400 yards and 32 points per game.

=== Schedule ===
| Date | Opponent | Site | Result | Attendance | Source |
|---|---|---|---|---|---|
| September 4 | at Wayne State (MI)* | Tom Adams Field; Detroit, MI | L 19–31 | 3,956 | |
| September 11 | at Ohio Dominican | Panther Field; Columbus, OH | W 28–12 | 1,750 | |
| September 18 | Northern Michigan | Hantz Stadium; Midland, MI | L 17–31 | 2,206 | |
| September 25 | Saginaw Valley State | Hantz Stadium; Midland, MI (Axe Bowl) | W 30–26 | 4,319 | |
| October 2 | at Ashland | Jack Miller Stadium; Ashland, OH | L 17–37 | 3,868 | |
| October 9 | at Indianapolis | Key Stadium; Indianapolis, IN | W 31–24 | 5,478 | |
| Oct 16 | Tiffin | Hantz Stadium; Midland, MI | W 51–27 | 2,612 | |
| October 23 | at Michigan Tech | Sherman Field; Houghton, MI | L 30–62 | 1,923 | |
| October 30 | No. 17 Hillsdale | Hantz Stadium; Midland, MI | L 28–35 | 1,573 | |
| November 6 | at No. 8 Grand Valley State | Lubbers Stadium; Allendale, MI | L 21–35 | 9,103 | |
| November 13 | Ferris State | Hantz Stadium; Midland, MI | W 41–35 | 2,373 | |
*Non-conference game; Rankings from AFCA Poll released prior to the game

== 2011 ==
2011 Northwood Timberwolves football
- Conference: Great Lakes Intercollegiate Athletic Conference
- North Division
- Record: 2–9 (1–9 GLIAC)
- Head coach: Mike Sullivan (4th season)
- Home stadium: Hantz Stadium

2011 Great Lakes Intercollegiate Athletic Conference football standings
| | Conf. | | | Overall |
| Team | W | | L | W | | L |
|---|---|---|---|---|---|---|
North
| Grand Valley State | 7 | – | 3 | 8 | – | 3 |
| Saginaw Valley State ^ | 7 | – | 3 | 7 | – | 4 |
| Indianapolis | 6 | – | 4 | 7 | – | 4 |
| Michigan Tech | 6 | – | 4 | 7 | – | 4 |
| Ferris State | 5 | – | 5 | 6 | – | 5 |
| Northern Michigan | 3 | – | 7 | 4 | – | 7 |
| Northwood | 1 | – | 9 | 2 | – | 9 |
South
| Hillsdale $ | 8 | – | 2 | 8 | – | 3 |
| No. 2 Wayne State (MI) ^ | 7 | – | 3 | 12 | – | 4 |
| Ohio Dominican | 6 | – | 4 | 7 | – | 4 |
| Ashland | 6 | – | 4 | 6 | – | 5 |
| Findlay | 6 | – | 4 | 6 | – | 5 |
| Lake Erie | 2 | – | 8 | 3 | – | 8 |
| Tiffin | 0 | – | 10 | 0 | – | 11 |
$ – Conference champion; ^ – NCAA Division II playoff participant; Rankings from AFCA poll

The 2011 Northwood Timberwolves football team represented Northwood University as a member of the Great Lakes Intercollegiate Athletic Conference (GLIAC) during the 2011 NCAA Division II football season. In their fourth year under head coach Mike Sullivan, the Timberwolves compiled a 2–9 record (1–9 in conference games), finished in last place in the GLIAC's North Division, and were outscored by a total of 277 to 155.

The Timberwolves gained 1,987 rushing yards and 788 passing yards for 2,775 yards of total offense. On defense, they gave up 1,965 rushing yards and 2,267 passing yards for a total of 4,232 yards. The team's individual leaders included Cameron Jackson (1,078 rushing yards, 48 points scored), Aaron Shavers (587 passing yards), Quillan Mathis (18 receptions, 378 yards), and Ryan Whittum (90 total tackles).

=== Schedule ===
| Date | Opponent | Site | Result | Attendance | Source |
|---|---|---|---|---|---|
| September 3 | Findlay* | Hantz Stadium; Midland, MI | W 14–10 | 1,943 | |
| September 10 | Ohio Dominican | Hantz Stadium; Midland, MI | L 30–44 | 1,520 | |
| September 17 | at Northern Michigan | Superior Dome; Marquette, MI | L 17–38 | 2,623 | |
| September 24 | at Saginaw Valley State | Wickes Stadium; University Center, MI (Axe Bowl) | L 20–28 | 7,726 | |
| October 1 | Ashland | Hantz Stadium; Midland, MI | L 3–6 | 1,791 | |
| October 8 | Indianapolis | Hantz Stadium; Midland, MI | L 7–38 | 1,031 | |
| October 15 | at Tiffin | Frost–Kalnow Stadium; Tiffin, OH | W 20–10 | 723 | |
| October 22 | Michigan Tech | Hantz Stadium; Midland, MI | L 10–24 | 1,331 | |
| October 29 | at Hillsdale | Muddy Waters Stadium; Hillsdale, MI | L 10–14 | 938 | |
| November 5 | Grand Valley State | Hantz Stadium; Midland, MI | L 10–35 | 1,117 | |
| November 12 | at Ferris State | Top Taggart Field; Big Rapids, MI | L 14–30 | 2,011 | |
*Non-conference game

== 2012 ==
2012 Northwood Timberwolves football
- Conference: Great Lakes Intercollegiate Athletic Conference
- North Division
- Record: 5–6 (4–6 GLIAC)
- Head coach: Mike Sullivan (5th season)
- Home stadium: Hantz Stadium

2012 Great Lakes Intercollegiate Athletic Conference football standings
| | Conf. | | | Overall |
| Team | W | | L | W | | L |
|---|---|---|---|---|---|---|
North
| Grand Valley State | 7 | – | 3 | 8 | – | 3 |
| Saginaw Valley State | 7 | – | 3 | 8 | – | 3 |
| Michigan Tech | 7 | – | 3 | 7 | – | 3 |
| Hillsdale | 7 | – | 3 | 7 | – | 4 |
| Ferris State | 6 | – | 4 | 7 | – | 4 |
| Wayne State (MI) | 5 | – | 5 | 5 | – | 5 |
| Northwood | 4 | – | 6 | 5 | – | 6 |
| Northern Michigan | 4 | – | 6 | 5 | – | 6 |
South
| No. 9 Ashland $^ | 10 | – | 0 | 11 | – | 1 |
| Ohio Dominican | 7 | – | 3 | 8 | – | 3 |
| Findlay | 7 | – | 3 | 7 | – | 3 |
| Lake Erie | 3 | – | 7 | 3 | – | 8 |
| Notre Dame (OH) | 2 | – | 8 | 3 | – | 8 |
| Tiffin | 2 | – | 8 | 3 | – | 8 |
| Walsh * | 2 | – | 8 | 3 | – | 8 |
| Malone * | 1 | – | 9 | 1 | – | 9 |
$ – Conference champion; ^ – NCAA Division II playoff participant; * – Provisional Division II member; Rankings from AFCA poll

The 2012 Northwood Timberwolves football team represented Northwood University as a member of the Great Lakes Intercollegiate Athletic Conference (GLIAC) during the 2012 NCAA Division II football season. In their fifth year under head coach Mike Sullivan, the Timberwolves compiled a 5–6 record (4–6 in conference games) and finished in a tie for seventh/last place in the GLIAC's North Division.

Senior Joe Bitterman played at wingback, safety and special teams.

=== Schedule ===
| Date | Time | Opponent | Site | Result | Attendance | Source |
|---|---|---|---|---|---|---|
| August 31 | 7:00 p.m. | Quincy* | Community Stadium; Midland, MI | W 54–31 | 2,803 | |
| September 8 | 12:00 p.m. | Walsh | Hantz Stadium; Midland, MI | W 28–16 | 1,120 | |
| September 15 | 7:00 p.m. | at Notre Dame (OH) | Korb Field; Lyndhurst, OH | W 49–14 | 1,498 | |
| September 22 | 1:30 p.m. | at Tiffin | Frost Kalnow Stadium; Tiffin, OH | W 35–14 | 1,411 | |
| September 29 | 12:00 p.m. | No. 18 Wayne State | Hantz Stadium; Midland, MI | L 11–21 | 2,219 | |
| October 6 | 12:00 p.m. | No. 15 Saginaw Valley State | Hantz Stadium; Midland, MI (Axe Bowl) | L 20–28 | 2,732 | |
| October 13 | 1:00 p.m. | at Michigan Tech^{†} | Sherman Field; Houghton, MI | L 21–28 | 2,295 | |
| October 20 | 7:00 p.m. | at No. 24 Grand Valley State | Lubbers Stadium; Allendale, MI | L 28–42 | 12,098 | |
| October 27 | 12:00 p.m. | Northern Michigan | Hantz Stadium; Midland, MI | L 13–21 | 1,012 | |
| November 3 | 1:00 p.m. | at Ferris State | Top Taggart Field; Big Rapids, MI | W 38–33 | 2,407 | |
| November 10 | 12:00 p.m. | Hillsdale | Hantz Stadium; Midland, MI | L 3–14 | 1,339 | |
*Non-conference game; ^{†}Homecoming; Rankings from AFCA Poll released prior to the game; All times are in Eastern time

== 2013 ==
2013 Northwood Timberwolves football
- Conference: Great Lakes Intercollegiate Athletic Conference
- North Division
- Record: 2–9 (1–8 GLIAC)
- Head coach: Mike Sullivan (6th season)
- Home stadium: Hantz Stadium

2013 Great Lakes Intercollegiate Athletic Conference football standings
| | Conf. | | | Overall |
| Team | W | | L | W | | L |
|---|---|---|---|---|---|---|
North
| No. 22 Saginaw Valley State ^ | 9 | – | 1 | 9 | – | 3 |
| Ferris State | 8 | – | 2 | 8 | – | 3 |
| No. 3 Grand Valley State ^ | 7 | – | 2 | 12 | – | 3 |
| Michigan Tech | 6 | – | 4 | 6 | – | 4 |
| Hillsdale | 5 | – | 4 | 5 | – | 6 |
| Northern Michigan | 3 | – | 7 | 3 | – | 7 |
| Wayne State (MI) | 3 | – | 7 | 3 | – | 8 |
| Northwood | 1 | – | 8 | 2 | – | 9 |
South
| No. 12 Ohio Dominican $^ | 9 | – | 0 | 10 | – | 1 |
| Findlay | 6 | – | 3 | 8 | – | 3 |
| Ashland | 5 | – | 4 | 5 | – | 5 |
| Lake Erie | 3 | – | 6 | 4 | – | 7 |
| Walsh | 3 | – | 6 | 3 | – | 8 |
| Malone | 1 | – | 8 | 2 | – | 9 |
| Tiffin | 1 | – | 8 | 2 | – | 9 |
$ – Conference champion; ^ – NCAA Division II playoff participant; Rankings from AFCA poll

The 2013 Northwood Timberwolves football team represented Northwood University as a member of the Great Lakes Intercollegiate Athletic Conference (GLIAC) during the 2013 NCAA Division II football season. In their sixth and final year under head coach Mike Sullivan, the Timberwolves compiled a 2–9 record (1–8 in conference games), finished in eighth/last place in the GLIAC's North Division, and were outscored by a total of 357 to 243.

=== Schedule ===
| Date | Opponent | Site | Result | Attendance | Source |
|---|---|---|---|---|---|
| September 7 | Slippery Rock* | Hantz Stadium; Midland, MI | L 36–51 | 2,007 | |
| September 14 | at Walsh | Fawcett Stadium; Canton, OH | L 14–25 | 1,565 | |
| September 21 | at Quincy* | Flinn Stadium; Quincy, IL | W 42–39 | 435 | |
| September 28 | Tiffin | Hantz Stadium; Midland, MI | W 26–11 | 1,891 | |
| October 5 | at Wayne State (MI) | Tom Adams Field; Detroit, MI | L 17–31 | 3,415 | |
| October 12 | at Saginaw Valley State | Wickes Stadium; University Center, MI (Axe Bowl) | L 28–44 | 11,425 | |
| October 19 | Michigan Tech | Hantz Stadium; Midland, MI | L 31–33 | 1,978 | |
| October 26 | Grand Valley State | Hantz Stadium; Midland, MI | L 17–23 | 2,612 | |
| November 2 | at Northern Michigan | Superior Dome; Marquette, MI | L 15–34 | 1,672 | |
| November 9 | Ferris State | Hantz Stadium; Midland, MI | L 10–42 | 1,312 | |
| November 16 | at Hillsdale | Muddy Waters Stadium; Hillsdale, MI | L 7–24 | 1,045 | |
*Non-conference game

== 2014 ==
2014 Northwood Timberwolves football
- Conference: Great Lakes Intercollegiate Athletic Conference
- Record: 5–6 (4–6 GLIAC)
- Head coach: Pat Riepma (1st season)
- Home stadium: Hantz Stadium

2014 Great Lakes Intercollegiate Athletic Conference football standings
| | Conf. | | | Overall |
| Team | W | | L | W | | L |
|---|---|---|---|---|---|---|
| No. 11 Ferris State $^ | 10 | – | 0 | 11 | – | 1 |
| No. 4 Ohio Dominican ^ | 9 | – | 1 | 11 | – | 2 |
| No. 21 Michigan Tech ^ | 9 | – | 1 | 9 | – | 2 |
| Ashland | 8 | – | 2 | 8 | – | 2 |
| Wayne State (MI) | 6 | – | 4 | 7 | – | 4 |
| Grand Valley State | 6 | – | 4 | 6 | – | 5 |
| Findlay | 4 | – | 6 | 5 | – | 6 |
| Northwood | 4 | – | 6 | 5 | – | 6 |
| Tiffin | 4 | – | 6 | 5 | – | 6 |
| Hillsdale | 4 | – | 6 | 4 | – | 7 |
| Lake Erie | 3 | – | 7 | 4 | – | 7 |
| Walsh | 3 | – | 7 | 4 | – | 7 |
| Northern Michigan | 2 | – | 8 | 3 | – | 8 |
| Saginaw Valley State | 2 | – | 8 | 2 | – | 9 |
| Malone | 1 | – | 9 | 1 | – | 10 |
$ – Conference champion; ^ – NCAA Division II playoff participant; Rankings from AFCA poll

The 2014 Northwood Timberwolves football team represented Northwood University as a member of the Great Lakes Intercollegiate Athletic Conference (GLIAC) during the 2014 NCAA Division II football season. Led by head coach Pat Riepma, the Tiberwolves compiled a 5–6 record (4–6 in conference games), finished in a four-way tie for seventh place in the GLIAC, and were outscored by a total of 285 to 242.

In November 2013, at the end of the season, Mike Sullivan stepped down as Northwood's head football coach. Riepma was immediately named to replace him. Riepma had been Northwood's head coach from 1993 to 2007, compiling a 90-68-2 record with four playoff appearances. In 2008, Riepma became the school's athletic director and held that position through the 2013 season. Riepma died from lung cancer in July 2015 at age 54.

=== Schedule ===
| Date | Opponent | Site | Result | Attendance | Source |
|---|---|---|---|---|---|
| September 6 | at Northern Michigan | Superior Dome; Marquette, MI | W 23–13 | 3,325 | |
| September 13 | Ferris State | Hantz Stadium; Midland, MI | L 7–27 | 2,125 | |
| September 20 | McKendree* | Hantz Stadium; Midland, MI | W 32–27 | 1,305 | |
| September 27 | at Wayne State (MI) | Tom Adams Field; Detroit, MI | L 27–45 | 3,334 | |
| October 4 | at Walsh | Fawcett Stadium; Canton, OH | W 24–13 | 1,350 | |
| October 11 | No. 22 Michigan Tech^{†} | Hantz Stadium; Midland, MI | L 6–21 | 3,054 | |
| October 18 | Findlay | Hantz Stadium; Midland, MI | W 35–33 | 1,620 | |
| October 25 | at Saginaw Valley State | Wickes Stadium; University Center, MI (Axe Bowl) | L 14–16 | 8,253 | |
| November 1 | Ohio Dominican | Hantz Stadium; Midland, MI | L 21–49 | 1,116 | |
| November 8 | at Hillsdale | Muddy Waters Stadium; Hillsdale, MI | L 21–49 | 919 | |
| November 15 | Malone | Hantz Stadium; Midland, MI | W 41–17 | 925 | |
*Non-conference game; ^{†}Homecoming; Rankings from Coaches' Poll released prior to the game

== 2015 ==
2015 Northwood Timberwolves football
- Conference: Great Lakes Intercollegiate Athletic Conference
- Record: 5–6 (5–5 GLIAC)
- Head coach: Leonard Haynes (1st season)
- Home stadium: Hantz Stadium

2015 Great Lakes Intercollegiate Athletic Conference football standings
| | Conf. | | | Overall |
| Team | W | | L | W | | L |
|---|---|---|---|---|---|---|
| No. 6 Ferris State +^ | 10 | – | 0 | 11 | – | 1 |
| No. 10 Ashland +^ | 10 | – | 0 | 10 | – | 1 |
| No. 4 Grand Valley State ^ | 8 | – | 2 | 12 | – | 3 |
| Ohio Dominican | 7 | – | 3 | 8 | – | 3 |
| Michigan Tech | 7 | – | 3 | 7 | – | 3 |
| Findlay | 5 | – | 5 | 6 | – | 5 |
| Wayne State (MI) | 5 | – | 5 | 6 | – | 5 |
| Hillsdale | 5 | – | 5 | 5 | – | 6 |
| Northwood | 5 | – | 5 | 5 | – | 6 |
| Northern Michigan | 4 | – | 6 | 5 | – | 6 |
| Tiffin | 4 | – | 6 | 5 | – | 6 |
| Walsh | 2 | – | 8 | 2 | – | 8 |
| Lake Erie | 2 | – | 8 | 2 | – | 9 |
| Saginaw Valley State | 1 | – | 9 | 1 | – | 10 |
| Malone | 0 | – | 10 | 0 | – | 10 |
$ – Conference champion; ^ – NCAA Division II playoff participant; Rankings from AFCA poll

The 2015 Northwood Timberwolves football team represented Northwood University as a member of the Great Lakes Intercollegiate Athletic Conference (GLIAC) during the 2015 NCAA Division II football season. In their first year under head coach Leonard Haynes, the Timberwolves compiled a 5–6 record (5–5 in conference games), finished in a four-way tie for sixth place in the GLIAC, and were outscored by a total of 272 to 219.

Northwood's head coach Pat Riepma died from lung cancer in July 2015 at age 54. Two weeks later, Northwood named Haynes as the interim head coach. Haynes had played for Northwood as a defensive lineman and was an assistant coach at the school for 20 years prior to being hired as interim head coach.

At the end of the 2015 season, Northwood removed the "interim" from Hayne's title and named him as the official head coach.

=== Schedule ===
| Date | Opponent | Site | Result | Attendance | Source |
|---|---|---|---|---|---|
| September 5 | Northern Michigan | Hantz Stadium; Midland, MI | W 20–7 | 3,005 | |
| September 12 | at Ferris State | Top Taggart Field; Big Rapids, MI | L 3–40 | 5,976 | |
| September 19 | at McKendree* | Leemon Field; Lebanon, IL | L 24–27 | 1,335 | |
| September 26 | Wayne State (MI) | Hantz Stadium; Midland, MI | W 31–13 | 2,011 | |
| October 3 | Walsh | Hantz Stadium; Midland, MI | W 16–7 | 1,205 | |
| October 10 | at Michigan Tech | Sherman Field; Houghton, MI | L 14–30 | 2,398 | |
| October 17 | at Findlay | Donnell Stadium; Findlay, OH | L 34–37 | 1,812 | |
| October 24 | Saginaw Valley State | Hantz Stadium; Midland, MI (Axe Bowl) | W 21–14 | 1,825 | |
| October 31 | at Ohio Dominican | Panther Stadium; Columbus, OH | L 14–48 | 1,377 | |
| November 7 | Hillsdale | Hantz Stadium; Midland, MI | L 14–28 | 1,611 | |
| November 14 | at Malone | Bob Commings Field; Canton, OH | W 28–21 | 1,200 | |
*Non-conference game

== 2016 ==
2016 Northwood Timberwolves football
- Conference: Great Lakes Intercollegiate Athletic Conference
- Record: 3–8 (3–8 GLIAC)
- Head coach: Leonard Haynes (2nd season)
- Home stadium: Hantz Stadium

2016 Great Lakes Intercollegiate Athletic Conference football standings
| | Conf. | | | Overall |
| Team | W | | L | W | | L |
|---|---|---|---|---|---|---|
| No. 4 Grand Valley State $^ | 10 | – | 0 | 12 | – | 1 |
| No. 5 Ferris State ^ | 9 | – | 2 | 12 | – | 3 |
| No. 19 Ashland | 7 | – | 2 | 9 | – | 2 |
| Tiffin | 7 | – | 3 | 8 | – | 3 |
| Ohio Dominican | 7 | – | 4 | 7 | – | 4 |
| Wayne State (MI) | 7 | – | 4 | 7 | – | 4 |
| Findlay | 6 | – | 5 | 6 | – | 5 |
| Saginaw Valley State | 5 | – | 5 | 5 | – | 5 |
| Hillsdale | 4 | – | 5 | 5 | – | 5 |
| Michigan Tech | 4 | – | 6 | 4 | – | 6 |
| Northern Michigan | 3 | – | 7 | 3 | – | 8 |
| Northwood | 3 | – | 8 | 3 | – | 8 |
| Walsh | 0 | – | 10 | 1 | – | 10 |
| Lake Erie | 0 | – | 11 | 0 | – | 11 |
$ – Conference champion; ^ – NCAA Division II playoff participant; Rankings from AFCA poll

The 2016 Northwood Timberwolves football team represented Northwood University as a member of the Great Lakes Intercollegiate Athletic Conference (GLIAC) during the 2016 NCAA Division II football season. In their second year under head coach Leonard Haynes, the Timberwolves compiled a 3–8 record (3–8 in conference games), finished in 12th place in the GLIAC, and were outscored by a total of 284 to 231.

=== Schedule ===
| Date | Opponent | Site | Result | Attendance | Source |
|---|---|---|---|---|---|
| September 3 | Wayne State (MI) | Hantz Stadium; Midland, MI | L 3–28 | 2,504 | |
| September 10 | at Saginaw Valley State | Wickes Stadium; University Center, MI | L 14–20 ^{OT} | 6,327 | |
| September 17 | Ferris State | Hantz Stadium; Midland, MI | L 26–27 | 2,008 | |
| September 24 | at Northern Michigan | Superior Dome; Marquette, MI | L 24–29 | 4,516 | |
| October 1 | Lake Erie | Hantz Stadium; Midland, MI | W 44–14 | 1,407 | |
| October 8 | at Ashland | Miller/Martinelli; Ashland, OH | L 7–45 | 4,027 | |
| October 15 | at Ohio Dominican | Panther Stadium; Columbus, OH | L 28–35 | 1,443 | |
| October 22 | Michigan Tech | Hantz Stadium; Midland, MI | W 17–3 | 2,105 | |
| October 29 | Tiffin | Hantz Stadium; Midland, MI | L 14–42 | 1,584 | |
| November 5 | at Findlay | Donnell Stadium; Findlay, OH | L 13–28 | 1,306 | |
| November 12 | at Walsh | Memorial Stadium; North Canton, OH | W 41–13 | 1,065 | |

== 2017 ==
2017 Northwood Timberwolves football
- Conference: Great Lakes Intercollegiate Athletic Conference
- Record: 7–4 (5–4 GLIAC)
- Head coach: Leonard Haynes (3rd season)
- Home stadium: Hantz Stadium

2017 Great Lakes Intercollegiate Athletic Conference football standings
| | Conf. | | | Overall |
| Team | W | | L | W | | L |
|---|---|---|---|---|---|---|
| No. 10 Ashland $^ | 9 | – | 0 | 11 | – | 2 |
| No. 5 Ferris State ^ | 8 | – | 1 | 11 | – | 2 |
| Grand Valley State | 7 | – | 2 | 8 | – | 3 |
| Tiffin | 5 | – | 4 | 6 | – | 5 |
| Northwood | 5 | – | 4 | 7 | – | 4 |
| Wayne State (MI) | 4 | – | 5 | 5 | – | 6 |
| Michigan Tech | 3 | – | 6 | 4 | – | 7 |
| Saginaw Valley State | 3 | – | 6 | 5 | – | 6 |
| Northern Michigan | 1 | – | 8 | 1 | – | 9 |
| Davenport * | 0 | – | 9 | 1 | – | 10 |
$ – Conference champion; ^ – NCAA Division II playoff participant; * – Provisional Division II member; Rankings from AFCA poll

The 2017 Northwood Timberwolves football team represented Northwood University as a member of the Great Lakes Intercollegiate Athletic Conference (GLIAC) during the 2017 NCAA Division II football season. In their third year under head coach Leonard Haynes, the Timberwolves compiled a 7–4 record (5–4 in conference games), tied for fourth place in the GLIAC, and were outscored by a total of 293 to 282. It was the program's first winning season since 2009.

=== Schedule ===
| Date | Opponent | Site | Result | Attendance | Source |
|---|---|---|---|---|---|
| September 2 | at Siena Heights* | O'Laughlin Stadium; Adrian, MI | W 38–7 | 1,395 | |
| September 9 | at Missouri S&T* | Allgood–Bailey Stadium; Rolla, MO | W 47–34 | 2,000 | |
| September 16 | Ashland | Hantz Stadium; Midland, MI | L 14–42 | 2,116 | |
| September 23 | at Grand Valley State | Lubbers Stadium; Allendale, MI | L 0–49 | 13,659 | |
| Spetmeber 30 | at Tiffin | Frost Kalnow Stadium; Tiffin, OH | L 28–31 | 3,150 | |
| October 7 | Michigan Tech | Hantz Stadium; Midland, MI | W 29–24 | 2,906 | |
| October 14 | at Wayne State (MI) | Tom Adams Field; Detroit, MI | W 20–10 | 3,114 | |
| October 21 | Davenport | Hantz Stadium; Midland, MI | W 33–30 ^{2OT} | 1,827 | |
| October 28 | at Ferris State | Top Taggart Field; Big Rapids, MI | L 14–24 | 3,275 | |
| November 4 | Saginaw Valley State | Hantz Stadium; Midland, MI | W 35–21 | 2,006 | |
| November 11 | at Northern Michigan | Superior Dome; Marquette, MI | W 24–21 | 1,576 | |
*Non-conference game

== 2018 ==
2018 Northwood Timberwolves football
- Conference: Great Lakes Intercollegiate Athletic Conference
- Record: 3–7 (3–5 GLIAC)
- Head coach: Leonard Haynes (4th season)
- Home stadium: Hantz Stadium

2018 Great Lakes Intercollegiate Athletic Conference football standings
| | Conf. | | | Overall |
| Team | W | | L | W | | L |
|---|---|---|---|---|---|---|
| No. 2 Ferris State $^ | 8 | – | 0 | 15 | – | 1 |
| No. 14 Grand Valley State ^ | 7 | – | 1 | 10 | – | 2 |
| Ashland | 6 | – | 2 | 6 | – | 4 |
| Saginaw Valley State | 5 | – | 3 | 8 | – | 3 |
| Davenport * | 3 | – | 5 | 6 | – | 5 |
| Northwood | 3 | – | 5 | 3 | – | 7 |
| Michigan Tech | 2 | – | 6 | 4 | – | 6 |
| Northern Michigan | 1 | – | 7 | 3 | – | 8 |
| Wayne State (MI) | 1 | – | 7 | 2 | – | 9 |
$ – Conference champion; ^ – NCAA Division II playoff participant; * – Provisional Division II member; Rankings from AFCA poll

The 2018 Northwood Timberwolves football team represented Northwood University as a member of the Great Lakes Intercollegiate Athletic Conference (GLIAC) during the 2018 NCAA Division II football season. In their fourth year under head coach Leonard Haynes, the Timberwolves compiled a 3–7 record (3–5 in conference games), tied for fifth place in the GLIAC, and were outscored by a total of 362 to 184.

=== Schedule ===
| Date | Opponent | Site | Result | Attendance | Source |
|---|---|---|---|---|---|
| September 1 | at Tiffin* | Frost Kalnow Stadium; Tiffin, OH | L 27–40 | 3,150 | |
| September 8 | Missouri S&T* | Hantz Stadium; Midland, MI | L 16–27 | 2,108 | |
| September 15 | Ferris State | Hantz Stadium; Midland, MI | L 10–53 | 1,965 | |
| September 22 | at Ashland | Ashland, OH | L 10–35 | 3,551 | |
| September 29 | Grand Valley State | Hantz Stadium; Midland, MI | L 7–52 | 2,103 | |
| October 6 | at Northern Michigan | Superior Dome; Marquette, MI | W 27–24 | 2,119 | |
| October 13 | Davenport | Hantz Stadium; Midland, MI | W 30–22 | 1,815 | |
| October 20 | at Wayne State (MI) | Tom Adams Field; Detroit, MI | L 21–55 | 1,816 | |
| November 3 | Saginaw Valley State | Hantz Stadium; Midland, MI (Axe Bowl) | L 10–31 | 1,988 | |
| November 10 | at Michigan Tech | Sherman Field; Houghton, MI | W 26–23 | 1,506 | |
*Non-conference game

== 2019 ==
2019 Northwood Timberwolves football
- Conference: Great Lakes Intercollegiate Athletic Conference
- Record: 1–10 (1–7 GLIAC)
- Head coach: Leonard Haynes (5th season)
- Home stadium: Hantz Stadium

2019 Great Lakes Intercollegiate Athletic Conference football standings
| | Conf. | | | Overall |
| Team | W | | L | W | | L |
|---|---|---|---|---|---|---|
| No. 3 Ferris State $^ | 8 | – | 0 | 12 | – | 1 |
| Wayne State (MI) | 7 | – | 1 | 8 | – | 3 |
| Ashland | 6 | – | 2 | 7 | – | 4 |
| Grand Valley State | 5 | – | 3 | 8 | – | 3 |
| Davenport | 3 | – | 5 | 5 | – | 5 |
| Michigan Tech | 3 | – | 5 | 5 | – | 5 |
| Saginaw Valley State | 3 | – | 5 | 5 | – | 6 |
| Northwood | 1 | – | 7 | 1 | – | 10 |
| Northern Michigan | 0 | – | 8 | 1 | – | 9 |
$ – Conference champion; ^ – NCAA Division II playoff participant; Rankings from AFCA poll

The 2019 Northwood Timberwolves football team represented Northwood University as a member of the Great Lakes Intercollegiate Athletic Conference (GLIAC) during the 2019 NCAA Division II football season. In their fifth year under head coach Leonard Haynes, the Timberwolves compiled a 1–10 record (1–7 in conference games), finished in eighth place in the GLIAC, and were outscored by a total of 343 to 220.

=== Schedule ===
| Date | Opponent | Site | Result | Attendance | Source |
|---|---|---|---|---|---|
| September 7 | Tiffin* | Hantz Stadium; Midland, MI | L 19–22 | 2,014 | |
| September 14 | at Findlay* | Donnell Stadium; Findlay, OH | L 21–31 | 1,761 | |
| September 21 | No. 10 Grand Valley State | Hantz Stadium; Midland, MI | L 3–27 | 1,704 | |
| September 28 | Ashland | Hantz Stadium; Midland, MI | L 28–31 | 1,437 | |
| October 5 | at Saginaw Valley State | Wickes Stadium; University Center, MI (Axe Bowl) | L 29–55 | 4,950 | |
| October 12 | Hillsdale | Hantz Stadium; Midland, MI | L 30–37 | 1,112 | |
| October 19 | at Ferris State | Top Taggart Field; Big Rapids, MI | L 17–44 | 4,976 | |
| October 26 | Wayne State (MI) | Hantz Stadium; Midland, MI | L 10–31 | 1,308 | |
| November 2 | Northern Michigan | Hantz Stadium; Midland, MI | W 28–10 | 1,021 | |
| November 9 | at Davenport | Farmers Insurance Complex; Caledonia, MI | L 14–21 | 1,344 | |
| November 16 | at Michigan Tech | Sherman Field; Houghton, MI | L 21–34 | 1,177 | |
*Non-conference game; Rankings from AFCA Poll released prior to the game
