= Chris Ostrowsky =

American football coach (born c. 1971)

Current position
- Title: Offensive coordinator & quarterbacks coach
- Team: Yale
- Conference: Ivy League

Biographical details
- Born: c. 1971 (age 54–55); Roselle Park, New Jersey, U.S.
- Education: New Jersey City College (1993)

Playing career
- 1989–1992: New Jersey City
- Position: Quarterback

Coaching career (HC unless noted)
- 1995–1996: Seton Hall Prep (NJ) (OC/QB)
- 1997–2001: East Side HS (NJ)
- 2002–2004: Washington and Lee (OC/QB)
- 2005–2006: Widener (AHC/OC/QB)
- 2007–2009: Northeastern (QB)
- 2010–2011: Northern Michigan (OC)
- 2012–2016: Northern Michigan
- 2017–2018: Central Michigan (OC/QB)
- 2019: Georgia Tech (off. advisor)
- 2021: Yale (off. assistant)
- 2022: Yale (AHC/WR)
- 2023–present: Yale (OC/QB)

Head coaching record
- Overall: 21–33 (college)

Christopher Ostrowsky (born c. 1971) is an American college football coach. He is the offensive coordinator and quarterbacks coach for the Yale University, a position he has held since 2023. He was the head football coach for East Side High School from 1997 to 2001 and Northern Michigan University from 2012 to 2016. He also coached for Washington and Lee, Widener, Northeastern, Central Michigan, and Georgia Tech.

Raised in Roselle Park, New Jersey, Ostrowsky played prep football at Roselle Park High School. He played quarterback for the New Jersey City Gothic Knights football team and graduated in 1993 with a degree in history.

== Head coaching record ==
=== College ===
| Year | Team | Overall | Conference | Standing | Bowl/playoffs |
|---|---|---|---|---|---|
Northern Michigan Wildcats (Great Lakes Intercollegiate Athletic Conference) (2012–2016)
| 2012 | Northern Michigan | 5–6 | 4–6 | T–7th (North) | |
| 2013 | Northern Michigan | 3–7 | 3–7 | T–6th (North) | |
| 2014 | Northern Michigan | 4–7 | 3–6 | T–13th | |
| 2015 | Northern Michigan | 5–6 | 4–6 | T–10th | |
| 2016 | Northern Michigan | 4–7 | 3–6 | 11th | |
| Northern Michigan: | | 21–33 | 17–31 | | |
| Total: | | 21–33 | | | |
