= Jason Vander Laan =

American football player (born 1992)

Rockford HS (MI)
- Title: Offensive coordinator / Tight end

Personal information
- Born: September 22, 1992 (age 34); Frankfort, Illinois, U.S.
- Listed height: 6 ft 3 in (1.91 m)
- Listed weight: 245 lb (111 kg)

Career information
- High school: Chicago Christian (Palos Heights, Illinois)
- College: Ferris State
- NFL draft: 2016: undrafted

Career history

Playing
- New York Jets (2016–2017)*; Indianapolis Colts (2017); Carolina Panthers (2018); New England Patriots (2019)*; New Orleans Saints (2019–2020)
- * Offseason or practice squad member only

Coaching
- Rockford HS (MI) (2021–present) Offensive coordinator

Awards and highlights
- 2× Harlon Hill Trophy (2014, 2015); No. 15 retired by Ferris State Bulldogs

Career NFL statistics
- Games played: 6
- Games started: 1
- Return yards: 8
- Tackles: 2
- Stats at Pro Football Reference

Jason Kenneth Vander Laan (born September 22, 1992) is an American former professional football player who was a tight end in the National Football League (NFL). He played college football as a quarterback for the Ferris State Bulldogs. Vander Laan was signed by the New York Jets as an undrafted free agent in 2016. After his playing career, he became the offensive coordinator for Rockford High School.

== College career ==
At Ferris State, Vander Laan set the NCAA all-divisions record for career rushing yards by a quarterback with 5,953. He also set the NCAA Division II record for rushing yards in a single season by a quarterback (1,607 in 2013). Also, at Ferris State he won 2 Harlon Hill Trophies, which is awarded to the best player in all of NCAA Division II.

On October 22, 2022, Vander Laan's No. 15 was retired by the Bulldogs.

=== College statistics ===
Year	Team	GP	Passing						Rushing			
Year	Team	GP	Comp	Att	Yds	TD	INT	Rate	Att	Yds	Avg	TD
2012	Ferris State	11	133	231	1,493	13	6	125.2	247	1,338	5.4	16
2013	Ferris State	11	140	224	1,741	15	9	141.8	265	1,607	6.1	21
2014	Ferris State	12	183	275	2,381	30	7	170.2	235	1,466	6.2	20
2015	Ferris State	12	210	320	2,625	27	7	158.0	263	1,542	5.9	24
Career		46	666	1,050	8,240	85	29	150.5	1,010	5,953	5.9	81

== Professional career ==
=== New York Jets ===
Vander Laan was signed by the New York Jets as an undrafted free agent on May 5, 2016. With the Jets, he converted from a quarterback to a tight end. He was released by the team on August 28. He was re-signed to the practice squad on December 20. Vander Laan signed a reserve/future contract with the Jets on January 2, 2017. He was waived by the Jets on September 3.

=== Indianapolis Colts ===
On November 3, 2017, Vander Laan was signed to the Indianapolis Colts' practice squad. He was promoted to the active roster on November 25. Vander Laan was waived by the Colts on May 7, 2018.

=== Carolina Panthers ===
On May 21, 2018, Vander Laan signed with the Carolina Panthers. He was waived on September 1, and signed to the practice squad the next day. Vander Laan was promoted to the active roster on December 19.

Vander Laan was waived during final roster cuts on August 30, 2019.

=== New England Patriots ===
On September 25, 2019, Vander Laan signed with the New England Patriots practice squad. On October 15, he was released by the Patriots.

=== New Orleans Saints ===
On October 23, 2019, Vander Laan was signed to the New Orleans Saints practice squad. He was promoted to the active roster on November 22. Vander Laan was placed on injured reserve on December 6, with a head injury.

Vander Laan chose to opt-out of the 2020 season due to the COVID-19 pandemic on July 28, 2020. He was waived after the season on February 12, 2021.

== Coaching career ==
On March 10, 2021, Vander Laan was hired by Rockford High School as an offensive coordinator.
