= Kyle Nystrom =

American football coach (born c. 1965)

Current position
- Title: Defensive coordinator & safeties coach
- Team: Lawrence Tech
- Conference: MSFA

Biographical details
- Born: c. 1965 (age 60–61)
- Education: Michigan State University (1988)

Coaching career (HC unless noted)
- 1983–1987: Michigan State (SA)
- 1988: Northern Michigan (GA)
- 1989: Western Michigan (GA)
- 1990: Western Michigan (OLB/P)
- 1991–1995: Western Michigan (OLB)
- 1996–2001: Western Michigan (ST/ILB)
- 2002–2004: TCU (LB)
- 2005: DePauw (AHC/DC/DB)
- 2006–2008: North Dakota State (AHC/ST/LB)
- 2009: Fort Hays State (DC/DB)
- 2010–2014: Central Michigan (AHC/ST/LB)
- 2015–2016: Ferris State (co-DC/LB)
- 2017–2022: Northern Michigan
- 2023: Wisconsin–Eau Claire (LB)
- 2024: Lawrence Tech (DC/LB)
- 2025–present: Lawrence Tech (DC/S)

Head coaching record
- Overall: 13–40

Kyle Nystrom (born c. 1965) is an American college football coach. He is the defensive coordinator and safeties coach for Lawrence Technological University, positions he has held since 2025. He was the head football coach for Northern Michigan University from 2017 to 2022. He also coached for Michigan State, Western Michigan, TCU, DePauw, North Dakota State, Fort Hays State, Central Michigan, Ferris State, and Wisconsin–Eau Claire.

== Head coaching record ==
| Year | Team | Overall | Conference | Standing | Bowl/playoffs |
|---|---|---|---|---|---|
Northern Michigan Wildcats (Great Lakes Intercollegiate Athletic Conference) (2017–2022)
| 2017 | Northern Michigan | 1–9 | 1–8 | 9th | |
| 2018 | Northern Michigan | 3–8 | 1–7 | T–8th | |
| 2019 | Northern Michigan | 1–9 | 0–8 | 9th | |
| 2020–21 | No team—COVID-19 | | | | |
| 2021 | Northern Michigan | 4–7 | 2–5 | T–5th | |
| 2022 | Northern Michigan | 4–7 | 1–5 | 6th | |
| Northern Michigan: | | 13–40 | 5–33 | | |
| Total: | | 13–40 | | | |
