= Miner's Cup =

| Teams | Northern Michigan Wildcats; Michigan Tech Huskies |
| Originated | 2002 (rivalry since 1920) |
| Trophy Series | Michigan Tech leads 21–3 |
| Current Holder | Michigan Tech |
| Northern Michigan (3); 2003 2007 2009 | Michigan Tech (21); 2002 2004 2005 2006; 2008 2010 2011 2012; 2013 2014 2015 2016; 2017 2018 2019 2021; 2022 2023 2024 2025; 2026 |

Locations in Michigan

The Miner's Cup is the trophy awarded to the winner of the college football game between the Northern Michigan University (NMU) Wildcats and the Michigan Technological University (Michigan Tech/MTU) Huskies. There has been a rivalry between the two teams since 1920, but the tradition of a "traveling trophy" between the two schools has only been around since 2002; Tech has won the trophy 21 out of a possible 24 times since the tradition was begun.

== History ==
A rivalry between the two universities has been around since 1920. Since then, they have met 99 times, with the series record at 53–41–5 in Michigan Tech's favor. The tradition of a "traveling trophy" did not begin until 2002, when Michigan Tech's Athletics Department and its Army ROTC Battalion combined to create it. The trophy itself is an antique miner's helmet mounted on a wooden base. The helmet was found at an antique store in the Houghton, Michigan area.

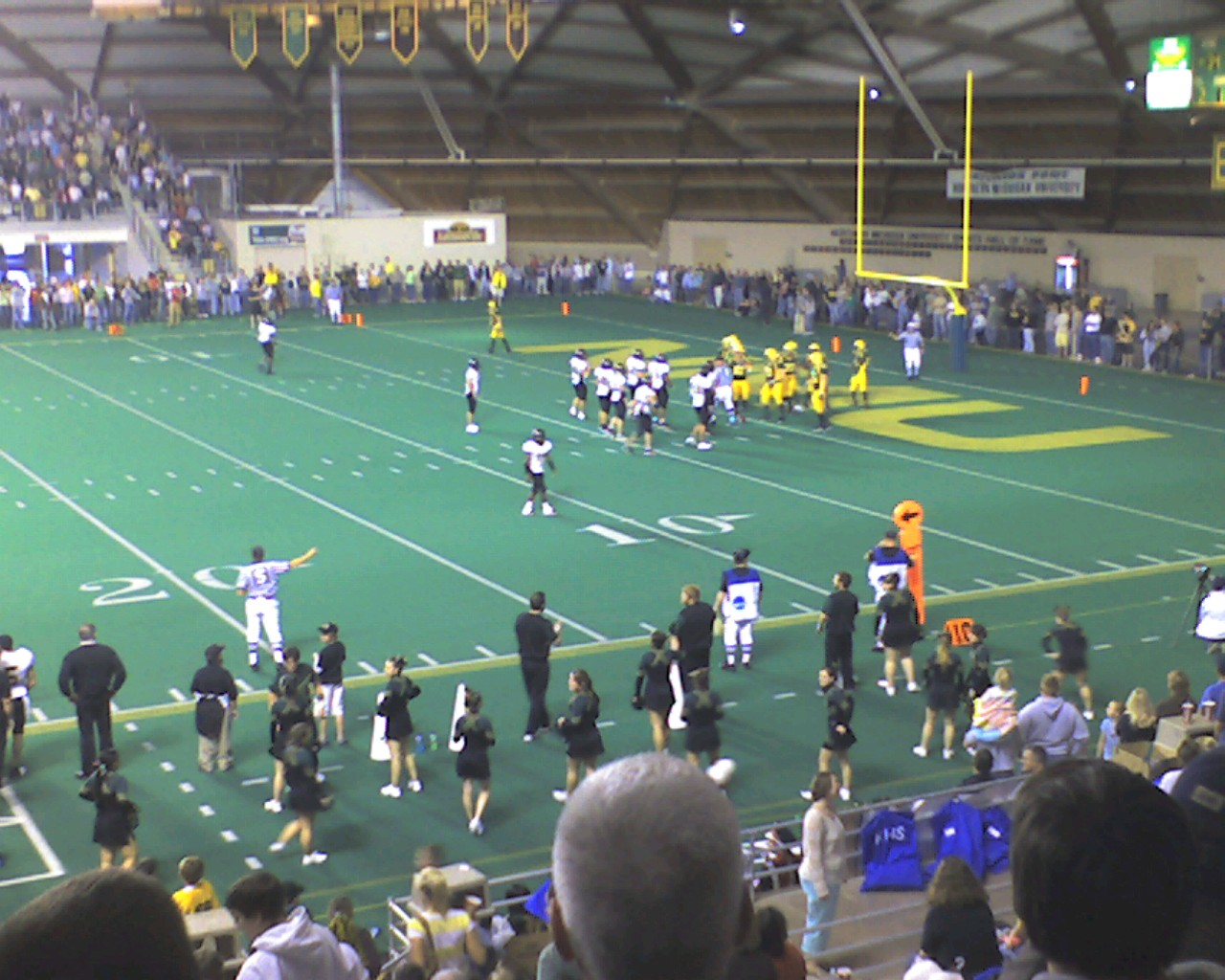
The Miner's Cup 2007 duel.

== Game results ==
| Northern Michigan victories | Michigan Tech victories | Tie games |

| No. | Date | Location | Winner | Score | Notes |
|---|---|---|---|---|---|
| 1 | 2002 | Houghton, MI | Michigan Tech | 34–13 | |
| 2 | 2003 | Marquette, MI | Northern Michigan | 35–24 | |
| 3 | 2004 | Houghton, MI | Michigan Tech | 45–6 | |
| 4 | 2005 | Marquette, MI | Michigan Tech | 42–21 | |
| 5 | 2006 | Houghton, MI | Michigan Tech | 42–14 | |
| 6 | 2007 | Marquette, MI | Northern Michigan | 34–27 | |
| 7 | 2008 | Marquette, MI | Michigan Tech | 47–21 | |
| 8 | 2009 | Houghton, MI | Northern Michigan | 48–16 | |
| 9 | 2010 | Houghton, MI | Michigan Tech | 12–0 | |
| 10 | 2011 | Marquette, MI | Michigan Tech | 21–18 | |
| 11 | 2012 | Marquette, MI | Michigan Tech | 41–17 | |
| 12 | 2013 | Houghton, MI | Michigan Tech | 31–7 | |
| 13 | 2014 | Marquette, MI | Michigan Tech | 34–31 | |
| 14 | 2015 | Houghton, MI | Michigan Tech | 24–23 | |
| 15 | 2016 | Marquette, MI | Michigan Tech | 51–45 | |
| 16 | 2017 | Houghton, MI | Michigan Tech | 28–21 | |
| 17 | 2018 | Marquette, MI | Michigan Tech | 35–33 | |
| 18 | 2019 | Houghton, MI | Michigan Tech | 24–20 | |
| 19 | 2021 | Marquette, MI | Michigan Tech | 21–14 | |
| 20 | 2022 | Houghton, MI | Michigan Tech | 21–7 | |
| 21 | 2023 | Marquette, MI | Michigan Tech | 62–0 | |
| 22 | 2024 | Houghton, MI | Michigan Tech | 39–9 | |
| 23 | 2025 | Marquette, MI | Michigan Tech | 56–17 | |
| 24 | 2026 | Houghton, MI | Michigan Tech | 56–33 | |
Series: Michigan Tech leads 21–3

== See also ==
- Superior Dome
- List of NCAA college football rivalry games
