= Sherman Field =

Coordinates: 47.11°N 88.55°W

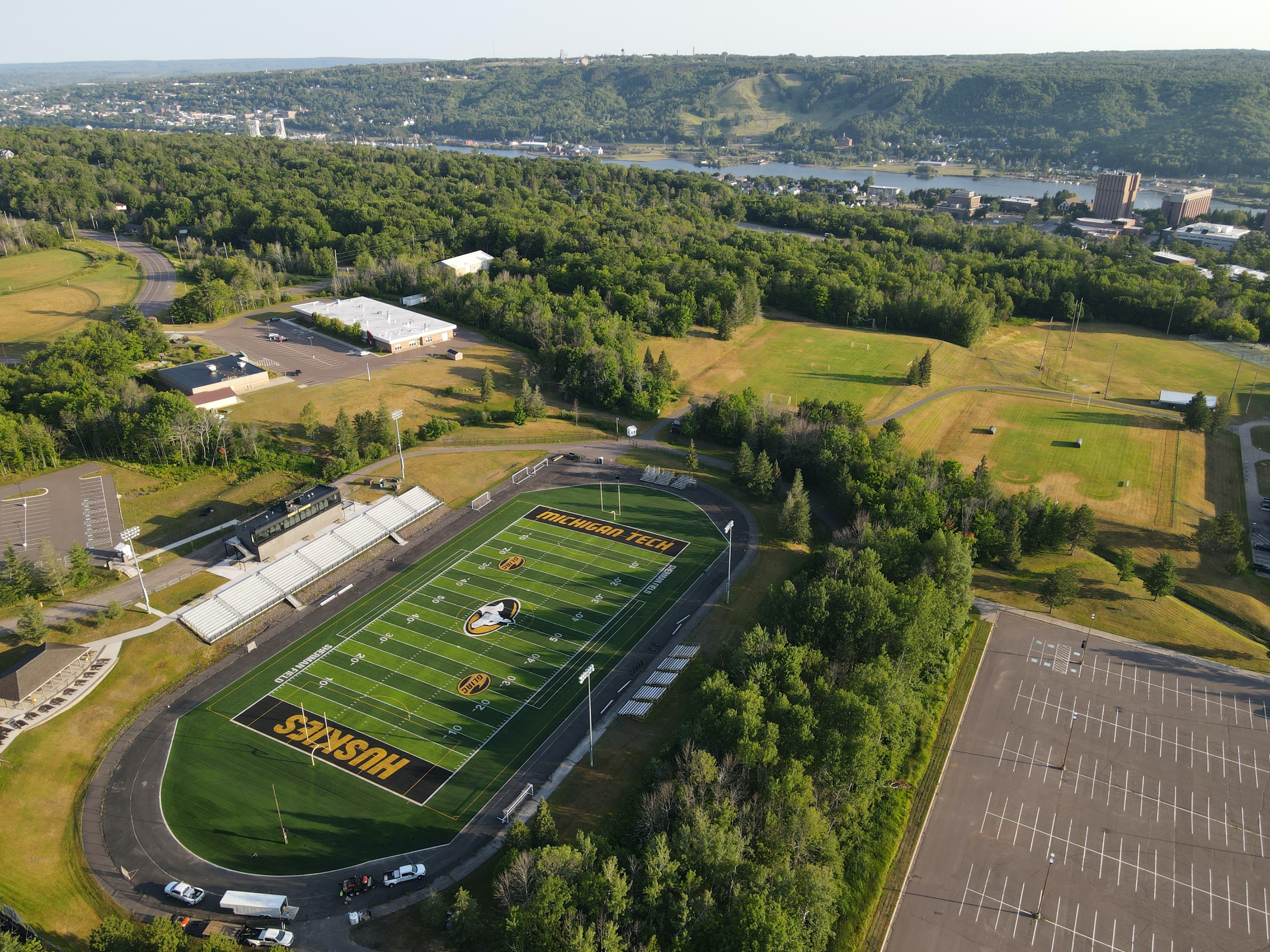
Kearly Stadium in Houghton, Mich. (2021)

Sherman Field at Kearly Stadium is a football stadium on the campus of Michigan Technological University, in Houghton, Michigan. It is the home of the Michigan Tech Huskies NCAA football team and the soccer team. It regularly seats 3,000 fans. The surface of the field was grass until 2008, when MTU announced that turf was being installed.

The field is named in honor of the late Donald P. Sherman, a former athletic director and coach at Michigan Tech. Sherman first arrived in 1929 at what was then known as the Michigan College of Mining and Technology. His first duties involved serving as the basketball coach and assistant athletic director. Sherman became athletic director in 1936 and was made a full professor of economics in 1943. Besides strengthening the four major varsity sports (hockey, football, basketball, and track), he also added three other sports (boxing, tennis, and skiing) to the Huskies’ athletic program. Sherman was also credited with initiating and developing Michigan Tech's first intramural sports program. His untimely death in 1946 from a heart attack after playing handball came as a great shock to the school and local community.

Sherman Field's largest crowd came on the first-ever night football game on September 29, 2012, against Grand Valley State. The 4,684 fans set a new Sherman Field record and also a record for the largest crowd at a home Michigan Tech sporting event.

In August 2018, Tech athletics completed phase one of the stadium project, which includes new bleacher seating for 2,100 fans and accessible parking along with concrete for the VIP Pavilion. Michigan Tech completed phase two that included an expanded press box, coaching boxes, additional bleachers, restrooms, and concessions in 2021. The current accommodations were completed in 1989.

For 2019, the facility was renamed Sherman Field at Kearly Stadium in honor of former coaches Ted and Tom Kearly (2006–19). Ted Kearly was the head coach from 1969 to 1972, compiling an overall record of 29–7, including three consecutive 8–1 seasons and three NIC Championships in four seasons. His son, Tom, was Tech's head coach for 11 seasons, spanning the 2006 through 2016 campaigns, and his career record stands at 70–44, with his winning percentage of .614 is the second highest in program history. Kearly guided the Huskies to a 9–2 overall record and the NCAA Playoffs in 2014. In 2012, Kearly led Tech to a 7–3 record and Great Lakes Intercollegiate Athletic Conference North Division title. On September 28, 2019, it was officially dedicated in a pregame ceremony of the season's home opener and homecoming game against Grand Valley State University.
