= Lake Erie Storm =

College sport team in Ohio

- University: Lake Erie College
- Conference: Great Midwest Athletic Conference
- NCAA: Division II
- Athletic director: Molly Hoffman
- Location: Painesville, Ohio
- Varsity teams: 15 (8 men's, 7 women's)
- Football stadium: Jack Britt Memorial Stadium
- Basketball arena: Jerome T. Osborne Family Athletic and Wellness Center
- Baseball stadium: Classic Park
- Softball stadium: Diamond 9 at Painesville Kiwanis Recreation Park
- Soccer stadium: Jack Britt Memorial Stadium
- Lacrosse stadium: Jack Britt Memorial Stadium
- Mascot: Stormy
- Nickname: Storm
- Colors: Green and white
- Website: lakeeriestorm.com
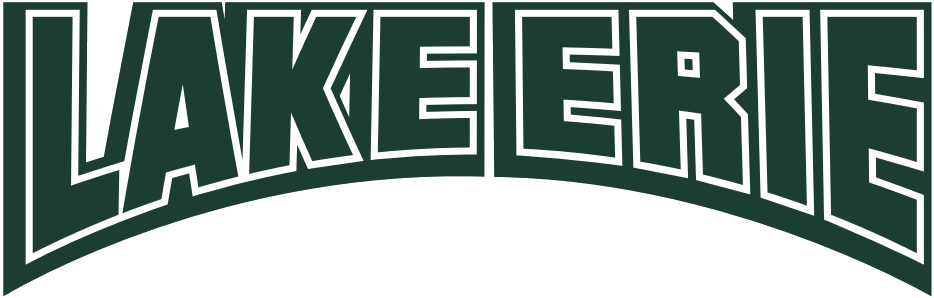

The Lake Erie Storm are the athletic teams that represent Lake Erie College, located in Painesville, Ohio, in intercollegiate sports as a member of the Division II level of the National Collegiate Athletic Association (NCAA), primarily competing in the Great Midwest Athletic Conference (G-MAC) since the 2017–18 academic year. The Storm previously competed as a member of the Great Lakes Intercollegiate Athletic Conference (GLIAC) from 2010–11 to 2016–17; as well as an NCAA D-II Independent from 2008–09 to 2009–10. Prior joining to NCAA Division II, the Storm competed as a member of the Allegheny Mountain Collegiate Conference (AMCC) of the NCAA Division III ranks from 1997–98 to 2007–08 (when it completed the process of moving to Division II at the conclusion of the 2008–09 academic year).

== History ==
Since joining the NCAA Division II ranks, Lake Erie student-athletes have earned 55 All-American honors and five conference championships along with three individual National Champions. The 2013–14 academic year has proved to be the most successful in the institution's history with six teams (baseball, men's lacrosse, men's swimming, men's indoor and outdoor track & field, and wrestling) earning top 25 national rankings or NCAA tournament bids. The program also recorded its highest-ever finish in the Learfield Directors' Cup Standings (79th), which placed it near the top 25% of all D-II programs in the country.

At various times in its history prior to joining the AMCC, Lake Erie competed as a member of the Association for Intercollegiate Athletics for Women (AIAW), the National Association of Intercollegiate Athletics (NAIA) and the National Small College Athletic Association (NSCAA). The College's softball team won the 1991 NSCAA National Championship.

A newly heated rivalry has begun with Ashland University, a two-hour drive away in Ashland, Ohio.

=== Nickname ===
The official nickname of the College's athletics teams is the Storm. The name was chosen to replace the nickname Unicorns when the College added men's intercollegiate athletics beginning in 1988. Their mascot is Stormy, the storm.

In 2010, Lake Erie College engaged in a legal dispute with a professional football club in Erie, Pennsylvania after that team took on the moniker "Erie Storm." As a result of the dispute, the professional team was rechristened the Erie Explosion, a name that remains with the team as of 2015.

== Varsity teams ==
Men's sports	Women's sports
Baseball	Basketball
Basketball	Cross country
Cross country	Lacrosse
Football	Soccer
Lacrosse	Softball
Soccer	Track and field
Track and field	Volleyball
Wrestling	

=== Baseball ===
In 1999, the baseball team was founded by then student, John Frame (‘02). Starting as a club team, they soon moved to Division III after great success and receiving school support and funding. Frame, a three sport NCAA athlete, was the driving force in delivering baseball to the LEC campus.

One of Lake Erie's All-Americans, baseball player Ryan Rua, was a 17th round draft pick of the Texas Rangers of Major League Baseball in 2011 – the first professional draft pick in school history. Rua made his major league debut with the Rangers on August 29, 2014 and ended his first call-up with a .295 batting average, two homeruns, and 14 runs batted in, in 28 appearances. Outfielder Luke Raley became the second Lake Erie player drafted when the Los Angeles Dodgers selected him in the seventh round of the 2016 MLB draft. For his career, Raley hit .379 with a .471 on-base percentage and a .654 slugging percentage. He totaled 160 hits with 121 runs, five triples, 31 doubles, 25 homeruns and 101 RBI.

=== Basketball ===
Lake Erie men's basketball enjoyed its most success competing as an NCAA Division III program. The 2005–06 team set a program record for victories with 25 and advanced to the AMCC Championship three years in a row with two Division III NCAA Tournament appearances.

=== Lacrosse ===
The Storm men's lacrosse program was a founding member of the East Coast Athletic Conference Division II Lacrosse League which formed in 2012 and played its first competitive season in 2013. In 2013, just its fourth year in competition, the men's lacrosse team reached the NCAA Division II Quarterfinals and junior Trevor Tarte led the nation in goal scoring. In 2015, the team reached the NCAA Division II Semifinals having defeated the University of Tampa in the first-ever Division II NCAA postseason event hosted on the Lake Erie campus. That season was marked by the team achieving the first-ever number one national ranking for any team in the history of the program. Men's lacrosse began play in the Great Midwest Athletic Conference in 2017.

=== Football ===
The Lake Erie varsity football program began in 2008 and has been highlighted by a number one national finish in total offense in 2013, the Harlon Hill finalist candidacy of running back Anthony Bilal in 2014 and the school's first-ever NFL signing in 2017. On his way to finishing third in the national player of the year balloting, Bilal rushed 254 times to gain 2,091 yards and score 29 rushing touchdowns. In May 2017, tight end and long snapper Anthony Kukwa became the first Storm student-athlete to sign an NFL contract, agreeing to a three-year undrafted free agent rookie contract with the Oakland Raiders. On December 15, 2020, Kukwa made his first official NFL regular season roster, by being signed to the 2020 Houston Texans Practice Squad.

=== Track and Field ===
In the spring of 2010 the Lake Erie track and field team boasted the first NCAA Division II All-Americans in school history when Ethan Snyder finished 7th in the nation in the 400 meter intermediate hurdles and Chris Burrows finished 8th in the nation in the 200 meter dash. Since that time, Lake Erie has had a successful run of individual accomplishments at the national level. Edward “Jamil” Dudley became the school's first national champion when he won the high jump at the 2012 NCAA Division II Outdoor Track and Field Championships. Dudley was also a national champion in the high jump and teammate Joe Postwaite was a national runner-up in the triple jump at the 2014 NCAA Division II Indoor Track and Field Championships.

=== Volleyball ===
The women's volleyball program has made great strides since the reorganizing of the program in 2015. After a 3-win season in 2014, the Storm have steadily improved their performance finishing 9-20 in the 2015 season and concluding a 19–16 campaign in 2016 that culminated in the program's first-ever postseason qualification and GLIAC conference tournament victory.

=== Wrestling ===
In 2013, wrestler Zak Vargo was the national runner-up at 157 pounds at the Division II Wrestling Championships. Vargo repeated his All-American performance at the 2014 Championships and was joined by freshman teammate Evan Rosborough, at 197 pounds. During the 2013–14 season, the team captured its first of three consecutive GLIAC Conference Championships and peaked at #16 in the national rankings, finishing 25th in the country at the Division II National Championships. In the 2014–15 school year, the team set a program record finish of 19th at Nationals. The 2015–16 season was marked by a program-best number six national ranking. And the 2016–17 season represented the sixth consecutive year in which the program sent at least one wrestler to Nationals, with five student-athletes qualifying.
