= Walsh Cavaliers =

College sport team in Ohio

- University: Walsh University
- Conference: G-MAC
- NCAA: Division II
- Athletic director: Christina Paone
- Location: North Canton, Ohio
- Varsity teams: 22 (11 men's, 11 women's)
- Football stadium: Larry Staudt Field
- Basketball arena: Cecchini Center
- Baseball stadium: Biery Stadium
- Softball stadium: WU Softball Complex
- Soccer stadium: Larry Staudt Field
- Lacrosse stadium: Larry Staudt Field
- Tennis venue: Klekotka Complex
- Volleyball arena: Cecchini Center
- Other venues: Klekotka Tennis Complex
- Mascot: Sir Walter the Cavalier
- Nickname: Cavaliers
- Colors: Maroon and gold
- Website: athletics.walsh.edu

The Walsh Cavaliers are the athletic teams that represent Walsh University, located in North Canton, Ohio, in NCAA Division II intercollegiate sporting competitions. The Cavaliers compete as members of the Great Midwest Athletic Conference for 22 of their current 27 varsity sports. Two sports were added in the 2023–24 school year—the all-female cheerleading discipline of STUNT, which the G-MAC first sponsored in 2022–23, and sprint football, a weight-restricted form of American football governed outside of the NCAA.

In 2024, Walsh University added men’s and women’s rugby after players and coaching staff from Notre Dame College chose Walsh as their new home.

== Varsity teams ==
Men's sports	Women's sports
Baseball	Basketball
Basketball	Bowling
Bowling	Cross country
Cross country	Golf
Football	Lacrosse
Golf	Rugby
Lacrosse	Soccer
Rugby	Softball
Soccer	Tennis
Tennis	Track and field
Track and field	Volleyball

== Facilities ==
Walsh's athletic facilities include:

Venue	Sport(s)	Open.
Cecchini Center	Basketball; Volleyball	2009
Biery Stadium	Baseball	1978
Klekotka Complex	Tennis	n/a
Larry Staudt Field	Football (Note: The university's football team used to play their home games at Tom Benson Hall of Fame Stadium, until they moved to Larry Staudt Field.); Soccer; Lacrosse; Track and field	n/a
WU Softball Complex	Softball	n/a
Vasco Field	(various) (Note: Practice and training facility. It was the lacrosse home venue until 2021.)	n/a

== Championships ==
Sport	Assoc.	Competition	Titles	Year(s)	Ref.
Basketball (men's)	NAIA	National championship – Div. II	1	2005	
Basketball (women's)	NAIA	National championship – Div. II	1	1998	

- The men's baseball team advanced to the 2007 NAIA World Series for the first time in school history.

=== Mascot and colors ===
Walsh University sports teams compete as the "Cavaliers". School colors are maroon and gold.

The school mascot is Sir Walter the Cavalier, who also makes appearances at various school events outside of athletics. A carved replica of Sir Walter stands outside the Cecchini Family Health and Wellness Complex and was created from an oak tree in 2016. The name Cavalier was chosen after the school newspaper, The Spectator, ran a contest in 1963, awarding Sean Keenan, Class of 1964, a $15 prize for his submission.
