= 2013 Eastern New Mexico Greyhounds football team =

American college football season

2013 Eastern New Mexico Greyhounds football

LSC co-champion
- Conference: Lone Star Conference
- Record: 7–3 (5–1 LSC)
- Head coach: Josh Lynn (2nd season)
- Offensive coordinator: Kelley Lee (2nd season)
- Offensive scheme: Gun option
- Base defense: 3–4
- Home stadium: Greyhound Stadium

2013 Lone Star Conference football standings
	Conf.			Overall
Team	W		L	W		L
Eastern New Mexico +	5	–	1	7	–	3
Tarleton State +	5	–	1	7	–	3
No. 11 West Texas A&M ^	4	–	2	11	–	3
Midwestern State	3	–	3	7	–	3
Texas A&M–Commerce #	2	–	4	7	–	5
Angelo State	2	–	4	5	–	6
Texas A&M–Kingsville	0	–	6	2	–	8
+ – Conference co-champions; ^ – NCAA Division II playoff participant; # – Live United Texarkana Bowl participant; Rankings from AFCA poll

The 2013 Eastern New Mexico Greyhounds football team represented Eastern New Mexico University during the 2013 NCAA Division II football season as a member of the Lone Star Conference (LSC). Led by second-year head coach Josh Lynn, the Greyhounds played home games at Greyhound Stadium in Clovis, New Mexico.

The Greyhounds finished the season with an overall record of 7–3, going 5–1 in LSC play to finish tied for first in the conference. Lynn was named the LSC Coach of the Year.

== LSC media poll ==
The LSC media poll was released on July 29, 2013. The Greyhounds were predicted to finish sixth in the conference.

== Schedule ==
Date	Time	Opponent	Site	Result	Attendance
September 7	7:00 p.m.	New Mexico Highlands*	Greyhound Stadium; Clovis, NM	L 28–31	1,353
September 13	12:00 p.m.	vs. Sul Ross*	AT&T Stadium; Arlington, TX (LSC Football Festival)	W 55–24	8,194
September 28	5:00 p.m.	at Incarnate Word*	Gayle and Tom Benson Stadium; San Antonio, TX	L 26–33	3,752
October 5	2:00 p.m.	No. 22 Tarleton State^{†}	Greyhound Stadium; Clovis, NM	L 14–34	2,312
October 12	5:00 p.m.	at Angelo State	San Angelo Stadium; San Angelo, TX	W 29–28	5,034
October 19	1:00 p.m.	at Northeastern State*	Doc Wadley Stadium; Tahlequah, OK	W 35–14	1,172
October 26	3:00 p.m.	Texas A&M–Kingsville	Greyhound Stadium; Clovis, NM	W 13–10	2,248
November 2	5:00 p.m.	at No. 15 West Texas A&M	Kimbrough Memorial Stadium; Canyon, TX (Wagon Wheel)	W 39–38	7,167
November 9	1:00 p.m.	No. 12 Midwestern State	Greyhound Stadium; Clovis, NM	W 40–21	2,192
November 16	1:00 p.m.	at Texas A&M–Commerce	Memorial Stadium; Commerce, TX	W 42–35	4,528
*Non-conference game; ^{†}Homecoming; Rankings from AFCA Poll released prior to the game; All times are in Mountain time

== Game summaries ==
=== New Mexico Highlands ===
	1	2	3	4	Total
Cowboys	7	14	3	7	31
Greyhounds	0	7	7	14	28

Statistics	NMHU	ENMU
First downs	16	21
Total yards	393	415
Rushing yards	211	162
Passing yards	182	253
Turnovers	3	3
Time of possession	24:42	35:18

Team	Category	Player	Statistics
New Mexico Highlands	Passing	Emmanuel Lewis	15/27, 182 yards, TD, INT
New Mexico Highlands	Rushing	Dominique Ferrell	14 rushes, 79 yards, 2 TD
New Mexico Highlands	Receiving	Ricky Marvray	6 receptions, 100 yards
Eastern New Mexico	Passing	Jeremy Buurma	18/31, 235 yards, INT
Eastern New Mexico	Rushing	Andrew Lopez	15 rushes, 88 yards, TD
Eastern New Mexico	Receiving	Jordan Wells	3 receptions, 83 yards

=== Vs. Sul Ross (LSC Football Festival) ===
	1	2	3	4	Total
Lobos	0	12	6	6	24
Greyhounds	0	20	14	21	55

Statistics	SRS	ENMU
First downs	19	23
Total yards	385	477
Rushing yards	298	348
Passing yards	87	129
Turnovers	5	3
Time of possession	30:18	29:42

Team	Category	Player	Statistics
Sul Ross	Passing	Derrick Bernard	8/19, 60 yards, TD, INT
Sul Ross	Rushing	Derrick Bernard	19 rushes, 101 yards, TD
Sul Ross	Receiving	Keyon Lee	5 receptions, 36 yards
Eastern New Mexico	Passing	Jeremy Buurma	7/12, 129 yards, TD
Eastern New Mexico	Rushing	Jordan Wells	8 rushes, 146 yards, TD
Eastern New Mexico	Receiving	Aaron Johnson	2 receptions, 75 yards, TD

=== At Incarnate Word ===
	1	2	3	4	Total
Greyhounds	7	2	7	10	26
Cardinals	10	16	0	7	33

Statistics	ENMU	UIW
First downs	20	15
Total yards	423	373
Rushing yards	262	203
Passing yards	161	170
Turnovers	3	2
Time of possession	32:12	27:48

Team	Category	Player	Statistics
Eastern New Mexico	Passing	Jeremy Buurma	9/25, 161 yards, TD
Eastern New Mexico	Rushing	Jordan Wells	15 rushes, 90 yards
Eastern New Mexico	Receiving	Jacob Johnson	3 receptions, 75 yards
Incarnate Word	Passing	Trent Brittain	11/30, 170 yards, TD, INT
Incarnate Word	Rushing	Junio Sessions	14 rushes, 144 yards, 2 TD
Incarnate Word	Receiving	Clint Killough	1 reception, 90 yards, TD

=== No. 22 Tarleton State ===
	1	2	3	4	Total
No. 22 Texans	7	17	3	7	34
Greyhounds	7	0	0	7	14

Statistics	TSU	ENMU
First downs	24	22
Total yards	398	401
Rushing yards	85	204
Passing yards	313	197
Turnovers	3	4
Time of possession	25:40	34:20

Team	Category	Player	Statistics
Tarleton State	Passing	Jake Fenske	27/50, 313 yards, 3 TD, 2 INT
Tarleton State	Rushing	Jerome Ragel	14 rushes, 55 yards
Tarleton State	Receiving	Andre Plata	6 receptions, 70 yards
Eastern New Mexico	Passing	Jeremy Buurma	9/22, 185 yards, TD
Eastern New Mexico	Rushing	Vaughn Johnson	13 rushes, 51 yards
Eastern New Mexico	Receiving	Jacob Johnson	6 receptions, 92 yards

=== At Angelo State ===
	1	2	3	4	Total
Greyhounds	0	6	12	11	29
Rams	21	7	0	0	28

Statistics	ENMU	ASU
First downs	23	19
Total yards	321	361
Rushing yards	164	206
Passing yards	157	155
Turnovers	4	3
Time of possession	32:02	27:58

Team	Category	Player	Statistics
Eastern New Mexico	Passing	Jeremy Buurma	10/17, 157 yards, 2 TD, INT
Eastern New Mexico	Rushing	Jeremy Buurma	27 rushes, 67 yards
Eastern New Mexico	Receiving	Jordan Wells	3 receptions, 84 yards, 2 TD
Angelo State	Passing	Kyle Washington	18/29, 155 yards, TD
Angelo State	Rushing	Kyle Washington	9 rushes, 87 yards, TD
Angelo State	Receiving	Joey Knight	7 receptions, 73 yards

=== At Northeastern State ===
	1	2	3	4	Total
Greyhounds	7	14	7	7	35
RiverHawks	7	0	0	7	14

Statistics	ENMU	NSU
First downs	23	16
Total yards	485	250
Rushing yards	368	109
Passing yards	117	141
Turnovers	1	1
Time of possession	29:18	30:42

Team	Category	Player	Statistics
Eastern New Mexico	Passing	Jeremy Buurma	6/7, 117 yards, TD
Eastern New Mexico	Rushing	Jordan Wells	8 rushes, 132 yards, TD
Eastern New Mexico	Receiving	Jacob Johnson	3 receptions, 72 yards, TD
Northeastern State	Passing	Thor Long	11/27, 141 yards, TD, INT
Northeastern State	Rushing	Steven Hopper	16 rushes, 62 yards
Northeastern State	Receiving	Cruz Williams	1 reception, 76 yards, TD

=== Texas A&M–Kingsville ===
	1	2	3	4	Total
Javelinas	3	0	7	0	10
Greyhounds	0	0	13	0	13

Statistics	TAMUK	ENMU
First downs	13	20
Total yards	203	330
Rushing yards	107	186
Passing yards	96	144
Turnovers	2	2
Time of possession	24:47	35:13

Team	Category	Player	Statistics
Texas A&M–Kingsville	Passing	Caleb Bedford	13/27, 89 yards, 2 INT
Texas A&M–Kingsville	Rushing	Greg Pitre	10 rushes, 38 yards
Texas A&M–Kingsville	Receiving	Robert Armstrong	6 receptions, 44 yards
Eastern New Mexico	Passing	Jeremy Buurma	14/18, 144 yards, INT
Eastern New Mexico	Rushing	E'lon Spight	15 rushes, 73 yards, TD
Eastern New Mexico	Receiving	Jacob Johnson	7 receptions, 80 yards

=== At No. 15 West Texas A&M ===
	1	2	3	4	Total
Greyhounds	0	17	7	15	39
No. 15 Buffaloes	14	17	7	0	38

Statistics	ENMU	WTAMU
First downs	24	23
Total yards	380	484
Rushing yards	232	12
Passing yards	148	472
Turnovers	1	1
Time of possession	33:02	26:58

Team	Category	Player	Statistics
Eastern New Mexico	Passing	Jeremy Buurma	8/16, 148 yards, TD
Eastern New Mexico	Rushing	Christian Long	27 rushes, 121 yards, 3 TD
Eastern New Mexico	Receiving	Ricky Milks	2 receptions, 49 yards
West Texas A&M	Passing	Dustin Vaughan	38/57, 472 yards, 5 TD, INT
West Texas A&M	Rushing	Geremy Alridge	2 rushes, 19 yards
West Texas A&M	Receiving	Torrence Allen	11 receptions, 158 yards, 2 TD

=== No. 12 Midwestern State ===
	1	2	3	4	Total
No. 12 Mustangs	0	14	7	0	21
Greyhounds	13	14	7	6	40

Statistics	MSU	ENMU
First downs	21	23
Total yards	356	428
Rushing yards	133	281
Passing yards	223	147
Turnovers	1	1
Time of possession	28:10	31:50

Team	Category	Player	Statistics
Midwestern State	Passing	Jake Glover	16/32, 188 yards, TD, INT
Midwestern State	Rushing	Keidrick Jackson	17 rushes, 87 yards, TD
Midwestern State	Receiving	Statron Jones	6 receptions, 100 yards, TD
Eastern New Mexico	Passing	Jeremy Buurma	5/11, 147 yards, TD
Eastern New Mexico	Rushing	E'lon Spight	15 rushes, 90 yards, 2 TD
Eastern New Mexico	Receiving	Jacob Johnson	4 receptions, 125 yards, TD

=== At Texas A&M–Commerce ===
	1	2	3	4	Total
Greyhounds	7	14	14	7	42
Lions	14	14	0	7	35

Statistics	ENMU	TAMUC
First downs	29	20
Total yards	422	435
Rushing yards	276	43
Passing yards	146	392
Turnovers	1	2
Time of possession	40:58	19:02

Team	Category	Player	Statistics
Eastern New Mexico	Passing	Jeremy Buurma	8/15, 146 yards, 3 TD
Eastern New Mexico	Rushing	D'majeric Tucker	14 rushes, 107 yards
Eastern New Mexico	Receiving	Jacob Johnson	5 receptions, 107 yards, 2 TD
Texas A&M–Commerce	Passing	Harrison Stewart	26/51, 392 yards, 5 TD, 2 INT
Texas A&M–Commerce	Rushing	Ki-Janaven Garrett	11 rushes, 40 yards
Texas A&M–Commerce	Receiving	Seth Smith	10 receptions, 175 yards, 3 TD
