= 2013 West Texas A&M Buffaloes football team =

American college football season

2013 West Texas A&M Buffaloes football

NCAA Division II Quarterfinal, L 28–35 at Grand Valley State
- Conference: Lone Star Conference

Ranking
- AFCA: No. 11
- Record: 11–3 (4–2 LSC)
- Head coach: Mike Nesbitt (interim; 1st season)
- Offensive coordinator: Stephen Lee (3rd season)
- Offensive scheme: Air raid
- Defensive coordinator: Nick Paremski (1st season)
- Base defense: 3–4
- Home stadium: Kimbrough Memorial Stadium

2013 Lone Star Conference football standings
	Conf.			Overall
Team	W		L	W		L
Eastern New Mexico +	5	–	1	7	–	3
Tarleton State +	5	–	1	7	–	3
No. 11 West Texas A&M ^	4	–	2	11	–	3
Midwestern State	3	–	3	7	–	3
Texas A&M–Commerce #	2	–	4	7	–	5
Angelo State	2	–	4	5	–	6
Texas A&M–Kingsville	0	–	6	2	–	8
+ – Conference co-champions; ^ – NCAA Division II playoff participant; # – Live United Texarkana Bowl participant; Rankings from AFCA poll

The 2013 West Texas A&M Buffaloes football team represented West Texas A&M University in the 2013 NCAA Division II football season as a member of the Lone Star Conference (LSC). The Buffaloes were led by first-year head coach Mike Nesbitt. The team played its home games at Kimbrough Memorial Stadium in Canyon, Texas. The Buffaloes finished the season with an overall record of 11–3 with a LSC record of 4–2, finishing third in the conference.

The team received a bid to the NCAA Division II Playoffs as the sixth seed in Super Region 4, losing to Grand Valley State 28–35 in the quarterfinals; to date, this is the last season the Buffaloes have made the Division II playoffs. For the 2013 season, Nesbitt served under the interim tag before being named the Buffaloes' full-time head coach following the season.

Senior quarterback Dustin Vaughan broke the program record for passing yards and passing touchdowns. Vaughan was one of three finalists for the Harlon Hill Trophy. Vaughn would ultimately finish second in voting.

== Offseason ==
=== Coaching changes ===
On August 22, just weeks before the team's opening game, the university announced that head coach Don Carthel had been fired. According to the press release, Carthel was dismissed for misleading university officials about buying tickets for two players on the football team and instructed the players to lie about where the tickets came from.

Mike Nesbitt, who had been originally hired as assistant head coach and offensive line coach, was named the Buffaloes' interim head coach. Nesbitt had previously served as the Buffaloes' quarterbacks coach and offensive coordinator.

== Preseason ==
=== LSC media poll ===
The LSC media poll was released on July 29, 2013. The Buffaloes were predicted to finish first in the conference.

== Schedule ==
Date	Time	Opponent	Rank	Site	Result	Attendance
September 7	2:00 p.m.	at Western State (CO)*	No. 3	Mountaineer Bowl; Gunnison, CO	W 48–21	752
September 12	7:00 p.m.	vs. No. 18 Chadron State*	No. 4	AT&T Stadium; Arlington, TX (LSC Football Festival)	W 34–31	3,093
September 21	6:00 p.m.	Texas A&M–Commerce	No. 4	Kimbrough Memorial Stadium; Canyon, TX (East Texas vs. West Texas)	W 62–28	11,126
September 28	7:00 p.m.	at Texas A&M–Kingsville	No. 4	Javelina Stadium; Kingsville, TX	W 69–7	11,500
October 5	3:00 p.m.	Central State (OH)*^{†}	No. 4	Kimbrough Memorial Stadium; Canyon, TX	W 72–0	13,876
October 12	7:00 p.m.	at No. 21 Tarleton State	No. 4	Memorial Stadium; Stephenville, TX	L 27–31	8,147
October 19	6:00 p.m.	Angelo State	No. 17	Kimbrough Memorial Stadium; Canyon, TX	W 34–30	5,487
October 26	2:00 p.m.	at McMurry*	No. 16	Wilford Moore Stadium; Abilene, TX	W 90–57	2,134
November 2	6:00 p.m.	Eastern New Mexico	No. 15	Kimbrough Memorial Stadium; Canyon, TX (Wagon Wheel)	L 38–39	7,167
November 9	6:00 p.m.	West Georgia*		Kimbrough Memorial Stadium; Canyon, TX	W 63–23	6,178
November 16	1:00 p.m.	at Midwestern State	No. 25	Memorial Stadium; Wichita Falls, TX	W 19–12	8,123
November 23	11:00 a.m.	at No. 10 Indianapolis*	No. 19	Key Stadium; Indianapolis, IN (NCAA Division II First Round)	W 27–14	3,106
November 30	12:00 p.m.	at No. 7 Ohio Dominican*	No. 19	Panther Stadium; Columbus, OH (NCAA Division II Second Round)	W 34–27	783
December 7	12:00 p.m.	at No. 22 Grand Valley State	No. 19	Lubbers Stadium; Allendale, MI (NCAA Division II Quarterfinal)	L 28–35	4,296
*Non-conference game; ^{†}Homecoming; Rankings from AFCA Poll released prior to the game; All times are in Central time

== Rankings ==
Ranking movements Legend: ██ Increase in ranking ██ Decrease in ranking RV = Received votes ( ) = First-place votes
	Week												
Poll	Pre	1	2	3	4	5	6	7	8	9	10	11	Final
AFCA	3 (1)	4	4	4	4	4 (1)	17	16	15	RV	25	19	11

== Game summaries ==
=== At Western State (CO) ===
	1	2	3	4	Total
No. 3 Buffaloes	17	17	7	7	48
Mountaineers	0	0	0	21	21

Statistics	WTAMU	WSCU
First downs	30	14
Total yards	562	267
Rushing yards	88	18
Passing yards	474	249
Turnovers	0	3
Time of possession	31:39	28:21

Team	Category	Player	Statistics
West Texas A&M	Passing	Dustin Vaughan	37/57, 470 yards, 6 TD
West Texas A&M	Rushing	Geremy Alridge	11 rushes, 50 yards
West Texas A&M	Receiving	Torrence Allen	12 receptions, 206 yards, 2 TD
Western State	Passing	Brett Arrivey	22/33, 177 yards, 2 TD
Western State	Rushing	Arius Norris	4 rushes, 13 yards
Western State	Receiving	Travis Haney	7 receptions, 113 yards, TD

=== Vs. No. 18 Chadron State (LSC Football Festival) ===
	1	2	3	4	Total
No. 18 Eagles	21	3	7	0	31
No. 4 Buffaloes	3	3	10	18	34

Statistics	CSC	WTAMU
First downs	25	23
Total yards	464	462
Rushing yards	242	109
Passing yards	222	353
Turnovers	3	2
Time of possession	33:49	26:11

Team	Category	Player	Statistics
Chadron State	Passing	John McLain	28/40, 222 yards, TD, 3 INT
Chadron State	Rushing	Glen Clinton	24 rushes, 143 yards, TD
Chadron State	Receiving	Chapman Ham	8 receptions, 61 yards
West Texas A&M	Passing	Dustin Vaughan	29/41, 353 yards, TD
West Texas A&M	Rushing	Aaron Harris	17 rushes, 103 yards, 2 TD
West Texas A&M	Receiving	Torrence Allen	8 receptions, 124 yards

=== Texas A&M–Commerce ===
	1	2	3	4	Total
Lions	14	0	7	7	28
No. 4 Buffaloes	21	3	14	24	62

Statistics	TAMUC	WTAMU
First downs	23	31
Total yards	331	590
Rushing yards	64	82
Passing yards	267	508
Turnovers	2	1
Time of possession	26:09	33:51

Team	Category	Player	Statistics
Texas A&M–Commerce	Passing	Tyrik Rollison	15/29, 258 yards, 3 TD, INT
Texas A&M–Commerce	Rushing	Aaron Fields	4 rushes, 31 yards
Texas A&M–Commerce	Receiving	Vernon Johnson	3 receptions, 137 yards, 2 TD
West Texas A&M	Passing	Dustin Vaughan	36/62, 508 yards, 4 TD
West Texas A&M	Rushing	Geremy Alridge	4 rushes, 44 yards, TD
West Texas A&M	Receiving	Anthony Johnson	9 receptions, 181 yards, TD

=== At Texas A&M–Kingsville ===
	1	2	3	4	Total
No. 4 Buffaloes	7	24	35	3	69
Javelinas	0	7	0	0	7

Statistics	WTAMU	TAMUK
First downs	25	14
Total yards	419	188
Rushing yards	118	96
Passing yards	301	92
Turnovers	0	2
Time of possession	26:51	33:09

Team	Category	Player	Statistics
West Texas A&M	Passing	Dustin Vaughan	25/33, 227 yards, TD
West Texas A&M	Rushing	Jamison Sterns	6 rushes, 44 yards
West Texas A&M	Receiving	Jace Jackson	6 receptions, 72 yards
Texas A&M–Kingsville	Passing	Aaron Bueno	13/23, 92 yards, TD
Texas A&M–Kingsville	Rushing	Cornelius Shackelford	14 rushes, 47 yards
Texas A&M–Kingsville	Receiving	C. J. Griggs	2 receptions, 24 yards

=== Central State ===
	1	2	3	4	Total
Marauders	0	0	0	0	0
No. 4 Buffaloes	20	24	7	21	72

Statistics	CSU	WTAMU
First downs	17	32
Total yards	305	663
Rushing yards	126	169
Passing yards	179	494
Turnovers	3	0
Time of possession	36:08	23:52

Team	Category	Player	Statistics
Central State	Passing	Michael Wilson	16/32, 124 yards, INT
Central State	Rushing	Michael Wilson	15 rushes, 52 yards
Central State	Receiving	Zach Thomas	6 receptions, 59 yards
West Texas A&M	Passing	Dustin Vaughan	33/41, 438 yards, 7 TD
West Texas A&M	Rushing	Aaron Harris	6 rushes, 82 yards, TD
West Texas A&M	Receiving	Anthony Johnson	8 receptions, 114 yards, TD

=== At No. 21 Tarleton State ===
	1	2	3	4	Total
No. 4 Buffaloes	13	14	0	0	27
No. 21 Texans	3	0	7	21	31

Statistics	WTAMU	TSU
First downs	22	30
Total yards	360	560
Rushing yards	105	133
Passing yards	255	427
Turnovers	1	3
Time of possession	32:05	27:55

Team	Category	Player	Statistics
West Texas A&M	Passing	Dustin Vaughan	25/43, 255 yards, 2 TD, INT
West Texas A&M	Rushing	Aaron Harris	17 rushes, 66 yards, TD
West Texas A&M	Receiving	Torrence Allen	5 receptions, 74 yards
Tarleton State	Passing	Jake Fenske	25/42, 388 yards, 3 TD
Tarleton State	Rushing	Zach Henshaw	22 rushes, 107 yards
Tarleton State	Receiving	Le'Nard Meyers	8 receptions, 168 yards, 2 TD

=== Angelo State ===
	1	2	3	4	Total
Rams	7	16	7	0	30
No. 17 Buffaloes	7	12	0	15	34

Statistics	ASU	WTAMU
First downs	27	25
Total yards	554	519
Rushing yards	256	48
Passing yards	298	471
Turnovers	2	2
Time of possession	35:41	24:19

Team	Category	Player	Statistics
Angelo State	Passing	Kyle Washington	22/36, 298 yards, TD
Angelo State	Rushing	Kyle Washington	11 rushes, 106 yards, TD
Angelo State	Receiving	Joey Knight	9 receptions, 106 yards, TD
West Texas A&M	Passing	Dustin Vaughan	32/58, 471 yards, 4 TD, INT
West Texas A&M	Rushing	Geremy Alridge	10 rushes, 39 yards
West Texas A&M	Receiving	Torrence Allen	12 receptions, 199 yards, 2 TD

=== At McMurry ===
	1	2	3	4	Total
No. 16 Buffaloes	24	28	31	7	90
War Hawks	14	14	21	8	57

Statistics	WTAMU	MCM
First downs	28	40
Total yards	693	708
Rushing yards	241	300
Passing yards	452	408
Turnovers	1	3
Time of possession	27:29	32:31

Team	Category	Player	Statistics
West Texas A&M	Passing	Dustin Vaughan	27/40, 452 yards, 6 TD, INT
West Texas A&M	Rushing	Aaron Harris	11 rushes, 136 yards, TD
West Texas A&M	Receiving	Anthony Johnson	5 receptions, 97 yards, TD
McMurry	Passing	Gabe Rodriguez	28/46, 344 yards, 5 TD, 2 INT
McMurry	Rushing	Paxton Grayer	12 rushes, 159 yards, 2 TD
McMurry	Receiving	Greg Livingston	8 receptions, 129 yards, 2 TD

=== Eastern New Mexico ===
	1	2	3	4	Total
Greyhounds	0	17	7	15	39
No. 15 Buffaloes	14	17	7	0	38

Statistics	ENMU	WTAMU
First downs	24	23
Total yards	380	484
Rushing yards	232	12
Passing yards	148	472
Turnovers	1	1
Time of possession	33:02	26:58

Team	Category	Player	Statistics
Eastern New Mexico	Passing	Jeremy Buurma	8/16, 148 yards, TD
Eastern New Mexico	Rushing	Christian Long	27 rushes, 121 yards, 3 TD
Eastern New Mexico	Receiving	Ricky Milks	2 receptions, 49 yards
West Texas A&M	Passing	Dustin Vaughan	38/57, 472 yards, 5 TD, INT
West Texas A&M	Rushing	Geremy Alridge	2 rushes, 19 yards
West Texas A&M	Receiving	Torrence Allen	11 receptions, 158 yards, 2 TD

=== West Georgia ===
	1	2	3	4	Total
Wolves	0	7	7	9	23
Buffaloes	7	28	14	14	63

Statistics	UWG	WTAMU
First downs	25	25
Total yards	435	546
Rushing yards	290	167
Passing yards	145	379
Turnovers	3	0
Time of possession	35:11	24:07

Team	Category	Player	Statistics
West Georgia	Passing	Austin Trainor	4/9, 83 yards
West Georgia	Rushing	Quan Jones	19 rushes, 97 yards, 2 TD
West Georgia	Receiving	Malcolm Johnson	1 reception, 56 yards
West Texas A&M	Passing	Dustin Vaughan	29/41, 370 yards, 6 TD
West Texas A&M	Rushing	Aaron Harris	16 rushes, 145 yards, 2 TD
West Texas A&M	Receiving	Torrence Allen	5 receptions, 97 yards, TD

=== At Midwestern State ===
	1	2	3	4	Total
No. 25 Buffaloes	3	6	0	10	19
Mustangs	3	0	3	6	12

Statistics	WTAMU	MSU
First downs	22	14
Total yards	315	284
Rushing yards	65	123
Passing yards	250	161
Turnovers	2	2
Time of possession	30:57	29:03

Team	Category	Player	Statistics
West Texas A&M	Passing	Dustin Vaughan	23/46, 250 yards, 2 INT
West Texas A&M	Rushing	Aaron Harris	13 rushes, 38 yards
West Texas A&M	Receiving	Torrence Allen	7 receptions, 94 yards
Midwestern State	Passing	Jake Glover	10/18, 116 yards, INT
Midwestern State	Rushing	Keidrick Jackson	25 rushes, 132 yards, TD
Midwestern State	Receiving	Mark Strange	7 receptions, 117 yards

=== At No. 10 Indianapolis (NCAA Division II First Round) ===
	1	2	3	4	Total
No. 19 Buffaloes	7	10	10	0	27
No. 10 Greyhounds	7	0	7	0	14

Statistics	WTAMU	INDY
First downs	28	17
Total yards	435	312
Rushing yards	115	122
Passing yards	320	190
Turnovers	0	1
Time of possession	34:15	25:45

Team	Category	Player	Statistics
West Texas A&M	Passing	Dustin Vaughan	37/47, 320 yards, 3 TD
West Texas A&M	Rushing	Aaron Harris	13 rushes, 59 yards
West Texas A&M	Receiving	Torrence Allen	15 receptions, 146 yards, TD
Indianapolis	Passing	Connor Barthel	19/37, 190 yards, 2 TD, INT
Indianapolis	Rushing	Klay Fiechter	16 rushes, 67 yards
Indianapolis	Receiving	Greg Johnson	5 receptions, 64 yards

=== At No. 7 Ohio Dominican (NCAA Division II Second Round) ===
	1	2	3	4	Total
No. 19 Buffaloes	0	7	6	21	34
No. 7 Panthers	7	0	6	14	27

Statistics	WTAMU	ODU
First downs	30	24
Total yards	530	392
Rushing yards	114	143
Passing yards	416	249
Turnovers	1	2
Time of possession	37:12	22:48

Team	Category	Player	Statistics
West Texas A&M	Passing	Dustin Vaughan	39/52, 416 yards, 4 TD, INT
West Texas A&M	Rushing	Geremy Alridge	18 rushes, 76 yards
West Texas A&M	Receiving	Torrence Allen	11 receptions, 145 yards, TD
Ohio Dominican	Passing	Mark Miller	20/33, 249 yards, 3 TD, INT
Ohio Dominican	Rushing	Brandon Schoen	14 rushes, 65 yards
Ohio Dominican	Receiving	Nate Weeks	6 receptions, 103 yards

=== At No. 4 Grand Valley State (NCAA Division II Quarterfinal) ===
	1	2	3	4	Total
No. 19 Buffaloes	14	14	0	0	28
No. 4 Lakers	7	7	21	0	35

Statistics	WTAMU	GV
First downs	23	22
Total yards	434	295
Rushing yards	37	76
Passing yards	397	219
Turnovers	3	2
Time of possession	33:03	26:57

Team	Category	Player	Statistics
West Texas A&M	Passing	Dustin Vaughan	36/56, 397 yards, 4 TD, 3 INT
West Texas A&M	Rushing	Aaron Harris	16 rushes, 46 yards
West Texas A&M	Receiving	Anthony Johnson	11 receptions, 165 yards, 2 TD
Grand Valley State	Passing	Heath Parling	16/32, 219 yards, 4 TD, INT
Grand Valley State	Rushing	Chris Robinson	16 rushes, 48 yards
Grand Valley State	Receiving	Kirk Spencer	4 receptions, 77 yards, TD

== Personnel ==
2013 West Texas A&M Buffaloes football team roster
Players
Coaches
Offense

Pos.	#	Name	Class
WR	1	Anthony Johnson	Jr
WR	3	Jeremy Watson	Jr
RB	4	Geremy Alridge-Mitchell	So
RB	5	Aaron Harris	Sr
WR	6	Jarrian Rhone	So
WR	8	Nathan Slaughter	Sr
QB	10	Dustin Vaughan	Sr
WR	11	Torrence Allen	Sr
QB	12	David Lehocky	Jr
WR	14	Jace Jackson	Sr
WR	15	Word Hudson	So
QB	16	Jared Cate	Fr
QB	17	Preston Rabb	So
RB	28	Jamison Sterns	Jr
RB	30	Marcell Porter	Fr
RB	45	Deshaun Rawls	Jr
OL	55	Austin Carson	Fr
OL	59	Jared Wesley	Fr
OL	60	Toriese Thomas	Fr
OL	62	Garrett Neuman	Fr
OL	63	Nick Phillips	Fr
OL	64	Craig Watts	Sr
OL	65	Joshua Keith	Fr
OL	66	Aaron Ploeger	Fr
OL	67	Marcus Clements	Jr
OL	68	Terry Banks	Jr
OL	70	Jamil Williams	Jr
OL	71	Terrance Harris	Sr
OL	72	Dillon Vaughan	Fr
OL	73	Marc Waller	Sr
OL	74	Emory Atterberry	Jr
OL	75	Larson Crume	So
OL	76	Stephan Dube	Sr
OL	77	Arthur Fatu	Jr
OL	78	Patrick Ward	Sr
OL	79	Justin Griego	Fr
WR	80	Dimitri Donald	So
WR	81	Sidney Parker	Sr
WR	82	Trevor Hammargren	Sr
WR	84	Jacob Hancock	Jr
WR	85	Dominique Messer	Fr
WR	87	Akeem Harrison	Fr
TE	88	Preston Armstrong	Fr
WR	89	Jordan Jones	Fr
QB		Ethan Brinkley	Fr
RB		Isiah Cowan	Fr
TE		Jerrod Dubois	Fr
WR		Johnny Gaines	Jr
WR		Freddy Gibbs	Fr
WR		Joshua Kenebrew	Fr
WR		Lorenzo Mervin	Jr
WR		Raymond Racine	Fr
QB		Seth Reagan	Fr
WR		Dontha Robinson	Fr
RB		C. J. Washington	Fr
OL		Tyler Wise	Fr
TE		Jonathan Witt	Jr
RB		Joshua Woods	Fr

Defense

Pos.	#	Name	Class
DB	2	Stormy Butler	Jr
DB	7	Anthony Hayes	So
DB	9	Dwight Morrison	Sr
LB	18	Bryan Johnson	Sr
DB	19	John McSheffery	Sr
DB	20	Chris Ceazer	So
DB	21	Torian Oakley	Jr
DB	22	Curtis Slater	Sr
DB	23	Kendrele Staten	So
DB	24	Will Toliver	Fr
LB	25	LeBrandon Mosley	Sr
DB	26	Brandon Green	Jr
DB	29	Colton McDonald	Fr
LB	32	Taylor McCuller	Sr
DL	33	David Christmas	Sr
LB	34	Cameron Warren	Jr
DB	35	Myles Wheeler	Fr
LB	36	Christian McBride	So
DB	38	Ethan Morriss	So
LB	40	Chris Olson	Sr
LB	42	Jonathan Atchison	Sr
LB	44	Sergey Sadovoy	So
LB	45	Patrick Youngman	Fr
LB	46	Kyle Voss	Sr
LB	47	Jared Francis	Jr
LB	50	Alex Olson	Fr
LB	51	Nick Whitt	Sr
LB	53	Connor Allen	Fr
LB	54	Kyler Gregory	Jr
LB	56	Carter James	Fr
DL	57	Kennedy Nwanne	Fr
DL	61	Derriel Collins	Fr
DL	69	Alex Tucci	So
DL	90	Ethan Westbrooks	Sr
DL	91	John Sheehy	Jr
DL	92	Meili Valele	Jr
DL	93	Lapear Willrich	Fr
DL	95	Shane Pennix	Sr
DL	96	Kedrick Dial	Jr
DL	97	Kevon Hunter	Fr
DL	98	Roland Gonzalez	Fr
DL	99	Jacob Laguna	So
DB		T. J. Broden	Fr
DL		Tanner Graham	Fr
DL		Conner Jetton	Fr
DB		Tarin Lee	Sr
LB		Steven Miller	Fr
LB		Gavin Nesbitt	Fr
DB		Hunter Streuling	Fr
LB		Tanner Vestal	Fr
LB		Anthony Walker	Fr

Special teams

Pos.	#	Name	Class
P, K	13	Kevin Vanvoris	Sr
K	41	Sergio Castillo	Sr
DS	48	Ramon Lopez	Sr
DS	58	Josh Beal	So
DS	83	Conner Hollabaugh	Fr
K		Jose Arzate	Fr

Head coach

- Mike Nesbitt

Coordinators/assistant coaches

- Stephen Lee
  Offensive coordinator/Quarterbacks
- Nick Paremski
  Defensive coordinator
- Brett Watson
  Defensive line
- Rashad Sanders
  Outside linebackers
- John Kenjura
  Defensive backs

Legend

- (C) Team captain
- (S) Suspended
- (I) Ineligible
- Injured
- Redshirt

Roster
Last update: August 30, 2024
