= 2013 Tarleton State Texans football team =

American college football season

2013 Tarleton State Texans football

LSC co-champion

C.H.A.M.P.S. Heart of Texas Bowl (cancelled), vs. Ouachita Baptist
- Conference: Lone Star Conference
- Record: 7–3 (5–1 LSC)
- Head coach: Cary Fowler (4th season)
- Offensive coordinator: Justin Carrigan (2nd season)
- Offensive scheme: Spread
- Defensive coordinator: Henry Cofer (8th season)
- Base defense: 3–4
- Home stadium: Memorial Stadium

2013 Lone Star Conference football standings
	Conf.			Overall
Team	W		L	W		L
Eastern New Mexico +	5	–	1	7	–	3
Tarleton State +	5	–	1	7	–	3
No. 11 West Texas A&M ^	4	–	2	11	–	3
Midwestern State	3	–	3	7	–	3
Texas A&M–Commerce #	2	–	4	7	–	5
Angelo State	2	–	4	5	–	6
Texas A&M–Kingsville	0	–	6	2	–	8
+ – Conference co-champions; ^ – NCAA Division II playoff participant; # – Live United Texarkana Bowl participant; Rankings from AFCA poll

The 2013 Tarleton State Texans football team represented Tarleton State University during the 2013 NCAA Division II football season as a member of the Lone Star Conference (LSC). Led by fourth-year head coach Cary Fowler, the Texans played their home games at Memorial Stadium in Stephenville, Texas.

The Texans finished the regular season with an overall record of 7–3 with a conference record of 5–1, finishing tied for first place in the LSC. The Texans were selected for the C.H.A.M.P.S. Heart of Texas Bowl and were scheduled to play against Ouachita Baptist; the game was cancelled on December 5 due to winter weather and icy conditions throughout the North Texas and Southwest Arkansas regions.

== LSC media poll ==
The LSC media poll was released on July 29, 2013. The Texans were predicted to finish third in the conference.

== Schedule ==
Date	Time	Opponent	Rank	Site	Result	Attendance
September 14	4:00 p.m.	vs. No. 13 Midwestern State		AT&T Stadium; Arlington, TX (LSC Football Festival)	W 27–24	16,947
September 21	7:00 p.m.	at Angelo State		San Angelo Stadium; San Angelo, TX	W 38–34	6,540
September 28	4:00 p.m.	vs. Abilene Christian*	No. 25	Toyota Stadium; Frisco, TX	W 41–34 ^{2OT}	5,500
October 5	3:00 p.m.	at Eastern New Mexico	No. 22	Greyhound Stadium; Portales, NM	W 34–14	2,312
October 12	7:00 p.m.	No. 4 West Texas A&M	No. 21	Memorial Stadium; Stephenville, TX	W 31–27	8,147
October 19	6:00 p.m.	at Delta State	No. 14	McCool Stadium; Cleveland, MS	L 36–38	3,123
October 26	6:00 p.m.	Texas–A&M Commerce^{†}	No. 23	Memorial Stadium; Stephenville, TX	L 20–22	6,137
November 2	7:00 p.m.	at Texas A&M–Kingsville		Javelina Stadium; Kingsville, TX	W 45–20	8,069
November 9	2:00 p.m.	SW Oklahoma State*		Memorial Stadium; Stephenville, TX	W 49–32	4,379
November 16	2:00 p.m.	No. 20 North Alabama*		Memorial Stadium; Stephenville, TX	L 7–44	2,139
December 7	6:30 p.m.	vs. Ouachita Baptist*		Bulldawg Stadium; Copperas Cove, TX (C.H.A.M.P.S. Heart of Texas Bowl)	Cancelled	
*Non-conference game; ^{†}Homecoming; Rankings from AFCA Poll released prior to the game; All times are in Central time

== Rankings ==
Ranking movements Legend: ██ Increase in ranking ██ Decrease in ranking — = Not ranked RV = Received votes
	Week												
Poll	Pre	1	2	3	4	5	6	7	8	9	10	11	Final
AFCA	—	—	RV	25	22	21	14	23	RV	RV	RV	—	—

== Game summaries ==
=== Vs. No. 13 Midwestern State (LSC Football Festival) ===
	1	2	3	4	Total
Texans	0	7	14	6	27
No. 13 Mustangs	7	3	0	14	24

Statistics	TSU	MSU
First downs	26	18
Total yards	380	338
Rushing yards	198	79
Passing yards	182	259
Turnovers	2	1
Time of possession	33:30	26:30

Team	Category	Player	Statistics
Tarleton State	Passing	Jake Fenske	11/12, 107 yards, 2 TD, INT
Tarleton State	Rushing	Zach Henshaw	19 rushes, 87 yards
Tarleton State	Receiving	Clifton Rhodes III	8 receptions, 50 yards
Midwestern State	Passing	Jake Glover	11/18, 174 yards, 2 TD
Midwestern State	Rushing	Keidrick Jackson	17 rushes, 46 yards
Midwestern State	Receiving	Joe Sanders	8 receptions, 102 yards, TD

=== At Angelo State ===
	1	2	3	4	Total
Texans	7	14	0	17	38
Rams	7	7	6	14	34

Statistics	TSU	ASU
First downs	22	23
Total yards	472	538
Rushing yards	134	252
Passing yards	338	286
Turnovers	1	2
Time of possession	27:14	32:46

Team	Category	Player	Statistics
Tarleton State	Passing	Aaron Doyle	10/21, 171 yards, 2 TD
Tarleton State	Rushing	Aaron Doyle	13 rushes, 69 yards, TD
Tarleton State	Receiving	Clifton Rhodes III	5 receptions, 103 yards, 3 TD
Angelo State	Passing	Kyle Washington	20/31, 286 yards, 2 TD, 2 INT
Angelo State	Rushing	Blake Smith	15 rushes, 104 yards, TD
Angelo State	Receiving	Quinn Reels	6 receptions, 106 yards, TD

=== Vs. Abilene Christian ===
	1	2	3	4	OT	2OT	Total
No. 25 Texans	14	7	7	3	3	7	41
Wildcats	0	10	7	14	3	0	34

Statistics	TSU	ACU
First downs	26	22
Total yards	484	361
Rushing yards	287	131
Passing yards	197	230
Turnovers	4	1
Time of possession	24:27	35:33

Team	Category	Player	Statistics
Tarleton State	Passing	Jake Fenske	17/33, 162 yards, 2 TD, INT
Tarleton State	Rushing	Jerome Regal	31 rushes, 251 yards, 2 TD
Tarleton State	Receiving	Le'Nard Meyers	9 receptions, 85 yards
Abilene Christian	Passing	John David Baker	26/46, 230 yards, TD, INT
Abilene Christian	Rushing	John David Baker	18 rushes, 77 yards, TD
Abilene Christian	Receiving	Taylor Gabriel	8 receptions, 78 yards

=== At Eastern New Mexico ===
	1	2	3	4	Total
No. 22 Texans	7	17	3	7	34
Greyhounds	7	0	0	7	14

Statistics	TSU	ENMU
First downs	24	22
Total yards	398	401
Rushing yards	85	204
Passing yards	313	197
Turnovers	3	4
Time of possession	25:40	34:20

Team	Category	Player	Statistics
Tarleton State	Passing	Jake Fenske	27/50, 313 yards, 3 TD, 2 INT
Tarleton State	Rushing	Jerome Ragel	14 rushes, 55 yards
Tarleton State	Receiving	Andre Plata	6 receptions, 70 yards
Eastern New Mexico	Passing	Jeremy Buurma	9/22, 185 yards, TD
Eastern New Mexico	Rushing	Vaughn Johnson	13 rushes, 51 yards
Eastern New Mexico	Receiving	Jacob Johnson	6 receptions, 92 yards

=== No. 4 West Texas A&M ===
	1	2	3	4	Total
No. 4 Buffaloes	13	14	0	0	27
No. 21 Texans	3	0	7	21	31

Statistics	WTAMU	TSU
First downs	22	30
Total yards	360	560
Rushing yards	105	133
Passing yards	255	427
Turnovers	1	3
Time of possession	32:05	27:55

Team	Category	Player	Statistics
West Texas A&M	Passing	Dustin Vaughan	25/43, 255 yards, 2 TD, INT
West Texas A&M	Rushing	Aaron Harris	17 rushes, 66 yards, TD
West Texas A&M	Receiving	Torrence Allen	5 receptions, 74 yards
Tarleton State	Passing	Jake Fenske	25/42, 388 yards, 3 TD
Tarleton State	Rushing	Zach Henshaw	22 rushes, 107 yards
Tarleton State	Receiving	Le'Nard Meyers	8 receptions, 168 yards, 2 TD

=== At Delta State ===
	1	2	3	4	Total
No. 14 Texans	3	21	0	12	36
Statesmen	7	7	14	10	38

Statistics	TSU	DSU
First downs	28	24
Total yards	430	489
Rushing yards	92	67
Passing yards	338	422
Turnovers	3	2
Time of possession	37:33	22:27

Team	Category	Player	Statistics
Tarleton State	Passing	Jake Fenske	34/48, 240 yards, TD, INT
Tarleton State	Rushing	Zach Henshaw	16 rushes, 59 yards
Tarleton State	Receiving	Clifton Rhodes III	10 receptions, 74 yards
Delta State	Passing	Tyler Sullivan	33/49, 422 yards, 4 TD
Delta State	Rushing	Tyler Sullivan	9 rushes, 43 yards
Delta State	Receiving	Patrick Bethley	4 receptions, 97 yards, TD

=== Texas A&M–Commerce ===
	1	2	3	4	Total
Lions	0	14	0	8	22
No. 23 Texans	7	10	3	0	20

Statistics	TAMUC	TSU
First downs	20	25
Total yards	409	491
Rushing yards	103	107
Passing yards	306	384
Turnovers	1	0
Time of possession	28:25	31:35

Team	Category	Player	Statistics
Texas A&M–Commerce	Passing	Harrison Stewart	24/35, 279 yards, 2 TD, INT
Texas A&M–Commerce	Rushing	Ki-Janavan Garrett	18 rushes, 97 yards
Texas A&M–Commerce	Receiving	Vernon Johnson	7 receptions, 154 yards, 2 TD
Tarleton State	Passing	Jake Fenske	20/33, 274 yards
Tarleton State	Rushing	Zach Henshaw	16 rushes, 58 yards, TD
Tarleton State	Receiving	Zach Henshaw	7 receptions, 137 yards

=== At Texas A&M–Kingsville ===
	1	2	3	4	Total
Texans	14	14	3	14	45
Javelinas	10	3	0	7	20

Statistics	TSU	TAMUK
First downs	29	32
Total yards	579	473
Rushing yards	205	166
Passing yards	374	307
Turnovers	2	2
Time of possession	26:37	33:23

Team	Category	Player	Statistics
Tarleton State	Passing	Jake Fenske	22/34, 313 yards, 2 TD, 2 INT
Tarleton State	Rushing	Zach Henshaw	12 rushes, 94 yards
Tarleton State	Receiving	Le'Nard Meyers	5 receptions, 102 yards, TD
Texas A&M–Kingsville	Passing	Ronnie Ford	25/40, 307 yards, TD, INT
Texas A&M–Kingsville	Rushing	Anthony Washington	9 rushes, 80 yards
Texas A&M–Kingsville	Receiving	Robert Armstrong	7 receptions, 89 yards

=== SW Oklahoma State ===
	1	2	3	4	Total
Bulldogs	7	12	7	6	32
Texans	14	7	14	14	49

Statistics	SWOSU	TSU
First downs	30	27
Total yards	549	618
Rushing yards	106	157
Passing yards	443	461
Turnovers	1	3
Time of possession	34:31	25:29

Team	Category	Player	Statistics
SW Oklahoma State	Passing	Dustin Stenta	39/63, 443 yards, 2 TD, INT
SW Oklahoma State	Rushing	Karl Hodge	21 rushes, 77 yards, TD
SW Oklahoma State	Receiving	Ryan Corbin	11 receptions, 109 yards
Tarleton State	Passing	Jake Fenske	31/45, 431 yards, 5 TD, INT
Tarleton State	Rushing	Jerome Regal	8 rushes, 81 yards, TD
Tarleton State	Receiving	Bubba Tandy	6 receptions, 129 yards, 2 TD

=== No. 20 North Alabama ===
	1	2	3	4	Total
No. 20 Lions	7	3	14	20	44
Texans	0	0	7	0	7

Statistics	UNA	TSU
First downs	20	12
Total yards	501	290
Rushing yards	293	149
Passing yards	208	141
Turnovers	1	2
Time of possession	36:59	23:01

Team	Category	Player	Statistics
North Alabama	Passing	Luke Wingo	9/14, 174 yards, 2 TD, INT
North Alabama	Rushing	Lamonte Thompson	17 rushes, 113 yards
North Alabama	Receiving	Lee Mayhall	5 receptions, 147 yards, 2 TD
Tarleton State	Passing	Collin Strahan	8/15, 135 yards, TD, INT
Tarleton State	Rushing	Jerome Regal	10 rushes, 59 yards
Tarleton State	Receiving	Clifton Rhodes III	2 receptions, 58 yards
