= 2013 McMurry War Hawks football team =

American college football season

2013 McMurry War Hawks football
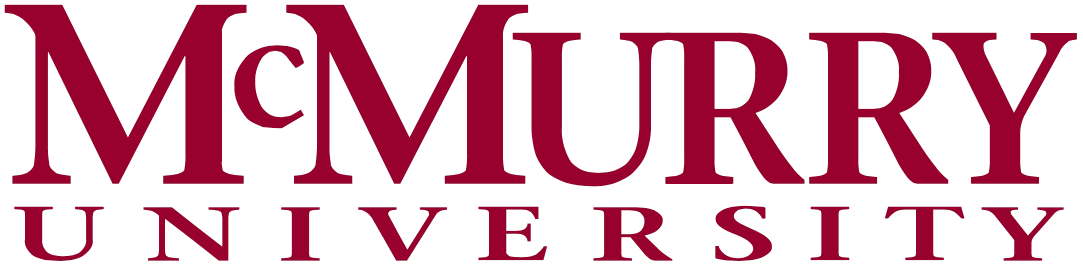
- Conference: Independent
- Record: 3–8
- Head coach: Mason Miller (1st season)
- Offensive coordinator: Chase Holbrook (1st season)
- Offensive scheme: Air raid
- Defensive coordinator: Kendall Roberson (1st season)
- Base defense: 3–3–5
- Home stadium: Wilford Moore Stadium

2013 NCAA Division II Super Region 4 independents football records
	Conf.			Overall
Team	W		L	W		L
South Dakota Mines		–		6	–	4
Alderson Broaddus		–		4	–	6
OK Panhandle State		–		4	–	7
McMurry #		–		3	–	8
# – Provisional NCAA Division II member

The 2013 McMurry War Hawks football team represented McMurry University during the 2013 NCAA Division II football season and competed as an independent. The War Hawks competed as a provisional division II team, transitioning from Division III. The War Hawks were led by Mason Miller in his first and only season as head coach.

On January 31, 2014, the university's Board of Trustees voted to withdraw the school's provisional division II status and remain in division III for all of its athletic programs. Following the board's announcement, several coaches stepped down from their positions, including Miller, who announced his resignation on March 29, 2014. Defensive coordinator Kendall Roberson was named interim head coach.

== Offseason ==
=== Coaching changes ===
Head coach Hal Mumme stepped down in January 2013, later taking an offensive assistant position at SMU. On January 30, offensive coordinator Mason Miller was named the program's 21st head coach. Quarterbacks coach Chase Holbrook was promoted to offensive coordinator while defensive backs coach Kendall Roberson was promoted to defensive coordinator.

== Schedule ==
Date	Time	Opponent	Site	Result	Attendance
September 7	6:00 p.m.	at Abilene Christian	Shotwell Stadium; Abilene, TX	L 17–60	7,091
September 14	6:00 p.m.	at Stephen F. Austin	Homer Bryce Stadium; Nacogdoches, TX	L 13–50	8,254
September 21	7:00 p.m.	at Texas A&M–Kingsville	Javelina Stadium; Kingsville, TX	L 32–52	10,500
September 28	6:00 p.m.	Oklahoma Panhandle State	Wilford Moore Stadium; Abilene, TX	W 53–27	1,639
October 5	2:00 p.m.	Angelo State^{†}	Wilford Moore Stadium; Abilene, TX	L 35–48	3,042
October 12	7:00 p.m.	at No. 25 Midwestern State	Memorial Stadium; Wichita Falls, TX	L 20–66	6,121
October 19	6:00 p.m.	at Texas A&M–Commerce	Memorial Stadium; Commerce, TX	L 43–65	4,129
October 26	2:00 p.m.	No. 16 West Texas A&M	Wilford Moore Stadium; Abilene, TX	L 57–90	2,134
November 2	2:00 p.m.	Incarnate Word	Wilford Moore Stadium; Abilene, TX	L 43–47	1,713
November 9	2:00 p.m.	at Wayland Baptist	Bulldog Stadium; Plainview, TX	W 56–29	800
November 16	2:00 p.m.	Southern Nazarene	Wilford Moore Stadium; Abilene, TX	W 55–20	2,038
^{†}Homecoming; Rankings from AFCA Poll released prior to the game; All times are in Central time

== Game summaries ==
=== At Abilene Christian ===
	1	2	3	4	Total
War Hawks	3	0	14	0	17
Wildcats	7	25	21	7	60

Statistics	MCM	ACU
First downs	17	31
Total yards	406	567
Rushing yards	215	333
Passing yards	191	234
Turnovers	2	2
Time of possession	21:29	38:31

Team	Category	Player	Statistics
McMurry	Passing	Brady Lambert	22/35, 187 yards, INT
McMurry	Rushing	Paxton Grayer	13 rushes, 137 yards, TD
McMurry	Receiving	Jeret Smith	7 receptions, 81 yards
Abilene Christian	Passing	John David Baker	17/23, 212 yards, 2 TD
Abilene Christian	Rushing	Charcandrick West	20 rushes, 139 yards, 4 TD
Abilene Christian	Receiving	Charcandrick West	4 receptions, 59 yards

=== At Stephen F. Austin ===
	1	2	3	4	Total
War Hawks	6	7	0	0	13
Lumberjacks	10	24	2	14	50

Statistics	MCM	SFA
First downs	16	39
Total yards	284	635
Rushing yards	69	257
Passing yards	215	378
Turnovers	2	1
Time of possession	24:55	35:05

Team	Category	Player	Statistics
McMurry	Passing	Brady Lambert	27/45, 212 yards, INT
McMurry	Rushing	Chris Simpson	19 rushes, 54 yards, 2 TD
McMurry	Receiving	Jeret Smith	9 receptions, 106 yards
Stephen F. Austin	Passing	Brady Attaway	34/58, 330 yards, 2 TD, INT
Stephen F. Austin	Rushing	Gus Johnson	16 rushes, 107 yards, 2 TD
Stephen F. Austin	Receiving	Tyler Boyd	11 receptions, 112 yards, TD

=== At Texas A&M–Kingsville ===
	1	2	3	4	Total
War Hawks	0	7	12	13	32
Javelinas	28	7	7	10	52

Statistics	MCM	TAMUK
First downs	24	21
Total yards	415	577
Rushing yards	109	529
Passing yards	306	48
Turnovers	2	3
Time of possession	24:51	35:09

Team	Category	Player	Statistics
McMurry	Passing	Gabe Rodriguez	29/52, 278 yards, 4 TD, INT
McMurry	Rushing	Chris Simpson	16 rushes, 53 yards, TD
McMurry	Receiving	Jeret Smith	8 receptions, 94 yards
Texas A&M–Kingsville	Passing	Alex Rios	5/9, 32 yards, 2 INT
Texas A&M–Kingsville	Rushing	Greg Pitre	10 rushes, 180 yards, 2 TD
Texas A&M–Kingsville	Receiving	Robert Armstrong	4 receptions, 18 yards

=== Oklahoma Panhandle State ===
	1	2	3	4	Total
Aggies	6	7	7	7	27
War Hawks	12	20	14	7	53

Statistics	OPSU	MCM
First downs	18	34
Total yards	370	659
Rushing yards	139	234
Passing yards	231	425
Turnovers	1	1
Time of possession	32:25	27:35

Team	Category	Player	Statistics
Oklahoma Panhandle State	Passing	Caleb Holbrook	14/31, 231 yards, INT
Oklahoma Panhandle State	Rushing	Rod Moore	7 rushes, 51 yards
Oklahoma Panhandle State	Receiving	Jamal White	5 receptions, 119 yards
McMurry	Passing	Gabe Rodriguez	26/37, 423 yards, 7 TD, INT
McMurry	Rushing	Chris Simpson	19 rushes, 126 yards
McMurry	Receiving	Jeret Smith	7 receptions, 156 yards, 3 TD

=== Angelo State ===
	1	2	3	4	Total
Rams	7	27	14	0	48
War Hawks	7	0	21	7	35

Statistics	ASU	MCM
First downs	26	24
Total yards	473	468
Rushing yards	307	211
Passing yards	166	257
Turnovers	1	3
Time of possession	37:34	22:26

Team	Category	Player	Statistics
Angelo State	Passing	Kyle Washington	18/26, 159 yards, TD
Angelo State	Rushing	Jermie Calhoun	23 rushes, 152 yards, TD
Angelo State	Receiving	Talon Smith	4 receptions, 47 yards
McMurry	Passing	Gabe Rodriguez	22/46, 257 yards, 4 TD, 2 INT
McMurry	Rushing	Paxton Grayer	10 rushes, 107 yards, TD
McMurry	Receiving	Jeret Smith	5 receptions, 129 yards, TD

=== At No. 25 Midwestern State ===
	1	2	3	4	Total
War Hawks	7	6	7	0	20
No. 25 Mustangs	21	21	21	3	66

Statistics	MCM	MSU
First downs	20	29
Total yards	407	668
Rushing yards	143	476
Passing yards	264	192
Turnovers	4	1
Time of possession	25:04	34:56

Team	Category	Player	Statistics
McMurry	Passing	Gabe Rodriguez	27/47, 248 yards, 3 TD, 2 INT
McMurry	Rushing	Chris Simpson	10 rushes, 45 yards
McMurry	Receiving	Jeret Smith	8 receptions, 120 yards, 3 TD
Midwestern State	Passing	Jake Glover	6/6, 97 yards
Midwestern State	Rushing	Keidrick Jackson	14 rushes, 168 yards, 2 TD
Midwestern State	Receiving	Jerryl Yarbrough	2 receptions, 38 yards

=== At Texas A&M–Commerce ===
	1	2	3	4	Total
War Hawks	21	7	15	0	43
Lions	31	3	3	28	65

Statistics	MCM	TAMUC
First downs	29	27
Total yards	552	510
Rushing yards	140	166
Passing yards	412	344
Turnovers	4	4
Time of possession	29:30	30:30

Team	Category	Player	Statistics
McMurry	Passing	Gabe Rodriguez	38/53, 412 yards, 4 TD, 4 INT
McMurry	Rushing	Paxton Grayer	9 rushes, 81 yards
McMurry	Receiving	Greg Livingston	10 receptions, 193 yards, 2 TD
Texas A&M–Commerce	Passing	Harrison Stewart	24/36, 342 yards, TD, INT
Texas A&M–Commerce	Rushing	Ki-Janaven Garrett	17 rushes, 141 yards
Texas A&M–Commerce	Receiving	Vernon Johnson	5 receptions, 121 yards, TD

=== No. 16 West Texas A&M ===
	1	2	3	4	Total
No. 16 Buffaloes	24	28	31	7	90
War Hawks	14	14	21	8	57

Statistics	WTAMU	MCM
First downs	28	40
Total yards	693	708
Rushing yards	241	300
Passing yards	452	408
Turnovers	1	3
Time of possession	27:29	32:31

Team	Category	Player	Statistics
West Texas A&M	Passing	Dustin Vaughan	27/40, 452 yards, 6 TD, INT
West Texas A&M	Rushing	Aaron Harris	11 rushes, 136 yards, TD
West Texas A&M	Receiving	Anthony Johnson	5 receptions, 97 yards, TD
McMurry	Passing	Gabe Rodriguez	28/46, 344 yards, 5 TD, 2 INT
McMurry	Rushing	Paxton Grayer	12 rushes, 159 yards, 2 TD
McMurry	Receiving	Greg Livingston	8 receptions, 129 yards, 2 TD

=== Incarnate Word ===
	1	2	3	4	Total
Cardinals	13	0	13	21	47
War Hawks	6	14	14	9	43

Statistics	UIW	MCM
First downs	28	22
Total yards	558	593
Rushing yards	396	199
Passing yards	162	394
Turnovers	3	3
Time of possession	34:27	25:33

Team	Category	Player	Statistics
Incarnate Word	Passing	Trent Brittain	15/26, 162 yards, TD, INT
Incarnate Word	Rushing	Broderick Reeves	23 rushes, 244 yards, 6 TD
Incarnate Word	Receiving	Casey Jennings	3 receptions, 45 yards, TD
McMurry	Passing	Gabe Rodriguez	27/50, 394 yards, 4 TD, 2 INT
McMurry	Rushing	Chris Simpson	18 rushes, 136 yards, 2 TD
McMurry	Receiving	Greg Livingston	11 receptions, 232 yards, 2 TD

=== At Wayland Baptist ===
	1	2	3	4	Total
War Hawks	21	21	14	0	56
Pioneers	3	6	0	20	29

Statistics	MCM	WBU
First downs	30	25
Total yards	590	429
Rushing yards	166	250
Passing yards	424	179
Turnovers	3	4
Time of possession	29:18	30:42

Team	Category	Player	Statistics
McMurry	Passing	Gabe Rodriguez	21/33, 372 yards, 6 TD
McMurry	Rushing	Paxton Grayer	14 rushes, 110 yards, TD
McMurry	Receiving	Greg Livingston	5 receptions, 121 yards, 3 TD
Wayland Baptist	Passing	Payson Bain	13/38, 179 yards, TD, INT
Wayland Baptist	Rushing	Payson Bain	24 rushes, 154 yards, TD
Wayland Baptist	Receiving	Chris Acosta	7 receptions, 103 yards

=== Southern Nazarene ===
	1	2	3	4	Total
Crimson Storm	7	6	7	0	20
War Hawks	0	13	21	21	55

Statistics	SNU	MCM
First downs	20	29
Total yards	336	672
Rushing yards	144	170
Passing yards	192	502
Turnovers	1	2
Time of possession	32:42	27:18

Team	Category	Player	Statistics
Southern Nazarene	Passing	Trey Hills	12/21, 142 yards
Southern Nazarene	Rushing	Brian Yenor	23 rushes, 83 yards, 2 TD
Southern Nazarene	Receiving	Alex Reed	2 receptions, 39 yards
McMurry	Passing	Gabe Rodriguez	37/48, 502 yards, 6 TD, INT
McMurry	Rushing	Chris Simpson	11 rushes, 84 yards
McMurry	Receiving	Greg Livingston	13 receptions, 224 yards, 2 TD
