= Mike Nesbitt (American football) =

American football player and coach

Current position
- Title: Special teams assistant
- Team: Arizona
- Conference: Big 12

Biographical details
- Born: Belen, New Mexico, U.S.

Playing career
- 1992–1995: New Mexico
- Position: Punter

Coaching career (HC unless noted)
- 2001–2004: Howard Payne (OC)
- 2005–2006: Blinn (OC)
- 2007–2009: West Texas A&M (WR/QB)
- 2010: West Texas A&M (OC)
- 2011: Stephen F. Austin (OC)
- 2012: Houston (OC)
- 2013–2016: West Texas A&M
- 2017–2024: OUAZ
- 2025: Houston Christian (OC/QB)
- 2026–present: Arizona Wildcats (STA)

Head coaching record
- Overall: 76–32
- Bowls: 0–1
- Tournaments: 2–1 (NCAA D-II playoffs); 0–3 (NAIA playoffs)

Accomplishments and honors

Championships
- 4 SAC (2019, 2021–2023)

Awards
- Second-team All-WAC (1993)

Mike Nesbitt is an American college football coach and former player. He is a special teams assistant coach for the University of Arizona, a position he has held since 2026. He was the head football coach for Ottawa University in Surprise, Arizona, from 2017 to 2024. He served as the head football coach at West Texas A&M University from 2013 to 2016, compiling a record of 25–17. Nesbitt was the offensive coordinator for the Houston Cougars football team at the University of Houston at the start of the 2012 college football season. He previously served as the offensive coordinator at Stephen F. Austin State University, West Texas A&M, Blinn College, and Houston Christian. His 2006 Blinn team won the NJCAA national championship, and his 2010 West Texas A&M team ranked second in the nation with an average of 529 yards per game in total offense.

== Playing career ==
Nesbitt grew up in Belen, New Mexico, and played college football as a punter under head coach Dennis Franchione for the New Mexico Lobos. He averaged 45 yards a punt as a junior, the second highest in New Mexico school history. And as a senior, he "led the nation in net punting."

After his college career, Nesbitt pursued a career in professional football. In June 1994, he signed a contract to play professional football for the New Orleans Saints. He was cut by the Saints in late August 1994. The following year, he was re-signed by the Saints in March 1995. He was again cut by the team in late August before the start of the regular season.

In February 1996, he signed with the Minnesota Vikings. He was released before the start of the regular season.

== Coaching career ==
Nesbitt was as a head football coach at the high school level, including stints at his alma mater, Belen High School, and at Albuquerque, New Mexico's Manzano High School.

In June 2001, Nesbitt left his position at Manzano High School to become the running backs and kicking coach at Howard Payne University in Brownwood, Texas. After four years at Howard Payne Nesbitt accepted a post as the offensive coordinator at Blinn College in Brenham, Texas. At Blinn, he worked under head coach Brad Franchione, the son of Dennis Franchione who had been Nesbitt's college coach. During Nesbitt's two seasons at Blinn, the team compiled a 19–3 record and won the NJCAA national championship.

From 2007 to 2010, he was an assistant coach at West Texas A&M. After three seasons as the quarterbacks coach, he became the offensive coordinator in 2010. During the 2010 season, Nesbitt's offense was ranked as #2 in the nation with an average of 529 yards per game in total offense and #4 in scoring offense with an average of 42 points per game.

In January 2011, Nesbitt became the offensive coordinator at Stephen F. Austin State University in Nacogdoches, Texas. He spent only one year at Stephen H. Austin.

In January 2012, Nesbitt was hired as the offensive coordinator for the Houston Cougars football team under head coach Tony Levine. His work with offense received favorable coverage during the spring and summer months. However, after a 30–13 loss to Texas State in Houston's season opener, Nesbitt resigned his position as offensive coordinator. The Houston Chronicle reported that Nesbitt was "forced to resign . . . in the wake of a stunning season-opening loss to Texas State."

== Head coaching record ==
Year	Team	Overall	Conference	Standing	Bowl/playoffs	AFCA^{#}	NAIA^{°}
West Texas A&M Buffaloes (Lone Star Conference) (2013–2016)
2013	West Texas A&M	11–3	4–2	3rd	L NCAA Division II Quarterfinal	11	
2014	West Texas A&M	2–5 (Note: West Texas A&M vacated four wins, including three conference wins.)	1–3	T–4th			
2015	West Texas A&M	6–4	3–3	T–3rd			
2016	West Texas A&M	6–5	5–4	T–5th			
West Texas A&M:		25–17	13–12				
OUAZ Spirit (Sooner Athletic Conference) (2018–2024)
2018	OUAZ	7–4	5–3	T–3rd	L Victory Bowl		
2019	OUAZ	9–2	7–1	T–1st	L NAIA First Round		16
2020	OUAZ	4–2	4–1	2nd			23
2021	OUAZ	8–2	8–1	1st	L NAIA First Round		14
2022	OUAZ	7–2	7–2	T–1st			19
2023	OUAZ	8–1	7–1	T–1st			13
2024	OUAZ	8–2	7–1	2nd	L NAIA First Round		15
OUAZ:		51–15	45–10				
Total:		76–32					
National championship Conference title Conference division title or championship game berth
