= 2013 Texas A&M–Commerce Lions football team =

American college football season

2013 Texas A&M–Commerce Lions football

Live United Texarkana Bowl, L 3–44 vs. Harding
- Conference: Lone Star Conference
- Record: 7–5 (2–4 LSC)
- Head coach: Colby Carthel (1st season)
- Offensive coordinator: Matt Storm (1st season)
- Offensive scheme: Spread
- Defensive coordinator: Justin Deason (1st season)
- Base defense: 3–4
- Home stadium: Memorial Stadium

2013 Lone Star Conference football standings
	Conf.			Overall
Team	W		L	W		L
Eastern New Mexico +	5	–	1	7	–	3
Tarleton State +	5	–	1	7	–	3
No. 11 West Texas A&M ^	4	–	2	11	–	3
Midwestern State	3	–	3	7	–	3
Texas A&M–Commerce #	2	–	4	7	–	5
Angelo State	2	–	4	5	–	6
Texas A&M–Kingsville	0	–	6	2	–	8
+ – Conference co-champions; ^ – NCAA Division II playoff participant; # – Live United Texarkana Bowl participant; Rankings from AFCA poll

The 2013 Texas A&M–Commerce Lions football team represented Texas A&M University-Commerce in the 2013 NCAA Division II football season. They were led by head coach Colby Carthel, who was in his first season at A&M-Commerce. The Lions played their home games at Memorial Stadium and were members of the Lone Star Conference (LSC). The Lions finished fifth in the LSC, and their 7–5 record was their first season above .500 since 2001. They were selected to participate in the Live United Texarkana Bowl, their first postseason appearance since the 1995 NCAA Division II playoffs.

== Preseason ==
=== LSC media poll ===
The LSC media poll was released on July 29, 2013. The Lions were predicted to finish last in the conference.

== Schedule ==
Date	Time	Opponent	Site	Result	Attendance
September 7	6:00 p.m.	Sul Ross*	Memorial Stadium; Commerce, TX	W 51–6	3,745
September 13	5:05 p.m.	vs. No. 25 Delta State*	AT&T Stadium; Arlington, TX (LSC Football Festival)	W 45–37	8,194
September 21	6:00 p.m.	at No. 4 West Texas A&M	Kimbrough Memorial Stadium; Canyon, TX (East Texas vs. West Texas)	L 28–62	11,126
September 28	7:15 p.m.	No. 23 Midwestern State	Memorial Stadium; Commerce, TX	L 24–30	2,076
October 5	2:00 p.m.	at Southeastern Oklahoma State*	Paul Laird Field; Durant, OK	W 31–29	2,937
October 12	7:00 p.m.	at Texas A&M–Kingsville	Javelina Stadium; Kingsville, TX (Chennault Cup)	W 41–28	10,500
October 19	6:00 p.m.	McMurry*	Memorial Stadium; Commerce, TX	W 65–43	4,129
October 26	7:00 p.m.	at No. 23 Tarleton State	Memorial Stadium; Stephenville, TX (President's Cup)	W 22–20	6,137
November 2	2:00 p.m.	Angelo State	Memorial Stadium; Commerce, TX	L 20–25	7,195
November 9	3:00 p.m.	at Houston Baptist*	Crusader Stadium; Houston, TX	W 55–21	2,752
November 16	2:00 p.m.	Eastern New Mexico	Memorial Stadium; Commerce, TX	L 35–42	4,528
December 13	6:00 p.m.	vs. Harding*	Razorback Stadium; Texarkana, AR (Live United Texarkana Bowl)	L 3–44	2,217
*Non-conference game; Rankings from AFCA Poll released prior to the game; All times are in Central time

== Postseason awards ==
=== All-Americans ===
- Charlie Tuaau, First Team Defensive Line

=== LSC Superlatives ===
- Defensive Lineman of the Year: Charlie Tuaau
- Defensive Player of the Year: Charlie Tuaau
- Receiver of The Year: Vernon Johnson

=== LSC First Team ===
- Vernon Johnson, Receiver
- Charlie Tuaau, Defensive Line
- Tevin Moore, Defensive Line

=== LSC Second Team ===
- Ronald Fields, Cornerback
- Marcus Fore, Safety
- Cameron Frosch, Punter
- Jordan Jenkins, Tight End
- Vernon Johnson, Return Specialist
- Cole Pitts, Linebacker
- Seth Smith, Receiver

=== LSC Honorable Mention ===
- Stephen Ford, Linebacker
- K.J. Garrett, Running Back
- Trevor Goodale, Offensive Line
- Saul Martinez, Kicker
- Cameron Rogers, Deep Snapper
- Andrew Weidel, Offensive Line
