= 2013 CSU Pueblo ThunderWolves football team =

American college football season

2013 CSU Pueblo ThunderWolves football

RMAC champion

NCAA Division II Second Round, L 30–34 vs. Grand Valley State
- Conference: Rocky Mountain Athletic Conference

Ranking
- AFCA: No. 7
- Record: 11–1 (9–0 RMAC)
- Head coach: John Wristen (6th season)
- Offensive coordinator: Daren Wilkinson (1st season)
- Offensive scheme: Pro-style pistol
- Defensive coordinator: Hunter Hughes (6th season)
- Base defense: 3–4
- Home stadium: Neta and Eddie DeRose ThunderBowl

2013 Rocky Mountain Athletic Conference football standings
	Conf.			Overall
Team	W		L	W		L
No. 7 CSU Pueblo $^	9	–	0	11	–	1
Chadron State	7	–	2	8	–	3
Colorado Mines	7	–	2	8	–	3
Adams State	5	–	4	7	–	4
Colorado Mesa	4	–	5	5	–	6
Western New Mexico	4	–	5	4	–	6
Fort Lewis	3	–	6	4	–	7
Black Hills State	3	–	6	3	–	8
Western State (CO)	2	–	7	2	–	9
New Mexico Highlands	1	–	8	2	–	9
$ – Conference champion; ^ – NCAA Division II playoff participant; Rankings from AFCA poll

The 2013 CSU Pueblo ThunderWolves football team represented Colorado State University Pueblo as a member of the Rocky Mountain Athletic Conference (RMAC) during the 2013 NCAA Division II football season. They were led by sixth year head coach John Wristen and played home games at Neta and Eddie DeRose ThunderBowl.

== Schedule ==
Date	Time	Opponent	Rank	Site	Result	Attendance
September 7	1:35 pm	at Northern Colorado*	No. 8	Nottingham Field; Greeley, CO	W 41–36	4,619
September 14	8:00 pm	at Angelo State*	No. 5	AT&T Stadium; Arlington, TX	W 45–25	16,947
September 21	2:00 pm	Western New Mexico	No. 5	Neta and Eddie DeRose ThunderBowl; Pueblo, CO	W 44–7	6,572
September 28	6:00 pm	at Adams State	No. 5	Rex Field; Alamosa, CO	W 48–7	1,251
October 5	2:00 pm	Fort Lewis^{†}	No. 5	Neta and Eddie DeRose ThunderBowl; Pueblo, CO	W 35–3	6,641
October 12	12:00 pm	at No. 19 Chadron State	No. 5	Elliott Field; Chadron, NE	W 51–42	2,518
October 19	6:00 pm	Colorado Mines	No. 3	Neta and Eddie DeRose ThunderBowl; Pueblo, CO	W 48–28	7,046
October 26	1:00 pm	at Black Hills State	No. 3	Lyle Hare Stadium; Spearfish, SD	W 51–17	1,117
November 2	6:00 pm	Colorado Mesa	No. 3	Neta and Eddie DeRose ThunderBowl; Pueblo, CO	W 34–6	6,324
November 9	2:00 pm	at New Mexico Highlands	No. 3	Perkins Stadium; Las Vegas, NM	W 47–21	898
November 16	2:00 pm	Western State	No. 3	Neta and Eddie DeRose ThunderBowl; Pueblo, CO	W 38–13	6,532
November 30	12:00 pm	No. 22 Grand Valley State*	No. 3	Neta and Eddie DeRose ThunderBowl; Pueblo, CO (NCAA Division II Second Round)	L 30–34	5,287
*Non-conference game; ^{†}Homecoming; Rankings from AFCA Poll released prior to the game; All times are in Mountain time

== Rankings ==
Ranking movements Legend: ██ Increase in ranking ██ Decrease in ranking ( ) = First-place votes
	Week												
Poll	Pre	1	2	3	4	5	6	7	8	9	10	11	Final
AFCA poll	8	5 (1)	5 (1)	5 (1)	5	5 (1)	3 (1)	3	3	3 (1)	3 (1)	3 (1)	7
