= 2013 North Alabama Lions football team =

American college football season

2013 North Alabama Lions football

GSC champion

NCAA Division II Quarterfinal, L 39–42 at Lenoir–Rhyne
- Conference: Gulf South Conference
- Record: 10–3 (5–1 GSC)
- Head coach: Bobby Wallace (12th season)
- Offensive coordinator: Cody Gross (2nd season)
- Defensive coordinator: Chris Willis (2nd season)
- Home stadium: Braly Municipal Stadium

2013 Gulf South Conference football standings
	Conf.			Overall
Team	W		L	W		L
No. 10 North Alabama +^	5	–	1	10	–	3
West Alabama +	5	–	1	8	–	3
Delta State	4	–	2	7	–	3
Valdosta State	3	–	3	6	–	4
West Georgia	3	–	3	6	–	5
Florida Tech	1	–	5	5	–	7
Shorter #	0	–	6	2	–	9
+ – Conference co-champions; ^ – NCAA Division II playoff participant; # – Provisional Division II member; Rankings from AFCA poll

The 2013 North Alabama Lions football team represented the University of North Alabama as a member of the Gulf South Conference (GSC) during the 2013 NCAA Division II football season. Led by 12th-year head Bobby Wallace, the Lions compiled an overall record of 10–3 with a mark of 5–1 in conference play, winning the GCS title. North Alabama advanced to the NCAA Division II football championship playoffs, where the Lions defeated Tuskegee in the first round and UNC Pembroke in the second found before losing to the eventual national runner-up, Lenoir–Rhyne, in the quarterfinals. The team played home games at Braly Municipal Stadium in Florence, Alabama.

== Schedule ==
Date	Time	Opponent	Rank	Site	Result	Attendance
September 5	6:30 p.m.	Miles*		Braly Municipal Stadium; Florence, AL	W 42–7	12,094
September 14	7:00 p.m.	at Jacksonville State*	No. 22	JSU Stadium; Jacksonville, AL	L 21–24	17,592
September 21	6:00 p.m.	Delta State	No. 24	Braly Municipal Stadium; Florence, AL	L 34–37	10,127
October 5	1:30 p.m.	at Shorter		Barron Stadium; Rome, GA	W 41–0	2,800
October 12	6:00 p.m.	West Georgia		Braly Municipal Stadium; Florence, AL	W 38–21	
October 19	6:00 p.m.	Texas A&M–Kingsville*		Braly Municipal Stadium; Florence, AL	W 49–17	7,519
October 26	2:00 p.m.	at No. 11 Valdosta State		Bazemore–Hyder Stadium; Valdosta, GA	W 57–7	4,827
November 2	3:00 p.m.	No. 20 West Alabama		Braly Municipal Stadium; Florence, AL (rivalry)	W 30–27 ^{OT}	12,526
November 9	2:00 p.m.	at Florida Tech	No. 24	Pirate Stadium; Melbourne, FL	W 55–28	2,867
November 16	2:00 p.m.	at Tarleton State*	No. 20	Memorial Stadium; Stephenville, TX	W 44–7	2,139
November 23	12:00 p.m.	Tuskegee*	No. 16	Braly Municipal Stadium; Florence, AL (NCAA Division II First Round)	W 30–27	6,763
November 30	12:00 p.m.	at No. 8 UNC Pembroke*	No. 16	Grace P. Johnson Stadium; Pembroke, NC (NCAA Division II Second Round)	W 37–13	2,184
December 7	12:00 p.m.	at No. 13 Lenoir–Rhyne*	No. 16	Moretz Stadium; Hickory, NC (NCAA Division II Quarterfinal)	L 39–42	2,500
*Non-conference game; Rankings from AFCA Poll released prior to the game; All times are in Central time
