= 2013 NCAA Division II football season =

- Total No. of teams: 168
- Regular season: August 31 – November 16, 2013
- Playoffs: November 23 – December 21, 2013
- National Championship: Braly Municipal Stadium; Florence, AL, December 21, 2013
- Champion: Northwest Missouri State (4)
- Harlon Hill Trophy: Franklyn Quiteh, Bloomsburg (RB)

The 2013 NCAA Division II football season, part of college football in the United States organized by the National Collegiate Athletic Association at the Division II level, began on August 31, 2013, and concluded with the National Championship Game of the NCAA Division II Football Championship on December 21, 2013, at Braly Municipal Stadium in Florence, Alabama. This was the final championship played in Florence, after twenty-eight straight finals, before the game moves to Sporting Park in Kansas City, Kansas. The Northwest Missouri State Bearcats defeated the Lenoir–Rhyne Bears, 43–28, to win their fourth national title.

The 2013 Harlon Hill Trophy was awarded to running back Franklyn Quiteh from Bloomsburg.

== Conference and program changes ==
- It was the first season for the Mountain East Conference, a league founded by eight schools that announced in June 2012 that they would leave the West Virginia Intercollegiate Athletic Conference (WVIAC)—a move that led to the demise of the WVIAC. These eight schools were soon joined by three other football-playing schools, plus one non-football WVIAC member that had been left out of the original split.

School	Former conference	New conference
Abilene Christian	Lone Star	Southland (FCS)
Alderson Broaddus	New program	Independent
Central State	GLVC	SIAC
Charleston	WVIAC	Mountain East
Concord	WVIAC	Mountain East
Fairmont State	WVIAC	Mountain East
Florida Tech	New program	Gulf South
Glenville State College	WVIAC	Mountain East
Incarnate Word	Lone Star	Southland (FCS)
LIU Post	PSAC	NE10
Notre Dame (OH)	GLIAC	Mountain East
Northwestern Oklahoma State	Independent	Great American
Seton Hill	WVIAC	PSAC
Shepherd	WVIAC	Mountain East
Southern Nazarene	Independent	Great American
Truman	MIAA	GLVC
Urbana	GLVC	Mountain East
Virginia–Wise	Mid-South (NAIA)	Mountain East
West Liberty	WVIAC	Mountain East
West Virginia State	WVIAC	Mountain East
West Virginia Wesleyan	WVIAC	Mountain East

Black Hills State, Lindenwood, Malone, McKendree, South Dakota Mines, and Walsh completed their transitions to Division II and became eligible for the postseason.

== Conference standings ==
=== Super Region 1 ===
2013 Central Intercollegiate Athletic Association football standings
	Conf.			Overall
Team	W		L	W		L
Northern Division
Virginia State x	7	–	0	9	–	1
Elizabeth City State	4	–	3	4	–	6
Bowie State	3	–	4	5	–	5
Chowan	3	–	4	4	–	6
Virginia Union	3	–	4	3	–	7
Lincoln (PA)	0	–	7	1	–	9
Southern Division
No. 14 Winston-Salem State x$^	7	–	0	10	–	2
Fayetteville State	5	–	2	6	–	4
Shaw	4	–	3	6	–	4
St. Augustine's	4	–	3	6	–	4
Johnson C. Smith	3	–	4	4	–	6
Livingstone	1	–	6	3	–	7
Championship: Winston-Salem State 1, Virginia State 0 (forfeit)
$ – Conference champion; x – Division champion/co-champions; y – Championship game participant; ^ – NCAA Division II playoff participant; As a result of an attack by Virginia State players on a Winston-Salem State player during a CIAA luncheon before the conference championship game, the conference ruled Virginia State ineligible for postseason and awarded Winston-Salem State the conference championship.; Rankings from AFCA poll

2013 Mountain East Conference football standings
	Conf.			Overall
Team	W		L	W		L
No. 9 Shepherd $^	9	–	0	11	–	1
Concord	7	–	2	8	–	3
Urbana	7	–	2	7	–	4
Charleston (WV)	6	–	3	6	–	5
Glenville State	5	–	4	6	–	5
West Virginia Wesleyan	5	–	4	5	–	5
Notre Dame (OH)	4	–	5	5	–	6
West Liberty	3	–	6	3	–	8
Fairmont State	2	–	7	3	–	7
Virginia–Wise #	2	–	7	2	–	9
West Virginia State	0	–	10	0	–	11
$ – Conference champion; ^ – NCAA Division II playoff participant; # – Provisional NCAA Division II member; Rankings from AFCA poll

2013 Northeast-10 Conference football standings
	Conf.			Overall
Team	W		L	W		L
American International y$^	8	–	1	9	–	3
Stonehill y	8	–	1	8	–	3
New Haven	7	–	2	8	–	3
Assumption	6	–	3	6	–	5
Merrimack	5	–	4	7	–	4
Bentley	4	–	5	6	–	5
LIU Post	3	–	6	5	–	6
Southern Connecticut	3	–	6	3	–	8
Saint Anselm	1	–	8	1	–	10
Pace	0	–	9	0	–	11
Championship: American International 27, Stonehill 17
$ – Conference champion; y – Championship game participant; ^ – NCAA Division II playoff participant

2013 Pennsylvania State Athletic Conference football standings
	Conf.			Overall
Team	W		L	W		L
East
No. 16 Bloomsburg xy$^	6	–	1	10	–	2
No. 4 West Chester x^	6	–	1	13	–	2
Shippensburg x	6	–	1	7	–	4
East Stroudsburg	4	–	3	7	–	4
Kutztown	3	–	4	4	–	7
Lock Haven	2	–	5	3	–	8
Millersville	1	–	6	1	–	10
Cheyney	0	–	7	0	–	11
West
No. 21 Slippery Rock xy^	6	–	1	9	–	3
No. 24 IUP	5	–	2	9	–	2
California (PA)	4	–	3	7	–	4
Mercyhurst	4	–	3	7	–	4
Gannon	4	–	3	6	–	5
Edinboro	3	–	4	5	–	6
Clarion	2	–	5	4	–	7
Seton Hill	0	–	7	1	–	10
Championship: Bloomsburg 42, Slippery Rock 38
$ – Conference champion; x – Division champion/co-champions; y – Championship game participant; ^ – NCAA Division II playoff participant; Rankings from AFCA poll

=== Super Region 2 ===
2013 Gulf South Conference football standings
	Conf.			Overall
Team	W		L	W		L
No. 10 North Alabama +^	5	–	1	10	–	3
West Alabama +	5	–	1	8	–	3
Delta State	4	–	2	7	–	3
Valdosta State	3	–	3	6	–	4
West Georgia	3	–	3	6	–	5
Florida Tech	1	–	5	5	–	7
Shorter #	0	–	6	2	–	9
+ – Conference co-champions; ^ – NCAA Division II playoff participant; # – Provisional Division II member; Rankings from AFCA poll

2013 South Atlantic Conference football standings
	Conf.			Overall
Team	W		L	W		L
No. 2 Lenoir–Rhyne $^	7	–	0	13	–	2
No. 17 Carson–Newman ^	5	–	2	10	–	3
No. 23 Newberry ^	5	–	2	9	–	3
Catawba	3	–	4	6	–	5
Wingate	3	–	4	4	–	6
Tusculum	2	–	5	4	–	7
Brevard	2	–	5	3	–	8
Mars Hill	1	–	6	3	–	8
$ – Conference champion; ^ – NCAA Division II playoff participant; Rankings from AFCA Poll

2013 Southern Intercollegiate Athletic Conference football standings
	Conf.			Overall
Team	W		L	W		L
East Division
Albany State xy$	4	–	0	5	–	4
Fort Valley State	3	–	1	4	–	6
Benedict	2	–	2	4	–	6
Clark Atlanta	1	–	2	3	–	7
Morehouse	0	–	4	2	–	8
West Division
No. 25 Tuskegee x^	4	–	1	8	–	2
Miles xy	4	–	1	6	–	4
Lane	2	–	3	6	–	4
Stillman	2	–	3	6	–	5
Central State (OH)	2	–	3	2	–	8
Kentucky State	1	–	4	5	–	5
Championship: Albany State 17, Miles 14
$ – Conference champion; x – Division champion/co-champions; y – Championship game participant; ^ – NCAA Division II playoff participant; Rankings from AFCA poll

2013 NCAA Division II Super Region 2 independents football records
	Conf.			Overall
Team	W		L	W		L
No. 15 UNC Pembroke ^		–		9	–	2
North Greenville		–		5	–	6
^ – NCAA Division II playoff participant; Rankings from AFCA poll

=== Super Region 3 ===
2013 Great American Conference football standings
	Conf.			Overall
Team	W		L	W		L
No. 13 Henderson State $^	10	–	0	11	–	1
Harding #	8	–	2	9	–	2
Ouachita Baptist	7	–	3	7	–	3
Southern Arkansas	6	–	4	6	–	4
SW Oklahoma State	6	–	4	6	–	5
East Central	5	–	5	5	–	5
Arkansas Tech	5	–	5	5	–	6
Arkansas–Monticello	4	–	6	5	–	6
NW Oklahoma State *	2	–	8	2	–	9
SE Oklahoma State	2	–	8	2	–	9
Southern Nazarene	0	–	10	0	–	11
$ – Conference champion; ^ – NCAA Division II playoff participant; # – Live United Texarkana Bowl participant * – Provisional NCAA Division II member; Rankings from AFCA poll

2013 Great Northwest Athletic Conference football standings
	Conf.			Overall
Team	W		L	W		L
Azusa Pacific $#	9	–	1	9	–	2
Central Washington	7	–	3	7	–	4
Western Oregon	7	–	3	7	–	4
Dixie State	4	–	6	4	–	7
Simon Fraser	3	–	7	3	–	7
Humboldt State	0	–	10	0	–	11
$ – Conference champion; # – Provisional NCAA Division II member

2013 Mid-America Intercollegiate Athletics Association football standings
	Conf.			Overall
Team	W		L	W		L
No. 1 NW Missouri State $^	10	–	0	15	–	0
No. 20 Emporia State ^	9	–	1	9	–	2
No. 19 Pittsburg State #	7	–	2	10	–	2
Missouri Western	7	–	3	8	–	3
Washburn	7	–	3	8	–	3
Missouri Southern	5	–	3	7	–	3
Central Missouri	5	–	4	6	–	4
Fort Hays State	4	–	5	6	–	5
Nebraska–Kearney	3	–	6	3	–	8
Lindenwood	2	–	6	3	–	6
Lincoln (MO)	2	–	8	3	–	8
Central Oklahoma	2	–	8	2	–	8
Northeastern State	2	–	8	2	–	9
Southwest Baptist	1	–	9	1	–	10
$ – Conference champion; ^ – NCAA Division II playoff participant; # – Mineral Water Bowl participant; Rankings from AFCA poll

2013 Northern Sun Intercollegiate Conference football standings
	Conf.			Overall
Team	W		L	W		L
North Division
No. 5 St. Cloud State ^	10	–	1	12	–	2
No. 8 Minnesota–Duluth ^	10	–	1	11	–	2
Mary	6	–	5	6	–	5
Minnesota State–Moorhead	4	–	7	4	–	7
Northern State	4	–	7	4	–	7
Minnesota–Crookston	2	–	9	2	–	9
Bemidji State	3	–	8	3	–	8
Minot State	2	–	9	2	–	9
South Division
No. 6 Minnesota State $^	11	–	0	11	–	1
SW Minnesota State #	7	–	4	7	–	5
Winona State	6	–	5	6	–	5
Sioux Falls	6	–	5	6	–	5
Upper Iowa	6	–	5	6	–	5
Concordia–St. Paul	5	–	6	5	–	6
Augustana (SD)	4	–	7	4	–	7
Wayne State (NE)	2	–	9	2	–	9
$ – Conference champion; ^ – NCAA Division II playoff participant; # – Mineral Water Bowl participant; Rankings from AFCA poll

=== Super Region 4 ===
2013 Great Lakes Intercollegiate Athletic Conference football standings
	Conf.			Overall
Team	W		L	W		L
North
No. 22 Saginaw Valley State ^	9	–	1	9	–	3
Ferris State	8	–	2	8	–	3
No. 3 Grand Valley State ^	7	–	2	12	–	3
Michigan Tech	6	–	4	6	–	4
Hillsdale	5	–	4	5	–	6
Northern Michigan	3	–	7	3	–	7
Wayne State (MI)	3	–	7	3	–	8
Northwood	1	–	8	2	–	9
South
No. 12 Ohio Dominican $^	9	–	0	10	–	1
Findlay	6	–	3	8	–	3
Ashland	5	–	4	5	–	5
Lake Erie	3	–	6	4	–	7
Walsh	3	–	6	3	–	8
Malone	1	–	8	2	–	9
Tiffin	1	–	8	2	–	9
$ – Conference champion; ^ – NCAA Division II playoff participant; Rankings from AFCA poll

2013 Great Lakes Valley Conference football standings
	Conf.			Overall
Team	W		L	W		L
No. 18 Indianapolis $^	7	–	0	10	–	2
Saint Joseph's (IN)	5	–	2	8	–	3
Truman State	5	–	2	7	–	4
Missouri S&T	5	–	2	6	–	5
McKendree	3	–	4	4	–	6
William Jewell	2	–	5	3	–	8
Quincy	1	–	6	2	–	9
Kentucky Wesleyan	0	–	7	0	–	11
$ – Conference champion; ^ – NCAA Division II playoff participant; Rankings from AFCA poll

2013 Lone Star Conference football standings
	Conf.			Overall
Team	W		L	W		L
Eastern New Mexico +	5	–	1	7	–	3
Tarleton State +	5	–	1	7	–	3
No. 11 West Texas A&M ^	4	–	2	11	–	3
Midwestern State	3	–	3	7	–	3
Texas A&M–Commerce #	2	–	4	7	–	5
Angelo State	2	–	4	5	–	6
Texas A&M–Kingsville	0	–	6	2	–	8
+ – Conference co-champions; ^ – NCAA Division II playoff participant; # – Live United Texarkana Bowl participant; Rankings from AFCA poll

2013 Rocky Mountain Athletic Conference football standings
	Conf.			Overall
Team	W		L	W		L
No. 7 CSU Pueblo $^	9	–	0	11	–	1
Chadron State	7	–	2	8	–	3
Colorado Mines	7	–	2	8	–	3
Adams State	5	–	4	7	–	4
Colorado Mesa	4	–	5	5	–	6
Western New Mexico	4	–	5	4	–	6
Fort Lewis	3	–	6	4	–	7
Black Hills State	3	–	6	3	–	8
Western State (CO)	2	–	7	2	–	9
New Mexico Highlands	1	–	8	2	–	9
$ – Conference champion; ^ – NCAA Division II playoff participant; Rankings from AFCA poll

2013 NCAA Division II Super Region 4 independents football records
	Conf.			Overall
Team	W		L	W		L
South Dakota Mines		–		6	–	4
Alderson Broaddus		–		4	–	6
OK Panhandle State		–		4	–	7
McMurry #		–		3	–	8
# – Provisional NCAA Division II member

== Conference summaries ==
Conference Champions

Central Intercollegiate Athletic Association – Winston-Salem State (10–2, 7–0)

Following an attack on Winston-Salem State players by Virginia State players during a news conference before the CIAA Championship Game at Bowman Gray Stadium during the week, the CIAA declared Virginia State ineligible. Winston-Salem State was awarded the championship by forfeit.

Great American Conference – Henderson State (11–1, 10–0)

Great Lakes Intercollegiate Athletic Conference – Ohio Dominican (10–1, 9–0)

Great Lakes Valley Conference – Indianapolis (10–2, 7–0)

Great Northwest Athletic Conference – Azusa Pacific (10–2, 9–1)

Gulf South Conference – North Alabama (10–3, 5–1) and West Alabama (8–3, 5–1)

Lone Star Conference – Eastern New Mexico (7–3, 5–1) and Tarleton State (7–3, 5–1)

Mid-America Intercollegiate Athletics Association – Northwest Missouri State (14–0, 10–0)

Mountain East Conference – Shepherd (11–1, 9–0)

Northeast-10 Conference – American International (9–3, 8–1) and Stonehill (8–3, 8–1)

Northern Sun Intercollegiate Conference – Minnesota State (11–1, 10–0)

Pennsylvania State Athletic Conference – Bloomsburg (10–2, 6–1)

Rocky Mountain Athletic Conference – CSU Pueblo (11–1, 9–0)

South Atlantic Conference – Lenoir-Rhyne (13–1, 7–0)

Southern Intercollegiate Athletic Conference – Albany State (5–4, 4–0)

== Postseason ==
2013 NCAA Division II Football Championship
- Teams: 24
- Finals Site: Braly Municipal Stadium; Florence, Alabama
- Champion: Northwest Missouri State; (4th title, title game)
- Runner-up: Lenoir–Rhyne; (1st title game)
- Semifinalists: West Chester; Grand Valley State
- Winning coach: championship

The 2013 NCAA Division II National Football Championship playoffs involved 24 schools playing in a single-elimination tournament to determine the national champion of men's NCAA Division II college football. The tournament began on November 23, 2013 and concluded on December 21, 2013 with the 2013 NCAA Division II National Football Championship game at Braly Municipal Stadium near the campus of the University of North Alabama in Florence, Alabama.

=== Format ===
Two teams in each super regional earned first-round byes. The first-round winners advanced to face a bye team in their super regional. Second-round winners met in the quarterfinals and quarterfinal winners advanced to play in the semifinals. First-round, second-round, quarterfinal and semifinal games were played on the campus of one of the competing institutions as determined by the NCAA Division II Football Committee. The home team at the championship was determined by the Division II Football Committee and the Shoals National Championship Committee.

=== Participants ===
==== Teams ====
School	Conference	Regular season record
American International	Northeast-10 Conference	9–2
Bloomsburg	Pennsylvania State Athletic Conference	10–1
Carson-Newman	South Atlantic Conference	10–2
CSU Pueblo	Rocky Mountain Athletic Conference	11–0
Emporia State	Mid-America Intercollegiate Athletics Association	9–1
Grand Valley State	Great Lakes Intercollegiate Athletic Conference	9–2
Henderson State	Great American Conference	11–0
Indianapolis	Great Lakes Valley Conference	10–0
Lenoir-Rhyne	South Atlantic Conference	10–1
Minnesota State Mankato	Northern Sun Intercollegiate Conference	11–0
Minnesota Duluth	Northern Sun Intercollegiate Conference	10–1
Newberry	South Atlantic Conference	9–2
North Alabama	Gulf South Conference	8–2
Northwest Missouri State	Mid-America Intercollegiate Athletics Association	11–0
Ohio Dominican	Great Lakes Intercollegiate Athletic Conference	10–0
Saginaw Valley State	Great Lakes Intercollegiate Athletic Conference	9–2
Shepherd	Mountain East Conference	10–0
Slippery Rock	Pennsylvania State Athletic Conference	9–2
St. Cloud State	Northern Sun Intercollegiate Conference	10–1
Tuskegee	Southern Intercollegiate Athletic Conference	8–2
UNC Pembroke	Independent	9–1
West Chester	Pennsylvania State Athletic Conference	10–1
West Texas A&M	Lone Star Conference	9–2
Winston-Salem State	Central Intercollegiate Athletic Association	10–1

==== Bids by conference ====
Conference	Total	Schools	Super Region
Central Intercollegiate Athletic Association	1	Winston-Salem State	1
Great American Conference	1	Henderson State	3
Great Lakes Intercollegiate Athletic Conference	3	Grand Valley State; Ohio Dominican; Saginaw Valley State	4
Great Lakes Valley Conference	1	Indianapolis	4
Gulf South Conference	1	North Alabama	2
Independent	1	UNC Pembroke	2
Lone Star Conference	1	West Texas A&M	4
Mid-America Intercollegiate Athletics Association	2	Northwest Missouri State; Emporia State	3
Mountain East Conference	1	Shepherd	1
Northeast-10 Conference	1	American International	1
Northern Sun Intercollegiate Conference	3	Minnesota State Mankato; Minnesota Duluth; St. Cloud State	3
Pennsylvania State Athletic Conference	3	Bloomsburg; Slippery Rock; West Chester	1
Rocky Mountain Athletic Conference	1	CSU Pueblo	4
South Atlantic Conference	3	Carson-Newman; Lenoir-Rhyne; Newberry	2
Southern Intercollegiate Athletic Conference	1	Tuskegee	2

=== Bracket ===
First Round; November 23; Campus Sites	Second Round; November 30; Campus Sites
1	Shepherd *	7
4	Winston-Salem State	0
4	Winston-Salem State *	27
5	Slippery Rock	20
Super Region 1
2	Bloomsburg*	38
3	West Chester	40
3	West Chester*	38
6	American International	7
1	Lenoir–Rhyne*	27
4	Carson-Newman	20
4	Carson–Newman*	37
5	Newberry	27
Super Region 2
2	UNC Pembroke*	13
6	North Alabama	37
3	North Alabama*	30
6	Tuskegee	27
1	Northwest Missouri State *	45
4	Minnesota Duluth	21
4	Minnesota Duluth *	55
5	Emporia State	13
Super Region 3
2	Minnesota State*	48
6	St. Cloud State	54
3	Henderson State*	35
6	St. Cloud State	40
1	CSU Pueblo*	30
4	Grand Valley State	34
4	Grand Valley State *	40
5	Saginaw Valley State	7
Super Region 4
2	Ohio Dominican*	27
6	West Texas A&M	34
3	Indianapolis*	14
6	West Texas A&M	27

Quarterfinals; December 7 Campus Sites
1	Shepherd*	7
3	West Chester	28
1	Lenoir-Rhyne*	42
3	North Alabama	39
1	Northwest Missouri State*	59
6	St. Cloud State	21
4	Grand Valley State*	35
6	West Texas A&M	28

Semifinals; December 14; Campus Sites
SR1	West Chester	14
SR2	Lenoir-Rhyne*	42
SR3	Northwest Missouri State*	27
SR4	Grand Valley State	13

National Championship Game; December 21; Braly Municipal Stadium, Florence, Alabama
SR2	Lenoir-Rhyne	28
SR3	Northwest Missouri State	43

* Home team Winner

=== Playoff standings ===
2013 NCAA Division II National Football Championship game
Lenoir-Rhyne Bears	NW Missouri St. Bearcats
(13–1)	(14–0)
28	43
Head coach: Mike Houston	Head coach: Adam Dorrel
	1	2	3	4	Total
Lenoir-Rhyne	7	0	7	14	28
NW Missouri St.	17	5	7	14	43
- Date: December 21, 2013
- Stadium: Braly Municipal Stadium
- Location: Florence, Alabama
- Attendance: 6,543

United States TV coverage
- Network: ESPN2

Place	School
1st	Northwest Missouri State
2nd	Lenoir-Rhyne
3rd	Grand Valley State
3rd	West Chester
5th	Shepherd
5th	North Alabama
5th	St. Cloud State
5th	West Texas A&M
9th	Bloomsburg
9th	Carson-Newman
9th	CSU Pueblo
9th	Minnesota Duluth
9th	Minnesota State Mankato
9th	Ohio Dominican
9th	UNC Pembroke
9th	Winston-Salem State
17th	American International
17th	Emporia State
17th	Henderson State
17th	Indianapolis
17th	Newberry
17th	Saginaw Valley State
17th	Slippery Rock
17th	Tuskegee

== See also ==
- 2013 NCAA Division I FBS football season
- 2013 NCAA Division I FCS football season
- 2013 NCAA Division III football season
- 2013 NAIA football season
