= 2013 Valdosta State Blazers football team =

American college football season

2013 Valdosta State Blazers football
- Conference: Gulf South Conference
- Record: 6–4 (3–3 GSC)
- Head coach: David Dean (7th season)
- Offensive coordinator: Andy Richman (1st season)
- Defensive coordinator: Seth Wallace (4th season)
- Home stadium: Bazemore–Hyder Stadium

2013 Gulf South Conference football standings
	Conf.			Overall
Team	W		L	W		L
No. 10 North Alabama +^	5	–	1	10	–	3
West Alabama +	5	–	1	8	–	3
Delta State	4	–	2	7	–	3
Valdosta State	3	–	3	6	–	4
West Georgia	3	–	3	6	–	5
Florida Tech	1	–	5	5	–	7
Shorter #	0	–	6	2	–	9
+ – Conference co-champions; ^ – NCAA Division II playoff participant; # – Provisional Division II member; Rankings from AFCA poll

The 2013 Valdosta State Blazers football team represented Valdosta State University as a member of the Gulf South Conference (GSC) during the 2013 NCAA Division II football season. They were led by seventh year head coach David Dean and played their home games at Bazemore–Hyder Stadium in Valdosta, Georgia. The Blazers began the 2013 season ranked first in the American Football Coaches Association poll, the third time the Blazers have opened the season at No. 1. Valdosta State compiled an overall record of 6–4 with a mark of 3–3 in conference play, tying for fourth place in the GSC.

== Schedule ==
Date	Time	Opponent	Rank	Site	Result	Attendance
September 7	2:00 pm	at Fort Valley State*	No. 1	Henderson Stadium; Macon, GA	W 36–21	5,161
September 21	7:00 pm	Shorter	No. 1	Bazemore–Hyder Stadium; Valdosta, GA	W 41–0	3,912
September 28	7:00 pm	Angelo State*	No. 1	Bazemore–Hyder Stadium; Valdosta, GA	W 37–3	3,806
October 5	3:00 pm	Florida Tech^{†}	No. 1	Bazemore–Hyder Stadium; Valdosta, GA	W 52–14	7,612
October 10	7:30 pm	West Alabama	No. 1	Tiger Stadium; Livingston, AL	L 30–49	5,646
October 19	2:00 pm	at West Georgia	No. 12	University Stadium; Carrollton, GA (rivalry)	W 35–30	4,788
October 26	2:00 pm	North Alabama	No. 11	Bazemore–Hyder Stadium; Valdosta, GA	L 7–57	4,827
November 2	5:00 pm	at Delta State		Parker–McCool Stadium; Cleveland, MS	L 55–63	7,213
November 7	7:30 pm	UNC Pembroke*		Bazemore–Hyder Stadium; Valdosta, GA	L 29–34	2,527
November 16	8:00 pm	at Texas A&M–Kingsville*		Javelina Stadium; Kingsville, TX	W 35–27	7,500
*Non-conference game; ^{†}Homecoming; Rankings from American Football Coaches Association Poll released prior to the game; All times are in Eastern time
