= 2013 Florida Tech Panthers football team =

American college football season

2013 Florida Tech Panthers football
- Conference: Gulf South Conference
- Record: 5–7 (1–5 GSC)
- Head coach: Steve Englehart (1st season)
- Offensive coordinator: Jayson Martin (1st season)
- Defensive coordinator: Willie Tillman (1st season)
- Home stadium: Pirate Stadium

2013 Gulf South Conference football standings
	Conf.			Overall
Team	W		L	W		L
No. 10 North Alabama +^	5	–	1	10	–	3
West Alabama +	5	–	1	8	–	3
Delta State	4	–	2	7	–	3
Valdosta State	3	–	3	6	–	4
West Georgia	3	–	3	6	–	5
Florida Tech	1	–	5	5	–	7
Shorter #	0	–	6	2	–	9
+ – Conference co-champions; ^ – NCAA Division II playoff participant; # – Provisional Division II member; Rankings from AFCA poll

The 2013 Florida Tech Panthers football team represented the Florida Institute of Technology (FIT) during the NCAA Division II football season. They were led by head coach Steve Englehart, who was in his first year at Florida Tech. The Panthers played their home games at Pirate Stadium, approximately one mile from the Florida Tech campus and were a member of the Gulf South Conference. The 2013 season was the Panthers' first, after having football approved at FIT in April, 2010.

In a season full of firsts, the Panthers memorably won their first ever game by defeating Stetson, 20-13, on a touchdown with 1:09 to play. Later on, they would earn their first GSC win in dramatic fashion by scoring 21 unanswered fourth quarter points to defeat Shorter, 28-24. They would cap their inaugural campaign by winning on the road for the first time in their first ever bowl game in a 32-20 win over Alderson-Broaddus in the ECAC Futures Bowl.

== Schedule ==
Date	Time	Opponent	Site	TV	Result	Attendance
September 7	7:00 pm	Stetson*	Pirate Stadium; Melbourne, FL		W 20-13	5,400
September 14	1:00 pm	at Newberry*	Setzler Field; Newberry, SC		L 19–23	2,544
September 19	8:00 pm	No. 16 West Alabama	Pirate Stadium; Melbourne, FL	CBSSN	L 3–45	4,812
September 28	6:00 pm	at Delta State*	Parker–McCool Stadium; Cleveland, MS		L 31–52	8,012
October 5	3:00 pm	at No. 1 Valdosta State	Bazemore-Hyder Stadium; Valdosta, GA		L 14–52	7,612
October 12	1:00 pm	at Ave Maria*	AMU Football Field; Ave Maria, FL		L 41–45	1,345
October 19	2:00 pm	Shorter	Pirate Stadium; Melbourne, FL		W 28–24	4,000
October 26	1:00 pm	Warner*^{†}	Pirate Stadium; Melbourne, FL		W 37–3	3,975
October 31	7:35 pm	at West Georgia	University Stadium; Carrollton, GA	ESPN3	L 14–28	2,611
November 9	2:00 pm	No. 24 North Alabama	Pirate Stadium; Melbourne, FL		L 28–55	2,867
November 16	2:00 pm	Webber International*	Pirate Stadium; Melbourne, FL		W 17–3	2,641
November 23	2:00 pm	at Alderson Broaddus*	AB Stadium; Philippi, WV (ECAC Futures Bowl)		W 32-20	1,002
*Non-conference game; ^{†}Homecoming; Rankings from Coaches' Poll released prior to the game

== Game summaries ==
=== Stetson ===
	1	2	3	4	Total
Hatters	7	3	0	3	13
Panthers	0	3	3	14	20

=== At Newberry ===
	1	2	3	4	Total
Panthers	3	10	0	6	19
Wolves	0	7	14	2	23

=== West Alabama ===
	1	2	3	4	Total
Tigers	14	14	10	7	45
Panthers	0	3	0	0	3

=== At Delta State ===
	1	2	3	4	Total
Panthers	0	10	14	7	31
Statesmen	7	14	10	21	52

=== At Valdosta State ===
	1	2	3	4	Total
Panthers	0	0	7	7	14
Blazers	10	7	28	7	52

=== At Ave Maria ===
	1	2	3	4	Total
Panthers	3	24	7	7	41
Gyrenes	7	7	10	21	45

=== Shorter ===
	1	2	3	4	Total
Hawks	7	10	7	0	24
Panthers	7	0	0	21	28

=== Warner ===
	1	2	3	4	Total
Royals	3	0	0	0	3
Panthers	7	10	7	13	37

=== At West Georgia ===
	1	2	3	4	Total
Panthers	0	7	7	0	14
Wolves	7	14	0	7	28

=== North Alabama ===
	1	2	3	4	Total
Lions	14	20	14	7	55
Panthers	7	7	7	7	28

=== Webber International ===
	1	2	3	4	Total
Warriors	0	0	0	3	3
Panthers	0	3	7	7	17

=== At Alderson-Broaddus ===
	1	2	3	4	Total
Panthers	7	9	13	3	32
Battlers	3	14	3	0	20

== Awards and milestones ==
=== Gulf South Conference honors ===
Eight players from Florida Tech were honored as All-GSC selections by the league's coaches. Linebacker Chris Stapleton was named the GSC Defensive Freshman of the Year, becoming the first Panther to receive any such honor.

- Gulf South Conference Defensive Freshman of the Year: LB Chris Stapleton

==== Gulf South Conference All-Conference First Team ====
- Xavier Milton, WR
- Gabe Hughes, TE

==== Gulf South Conference All-Conference Second Team ====
- Bobby Vega, QB
- Ramsey Sellers, G
- Skylar Sheffield, DL
- Justin Arcune, LB
- Chris Stapleton, LB
- Manny Abad, DB

==== Gulf South Conference special teams player of the week ====
- September 16: Brion Ashley
