= Torrence Allen =

American football player (born 1991)

No. 3
- Position: Wide receiver

Personal information
- Born: March 31, 1991 (age 35); Clifton, Texas, U.S.
- Listed height: 6 ft 0 in (1.83 m)
- Listed weight: 183 lb (83 kg)

Career information
- College: West Texas A&M
- NFL draft: 2014: undrafted

Career history
- San Diego Chargers (2014–2016)*
- * Offseason or practice squad member only
- Stats at Pro Football Reference

Torrence Allen (born March 31, 1991) is an American former professional football wide receiver. He was born in Clifton, Texas, and attended Meridian High School in Meridian, Texas. He graduated from West Texas A&M University. As a senior, he was a Lone Star Conference co-receiver of the year, all-conference first-team, and Daktronics All-Super Region Four player. He has spent time with the San Diego Chargers.

== Professional career ==
On May 13, 2014, Allen signed with the San Diego Chargers as an undrafted free agent. On August 31, he was cut but signed to the practice squad the next day. On December 29, 2014, Allen signed a reserve/future contract.

On September 1, 2015, Allen was waived with an injury designation after suffering a foot injury and was placed on injured reserve the next day. On January 2, 2016, he was cut but signed a reserve/future contract three days later.

On August 29, 2016, he was cut.
