= Dustin Vaughan =

American football player (born 1991)

- Vaughan with the Dallas Cowboys in 2014

No. 10
- Position: Quarterback

Personal information
- Born: January 27, 1991 (age 35); Corpus Christi, Texas
- Listed height: 6 ft 5 in (1.96 m)
- Listed weight: 234 lb (106 kg)

Career information
- High school: Corpus Christi (TX) Calallen
- College: West Texas A&M
- NFL draft: 2014: undrafted

Career history
- Dallas Cowboys (2014); Buffalo Bills (2015)*; Pittsburgh Steelers (2016)*; Baltimore Ravens (2016–2017)*; San Antonio Commanders (2019)
- * Offseason or practice squad member only

Awards and highlights
- Honorable-mention All-LSC (2011); 2× All-LSC (2012, 2013); 2× LSC Offensive Player of the Year (2012, 2013); LSC Male Athlete of the Year (2013)
- Stats at Pro Football Reference

Dustin Vaughan (born January 27, 1991) is a former American football quarterback. He was signed by the Dallas Cowboys as an undrafted free agent in 2014. He played college football at West Texas A&M University.

== Early life ==
Vaughan attended Calallen High School. As a senior, he was named first-team All-District 31-4A at both quarterback and punter. He also received All-Metro, All-South Texas and All-State academic honors.

He practiced basketball and baseball. He helped the baseball team win the class 4A state championship.

== College career ==
Vaughan accepted a football scholarship from Division II West Texas A&M University. As a redshirt freshman, he was the third-string quarterback and appeared in 4 games.

As a sophomore, he became the starter in the second game of the season, leading the team to an 8–3 record and a win in the Kanza Bowl over the University of Central Missouri. He registered 227-for-382 completions for 3,316 yards, 25 touchdowns and 6 interceptions. He had 384 passing yards and 3 touchdowns in a 42–21 win against #5 Texas A&M University–Kingsville. He had 430 passing yards, 4 touchdowns and 21 rushing yards in a 49–35 win over Central Washington University.

As a junior, he helped the team reach the NCAA Semifinal for the first time in school history. He posted 359-for-555 completions for 4,712 yards (third in school history), 45 touchdowns (second in school history) and 13 interceptions. He had 409 passing yards and 5 touchdown passes against Western State University. He also had 5 touchdown passes against the University of West Georgia.

As a senior, he was the runner-up for the Harlon Hill Trophy. He recorded 5,401 passing yards (Division II record) and 53 touchdowns (school record and third-most all-time in Division II). He finished his college career with conference and school records for passing yards, (13,525), total yards (13,608) and passing touchdowns (123).

Vaughan graduated from West Texas A&M with a Bachelor's of Science in Pre-Medicine in 2013. He later earned a Master's degree in Business Administration and Management in 2021.

== Professional career ==
=== Dallas Cowboys ===
Vaughan was signed as an undrafted free agent by the Dallas Cowboys after the 2014 NFL draft. He surprised observers by making the team as the third-string quarterback.

On September 5, 2015, he was waived after the team decided to carry just two quarterbacks on the regular season roster. The Cowboys opted not to add him to the practice squad, choosing instead to sign quarterback Kellen Moore, who had previous experience with the team's offensive coordinator Scott Linehan.

=== Buffalo Bills ===
On September 23, 2015, he was signed to the Buffalo Bills' practice squad. On October 19, he was released by the Bills to make room for wide receiver Titus Davis.

=== Pittsburgh Steelers ===
On January 22, 2016, Vaughan signed a futures contract with the Pittsburgh Steelers. On August 28, he was waived-injured by the Steelers after suffering a thumb fracture in a preseason game against the Philadelphia Eagles and on September 2, he was released from injured reserve after reaching an injury settlement.

=== Baltimore Ravens ===
On December 27, 2016, Vaughan was signed to the Ravens' practice squad. He signed a reserve/future contract with the Ravens on January 2, 2017. On August 14, 2017, the Ravens waived Vaughn.

=== San Antonio Commanders ===
On September 5, 2018, Vaughn signed with the San Antonio Commanders of the Alliance of American Football. On November 27, he was selected third-overall by the team in the inaugural AAF Draft. He was a backup behind Logan Woodside until the league folded in April 2019.

== Post-career ==
Vaughan held several management positions during and after his football career. Between 2018 and 2019, Vaughan was president of a seasonal and supplemental quarterback training program called QB Country. He briefly held management positions in other businesses before joining the Dallas-based industrial equipment supplier Darr Equipment Co in 2020.
