= 2013 NCAA Division II football rankings =

The 2013 NCAA Division II football rankings are from the American Football Coaches Association (AFCA). This is for the 2013 season.

== Legend ==
| | Increase in ranking |
| | Decrease in ranking |
| | Not ranked previous week |
| (#–#) | Win–loss record |
| (Italics) | Number of first place votes |
| т | Tied with team above or below also with this symbol |

== American Football Coaches Association poll ==
| | Preseason | Week 1 Sept 10 | Week 2 Sept 17 | Week 3 Sept 24 | Week 4 Oct 1 | Week 5 Oct 8 | Week 6 Oct 15 | Week 7 Oct 22 | Week 8 Oct 29 | Week 9 Nov 5 | Week 10 Nov 12 | Week 11 Nov 19 | Week 12 Postseason | |
|---|---|---|---|---|---|---|---|---|---|---|---|---|---|---|
| 1. | Valdosta State (26) | Valdosta State (1–0) (29) | Valdosta State (1–0) (28) | Valdosta State (2–0) (29) | Valdosta State (3–0) (30) | Valdosta State (4–0) (28) | Minnesota State (6–0) (26) | Minnesota State (7–0) (25) | Minnesota State (8–0) (25) | Minnesota State (9–0) (22) | Minnesota State (10–0) (21) | Minnesota State (11–0) (21) | Northwest Missouri State (15–0) (32) | 1. |
| 2. | Minnesota State (3) (Note: In the actual printed polls, Minnesota State was listed as Minnesota State–Mankato) | Minnesota State (1–0) (2) | Minnesota State (2–0) (3) | Minnesota State (3–0) (2) | Minnesota State (4–0) (2) | Minnesota State (5–0) (2) | Northwest Missouri State (6–0) (4) | Northwest Missouri State (7–0) (7) | Northwest Missouri State (8–0) (7) | Northwest Missouri State (9–0) (9) | Northwest Missouri State (10–0) (10) | Northwest Missouri State (11–0) (10) | Lenoir–Rhyne (13–2) | 2. |
| 3. | West Texas A&M (1) | Northwest Missouri State (1–0) | Northwest Missouri State (2–0) | Northwest Missouri State (3–0) | Northwest Missouri State (4–0) | Northwest Missouri State (5–0) | CSU Pueblo (6–0) (1) | CSU Pueblo (7–0) | CSU Pueblo (8–0) | CSU Pueblo (9–0) (1) | CSU Pueblo (10–0) (1) | CSU Pueblo (11–0) (1) | Grand Valley State (12–3) | 3. |
| 4. | Northwest Missouri State (1) | West Texas A&M (1–0) | West Texas A&M (2–0) | West Texas A&M (3–0) | West Texas A&M (4–0) | West Texas A&M (5–0) (1) | Missouri Western State (6–0) (1) | Missouri Western State (7–0) | Henderson State (8–0) | Henderson State (9–0) | Henderson State (10–0) | Henderson State (11–0) | West Chester (13–2) | 4. |
| 5. | Winston–Salem State | CSU Pueblo (1–0) (1) | CSU Pueblo (2–0) (1) | CSU Pueblo (3–0) (1) | CSU Pueblo (4–0) | CSU Pueblo (5–0) (1) | Henderson State (6–0) | Henderson State (7–0) | Bloomsburg (8–0) | Minnesota–Duluth (8–1) | Minnesota–Duluth (9–1) | Minnesota–Duluth (10–1) | St. Cloud State (12–2) | 5. |
| 6. | Missouri Western State | Missouri Western State (1–0) | Missouri Western State (2–0) | Missouri Western State (3–0) | Missouri Western State (4–0) | Missouri Western State (5–0) | Bloomsburg (6–0) | Bloomsburg (7–0) | Minnesota–Duluth (7–1) | Pittsburg State (8–1) | Pittsburg State (9–1) | Shepherd (10–0) | Minnesota State (11–1) | 6. |
| 7. | Shippensburg | Minnesota–Duluth (1–0) | Minnesota–Duluth (2–0) | IUP (3–0) | IUP (4–0) | IUP (5–0) | Pittsburg State (6–0) | Minnesota–Duluth (6–1) | Pittsburg State (7–1) | Shepherd (8–0) | Shepherd (9–0) | Ohio Dominican (10–0) | CSU Pueblo (11–1) | 7. |
| 8. | CSU Pueblo | IUP (1–0) | IUP (2–0) | Henderson State (3–0) | Henderson State (4–0) | Henderson State (5–0) | West Alabama (5–1) | UNC Pembroke (6–0) | Washburn (8–0) | West Chester (9–0) | Ohio Dominican (9–0) | UNC Pembroke (9–1) | Minnesota–Duluth (11–2) | 8. |
| 9. | Ashland | Henderson State (1–0) | Henderson State (2–0) | Grand Valley State (3–0) | Bloomsburg (4–0) | Bloomsburg (5–0) | Minnesota–Duluth (5–1) | Shepherd (7–0) | Shepherd (7–0) | Ohio Dominican (8–0) | Winston–Salem State (9–1) | Winston–Salem State (9–1) | Shepherd (11–1) | 9. |
| 10. | IUP (Note: In the actual printed polls, IUP was listed as Indiana (PA)) | Grand Valley State (1–0) | Grand Valley State (2–0) | Carson–Newman (3–0) | Pittsburg State (4–0) | Pittsburg State (5–0) | UNC Pembroke (5–0) | Washburn (7–0) | West Chester (8–0) | Emporia State (8–0) | UNC Pembroke (8–1) | Indianapolis (10–1) | North Alabama (10–3) | 10. |
| 11. | Minnesota–Duluth | Carson–Newman (1–0) | Carson–Newman (2–0) | Bloomsburg (3–0) | Minnesota–Duluth (3–1) | Minnesota–Duluth (4–1) | Shepherd (6–0) | Valdosta State (5–1) | Ohio Dominican (7–0) | Winston–Salem State (8–1) | Indianapolis (9–1) | Bloomsburg (10–1) | West Texas A&M (11–3) | 11. |
| 12. | New Haven | West Alabama (1–0) | Indianapolis (2–0) | Pittsburg State (3–0) | Shepherd (4–0) | Shepherd (5–0) | Valdosta State (4–1) | Pittsburg State (6–1) | Missouri Western State (7–1) | Midwestern State (7–1) | Bloomsburg (9–1) | St. Cloud State (10–1) | Ohio Dominican (10–1) | 12. |
| 13. | Henderson State | Midwestern State (0–0) | Bloomsburg (2–0) | Minnesota–Duluth (2–1) | UNC Pembroke (4–0) | UNC Pembroke (4–0) | Washburn (6–0) | West Chester (7–0) | Winston–Salem State (7–1) | Indianapolis (8–1) | St. Cloud State (9–1) | Lenoir–Rhyne (10–1) | Henderson State (11–1) | 13. |
| 14. | Grand Valley State | Indianapolis (1–0) | Pittsburg State (2–0) | Shepherd (3–0) | West Alabama (3–1) | West Alabama (4–1) | Tarleton State (5–0) | Ohio Dominican (7–0) | Emporia State (7–0) | UNC Pembroke (7–1) | Lenoir–Rhyne (9–1) | Emporia State (9–1) | Winston–Salem State (10–2) | 14. |
| 15. | Midwestern State | Bloomsburg (1–0) | Shepherd (2–0) | West Alabama (2–1) | Washburn (4–0) | Washburn (5–0) | West Chester (6–0) | Winston–Salem State (6–1) | West Texas A&M (7–1) | Washburn (8–1) | Saginaw Valley State (9–1) | West Chester (10–1) | UNC Pembroke (9–2) | 15. |
| 16. | West Alabama | Pittsburg State (1–0) | West Alabama (1–1) | UNC Pembroke (3–0) | Winston–Salem State (3–1) | Winston–Salem State (4–1) | Winston–Salem State (5–1) | West Texas A&M (6–1) | Carson–Newman (7–1) | Bloomsburg (8–1) | Emporia State (8–1) | North Alabama (8–2) | Bloomsburg (10–2) | 16. |
| 17. | Carson–Newman | Shepherd (1–0) | Tuskegee (2–0) | Winston–Salem State (2–1) | West Chester (4–0) | West Chester (5–0) | West Texas A&M (5–1) | Emporia State (7–0) | Midwestern State (6–1) | St. Cloud State (8–1) | West Chester (9–1) | Pittsburg State (9–2) | Carson–Newman (10–3) | 17. |
| 18. | Bloomsburg | Chadron State (1–0) | UNC Pembroke (2–0) | Washburn (3–0) | St. Cloud State (4–0) | Carson–Newman (4–1) | Ohio Dominican (6–0) | Carson–Newman (6–1) т | Indianapolis (7–1) | Lenoir–Rhyne (8–1) | Slippery Rock (9–1) | Carson–Newman (9–2) | Indianapolis (10–2) | 18. |
| 19. | Indianapolis | Tuskegee (1–0) | Winston–Salem State (1–1) | West Chester (3–0) | Chadron State (3–1) | Chadron State (4–1) | Carson–Newman (5–1) | Midwestern State (5–1) т | UNC Pembroke (6–1) | Saginaw Valley State (8–1) | Missouri Western State (8–2) | West Texas A&M (9–2) | Pittsburg State (10–2) | 19. |
| 20. | Chadron State | Winston–Salem State (0–1) | West Chester (2–0) | St. Cloud State (3–0) | Carson–Newman (3–1) | Ohio Dominican (5–0) | Emporia State (6–0) | Indianapolis (6–1) | West Alabama (6–2) | Slippery Rock (8–1) | North Alabama (7–2) | Slippery Rock (9–2) | Emporia State (9–2) | 20. |
| 21. | Pittsburg State | Ashland (0–1) | Chadron State (1–1) | Chadron State (2–1) | Indianapolis (3–1) | Indianapolis (4–1) | Indianapolis (5–1) | West Alabama (5–2) | St. Cloud State (7–1) | Newberry (8–1) | Carson–Newman (8–2) | Saginaw Valley State (9–2) | Slippery Rock (9–3) | 21. |
| 22. | Saginaw Valley State | North Alabama (1–0) | Washburn (2–0) | Indianapolis (2–1) | Tarleton State (3–0) | Tarleton State (4–0) | IUP (5–1) | St. Cloud State (6–1) | Lenoir–Rhyne (7–1) | Missouri Western State (7–2) | Virginia State (9–1) | Grand Valley State (9–2) | Saginaw Valley State (9–3) | 22. |
| 23. | Lenoir–Rhyne | UNC Pembroke (1–0) т | St. Cloud State (2–0) | Midwestern State (1–1) | Ohio Dominican (4–0) | Emporia State (5–0) | Newberry (6–0) | Tarleton State (5–1) | Saginaw Valley State (7–1) | Tuskegee (8–1) | Washburn (8–2) | IUP (9–2) | Newberry (9–3) | 23. |
| 24. | Tuskegee | West Chester (1–0) т | North Alabama (1–1) | Emporia State (3–0) | Emporia State (4–0) | Grand Valley State (4–1) | Midwestern State (4–1) | Lenoir–Rhyne (6–1) | Slippery Rock (7–1) | North Alabama (6–2) | Midwestern State (7–2) | Virginia State (9–1) | IUP (9–2) | 24. |
| 25. | Shepherd | Delta State (1–0) | Midwestern State (0–1) | Tarleton State (2–0) | Grand Valley State (3–1) | Midwestern State (3–1) | St. Cloud State (5–1) | Saginaw Valley State (6–1) | Newberry (7–1) | Carson–Newman (7–2) т | West Texas A&M (8–2) | Newberry (9–2) | Tuskegee (8–3) | 25. |
| 26. | | | | | | | | | | Virginia State (8–1) т | | | | 26. |
| | Preseason | Week 1 Sept 10 | Week 2 Sept 17 | Week 3 Sept 24 | Week 4 Oct 1 | Week 5 Oct 8 | Week 6 Oct 15 | Week 7 Oct 22 | Week 8 Oct 29 | Week 9 Nov 5 | Week 10 Nov 12 | Week 11 Nov 19 | Week 12 Postseason | |
| | | Dropped: 7 Shippensburg; 12 New Haven; 22 Saginaw Valley State; 23 Lenoir–Rhyne | Dropped: 21 Ashland; 25 Delta State | Dropped: 17 Tuskegee; 24 North Alabama | Dropped: 23 Midwestern State | Dropped: 18 St. Cloud State | Dropped: 19 Chadron State; 24 Grand Valley State | Dropped: 22 IUP; 23 Newberry | Dropped: 11 Valdosta State; 23 Tarleton State | Dropped: 15 West Texas A&M; 20 West Alabama | Dropped: 21 Newberry; 23 Tuskegee | Dropped: 19 Missouri Western State; 23 Washburn; 24 Midwestern State | Dropped: 24 Virginia State | |
