= List of Mountain East Conference football standings =

This is a list of yearly Mountain East Conference football standings.

== Mid-America standings ==
2013 Mountain East Conference football standings
	Conf.			Overall
Team	W		L	W		L
No. 9 Shepherd $^	9	–	0	11	–	1
Concord	7	–	2	8	–	3
Urbana	7	–	2	7	–	4
Charleston (WV)	6	–	3	6	–	5
Glenville State	5	–	4	6	–	5
West Virginia Wesleyan	5	–	4	5	–	5
Notre Dame (OH)	4	–	5	5	–	6
West Liberty	3	–	6	3	–	8
Fairmont State	2	–	7	3	–	7
Virginia–Wise #	2	–	7	2	–	9
West Virginia State	0	–	10	0	–	11
$ – Conference champion; ^ – NCAA Division II playoff participant; # – Provisional NCAA Division II member; Rankings from AFCA poll

2014 Mountain East Conference football standings
	Conf.			Overall
Team	W		L	W		L
No. 5 Concord $^	10	–	0	13	–	1
Shepherd	8	–	2	8	–	2
Charleston (WV)	7	–	3	8	–	3
Notre Dame (OH)	7	–	3	7	–	4
West Liberty	6	–	4	6	–	5
Glenville State	5	–	5	5	–	6
West Virginia Wesleyan	4	–	6	4	–	6
Fairmont State	3	–	7	3	–	7
Urbana	2	–	8	3	–	8
Virginia–Wise #	2	–	8	2	–	9
West Virginia State	1	–	9	2	–	9
$ – Conference champion; ^ – NCAA Division II playoff participant; # – Provisional NCAA Division II member; Rankings from AFCA poll

2015 Mountain East Conference football standings
	Conf.			Overall
Team	W		L	W		L
No. 2 Shepherd $^	10	–	0	13	–	1
No. 20 Charleston (WV) ^	9	–	1	10	–	2
Glenville State	6	–	4	7	–	4
Fairmont State	6	–	4	6	–	4
Concord	5	–	5	5	–	5
Notre Dame (OH)	5	–	5	5	–	6
West Liberty	5	–	5	5	–	6
West Virginia State	5	–	5	5	–	6
West Virginia Wesleyan	2	–	8	2	–	8
Urbana	1	–	9	2	–	9
Virginia–Wise	1	–	9	1	–	10
$ – Conference champion; ^ – NCAA Division II playoff participant; Rankings from AFCA poll

2016 Mountain East Conference football standings
	Conf.			Overall
Team	W		L	W		L
No. 3 Shepherd $^	10	–	0	13	–	1
No. 23 Fairmont State ^	9	–	1	10	–	2
Notre Dame (OH)	8	–	2	9	–	2
Virginia–Wise	5	–	5	6	–	5
Glenville State	5	–	5	5	–	6
West Liberty	4	–	6	4	–	7
West Virginia Wesleyan	4	–	6	4	–	7
Charleston (WV)	3	–	7	3	–	8
West Virginia State	3	–	7	3	–	8
Urbana	2	–	8	3	–	8
Concord	2	–	8	2	–	9
$ – Conference champion; ^ – NCAA Division II playoff participant; Rankings from AFCA poll
