= Matt Mitchell =

Matt Mitchell may refer to:

== Sports ==
- Matt Mitchell (American football), American football coach and former player
- Matt Mitchell (basketball) (born 1999), American basketball player
- Matthew Mitchell (basketball) (born 1970), American basketball coach
- Matt Mitchell (tennis) (born 1957), American tennis player

== Others ==
- Matt Mitchell (pianist) (born 1975), American jazz pianist and composer
- Matthew Mitchell (artist), American artist
