= 2015 West Texas A&M Buffaloes football team =

American college football season

2015 West Texas A&M Buffaloes football
- Conference: Lone Star Conference
- Record: 6–4 (3–3 LSC)
- Head coach: Mike Nesbitt (3rd season)
- Offensive scheme: Air raid
- Defensive coordinator: Nick Paremski (3rd season)
- Base defense: 3–4
- Home stadium: Kimbrough Memorial Stadium

2015 Lone Star Conference football standings
	Conf.			Overall
Team	W		L	W		L
No. 23 Texas A&M–Commerce $^	6	–	0	8	–	4
No. 9 Midwestern State ^	5	–	1	10	–	2
Angelo State	3	–	3	7	–	4
West Texas A&M	3	–	3	6	–	4
Eastern New Mexico #	3	–	3	6	–	6
Tarleton State	1	–	5	3	–	7
Texas A&M–Kingsville	0	–	6	2	–	9
$ – Conference champion; ^ – NCAA Division II playoff participant; # – C.H.A.M.P.S. Heart of Texas Bowl participant; Rankings from AFCA poll

The 2015 West Texas A&M Buffaloes football team represented West Texas A&M University during the 2015 NCAA Division II football season as a member of the Lone Star Conference (LSC). The Buffaloes were led by third-year head coach Mike Nesbitt. The team played its home games at Kimbrough Memorial Stadium in Canyon, Texas.

== Preseason ==
=== LSC media poll ===
The Buffaloes were predicted to finish fifth in the LSC, the first time in a decade the team was not predicted to finish in the top four.

== Schedule ==
Date	Time	Opponent	Site	Result	Attendance
September 3	7:00 p.m.	No. 19 Azusa Pacific*	Kimbrough Memorial Stadium; Canyon, TX	L 24–27	6,250
September 12	5:00 p.m.	No. 2 CSU Pueblo*	Kimbrough Memorial Stadium; Canyon, TX	W 31–30	7,975
September 19	3:30 p.m.	vs. Tarleton State	AT&T Stadium; Arlington, TX (LSC Football Festival)	W 52–38	11,094
September 26	5:00 p.m.	No. 6 Angelo State^{†}	Kimbrough Memorial Stadium; Canyon, TX	L 17–35	13,798
October 10	7:00 p.m.	at No. 12 Midwestern State	Memorial Stadium; Wichita Falls, TX	L 17–24	8,611
October 17	5:00 p.m.	No. 14 Texas A&M–Commerce	Kimbrough Memorial Stadium; Canyon, TX (East Texas vs. West Texas)	L 20–38	5,472
October 24	7:00 p.m.	at Texas A&M–Kingsville	Javelina Stadium; Kingsville, TX	W 24–14	3,000
October 31	12:00 p.m.	Eastern New Mexico	Canyon, TX; Kimbrough Memorial Stadium (Wagon Wheel)	W 52–42	5,857
November 7	2:00 p.m.	at Oklahoma Panhandle State*	Carl Wooten Field; Goodwell, OK (LSC Playoffs)	W 28–21	700
November 14	1:00 p.m.	Texas A&M–Kingsville*	Kimbrough Memorial Stadium; Canyon, TX (LSC Playoffs)	W 51–45	1,178
*Non-conference game; ^{†}Homecoming; Rankings from AFCA Poll released prior to the game; All times are in Central time

== Game summaries ==
=== No. 19 Azusa Pacific ===
No. 19 Azusa Pacific Cougars at West Texas A&M Buffaloes – Game summary

Quarter	1	2	3	4	Total
No. 19 Cougars	0	10	3	14	27
Buffaloes	14	7	3	0	24

at Kimbrough Memorial Stadium, Canyon, Texas

- Date: September 3
- Game time: 7:00 p.m. CDT
- Game weather: Partly cloudy, 91 °F (33 °C)
- Game attendance: 6,250
- Referee: Andy Dunklin
- Box score, Recap

Game information
First quarter
- WT – Jarrion Rhone 14-yard pass from Preston Rabb (Conner Hollabaugh kick), 8:18. Buffaloes 7–0. Drive: 11 plays, 74 yards, 2:50.
- WT – Geremy Alridge-Mitchell 60-yard run (Conner Hollabaugh kick), 3:53. Buffaloes 14–0. Drive: 6 plays, 82 yards, 2:11.

Second quarter

- WT – Geremy Alridge-Mitchell 2-yard run (Conner Hollabaugh kick), 10:08. Buffaloes 21–0. Drive: 8 plays, 60 yards, 2:27.
- APU – Ryan Adams 1-yard run (Jacob Hall kick), 5:43. Buffaloes 21–7. Drive: 4 plays, 63 yards, 1:44.
- APU – Jacob Hall 35-yard field goal, 0:28. Buffaloes 21–10. Drive: 8 plays, 42 yards, 3:03.

Third quarter

- WT – Conner Hollabaugh 38-yard field goal, 7:51. Buffaloes 24–10. Drive: 8 plays, 33 yards, 2:01.
- APU – Jacob Hall 21-yard field goal, 0:53. Buffaloes 24–13. Drive: 13 plays, 71 yards, 6:58.

Fourth quarter

- APU – Kurt Scoby 25-yard pass from Chad Jeffries (Jacob Hall kick), 12:42. Buffaloes 24–20. Drive: 6 plays, 82 yards, 2:18.
- APU – Josiah Thropay 27-yard pass from Chad Jeffries (Jacob Hall kick), 5:43. Cougars 27–24. Drive: 10 plays, 78 yards, 5:21.

Statistics	APU	WT
First downs	28	20
Total yards	409	393
Rushing yards	140	262
Passing yards	269	131
Turnovers	2	1
Time of possession	36:41	23:19

Team	Category	Player	Statistics
Azusa Pacific	Passing	Chad Jeffries	17/32, 269 yards, 2 TD, 2 INT
Azusa Pacific	Rushing	Kurt Scoby	21 rushes, 80 yards
Azusa Pacific	Receiving	Josiah Thropay	2 receptions, 58 yards, TD
West Texas A&M	Passing	Preston Rabb	25/44, 131 yards, TD, INT
West Texas A&M	Rushing	Geremy Alridge-Mitchell	17 rushes, 117 yards, 2 TD
West Texas A&M	Receiving	Jarrian Rhode	7 receptions, 83 yards, TD

=== No. 2 CSU Pueblo ===
No. 2 CSU Pueblo ThunderWolves at West Texas A&M Buffaloes – Game summary

Quarter	1	2	3	4	Total
No. 2 ThunderWolves	7	10	7	6	30
Buffaloes	14	0	7	10	31

at Kimbrough Memorial Stadium, Canyon, Texas

- Date: September 12
- Game time: 5:00 p.m. CDT
- Game weather: Overcast, 73 °F (23 °C)
- Game attendance: 7,975
- Referee: Kenny Kelarek
- Box score, Recap

Game information
First quarter
- WT – Geremy Alridge-Mitchell 4-yard run (Conner Hollabaugh kick), 10:57. Buffaloes 7–0. Drive: 6 plays, 37 yards, 1:52.
- CSUP – Cameron McDondle 80-yard run (Greg O'Donnell kick), 4:07. Tied 7–7. Drive: 1 play, 80 yards, 0:14.
- WT – Geremy Alridge-Mitchell 6-yard pass from Ethan Brinkley (Conner Hollabaugh kick), 0:37. Buffaloes 14–7. Drive: 10 plays, 81 yards, 3:26.

Second quarter

- CSUP – LaRon Tarkington 25-yard interception return (Greg O'Donnell kick), 1:23. Tied 14–14.
- CSUP – Greg O'Donnell 45-yard field goal, 0:02. ThunderWolves 17–14. Drive: 4 plays, 35 yards, 0:24.

Third quarter

- CSUP – Sam Singleton 10-yard interception return (Greg O'Donnell kick), 10:39. ThunderWolves 24–14.
- WT – Geremy Alridge-Mitchell 36-yard run (Conner Hollabaugh kick), 8:20. ThunderWolves 24–21. Drive: 7 plays, 75 yards, 2:19.

Fourth quarter

- WT – Conner Hollabaugh 31-yard field goal, 13:40. Tied 24–24. Drive: 4 plays, 0 yards, 0:20.
- WT – Geremy Alridge-Mitchell 4-yard run (Conner Hollabaugh kick), 2:13. Buffaloes 31–24. Drive: 5 plays, 22 yards, 2:27.
- CSUP – Kieren Duncan 98-yard kickoff return (pass failed), 1:57. Buffaloes 31–30.

Statistics	CSUP	WT
First downs	13	18
Total yards	271	341
Rushing yards	173	98
Passing yards	98	243
Turnovers	6	2
Time of possession	25:12	34:48

Team	Category	Player	Statistics
CSU Pueblo	Passing	Malcolm Ruben	11/24, 92 yards, 3 INT
CSU Pueblo	Rushing	Cameron McDondle	23 rushes, 166 yards, TD
CSU Pueblo	Receiving	Zach Boyd	2 receptions, 35 yards
West Texas A&M	Passing	Ethan Brinkley	28/43, 207 yards, TD, 2 INT
West Texas A&M	Rushing	Geremy Alridge-Mitchell	30 rushes, 105 yards, 3 TD
West Texas A&M	Receiving	Jarrian Rhone	12 receptions, 71 yards

Starting quarterback Preston Rabb exited the game in the first quarter with an ankle injury.

=== Vs. Tarleton State (LSC Football Festival) ===
West Texas A&M Buffaloes vs. Tarleton State Texans (LSC Football Festival) – Game summary

Quarter	1	2	3	4	Total
Buffaloes	0	28	10	14	52
Texans	7	10	21	0	38

at AT&T Stadium, Arlington, Texas

- Date: September 19
- Game time: 3:30 p.m. CDT
- Game weather: None (retractable roof closed)
- Game attendance: 11,094
- Referee: Dwayne McKee
- Box score, Recap

Game information
First quarter
- TSU – Cooper Cole 8-yard pass from Zach Woerner (Blake Barnes kick), 4:29. Texans 7–0. Drive: 8 plays, 75 yards, 3:35.

Second quarter

- TSU – Jabari Anderson 8-yard run (Blake Barnes kick), 14:05. Texans 14–0. Drive: 8 plays, 58 yards, 3:37.
- WT – Geremy Alridge-Mitchell 55-yard run (Conner Hollabaugh kick), 13:04. Texans 14–7. Drive: 3 plays, 73 yards, 0:56.
- WT – Geremy Alridge-Mitchell 29-yard run (Conner Hollabaugh kick), 11:09. Tied 14–14. Drive: 2 plays, 34 yards, 0:40.
- TSU – Blake Barnes 22-yard field goal, 6:33. Texans 17–14. Drive: 13 plays, 67 yards, 4:29.
- WT – Davontae Merriweather 43-yard interception return (Conner Hollabaugh kick), 4:22. Buffaloes 21–17.
- WT – Geremy Alridge-Mitchell 29-yard run (Conner Hollabaugh kick), 2:50. Buffaloes 28–17. Drive: 3 plays, 21 yards, 1:06.

Third quarter

- TSU – Chase Varnado 48-yard fumble return (Blake Barnes kick), 12:27. Buffaloes 28–24.
- WT – Conner Hollabaugh 52-yard field goal, 8:32. Buffaloes 31–24. Drive: 10 plays, 40 yards, 3:55.
- TSU – Jabari Anderson 7-yard run (Blake Barnes kick), 5:40. Tied 31–31. Drive: 9 plays, 75 yards, 2:52.
- WT – Word Hudson 73-yard pass from Ethan Brinkley (Conner Hollabaugh kick), 4:49. Buffaloes 38–31. Drive: 2 plays, 77 yards, 0:45.
- TSU – Zach Henshaw 1-yard (Blake Barnes kick), 0:41. Tied 38–38. Drive: 10 plays, 78 yards, 3:58.

Fourth quarter

- WT – Xavier Amey 53-yard pass from Ethan Brinkley (Conner Hollabaugh kick), 14:15. Buffaloes 45–38. Drive: 4 plays, 70 yards, 1:26.
- WT – Dimitri Donald 24-yard pass from Ethan Brinkley (Conner Hollabaugh kick), 10:23. Buffaloes 52–38. Drive: 7 plays, 47 yards, 3:02.

Statistics	WT	TSU
First downs	21	31
Total yards	501	499
Rushing yards	245	172
Passing yards	256	327
Turnovers	1	3
Time of possession	28:06	31:54

Team	Category	Player	Statistics
West Texas A&M	Passing	Ethan Brinkley	15/22, 256 yards, 3 TD
West Texas A&M	Rushing	Geremy Alridge-Mitchell	31 rushes, 236 yards, 3 TD
West Texas A&M	Receiving	Word Hudson	5 receptions, 129 yards, TD
Tarleton State	Passing	Zed Woerner	36/57, 327 yards, TD, 2 INT
Tarleton State	Rushing	Daniel McCants	8 rushes, 91 yards
Tarleton State	Receiving	Cooper Cole	7 receptions, 83 yards, TD

=== No. 6 Angelo State ===
No. 6 Angelo State Rams at West Texas A&M Buffaloes – Game summary

Quarter	1	2	3	4	Total
No. 6 Rams	14	14	0	7	35
Buffaloes	14	3	0	0	17

at Kimbrough Memorial Stadium, Canyon, Texas

- Date: September 26
- Game time: 5:00 p.m. CDT
- Game weather: Mostly sunny, 80 °F (27 °C)
- Game attendance: 13,798
- Referee: Vidal Jones
- Box score, Recap

Statistics	ASU	WT
First downs	32	13
Total yards	607	302
Rushing yards	231	91
Passing yards	376	211
Turnovers	1	2
Time of possession	33:11	26:49

Team	Category	Player	Statistics
Angelo State	Passing	Kyle Washington	34/49, 376 yards
Angelo State	Rushing	Kyle Washington	12 rushes, 124 yards, 2 TD
Angelo State	Receiving	Donovan Thompson	12 receptions, 143 yards
West Texas A&M	Passing	Ethan Brinkley	25/36, 211 yards, TD, INT
West Texas A&M	Rushing	Geremy Alridge-Mitchell	13 rushes, 99 yards
West Texas A&M	Receiving	Xavier Amey	5 receptions, 101 yards, TD

=== At No. 12 Midwestern State ===
West Texas A&M Buffaloes at No. 12 Midwestern State Mustangs – Game summary

Quarter	1	2	3	4	Total
Buffaloes	3	0	7	7	17
No. 12 Mustangs	7	7	3	7	24

at Memorial Stadium, Wichita Falls, Texas

- Date: October 10
- Game time: 7:00 p.m. CDT
- Game weather: Sunny, 82 °F (28 °C)
- Game attendance: 5,472
- Referee: Kenny Kelarek
- Box score, Recap

Game information
First quarter
- MSU – Vincent Johnson 9-yard run (Andy Alkhazshvilly kick), 12:08. Mustangs 7–0. Drive: 3 plays, 49 yards, 0:52.
- WT – Conner Hollabaugh 46-yard field goal, 8:02. Mustangs 7–3. Drive: 11 plays, 46 yards, 4:06.

Second quarter

- MSU – Don Jerry 6-yard run (Andy Alkhazshvilly kick), 1:31. Mustangs 14–3. Drive: 1 play, 6 yards, 0:06.

Third quarter

- WT – Will Toliver 31-yard interception return (Conner Hollabaugh kick), 13:56. Mustangs 14–10.
- MSU – Andy Alkhazshvilly 20-yard field goal, 6:39. Mustangs 17–10. Drive: 15 plays, 72 yards, 7:17.

Fourth quarter

- MSU – Vincent Johnson 84-yard run (Andy Alkhazshvilly kick), 9:21. Mustangs 24–10. Drive: 1 play, 84 yards, 0:14.
- WT – Geremy Alridge-Mitchell 3-yard run (Conner Hollabaugh kick), 1:30. Mustangs 24–17. Drive: 10 plays, 84 yards, 3:31.

Statistics	WT	MSU
First downs	18	19
Total yards	378	453
Rushing yards	202	271
Passing yards	176	182
Turnovers	3	2
Time of possession	32:56	27:04

Team	Category	Player	Statistics
West Texas A&M	Passing	Ethan Brinkley	19/27, 176 yards, INT
West Texas A&M	Rushing	Geremy Alridge-Mitchell	40 rushes, 189 yards, TD
West Texas A&M	Receiving	Xavier Amey	3 receptions, 68 yards
Midwestern State	Passing	Quade Coward	13/22, 182 yards, INT
Midwestern State	Rushing	Vincent Johnson	17 rushes, 190 yards, 2 TD
Midwestern State	Receiving	Statron Jones	3 receptions, 56 yards

=== No. 14 Texas A&M–Commerce ===
No. 14 Texas A&M–Commerce Lions at West Texas A&M Buffaloes – Game summary

Quarter	1	2	3	4	Total
No. 14 Lions	0	21	3	14	38
Buffaloes	7	3	3	7	20

at Kimbrough Memorial Stadium, Canyon, Texas

- Date: October 17
- Game time: 5:00 p.m. CDT
- Game weather: Sunny, 65 °F (18 °C)
- Game attendance: 5,472
- Referee: Andy Dunklin
- Box score, Recap

Statistics	TAMUC	WT
First downs	22	18
Total yards	491	314
Rushing yards	223	48
Passing yards	268	266
Turnovers	1	3
Time of possession	30:56	29:04

Team	Category	Player	Statistics
Texas A&M–Commerce	Passing	Harrison Stewart	14/22, 253 yards, TD
Texas A&M–Commerce	Rushing	Theo Wofford	22 rushes, 125 yards, TD
Texas A&M–Commerce	Receiving	Darby Smith	3 receptions, 91 yards, TD
West Texas A&M	Passing	Ethan Brinkley	26/41, 266 yards, TD, 2 INT
West Texas A&M	Rushing	Devon Paye	14 rushes, 46 yards, TD
West Texas A&M	Receiving	Xavier Amey	6 receptions, 93 yards

=== At Texas A&M–Kingsville ===
West Texas A&M Buffaloes at Texas A&M–Kingsville Javelinas – Game summary

Quarter	1	2	3	4	Total
Buffaloes	14	0	7	3	24
Javelinas	7	7	0	0	14

at Javelina Stadium, Kingsville, Texas

- Date: October 24
- Game time: 7:00 p.m. CDT
- Game weather: Rainy
- Game attendance: 3,000
- Referee: Jarvis Walker
- Box score, Recap

Game information
First quarter
- WT – John Sheehy 65-yard interception return (Conner Hollabaugh kick), 9:46. Buffaloes 7–0.
- TAMUK – Trey Mitchell 3-yard run (Julio de la Garza kick), 6:06. Tied 7–7. Drive: 10 plays, 75 yards, 3:40.
- WT – Geremy Alridge-Mitchell 5-yard run (Conner Hollabaugh kick), 1:23. Buffaloes 14–7. Drive: 14 plays, 80 yards, 4:41.

Second quarter

- TAMUK – Chris Cooper 4-yard pass from Stevie Joe Dorman (Julio de la Garza kick), 14:29. Tied 14–14. Drive: 3 plays, 40 yards, 0:41.

Third quarter

- WT – Jarrian Rhone 3-yard pass from Ethan Brinkley (Conner Hollabaugh kick), 2:35. Buffaloes 21–14. Drive: 15 plays, 83 yards, 7:00.

Fourth quarter

- WT – Conner Hollabaugh 36-yard field goal, 2:35. Buffaloes 24–14. Drive: 8 plays, 28 yards, 3:21.

Statistics	WT	TAMUK
First downs	25	11
Total yards	378	193
Rushing yards	257	136
Passing yards	121	57
Turnovers	1	5
Time of possession	41:20	18:40

Team	Category	Player	Statistics
West Texas A&M	Passing	Ethan Brinkley	12/21, 121 yards, TD
West Texas A&M	Rushing	Geremy Alrdige-Mitchell	45 rushes, 149 yards, TD
West Texas A&M	Receiving	Jarrian Rhone	5 receptions, 49 yards, TD
Texas A&M–Kingsville	Passing	Stevie Joe Dorman	6/16, 33 yards, TD, 2 INT
Texas A&M–Kingsville	Rushing	Shawn Vasquez	11 rushes, 91 yards
Texas A&M–Kingsville	Receiving	Jordan Thomas	2 receptions, 17 yards

=== Eastern New Mexico ===
Eastern New Mexico Greyhounds at West Texas A&M Buffaloes – Game summary

Quarter	1	2	3	4	Total
Greyhounds	14	14	7	7	42
Buffaloes	21	14	3	14	52

at Kimbrough Memorial Stadium, Canyon, Texas

- Date: October 31
- Game time: 12:00 p.m. CDT
- Game weather: Clear and breezy, 44 °F (7 °C)
- Game attendance: 5,857
- Referee: C. Watson
- Box score, Recap

Statistics	ENMU	WT
First downs	18	17
Total yards	462	528
Rushing yards	324	141
Passing yards	138	387
Turnovers	4	1
Time of possession	32:09	27:51

Team	Category	Player	Statistics
Eastern New Mexico	Passing	Jeremy Buurma	8/14, 138 yards, TD, INT
Eastern New Mexico	Rushing	Kamal Cass	23 rushes, 184 yards, 3 TD
Eastern New Mexico	Receiving	Aaron Johnson	4 receptions, 93 yards, TD
West Texas A&M	Passing	Ethan Brinkley	18/25, 387 yards, 3 TD
West Texas A&M	Rushing	Geremy Alridge-Mitchell	22 rushes, 80 yards, 2 TD
West Texas A&M	Receiving	Xavier Amey	7 receptions, 242 yards, 2 TD

=== At Oklahoma Panhandle State (LSC Playoffs) ===
West Texas A&M Buffaloes at Oklahoma Panhandle State Aggies (LSC Playoffs) – Game summary

Quarter	1	2	3	4	Total
Buffaloes	0	7	14	7	28
Aggies	0	0	7	14	21

at Carl Wooten Field, Goodwell, Oklahoma

- Date: November 7
- Game time: 2:00 p.m. CDT
- Game weather: Mostly sunny, 52 °F (11 °C)
- Game attendance: 700
- Referee: Dustin Rudolph
- Box score, Recap

Game information
First quarter
- No scoring plays

Second quarter

- WT – Geremy Alridge-Mitchell 12-yard run (Conner Hollabaugh kick), 7:14. Buffaloes 7–0. Drive: 11 plays, 81 yards, 5:10.

Third quarter

- WT – Xavier Amey 18-yard pass from Ethan Brinkley (Conner Hollabaugh kick), 5:34. Buffaloes 14–0. Drive: 8 plays, 49 yards, 3:24.
- OPSU – Chris McClendon 31-yard run (Nick Clarkson kick), 5:34. Buffaloes 14–7. Drive: 6 plays, 78 yards, 3:36.
- WT – Devon Paye 22-yard pass from Ethan Brinkley (Conner Hollabaugh kick), 2:57. Buffaloes 21–7. Drive: 6 plays, 75 yards, 2:36.

Fourth quarter

- OPSU – J. B. Frontz 1-yard pass from Shane Truelove (Nick Clarkson kick), 9:51. Buffaloes 21–14. Drive: 12 plays, 88 yards, 5:55.
- OPSU – Xazier Murry 40-yard interception return (Nick Clarkson kick), 8:23. Tied 21–21.
- WT – Devon Paye 19-yard run (Conner Hollabaugh kick), 4:34. Buffaloes 28–21. Drive: 9 plays, 65 yards, 3:42.

Statistics	WT	OPSU
First downs	22	19
Total yards	459	382
Rushing yards	174	243
Passing yards	285	139
Turnovers	1	2
Time of possession	30:18	29:42

Team	Category	Player	Statistics
West Texas A&M	Passing	Ethan Brinkley	22/34, 288 yards, 2 TD, INT
West Texas A&M	Rushing	Devon Paye	11 rushes, 85 yards, TD
West Texas A&M	Receiving	Xavier Amey	7 receptions, 91 yards, TD
Oklahoma Panhandle State	Passing	Shane Truelove	12/24, 123 yards, TD
Oklahoma Panhandle State	Rushing	Chris McClendon	20 rushes, 170 yards, TD
Oklahoma Panhandle State	Receiving	Chris McClendon	3 receptions, 52 yards

=== Texas A&M–Kingsville (LSC Playoffs) ===
Texas A&M–Kingsville Javelinas at West Texas A&M Buffaloes (LSC Playoffs) – Game summary

Quarter	1	2	3	4	Total
Javelinas	14	21	7	3	45
Buffaloes	21	17	7	6	51

at Kimbrough Memorial Stadium, Canyon, Texas

- Date: November 14
- Game time: 1:00 p.m. CST
- Game weather: Mostly sunny, 50 °F (10 °C)
- Game attendance: 1,178
- Referee: Dwayne McKee
- Box score, Recap

Statistics	TAMUK	WT
First downs	20	29
Total yards	546	518
Rushing yards	274	273
Passing yards	272	245
Turnovers	2	1
Time of possession	28:02	30:51

Team	Category	Player	Statistics
Texas A&M–Kingsville	Passing	Myles Carr	19/30, 272 yards, 4 TD
Texas A&M–Kingsville	Rushing	Greg Pitre	27 rushes, 226 yards
Texas A&M–Kingsville	Receiving	Anthony Autry	7 receptions, 145 yards
West Texas A&M	Passing	Ethan Brinkley	22/31, 245 yards, TD
West Texas A&M	Rushing	Geremy Alrdige-Mitchell	32 rushes, 213 yards, 3 TD
West Texas A&M	Receiving	Xavier Amey	5 receptions, 79 yards, TD
