= 2015 NCAA Division II Football Championship Game =

2015 NCAA Division II Football Championship
Northwest Missouri State Bearcats	Shepherd Rams
(14–0)	(13–0)
MIAA	MEC
34	7
Head coach: Adam Dorrel	Head coach: Monte Cater
Seed 1	Seed 1
	1	2	3	4	Total
Northwest Missouri State	7	17	3	7	34
Shepherd	0	0	7	0	7
- Date: December 19, 2015
- Season: 2015
- Stadium: Children's Mercy Park
- Location: Kansas City, Kansas
- Referee: Edwin Lee
- Attendance: 16,181

United States TV coverage
- Network: ESPN2

The 2015 NCAA Division II Football Championship Game was a postseason college football game that determined a national champion in NCAA Division II for the 2015 season. It was played at Children's Mercy Park in Kansas City, Kansas, on December 19, 2015, with kickoff at 3:00 p.m. EST (2:00 p.m. local CST), and television coverage on ESPN2.

== Teams ==
The participants of the 2015 NCAA Division II Football Championship Game were the finalists of the 2015 Division II Playoffs, which began with four 7-team brackets to determine super region champions, who then qualified for the national semifinals. The game featured the winners of those national semifinal games: No. 1 seed Shepherd and No. 1 seed Northwest Missouri State. This was the first meeting between the teams. This was the Bearcats' ninth championship game appearance, having won 4, while the Rams were making their first appearance.

=== National semifinals ===
Semifinals; December 12; Hosted by team with asterisk
1	Shepherd*	34
6	Grand Valley State	32
1	West Georgia	23
1	Northwest Missouri State*	38

National Championship; December 19; Children's Mercy Park, Kansas City, KS
1	Shepherd	7
1	Northwest Missouri State	34

== Game summary ==
2015 NCAA Division II Football Championship Game

Quarter	1	2	3	4	Total
No. 1 Northwest Missouri State	7	17	3	7	34
No. 1 Shepherd	0	0	7	0	7

at Children's Mercy Park • Kansas City, Kansas

- Date: Saturday, December 19, 2015
- Game time: 4:00 p.m. EST (3:00 p.m. CST)
- Game weather: Sunny • Temperature: 52 °F (11 °C) • Wind: 16 mph
- Game attendance: 16,181
- Referee: Edwin Lee
- TV: ESPN2

Game information

First Quarter

- (14:13) NWMS – Jordan Grove 1 yard rush, Simon Mathiesen kick (Drive: 2 plays, 5 yards, 0:33; Northwest Missouri State 7–0)

Second Quarter

- (6:44) NWMS – Brady Bolles 1 yard pass to Shane Williams, Simon Mathiesen kick (Drive: 4 plays, 80 yards, 1:52; Northwest Missouri State 14–0)
- (0:38) NWMS – Simon Mathiesen 30 yard field goal (Drive: 12 plays, 70 yards, 3:42; Northwest Missouri State 17–0)
- (0:20) NWMS – Bryce Enyard 59 yard interception return, Simon Mathiesen kick (Northwest Missouri State 24–0)

Third Quarter

- (9:49) SHEP – Jeff Ziemba 21 yard pass to Billy Brown, Ryan Earls kick (Drive: 2 plays, 32 yards, 0:36; Northwest Missouri State 24–7)
- (4:33) NWMS – Simon Mathiesen 22 yard field goal (Drive: 10 plays, 78 yards, 5:09; Northwest Missouri State 27–7)

Fourth Quarter

- (8:47) NWMS – Jordan Grove 1 yard rush, Simon Mathiesen kick (Drive: 10 plays, 54 yards, 4:45; Northwest Missouri State 34–7)

=== Statistics ===
Statistics	NWMS	SHEP
First downs	20	7
Plays–yards	70–462	44–97
Rushes–yards	42–184	28–(–39)
Passing yards	278	136
Passing: Comp–Att–Int	21–28–0	11–16–1
Time of possession	34:14	25:46

Team	Category	Player	Statistics
Northwest Missouri State	Passing	Brady Bolles	20/27, 223 yards, 1 TD
Northwest Missouri State	Rushing	Phil Jackson	21 carries, 109 yards
Northwest Missouri State	Receiving	Jordan Grove	5 receptions, 104 yards
Shepherd	Passing	Jeff Ziemba	11/16, 136 yards, 1 TD, 1 INT
Shepherd	Rushing	Allen Cross	11 carries, 27 yards
Shepherd	Receiving	Billy Brown	6 receptions, 95 yards, 1 TD
