= 2015 Texas A&M–Commerce Lions football team =

American college football season

2015 Texas A&M–Commerce Lions football

LSC champion

NCAA Division II First Round, L 30–48 at Ferris State
- Conference: Lone Star Conference
- Record: 8–4 (6–0 LSC)
- Head coach: Colby Carthel (3rd season)
- Offensive coordinator: Matt Storm (3rd season)
- Offensive scheme: Spread
- Defensive coordinator: Justin Deason (3rd season)
- Base defense: 3–4
- Home stadium: Memorial Stadium

2015 Lone Star Conference football standings
	Conf.			Overall
Team	W		L	W		L
No. 23 Texas A&M–Commerce $^	6	–	0	8	–	4
No. 9 Midwestern State ^	5	–	1	10	–	2
Angelo State	3	–	3	7	–	4
West Texas A&M	3	–	3	6	–	4
Eastern New Mexico #	3	–	3	6	–	6
Tarleton State	1	–	5	3	–	7
Texas A&M–Kingsville	0	–	6	2	–	9
$ – Conference champion; ^ – NCAA Division II playoff participant; # – C.H.A.M.P.S. Heart of Texas Bowl participant; Rankings from AFCA poll

The 2015 Texas A&M–Commerce Lions football team represented Texas A&M University–Commerce as a member of the Lone Star Conference (LSC) during the 2015 NCAA Division II football season. Led by third-year head coach Colby Carthel, the Lions compiled an overall record of 8–4 with a mark of 6–0 in conference play, winning the LSC title for the second consecutive season. Texas A&M–Commerce advanced to the NCAA Division II Football Championship playoffs for the first time since the 1995 season, losing in the first round to Ferris State. The Lions were ranked No. 23 in the final NCAA Division II poll. The team played their games at Memorial Stadium on the university's campus in Commerce, Texas.

== Schedule ==
Date	Time	Opponent	Rank	Site	Result	Attendance
September 3	7:00 p.m.	Adams State*	No. 22	Memorial Stadium; Commerce, TX	W 48–17	6,842
September 12	6:00 p.m.	No. 10 Delta State*	No. 18	Memorial Stadium; Commerce, TX	L 44–51	6,527
September 19	10:00 a.m.	Texas A&M–Kingsville	No. 22	Javelina Stadium; Kingsville, TX (Chennault Cup)	W 37-17	7,336
September 26	4:00 p.m.	at Eastern New Mexico	No. 20	Memorial Stadium; Commerce, TX	W 42-31	6,242
October 3	7:00 p.m.	Tarleton State	No. 18	Memorial Stadium; Stephenville, TX (President's Cup)	W 63–0	7,242
October 10	7:00 p.m.	No. 16 Angelo State	No. 15	Memorial Stadium; Commerce, TX	W 38–35	6,875
October 17	7:00 p.m.	at West Texas A&M	No. 14	Kimbrough Memorial Stadium; Canyon, TX (East Texas vs. West Texas)	W 38–20	5,472
October 24	4:00 p.m.	Midwestern State	No. 11	Memorial Stadium; Commerce, TX	W 27–14	3,227
October 31	6:00 p.m.	at No. 8 (FCS) Sam Houston State*	No. 8	Bowers Stadium; Huntsville, TX	L 24–38	4,862
November 7	2:00 p.m.	Angelo State*	No. 12	Memorial Stadium; Commerce, TX (Lone Star Conference Playoff)	W 36–35	5,217
November 14	4:00 p.m.	No. 10 Midwestern State*	No. 11	Memorial Stadium; Commerce, TX (Lone Star Conference Playoff Championship)	L 33–37	5,119
November 21	12:00 pm	at No. 2 Ferris State*	No. 20	Top Taggart Field; Big Rapids, MI (NCAA Division II First Round)	L 30–48	2,236
*Non-conference game; Rankings from AFCA Poll released prior to the game; All times are in Central time

== Postseason awards ==
=== All-Americans ===
- Elwood Clement, First Team Offensive Line
- Richard Cooper, First Team Running Back
- Darian Lindsey, First Team Safety
- DeMarlon Morris, First Team Defensive Back
- Shane Thompson, First Team Offensive Line
- Toni Pulu, Second Team Defensive Line
- Tyree Barton, Honorable Mention Defensive Line
- Cole Pitts, Honorable Mention Linebacker
- Harrison Stewart, Honorable Mention Quarterback
- Theo Wofford, Honorable Mention Running Back
- Charles Wood, Honorable Mention Linebacker

=== LSC Superlatives ===
- Offensive Back of the Year: Richard Cooper

=== LSC First Team ===
- Elwood Clement, Offensive Line
- Richard Cooper, Running Back
- Lance Evans, Receiver
- Darian Lindsey, Safety
- Cole Pitts, Linebacker
- Toni Pulu, Defensive Line
- Buck Wilson, Return Specialist

=== LSC Second Team ===
- Tyree Barton, Defensive Line
- DeMarlon Morris, Cornerback
- Jason Osei, Offensive Line
- Cameron Rogers, Deep Snapper
- Devarus Shores, Linebacker
- Darby Smith, Receiver
- Harrison Stewart, Quarterback
- Theo Wofford, Running Back
- Charles Woods, Linebacker

=== LSC Honorable Mention ===
- Keiston Carter, Defensive End
- Chris Chumley, Tight End
- Derrick Macon, Receiver
- Kristov Martinez, Kicker
- Kevin Mederias, Cornerback
- Avery Poates, Offensive Line
- Tre'Von Taylor, Linebacker
- Shane Thompson, Offensive Line
- Chase Thrasher, Punter
- Landon Watkins, Center
