= 2015 Northwest Missouri State Bearcats football team =

American college football season

2015 Northwest Missouri State Bearcats football

NCAA Division II champion MIAA champion

NCAA Division II Championship Game, W 34–7 vs. Shepherd
- Conference: Mid-America Intercollegiate Athletics Association

Ranking
- AFCA: No. 1
- Record: 15–0 (11–0 MIAA)
- Head coach: Adam Dorrel (5th season)
- Offensive coordinator: Charlie Flohr (4th season)
- Offensive scheme: Pro spread
- Defensive coordinator: Rich Wright (5th season)
- Base defense: 4–2–5
- Home stadium: Bearcat Stadium

2015 Mid-America Intercollegiate Athletics Association football standings
	Conf.			Overall
Team	W		L	W		L
No. 1 NW Missouri State $^	11	–	0	15	–	0
No. 8 Emporia State ^	9	–	2	11	–	3
Central Missouri	8	–	3	8	–	3
Fort Hays State #	8	–	3	8	–	4
Central Oklahoma #	6	–	5	7	–	5
Missouri Western	6	–	5	6	–	5
Pittsburg State	6	–	5	6	–	5
Washburn	5	–	6	5	–	6
Lindenwood	3	–	8	3	–	8
Northeastern State	3	–	8	3	–	8
Missouri Southern	1	–	10	1	–	10
Nebraska–Kearney	0	–	11	0	–	11
$ – Conference champion; ^ – NCAA Division II playoff participant; # – bowl participant (Fort Hays State: Mineral Water Bowl, Central Oklahoma: Live United Texarkana Bowl; Rankings from AFCA poll)

The 2015 Northwest Missouri State Bearcats football team represented Northwest Missouri State University as a member of the Mid-America Intercollegiate Athletics Association (MIAA) during the 2015 NCAA Division II football season. Led by fifth-year head coach Adam Dorrel, the team finished the regular season with an undefeated 11–0 record. They won their fifth NCAA Division II Football Championship with a win over Shepherd in the NCAA Division II Championship Game by a score of 34–7. The Bearcats played their home games at Bearcat Stadium in Maryville, Missouri, which has been the Bearcat's home stadium since 1917.

== Schedule ==
Date	Time	Opponent	Rank	Site	TV	Result	Attendance	Source
September 3	7:00 p.m.	at Nebraska–Kearney	No. 7	Ron & Carol Cope Stadium; Kearney, NE		W 31–0	7,853	
September 10	7:00 p.m.	Missouri Southern	No. 4	Bearcat Stadium; Maryville, MO		W 48–7	7,111	
September 19	1:30 p.m.	at Central Missouri	No. 3	Audrey J. Walton Stadium; Warrensburg, MO		W 49–14	9,973	
September 26	2:37 p.m.	Central Oklahoma	No. 3	Bearcat Stadium; Maryville, MO	MIAA	W 23–16	7,847	
October 3	1:00 p.m.	at Northeastern State	No. 3	Doc Wadley Stadium; Tahlequah, OK		W 59–7	1,593	
October 10	1:00 p.m.	Lindenwood	No. 3	Bearcat Stadium; Maryville, MO		W 69–0	6,954	
October 17	2:37 p.m.	at No. 22 Pittsburg State	No. 3	Carnie Smith Stadium; Pittsburg, KS (rivalry)	MIAA	W 31–14	10,189	
October 24	2:00 p.m.	Fort Hays State^{†}	No. 3	Bearcat Stadium; Maryville, MO		W 45–24	9,082	
October 31	1:00 p.m.	at Missouri Western	No. 2	Spratt Stadium; St. Joseph, MO (rivalry)		W 24–10	6,955	
November 7	6:00 p.m.	No. 14 Emporia State	No. 2	Bearcat Stadium; Maryville, MO	ASN	W 44–10	6,542	
November 14	1:00 p.m.	at Washburn	No. 1	Yager Stadium; Topeka, KS		W 49–13	5,403	
November 28	1:00 p.m.	No. 11 Humboldt State*	No. 1	Bearcat Stadium; Maryville, MO (NCAA Division II Second Round)		W 54–7	4,160	
December 5	1:00 p.m.	No. 18 Emporia State*	No. 1	Bearcat Stadium; Maryville, MO (NCAA Division II Quarterfinal)		W 38–17	5,155	
December 12	2:30 p.m.	No. 7 West Georgia*	No. 1	Bearcat Stadium; Maryville, MO (NCAA Division II Semifinal)	ESPN3	W 38–23	5,522	
December 19	3:00 p.m.	vs. No. 5 Shepherd*	No. 1	Sporting Park; Kansas City, KS (NCAA Division II Championship)	ESPN2	W 34–7	16,181	
*Non-conference game; ^{†}Homecoming; Rankings from American Football Coaches Association Poll released prior to the game; All times are in Central time

== Roster ==
2015 Northwest Missouri State Bearcats football team roster
Players
Coaches
Offense

Pos.	#	Name	Class
WR	1	Dre Washington	Jr
RB	7	Cameron Wilcox	So
WR	8	George Sehl	Jr
QB	10	Brady Bolles	Sr
WR	12	Randy Schmidt	So
WR	13	Shawn Bane Jr.	Fr
QB	15	Jonathan Baker	So
QB	16	Kyle Zimmerman	Jr
WR	17	Laderrick Smith	Fr
WR	18	Marquese Surrell	Fr
WR	19	Cody Massey	Fr
RB	20	Emanuel Jones	Fr
WR	21	Jordan Bishop	So
WR	22	Haden Bryant	Jr
RB	26	Chase White	Fr
RB	28	Phil Jackson II	Jr
RB	32	Jordan Grove	So
TE	48	Clayton Wilson	So
OL	53	Scott Gourley	So
OL	58	Chase Thomas	Fr
OL	60	Myles McIntyre	So
OL	61	Jackson Morrison	Fr
OL	62	Chase Sherman	Jr
OL	63	Jimmy Sellers	So
OL	64	Kyle Meyer	Jr
OL	65	Noah Taylor	So
OL	66	Jamie Thieman	Jr
OL	67	Daniel Kempf	Sr
OL	69	Max Moore	So
OL	70	Trey Kothe	Fr
OL	72	Sam Gill	So
OL	74	Zach Flott	Fr
OL	75	Dylan Morris	Jr
OL	76	Shane Smith	Sr
OL	78	Landon Kubicek	So
OL	79	Ryan Huff	So
WR	80	Shane Williams	So
WR	83	Sha'Corey Foster	Fr
WR	84	Jacob Chapple	Fr
TE	86	Demario Harris	Fr
WR	87	Hunter Ramirez	Fr
TE	89	Brock Behrndt	Jr
TE	90	TJ Schieber	Jr
TE	91	Austen Eskew	Fr
WR		Dimitri Akenten	Fr
TE		Marqus Andrews	Fr
OL		Jacob Cacek	Fr
WR		Antonio Cartagena	Fr
RB		Cam Cornelius	Fr
OL		Anthony Enriquez	Fr
WR		Isaiah Goldy	Fr
OL		TyDarrius Griffin	Fr
QB		Jayden Johnson	Fr
TE		Jordan Klingman	Fr
RB		Brody McMahon	Fr
FB		Clay Meinders	Fr
OL		Jonathan Ortiz	Fr
OL		Tim Otting	Fr
TE		Kyle Raunig	Fr
TE		Ryan Spelhaug	Fr
RB		Marquis Stewart	Fr
WR		Quincy Woods	Fr

Defense

Pos.	#	Name	Class
LB	2	Brock Sherman	Sr
S	3	Edward Richey	So
S	5	Jack Young	Jr
S	6	Kevin Berg	Jr
CB	9	Marcus Jones	So
DT	11	Collin Bevins	Jr
CB	14	Chama Pierre	Fr
S	23	Najeem Hosein	Fr
S	24	Trent Nally	Fr
LB	25	Jarrod Bishop	So
CB	27	Jack Richards	Fr
S	29	Bryce Enyard	Sr
S	31	Brad Strauss	So
CB	33	Anthony Lane	Fr
LB	36	Cole Bixler	Fr
LB	39	Cole Bonde	So
S	40	Deion Scott	Fr
LB	41	Alec Ivy	Fr
LB	43	Jacob Vollstedt	Jr
LB	45	Nick Hess	Fr
LB	47	EJ Brown	Fr
LB	50	Zach Maloley	Sr
LB	51	Breyon Dennis	Fr
DE	52	Nicholas Turner	So
LB	54	Matt Connelly	Fr
LB	55	Cole Forney	Jr
LB	56	Ben Althoff	Fr
DE	59	Seth Phillips	Fr
DT	68	Caleb Mather	So
DT	71	Brent Morrow	Fr
DE	73	Cass Weitl	Jr
DT	77	Zach Hughes	So
LB	85	Will Garza	Fr
DE	92	Bobby Gruenloh	So
DT	93	Tristan Patterson	Sr
DE	94	Keaton Hulett	So
DE	97	Marcus Stewart Jr.	Fr
DT	99	Brandon Yost	Sr
LB		Jamaal Brazil	Fr
DE		Mike Ehlke	Fr
FS		Jacob Gassman	Fr
LB		Andy Hessler	Fr
LB		Eli Keller	Fr
S		Jake Marshall	Fr
DE		Curt Mueller	Fr
DE		Spencer Phillips	Fr
DL		Zach Pierce	Fr
DB		KiAndre Pugh	Fr
DE		Myles Scott	Fr
DB		Joe Straws	Fr
LB		Connor Vincent	Fr
LB		George Wielms	Fr
DE		Joey Ziegler	Fr

Special teams

Pos.	#	Name	Class
K	30	Ben Trewyn	Jr
LS	82	William Hertel	Sr
K	88	Simon Mathiesen	Jr
P	95	Matt Thorman	Fr
K		Zack DeWitt	Fr
LS		Michael Sorfonden	Fr

Head coach

- Adam Dorrel

Coordinators/assistant coaches

- Rich Wright – Assistant Head Coach - Defensive Coordinator
- Charlie Flohr – Assistant Coach- Offensive Coordinator
- Joel Osborn – Assistant Coach- Wide Receivers/Recruiting Coordinator
- Chad Bostwick – Assistant Coach- Linebackers
- Brandon Clayton – Assistant Coach - Defensive Backs
- Spencer Barr – Graduate Assistant (DL)
- Ryan Gent – Graduate Assistant (RB)
- Matt Massey – Graduate Assistant (LB)
- Scott Reilly – Graduate Assistant (OL)
- Mickey Russell – Graduate Assistant (DL)
- Ross Sharp – Graduate Assistant (TE)
- Blake Andersen – Graduate Assistant (DL)
- Tucker Peve – Football Equipment Manager

Legend

- (C) Team captain
- (S) Suspended
- (I) Ineligible
- Injured
- Redshirt

Roster
