= Matt Mitchell (American football) =

American football coach (born 1974)

Matthew Mitchell
Current position
- Title: Associate head coach & outside linebackers coach
- Team: Wisconsin
- Conference: Big Ten

Biographical details
- Born: November 27, 1974 (age 51); Seattle, Washington, U.S.

Playing career
- 1994–1997: Cornell (IA)
- Position: Defensive lineman

Coaching career (HC unless noted)
- 2000–2001: Wartburg (def. assistant)
- 2002–2003: Wartburg (DC)
- 2004–2007: Grand Valley State (LB)
- 2008–2009: Grand Valley State (DC/LB)
- 2010–2022: Grand Valley State
- 2023–2025: Wisconsin (ST/OLB)
- 2026–present: Wisconsin (AHC/OLB)

Head coaching record
- Overall: 117–31
- Tournaments: 10–7 (NCAA D-II playoffs)

Accomplishments and honors

Championships
- 3 GLIAC (2010, 2016, 2022); 3 GLIAC North Division (2011–2012, 2016)

Matthew N. Mitchell (born November 27, 1974) is an American college football coach and former player. He is the associate head coach and outside linebackers coach for the University of Wisconsin–Madison, positions he has held since 2026 and 2023 respectively. He was the head football coach at Grand Valley State University in Allendale, Michigan from 2010 to 2022.

== Playing career ==
Mitchell was a two-time, first-team All-Midwest Conference selection as a defensive lineman during his playing career at Cornell College in Mount Vernon, Iowa, where he earned a B.S.S. in biology and secondary education in 1997.

== Coaching career ==
From 2000 to 2003, Mitchell was an assistant coach serving as linebackers coach at Wartburg College. From 2004 to 2009, he served as an assistant coach at Grand Valley State under Chuck Martin. In January 2010, Mitchell was named head coach at Grand Valley State when Martin left to join former Grand Valley State head coach Brian Kelly at Notre Dame.

== Personal life ==
Mitchell and his wife, Jen, are the parents of sons Trayton and RJ.

== Head coaching record ==
Year	Team	Overall	Conference	Standing	Bowl/playoffs	AFCA^{#}
Grand Valley State Lakers (Great Lakes Intercollegiate Athletic Conference) (2010–2022)
2010	Grand Valley State	11–2	9–1	1st	L NCAA Division II Second Round	10
2011	Grand Valley State	8–3	7–3	T–1st (North)		
2012	Grand Valley State	8–3	7–3	T–1st (North)		
2013	Grand Valley State	12–3	7–2	3rd (North)	L NCAA Division II Semifinal	3
2014	Grand Valley State	6–5	6–4	T–5th		
2015	Grand Valley State	12–3	8–2	3rd	L NCAA Division II Semifinal	4
2016	Grand Valley State	12–1	10–0	1st	L NCAA Division II Regional Final	4
2017	Grand Valley State	8–3	7–2	3rd		
2018	Grand Valley State	10–2	7–1	2nd	L NCAA Division II First Round	14
2019	Grand Valley State	8–3	5–3	4th		
2020–21	No team—COVID-19					
2021	Grand Valley State	10–2	6–1	2nd	L NCAA Division II Second Round	7
2022	Grand Valley State	12–1	6–0	1st	L NCAA Division II Quarterfinal	3
Grand Valley State:		117–31	84–22			
Total:		117–31				
National championship Conference title Conference division title or championship game berth
^{#}NCAA Division II AFCA poll.
