= 2015 North Alabama Lions football team =

American college football season

2015 North Alabama Lions football

NCAA Division II Second Round, L 31–35 vs. Tuskegee
- Conference: Gulf South Conference
- Record: 9–3 (6–1 GSC)
- Head coach: Bobby Wallace (14th season)
- Offensive coordinator: Cody Gross (4th season)
- Defensive coordinator: Chris Willis (4th season)
- Home stadium: Braly Municipal Stadium

2015 Gulf South Conference football standings
	Conf.			Overall
Team	W		L	W		L
No. 3 West Georgia +^	6	–	1	12	–	2
No. 15 North Alabama +^	6	–	1	9	–	3
No. 14 Valdosta State ^	5	–	2	9	–	3
Florida Tech	5	–	2	7	–	4
West Alabama	3	–	4	7	–	4
Delta State	2	–	5	6	–	5
Shorter	1	–	6	2	–	8
Mississippi College #	0	–	7	2	–	8
+ – Conference co-champions; ^ – NCAA Division II playoff participant; # – Provisional Division II member; Rankings from AFCA poll

The 2015 North Alabama Lions football team represented the University of North Alabama as a member of the Gulf South Conference (GSC) during the 2015 NCAA Division II football season. Being led by 14th-year head coach Bobby Wallace, the Lions compiled an overall of 9–3 with a mark of 6–1 in conference play, placing second in the GSC. North Alabama advanced to the NCAA Division II football championship playoffs for the third straight season, where the Lions defeated Newberry in the first round before losing to Tuskegee in the second round. The team played home games at Braly Municipal Stadium in Florence, Alabama.

== Schedule ==
Date	Time	Opponent	Rank	Site	Result	Attendance
September 6	6:00 p.m.	at Miles*	No. 15	Legion Field; Birmingham, AL	W 34–17	21,834
September 12	6:00 p.m.	Mississippi College	No. 13	Braly Municipal Stadium; Florence, AL	W 34–17	12,213
September 26	6:00 p.m.	Florida Tech	No. 8	Braly Municipal Stadium; Florence, AL	W 55–48	8,676
October 3	1:00 p.m.	at Valdosta State	No. 8	Bazemore–Hyder Stadium; Valdosta, GA	W 34–12	2,477
October 10	3:00 p.m.	at Western Oregon*	No. 6	McArthur Field; Monmouth, OR	L 22–24	1,889
October 17	6:00 p.m.	UNC Pembroke*	No. 17	Braly Municipal Stadium; Florence, AL	W 62–28	9,794
October 24	1:00 p.m.	at No. 2 West Georgia	No. 13	University Stadium; Carrollton, GA	L 10–31	6,827
October 31	1:30 p.m.	Delta State	No. 21	Braly Municipal Stadium; Florence, AL	W 43–17	5,568
November 7	12:30 p.m.	at Shorter	No. 19	Barron Stadium; Rome, GA	W 28–7	3,280
November 14	1:30 p.m.	West Alabama	No. 15	Braly Municipal Stadium; Florence, AL (rivalry)	W 52–14	10,023
November 21	12:00 p.m.	Newberry*	No. 14	Braly Municipal Stadium; Florence, AL (NCAA Division II First Round)	W 50–7	4,284
November 28	11:30 a.m.	Tuskegee*	No. 14	Braly Municipal Stadium; Florence, AL (NCAA Division II Second Round)	L 31–35	5,231
*Non-conference game; Rankings from AFCA Poll released prior to the game; All times are in Central time
