= 2015 NCAA Division II football season =

American college football season

- Total No. of teams: 170
- Regular season: September 4 – November 14, 2015
- Playoffs: November 21 – December 19, 2015
- National Championship: Children's Mercy Park, Kansas City, KS December 19, 2015
- Champion: Northwest Missouri State
- Harlon Hill Trophy: Jason Vander Laan, Ferris State

The 2015 NCAA Division II football season, part of college football in the United States organized by the National Collegiate Athletic Association at the Division II level, began on September 4, 2015 and ended with the NCAA Division II Football Championship on December 19, 2015 at Children's Mercy Park in Kansas City, Kansas. Northwest Missouri State won its second national title in three seasons and fifth overall, defeating Shepherd, 34–7.

== D-II wins over FCS teams ==
September 19, 2015 - Chowan 31, Delaware State 30
September 26, 2015 - Shorter 26, Southeast Missouri State 21

== Conference changes and new programs ==
School	Former conference	New conference
McMurry War Hawks	Lone Star	American Southwest (D-III)
Oklahoma Baptist Bison	CSFL (NAIA)	Great American
Paine Lions	SIAC	Dropped program

Northwestern Oklahoma State and Virginia–Wise completed their transitions to Division II and became eligible for the postseason.

== Conference standings ==
=== Super Region 1 ===
2015 Central Intercollegiate Athletic Association football standings
	Conf.			Overall
Team	W		L	W		L
Northern Division
Bowie State xy^	7	–	0	9	–	3
Virginia Union ^	6	–	1	8	–	2
Chowan	4	–	3	6	–	4
Virginia State	4	–	3	6	–	4
Elizabeth City State	2	–	5	4	–	5
Lincoln (PA)	1	–	6	3	–	7
Southern Division
Winston-Salem State xy$	5	–	2	6	–	5
Livingstone	4	–	3	5	–	3
Johnson C. Smith	3	–	4	4	–	6
Fayetteville State	4	–	3	4	–	6
Shaw	1	–	6	1	–	9
St. Augustine's	1	–	6	1	–	9
Championship: Winston–Salem St. 17, Bowie St. 14
$ – Conference champion; x – Division champion/co-champions; y – Championship game participant; ^ – NCAA Division II playoff participant

2015 Mountain East Conference football standings
	Conf.			Overall
Team	W		L	W		L
No. 2 Shepherd $^	10	–	0	13	–	1
No. 20 Charleston (WV) ^	9	–	1	10	–	2
Glenville State	6	–	4	7	–	4
Fairmont State	6	–	4	6	–	4
Concord	5	–	5	5	–	5
Notre Dame (OH)	5	–	5	5	–	6
West Liberty	5	–	5	5	–	6
West Virginia State	5	–	5	5	–	6
West Virginia Wesleyan	2	–	8	2	–	8
Urbana	1	–	9	2	–	9
Virginia–Wise	1	–	9	1	–	10
$ – Conference champion; ^ – NCAA Division II playoff participant; Rankings from AFCA poll

2015 Northeast-10 Conference football standings
	Conf.			Overall
Team	W		L	W		L
No. 17 Assumption y$^	8	–	1	11	–	2
New Haven y	7	–	2	7	–	4
Merrimack	6	–	3	6	–	5
LIU Post	5	–	4	7	–	4
Stonehill	5	–	4	7	–	4
Bentley	5	–	4	5	–	6
American International	4	–	5	4	–	7
Southern Connecticut	3	–	6	4	–	7
Saint Anselm	2	–	7	3	–	8
Pace	0	–	9	1	–	10
Championship: Assumption 17, New Haven 14
$ – Conference champion; y – Championship game participant; ^ – NCAA Division II playoff participant; Rankings from AFCA poll

2015 Pennsylvania State Athletic Conference football standings
	Conf.			Overall
Team	W		L	W		L
East
West Chester xy	6	–	1	7	–	4
Shippensburg	5	–	2	8	–	3
Bloomsburg	5	–	2	7	–	4
Kutztown	5	–	2	7	–	4
East Stroudsburg	4	–	3	6	–	5
Lock Haven	2	–	5	2	–	9
Millersville	1	–	6	2	–	9
Cheyney	0	–	7	0	–	11
West
No. 7 Slippery Rock xy$^	6	–	1	11	–	1
No. 19 IUP x^	6	–	1	9	–	2
California (PA)	5	–	2	8	–	3
Clarion	4	–	3	7	–	4
Gannon	3	–	4	6	–	5
Mercyhurst	2	–	5	5	–	6
Seton Hill	2	–	5	3	–	8
Edinboro	0	–	7	0	–	11
Championship: Slippery Rock 61, West Chester 12
$ – Conference champion; x – Division champion/co-champions; y – Championship game participant; ^ – NCAA Division II playoff participant; Rankings from AFCA poll

=== Super Region 2 ===
2015 Gulf South Conference football standings
	Conf.			Overall
Team	W		L	W		L
No. 3 West Georgia +^	6	–	1	12	–	2
No. 15 North Alabama +^	6	–	1	9	–	3
No. 14 Valdosta State ^	5	–	2	9	–	3
Florida Tech	5	–	2	7	–	4
West Alabama	3	–	4	7	–	4
Delta State	2	–	5	6	–	5
Shorter	1	–	6	2	–	8
Mississippi College #	0	–	7	2	–	8
+ – Conference co-champions; ^ – NCAA Division II playoff participant; # – Provisional Division II member; Rankings from AFCA poll

2015 South Atlantic Conference football standings
	Conf.			Overall
Team	W		L	W		L
No. 25 Catawba $^	6	–	1	9	–	3
No. 21 Carson–Newman ^	5	–	2	9	–	3
Mars Hill	5	–	2	6	–	5
Newberry ^	4	–	3	7	–	5
Wingate	3	–	4	6	–	5
Lenoir–Rhyne	3	–	4	5	–	5
Tusculum	2	–	5	4	–	7
Brevard	0	–	7	0	–	11
$ – Conference champion; ^ – NCAA Division II playoff participant; Rankings from AFCA Poll

2015 Southern Intercollegiate Athletic Conference football standings
	Conf.			Overall
Team	W		L	W		L
East Division
Albany State xy	4	–	0	6	–	4
Fort Valley State	3	–	1	5	–	4
Morehouse	2	–	2	5	–	5
Clark Atlanta	1	–	3	1	–	8
Benedict	0	–	4	0	–	10
West Division
Miles xy$	5	–	0	7	–	5
No. 11 Tuskegee ^	4	–	1	10	–	3
Central State (OH)	2	–	3	5	–	5
Kentucky State	2	–	3	3	–	7
Stillman	1	–	4	3	–	6
Lane	1	–	4	3	–	7
Championship: Miles 20, Albany State 7
$ – Conference champion; x – Division champion/co-champions; y – Championship game participant; ^ – NCAA Division II playoff participant; Rankings from AFCA poll

2015 NCAA Division II Super Region 2 independents football records
	Conf.			Overall
Team	W		L	W		L
North Greenville		–		7	–	3
UNC Pembroke		–		6	–	4
Limestone		–		2	–	8

=== Super Region 3 ===
2015 Great American Conference football standings
	Conf.			Overall
Team	W		L	W		L
No. 12 Henderson State $^	10	–	1	11	–	2
SW Oklahoma State #	8	–	3	8	–	4
Arkansas Tech #	8	–	3	9	–	3
Harding	7	–	4	7	–	4
Ouachita Baptist	7	–	4	7	–	4
Southern Arkansas	7	–	4	7	–	4
SE Oklahoma State	6	–	5	6	–	5
East Central	6	–	5	6	–	5
NW Oklahoma State	3	–	8	3	–	8
Oklahoma Baptist *	2	–	9	2	–	9
Arkansas–Monticello	1	–	10	1	–	10
Southern Nazarene]	1	–	10	1	–	10
$ – Conference champion; ^ – NCAA Division II playoff participant; # – bowl participant (Arkansas Tech: C.H.A.M.P.S. Heart of Texas Bowl, SW Oklahoma State: Live United Texarkana Bowl) * – Provisional NCAA Division II member; Rankings from AFCA poll

2015 Great Northwest Athletic Conference football standings
	Conf.			Overall
Team	W		L	W		L
No. 16 Humboldt State $^	6	–	0	10	–	2
Western Oregon	5	–	1	7	–	4
Azusa Pacific	3	–	3	6	–	4
Central Washington	3	–	3	5	–	5
South Dakota Mines	2	–	4	6	–	5
Dixie State	2	–	4	3	–	7
Simon Fraser	0	–	6	0	–	9
$ – Conference champion; ^ – NCAA Division II playoff participant; Rankings from AFCA poll

2015 Mid-America Intercollegiate Athletics Association football standings
	Conf.			Overall
Team	W		L	W		L
No. 1 NW Missouri State $^	11	–	0	15	–	0
No. 8 Emporia State ^	9	–	2	11	–	3
Central Missouri	8	–	3	8	–	3
Fort Hays State #	8	–	3	8	–	4
Central Oklahoma #	6	–	5	7	–	5
Missouri Western	6	–	5	6	–	5
Pittsburg State	6	–	5	6	–	5
Washburn	5	–	6	5	–	6
Lindenwood	3	–	8	3	–	8
Northeastern State	3	–	8	3	–	8
Missouri Southern	1	–	10	1	–	10
Nebraska–Kearney	0	–	11	0	–	11
$ – Conference champion; ^ – NCAA Division II playoff participant; # – bowl participant (Fort Hays State: Mineral Water Bowl, Central Oklahoma: Live United Texarkana Bowl; Rankings from AFCA poll)

2015 Northern Sun Intercollegiate Conference football standings
	Conf.			Overall
Team	W		L	W		L
North Division
Minnesota–Duluth #	8	–	3	9	–	3
Bemidji State	7	–	4	7	–	4
Northern State	6	–	5	6	–	5
St. Cloud State	6	–	5	6	–	5
Minnesota State–Moorhead	6	–	5	6	–	5
Minot State	1	–	10	1	–	10
Mary	1	–	10	1	–	10
Minnesota–Crookston]	1	–	10	1	–	10
South Division
No. 13 Minnesota State $^	10	–	1	10	–	2
No. 24 Augustana (SD) ^	9	–	2	9	–	3
No. 22 Sioux Falls ^	9	–	2	9	–	3
SW Minnesota State	8	–	3	8	–	3
Upper Iowa	6	–	5	6	–	5
Winona State	5	–	6	5	–	6
Wayne State (NE)	4	–	7	4	–	7
Concordia–St. Paul	1	–	10	1	–	10
$ – Conference champion; ^ – NCAA Division II playoff participant; # – Mineral Water Bowl participant; Rankings from AFCA poll

=== Super Region 4 ===
2015 Great Lakes Intercollegiate Athletic Conference football standings
	Conf.			Overall
Team	W		L	W		L
No. 6 Ferris State +^	10	–	0	11	–	1
No. 10 Ashland +^	10	–	0	10	–	1
No. 4 Grand Valley State ^	8	–	2	12	–	3
Ohio Dominican	7	–	3	8	–	3
Michigan Tech	7	–	3	7	–	3
Findlay	5	–	5	6	–	5
Wayne State (MI)	5	–	5	6	–	5
Hillsdale	5	–	5	5	–	6
Northwood	5	–	5	5	–	6
Northern Michigan	4	–	6	5	–	6
Tiffin	4	–	6	5	–	6
Walsh	2	–	8	2	–	8
Lake Erie	2	–	8	2	–	9
Saginaw Valley State	1	–	9	1	–	10
Malone	0	–	10	0	–	10
$ – Conference champion; ^ – NCAA Division II playoff participant; Rankings from AFCA poll

2015 Great Lakes Valley Conference football standings
	Conf.			Overall
Team	W		L	W		L
No. 18 Indianapolis $^	8	–	0	10	–	2
McKendree	6	–	2	8	–	2
Missouri S&T	5	–	3	5	–	5
Truman State	4	–	4	5	–	6
William Jewell	4	–	4	4	–	7
Saint Joseph's (IN)	3	–	5	4	–	6
Southwest Baptist	3	–	5	4	–	6
Quincy	3	–	5	3	–	7
Lincoln (MO)	0	–	8	1	–	10
$ – Conference champion; ^ – NCAA Division II playoff participant; Rankings from AFCA poll

2015 Lone Star Conference football standings
	Conf.			Overall
Team	W		L	W		L
No. 23 Texas A&M–Commerce $^	6	–	0	8	–	4
No. 9 Midwestern State ^	5	–	1	10	–	2
Angelo State	3	–	3	7	–	4
West Texas A&M	3	–	3	6	–	4
Eastern New Mexico #	3	–	3	6	–	6
Tarleton State	1	–	5	3	–	7
Texas A&M–Kingsville	0	–	6	2	–	9
$ – Conference champion; ^ – NCAA Division II playoff participant; # – C.H.A.M.P.S. Heart of Texas Bowl participant; Rankings from AFCA poll

2015 Rocky Mountain Athletic Conference football standings
	Conf.			Overall
Team	W		L	W		L
No. 5 CSU Pueblo $^	9	–	0	12	–	2
Colorado Mesa	8	–	1	9	–	2
Colorado Mines	6	–	3	8	–	3
Fort Lewis	6	–	3	7	–	4
Chadron State	4	–	5	5	–	6
Western State (CO)	4	–	5	4	–	7
Western New Mexico	3	–	6	4	–	7
Adams State	3	–	6	3	–	8
New Mexico Highlands	2	–	7	2	–	9
Black Hills State	0	–	9	0	–	11
$ – Conference champion; ^ – NCAA Division II playoff participant; Rankings from AFCA poll

2015 NCAA Division II Super Region 4 independents football records
	Conf.			Overall
Team	W		L	W		L
Alderson Broaddus		–		7	–	4
OK Panhandle State		–		5	–	5
Kentucky Wesleyan		–		5	–	6

== Postseason ==
The 2015 NCAA Division II Football Championship Postseason involved 28 schools playing in a single-elimination tournament to determine the national champion of men's NCAA Division II college football. Miles College, the SIAC champion, was not eligible to postseason due to its participation to the 2015 Turkey Day Classic against Alabama State (FCS).

=== Playoff bracket ===
First round November 21, 2015
4	Charleston (WV)*	21
5	IUP	47
2	Slippery Rock*	40
7	Virginia Union	21
3	Assumption*	51
6	Bowie State	29
4	CSU Pueblo*	27
5	Indianapolis	14
2	Ferris State*	48
7	Texas A&M–Commerce	30
3	Ashland*	28
6	Grand Valley State	45
4	Valdosta State*	61
5	Carson–Newman	59
2	North Alabama*	50
7	Newberry	7
3	Catawba*	16
6	Tuskegee	26
4	Humboldt State*	45
5	Augustana (SD)	31
2	Minnesota State*	49
7	Emporia State	51
3	Henderson State*	23
6	Sioux Falls	16

Second round November 28, 2015
1	Shepherd*	17
5	IUP	13
2	Slippery Rock*	41
3	Assumption	39
1	Midwestern State*	17
4	CSU Pueblo	26
2	Ferris State*	34
6	Grand Valley State	38
1	West Georgia*	27
4	Valdosta State	20
2	North Alabama*	31
6	Tuskegee	35
1	NW Missouri State*	54
4	Humboldt State	7
7	Emporia State	29
3	Henderson State*	3

Quarterfinals; December 5, 2015
1	Shepherd*	28
2	Slippery Rock	16
4	CSU Pueblo*	7
6	Grand Valley State	31
1	West Georgia*	35
6	Tuskegee	6
1	NW Missouri State*	38
7	Emporia State	17

Semifinals; December 12, 2015
1	Shepherd*	34
6	Grand Valley State	32
1	West Georgia	23
1	NW Missouri State*	38

Championship; December 19, 2015
1	Shepherd	7
1	NW Missouri State	34

* Home team † Overtime Winner

== See also ==
- 2015 NCAA Division I FBS football season
- 2015 NCAA Division I FCS football season
- 2015 NCAA Division III football season
- 2015 NAIA football season
