= 2015 Shepherd Rams football team =

American college football season

2015 Shepherd Rams football

NCAA Division II Championship finalist MEC champion

NCAA Division II Championship Game, L 7-34– vs. Northwest Missouri State
- Conference: Mountain East Conference

Ranking
- AFCA: No. 2
- Record: 13–1 (10–0 MEC)
- Head coach: Monte Cater (29th season)
- Offensive coordinator: Ernie McCook (6th season)
- Defensive coordinator: Josh Kline (7th season)
- Home stadium: Ram Stadium

2015 Mountain East Conference football standings
| | Conf. | | | Overall |
| Team | W | | L | W | | L |
|---|---|---|---|---|---|---|
| No. 2 Shepherd $^ | 10 | – | 0 | 13 | – | 1 |
| No. 20 Charleston (WV) ^ | 9 | – | 1 | 10 | – | 2 |
| Glenville State | 6 | – | 4 | 7 | – | 4 |
| Fairmont State | 6 | – | 4 | 6 | – | 4 |
| Concord | 5 | – | 5 | 5 | – | 5 |
| Notre Dame (OH) | 5 | – | 5 | 5 | – | 6 |
| West Liberty | 5 | – | 5 | 5 | – | 6 |
| West Virginia State | 5 | – | 5 | 5 | – | 6 |
| West Virginia Wesleyan | 2 | – | 8 | 2 | – | 8 |
| Urbana | 1 | – | 9 | 2 | – | 9 |
| Virginia–Wise | 1 | – | 9 | 1 | – | 10 |
$ – Conference champion; ^ – NCAA Division II playoff participant; Rankings from AFCA poll

The 2015 Shepherd Rams football team represented Shepherd University as a member of the Mountain East Conference (MEC) during the 2015 NCAA Division II football season. Led by 29th-year head coach Monte Cater, the Rams compiled an overall record of 13–1 with a mark of 10–0 in conference play, winning the MEC title. Shepherd advanced to the NCAA Division II Football Championship playoffs and received a first-round bye. They beat IUP in the second round, Slippery Rock in the quarterfinals, and Grand Valley State in the semifinals, before losing the NCAA Division II Championship Game to Northwest Missouri State. The Rams played their home games at Ram Stadium in Shepherdstown, West Virginia.

== Regular season ==
The 2015 regular season for the Rams consisted of 10 games against Mountain East Conference foes. The Rams went undefeated in the regular season and were given the top seed in Super Region I in the 2015 NCAA Division II football playoffs.

== Playoffs ==
The Rams received a first-round bye in the playoffs, being the top-ranked team in Super Region 1. Their first postseason game was at home against IUP, a 17–13 win.

The Rams then went on to defeat Slippery Rock, 28–16, in a quarterfinal game to continue their playoff run.

In the national semifinals on December 12, 2015, the Rams played Grand Valley State. The Rams won the game 34–32, to reach the 2015 NCAA Division II Football Championship Game.

In the National Championship game, Shepherd lost to NW Missouri State 34–7.

== Schedule ==
| Date | Time | Opponent | Rank | Site | TV | Result | Attendance | Source |
|---|---|---|---|---|---|---|---|---|
| September 5 | 12:00 p.m. | at West Virginia Wesleyan | | Ross Field; Buckhannon, WV | | W 43–0 | 2,681 | |
| September 12 | 12:00 p.m. | Charleston (WV) | No. 25 | Ram Stadium; Shepherdstown, WV | | W 45–25 | 3,017 | |
| September 19 | 1:00 p.m. | at Virginia–Wise | No. 20 | Carl Smith Stadium; Wise, VA | | W 41–10 | 1,008 | |
| September 26 | 12:00 p.m. | Notre Dame (OH) | No. 16 | Ram Stadium; Shepherdstown, WV | | W 43–14 | 4,713 | |
| October 10 | 1:00 p.m. | at Glenville State | No. 10 | Morris Stadium; Glenville, WV | | W 48–31 | 1,094 | |
| October 17 | 12:00 p.m. | West Virginia State | No. 9 | Ram Stadium; Shepherdstown, WV | | W 46–17 | 4,119 | |
| October 24 | 12:00 p.m. | at Concord | No. 9 | Callaghan Stadium; Athens, WV | | W 35–28 | 1,252 | |
| October 31 | 12:00 p.m. | West Liberty | No. 6 | Ram Stadium; Shepherdstown, WV | | W 44–10 | 4,789 | |
| November 5 | 7:10 p.m. | at Fairmont State | No. 6 | Duvall-Rosier Field; Fairmont, WV | | W 41–14 | 939 | |
| November 14 | 12:00 p.m. | Urbana | No. 5 | Ram Stadium; Shepherdstown, WV | | W 52–20 | 4,489 | |
| November 28 | 12:00 p.m. | IUP* | No. 5 | Ram Stadium; Shepherdstown, WV (NCAA Division II Second Round) | | W 17–13 | 5,007 | |
| December 5 | 12:00 p.m. | No. 10 Slippery Rock* | No. 5 | Ram Stadium; Shepherdstown, WV (NCAA Division II Quarterfinal) | | W 28–16 | 5,321 | |
| December 12 | 12:00 p.m. | No. 12 Grand Valley State* | No. 5 | Ram Stadium; Shepherdstown, WV (NCAA Division II Semifinal) | ESPN3 | W 34–32 | 6,496 | |
| December 19 | 3:00 p.m. | vs. No. 1 Northwest Missouri State* | No. 5 | Sporting Park; Kansas City, KS (NCAA Division II National Championship) | ESPN2 | L 7–34 | 16,181 | |
*Non-conference game; Rankings from AFCA Poll released prior to the game; All times are in Eastern time
