= Grand Valley State Lakers football, 2010–2019 =

American college football season

2010–2019 Grand Valley State Lakers football
- Conference: Great Lakes Intercollegiate Athletic Conference
- Head coach: Matt Mitchell (2010–2019)
- Home stadium: Lubbers Stadium (2010–2019)

The Grand Valley State Lakers football program, 2010–2019 represented Grand Valley State University (GVSU) during the 2010s in NCAA Division II college football as a member of the Great Lakes Intercollegiate Athletic Conference (GLIAC). The team was led by head coach Matt Mitchell was hired as head coach in January 2010 and held the position through the 2021 season. During the 2010s, the Lakers compiled a 95–28 record, won or tied for five conference or divisional championships and advanced to the NCAA Division II playoffs five times.

The team played its home games at Lubbers Stadium, named after former university president Arend Lubbers, located on GVSU's main campus in Allendale, Michigan.

== 2010 ==
2010 Grand Valley State Lakers football

GLIAC champion

NCAA Division II second round, L 6–38 vs. Augustana (SD)
- Conference: Great Lakes Intercollegiate Athletic Conference
- North Division

Ranking
- AFCA: No. 10
- Record: 11–2 (9–1 GLIAC)
- Head coach: Matt Mitchell (1st season)
- Offensive coordinator: Eric Koehler (3rd season)
- Home stadium: Lubbers Stadium

2010 Great Lakes Intercollegiate Athletic Conference football standings
	Conf.			Overall
Team	W		L	W		L
North
No. 10 Grand Valley State $^	9	–	1	11	–	2
No. 25 Michigan Tech	8	–	2	8	–	2
Indianapolis	5	–	5	6	–	5
Ferris State	5	–	5	5	–	6
Northern Michigan	5	–	5	5	–	6
Northwood	5	–	5	5	–	6
Saginaw Valley State	4	–	6	4	–	7
South
No. 21 Wayne State (MI)	8	–	2	9	–	2
No. 16 Hillsdale ^	8	–	2	9	–	3
Ashland	7	–	3	8	–	3
Lake Erie	3	–	7	3	–	8
Ohio Dominican *	2	–	8	2	–	8
Findlay	1	–	9	1	–	10
Tiffin	0	–	10	1	–	10
$ – Conference champion; ^ – NCAA Division II playoff participant; * – Provisional Division II member; Rankings from AFCA poll

The 2010 Grand Valley State Lakers football team represented Grand Valley State University (GVSU) as a member of the Great Lakes Intercollegiate Athletic Conference (GLIAC) during the 2010 NCAA Division II football season. In their first season under head coach Matt Mitchell, the Lakers compiled an 11–2 record (10–1 regular season, 9–1 in conference games), won the program's sixth consecutive GLIAC championship, and outscored opponents by a total of 469 to 249. They advanced to the NCAA Division II playoffs for the tenth consecutive year, defeating Colorado Mines before losing to Augustana (SD) in the second round.

Mitchell was hired as head coach in January 2010, replacing Chuck Martin. Mitchell, age 35, had been the team's defensive coordinator since 2008 and was also the son-in-law of GVSU athletic director Tim Selgo.

Two new teams (Lake Erie and Ohio Dominican) were added to the GLIAC in 2010, bringing the total membership to 14 teams. In a pre-season coaches poll, GVSU was picked to win the conference championship despite having lost players who had generated 80% of its rushing yardage and 100% of its passing yards.

Quarterback Kyle McMahon, a transfer from Eastern Michigan, completed 181 of 320 passes (56.6%) for 2,616 yards, 24 touchdowns, 11 interceptions, and a 143.1 passing efficiency rating. He also tallied 584 rushing yards to lead the team with 3,199 yards of total offense. McMahon was also the team's leading scorer with 80 points on 13 rushing touchdowns and a two-point conversion. The team's other statistical leaders included:

- Running back Justin Sherrod led the team with 1,052 rushing yards on 145 carries for an average of 7.3 yards per carry. Sherrod also had 47 receptions for 407 yards and led the team with 1,526 all-purpose yards.
- Wide receiver Greg Gay was the leading receiver with 50 receptions for 769 yards (15.4 yards per reception).
- Linebacker Justin Victor led the team with 120 total tackles.

=== Schedule ===
Date	Opponent	Rank	Site	Result	Attendance	Source
September 2	No. 8 West Texas A&M*	No. 2	Lubbers Stadium; Allendale, MI	W 34–31	13,128	
September 11	No. 11 Hillsdale	No. 1	Lubbers Stadium; Allendale, MI	W 44–41	11,637	
September 18	Indianapolis	No. 1	Lubbers Stadium; Allendale, MI	W 38–31	11,682	
September 25	at Findlay	No. 1	Donnell Stadium; Findlay, OH	W 35–7	1,501	
October 2	at Tiffin	No. 1	Frost-Kalnow Stadium; Tiffin OH	W 71–10	335	
October 9	Northern Michigan^{†}	No. 1	Lubbers Stadium; Allendale, MI	W 28–7	12,307	
October 16	Lake Erie	No. 1	Lubbers Stadium; Allendale, MI	W 57–23	8,495	
October 23	at Ferris State	No. 1	Top Taggart Field; Big Rapids, MI (Anchor-Bone Classic)	W 41–0	3,256	
October 30	at Michigan Tech	No. 1	Sherman Field; Houghton, MI	L 17–20	1,976	
November 6	Northwood	No. 8	Lubbers Stadium; Allendale, MI	W 35–21	9,102	
November 13	at Saginaw Valley State	No. 6	Harvey Randall Wickes Memorial Stadium; University Center, MI (Battle of the Valleys)	W 28–7	8,927	
November 20	No. 16 Colorado Mines	No. 6	Lubbers Stadium; Allendale, MI (NCAA Division II first round)	W 35–13	4,709	
November 27	No. 9 Augustana (SD)	No. 6	Kirkeby-Over Stadium; Sioux Falls, SD (NCAA Division II second round)	L 6–38	2,514	
*Non-conference game; ^{†}Homecoming; Rankings from AFCA Poll released prior to the game

== 2011 ==
2011 Grand Valley State Lakers football

GLIAC North champion
- Conference: Great Lakes Intercollegiate Athletic Conference
- North Division
- Record: 8–3 (7–3 GLIAC)
- Head coach: Matt Mitchell (2nd season)
- Offensive coordinator: Eric Koehler (4th season)
- Home stadium: Lubbers Stadium

2011 Great Lakes Intercollegiate Athletic Conference football standings
	Conf.			Overall
Team	W		L	W		L
North
Grand Valley State	7	–	3	8	–	3
Saginaw Valley State ^	7	–	3	7	–	4
Indianapolis	6	–	4	7	–	4
Michigan Tech	6	–	4	7	–	4
Ferris State	5	–	5	6	–	5
Northern Michigan	3	–	7	4	–	7
Northwood	1	–	9	2	–	9
South
Hillsdale $	8	–	2	8	–	3
No. 2 Wayne State (MI) ^	7	–	3	12	–	4
Ohio Dominican	6	–	4	7	–	4
Ashland	6	–	4	6	–	5
Findlay	6	–	4	6	–	5
Lake Erie	2	–	8	3	–	8
Tiffin	0	–	10	0	–	11
$ – Conference champion; ^ – NCAA Division II playoff participant; Rankings from AFCA poll

The 2011 Grand Valley State Lakers football team represented Grand Valley State University as a member of the Great Lakes Intercollegiate Athletic Conference (GLIAC) during the 2011 NCAA Division II football season. In their second season under head coach Matt Mitchell, the Lakers compiled an 8–3 record (7–3 in conference games), won the GLIAC North championship, and outscored opponents by a total of 466 to 223. The Lakers were not invited to participate in the Division II playoffs for the first time since 2000.

Sophomore quarterback Heath Parling completed 154 of 249 passes (61.8%) for 2,415 yards, 34 touchdowns, 10 interceptions, and a 180.3 passing efficiency rating. He also tallied 128 rushing yards to lead the team with 2,543 yards of total offense (231.2 yards per game). The team's other statistical leaders included:

- Wide receiver Charles Johnson tallied 56 receptions for 1,030 yards, an average of 18.4 yards per reception. He also led the team in scoring with 15 touchdowns for 90 points scored.
- Running back Hersey Jackson was the team's leading rusher with 764 yards on 135 carries (5.7 yards per carry).
- Norman Shuford led the team with an average of 7.6 yards per carry. He tallied 656 rushing yards on only 86 carries.
- Brad Howard was the team's leading tackler with 79 total tackles.
- Erik Thompson led the team with five interceptions, including two returned for touchdowns. Thompson also led the team with 562 yards on kickoff returns (an average of 44.1 per return) and returned two kickoffs for touchdowns.

=== Schedule ===
Date	Opponent	Site	Result	Attendance	Source
September 1	Western Oregon	Lubbers Stadium; Allendale, MI	W 44–20	15,004	
September 10	at Hillsdale	Hillsdale, MI	L 31–34	2,887	
September 17	at Indianapolis	Indianapolis, IN	L 33–34	5,346	
September 24	Findlay	Lubbers Stadium; Allendale, MI	L 20–26	9.132	
October 1	Tiffin	Lubbers Stadium; Allendale, MI	W 70–7	9,173	
October 8	at Northern Michigan	Superior Dome; Marquette, MI	W 42–7	3,817	
October 15	at Lake Erie	Britt Memorial Stadium; Painesville, OH	W 61–31	1,073	
October 22	Ferris State	Lubbers Stadium; Allendale, MI (Anchor-Bone Classic)	W 57–10	9,197	
October 29	Michigan Tech	Lubbers Stadium; Allendale, MI	W 24–20	9,199	
November 5	at Northwood	Hantz Stadium; Midland, MI	W 35–10	1,117	
November 12	Saginaw Valley State	Lubbers Stadium; Allendale, MI (Battle of the Valleys)	W 49–24	11,163	

== 2012 ==
2012 Grand Valley State Lakers football

GLIAC North champion
- Conference: Great Lakes Intercollegiate Athletic Conference
- North Division
- Record: 8–3 (7–3 GLIAC)
- Head coach: Matt Mitchell (3rd season)
- Offensive coordinator: Eric Koehler (5th season)
- Home stadium: Lubbers Stadium

2012 Great Lakes Intercollegiate Athletic Conference football standings
	Conf.			Overall
Team	W		L	W		L
North
Grand Valley State	7	–	3	8	–	3
Saginaw Valley State	7	–	3	8	–	3
Michigan Tech	7	–	3	7	–	3
Hillsdale	7	–	3	7	–	4
Ferris State	6	–	4	7	–	4
Wayne State (MI)	5	–	5	5	–	5
Northwood	4	–	6	5	–	6
Northern Michigan	4	–	6	5	–	6
South
No. 9 Ashland $^	10	–	0	11	–	1
Ohio Dominican	7	–	3	8	–	3
Findlay	7	–	3	7	–	3
Lake Erie	3	–	7	3	–	8
Notre Dame (OH)	2	–	8	3	–	8
Tiffin	2	–	8	3	–	8
Walsh *	2	–	8	3	–	8
Malone *	1	–	9	1	–	9
$ – Conference champion; ^ – NCAA Division II playoff participant; * – Provisional Division II member; Rankings from AFCA poll

The 2012 Grand Valley State Lakers football team represented Grand Valley State University as a member of the Great Lakes Intercollegiate Athletic Conference (GLIAC) during the 2012 NCAA Division II football season. In their third season under head coach Matt Mitchell, the Lakers compiled an 8–3 record (7–3 in conference games), won the GLIAC North championship, and outscored opponents by a total of 461 to 347.

Sophomore quarterback Isiah Grimes took over at the position after Heath Parling suffered a season-ending knee injury. Grimes started seven games for the Lakers, completing 119 of 203 passes (58.6%) for 2,213 yards, 22 touchdowns, eight interceptions, and a 178.1 passing efficiency rating. Other statistical leaders included:

- Charles Johnson tallied 72 receptions for 1,199 yards and 16 touchdowns. He also led the team in scoring 98 points.
- Kirk Spencer led the team with 978 rushing yards on 129 carries for an average of 7.6 yards per carry. Spencer also tallied 380 yards on kick returns and led the team with 1,358 all-purpose yards.
- Charles Hill led the defense with 91 total tackles and 11 tackles for loss.

=== Schedule ===
Date	Opponent	Rank	Site	Result	Attendance	Source
September 1	at Western Oregon*		McArthur Field; Monmouth, OR	W 48–20	1,556	
September 8	Notre Dame (OH)		Lubbers Stadium; Allendale, MI	W 83–46	15,139	
September 15	at Tiffin		Frost Kalnow; Tiffin, OH	W 28–0	1,161	
September 22	Ohio Dominican		Lubbers Stadium; Allendale, MI	W 46–41	10,499	
September 29	at No. 22 Michigan Tech		Sherman Field; Houghton, MI	W 51–43	4,684	
October 6	Ferris State		Lubbers Stadium; Allendale, MI (Anchor-Bone Classic)	L 24–40	13,456	
October 13	at Northern Michigan		Superior Dome; Marquette, MI	L 10–38	2,217	
October 20	Northwood		Lubbers Stadium; Allendale, MI	W 42–28	12,098	
October 27	at No. 24 Hillsdale		Muddy Waters Stadium; Hillsdale, MI	W 42–23	2.878	
November 3	Wayne State (MI)		Lubbers Stadium; Allendale, MI	W 35–13	8.977	
November 10	at Saginaw Valley State	No. 15	Harvey Randall Wickes Memorial Stadium; University Center, MI (Battle of the Valleys)	L 52–55	9,607	
*Non-conference game; Rankings from AFCA Poll released prior to the game

== 2013 ==
2013 Grand Valley State Lakers football

NCAA Division II semifinals, L 13–27 vs. Northwest Missouri State
- Conference: Great Lakes Intercollegiate Athletic Conference
- North Division

Ranking
- AFCA: No. 3
- Record: 12–3 (7–2 GLIAC)
- Head coach: Matt Mitchell (4th season)
- Home stadium: Lubbers Stadium

2013 Great Lakes Intercollegiate Athletic Conference football standings
	Conf.			Overall
Team	W		L	W		L
North
No. 22 Saginaw Valley State ^	9	–	1	9	–	3
Ferris State	8	–	2	8	–	3
No. 3 Grand Valley State ^	7	–	2	12	–	3
Michigan Tech	6	–	4	6	–	4
Hillsdale	5	–	4	5	–	6
Northern Michigan	3	–	7	3	–	7
Wayne State (MI)	3	–	7	3	–	8
Northwood	1	–	8	2	–	9
South
No. 12 Ohio Dominican $^	9	–	0	10	–	1
Findlay	6	–	3	8	–	3
Ashland	5	–	4	5	–	5
Lake Erie	3	–	6	4	–	7
Walsh	3	–	6	3	–	8
Malone	1	–	8	2	–	9
Tiffin	1	–	8	2	–	9
$ – Conference champion; ^ – NCAA Division II playoff participant; Rankings from AFCA poll

The 2013 Grand Valley State Lakers football team represented Grand Valley State University as a member of the Great Lakes Intercollegiate Athletic Conference (GLIAC) during the 2013 NCAA Division II football season. In their fourth season under head coach Matt Mitchell, the Lakers compiled a 12–3 record (9–2 regular season, 7–2 in conference games) and outscored opponents by a total of 525 to 364. They advanced to the NCAA Division II playoffs where they defeated Saginaw Valley State, No. 3 CSU Pueblo, and No. 19 West Texas A&M before losing to No. 2 Northwest Missouri State in the semifinals.

The team's statistical leaders included Heath Parling with 2,441 passing yards and 27 touchdown passes; Michael Ratay with 1,012 rushing yards; Jamie Potts with 54 receptions for 899 yards; kicker Joel Schipper with 105 points scored; and Jordan Kaufman and Deonte' Hurst with 109 total tackles each.

=== Schedule ===
Date	Opponent	Rank	Site	Result	Attendance	Source
September 7	Azusa Pacific*		Lubbers Stadium; Allendale, MI	W 38–17	13,659	
September 14	Truman State*		Lubbers Stadium; Allendale, MI	W 31–15	10,696	
September 21	Tiffin		Lubbers Stadium; Allendale, MI	W 42–17	10,761	
September 28	at Ohio Dominican		Columbus, OH	L 14–57	1,987	
October 5	Michigan Tech	No. 25	Lubbers Stadium; Allendale, MI	W 49–3	13,127	
October 12	at Ferris State		Big Rapids, MI (Anchor-Bone Classic)	L 44-54	4,958	
October 19	Northern Michigan		Lubbers Stadium; Allendale, MI	W 48–17	13,391	
October 26	at Northwood		Midland, MI	W 23–17	2,612	
November 2	Hillsdale		Lubbers Stadium; Allendale, MI	W 31–21	8,129	
November 9	at Wayne State (MI)		Tom Adams Field; Detroit, MI	W 34–20	4,429	
November 16	No. 15 Saginaw Valley State		Lubbers Stadium; Allendale, MI (Battle of the Valleys)	W 49–34	11,888	
November 23	No. 21 Saginaw Valley State*	No. 22	Lubbers Stadium; Allendale, MI (NCAA DII playoffs)	W 40–7	5,098	
November 30	at No. 3 CSU Pueblo*	No. 22	Ned and Edde DeRose ThunderBowl; Pueblo, CO (NCAA DII playoffs)	W 34–30	5,287	
December 7	No. 19 West Texas A&M*	No. 22	Lubbers Stadium; Allendale, MI (NCAA DII playoffs)	W 35–28	4,296	
December 14	at No. 2 Northwest Missouri State*	No. 22	Bearcat Stadium; Maryville, MO (NCAA DII semifinals)	L 13–27	4,096	
*Non-conference game; Rankings from AFCA Poll released prior to the game

== 2014 ==
2014 Grand Valley State Lakers football
- Conference: Great Lakes Intercollegiate Athletic Conference
- Record: 6–5 (6–4 GLIAC)
- Head coach: Matt Mitchell (5th season)
- Home stadium: Lubbers Stadium

2014 Great Lakes Intercollegiate Athletic Conference football standings
	Conf.			Overall
Team	W		L	W		L
No. 11 Ferris State $^	10	–	0	11	–	1
No. 4 Ohio Dominican ^	9	–	1	11	–	2
No. 21 Michigan Tech ^	9	–	1	9	–	2
Ashland	8	–	2	8	–	2
Wayne State (MI)	6	–	4	7	–	4
Grand Valley State	6	–	4	6	–	5
Findlay	4	–	6	5	–	6
Northwood	4	–	6	5	–	6
Tiffin	4	–	6	5	–	6
Hillsdale	4	–	6	4	–	7
Lake Erie	3	–	7	4	–	7
Walsh	3	–	7	4	–	7
Northern Michigan	2	–	8	3	–	8
Saginaw Valley State	2	–	8	2	–	9
Malone	1	–	9	1	–	10
$ – Conference champion; ^ – NCAA Division II playoff participant; Rankings from AFCA poll

The 2014 Grand Valley State Lakers football team represented Grand Valley State University as a member of the Great Lakes Intercollegiate Athletic Conference (GLIAC) during the 2014 NCAA Division II football season. In their fifth season under head coach Matt Mitchell, the Lakers compiled a 6–5 record (6–4 in conference games) and outscored opponents by a total of 322 to 266.

The team's statistical leaders included Heath Parling with 2,028 passing yards; Chris Robinson with 889 rushing yards; Jamie Potts with 54 receptions for 905 yards; kicker Joel Schipper with 64 points scored; and Deonte' Hurst with 92 total tackles.

=== Schedule ===
Date	Opponent	Site	Result	Attendance	Source
September 4	at No. 22 Azusa Pacific*	Citrus Stadium; Azusa, CA	L 23–26	6,199	
September 13	No. 10 Ohio Dominican	Lubbers Stadium; Allendale, MI	L 24–28	15,005	
September 20	at No. 16 Ferris State	Big Rapids, MI (Anchor-Bone Classic)	L 17–42	5,869	
September 27	Lake Erie	Lubbers Stadium; Allendale, MI	W 66–28	14,515	
October 4	at Hillsdale	Muddy Waters Stadium; Hillsdale, MI	W 42–21	1,966	
October 11	Wayne State (MI)	Lubbers Stadium; Allendale, MI	W 17–3	13,412	
October 18	at No. 20 Michigan Tech	Sherman Field; Houghton, MI	L 14–35	2,025	
October 25	at Findlay	Donnell Stadium; Findlay, OH	W 42–36	1,162	
November 1	No. 23 Ashland	Lubbers Stadium; Allendale, MI	L 14–37	8,011	
November 8	Tiffin	Lubbers Stadium; Allendale, MI	W 42–7	7,554	
November 15	at Saginaw Valley State	University Center, MI (Battle of the Valleys)	W 21–3	5,460	
*Non-conference game; Rankings from AFCA Poll released prior to the game

== 2015 ==
2015 Grand Valley State Lakers football

NCAA Division II semifinals, L 32–34 vs. Shepherd
- Conference: Great Lakes Intercollegiate Athletic Conference

Ranking
- AFCA: No. 4
- Record: 12–3 (8–2 GLIAC)
- Head coach: Matt Mitchell (6th season)
- Home stadium: Lubbers Stadium

2015 Great Lakes Intercollegiate Athletic Conference football standings
	Conf.			Overall
Team	W		L	W		L
No. 6 Ferris State +^	10	–	0	11	–	1
No. 10 Ashland +^	10	–	0	10	–	1
No. 4 Grand Valley State ^	8	–	2	12	–	3
Ohio Dominican	7	–	3	8	–	3
Michigan Tech	7	–	3	7	–	3
Findlay	5	–	5	6	–	5
Wayne State (MI)	5	–	5	6	–	5
Hillsdale	5	–	5	5	–	6
Northwood	5	–	5	5	–	6
Northern Michigan	4	–	6	5	–	6
Tiffin	4	–	6	5	–	6
Walsh	2	–	8	2	–	8
Lake Erie	2	–	8	2	–	9
Saginaw Valley State	1	–	9	1	–	10
Malone	0	–	10	0	–	10
$ – Conference champion; ^ – NCAA Division II playoff participant; Rankings from AFCA poll

The 2015 Grand Valley State Lakers football team represented Grand Valley State University as a member of the Great Lakes Intercollegiate Athletic Conference (GLIAC) during the 2015 NCAA Division II football season. In their sixth season under head coach Matt Mitchell, the Lakers compiled a 12–3 record (8–2 regular season, 8–2 in conference games), tied for second place in the GLIAC, and outscored opponents by a total of 576 to 402. They advanced to the NCAA Division II playoffs, defeating No. 3 Ashland, No. 2 Ferris State, and No. 4 CSU Pueblo before losing to No. 5 Shepherd in the semifinals.

Quarterback Bart Williams completed 273 of 480 passes (56.9%) for 4,206 yards, 45 touchdowns, 20 interceptions, and a 153.1 pass efficiency rating. Other statistical leaders included Kirk Spencer with 1,185 rushing yards; Matt Williams with 72 receptions for 1,357 yards; kicker Joel Schipper with 118 points scored; and David Talley with 128 total tackles.

=== Schedule ===
Date	Opponent	Rank	Site	Result	Attendance	Source
September 3	Southwest Baptist*	No. 24	Lubbers Stadium; Allendale, MI	W 36–28	11,124	
September 12	at No. 7 Ohio Dominican	No. 20	Columbus, OH	W 27–24	1,723	
September 19	No. 5 Ferris State	No. 14	Lubbers Stadium; Allendale, MI (Anchor-Bone Classic)	L 24–61	16,121	
September 26	at Lake Erie		Painesville, OH	W 65–23	760	
October 3	Hillsdale		Lubbers Stadium; Allendale, MI	W 46–14	12,552	
October 10	at Wayne State (MI)	No. 24	Tom Adams Field; Detroit, MI	W 38–17	5,377	
October 17	No. 9 Michigan Tech	No. 18	Lubbers Stadium; Allendale, MI	W 38–21	10,072	
October 24	Findlay	No. 12	Lubbers Stadium; Allendale, MI	W 52–7	11,367	
October 31	at No. 5 Ashland	No. 9	Ashland, OH	L 31–45	3,917	
November 7	at Tiffin	No. 17	Tiffin, OH	W 49–42	2,250	
November 14	Saginaw Valley State	No. 14	Lubbers Stadium; Allendale, MI (Battle of the Valleys)	W 24–17	12,951	
November 21	at No. 3 Ashland*	No. 12	Ashland, OH	W 45–28	3,812	
November 28	at No. 2 Ferris State*	No. 12	Big Rapids, MI	W 38–34	1,933	
December 5	at No. 4 CSU Pueblo*	No. 12	Pueblo, CO (NCAA DII quarterfinal)	W 31–7	4,325	
December 12	at No. 5 Shepherd*	No. 12	Ram Stadium; Shepherdstown, WV	L 32–34	6,496	
*Non-conference game; Rankings from AFCA Poll released prior to the game

== 2016 ==
2016 Grand Valley State Lakers football

GLIAC champion

NCAA Division II quarterfinals, L 32–47 vs. Ferris State
- Conference: Great Lakes Intercollegiate Athletic Conference

Ranking
- AFCA: No. 4
- Record: 12–1 (10–0 GLIAC)
- Head coach: Matt Mitchell (7th season)
- Home stadium: Lubbers Stadium

2016 Great Lakes Intercollegiate Athletic Conference football standings
	Conf.			Overall
Team	W		L	W		L
No. 4 Grand Valley State $^	10	–	0	12	–	1
No. 5 Ferris State ^	9	–	2	12	–	3
No. 19 Ashland	7	–	2	9	–	2
Tiffin	7	–	3	8	–	3
Ohio Dominican	7	–	4	7	–	4
Wayne State (MI)	7	–	4	7	–	4
Findlay	6	–	5	6	–	5
Saginaw Valley State	5	–	5	5	–	5
Hillsdale	4	–	5	5	–	5
Michigan Tech	4	–	6	4	–	6
Northern Michigan	3	–	7	3	–	8
Northwood	3	–	8	3	–	8
Walsh	0	–	10	1	–	10
Lake Erie	0	–	11	0	–	11
$ – Conference champion; ^ – NCAA Division II playoff participant; Rankings from AFCA poll

The 2016 Grand Valley State Lakers football team represented Grand Valley State University as a member of the Great Lakes Intercollegiate Athletic Conference (GLIAC) during the 2016 NCAA Division II football season. In their seventh season under head coach Matt Mitchell, the Lakers compiled a 12–1 record (11–0 regular season, 10–0 in conference games), won the GLIAC championship, and outscored opponents by a total of 524 to 275. They advanced to the NCAA Division II playoffs, defeating No. 8 Texas A&M Commerce before losing to No. 15 Ferris State in the quarterfinals.

Quarterback Bart Williams completed 202 of 331 passes (61.0%) for 3,334 yards, 33 touchdowns, 10 interceptions, and a 172.5 pass efficiency rating. Running back Marty Carter tallied 1,908 rushing yards on 256 carries (7.5 yards per carry) and scored 126 points on 21 touchdowns.

=== Schedule ===
Date	Opponent	Rank	Site	Result	Attendance	Source
September 1	Tiffin	No. 3	Lubbers Stadium; Allendale, MI	W 45–7	13,588	
September 10	Lake Erie	No. 3	Lubbers Stadium; Allendale, MI	W 55–7	14,688	
September 17	Northern Michigan	No. 2	Lubbers Stadium; Allendale, MI	W 50–24	16,236	
September 24	at Walsh	No. 2	North Canton, OH	W 38–0	1,160	
October 1	at Ohio Dominican	No. 2	Columbus, OH	W 24–21	1,756	
October 8	No. 14 Ferris State	No. 2	Lubbers Stadium; Allendale, MI (Anchor-Bone Classic)	W 35–23	16,889	
October 15	Truman State*	No. 2	Lubbers Stadium; Allendale, MI	W 41–3	13,635	
October 22	at Hillsdale	No. 2	Hillsdale, MI	W 35–17	1,887	
October 29	Findlay	No. 2	Lubbers Stadium; Allendale, MI	W 28–17	10,094	
November 5	at Saginaw Valley State	No. 2	University Center, MI (Battle of the Valleys)	W 62–56 ^{OT}	10,027	
November 12	at Wayne State (MI)	No. 2	Tom Adams Field; Detroit, MI	W 24–21	4,449	
November 26	No. 8 Texas A&M–Commerce*	No. 2	Lubbers Stadium; Allendale, MI (NCAA DII Super Region 4 semifinal)	W 55–32	3,081	
December 3	No. 15 Ferris State*	No. 2	Lubbers Stadium; Allendale, MI (NCAA DII quarterfinals)	L 32–47	12,177	
*Non-conference game; Rankings from AFCA Poll released prior to the game

== 2017 ==
2017 Grand Valley State Lakers football
- Conference: Great Lakes Intercollegiate Athletic Conference
- Record: 8–3 (7–2 GLIAC)
- Head coach: Matt Mitchell (8th season)
- Home stadium: Lubbers Stadium

2017 Great Lakes Intercollegiate Athletic Conference football standings
	Conf.			Overall
Team	W		L	W		L
No. 10 Ashland $^	9	–	0	11	–	2
No. 5 Ferris State ^	8	–	1	11	–	2
Grand Valley State	7	–	2	8	–	3
Tiffin	5	–	4	6	–	5
Northwood	5	–	4	7	–	4
Wayne State (MI)	4	–	5	5	–	6
Michigan Tech	3	–	6	4	–	7
Saginaw Valley State	3	–	6	5	–	6
Northern Michigan	1	–	8	1	–	9
Davenport *	0	–	9	1	–	10
$ – Conference champion; ^ – NCAA Division II playoff participant; * – Provisional Division II member; Rankings from AFCA poll

The 2017 Grand Valley State Lakers football team represented Grand Valley State University as a member of the Great Lakes Intercollegiate Athletic Conference (GLIAC) during the 2017 NCAA Division II football season. In their eighth season under head coach Matt Mitchell, the Lakers compiled an 8–3 record (7–2 in conference games), finished third in the GLIAC, and outscored opponents by a total of 411 to 143.

The team's statistical leaders included quarterback Bart Williams (2,305 passing yards), Marty Cater (931 rushing yards), Brandon Bean (68 receptions, 886 yards, 72 points scored), and Garrett Pougnet (82 total tackles).

=== Schedule ===
Date	Opponent	Rank	Site	Result	Attendance	Source
August 31	at Indianapolis*	No. 2	Key Stadium; Indianapolis, IN	L 20–24	5,553	
September 9	Davenport	No. 14	Lubbers Stadium; Allendale, MI	W 48–0	16,734	
September 16	at Michigan Tech	No. 12	Sherman Field; Houghton, MI	W 42–7	1,883	
September 23	Northwood	No. 12	Lubbers Stadium; Allendale, MI	W 49–0	13,659	
September 30	Saginaw Valley State	No. 9	Lubbers Stadium; Allendale, MI (Battle of the Valleys)	W 34–6	15,985	
October 7	at Wayne State (MI)	No. 8	Tom Adams Field; Detroit, MI	W 45–27	3,133	
October 14	at Truman State*	No. 7	Stokes Stadium; Kirksville, MO	W 42–7	3,467	
October 21	at No. 12 Ferris State	No. 7	Top Taggart Field; Big Rapids, MI (Anchor-Bone Classic)	L 27–28	7,489	
October 28	Northern Michigan^{†}	No. 19	Lubbers Stadium; Allendale, MI	W 28–3	12,075	
November 4	at No. 11 Ashland	No. 19	Jack Miller Stadium; Ashland, OH	L 31–34	3,581	
November 11	Tiffin		Lubbers Stadium; Allendale, MI	W 45–7	8,706	
*Non-conference game; ^{†}Homecoming; Rankings from AFCA Poll released prior to the game

== 2018 ==
2018 Grand Valley State Lakers football

NCAA Division II, first round, L 17-42 vs. Northwest Missouri State
- Conference: Great Lakes Intercollegiate Athletic Conference

Ranking
- AFCA: No. 14
- Record: 10–2 (7–1 GLIAC)
- Head coach: Matt Mitchell (9th season)
- Home stadium: Lubbers Stadium

2018 Great Lakes Intercollegiate Athletic Conference football standings
	Conf.			Overall
Team	W		L	W		L
No. 2 Ferris State $^	8	–	0	15	–	1
No. 14 Grand Valley State ^	7	–	1	10	–	2
Ashland	6	–	2	6	–	4
Saginaw Valley State	5	–	3	8	–	3
Davenport *	3	–	5	6	–	5
Northwood	3	–	5	3	–	7
Michigan Tech	2	–	6	4	–	6
Northern Michigan	1	–	7	3	–	8
Wayne State (MI)	1	–	7	2	–	9
$ – Conference champion; ^ – NCAA Division II playoff participant; * – Provisional Division II member; Rankings from AFCA poll

The 2018 Grand Valley State Lakers football team represented Grand Valley State University as a member of the Great Lakes Intercollegiate Athletic Conference (GLIAC) during the 2018 NCAA Division II football season. In their ninth season under head coach Matt Mitchell, the Lakers compiled a 10–2 record (7–1 in conference games), finished second in the GLIAC, and outscored opponents by a total of 393 to 229.

The team's statistical leaders included Bart Williams (2,556 passing yards), Chawntez Moss (1,028 rushing yards), Nick Dodson (985 receiving yards), kicker J.J. McGrath (81 points), and Tyler Bradfield (88 total tackles).

=== Schedule ===
Date	Opponent	Rank	Site	Result	Attendance	Source
August 30	No. 13 Indianapolis*	No. 10	Lubbers Stadium; Allendale, MI	W 30–7	13,068	
September 8	at Delta State*	No. 8	McCool Stadium; Cleveland, MS	W 21–10	5,514	
September 15	at Northern Michigan	No. 5	Superior Dome; Marquette, MI	W 47–14	2,042	
September 22	Michigan Tech	No. 5	Lubbers Stadium; Allendale, MI	W 45–20	16,671	
September 29	at Northwood	No. 3	Hantz Stadium; Midland, MI	W 52–7	2,103	
October 6	Dixie State*	No. 2	Lubbers Stadium; Allendale, MI	W 35–14	11,217	
October 13	No. 3 Ferris State	No. 2	Lubbers Stadium; Allendale, MI (Anchor-Bone Classic)	L 31–35	16,563	
October 20	at Davenport	No. 8	Farmers Insurance Athletic Complex; Caledonia Township, MI	W 19–14	2,400	
October 27	at Saginaw Valley State	No. 9	Wickes Stadium; University Center, MI (Battle of the Valleys)	W 31–28	6,751	
November 3	Ashland	No. 9	Lubbers Stadium; Allendale, MI	W 20–17	7,905	
November 10	Wayne State (MI)	No. 8	Lubbers Stadium; Allendale, MI	W 45–21	9,406	
November 17	No. 14 Northwest Missouri State*	No. 7	Lubbers Stadium; Allendale, MI (NCAA Division II, first round)	L 17–42	2,895	
*Non-conference game; Rankings from AFCA Poll released prior to the game

== 2019 ==
2019 Grand Valley State Lakers football
- Conference: Great Lakes Intercollegiate Athletic Conference
- Record: 8–3 (5–3 GLIAC)
- Head coach: Matt Mitchell (10th season)
- Home stadium: Lubbers Stadium

2019 Great Lakes Intercollegiate Athletic Conference football standings
	Conf.			Overall
Team	W		L	W		L
No. 3 Ferris State $^	8	–	0	12	–	1
Wayne State (MI)	7	–	1	8	–	3
Ashland	6	–	2	7	–	4
Grand Valley State	5	–	3	8	–	3
Davenport	3	–	5	5	–	5
Michigan Tech	3	–	5	5	–	5
Saginaw Valley State	3	–	5	5	–	6
Northwood	1	–	7	1	–	10
Northern Michigan	0	–	8	1	–	9
$ – Conference champion; ^ – NCAA Division II playoff participant; Rankings from AFCA poll

The 2019 Grand Valley State Lakers football team represented Grand Valley State University as a member of the Great Lakes Intercollegiate Athletic Conference (GLIAC) during the 2019 NCAA Division II football season. In their tenth season under head coach Matt Mitchell, the Lakers compiled an 8–3 record (5–3 in conference games), finished fourth in the GLIAC, and outscored opponents by a total of 331 to 187.

The team's statistical leaders included Cole Kotopka (1,716 passing yards), Aryuan Cain-Veasey (737 rushing yards), Austin Paritee (625 receiving yards), kicker Josh Gorball (58 points), and Isaiah Nkansah (97 total tackles).

=== Schedule ===
Date	Time	Opponent	Rank	Site	TV	Result	Attendance	Source
September 7		Edinboro*	No. 12	Lubbers Stadium; Allendale, MI		W 35–10	14,552	
September 14	7:00 p.m.	Delta State*	No. 10	Lubbers Stadium; Allendale, MI	ESPN3	W 28–24	10,680	
September 21		at Northwood	No. 10	Hantz Stadium; Midland, MI		W 27–3	1,704	
September 28	1:00 p.m.	at Michigan Tech	No. 9	Sherman Field; Houghton, MI		W 21–16	2,649	
October 5		Ashland	No. 9	Lubbers Stadium; Allendale, MI		L 17–20	13,732	
October 12		Saginaw Valley State	No. 19	Lubbers Stadium; Allendale, MI (Battle of the Valleys)		W 35–28	13,180	
October 19	1:00 p.m.	at Northern Michigan	No. 17	Superior Dome; Marquette, MI		W 45–17	2,685	
October 26	7:05 p.m.	Davenport	No. 16	Lubbers Stadium; Allendale, MI		W 27–7	5,262	
November 2		William Jewell*	No. 16	Lubbers Stadium; Allendale, MI		W 63–10	6,223	
November 9		at No. 2 Ferris State	No. 14	Top Taggart Field; Big Rapids, MI (Anchor–Bone Classic)		L 16–21	7,948	
November 16	1:00 p.m.	Wayne State (MI)	No. 19	Lubbers Stadium; Allendale, MI		L 17–31	5,117	
*Non-conference game; Rankings from AFCA Poll released prior to the game; All times are in Eastern time
