= 2015 NCAA Division II football rankings =

The 2015 NCAA Division II football rankings are from the American Football Coaches Association (AFCA). This is for the 2015 season.

== Legend ==
	Increase in ranking
	Decrease in ranking
	Not ranked previous week
(#–#)	Win–loss record
(Italics)	Number of first place votes
т	Tied with team above or below also with this symbol

== American Football Coaches Association poll ==
	Preseason	Week 1 Sept 8	Week 2 Sept 15	Week 3 Sept 22	Week 4 Sept 29	Week 5 Oct 6	Week 6 Oct 13	Week 7 Oct 20	Week 8 Oct 27	Week 9 Nov 3	Week 10 Nov 10	Week 11 Nov 17	Week 12 Postseason	
1.	Minnesota State (9) (Note: In the actual printed polls, Minnesota State was listed as Minnesota State–Mankato)	Minnesota State (1–0) (24)	Minnesota State (2–0) (30)	Minnesota State (3–0) (29)	Minnesota State (4–0) (30)	Minnesota State (5–0) (30)	Minnesota State (6–0) (28)	Minnesota State (7–0) (27)	West Georgia (8–0) (25)	West Georgia (9–0) (25)	Northwest Missouri State (10–0) (29)	Northwest Missouri State (11–0) (30)	Northwest Missouri State (15–0) (32)	1.
2.	CSU Pueblo (16)	CSU Pueblo (1–0) (6)	West Georgia (2–0) (1)	West Georgia (3–0) (2)	West Georgia (4–0) (2)	West Georgia (5–0) (2)	West Georgia (6–0) (4)	West Georgia (7–0) (5)	Northwest Missouri State (8–0) (6)	Northwest Missouri State (9–0) (6)	Ferris State (9–0) (2)	Ferris State (10–0) (2)	Shepherd (13–1)	2.
3.	Minnesota–Duluth (3)	West Georgia (1–0) (1)	Northwest Missouri State (2–0) (1)	Northwest Missouri State (3–0) (1)	Northwest Missouri State (4–0)	Northwest Missouri State (5–0)	Northwest Missouri State (6–0)	Northwest Missouri State (7–0)	Ferris State (7–0) (1)	Ferris State (8–0) (1)	Ashland (10–0) (1)	Ashland (10–0)	West Georgia (12–2)	3.
4.	West Georgia (3)	Northwest Missouri State (1–0) (1)	Pittsburg State (2–0)	Ferris State (2–0)	Ferris State (3–0)	Ferris State (4–0)	Ferris State (5–0)	Ferris State (6–0)	CSU Pueblo (7–1)	CSU Pueblo (8–1)	CSU Pueblo (9–1)	CSU Pueblo (10–1)	Grand Valley State (12–3)	4.
5.	Northwest Missouri State (1)	Pittsburg State (1–0)	Ferris State (1–0)	Delta State (3–0)	Delta State (4–0)	Sioux Falls (5–0)	Sioux Falls (6–0)	Sioux Falls (7–0)	Ashland (8–0)	Ashland (9–0)	Shepherd (9–0)	Shepherd (10–0)	CSU Pueblo (12–2)	5.
6.	Ferris State	Ferris State (0–0)	Delta State (2–0)	Angelo State (3–0)	Angelo State (4–0)	North Alabama (4–0)	CSU Pueblo (5–1)	CSU Pueblo (6–1)	Shepherd (7–0)	Shepherd (8–0)	Minnesota State (9–1)	Minnesota State (10–1)	Ferris State (11–1)	6.
7.	Pittsburg State	Ohio Dominican (1–0)	Minnesota–Duluth (1–1)	Sioux Falls (3–0)	Sioux Falls (4–0)	CSU Pueblo (4–1)	Colorado Mines (6–0)	Colorado Mines (7–0)	Minnesota State (7–1)	Minnesota State (8–1)	West Georgia (9–1)	West Georgia (10–1)	Slippery Rock (12–2)	7.
8.	Ohio Dominican	Lenoir–Rhyne (1–0)	Angelo State (2–0)	North Alabama (2–0)	North Alabama (3–0)	Colorado Mines (5–0)	Ashland (6–0)	Ashland (7–0)	Texas A&M–Commerce (7–1)	Sioux Falls (8–1)	Henderson State (9–1)	Henderson State (10–1)	Emporia State (11–3)	8.
9.	Concord	Minnesota–Duluth (0–1)	Ouachita Baptist (2–0)	Valdosta State (2–0)	Valdosta State (3–0)	Ashland (5–0)	Shepherd (5–0)	Shepherd (6–0)	Grand Valley State (7–1)	Henderson State (8–1)	Slippery Rock (9–1)	Midwestern State (10–1)	Midwestern State (10–2)	9.
10.	Lenoir–Rhyne	Delta State (1–0)	North Alabama (2–0)	CSU Pueblo (2–1)	CSU Pueblo (3–1)	Shepherd (4–0)	Humboldt State (5–0)	Midwestern State (7–0)	Sioux Falls (7–1)	Slippery Rock (8–1)	Midwestern State (9–1)	Slippery Rock (10–1)	Ashland (10–1)	10.
11.	Bloomsburg	Ouachita Baptist (1–0)	Valdosta State (2–0)	Colorado Mines (3–0)	Colorado Mines (4–0)	Humboldt State (4–0)	Midwestern State (6–0)	Texas A&M–Commerce (6–1)	Henderson State (7–1)	Midwestern State (8–1)	Texas A&M–Commerce (8–2)	Humboldt State (9–1)	Tuskegee (10–3)	11.
12.	Ouachita Baptist	Angelo State (1–0)	Sioux Falls (2–0)	Harding (3–0)	Harding (4–0)	Midwestern State (5–0)	Michigan Tech (5–0)	Grand Valley State (6–1)	Colorado Mines (7–1)	Texas A&M–Commerce (7–2)	Humboldt State (8–1)	Grand Valley State (9–2)	Henderson State (11–2)	12.
13.	Angelo State	North Alabama (1–0)	CSU Pueblo (1–1)	Ashland (3–0)	Ashland (4–0)	Pittsburg State (4–1)	Emporia State (6–0)	North Alabama (5–1)	Slippery Rock (7–1)	Humboldt State (7–1)	Indianapolis (9–1)	Indianapolis (10–1)	Minnesota State (10–2)	13.
14.	Delta State	Valdosta State (1–0)	Grand Valley State (2–0)	Slippery Rock (3–0)	Shepherd (4–0)	Michigan Tech (4–0)	Texas A&M–Commerce (5–1)	Henderson State (6–1)	Midwestern State (7–1)	Emporia State (8–1)	Grand Valley State (8–2)	North Alabama (8–2)	Valdosta State (9–3)	14.
15.	North Alabama	Sioux Falls (1–0)	Colorado Mines (2–0)	Pittsburg State (2–1)	Pittsburg State (3–1)	Texas A&M–Commerce (4–1)	Delta State (5–1)	Slippery Rock (6–1)	Humboldt State (6–1)	Tuskegee (8–1)	North Alabama (7–2)	Charleston (10–1)	North Alabama (9–3)	15.
16.	Valdosta State	Colorado Mines (1–0)	Harding (2–0)	Shepherd (3–0)	Humboldt State (3–0)	Angelo State (4–1)	Lenoir–Rhyne (4–1)	Humboldt State (5–1)	Tuskegee (7–1)	Colorado Mesa (8–1)	Charleston (9–1)	Sioux Falls (9–2)	Humboldt State (10–2)	16.
17.	Sioux Falls	Azusa Pacific (1–0)	Ohio Dominican (1–1)	Humboldt State (3–0)	Tuskegee (4–0)	Delta State (4–1)	North Alabama (4–1)	Michigan Tech (5–1)	Emporia State (7–1)	Grand Valley State (7–2)	Sioux Falls (8–2)	Valdosta State (8–2)	Assumption (11–2)	17.
18.	Colorado Mines	Texas A&M–Commerce (1–0)	Slippery Rock (2–0)	Tuskegee (3–0)	Texas A&M–Commerce (3–1)	Emporia State (5–0)	Grand Valley State (5–1)	Tuskegee (6–1)	Minnesota–Duluth (6–2)	Indianapolis (8–1)	Valdosta State (7–2)	Emporia State (9–2)	Indianapolis (10–2)	18.
19.	Azusa Pacific	Harding (1–0)	Ashland (2–0)	Concord (2–1)	Michigan Tech (4–0)	Lenoir–Rhyne (4–1)	Henderson State (5–1)	Emporia State (6–1)	Colorado Mesa (7–1)	North Alabama (6–2)	Emporia State (8–2)	Assumption (10–1)	IUP (9–3) (Note: In the actual printed polls, IUP was listed as Indiana (PA))	19.
20.	Winston–Salem State	Grand Valley State (1–0)	Shepherd (2–0)	Texas A&M–Commerce (2–1)	Midwestern State (4–0)	Ouachita Baptist (4–1)	Slippery Rock (5–1)	Minnesota–Duluth (5–2)	Indianapolis (7–1)	Charleston (8–1)	Central Missouri (8–2)	Texas A&M–Commerce (8–3)	Charleston (10–2)	20.
21.	Harding	Slippery Rock (1–0)	Concord (1–1)	Michigan Tech (3–0)	Concord (3–1)	Valdosta State (3–1)	Minnesota–Duluth (4–2)	Wingate (6–1)	North Alabama (5–2)	Colorado Mines (7–2)	Colorado Mesa (8–2)	Colorado Mesa (9–2)	Carson–Newman (9–3)	21.
22.	Texas A&M–Commerce	Concord (0–1)	Texas A&M–Commerce (1–1)	Lenoir–Rhyne (2–1)	Lenoir–Rhyne (3–1)	Harding (4–1)	Pittsburg State (4–2)	Delta State (5–2)	Michigan Tech (5–2)	Michigan Tech (6–2)	Bowie State (9–1)	Carson–Newman (9–2)	Sioux Falls (9–3)	22.
23.	West Chester	Indianapolis (1–0)	Lenoir–Rhyne (1–1)	Midwestern State (3–0)	Emporia State (4–0)	Wingate (5–0)	Tuskegee (5–1)	Colorado Mesa (6–1)	Charleston (7–1)	Valdosta State (6–2)	Assumption (9–1)	Tuskegee (8–2)	Texas A&M–Commerce (8–4)	23.
24.	Grand Valley State	Ashland (1–0)	Tuskegee (2–0)	Ouachita Baptist (2–1)	Ouachita Baptist (3–1)	Grand Valley State (4–1)	Arkansas Tech (5–1)	Angelo State (5–2)	Valdosta State (5–2)	Central Missouri (7–2)	Tuskegee (8–2)	Augustana (SD) (9–2)	Augustana (SD) (9–3)	24.
25.	Slippery Rock	Shepherd (1–0)	Humboldt State (2–0)	Minnesota–Duluth (1–2)	Minnesota–Duluth (2–2)	Minnesota–Duluth (3–2)	Angelo State (4–2)	Clarion (7–0)	Central Missouri (6–2)	Bowie State (8–1)	Carson–Newman (8–2)	Catawba (9–2)	Catawba (9–3)	25.
	Preseason	Week 1 Sept 8	Week 2 Sept 15	Week 3 Sept 22	Week 4 Sept 29	Week 5 Oct 6	Week 6 Oct 13	Week 7 Oct 20	Week 8 Oct 27	Week 9 Nov 3	Week 10 Nov 10	Week 11 Nov 17	Week 12 Postseason	
		Dropped: 11 Bloomsburg; 20 Winston–Salem State; 23 West Chester	Dropped: 17 Azusa Pacific; 23 Indianapolis	Dropped: 14 Grand Valley State; 17 Ohio Dominican	Dropped: 14 Slippery Rock	Dropped: 17 Tuskegee; 21 Concord	Dropped: 20 Ouachita Baptist; 21 Valdosta State; 22 Harding; 23 Wingate	Dropped: 16 Lenoir–Rhyne; 22 Pittsburg State; 24 Arkansas Tech	Dropped: 21 Wingate; 22 Delta State; 24 Angelo State; 25 Clarion	Dropped: 18 Minnesota–Duluth	Dropped: 21 Colorado Mines; 22 Michigan Tech	Dropped: 20 Central Missouri; 22 Bowie State	Dropped: 21 Colorado Mesa	
