= 2011 Little All-America college football team =

American college football all-star team

The 2011 Little All-America college football team is composed of college football players from Division II, III, and NAIA schools who were selected by the Associated Press (AP) as the best players at each position.

== First team ==
Position	Player	Team
Offense
Quarterback	Dane Simoneau	Washburn
Running back	Jonas Randolph	Mars Hill
Running back	Joe Glendening	Hillsdale
Running back	Levell Coppage	Wisconsin–Whitewater
Wide receiver	Trey McVay	Northeastern State
Wide receiver	Trevor Kennedy	Mercyhurst
Offensive line	Joe Long	Wayne State
Offensive line	Amini Silatolu	Midwestern State
Offensive line	Darrell Leopold	Delta State
Offensive line	Alex Smith	Salisbury
Offensive line	Kyle Thornton	North Alabama
Defense
Defensive line	Todd Storm	Michigan Tech
Defensive line	Aston Whiteside	Abilene Christian
Defensive line	Chris Mayes	Wesley
Defensive line	Tim Green	Lincoln (PA)
Linebacker	Nate Dreiling	Pittsburg State
Linebacker	Chad Kilgore	Northwest Missouri
Linebacker	Jamarkus Gaskins	Albany State
Defensive back	Rontez Miles	California (PA)
Defensive back	Jeremy Jones	Wayne State
Defensive back	Alton Keaton	Winston–Salem
Defensive back	Nick Driskell	Mount Union
Special Teams
Kicker	Greg Zuerlein	Missouri Western
Punter	Randy Weich	Wayne State
All-purpose	Jonathan Woodson	Texas A&M–Kingsville

== See also ==
- 2011 College Football All-America Team
