= 2012 NFL draft =

Selection of American football players

General information
- Date: April 26–28, 2012
- Time: 8:00 p.m. EDT (April 26); 7:00 p.m. EDT (April 27); Noon EDT (April 28)
- Location: Radio City Music Hall in New York City, New York
- Networks: ESPN, NFL Network

Overview
- 253 total selections in 7 rounds
- League: NFL
- First selection: Andrew Luck, QB; Indianapolis Colts
- Mr. Irrelevant: Chandler Harnish, QB; Indianapolis Colts
- Most selections (11): Cleveland Browns
- Fewest selections (5): New Orleans Saints
- Hall of Famers: 1: LB Luke Kuechly

The 2012 NFL draft was the 77th annual meeting of National Football League (NFL) franchises to select newly eligible American football players for their rosters. The draft, which is officially called the "NFL Player Selection Meeting", was held at Radio City Music Hall in New York City from April 26 to April 28, 2012. There were 253 draft selections: 221 regular selections and 32 compensatory selections. The Indianapolis Colts, who compiled the league's worst season in 2011 with a 2–14 record, had the right to the first selection. A record 26 prospects attended the draft in person.

Quarterback prospect Andrew Luck received significant attention in the weeks preceding the draft. On April 17, Indianapolis general manager Ryan Grigson announced that the team would take Luck as their first-overall pick after releasing longtime starting quarterback Peyton Manning, saying it was "the right thing to do" in anticipation of the "media gauntlet" Luck would face in the days leading up to the draft. Luck was highly touted as one of the best quarterback prospects in years and widely regarded as the top overall prospect in the draft. As a result, he had been the subject of the "Suck for Luck" campaigns by fans, who hoped that their teams would end up with the worst record in the 2011 season so they would have the chance to draft him. He was successful with the Colts, but dealt with several injuries throughout his career and decided to retire in 2019 while still in his prime, after winning the NFL Comeback Player of the Year Award. Heisman Trophy-winning quarterback Robert Griffin III was the subject of another major story in the draft. He was selected second overall by the Washington Redskins and had a breakout rookie season en route to winning that year's NFL Offensive Rookie of the Year Award; however, Griffin suffered an injury during the postseason that same year and struggled to show the same level of play thereafter; Griffin was released by the Redskins after the 2015 season.

The draft was highly regarded for its quarterback talent, with six out of the eleven quarterbacks selected (Luck, Griffin, Ryan Tannehill, Russell Wilson, Nick Foles and Kirk Cousins) selected to at least one Pro Bowl. Tannehill and Foles both had a season in which they led the NFL in passer rating; Foles was also named MVP of Super Bowl LII. As of 2022, Cousins is ranked in the top ten in career passer rating and completion percentage. Wilson was the most successful quarterback of the draft, making nine Pro Bowls and leading the Seahawks to their first Super Bowl victory. The draft also had several notable quarterbacks who are now regarded as draft busts. There were two players drafted in 2012 at 28 years old. Brandon Weeden became the oldest first-round selection in NFL history at 28 years old when he was selected by the Cleveland Browns, but left the team after two seasons. Jeris Pendleton became the oldest seventh-round selection in NFL history at 28 years old when he was selected by the Jacksonville Jaguars, but he left the team after one season. Brock Osweiler and Ryan Lindley also had largely unsuccessful careers in the NFL. A rare occurrence happened when the first and final picks in the draft were both quarterbacks and were taken by the same team; Chandler Harnish was chosen with the final pick of the draft by the Colts, causing him to be dubbed Mr. Irrelevant for 2012. Besides its quarterbacks, the draft overall is considered one of the best of all-time with numerous prospects showing Hall of Fame talent throughout their careers, including Defensive Player of the Year winners Luke Kuechly and Stephon Gilmore, along with perennial Pro Bowlers Lavonte David, Harrison Smith, Bobby Wagner, Fletcher Cox, T. Y. Hilton, Chandler Jones, Johnny Hekker and Justin Tucker.

== Early entrants ==
A record 65 non-seniors announced their intention to forgo their remaining NCAA eligibility and declare themselves eligible to be selected. Of the 65, 44 (or 67.7%) were drafted.

The selection of Luck, a junior, marked the fourth straight draft where the first overall selection was not a senior. Prior to the 2012 draft, six out of the previous seven first-overall draft selections had been players who had entered the draft early. Eight of the first 10 players chosen in this draft were non-seniors, which matched the record set in the previous draft. Mark Barron and Ryan Tannehill were the only two seniors among the first 10 draftees.

== Player selections ==
The following is the breakdown of the 253 players selected by position:

- 33 linebackers
- 33 wide receivers
- 31 cornerbacks
- 22 defensive tackles
- 21 defensive ends
- 21 guards
- 19 running backs
- 19 offensive tackles
- 19 safeties
- 11 quarterbacks
- 11 tight ends
- 4 centers
- 4 placekickers
- 2 fullbacks
- 2 punters
- 1 nose tackle

== Draft selections ==
Player selections legend

*	compensatory selection
^	supplemental compensatory selection
†	Pro Bowler (Note: Players are identified as a Pro Bowler if they were selected for the Pro Bowl at any time in their career.)

Positions key
Offense	Defense	Special teams
QB — Quarterback; RB — Running back; FB — Fullback; WR — Wide receiver; TE — Tight end; OL — Offensive lineman; T — Tackle; G — Guard; C — Center	DL — Defensive lineman; DT — Defensive tackle (Note: Includes nose tackle (NT)); DE — Defensive end; EDGE — Edge rusher; LB — Linebacker (Note: Includes middle linebacker (MLB/MIKE), weakside linebacker (WILL), strongside linebacker (SAM), off-ball linebacker, and outside linebacker (OLB)); DB — Defensive back; CB — Cornerback; S — Safety (Note: Includes free safety (FS) and strong safety (SS))	K — Kicker (Note: Also known as a placekicker (PK)); P — Punter; LS — Long snapper; RS — Return specialist (Note: Includes kickoff and punt returners)

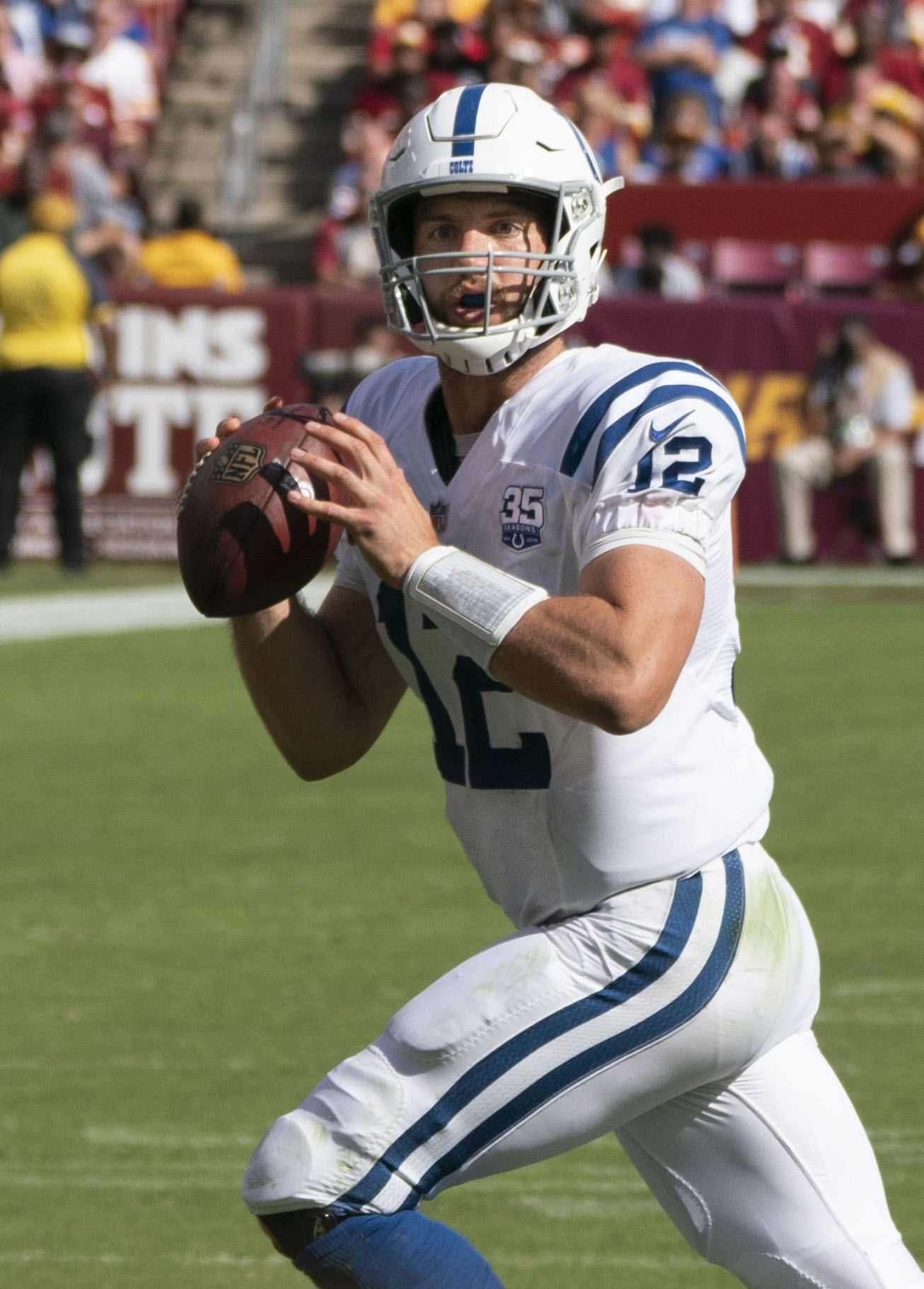
Andrew Luck was selected first overall by the Indianapolis Colts.

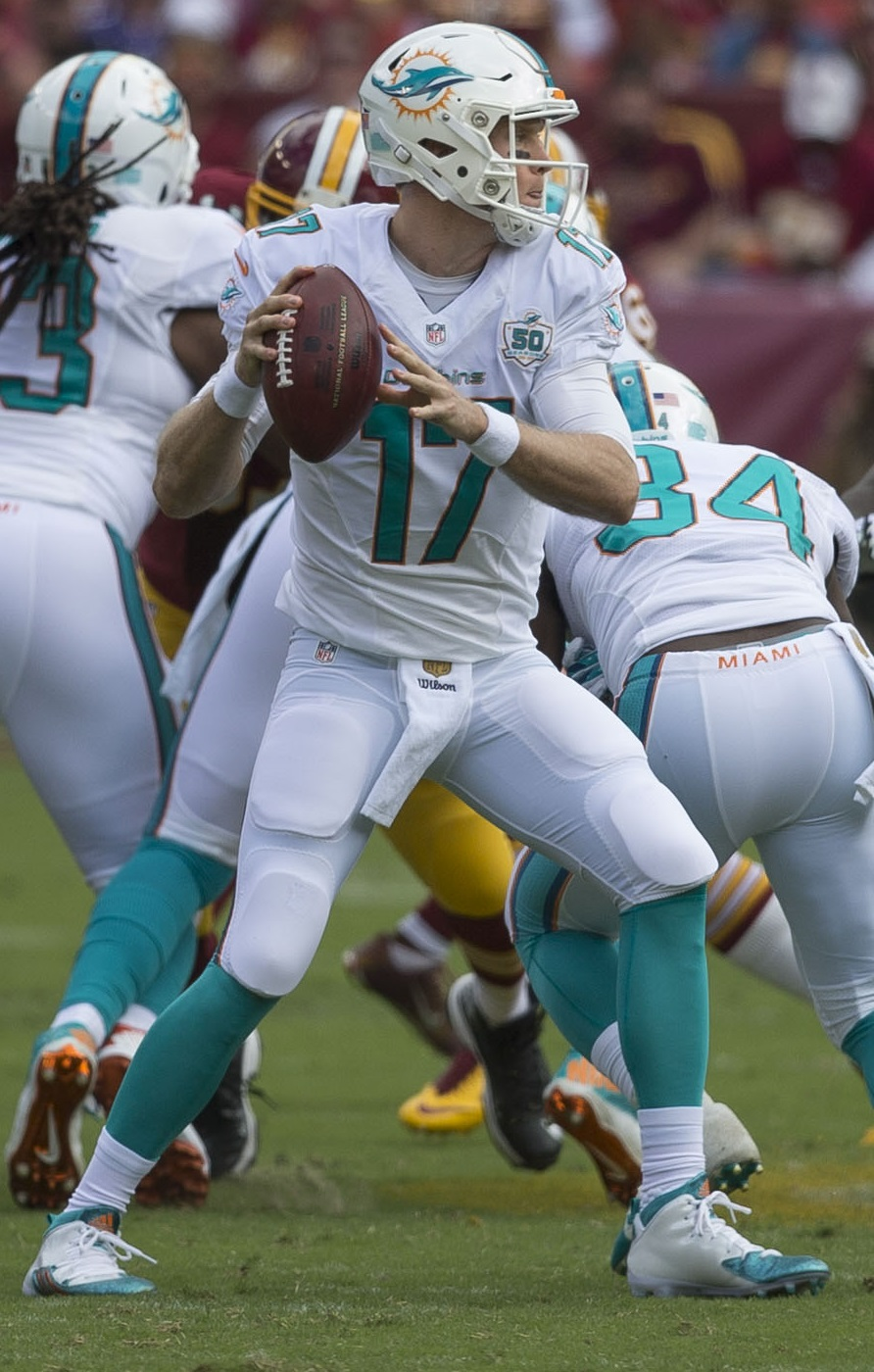
Ryan Tannehill was selected eighth-overall by the Miami Dolphins.

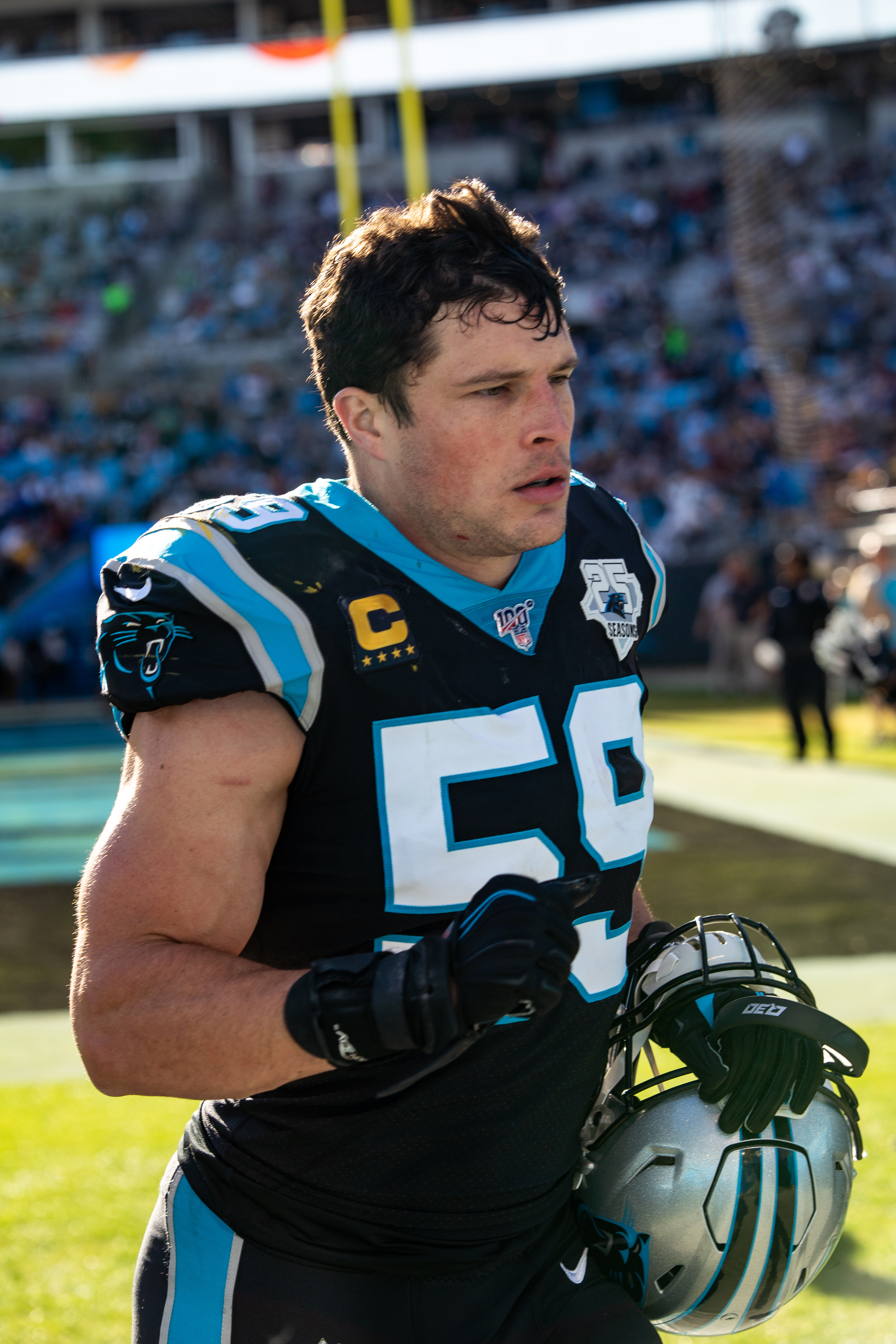

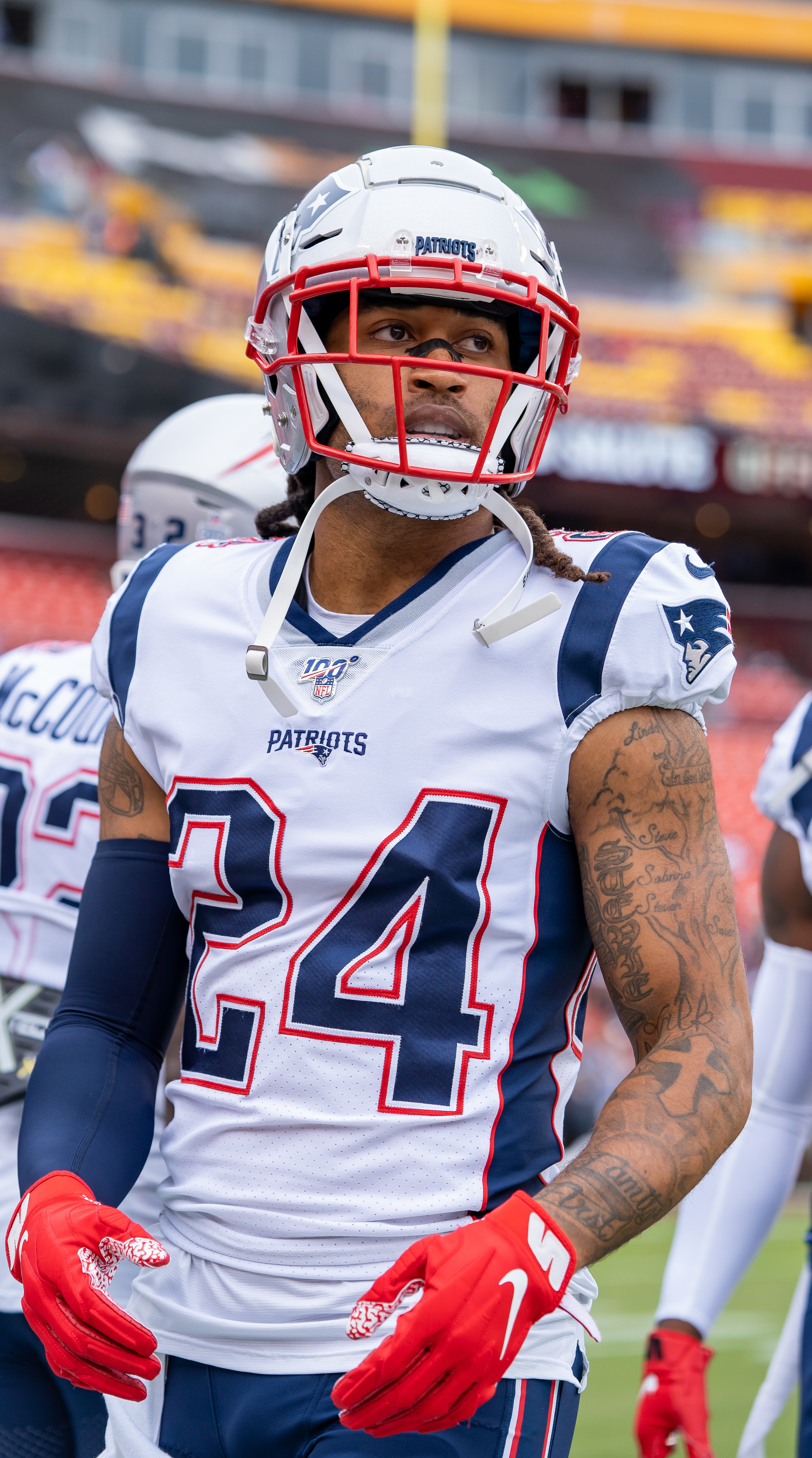
NFL Hall of Fame linebacker Luke Kuechly and cornerback Stephon Gilmore were selected with the ninth and tenth-overall picks in the first round, and would both go on to earn Defensive Player of the Year honors.

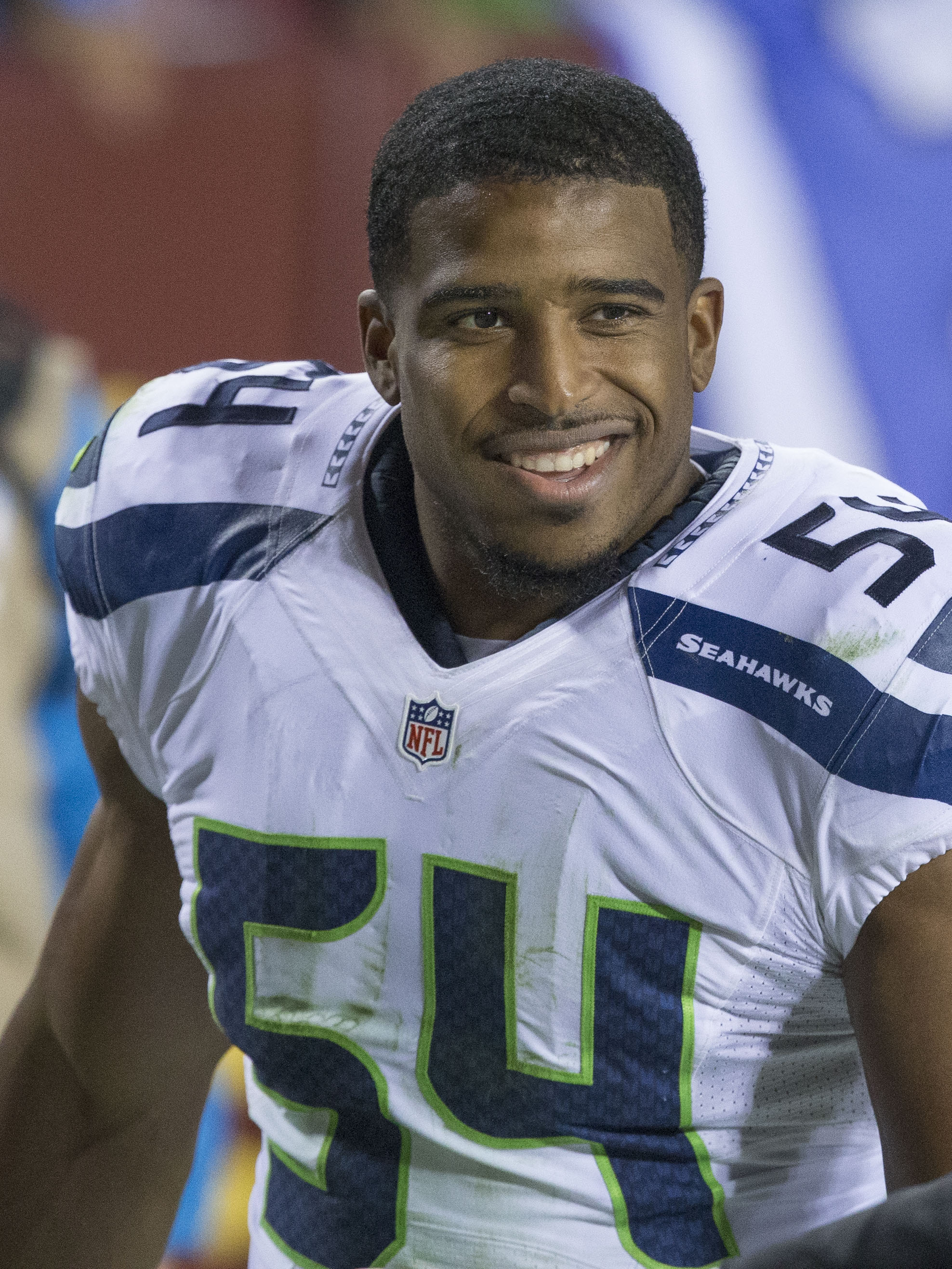
Bobby Wagner was selected 47th overall by the Seattle Seahawks.

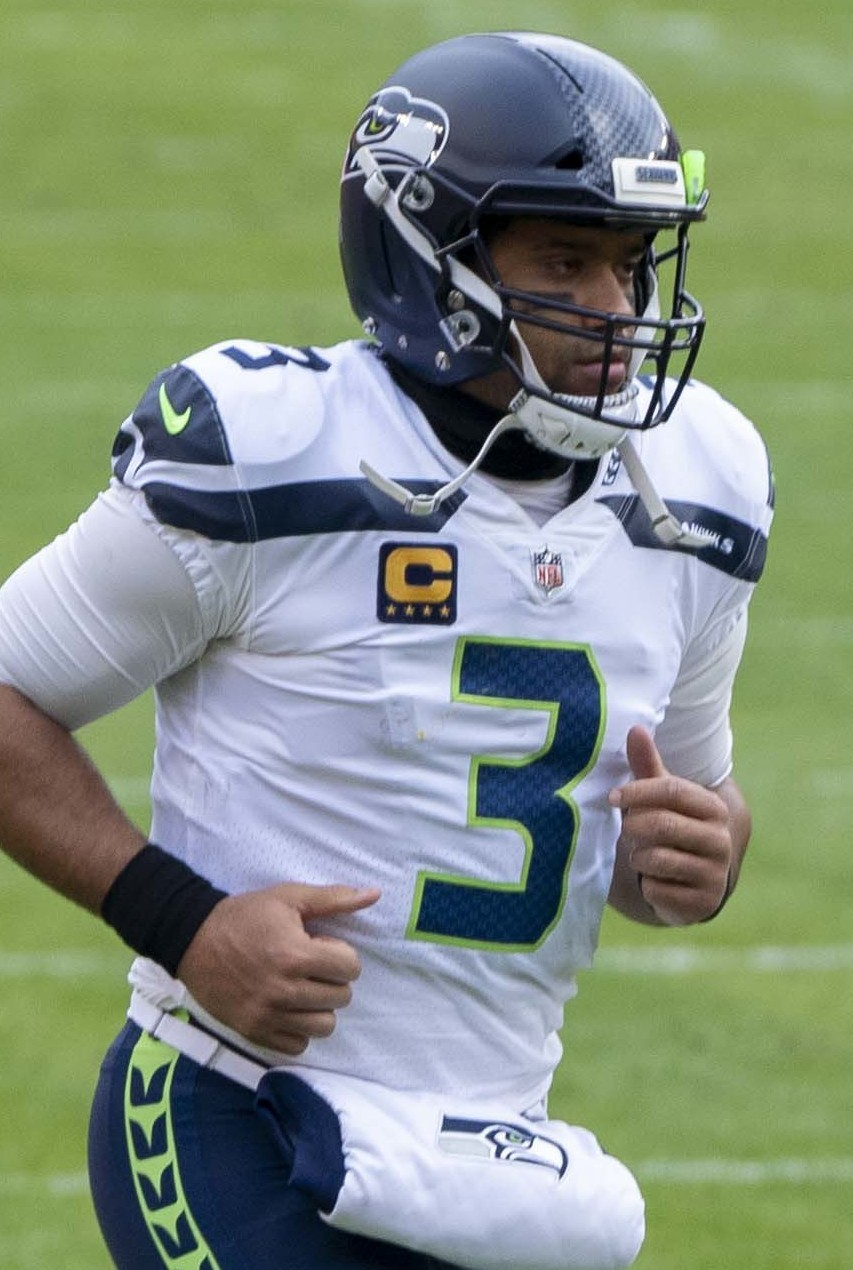
Russell Wilson was selected in the third round 75th overall by the Seattle Seahawks.

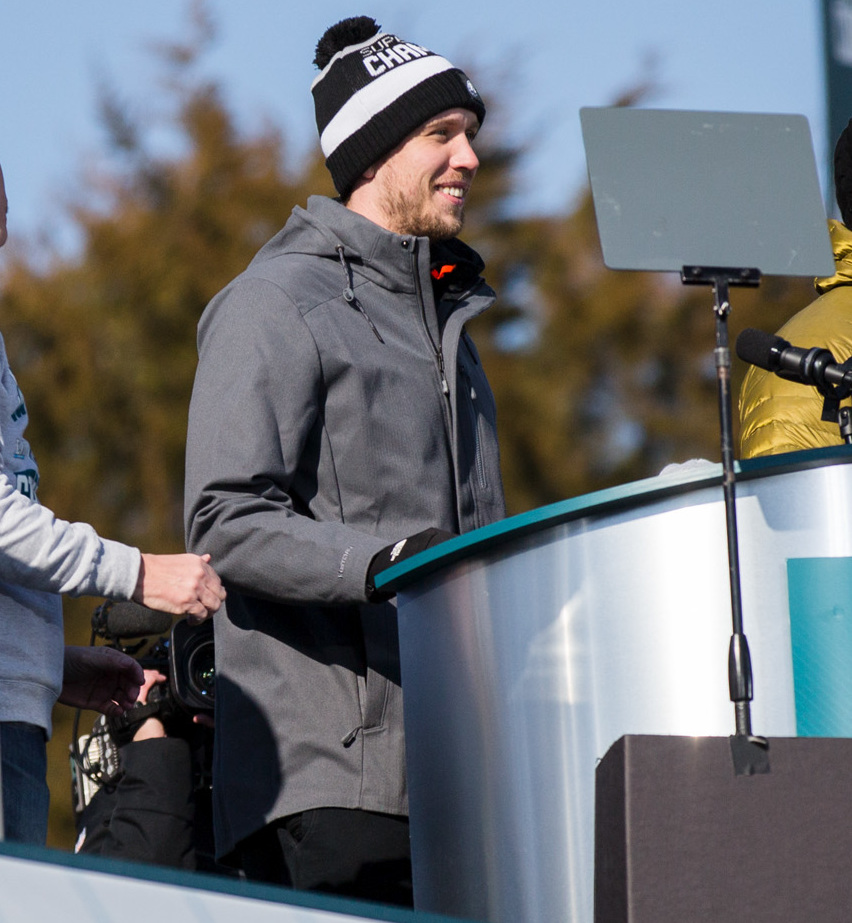
Super Bowl LII MVP Nick Foles was selected 88th overall by the Philadelphia Eagles.

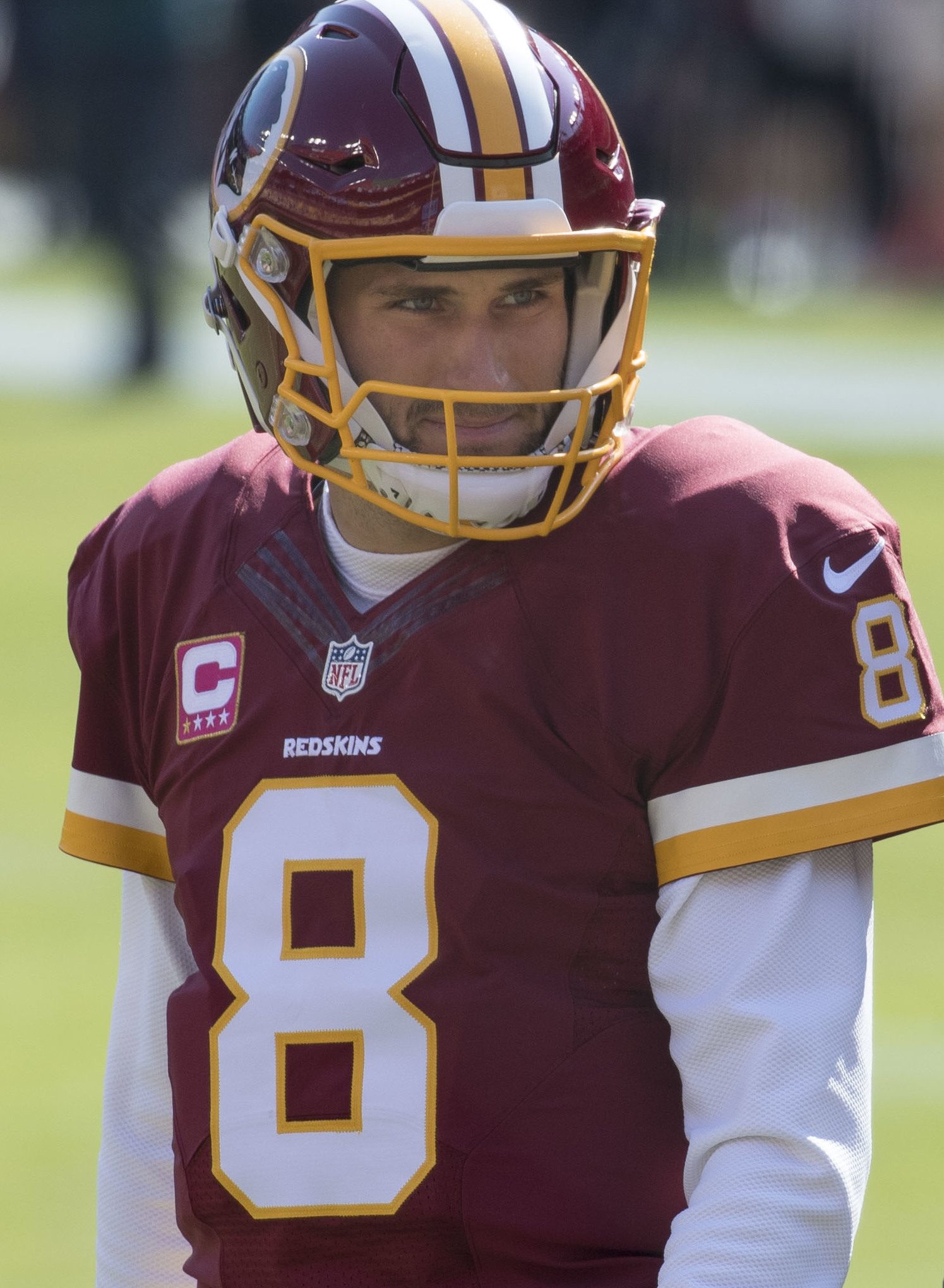
Kirk Cousins was selected in the fourth-round 102nd overall by the Washington Redskins.

The draft was held between April 26 through April 28, 2012.

2012 NFL Draft selections
Rnd.	Pick	Team	Player	Pos.	College	Notes
1	1	Indianapolis Colts	Andrew Luck ^{†}	QB	Stanford	
1	2	Washington Redskins	Robert Griffin III ^{†}	QB	Baylor	from St. Louis; (Note: No. 2: St. Louis → Washington (PD). St. Louis traded a first-round selection (2nd overall) to Washington in exchange for first- and second-round selections (6th and 39th overall), a 2013 first-round selection and a 2014 first-round selection.); 2011 Heisman Trophy winner (Note: Robert Griffin III was the 2011 winner of the Heisman Trophy which is awarded annually to the player deemed the most outstanding player in collegiate football.)
1	3	Cleveland Browns	Trent Richardson	RB	Alabama	from Minnesota (Note: No. 3: Minnesota → Cleveland (PD). Minnesota traded a first-round selection (3rd overall) to Cleveland in exchange for first-, fourth-, fifth- and seventh-round selections (4th, 118th, 139th and 211th overall).)
1	4	Minnesota Vikings	Matt Kalil ^{†}	T	USC	from Cleveland (Note: No. 4: Cleveland → Minnesota (PD). See Round 1: Minnesota → Cleveland.)
1	5	Jacksonville Jaguars	Justin Blackmon	WR	Oklahoma State	from Tampa Bay (Note: No. 5: Tampa Bay → Jacksonville (D). Tampa Bay traded a first-round selection (5th overall) to Jacksonville in exchange for first- and fourth-round selections (7th and 101st overall).)
1	6	Dallas Cowboys	Morris Claiborne	CB	LSU	from Washington via St. Louis (Note: No. 6: Washington → St. Louis → Dallas. Multiple trades: Washington → St. Louis (PD). See Round 1: St. Louis → Washington. St. Louis → Dallas (D). St. Louis traded a first-round selection (6th overall) to Dallas in exchange for first- and second-round selections (14th and 45th overall).)
1	7	Tampa Bay Buccaneers	Mark Barron	S	Alabama	from Jacksonville (Note: No. 7: Jacksonville → Tampa Bay (D). See Round 1: Tampa Bay → Jacksonville.)
1	8	Miami Dolphins	Ryan Tannehill ^{†}	QB	Texas A&M	
1	9	Carolina Panthers	Luke Kuechly^{‡}^{†}	LB	Boston College	
1	10	Buffalo Bills	Stephon Gilmore ^{†}	CB	South Carolina	
1	11	Kansas City Chiefs	Dontari Poe ^{†}	DT	Memphis	
1	12	Philadelphia Eagles	Fletcher Cox ^{†}	DT	Mississippi State	from Seattle (Note: No. 12: Seattle → Philadelphia (D). Seattle traded a first-round selection (12th overall) to Philadelphia in exchange for first-, fourth- and sixth-round selections (15th, 114th and 172nd overall).)
1	13	Arizona Cardinals	Michael Floyd	WR	Notre Dame	
1	14	St. Louis Rams	Michael Brockers	DE	LSU	from Dallas (Note: No. 14: Dallas → St. Louis (D). See Round 1: St. Louis → Dallas.)
1	15	Seattle Seahawks	Bruce Irvin	DE	West Virginia	from Philadelphia (Note: No. 15: Philadelphia → Seattle (D). See Round 1: Seattle → Philadelphia.)
1	16	New York Jets	Quinton Coples	DE	North Carolina	
1	17	Cincinnati Bengals	Dre Kirkpatrick	CB	Alabama	from Oakland (Note: No. 17: Oakland → Cincinnati (PD). Oakland traded a first-round selection (17th overall) and a conditional 2013 second-round selection to Cincinnati in exchange for QB Carson Palmer. The 2013 selection would have become a first-rounder if Oakland had made it to the 2012–13 AFC Championship game.)
1	18	San Diego Chargers	Melvin Ingram ^{†}	LB	South Carolina	
1	19	Chicago Bears	Shea McClellin	DE	Boise State	
1	20	Tennessee Titans	Kendall Wright	WR	Baylor	
1	21	New England Patriots	Chandler Jones ^{†}	DE	Syracuse	from Cincinnati (Note: No. 21: Cincinnati → New England (D). Cincinnati traded a first-round selection (21st overall) to New England in exchange for first- and third-round selections (27th and 93rd overall).)
1	22	Cleveland Browns	Brandon Weeden	QB	Oklahoma State	from Atlanta (Note: No. 22: Atlanta → Cleveland (PD). Atlanta traded first- and fourth-round selections (22nd and 118th overall), and 2011 first-, second- and fourth-round selections to Cleveland in exchange for a 2011 first-round selection.)
1	23	Detroit Lions	Riley Reiff	T	Iowa	
1	24	Pittsburgh Steelers	David DeCastro ^{†}	G	Stanford	
1	25	New England Patriots	Dont'a Hightower ^{†}	LB	Alabama	from Denver (Note: No. 25: Denver → New England (D). Denver traded a first-round selection (25th overall) to New England in exchange for first- and fourth-round selections (31st and 126th overall).)
1	26	Houston Texans	Whitney Mercilus	DE	Illinois	
1	27	Cincinnati Bengals	Kevin Zeitler ^{†}	G	Wisconsin	from New Orleans via New England (Note: No. 27: New Orleans → New England → Cincinnati. Multiple trades: New Orleans → New England (PD). New Orleans traded a first-round selection (27th overall) and a 2011 second-round selection to New England in exchange for a 2011 first-round selection. New England → Cincinnati (D). See Round 1: Cincinnati → New England.)
1	28	Green Bay Packers	Nick Perry	LB	USC	
1	29	Minnesota Vikings	Harrison Smith ^{†}	S	Notre Dame	from Baltimore (Note: No. 29: Baltimore → Minnesota (D). Baltimore traded a first-round selection (29th overall) to Minnesota in exchange for second- and fourth-round selections (35th and 98th overall).)
1	30	San Francisco 49ers	A. J. Jenkins	WR	Illinois	
1	31	Tampa Bay Buccaneers	Doug Martin ^{†}	RB	Boise State	from New England via Denver (Note: No. 31: New England → Denver → Tampa Bay. Multiple trades: New England → Denver (D). See Round 1: Denver → New England. Denver → Tampa Bay (D). Denver traded first- and fourth-round selections (31st and 126th overall) to Tampa Bay in exchange for second- and fourth-round selections (36th and 101st overall).)
1	32	New York Giants	David Wilson	RB	Virginia Tech	
2	33	St. Louis Rams	Brian Quick	WR	Appalachian State	
2	34	Indianapolis Colts	Coby Fleener	TE	Stanford	
2	35	Baltimore Ravens	Courtney Upshaw	LB	Alabama	from Minnesota (Note: No. 35: Minnesota → Baltimore (D). See Round 1: Baltimore → Minnesota.)
2	36	Denver Broncos	Derek Wolfe	DT	Cincinnati	from Tampa Bay (Note: No. 36: Tampa Bay → Denver (D). See Round 1: Denver → Tampa Bay.)
2	37	Cleveland Browns	Mitchell Schwartz ^{†}	T	California	
2	38	Jacksonville Jaguars	Andre Branch	DE	Clemson	
2	39	St. Louis Rams	Janoris Jenkins ^{†}	CB	North Alabama	from Washington (Note: No. 39: Washington → St. Louis (PD). See Round 1: St. Louis → Washington.)
2	40	Carolina Panthers	Amini Silatolu	G	Midwestern State	
2	41	Buffalo Bills	Cordy Glenn	T	Georgia	
2	42	Miami Dolphins	Jonathan Martin	T	Stanford	
2	43	New York Jets	Stephen Hill	WR	Georgia Tech	from Seattle (Note: No. 43: Seattle → NY Jets (D). Seattle traded a second-round selection (43rd overall) to the NY Jets in exchange for second-, fifth- and seventh-round selections (47th, 154th and 232nd overall).)
2	44	Kansas City Chiefs	Jeff Allen	G	Illinois	
2	45	Chicago Bears	Alshon Jeffery ^{†}	WR	South Carolina	from Dallas via St. Louis (Note: No. 45: Dallas → St. Louis → Chicago. Multiple trades: Dallas → St. Louis (D). See Round 1: St. Louis → Dallas. St. Louis → Chicago (D). St. Louis traded a second-round selection (45th overall) to Chicago in exchange for second- and fifth-round selections (50th and 150th overall).)
2	46	Philadelphia Eagles	Mychal Kendricks	LB	California	
2	47	Seattle Seahawks	Bobby Wagner ^{†}	LB	Utah State	from NY Jets (Note: No. 47: NY Jets → Seattle (D). See Round 2: Seattle → NY Jets.)
2	48	New England Patriots	Tavon Wilson	S	Illinois	from Oakland (Note: No. 48: Oakland → New England (PD). Oakland traded a second-round selection (48th overall) and a 2011 seventh-round selection to New England in exchange for 2011 third- and fourth-round selections.)
2	49	San Diego Chargers	Kendall Reyes	DT	Connecticut	
2	50	St. Louis Rams	Isaiah Pead	RB	Cincinnati	from Chicago (Note: No. 50: Chicago → St. Louis (D). See Round 2: St. Louis → Chicago.)
2	51	Green Bay Packers	Jerel Worthy	DT	Michigan State	from Arizona via Philadelphia (Note: No. 51: Arizona → Philadelphia → Green Bay. Multiple trades: Arizona → Philadelphia (PD). Arizona traded a second-round selection (51st overall) and CB Dominique Rodgers-Cromartie to Philadelphia in exchange for QB Kevin Kolb. Philadelphia → Green Bay (D). Philadelphia traded a second-round selection (51st overall) to Green Bay in exchange for second- and fourth-round selections (59th and 123rd overall).)
2	52	Tennessee Titans	Zach Brown ^{†}	LB	North Carolina	
2	53	Cincinnati Bengals	Devon Still	DT	Penn State	
2	54	Detroit Lions	Ryan Broyles	WR	Oklahoma	
2	55	Atlanta Falcons	Peter Konz	C	Wisconsin	
2	56	Pittsburgh Steelers	Mike Adams	T	Ohio State	
2	57	Denver Broncos	Brock Osweiler	QB	Arizona State	
2	58	Tampa Bay Buccaneers	Lavonte David ^{†}	LB	Nebraska	from Houston (Note: No. 58: Houston → Tampa Bay (D). Houston traded second- and seventh-round selections (58th and 233rd overall) to Tampa Bay in exchange for third- and fourth-round selections (68th and 126th overall).)
2	–	New Orleans Saints	selection forfeited (Note: New Orleans forfeited its second-round selection as well as a 2013 second-round selection as part of the punishment for the team's bounty scandal.)			
2	59	Philadelphia Eagles	Vinny Curry	DE	Marshall	from Green Bay (Note: No. 59: Green Bay → Philadelphia (D). See Round 2: Philadelphia → Green Bay.)
2	60	Baltimore Ravens	Kelechi Osemele ^{†}	G	Iowa State	
2	61	San Francisco 49ers	LaMichael James	RB	Oregon	
2	62	Green Bay Packers	Casey Hayward ^{†}	CB	Vanderbilt	from New England (Note: No. 62: New England → Green Bay (D). New England traded a second-round selection (62nd overall) to Green Bay in exchange for third- and fifth-round selections (90th and 163rd overall). (Note: "Packers trade up again, draft Vanderbilt's Casey Hayward". Green Bay Press Gazette. April 27, 2012.))
2	63	New York Giants	Rueben Randle	WR	LSU	
3	64	Indianapolis Colts	Dwayne Allen	TE	Clemson	
3	65	St. Louis Rams	Trumaine Johnson	CB	Montana	
3	66	Minnesota Vikings	Josh Robinson	CB	UCF	
3	67	Denver Broncos	Ronnie Hillman	RB	San Diego State	from Cleveland (Note: No. 67: Cleveland → Denver (D). Cleveland traded a third-round selection (67th overall) to Denver in exchange for third- and fourth-round selections (87th and 120th overall).)
3	68	Houston Texans	DeVier Posey	WR	Ohio State	from Tampa Bay (Note: No. 68: Tampa Bay → Houston (D). See Round 2: Houston → Tampa Bay.)
3	69	Buffalo Bills	T. J. Graham	WR	NC State	from Washington (Note: No. 69: Washington → Buffalo (D). Washington traded a third-round selection (69th overall) to Buffalo in exchange for third- and seventh-round selections (71st and 217th overall).)
3	70	Jacksonville Jaguars	Bryan Anger ^{†}	P	California	
3	71	Washington Redskins	Josh LeRibeus	G	SMU	from Buffalo (Note: No. 71: Buffalo → Washington (D). See Round 3: Washington → Buffalo.)
3	72	Miami Dolphins	Olivier Vernon ^{†}	DE	Miami (FL)	
3	73	San Diego Chargers	Brandon Taylor	S	LSU	from Carolina via Chicago and Miami (Note: No. 73: Carolina → Chicago → Miami → San Diego. Multiple trades: Carolina → Chicago (PD). Carolina traded a third-round selection (73rd overall) to Chicago in exchange for TE Greg Olsen. Chicago → Miami (PD). Chicago traded a third-round selection (73rd overall) and a 2013 third-round selection to Miami in exchange for WR Brandon Marshall. Miami → San Diego (D). Miami traded a third-round selection to San Diego in exchange for third- and sixth-round selections (78th and 183rd overall).)
3	74	Kansas City Chiefs	Donald Stephenson	T	Oklahoma	
3	75	Seattle Seahawks	Russell Wilson ^{†}	QB	Wisconsin	
3	76	Houston Texans	Brandon Brooks ^{†}	G	Miami (OH)	from Philadelphia (Note: No. 76: Philadelphia → Houston (PD). Philadelphia traded third- and fourth-round selections (76th and 99th overall) to Houston in exchange for a third-round selection (88th overall) and LB DeMeco Ryans.)
3	77	New York Jets	Demario Davis ^{†}	LB	Arkansas State	
3	–	Oakland Raiders	selection forfeited in the 2011 Supplemental draft. (Note: Oakland forfeited its third-round selection after selecting QB Terrelle Pryor in the 2011 Supplemental draft.)			
3	78	Miami Dolphins	Michael Egnew	TE	Missouri	from San Diego (Note: No. 78: San Diego → Miami (D). See Round 3: Miami → San Diego.)
3	79	Chicago Bears	Brandon Hardin	S	Oregon State	
3	80	Arizona Cardinals	Jamell Fleming	CB	Oklahoma	
3	81	Dallas Cowboys	Tyrone Crawford	DE	Boise State	
3	82	Tennessee Titans	Mike Martin	DT	Michigan	
3	83	Cincinnati Bengals	Mohamed Sanu	WR	Rutgers	
3	84	Baltimore Ravens	Bernard Pierce	RB	Temple	from Atlanta (Note: No. 84: Atlanta → Baltimore (D). Atlanta traded a third-round selection (84th overall) to Baltimore in exchange for third- and fifth-round selections (91st and 164th overall). (Note: "Ravens take Temple RB Pierce in 3rd round of draft". Sports Illustrated. April 27, 2012.))
3	85	Detroit Lions	Dwight Bentley	CB	Louisiana–Lafayette	
3	86	Pittsburgh Steelers	Sean Spence	LB	Miami (FL)	
3	87	Cleveland Browns	John Hughes	DT	Cincinnati	from Denver (Note: No. 87: Denver → Cleveland (D). See Round 3: Cleveland → Denver.)
3	88	Philadelphia Eagles	Nick Foles ^{†}	QB	Arizona	from Houston; (Note: No. 88: Houston → Philadelphia (PD). See Round 3: Philadelphia → Houston.) Super Bowl LII MVP
3	89	New Orleans Saints	Akiem Hicks ^{†}	DT	Regina	
3	90	New England Patriots	Jake Bequette	DE	Arkansas	from Green Bay (Note: No. 90: Green Bay → New England (D). See Round 2: New England → Green Bay.)
3	91	Atlanta Falcons	Lamar Holmes	T	Southern Miss	from Baltimore (Note: No. 91: Baltimore → Atlanta (D). See Round 3: Atlanta → Baltimore.)
3	92	Indianapolis Colts	T. Y. Hilton ^{†}	WR	FIU	from San Francisco (Note: No. 92: San Francisco → Indianapolis (D). San Francisco traded a third-round selection (92nd overall) to Indianapolis in exchange for a fourth-round selection (97th overall) and a 2013 fifth-round selection.)
3	93	Cincinnati Bengals	Brandon Thompson	DT	Clemson	from New England (Note: No. 93: New England → Cincinnati (D). See Round 1: Cincinnati → New England.)
3	94	New York Giants	Jayron Hosley	CB	Virginia Tech	
3*	95	Oakland Raiders	Tony Bergstrom	G	Utah	
4	96	St. Louis Rams	Chris Givens	WR	Wake Forest	
4	97	Miami Dolphins	Lamar Miller ^{†}	RB	Miami (FL)	from Indianapolis via San Francisco (Note: No. 97: Indianapolis → San Francisco → Miami. Multiple trades: Indianapolis → San Francisco (D). See Round 3: San Francisco → Indianapolis. San Francisco → Miami (D). San Francisco traded a fourth-round selection (97th overall) to Miami in exchange for fourth- and sixth-round selections (103rd and 196th), and a 2013 sixth-round selection.)
4	98	Baltimore Ravens	Gino Gradkowski	G	Delaware	from Minnesota (Note: No. 98: Minnesota → Baltimore (D). See Round 1: Baltimore → Minnesota.)
4	99	Houston Texans	Ben Jones ^{†}	C	Georgia	from Tampa Bay via Philadelphia (Note: No. 99: Tampa Bay → Philadelphia → Houston. Multiple trades: Tampa Bay → Philadelphia (PD). Tampa Bay traded a fourth-round selection (99th overall) and a 2011 fourth-round selection to Philadelphia in exchange for a 2011 fourth-round pick. Philadelphia → Houston (PD). See Round 3: Philadelphia → Houston.)
4	100	Cleveland Browns	Travis Benjamin	WR	Miami (FL)	
4	101	Denver Broncos	Omar Bolden	CB	Arizona State	from Jacksonville via Tampa Bay (Note: No. 101: Jacksonville → Tampa Bay → Denver. Multiple trades: Jacksonville → Tampa Bay (D). See Round 1: Tampa Bay → Jacksonville. Tampa Bay → Denver (D). See Round 1: Denver → Tampa Bay.)
4	102	Washington Redskins	Kirk Cousins ^{†}	QB	Michigan State	
4	103	Carolina Panthers	Frank Alexander	DE	Oklahoma	from Miami via San Francisco (Note: No. 103: Miami → San Francisco → Carolina. Multiple trades: Miami → San Francisco (D). See Round 4: San Francisco → Miami. San Francisco → Carolina (D). San Francisco traded a fourth-round selection (103rd overall) to Carolina in exchange for a sixth-round selection (180th overall) and a 2013 third-round selection.)
4	104	Carolina Panthers	Joe Adams	WR	Arkansas	
4	105	Buffalo Bills	Nigel Bradham	LB	Florida State	
4	106	Seattle Seahawks	Robert Turbin	RB	Utah State	
4	107	Kansas City Chiefs	Devon Wylie	WR	Fresno State	
4	108	Denver Broncos	Philip Blake	C	Baylor	from NY Jets (Note: No. 108: NY Jets → Denver (PD). The NY Jets traded fourth- and sixth-round selections (108th and 188th overall) to Denver in exchange for a seventh-round selection (232nd overall) and QB Tim Tebow.)
4	109	Pittsburgh Steelers	Alameda Ta'amu	DT	Washington	from Oakland via Washington (Note: No. 109: Oakland → Washington → Pittsburgh. Multiple trades: Oakland → Washington (PD). Oakland traded a fourth-round selection (109th overall) to Washington in exchange for QB Jason Campbell. Washington → Pittsburgh (D). Washington traded a fourth-round selection (109th overall) to Pittsburgh in exchange for fourth- and sixth-round selections (119th and 193rd overall).)
4	110	San Diego Chargers	Ladarius Green	TE	Louisiana–Lafayette	
4	111	Chicago Bears	Evan Rodriguez	TE	Temple	
4	112	Arizona Cardinals	Bobby Massie	T	Ole Miss	
4	113	Dallas Cowboys	Kyle Wilber	LB	Wake Forest	
4	114	Seattle Seahawks	Jaye Howard	DT	Florida	from Philadelphia (Note: No. 114: Philadelphia → Seattle (D). See Round 1: Seattle → Philadelphia.)
4	115	Tennessee Titans	Coty Sensabaugh	CB	Clemson	
4	116	Cincinnati Bengals	Orson Charles	TE	Georgia	
4	117	San Francisco 49ers	Joe Looney	G	Wake Forest	from Detroit (Note: No. 117: Detroit → San Francisco (D). Detroit traded a fourth-round selection (117th overall) to San Francisco in exchange for fourth- and sixth-round selections (125th and 196th overall).)
4	118	Minnesota Vikings	Jarius Wright	WR	Arkansas	from Atlanta via Cleveland (Note: No. 118: Atlanta → Cleveland → Minnesota. Multiple trades: Atlanta → Cleveland (PD). See Round 1: Atlanta → Cleveland. Cleveland → Minnesota (PD). See Round 1: Minnesota → Cleveland.)
4	119	Washington Redskins	Keenan Robinson	LB	Texas	from Pittsburgh (Note: No. 119: Pittsburgh → Washington (D). See Round 4: Washington → Pittsburgh.)
4	120	Cleveland Browns	James-Michael Johnson	LB	Nevada	from Denver (Note: No. 120: Denver → Cleveland (D). See Round 3: Cleveland → Denver.)
4	121	Houston Texans	Keshawn Martin	WR	Michigan State	
4	122	New Orleans Saints	Nick Toon	WR	Wisconsin	
4	123	Philadelphia Eagles	Brandon Boykin	CB	Georgia	from Green Bay (Note: No. 123: Green Bay → Philadelphia (D). See Round 2: Philadelphia → Green Bay.)
4	124	Buffalo Bills	Ron Brooks	CB	LSU	from Baltimore (Note: No. 124: Baltimore → Buffalo (PD). Baltimore traded a fourth-round selection (124th overall) to Buffalo in exchange for WR Lee Evans.)
4	125	Detroit Lions	Ronnell Lewis	LB	Oklahoma	from San Francisco (Note: No. 125: San Francisco → Detroit(D). See Round 4: Detroit → San Francisco.)
4	126	Houston Texans	Jared Crick	DE	Nebraska	from New England via Denver and Tampa Bay (Note: No. 126: New England → Denver → Tampa Bay → Houston. Multiple trades: New England → Denver (D). See Round 1: Denver → New England. Denver → Tampa Bay (D). See Round 1: Denver → Tampa Bay. Tampa Bay → Houston (D). See Round 2: Houston → Tampa Bay.)
4	127	New York Giants	Adrien Robinson	TE	Cincinnati	
4*	128	Minnesota Vikings	Rhett Ellison	FB	USC	
4*	129	Oakland Raiders	Miles Burris	LB	San Diego State	
4*	130	Baltimore Ravens	Christian Thompson	S	South Carolina State	
4*	131	New York Giants	Brandon Mosley	T	Auburn	
4*	132	Green Bay Packers	Mike Daniels ^{†}	DT	Iowa	
4*	133	Green Bay Packers	Jerron McMillian	S	Maine	
4*	134	Minnesota Vikings	Greg Childs	WR	Arkansas	
4*	135	Dallas Cowboys	Matt Johnson	S	Eastern Washington	
5	136	Indianapolis Colts	Josh Chapman	DT	Alabama	
5	137	Denver Broncos	Malik Jackson ^{†}	DE	Tennessee	from St. Louis (Note: No. 137: St. Louis → Denver (PD). St. Louis traded a conditional sixth-round selection to Denver in exchange for WR Brandon Lloyd; the selection was later upgraded to a fifth-rounder (137th overall) after a condition was met in which Lloyd made a minimum of 30 receptions with St. Louis during the 2011 season.)
5	138	Detroit Lions	Tahir Whitehead	LB	Temple	from Minnesota (Note: No. 138: Minnesota → Detroit (D). Minnesota traded fifth- and seventh-round selections (138th and 223rd overall) to Detroit in exchange for a seventh-round selection (219th overall) and a 2013 fourth-round selection. (Note: "Lions trade up to get LB Tahir Whitehead out of Temple". DetroitLions.com. April 28, 2012.))
5	139	Minnesota Vikings	Robert Blanton	S	Notre Dame	from Cleveland (Note: No. 139: Cleveland → Minnesota (PD). See Round 1: Minnesota → Cleveland.)
5	140	Tampa Bay Buccaneers	Najee Goode	LB	West Virginia	
5	141	Washington Redskins	Adam Gettis	G	Iowa	
5	142	Jacksonville Jaguars	Brandon Marshall	LB	Nevada	
5	143	Carolina Panthers	Josh Norman ^{†}	CB	Coastal Carolina	
5	144	Buffalo Bills	Zebrie Sanders	T	Florida State	
5	145	Tennessee Titans	Taylor Thompson	DE	SMU	from Miami (Note: No. 145: Miami → Tennessee (D). Miami traded a fifth-round selection (145th overall) to Tennessee in exchange for fifth- and seventh-round selections (155th and 227th overall).)
5	146	Kansas City Chiefs	DeQuan Menzie	CB	Alabama	
5	147	Buffalo Bills	Tank Carder	LB	TCU	from Seattle (Note: No. 147: Seattle → Buffalo (PD). Seattle traded a fifth-round selection (147th overall) and a 2011 fourth-round selection to Buffalo in exchange for RB Marshawn Lynch.)
5	148	Detroit Lions	Chris Greenwood	CB	Albion	from Oakland (Note: No. 148: Oakland → Detroit (D). Oakland traded a fifth-round selection (148th overall) to Detroit in exchange for fifth- and seventh-round selections (158th and 230th overall).)
5	149	San Diego Chargers	Johnnie Troutman	G	Penn State	
5	150	St. Louis Rams	Rokevious Watkins	G	South Carolina	from Chicago (Note: No. 150: Chicago → St. Louis (D). See Round 2: St. Louis → Chicago.)
5	151	Arizona Cardinals	Senio Kelemete	G	Washington	
5	152	Dallas Cowboys	Danny Coale	WR	Virginia Tech	
5	153	Philadelphia Eagles	Dennis Kelly	T	Purdue	
5	154	Seattle Seahawks	Korey Toomer	LB	Idaho	from NY Jets (Note: No. 154: NY Jets → Seattle (D). See Round 2: Seattle → NY Jets.)
5	155	Miami Dolphins	Josh Kaddu	LB	Oregon	from Tennessee (Note: No. 155: Tennessee → Miami (D). See Round 5: Miami → Tennessee.)
5	156	Cincinnati Bengals	Shaun Prater	CB	Iowa	
5	157	Atlanta Falcons	Bradie Ewing	FB	Wisconsin	
5	158	Oakland Raiders	Jack Crawford	DE	Penn State	from Detroit (Note: No. 158: Detroit → Oakland (D). See Round 5: Oakland → Detroit.)
5	159	Pittsburgh Steelers	Chris Rainey	RB	Florida	
5	160	Cleveland Browns	Ryan Miller	G	Colorado	from Denver (Note: No. 160: Denver → Cleveland (PD). Denver traded a fifth-round selection (160th overall) and a 2011 sixth-round selection to Cleveland in exchange for QB Brady Quinn.)
5	161	Houston Texans	Randy Bullock	K	Texas A&M	
5	162	New Orleans Saints	Corey White	S	Samford	
5	163	Green Bay Packers	Terrell Manning	LB	NC State	from Green Bay via New England (Note: No. 163: Green Bay → New England → Green Bay. Multiple trades: Green Bay → New England (D). See Round 2: New England → Green Bay. New England → Green Bay (D). New England traded a fifth-round selection (163rd overall) to Green Bay in exchange for a sixth-round selection and two seventh-round selections (197th, 224th and 235th overall). (Note: "Packers trade up to take NC State's Terrell Manning in fifth round". Green Bay Press Gazette. April 28, 2012.))
5	164	Atlanta Falcons	Jonathan Massaquoi	DE	Troy	from Baltimore (Note: No. 164: Baltimore → Atlanta (D). See Round 3: Atlanta → Baltimore.)
5	165	San Francisco 49ers	Darius Fleming	LB	Notre Dame	
5	166	Cincinnati Bengals	Marvin Jones	WR	California	from New England (Note: No. 166: New England → Cincinnati (PD). New England traded a fifth-round selection (166th overall) and a 2013 sixth-round selection to Cincinnati in exchange for WR Chad Ochocinco.)
5	167	Cincinnati Bengals	George Iloka	S	Boise State	from NY Giants (Note: No. 167: NY Giants → Cincinnati (PD). The NY Giants traded a fifth-round selection (167th overall) to Cincinnati in exchange for LB Keith Rivers.)
5*	168	Oakland Raiders	Juron Criner	WR	Arizona	
5*	169	Baltimore Ravens	Asa Jackson	CB	Cal Poly	
5*	170	Indianapolis Colts	Vick Ballard	RB	Mississippi State	
6	171	St. Louis Rams	Greg Zuerlein ^{†}	K	Missouri Western	
6	172	Seattle Seahawks	Jeremy Lane	CB	Northwestern State	from Indianapolis via Philadelphia (Note: No. 172: Indianapolis → Philadelphia → Seattle. Multiple trades: Indianapolis → Philadelphia (PD). Indianapolis traded a sixth-round selection (172nd overall) to Philadelphia for a sixth-round selection (187th overall) and OT Winston Justice. Philadelphia → Seattle (D). See Round 1: Seattle → Philadelphia.)
6	173	Washington Redskins	Alfred Morris ^{†}	RB	Florida Atlantic	from Minnesota (Note: No. 173: Minnesota → Washington (PD). Minnesota traded a sixth-round selection (173rd overall) to Washington in exchange for QB Donovan McNabb. The trade also included a condition for the Vikings to receive a sixth-round pick in the 2013 draft, but McNabb did not reach the playing time benchmarks that would have triggered the additional compensation.)
6	174	Tampa Bay Buccaneers	Keith Tandy	CB	West Virginia	
6	175	Minnesota Vikings	Blair Walsh ^{†}	K	Georgia	from Cleveland (Note: No. 175: Cleveland → Minnesota (PD). Cleveland traded a sixth-round selection (175th overall) to Minnesota in exchange for DE Jayme Mitchell.)
6	176	Jacksonville Jaguars	Mike Harris	CB	Florida State	
6	177	Arizona Cardinals	Justin Bethel ^{†}	S	Presbyterian	from Washington (Note: No. 177: Washington → Arizona (PD). Washington traded a sixth-round selection (177th overall) and DE Vonnie Holliday to Arizona in exchange for RB Tim Hightower.)
6	178	Buffalo Bills	Mark Asper	G	Oregon	
6	179	New Orleans Saints	Andrew Tiller	G	Syracuse	from Miami (Note: No. 179: Miami → New Orleans (PD). Miami traded a sixth-round selection (179th overall) to New Orleans for a sixth-round selection (196th overall) and RB Reggie Bush.)
6	180	San Francisco 49ers	Trenton Robinson	S	Michigan State	from Carolina (Note: No. 180: Carolina → San Francisco (D). See Round 4: San Francisco → Carolina.)
6	181	Seattle Seahawks	Winston Guy	S	Kentucky	
6	182	Kansas City Chiefs	Cyrus Gray	RB	Texas A&M	
6	183	Miami Dolphins	B.J. Cunningham	WR	Michigan State	from San Diego (Note: No. 183: San Diego → Miami (D). See Round 3: Miami → San Diego.)
6	184	Chicago Bears	Isaiah Frey	CB	Nevada	
6	185	Arizona Cardinals	Ryan Lindley	QB	San Diego State	
6	186	Dallas Cowboys	James Hanna	TE	Oklahoma	
6	187	New York Jets	Josh Bush	S	Wake Forest	from Philadelphia via Indianapolis (Note: No. 187: Philadelphia → Indianapolis → NY Jets. Multiple trades: Philadelphia → Indianapolis (PD). See Round 5: Indianapolis → Philadelphia. Indianapolis → NY Jets (PD). Indianapolis traded a sixth-round selection (187th overall) to the NY Jets in exchange for a seventh-round selection (214th overall) and QB Drew Stanton.)
6	188	Denver Broncos	Danny Trevathan	LB	Kentucky	from NY Jets (Note: No. 188: NY Jets → Denver (PD). See Round 4: NY Jets → Denver.)
6	189	Oakland Raiders	Christo Bilukidi	DT	Georgia State	
6	190	Tennessee Titans	Markelle Martin	S	Oklahoma State	
6	191	Cincinnati Bengals	Dan Herron	RB	Ohio State	
6	–	Detroit Lions	selection forfeited (Note: Detroit forfeited its sixth-round selection due to findings of tampering consisting of comments made by defensive coordinator Gunther Cunningham about certain Kansas City Chiefs' players.)			
6	192	Atlanta Falcons	Charles Mitchell	S	Mississippi State	
6	193	Washington Redskins	Tom Compton	T	South Dakota	from Pittsburgh (Note: No. 193: Pittsburgh → Washington (D). See Round 4: Washington → Pittsburgh.)
6	194	Philadelphia Eagles	Marvin McNutt	WR	Iowa	from Denver (Note: No. 194: Denver → Philadelphia (PD). Denver traded a conditional sixth-round selection (194th overall) to Philadelphia in exchange for LB Joe Mays. Denver originally sent RB J. J. Arrington to Philadelphia, with the condition that if Arrington did not make Philadelphia's 53-man roster, Denver would instead send the sixth-round selection.)
6	195	Houston Texans	Nick Mondek	T	Purdue	
6	196	Detroit Lions	Jonte Green	CB	New Mexico State	from New Orleans via Miami and San Francisco (Note: No. 196: New Orleans → Miami → San Francisco → Detroit. Multiple trades: New Orleans → Miami (PD). See Round 6: Miami → New Orleans. Miami → San Francisco (D). See Round 4: San Francisco → Miami. San Francisco → Detroit(D). See Round 4: Detroit → San Francisco.)
6	197	New England Patriots	Nate Ebner	S	Ohio State	from Green Bay (Note: No. 197: Green Bay → New England (D). See Round 5: Green Bay → New England.)
6	198	Baltimore Ravens	Tommy Streeter	WR	Miami (FL)	
6	199	San Francisco 49ers	Jason Slowey	T	Western Oregon	
6	200	Philadelphia Eagles	Brandon Washington	G	Miami (FL)	from New England (Note: No. 200: New England → Philadelphia (PD). New England traded a sixth-round selection (200th overall) to Philadelphia in exchange for a seventh-round selection (223rd) and LB Tracy White.)
6	201	New York Giants	Matt McCants	T	UAB	
6*	202	New York Jets	Terrance Ganaway	RB	Baylor	
6*	203	New York Jets	Robert Griffin	G	Baylor	
6*	204	Cleveland Browns	Emmanuel Acho	LB	Texas	
6*	205	Cleveland Browns	Billy Winn	DT	Boise State	
6*	206	Indianapolis Colts	LaVon Brazill	WR	Ohio	
6*	207	Carolina Panthers	Brad Nortman	P	Wisconsin	
7	208	Indianapolis Colts	Justin Anderson	G	Georgia	
7	209	St. Louis Rams	Aaron Brown	LB	Hawaii	
7	210	Minnesota Vikings	Audie Cole	LB	NC State	
7	211	Tennessee Titans	Scott Solomon	DE	Rice	from Cleveland via Minnesota (Note: No. 211: Cleveland → Minnesota → Tennessee. Multiple trades: Cleveland → Minnesota (PD). See Round 1: Minnesota → Cleveland. Minnesota → Tennessee (D). Minnesota traded a seventh-round selection (211th overall) to Tennessee in exchange for a 2013 sixth-round selection.)
7	212	Tampa Bay Buccaneers	Michael Smith	RB	Utah State	
7	213	Washington Redskins	Richard Crawford	CB	SMU	
7	214	Indianapolis Colts	Tim Fugger	LB	Vanderbilt	from Jacksonville via NY Jets (Note: No. 214: Jacksonville → NY Jets → Indianapolis. Multiple trades: Jacksonville → NY Jets (PD). Jacksonville traded a seventh-round selection (214th overall) to the NY Jets in exchange for S Dwight Lowery. NY Jets → Indianapolis (PD). See Round 6: Indianapolis → NY Jets.)
7	215	Miami Dolphins	Kheeston Randall	DT	Texas	
7	216	Carolina Panthers	D. J. Campbell	S	California	
7	217	Washington Redskins	Jordan Bernstine	CB	Iowa	from Buffalo (Note: No. 217: Buffalo → Washington (D). See Round 3: Washington → Buffalo.)
7	218	Kansas City Chiefs	Jerome Long	DT	San Diego State	
7	219	Minnesota Vikings	Trevor Guyton	DE	California	from Seattle via Detroit (Note: No. 219: Seattle → Detroit → Minnesota. Multiple trades: Seattle → Detroit (PD). Seattle traded a seventh-round selection (219th overall) to Detroit in exchange for OT Tyler Polumbus. Detroit → Minnesota (D). See Round 5: Minnesota → Detroit.)
7	220	Chicago Bears	Greg McCoy	CB	TCU	
7	221	Arizona Cardinals	Nate Potter	T	Boise State	
7	222	Dallas Cowboys	Caleb McSurdy	ILB	Montana	
7	223	Detroit Lions	Travis Lewis	OLB	Oklahoma	from Philadelphia via New England (Note: No. 223: Philadelphia → New England → Detroit. Multiple trades: Philadelphia → New England (PD). See Round 6: New England → Philadelphia. New England → Minnesota (PD). New England traded a seventh-round selection and WR Randy Moss to Minnesota in exchange for a 2011 third-round selection. Minnesota → Detroit (D). See Round 5: Minnesota → Detroit.)
7	224	New England Patriots	Alfonzo Dennard	CB	Nebraska	from NY Jets via Green Bay (Note: No. 224: NY Jets → Green Bay → New England. Multiple trades: NY Jets → Green Bay (PD). The NY Jets traded a seventh-round selection (224th overall) to Green Bay in exchange for G Caleb Schlauderaff. Green Bay → New England (D). See Round 5: New England → Green Bay.)
7	225	Seattle Seahawks	J. R. Sweezy	G	NC State	from Oakland (Note: No. 225: Oakland → Seattle (PD). Oakland traded a seventh-round selection (225th overall) and a conditional 2013 mid-round selection to Seattle in exchange for LB Aaron Curry. The 2013 selection became the Raiders' fifth-rounder after Curry lasted barely more than a year before getting cut by the Raiders.)
7	226	San Diego Chargers	David Molk	C	Michigan	
7	227	Miami Dolphins	Rishard Matthews	WR	Nevada	from Tennessee (Note: No. 227: Tennessee → Miami (D). See Round 5: Miami → Tennessee.)
7	228	Jacksonville Jaguars	Jeris Pendleton	DT	Ashland	from Cincinnati (Note: No. 228: Cincinnati → Jacksonville (PD). Cincinnati traded a seventh-round selection (228th overall) and CB David Jones to Jacksonville in exchange for S Reggie Nelson.)
7	229	Philadelphia Eagles	Bryce Brown	RB	Kansas State	from Atlanta (Note: No. 229: Atlanta → Philadelphia (PD). Atlanta traded a seventh-round selection (229th overall) to Philadelphia in exchange for CB Asante Samuel. (Note: Frank, Reuben (April 25, 2012). "Eagles trade Asante to Falcons for 7th-rounder". Comcast SportsNet Philly.))
7	230	Oakland Raiders	Nathan Stupar	OLB	Penn State	from Detroit (Note: No. 230: Detroit → Oakland (D). See Round 5: Oakland → Detroit.)
7	231	Pittsburgh Steelers	Toney Clemons	WR	Colorado	
7	232	Seattle Seahawks	Greg Scruggs	DE	Louisville	from Denver via NY Jets (Note: No. 232: Denver → NY Jets → Seattle. Multiple trades: Denver → NY Jets (PD). See Round 4: NY Jets → Denver. NY Jets → Seattle (D). See Round 2: Seattle → NY Jets.)
7	233	Tampa Bay Buccaneers	Drake Dunsmore	TE	Northwestern	from Houston (Note: No. 233: Houston → Tampa Bay (D). See Round 2: Houston → Tampa Bay.)
7	234	New Orleans Saints	Marcel Jones	T	Nebraska	
7	235	New England Patriots	Jeremy Ebert	WR	Northwestern	from Green Bay (Note: No. 235: Green Bay → New England (D). See Round 5: Green Bay → New England.)
7	236	Baltimore Ravens	DeAngelo Tyson	DT	Georgia	
7	237	San Francisco 49ers	Cam Johnson	DE	Virginia	
7	238	Kansas City Chiefs	Junior Hemingway	WR	Michigan	from New England (Note: No. 238: New England → Kansas City (PD). New England traded a conditional seventh-round selection (238th overall) to Kansas City in exchange for S Jarrad Page.)
7	239	New York Giants	Markus Kuhn	DT	NC State	
7*	240	Pittsburgh Steelers	David Paulson	TE	Oregon	
7*	241	Green Bay Packers	Andrew Datko	T	Florida State	
7*	242	New York Jets	Antonio Allen	S	South Carolina	
7*	243	Green Bay Packers	B. J. Coleman	QB	Chattanooga	
7*	244	New York Jets	Jordan White	WR	Western Michigan	
7*	245	Cleveland Browns	Trevin Wade	CB	Arizona	
7*	246	Pittsburgh Steelers	Terrence Frederick	CB	Texas A&M	
7*	247	Cleveland Browns	Brad Smelley	TE	Alabama	
7*	248	Pittsburgh Steelers	Kelvin Beachum	G	SMU	
7*	249	Atlanta Falcons	Travian Robertson	DT	South Carolina	
7*	250	San Diego Chargers	Edwin Baker	RB	Michigan State	
7*	251	Buffalo Bills	John Potter	K	Western Michigan	
7^	252	St. Louis Rams	Daryl Richardson	RB	Abilene Christian	
7^	253	Indianapolis Colts	Chandler Harnish	QB	Northern Illinois	

== Supplemental draft ==
A supplemental draft was held on July 12, 2012. For each player selected in this draft, the team forfeits its pick in that round in the draft of the following season. Eight players were available, but only one was selected.

Supplemental draft picks
Rnd.	Pick	Team	Player	Pos.	College	Notes
2	—	Cleveland Browns	Josh Gordon ^{†}	WR	Baylor	

== Notable undrafted players ==
^{†}	Pro Bowl

Some notable undrafted players:

Undrafted player signings
Original NFL team	Player	Pos.	College	Notes
Arizona Cardinals	Fozzy Whittaker	RB	Texas	
Atlanta Falcons	Dominique Davis	QB	East Carolina	
Atlanta Falcons	Josh Harris ^{†}	LS	Auburn	
Atlanta Falcons	Peyton Thompson	S	San Jose State	
Baltimore Ravens	Bobby Rainey	RB	Western Kentucky	
Baltimore Ravens	Deonte Thompson	WR	Florida	
Baltimore Ravens	Justin Tucker ^{†}	K	Texas	
Buffalo Bills	Shawn Powell	P	Florida State	
Chicago Bears	Joseph Anderson	WR	Texas Southern	
Chicago Bears	Ryan Quigley	P	Boston College	
Cincinnati Bengals	Vontaze Burfict ^{†}	LB	Arizona State	
Cincinnati Bengals	Chris Lewis-Harris	CB	Chattanooga	
Cincinnati Bengals	Trevor Robinson	C	Notre Dame	
Cleveland Browns	L. J. Fort	LB	Northern Iowa	
Cleveland Browns	Tashaun Gipson ^{†}	S	Wyoming	
Dallas Cowboys	Cole Beasley	WR	SMU	
Dallas Cowboys	Charley Hughlett	LS	UCF	
Dallas Cowboys	Ronald Leary	G	Memphis	
Dallas Cowboys	Jamize Olawale	FB	North Texas	
Denver Broncos	Aaron Brewer	LS	San Diego State	
Denver Broncos	Duke Ihenacho	S	San Jose State	
Denver Broncos	Mike Remmers	T	Oregon State	
Detroit Lions	Kellen Moore	QB	Boise State	
Green Bay Packers	Don Barclay	T	West Virginia	
Green Bay Packers	Brandon Bostick	TE	Newberry	
Green Bay Packers	Dezman Moses	LB	Tulane	
Green Bay Packers	Sean Richardson	S	Vanderbilt	
Green Bay Packers	Greg Van Roten	C	Penn	
Houston Texans	Jonathan Grimes	RB	William & Mary	
Houston Texans	Case Keenum	QB	Houston	
Houston Texans	Eddie Pleasant	S	Oregon	
Jacksonville Jaguars	Valentino Blake	CB	UTEP	
Jacksonville Jaguars	Jarrett Boykin	WR	Virginia Tech	
Jacksonville Jaguars	Drew Nowak	C	Western Michigan	
Kansas City Chiefs	Josh Bellamy	WR	Louisville	
Kansas City Chiefs	Alex Tanney	QB	Monmouth (IL)	
Miami Dolphins	Derrick Shelby	DE	Utah	
Minnesota Vikings	Austin Pasztor	T	Virginia	
New England Patriots	Brandon Bolden	RB	Ole Miss	
New Orleans Saints	Travaris Cadet	RB	Appalachian State	
New Orleans Saints	A. J. Davis	CB	Jacksonville State	
New Orleans Saints	Erik Harris	S	California (PA)	
New York Jets	Damon Harrison	DT	William Penn	
New York Jets	Matt Simms	QB	Tennessee	
Oakland Raiders	Marquette King	P	Fort Valley State	
Oakland Raiders	Lucas Nix	G	Pittsburgh	
Philadelphia Eagles	Chase Ford	TE	Miami (FL)	
Pittsburgh Steelers	Drew Butler	P	Georgia	
Pittsburgh Steelers	Robert Golden	S	Arizona	
San Diego Chargers	Michael Harris	G	UCLA	
San Francisco 49ers	Garrett Celek	TE	Michigan State	
San Francisco 49ers	Chris Owusu	WR	Stanford	
San Francisco 49ers	Michael Thomas ^{†}	S	Stanford	
St. Louis Rams	Austin Davis	QB	Southern Miss	
St. Louis Rams	Cory Harkey	FB	UCLA	
St. Louis Rams	Johnny Hekker ^{†}	P	Oregon State	
St. Louis Rams	Rodney McLeod	FS	Virginia	
Seattle Seahawks	Derrick Coleman	FB	UCLA	
Seattle Seahawks	Jermaine Kearse	WR	Washington	
Seattle Seahawks	Sean McGrath	TE	Henderson State	
Seattle Seahawks	DeShawn Shead	CB	Portland State	
Tennessee Titans	William Vlachos	C	Alabama	

== Hall of Famers ==
- Luke Kuechly, linebacker from Boston College, taken 1st round, 9th overall by the Carolina Panthers.

Inducted: Professional Football Hall of Fame Class of 2026.

== Trades ==
In the explanations below, (D) denotes trades that took place during the draft, while (PD) indicates trades completed pre-draft.

== Forfeited picks ==
Three picks in the 2012 draft were forfeited:

== Selections by conference ==
Selection totals by college conference (including supplemental draft)

Conference	Players selected	Division
Southeastern Conference	42	I FBS
Big Ten Conference	41	I FBS
Atlantic Coast Conference	31	I FBS
Pac-12 Conference	28	I FBS
Big 12 Conference	26	I FBS
Big East Conference	12	I FBS
Mountain West Conference	12	I FBS
Western Athletic Conference	11	I FBS
Conference USA	10	I FBS
Mid-American Conference	8	I FBS
Sun Belt Conference	6	I FBS
Independent	5	I FBS
Big Sky Conference	3	I FCS
Southern Conference	3	I FCS
Big South Conference	2	I FCS
Colonial Athletic Association	2	I FCS
Great West Conference	2	I FCS
Lone Star Conference	2	II
Canada West Universities Athletic Association	1	CIS
Great Lakes Intercollegiate Athletic Conference	1	II
Great Northwest Athletic Conference	1	II
Gulf South Conference	1	II
Michigan Intercollegiate Athletic Association	1	III
Mid-America Intercollegiate Athletics Association	1	II
Mid-Eastern Athletic Conference	1	I FCS
Southland Conference	1	I FCS
