= 2011 NCAA Division II football season =

American college football season

- Total No. of teams: 156
- Regular season: September 1 – November 12, 2011
- Playoffs: November 19 – December 17, 2011
- National Championship: Braly Municipal Stadium; Florence, AL
- Champion: Pittsburg State
- Harlon Hill Trophy: Jonas Randolph, Mars Hill

The 2011 NCAA Division II football season, part of college football in the United States organized by the National Collegiate Athletic Association at the Division II level, began on September 1, 2011, and concluded with the NCAA Division II Football Championship on December 17, 2011 at Braly Municipal Stadium in Florence, Alabama, hosted by the University of North Alabama. The Pittsburg State Gorillas defeated the Wayne State Warriors, 35–21, to win their second Division II national title.

The Harlon Hill Trophy was awarded to Jonas Randolph, running back from Mars Hill.

== Conference and program changes ==
- The Great American Conference began play this season with nine member teams from Arkansas and Oklahoma.

| School | Former conference | New conference |
|---|---|---|
| Arkansas–Monticello Boll Weevils | Gulf South | Great American |
| Arkansas Tech Wonder Boys | Gulf South | Great American |
| Black Hills State Yellow Jackets | DAC (NAIA) | Independent |
| Central Oklahoma Bronchos | Lone Star | Independent |
| East Central Tigers | Lone Star | Great American |
| Harding Bisons | Gulf South | Great American |
| Henderson State Reddies | Gulf South | Great American |
| Lambuth Eagles | Independent | School closed |
| Lincoln Blue Tigers | Independent | MIAA |
| Lindenwood Lions | HAAC (NAIA) | Independent |
| Minot State Beavers | DAC (NAIA) | Independent |
| Nebraska–Omaha Mavericks | MIAA | Dropped program |
| Northeastern State RiverHawks | Lone Star | Independent |
| Ouachita Baptist Tigers | Gulf South | Great American |
| Saint Paul's Tigers | CIAA | Dropped program |
| Sioux Falls Cougars | GPAC (NAIA) | Independent |
| South Dakota Mines Hardrockers | DAC (NAIA) | Independent |
| Southern Arkansas Muleriders | Gulf South | Great American |
| Southeastern Oklahoma State Savage Storm | Lone Star | Great American |
| Southwestern Oklahoma State Bulldogs | Lone Star | Great American |
| William Jewell Cardinals | HAAC (NAIA) | Independent |

Ohio Dominican completed their transition to Division II and became eligible for the postseason.

== Conference standings ==
=== Super Region 1 ===
2011 Central Intercollegiate Athletic Association football standings
| | Conf. | | | Overall |
| Team | W | | L | W | | L |
|---|---|---|---|---|---|---|
Northern
| Elizabeth City State xy^ | 6 | – | 1 | 8 | – | 4 |
| Virginia State | 4 | – | 3 | 5 | – | 5 |
| Virginia Union | 3 | – | 4 | 5 | – | 5 |
| Bowie State | 3 | – | 4 | 4 | – | 6 |
| Chowan | 2 | – | 5 | 3 | – | 7 |
| Lincoln (PA) | 2 | – | 5 | 2 | – | 8 |
Southern
| No. 3 Winston-Salem State xy$^ | 7 | – | 0 | 13 | – | 1 |
| Johnson C. Smith # | 4 | – | 3 | 6 | – | 5 |
| Fayetteville State | 4 | – | 3 | 4 | – | 6 |
| St. Augustine's | 3 | – | 4 | 4 | – | 6 |
| Shaw | 3 | – | 4 | 3 | – | 7 |
| Livingstone | 0 | – | 7 | 1 | – | 9 |
Championship: Winston–Salem State 38, Elizabeth City State 18
$ – Conference champion; x – Division champion/co-champions; y – Championship game participant; ^ – NCAA Division II playoff participant; # – Pioneer Bowl participant; Rankings from AFCA Poll

2011 Northeast-10 Conference football standings
| | Conf. | | | Overall |
| Team | W | | L | W | | L |
|---|---|---|---|---|---|---|
| No. 8 New Haven $^ | 8 | – | 0 | 11 | – | 2 |
| Southern Connecticut | 6 | – | 2 | 7 | – | 3 |
| American International | 5 | – | 3 | 6 | – | 4 |
| Bentley | 5 | – | 3 | 6 | – | 4 |
| Merrimack | 5 | – | 3 | 6 | – | 4 |
| Assumption | 3 | – | 5 | 4 | – | 6 |
| Stonehill | 3 | – | 5 | 4 | – | 7 |
| Saint Anselm | 1 | – | 7 | 1 | – | 9 |
| Pace | 0 | – | 8 | 1 | – | 9 |
$ – Conference champion; ^ – NCAA Division II playoff participant; Rankings from AFCA poll

2011 Pennsylvania State Athletic Conference football standings
| | Conf. | | | Overall |
| Team | W | | L | W | | L |
|---|---|---|---|---|---|---|
East
| No. 13 Kutztown xy$^ | 6 | – | 1 | 11 | – | 2 |
| C. W. Post x | 6 | – | 1 | 7 | – | 4 |
| No. 21 Bloomsburg | 5 | – | 2 | 9 | – | 2 |
| Shippensburg | 4 | – | 3 | 7 | – | 4 |
| West Chester | 4 | – | 3 | 5 | – | 6 |
| Millersville | 2 | – | 5 | 3 | – | 8 |
| East Stroudsburg | 1 | – | 6 | 3 | – | 8 |
| Cheyney | 0 | – | 7 | 1 | – | 10 |
West
| No. 15 California (PA) x^ | 6 | – | 1 | 10 | – | 3 |
| Slippery Rock xy | 6 | – | 1 | 8 | – | 3 |
| IUP | 5 | – | 2 | 7 | – | 3 |
| Edinboro | 4 | – | 3 | 7 | – | 4 |
| Gannon | 3 | – | 4 | 4 | – | 7 |
| Mercyhurst | 2 | – | 5 | 4 | – | 7 |
| Clarion | 2 | – | 5 | 3 | – | 8 |
| Lock Haven | 0 | – | 7 | 0 | – | 10 |
Championship: Kutztown 21, Slippery Rock 14
x – Division champion/co-champions; y – Championship game participant; ^ – NCAA Division II playoff participant; Rankings from AFCA poll

2011 West Virginia Intercollegiate Athletic Conference football standings
| | Conf. | | | Overall |
| Team | W | | L | W | | L |
|---|---|---|---|---|---|---|
| Concord $^ | 7 | – | 1 | 7 | – | 4 |
| No. 22 Shepherd | 6 | – | 2 | 9 | – | 2 |
| No. 24 West Virginia Wesleyan | 6 | – | 2 | 9 | – | 2 |
| Charleston (WV) | 5 | – | 3 | 5 | – | 6 |
| Glenville State | 5 | – | 3 | 5 | – | 6 |
| Fairmont State | 4 | – | 4 | 7 | – | 4 |
| Seton Hill | 1 | – | 7 | 1 | – | 10 |
| West Liberty | 1 | – | 7 | 1 | – | 10 |
| West Virginia State | 1 | – | 7 | 1 | – | 9 |
$ – Conference champion; ^ – NCAA Division II playoff participant; Rankings from AFCA Poll

=== Super Region 2 ===
2011 Gulf South Conference football standings
| | Conf. | | | Overall |
| Team | W | | L | W | | L |
|---|---|---|---|---|---|---|
| No. 4 Delta State $^ | 3 | – | 1 | 11 | – | 3 |
| No. 14 North Alabama ^ | 2 | – | 2 | 9 | – | 4 |
| No. 23 West Alabama ^ | 2 | – | 2 | 8 | – | 4 |
| West Georgia | 2 | – | 2 | 6 | – | 4 |
| Valdosta State | 1 | – | 3 | 6 | – | 4 |
$ – Conference champion; ^ – NCAA Division II playoff participant; Rankings from AFCA Poll

2011 South Atlantic Conference football standings
| | Conf. | | | Overall |
| Team | W | | L | W | | L |
|---|---|---|---|---|---|---|
| No. 19 Mars Hill +^ | 6 | – | 1 | 8 | – | 3 |
| Lenoir–Rhyne + | 6 | – | 1 | 7 | – | 3 |
| Wingate | 4 | – | 3 | 5 | – | 6 |
| Newberry | 4 | – | 3 | 4 | – | 6 |
| Carson–Newman | 3 | – | 4 | 5 | – | 6 |
| Catawba | 2 | – | 5 | 3 | – | 8 |
| Tusculum | 2 | – | 5 | 3 | – | 8 |
| Brevard | 1 | – | 6 | 3 | – | 8 |
+ – Conference co-champions; ^ – NCAA Division II playoff participant; Rankings from AFCA poll

2011 Southern Intercollegiate Athletic Conference football standings
| | Conf. | | | Overall |
| Team | W | | L | W | | L |
|---|---|---|---|---|---|---|
East
| Albany State xy^ | 6 | – | 1 | 8 | – | 4 |
| Morehouse x | 6 | – | 1 | 8 | – | 2 |
| Fort Valley State | 2 | – | 5 | 2 | – | 8 |
| Benedict | 1 | – | 6 | 2 | – | 8 |
| Clark Atlanta | 1 | – | 6 | 2 | – | 8 |
West
| Miles # xy$ | 5 | – | 2 | 7 | – | 5 |
| Stillman x | 5 | – | 2 | 7 | – | 4 |
| Tuskegee | 4 | – | 3 | 4 | – | 6 |
| Kentucky State | 3 | – | 4 | 6 | – | 4 |
| Lane | 2 | – | 5 | 4 | – | 6 |
Championship: Miles 20, Albany State 17
$ – Conference champion; x – Division champion/co-champions; y – Championship game participant; ^ – NCAA Division II playoff participant; # – Pioneer Bowl participant; Rankings from AFCA Poll

2011 NCAA Division II Super Region 2 independents football records
| | Conf. | | | Overall |
| Team | W | | L | W | | L |
|---|---|---|---|---|---|---|
| No. 12 North Greenville ^ | | – | | 11 | – | 3 |
| UNC Pembroke | | – | | 8 | – | 3 |
^ – NCAA Division II playoff participant; Rankings from AFCA Poll

=== Super Region 3 ===
2011 Great Lakes Intercollegiate Athletic Conference football standings
| | Conf. | | | Overall |
| Team | W | | L | W | | L |
|---|---|---|---|---|---|---|
North
| Grand Valley State | 7 | – | 3 | 8 | – | 3 |
| Saginaw Valley State ^ | 7 | – | 3 | 7 | – | 4 |
| Indianapolis | 6 | – | 4 | 7 | – | 4 |
| Michigan Tech | 6 | – | 4 | 7 | – | 4 |
| Ferris State | 5 | – | 5 | 6 | – | 5 |
| Northern Michigan | 3 | – | 7 | 4 | – | 7 |
| Northwood | 1 | – | 9 | 2 | – | 9 |
South
| Hillsdale $ | 8 | – | 2 | 8 | – | 3 |
| No. 2 Wayne State (MI) ^ | 7 | – | 3 | 12 | – | 4 |
| Ohio Dominican | 6 | – | 4 | 7 | – | 4 |
| Ashland | 6 | – | 4 | 6 | – | 5 |
| Findlay | 6 | – | 4 | 6 | – | 5 |
| Lake Erie | 2 | – | 8 | 3 | – | 8 |
| Tiffin | 0 | – | 10 | 0 | – | 11 |
$ – Conference champion; ^ – NCAA Division II playoff participant; Rankings from AFCA poll

2011 Northern Sun Intercollegiate Conference football standings
| | Conf. | | | Overall |
| Team | W | | L | W | | L |
|---|---|---|---|---|---|---|
North
| No. 6 Minnesota–Duluth +^ | 8 | – | 2 | 11 | – | 3 |
| No. 17 St. Cloud State +^ | 8 | – | 2 | 9 | – | 3 |
| Bemidji State | 7 | – | 3 | 8 | – | 3 |
| Mary | 4 | – | 6 | 5 | – | 6 |
| Northern State | 4 | – | 6 | 5 | – | 6 |
| MSU Moorhead | 1 | – | 9 | 2 | – | 9 |
| Minnesota–Crookston | 0 | – | 10 | 1 | – | 10 |
South
| Minnesota State # + | 8 | – | 2 | 9 | – | 3 |
| Wayne State (NE) | 7 | – | 3 | 7 | – | 4 |
| Winona State | 7 | – | 3 | 7 | – | 4 |
| Augustana (SD) | 6 | – | 4 | 6 | – | 5 |
| Concordia–St. Paul | 5 | – | 5 | 6 | – | 5 |
| SW Minnesota State | 3 | – | 7 | 3 | – | 8 |
| Upper Iowa | 2 | – | 8 | 3 | – | 8 |
+ – Conference co-champions; ^ – NCAA Division II playoff participant; # – Mineral Water Bowl participant; Rankings from AFCA Poll

2011 Rocky Mountain Athletic Conference football standings
| | Conf. | | | Overall |
| Team | W | | L | W | | L |
|---|---|---|---|---|---|---|
| No. 9 CSU Pueblo $^ | 9 | – | 0 | 11 | – | 1 |
| No. 10 Nebraska–Kearney ^ | 8 | – | 1 | 10 | – | 2 |
| Colorado Mines | 6 | – | 3 | 8 | – | 3 |
| Chadron State | 6 | – | 3 | 6 | – | 5 |
| Adams State | 4 | – | 5 | 6 | – | 5 |
| Western New Mexico | 4 | – | 5 | 5 | – | 6 |
| Colorado Mesa | 3 | – | 6 | 4 | – | 7 |
| New Mexico Highlands | 2 | – | 7 | 4 | – | 7 |
| Fort Lewis | 2 | – | 7 | 3 | – | 8 |
| Western State | 1 | – | 8 | 1 | – | 10 |
$ – Conference champion; ^ – NCAA Division II playoff participant; Rankings from AFCA Poll

2011 Great Lakes Football Conference standings
| | Conf. | | | Overall |
| Team | W | | L | W | | L |
|---|---|---|---|---|---|---|
| Urbana $ | 3 | – | 0 | 8 | – | 3 |
| Missouri S&T | 2 | – | 1 | 6 | – | 5 |
| Saint Joseph's (IN) | 1 | – | 2 | 2 | – | 8 |
| Kentucky Wesleyan | 0 | – | 3 | 1 | – | 10 |
$ – Conference champion

2011 NCAA Division II Super Region 3 independents football records
| | Conf. | | | Overall |
| Team | W | | L | W | | L |
|---|---|---|---|---|---|---|
| Sioux Falls # | | – | | 5 | – | 4 |
| Notre Dame (OH) # | | – | | 5 | – | 6 |
| William Jewell # | | – | | 4 | – | 6 |
| Black Hills State # | | – | | 3 | – | 7 |
| Minot State # | | – | | 2 | – | 8 |
| Central State | | – | | 1 | – | 10 |
| South Dakota Mines # | | – | | 1 | – | 10 |
# – Provisional Division II member; Rankings from AFCA Poll

=== Super Region 4 ===
2011 Great American Conference football standings
| | Conf. | | | Overall |
| Team | W | | L | W | | L |
|---|---|---|---|---|---|---|
| Ouachita Baptist $ | 6 | – | 1 | 7 | – | 3 |
| Henderson State | 4 | – | 1 | 6 | – | 4 |
| East Central | 6 | – | 2 | 8 | – | 3 |
| Arkansas–Monticello | 3 | – | 3 | 5 | – | 6 |
| Harding | 3 | – | 3 | 4 | – | 7 |
| Southern Arkansas | 3 | – | 4 | 3 | – | 7 |
| SW Oklahoma State | 3 | – | 5 | 5 | – | 6 |
| Arkansas Tech | 1 | – | 4 | 2 | – | 8 |
| SE Oklahoma State | 1 | – | 7 | 2 | – | 8 |
$ – Conference champion; ^ – NCAA Division II playoff participant; Rankings from AFCA poll

2011 Great Northwest Athletic Conference football standings
| | Conf. | | | Overall |
| Team | W | | L | W | | L |
|---|---|---|---|---|---|---|
| No. 20 Humboldt State $ | 7 | – | 1 | 9 | – | 1 |
| Western Oregon | 6 | – | 2 | 6 | – | 5 |
| Central Washington | 4 | – | 4 | 4 | – | 6 |
| Simon Fraser # | 2 | – | 6 | 3 | – | 7 |
| Dixie State | 1 | – | 7 | 1 | – | 10 |
$ – Conference champion; # – Provisional Division II member; Rankings from AFCA Poll

2011 Lone Star Conference football standings
| | Conf. | | | Overall |
| Team | W | | L | W | | L |
|---|---|---|---|---|---|---|
| No. 7 Midwestern State $^ | 8 | – | 0 | 10 | – | 1 |
| No. 16 Abilene Christian ^ | 7 | – | 1 | 8 | – | 3 |
| No. 25 West Texas A&M # | 6 | – | 2 | 8 | – | 3 |
| Tarleton State | 5 | – | 3 | 6 | – | 5 |
| Texas A&M–Kingsville | 4 | – | 4 | 6 | – | 5 |
| Angelo State | 2 | – | 6 | 5 | – | 6 |
| Incarnate Word | 2 | – | 6 | 2 | – | 8 |
| Eastern New Mexico † | 1 | – | 7 | 2 | – | 9 |
| Texas A&M–Commerce | 1 | – | 7 | 1 | – | 9 |
+ – Conference co-champions; ^ – NCAA Division II playoff participant; # – Kanza Bowl participant † – Eastern New Mexico vacated both wins; Rankings from AFCA poll

2011 Mid-America Intercollegiate Athletics Association football standings
| | Conf. | | | Overall |
| Team | W | | L | W | | L |
|---|---|---|---|---|---|---|
| No. 1 Pittsburg State $^ | 8 | – | 1 | 13 | – | 1 |
| No. 5 NW Missouri State ^ | 7 | – | 2 | 11 | – | 3 |
| No. 11 Washburn ^ | 7 | – | 2 | 10 | – | 3 |
| No. 18 Missouri Western ^ | 7 | – | 2 | 9 | – | 3 |
| Central Missouri # | 6 | – | 3 | 8 | – | 4 |
| Emporia State | 3 | – | 6 | 5 | – | 6 |
| Fort Hays State | 3 | – | 6 | 4 | – | 7 |
| Truman | 2 | – | 7 | 4 | – | 7 |
| Missouri Southern | 2 | – | 7 | 3 | – | 7 |
| Lincoln (MO) | 0 | – | 9 | 1 | – | 9 |
$ – Conference champion; ^ – NCAA Division II playoff participant; # – Kanza Bowl participant; Rankings from AFCA poll

2011 NCAA Division II Super Region 4 independents football records
| | Conf. | | | Overall |
| Team | W | | L | W | | L |
|---|---|---|---|---|---|---|
| Lindenwood @ | | – | | 8 | – | 3 |
| Northeastern State # | | – | | 7 | – | 5 |
| Southwest Baptist | | – | | 6 | – | 5 |
| OK Panhandle State | | – | | 3 | – | 7 |
| Central Oklahoma | | – | | 2 | – | 9 |
# – Mineral Water Bowl participant @ – Provisional Division II member; Rankings from AFCA Poll

== Conference summaries ==
Conference Champions

Central Intercollegiate Athletic Association – Winston-Salem State
Great American Conference – Ouachita Baptist
Great Lakes Football Conference – Urbana
Great Lakes Intercollegiate Athletic Conference – Hillsdale
Great Northwest Athletic Conference – Humboldt State
Gulf South Conference – Delta State
Lone Star Conference – Midwestern State
Mid-America Intercollegiate Athletic Association – Pittsburg State
Northeast-10 Conference – New Haven
Northern Sun Intercollegiate Conference – Minnesota–Duluth (North) and Minnesota State–Mankato (South)
Pennsylvania State Athletic Conference – Kutztown
Rocky Mountain Athletic Conference – CSU Pueblo
South Atlantic Conference – Lenoir-Rhyne and Mars Hill
Southern Intercollegiate Athletic Conference – Miles
West Virginia Intercollegiate Athletic Conference – Concord (WV)

== Postseason ==
2011 NCAA Division II Football Championship
- Teams: 24
- Finals Site: Braly Municipal Stadium; Florence, AL
- Champion: Pittsburg State; (2nd title, title game)
- Runner-up: Wayne State (MI); (1st title game)
- Semifinalists: Delta State; Winston-Salem State
- Winning coach: championship

The 2011 NCAA Division II Football Championship playoffs were the 38th single-elimination tournament to determine the national champion of men's NCAA Division II college football. The championship game was held at Braly Municipal Stadium in Florence, Alabama for the 24th time.

=== Seeded teams ===
- CSU Pueblo
- Delta State
- Mars Hill
- Midwestern State
- Nebraska–Kearney
- New Haven
- Pittsburg State
- Winston-Salem State

=== Playoff bracket ===
First Round; November 19; Campus Sites | Second Round; November 26; Campus Sites
1 | Delta State* | 42
5 | North Alabama | 14
5 | North Alabama | 43
4 | West Alabama* | 27
Super Region 2
2 | Mars Hill* | 38
3 | North Greenville | 52
3 | North Greenville* | 63
6 | Albany State | 14
1 | Midwestern State* | 31
5 | NW Missouri State† | 38
5 | NW Missouri State | 35
4 | Missouri Western* | 29
Super Region 4
2 | Pittsburg State* | 31
3 | Washburn | 22
3 | Washburn* | 52
6 | Abilene Christian | 49
1 | Winston-Salem State* | 35
5 | California (PA) | 28
5 | California (PA)* | 44
4 | Elizabeth City State | 0
Super Region 1
2 | New Haven* | 44
3 | Kutztown | 37
3 | Kutztown* | 17
6 | Concord | 14
1 | CSU Pueblo* | 21
4 | Minnesota–Duluth | 24
4 | Minnesota–Duluth*† | 30
5 | Saginaw Valley State | 27
Super Region 3
2 | Nebraska–Kearney* | 14
6 | Wayne State (MI) | 38
6 | Wayne State (MI) | 48
3 | St. Cloud State* | 38

Quarterfinals; December 3 Campus Sites
1 | Delta State* | 28
3 | North Greenville | 23
5 | NW Missouri State | 16
2 | Pittsburg State* | 41
1 | Winston-Salem State* | 27
2 | New Haven | 7
4 | Minnesota–Duluth* | 25
6 | Wayne State (MI) | 31

Semifinals; December 10; Campus Sites
1 | Delta State | 23
2 | Pittsburg State* | 49
1 | Winston-Salem State* | 14
6 | Wayne State (MI) | 21

National Championship Game; December 17; Braly Municipal Stadium, Florence, Alabama
2 | Pittsburg State | 35
6 | Wayne State (MI) | 21

* Home team † Overtime

== See also ==
- 2011 NCAA Division I FBS football season
- 2011 NCAA Division I FCS football season
- 2011 NCAA Division III football season
- 2011 NAIA football season
