= 2011 Incarnate Word Cardinals football team =

American college football season

2011 Incarnate Word Cardinals football
- Conference: Lone Star Conference
- Record: 2–8 (2–6 Lone Star)
- Head coach: Mike Santiago (3rd season; first seven games); Todd Ivicic (interim; remainder of season)
- Offensive coordinator: Tony Marciano (2nd season)
- Offensive scheme: Multiple
- Defensive coordinator: Todd Ivicic (3rd season; first seven games); Brian Gamble (interim; remainder of season)
- Base defense: 4–2–5
- Home stadium: Gayle and Tom Benson Stadium

2011 Lone Star Conference football standings
| | Conf. | | | Overall |
| Team | W | | L | W | | L |
|---|---|---|---|---|---|---|
| No. 7 Midwestern State $^ | 8 | – | 0 | 10 | – | 1 |
| No. 16 Abilene Christian ^ | 7 | – | 1 | 8 | – | 3 |
| No. 25 West Texas A&M # | 6 | – | 2 | 8 | – | 3 |
| Tarleton State | 5 | – | 3 | 6 | – | 5 |
| Texas A&M–Kingsville | 4 | – | 4 | 6 | – | 5 |
| Angelo State | 2 | – | 6 | 5 | – | 6 |
| Incarnate Word | 2 | – | 6 | 2 | – | 8 |
| Eastern New Mexico † | 1 | – | 7 | 2 | – | 9 |
| Texas A&M–Commerce | 1 | – | 7 | 1 | – | 9 |
+ – Conference co-champions; ^ – NCAA Division II playoff participant; # – Kanza Bowl participant † – Eastern New Mexico vacated both wins; Rankings from AFCA poll

The 2011 Incarnate Word Cardinals football team represented the University of the Incarnate Word in the 2011 NCAA Division II football season. Home games were played at Gayle and Tom Benson Stadium. They finished the season 2–9, 1–7 in Lone Star play to finish in a tie for sixth place.

The Cardinals were led by third-year head coach Mike Santiago for the first seven games. On October 25, Santiago announced that he and the university mutually agreed to part ways, citing "philosophical differences".

== Schedule ==
| Date | Time | Opponent | Site | Result | Attendance |
|---|---|---|---|---|---|
| September 3 | 7:00 pm | East Central* | Gayle and Tom Benson Stadium; San Antonio, TX | L 21–31 | 3,122 |
| September 10 | 7:00 pm | Eastern New Mexico | Gayle and Tom Benson Stadium; San Antonio, TX | W 41–28 | 2,396 |
| September 17 | 7:00 pm | at Lamar* | Provost Umphrey Stadium; Beaumont, TX | L 35–45 | 15,367 |
| September 24 | 6:00 pm | at No. 21 West Texas A&M | Kimbrough Memorial Stadium; Canyon, TX | L 7–52 | 6,138 |
| October 1 | 7:00 pm | No. 22 Midwestern State | Gayle and Tom Benson Stadium; San Antonio, TX | L 14–45 | 3,129 |
| October 8 | 6:00 pm | at Texas A&M Commerce | Memorial Stadium; Commerce, TX | W 23–22 | 1,514 |
| October 15 | 7:00 pm | Texas A&M–Kingsville | Gayle and Tom Benson Stadium; San Antonio, TX | L 38–41 | 5,667 |
| October 29 | 6:00 pm | at Tarleton State | Memorial Stadium; Stephenville, TX | L 10–48 | 5,517 |
| November 5 | 7:00 pm | Angelo State^{†} | Gayle and Tom Benson Stadium; San Antonio, TX | L 14–34 | 3,948 |
| November 12 | 1:00 pm | at No. 12 Abilene Christian | Shotwell Stadium; Abilene, TX | L 16–61 | 5,115 |
*Non-conference game; ^{†}Homecoming; Rankings from Coaches' Poll released prior to the game; All times are in Central time
