= 2011 CSU Pueblo ThunderWolves football team =

American college football season

2011 CSU Pueblo ThunderWolves football

RMAC Champions

NCAA Division II Second Round vs. Minnesota–Duluth, L 21–24
- Conference: Rocky Mountain Athletic Conference

Ranking
- AFCA: No. 9
- Record: 11–1 (9–0 RMAC)
- Head coach: John Wristen (4th season)
- Offensive scheme: Pro spread
- Defensive coordinator: Hunter Hughes (4th season)
- Base defense: 3–4
- Home stadium: Neta and Eddie DeRose ThunderBowl

2011 Rocky Mountain Athletic Conference football standings
	Conf.			Overall
Team	W		L	W		L
No. 9 CSU Pueblo $^	9	–	0	11	–	1
No. 10 Nebraska–Kearney ^	8	–	1	10	–	2
Colorado Mines	6	–	3	8	–	3
Chadron State	6	–	3	6	–	5
Adams State	4	–	5	6	–	5
Western New Mexico	4	–	5	5	–	6
Colorado Mesa	3	–	6	4	–	7
New Mexico Highlands	2	–	7	4	–	7
Fort Lewis	2	–	7	3	–	8
Western State (CO)	1	–	8	1	–	10
$ – Conference champion; ^ – NCAA Division II playoff participant; Rankings from AFCA poll

The 2011 CSU Pueblo ThunderWolves football team represented Colorado State University Pueblo in the 2011 NCAA Division II football season. They were led by fifth year head coach John Wristen and played their home games at Neta and Eddie DeRose ThunderBowl. They were a member of the Rocky Mountain Athletic Conference.

== Schedule ==
Date	Time	Opponent	Rank	Site	Result	Attendance
September 1	6:00 pm	at No. 19 West Texas A&M*		Kimbrough Memorial Stadium; Canyon, TX	W 26–24	7,953
September 10	6:00 pm	Northwestern Oklahoma State*	No. 21	Neta and Eddie DeRose ThunderBowl; Pueblo, CO	W 41–0	6,123
September 17	7:00 pm	at Adams State	No. 18	Rex Stadium; Alamosa, CO	W 20–11	3,584
September 24	6:00 pm	Fort Lewis^{†}	No. 14	Neta and Eddie DeRose ThunderBowl; Pueblo, CO	W 47–0	6,707
October 1	1:30 pm	at Chadron State	No. 14	Elliott Field; Chadron, NE	W 38–28	4,316
October 6	6:00 pm	Colorado Mines	No. 11	Neta and Eddie DeRose ThunderBowl; Pueblo, CO	W 23–6	9,445
October 15	1:00 pm	at No. 4 Nebraska–Kearney	No. 11	Ron & Carol Cope Stadium; Kearney, NE	W 27–14	5,896
October 22	6:00 pm	Colorado Mesa	No. 8	Neta and Eddie DeRose ThunderBowl; Pueblo, CO	W 27–7	6,737
October 29	6:00 pm	at New Mexico Highlands	No. 7	Perkins Stadium; Las Vegas, NM	W 37–0	875
November 5	2:00 pm	Western State	No. 4	Neta and Eddie DeRose ThunderBowl; Pueblo, CO	W 41–3	6,456
November 12	2:00 pm	Western New Mexico	No. 2	Neta and Eddie DeRose ThunderBowl; Pueblo, CO	W 48–7	6,212
November 26	12:00 pm	No. 9 Minnesota–Duluth*	No. 1	Neta and Eddie DeRose ThunderBowl; Pueblo, CO (NCAA Division II Second Round)	L 21–24	9,117
*Non-conference game; ^{†}Homecoming; Rankings from AFCA Poll released prior to the game; All times are in Mountain time

== Rankings ==
Ranking movements Legend: ██ Increase in ranking ██ Decrease in ranking RV = Received votes ( ) = First-place votes
	Week												
Poll	Pre	1	2	3	4	5	6	7	8	9	10	11	Final
AFCA poll	RV	21	18	14	14	11	11	8	7	4	2	1 (16)	9
