= Jonas Randolph =

American football player (born 1990)

Profile
- Position: Running back

Personal information
- Born: December 1, 1990 (age 35)
- Listed height: 5 ft 8 in (1.73 m)
- Listed weight: 188 lb (85 kg)

Career information
- High school: Daleville (AL)
- College: Mars Hill
- NFL draft: 2012: undrafted

Career history
- Bloomington Edge (2012)

Awards and highlights
- Harlon Hill Trophy (2011)

Jonas Randolph (born December 1, 1990) is an American former football player who won the Harlon Hill Trophy in December 2011.

== Early life ==
Randolph graduated from Daleville High School in Daleville, Alabama. At Daleville, Randolph won all-state honors as a running back in his senior year, and was honorable mention all-state in his junior year.

== Mars Hill College ==
While playing as a running back for the Mars Hill College Lions he rushed for 5,608 career yards, a school record and South Atlantic Conference record. In his 2011 senior season he led Mars Hill to the South Atlantic Conference title and its first NCAA Division II playoff appearance. In his senior season Randolph rushed for 2,170 yards, including 197.27 yards per game – more than any other player that season in any NCAA division. He had 366 carries and scored 18 touchdowns. In 2009, he rushed for an average of 180.4 yards per game, second to Joique Bell in NCAA Division II. Randolph became a father two days before winning the Harlon Hill Trophy. He topped his closest rival, quarterback Dane Simoneau of Washburn University, by a vote of 120 to 117 — the closest vote in Harlon Hill history. Micah Davis of Delta State University had 101 votes. He is the first athlete from the South Atlantic Conference to win the Harlon Hill Trophy. Randolph is 5 feet, 8 inches tall and weighed 185 pounds during his senior football season.

Among his other honors was being named to the Division II American Football Coaches Association All-America Team in 2009, 2010 and 2011 — he is only the second person to have achieved that honor three times.

== College statistics ==
Year	G	Rushing Attempt	Rushing Yards	Rushing TD	Pass Receptions	Pass Reception Yards	Pass Reception TDs
2008	10	52	267	3	7	88	0
2009	10	312	1804	19	11	40	0
2010	11	250	1349	13	16	208	2
2011	11	366	2170	18	14	107	1
Career	42	980	5590	53	48	443	3

== Professional career ==
In May, 2012, Randolph signed with the Bloomington Edge of the Indoor Football League.
