= 2011 NCAA Division II football rankings =

The 2011 NCAA Division II football rankings are from the American Football Coaches Association (AFCA). This is for the 2011 season.

== Legend ==
	Increase in ranking
	Decrease in ranking
	Not ranked previous week
(#–#)	Win–loss record
(Italics)	Number of first place votes
т	Tied with team above or below also with this symbol

== American Football Coaches Association poll ==
	Preseason	Week 1 Sept 6	Week 2 Sept 13	Week 3 Sept 20	Week 4 Sept 27	Week 5 Oct 4	Week 6 Oct 11	Week 7 Oct 18	Week 8 Oct 25	Week 9 Nov 1	Week 10 Nov 8	Week 11 Nov 15	Week 12 Postseason	
1.	Minnesota–Duluth	Minnesota–Duluth (1–0) (28)	Minnesota–Duluth (2–0) (27)	Northwest Missouri State (3–0) (26)	Northwest Missouri State (4–0) (28)	North Alabama (5–0) (26)	North Alabama (6–0) (28)	Delta State (7–1) (23)	Delta State (8–1) (25)	Delta State (8–1) (25)	Delta State (9–1) (27)	CSU Pueblo (11–0) (16)	Pittsburg State (13–1) (29)	1.
2.	Delta State	Northwest Missouri State (1–0) (1)	Northwest Missouri State (2–0) (2)	North Alabama (3–0) (2)	North Alabama (4–0)	Bloomsburg (5–0)	Delta State (6–1) (1)	Bloomsburg (7–0) (4)	Bloomsburg (8–0) (1)	Pittsburg State (8–0) (3)	CSU Pueblo (10–0)	Midwestern State (10–0) (11)	Wayne State (MI) (12–4)	2.
3.	Northwest Missouri State	Abilene Christian (1–0)	Abilene Christian (1–0)	Shepherd (3–0)	Shepherd (4–0)	Delta State (5–1) (1)	Bloomsburg (6–0)	Washburn (7–0) (1)	Pittsburg State (8–0) (2)	Northwest Missouri State (8–1) (1)	Midwestern State (9–0) (1)	Winston–Salem State (11–0) (2)	Winston–Salem State (13–1)	3.
4.	Abilene Christian	Grand Valley State (1–0)	North Alabama (2–0)	Bloomsburg (3–0)	Valdosta State (4–0)	Nebraska–Kearney (5–0)	Nebraska–Kearney (6–0)	Pittsburg State (7–0) (1)	Northwest Missouri State (7–1) (1)	CSU Pueblo (9–0)	Winston–Salem State (10–0) (1)	Nebraska–Kearney (10–1)	Delta State (11–3)	4.
5.	Grand Valley State	North Alabama (1–0)	Texas A&M–Kingsville (2–0)	Valdosta State (3–0)	Bloomsburg (4–0)	Washburn (5–0)	Washburn (6–0)	North Alabama (6–1)	North Alabama (6–1)	Midwestern State (8–0)	Nebraska–Kearney (9–1)	New Haven (10–1)	Northwest Missouri State (11–3)	5.
6.	North Alabama	Texas A&M–Kingsville (1–0)	Albany State (2–0)	Delta State (3–1)	Delta State (4–1)	Wayne State (MI) (5–0)	Wayne State (MI) (6–0)	Northwest Missouri State (6–1)	Minnesota–Duluth (7–1)	St. Cloud State (8–1)	Washburn (9–1)	Kutztown (10–1)	Minnesota–Duluth (11–3)	6.
7.	Texas A&M–Kingsville	Albany State (1–0)	Shepherd (2–0)	Nebraska–Kearney (3–0)	Nebraska–Kearney (4–0)	Northwest Missouri State (4–1) (1)	Pittsburg State (6–0)	Minnesota–Duluth (6–1)	CSU Pueblo (8–0)	Winston–Salem State (9–0)	New Haven (9–1)	Pittsburg State (9–1)	Midwestern State (10–1)	7.
8.	Augustana (SD)	Shepherd (1–0)	Bloomsburg (2–0)	Washburn (3–0)	Washburn (4–0)	Pittsburg State (5–0) (1)	Northwest Missouri State (5–1)	CSU Pueblo (7–0)	Midwestern State (7–0)	Nebraska–Kearney (8–1)	Kutztown (9–1)	Delta State (9–2)	New Haven (11–2)	8.
9.	Albany State т	Bloomsburg (1–0)	St. Cloud State (2–0)	Wayne State (MI) (3–0)	Wayne State (MI) (4–0)	Minnesota–Duluth (4–1)	Minnesota–Duluth (5–1)	Abilene Christian (5–1)	Winston–Salem State (8–0)	Washburn (8–1)	Pittsburg State (8–1)	Minnesota–Duluth (9–2)	CSU Pueblo (11–1)	9.
10.	Bloomsburg т	St. Cloud State (1–0)	Delta State (2–1)	Abilene Christian (1–1)	Minnesota–Duluth (3–1)	Abilene Christian (3–1)	Abilene Christian (4–1)	Valdosta State (6–1)	Nebraska–Kearney (7–1)	New Haven (8–1)	Minnesota–Duluth (8–2)	Northwest Missouri State (9–2)	Nebraska–Kearney (10–2)	10.
11.	Shepherd	Delta State (1–1)	Nebraska–Kearney (2–0)	Minnesota–Duluth (2–1)	Abilene Christian (2–1)	CSU Pueblo (5–0)	CSU Pueblo (6–0)	Winston–Salem State (7–0)	St. Cloud State (7–1)	West Virginia Wesleyan (9–0)	Northwest Missouri State (8–2)	Abilene Christian (8–2)	Washburn (10–3)	11.
12.	California (PA)	Central Missouri (1–0)	Valdosta State (2–0)	Kutztown (3–0)	Kutztown (4–0)	Albany State (4–1)	Valdosta State (5–1)	Midwestern State (6–0)	Washburn (7–1)	Bloomsburg (8–1)	Abilene Christian (7–2)	North Alabama (8–2)	North Greenville (11–3)	12.
13.	St. Cloud State	Nebraska–Kearney (1–0)	Washburn (2–0)	Albany State (2–1)	Albany State (3–1)	Valdosta State (4–1)	Winston–Salem State (6–0)	Nebraska–Kearney (6–1)	New Haven (7–1)	Kutztown (8–1)	North Alabama (7–2)	Humboldt State (9–1)	Kutztown (11–2)	13.
14.	Wingate	Valdosta State (1–0)	Wayne State (MI) (2–0)	CSU Pueblo (3–0)	CSU Pueblo (4–0)	Shepherd (4–1)	California (PA) (5–1)	St. Cloud State (6–1)	West Virginia Wesleyan (8–0)	Slippery Rock (8–1)	Humboldt State (8–1)	St. Cloud State (9–2)	North Alabama (9–3)	14.
15.	Central Missouri	Washburn (1–0)	Grand Valley State (1–1)	Pittsburg State (3–0)	Pittsburg State (4–0)	California (PA) (4–1)	Midwestern State (5–0)	Humboldt State (6–0)	Wayne State (MI) (7–1)	Minnesota–Duluth (7–2)	St. Cloud State (8–2)	Washburn (9–2)	California (PA) (10–3)	15.
16.	Nebraska–Kearney	Augustana (SD) (0–1)	Kutztown (2–0)	Texas A&M–Kingsville (2–1)	California (PA) (3–1)	Winston–Salem State (5–0)	St. Cloud State (5–1)	New Haven (6–1)	Kutztown (7–1)	Abilene Christian (6–2)	Albany State (8–2)	Missouri Western State (9–2)	Abilene Christian (8–3)	16.
17.	Mercyhurst	Wayne State (MI) (1–0)	Carson–Newman (2–0)	California (PA) (2–1)	St. Cloud State (3–1)	St. Cloud State (4–1)	West Texas A&M (4–1)	Wayne State (MI) (6–1)	Valdosta State (6–2)	North Alabama (6–2)	Missouri Western State (8–2)	California (PA) (9–2)	St. Cloud State (9–3)	17.
18.	Washburn	Mercyhurst (1–0)	CSU Pueblo (2–0)	St. Cloud State (2–1)	Edinboro (4–0)	Midwestern State (4–0)	New Haven (5–1)	West Virginia Wesleyan (7–0)	Slippery Rock (7–1)	West Alabama (7–2)	California (PA) (8–2)	Bloomsburg (9–2)	Missouri Western State (9–3)	18.
19.	West Texas A&M	Kutztown (1–0)	Pittsburg State (2–0)	Edinboro (3–0)	Central Missouri (3–1)	Central Missouri (4–1)	Humboldt State (5–0)	Kutztown (6–1)	Abilene Christian (5–2)	Humboldt State (7–1)	West Virginia Wesleyan (9–1)	Mars Hill (8–2)	Mars Hill (8–3)	19.
20.	Valdosta State	Carson–Newman (1–0)	Colorado Mines (2–0)	Central Missouri (2–1)	West Texas A&M (2–1)	West Texas A&M (3–1)	Kutztown (5–1)	Bemidji State (6–1)	West Texas A&M (5–2)	West Texas A&M (6–2)	Colorado Mines (8–2)	North Greenville (9–2)	Humboldt State (9–1)	20.
21.	Wayne State (MI)	CSU Pueblo (1–0)	California (PA) (1–1)	West Texas A&M (1–1)	Winston–Salem State (4–0)	New Haven (4–1)	West Virginia Wesleyan (6–0)	Mars Hill (6–1)	Humboldt State (6–1)	Albany State (7–2)	Bloomsburg (8–2)	Shepherd (9–2)	Bloomsburg (9–2)	21.
22.	Central Washington	California (PA) (0–1)	Michigan Tech (2–0)	Winston–Salem State (3–0)	Midwestern State (3–0)	Hillsdale (4–1)	West Alabama (5–1)	Slippery Rock (6–1)	Albany State (6–2)	California (PA) (7–2)	Wayne State (MI) (8–2)	West Alabama (8–3)	Shepherd (9–2)	22.
23.	Kutztown	Wingate (0–1)	New Haven (2–0)	Northern Michigan (3–0)	New Haven (3–1)	Kutztown (4–1)	Bemidji State (5–1)	Ashland (5–2)	West Alabama (6–2)	Colorado Mines (7–2)	Mars Hill (7–2)	Central Missouri (8–3)	West Alabama (8–4)	23.
24.	Henderson State	Colorado Mines (1–0)	Central Missouri (1–1)	Bemidji State (3–0)	Hillsdale (3–1)	Humboldt State (4–0)	Wayne State (NE) (5–1)	West Texas A&M (4–2)	California (PA) (6–2)	Wayne State (MI) (7–2)	Slippery Rock (8–2)	West Virginia Wesleyan (9–2)	West Virginia Wesleyan (9–2)	24.
25.	Hillsdale т	Pittsburg State (1–0)	Mercyhurst (1–1)	Carson–Newman (2–1) т	Ouachita Baptist (3–0)	Edinboro (4–1)	Mars Hill (5–1)	Albany State (5–2)	Colorado Mines (6–2)	Mars Hill (7–2) т	Saginaw Valley State (7–2)	Grand Valley State (8–3)	West Texas A&M (8–3)	25.
26.	Shaw т			New Haven (2–1) т						Missouri Western State (7–2) т				26.
	Preseason	Week 1 Sept 6	Week 2 Sept 13	Week 3 Sept 20	Week 4 Sept 27	Week 5 Oct 4	Week 6 Oct 11	Week 7 Oct 18	Week 8 Oct 25	Week 9 Nov 1	Week 10 Nov 8	Week 11 Nov 15	Week 12 Postseason	
		Dropped: 19 West Texas A&M; 22 Central Washington; 24 Henderson State; 25 Hillsdale; 25 Shaw	Dropped: 16 Augustana (SD); 23 Wingate	Dropped: 15 Grand Valley State; 20 Colorado Mines; 22 Michigan Tech; 25 Mercyhurst	Dropped: 16 Texas A&M–Kingsville; 23 Northern Michigan; 24 Bemidji State; 25 Carson–Newman	Dropped: 25 Ouachita Baptist	Dropped: 12 Albany State; 14 Shepherd; 19 Central Missouri; 22 Hillsdale; 25 Edinboro	Dropped: 14 California (PA); 22 West Alabama; 24 Wayne State (NE)	Dropped: 20 Bemidji State; 21 Mars Hill; 23 Ashland	Dropped: 17 Valdosta State	Dropped: 18 West Alabama; 20 West Texas A&M	Dropped: 16 Albany State; 20 Colorado Mines; 22 Wayne State (MI); 24 Slippery Rock; 25 Saginaw Valley State	Dropped: 23 Central Missouri; 25 Grand Valley State	
