= 2011 West Texas A&M Buffaloes football team =

American college football season

2011 West Texas A&M Buffaloes football

Kanza Bowl champion

Kanza Bowl, W 26–7 vs. Central Missouri
- Conference: Lone Star Conference

Ranking
- AFCA: No. 25
- Record: 8–3 (6–2 LSC)
- Head coach: Don Carthel (7th season)
- Offensive coordinator: Stephen Lee (1st season)
- Offensive scheme: Air raid
- Defensive coordinator: Colby Carthel (6th season)
- Base defense: 3–4
- Home stadium: Kimbrough Memorial Stadium

2011 Lone Star Conference football standings
	Conf.			Overall
Team	W		L	W		L
No. 7 Midwestern State $^	8	–	0	10	–	1
No. 16 Abilene Christian ^	7	–	1	8	–	3
No. 25 West Texas A&M #	6	–	2	8	–	3
Tarleton State	5	–	3	6	–	5
Texas A&M–Kingsville	4	–	4	6	–	5
Angelo State	2	–	6	5	–	6
Incarnate Word	2	–	6	2	–	8
Eastern New Mexico †	1	–	7	2	–	9
Texas A&M–Commerce	1	–	7	1	–	9
+ – Conference co-champions; ^ – NCAA Division II playoff participant; # – Kanza Bowl participant † – Eastern New Mexico vacated both wins; Rankings from AFCA poll

The 2011 West Texas A&M Buffaloes football team represented West Texas A&M University during the 2010 NCAA Division II football season as a member of the Lone Star Conference (LSC). Led by seventh-year head coach Don Carthel, the Buffaloes played their home games at Kimbrough Memorial Stadium in Canyon, Texas.

The team finished the regular season with an overall record of 7–3 with a LSC record of 6–2, finishing third in the conference. For just the second time under Carthel, the Buffs failed to receive a bid for the NCAA Division II Playoffs. Instead, the team was invited to the Kanza Bowl, where they defeated Central Missouri 26–7.

== Offseason ==
=== Coaching changes ===
In January 2011, offensive coordinator and quarterbacks coach Mike Nesbitt was hired for the same position with the Stephen F. Austin Lumberjacks. Nesbitt was replaced by Stephen Lee, who previously served as co-offensive coordinator/passing game coordinator and quarterbacks coach at Brenham High School in Brenham, Texas.

== Schedule ==
Date	Time	Opponent	Rank	Site	Result	Attendance
September 1	6:00 p.m.	CSU Pueblo*	No. 19	Kimbrough Memorial Stadium; Canyon, TX	L 24–26	7,935
September 17	8:00 p.m.	vs. No. 5 Texas A&M–Kingsville		Cowboys Stadium; Arlington, TX (LSC Football Festival)	W 42–21	24,837
September 24	6:00 p.m.	Incarnate Word	No. 21	Kimbrough Memorial Stadium; Canyon, TX	W 52–7	6,138
October 1	7:00 p.m.	at Tarleton State	No. 20	Memorial Stadium; Stephenville, TX	W 44–13	7,534
October 8	6:00 p.m.	Angelo State^{†}	No. 20	Kimbrough Memorial Stadium; Canyon, TX	W 19–7	14,577
October 15	2:00 p.m.	at No. 10 Abilene Christian	No. 17	Shotwell Stadium; Abilene, TX	L 18–28	10,246
October 22	6:00 p.m.	Eastern New Mexico	No. 24	Kimbrough Memorial Stadium; Canyon, TX (Wagon Wheel)	W 52–21	8,413
October 29	6:00 p.m.	Central Washington*	No. 20	Kimbrough Memorial Stadium; Canyon, TX	W 49–35	4,427
November 5	2:00 p.m.	at No. 5 Midwestern State	No. 20	Memorial Stadium; Wichita Falls, TX	L 21–35	10,820
November 12	1:00 p.m.	Texas A&M–Commerce		Kimbrough Memorial Stadium; Canyon, TX (East Texas vs. West Texas)	W 49–0	3,630
November 27	1:00 p.m.	vs. No. 23 Central Missouri*		Hummer Sports Complex; Topeka, KS (Kanza Bowl)	W 26–7	465
*Non-conference game; ^{†}Homecoming; Rankings from AFCA Poll released prior to the game; All times are in Central time

== Rankings ==
Ranking movements Legend: ██ Increase in ranking ██ Decrease in ranking — = Not ranked
	Week												
Poll	Pre	1	2	3	4	5	6	7	8	9	10	11	Final
AFCA	19	—	—	21	20	20	17	24	20	20	—	—	25

== Game summaries ==
=== CSU Pueblo ===
	1	2	3	4	Total
ThunderWolves	0	17	3	6	26
No. 19 Buffaloes	10	7	7	0	24

=== Vs. No. 5 Texas A&M–Kingsville (LSC Football Festival) ===
	1	2	3	4	Total
Buffaloes	10	10	15	7	42
No. 5 Javelinas	0	7	14	0	21

=== Incarnate Word ===
	1	2	3	4	Total
Cardinals	0	7	0	0	7
No. 21 Buffaloes	14	10	21	7	52

=== At Tarleton State ===
	1	2	3	4	Total
No. 20 Buffaloes	9	7	21	7	44
Texans	10	3	0	0	13

=== Angelo State ===
	1	2	3	4	Total
Rams	0	0	0	7	7
No. 20 Buffaloes	0	7	3	9	19

=== At No. 10 Abilene Christian ===
	1	2	3	4	Total
No. 17 Buffaloes	3	7	0	8	18
No. 10 Wildcats	0	14	7	7	28

=== Eastern New Mexico ===
	1	2	3	4	Total
Greyhounds	0	0	7	14	21
No. 24 Buffaloes	14	14	14	10	52

=== Central Washington ===
	1	2	3	4	Total
Wildcats	7	14	7	7	35
No. 20 Buffaloes	7	14	14	14	49

=== At No. 5 Midwestern State ===
	1	2	3	4	Total
No. 20 Buffaloes	7	0	14	0	21
No. 5 Mustangs	7	14	7	7	35

=== Texas A&M–Commerce ===
	1	2	3	4	Total
Lions	0	0	0	0	0
Buffaloes	21	14	7	7	49

=== Vs. No. 23 Central Missouri (Kanza Bowl) ===
	1	2	3	4	Total
Buffaloes	7	13	3	3	26
No. 23 Mules	7	0	0	0	7

== Personnel ==
2011 West Texas A&M Buffaloes football team roster
Players
Coaches
Offense

Pos.	#	Name	Class
QB	4	Luke Halpin	So
RB	5	Khiry Robinson	Jr
WR	8	Nate Slaughter	So
WR	9	Brittan Golden	Sr
QB	10	Dustin Vaughan	So
WR	11	Torrence Allen	So
WR	14	Jace Jackson	So
QB	16	Tanner Marsh	Jr
WR	17	Lance Ratliff	So
WR	19	Luke Russell	So

Defense

Pos.	#	Name	Class
DB	1	Jordan Smith	Jr
DL	2	Tyrell Higgins	Jr
DB	3	Caleb Randolph	Sr
LB	6	Bryan Johnson	Sr
DB	7	Mario Goins	So
DL	12	Jonathan Hatton	Sr
DB	15	Torian Oakley	Fr
DB	18	Tarin Lee	So
LB	20	Anthony Scott	Sr

Special teams

Pos.	#	Name	Class
P, K	13	Kevin Vanvoris	So
P, K	41	Sergio Castillo	So
DS	54	Ramon Lopez	Jr

Head coach

- Don Carthel

Coordinators/assistant coaches

- Stephen Lee
  Offensive coordinator/quarterbacks
- Colby Carthel
  Defensive coordinator
- Joel Hinton
  Wide receivers
- Nick Paremski
  Secondary
- Matt Storm
  Offensive line
- Caid Faske
  Defensive tackles

Legend

- (C) Team captain
- (S) Suspended
- (I) Ineligible
- Injured
- Redshirt

Roster
Last update: October 17, 2024
