= Corey White =

Corey White may refer to:

- Corey White (American football)
- Corey White (comedian)
