= 2011 North Alabama Lions football team =

American college football season

2011 North Alabama Lions football

NCAA Division II Second Round, L 14–42 at Delta State
- Conference: Gulf South Conference
- Record: 9–4 (2–2 GSC)
- Head coach: Terry Bowden (3rd season)
- Offensive coordinator: Alan Arrington (4th season)
- Defensive coordinator: Tony Pecoraro (2nd season)
- Home stadium: Braly Municipal Stadium

2011 Gulf South Conference football standings
	Conf.			Overall
Team	W		L	W		L
No. 4 Delta State $^	3	–	1	11	–	3
No. 14 North Alabama ^	2	–	2	9	–	4
No. 23 West Alabama ^	2	–	2	8	–	4
West Georgia	2	–	2	6	–	4
Valdosta State	1	–	3	6	–	4
$ – Conference champion; ^ – NCAA Division II playoff participant; Rankings from AFCA poll

The 2011 North Alabama Lions football team represented the University of North Alabama as a member of the Gulf South Conference (GSC) during the 2011 NCAA Division II football season. Led by Terry Bowden in his third and final season as head coach, the Lions compiled an overall record of 9–4 with a mark of 2–2 in conference play, placing in a three-way tie for second in the GSC. For the seventh straight season, North Alabama advanced to the NCAA Division II football championship playoffs, where the Lions defeated conference foe West Alabama in the first round before losing to GSC champion Delta State in the second round. The team played home games at Braly Municipal Stadium in Florence, Alabama.

Bowden was named the head football coach at the university of Akron in December 2011.

== Schedule ==
Date	Time	Opponent	Rank	Site	TV	Result	Attendance
September 1	6:00 pm	Central Oklahoma*	No. 6	Braly Municipal Stadium; Florence, AL	CSS	W 31–10	11,072
September 10	6:00 pm	Glenville State*	No. 5	Braly Municipal Stadium; Florence, AL		W 48–21	9,711
September 17	4:00 pm	vs. No. 3 Abilene Christian*	No. 4	Cowboys Stadium; Arlington, TX	WHDF	W 23–17	24,837
September 24	6:00 pm	Harding*^{†}	No. 2	Braly Municipal Stadium; Florence, AL		W 28–20	9,327
October 1	6:00 pm	at Southern Arkansas*	No. 2	Wilkins Stadium; Magnolia, AR		W 42–14	1,402
October 8	6:00 pm	at Arkansas Tech*	No. 1	Buerkle Field; Russellville, AR		W 44–10	5,750
October 13	7:00 pm	No. 2 Delta State	No. 1	Braly Municipal Stadium; Florence, AL	CSS, ESPN3	L 24–30 ^{OT}	11,101
October 27	7:00 pm	at No. 23 West Alabama	No. 5	Tiger Stadium; Livingston, AL (rivalry)	CSS, ESPN3	L 26–31	7,827
November 5	4:00 pm	West Georgia	No. 17	Braly Municipal Stadium; Florence, AL		W 28–3	7,958
November 12	1:00 pm	at Valdosta State	No. 13	Bazemore–Hyder Stadium; Valdosta, GA		W 30–23	4,227
November 19	12:00 pm	at No. 22 West Alabama	No. 12	Tiger Stadium; Livingston, AL (NCAA Division II First Round)		W 43–27	6,925
November 26	1:00 pm	at No. 8 Delta State	No. 12	McCool Stadium; Cleveland, MS (NCAA Division II Second Round)		L 14–42	5,125
*Non-conference game; ^{†}Homecoming; Rankings from AFCA Poll released prior to the game; All times are in Central time
