= 2011 Abilene Christian Wildcats football team =

American college football season

2011 Abilene Christian Wildcats football

NCAA Division II Second Round, L 49–52 vs. Washburn
- Conference: Lone Star Conference

Ranking
- AFCA: No. 16
- Record: 8–3 (7–1 LSC)
- Head coach: Chris Thomsen (7th season)
- Offensive coordinator: Ken Collums (7th season)
- Offensive scheme: Spread
- Defensive coordinator: Jason Johns (6th season)
- Base defense: 3–4
- Home stadium: Shotwell Stadium

2011 Lone Star Conference football standings
| | Conf. | | | Overall |
| Team | W | | L | W | | L |
|---|---|---|---|---|---|---|
| No. 7 Midwestern State $^ | 8 | – | 0 | 10 | – | 1 |
| No. 16 Abilene Christian ^ | 7 | – | 1 | 8 | – | 3 |
| No. 25 West Texas A&M # | 6 | – | 2 | 8 | – | 3 |
| Tarleton State | 5 | – | 3 | 6 | – | 5 |
| Texas A&M–Kingsville | 4 | – | 4 | 6 | – | 5 |
| Angelo State | 2 | – | 6 | 5 | – | 6 |
| Incarnate Word | 2 | – | 6 | 2 | – | 8 |
| Eastern New Mexico † | 1 | – | 7 | 2 | – | 9 |
| Texas A&M–Commerce | 1 | – | 7 | 1 | – | 9 |
+ – Conference co-champions; ^ – NCAA Division II playoff participant; # – Kanza Bowl participant † – Eastern New Mexico vacated both wins; Rankings from AFCA poll

The 2011 Abilene Christian Wildcats football team was an American football team that represented Abilene Christian University (ACU) as a member of the Lone Star Conference (LSC) during the 2011 NCAA Division II football season. In their seventh season under head coach Chris Thomsen, the Wildcats compiled an overall record of 8–3 record with a mark of 7–1 in conference play, placing second in the LSC. Abilene Christian advanced to the NCAA Division II Football Championship playoffs, where the Wildcats lost to Washburn in the first round, 52–49. The team played home games at Shotwell Stadium in Abilene, Texas.

== Schedule ==
| Date | Time | Opponent | Rank | Site | Result | Attendance |
|---|---|---|---|---|---|---|
| September 1 | 7:00 p.m. | at Tarleton State | No. 4 | Memorial Stadium; Stephenville, TX | W 27–24 | 6,412 |
| September 17 | 4:00 p.m. | vs. No. 4 North Alabama* | No. 3 | Cowboys Stadium; Arlington, TX | L 17–23 | 24,837 |
| September 24 | 6:00 p.m. | Angelo State | No. 10 | Shotwell Stadium; Abilene, TX | W 31–17 | 6,837 |
| October 1 | 6:00 p.m. | Western Oregon* | No. 11 | Shotwell Stadium; Abilene, TX | W 51–35 | 5,233 |
| October 8 | 3:00 p.m. | at Eastern New Mexico | No. 10 | Greyhound Stadium; Portales, NM | W 36–7 | 4,297 |
| October 15 | 2:00 p.m. | No. 17 West Texas A&M | No. 10 | Shotwell Stadium; Abilene, TX | W 28–18 | 10,246 |
| October 22 | 8:00 p.m. | at No. 12 Midwestern State | No. 9 | Memorial Stadium; Wichita Falls, TX | L 28–70 | 9,821 |
| October 29 | 2:00 p.m. | Texas A&M–Commerce | No. 19 | Shotwell Stadium; Abilene, TX | W 40–28 | 7,524 |
| November 5 | 7:00 p.m. | at Texas A&M–Kingsville | No. 16 | Javelina Stadium; Kinsgville, TX | W 42–34 | 6,500 |
| November 12 | 1:00 p.m. | Incarnate Word | No. 12 | Shotwell Stadium; Abilene, TX | W 61–16 | 5,115 |
| November 19 | 1:00 p.m. | at No. 15 Washburn | No. 11 | Yager Stadium; Topeka, KS | L 49–52 | 4,410 |
*Non-conference game; Rankings from AFCA Poll released prior to the game; All times are in Central time
