= 2011 California Vulcans football team =

American college football season

2011 California Vulcans football

PSAC West Division co-champion

NCAA Division II Second Round, L 28-35 at Winston-Salem State
- Conference: Pennsylvania State Athletic Conference
- West Division

Ranking
- AFCA: No. 15
- Record: 10–3 (6–1 PSAC)
- Head coach: John Luckhardt (10th season)
- Offensive coordinator: Chad Salisbury (3rd season)
- Home stadium: Adamson Stadium

2011 Pennsylvania State Athletic Conference football standings
	Conf.			Overall
Team	W		L	W		L
East
No. 13 Kutztown xy$^	6	–	1	11	–	2
C. W. Post x	6	–	1	7	–	4
No. 21 Bloomsburg	5	–	2	9	–	2
Shippensburg	4	–	3	7	–	4
West Chester	4	–	3	5	–	6
Millersville	2	–	5	3	–	8
East Stroudsburg	1	–	6	3	–	8
Cheyney	0	–	7	1	–	10
West
No. 15 California (PA) x^	6	–	1	10	–	3
Slippery Rock xy	6	–	1	8	–	3
IUP	5	–	2	7	–	3
Edinboro	4	–	3	7	–	4
Gannon	3	–	4	4	–	7
Mercyhurst	2	–	5	4	–	7
Clarion	2	–	5	3	–	8
Lock Haven	0	–	7	0	–	10
Championship: Kutztown 21, Slippery Rock 14
x – Division champion/co-champions; y – Championship game participant; ^ – NCAA Division II playoff participant; Rankings from AFCA poll

The 2011 California Vulcans football team represented California University of Pennsylvania as a member of the West Division of the Pennsylvania State Athletic Conference (PSAC) during the 2011 NCAA Division II football season. Led by John Luckhardt in his tenth and final season as head coach, California compiled an overall record of 10–4 with a mark of 6–1 in conference play, sharing the PSAC West Division title with Slippery Rock. The Vulcans advanced to the NCAA Division II Football Championship playoffs, where they beat Elizabeth City State in the first round before losing to Winston-Salem State in the second round. The team's offense scored 405 points while the defense allowed 209 points. The Vulcans played home games at Adamson Stadium in California, Pennsylvania.

== Schedule ==
Date	Time	Opponent	Rank	Site	Result	Attendance
September 1	7:00 p.m.	No. 13 St. Cloud State*	No. 12	Adamson Stadium; California, PA	L 3–26	5,233
September 10	3:30 p.m.	C. W. Post*	No. 22	Adamson Stadium; California, PA	W 41–13	2,721
September 17	6:00 p.m.	at East Stroudsburg*	No. 21	Eiler-Martin Stadium; East Stroudsburg, PA	W 22–19	1,442
September 24	3:30 p.m.	Clarion	No. 17	Adamson Stadium; California, PA	W 40–13	2,941
October 1	7:30 p.m.	at Lock Haven	No. 16	Hubert Jack Stadium; Lock Haven, PA	W 54–13	589
October 8	3:30 p.m.	Gannon	No. 15	Adamson Stadium; California, PA	W 33–6	2,735
October 15	2:00 p.m.	at Slippery Rock	No. 14	Mihalik-Thompson Stadium; Slippery Rock, PA	L 3–17	9,724
October 22	3:30 p.m.	Mercyhurst^{†}		Adamson Stadium; California, PA	W 32–26 ^{OT}	3,261
October 29	1:00 p.m.	at IUP	No. 24	Miller Stadium; Indiana, PA (Coal Bowl)	W 28–10	856
November 5	3:30 p.m.	Edinboro	No. 22	Adamson Stadium; California, PA	W 34–28	3,790
November 12	1:00 p.m.	at Cheyney*	No. 18	O'Shields-Stevenson Stadium; Cheyney, PA	W 43–3	311
November 19	12:00 p.m.	Elizabeth City State*	No. 17	Adamson Stadium; California, PA (NCAA Division II First Round)	W 44–0	2,227
November 26	1:00 p.m.	at No. 3 Winston-Salem State*	No. 17	Bowman Gray Stadium; Winston-Salem, NC (NCAA Division Second Round)	L 28–35	7,645
*Non-conference game; ^{†}Homecoming; Rankings from AFCA Poll released prior to the game; All times are in Eastern time
