= List of CSU Pueblo ThunderWolves football seasons =

This is a list of seasons completed by the CSU Pueblo ThunderWolves football team of the National Collegiate Athletic Association. The first team in 1938 was coached by Dale Rea. Colorado State University Pueblo stopped sponsoring football after the 1984 school year and brought it back for 2008.

== Division history ==
Year	Division
1938–1962	Junior college
1963–1968	NAIA
1969–1975	NCAA College Division (NCAA Division II)
NAIA
2008–present	NCAA Division II

== Seasons ==
Legend

^{†} National champions
^{‡} Conference champions
^{#} Division champions
^ Bowl game berth
* Playoff berth

Season	Coach	Conference	Conference results				Season results			Bowl/playoff result	Final ranking
Season	Coach	Conference	Finish	Wins	Losses	Ties	Wins	Losses	Ties	Bowl/playoff result	AFCA poll
CSU Pueblo ThunderWolves football seasons
1938	Dale Rea			1	2	0	1	3	2	—	N/A
1939	Dale Rea			2	1	0	2	4	0	—	N/A
1940	Dale Rea			0	2	0	3	2	1	—	N/A
1941	Jack Johnson			0	2	0	0	6	1	—	N/A
1942	Dan Lawrence			1	2	0	1	4	0	—	N/A
1943–1945	There was no team from 1943 through 1945 due to World War II										
1946	Maurice "Red" Elder			—	—	—	5	4	0	—	N/A
1947	Maurice "Red" Elder			3	1	1	3	3	1	—	N/A
1948	Maurice "Red" Elder			4	1	1	7	1	1	—	N/A
1949	Maurice "Red" Elder			2	2	1	5	3	1	—	N/A
1950	Maurice "Red" Elder			3	2	0	4	6	0	—	N/A
1951	Maurice "Red" Elder			1	5	0	1	8	0	—	N/A
1952	Harry Simmons			2	4	0	2	6	1	—	N/A
1953	Harry Simmons			5	3	0	6	3	0	—	N/A
1954	Harry Simmons			5	3	0	5	4	0	—	N/A
1955	Harry Simmons			3	3	1	3	4	1	—	N/A
1956	Joe Prater			5	2	0	5	3	0	—	N/A
1957	Joe Prater			3	3	1	4	5	1	—	N/A
1958	Joe Prater			2	5	0	3	6	0	—	N/A
1959	Joe Prater			2	3	1	4	4	1	—	N/A
1960	Joe Prater			4	3	0	6	4	0	—	N/A
1961	Joe Prater			3	4	0	4	6	0	—	N/A
1962	Joe Prater			3	3	0	7	3	0	—	N/A
1963	Joe Prater	Independent		—	—	—	3	5	0	—	N/A
1964	Joe Prater	Independent		—	—	—	6	4	0	—	N/A
1965	Joe Prater	Independent		—	—	—	8	1	1	—	N/A
1966	Joe Prater	Independent		—	—	—	3	7	0	—	N/A
1967	Joe Prater	Independent		—	—	—	3	6	1	—	N/A
1968	Joe Prater	Independent		—	—	—	4	6	0	—	N/A
1969	Joe Prater	RMAC		3	2	0	7	2	0	—	N/A
1970	Joe Prater	RMAC		1	4	0	5	5	0	—	N/A
1971	Joe Prater	RMAC		1	4	0	4	6	0	—	N/A
1972	Joe Prater	GPAC		3	3	0	6	4	0	—	N/A
1973	Joe Prater	GPAC		1	4	0	3	7	0	—	N/A
1974	Mike Friedman	GPAC		1	4	0	3	6	0	—	N/A
1975	Mike Friedman	GPAC		3	2	0	4	5	0	—	N/A
1976	Mike Friedman	RMAC	3rd/ of 10	5	2	0	6	4	1	—	N/A
1977	Mike Friedman	RMAC	T–7th/ of 10	2	7	0	3	7	0	—	N/A
1978	Mike Friedman	RMAC	Ineligible/ of 10	—	—	—	8	2	0	—	N/A
1979	Mike Friedman	RMAC	2nd/ of 9	6	2	0	8	2	0	—	N/A
1980	Mike Friedman	RMAC	T–1st/ of 9	7	1	0	9	1	0	—	N/A
1981	Mike Friedman	RMAC	8th/ of 9	2	6	0	4	6	0	—	N/A
1982*	Mike Friedman	RMAC	2nd/ of 9	7	1	0	9	2	0	Lost to Central Oklahoma, 20-61, in NAIA quarterfinals	N/A
1983	Mike Friedman	RMAC	2nd/ of 9	6	1	1	6	3	1	—	N/A
1984	Gary Richardson	RMAC	T–5th/ of 9	2	6	0	2	8	0	—	N/A
1985–2007	CSU–Pueblo did not sponsor football from 1985 through the 2007 school years.										
2008	John Wristen	RMAC	T–6th/ of 10	3	6	—	4	6	—	—	—
2009	John Wristen	RMAC	T–3rd/ of 10	6	3	—	7	4	—	—	—
2010	John Wristen	RMAC	T–3rd/ of 10	7	2	—	9	2	—	—	RV
2011^{‡}*	John Wristen	RMAC	1st/ of 10	9	0	—	11	1	—	Lost to Minnesota-Duluth, 21-24, in NCAA D-II second round	9th
2012^{‡}*	John Wristen	RMAC	1st/ of 10	9	0	—	12	1	—	Lost to West Texas A&M, 13-34, in NCAA D-II quarterfinals	6th
2013^{‡}*	John Wristen	RMAC	1st/ of 10	9	0	—	11	1	—	Lost to Grand Valley State, 30-34, in NCAA D-II second round	7th
2014^{‡}*^{†}	John Wristen	RMAC	T–1st/ of 10	8	1	—	14	1	—	Won against Minnesota State University, Mankato, 13-0, in NCAA D-II Championship Game	1st
2015^{‡}*	John Wristen	RMAC	8th/ of 10 (Note: Championship nullified due to self-reported NCAA violation)	9	0	—	12	2	—	Lost to Grand Valley State, 7-31, in NCAA D-II quarterfinals	5th
2016^{‡}	John Wristen	RMAC	T–1st/ of 11	8	2	—	8	3	—	—	RV
2017^{‡}*	John Wristen	RMAC	T–1st/ of 11	9	1	—	9	3	—	Lost to Minnesota State-Mankato, 13-16, in NCAA D-II first round	17
2018^{‡}*	John Wristen	RMAC	T–1st/ of 11	9	1	—	11	2	—	Lost to Minnesota State, 10-24, in NCAA D-II second round	7
2019*	John Wristen	RMAC	2nd/ of 11	9	1	—	11	2	—	Lost to Minnesota State, 7-35, in NCAA D-II second round	12
2020	John Wristen	Season cancelled due to COVID-19 pandemic									
2021	John Wristen	RMAC	5th/ of 10	6	3	—	6	5	—	—	N/A
2022*	John Wristen	RMAC	T–2nd/ of 10	7	2	—	8	4	—	Lost to Colorado School of Mines, 24-45, in NCAA D-II first round	RV
2023	Phil Vigil	RMAC	3rd/ of 10	7	2	—	8	3	—	—	N/A
2024^{‡}*	Phil Vigil	RMAC	1st/ of 10	9	0	—	10	2	—	Lost to Minnesota State, 23-26, in NCAA D-II second round	8
2025^{‡}*	Phil Vigil	RMAC	1st/ of 10	9	0	—	10	2	—	Lost to UT Permian Basin, 24-37, in NCAA D-II first round	11
Total				?	?	7	347	224	15	(only includes regular season games)	
Total				—	—	—	0	1	—	(only includes NAIA playoff games; 1 appearance)	
Total				—	—	—	9	10	—	(only includes NCAA Division II playoff games; 4 appearances)	
Total				?	?	7	356	234	15	(all games)	
♦ Denotes a tie for first place and conference co-champion
