= List of Rocky Mountain Athletic Conference football standings =

This is a list of yearly Rocky Mountain Athletic Conference football standings.

== Standings ==
1967 Rocky Mountain Conference football standings
	Conf.					Overall
Team	W		L		T	W		L		T
Adams State $	3	–	0	–	0	8	–	1	–	0
Colorado State–Greeley	2	–	1	–	0	6	–	2	–	1
Western State (CO)	1	–	2	–	0	4	–	5	–	0
Colorado Mines	0	–	3	–	0	1	–	7	–	1
$ – Conference champion

1968 Rocky Mountain Athletic Conference football standings
	Conf.					Overall
Team	W		L		T	W		L		T
Adams State $	3	–	0	–	0	8	–	1	–	0
Colorado State–Greeley	1	–	1	–	0	5	–	3	–	0
Western State (CO)	1	–	2	–	0	3	–	6	–	0
Colorado Mines	0	–	2	–	0	4	–	4	–	0
$ – Conference champion

1969 Rocky Mountain Athletic Conference football standings
	Conf.					Overall
Team	W		L		T	W		L		T
Mountain Division
Adams State * xy	6	–	1	–	0	7	–	3	–	0
Western State (CO)	5	–	1	–	0	5	–	4	–	0
Westminster (UT)	3	–	3	–	0	4	–	5	–	0
Southern Utah	2	–	3	–	0	4	–	5	–	0
Colorado Mines	1	–	3	–	0	3	–	6	–	0
Western New Mexico	1	–	4	–	0	1	–	7	–	0
Fort Lewis	1	–	5	–	0	1	–	7	–	0
Plains Division
Colorado State–Greeley xy$	5	–	0	–	0	10	–	0	–	0
Emporia State	4	–	2	–	0	6	–	3	–	0
Southern Colorado	3	–	2	–	0	7	–	2	–	0
Washburn	3	–	3	–	0	5	–	5	–	0
Nebraska–Omaha	2	–	2	–	0	3	–	6	–	0
Pittsburg State	2	–	3	–	0	5	–	5	–	0
Fort Hays State	0	–	6	–	0	0	–	9	–	0
Championship: Colorado State–Greeley 33, Adams State 14
$ – Conference champion; x – Division champion/co-champions; y – Championship game participant; * Adams State received a non-conference forfeit win from Eastern New Mexico.

1970 Rocky Mountain Athletic Conference football standings
	Conf.					Overall
Team	W		L		T	W		L		T
Mountain Division
Western New Mexico xy	5	–	1	–	0	5	–	4	–	0
Southern Utah x	5	–	1	–	0	6	–	3	–	0
Adams State	4	–	2	–	0	4	–	3	–	2
Westminster (UT)	3	–	3	–	0	4	–	6	–	0
Western State (CO)	2	–	4	–	0	2	–	7	–	0
Fort Lewis	1	–	5	–	0	1	–	8	–	0
Colorado Mines	1	–	5	–	0	1	–	9	–	0
Plains Division
No. 20 Pittsburg State xy$	4	–	1	–	0	9	–	2	–	0
Northern Colorado x	4	–	1	–	0	7	–	2	–	0
Nebraska–Omaha	4	–	2	–	0	4	–	5	–	1
Fort Hays State	2	–	3	–	0	5	–	5	–	0
Southern Colorado	1	–	4	–	0	5	–	5	–	0
Emporia State	1	–	4	–	0	1	–	8	–	0
Washburn *	0	–	0	–	0	5	–	3	–	2
Championship: Pittsburg State 52, Western New Mexico 6
$ – Conference champion; x – Division champion/co-champions; y – Championship game participant; * – Washburn was ineligible for conference title; Rankings from NAIA Division I poll

1971 Rocky Mountain Athletic Conference football standings
	Conf.					Overall
Team	W		L		T	W		L		T
Mountain Division
Western State (CO) x	5	–	1	–	0	6	–	2	–	1
Adams State xy	5	–	1	–	0	5	–	5	–	0
Southern Utah	3	–	3	–	0	5	–	5	–	0
Western New Mexico	3	–	3	–	0	3	–	5	–	0
Colorado Mines	2	–	4	–	0	2	–	8	–	0
Westminster (UT)	2	–	4	–	0	4	–	4	–	0
Fort Lewis	1	–	5	–	0	2	–	7	–	0
Plains Division
Northern Colorado xy$	5	–	0	–	0	8	–	1	–	1
Pittsburg State	3	–	1	–	1	8	–	1	–	1
Nebraska–Omaha	2	–	2	–	1	5	–	4	–	1
Emporia State	1	–	3	–	1	3	–	6	–	1
Fort Hays State	1	–	3	–	1	2	–	7	–	1
Southern Colorado	1	–	4	–	0	4	–	6	–	0
Washburn *	0	–	0	–	0	5	–	5	–	0
Championship: Northern Colorado 25, Adam State 15
$ – Conference champion; x – Division champion/co-champions; y – Championship game participant; * – Washburn was ineligible for conference title

1972 Rocky Mountain Athletic Conference football standings
	Conf.					Overall
Team	W		L		T	W		L		T
Adams State $	5	–	1	–	0	6	–	3	–	0
Western State (CO)	4	–	2	–	0	6	–	3	–	0
Southern Utah	4	–	2	–	0	6	–	3	–	0
Colorado Mines	3	–	3	–	0	4	–	5	–	0
Western New Mexico	3	–	3	–	0	3	–	5	–	0
Westminster (UT)	1	–	5	–	0	3	–	6	–	0
Fort Lewis	1	–	5	–	0	2	–	6	–	0
$ – Conference champion

1973 Rocky Mountain Athletic Conference football standings
	Conf.					Overall
Team	W		L		T	W		L		T
Western State (CO) $	5	–	1	–	0	6	–	3	–	0
Adams State	4	–	2	–	0	6	–	3	–	0
Southern Utah	4	–	2	–	0	5	–	4	–	0
Fort Lewis	3	–	3	–	0	4	–	5	–	0
Western New Mexico	3	–	3	–	0	3	–	5	–	0
Westminster (UT)	2	–	4	–	0	3	–	6	–	0
Colorado Mines	0	–	6	–	0	0	–	9	–	0
$ – Conference champion

1974 Rocky Mountain Athletic Conference football standings
	Conf.					Overall
Team	W		L		T	W		L		T
Western State (CO) $	5	–	1	–	0	6	–	3	–	0
Westminster (UT)	3	–	3	–	0	6	–	3	–	0
Adams State	3	–	3	–	0	5	–	4	–	0
Fort Lewis	3	–	3	–	0	4	–	5	–	0
Southern Utah	3	–	3	–	0	3	–	6	–	0
Western New Mexico	2	–	4	–	0	4	–	5	–	0
Colorado Mines	2	–	4	–	0	3	–	6	–	0
New Mexico Highlands *	0	–	0	–	0	4	–	5	–	0
$ – Conference champion; * – ineligible for conference standings

1975 Rocky Mountain Athletic Conference football standings
	Conf.					Overall
Team	W		L		T	W		L		T
Western State (CO) $	7	–	0	–	0	9	–	1	–	0
No. 15 Adams State	6	–	1	–	0	6	–	3	–	0
Colorado Mines	5	–	2	–	0	6	–	4	–	0
Fort Lewis	4	–	3	–	0	6	–	3	–	0
Western New Mexico	3	–	4	–	0	4	–	5	–	0
Westminster (UT)	2	–	5	–	0	4	–	5	–	0
Southern Utah	1	–	6	–	0	3	–	6	–	0
Mesa	0	–	7	–	0	0	–	8	–	0
$ – Conference champion; Rankings from NAIA Division I poll

1976 Rocky Mountain Athletic Conference football standings
	Conf.					Overall
Team	W		L		T	W		L		T
No. 3 Western State (CO) $^	9	–	0	–	0	9	–	2	–	0
No. 14 Fort Lewis	7	–	2	–	0	7	–	2	–	0
Southern Colorado	5	–	2	–	0	6	–	4	–	1
Southern Utah	4	–	5	–	0	5	–	5	–	0
Colorado Mines	3	–	4	–	0	5	–	4	–	0
Mesa	3	–	5	–	0	4	–	5	–	1
Westminster (UT)	3	–	5	–	0	4	–	5	–	0
Western New Mexico	3	–	5	–	0	3	–	7	–	0
Adams State	3	–	6	–	0	3	–	6	–	0
New Mexico Highlands	1	–	7	–	0	1	–	8	–	0
$ – Conference champion; ^ – NAIA Division I playoff participant; Rankings from NAIA Division I poll

1977 Rocky Mountain Athletic Conference football standings
	Conf.					Overall
Team	W		L		T	W		L		T
No. 12 Western State (CO) $	8	–	1	–	0	8	–	1	–	0
No. 14 Mesa	7	–	1	–	1	8	–	1	–	1
Southern Utah	7	–	2	–	0	8	–	2	–	0
Fort Lewis	6	–	2	–	1	6	–	2	–	1
Westminster (UT)	5	–	4	–	0	5	–	4	–	0
Adams State	3	–	6	–	0	3	–	7	–	0
Colorado Mines	2	–	7	–	0	3	–	7	–	0
Southern Colorado *	2	–	7	–	0	3	–	7	–	0
New Mexico Highlands	2	–	7	–	0	2	–	8	–	0
Western New Mexico	2	–	7	–	0	2	–	8	–	0
$ – Conference champion; * – Southern Colorado forfeited three conference wins, over Western State, Southern Utah, and Westminster; Rankings from NAIA Division I poll

1978 Rocky Mountain Athletic Conference football standings
	Conf.					Overall
Team	W		L		T	W		L		T
No. 3 Western State (CO) $^	8	–	0	–	0	10	–	1	–	0
Southern Utah	5	–	3	–	0	7	–	3	–	0
Adams State	5	–	3	–	0	6	–	4	–	0
Western New Mexico	5	–	3	–	0	5	–	4	–	0
Fort Lewis	4	–	4	–	0	4	–	6	–	0
Mesa	4	–	4	–	0	4	–	6	–	0
Westminster (UT)	2	–	6	–	0	2	–	7	–	0
Colorado Mines	2	–	6	–	0	3	–	7	–	0
New Mexico Highlands	1	–	7	–	0	1	–	9	–	0
Southern Colorado *	0	–	0	–	0	8	–	2	–	0
$ – Conference champion; ^ – NAIA Division I playoff participant * – ineligible for conference title; Rankings from NAIA Division I poll

1979 Rocky Mountain Athletic Conference football standings
	Conf.					Overall
Team	W		L		T	W		L		T
No. 6 Western State (CO) $^	7	–	1	–	0	8	–	2	–	0
No. 14 Southern Colorado	6	–	2	–	0	8	–	2	–	0
Colorado Mines	5	–	3	–	0	6	–	4	–	0
Adams State	4	–	4	–	0	5	–	5	–	0
Fort Lewis	4	–	4	–	0	5	–	5	–	0
Southern Utah	3	–	5	–	0	4	–	6	–	0
New Mexico Highlands	3	–	5	–	0	3	–	7	–	0
Western New Mexico	2	–	6	–	0	2	–	7	–	0
Mesa	1	–	7	–	0	1	–	8	–	0
$ – Conference champion; ^ – NAIA Division I playoff participant; Rankings from NAIA Division I poll

1980 Rocky Mountain Athletic Conference football standings
	Conf.					Overall
Team	W		L		T	W		L		T
No. 9 Southern Colorado +	7	–	1	–	0	8	–	1	–	0
No. 10 Adams State +	7	–	1	–	0	8	–	3	–	0
Southern Utah	6	–	2	–	0	6	–	3	–	0
Western State (CO)	5	–	3	–	0	6	–	4	–	0
Colorado Mines	3	–	5	–	0	4	–	5	–	0
New Mexico Highlands	3	–	5	–	0	4	–	6	–	0
Mesa	3	–	5	–	0	3	–	6	–	0
Fort Lewis	2	–	6	–	0	2	–	7	–	0
Western New Mexico	0	–	8	–	0	1	–	8	–	0
+ – Conference co-champions; Rankings from NAIA Division I poll

1981 Rocky Mountain Athletic Conference football standings
	Conf.					Overall
Team	W		L		T	W		L		T
No. 19 New Mexico Highlands $	7	–	1	–	0	7	–	3	–	0
Mesa	6	–	2	–	0	7	–	3	–	0
No. 20 Southern Utah	6	–	2	–	0	7	–	3	–	0
Western State (CO)	5	–	3	–	0	5	–	4	–	0
Adams State	3	–	4	–	1	3	–	5	–	1
Fort Lewis	3	–	5	–	0	3	–	7	–	0
Southern Colorado	2	–	6	–	0	4	–	6	–	0
Colorado Mines	2	–	5	–	1	3	–	5	–	1
Western New Mexico	1	–	7	–	0	1	–	8	–	0
$ – Conference champion; Rankings from NAIA Division I poll

1982 Rocky Mountain Athletic Conference football standings
	Conf.					Overall
Team	W		L		T	W		L		T
No. 4 Mesa $^	7	–	0	–	1	11	–	1	–	1
No. 5 Southern Colorado ^	7	–	1	–	0	9	–	2	–	0
Southern Utah	5	–	1	–	2	6	–	2	–	2
Adams State	3	–	3	–	2	3	–	4	–	2
Fort Lewis	3	–	4	–	1	4	–	5	–	1
Western New Mexico	2	–	5	–	1	4	–	5	–	1
Western State (CO)	2	–	6	–	0	3	–	6	–	0
New Mexico Highlands	1	–	6	–	1	2	–	7	–	1
Colorado Mines	1	–	7	–	0	2	–	7	–	0
$ – Conference champion; ^ – NAIA Division I playoff participant; Rankings from NAIA Division I poll

1983 Rocky Mountain Athletic Conference football standings
	Conf.					Overall
Team	W		L		T	W		L		T
No. 3 Mesa $^	7	–	0	–	1	11	–	1	–	1
Southern Colorado	6	–	1	–	1	6	–	3	–	1
Western New Mexico	4	–	3	–	1	5	–	4	–	1
Southern Utah	4	–	4	–	0	5	–	5	–	0
Adams State	4	–	4	–	0	4	–	6	–	0
Fort Lewis	4	–	4	–	0	4	–	6	–	0
Colorado Mines	3	–	5	–	0	4	–	5	–	0
Western State (CO)	2	–	5	–	1	2	–	6	–	1
New Mexico Highlands	0	–	8	–	0	1	–	9	–	0
$ – Conference champion; ^ – NAIA Division I playoff participant

1984 Rocky Mountain Athletic Conference football standings
	Conf.					Overall
Team	W		L		T	W		L		T
No. 11 Fort Lewis $	7	–	0	–	1	7	–	2	–	1
No. 20 Adams State	6	–	2	–	0	6	–	3	–	0
Southern Utah	5	–	3	–	0	6	–	4	–	0
Western State (CO)	3	–	5	–	0	3	–	7	–	0
New Mexico Highlands	3	–	5	–	0	3	–	8	–	0
Colorado Mines	2	–	6	–	0	3	–	7	–	0
Southern Colorado	2	–	6	–	0	2	–	8	–	0
Mesa *	1	–	7	–	0	2	–	8	–	0
Western New Mexico **	5	–	2	–	1	7	–	2	–	1
$ – Conference champion; * – Mesa forfeited five conference wins, over Southern Colorado, Southern Utah, Western State, Colorado Mines, and Western New Mexico, due to an ineligible player ** – Western New Mexico on probation and ineligible for conference title and postseason play; Rankings from NAIA Division I poll

1985 Rocky Mountain Athletic Conference football standings
	Conf.					Overall
Team	W		L		T	W		L		T
No. 4 Mesa $^	7	–	0	–	0	9	–	2	–	0
No. 20 Fort Lewis	5	–	2	–	0	6	–	3	–	0
No. 19 New Mexico Highlands	4	–	3	–	0	7	–	3	–	0
Adams State	4	–	3	–	0	4	–	5	–	0
Southern Utah	2	–	4	–	1	3	–	5	–	0
Western New Mexico	2	–	5	–	0	3	–	7	–	0
Western State (CO)	2	–	5	–	0	2	–	7	–	0
Colorado Mines	1	–	5	–	1	2	–	5	–	1
$ – Conference champion; ^ – NAIA Division I playoff participant; Rankings from NAIA Division I poll

1986 Rocky Mountain Athletic Conference football standings
	Conf.					Overall
Team	W		L		T	W		L		T
No. 10 Mesa $^	6	–	0	–	0	7	–	3	–	1
New Mexico Highlands	4	–	2	–	0	5	–	5	–	0
Fort Lewis	4	–	2	–	0	4	–	5	–	0
Western State (CO)	2	–	3	–	1	3	–	5	–	1
Adams State	2	–	4	–	0	2	–	8	–	0
Colorado Mines	1	–	4	–	1	3	–	5	–	1
Western New Mexico	1	–	5	–	0	3	–	7	–	0
$ – Conference champion; ^ – NAIA Division I playoff participant; Rankings from NAIA Division I poll

1987 Rocky Mountain Athletic Conference football standings
	Conf.					Overall
Team	W		L		T	W		L		T
No. 4 Mesa $^	6	–	0	–	0	11	–	1	–	0
Adams State *	4	–	2	–	0	5	–	6	–	0
No. 20 New Mexico Highlands	3	–	2	–	1	5	–	3	–	1
Western New Mexico	3	–	3	–	0	5	–	5	–	0
Fort Lewis	3	–	3	–	0	3	–	6	–	0
Western State (CO)	1	–	5	–	0	2	–	8	–	0
Colorado Mines	0	–	5	–	1	3	–	5	–	1
$ – Conference champion; ^ – NAIA Division I playoff participant * – Adams State forfeited three victories including a conference win over Western New Mexico; Rankings from NAIA Division I poll

1988 Rocky Mountain Athletic Conference football standings
	Conf.					Overall
Team	W		L		T	W		L		T
No. 3 Mesa State $^	5	–	0	–	0	8	–	2	–	0
No. 16 Adams State ^	3	–	1	–	1	10	–	3	–	1
No. 23 Western New Mexico	2	–	2	–	1	4	–	4	–	1
Western State (CO)	2	–	3	–	0	4	–	5	–	0
Colorado Mines	2	–	3	–	0	3	–	7	–	0
Fort Lewis	0	–	5	–	0	1	–	8	–	0
$ – Conference champion; ^ – NAIA Division I playoff participant; Rankings from NAIA Division I poll

1989 Rocky Mountain Athletic Conference football standings
	Conf.					Overall
Team	W		L		T	W		L		T
No. 1 Adams State $^	7	–	0	–	0	9	–	2	–	0
No. 5 Mesa State	6	–	1	–	0	9	–	1	–	0
No. 17 Western New Mexico	5	–	2	–	0	7	–	4	–	0
Western State (CO)	2	–	5	–	0	3	–	7	–	0
Colorado Mines	1	–	6	–	0	3	–	7	–	0
Fort Lewis	1	–	6	–	0	1	–	9	–	0
Chadron State *†	0	–	0	–	0	8	–	2	–	0
Kearney State *	0	–	0	–	0	4	–	6	–	0
Wayne State (NE) *	0	–	0	–	0	4	–	7	–	0
Fort Hays State *	0	–	0	–	0	3	–	7	–	0
$ – Conference champion; ^ – NAIA Division I playoff participant † – NAIA Division II playoff participant * – ineligible for conference title; Rankings from NAIA Division I poll

1990 Rocky Mountain Athletic Conference football standings
	Conf.					Overall
Team	W		L		T	W		L		T
No. 6 Mesa State $^	4	–	0	–	0	8	–	4	–	0
Adams State	3	–	1	–	0	5	–	4	–	0
Colorado Mines	1	–	3	–	0	5	–	5	–	0
Western State (CO)	1	–	3	–	0	3	–	7	–	0
Fort Lewis	1	–	3	–	0	2	–	7	–	0
$ – Conference champion; ^ – NAIA Division I playoff participant; Rankings from NAIA Division I poll

1991 Rocky Mountain Athletic Conference football standings
	Conf.					Overall
Team	W		L		T	W		L		T
No. 5 Western State (CO) $^	6	–	0	–	0	10	–	2	–	0
No. 11 Fort Hays State	4	–	2	–	0	8	–	3	–	0
Colorado Mines	3	–	3	–	0	6	–	4	–	0
Chadron State	3	–	3	–	0	5	–	5	–	1
Mesa State	3	–	3	–	0	3	–	7	–	0
No. 16 Adams State	2	–	4	–	0	6	–	4	–	0
Fort Lewis	0	–	6	–	0	2	–	8	–	0
New Mexico Highlands *	0	–	0	–	0	1	–	9	–	0
$ – Conference champion; ^ – NAIA Division I playoff participant * – ineligible for conference title; Rankings from NAIA Division I poll

1992 Rocky Mountain Athletic Conference football standings
	Conf.					Overall
Team	W		L		T	W		L		T
Western State (CO) $^	7	–	0	–	0	9	–	2	–	0
Fort Hays State	6	–	1	–	0	6	–	5	–	0
Chadron State	5	–	2	–	0	7	–	3	–	0
New Mexico Highlands	4	–	3	–	0	7	–	3	–	1
Mesa State	3	–	4	–	0	3	–	8	–	0
Colorado Mines	2	–	5	–	0	4	–	6	–	0
Adams State	1	–	6	–	0	3	–	7	–	0
Fort Lewis	0	–	7	–	0	1	–	9	–	0
$ – Conference champion; ^ – NCAA Division II playoff participant

1993 Rocky Mountain Athletic Conference football standings
	Conf.					Overall
Team	W		L		T	W		L		T
Fort Hays State $^	6	–	1	–	0	8	–	4	–	0
Western State (CO)	5	–	2	–	0	8	–	3	–	0
New Mexico Highlands	5	–	2	–	0	6	–	4	–	0
Mesa State	5	–	2	–	0	5	–	5	–	0
Adams State	3	–	4	–	0	4	–	6	–	0
Chadron State	2	–	5	–	0	5	–	6	–	0
Colorado Mines	1	–	6	–	0	2	–	7	–	1
Fort Lewis	0	–	7	–	0	1	–	9	–	0
$ – Conference champion; ^ – NCAA Division II playoff participant

1994 Rocky Mountain Athletic Conference football standings
	Conf.					Overall
Team	W		L		T	W		L		T
Western State (CO) $^	6	–	1	–	0	8	–	3	–	0
Fort Hays State	5	–	1	–	1	5	–	5	–	1
Chadron State	5	–	2	–	0	9	–	2	–	0
Mesa State	4	–	3	–	0	4	–	7	–	0
Adams State	2	–	4	–	1	3	–	7	–	1
New Mexico Highlands	2	–	4	–	1	2	–	7	–	1
Fort Lewis	2	–	5	–	0	2	–	9	–	0
Colorado Mines	0	–	6	–	1	2	–	6	–	1
Nebraska–Kearney *	0	–	0	–	0	8	–	3	–	0
$ – Conference champion; ^ – NCAA Division II playoff participant; * – ineligible for conference title

1995 Rocky Mountain Athletic Conference football standings
	Conf.					Overall
Team	W		L		T	W		L		T
Fort Hays State +^	6	–	0	–	1	8	–	2	–	2
Western State (CO) +	6	–	0	–	1	7	–	2	–	1
Chadron State	5	–	2	–	0	8	–	2	–	0
Adams State	3	–	4	–	0	4	–	6	–	0
Fort Lewis	3	–	4	–	0	4	–	6	–	0
New Mexico Highlands	2	–	5	–	0	4	–	7	–	0
Mesa State	2	–	5	–	0	3	–	7	–	0
Colorado Mines	0	–	7	–	0	1	–	9	–	0
Nebraska–Kearney *	0	–	0	–	0	6	–	3	–	1
+ – Conference co-champions; ^ – NCAA Division II playoff participant; * – ineligible for conference title

1996 Rocky Mountain Athletic Conference football standings
	Conf.			Overall
Team	W		L	W		L
Chadron State $^	7	–	1	10	–	2
Western State (CO)	6	–	2	6	–	5
New Mexico Highlands	5	–	3	8	–	3
Fort Hays State	5	–	3	7	–	3
Fort Lewis	4	–	4	5	–	5
Nebraska–Kearney	4	–	4	4	–	7
Adams State	2	–	6	4	–	7
Mesa State	2	–	6	2	–	8
Colorado Mines	1	–	7	3	–	8
$ – Conference champion; ^ – NCAA Division II playoff participant

1997 Rocky Mountain Athletic Conference football standings
	Conf.			Overall
Team	W		L	W		L
Western State (CO) $^	7	–	1	9	–	3
Chadron State	6	–	2	8	–	3
New Mexico Highlands	6	–	2	8	–	3
Nebraska–Kearney	6	–	2	7	–	4
Fort Hays State	4	–	4	5	–	6
Fort Lewis	3	–	5	4	–	7
Mesa State	2	–	6	4	–	7
Colorado Mines	1	–	7	3	–	8
Adams State	1	–	7	1	–	10
$ – Conference champion; ^ – NCAA Division II playoff participant

1998 Rocky Mountain Athletic Conference football standings
	Conf.			Overall
Team	W		L	W		L
Chadron State +^	7	–	1	9	–	3
Western State (CO) +	7	–	1	7	–	3
New Mexico Highlands	6	–	2	8	–	3
Nebraska–Kearney	5	–	3	5	–	5
Fort Hays State	4	–	4	6	–	5
Adams State	3	–	5	4	–	6
Mesa State	2	–	6	5	–	6
Colorado Mines	2	–	6	3	–	7
Fort Lewis	0	–	8	0	–	10
+ – Conference co-champions; ^ – NCAA Division II playoff participant

1999 Rocky Mountain Athletic Conference football standings
	Conf.			Overall
Team	W		L	W		L
Chadron State +	7	–	1	7	–	3
New Mexico Highlands +	7	–	1	7	–	4
Nebraska–Kearney	6	–	2	7	–	3
Mesa State	4	–	4	6	–	5
Western State (CO)	4	–	4	5	–	6
Adams State	4	–	4	4	–	6
Fort Hays State	2	–	6	2	–	9
Fort Lewis	2	–	6	2	–	9
Colorado Mines	0	–	8	1	–	9
+ – Conference co-champions

2000 Rocky Mountain Athletic Conference football standings
	Conf.			Overall
Team	W		L	W		L
No. 3 Mesa State $^	8	–	0	10	–	3
No. 4 Chadron State ^	7	–	1	8	–	3
No. 6 Nebraska–Kearney	6	–	2	7	–	3
No. 9 Western State (CO)	5	–	3	6	–	5
Fort Hays State	3	–	5	5	–	5
Adams State	3	–	5	3	–	7
Fort Lewis	2	–	6	3	–	8
New Mexico Highlands	1	–	7	3	–	8
Colorado Mines	1	–	7	2	–	8
$ – Conference champion; ^ – NCAA Division II playoff participant; Rankings from AFCA West Region poll

2001 Rocky Mountain Athletic Conference football standings
	Conf.			Overall
Team	W		L	W		L
Chadron State $^	8	–	0	10	–	1
Nebraska–Kearney	7	–	1	8	–	2
Mesa State	5	–	3	7	–	4
Western State (CO)	5	–	3	6	–	5
Colorado Mines	4	–	4	7	–	4
New Mexico Highlands	3	–	5	4	–	7
Fort Hays State	2	–	6	3	–	8
Adams State	1	–	7	2	–	9
Fort Lewis	1	–	7	2	–	9
$ – Conference champion; ^ – NCAA Division II playoff participant

2002 Rocky Mountain Athletic Conference football standings
	Conf.			Overall
Team	W		L	W		L
Nebraska–Kearney +^	7	–	1	9	–	2
Chadron State +	7	–	1	8	–	2
Mesa State	5	–	3	5	–	6
Colorado Mines	4	–	4	7	–	4
Adams State	4	–	4	5	–	6
Western State (CO)	4	–	4	5	–	6
Fort Hays State	3	–	5	5	–	6
Fort Lewis	2	–	6	3	–	8
New Mexico Highlands	0	–	8	0	–	10
+ – Conference co-champions; ^ – NCAA Division II playoff participant

2003 Rocky Mountain Athletic Conference football standings
	Conf.			Overall
Team	W		L	W		L
Mesa State $^	8	–	0	10	–	2
Chadron State	6	–	2	8	–	2
Fort Hays State	5	–	3	6	–	5
Colorado Mines	4	–	4	6	–	5
Nebraska–Kearney	4	–	4	5	–	5
Western State (CO)	4	–	4	5	–	6
Adams State	3	–	5	4	–	7
Fort Lewis	2	–	6	3	–	8
New Mexico Highlands	0	–	8	0	–	11
$ – Conference champion; ^ – NCAA Division II playoff participant

2004 Rocky Mountain Athletic Conference football standings
	Conf.			Overall
Team	W		L	W		L
No. 8 Colorado Mines $^	8	–	0	12	–	1
Chadron State	6	–	2	7	–	3
Adams State	6	–	2	7	–	4
Fort Hays State	5	–	3	6	–	5
Nebraska–Kearney	4	–	4	5	–	6
Fort Lewis	3	–	5	4	–	6
New Mexico Highlands	2	–	6	3	–	8
Western State	2	–	6	3	–	8
Mesa State	0	–	8	0	–	11
$ – Conference champion; ^ – NCAA Division II playoff participant; Rankings from AFCA Poll

2005 Rocky Mountain Athletic Conference football standings
	Conf.			Overall
Team	W		L	W		L
No. 24 Nebraska–Kearney $^	7	–	1	9	–	3
Fort Lewis	6	–	2	6	–	4
Colorado Mines	6	–	2	6	–	5
Adams State	5	–	3	6	–	5
Mesa State	4	–	4	5	–	6
Chadron State	4	–	4	4	–	6
Fort Hays State	2	–	6	2	–	8
Western State	2	–	6	2	–	9
New Mexico Highlands	0	–	8	0	–	10
$ – Conference champion; ^ – NCAA Division II playoff participant; Rankings from AFCA Poll

2006 Rocky Mountain Athletic Conference football standings
	Conf.			Overall
Team	W		L	W		L
No. 5 Chadron State $^	8	–	0	12	–	1
Fort Lewis #	6	–	2	7	–	4
Nebraska–Kearney	5	–	3	6	–	4
Adams State	4	–	4	6	–	5
New Mexico Highlands	3	–	5	6	–	5
Western New Mexico	3	–	5	5	–	5
Mesa State	3	–	5	4	–	7
Colorado Mines	2	–	6	4	–	7
Western State	2	–	6	3	–	8
$ – Conference champion; ^ – NCAA Division II playoff participant; # – Dixie Rotary Bowl participant; Rankings from AFCA Poll

2007 Rocky Mountain Athletic Conference football standings
	Conf.			Overall
Team	W		L	W		L
No. 5 Chadron State $^	8	–	0	12	–	1
No. 19 Mesa State ^	7	–	1	10	–	2
Colorado Mines #	6	–	2	7	–	5
Nebraska–Kearney	5	–	3	6	–	4
Western New Mexico	4	–	4	4	–	6
New Mexico Highlands–	3	–	5	4	–	6
Adams State	2	–	6	2	–	9
Fort Lewis	1	–	7	1	–	9
Western State (CO)	0	–	8	1	–	10
$ – Conference champion; ^ – NCAA Division II playoff participant; # – Dixie Rotary Bowl participant; Rankings from AFCA poll

2008 Rocky Mountain Athletic Conference football standings
	Conf.			Overall
Team	W		L	W		L
No. 9 Chadron State $^	9	–	0	11	–	2
Colorado Mines #	7	–	2	8	–	4
Nebraska–Kearney	7	–	2	7	–	4
Mesa State	6	–	3	6	–	5
Adams State	5	–	4	5	–	6
CSU Pueblo	3	–	6	4	–	6
New Mexico Highlands	3	–	6	3	–	8
Western New Mexico	2	–	7	2	–	8
Western State	2	–	7	2	–	8
Fort Lewis	1	–	8	2	–	9
$ – Conference champion; ^ – NCAA Division II playoff participant; # – Dixie Rotary Bowl participant; Rankings from AFCA Poll

2009 Rocky Mountain Athletic Conference football standings
	Conf.			Overall
Team	W		L	W		L
No. 8 Nebraska–Kearney $^	9	–	0	11	–	2
Colorado Mines	8	–	1	8	–	3
Chadron State	6	–	3	7	–	4
CSU Pueblo	6	–	3	7	–	4
Adams State	5	–	4	5	–	6
Mesa State	5	–	4	5	–	6
Western State	3	–	6	3	–	8
Western New Mexico	1	–	8	2	–	8
Fort Lewis	1	–	8	2	–	9
New Mexico Highlands	1	–	8	1	–	10
$ – Conference champion; ^ – NCAA Division II playoff participant; Rankings from AFCA Poll

2010 Rocky Mountain Athletic Conference football standings
	Conf.			Overall
Team	W		L	W		L
No. 19 Colorado Mines +^	8	–	1	9	–	3
No. 23 Nebraska–Kearney +	8	–	1	9	–	2
CSU Pueblo	7	–	2	9	–	2
Chadron State	7	–	2	8	–	3
Adams State	4	–	5	5	–	6
Western New Mexico	3	–	6	4	–	7
Mesa State	3	–	6	3	–	7
Fort Lewis	3	–	6	3	–	7
Western State	1	–	8	1	–	10
New Mexico Highlands	1	–	8	1	–	10
+ – Conference co-champions; ^ – NCAA Division II playoff participant; Rankings from AFCA Poll

2011 Rocky Mountain Athletic Conference football standings
	Conf.			Overall
Team	W		L	W		L
No. 9 CSU Pueblo $^	9	–	0	11	–	1
No. 10 Nebraska–Kearney ^	8	–	1	10	–	2
Colorado Mines	6	–	3	8	–	3
Chadron State	6	–	3	6	–	5
Adams State	4	–	5	6	–	5
Western New Mexico	4	–	5	5	–	6
Colorado Mesa	3	–	6	4	–	7
New Mexico Highlands	2	–	7	4	–	7
Fort Lewis	2	–	7	3	–	8
Western State	1	–	8	1	–	10
$ – Conference champion; ^ – NCAA Division II playoff participant; Rankings from AFCA Poll

2012 Rocky Mountain Athletic Conference football standings
	Conf.			Overall
Team	W		L	W		L
No. 6 CSU Pueblo $^	9	–	0	12	–	1
No. 18 Chadron State ^	8	–	1	9	–	3
New Mexico Highlands	7	–	2	8	–	3
Adams State	6	–	3	8	–	3
Colorado Mines	4	–	5	6	–	5
Colorado Mesa	4	–	5	4	–	7
Black Hills State #	3	–	6	4	–	7
Western New Mexico	3	–	6	4	–	7
Western State	1	–	8	1	–	10
Fort Lewis	0	–	9	0	–	10
$ – Conference champion; ^ – NCAA Division II playoff participant; # – Provisional Division II member; Rankings from AFCA Poll

2013 Rocky Mountain Athletic Conference football standings
	Conf.			Overall
Team	W		L	W		L
No. 7 CSU Pueblo $^	9	–	0	11	–	1
Chadron State	7	–	2	8	–	3
Colorado Mines	7	–	2	8	–	3
Adams State	5	–	4	7	–	4
Colorado Mesa	4	–	5	5	–	6
Western New Mexico	4	–	5	4	–	6
Fort Lewis	3	–	6	4	–	7
Black Hills State	3	–	6	3	–	8
Western State	2	–	7	2	–	9
New Mexico Highlands	1	–	8	2	–	9
$ – Conference champion; ^ – NCAA Division II playoff participant; Rankings from AFCA Poll

2014 Rocky Mountain Athletic Conference football standings
	Conf.			Overall
Team	W		L	W		L
No. 1 CSU Pueblo +^	8	–	1	14	–	1
No. 19 Colorado Mines +^	8	–	1	10	–	2
Chadron State	7	–	2	8	–	3
Colorado Mesa	5	–	4	6	–	5
Western New Mexico	4	–	5	5	–	6
Adams State	3	–	6	4	–	7
Western State	3	–	6	4	–	7
New Mexico Highlands	3	–	6	3	–	8
Black Hills State	2	–	7	3	–	8
Fort Lewis	2	–	7	3	–	8
+ – Conference co-champions; ^ – NCAA Division II playoff participant; Rankings from AFCA Poll

2015 Rocky Mountain Athletic Conference football standings
	Conf.			Overall
Team	W		L	W		L
No. 5 CSU Pueblo $^	9	–	0	12	–	2
Colorado Mesa	8	–	1	9	–	2
Colorado Mines	6	–	3	8	–	3
Fort Lewis	6	–	3	7	–	4
Chadron State	4	–	5	5	–	6
Western State	4	–	5	4	–	7
Western New Mexico	3	–	6	4	–	7
Adams State	3	–	6	3	–	8
New Mexico Highlands	2	–	7	2	–	9
Black Hills State	0	–	9	0	–	11
$ – Conference champion; ^ – NCAA Division II playoff participant; Rankings from AFCA Poll

2016 Rocky Mountain Athletic Conference football standings
	Conf.			Overall
Team	W		L	W		L
No. 15 Colorado Mines +^	8	–	2	10	–	3
Colorado Mesa +^	8	–	2	9	–	3
CSU Pueblo +	8	–	2	8	–	3
Western State	7	–	3	7	–	4
Black Hills State	6	–	4	7	–	4
Dixie State	6	–	4	6	–	5
South Dakota Mines	4	–	6	5	–	6
Fort Lewis	3	–	7	4	–	7
Chadron State	3	–	7	3	–	8
Adams State	2	–	8	2	–	8
New Mexico Highlands	0	–	10	0	–	11
+ – Conference co-champions; ^ – NCAA Division II playoff participant; Rankings from AFCA Poll

2017 Rocky Mountain Athletic Conference football standings
	Conf.			Overall
Team	W		L	W		L
Colorado Mesa +	9	–	1	9	–	2
No. 17 CSU Pueblo +^	9	–	1	9	–	3
Colorado Mines	7	–	3	7	–	4
Chadron State	6	–	4	6	–	5
Dixie State	5	–	5	5	–	6
Fort Lewis	5	–	5	5	–	6
South Dakota Mines	4	–	6	5	–	6
Black Hills State	4	–	6	4	–	6
Adams State	4	–	6	4	–	7
New Mexico Highlands	1	–	9	2	–	9
Western Colorado	1	–	9	1	–	10
+ – Conference co-champions; ^ – NCAA Division II playoff participant; Rankings from AFCA Poll

2018 Rocky Mountain Athletic Conference football standings
	Conf.			Overall
Team	W		L	W		L
No. 7 CSU Pueblo +^	9	–	1	11	–	2
No. 18 Colorado Mines +^	9	–	1	10	–	2
Chadron State	7	–	3	7	–	3
Dixie State	7	–	3	7	–	4
Colorado Mesa	6	–	4	7	–	4
South Dakota Mines	4	–	6	5	–	6
Adams State	4	–	6	4	–	7
New Mexico Highlands	4	–	6	4	–	7
Black Hills State	2	–	8	3	–	8
Western Colorado	2	–	8	2	–	9
Fort Lewis	1	–	9	1	–	9
+ – Conference co-champions; ^ – NCAA Division II playoff participant; Rankings from AFCA Poll
