= 2014 NCAA Division II Football Championship Game =

Postseason college football game

2014 NCAA Division II Football Championship
CSU Pueblo ThunderWolves	Minnesota State Mavericks
(13–1)	(14–0)
RMAC	Northern Sun
13	0
Head coach: John Wristen	Head coach: Todd Hoffner
Seed 2	Seed 2
	1	2	3	4	Total
CSU Pueblo	0	10	3	0	13
Minnesota State	0	0	0	0	0
- Date: December 20, 2014
- Season: 2014
- Stadium: Sporting Park
- Location: Kansas City, Kansas
- Referee: Jason Autrey
- Attendance: 6,762

United States TV coverage
- Network: ESPN2

The 2014 NCAA Division II Football Championship Game was a postseason college football game that determined a national champion in NCAA Division II for the 2014 season. It was played at Sporting Park in Kansas City, Kansas, on December 20, 2014, with kickoff at 4:00 p.m. EST (3:00 p.m. local CST), and television coverage on ESPN2.

== Teams ==
The participants of the 2014 NCAA Division II Football Championship Game were the finalists of the 2014 Division II Playoffs, which began with teams seeded 3–6 in each super region playing in the first round, the winners of which faced teams seeded 1–2 in the second round. From there, the bracket was a sixteen-team single-elimination tournament. The game featured the No. 2 seed CSU Pueblo and No. 2 seed Minnesota State. This was the first meeting between the teams and both teams' first championship game appearance.

=== National semifinals ===
Semifinals; December 13; Hosted by team with asterisk
1	Concord	13
2	Minnesota State*	47
6	West Georgia	7
2	CSU Pueblo*	10

National Championship; December 20; Sporting Park, Kansas City, KS
2	Minnesota State	0
2	CSU Pueblo	13

== Game summary ==
2014 NCAA Division II Football Championship Game

Quarter	1	2	3	4	Total
No. 2 CSU Pueblo	0	10	3	0	13
No. 2 Minnesota State	0	0	0	0	0

at Sporting Park • Kansas City, Kansas

- Date: Saturday, December 20, 2014
- Game time: 4:00 p.m. EST (3:00 p.m. CST)
- Game weather: Partly sunny • Temperature: 43 °F (6 °C) • Wind: SW 15 mph
- Game attendance: 6,762
- Referee: Jason Autrey
- TV: ESPN2

Game information

First Quarter
No scoring
Second Quarter

- (7:21) CSUP – Greg O'Donnell 27 yard field goal (Drive: 9 plays, 66 yards, 3:06; CSU Pueblo 3–0)
- (0:37) CSUP – Chris Bonner 18 yard pass to Paul Browning, Greg O'Donnell kick (Drive: 10 plays, 69 yards, 4:53; CSU Pueblo 10–0)

Third Quarter

- (11:48) CSUP – Greg O'Donnell 24 yard field goal (Drive: 7 plays, 51 yards, 3:04; CSU Pueblo 13–0)

Fourth Quarter
No scoring

=== Statistics ===
Statistics	CSUP	MNST
First downs	16	12
Plays–yards	66–327	64–265
Rushes–yards	36–136	31–105
Passing yards	191	160
Passing: Comp–Att–Int	17–30–1	20–33–0
Time of possession	32:11	27:49

Team	Category	Player	Statistics
CSU Pueblo	Passing	Chris Bonner	17/30, 191 yards, 1 TD, 1 INT
CSU Pueblo	Rushing	Cameron McDondle	28 carries, 113 yards
CSU Pueblo	Receiving	Paul Browning	5 receptions, 84 yards, 1 TD
Minnesota State	Passing	Ricky Lloyd	15/21, 99 yards
Minnesota State	Rushing	Ricky Lloyd	12 carries, 67 yards
Minnesota State	Receiving	Dorian Buford	5 receptions, 50 yards
