= Ricky Lloyd =

American football player (born 1998)

No. 19
- Position: Quarterback

Personal information
- Born: December 25, 1992 (age 33)
- Listed height: 6 ft 1 in (1.85 m)
- Listed weight: 210 lb (95 kg)

Career information
- High school: Concord (Concord, California)
- College: Southern Miss (2011–2013); Minnesota State (2014–2016)
- NFL draft: 2017: undrafted

Career history
- BC Lions (2018–2020)
- Stats at CFL.ca

Ricky Lloyd (born December 25, 1992) is an American former professional football quarterback who played for the BC Lions of the Canadian Football League (CFL). He played college football for the Southern Miss Golden Eagles and Minnesota State Mavericks.

== Early life ==
Ricky Lloyd was born on December 25, 1992. He played high school football at Concord High School in Concord, California. He completed 301 passes for 4,451 yards and 52 touchdowns as a senior in 2010. He led the state of California in both completions and yards while also finishing fourth in the country in both categories. His 52 touchdowns also tied a NorCal record. Lloyd was one of seven finalist for California's Mr. Football Award.

== College career ==
Lloyd enrolled at the University of Southern Mississippi to play college football for the Southern Miss Golden Eagles. He redshirted the 2011 season. He began the 2012 season third on the depth chart at quarterback behind starter Chris Campbell and backup Anthony Alford. After injuries to both Campbell and Alford, Lloyd started his first game on September 29, 2012, against the Louisville Cardinals. Lloyd only completed two of eight passes for 25 yards in rainy conditions as the Golden Eagles lost 21–17. He also started the team's next game against Boise State, completing 12 of 21 passes for 143 yards and two interceptions in a 40–14 loss. He suffered a season-ending injury on October 20 against Marshall. Lloyd played in five games, starting two, overall during the 2012 season, recording 22 completions on 44 attempts for 277 yards, one touchdown, and three interceptions. He spent the entire 2013 season as a backup, and did not appear in any games.

Lloyd transferred to play for the Minnesota State Mavericks of Minnesota State University, Mankato in 2014. He played in 14 games, starting 12, during the 2014 season, completing 122 of 195 passes for 1,728 yards, 20 touchdowns and six interceptions while also rushing for 361 yards and four touchdowns. He led the team to the 2014 NCAA Division II Football Championship Game, where they lost to CSU Pueblo by a score of 13–0. Lloyd earned honorable mention NSIC South Division honors for the 2014 season. He split time with Nick Pieruccini in both 2015 and 2016. Lloyd threw for 1,019 yards and nine touchdowns in 2015 and 632 yards and seven touchdowns in 2016. He majored in marketing at Minnesota State.

== Professional career ==
Lloyd went undrafted in the 2017 NFL draft. He signed with the BC Lions of the Canadian Football League (CFL) on April 12, 2018, after impressing the team at a tryout camp in Los Angeles. Lions general manager Ed Hervey said Lloyd "has a strong, accurate arm and possesses plenty of athleticism making him well suited to our game." Lloyd was supposed to play one quarter of the preseason opener against the Calgary Stampeders on June 1, 2018, but ended up playing more than half the game after second-stringer Cody Fajardo suffered an injury. Lloyd completed 15 of 23 passes for 121 yards and three touchdowns with no interceptions as the Lions won 36–23. He was placed on the one-game injured list on June 28, moved to the practice roster on July 12, released on August 8, re-signed to the practice roster on August 13, promoted to the active roster on September 21, and moved back to the practice roster on September 27. Lloyd dressed in two regular season games overall for the Lions during the 2018 season but did not record any statistics. He signed a futures contract with BC on November 13, 2018.

Lloyd was moved to the practice roster on June 9, 2019, before the start of the 2019 CFL season. He was released on June 25. He later signed a future contract with the Lions on November 4, 2019. The 2020 CFL season was cancelled due to the COVID-19 pandemic, and Lloyd was later released on December 11, 2020.
