= 2017 Dixie State Trailblazers football team =

American college football season

2017 Dixie State Trailblazers football
- Conference: Rocky Mountain Athletic Conference
- Record: 5–6 (5–5 RMAC)
- Head coach: Shay McClure (2nd season)
- Offensive coordinator: Reilly Murphy (2nd season)
- Defensive coordinator: Shawn Howe (2nd season)
- Home stadium: Trailblazer Stadium

2017 Rocky Mountain Athletic Conference football standings
	Conf.			Overall
Team	W		L	W		L
Colorado Mesa +	9	–	1	9	–	2
No. 17 CSU Pueblo +^	9	–	1	9	–	3
Colorado Mines	7	–	3	7	–	4
Chadron State	6	–	4	6	–	5
Dixie State	5	–	5	5	–	6
Fort Lewis	5	–	5	5	–	6
South Dakota Mines	4	–	6	5	–	6
Black Hills State	4	–	6	4	–	6
Adams State	4	–	6	4	–	7
New Mexico Highlands	1	–	9	2	–	9
Western State (CO)	1	–	9	1	–	10
+ – Conference co-champions; ^ – NCAA Division II playoff participant; Rankings from AFCA poll

The 2017 Dixie State Trailblazers football team represented Dixie State University (now Utah Tech University) in the 2017 NCAA Division II football season. They were led by second-year head coach Shay McClure and played their home games at Greater Zion Stadium in St. George, Utah as a member of the Rocky Mountain Athletic Conference.

== Schedule ==
Date	Time	Opponent	Site	TV	Result	Attendance
August 31	5:00 p.m.	at New Mexico Highlands	West Las Vegas High School; Las Vegas, MN	ESPN Radio 97.7 FM	L 22–23	875
September 9	6:00 p.m.	at South Dakota Mines	O'Harra Stadium; Rapid City, SD	ESPN Radio 97.7 FM	L 14–35	1,856
September 16	6:00 p.m.	Black Hills State	Trailblazer Stadium; St. George, UT	CEC-TV/ESPN Radio	W 38–16	4,240
September 23	6:00 p.m.	No. 20 Central Washington*	Trailblazer Stadium; St. George, UT	CEC-TV/ESPN Radio	L 40–58	3,151
September 30	1:00 p.m.	at Western Colorado	Mountaineer Bowl; Gunnison, CO	ESPN Radio 97.7 FM	W 15–12	1,832
October 7	1:00 p.m.	Chadron State	Trailblazer Stadium; St. George, UT	CEC-TV/ESPN Radio	W 38–24	2,104
October 14	6:00 p.m.	No. 20 Colorado Mesa	Trailblazer Stadium; St. George, UT	CEC-TV/ESPN Radio	L 22–35	2,522
October 21	12:00 p.m.	at Colorado Mines	Alumni Field; Golden, CO	ESPN Radio 97.7 FM	L 17–19	2,105
October 28	1:00 p.m.	Adams State^{†}	Trailblazer Stadium; St. George, UT	CEC-TV/ESPN Radio	W 54–28	3,468
November 4	1:00 p.m.	No. 24 Colorado State–Pueblo	Trailblazer Stadium; St. George, UT	CEC-TV/ESPN Radio	L 10–31	2,580
November 11	12:00 p.m.	at Fort Lewis	Ray Dennison Memorial Field; Durango, CO	ESPN Radio 97.7 FM	W 23–13	1,350
*Non-conference game; ^{†}Homecoming; Rankings from AFCA Coaches Poll released prior to the game; All times are in Mountain time
