= Bob Bartolomeo =

American football coach (born 1954)

Biographical details
- Born: 1954 (age 71–72)
- Education: Butler University (BS 1977, MS 1979)

Playing career
- 1973–1976: Butler

Coaching career (HC unless noted)
- 1977–1978: Butler (grad assistant)
- 1979: Roncalli HS (assistant)
- 1980–1989: Butler (assistant, DC)
- 1990–1991: Butler
- 1992–2002: Ball State (assistant, DC)
- 2003: Central Michigan (DC)
- 2004–2009: Indianapolis (DC)
- 2010–2018: Indianapolis

Head coaching record
- Overall: 93–33–1
- Tournaments: 2–6 (NCAA D-II playoffs)

Accomplishments and honors

Championships
- 1 MIFC (1991); 6 GLVC (2012–2015, 2017–2018)

Awards
- MIFC Coach of the Year (1991); GLVC Coach of the Year (2012, 2013, 2015, 2017)

Bob Bartolomeo (born 1954) is an American former football player and coach. In 2018, he retired as the head football coach at the University of Indianapolis (UIndy), a position he had held since 2010. He also served as the head football coach at Butler University from 1990 to 1991.

Bartolomeo grew up in northwest Indiana and graduated in 1973 from Andrean High School in Merrillville. He went on to Butler University, where he spent 17 of the next 18 years as a student-athlete, graduate assistant, assistant coach, and ultimately head coach. The Bulldogs won the Indiana Collegiate Conference football championship in each of his four years on the team. A three-time letterwinner at fullback, he graduated with his bachelor’s degree in 1977.

== Coaching career ==
=== Butler ===
Following his graduation, Bartolomeo remained at Butler for two seasons as a graduate assistant, earning a master’s degree in 1979. After he spent the 1979 season as an assistant coach at Roncalli High School in Indianapolis, he returned to Butler as a full-time assistant coach in 1980. He assumed the duties of defensive coordinator and recruiting coordinator in 1984, before becoming head coach in 1990, succeeding former teammate Bill Lynch. The following year, Bartolomeo led the Bulldogs to a Midwest Intercollegiate Football Conference (MIFC) title and a berth in the NCAA Division II football championship playoffs, earning honors as MIFC coach of the year and NCAA Division II Region III coach of the year.

=== Ball State ===
Bartolomeo moved on to Ball State in 1992, where he spent the next eleven seasons, initially as linebackers coach, eventually as assistant head coach and defensive coordinator. For most of this period, he served under former Butler teammate Lynch, who was head coach of the Cardinals from 1995 through 2002. During Bartolomeo’s tenure at Ball State, the Cardinals won two Mid-American Conference (MAC) championships, representing the MAC in the Las Vegas Bowl in 1993 and 1996.

=== Central Michigan ===
Following Lynch’s dismissal as Ball State head coach, Bartolomeo spent the 2003 season as defensive coordinator at Central Michigan.

=== Indianapolis ===
Bartolomeo became defensive coordinator at the University of Indianapolis in 2004, and served in that role for six seasons (through 2009). As head coach of the Greyhounds (2010 through 2018), Bartolomeo made a perennial winner out of a program that had registered just eight winning seasons in the previous two decades, and had never won more than eight games in a season since its founding in 1924. He led UIndy to six Great Lakes Valley Conference (GLVC) championships and to five NCAA Division II football championship playoff berths, in 2012, 2013, 2015, 2017, and 2018. Each of these teams posted at least ten victories, and they remain five of the seven most victorious teams in Greyhound football history. He was named GLVC coach of the year in 2012, 2013, 2015, and 2017.

== Legacy ==
Bartolomeo was inducted into the Butler University Athletics Hall of Fame in 2017, the Indiana Football Hall of Fame in 2019, and the University of Indianapolis Athletics Hall of Fame in 2025.

== Head coaching record ==
Year	Team	Overall	Conference	Standing	Bowl/playoffs	AFCA^{#}
Butler Bulldogs (Midwest Intercollegiate Football Conference) (1990–1991)
1990	Butler	5–5–1	5–4–1	T–4th		
1991	Butler	9–2	9–1	1st	L NCAA Division II First Round	
Butler:		14–7–1	14–5–1			
Indianapolis Greyhounds (Great Lakes Intercollegiate Athletic Conference) (2010–2011)
2010	Indianapolis	6–5	5–5	T–3rd (North)		
2011	Indianapolis	7–4	6–4	T–3rd (North)		
Indianapolis Greyhounds (Great Lakes Valley Conference) (2012–2018)
2012	Indianapolis	10–3	8–0	1st	L NCAA Division II Second Round	15
2013	Indianapolis	10–2	7–0	1st	L NCAA Division II First Round	18
2014	Indianapolis	9–2	7–1	1st		
2015	Indianapolis	10–2	8–0	1st	L NCAA Division II First Round	18
2016	Indianapolis	6–5	5–3	4th		
2017	Indianapolis	11–1	7–0	1st	L NCAA Division II First Round	13
2018	Indianapolis	10–2	7–0	1st	L NCAA Division II Second Round	11
Indianapolis:		79–26	60–13			
Total:		93–33–1				
National championship Conference title Conference division title or championship game berth
