= Harry Simmons (American football) =

American basketball coach

Biographical details
- Born: October 12, 1914
- Died: March 27, 1990 (aged 75)

Playing career

Basketball
- 1934–1938: Colorado

Coaching career (HC unless noted)

Football
- 1939: Vineland HS (CO)
- 1952–1955: Pueblo

Basketball
- 1947–1980: Pueblo / Southern Colorado

Head coaching record
- Overall: 273–172 (college basketball); 347–161 (junior college basketball); 82–15 (high school basketball)

Accomplishments and honors

Championships
- Basketball; 1 NJCAA Division I (1961)

Harry Hugh "Chief" Simmons (October 12, 1914 – March 27, 1990) was an American college football and college basketball coach. He served as the head football coach at Pueblo Junior College—now known as Colorado State University Pueblo—from 1952 to 1955. He also led Pueblo's men's basketball team from 1947 to 1963, and aided their transition from a two-year program, remaining the head coach until 1980. His 1961 team won the NJCAA Division I men's basketball championship.
