= 2012 Indianapolis Greyhounds football team =

American college football season

2012 Indianapolis Greyhounds football

GLVC champion

NCAA Division II Second Round, L 7–28 vs. CSU Pueblo
- Conference: Great Lakes Valley Conference

Ranking
- AFCA: No. 15
- Record: 10–3 (8–0 GLVC)
- Head coach: Bob Bartolomeo (3rd season)
- Offensive coordinator: Todd Carter (3rd season)
- Offensive scheme: Multiple
- Defensive coordinator: Chris Keevers (3rd season)
- Base defense: 4–3
- Home stadium: Key Stadium

2012 Great Lakes Valley Conference football standings
	Conf.			Overall
Team	W		L	W		L
No. 15 Indianapolis $^	8	–	0	10	–	3
No. 24 Missouri S&T	7	–	1	10	–	1
Urbana	5	–	3	7	–	4
Saint Joseph's (IN)	5	–	3	6	–	5
Quincy	4	–	4	4	–	7
McKendree #	3	–	5	3	–	7
William Jewell	2	–	6	3	–	8
Central State	2	–	6	2	–	9
Kentucky Wesleyan	0	–	8	2	–	9
$ – Conference champion; ^ – NCAA Division II playoff participant; # – Provisional Division II member; Rankings from AFCA Poll

The 2012 Indianapolis Greyhounds football team represented the University of Indianapolis (UIndy) during the 2012 NCAA Division II football season as a member of the Great Lakes Valley Conference (GLVC). Led by third-year head coach Bob Bartolomeo, the Greyhounds finished with an overall record of 10–3, going a perfect 8–0 in GLVC play. The team played its home games at Key Stadium in Indianapolis, Indiana. Head coach Bob Bartolomeo was named the GLVC coach of the year.

The 2012 season featured many firsts for the program. The Greyhounds finished the regular season with 9 wins, the most in program history at the time. The Greyhounds also received their first NCAA Division II playoff berth. In the first round, the Greyhounds defeated Midwestern State 31–14, before falling to top-ranked CSU Pueblo, 7–28, in the second round.

== Schedule ==
Date	Time	Opponent	Rank	Site	Result	Attendance
August 30	7:00 p.m.	at Ashland*		Jack Miller Stadium; Ashland, OH	L 14–37	4,064
September 8	4:00 p.m.	at Western Illinois*		Hanson Field; Macomb, IL	L 17–27	13,411
September 15	7:00 p.m.	at Quincy		QU Stadium; Quincy, IL	W 35–7	2,728
September 22	6:00 p.m.	McKendree		Key Stadium; Indianapolis, IN	W 45–15	5,626
September 29	7:30 p.m.	at Missouri S&T		Allgood–Bailey Stadium; Rolla, MO	W 54–35	3,000
October 6	6:00 p.m.	St. Joseph's (IN)^{†}		Key Stadium; Indianapolis, IN	W 56–0	5,839
October 13	6:00 p.m.	Central State		Key Stadium; Indianapolis, IN	W 45–13	3,427
October 20	2:00 p.m.	at Kentucky Wesleyan		Steele Stadium; Owensboro, KY	W 45–14	340
October 27	6:00 p.m.	William Jewell		Key Stadium; Indianapolis, IN	W 48–3	3,033
November 3	6:00 p.m.	Delta State*		Key Stadium; Indianapolis, IN	W 33–18	3,088
November 10	12:00 p.m.	at Urbana	No. 19	UU Stadium; Urbana, OH	W 31–24	3,088
November 17	12:00 p.m.	No. 8 Midwestern State*	No. 18	Key Stadium; Indianapolis, IN (NCAA Division II First Round)	W 31–14	6,235
November 24	2:00 p.m.	at No. 1 CSU Pueblo*	No. 18	DeRose ThunderBowl; Pueblo, CO (NCAA Division II Second Round)	L 7–28	7,517
*Non-conference game; ^{†}Homecoming; Rankings from AFCA Poll released prior to the game; All times are in Eastern time

== Game summaries ==
=== At Ashland ===
Indianapolis Greyhounds at Ashland Eagles – Game summary

Quarter	1	2	3	4	Total
Greyhounds	7	0	7	0	14
Eagles	10	7	6	14	37

at Jack Miller Stadium, Ashland, Ohio

- Date: August 30
- Game time: 7:00 p.m. EDT
- Game weather: Sunny, 73 °F (23 °C)
- Game attendance: 4,064
- Referee: David Siegle
- Box score, Recap

Game information
First quarter
- AU – Greg Galloway 27-yard field goal, 10:52. Eagles 3–0. Drive: 10 plays, 50 yards, 4:08.
- AU – Dan Piko 9-yard pass from Taylor Housewright (Greg Galloway kick), 6:09. Eagles 10–0. Drive: 8 plays, 39 yards, 2:39.
- UINDY – Klay Fiechter 1-yard run (Scott Miller kick), 0:22. Eagles 10–7. Drive: 12 plays, 67 yards, 5:41.

Second quarter

- AU – Steve Nagy 7-yard pass from Taylor Housewright (Greg Galloway kick), 9:53. Eagles 17–7. Drive: 7 plays, 38 yards, 2:16.

Third quarter

- UINDY – Klay Fiechter 2-yard run (Scott Miller kick), 10:34. Eagles 17–14. Drive: 8 plays, 66 yards, 4:20.
- AU – Taylor Housewright 7-yard run (kick failed), 2:45. Eagles 23–14. Drive: 8 plays, 57 yards, 4:00.

Fourth quarter

- AU – Steve Nagy 1-yard run (Greg Galloway kick), 10:16. Eagles 30–14. Drive: 10 plays, 86 yards, 4:49.
- AU – Anthony Taylor 47-yard run (Greg Galloway kick), 3:03. Eagles 37–14. Drive: 6 plays, 78 yards, 3:14.

Statistics	UINDY	AU
First downs	19	18
Total yards	319	423
Rushing yards	135	207
Passing yards	184	216
Turnovers	3	0
Time of possession	27:13	32:47

Team	Category	Player	Statistics
Indianapolis	Passing	Chris Mills	22/38, 184 yards, 2 INT
Indianapolis	Rushing	Klay Fiechter	17 rushes, 103 yards, 2 TD
Indianapolis	Receiving	Greg Johnson	7 receptions, 97 yards
Ashland	Passing	Taylor Housewright	16/25, 216 yards, 2 TD
Ashland	Rushing	Anthony Taylor	14 rushes, 104 yards, TD
Ashland	Receiving	Anthony Capasso	6 receptions, 120 yards

=== At Western Illinois ===
Indianapolis Greyhounds at Western Illinois Leathernecks – Game summary

Quarter	1	2	3	4	Total
Greyhounds	3	7	7	0	17
Leathernecks	14	3	7	3	27

at Hanson Field, Macomb, Illinois

- Date: September 8
- Game time: 4:00 p.m. EDT/3:00 p.m. CDT
- Game weather: Sunny, 71 °F (22 °C)
- Game attendance: 13,411
- Referee: Tim O'Dey
- Box score, Recap

Game information
First quarter
- WIU – Josh Hudson 13-yard run (Pat Smith kick), 10:02. Leathernecks 7–0. Drive: 9 plays, 80 yards, 4:58.
- UINDY – Scott Miller 39-yard field goal, 3:12. Leathernecks 7–3. Drive: 13 plays, 53 yards, 6:45.'
- WIU – Nikko Watson 1-yard run (Pat Smith kick), 0:09. Leathernecks 14–3. Drive: 7 plays, 70 yards, 2:57.

Second quarter

- UINDY – Klay Fiechter 1-yard run (Scott Miller kick), 6:11. Leathernecks 14–10. Drive: 14 plays, 70 yards, 6:36.
- WIU – Pat Smith 46-yard field goal, 0:43. Leathernecks 17–10. Drive: 11 plays, 63 yards, 5:21.

Third quarter

- WIU – Davis Martinez 49-yard interception return (Pat Smith kick), 11:55. Leathernecks 24–10.
- UINDY – Mar'quone Edmonds 52-yard pass from Chris Mills (Scott Miller kick), 5:55. Leathernecks 24–17. Drive: 6 plays, 80 yards, 2:09.

Fourth quarter

- WIU – Pat Smith 34-yard field goal, 1:35. Leathernecks 27–17. Drive: 5 plays, 6 yards, 2:00.

Statistics	UINDY	WIU
First downs	21	18
Total yards	362	321
Rushing yards	145	180
Passing yards	217	141
Turnovers	4	1
Time of possession	28:02	31:58

Team	Category	Player	Statistics
Indianapolis	Passing	Chris Mills	17/28, 217 yards, TD, 4 INT
Indianapolis	Rushing	Klay Fiechter	27 rushes, 122 yards, TD
Indianapolis	Receiving	Mar'quone Edmonds	4 receptions, 96 yards, TD
Western Illinois	Passing	Josh Hudson	14/20, 141 yards, INT
Western Illinois	Rushing	Caulton Ray	19 rushes, 99 yards
Western Illinois	Receiving	Fredson Saloman	6 receptions, 57 yards

=== At Quincy ===
Indianapolis Greyhounds at Quincy Hawks – Game summary

Quarter	1	2	3	4	Total
Greyhounds	14	0	14	7	35
Hawks	0	0	0	7	7

at QU Stadium, Quincy, Illinois

- Date: September 15
- Game time: 7:00 p.m. EDT/6:00 p.m. CDT
- Game weather: Partly cloudy, 73 °F (23 °C)
- Game attendance: 2,728
- Referee: Bob Holshauser
- Box score, Recap

Game information
First quarter
- UINDY – Klay Fiechter 75-yard punt return (Scott Miller kick), 10:20. Greyhounds 7–0.
- UINDY – Klay Fiechter 15-yard run (Scott Miller kick), 0:06. Greyhounds 14–0. Drive: 5 plays, 86 yards, 1:17.

Second quarter

- No scoring plays

Third quarter

- UINDY – Mar'quone Edmonds 53-yard pass from Chris Mills (Scott Miller kick), 5:45. Greyhounds 21–0. Drive: 3 plays, 72 yards, 0:53.
- UINDY – Koby Orris 56-yard fumble return (Scott Miller kick), 2:25. Greyhounds 28–0.

Fourth quarter

- UINDY – Klay Fiechter 19-yard run (Scott Miller kick), 13:47. Greyhounds 35–0. Drive: 4 plays, 52 yards, 1:57.
- QU – LaDarion Shelby 2-yard run (Brandon Mulloy kick), 1:29. Greyhounds 35–7. Drive: 9 plays, 71 yards, 3:27.

Statistics	UINDY	QU
First downs	18	16
Total yards	385	240
Rushing yards	130	116
Passing yards	255	124
Turnovers	0	1
Time of possession	24:13	35:47

Team	Category	Player	Statistics
Indianapolis	Passing	Chris Mills	14/26, 233 yards, TD
Indianapolis	Rushing	Klay Fiechter	17 rushes, 92 yards, 2 TD
Indianapolis	Receiving	Mar'quone Edmonds	6 receptions, 113 yards, TD
Quincy	Passing	James Chmelik	21/32, 124 yards
Quincy	Rushing	Brent Walker	16 rushes, 56 yards
Quincy	Receiving	Jarrod Sergent	5 receptions, 38 yards

=== McKendree ===
McKendree Bearcats at Indianapolis Greyhounds – Game summary

Quarter	1	2	3	4	Total
Bearcats	0	7	0	8	15
Greyhounds	7	7	14	17	45

at Key Stadium, Indianapolis, Indiana

- Date: September 22
- Game time: 6:00 p.m. EDT
- Game weather: Sunny, 57 °F (14 °C)
- Game attendance: 5,626
- Referee: J. Valentine
- Box score, Recap

Game information
First quarter
- UINDY – Klay Fiechter 15-yard run (Scott Miller kick), 0:44. Greyhounds 7–0. Drive: 9 plays, 64 yards, 4:08.

Second quarter

- MCK – Joe Santiago 21-yard pass from David Bergschneider (Matt Kendall kick), 7:34. Tied 7–7. Drive: 14 plays, 79 yards, 8:03.
- UINDY – Mar'quone Edmonds 12-yard pass from Chris Mills (Scott Miller kick), 0:43. Greyhounds 14–7. Drive: 7 plays, 68 yards, 2:11.

Third quarter

- UINDY – Klay Fiechter 1-yard run (Scott Miller kick), 11:25. Greyhounds 21–7. Drive: 9 plays, 71 yards, 3:28.
- UINDY – Mar'quone Edmonds 25-yard pass from Chris Mills (Scott Miller kick), 3:36. Greyhounds 28–7. Drive: 8 plays, 82 yards, 4:03.

Fourth quarter

- UINDY – Scott Miller 22-yard field goal, 12:53. Greyhounds 31–7. Drive: 7 plays, 70 yards, 2:19.
- UINDY – Matt Ripp 47-yard run (Scott Miller kick), 6:26. Greyhounds 38–7. Drive: 3 plays, 56 yards, 1:51.
- MCK – Isaac Fisher 1-yard run (Isaac Fisher pass to Pat Doty), 4:03. Greyhounds 38–15. Drive: 8 plays, 74 yards, 2:21.
- UINDY – Willis Brucker 14-yard run (Scott Miller kick), 0:36. Greyhounds 45–15. Drive: 3 plays, 14 yards, 1:37.

Statistics	MCK	UINDY
First downs	15	19
Total yards	270	457
Rushing yards	163	188
Passing yards	107	269
Turnovers	1	2
Time of possession	32:43	27:17

Team	Category	Player	Statistics
McKendree	Passing	Issac Fisher	6/10, 74 yards
McKendree	Rushing	Jeruel Taylor	14 rushes, 59 yards
McKendree	Receiving	Nick Lutker	5 receptions, 64 yards
Indianapolis	Passing	Chris Mills	19/29, 269 yards, 2 TD, INT
Indianapolis	Rushing	Klay Fiechter	23 rushes, 138 yards, 2 TD
Indianapolis	Receiving	Mar'quone Edmonds	10 receptions, 169 yards, 2 TD

=== At Missouri S&T ===
Indianapolis Greyhounds at Missouri S&T Miners – Game summary

Quarter	1	2	3	4	Total
Greyhounds	7	26	14	7	54
Miners	7	7	7	14	35

at Allgood–Bailey Stadium, Rolla, Missouri

- Date: September 29
- Game time: 7:30 p.m. EDT/6:30 p.m. CDT
- Game weather: Clear, 74 °F (23 °C)
- Game attendance: 3,000
- Referee: David Hubele
- Box score, Recap

Game information
First quarter
- MST – Curt Golden 89-yard pass from Josh Firm (David Druse kick), 13:19. Miners 7–0. Drive: 4 plays, 90 yards, 1:41.
- UINDY – Klay Fiechter 5-yard run (Scott Miller kick), 4:54. Tied 7–7. Drive: 5 plays, 55 yards, 1:58.

Second quarter

- MST – Curt Golden 3-yard run (David Druse kick), 14:18. Miners 14–7. Drive: 13 plays, 73 yards, 5:29.
- UINDY – Klay Fiechter 3-yard run (Scott Miller kick), 6:23. Tied 14–14. Drive: 15 plays, 70 yards, 7:50.
- UINDY – Mar'quone Edmonds 28-yard pass from Chris Mills (Scott Miller kick), 5:39. Greyhounds 21–14. Drive: 1 play, 28 yards, 0:08.
- UINDY – Greg Johnson 11-yard pass from Chris Mills (Scott Miller kick), 0:56. Greyhounds 28–14. Drive: 5 plays, 57 yards, 1:49.
- UINDY – Cole Wassner tackled in own end zone, 0:26. Greyhounds 30–14.
- UINDY – Scott Miller 26-yard field goal, 0:00. Greyhounds 33–14. Drive: 2 plays, 26 yards, 0:19.

Third quarter

- UINDY – Klay Fiechter 34-yard run (Scott Miller kick), 13:03. Greyhounds 40–14. Drive: 4 plays, 44 yards, 1:48.
- UINDY – Klay Fiechter 78-yard run (Scott Miller kick), 9:40. Greyhounds 47–14. Drive: 2 plays, 80 yards, 0:39.
- MST – Ian Kreher 3-yard pass from Josh Firm (David Druse kick), 4:20. Greyhounds 47–21. Drive: 15 plays, 80 yards, 5:14.

Fourth quarter

- MST – Joseph Hyman 8-yard pass from Josh Firm (David Druse kick), 12:51. Greyhounds 47–28. Drive: 11 plays, 80 yards, 3:37.
- UINDY – Matt Ripp 20-yard run (Scott Miller kick), 7:40. Greyhounds 54–28. Drive: 3 plays, 33 yards, 1:24.
- MST – Nick Taylor 13-yard pass from Reed Brown (David Druse kick), 0:28. Greyhounds 54–35. Drive: 14 plays, 70 yards, 7:07.

Statistics	UINDY	MST
First downs	23	28
Total yards	518	461
Rushing yards	248	126
Passing yards	270	335
Turnovers	1	3
Time of possession	25:58	34:02

Team	Category	Player	Statistics
Indianapolis	Passing	Chris Mills	18/22, 270 yards, 2 TD, INT
Indianapolis	Rushing	Klay Fiechter	23 rushes, 190 yards, 4 TD
Indianapolis	Receiving	Greg Johnson	6 receptions, 95 yards, TD
Missouri S&T	Passing	Josh Firm	28/38, 322 yards, 3 TD, 3 INT
Missouri S&T	Rushing	Curt Golden	14 rushes, 48 yards, TD
Missouri S&T	Receiving	Curt Golden	2 receptions, 88 yards, TD

=== St. Joseph's (IN) ===
St. Joseph's Pumas at Indianapolis Greyhounds – Game summary

Quarter	1	2	3	4	Total
Pumas	0	0	0	0	0
Greyhounds	21	28	7	0	56

at Key Stadium, Indianapolis, Indiana

- Date: October 6
- Game time: 6:00 p.m. EDT
- Game weather: Partly cloudy, 52 °F (11 °C)
- Game attendance: 5,839
- Referee: David Hubele
- Box score, Recap

Game information
First quarter
- UINDY – Klay Fiechter 62-yard pass from Chris Mills (Scott Miller kick), 12:54. Greyhounds 7–0. Drive: 1 play, 62 yards, 0:10.
- UINDY – Brenden Williams 29-yard pass from Chris Mills (Scott Miller kick), 9:50. Greyhounds 14–0. Drive: 3 plays, 60 yards, 1:11.
- UINDY – Klay Fiechter 45-yard run (Scott Miller kick), 6:50. Greyhounds 21–0. Drive: 5 plays, 75 yards, 2:04.

Second quarter

- UINDY – Mar'quone Edmonds 6-yard pass from Chris Mills (Scott Miller kick), 13:18. Greyhounds 28–0. Drive: 10 plays, 73 yards, 4:21.
- UINDY – Greg Johnson 34-yard run (Scott Miller kick), 12:58. Greyhounds 35–0. Drive: 1 play, 34 yards, 0:08.
- UINDY – Matt Ripp 52-yard run (Scott Miller kick), 3:10. Greyhounds 42–0. Drive: 3 plays, 67 yards, 1:12.
- UINDY – Mar'quone Edmonds 8-yard pass from Chris Mills (Scott Miller kick), 1:14. Greyhounds 49–0. Drive: 5 plays, 39 yards, 1:43.

Third quarter

- UINDY – Matt Ripp 2-yard run (Scott Miller kick), 8:02. Greyhounds 56–0. Drive: 14 plays, 70 yards, 6:58.

Fourth quarter

- No scoring plays

Statistics	SJC	UINDY
First downs	9	30
Total yards	162	615
Rushing yards	79	383
Passing yards	83	232
Turnovers	3	0
Time of possession	24:04	35:56

Team	Category	Player	Statistics
St. Joseph's	Passing	Tate Borlik	9/14, 66 yards
St. Joseph's	Rushing	Horace Lane	12 rushes, 30 yards
St. Joseph's	Receiving	Julian Walker	7 receptions, 54 yards
Indianapolis	Passing	Chris Mills	17/19, 218 yards, 4 TD
Indianapolis	Rushing	Klay Fiechter	19 rushes, 159 yards, TD
Indianapolis	Receiving	Klay Fiechter	1 reception, 62 yards, TD

=== Central State ===
Central State Marauders at Indianapolis Greyhounds – Game summary

Quarter	1	2	3	4	Total
Marauders	0	0	0	13	13
Greyhounds	7	14	10	14	45

at Key Stadium, Indianapolis, Indiana

- Date: October 13
- Game time: 6:00 p.m. EDT
- Game weather: Mostly cloudy, 67 °F (19 °C)
- Game attendance: 3,427
- Referee: Tom Riepenhoff
- Box score, Recap

Statistics	CSU	UINDY
First downs		
Total yards		
Rushing yards		
Passing yards		
Turnovers		
Time of possession		

Team	Category	Player	Statistics
Central State	Passing		
Central State	Rushing		
Central State	Receiving		
Indianapolis	Passing		
Indianapolis	Rushing		
Indianapolis	Receiving		

=== At Kentucky Wesleyan ===
Indianapolis Greyhounds at Kentucky Wesleyan Panthers – Game summary

Quarter	1	2	3	4	Total
Greyhounds	7	17	21	0	45
Panthers	7	7	0	0	14

at Steele Stadium, Owensboro, Kentucky

- Date: October 20
- Game time: 2:00 p.m. EDT/1:00 p.m. CDT
- Game weather: Partly cloudy, 57 °F (14 °C)
- Game attendance: 340
- Referee: Dave Figueria
- Box score, Recap

Statistics	UINDY	KWC
First downs		
Total yards		
Rushing yards		
Passing yards		
Turnovers		
Time of possession		

Team	Category	Player	Statistics
Indianapolis	Passing		
Indianapolis	Rushing		
Indianapolis	Receiving		
Kentucky Wesleyan	Passing		
Kentucky Wesleyan	Rushing		
Kentucky Wesleyan	Receiving		

=== William Jewell ===
William Jewell Cardinals at Indianapolis Greyhounds – Game summary

Quarter	1	2	3	4	Total
Cardinals	0	0	3	0	3
Greyhounds	10	10	21	7	48

at Key Stadium, Indianapolis, Indiana

- Date: October 27
- Game time: 6:00 p.m. EDT
- Game weather: Clear, 52 °F (11 °C)
- Game attendance: 3,033
- Referee: Ken Myers
- Box score, Recap

Statistics	WJC	UINDY
First downs		
Total yards		
Rushing yards		
Passing yards		
Turnovers		
Time of possession		

Team	Category	Player	Statistics
William Jewell	Passing		
William Jewell	Rushing		
William Jewell	Receiving		
Indianapolis	Passing		
Indianapolis	Rushing		
Indianapolis	Receiving		

=== Delta State ===
Delta State Statesmen at Indianapolis Greyhounds – Game summary

Quarter	1	2	3	4	Total
Statesmen	0	0	3	15	18
Greyhounds	6	10	3	14	33

at Key Stadium, Indianapolis, Indiana

- Date: November 3
- Game time: 6:00 p.m. EDT
- Game weather: Cloudy, 42 °F (6 °C)
- Game attendance: 3,232
- Referee: Rick Schifter
- Box score, Recap

Statistics	DSU	UINDY
First downs		
Total yards		
Rushing yards		
Passing yards		
Turnovers		
Time of possession		

Team	Category	Player	Statistics
Delta State	Passing		
Delta State	Rushing		
Delta State	Receiving		
Indianapolis	Passing		
Indianapolis	Rushing		
Indianapolis	Receiving		

=== At Urbana ===
No. 19 Indianapolis Greyhounds at Urbana Blue Knights – Game summary

Quarter	1	2	3	4	Total
No. 19 Greyhounds	3	13	0	15	31
Blue Knights	7	3	7	7	24

at UU Stadium, Urbana, Ohio

- Date: November 10
- Game time: 12:00 p.m. EST
- Game weather: Sunny, 60 °F (16 °C)
- Game attendance: 3,088
- Referee: David Hubele
- Box score, Recap

Game information
First quarter
- UU – Nate Wilburn-Ogletre 8-yard pass from D. J. Mendenhall (Blaine Hafner kick), 9:55. Blue Knights 7–0. Drive: 13 plays, 75 yards, 5:05.
- UINDY – Scott Miller 42-yard field goal, 5:20. Blue Knights 7–3. Drive: 9 plays, 32 yards, 4:29.

Second quarter

- UINDY – Mar'quone Edmonds 9-yard pass from Chris Mills (Scott Miller kick), 9:16. Greyhounds 10–7. Drive: 16 plays, 97 yards, 5:31.
- UU – Blaine Hafner 34-yard field goal, 4:26. Tied 10–10. Drive: 11 plays, 60 yards, 4:43.
- UINDY – Mar'quone Edmonds 10-yard pass from Chris Mills (kick failed), 0:41. Greyhounds 16–10. Drive: 5 plays, 57 yards, 1:31.

Third quarter

- UU – Nate Wilburn-Ogletre 8-yard pass from D. J. Mendenhall (Blaine Hafner kick), 2:18. Blue Knights 17–16. Drive: 8 plays, 44 yards, 2:56.

Fourth quarter

- UU – Jeffvon Gill 10-yard pass from D. J. Mendenhall (Blaine Hafner kick), 9:04. Blue Knights 24–16. Drive: 14 plays, 91 yards, 5:42.
- UINDY – Logan Young 7-yard pass from Chris Mills (Chris Mills pass to Reece Horn), 6:38. Tied 24–24. Drive: 5 plays, 38 yards, 2:17.
- UINDY – Chris Mills 10-yard run (Scott Miller kick), 1:35. Greyhounds 31–24. Drive: 8 plays, 41 yards, 2:48.

Statistics	UINDY	UU
First downs	19	22
Total yards	355	372
Rushing yards	148	156
Passing yards	207	216
Turnovers	1	2
Time of possession	29:51	30:09

Team	Category	Player	Statistics
Indianapolis	Passing	Chris Mills	21/35, 207 yards, 3 TD, INT
Indianapolis	Rushing	Klay Fiechter	20 rushes, 93 yards
Indianapolis	Receiving	Mar'quone Edmonds	9 receptions, 78 yards, 2 TD
Urbana	Passing	D. J. Mendenhall	22/35, 216 yards, 3 TD, INT
Urbana	Rushing	Jeffvon Gill	32 rushes, 148 yards
Urbana	Receiving	Joe Webb	13 receptions, 124 yards

=== No. 8 Midwestern State (NCAA Division II First Round) ===
NCAA Division II First Round
No. 8 Midwestern State Mustangs at No. 18 Indianapolis Greyhounds – Game summary

Quarter	1	2	3	4	Total
No. 8 Mustangs	0	0	14	0	14
No. 18 Greyhounds	0	7	7	17	31

at Key Stadium, Indianapolis, Indiana

- Date: November 17
- Game time: 12:00 p.m. EST
- Game weather: Sunny, 48 °F (9 °C)
- Game attendance: 6,235
- Referee: Dwight Neibling
- Box score, Recap

Game information
First quarter
- No scoring plays

Second quarter

- UINDY – Chris Mills 9-yard run (Scott Miller kick), 7:19. Greyhounds 7–0. Drive: 10 plays, 75 yards, 5:08.

Third quarter

- MSU – Keidrick Jackson 51-yard run (Greg Saladino kick), 13:39. Tied 7–7. Drive: 4 plays, 70 yards, 1:15.
- MSU – Keidrick Jackson 5-yard run (Greg Galadino kick), 9:49. Mustangs 14–7. Drive: 4 plays, 32 yards, 1:34.
- UINDY – Matt Ripp 4-yard run (Scott Miller kick), 5:48. Tied 14–14. Drive: 9 plays, 82 yards, 3:56.

Fourth quarter

- UINDY – Matt Ripp 15-yard run (Scott Miller kick), 10:23. Greyhounds 21–14. Drive: 11 plays, 89 yards, 5:50.
- UINDY – Scott Miller 19-yard field goal, 7:37. Greyhounds 24–14. Drive: 6 plays, 23 yards, 2:33.
- UINDY – Klay Fiechter 7-yard run (Scott Miller kick), 2:59. Greyhounds 31–14. Drive: 3 plays, 12 yards, 1:31.

Statistics	MSU	UINDY
First downs	14	23
Total yards	280	338
Rushing yards	206	191
Passing yards	74	147
Turnovers	2	0
Time of possession	24:12	35:48

Team	Category	Player	Statistics
Midwestern State	Passing	Jake Glover	7/18, 56 yards, INT
Midwestern State	Rushing	Keidrick Jackson	16 rushes, 91 yards, 2 TD
Midwestern State	Receiving	Keivin Swanson	5 receptions, 39 yards
Indianapolis	Passing	Chris Mills	17/29, 147 yards
Indianapolis	Rushing	Matt Ripp	26 rushes, 143 yards, 2 TD
Indianapolis	Receiving	Mar'quone Edmonds	4 receptions, 42 yards

=== At No. 1 CSU Pueblo (NCAA Division II Second Round) ===
2012 NCAA Division II Second Round
No. 18 Indianapolis Greyhounds at No. 1 CSU Pueblo – Game summary

Quarter	1	2	3	4	Total
No. 18 Greyhounds	0	7	0	0	7
No. 1 ThunderWolves	0	7	7	14	28

at DeRose ThunderBowl, Pueblo, Colorado

- Date: November 24
- Game time: 2:00 p.m. EST/12:00 p.m. MST
- Game weather: Calm and breezy, 75 °F (24 °C)
- Game attendance: 7,517
- Referee: Craig Helser
- Box score, Recap

Game information
First quarter
- No scoring plays

Second quarter

- CSUP – Cameron McDondle 4-yard run (Greg O'Donnell kick), 2:46. ThunderWolves 7–0. Drive: 13 plays, 76 yards, 7:16.
- UINDY – Reece Horn 24-yard pass from Chris Mills (Scott Miller kick), 0:13. Tied 7–7. Drive: 12 plays, 82 yards, 2:28.

Third quarter

- CSUP – Cameron McDondle 11-yard run (Greg O'Donnell kick), 0:49. ThunderWolves 14–7. Drive: 1 play, 11 yards, 0:06.

Fourth quarter

- CSUP – Giovanni Rider 17-yard pass from Ross Dausin (Greg O'Donnell kick), 8:57. ThunderWolves 21–7. Drive: 10 plays, 59 yards, 5:50.
- CSUP – Cameron McDondle 6-yard run (Greg O'Donnell kick), 2:09. ThunderWolves 28–7. Drive: 6 plays, 71 yards, 3:34.

Statistics	UINDY	CSUP
First downs	14	27
Total yards	214	402
Rushing yards	50	216
Passing yards	164	186
Turnovers	3	2
Time of possession	20:16	39:44

Team	Category	Player	Statistics
Indianapolis	Passing	Chris Mills	20/35, 164 yards, TD, 2 INT
Indianapolis	Rushing	Matt Ripp	7 rushes, 26 yards
Indianapolis	Receiving	Reece Horn	5 receptions, 50 yards, TD
CSU Pueblo	Passing	Ross Dausin	18/25, 186 yards, TD, INT
CSU Pueblo	Rushing	Cameron McDondle	18 rushes, 110 yards, 3 TD
CSU Pueblo	Receiving	Marcial Williamson	3 receptions, 35 yards
