= Mike Friedman (American football) =

American football coach (1939–2026)

Biographical details
- Born: September 10, 1939; Albert Lea, Minnesota, U.S.
- Died: November 9, 2026 (aged 87); Saint Paul, Minnesota, U.S.
- Education: UW–Eau Claire (1962)

Coaching career (HC unless noted)
- 1974–1983: Southern Colorado

Head coaching record
- Overall: 60–38–2
- Tournaments: 0–1 (NAIA D-I playoffs)

Accomplishments and honors

Championships
- 1 RMAC (1980)

Michael Albert Friedman (September 10, 1939 – November 9, 2026) was an American football coach. He served as the head football coach at University of Southern Colorado—now known as Colorado State University Pueblo (CSU Pueblo)—from 1974 to 1983.

Friedman's career at Pueblo came to an end after he was caught doctoring game film that was supposed to be submitted to an upcoming opponent.

Friedman died on November 9, 2026, at the age of 87.

== Head coaching record ==
Year	Team	Overall	Conference	Standing	Bowl/playoffs
Southern Colorado Indians (Great Plains Athletic Conference) (1974–1975)
1974	Southern Colorado	3–6	1–4	T–4th	
1975	Southern Colorado	4–5	3–2	T–2nd	
Southern Colorado Indians (Rocky Mountain Athletic Conference) (1976–1983)
1976	Southern Colorado	6–4–1	5–2	3rd	
1977	Southern Colorado	3–7	2–7	T–7th	
1978	Southern Colorado	8–2	NA	NA	
1979	Southern Colorado	8–2	6–2	2nd	
1980	Southern Colorado	8–1	7–1	T–1st	
1981	Southern Colorado	4–6	2–6	7th	
1982	Southern Colorado	9–2	7–1	2nd	L NAIA Division I Quarterfinal
1983	Southern Colorado	6–3–1	6–1–1	2nd	
Southern Colorado:		60–38–2	39–26–1		
Total:		60–38–2			
National championship Conference title Conference division title or championship game berth
