= Reilly Murphy =

American football coach (born 1985)

Current position
- Title: Head coach
- Team: OUAZ
- Conference: SAC
- Record: 8–1

Biographical details
- Born: July 29, 1985 (age 41); San Diego, California, U.S.
- Education: Indiana State University (2008)

Playing career
- 2004–2005: Grossmont
- 2006–2007: Indiana State
- Position: Quarterback

Coaching career (HC unless noted)
- 2010–2011: Grossmont (QB/TE)
- 2012: Notre Dame (OH) (QB/TE)
- 2013: Bethel (KS) (OC/QB)
- 2014–2015: Western New Mexico (AHC/OC)
- 2016–2017: Dixie State (OC)
- 2018: Fayetteville State (OC/QB/RB)
- 2019–2021: Lake Erie
- 2022: Gannon (OC/WR)
- 2023: Gannon (OC)
- 2024: St. Thomas (FL) (co-OC/TE)
- 2025–present: OUAZ

Head coaching record
- Overall: 16–18

Reilly Stephen Murphy (born July 29, 1985) is an American college football coach. He is head football coach for Ottawa University Arizona, a position he has held since 2025. He was the head football coach for Lake Erie College from 2019 to 2021. He was the offensive coordinator for Gannon University from 2022 to 2023. He also coached for Indiana State, Grossmont College, Notre Dame (OH), Bethel (KS), Western New Mexico, Dixie State, Fayetteville State, and St. Thomas (FL). He played college football for Grossmont College and Indiana State as a quarterback.

== Head coaching record ==
Year	Team	Overall	Conference	Standing	Bowl/playoffs
Lake Erie Storm (Great Midwest Athletic Conference) (2019–2021)
2019	Lake Erie	3–8	2–5	T–5th	
2020–21	Lake Erie	0–3	0–3	7th	
2021	Lake Erie	5–6	2–5	6th	
Lake Erie:		8–17	4–13		
OUAZ Spirit (Sooner Athletic Conference) (2025–present)
2025	OUAZ	8–1	7–1	T–1st	
2026	OUAZ	0–0	0–0		
OUAZ:		8–1	7–1		
Total:		16–18			
