= 2017 CSU Pueblo ThunderWolves football team =

American college football season

2017 CSU Pueblo ThunderWolves football

RMC co-champion

NCAA Division II First Round, L 13–16 at Minnesota State
- Conference: Rocky Mountain Athletic Conference

Ranking
- AFCA: No. 17
- Record: 9–3 (9–1 RMAC)
- Head coach: John Wristen (10th season)
- Offensive scheme: Pro-style
- Co-defensive coordinators: Mark Criner (1st season); Donnell Leomiti (1st season)
- Base defense: 3–4
- Home stadium: ThunderBowl

2017 Rocky Mountain Athletic Conference football standings
	Conf.			Overall
Team	W		L	W		L
Colorado Mesa +	9	–	1	9	–	2
No. 17 CSU Pueblo +^	9	–	1	9	–	3
Colorado Mines	7	–	3	7	–	4
Chadron State	6	–	4	6	–	5
Dixie State	5	–	5	5	–	6
Fort Lewis	5	–	5	5	–	6
South Dakota Mines	4	–	6	5	–	6
Black Hills State	4	–	6	4	–	6
Adams State	4	–	6	4	–	7
New Mexico Highlands	1	–	9	2	–	9
Western State (CO)	1	–	9	1	–	10
+ – Conference co-champions; ^ – NCAA Division II playoff participant; Rankings from AFCA poll

The 2017 CSU Pueblo ThunderWolves football team represented Colorado State University–Pueblo as a member of the Rocky Mountain Athletic Conference (RMAC) during 2017 NCAA Division II football season. Led by tenth-year head coach John Wristen, the ThunderWolves compiled an overall record of 9–3 with a mark of 9–1 in conference play, sharing the RMCA title with Colorado Mesa. CSU Pueblo advanced to the NCAA Division II Football Championship playoffs, where they lost to Minnesota State in the first round. The ThunderWolves played their home games at Neta and Eddie DeRose ThunderBowl in Pueblo, Colorado.

== Schedule ==
Date	Time	Opponent	Rank	Site	Result	Attendance
August 31	6:00 p.m.	No. 16 Colorado Mines	No. 12	ThunderBowl; Pueblo, CO	W 38–7	5,595
September 9	5:00 p.m.	at West Texas A&M*	No. 7	Kimbrough Memorial Stadium; Canyon, TX	L 21–24	6,095
September 16	6:00 p.m.	at South Dakota Mines	No. 18	O'Harra Stadium; Rapid City, SD	W 34–14	3,176
September 23	12:00 p.m.	at New Mexico Highlands	No. 19	Sanchez Family Stadium; Las Vegas, NM	W 56–13	379
September 30	2:00 p.m.	Colorado Mesa	No. 17	ThunderBowl; Pueblo, CO	W 30–24	8,129
October 7	6:00 p.m.	Adams State^{†}	No. 14	ThunderBowl; Pueblo, CO	W 63–17	6,356
October 14	12:00 p.m.	at Fort Lewis	No. 12	Ray Dennison Memorial Field; Durango, CO	L 24–35	2,123
October 21	2:00 p.m.	Black Hills State		ThunderBowl; Pueblo, CO	W 49–0	6,023
October 28	2:00 p.m.	Western State (CO)	No. 24	ThunderBowl; Pueblo, CO	W 40–7	5,324
November 4	1:00 p.m.	at Dixie State	No. 24	Trailblazer Stadium; St. George, UT	W 31–10	2,580
November 11	12:00 p.m.	at Chadron State	No. 23	Don Beebe Stadium; Chadron, NE	W 28–6	2,630
November 18	11:00 a.m.	at No. 1 Minnesota State*	No. 20	Blakeslee Stadium; Mankato, MN (NCAA Division II First Round)	L 13–16	1,275
*Non-conference game; ^{†}Homecoming; Rankings from AFCA Poll released prior to the game; All times are in Mountain time

== Rankings ==
Ranking movements Legend: ██ Increase in ranking ██ Decrease in ranking RV = Received votes
	Week												
Poll	Pre	1	2	3	4	5	6	7	8	9	10	11	Final
AFCA poll	12	7	18	19	17	14	12	RV	24	24	23	20	17
