= Joe Prater =

American baseball player and football coach (1922–2004)

Biographical details
- Born: November 19, 1922; St. Paul, Arkansas, U.S.
- Died: August 1, 2004 (aged 81); Pueblo, Colorado, U.S.

Playing career

Baseball
- 1942: Sanford Spinners
- 1942: Olean Oilers
- 1946: Oshkosh Giants
- 1947: Chanute Athletics

Basketball
- 1940: Arkansas

Coaching career (HC unless noted)

Football
- 1948–1950: Lamar Union HS (CO) (assistant)
- 1951–1955: Lamar Union HS (CO)
- 1956–1973: Pueblo / Southern Colorado

Basketball
- 1948–1949: Lamar Union HS (CO) (assistant)
- 1949–1956: Lamar Union HS (CO)
- 1974–1980: Cavalry Baptist Church HS (CO)

Head coaching record
- Overall: 52–53–2 (college football)

Joseph Claude Prater Jr. (November 19, 1922 – August 1, 2004) was an American minor league baseball player and a college football coach. He served as the head football coach at Southern Colorado State College—now known as Colorado State University Pueblo—from 1956 to 1973.

== Head coaching record ==
=== College football ===
Year	Team	Overall	Conference	Standing	Bowl/playoffs
Southern Colorado Indians (Rocky Mountain Athletic Conference) (1963–1968)
1963	Southern Colorado	3–5			
1964	Southern Colorado	6–4			
1965	Southern Colorado	8–1–1			
1966	Southern Colorado	3–7			
1967	Southern Colorado	3–6–1			
1968	Southern Colorado	4–6			
Southern Colorado Indians (Rocky Mountain Athletic Conference) (1969–1971)
1969	Southern Colorado	7–2	3–2	3rd (Plains)	
1970	Southern Colorado	5–5	1–4	T–5th (Plains)	
1971	Southern Colorado	4–6	1–4	6th (Plains)	
Southern Colorado Indians (Great Plains Athletic Conference) (1972–1973)
1972	Southern Colorado	6–4	3–3	T–4th	
1973	Southern Colorado	3–7	1–4	6th	
Southern Colorado:		52–53–2	9–17		
Total:		52–53–2			

=== Junior college football ===
Year	Team	Overall	Conference	Standing	Bowl/playoffs
Pueblo Indians (Empire Junior College Conference) (1956–1962)
1956	Pueblo		5–1	T–2nd	
1957	Pueblo		1–4–1	64th	
1958	Pueblo		2–5	7th	
1959	Pueblo		3–3–1	5th	
1960	Pueblo		4–3	T–3rd	
1961	Pueblo		4–3	T–3rd	
1962	Pueblo		3–4	5th	
Pueblo:			22–23–2		
Total:					
