= 2012 CSU Pueblo ThunderWolves football team =

American college football season

2012 CSU Pueblo ThunderWolves football

RMAC champion

NCAA Division II Quarterfinal, L 13–34 vs. West Texas A&M
- Conference: Rocky Mountain Athletic Conference

Ranking
- AFCA: No. 6
- Record: 12–1 (9–0 RMAC)
- Head coach: John Wristen (5th season)
- Offensive scheme: Pro spread
- Defensive coordinator: Hunter Hughes (5th season)
- Base defense: 3–4
- Home stadium: Neta and Eddie DeRose ThunderBowl

2012 Rocky Mountain Athletic Conference football standings
	Conf.			Overall
Team	W		L	W		L
No. 6 CSU Pueblo $^	9	–	0	12	–	1
No. 18 Chadron State ^	8	–	1	9	–	3
New Mexico Highlands	7	–	2	8	–	3
Adams State	6	–	3	8	–	3
Colorado Mines	4	–	5	6	–	5
Colorado Mesa	4	–	5	4	–	7
Black Hills State #	3	–	6	4	–	7
Western New Mexico	3	–	6	4	–	7
Western State (CO)	1	–	8	1	–	10
Fort Lewis	0	–	9	0	–	10
$ – Conference champion; ^ – NCAA Division II playoff participant; # – Provisional NCAA Division II member; Rankings from AFCA poll

The 2012 CSU–Pueblo ThunderWolves football team represented Colorado State University–Pueblo as a member of the Rocky Mountain Athletic Conference (RMAC) in the 2012 NCAA Division II football season. They were led by fourth-year head coach John Wristen and play their home games at Neta and Eddie DeRose ThunderBowl. They were a member of the .

== Schedule ==
Date	Time	Opponent	Rank	Site	Result	Attendance
August 30	6:00 pm	No. 24 West Texas A&M*	No. 6	Neta and Eddie DeRose ThunderBowl; Pueblo, CO	W 44–34	6,457
September 8	6:00 pm	at Northwestern Oklahoma State*	No. 6	Ranger Field; Alva, OK	W 41–24	2,310
September 15	12:00 pm	at Western New Mexico	No. 3	Ben Altamirano Field; Silver City, NM	W 35–27	976
September 22	6:00 pm	Adams State	No. 3	Neta and Eddie DeRose ThunderBowl; Pueblo, CO	W 30–0	8,677
September 29	1:00 pm	at Fort Lewis	No. 3	Ray Dennison Field; Durango, CO	W 50–21	1,115
October 6	2:00 pm	Chadron State^{†}	No. 2	Neta and Eddie DeRose ThunderBowl; Pueblo, CO	W 45–38 ^{OT}	5,717
October 13	12:00 pm	at Colorado Mines	No. 2	Campbell Field; Golden, CO	W 35–21	2,629
October 20	6:00 pm	Black Hills State	No. 1	Neta and Eddie DeRose ThunderBowl; Pueblo, CO	W 45–13	7,341
October 27	6:00 pm	at Colorado Mesa	No. 1	Ralph Stocker Stadium; Grand Junction, CO	W 48–10	958
November 3	2:00 pm	New Mexico Highlands	No. 1	Neta and Eddie DeRose ThunderBowl; Pueblo, CO	W 31–17	9,217
November 10	1:00 pm	at Western State	No. 1	Mountaineer Bowl; Gunnison, CO	W 21–3	397
November 24	12:00 pm	No. 18 Indianapolis*	No. 1	Neta and Eddie DeRose ThunderBowl; Pueblo, CO (D-II Playoffs Second Round)	W 28–7	7,517
December 1	12:00 pm	No. 16 West Texas A&M*	No. 1	Neta and Eddie DeRose ThunderBowl; Pueblo, CO (D-II Playoffs Quarterfinal)	L 13–34	10,217
*Non-conference game; ^{†}Homecoming; Rankings from AFCA Poll released prior to the game; All times are in Mountain time

== Rankings ==
Ranking movements Legend: ██ Increase in ranking ██ Decrease in ranking ( ) = First-place votes
	Week												
Poll	Pre	1	2	3	4	5	6	7	8	9	10	11	Final
AFCA poll	6	6	3	3	3	2	2	1 (23)	1 (24)	1 (24)	1 (23)	1 (24)	6
