= Gary Richardson (American football) =

American football player and coach (1935–2002)

Biographical details
- Born: July 24, 1935; Los Angeles County, California, U.S.
- Died: December 19, 2002 (aged 67); Denver, Colorado, U.S.

Playing career
- 1959: Colorado College
- Position: Guards

Coaching career (HC unless noted)
- 1962–1965: Widefield HS (CO) (assistant)
- 1966–1967: Montrose HS (CO)
- 1968–1969: Littleton HS (CO)
- 1970: Western State (CO) (DL)
- 1971: Cañon City HS (CO)
- 1972–1974: Southern Colorado (assistant)
- 1975–1980: Montrose HS (CO)
- 1981: Western State (CO) (DL)
- 1982–1983: Chadron State
- 1984: Southern Colorado
- 2000–2002: Stonehill (assistant)

Head coaching record
- Overall: 12–16 (college)

Gary James Richardson (July 24, 1935 – December 19, 2002) was an American football coach and. He served as the head football coach at Chadron State College in Chadron, Nebraska, from 1982 to 1983 and University of Southern Colorado—now known as Colorado State University Pueblo (CSU Pueblo)—for one season in 1984 before the program was closed due to budget cuts.

Richardson played football at Los Angeles Valley College and Colorado College. He coached at the Colorado School of Mines and was an assistant coach at Stonehill College from 2000 to 2002.

Richardson died from brain cancer, at his home in Denver, on December 19, 2002, at age 67.

== Head coaching record ==
=== College ===
| Year | Team | Overall | Conference | Standing | Bowl/playoffs |
|---|---|---|---|---|---|
Chadron State Eagles (NAIA Division II independent) (1982–1983)
| 1982 | Chadron State | 6–2 | | | |
| 1983 | Chadron State | 4–6 | | | |
| Chadron State: | | 10–8 | | | |
Southern Colorado Indians (Rocky Mountain Athletic Conference) (1984)
| 1984 | Southern Colorado | 2–8 | 2–6 | T–6th | |
| CSU–Pueblo: | | 2–8 | 2–6 | | |
| Total: | | 12–16 | | | |
