= Phil Vigil =

American football coach (born c. 1985)

Philip Vigil
Current position
- Title: Head coach
- Team: CSU Pueblo
- Conference: RMAC
- Record: 28–7

Biographical details
- Born: c. 1985 (age 40–41); Denver, Colorado, U.S.
- Education: Mesa State University (2008); Northwest Missouri State University (2011)

Playing career
- 2005–2008: Mesa State
- Position: Quarterback

Coaching career (HC unless noted)
- 2009: Colorado Mines (DB)
- 2010–2011: Northwest Missouri State (RB)
- 2012–2014: Colorado Mesa (Co-OC/QB)
- 2015–2018: Fort Hays State (Pass Game Coordinator/QB)
- 2019–2020: Stephen F. Austin (Recruiting Coordinator/RB)
- 2021–2022: Western New Mexico
- 2023–present: CSU Pueblo

Head coaching record
- Overall: 35–22

Accomplishments and honors

Championships
- 2 RMAC (2024, 2025)

Philip Vigil (born c. 1985) is an American college football coach. He is the head football coach for Colorado State University Pueblo, a position he has held since 2023. Before this role, he was the head football coach at Western New Mexico University from 2021 to 2022. Additionally, Vigil coached for Colorado Mines, Northwest Missouri State, Colorado Mesa, Fort Hays State, and Stephen F. Austin. He played college football for Mesa State as a quarterback.

== Head coaching record ==
Year	Team	Overall	Conference	Standing	Bowl/playoffs	AFCA^{#}	D2^{°}
Western New Mexico Mustangs (Lone Star Conference) (2021–2022)
2021	Western New Mexico	1–10	0–7	8th			
2022	Western New Mexico	6–5	6–4	T–3rd			
Western New Mexico:		7–15	6–11				
CSU Pueblo ThunderWolves (Rocky Mountain Athletic Conference) (2023–present)
2023	CSU Pueblo	8–3	7–2	3rd			
2024	CSU Pueblo	10–2	9–0	1st	L NCAA Division II Second Round	8	11
2025	CSU Pueblo	10–2	9–0	1st	L NCAA Division II First Round	11	14
2026	CSU Pueblo	0–0	0–0				
CSU Pueblo:		28–7	25–2				
Total:		35–22					
