= John Wristen =

American football player and coach (born 1962)

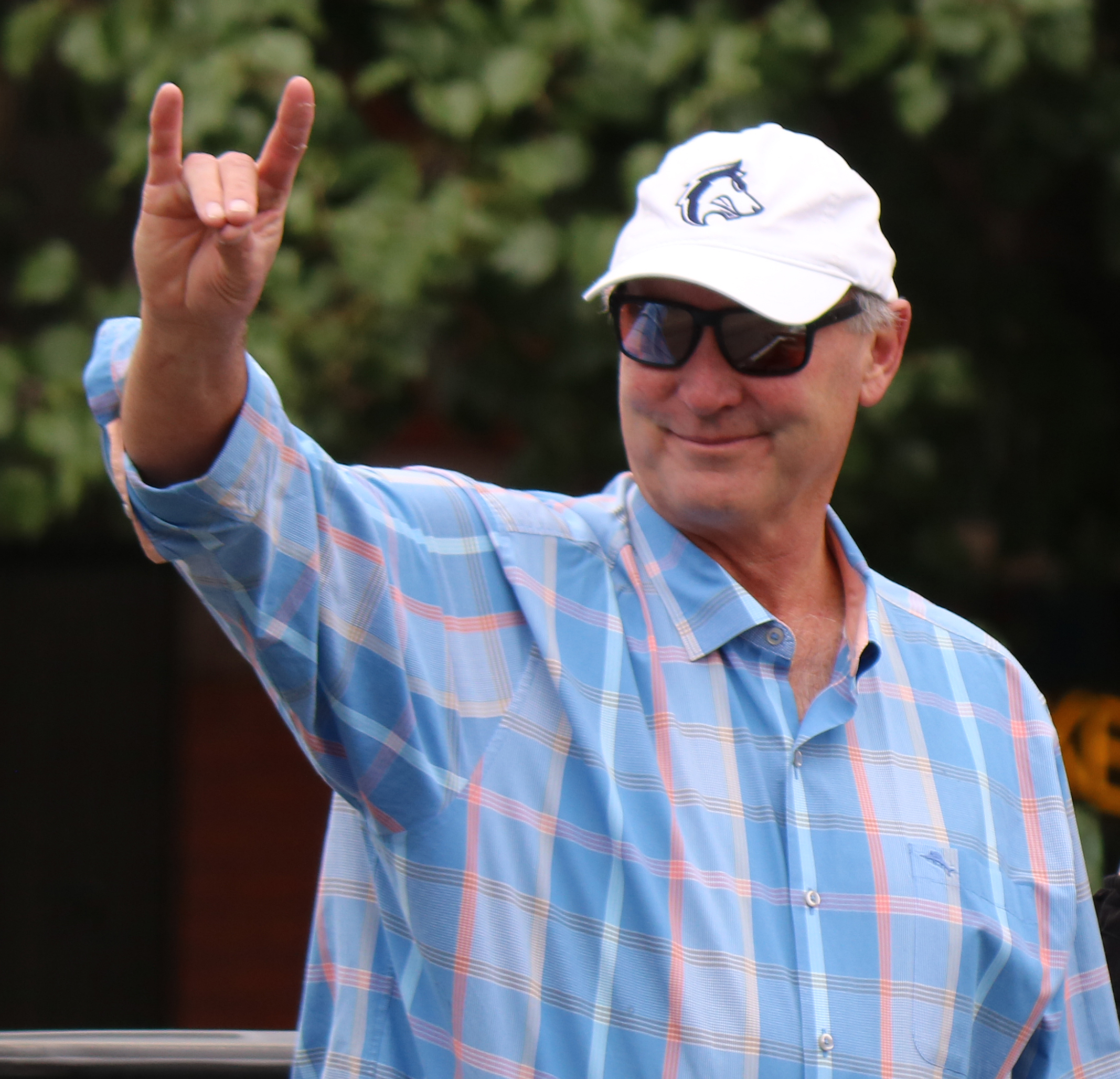
- Wristen in 2023

Biographical details
- Born: April 15, 1962 (age 64); Denver, Colorado, U.S.

Playing career
- 1980–1983: Southern Colorado
- Position: Quarterback

Coaching career (HC unless noted)
- 1991–1998: Northwestern (RB/ST)
- 1999–2000: Colorado (RB/ST)
- 2001–2005: Colorado (TE/ST)
- 2006–2007: UCLA (TE/ST)
- 2008–2022: CSU Pueblo

Head coaching record
- Overall: 133–37
- Tournaments: 9–8 (NCAA D-II playoffs)

Accomplishments and honors

Championships
- 1 NCAA Division II (2014); 8 RMAC (2011–2018)

John Wristen (born April 15, 1962) is an American former college football coach and player. He was the head football coach at Colorado State University–Pueblo (CSU Pueblo), a position he held from 2008 until his retirement in 2022. He graduated from CSU Pueblo in 1984, when the school was known as the University of Southern Colorado. Wristen led the 2014 CSU Pueblo ThunderWolves football team to the NCAA Division II Football Championship title.

== Head coaching record ==
Year	Team	Overall	Conference	Standing	Bowl/playoffs	AFCA^{#}
CSU Pueblo ThunderWolves (Rocky Mountain Athletic Conference) (2008–2022)
2008	CSU Pueblo	4–6	3–6	T–6th		
2009	CSU Pueblo	7–4	6–3	T–3rd		
2010	CSU Pueblo	9–2	7–2	T–3rd		
2011	CSU Pueblo	11–1	9–0	1st	L NCAA Division II Second Round	9
2012	CSU Pueblo	12–1	9–0	1st	L NCAA Division II Quarterfinal	6
2013	CSU Pueblo	11–1	9–0	1st	L NCAA Division II Second Round	7
2014	CSU Pueblo	14–1	8–1	T–1st	W NCAA Division II Championship	1
2015	CSU Pueblo	12–2	9–0	1st	L NCAA Division II Quarterfinal	5
2016	CSU Pueblo	8–3	8–2	T–1st		
2017	CSU Pueblo	9–3	9–1	T–1st	L NCAA Division II First Round	17
2018	CSU Pueblo	11–2	9–1	T–1st	L NCAA Division II Second Round	7
2019	CSU Pueblo	11–2	9–1	2nd	L NCAA Division II Second Round	12
2020–21	No team—COVID-19					
2021	CSU Pueblo	6–5	6–3	4th		
2022	CSU Pueblo	8–4	7–2	T–2nd	L NCAA Division II First Round	
CSU Pueblo:		133–37	102–19			
Total:		133–37				
National championship Conference title Conference division title or championship game berth
^{#}Rankings from AFCA Poll.
