= CSU Pueblo ThunderWolves football =

College football team for Colorado State University Pueblo

- First season: 1938; 88 years ago (Note: CSU Pueblo did not sponsor football from 1985 through the 2007, it was reinstated in 2008; 18 years ago.)
- Athletic director: Paul Plinske
- Head coach: Phil Vigil; 2nd season, 18–4 (.818)
- Location: Pueblo, Colorado
- Stadium: ThunderBowl (capacity: 6,500)
- NCAA division: Division II
- Conference: RMAC
- Colors: Red and blue

NCAA Division II championships
- 2014

Conference championships
- 10
- Website: www.gothunderwolves.com

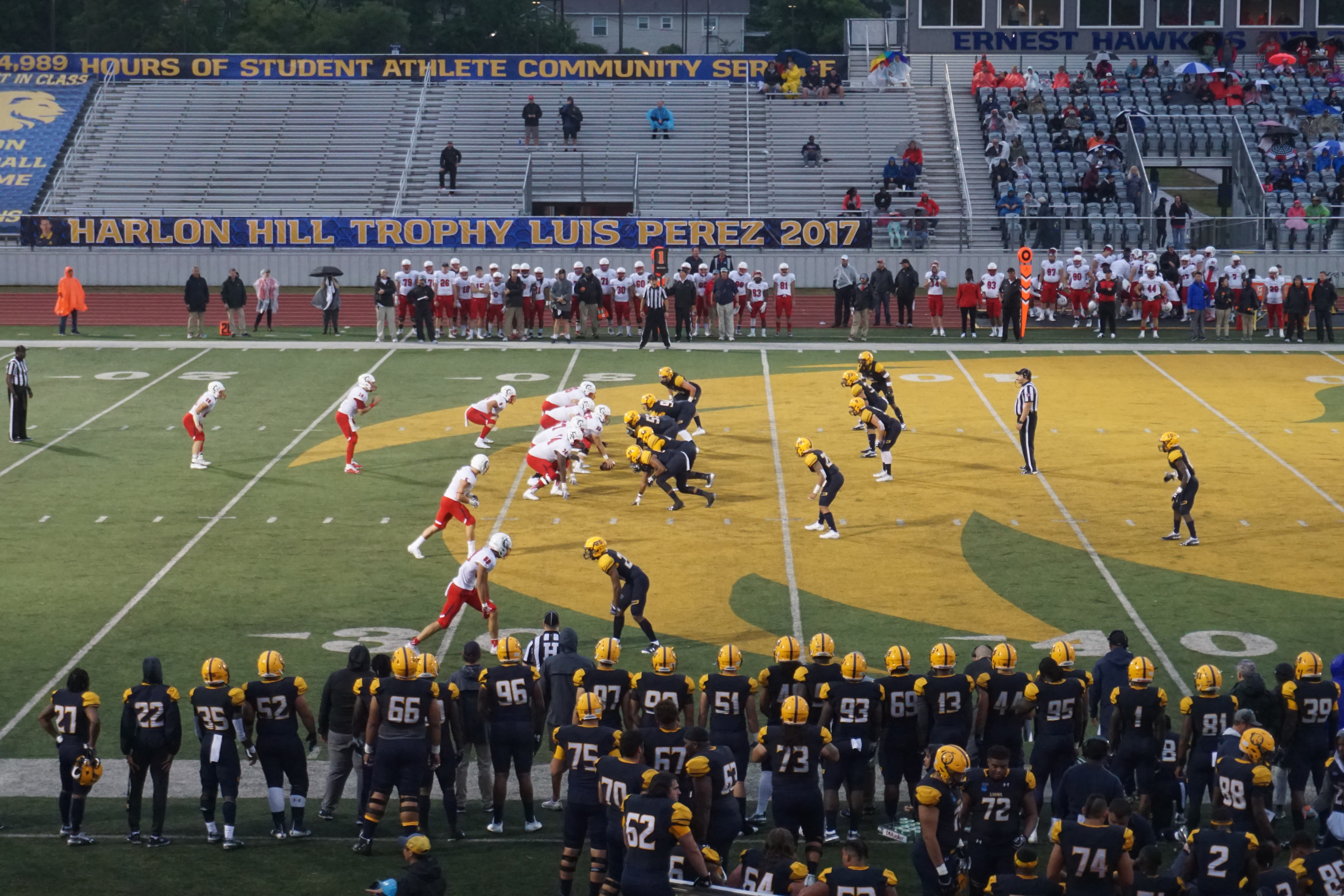
CSU Pueblo in action against the Texas A&M–Commerce Lions in 2018

The CSU Pueblo ThunderWolves football program represent Colorado State University Pueblo in college football at the NCAA Division II level. They have fielded a football team every year since 1938 with the exceptions of 1943 to 1945 and 1985 to 2007.

== Championships ==
=== National championships ===
CSU Pueblo has won one NCAA Division II Football Championship.

Year	Association	Division	Head coach	Record	Opponent	Result
2014	NCAA (1)	Division II (1)	John Wristen	14–1 (8–1 RMAC)	Minnesota State	W, 13–0

=== Conference championships ===
CSU Pueblo has won eight conference titles.

Year	Conference	Coach	Overall record	Conference record
1980	RMAC	Mike Friedman	9–1	7–1
2011	RMAC	John Wristen	11–1	9–0
2012	RMAC	John Wristen	12–1	9–0
2013	RMAC	John Wristen	11–1	9–0
2014	RMAC	John Wristen	14–1	8–1
2016	RMAC	John Wristen	8–3	8–2
2017	RMAC	John Wristen	9–3	9–1
2018	RMAC	John Wristen	11–2	9–1
2024	RMAC	Philip Vigil	10–2	9–0
2025	RMAC	Philip Vigil	10–2	9–0
10 conference championships

- CSU Pueblo vacated their RMAC Championship from the 2015 season due to an administrative oversight which resulted in the use of an ineligible player.

== Postseason appearances ==
=== NAIA Division I playoffs ===
The ThunderWolves, then known as the Indians, made one appearance in the NAIA Division I playoffs, with a combined record of 0–1.

Year	Round	Opponent	Result
1982	Quarterfinals	Central State (OK)	L, 20–61

=== NCAA Division II playoffs ===
The ThunderWolves have made eleven appearances in the NCAA Division II playoffs, with a combined record of 7–9.

Year	Round	Opponent	Result
2011	Second Round	Minnesota–Duluth	L, 21–24
2012	Second Round; Quarterfinals	Indianapolis; West Texas A&M	W, 28–7; L, 13–34
2013	Second Round	Grand Valley State	L, 30–34
2014	Second Round; Quarterfinals; Semifinals; National Championship	Angelo State; Ohio Dominican; West Georgia; Minnesota State	W, 52–14; W, 31–28; W, 10–7; W, 13–0
2017	First Round	Minnesota State	L, 13–16 ^{OT}
2018	First Round; Second Round	Colorado Mines; Minnesota State	W, 37–17; L, 10–24
2019	First Round; Second Round	Augustana (SD); Minnesota State	W, 17–0; L, 7–35
2022	First Round	Colorado Mines	L, 24–45
2024	Second Round	Minnesota State	L, 23–26
2025	First Round	UT Permian Basin	L, 24–37
2026	First Round	Midwestern State	TBP

== Head coaches ==
- Dale Rea (1938–1940)
- Jack Johnson (1941)
- Dan Lawrence (1942)
- No team (1943–1945, 1985–2007)
- Maurice Elder (1948–1951)
- Harry Simmons (1952–1955)
- Joe Prater (1956–1973)
- Mike Friedman (1974–1983)
- Gary Richardson (1984)
- John Wristen (2008–2022)
- Phil Vigil (2023– )
