= Fort Lewis Skyhawks =

Athletic teams representing Fort Lewis College

- University: Fort Lewis College
- Nickname: Skyhawks
- NCAA: Division II
- Conference: Rocky Mountain Athletic Conference
- Athletic director: Shawn Jakubowski
- Location: Durango, Colorado
- Varsity teams: 11
- Football stadium: Ray Dennison Memorial Field
- Basketball arena: Whalen Gymnasium
- Baseball stadium: Brandt Field
- Soccer stadium: Dirks Field
- Colors: Dark blue, light blue, and gold
- Website: www.goskyhawks.com

The Fort Lewis Skyhawks are the athletic teams that represent Fort Lewis College, located in Durango, Colorado, in NCAA Division II intercollegiate sports. The Skyhawks compete as members of the Rocky Mountain Athletic Conference for all 11 varsity sports. The college's teams were previously known as the Beavers, Aggies, and Raiders.

== Athletic facilities ==
Facilities include the 4,000 seat Ray Dennison Memorial Field for football and lacrosse, the 2,750-seat Whalen Gymnasium for men's and women's basketball and women's volleyball, Aspen Field for softball, and Dirks Field, with a seating capacity of 2,000 for men's and women's soccer.

== Varsity sports ==
=== Teams ===
Men's sports

- Basketball
- Cross country
- Football
- Golf
- Soccer
- Outdoor track

Women's sports

- Golf
- Basketball
- Cross country
- Lacrosse
- Soccer
- Softball
- Track & field
- Volleyball
- Outdoor track
- Cheer

=== Basketball ===
The Skyhawks women's basketball team earned a berth in the NCAA Division II national title game in 2010.

=== Football ===
The Fort Lewis College football team won the RMAC championship in 1984 and defeated Dixie State to win the 2006 Dixie Rotary Bowl. Quarterback Andrew Webb (2000–2003) holds the single game RMAC passing record with 636 yards vs. Mesa State on November 16, 2002, and has the 3rd-highest RMAC career passing yards with 11,742.

=== Golf ===
The men's golf team reached the NCAA Division II Championships in the 2010–2011 season.

=== Soccer ===
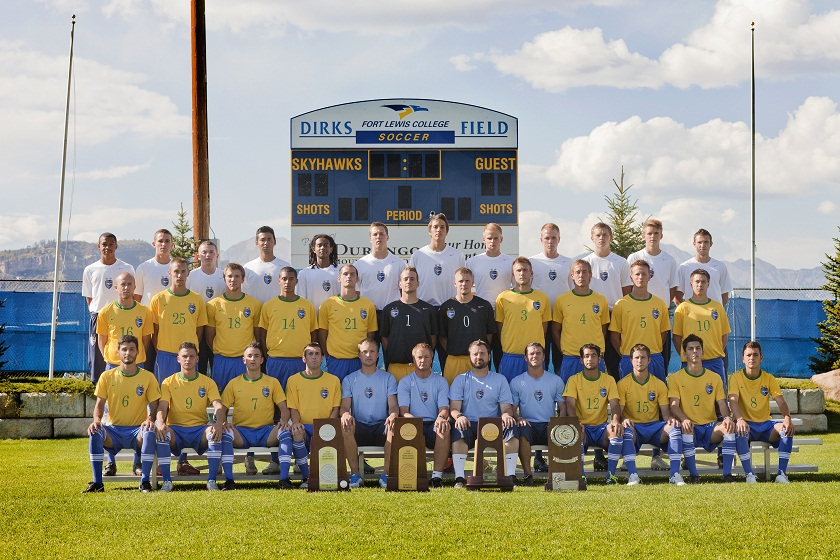
The 2011 NCAA Division II national champion Skyhawk men's soccer team.

The Fort Lewis College men's soccer team won the 2011 NCAA Division II Men’s Soccer National Championships. The win was the team's third NCAA Division II national championship, having won in 2005, 2009, and 2011. The Skyhawks men's soccer team also reached the finals and were national runners-up in 1999 and 2006.

== RMAC championships ==
Men's basketball: regular season (7) 1986–87, 1988–89, 2004–05, 2007–08, 2015–16, 2017–18, 2022–23; tournament (5) 2002, 2008, 2011, 2016, 2023

Football: (1) 1984

Men's golf: regular season (2) 2010, 2011; tournament (2) 1985, 2005

Men's soccer: regular season (7) 2004, 2005, 2006, 2008, 2009, 2011, 2023; Tournament (11) 1997, 1998, 1999, 2000, 2001, 2005, 2006, 2007, 2008, 2009, 2011

Women's basketball: regular season (6) 1982–83, 1985–86, 1988–89, 2007–08, 2008–09, 2009–10; tournament (2) 2011, 2012

Women's cross country: all-time individual champion (1) Melissa Knight 1988

Women's soccer: regular season (1) 2010; tournament (4) 1999, 2006, 2007, 2009

Softball: tournament (2) 2008, 2012

Volleyball: regular season (4) 1988, 1989, 1994, 2007

== National championships ==
=== Team ===
Sport	Association	Division	Year	Opponent/Runner-up	Score
Men's Soccer	NCAA	Division II	2005	Franklin Pierce	3–1
Men's Soccer	NCAA	Division II	2009	Lees–McRae	1–0
Men's Soccer	NCAA	Division II	2011	Lynn	3–2

== Club, intramural, and non-NCAA sports ==
Club sports teams are organized, coached, and administered by student team members and play intercollegiate schedules. Club sports include baseball, cycling, women's golf, men's lacrosse, men's and women's rugby, ski & snowboard, men's and women's soccer, tennis, track & field, and ultimate frisbee. Intramural sports offered include basketball, flag football, softball, soccer, volleyball, kickball, dodgeball, ultimate frisbee, badminton, and tennis.

=== Cycling ===
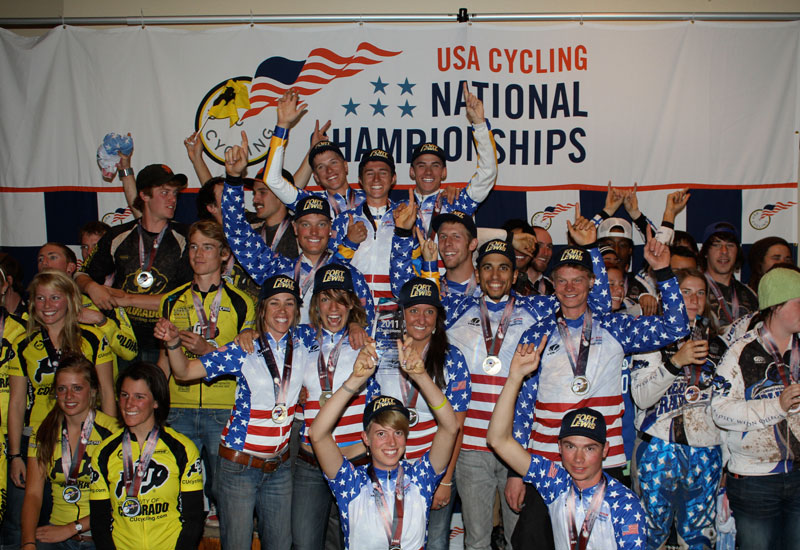
FLC Cycling won USA Cycling's team 2011omnium national championship title in mountain biking at Angel Fire, NM

The Fort Lewis College Cycling team, a club sport, races in the USA Collegiate Cycling Division I as a member of the Rocky Mountain Collegiate Cycling Conference, and was ranked first in the nation after the 2009–2010, 2010–2011, and 2011–2012 seasons. The team competes in track, mountain biking, cyclocross, road, and BMX disciplines, and has won 23 team national championships in those disciplines since 1995.
