= List of Pittsburg State Gorillas football seasons =

This is a list of Pittsburg State Gorillas football season records. The Pittsburg State Gorillas football team is the football team of Pittsburg State University, located in the American city of Pittsburg, Kansas. The team competes as a Mid-America Intercollegiate Athletics Association (MIAA) at the NCAA Division II level.

In the program's beginning, the team was known as the Normals, but that changed in the early 1920s when the student body voted to be nicknamed the Gorillas. Since 1924, Pittsburg State's football team has played in Carnie Smith Stadium, named after the seventh head coach at Pittsburg State. Prior to renaming the stadium after Smith in 1986, the stadium was named after the school's first president, William Aaron Brandenburg. However, the field is named Brandenburg Field.

Pittsburg State has won 31 conference championships: two in the Kansas Intercollegiate Athletic Conference, nine in the Central Intercollegiate Athletic Conference, one in the Rocky Mountain Athletic Conference, seven in the Central States Intercollegiate Conference, and 12 in the Missouri/Mid-America Intercollegiate Athletics Association. Pittsburg State is the winningest program in NCAA DII history.

== Seasons ==
As of June 2026, the records are up-to-date.

Year	Coach	Overall	Conference	Standing	Bowl/playoffs	AFCA^{#}	D2^{°}
Albert McLeland (No conference) (1908)
1908	Albert McLeland	2–2–2					
John Fuhrer (Kansas Intercollegiate Athletic Conference) (1909–1914)
1909	John Fuhrer	2–2–1					
1910	John Fuhrer	7–3–0					
1911	John Fuhrer	6–3–0	0–2–0				
1912	John Fuhrer	4–4–0	1–2–0				
1913	John Fuhrer	4–2–1	0–1–1				
1914	John Fuhrer	1–7–0	0–3–0				
Ray Courtright (Kansas Intercollegiate Athletic Conference) (1915–1917)
1915	Ray Courtright	4–5–0	2–2–0				
1916	Ray Courtright	7–3–0	3–1–0				
1917	Ray Courtright	4–3–2	3–2–1				
John W. Fuhrer (Kansas Intercollegiate Athletic Conference) (1918)
1918	John W. Fuhrer	3–1–0					
Garfield Weede (Kansas Intercollegiate Athletic Conference) (1919–1928)
1919	Garfield Weede	7–2–1	5–0–1				
1920	Garfield Weede	5–4–1	3–3–0				
1921	Garfield Weede	7–2–1	5–1–1				
1922	Garfield Weede	4–5–0	3–4–0				
1923	Garfield Weede	3–3–1	2–2–1				
1924	Garfield Weede	7–0–1	5–0–1				
1925	Garfield Weede	5–2–1	5–2–0				
1926	Garfield Weede	2–6–0	1–5–0				
1927	Garfield Weede	6–2–0	5–2–0				
Central Intercollegiate Athletic Conference
1928	Garfield Weede	0–7–0		0–6–0			
Blue Howell (Central Intercollegiate Athletic Conference) (1929–1935)
1929	Blue Howell	1–5–2	1–3–2				
1930	Blue Howell	6–3–0	3–3–0				
1931	Blue Howell	4–5–0	3–3–0				
1932	Blue Howell	6–1–2	4–1–1				
1933	Blue Howell	4–3–2	2–2–2				
1934	Blue Howell	6–3–0	3–2–0				
1935	Blue Howell	6–3–0	3–1–0				
Charles Morgan (Central Intercollegiate Athletic Conference) (1936)
1936	Charles Morgan	3–5–0	3–1–0				
Blue Howell (Central Intercollegiate Athletic Conference) (1937)
1937	Blue Howell	2–7–0	1–3–0				
Charles Morgan (Central Intercollegiate Athletic Conference) (1938–1948)
1938	Charles Morgan	4–4–2	2–2–2				
1939	Charles Morgan	3–4–2	2–1–2				
1940	Charles Morgan	3–7–0	1–4–0				
1941	Charles Morgan	5–2–3	3–1–0				
1942	Charles Morgan	7–1–0	5–0–0				
1943	Charles Morgan	6–0–0					
1944	Charles Morgan	3–3–0					
1945	Charles Morgan	2–2–2					
1946	Charles Morgan	4–2–3	1–2–2				
1947	Charles Morgan	2–7–1	1–3–1				
1948	Charles Morgan	2–6–2	1–4–0				
Carnie Smith (Central Intercollegiate Athletic Conference) (1949–1965)
1949	Carnie Smith	8–2–1	5–1–0				
1950	Carnie Smith	5–5–0			L 21–32 Mizra Shrine Bowl		
1951	Carnie Smith	7–3–0	4–1–0				
1952	Carnie Smith	5–4–1	2–2–1				
1953	Carnie Smith	6–3–1	2–2–1				
1954	Carnie Smith	6–2–0	3–2–0				
1955	Carnie Smith	7–3–0	5–0–0				
1956	Carnie Smith	7–2–1	3–1–1				
1957	Carnie Smith	11–0–0	5–0–0		W 27–26 Holiday Bowl (NAIA)		
1958	Carnie Smith	4–5–1	3–2–0				
1959	Carnie Smith	6–3–0	4–1–0				
1960	Carnie Smith	8–1–0	4–1–0				
1961	Carnie Smith	11–0–0	5–0–0		W 12–7 Camellia Bowl		
1962	Carnie Smith	6–3–0	3–2–0				
1963	Carnie Smith	5–3–1	2–2–1				
1964	Carnie Smith	4–5–0	2–2–0				
1965	Carnie Smith	3–6–0	2–2–0				
1966	Carnie Smith	7–2–0	3–1–0				
Rocky Mountain Athletic Conference
Tom Lester (Rocky Mountain Athletic Conference) (1967–1975)
1967	Tom Lester	6–2–1	3–1–0				
1968	Tom Lester	4–5–1	2–1–1				
1969	Tom Lester	5–5–0	2–3–0				
1970	Tom Lester	9–2–0	4–1–0				
1971	Tom Lester	8–1–1	3–1–1				
Great Plains Athletic Conference
1972	Tom Lester	5–5–0	3–3–0				
1973	Tom Lester	3–7–0	2–3–0				
1974	Tom Lester	4–7–0	4–1–0				
1975	Tom Lester	4–4–2	3–2–0				
Central States Intercollegiate Conference
Ron Randleman (Central States Intercollegiate Conference) (1976–1981)
1976	Ron Randleman	3–5–1	1–4–0				
1977	Ron Randleman	1–8–1	1–5–1				
1978	Ron Randleman	7–3–0	6–1–0				
1979	Ron Randleman	8–3–0	6–1–0				
1980	Ron Randleman	7–4–0	5–2–0				
1981	Ron Randleman	10–2–0	7–0–0				
Bruce Polen (Central States Intercollegiate Conference) (1982–1983)
1982	Bruce Polen	7–2–0	6–1–0				
1983	Bruce Polen	6–4–0	4–3–0				
Mike Mayerske (Central States Intercollegiate Conference) (1984)
1984	Mike Mayerske	5–4–0	4–3–0				
Dennis Franchione (Central States Intercollegiate Conference) (1985–1989)
1985	Dennis Franchione	8–2–0	6–1–0				
1986	Dennis Franchione	11–1–0	7–0–0				
1987	Dennis Franchione	11–1–0	7–0–0				
1988	Dennis Franchione	11–1–0	7–0–0				
Missouri/Mid-America Intercollegiate Athletics Association
1989	Dennis Franchione	12–1–0	10–0–0	1st			
Chuck Broyles (Missouri / Mid-America Intercollegiate Athletics Association) (1990–2009)
1990	Chuck Broyles	12–1–0	9–0–0	1st	L NCAA Division II Semifinal		
1991	Chuck Broyles	13–1–1	8–0–1	1st	W NCAA Division II Championship		
1992	Chuck Broyles	14–1–0	9–0–0	1st	L NCAA Division II Championship		
1993	Chuck Broyles	8–3–0	8–1–0	2nd	L NCAA Division II First Round		
1994	Chuck Broyles	10–1–0	9–0–0	1st	L NCAA Division II First Round		
1995	Chuck Broyles	12–1–1	9–0–0	1st	L NCAA Division II Championship		
1996	Chuck Broyles	8–3	8–1	T–1st	L NCAA Division II First Round		
1997	Chuck Broyles	9–2	8–1	2nd	L NCAA Division II First Round		
1998	Chuck Broyles	7–3	6–3	T–3rd			
1999	Chuck Broyles	10–2	8–1	2nd	L NCAA Division II First Round	7	
2000	Chuck Broyles	9–3	7–2	3rd	L NCAA Division II First Round	4	
2001	Chuck Broyles	11–2	8–1	1st	L NCAA Division II Quarterfinal	6	
2002	Chuck Broyles	8–3	6–3	T–3rd			
2003	Chuck Broyles	9–3	7–2	T–1st	L NCAA Division II First Round	13	
2004	Chuck Broyles	14–1	9–0	1st	L NCAA Division II Championship	2	
2005	Chuck Broyles	10–4	6–2	T–2nd	L NCAA Division II Quarterfinal	12	
2006	Chuck Broyles	10–2	7–2	T–2nd	W Mineral Water	15	
2007	Chuck Broyles	8–3	6–3	T–3rd			
2008	Chuck Broyles	11–2	8–1	2nd	L NCAA Division II Second Round	8	
2009	Chuck Broyles	5–6	3–6	T–7th			
Tim Beck (Mid-America Intercollegiate Athletics Association) (2010–2019)
2010	Tim Beck	6–6	3–6	T–6th	W Mineral Water		
2011	Tim Beck	13–1	8–1	1st	W NCAA Division II Championship	1	
2012	Tim Beck	7–3	7–3	T–4th			
2013	Tim Beck	10–2	7–2	3rd	W Mineral Water Bowl	19	
2014	Tim Beck	11–2	10–2	T–1st	L NCAA Division II Second Round	7	
2015	Tim Beck	6–5	6–5	T–5th			
2016	Tim Beck	7–4	7–4	T–4th			
2017	Tim Beck	8–4	7–4	T–4th	W Agent Barry Live United Bowl		
2018	Tim Beck	8–3	8–3	3rd			
2019	Tim Beck	6–5	6–5	T–5th			
Brian Wright (Mid-America Intercollegiate Athletics Association) (2020–2023)
2020	Brian Wright	2–2					
2021	Brian Wright	8–3	8–3	3rd			
2022	Brian Wright	12–1	11–0	1st	L NCAA Division II Second Round	5	
2023	Brian Wright	11–2	9–1	T–1st	L NCAA Division II Second Round	5	5
Tom Anthony (Mid-America Intercollegiate Athletics Association) (2024–present)
2024	Tom Anthony	8–3	7–2	2nd	L NCAA Division II First Round	17	14
2025	Tom Anthony	10–3	8–1	T–1st	L NCAA Division II Second Round	6	6
Total:		768–370–47					
National championship Conference title Conference division title or championship game berth
^{#}Rankings from final AFCA poll.; ^{°}Rankings from final D2Football.com poll.
