= 1956 Pittsburg State Gorillas football team =

American college football season

1956 Pittsburg State Gorillas football
- Conference: Central Intercollegiate Conference
- Record: 7–2–1 (3–1–1 CIC)
- Head coach: Carnie Smith (8th season)
- Home stadium: Brandenburg Stadium

1956 Central Intercollegiate Conference football standings
	Conf.					Overall
Team	W		L		T	W		L		T
St. Benedict's $	4	–	1	–	0	7	–	3	–	0
Pittsburg State	3	–	1	–	1	7	–	2	–	1
Southwestern (KS)	3	–	1	–	1	4	–	4	–	2
Washburn	3	–	2	–	0	3	–	6	–	0
Emporia State	1	–	4	–	0	2	–	6	–	1
Fort Hays State	0	–	5	–	1	1	–	8	–	0
$ – Conference champion

The 1956 Pittsburg State Gorillas football team represented Kansas State Teachers College of Pittsburg—now known as Pittsburg State University—as a member of the Central Intercollegiate Conference (CIC) during the 1956 college football season. Led by eighth-year head coach Carnie Smith, the Gorillas compiled an overall record of 7–2–1 with a mark of 3–1–1 in conference play, tying for second place in the CIC. Pittsburg State played home games at Brandenburg Stadium in Pittsburg, Kansas.

== Schedule ==
Date	Opponent	Site	Result	Source
September 15	Missouri–Rolla*	Brandenburg Stadium; Pittsburg, KS	W 13–0	
September 22	Southwest Missouri State*	Brandenburg Stadium; Pittsburg, KS	W 19–7	
September 29	at Northeast Missouri State*	Kirksville, MO	W 46–18	
October 6	at St. Benedict's	Atchison, KS	L 6–26	
October 13	at Fort Hays State	Hays, KS	W 27–6	
October 20	Washburn	Brandenburg Stadium; Pittsburg, KS	W 27–0	
October 27	Emporia State	Brandenburg Stadium; Pittsburg, KS	W 35–0	
November 2	Southwestern (KS)	Brandenburg Stadium; Winfield, KS	T 7–7	
November 10	Northeastern State*	Brandenburg Stadium; Pittsburg, KS	L 6–31	
November 18	at Central Missouri State*	Warrensburg, MO	W 28–6	
*Non-conference game
