= Wayne State Warriors football, 2010–2019 =

American college football season

2010–2019 Wayne State Warriors football
- Conference: Great Lakes Intercollegiate Athletic Conference
- Head coach: Paul Winters (2004–2022)
- Home stadium: Tom Adams Field

The Wayne State Warriors football program, 2010–2019 represented Wayne State University during the 2010s in NCAA Division II college football as a member of the Great Lakes Intercollegiate Athletic Conference (GLIAC). The team was led by head coach Paul Winters who held the post from 2004 to 2022. Highlights of the decade included:

- The 2010 team compiled a 9–2 record, won the inaugural GLIAC South Division championship, and set school single-season records for most wins (nine) and points scored (347), and finished with the highest ranking (No. 12) in program history in the Division II coaches poll.
- The 2011 team advanced to the Division II playoffs where it won four consecutive underdog road victories before losing in the national championship game to No. 1 Pittsburg State.

The team played its home games at Tom Adams Field in Detroit. The field was named after Thomas B. Adams, a Wayne State football and track athlete who became a decorated naval aviator in World War II.

== 2010 ==
2010 Wayne State Warriors football

GLIAC South Division champion
- Conference: Great Lakes Intercollegiate Athletic Conference
- South Division

Ranking
- AFCA: No. 21
- Record: 9–2 (8–2 GLIAC)
- Head coach: Paul Winters (7th season)
- Defensive coordinator: John Hauser (2nd season)
- Home stadium: Tom Adams Field

2010 Great Lakes Intercollegiate Athletic Conference football standings
	Conf.			Overall
Team	W		L	W		L
North
No. 10 Grand Valley State $^	9	–	1	11	–	2
No. 25 Michigan Tech	8	–	2	8	–	2
Indianapolis	5	–	5	6	–	5
Ferris State	5	–	5	5	–	6
Northern Michigan	5	–	5	5	–	6
Northwood	5	–	5	5	–	6
Saginaw Valley State	4	–	6	4	–	7
South
No. 21 Wayne State (MI)	8	–	2	9	–	2
No. 16 Hillsdale ^	8	–	2	9	–	3
Ashland	7	–	3	8	–	3
Lake Erie	3	–	7	3	–	8
Ohio Dominican *	2	–	8	2	–	8
Findlay	1	–	9	1	–	10
Tiffin	0	–	10	1	–	10
$ – Conference champion; ^ – NCAA Division II playoff participant; * – Provisional NCAA Division II member; Rankings from AFCA poll

The 2010 Wayne State Warriors football team represented Wayne State University as a member of the Great Lakes Intercollegiate Athletic Conference (GLIAC) during the 2010 NCAA Division II football season. In their seventh season under head coach Paul Winters, the Warriors compiled a 9–2 record (8–2 in conference games), won the inaugural GLIAC South Division championship, and outscored opponents by a total 347 to 228. It was Wayne State's third consecutive winning season – a feat not accomplished by the program since 1976, 1977, and 1978. The team also set school single-season records for most wins (nine), conference wins (eight), and points scored (347) and finished the season ranked No. 12 in the Division II coaches poll, the program's highest finish ever in that poll.

Key players on the 2010 team included:

- Quarterback Mickey Mohner completed 158 of 263 passes (60.1%) for 2,015 yards, 14 touchdowns, 10 interceptions and a 134.4 efficiency rating. Mohner was inducted into the Wayne State Athletic Hall of Fame in 2023.
- Runnng back Josh Renel gained 1,249 rushing yards on 224 attempts for an average of 5.6 yards per carry. He also led the team in scoring with 90 points on 15 touchdowns. He also ranked second in the country in all-purpose yards per game (213.3). Renel was inducted into the Wayne State Athletic Hall of Fame in 2018.
- Wide receiver Troy Burrell led the team with 57 receptions for 900 yards. Burrell was inducted into the Wayne State Athletic Hall of Fame in 2019.
- Linebacker Raleigh Ross led the defense with 69 total tackles.
- Defensive end Daunte Akra led the team with 12.5 tackles for loss and 8.5 sacks.

=== Schedule ===
Date	Time	Opponent	Rank	Site	Result	Attendance	Source
September 4	12:00 p.m.	Northwood*		Tom Adams Field; Detroit, MI	W 31–19	3,956	
September 11	1:30 p.m.	at Tiffin		Frost-Kalnow Stadium; Tiffin, OH	W 63–14	375	
September 18	1:00 p.m.	at Michigan Tech		Sherman Field; Houghton, MI	L 7–24	2,417	
September 25	12:00 p.m.	Ohio Dominican		Tom Adams Field; Detroit, MI	W 17–7	2,236	
October 2	12:00 p.m.	Northern Michigan^{†}		Tom Adams Field; Detroit, MI	W 26–18	2,786	
October 9	7:00 p.m.	at Lake Erie		Jack Britt Memorial Stadium; Painesville, OH	W 28–16	2,429	
October 16	12:00 p.m.	Ashland		Tom Adams Field; Detroit, MI	L 35–40	2,540	
October 23	12:00 p.m.	No. 6 Hillsdale		Tom Adams Field; Detroit, MI	W 14–9	2,720	
October 30	12:00 p.m.	at Saginaw Valley State		Harvey Randall Wickes Memorial Stadium; University Center, MI	W 41–27	3,127	
November 6	12:00 p.m.	Indianapolis	No. 24	Tom Adams Field; Detroit, MI	W 41–27	2,395	
November 13	12:00 p.m.	at Findlay	No. 17	Donnell Stadium; Findlay, OH	W 44–27	1,011	
*Non-conference game; ^{†}Homecoming; Rankings from AFCA Poll released prior to the game; All times are in Eastern time

== 2011 ==
2011 Wayne State Warriors football

NCAA Division II championship game, L 21–35 vs. Pittsburg State
- Conference: Great Lakes Intercollegiate Athletic Conference
- South Division

Ranking
- AFCA: No. 2
- Record: 12–4 (7–3 GLIAC)
- Head coach: Paul Winters (8th season)
- Defensive coordinator: John Hauser (3rd season)
- Home stadium: Tom Adams Field

2011 Great Lakes Intercollegiate Athletic Conference football standings
	Conf.			Overall
Team	W		L	W		L
North
Grand Valley State	7	–	3	8	–	3
Saginaw Valley State ^	7	–	3	7	–	4
Indianapolis	6	–	4	7	–	4
Michigan Tech	6	–	4	7	–	4
Ferris State	5	–	5	6	–	5
Northern Michigan	3	–	7	4	–	7
Northwood	1	–	9	2	–	9
South
Hillsdale $	8	–	2	8	–	3
No. 2 Wayne State (MI) ^	7	–	3	12	–	4
Ohio Dominican	6	–	4	7	–	4
Ashland	6	–	4	6	–	5
Findlay	6	–	4	6	–	5
Lake Erie	2	–	8	3	–	8
Tiffin	0	–	10	0	–	11
$ – Conference champion; ^ – NCAA Division II playoff participant; Rankings from AFCA poll

The 2011 Wayne State Warriors football team represented Wayne State University as a member of the Great Lakes Intercollegiate Athletic Conference during the 2011 NCAA Division II football season. In their eighth year under head coach Paul Winters, the Warriors compiled a 12–4 record (7–3 in conference games), finished second in the GLIAC's South Division, and outscored opponents by a total of 550 to 382. The unranked Warriors advanced to the Division II playoffs where they won four consecutive underdog road victories before losing in the national championship game to No. 1 Pittsburg State. The team was only the second unranked team to reach the national championship game.

Key players on the team included:

- Quarterback Mickey Mohner completed 186 of 334 passes (55.7%) for 2,799 yards, 25 touchdowns, 11 interceptions, and a 144.2 efficiency rating. Mohner was inducted into the Wayne State Athletic Hall of Fame in 2023.
- Running backs Toney Davis and Josh Renel tallied 1,557 and 1,353 rushing yards, respectively. Davis led the team in scoring with 132 points on 22 touchdowns. Renel was inducted into the Wayne State Athletic Hall of Fame in 2018.
- Wide receiver Troy Burrell had 87 receptions for 1,633 yards and 15 touchdowns. Burrell was inducted into the Wayne State Athletic Hall of Fame in 2019.
- Kicker Stefan Terleckyj scored 106 points on 70 extra point kicks and 12 field goals.
- Free safety Jeremy Jones led the team with 106 total tackles. He also had nine interceptions. Jones was inducted into the Wayne State Athletic Hall of Fame in 2024.
- Linebacker Ed Viverette led the team with 15.5 tackles for loss. Viverette was inducted into the Wayne State Athletic Hall of Fame in 2020.
- Linebacker Nores Fradi led the team with 8.5 sacks.
- Offensive tackle Joe Long, the younger brother of Michigan All-American Jake Long, started 48 consecutive games for the Warriors.

=== Schedule ===
Date	Time	Opponent	Rank	Site	TV	Result	Attendance	Source
September 3	12:00 p.m.	Urbana*	No. 21	Tom Adams Field; Detroit, MI		W 69–24	2,425	
September 10	12:00 p.m.	Tiffin	No. 17	Tom Adams Field; Detroit, MI		W 55–0	1,787	
September 17	12:00 p.m.	No. 22 Michigan Tech^{†}	No. 14	Tom Adams Field; Detroit, MI		W 27–10	3,809	
September 24	7:00 p.m.	at Ohio Dominican	No. 9	Panther Field; Columbus, OH		W 31–24	1,857	
October 1	4:00 p.m.	at Northern Michigan	No. 9	Superior Dome; Marquette, MI		W 30–28	4,333	
October 8	12:00 p.m.	Lake Erie	No. 6	Tom Adams Field; Detroit, MI		W 45–24	2,829	
October 15	2:00 p.m.	at Ashland	No. 6	Jack Miller Stadium; Ashland, OH		L 17–20	4,528	
October 22	1:30 p.m.	at Hillsdale	No. 17	Muddy Waters Stadium; Hillsdale, MI		W 27–24 ^{2OT}	2,076	
October 29	12:00 p.m.	Saginaw Valley State	No. 15	Tom Adams Field; Detroit, MI		L 20–28	3,099	
November 5	6:00 p.m.	at Indianapolis	No. 24	Key Stadium; Indianapolis, IN		W 28–19	4,463	
November 12	12:00 p.m.	Findlay	No. 22	Tom Adams Field; Detroit, MI		L 42–43 ^{OT}	2,919	
November 19	12:00 p.m.	at No. 14 St. Cloud State*		Husky Stadium; St. Cloud, MN (NCAA Division II first round)		W 48–38	837	
November 26	12:00 p.m.	at No. 4 Nebraska–Kearney*		Ron & Carol Cope Stadium; Kearney, NE (NCAA Division II second round)		W 38–26	2,219	
December 3	12:00 p.m.	at No. 6 Minnesota–Duluth*		James S. Malosky Stadium; Duluth, MN (NCAA Division II quarterfinal)		W 31–25	3,659	
December 10	2:00 p.m.	at No. 3 Winston-Salem State*		Bowman Gray Stadium; Winston-Salem, NC (NCAA Division II semifinal)		W 21–14	8,721	
December 17	11:00 a.m.	vs. No. 1 Pittsburg State*		Braly Municipal Stadium; Florence, AL (NCAA Division II championship game)	ESPN2	L 21–35	7,276	
*Non-conference game; ^{†}Homecoming; Rankings from AFCA Poll released prior to the game; All times are in Eastern time

== 2012 ==
2012 Wayne State Warriors football
- Conference: Great Lakes Intercollegiate Athletic Conference
- South Division
- Record: 5–5 (5–5 GLIAC)
- Head coach: Paul Winters (9th season)
- Defensive coordinator: John Hauser (4th season)
- Home stadium: Tom Adams Field

2012 Great Lakes Intercollegiate Athletic Conference football standings
	Conf.			Overall
Team	W		L	W		L
North
Grand Valley State	7	–	3	8	–	3
Saginaw Valley State	7	–	3	8	–	3
Michigan Tech	7	–	3	7	–	3
Hillsdale	7	–	3	7	–	4
Ferris State	6	–	4	7	–	4
Wayne State (MI)	5	–	5	5	–	5
Northwood	4	–	6	5	–	6
Northern Michigan	4	–	6	5	–	6
South
No. 9 Ashland $^	10	–	0	11	–	1
Ohio Dominican	7	–	3	8	–	3
Findlay	7	–	3	7	–	3
Lake Erie	3	–	7	3	–	8
Notre Dame (OH)	2	–	8	3	–	8
Tiffin	2	–	8	3	–	8
Walsh *	2	–	8	3	–	8
Malone *	1	–	9	1	–	9
$ – Conference champion; ^ – NCAA Division II playoff participant; * – Provisional NCAA Division II member; Rankings from AFCA poll

The 2012 Wayne State Warriors football team represented Wayne State University as a member of the Great Lakes Intercollegiate Athletic Conference (GLIAC) during the 2012 NCAA Division II football season. In their ninth year under head coach Paul Winters, the Warriors compiled a 5–5 record (5–5 in conference games), finished sixth in the GLIAC's North Division, and were outscored by a total of 244 to 213.

Key players included:

- Quarterback Mickey Mohner completed 120 of 226 passes (53.1%) for 1,350 yards, seven touchdowns, six interceptions, and a 108.19 efficiency rating. Mohner was inducted into the Wayne State Athletic Hall of Fame in 2023.
- Running back Toney Davis led the team with 949 rushing yards on 195 carries for an average of 4.9 yards per carry. He also led the team in scoring with 84 points on 14 touchdowns.
- Wide receiver Dominique Maybanks had 36 receptions for 411 yards.
- Linebacker Ed Viverette led the team with 100 total tackles. Viverette was inducted into the Wayne State Athletic Hall of Fame in 2020.

=== Schedule ===
Date	Time	Opponent	Rank	Site	Result	Attendance	Source
September 8	7:00 pm	at Ashland	No. 5	Miller Stadium; Ashland, OH	L 0–7	4,620	
September 15	12:00 pm	Lake Erie	No. 19	Tom Adams Field; Detroit, MI	W 35–31	3,149	
September 22	7:00 pm	at Malone	No. 21	Fawcett Stadium; Canton, OH	W 38–14	1,500	
September 29	12:00 pm	at Northwood	No. 18	Hantz Stadium; Midland, MI	W 21–11	2,219	
October 6	12:00 pm	Hillsdale	No. 19	Tom Adams Field; Detroit, MI	W 24–21	3,219	
October 11	8:00 pm	at No. 17 Saginaw Valley State	No. 18	Harvey Randall Wickes Memorial Stadium; University Center, MI	L 7–24	6,631	
October 20	12:00 pm	Northern Michigan^{†}		Tom Adams Field; Detroit, MI	W 38–31	3,119	
October 27	12:00 pm	Ferris State		Tom Adams Field; Detroit, MI	L 24–35	2,452	
November 3	7:00 pm	at No. 19 Grand Valley State		Lubbers Stadium; Allendale, MI	L 13–35	8,977	
November 10	12:00 pm	Michigan Tech		Tom Adams Field; Detroit, MI	L 13–35	2,395	
^{†}Homecoming; Rankings from AFCA Poll released prior to the game; All times are in Eastern time

== 2013 ==
2013 Wayne State Warriors football
- Conference: Great Lakes Intercollegiate Athletic Conference
- South Division
- Record: 3–8 (3–7 GLIAC)
- Head coach: Paul Winters (10th season)
- Home stadium: Tom Adams Field

2013 Great Lakes Intercollegiate Athletic Conference football standings
	Conf.			Overall
Team	W		L	W		L
North
No. 22 Saginaw Valley State ^	9	–	1	9	–	3
Ferris State	8	–	2	8	–	3
No. 3 Grand Valley State ^	7	–	2	12	–	3
Michigan Tech	6	–	4	6	–	4
Hillsdale	5	–	4	5	–	6
Northern Michigan	3	–	7	3	–	7
Wayne State (MI)	3	–	7	3	–	8
Northwood	1	–	8	2	–	9
South
No. 12 Ohio Dominican $^	9	–	0	10	–	1
Findlay	6	–	3	8	–	3
Ashland	5	–	4	5	–	5
Lake Erie	3	–	6	4	–	7
Walsh	3	–	6	3	–	8
Malone	1	–	8	2	–	9
Tiffin	1	–	8	2	–	9
$ – Conference champion; ^ – NCAA Division II playoff participant; Rankings from AFCA poll

The 2013 Wayne State Warriors football team represented Wayne State University as a member of the Great Lakes Intercollegiate Athletic Conference (GLIAC) during the 2013 NCAA Division II football season. In their tenth year under head coach Paul Winters, the Warriors compiled a 3–8 record (3–7 in conference games), tied for sixth place in the GLIAC's North Division, and were outscored by a total of 341 to 245. The team won three of its first five games, then lost the remaining six games.

The team's key players included:

- Quarterback Carl Roscoe completed 56 of 120 passes (46.7%) for 814 yards, six touchdowns, six interceptions, and a 110.15 efficiency rating.
- Running back Toney Davis tallied 743 rushing yards on 180 carries for an average of 4.1 yards per carry. Davis also tied for the lead on the team in scoring with 48 points on eight touchdowns.
- Wide receiver Michael Johnson led the team with 491 receiving yards on 33 receptions.
- Kicker Stefan Terleckyj tied with Davis for the team scoring title with 48 points, as he converted 30 of 31 extra points and six of nine field goals.

=== Schedule ===
Date	Time	Opponent	Site	Result	Attendance	Source
September 5	7:00 p.m.	at No. 17 Carson–Newman*	Burke–Tarr Stadium; Jefferson City, TN	L 28–55	4,103	
September 14	6:00 p.m.	No. 21 Ashland	Tom Adams Field; Detroit, MI	W 34–22	4,109	
September 21	1:00 p.m.	at Lake Erie	Jack Britt Memorial Stadium; Painesville, OH	L 17–35	740	
September 28	12:00 p.m.	Malone	Tom Adams Field; Detroit, MI	W 38–27	2,115	
October 5	12:00 p.m.	Northwood^{†}	Tom Adams Field; Detroit, MI	W 31–17	3,415	
October 12	1:00 p.m.	at Hillsdale	Muddy Waters Stadium; Hillsdale, MI	L 16–35	1,178	
October 19	12:00 p.m.	No. 28 Saginaw Valley State	Tom Adams Field; Detroit, MI	L 10–14	2,325	
October 26	1:00 p.m.	at Northern Michigan	Superior Dome; Marquette, MI	L 21–33	4,103	
November 2	12:00 p.m.	at Ferris State	Top Taggart Field; Big Rapids, MI	L 10–41	1,338	
November 9	12:00 p.m.	Grand Valley State	Tom Adams Field; Detroit, MI	L 20–34	4,429	
November 16	1:00 p.m.	at Michigan Tech	Sherman Field; Houghton, MI	L 21–28	1,319	
*Non-conference game; ^{†}Homecoming; Rankings from AFCA Poll released prior to the game; All times are in Eastern time

== 2014 ==
2014 Wayne State Warriors football
- Conference: Great Lakes Intercollegiate Athletic Conference
- Record: 7–4 (6–4 GLIAC)
- Head coach: Paul Winters (11th season)
- Home stadium: Tom Adams Field

2014 Great Lakes Intercollegiate Athletic Conference football standings
	Conf.			Overall
Team	W		L	W		L
No. 11 Ferris State $^	10	–	0	11	–	1
No. 4 Ohio Dominican ^	9	–	1	11	–	2
No. 21 Michigan Tech ^	9	–	1	9	–	2
Ashland	8	–	2	8	–	2
Wayne State (MI)	6	–	4	7	–	4
Grand Valley State	6	–	4	6	–	5
Findlay	4	–	6	5	–	6
Northwood	4	–	6	5	–	6
Tiffin	4	–	6	5	–	6
Hillsdale	4	–	6	4	–	7
Lake Erie	3	–	7	4	–	7
Walsh	3	–	7	4	–	7
Northern Michigan	2	–	8	3	–	8
Saginaw Valley State	2	–	8	2	–	9
Malone	1	–	9	1	–	10
$ – Conference champion; ^ – NCAA Division II playoff participant; Rankings from AFCA poll

The 2014 Wayne State Warriors football team represented Wayne State University as a member of the Great Lakes Intercollegiate Athletic Conference (GLIAC) during the 2014 NCAA Division II football season. In their 11th year under head coach Paul Winters, the Warriors compiled a 7–4 record (6–4 in conference games), tied for fifth place in the GLIAC, and outscored their opponents by a total of 360 to 235.

The team's key players included:

- Quarterback Carl Roscoe completed 107 of 188 passes (56.9%) for 1,615 yards, 10 touchdowns, nine interceptions, and a 137.1 efficiency rating. He also rushed for 139 yards, giving him 1,754 yards of total offense.
- Running back Desmond Martin gained 1,578 rushing yards on 287 carries for an average of 5.5 yards per carry. He also led the team in scoring with 96 points on 16 touchdowns
- Michael Johnson led the team with 59 receptions for 879 yards and 10 touchdowns.
- Kicker Paul Graham ranked second in scoring with 84 points, converting 42 of 43 extra point kicks and 14 of 15 field goal attempts.
- Free safety Zak Bielecki led the team with 101 total tackles.
- Linebacker Nores Fradi tallied 100 total tackles and led the team with 28.5 tackles for loss, totaling 113 yards. He also led the team with 8.5 sacks.

=== Schedule ===
Date	Time	Opponent	Site	Result	Attendance	Source
September 4	6:00 p.m.	Michigan Tech	Tom Adams Field; Detroit, MI	L 17–18	3,103	
September 13	6:00 p.m.	No. 13 Carson–Newman*	Tom Adams Field; Detroit, MI	W 41–31	2,755	
September 20	7:00 p.m.	at Malone	Fawcett Stadium; Canton, OH	W 39–15	1,200	
September 27	12:00 p.m.	Northwood^{†}	Tom Adams Field; Detroit, MI	W 45–27	3,334	
October 4	12:00 p.m.	Tiffin	Tom Adams Field; Detroit, MI	L 23–26	1,809	
October 11	7:00 p.m.	at Grand Valley State	Lubbers Stadium; Allendale, MI	L 3–17	13,412	
October 18	1:00 p.m.	at Northern Michigan	Superior Dome; Marquette, MI	L 30–33	3,461	
October 25	12:00 p.m.	Walsh	Tom Adams Field; Detroit, MI	W 52–17	1,509	
November 1	12:00 p.m.	at Findlay	Donnell Stadium; Findlay, OH	W 43–10	848	
November 8	1:00 p.m.	at Lake Erie	Jack Britt Memorial Stadium; Painesville, OH	W 47–28	573	
November 15	12:00 p.m.	Hillsdale	Tom Adams Field; Detroit, MI	W 20–13	1,619	
*Non-conference game; ^{†}Homecoming; Rankings from AFCA Poll released prior to the game; All times are in Eastern time

== 2015 ==
2015 Wayne State Warriors football
- Conference: Great Lakes Intercollegiate Athletic Conference
- Record: 6–5 (5–5 GLIAC)
- Head coach: Paul Winters (12th season)
- Home stadium: Tom Adams Field

2015 Great Lakes Intercollegiate Athletic Conference football standings
	Conf.			Overall
Team	W		L	W		L
No. 6 Ferris State +^	10	–	0	11	–	1
No. 10 Ashland +^	10	–	0	10	–	1
No. 4 Grand Valley State ^	8	–	2	12	–	3
Ohio Dominican	7	–	3	8	–	3
Michigan Tech	7	–	3	7	–	3
Findlay	5	–	5	6	–	5
Wayne State (MI)	5	–	5	6	–	5
Hillsdale	5	–	5	5	–	6
Northwood	5	–	5	5	–	6
Northern Michigan	4	–	6	5	–	6
Tiffin	4	–	6	5	–	6
Walsh	2	–	8	2	–	8
Lake Erie	2	–	8	2	–	9
Saginaw Valley State	1	–	9	1	–	10
Malone	0	–	10	0	–	10
$ – Conference champion; ^ – NCAA Division II playoff participant; Rankings from AFCA poll

The 2015 Wayne State Warriors football team represented Wayne State University as a member of the Great Lakes Intercollegiate Athletic Conference (GLIAC) during the 2015 NCAA Division II football season. In their 12th year under head coach Paul Winters, the Warriors compiled a 6–5 record (5–5 in conference games), tied for sixth place in the GLiAC, and were outscored by a total of 319 to 305.

The team's key players included:

- Quarterback D.J. Zezuela completed 119 of 211 passes (56.4%) for 1,786 yards, 14 touchdowns, nine interceptions, and a 140.9 efficiency rating. Zezuela also tallied 133 rushing yads to give him 1,919 yards of total offense.
- Running back Romello Brown gained 1,348 rushing yards on 237 carries for an average of 5.4 yards per carry. Brown also led the team in scoring with 114 yards on 19 touchdowns.
- Wide receiver Jamel Hicks led the team with 50 receptions for 703 yards.
- Middle linebacker Anthony DeDamos led the team with 87 total tackles and 16.5 tackles for loss.

=== Schedule ===
Date	Time	Opponent	Site	Result	Attendance	Source
September 3	6:00 p.m.	at Michigan Tech	Sherman Field; Houghton, MI	L 15–20	2,645	
September 12	12:00 p.m.	Truman*	Tom Adams Field; Detroit, MI	W 21–20	2,868	
September 19	6:00 p.m.	Malone	Tom Adams Field; Detroit, MI	W 56–21	3,087	
September 26	1:00 p.m.	at Northwood	Hantz Stadium; Midland, MI	L 13–31	2,011	
October 3	3:00 p.m.	at Tiffin	Frost-Kalnow Stadium; Tiffin, OH	L 7–31	1,850	
October 10	6:00 p.m.	No. 24 Grand Valley State^{†}	Tom Adams Field; Detroit, MI	L 17–38	5,377	
October 17	12:00 p.m.	Northern Michigan	Tom Adams Field; Detroit, MI	W 34–31	1,994	
October 24	6:00 p.m.	at Walsh	Tom Benson Stadium; Canton, OH	W 31–16	2,315	
October 31	12:00 p.m.	Findlay	Tom Adams Field; Detroit, MI	W 31–26	1,982	
November 7	12:00 p.m.	Lake Erie	Tom Adams Field; Detroit, MI	W 56–54	1,892	
November 14	12:00 p.m.	at Hillsdale	Muddy Waters Stadium; Hillsdale, MI	L 24–31 ^{OT}	1,278	
*Non-conference game; ^{†}Homecoming; Rankings from AFCA Poll released prior to the game; All times are in Eastern time

== 2016 ==
2016 Wayne State Warriors football
- Conference: Great Lakes Intercollegiate Athletic Conference
- Record: 7–4 (7–4 GLIAC)
- Head coach: Paul Winters (13th season)
- Home stadium: Tom Adams Field

2016 Great Lakes Intercollegiate Athletic Conference football standings
	Conf.			Overall
Team	W		L	W		L
No. 4 Grand Valley State $^	10	–	0	12	–	1
No. 5 Ferris State ^	9	–	2	12	–	3
No. 19 Ashland	7	–	2	9	–	2
Tiffin	7	–	3	8	–	3
Ohio Dominican	7	–	4	7	–	4
Wayne State (MI)	7	–	4	7	–	4
Findlay	6	–	5	6	–	5
Saginaw Valley State	5	–	5	5	–	5
Hillsdale	4	–	5	5	–	5
Michigan Tech	4	–	6	4	–	6
Northern Michigan	3	–	7	3	–	8
Northwood	3	–	8	3	–	8
Walsh	0	–	10	1	–	10
Lake Erie	0	–	11	0	–	11
$ – Conference champion; ^ – NCAA Division II playoff participant; Rankings from AFCA poll

The 2016 Wayne State Warriors football team represented Wayne State University as a member of the Great Lakes Intercollegiate Athletic Conference (GLIAC) during the 2016 NCAA Division II football season. In their 13th year under head coach Paul Winters, the Warriors compiled a 7–4 record (7–4 in conference games), tied for fifth place in the GLiAC, and outscored opponents by a total of 296 to 205. The team was ranked No. 19 after winning seven of its first eight games, but fell from the rankings while losing its final three games.

The team's key players included:

- Quarterback Donovan Zezula completed 107 of 183 passes (58%) for 1,602 yards, 10 touchdowns, and six interceptions.
- Running back Romello Brown tallied 1,192 rushing yards on 185 carries for and average of 6.4 yards per carry.
- Wide receiver Jamel Hicks tallied 42 receptions for 705 yards.
- Middle linebacker Anthony DeDamos led the team with 48 total tackles.
- Defensive end Derrick Coleman led the team with 7.0 tackles for loss.

=== Schedule ===
Date	Time	Opponent	Rank	Site	Result	Attendance	Source
September 3	1:00 p.m.	at Northwood		Hantz Stadium; Midland, MI	W 28–3	2,504	
September 10	7:00 p.m.	at No. 5 Ashland		Jack Miller Stadium; Ashland, OH	L 25–36	2,067	
September 17	7:00 p.m.	Lake Erie		Tom Adams Field; Detroit, MI	W 50–7	3,469	
September 24	12:00 p.m.	Tiffin		Tom Adams Field; Detroit, MI	W 35–21	2,067	
October 1	12:00 p.m.	Hillsdale^{†}		Tom Adams Field; Detroit, MI	W 41–30	3,749	
October 8	12:00 p.m.	at Findlay		Donnell Stadium; Findlay, OH	W 37–21	873	
October 15	12:00 p.m.	Walsh	No. 25	Tom Adams Field; Detroit, MI	W 47–14	2,129	
October 22	12:00 p.m.	Saginaw Valley State	No. 22	Tom Adams Field; Detroit, MI	W 42–14	2,720	
October 29	1:00 p.m.	at No. 22 Ferris State	No. 19	Top Taggart Field; Big Rapids, MI	L 20–42	3,323	
November 5	12:00 p.m.	at Ohio Dominican		Panther Stadium; Columbus, OH	L 17–28	1,492	
November 12	12:00 p.m.	No. 2 Grand Valley State		Tom Adams Field; Detroit, MI	L 21–24	4,449	
^{†}Homecoming; Rankings from AFCA Poll released prior to the game; All times are in Eastern time

== 2017 ==
2017 Wayne State Warriors football
- Conference: Great Lakes Intercollegiate Athletic Conference
- Record: 5–6 (4–5 GLIAC)
- Head coach: Paul Winters (14th season)
- Defensive coordinator: Lou West (1st season)
- Home stadium: Tom Adams Field

2017 Great Lakes Intercollegiate Athletic Conference football standings
	Conf.			Overall
Team	W		L	W		L
No. 10 Ashland $^	9	–	0	11	–	2
No. 5 Ferris State ^	8	–	1	11	–	2
Grand Valley State	7	–	2	8	–	3
Tiffin	5	–	4	6	–	5
Northwood	5	–	4	7	–	4
Wayne State (MI)	4	–	5	5	–	6
Michigan Tech	3	–	6	4	–	7
Saginaw Valley State	3	–	6	5	–	6
Northern Michigan	1	–	8	1	–	9
Davenport *	0	–	9	1	–	10
$ – Conference champion; ^ – NCAA Division II playoff participant; * – Provisional Division II member; Rankings from AFCA poll

The 2017 Wayne State Warriors football team represented Wayne State University as a member of the Great Lakes Intercollegiate Athletic Conference during the 2017 NCAA Division II football season. In their 14th year under head coach Paul Winters, the Warriors compiled a 5–6 record (4–5 in conference games), finished sixth in the GLIAC, and were outscored by a total of 331 to 262. It was the program's first losing season since 2013.

The team's key players included:

- Quarterback D.J. Zezula completed 87 of 149 passes (58%) for 1,172 yards, 15 touchdowns, and four interceptions. He also tallied 182 rushing yards.
- Running back Romello Brown led the team with 827 rushing yards on 210 carries for an average of 3.9 yards per carry.
- Running back Demetrius Stinson ranked second in rushing with 798 yards on 140 carries and an average of 5.7 yards per carry.
- Wide receiver Corey Ester led the team with 30 receptions for 413 yards.
- Safety Kyle Toth led the team with 76 total tackles.
- Middle linebacker Anthony Pittman led the team with 12.5 tackles for loss and 3.5 sacks.

=== Schedule ===
Date	Time	Opponent	Site	TV	Result	Attendance
September 2	1:00 p.m.	at Walsh*	Tom Benson Stadium; North Canton, OH		W 28–9	1,250
September 9	6:00 p.m.	No. 18 Indianapolis*	Tom Adams Field; Detroit, MI	Comcast	L 28–31	3,473
September 16	6:00 p.m.	Saginaw Valley State	Tom Adams Field; Detroit, MI	Comcast	W 41–31	3,961
September 23	7:00 p.m.	at Tiffin	Frost-Kalnow Stadium; Tiffin, OH		L 21–41	2,456
September 30	3:00 p.m.	at No. 15 Ferris State	Top Taggart Field; Big Rapids, MI		L 17–59	6,448
October 7	6:00 p.m.	No. 8 Grand Valley State	Tom Adams Field; Detroit, MI	Comcast	L 27–45	3,133
October 14	6:00 p.m.	Northwood^{†}	Tom Adams Field; Detroit, MI	Comcast	L 10–20	3,114
October 21	1:00 p.m.	at Michigan Tech	Sherman Field; Houghton, MI		W 20–14	1,904
October 28	1:00 p.m.	No. 12 Ashland	Tom Adams Field; Detroit, MI	Comcast	L 10–30	2,157
November 4	12:00 p.m.	Northern Michigan	Tom Adams Field; Detroit, MI		W 26–24	2,954
November 11	12:00 p.m.	at Davenport	Farmers Athletic Complex; Grand Rapids, MI		W 34–27 ^{OT}	1,044
*Non-conference game; ^{†}Homecoming; Rankings from AFCA Poll released prior to the game; All times are in Eastern time

== 2018 ==
2018 Wayne State Warriors football
- Conference: Great Lakes Intercollegiate Athletic Conference
- Record: 2–9 (1–7 GLIAC)
- Head coach: Paul Winters (15th season)
- Defensive coordinator: Lou West (2nd season)
- Home stadium: Tom Adams Field

2018 Great Lakes Intercollegiate Athletic Conference football standings
	Conf.			Overall
Team	W		L	W		L
No. 2 Ferris State $^	8	–	0	15	–	1
No. 14 Grand Valley State ^	7	–	1	10	–	2
Ashland	6	–	2	6	–	4
Saginaw Valley State	5	–	3	8	–	3
Davenport *	3	–	5	6	–	5
Northwood	3	–	5	3	–	7
Michigan Tech	2	–	6	4	–	6
Northern Michigan	1	–	7	3	–	8
Wayne State (MI)	1	–	7	2	–	9
$ – Conference champion; ^ – NCAA Division II playoff participant; * – Provisional NCAA Division II member; Rankings from AFCA poll

The 2018 Wayne State Warriors football team represented Wayne State University as a member of the Great Lakes Intercollegiate Athletic Conference during the 2018 NCAA Division II football season. In their 15th year under head coach Paul Winters, the Warriors compiled a 2-9 record (1-7 in conference games), tied with Northern Michigan for last place in the GLIAC, and were outscored by a total of 230 to 222.

Key players included:

- Quarterback Jake AmRhein completed 101 of 186 passes (55%) for 1,434 yards, eight touchdowns, and 11 interceptions.
- Running back James Hill tallied 699 rushing yards on 106 carries for an average of 6.6 yards per carry.
- Wide receiver Derace Roberson Jr. tallied 21 receptions for 478 yards and six touchdowns. He also gained 267 yards on kickoff returns.
- Middle linebacker Anthony Pittman led the team with 54 total tackles.
- Outside linebacker Leon Eggleston led the team with 10.5 tackles for loss.

=== Schedule ===
Date	Time	Opponent	Site	Result	Attendance
August 30	6:00 p.m.	Walsh*	Tom Adams Field; Detroit, MI	W 31–0	3,433
September 8	6:00 p.m.	at No. 22 Indianapolis*	Key Stadium; Indianapolis, IN	L 6–28	2,936
September 15	6:00 p.m.	Ashland	Tom Adams Field; Detroit, MI	L 21–30	3,587
September 22	1:00 p.m.	at Saginaw Valley State	Harvey Randall Wickes Memorial Stadium; University Center, MI	L 29–35 ^{OT}	3,950
September 29	6:00 p.m.	Tiffin*	Tom Adams Field; Detroit, MI	L 13–27	2,434
October 6	6:00 p.m.	Davenport	Tom Adams Field; Detroit, MI	L 14–37	1,524
October 13	1:00 p.m.	at Michigan Tech	Sherman Field; Houghton, MI	L 20-23	1,941
October 20	6:00 p.m.	Northwood^{†}	Tom Adams Field; Detroit, MI	W 55–21	1,816
October 27	1:00 p.m.	at No. 2 Ferris State	Top Taggart Field; Big Rapids, MI	L 28–38	3,013
November 3	1:00 p.m.	Northern Michigan	Tom Adams Field; Detroit, MI	L 24–34	2,057
November 10	1:00 p.m.	No. 8 Grand Valley State	Lubbers Stadium; Allendale, MI	L 21-45	9,406
*Non-conference game; ^{†}Homecoming; Rankings from AFCA Poll released prior to the game; All times are in Eastern time

== 2019 ==
2019 Wayne State Warriors football
- Conference: Great Lakes Intercollegiate Athletic Conference
- Record: 8–3 (7–1 GLIAC)
- Head coach: Paul Winters (16th season)
- Defensive coordinator: Lou West (3rd season)
- Home stadium: Tom Adams Field

2019 Great Lakes Intercollegiate Athletic Conference football standings
	Conf.			Overall
Team	W		L	W		L
No. 3 Ferris State $^	8	–	0	12	–	1
Wayne State (MI)	7	–	1	8	–	3
Ashland	6	–	2	7	–	4
Grand Valley State	5	–	3	8	–	3
Davenport	3	–	5	5	–	5
Michigan Tech	3	–	5	5	–	5
Saginaw Valley State	3	–	5	5	–	6
Northwood	1	–	7	1	–	10
Northern Michigan	0	–	8	1	–	9
$ – Conference champion; ^ – NCAA Division II playoff participant; Rankings from AFCA poll

The 2019 Wayne State Warriors football team represented Wayne State University as a member of the Great Lakes Intercollegiate Athletic Conference (GLIAC) during the 2019 NCAA Division II football season. In their 16th year under head coach Paul Winters, the Warriors compiled an 8–3 record (7–1 in conference games) and finished second in the GLIAC. Due to blowout losses against No. 10 Slippery Rock (37–62) and No. 2 Ferris State (13–59), the Warriors were outscored by a total of 262 (29.2 points per game) to 255 (28.3 points per game). They concluded the season with a 31–17 victory over No. 19 Grand Valley State.

Key players for the team included:

- Running back Deiontae Nicholas led the team with 786 rushing yards on 128 carries for an average of 6.1 yards per carry.
- Quarterback Dakota Kupp completed 68 of 119 passes (57%) for 855 yards, seven touchdowns, and four interceptions.
- Wide receiver Darece Roberson Jr. tallied 28 receptions for 472 yards and seven touchdowns. Roberson also tallied 323 yards on kickoff returns

The defensive leaders included outside linebacker Leon Eggleston (81 total tackles, three interceptions), outside linebacker Brandon Tuck-Hayden (13.5 tackles for loss), and defensive end Jalen Lewis (6.5 sacks).

=== Schedule ===
Date	Time	Opponent	Site	Result	Attendance	Source
September 5	6:00 p.m.	No. 10 Slippery Rock*	Tom Adams Field; Detroit, MI	L 37–62	3,782	
September 14	1:00 p.m.	at Truman*	Stokes Stadium; Kirksville, MO	L 12–35	2,818	
September 21	2:00 p.m.	at Quincy*	QU Stadium; Quincy, IL	W 33–7	350	
September 28	6:00 p.m.	No. 25 Saginaw Valley State	Tom Adams Field; Detroit, MI	W 24–20	3,277	
October 5	1:00 p.m.	at Northern Michigan	Superior Dome; Marquette, MI	W 27–14	2,533	
October 12	6:00 p.m.	No. 2 Ferris State^{†}	Tom Adams Field; Detroit, MI	L 13–59	7,092	
October 19	6:00 p.m.	Ashland	Tom Adams Field; Detroit, MI	W 42–41 ^{2OT}	1,822	
October 26	1:00 p.m.	at Northwood	Hantz Stadium; Midland, MI	W 31–10	1,308	
November 2	12:00 p.m.	at Davenport	Farmers Athletic Complex; Grand Rapids, MI	W 34–0	1,029	
November 9	1:00 p.m.	Michigan Tech	Tom Adams Field; Detroit, MI	W 35–14	2,030	
November 16	1:00 p.m.	at No. 19 Grand Valley State	Lubbers Stadium; Allendale, MI	W 31–17	5,117	
*Non-conference game; ^{†}Homecoming; Rankings from AFCA Poll released prior to the game; All times are in Eastern time
