= 2011 Pittsburg State Gorillas football team =

American college football season

2011 Pittsburg State Gorillas football

NCAA Division II champion MIAA champion

NCAA Division II Championship Game, W 35–21 vs. Wayne State (MI)
- Conference: Mid-America Intercollegiate Athletics Association

Ranking
- AFCA: No. 1
- Record: 13–1 (8–1 MIAA)
- Head coach: Tim Beck (2nd season)
- Home stadium: Carnie Smith Stadium

2011 Mid-America Intercollegiate Athletics Association football standings
	Conf.			Overall
Team	W		L	W		L
No. 1 Pittsburg State $^	8	–	1	13	–	1
No. 5 NW Missouri State ^	7	–	2	11	–	3
No. 11 Washburn ^	7	–	2	10	–	3
No. 18 Missouri Western ^	7	–	2	9	–	3
Central Missouri #	6	–	3	8	–	4
Emporia State	3	–	6	5	–	6
Fort Hays State	3	–	6	4	–	7
Truman	2	–	7	4	–	7
Missouri Southern	2	–	7	3	–	7
Lincoln (MO)	0	–	9	1	–	9
$ – Conference champion; ^ – NCAA Division II playoff participant; # – Kanza Bowl participant; Rankings from AFCA poll

The 2011 Pittsburg State Gorillas football team represented Pittsburg State University during the 2011 NCAA Division II football season. The Gorillas played their home games at Carnie Smith Stadium in Pittsburg, Kansas, which has been the Gorillas' home stadium since 1924. The team was headed by coach Tim Beck. The team finished the regular season with a 9–1 record. This year they won their second NCAA Division II Football Championship (and fourth overall), with a win over the Wayne State Warriors, 35–21.

== Schedule ==
Date	Time	Opponent	Rank	Site	TV	Result	Attendance	Source
September 1	6:00 p.m.	at Missouri Western		Spratt Stadium; St. Joseph, MO		W 34–7	5,889	
September 10	7:00 p.m.	Emporia State	No. 25	Carnie Smith Stadium; Pittsburg, KS		W 38–14	8,637	
September 17	7:00 p.m.	at Truman	No. 19	Stokes Stadium; Kirksville, MO		W 27–26	4,323	
September 24	7:00 p.m.	William Jewell*	No. 15	Carnie Smith Stadium; Pittsburg, KS		W 49–7	9,355	
October 1	2:05 p.m.	vs. No. 1 Northwest Missouri State	No. 15	Arrowhead Stadium; Kansas City, MO (rivalry)		W 38–35	15,106	
October 8	7:00 p.m.	at Fort Hays State	No. 7	Lewis Field Stadium; Hays, KS		W 38–17	4,704	
October 15	2:00 p.m.	Lincoln (MO)	No. 7	Carnie Smith Stadium; Pittsburg, KS		W 69–6	9,915	
October 22	1:30 p.m.	at Central Missouri	No. 4	Walton Stadium; Warrensburg, MO		W 38–17	7,689	
November 5	2:00 p.m.	No. 9 Washburn	No. 2	Carnie Smith Stadium; Pittsburg, KS		L 25–43	9,053	
November 12		Missouri Southern	No. 9	Carnie Smith Stadium; Pittsburg, KS		W 51–28	7,886	
November 26	1:00 p.m.	No. 15 Washburn	No. 7	Carnie Smith Stadium; Pittsburg, KS (NCAA Division II Second Round)		W 31–22	6,936	
December 2	1:00 p.m.	No. 10 Northwest Missouri State	No. 7	Carnie Smith Stadium; Pittsburg, KS (NCAA Division II Quarterfinal)		W 41–16	9,047	
December 10	6:00 p.m.	No. 8 Delta State	No. 7	Carnie Smith Stadium; Pittsburg, KS (NCAA Division II Semifinal)		W 49–23	8,427	
December 17	10:00 a.m.	No. 2 Wayne State (MI)	No. 7	Braly Municipal Stadium; Florence, AL (NCAA Division II Championship Game)	ESPN2	W 35–21	7,276	
*Non-conference game; Rankings from American Football Coaches Association Poll released prior to the game; All times are in Central time
