= 1957 Pittsburg State Gorillas football team =

American college football season

1957 Pittsburg State Gorillas football

NAIA national champion CIC champion

NAIA Championship (Holiday Bowl), W 27–26 vs. Hillsdale
- Conference: Central Intercollegiate Conference
- Record: 11–0 (5–0 CIC)
- Head coach: Carnie Smith (9th season)
- Home stadium: Brandenburg Stadium

1957 Central Intercollegiate Conference football standings
	Conf.					Overall
Team	W		L		T	W		L		T
Pittsburg State $^	5	–	0	–	0	11	–	0	–	0
St. Benedict's	4	–	1	–	0	7	–	1	–	0
Fort Hays State	2	–	2	–	0	4	–	4	–	0
Washburn	2	–	3	–	0	5	–	4	–	0
Emporia State	1	–	3	–	0	2	–	7	–	0
Southwestern (KS)	0	–	5	–	0	1	–	8	–	0
$ – Conference champion; ^ – NAIA playoff participant

The 1957 Pittsburg State Gorillas football team was an American football team that represented Pittsburg State College (now known as Pittsburg State University) as a member of the Central Intercollegiate Conference (CIC) during the 1957 college football season. In their ninth season under head coach Carnie Smith, the Gorillas compiled a perfect 11–0 record (5–0 against CIC opponents) and outscored opponents by a total of 347 to 79. They won the CIC championship and defeated Hillsdale, 27–26, before a national television audience in the Holiday Bowl to win the NAIA championship.

Carnie Smith was the unanimous pick as the CIC Coach of the Year, and Tom Miller was named the CIC Lineman of the Year. A total of eleven Pittsburg State players were included on the All-CIC teams selected by the United Press (UP): quarterback John Matous (UP-2); halfbacks Dick Adamson (UP-1) and Bill Samuels (UP-2); fullback John Ewing (UP-1); end Carroll Cobble (UP-1); tackles Ted Stahura (UP-1) and Leonard Mansfield (UP-1); guards Miller (UP-1) and Kenny Yoss (UP-2); and center Robert Gordon (UP-2).

== Schedule ==
Date	Opponent	Site	Result	Attendance	Source
September 14	Truman State	Brandenburg Stadium; Pittsburg, KS	W 40–14		
September 21	at Southwest Missouri State	SMS Stadium; Springfield, MO	W 13–0		
September 28	Warrensburg State	Brandenburg Stadium; Pittsburg, KS	W 31–0		
October 5	at Missouri Mines	Rolla, MO	W 14–6		
October 12	St. Benedict's	Brandenburg Field; Pittsburg, KS	W 17–13		
October 19	Fort Hays State	Brandenburg Stadium; Pittsburg, KS	W 54–0		
October 26	at Washburn	Francis G. Welch Stadium; Topeka, KS	W 21–6		
November 2	at Emporia State	Emporia, KS	W 46–0		
November 9	Southwestern (KS)	Brandenburg Stadium; Pittsburg, KS	W 64–7		
November 16	at Northeastern State	Tahleuah, OK	W 20–7		
December 21	Hillsdale	St. Petersburg, FL (Holiday Bowl)	W 27–26	7,500	
