= Paul Winters (American football) =

American football player and coach (born 1958)

Biographical details
- Born: September 8, 1958 (age 68)

Playing career
- 1976–1979: Akron
- Position: Running back

Coaching career (HC unless noted)
- 1982–1983: Akron (GA)
- 1984–1985: Akron (backfield)
- 1986–1989: Toledo (off. backs)
- 1990: Wisconsin (RB)
- 1991: Wisconsin (TE)
- 1992–1994: Wisconsin (compliance)
- 1995–2003: Akron (OC/RB)
- 2004–2022: Wayne State (MI)

Head coaching record
- Overall: 94–105
- Tournaments: 4–1 (NCAA D-II playoffs)

Accomplishments and honors

Championships
- 1 GLIAC South Division (2010)

Awards
- AFCA NCAA Division II COY (2011); 3× GLIAC Coach of the Year (2006, 2008, 2019)

Paul Winters (born October 3, 1958) is an American college football coach and former player. He was the head football coach at Wayne State University from 2004 until 2022. Winters played college football at the University of Akron as a running back from 1976 to 1979.

== Biography ==
=== Playing career ===
Winters played high school football at St. Vincent–St. Mary High School in Akron, Ohio where he became a local prep star. He continued his career at the University of Akron (1976–1979) where he played the running back position. Winters finished his career seventh on the University of Akron's all-time leading rusher list with 2,613 yards. In 1989, Paul Winters was inducted into the University of Akron Sports Hall of Fame.

=== Coaching career ===
In 1982, Winters began his collegiate coaching career as a graduate assistant as his alma mater. He worked up the coaching ranks at Akron as an offensive backs coach until 1986 when he accepted the running backs coaching position at the University of Toledo. He moved on to the University of Wisconsin in 1990. Winters returned to Akron in 1995 as the offensive coordinator and running backs coach.

==== Wayne State ====
Winters accepted his first head coaching position on December 13, 2003, at Wayne State University. In his 10th season as head coach, Winters holds the school's overall record in wins with an overall record of 53 wins to 48 losses. Also, in 2011, Winters coached the school's single-season wins record team to 12 wins and a playoff berth. The 2011 team was the NCAA Division II runner-up after a loss to Pittsburg State in the National Championship game. After the 2011 season, Winters declined a job offer to return to the University of Akron as the head coach, instead choosing to sign an extension at Wayne State through 2016.

==== Honors ====
- NCAA Division II Coach of the Year by the American Football Coaches Association (2011)
- 2008 Expert Coaches Academy participant
- GLIAC Coach of the Year (2006, 2008, 2019)

In 2004, Paul Winters was regarded as one of the nation's top ten African-American football coaching candidates by the Black Coaches Association. On multiple occasions Winters has been recognized for his achievements as an ethnic minority football coach.

== Head coaching record ==
Year	Team	Overall	Conference	Standing	Bowl/playoffs	AFCA^{#}
Wayne State Warriors (Great Lakes Intercollegiate Athletic Conference) (2004–2022)
2004	Wayne State	1–9	1–9	13th		
2005	Wayne State	3–7	3–7	T–9th		
2006	Wayne State	6–5	6–4	T–4th		
2007	Wayne State	3–8	2–8	13th		
2008	Wayne State	8–3	7–3	T–3rd		
2009	Wayne State	6–5	5–5	8th		
2010	Wayne State	9–2	8–2	T–1st (South)		21
2011	Wayne State	12–4	7–3	2nd (South)	L NCAA Division II Championship	2
2012	Wayne State	5–5	5–5	6th (North)		
2013	Wayne State	3–8	3–7	T–6th (North)		
2014	Wayne State	7–4	6–4	3rd (North)		
2015	Wayne State	6–5	5–5	T–4th (North)		
2016	Wayne State	7–4	7–4	3rd (North)		
2017	Wayne State	5–6	4–5	6th		
2018	Wayne State	2–9	1–7	T–8th		
2019	Wayne State	8–3	7–1	2nd		
2020–21	No team—COVID-19					
2021	Wayne State	2–9	2–5	T–5th		
2022	Wayne State	1–9	0–6	7th		
Wayne State:		94–105	79–90			
Total:		94–105				
National championship Conference title Conference division title or championship game berth
