= Northwest Missouri State−Pittsburg State football rivalry =

American college football rivalry

- Northwest Missouri State Bearcats Pittsburg State Gorillas
- Sport: Football
- First meeting: September 30, 1932; Pittsburg State 25–0
- Latest meeting: November 15, 2025; Pittsburg State 27–14
- Next meeting: 2026
- Stadiums: Bearcat Stadium; Carnie Smith Stadium; Arrowhead Stadium

Statistics
- Total meetings: 58
- All-time series: Tied, 29–29
- Largest victory: Northwest Missouri, 69–10 (2016)
- Longest win streak: Pittsburg State, 10 (1983–1996)
- Current win streak: Pittsburg State, 4 (2022–present)

Locations of Northwest Missouri State and Pittsburg State

The Northwest Missouri State−Pittsburg State football rivalry is a college football game between Mid-America Intercollegiate Athletics Association (MIAA) rivals Northwest Missouri State University and Pittsburg State University. From 2002 to 2013, the game was known as the Fall Classic at Arrowhead was played at Arrowhead Stadium, home of the Kansas City Chiefs. The games were played at the teams' home field, due to being unable to reach terms with the Kansas City Chiefs, from 2014 to 2018. The game returned to Arrowhead Stadium in 2019 and was played at Children's Mercy Park home of Sporting Kansas City on November 15, 2025.

== Overview ==
While at Arrowhead, the Fall Classic drew more than 20,000 fans each year (including 26,695 in 2004), the largest attendance of any regular-season NCAA Division II sporting event.

Since 1991 the two MIAA rivals have appeared in 15 NCAA Division II National Football Championship title games. Pittsburg State is 2–3, winning in 1991 and 2011, and runner-up in 1992, 1995 and 2004. Northwest is 6–4, winning the titles in 1998, 1999, 2009, 2013, 2015 and 2016, and ending runner-up in 2005, 2006, 2007 and 2008. In addition to the regular season games, the two teams have also played each other the Division II playoffs in 2004, 2005, 2008 and 2011. The two teams have combined for at least a share of all but three MIAA championships since 1989.

In every matchup at Arrowhead except 2003, at least one of the teams was ranked in the Top 10 in Division II. In 2013, 2012, 2011, 2009, 2008, 2006 and 2004, both teams were in the Top 10. In 2004, the teams entered the game ranked no. 1 and no. 2.

On February 11, 2014, Northwest Missouri State announced on its website that it was unable to reach terms with the Kansas City Chiefs to continue the use of Arrowhead Stadium for the contest.

Northwest won ten of the thirteen games played at Arrowhead Stadium.

== Game results ==
Northwest Missouri State victories	Pittsburg State victories	Tie games

No.	Date	Location	Winner	Score
1	September 30, 1932	Pittsburg, KS	Pittsburg State	25–0
2	September 29, 1933	Maryville, MO	Pittsburg State	33–6
3	September 15, 1934	Pittsburg, KS	Pittsburg State	7–0
4	September 15, 1944	Pittsburg, KS	Northwest Missouri State	26–13
5	October 13, 1944	Maryville, MO	Northwest Missouri State	33–2
6	October 8, 1960	Pittsburg, KS	Pittsburg State	38–6
7	October 7, 1961	Maryville, MO	Pittsburg State	35–0
8	September 15, 1973	Pittsburg, KS	Northwest Missouri State	14–10
9	September 14, 1974	Maryville, MO	Northwest Missouri State	13–0
10	September 13, 1975	Maryville, MO	Northwest Missouri State	38–14
11	September 11, 1976	Pittsburg, KS	Northwest Missouri State	24–0
12	September 10, 1977	Maryville, MO	Northwest Missouri State	27–14
13	September 9, 1978	Pittsburg, KS	Pittsburg State	30–10
14	September 8, 1979	Maryville, MO	Pittsburg State	21–14
15	September 6, 1980	Pittsburg, KS	Pittsburg State	33–7
16	September 5, 1981	Maryville, MO	Northwest Missouri State	9–6
17	September 10, 1983	Pittsburg, KS	Pittsburg State	28–7
18	October 7, 1989	Pittsburg, KS	Pittsburg State	27–13
19	November 28, 1989	Pittsburg, KS	Pittsburg State	28–7^{A}
20	October 6, 1990	Maryville, MO	Pittsburg State	49–14
21	October 5, 1991	Pittsburg, KS	Pittsburg State	38–0
22	October 3, 1992	Maryville, MO	Pittsburg State	31–14
23	October 30, 1993	Pittsburg, KS	Pittsburg State	38–12
24	October 29, 1994	Maryville, MO	Pittsburg State	49–7
25	November 11, 1995	Pittsburg, KS	Pittsburg State	22–14
26	November 16, 1996	Maryville, MO	Pittsburg State	40–0
27	October 25, 1997	Pittsburg, KS	Northwest Missouri State	15–14
28	October 24, 1998	Maryville, MO	Northwest Missouri State	23–18
29	September 18, 1999	Pittsburg, KS	Northwest Missouri State	27–21
30	September 16, 2000	Maryville, MO	Northwest Missouri State	35–28

No.	Date	Location	Winner	Score
31	October 13, 2001	Pittsburg, KS	Northwest Missouri State	35–31
32	October 17, 2002	Kansas City, MO	Northwest Missouri State	29–7
33	November 15, 2003	Kansas City, MO	Northwest Missouri State	20–19
34	November 6, 2004	Kansas City, MO	Pittsburg State	21–17
35	November 27, 2004	Pittsburg, KS	Pittsburg State	50–36^{A}
36	October 29, 2005	Kansas City, MO	Pittsburg State	56–35
37	November 26, 2005	Pittsburg, KS	Northwest Missouri State	21–10^{A}
38	November 4, 2006	Kansas City, MO	Northwest Missouri State	41–14
39	October 6, 2007	Kansas City, MO	Northwest Missouri State	37–34
40	October 4, 2008	Kansas City, MO	Northwest Missouri State	35–10
41	November 22, 2008	Maryville, MO	Northwest Missouri State	38–35^{A}
42	October 4, 2009	Kansas City, MO	Northwest Missouri State	30–10
43	October 4, 2010	Kansas City, MO	Northwest Missouri State	22–16
44	October 1, 2011	Kansas City, MO	Pittsburg State	38–35
45	December 2, 2011	Pittsburg, KS	Pittsburg State	41–16^{A}
46	October 4, 2012	Kansas City, MO	Northwest Missouri State	31–21
47	October 4, 2013	Kansas City, MO	Northwest Missouri State	24–15
48	October 18, 2014	Maryville, MO	Pittsburg State	35–17
49	October 17, 2015	Pittsburg, KS	Northwest Missouri State	31–14
50	October 29, 2016	Maryville, MO	Northwest Missouri State	69–10
51	October 28, 2017	Maryville, MO	Pittsburg State	20–10
52	October 6, 2018	Pittsburg, KS	Northwest Missouri State	31–7
53	October 12, 2019	Kansas City, MO	Northwest Missouri State	38–17
54	October 9, 2021	Maryville, MO	Northwest Missouri State	20–19
55	October 8, 2022	Pittsburg, KS	Pittsburg State	24–22
56	October 21, 2023	Maryville, MO	Pittsburg State	28–7
57	November 16, 2024	Maryville, MO	Pittsburg State	23–7
58	November 15, 2025	Kansas City, KS	Pittsburg State	27–14
Series: Tied 29–29

^{A} During the 1989, 2004, 2005, 2008, and 2011 college football seasons, the Bearcats and Gorillas played twice; in this case, the second meeting was in the playoffs. All other seasons that the two teams played twice was considered a regular season game.

== See also ==
- List of NCAA college football rivalry games
