= Barney Chavous =

American football player (born 1951)

No. 79
- Position: Defensive end

Personal information
- Born: March 22, 1951 (age 75); Aiken, South Carolina, U.S.
- Listed height: 6 ft 3 in (1.91 m)
- Listed weight: 252 lb (114 kg)

Career information
- College: South Carolina State
- NFL draft: 1973: 2nd round, 36th overall pick

Career history
- Denver Broncos (1973–1985)

Awards and highlights
- First-team Little All-American (1972)

Career NFL statistics
- Sacks: 75
- Fumble recoveries: 8
- Safeties: 1
- Stats at Pro Football Reference

Barney Lewis Chavous (/ˈtʃeɪvʌs/ CHAY-vuhs; born March 22, 1951) is an American former professional football player who was a defensive end for the Denver Broncos of the National Football League (NFL). He played college football for South Carolina State Bulldogs. He was selected by the Associated Press as a first-team defensive end on the 1972 Little All-America college football team. He was selected by the Broncos in the second round of the 1973 NFL draft. He played 13 seasons with the Broncos, during which time the team had 11 winning seasons. At the time he retired, he was the Broncos all-time leader in quarterback sacks, and is fourth all-time (through 2025). He was part of the Broncos "Orange Crush Defense" that led the Broncos to Super Bowl XII.

== Early life ==
Chavous was born on March 22, 1951, in Aiken, South Carolina. His family went back seven generations in Aiken, and he worked on his family farm as a child. He graduated from Schofield High School in Aiken, where he started playing on the school's football team as a 6 ft 2 in (1.88 m) 210 lb (95.3 kg) junior.

== College career ==
Chavous attended South Carolina State University. He started four years as a defensive end on the school's football team the Bulldogs, playing under head coach Oree Banks in the Mid-Eastern Athletic Conference (MEAC). It has also been reported that he played both defensive end and defensive tackle in college.

The 6 ft 4 in (1.93 m) 250 lb (113.4 kg) Chavous was the Bulldogs' team captain as a senior in 1972. He was consistently timed at running the 40-yard dash in 4.7 or 4.8 seconds. As a senior he averaged 10 unassisted tackles per game, and was known for his quickness and mobility as a pass rusher. The Associated Press named Chavous a first-team Little All-American at defensive end that year, and Chavous was also selected first-team All-MEAC. Overall he was named to eight different All-America teams in 1972.

In 1972, as a senior, he was the first South Carolina State player ever invited to play in the North-South Shrine Game in Miami. He was also selected to play in the Senior Bowl, as well as the Coaches All-America Game in Lubbock, Texas.

== Professional career ==
The Denver Broncos selected Chavous in the second round of the 1973 NFL draft, 36th overall. He was surprised how high he was chosen, anticipating a possible selection in the fifth or sixth round; and was also surprised that Denver drafted him as he was not aware of their interest in him before then. He played his entire NFL career with the Broncos from 1973 to 1985, and was a key member of the Broncos' "Orange Crush Defense" of the 1970s. In 1973, he was reported to be 6 ft 4 in (1.93 m) 255 lb (115.7 kg) when he came to the Broncos' training camp. His NFL playing height and weight have also been listed as 6 ft 3 in 252 lb (114 kg).

As a rookie in 1973 Chavous started all 14 Broncos games, with six quarterback sacks and two fumble recoveries. It was reported in late July 1973 the Broncos began using Chavous as their starting left defensive end in training camp; and reported in August that he played left defensive end in 1973 preseason games, with Pete Duranko moved to tackle to make room for Chavous at end. It was reported the following August that Chavous had started every Broncos' game in the 1973 season at defensive end. Chavous was named the National Football League Players Association Rookie of the Year and Pittsburgh Courier Rookie of the Year, and United Press International and Pro Football Weekly named him to their All-Rookie teams at defensive end. It has also been stated that he was the Broncos starting right defensive tackle in the 1973 season.

In 1974, he started 14 games at left defensive end and had a career-high nine sacks, and two fumble recoveries. Defensive coach Doc Urick taught Chavous how to develop his pass rushing technique, rather than just relying on strength to manhandle offensive linemen; and to use film study on opposing linemen to prepare for games. In a November 1974 game against the Baltimore Colts, Chavous sacked Colts' quarterback Marty Domres four times. He also appeared to have an interception in that game, but was questionably ruled out of bounds by the officials. He received the Broncos' game ball for his defensive play in the game. In a September game against the Pittsburgh Steelers that ended in a 35–35 tie, Chavous and teammate Bill Thompson blocked a 25-yard Roy Gerela field goal attempt that could have won the game for the Steelers.

In 1975, Chavous started nine games at left defensive end, with 4.5 sacks. He was unable to play in five games that season because of a knee injury. He returned to play all 14 games in 1976, with eight sacks. The Broncos were 9–5 on the season. The Broncos defense allowed the sixth fewest points in the NFL that season, and gave up the third fewest rushing yards in the league. The Broncos switched to a 3–4 defense in 1976. Though there would be a number of right defensive ends in the Broncos' three-man defensive line from 1976 to 1985, Chavous was the starting left defensive end and Rubin Carter was the starting nose tackle for those 10 years.

In 1977, Chavous was part of Denver's Orange Crush Defense that was ranked first in rushing defense, and set an NFL record in allowing the fewest fourth quarter points. The Bronco's three-man front line that season included Chavous, Carter and All-Pro right defensive end Lyle Alzado. The four starting linebackers included, among others, future Hall of Fame inside linebacker Randy Gradishar and All-Pro outside linebacker Tom Jackson.

Chavous started 11 games at left defensive end, with eight quarterback sacks (tied for the team lead with Alzado). Chavous had 51 tackles and 31 assisted tackles during the regular season. The team finished the season 12–2, and made the playoffs for the first time in Chavous's career. The Broncos won the AFC championship, and played in Super Bowl XII, losing to the Dallas Cowboys, 27–10. Chavous started the Super Bowl at left defensive end. The Pittsburgh Courier named him Defensive Lineman of the Year.

In 1978, the NFL went to a 16 game schedule. Chavous started all 16 games for the Broncos at left defensive end for four consecutive seasons, from 1978 to 1981. He had four sacks each of those seasons, except 1980 when he had 4.5. The Broncos were 10–6 in 1978, and reached the divisional round of the playoffs, losing to the eventual Super Bowl XIII champion Pittsburgh Steelers, 33–10. The Broncos were 10–6 again in 1979, losing in the wild card playoff round to the Houston Oilers, 13–7. Chavous had one sack against Oilers' quarterback Dan Pastorini in that playoff game, for an 11-yard loss. Pastorini suffered a groin injury on the play, and missed the rest of the game.

Chavous played all nine games of the strike-shortened 1982 season, with five sacks. In the season’s last game, he recorded the only safety of his career against Dave Krieg of the Seattle Seahawks. The Broncos were 2–7 in 1982, but had winning seasons during Chavous's last three seasons, and were in the playoffs twice. Although he suffered a groin injury in 1983, Chavous started 13 games, with two forced fumbles, 4.5 sacks and a fumble recovery. In a November game against the Los Angeles Raiders, Broncos’ linebacker Tom Jackson sacked quarterback Jim Plunkett and stripped the ball. Chavous recovered the fumble in the endzone for the sole touchdown of his career. The Broncos went 9–7, losing to the Seahawks in the wild card round of 1983–84 playoffs.

The Broncos were 13–3 in 1984, finishing first in the AFC's West Division. The 33-year old Chavous started 15 games, with 7.5 sacks and one forced fumble. He missed only one game even though he had torn rib cartilage that season. The Broncos lost to the Steelers in the divisional round of the playoffs, 24–17. Chavous had a tackle for loss during the playoff game. The 1984 Broncos' defense allowed the second fewest points in the NFL. Although still a starter, he shared time at left defensive end with Walt Bowyer that season.

In Chavous's final season (1985), the Broncos were 11–5, but did not make the playoffs. Chavous ended his 13-year Bronco career by starting 15 games with six sacks and one fumble recovery. Chavous announced his retirement in August 1986. At the time he retired, Chavous was the Broncos' all-time sack leader. He ranks fourth on the Broncos' all-time sacks list with 75 (through 2025). Chavous believed that playing in the 3–4 defense increased the number of double teams from offensive lines that he had to face, and reduced the number of quarterback sacks he could have gotten if he had played more games in a 4–3 defense.

Chavous started 177 of the 183 games in which he appeared as a Bronco, and is tied with Tom Jackson for third in Broncos' career starts with 177. He is also said to have started 178 games. During his 13-year career with the Broncos, the team only had two losing seasons.

== Coaching career ==
Chavous spent 11 seasons in various coaching roles for the Broncos. He was originally brought in as a coaching intern by head coach Dan Reeves, eventually moving into assistant coaching positions under Reeves and then head coach Mike Shanahan. He served as an assistant offensive line coach, and strength and conditioning coach under Shanahan. He held those coaching positions at the time the Broncos won Super Bowl XXXII in 1998 over the Green Bay Packers, 31–24; and won Super Bowl XXXIII over the Atlanta Falcons, 34–19. He was later part of the team’s scouting staff.

== Legacy and honors ==
In 1986, Chavous was inducted into the Mid-Eastern Athletic Conference Hall of Fame. In May 1998, he was inducted into the South Carolina State University Athletics Hall of Fame. He was selected as a member of the Broncos Top 100 Team. In April 2024, he was inducted into the Colorado Sports Hall of Fame.

Chavous was known for being softspoken off the field, and for his hard work in physically preparing to play in NFL games, missing very few games over his long career.

== Personal life ==
He was a student teacher at Holly Hill's Roberts High School in Orangeburg, South Carolina as part of his college program at South Carolina State. During his playing days, he was considered religious and family oriented. Chavous was the head football coach at T. W. Josey High School in Augusta, Georgia. Chavous is the uncle of former Minnesota Vikings cornerback Corey Chavous. Now he works as a team sports coach at Tutt Middle school in Augusta, Georgia.
