= 2011 Winston-Salem State Rams football team =

American college football season

2011 Winston-Salem State Rams football

Black college national champion CIAA champion CIAA Southern Division champion

CIAA Championship Game, W 38–18 vs. Elizabeth City State

NCAA Division II Semifinal, L 14–21 vs. Wayne State
- Conference: Central Intercollegiate Athletic Association
- Southern Division

Ranking
- AFCA: No. 3
- Record: 13–1 (8–0 CIAA)
- Head coach: Connell Maynor (2nd season)
- Home stadium: Bowman Gray Stadium

2011 Central Intercollegiate Athletic Association football standings
	Conf.			Overall
Team	W		L	W		L
Northern Division
Elizabeth City State xy^	6	–	1	8	–	4
Virginia State	4	–	3	5	–	5
Virginia Union	3	–	4	5	–	5
Bowie State	3	–	4	4	–	6
Chowan	2	–	5	3	–	7
Lincoln (PA)	2	–	5	2	–	8
Southern Division
No. 3 Winston-Salem State xy$^	7	–	0	13	–	1
Johnson C. Smith #	4	–	3	6	–	5
Fayetteville State	4	–	3	4	–	6
St. Augustine's	3	–	4	4	–	6
Shaw	3	–	4	3	–	7
Livingstone	0	–	7	1	–	9
Championship: Winston–Salem State 38, Elizabeth City State
$ – Conference champion; x – Division champion/co-champions; y – Championship game participant; ^ – NCAA Division II playoff participant; # – Pioneer Bowl participant; Rankings from AFCA poll

The 2011 Winston-Salem State Rams football team represented Winston-Salem State University as a member of the Southern Division of the Central Intercollegiate Athletic Association (CIAA) during the 2011 NCAA Division II football season. Led by second-year head coach Connell Maynor, the Rams compiled an overall record of 13–1, with a conference record of 8–0, and finished as CIAA champion. At the conclusion of the season, Winston-Salem State was also recognized as black college national champion.

== Schedule ==
Date	Time	Opponent	Rank	Site	Result	Attendance	Source
September 3	6:00 p.m.	at Elizabeth City State		Roebuck Stadium; Elizabeth City, NC	W 22–17	4,712	
September 10	7:00 p.m.	at Virginia Union		Hovey Field; Richmond, VA	W 67–16	7,055	
September 17	6:00 p.m.	at Chowan		Garrison Stadium; Murfreesboro, NC	W 55–24		
September 24	6:00 p.m.	Fayetteville State	No. 22	Bowman Gray Stadium; Winston-Salem, NC	W 56–20	8,132	
October 1	1:30 p.m.	Johnson C. Smith^{†}	No. 21	Bowman Gray Stadium; Winston-Salem, NC	W 28–10	22,000	
October 8	1:30 p.m.	vs. St. Augustine's	No. 16	O'Kelly–Riddick Stadium; Durham, NC	W 35–28	4,289	
October 15	6:00 p.m.	at Livingstone	No. 13	Alumni Memorial Stadium; Salisbury, NC	W 63–7	1,147	
October 22	1:30 p.m.	Edward Waters*	No. 11	Bowman Gray Stadium; Winston-Salem, NC	W 59–7	3,758	
October 29	1:30 p.m.	Shaw	No. 9	Bowman Gray Stadium; Winston-Salem, NC	W 21–14	3,443	
November 5	2:00 p.m.	at UNC Pembroke*	No. 7	Grace P. Johnson Stadium; Pembroke, NC	W 34–7	3,455	
November 12	1:00 p.m.	vs. Elizabeth City State	No. 4	Durham County Memorial Stadium; Durham, NC (CIAA Championship Game)	W 38–18	10,127	
November 26	1:00 p.m.	No. 17 California (PA)*	No. 3	Bowman Gray Stadium; Winston-Salem, NC (NCAA Division II Second Round)	W 35–28	7,645	
December 3	12:00 p.m.	No. 5 New Haven*	No. 3	Bowman Gray Stadium; Winston-Salem, NC (NCAA Division II Quarterfinal)	W 27–7	6,143	
December 10	2:00 p.m.	Wayne State (MI)*	No. 3	Bowman Gray Stadium; Winston-Salem, NC (NCAA Division II Semifinal)	L 14–21	8,721	
*Non-conference game; ^{†}Homecoming; Rankings from AFCA Poll released prior to the game; All times are in Eastern time
