= 1972 Little All-America college football team =

1972 combined football team

The 1972 Little All-America college football team, also known as the College Division All-America football team, is composed of college football players from small colleges and universities who were selected by the Associated Press (AP) as the best players at each position. For 1972, the AP selected three teams, each team having separate offensive and defensive platoons.

== First team ==
Position	Player	Team
Offense
QB	Bob Biggs	UC Davis
RB	Jimmy Edwards	Northeast Louisiana
RB	Billy "White Shoes" Johnson	Widener
RB	Mike Deutsch	North Dakota
WR	Roger Carr	Louisiana Tech
TE	James Moore	McNeese State
T	David Taylor	Catawba
T	Robert Woods	Tennessee State
G	Gary Kipling	South Dakota
G	Curtis Wester	East Texas State
C	Bob Daigle	Southwest Texas State
Defense
DE	Joe Carpone	Delaware
DE	Barney Chavous	South Carolina State
DT	Gary "Big Hands" Johnson	Grambling
DT	Elex Price	Alcorn A&M
LB	Waymond Bryant	Tennessee State
LB	Stan Cherry	Morgan State
LB	Brian Kelley	Cal Lutheran
LB	Jim Youngblood	Tennessee Tech
DB	Mike Amos	Cal Poly
DB	Steve Dennis	Grambling
DB	Bruce Polen	William Penn

== Second team ==
Position	Player	Team
Offense
QB	Joe Carpone	Delaware
RB	Don Aleksiweicz	Hobart
RB	Johnny Baker	Ouachita Baptist
RB	Kenneth Parks	East Texas State
WR	Tim George	Carson–Newman
TE	Ron Mayo	Morgan State
T	Bracey Bonham	North Carolina Central
T	Paul Krause	Central Michigan
G	David Nollner	Western Kentucky
G	Bob Poss	Indiana State
C	Mark Walsh	Illinois Benedictine
Defense
DE	Ed "Too Tall" Jones	Tennessee State
DE	Archie Pearmon	Northeastern Oklahoma State
DT	Dennis Johnson	Delaware
DT	Bill Kollar	Montana State
LB	Ron Klawitter	Wittenberg
LB	Steve Nelson	North Dakota State
LB	Larry Rawlinson	McNeese State
LB	Steve Yates	Western Carolina
DB	Mike Holmes	Texas Southern
DB	Doug Jones	Cal State Northridge
DB	Don Walker	Central State (OH)

== Third team ==
Position	Player	Team
Offense
QB	Kim McQuilken	Lehigh
RB	Harold Hill	Glassboro State
RB	Chuck Markey	Central Michigan
RB	Phil Pope	Middlebury
WR	Chuck Cornell	Bridgeport
TE	Bill Schlegel	Lehigh
T	Stan Durant	Bucknell
T	Connie Wassink	Northwestern (IA)
G	Joe Kotval	Buena Vista
G	Marc Crevier	Ashland
C	Mike Evanson	North Dakota State
Defense
DE	Harvey Martin	East Texas State
DE	Tom Ramsey	Northern Arizona
DT	Fred Dean	Louisiana Tech
DT	Mike Samples	Drake
LB	Wiley Epps	Kentucky State
LB	Mike Leidy	Hampden–Sydney
LB	Ken Pettus	Newberry
LB	Gary Weaver	Fresno State
DB	Dave Balmeri	IUP
DB	Phil Borlas	Fresno State
DB	Tom Rezzuti	Northeastern

== See also ==
- 1972 College Football All-America Team
