= Steve Dennis (Canadian football) =

American gridiron football player (1951–2026)

Profile
- Position: Defensive back

Personal information
- Born: July 25, 1951; Shreveport, Louisiana, U.S.
- Died: January 24, 2026 (aged 74)
- Listed height: 6 ft 4 in (1.93 m)
- Listed weight: 185 lb (84 kg)

Career information
- College: Grambling State

Career history
- 1975–1976: Toronto Argonauts
- 1977–1984: Saskatchewan Roughriders

Awards and highlights
- First-team Little All-American (1972); CFL East All-Star (1976)

Steve Dennis (July 25, 1951 – January 24, 2026) was a Canadian gridiron football player. He played in the Canadian Football League (CFL) for ten years. Dennis played defensive back for the Toronto Argonauts and Saskatchewan Roughriders from 1975 to 1984. He played college football at Grambling State University. He was selected by the Associated Press as a first-team defensive back on the 1972 Little All-America college football team. Dennis died on January 24, 2026, at the age of 74.
