= Mike Mayerske =

American football player and coach (1942–2022)

Biographical details
- Born: September 24, 1942; Uniontown, Pennsylvania, U.S.
- Died: October 28, 2022 (aged 80)

Playing career
- 1961–1962: Coffeyville
- 1963–1964: Pittsburg State
- Position: Running back

Coaching career (HC unless noted)
- 1966–1969: St. Joseph HS (IN) (assistant)
- 1970–1971: Marian HS (IN)
- 1972–1976: Concord HS (IN)
- 1977–1981: Columbus HS (KS)
- 1983: Pittsburg State (assistant)
- 1984: Pittsburg State (interim HC)
- 1985: Pittsburg State (DB)

Head coaching record
- Overall: 5–4 (college)

Michael Richard Mayerske (September 24, 1942 – October 28, 2022) was an American football coach. He was the 11th head football coach at Pittsburg State University in Pittsburg, Kansas, serving as interim head coach in 1984, and compiling a record of 5–4.

== Early years ==
A native of Pennsylvania, Mayerske played high school football for Redstone High School from 1957 to 1960. After graduating, he received a scholarship in track and football from Coffeyville Junior College in Kansas. In September 1962, Mayerske ranked fifth in the nation for junior colleges in rushing. He transferred to Kansas State University of Pittsburg in 1963, and was an all-conference running back with the team.

== Coaching career ==
After graduating, Mayerske accepted a coaching position at St. Joseph High School as track coach and assistant football coach. He left for Marian High School in 1970, and was named head football coach at Concord High School in 1972. When he joined Concord, the school was in a 23-game losing streak. He coached them for five years, and led them to a winning record in each season. At Concord, he was also assistant dean of students, a physical education teacher, track coach, and supervisor of the intramural program.

He was named head coach at Columbus High School in 1977. He remained with the team for five years, before being fired in 1981 after a locker room incident in which he reportedly injured a student. In 1983, after being out of coaching for a year, he was hired by his alma mater, Pittsburg State University, as an assistant coach. He was named offensive coordinator in January 1984, but was promoted to head coach after they did not renew the contract of Bruce Polen. He returned to the team in 1985 as defensive secondary coach after compiling a 5–4 record as head coach, and retired the following year.

== Family and later years ==
Mayerske married Kaylene Gay Banzet in August 1963 at Coffeyville, Kansas.

== Death ==
Mayerske died on October 28, 2022 at the age of 80.

== Head coaching record ==
=== College ===
Year	Team	Overall	Conference	Standing	Bowl/playoffs
Pittsburg State Gorillas (Central States Intercollegiate Conference) (1984)
1984	Pittsburg State	5–4	4–3	T–4th	
Pittsburg State:		5–4	4–3		
Total:		5–4			
