= Waymond Bryant =

American football player (born 1952)

No. 50
- Position: Linebacker

Personal information
- Born: July 28, 1952 (age 74); Dallas, Texas, U.S.
- Listed height: 6 ft 4 in (1.93 m)
- Listed weight: 236 lb (107 kg)

Career information
- High school: Franklin D. Roosevelt (Dallas, Texas)
- College: Tennessee State
- NFL draft: 1974: 1st round, 4th overall pick

Career history
- Chicago Bears (1974–1978)

Awards and highlights
- 2× First-team Little All-American (1972, 1973)

Career NFL statistics
- Sacks: 7.5
- Interceptions: 4
- Interception yards: 17
- Fumble recoveries: 9
- Stats at Pro Football Reference

Waymond Bryant (born July 28, 1952) is an American entrepreneur and former professional football player. He played as a linebacker for the Chicago Bears of the National Football League (NFL) for four seasons.

== Early life and college career ==
Bryant was born in Dallas, Texas and attended Franklin D. Roosevelt High School in Dallas. He played college football at Tennessee State University. He was selected by the Associated Press as a first-team linebacker on the 1972 Little All-America college football team.

== Professional career ==
Bryant was selected fourth overall in the first round of the 1974 NFL draft by the Chicago Bears. He played four seasons in the National Football League. He suffered a stomach ulcer throughout his first season but played anyway. In his earlier seasons, he was frequently compared to fellow Bears linebacker Dick Butkus, who had recently retired.

In 1977, Bryant was moved from middle linebacker to outside linebacker. Near the end of an October 10, 1977 game versus the Los Angeles Rams, he hit quarterback Joe Namath. Namath did not return to the game and never played professional football again.

In a 1977 game against the Houston Oilers, Bryant injured his right shoulder. He played the rest of the season, but during the subsequent offseason, he discovered that he had suffered serious nerve damage. He played some games during the 1978 season, but was eventually placed on injured reserve. He tried to return to the league in 1980, but no team took him, and he did not play again after 1978.

== Later life ==
After leaving the NFL, Bryant kept a low profile. He opened Bryant Enterprises, a small flooring business in the Dallas area.
