= Tom Lester (American football) =

American football coach (1927–2012)

Biographical details
- Born: January 23, 1927; Drumright, Oklahoma, U.S.
- Died: September 2, 2012 (aged 85); Overland Park, Kansas, U.S.

Playing career

Football
- 1948–1951: Pittsburg State
- Position: End

Coaching career (HC unless noted)

Football
- 1952–1954: Caldwell HS (KS)
- 1955–1960: Atchison HS (KS)
- 1961–1966: Pittsburg State (freshman)
- 1967–1975: Pittsburg State

Basketball
- 1952–1954: Caldwell HS (KS)

Head coaching record
- Overall: 48–38–5 (college football); 51–21–3 (high school football)

Accomplishments and honors

Championships
- Football; RMAC (1970)

Awards
- Football; All-CIC (1951)

Thomas Arthur Lester (January 23, 1927 – September 2, 2012) was an American college football coach. He was the eighth head football coach at Kansas State College of Pittsburg—now known as Pittsburg State University—in Pittsburg, Kansas, serving for nine seasons, from 1967 to 1975, and compiling a record of 48–38–5. Prior to becoming head coach, he served as the freshman coach six seasons.

Lester was the head football coach for Caldwell High School and Atchison High School and compiled a record of 51–21–3. He also coached basketball for Caldwell.

Lester was an All-Central Intercollegiate Conference (CIC) end for Pittsburg State from 1948 to 1951.

== Head coaching record ==
=== College football ===
Year	Team	Overall	Conference	Standing	Bowl/playoffs
Pittsburg State Gorillas (Central Intercollegiate Conference) (1967–1968)
1967	Pittsburg State	6–2–1	3–1	2nd	
1968	Pittsburg State	4–5–1	2–1–1	T–2nd	
Pittsburg State Gorillas (Rocky Mountain Athletic Conference) (1969–1971)
1969	Pittsburg State	5–5	2–3	6th (Plains)	
1970	Pittsburg State	9–2	4–1	1st (Plains)	
1971	Pittsburg State	8–1–1	3–1–1	2nd (Plains)	
Pittsburg State Gorillas (Great Plains Athletic Conference) (1972–1975)
1972	Pittsburg State	5–5	3–3	T–4th	
1973	Pittsburg State	3–7	2–3	T–3rd	
1974	Pittsburg State	4–7	4–1	2nd	
1975	Pittsburg State	4–4–2	3–2	T–2nd	
Pittsburg State:		48–38–5	26–16–2		
Total:		48–38–5			
National championship Conference title Conference division title or championship game berth
