= Carnie Smith =

American football player and coach (1911–1979)

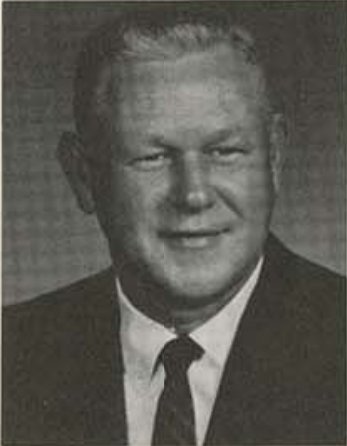
- Smith pictured in The Kanza 1962, Pittsburg State yearbook

Biographical details
- Born: January 29, 1911; Weir, Kansas, U.S.
- Died: January 25, 1979 (aged 67); Pittsburg, Kansas, U.S.

Playing career

Football
- 1930–1932: Kansas

Baseball
- 1931–1932: Kansas
- Position: Quarterback (football)

Coaching career (HC unless noted)

Football
- 1933–1934: West Mineral HS (KS)
- 1935–1940: Paola HS (KS)
- 1946: Parsons (KS)
- 1947: California (GA)
- 1948: Santa Rosa
- 1949–1966: Pittsburg State

Basketball
- 1933–1935: West Mineral HS (KS)
- 1946–1947: Parsons (KS)

Administrative career (AD unless noted)
- 1966–1976: Pittsburg State

Head coaching record
- Overall: 116–52–6 (college football)
- Bowls: 1–0
- Tournaments: 3–0 (NAIA playoffs)

Accomplishments and honors

Championships
- 2 NAIA (1957, 1961); 6 CIC (1949, 1951, 1955, 1957, 1961, 1966)

Awards
- NAIA Coach of the Year (1961); First-team All-Big Six (1930); Second-team All-Big Six (1931)

Carnie Henry Smith (January 29, 1911 – January 25, 1979) was an American college football player and coach. Smith was the seventh head football coach at Pittsburg State University in Pittsburg, Kansas. He held that position for 18 seasons, from 1949 until 1966, compiling a record of 116–52–6. His teams won NAIA football national championships in 1957 and 1961. The football stadium at Pittsburg State, Carnie Smith Stadium, is named in his honor.

Smith starred as a quarterback at Arma High School in Arma, Kansas, and then played football and baseball at the University of Kansas. In 1944, Smith was working as assistant director of recreation at a Pratt & Whitney plant before he was commissioned as a lieutenant in the United States Naval Reserve. After serving in the Navy during World War II, he coached football and basketball at Parsons Junior College—now known as Labette Community College—in Parsons, Kansas. Smith went to the University of California, Berkeley in 1947, where he served as a graduate assistant for the football team under Pappy Waldorf and earned a master's degree in physical education. In 1948, he was hired as the head football coach at Santa Rosa Junior College in Santa Rosa, California.

Smith died on January 25, 1979, at his home in Pittsburg, following a long illness.

== Head coaching record ==
=== College football ===
| Year | Team | Overall | Conference | Standing | Bowl/playoffs |
|---|---|---|---|---|---|
Pittsburg State Gorillas (Central Intercollegiate Conference) (1949–1966)
| 1949 | Pittsburg State | 8–2–1 | 5–1 | T–1st | |
| 1950 | Pittsburg State | 5–5 | 4–1 | 2nd | L Mizra Shrine Bowl |
| 1951 | Pittsburg State | 7–3 | 4–1 | T–1st | |
| 1952 | Pittsburg State | 5–4–1 | 2–2–1 | 4th | |
| 1953 | Pittsburg State | 6–3–1 | 2–2–1 | T–3rd | |
| 1954 | Pittsburg State | 6–2 | 3–2 | 3rd | |
| 1955 | Pittsburg State | 7–3 | 5–0 | 1st | |
| 1956 | Pittsburg State | 7–2–1 | 3–1–1 | T–2nd | |
| 1957 | Pittsburg State | 11–0 | 5–0 | 1st | W NAIA Championship (Holiday) |
| 1958 | Pittsburg State | 4–5–1 | 3–2 | 2nd | |
| 1959 | Pittsburg State | 6–3 | 4–1 | 2nd | |
| 1960 | Pittsburg State | 8–1 | 4–1 | 2nd | |
| 1961 | Pittsburg State | 11–0 | 5–0 | 1st | W NAIA Championship (Camellia) |
| 1962 | Pittsburg State | 6–3 | 3–2 | 3rd | |
| 1963 | Pittsburg State | 5–3–1 | 2–1–1 | 2nd | |
| 1964 | Pittsburg State | 4–5 | 2–2 | T–2nd | |
| 1965 | Pittsburg State | 3–6 | 2–2 | 3rd | |
| 1966 | Pittsburg State | 7–2 | 3–1 | T–1st | |
| Pittsburg State: | | 116–52–6 | 61–22–4 | | |
| Total: | | 116–52–6 | | | |
National championship Conference title Conference division title or championship game berth

=== Junior college football ===
| Year | Team | Overall | Conference | Standing | Bowl/playoffs |
|---|---|---|---|---|---|
Parsons Cardinals (Kansas Junior College Conference) (1946)
| 1946 | Parsons | | 0–6 | 10th | |
| Parsons: | | | 0–6 | | |
Santa Rosa Bear Cubs (Northern California Junior College Conference) (1948)
| 1948 | Santa Rosa | 6–4 | 4–3 | 2nd (B Division) | |
| Santa Rosa: | | 6–4 | 4–3 | | |
| Total: | | | | | |
