= Lou West =

American football player and coach (born 1953)

Biographical details
- Born: December 29, 1953 (age 72); Niles, Ohio, U.S.

Playing career
- 1973–1976: Cincinnati
- Position: Defensive back

Coaching career (HC unless noted)
- 1977: Arizona (GA)
- 1978–1979: Arizona Western (DB)
- 1981–1982: Middle Tennessee (DB)
- 1983: Minnesota (DB)
- 1984–1985: Western Michigan (OLB/DB)
- 1986–1987: Kansas (DB)
- 1988: Cincinnati (DB)
- 1989–1991: Cincinnati (OLB)
- 1992: Cincinnati (TE)
- 1993: Cincinnati (DB)
- 1994: Kent State (DB)
- 1995–1998: Virginia Tech (DB)
- 1999–2000: Notre Dame (S)
- 2001–2004: Toledo (DC)
- 2005–2007: Indiana State
- 2009–2010: Rose-Hulman (ST/DB)
- 2011–2012: Garden City (DC)
- 2013–2014: Mississippi Delta (DB)
- 2015–2016: Alabama State (DB/OLB/TE)
- 2017–2021: Wayne State (MI) (co-DC/DB)

Head coaching record
- Overall: 1–25

Lou West (born December 29, 1953) is an American former college football coach and player.

== Career ==
He was the co-defensive coordinator and secondary coach at Wayne State University in Detroit, Michigan. West served as the head football coach at Indiana State University in Terre Haute, Indiana from 2005 to 2007, compiling a record of 1–25. After his college football playing career at the University of Cincinnati, he was selected in the 11th round by the Pittsburgh Steelers in the 1977 NFL draft.

== Head coaching record ==
Year	Team	Overall	Conference	Standing	Bowl/playoffs
Indiana State Sycamores (Gateway Football Conference) (2005–2007)
2005	Indiana State	0–11	0–7	8th	
2006	Indiana State	1–10	1–6	8th	
2007	Indiana State	0–4 (Note: West was fired after the first four games of the 2007 season. Dennis Raetz was appointed as interim head coach and led Indiana State for the final seven games of the season. The Sycamores finished 0–11 overall and 0–6 in conference play, placing seventh.)	0–1		
Indiana State:		1–25	1–14		
Total:		1–25			
