= Tim Beck (American football, born 1964) =

American football player and coach (born 1964)

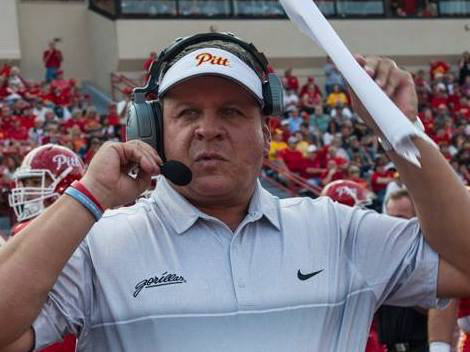
- Beck at a football game in 2016

Current position
- Title: Offensive coordinator
- Team: Vanderbilt
- Conference: SEC

Biographical details
- Born: January 18, 1964 (age 62); Ness City, Kansas, U.S.

Playing career
- 1985–1986: Pittsburg State
- Position: Defensive back

Coaching career (HC unless noted)
- 1987: Pittsburg State (SA)
- 1988: Pittsburg State (GA)
- 1989–1991: Pittsburg State (assistant)
- 1992–1993: Pittsburg State (DC)
- 1994–2009: Pittsburg State (OC)
- 2010–2019: Pittsburg State
- 2021: TCU (off. analyst)
- 2022–2023: New Mexico State (OC/QB)
- 2024–present: Vanderbilt (OC)

Head coaching record
- Overall: 82–35
- Bowls: 2–0
- Tournaments: 5–1 (NCAA D-II playoffs)

Accomplishments and honors

Championships
- 1 NCAA Division II (2011); 2 MIAA (2011, 2014)

Awards
- Liberty Mutual Coach of the Year Award (2011)

Timothy D. Beck (born January 18, 1964) is an American college football coach and former player. He is currently the offensive coordinator at Vanderbilt University. He was previously an offensive analyst for the TCU Horned Frogs football program for the 2021 season. Beck served as the head football coach at Pittsburg State University in Pittsburg, Kansas from 2010 to 2019, compiling a record of 82–35. He led the 2011 Pittsburg State Gorillas football team to the NCAA Division II Football Championship. Beck played college football at Pittsburg State from 1985 to 1986 and was an assistant coach with the program from 1987 to 2009.

== Head coaching record ==
Year	Team	Overall	Conference	Standing	Bowl/playoffs	AFCA^{#}
Pittsburg State Gorillas (Mid-America Intercollegiate Athletics Association) (2010–2019)
2010	Pittsburg State	6–6	3–6	T–6th	W Mineral Water	
2011	Pittsburg State	13–1	8–1	1st	W NCAA Division II Championship	1
2012	Pittsburg State	7–3	7–3	T–4th		
2013	Pittsburg State	10–2	7–2	3rd	W Mineral Water	19
2014	Pittsburg State	11–2	10–1	T–1st	L NCAA Division II Second Round	7
2015	Pittsburg State	6–5	6–5	T–5th		
2016	Pittsburg State	7–4	7–4	T–4th		
2017	Pittsburg State	7–4	7–4	T–4th		
2018	Pittsburg State	8–3	8–3	3rd		
2019	Pittsburg State	6–5	6–5	T–5th		
Pittsburg State:		82–35	69–34			
Total:		82–35				
National championship Conference title Conference division title or championship game berth
^{#}Rankings from AFCA.
