= Bruce Polen =

American football player and coach (born 1951)

Biographical details
- Born: October 22, 1951 (age 75); Dennison, Ohio, U.S.
- Education: William Penn College (BA); Central Missouri State University (MA)

Playing career
- 1969–1972: William Penn
- 1973: Oakland Raiders
- 1974–1975: Kansas City Chiefs
- Position: Defensive back

Coaching career (HC unless noted)
- 1976–1981: Pittsburg State (DC)
- 1982–1983: Pittsburg State

Head coaching record
- Overall: 13–6

Accomplishments and honors

Championships
- 1 CSIC (1982)

Awards
- As a player: First-team Little All-American (1972)

Bruce Polen (born October 22, 1951) is an American former college football coach who was the tenth head football coach at Pittsburg State University in Pittsburg, Kansas, serving for two seasons, from 1982 until 1983, compiling a record of 13–6. He played college football for the William Penn Statesmen. He was selected by the Oakland Raiders Polen in the 14th round of the 1973 NFL draft.

== Playing career ==
Polen was born in Dennison, Ohio, but later moved to Lee's Summit, Missouri. He played football at and graduated from Lee's Summit High School in 1969. He was not heavily recruited out of high school and attended William Penn College in Oskaloosa, Iowa. Polen was a four-year starter at defensive back on the football under head coach Ron Randleman, and also played baseball and ran track. He was selected by the Associated Press as a first-team defensive back on the 1972 Little All-America college football team.

The Oakland Raiders selected Polen 361st overall in the 14th round of the 1973 NFL draft, but cut him prior to the start of the season. The Kansas City Chiefs signed him the following year, but he suffered an injury to his left knee during spring camp. Polen underwent two surgeries, in 1974 and 1975, but the Chiefs cut him afterwards when he failed a physical. In 1978 successfully sued the Research Medical Center in Kansas City, Missouri, for botching the post-surgery physical therapy on his knee and ending his playing career.

== Coaching career ==
His playing career over, Polen turned to coaching. Randleman, his head coach at William Penn, was the incoming head coach at Pittsburg State University in Pittsburg, Kansas. Pittsburg competed in the Central States Intercollegiate Conference (CSIC), part of the National Association of Intercollegiate Athletics (NAIA). Randleman hired him as his defensive coordinator, a role he filled from 1976 to 1981. The 1981 team went 10–2 and lost the NAIA Division I Championship. Randleman departed after the season to become head coach at Sam Houston State University, then in the NCAA Division II Lone Star Conference. Polen was to be Randleman's defensive coordinator at Sam Houston, but after a week returned to Pittsburg State and took over as head coach.

Polen was head coach from 1982 to 1983. Over those two years he compiled a 13–6 record and won a conference title. Pittsburg State did not renew Polen's contract for the 1984 season. Offensive coordinator Mike Mayerske took over as interim head coach; Dennis Franchione was hired as a permanent replacement in 1985.

== After coaching ==
Polen did not return to coaching and went into business, remaining in the Pittsburg area. He and Randleman, who retired from Sam Houston State in 2004 after 23 seasons, have remained close friends. Polen was inducted into William Penn's athletic hall of fame in 1990 and the National Association of Intercollegiate Athletics hall of fame in 2020. In addition to his business activities, Polen has done some coaching at Parsons Senior High School in Parsons, Kansas, down the road from Pittsburg.

== Head coaching record ==
| Year | Team | Overall | Conference | Standing | Bowl/playoffs |
|---|---|---|---|---|---|
Pittsburg State Gorillas (Central States Intercollegiate Conference) (1982–1983)
| 1982 | Pittsburg State | 7–2 | 6–1 | T–1st | |
| 1983 | Pittsburg State | 6–4 | 4–3 | T–3rd | |
| Pittsburg State: | | 13–6 | 10–4 | | |
| Total: | | 13–6 | | | |
National championship Conference title Conference division title or championship game berth
