= Pittsburg State Gorillas football =

College Football team

- First season: 1908; 118 years ago
- Athletic director: Jim Johnson
- Location: Pittsburg, Kansas
- Stadium: Carnie Smith Stadium (capacity: 8,343)
- Field: Brandenburg Field
- NCAA division: Division II
- Conference: The MIAA
- Colors: Crimson and gold
- All-time record: 753–365–47 (.667)
- Bowl record: 3–0 (1.000)

NCAA Division II championships
- 1991, 2011

NAIA national championships
- 1957, 1961

Conference championships
- 33
- Rivalries: Missouri Southern; Northwest Missouri State
- Fight song: PSU Fight Song
- Mascot: Gus the Gorilla
- Marching band: Pride of the Plains Marching Band
- Outfitter: Nike
- Website: www.pittstategorillas.com

The Pittsburg State Gorillas football team represents Pittsburg State University in collegiate level football. The Pittsburg State football team was formed in 1908, competes in NCAA Division II and is affiliated with the Mid-America Intercollegiate Athletics Association (MIAA). The Gorillas play their home games at Carnie Smith Stadium, more commonly referred to as "The Jungle", in Pittsburg, Kansas. Pittsburg State has won more games than any other program in NCAA Division II history. It has won four national championships (1957, 1961, 1991 and 2011) and 27 conference championships, including 13 conference titles in 20 seasons under former head coach Chuck Broyles.

== History ==
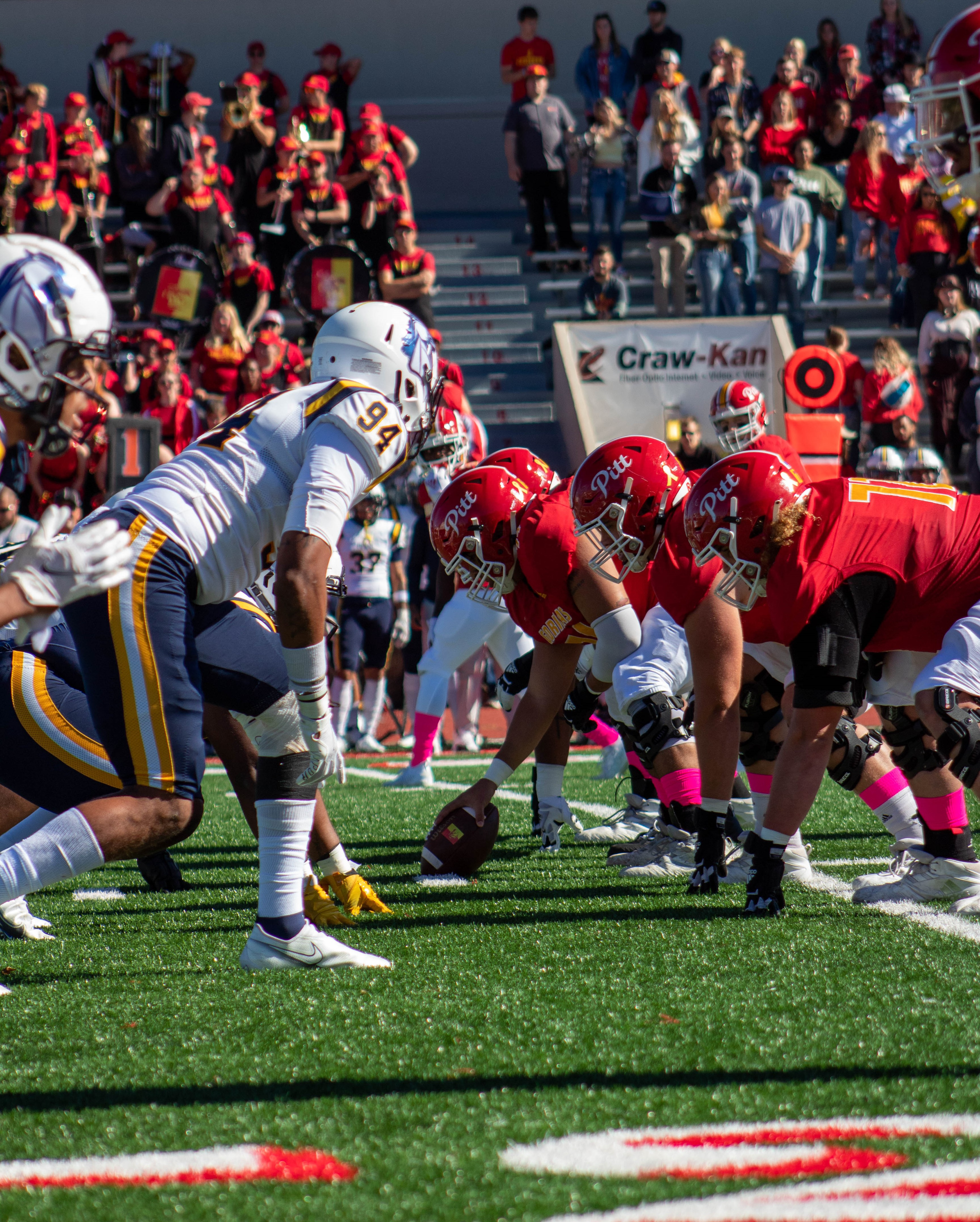
Pittsburg State University vs. the University of Central Oklahoma on October 30, 2021. The Gorillas beat the Bronchos 26–20.

=== Early years ===
The Pittsburg State football program began in 1908 under head coach Albert McLeland. McLeland compiled a record of 2–2–2 in his only season as head coach. John Fuhrer succeeded McLeland and served as Pitt State's football coach from 1909 to 1914 and 1918, compiling a record of 26–22–2.

The program enjoyed several years of success in the 1920s under head coach Garfield Weede. Weede coached the team to a 50–31–6 record from 1919 to 1928 including the school's first undefeated season in 1924. That year, his team was declared Kansas Collegiate Athletic Conference champions. Weede ended his tenure at Pittsburg on a downturn, losing every game of his final season of 1928. His squad only scored in two of seven games and allowed a total of 113 points.

During the 1930s and 1940s, Pittsburg State compiled mediocre records under head coaches Blue Howell (35–30–6) and Charles Morgan (44–43–15).

=== Carnie Smith era (1949–1966) ===
Pittsburg State experienced a turn-around from 1949 to 1966 under head coach Carnie Smith. During Smith's 18-year tenure as head coach, the team compiled a record of 116–52–6 and won two NAIA national championships in 1957 and 1961. The team completed perfect seasons at 11–0 in 1957 and 1961 with victories over Hillsdale College in the Holiday Bowl and Linfield College in the Camellia Bowl. The football stadium was later named after Smith.

=== Lester era (1967–1975) ===
Tom Lester took over as the Gorillas' head coach in 1967, the year Pittsburg State joined the Rocky Mountain Athletic Conference (RMAC). In nine years (1967–1975), Lester's teams compiled a record of 48–38–5 and won only one conference championship, the 1970 RMAC championship. In 1972, Pittsburg State joined the Great Plains Athletic Conference (GPAC), then the Central States Intercollegiate Conference in 1976.

=== Randleman era (1976–1981) ===
From 1976 to 1981, Ron Randleman was Pittsburg State's head football coach. Randelman was credited with turning the football program around, compiling a 36–25–2 record in six seasons. He directed the Gorillas to three Central States Conference championships and a trip to the NAIA national finals in 1981. He received coach of the year honors from his conference and his NAIA district three times. In 1981, he was named NAIA National Coach of the Year and NAIA District Six Coach of the Year. On February 5, 1982, Randleman left Pittsburg State to take over at Sam Houston State.

=== Franchione era (1985–1989) ===
Dennis Franchione, a Pittsburg State alumnus, served as head football coach for five years from 1985 to 1989. During his five seasons with the Gorillas, he led the team to a 53–6–0 record, 37–1–0 in conference, won five conference titles, and was named NAIA National Coach of the Year twice. He tied the school record for victories in a single season three times before breaking it with the 12 victories of his 1989 team. During the 1989 season, the Gorillas moved from the NAIA to the NCAA's Division II and joined the MIAA.

=== Broyles era (1990–2009) ===
In 1990, Chuck Broyles became the head football coach at Pittsburg State. In the programs first season in the NCAA, the Gorillas went 10–0 in the regular season and won two games in the Division II playoffs. In 1991, the team finished 13–1–1 and won the NCAA Division II Football Championship. His teams also played in the Division II championship games in 1992, 1995 and 2004. In 2004, the Gorillas finished 14–1, losing 36–31 to Valdosta State University in the Division II championship game. During his 20 years as Pittsburg State's head coach, Broyles compiled a record of 198–47–2. He retired at the end of the 2009 season. A prominent player during this time was two-time All-American punter Brian Moorman, who played at PSU from 1995 to 1998 and went on to become a Pro Bowl punter for the Buffalo Bills.

=== Beck era (2010–2019) ===
Tim Beck took over as Pittsburg State's head football coach in 2010. In his second year as head coach, the Gorillas compiled a record of 13–1 and returned to the NCAA Division II Championship game for the first time since 2004. The Gorillas defeated Wayne State 35–21 to win the title. He resigned after the 2019 season, and is now the offensive coordinator for the Vanderbilt Commodores. John Brown, a wide receiver during this time, became a stud receiver for the Arizona Cardinals, Baltimore Ravens, and the Buffalo Bills.

=== Wright era (2020–2023) ===
On December 7, 2019, Brian Wright was named the 15th head coach of Pittsburg State. During his four-year stint, Wright compiled a strong 33-8 overall record, establishing the Gorillas as a powerhouse in the Mid-America Intercollegiate Athletics Association (MIAA). Coach Wright Led PSU to back-to-back conference titles in 2021 and 2022, going 23-3 over those two seasons. Wright also won MIAA Coach of the Year award twice during his time at Pittsburg State: first in 2021 for guiding the Gorillas to a perfect 9-0 conference record and an NCAA Division II playoff run, and again in 2022 for securing back-to-back MIAA titles with a dominant 10-2 season. On December 3, 2023, Wright left PSU to become the head coach at Northern Arizona University (NAU). At NAU, Wright has since aimed to rebuild, though his time there falls outside his PSU chapter.

== Championships ==
=== National championship seasons ===
Season	Coach	Selectors	Record	Bowl
1957	Carnie Smith	NAIA Playoff	11–0–0	Won NAIA National Championship
1961	Carnie Smith	NAIA Playoff	11–0–0	Won Camellia Bowl
1991	Chuck Broyles	NCAA Division II Playoff	13–1–1	Won Division II Championship
2011	Tim Beck	NCAA Division II Playoff	13–1–0	Won Division II Championship
National Championships			4	

=== Conference championship seasons ===
- Conference Championships (33)

Year	Conference	Coach	Overall record	Conference record
1919†	Kansas Collegiate Athletic Conference	Garfield Weede	7–2–1	5–0–1
1924	Kansas Collegiate Athletic Conference	Garfield Weede	7–0–1	5–0–1
1935†	Central Intercollegiate Athletic Conference	Blue Howell	6–3	3–1
1941	Central Intercollegiate Athletic Conference	Charles Morgan	5–2–3	3–1
1942	Central Intercollegiate Athletic Conference	Charles Morgan	7–1	5–0
1949†	Central Intercollegiate Athletic Conference	Carnie Smith	8–2–1	5–1
1951†	Central Intercollegiate Athletic Conference	Carnie Smith	7–3	4–1
1955	Central Intercollegiate Athletic Conference	Carnie Smith	7–3	5–0
1957	Central Intercollegiate Athletic Conference	Carnie Smith	11–0	5–0
1961	Central Intercollegiate Athletic Conference	Carnie Smith	11–0	5–0
1966†	Central Intercollegiate Athletic Conference	Carnie Smith	7–2	3–1
1970	Rocky Mountain Athletic Conference	Tom Lester	9–2	4–1
1979†	Central States Intercollegiate Conference	Ron Randleman	8–3	6–1
1981	Central States Intercollegiate Conference	Ron Randleman	10–1	7–0
1982†	Central States Intercollegiate Conference	Bruce Polen	7–2	6–1
1985	Central States Intercollegiate Conference	Dennis Franchione	8–2	6–1
1986	Central States Intercollegiate Conference	Dennis Franchione	11–1	7–0
1987	Central States Intercollegiate Conference	Dennis Franchione	11–1	7–0
1988	Central States Intercollegiate Conference	Dennis Franchione	11–1	7–0
1989	Mid-America Intercollegiate Athletics Association	Dennis Franchione	12–1	7–0
1990	Mid-America Intercollegiate Athletics Association	Chuck Broyles	12–1	9–0
1991	Mid-America Intercollegiate Athletics Association	Chuck Broyles	13–1–1	8–0–1
1992	Mid-America Intercollegiate Athletics Association	Chuck Broyles	14–1	9–0
1994	Mid-America Intercollegiate Athletics Association	Chuck Broyles	10–1	9–0
1995	Mid-America Intercollegiate Athletics Association	Chuck Broyles	12–1–1	9–0
1996†	Mid-America Intercollegiate Athletics Association	Chuck Broyles	8–3	8–1
2001	Mid-America Intercollegiate Athletics Association	Chuck Broyles	11–2	8–1
2003†	Mid-America Intercollegiate Athletics Association	Chuck Broyles	9–3	7–2
2004	Mid-America Intercollegiate Athletics Association	Chuck Broyles	14–1	9–0
2011	Mid-America Intercollegiate Athletics Association	Tim Beck	13–1	8–1
2014†	Mid-America Intercollegiate Athletics Association	Tim Beck	11–2	10–1
2022	Mid-America Intercollegiate Athletics Association	Brian Wright	12–1	11–0
2023†	Mid-America Intercollegiate Athletics Association	Brian Wright	11–2	9–1
Total Conference championships:			33	
† Denotes co-champions

== All-time record vs. current MIAA teams ==
Official record (including any NCAA imposed vacates and forfeits) against all current MIAA opponents as of the end of the 2015 season:

Opponent	Won	Lost	Tied	Percentage	Streak	First meeting
Central Missouri	42	11	2	.782	Won 3	1916
Central Oklahoma	10	4	1	.700	Won 2	1915
Emporia State	60	34	2	.635	Won 2	1915
Fort Hays State	46	20	9	.673	won 2	1925
Missouri Southern	40	10	1	.794	Won 5	1968
Missouri Western	31	12	2	.711	Won 5	1970
Nebraska–Kearney	11	8	0	.579	Won 1	1974
Northeastern State	19	12	2	.606	Won 8	1912
Northwest Missouri State	25	26	0	.490	Won 1	1932
Washburn	63	24	1	.722	Won 2	1920
Totals	350	163	18	.676		

== Carnie Smith Stadium ==
With the success of the football program in the 1990s, Pittsburg State undertook a $5.8 million renovation of Carnie Smith Stadium in 2000, a further $2.5 million renovation to the west end in 2006 (including the addition of eight luxury boxes), and the addition of a $1.7 million Jumbotron in 2008 (the biggest in Division II at the time).

== Northwest Missouri rivalry ==
Pittsburg State's chief rivalry game is with MIAA rival Northwest Missouri State University. The games between the two schools, formerly known as the Fall Classic at Arrowhead, was played at Arrowhead Stadium in Kansas City, Missouri from 2002 to 2013. The Gorillas went just 3–9 during the series, but four times the winner of the Classic went on to win the NCAA championship. After the 2013 game, Pittsburg State officials decided to move the game back to campus as a nod to the community with the city of Pittsburg contributing $5 million toward a $13 million indoor events center to be completed on the University's campus by spring 2015. The 2002 game had an attendance of 26,695 — the most of any Division II game.

== See also ==
- List of NCAA football teams by wins
