= Carnie Smith Stadium =

Football stadium in Pittsburg, Kansas, US

Coordinates: 37.39124°N 94.699601°W

- "The Jungle"
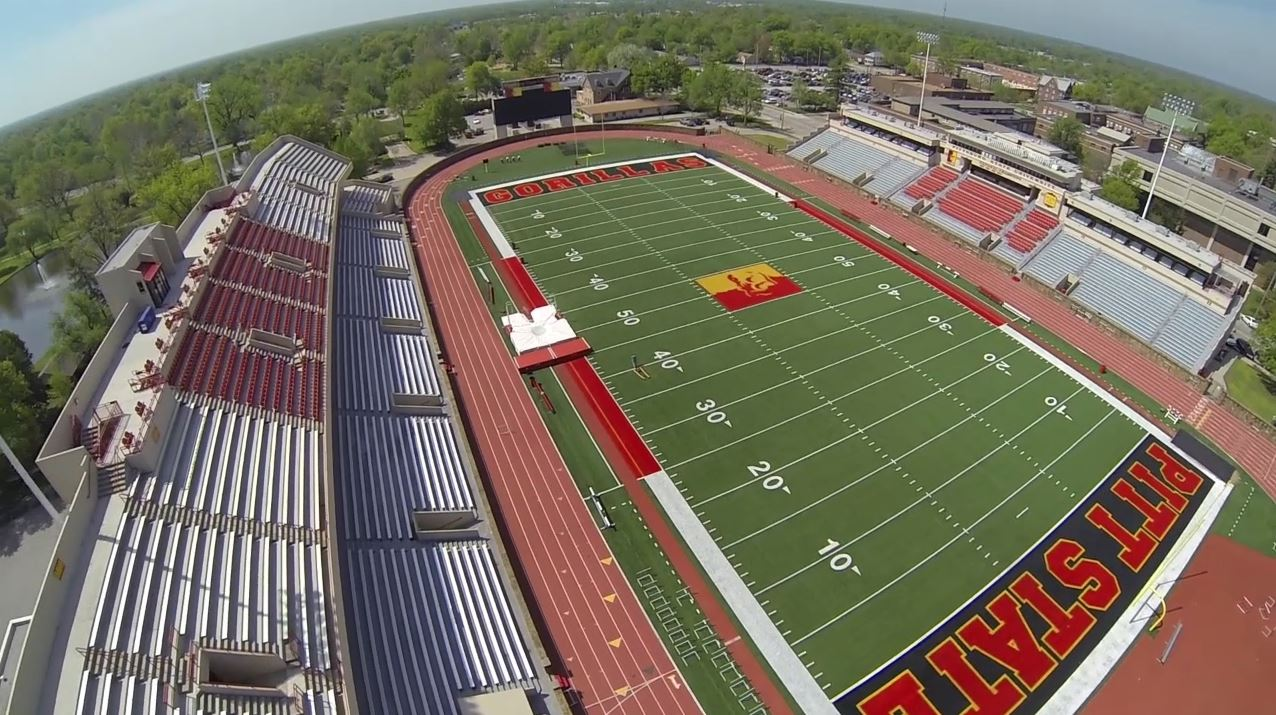
- Aerial view of Carnie Smith Stadium
- Interactive map of Carnie Smith Stadium
- Full name: Carnie Smith Stadium, Brandenburg Field, Prentice Gudgen Track
- Former names: Brandenburg Stadium (1924–1986)
- Location: Pittsburg, Kansas
- Owner: Pittsburg State University
- Operator: Pittsburg State University
- Capacity: 8,343 (standing room to at least 11,910)
- Executive suites: 24
- Surface: Mondoturf installed July 2012
- Scoreboard: Jungletron at a cost of 1.7 million dollars
- Record attendance: 11,910 (October 20, 2012; Homecoming)

Construction
- Built: 1923
- Opened: 1924
- Renovated: 1989
- Expanded: 2001, 2006
- Cost: $100,000

Tenant
- Pittsburg State University Gorillas (NCAA Division II) 1924-Present

Carnie Smith Stadium (formerly Brandenburg Stadium) is the football stadium for Pittsburg State University in Pittsburg, Kansas. The stadium is nicknamed "The Jungle" (after the school's mascot, the gorilla), or "The Pitt."

== History ==
Built in 1923, the stadium was originally named for the college's third leader and first president, William Aaron Brandenburg. In 1987, it was renamed for Carnie Smith who led the school to NAIA National Football Championships in 1957 and 1961. The playing surface is still named Brandenburg Field. The school extensively renovated the stadium in 2000 ($5.8 million overhaul), in 2006 ($2.5 million renovation to the west end, including the addition of eight luxury boxes, and in 2008 ($1.7 million addition of a video board, the largest in NCAA Division II).

Unlike most Division II stadiums, there is an auxiliary game clock installed in the north end zone, meaning teams driving in that direction no longer need to turn around to the main scoreboard in the south end.

== Attendance ==
Average attendance at football games in the stadium since 2000 has been around 7,800. A 2001 game against Northwest Missouri State University drew a then record attendance of 11,862, prompting Pittsburg State to play future games at Arrowhead Stadium in Kansas City with more than 26,000 attending a game in 2002, a Division II record.

During the 2012 football season, the Gorillas packed more than 10,000 or more fans into Carnie Smith Stadium three times, including a season-high 11,910 fans for Homecoming on Oct. 20 – the largest home crowd in school history. The stadium averaged 10,055 fans per game (126% capacity) during the 2012 season.

== Other uses ==
The stadium has been the home to numerous Kansas State High School Activities Association state championship games, home games for Pittsburg High School and St. Mary's Colgan High School, and is currently in the rotation for the Kansas Shrine Bowl all-star game with Emporia, Wichita and Hays. From 2018-2020, it is also the host site for the National Junior College National Football Championship.
