= List of sports venues in North Carolina =

The following is a list of sports venues in the U.S. State of North Carolina. Venues are separated into three categories: Arenas, race tracks, and stadiums. Each category may be sorted by venue name, location, tenant or usage, or capacity.

== Current ==
=== Arenas ===
Venue	City/Town	Tenant/Use	Capacity	Miscellaneous
Greensboro Coliseum	Greensboro	UNCG Spartans	23,500	Frequently hosts Atlantic Coast Conference basketball tournaments.
Dean Smith Center	Chapel Hill	North Carolina Tar Heels, Men's	21,750	
Lenovo Center	Raleigh	Carolina Hurricanes, NC State Wolfpack men's basketball	21,000	
Spectrum Center	Charlotte	Charlotte Hornets	20,200	
LJVM Coliseum	Winston-Salem	Wake Forest Demon Deacons	14,665	
Cameron Indoor Stadium	Durham	Duke Blue Devils	9,314	
Halton Arena	Charlotte	Charlotte 49ers	9,105	
Bojangles' Coliseum	Charlotte	Charlotte Checkers	8,600	
Crown Coliseum	Fayetteville	Fayetteville Marksmen, Fayetteville Force	8,500	
Holmes Center	Boone	Appalachian State Mountaineers	8,325	
Minges Coliseum	Greenville	East Carolina Pirates	8,500	
Carmichael Arena	Chapel Hill	North Carolina Tar Heels women's basketball	8,010	
Ramsey Center	Cullowhee	Western Carolina Catamounts	7,826	
Harrah's Cherokee Center	Asheville	General	7,654	Currently hosts the Southern Conference men's and women's basketball tournaments.
Dorton Arena	Raleigh	Carolina Rollergirls	7,610	State Fairgrounds arena
John M. Belk Arena	Davidson	Davidson Wildcats	6,000	
Corbett Sports Center	Greensboro	NC A&T Aggies	5,700	
Reynolds Coliseum	Raleigh	NC State Wolfpack women's basketball	5,500	
Schar Center	Elon	Elon Phoenix	5,100	
Cabarrus Arena	Concord	General	5,000	County fairgrounds arena
Paul Porter Arena	Boiling Springs	Gardner–Webb Runnin' Bulldogs	5,000	
R.L. Vaughn Center	Elizabeth City	ECSU Vikings	5,000	
Trask Coliseum	Wilmington	UNCW Seahawks	5,000	
Qubein Center	High Point	High Point Panthers	4,500	
LJVM Coliseum Annex	Winston-Salem	Carolina Thunderbirds	4,000	
Grady Cole Center	Charlotte	General	3,900	
C. E. Gaines Center	Winston-Salem	WS State Rams	3,200	
Kimmel Arena	Asheville	UNC Asheville Bulldogs	3,200	
Pope Convocation Center	Buies Creek	Campbell Fighting Camels	3,100	
McLendon–McDougald Gymnasium	Durham	NC Central Eagles	3,056	
Ragan-Brown Field House	Greensboro	Guilford Quakers	2,500	
Fleming Gymnasium	Greensboro	UNCG Spartans	2,320	
Greensboro Coliseum Fieldhouse	Greensboro	Greensboro Swarm	2,118	A separate arena/meeting hall within the Greensboro Coliseum Complex.
Millis Athletic Convocation Center	High Point	High Point Panthers	1,750	
Reynolds Gymnasium	Winston-Salem	Wake Forest Demon Deacons	1,500	
Riddle Center	Fayetteville	Methodist Monarchs	1,300	

=== Race tracks ===
Venue	City/Town	Tenant/Use	Capacity	Miscellaneous
Charlotte Motor Speedway	Concord	Oval racing, Road racing	94,000-170,000	
North Wilkesboro Speedway	North Wilkesboro	Oval racing	40,000	
Rockingham Speedway	Rockingham	Oval racing, Road racing	34,500	
zMax Dragway	Concord	Drag racing	30,000	
Rockingham Dragway	Rockingham	Drag racing	30,000	
Bowman Gray Stadium	Winston-Salem	Oval racing	17,000	
Dirt Track @ Charlotte	Concord	Dirt racing	14,000	
Hickory Motor Speedway	Newton	Oval racing	13,200	
Orange County Speedway	Rougemont	Oval racing	12,400	
Concord Motorsport Park	Midland	Oval racing	8,500	
Ace Speedway	Altamahaw	Oval racing	5,000	
Caraway Speedway	Sophia	Oval racing	4,000	

=== Stadiums ===
Venue	City/Town	Tenant/Use	Capacity	Sports
Bank of America Stadium	Charlotte	Carolina Panthers	73,778	Football, soccer
Carter–Finley Stadium	Raleigh	NC State Wolfpack	57,583	Football
Dowdy–Ficklen Stadium	Greenville	East Carolina Pirates	51,000	Football
Kenan Memorial Stadium	Chapel Hill	North Carolina Tar Heels	50,500	Football
Wallace Wade Stadium	Durham	Duke Blue Devils	40,004	Football
Allegacy Federal Credit Union Stadium	Winston-Salem	Wake Forest Demon Deacons	31,500	Football
Kidd Brewer Stadium	Boone	Appalachian State Mountaineers	30,000	Football
Truist Stadium	Greensboro	NC A&T Aggies	22,000	Football, track and field
Bowman Gray Stadium	Winston-Salem	WS State Rams	17,000	Football, auto racing
Jerry Richardson Stadium	Charlotte	Charlotte 49ers	15,314	Football
Whitmire Stadium	Cullowhee	Western Carolina Catamounts	13,742	Football
O'Kelly-Riddick Stadium	Durham	NC Central Eagles	11,500	Football
Rhodes Stadium	Elon	Elon Phoenix	11,250	Football, soccer
American Legion Memorial Stadium	Charlotte	Carolina Ascent FC, Charlotte Independence, High schools	10,500	Football, soccer, lacrosse
Truist Field	Charlotte	Charlotte Knights	10,200	Baseball
Durham Bulls Athletic Park	Durham	Durham Bulls	10,000	Baseball
Jamieson Stadium	Greensboro	Greensboro Pride, High schools	10,000	Football, soccer
Simeon Stadium	High Point	High schools	10,000	Football, soccer
First Horizon Stadium at WakeMed Soccer Park	Cary	North Carolina FC; North Carolina Courage	10,000	Soccer
Spangler Stadium	Boiling Springs	Gardner–Webb Runnin' Bulldogs	9,000	Football, track and field
Moretz Stadium	Hickory	Lenoir-Rhyne Bears	8,500	Football, lacrosse
Durham County Stadium	Durham	Shaw Bears	8,000	Football, soccer, track and field
World War Memorial Stadium	Greensboro	NC A&T Aggies	7,500	Baseball
First National Bank Field	Greensboro	Greensboro Grasshoppers	7,499	Baseball
Brevard Memorial Stadium	Brevard	Brevard Tornados	7,000	Football, track and field
Five County Stadium	Zebulon	Carolina Mudcats	6,500	Baseball
Alumni Memorial Stadium	Salisbury	Livingstone Blue Bears	6,000	Football, track and field
Richardson Stadium	Davidson	Davidson Wildcats	6,000	Football, track and field
Legion Stadium	Wilmington	Wilmington Hammerheads	6,000	Soccer
Truist Stadium	Winston-Salem	Winston-Salem Dash	5,500	Baseball
L. P. Frans Stadium	Hickory	Hickory Crawdads	5,092	Baseball
Fetzer Field	Chapel Hill	North Carolina Tar Heels	5,025	Soccer, lacrosse, track and field
Barker–Lane Stadium	Buies Creek	Campbell Fighting Camels	5,000	Football
Garrison Stadium	Murfreesboro	Chowan Hawks	5,000	Football
Roebuck Stadium	Elizabeth City	Elizabeth City State Vikings	5,000	Football, soccer, track and field
Segra Stadium	Fayetteville	Fayetteville Woodpeckers	4,786	Baseball
Grainger Stadium	Kinston	Down East Wood Ducks	4,100	Baseball
Transamerica Field	Charlotte	Charlotte 49ers	4,000	Track and field
Johnson Stadium	Pembroke	UNC Pembroke Braves	4,000	Football, track and field
Brooks Field	Wilmington	UNC Wilmington Seahawks	3,000	Baseball
Fleming Stadium	Wilson	Wilson Tobs	3,000	Baseball
Irwin Belk Stadium	Wingate	Wingate Bulldogs	3,000	Football
Sportsplex at Matthews	Matthews	Charlotte Independence	2,300	Soccer
Finch Field	Thomasville	High Point-Thomasville Hi-Toms	2,000	Baseball
Ting Stadium	Holly Springs	Holly Springs Salamanders	1,800	Baseball
Jim Perry Stadium	Buies Creek	Campbell Fighting Camels; Buies Creek Astros	1,000	Baseball
