= 2010 Incarnate Word Cardinals football team =

American college football season

2010 Incarnate Word Cardinals football
- Conference: Lone Star Conference
- South
- Record: 3–8 (3–7 Lone Star)
- Head coach: Mike Santiago (2nd season)
- Offensive coordinator: Tony Marciano (1st season)
- Offensive scheme: Multiple
- Defensive coordinator: Todd Ivicic (2nd season)
- Base defense: 4–2–5
- Home stadium: Gayle and Tom Benson Stadium

2010 Lone Star Conference football standings
| | Conf. | | | Overall |
| Team | W | | L | W | | L |
|---|---|---|---|---|---|---|
Overall*
| No. 8 Abilene Christian $^ | 10 | – | 0 | 11 | – | 1 |
| No. 9 Texas A&M–Kingsville ^ | 9 | – | 1 | 10 | – | 2 |
| No. 18 W. Texas A&M ^ | 8 | – | 2 | 8 | – | 4 |
| Midwestern State # | 7 | – | 3 | 8 | – | 4 |
| Northeastern State | 6 | – | 4 | 6 | – | 5 |
| East Central | 5 | – | 5 | 5 | – | 6 |
| Angelo State | 5 | – | 5 | 5 | – | 5 |
| SW Oklahoma State | 4 | – | 6 | 4 | – | 7 |
| Eastern New Mexico † | 4 | – | 6 | 5 | – | 6 |
| SE Oklahoma State | 3 | – | 7 | 3 | – | 8 |
| Tarleton State | 3 | – | 7 | 3 | – | 8 |
| Incarnate Word | 3 | – | 7 | 3 | – | 8 |
| Central Oklahoma | 2 | – | 8 | 2 | – | 9 |
| Texas A&M–Commerce | 2 | – | 8 | 3 | – | 8 |
North Division
| Northeastern State x | 5 | – | 1 | 6 | – | 5 |
| East Central x | 5 | – | 1 | 5 | – | 6 |
| SW Oklahoma State | 4 | – | 2 | 4 | – | 7 |
| Eastern New Mexico † | 3 | – | 3 | 5 | – | 6 |
| SE Oklahoma State | 2 | – | 4 | 3 | – | 8 |
| Central Oklahoma | 1 | – | 5 | 2 | – | 9 |
| Texas A&M–Commerce | 1 | – | 5 | 3 | – | 8 |
South Division
| No. 8 Abilene Christian x$^ | 6 | – | 0 | 11 | – | 1 |
| No. 9 Texas A&M–Kingsville ^ | 5 | – | 1 | 10 | – | 2 |
| No. 18 W. Texas A&M ^ | 4 | – | 2 | 8 | – | 4 |
| Midwestern State # | 3 | – | 3 | 8 | – | 4 |
| Tarleton State | 2 | – | 4 | 3 | – | 8 |
| Angelo State | 1 | – | 5 | 5 | – | 5 |
| Incarnate Word | 0 | – | 6 | 3 | – | 8 |
$ – Conference champion; ^ – NCAA Division II playoff participant; * – The LSC counted separate overall and division standings. † – Eastern New Mexico vacated all five wins. # – Kanza Bowl participant; Rankings from AFCA Poll

The 2010 Incarnate Word Cardinals football team represented the University of the Incarnate Word in the 2010 NCAA Division II football season. Home games were played at Gayle and Tom Benson Stadium. They finished the season 3–8, 2–6 in Lone Star play to finish in a tie for ninth place.

== Schedule ==
| Date | Time | Opponent | Site | Result | Attendance |
|---|---|---|---|---|---|
| August 28 | 7:00 p.m. | Langston* | Gayle and Tom Benson Stadium; San Antonio, TX | L 20–28 | 3,726 |
| September 11 | 6:00 p.m. | at Southeastern Oklahoma | Paul Laird Field; Durant, OK | L 19–38 | 2,576 |
| September 18 | 7:00 p.m. | Central Oklahoma | Gayle and Tom Benson Stadium; San Antonio, TX | W 42–41 ^{OT} | 2,117 |
| September 25 | 7:00 p.m. | No. 5 Texas A&M–Kingsville | Gayle and Tom Benson Stadium; San Antonio, TX | L 9–37 | 5,412 |
| October 2 | 7:00 p.m. | at No. 10 Midwestern State | Memorial Stadium; Wichita Falls, TX | L 31–38 ^{OT} | 8,127 |
| October 9 | 6:00 p.m. | at East Central | Norris Field; Ada, OK | W 27–13 | 3,000 |
| October 16 | 7:00 p.m. | No. 3 Abilene Christian | Gayle and Tom Benson Stadium; San Antonio, TX | L 17–54 | 3,325 |
| October 23 | 6:00 p.m. | at Angelo State | San Angelo Stadium; San Angelo, TX | L 17–61 | 4,628 |
| October 30 | 2:00 p.m. | No. 11 West Texas A&M^{†} | Gayle and Tom Benson Stadium; San Antonio, TX | L 10–49 | 2,679 |
| November 6 | 7:00 p.m. | at Tarleton State | Memorial Stadium; Stephenville, TX | L 27–41 | 4,960 |
| November 13 | 2:00 p.m. | Texas A&M–Commerce | Gayle and Tom Benson Stadium; San Antonio, TX | W 17–16 | 1,275 |
*Non-conference game; ^{†}Homecoming; Rankings from AFCA Poll released prior to the game; All times are in Central time

== Personnel ==
=== Coaching staff ===
| Name | Position | Alma Mater | Joined Staff |
| Mike Santiago | Head coach / Quarterbacks | Southern Utah (1977) | 2007 |
| Todd Ivicic | Defensive Coordinator / Linebackers / Special Teams | Sam Houston State (1991) | 2007 |
| Tony Marciano | Offensive Coordinator / Offensive Line | IUP (1978) | 2010 |
| Kyle Kennan | Director of Football Operations / Wide Receivers | Roger Williams (2001) | 2007 |
| Nick Debose | Defensive Backs | Southeastern Oklahoma (2006) | 2008 |
| Brian Gamble | Defensive Line | Texas A&M (2002) | 2008 |
| Caesar Martinez | Strength and Conditioning Coach | Texas Tech | 2008 |
| Brendon Saul | Graduate Assistant / Cornerbacks | Texas State | 2009 |
| Michael Briglin | Graduate Assistant / Running Backs | Oswego State | 2010 |
| T.R. St. Charles | Head Football Athletic Trainer | Vanderbilt (1976) | 2008 |

=== Roster ===
2010 Incarnate Word Cardinals Football
| Quarterback: 2 Eric Massoni – (redshirt) Sophomore (6'2, 215); 9 Shane Knight – (redshirt) Freshman (6'0, 180); 10 Paden Lynch – (redshirt) Sophomore (6'5, 205); 17 Thomas Specia – (redshirt) Senior (6'3, 210); Running Back: 4 Al Furlow – Senior (5'11, 210); 22 Trent Rios – (redshirt) Sophomore (5'8, 175); 29 Brenan Furtado – Freshman (5'10, 170); 34 Josh Eatman – Freshman (5'9, 180); 30 Alex Torres – (redshirt) Sophomore (6'0, 195); 34 Josh Eatman – Freshman (5'9, 180); 36 Tahje Canyon – Freshman (5’10, 185); 47 Holden Rios – (redshirt) Freshman (6'0, 175); Fullback: 39 Patrick Martinez – (redshirt) Sophomore (6'0, 255); 42 Josh Lemos – Freshman (5'11, 220); 43 Donald Gies – (redshirt) Sophomore (6'0, 200); 46 Sam Giamfortone – Freshman (6'0, 220); Wide Receiver: 3 Dominic Hamilton – (redshirt) Sophomore (5'9, 175); 5 Colton Palmer – (redshirt) Freshman (6'4, 195); 6 Derrick Walls – Sophomore (5'8, 160); 11 Austin Quinney – (redshirt) Sophomore (5'11, 190); 12 Stan Sullivan – Freshman (5'11, 175); 13 Mike Woods – (redshirt) Junior (6'1, 172); 82 Jacob Love – (redshirt) Junior (5'7, 165); 83 Kenneth Pryor – (redshirt) Junior (6'0, 170); 86 Carlos Laurel – (redshirt) Freshman (6'1, 175); 87 Andrew Richter – (redshirt) Freshman (5'11, 170) | Tight End: 80 Andrew Mocio – (redshirt) Sophomore (6'5, 215); 81 Robert Anderson – Sophomore (6'1, 210); 84 Brett Bippert – Freshman (6'2, 215); 85 Devin Judkins – Freshman (6'4, 220); 88 Caleb Kocian – (redshirt) Sophomore (6'3, 240); Offensive Line: 50 Dominique Johnson – OG – Freshman (6'2, 265); 57 Jake Roby – OT – (redshirt) Sophomore (6'6, 260); 60 Manny Tijerina – OG – Junior (6'2, 300); 61 Andy Seaman – C – Sophomore (6'2, 270); 64 John Gallegos – C – (redshirt) Freshman (6'0, 285); 67 Charles Segura – OG – (redshirt) Junior (6'2, 295); 68 Michael Palacios – OG – (redshirt) Sophomore (6'5, 340); 69 Mathew Atwell – OT – (redshirt) Junior (6'4, 270); 74 Eric Salas – OG – (redshirt) Freshman (6'1, 275); 75 Ty Warnasch – OG – (redshirt) Sophomore (6'3, 300); 76 Jayson Hierholzer – OT – (redshirt) Sophomore (6'4, 285); 77 Chet Dillenbeck – OT – Freshman (6'4, 290); 79 Tim Kudla – OT – (redshirt) Junior (6'4, 265); Defensive Line: 52 Alan Ford – DE – (redshirt) Sophomore (6'5, 210); 53 Chase Curry – DE – Freshman (6'2, 220); 55 Brandon Terry – DT – (redshirt) Freshman (5'10, 270); 56 Jeremy Carson – DE – Freshman (6'0, 250); 58 Brandon Fraser – DE – Senior (6'3, 240); 63 Joseph Roberson – DT – (redshirt) Freshman (6'0, 265); 65 Anthony Vela – DT – Sophomore (6'0, 270); 70 Steve Burgamy – DT – (redshirt) Junior (5'11, 260); 72 Robby Horton – DT – (redshirt) Freshman (6'2, 265); 78 Michael Tate – DT – Freshman (5'11, 290); 90 Evan Newland – DE – Freshman (6'1, 255); 91 Herman Torres – DE – (redshirt) Senior (6'0, 248); 92 Chaz Cobb – DE – (redshirt) Freshman (6'1, 210); 93 Randy Enriquez – DE – (redshirt) Senior (6'0, 255); 94 Hakim Blackwell – DE – Junior (6'2, 225); 95 Marcus McKenzie – DT – (redshirt) Sophomore (6'0, 270); 98 Diego McClain – DT – (redshirt) Junior (6'2, 260) | Linebacker: 32 Matt Bass – Freshman (5'11, 225); 33 Dakota Mawyer – (redshirt) Sophomore (6'3, 250); 35 Tyler Fields – (redshirt) Sophomore (6'0, 235); 40 Rashaad Patterson – Sophomore (5'10, 210); 45 Jordan Spice – Freshman (5'9, 210); 48 Juan Ascencio – Freshman (5'11, 210); 51 Daniel Soto – (redshirt) Graduate Senior (6'1, 233); 59 Andrew Gurrola – Freshman (6'0, 195); Defensive Back: 1 Robert Williams – CB – (redshirt) Sophomore (5'8, 155); 7 Chaz Pavliska – S – (redshirt) Sophomore (5'11, 210); 16 Mat Garza – CB – Sophomore (5'8, 150); 18 Glenn Hill – S – Freshman (6'1, 185); 19 James Perez – CB – (redshirt) Sophomore (5'11, 155); 20 Troy Smith – CB – Freshman (5'10, 175); 21 Devin Haywood – S – Freshman (5'10, 170); 23 Aaron Hernandez – S – (redshirt) Junior (6'0, 185); 24 Anthony Stokes – S – Sophomore (5'11, 190); 25 Devan Avery – CB – (redshirt) Sophomore (5'10, 160); 26 Todd Lyons – S – Sophomore (5'11, 195); 27 Aaron Willis – S – (redshirt) Sophomore (6'3, 210); 28 Ephraim Banda – S – (redshirt) Senior (5'9, 190); 31 Aaron Stokes – S – (redshirt) Freshman (5'11, 190); 38 Sonny Estrada – S – Junior (6'0, 195); 41 Evan Morris – CB – Freshman (5'10, 165); 47 Mark Anthony – DB – Freshman (5'9, 175); Special Teams: 15 Saul Meza – K – (redshirt) Sophomore (5'9, 160); 49 Thomas Rebold – K/P – (redshirt) Junior (5'10, 175); 99 Sam McMillan – P – Freshman (5'9, 160) |

== Depth chart ==
Defense

S
27 Aaron Willis, So
23 Aaron Hernandez, Jr
38 Sonny Estrada, Jr

FS
26 Todd Lyons, So
21 Devin Haywood, Fr
31 Aaron Stokes, Fr

| WLB | SLB |
|---|---|
| 48 Juan Asencio, Fr | 33 Dakota Mawyer, So |
| 35 Tyler Fields, So | 32 Matt Bass, Fr |
| 40 Rashaad Patterson, So | 51 Daniel Soto, Sr |

SS
7 Chaz Pavliska, So
18 Glenn Hill, Fr
24 Anthony Stokes, So

CB
25 Devan Avery, So
1 Robert Williams, So
47 Mark Anthony, Fr

| DE | DT | DT | DE |
|---|---|---|---|
| 52 Alan Ford, So | 98 Diego McClain, Jr | 65 Anthony Vela, So | 93 Randy Enriquez, Sr |
| 56 Jeremy Carson, Fr | 72 Robby Horton, Fr | 78 Michael Tate, Fr | 91 Herman Torres, Sr |
| 94 Hakim Blackwell, Jr | 55 Brandon Terry, Fr | 70 Steve Burgamy, Jr | 90 Evan Newland, Fr |

CB
19 James Perez, So
16 Mat Garza, So
13 Mike Woods, So

Offense

WR
3 Dominic Hamilton, So
12 Stan Sullivan, Fr
83 Kenneth Pryor, Jr

| LT | LG | C | RG | RT |
|---|---|---|---|---|
| 57 Jake Roby, So | 75 Ty Warnasch, So | 61 Andy Seaman, So | 67 Charles Segura, Jr | 76 Jayson Hierholzer, So |
| 69 Matt Atwell, Jr | 68 Michael Palacios, So | 64 John Gallegos, So | 60 Manny Tijerina, Jr | 79 Tim Kudla, Jr |
| ⋅ | 50 Dominique Johnson, Fr | ⋅ | 74 Eric Salas, Fr | 77 Chet Dillenbeck, Fr |

TE
80 Andrew Mocio, So
88 Caleb Kocian, So
81 Robert Anderson, So

WR
82 Jacob Love, Jr
5 Colton Palmer, Fr
11 Austin Quinney, So

QB
10 Paden Lynch, So
17 Thomas Specia, Sr
2 Eric Massoni, So

RB
22 Trent Rios, So
36 Tahje Canyon, Fr
4 Al Furlow, Sr

FB
43 Donald Gies, Jr
39 Patrick Martinez, So
46 Sam Giamfortone, Fr

Special teams
PK 49 Thomas Rebold, Jr
PK 15 Saul Meza, So
P 27 Aaron Willis, So
KR 22 Trent Rios, So
PR 6 Derrick Walls, So
LS 70 Steve Burgamy, Jr
H 3 Dominic Hamilton, So
