= Tracy Holland =

American football coach

Playing career
- 1973–1977: Northern Colorado
- Position: Defensive back

Coaching career (HC unless noted)
- 1989–1992: Northern Colorado (assistant)
- 1993–1995: Frankfurt Knights
- 1999–2001: Heritage Hall HS (OK) (assistant)
- 2002–2004: Heritage Hall HS (OK)
- 2005–2007: Oklahoma Christian School (OK)
- 2008–2011: Central Oklahoma

Head coaching record
- Overall: 15–29 (college)

Accomplishments and honors

Championships
- 1 LSC North Division (2008)

Tracy Holland is a former American football coach. He served as the head football coach at the University of Central Oklahoma from 2008 to 2011, compiling a career college football record of 15–29.

== Early life ==
Holland attended John F. Kennedy High School in Denver Colorado, where he played football as a defensive back. He attended the University of Northern Colorado in Greeley, Colorado and played for the school's football program from 1973-1977.

== Early coaching ==
Holland began his coaching career in 1989 as an assistant coach at Northern Colorado. He assisted Joe Glenn for four seasons and helped the Bears to two NCAA Division II playoff appearances. From 1993 to 1995; he coached the Frankfurt Knights in the Football League of Europe. In 1999, Holland moved to Oklahoma City and became an assistant at Heritage Hall School and later became the schools head coach in 2002. He later became the coach at Oklahoma Christian School in Edmond, Oklahoma.

== Central Oklahoma ==
In December 2007, Holland became the head football coach at the University of Central Oklahoma in Edmond, Oklahoma. The football program was placed on NCAA probation as a result of recruiting violations during the tenure of previous head coach Chuck Langston. During his first season as the head coach of the Bronchos, UCO went 7–4, and won the Lone Star Conference north division championship. After a 4–7 campaign in 2009, and 2-9 records in 2010, and 2011, UCO dismissed Holland as head coach. He returned to private business.

== Head coaching record ==
=== College ===
Year	Team	Overall	Conference	Standing
Central Oklahoma Bronchos (Lone Star Conference) (2008–2010)
2008	Central Oklahoma	7–4	6–3	7th / 1st (North)
2009	Central Oklahoma	4–7	4–5	9th / 3rd (North)
2010	Central Oklahoma	2–9	2–8	T–13th / 7th (North)
Central Oklahoma Bronchos (NCAA Division II independent) (2011)
2011	Central Oklahoma	2–9		
Central Oklahoma:		15–29	12–16	
Total:		15–29		
National championship Conference title Conference division title or championship game berth
