= 2011 North Greenville Crusaders football team =

American college football season

2011 North Greenville Crusaders football

NCAA Division II Quarterfinal, L 23–28 vs. Delta State
- Conference: Independent

Ranking
- AFCA: No. 12
- Record: 11–3
- Head coach: Jamey Chadwell (3rd season)
- Defensive coordinator: Chad Staggs (3rd season)
- Home stadium: Younts Stadium

2011 NCAA Division II independents football records
| | Conf. | | | Overall |
| Team | W | | L | W | | L |
|---|---|---|---|---|---|---|
| No. 12 North Greenville ^ | | – | | 11 | – | 3 |
| UNC Pembroke | | – | | 8 | – | 3 |
| Northeastern State | | – | | 7 | – | 5 |
| Southwest Baptist | | – | | 6 | – | 5 |
| Notre Dame (OH) | | – | | 5 | – | 6 |
| OK Panhandle State | | – | | 3 | – | 7 |
| Central Oklahoma | | – | | 2 | – | 9 |
| Central State | | – | | 1 | – | 10 |
^ – NCAA Division II playoff participant; Rankings from AFCA Poll

The 2011 North Greenville Crusaders football team represented North Greenville University as an independent during the 2011 NCAA Division II football season. Led by Jamey Chadwell in his third and final season as head coach, the team compiled a record of 11–3. North Greenville advanced to the NCAA Division II Football Championship playoffs, where they beat Albany State in the first round and Mars Hill in the second round before falling to Delta State in the quarterfinals. The Crusaders scored 561 points and allowed 268 points.

== Schedule ==
| Date | Time | Opponent | Rank | Site | Result | Attendance |
|---|---|---|---|---|---|---|
| September 3 | | at Newberry | | Setzler Field; Newberry, SC | W 46–17 | 2,662 |
| September 10 | 1:30 pm | at Presbyterian | | Bailey Memorial Stadium; Clinton, SC | L 21–38 | 4,012 |
| September 17 | | Tusculum | | Younts Stadium; Tigerville, SC | W 27–7 | 4,618 |
| September 24 | | at Mars Hill | | Meares Stadium; Mars Hill, NC | L 28–38 | 3,211 |
| October 1 | | Lenoir–Rhyne | | Younts Stadium; Tigerville, SC | W 35–27 | 3,700 |
| October 8 | | at Central State (OH) | | McPherson Stadium; Wilberforce, OH | W 49–20 | 1,146 |
| October 15 | | Carson–Newman | | Younts Stadium; Tigerville, SC | W 34–27 | 3,259 |
| October 22 | | at Brevard | | Brevard Memorial Stadium; Brevard, NC | W 36–6 | 2,715 |
| October 29 | | Catawba^{†} | | Younts Stadium; Tigerville, SC | W 25-7 | 3,260 |
| November 5 | | at Wingate | | Irwin Belk Stadium; Wingate, NC | W 54–7 | 3,682 |
| November 12 | | Notre Dame (OH) | | Younts Stadium; Tigerville, SC | W 62–0 | 3,582 |
| November 19 | | Albany State | No. 20 | Younts Stadium; Tigerville, SC (NCAA Division II First Round) | W 63–14 | 3,374 |
| November 26 | | at No. 19 Mars Hill | No. 20 | Meares Stadium; Mars Hill, NC (NCAA Division II Second Round) | W 58–32 | 2,275 |
| December 3 | | at No. 8 Delta State | No. 20 | McCool Stadium; Cleveland, MS (NCAA Division II Quarterfinal) | L 23–28 | 6,591 |
^{†}Homecoming; Rankings from AFCA Poll released prior to the game; All times are in Eastern time
