= 2011 Lenoir–Rhyne Bears football team =

American college football season

2011 Lenoir–Rhyne Bears football

SAC co-champion
- Conference: South Atlantic Conference
- Record: 7–3 (6–1 SAC)
- Head coach: Mike Houston (1st season)
- Offensive coordinator: Brent Thompson (2nd season)
- Home stadium: Moretz Stadium

2011 South Atlantic Conference football standings
	Conf.			Overall
Team	W		L	W		L
No. 19 Mars Hill +^	6	–	1	8	–	3
Lenoir–Rhyne +	6	–	1	7	–	3
Wingate	4	–	3	5	–	6
Newberry	4	–	3	4	–	6
Carson–Newman	3	–	4	5	–	6
Catawba	2	–	5	3	–	8
Tusculum	2	–	5	3	–	8
Brevard	1	–	6	3	–	8
+ – Conference co-champions; ^ – NCAA Division II playoff participant; Rankings from AFCA poll

The 2011 Lenoir–Rhyne Bears football team represented Lenoir–Rhyne University in the 2011 NCAA Division II football season. The Bears offense scored 336 points while the defense allowed 226 points.

== Schedule ==
Date	Time	Opponent	Site	Result	Attendance
September 3		at Concord*	Callaghan Stadium; Athens, WV	W 26-6	1,910
September 10	7:00 pm	at Davidson*	Richardson Stadium; Davidson, NC	L 10-28	4,742
September 17		Carson–Newman	Moretz Stadium; Hickory, NC	W 20-7	7,131
October 1		at North Greenville*	Younts Stadium; Tigerville, SC	L 27-35	3,700
October 8		Brevard^{†}	Moretz Stadium; Hickory, NC	W 33-27 ^{3OT}	8,047
October 15		at Tusculum	Pioneer Field; Tusculum, TN	L 25-26	1,492
October 22		at Mars Hill	Meares Stadium; Mars Hill, NC	W 51-21	2,290
October 29		Wingate	Moretz Stadium; Hickory, NC	W 52-28	5,976
November 5		Newberry	Moretz Stadium; Hickory, NC	W 54-42	7,746
November 12		at Catawba	Shuford Stadium; Salisbury, NC	W 38-6	2,548
*Non-conference game; ^{†}Homecoming; All times are in Eastern time
