= 2010 Abilene Christian Wildcats football team =

American college football season

2010 Abilene Christian Wildcats football

LSC champion LSC South Division champion

NCAA Division II Second Round, L 41–55 vs. Central Missouri
- Conference: Lone Star Conference
- South Division

Ranking
- AFCA: No. 8
- Record: 11–1 (10–0 LSC)
- Head coach: Chris Thomsen (6th season)
- Offensive coordinator: Ken Collums (6th season)
- Offensive scheme: Spread
- Defensive coordinator: Jason Johns (5th season)
- Base defense: 3–4
- Home stadium: Shotwell Stadium

2010 Lone Star Conference football standings
	Conf.			Overall
Team	W		L	W		L
Overall*
No. 8 Abilene Christian $^	10	–	0	11	–	1
No. 9 Texas A&M–Kingsville ^	9	–	1	10	–	2
No. 18 W. Texas A&M ^	8	–	2	8	–	4
Midwestern State #	7	–	3	8	–	4
Northeastern State	6	–	4	6	–	5
East Central	5	–	5	5	–	6
Angelo State	5	–	5	5	–	5
SW Oklahoma State	4	–	6	4	–	7
Eastern New Mexico †	4	–	6	5	–	6
SE Oklahoma State	3	–	7	3	–	8
Tarleton State	3	–	7	3	–	8
Incarnate Word	3	–	7	3	–	8
Central Oklahoma	2	–	8	2	–	9
Texas A&M–Commerce	2	–	8	3	–	8
North
Northeastern State x	5	–	1	6	–	5
East Central x	5	–	1	5	–	6
SW Oklahoma State	4	–	2	4	–	7
Eastern New Mexico †	3	–	3	5	–	6
SE Oklahoma State	2	–	4	3	–	8
Central Oklahoma	1	–	5	2	–	9
Texas A&M–Commerce	1	–	5	3	–	8
South
No. 8 Abilene Christian x$^	6	–	0	11	–	1
No. 9 Texas A&M–Kingsville ^	5	–	1	10	–	2
No. 18 W. Texas A&M ^	4	–	2	8	–	4
Midwestern State #	3	–	3	8	–	4
Tarleton State	2	–	4	3	–	8
Angelo State	1	–	5	5	–	5
Incarnate Word	0	–	6	3	–	8
$ – Conference champion; ^ – NCAA Division II playoff participant; * – The LSC counted separate overall and division standings. † – Eastern New Mexico vacated all five wins. # – Kanza Bowl participant; Rankings from AFCA Poll

The 2010 Abilene Christian Wildcats football team was an American football team that represented Abilene Christian University (ACU) as a member of the South Division of the Lone Star Conference (LSC) during the 2010 NCAA Division II football season. In their sixth season under head coach Chris Thomsen, the Wildcats compiled an overall record of 11–1 record with a mark of 10–0 in conference play, winning the LSC and LSC South Division titles. Abilene Christian advanced to the NCAA Division II Football Championship playoffs, where, after a first-round bye, the Wildcats lost Central Missouri in the second round, 55–41. The team played home games at Shotwell Stadium in Abilene, Texas.

== Schedule ==
Date	Time	Opponent	Rank	Site	Result	Attendance
September 4	6:00 p.m.	at No. 9 Washburn*	No. 6	Yager Stadium; Topeka, KS	W 34–26	6,871
September 11	7:00 p.m.	at Northeastern State	No. 5	Doc Wadley Stadium; Tahlequah, OK	W 43–13	6,127
September 18	6:00 p.m.	East Central	No. 5	Shotwell Stadium; Abilene, TX	W 47–7	8,325
September 25	6:00 p.m.	Tarleton State	No. 5	Shotwell Stadium; Abilene, TX	W 65–3	7,836
October 2	7:00 p.m.	at No. 6 Texas A&M–Kingsville	No. 5	Javelina Stadium; Kinsgville, TX	W 31–24	15,550
October 9	2:00 p.m.	No. 8 Midwestern State	No. 5	Shotwell Stadium; Abilene, TX	W 31–28	13,486
October 16	7:00 p.m.	at Incarnate Word	No. 5	Gayle and Tom Benson Stadium; San Antonio, TX	W 54–17	3,325
October 23	3:00 p.m.	at Eastern New Mexico	No. 4	Greyhound Stadium; Portales, NM	W 53–14	2,526
October 30	2:00 p.m.	Angelo State	No. 3	Shotwell Stadium; Abilene, TX	W 33–20	6,342
November 6	6:00 p.m.	at No. 14 West Texas A&M	No. 2	Buffalo Stadium; Canyon, TX	W 41–34	13,827
November 13	12:00 p.m.	Southwestern Oklahoma State	No. 2	Shotwell Stadium; Abilene, TX	W 47–17	7,873
November 27	12:00 p.m.	No. 8 Central Missouri*	No. 2	Shotwell Stadium; Abilene, TX (NCAA Division II Second Round)	L 41–55	6,458
*Non-conference game; Rankings from AFCA Poll released prior to the game; All times are in Central time
