= 2010 West Texas A&M Buffaloes football team =

American college football season

2010 West Texas A&M Buffaloes football

NCAA Division II First Round, L 35–55 vs. Central Missouri
- Conference: Lone Star Conference
- South Division

Ranking
- AFCA: No. 18
- Record: 8–4 (8–2 LSC)
- Head coach: Don Carthel (6th season)
- Offensive coordinator: Mike Nesbitt (1st season)
- Offensive scheme: Air raid
- Defensive coordinator: Colby Carthel (5th season)
- Base defense: 3–4
- Home stadium: Kimbrough Memorial Stadium

2010 Lone Star Conference football standings
| | Conf. | | | Overall |
| Team | W | | L | W | | L |
|---|---|---|---|---|---|---|
Overall*
| No. 8 Abilene Christian $^ | 10 | – | 0 | 11 | – | 1 |
| No. 9 Texas A&M–Kingsville ^ | 9 | – | 1 | 10 | – | 2 |
| No. 18 W. Texas A&M ^ | 8 | – | 2 | 8 | – | 4 |
| Midwestern State # | 7 | – | 3 | 8 | – | 4 |
| Northeastern State | 6 | – | 4 | 6 | – | 5 |
| East Central | 5 | – | 5 | 5 | – | 6 |
| Angelo State | 5 | – | 5 | 5 | – | 5 |
| SW Oklahoma State | 4 | – | 6 | 4 | – | 7 |
| Eastern New Mexico † | 4 | – | 6 | 5 | – | 6 |
| SE Oklahoma State | 3 | – | 7 | 3 | – | 8 |
| Tarleton State | 3 | – | 7 | 3 | – | 8 |
| Incarnate Word | 3 | – | 7 | 3 | – | 8 |
| Central Oklahoma | 2 | – | 8 | 2 | – | 9 |
| Texas A&M–Commerce | 2 | – | 8 | 3 | – | 8 |
North Division
| Northeastern State x | 5 | – | 1 | 6 | – | 5 |
| East Central x | 5 | – | 1 | 5 | – | 6 |
| SW Oklahoma State | 4 | – | 2 | 4 | – | 7 |
| Eastern New Mexico † | 3 | – | 3 | 5 | – | 6 |
| SE Oklahoma State | 2 | – | 4 | 3 | – | 8 |
| Central Oklahoma | 1 | – | 5 | 2 | – | 9 |
| Texas A&M–Commerce | 1 | – | 5 | 3 | – | 8 |
South Division
| No. 8 Abilene Christian x$^ | 6 | – | 0 | 11 | – | 1 |
| No. 9 Texas A&M–Kingsville ^ | 5 | – | 1 | 10 | – | 2 |
| No. 18 W. Texas A&M ^ | 4 | – | 2 | 8 | – | 4 |
| Midwestern State # | 3 | – | 3 | 8 | – | 4 |
| Tarleton State | 2 | – | 4 | 3 | – | 8 |
| Angelo State | 1 | – | 5 | 5 | – | 5 |
| Incarnate Word | 0 | – | 6 | 3 | – | 8 |
$ – Conference champion; ^ – NCAA Division II playoff participant; * – The LSC counted separate overall and division standings. † – Eastern New Mexico vacated all five wins. # – Kanza Bowl participant; Rankings from AFCA Poll

The 2010 West Texas A&M Buffaloes football team represented West Texas A&M University during the 2010 NCAA Division II football season as a member of the Lone Star Conference (LSC). The Buffaloes were led by sixth-year head coach Don Carthel and played their home games at Kimbrough Memorial Stadium in Canyon, Texas.

The Buffs finished the regular season with an overall record of 8–3. In LSC play, the team went 8–2 to finish third in the conference's South Division. West Texas received a bid for the NCAA Division II playoffs, losing 35–55 to Central Missouri in the first round.

== Offseason ==
=== Coaching changes ===
Offensive coordinator Scott Parr was hired as the offensive quality control coach at Texas Tech by the Red Raiders' new head coach Tommy Tuberville. Quarterbacks coach Mike Nesbitt was promoted to be the Buffaloes' new offensive coordinator.

== Schedule ==
| Date | Time | Opponent | Rank | Site | Result | Attendance |
|---|---|---|---|---|---|---|
| September 2 | 7:00 p.m. | at No. 2 Grand Valley State* | No. 8 | Lubbers Stadium; Allendale, MI | L 31–34 | 13,128 |
| September 11 | 6:00 p.m. | at SW Oklahoma State | No. 9 | Milam Stadium; Weatherford, OK | W 77–14 | |
| September 18 | 6:00 p.m. | SE Oklahoma State | No. 9 | Kimbrough Memorial Stadium; Canyon, TX | W 41–17 | |
| September 25 | 6:00 p.m. | at Angelo State | No. 9 | San Angelo Stadium; San Angelo, TX | W 37–27 | |
| October 2 | 12:00 p.m. | at Northeastern State | No. 9 | Doc Wadley Stadium; Tahlequah, OK | W 34–22 | |
| October 9 | 6:00 p.m. | Tarleton State^{†} | No. 7 | Kimbrough Memorial Stadium; Canyon, TX | W 48–17 | |
| October 16 | 7:00 p.m. | at No. 9 Texas A&M–Kingsville | No. 7 | Javelina Stadium; Kingsville, TX | L 24–28 | |
| October 30 | 2:00 p.m. | at Incarnate Word | No. 14 | Gayle and Tom Benson Stadium; San Antonio, TX | W 49–10 | 2,679 |
| November 6 | 6:00 p.m. | No. 2 Abilene Christian | No. 14 | Kimbrough Memorial Stadium; Canyon, TX | L 34–41 | 13,827 |
| November 13 | 1:00 p.m. | East Central | No. 19 | Kimbrough Memorial Stadium; Canyon, TX | W 52–21 | |
| November 20 | 1:00 p.m. | at No. 8 Central Missouri* | No. 14 | Audrey J. Walton Stadium; Warrensburg, MO (NCAA Division II First Round) | L 35–55 | |
*Non-conference game; ^{†}Homecoming; Rankings from AFCA Poll released prior to the game; All times are in Central time

== Rankings ==
Ranking movements Legend: ██ Increase in ranking ██ Decrease in ranking
| | Week | | | | | | | | | | | | | |
| Poll | Pre | 1 | 2 | 3 | 4 | 5 | 6 | 7 | 8 | 9 | 10 | 11 | 12 | Final |
|---|---|---|---|---|---|---|---|---|---|---|---|---|---|---|
| AFCA | 11 | 8 | 9 | 9 | 9 | 9 | 7 | 7 | 17 | 14 | 14 | 19 | 14 | 18 |

== Game summaries ==
=== At No. 2 Grand Valley State ===
| | 1 | 2 | 3 | 4 | Total |
|---|---|---|---|---|---|
| No. 8 Buffaloes | 0 | 17 | 7 | 7 | 31 |
| No. 2 Lakers | 10 | 3 | 3 | 18 | 34 |

| Statistics | WTAMU | GVSU |
|---|---|---|
| First downs | 26 | 22 |
| Total yards | 567 | 475 |
| Rushing yards | 146 | 180 |
| Passing yards | 421 | 295 |
| Turnovers | 5 | 0 |
| Time of possession | 27:00 | 33:00 |

| Team | Category | Player | Statistics |
|---|---|---|---|
| West Texas A&M | Passing | Taylor Harris | 37/53, 421 yards, 2 TD, 4 INT |
| West Texas A&M | Rushing | Tommy Hampton | 5 rushes, 99 yards, TD |
| West Texas A&M | Receiving | Tyson Williams | 14 receptions, 182 yards |
| Grand Valley State | Passing | Kyle McMahon | 17/32, 295 yards, 2 TD |
| Grand Valley State | Rushing | Justin Sherrod | 14 rushes, 73 yards, TD |
| Grand Valley State | Receiving | Jovonne Augustus | 3 receptions, 107 yards, TD |

=== Southeastern Oklahoma State ===
| | 1 | 2 | 3 | 4 | Total |
|---|---|---|---|---|---|
| Savage Storm | 0 | 14 | 0 | 3 | 17 |
| No. 9 Buffaloes | 10 | 24 | 7 | 0 | 41 |

| Statistics | SOSU | WTAMU |
|---|---|---|
| First downs | 21 | 29 |
| Total yards | 335 | 656 |
| Rushing yards | 97 | 80 |
| Passing yards | 238 | 576 |
| Turnovers | 3 | 3 |
| Time of possession | 33:55 | 26:05 |

| Team | Category | Player | Statistics |
|---|---|---|---|
| SE Oklahoma State | Passing | Logan Turner | 17/42, 238 yards, 2 TD, INT |
| SE Oklahoma State | Rushing | Baylen Laury | 20 rushes, 102 yards |
| SE Oklahoma State | Receiving | Robbie Morris | 3 receptions, 51 yards, TD |
| West Texas A&M | Passing | Taylor Harris | 35/53, 562 yards, 5 TD, 2 INT |
| West Texas A&M | Rushing | Kelvin Thompson | 9 rushes, 49 yards |
| West Texas A&M | Receiving | Tyson Williams | 13 receptions, 217 yards, TD |

=== At Angelo State ===
| | 1 | 2 | 3 | 4 | Total |
|---|---|---|---|---|---|
| No. 9 Buffaloes | 16 | 21 | 0 | 0 | 37 |
| Rams | 13 | 0 | 7 | 7 | 27 |

| Statistics | WTAMU | ASU |
|---|---|---|
| First downs | 31 | 13 |
| Total yards | 532 | 311 |
| Rushing yards | 202 | 201 |
| Passing yards | 330 | 110 |
| Turnovers | 3 | 2 |
| Time of possession | 34:37 | 25:23 |

| Team | Category | Player | Statistics |
|---|---|---|---|
| West Texas A&M | Passing | Taylor Harris | 29/55, 320 yards, 3 INT |
| West Texas A&M | Rushing | Kelvin Thompson | 20 rushes, 127 yards, TD |
| West Texas A&M | Receiving | Stephen Burton | 7 receptions, 94 yards |
| Angelo State | Passing | Josh Neiswander | 14/34, 110 yards, 2 INT |
| Angelo State | Rushing | Tristan Carter | 13 rushes, 129 yards, 2 TD |
| Angelo State | Receiving | Nevin Gardiner | 3 receptions, 37 yards |

=== No. 13 Midwestern State ===
| | 1 | 2 | 3 | 4 | Total |
|---|---|---|---|---|---|
| No. 13 Mustangs | 3 | 0 | 12 | 14 | 29 |
| No. 17 Buffaloes | 7 | 14 | 14 | 7 | 42 |

| Statistics | MSU | WTAMU |
|---|---|---|
| First downs | 23 | 27 |
| Total yards | 363 | 447 |
| Rushing yards | 157 | 37 |
| Passing yards | 206 | 410 |
| Turnovers | 5 | 3 |
| Time of possession | 30:12 | 29:48 |

| Team | Category | Player | Statistics |
|---|---|---|---|
| Midwestern State | Passing | Zack Eskridge | 20/43, 206 yards, 3 TD, 4 INT |
| Midwestern State | Rushing | Keidrick Jackson | 12 rushes, 77 yards |
| Midwestern State | Receiving | Jared Freeman | 6 receptions, 70 yards |
| West Texas A&M | Passing | Taylor Harris | 41/60, 410 yards, 4 TD, 2 INT |
| West Texas A&M | Rushing | Kelvin Thompson | 9 rushes, 38 yards |
| West Texas A&M | Receiving | Stephen Burton | 7 receptions, 139 yards, TD |

=== At Incarnate Word ===
| | 1 | 2 | 3 | 4 | Total |
|---|---|---|---|---|---|
| No. 14 Buffaloes | 21 | 14 | 14 | 0 | 49 |
| Cardinals | 0 | 0 | 3 | 7 | 10 |

| Statistics | WTAMU | UIW |
|---|---|---|
| First downs | 19 | 14 |
| Total yards | 412 | 259 |
| Rushing yards | 165 | 133 |
| Passing yards | 247 | 126 |
| Turnovers | 0 | 3 |
| Time of possession | 28:04 | 31:56 |

| Team | Category | Player | Statistics |
|---|---|---|---|
| West Texas A&M | Passing | Taylor Harris | 21/34, 238 yards, 3 TD |
| West Texas A&M | Rushing | Kelvin Thompson | 7 rushes, 60 yards |
| West Texas A&M | Receiving | Tyson Williams | 4 receptions, 75 yards, 2 TD |
| Incarnate Word | Passing | Paden Lynch | 18/31, 126 yards, TD, INT |
| Incarnate Word | Rushing | Paden Lynch | 12 rushes, 84 yards |
| Incarnate Word | Receiving | Andrew Mocio | 4 receptions, 48 yards |

=== No. 2 Abilene Christian ===
| | 1 | 2 | 3 | 4 | Total |
|---|---|---|---|---|---|
| No. 2 Wildcats | 3 | 3 | 14 | 21 | 41 |
| No. 14 Buffaloes | 7 | 7 | 13 | 7 | 34 |

| Statistics | ACU | WTAMU |
|---|---|---|
| First downs | 27 | 30 |
| Total yards | 527 | 484 |
| Rushing yards | 231 | 38 |
| Passing yards | 296 | 446 |
| Turnovers | 1 | 4 |
| Time of possession | 33:30 | 26:30 |

| Team | Category | Player | Statistics |
|---|---|---|---|
| Abilene Christian | Passing | Mitchell Gale | 22/36, 296 yards, TD, INT |
| Abilene Christian | Rushing | Daryl Richardson | 19 rushes, 98 yards, 3 TD |
| Abilene Christian | Receiving | Edmond Gates | 4 receptions, 96 yards, TD |
| West Texas A&M | Passing | Taylor Harris | 39/60, 446 yards, 4 TD, 3 INT |
| West Texas A&M | Rushing | Kelvin Thompson | 8 rushes, 23 yards |
| West Texas A&M | Receiving | Tyson Williams | 13 receptions, 171 yards, 2 TD |

=== East Central ===
| | 1 | 2 | 3 | 4 | Total |
|---|---|---|---|---|---|
| Tigers | 0 | 0 | 14 | 7 | 21 |
| No. 19 Buffaloes | 14 | 14 | 10 | 14 | 52 |

| Statistics | ECU | WTAMU |
|---|---|---|
| First downs | 17 | 33 |
| Total yards | 297 | 735 |
| Rushing yards | 50 | 130 |
| Passing yards | 247 | 605 |
| Turnovers | 2 | 1 |
| Time of possession | 27:42 | 32:18 |

| Team | Category | Player | Statistics |
|---|---|---|---|
| East Central | Passing | Tyler Vanderzee | 18/34, 207 yards, 2 TD, INT |
| East Central | Rushing | Justin Todd | 9 rushes, 29 yards |
| East Central | Receiving | Cleotha Euwins | 4 receptions, 94 yards, 2 TD |
| West Texas A&M | Passing | Taylor Harris | 43/65, 572 yards, 5 TD |
| West Texas A&M | Rushing | Kelvin Thompson | 10 rushes, 76 yards |
| West Texas A&M | Receiving | Tyson Williams | 12 receptions, 203 yards |

=== At No. 8 Central Missouri (NCAA Division II First Round) ===
| | 1 | 2 | 3 | 4 | Total |
|---|---|---|---|---|---|
| No. 14 Buffaloes | 0 | 7 | 14 | 14 | 35 |
| No. 8 Mules | 21 | 14 | 20 | 0 | 55 |

| Statistics | WTAMU | UCM |
|---|---|---|
| First downs | 28 | 27 |
| Total yards | 527 | 512 |
| Rushing yards | 32 | 144 |
| Passing yards | 495 | 368 |
| Turnovers | 3 | 1 |
| Time of possession | 24:53 | 35:07 |

| Team | Category | Player | Statistics |
|---|---|---|---|
| West Texas A&M | Passing | Taylor Harris | 35/66, 495 yards, 4 TD, 3 INT |
| West Texas A&M | Rushing | Tevin Mitchell | 2 rushes, 19 yards |
| West Texas A&M | Receiving | Brittan Golden | 8 receptions, 194 yards, 2 TD |
| Central Missouri | Passing | Eric Czerniewski | 33/42, 368 yards, 4 TD |
| Central Missouri | Rushing | Anthony Stewart | 15 rushes, 112 yards, 2 TD |
| Central Missouri | Receiving | Anthony Stewart | 10 receptions, 131 yards, TD |

== Personnel ==
2010 West Texas A&M Buffaloes football team roster
Players
Coaches
Offense

| Pos. | # | Name | Class |
|---|---|---|---|
| WR | 2 | Tyson Williams | Jr |
| RB | 5 | Kelvin Thompson | Sr |
| WR | 9 | Brittan Golden | Jr |
| WR | 10 | Myron Dillard | Jr |
| WR | 11 | Stephen Burton | Sr |
| QB | 12 | Taylor Harris | Sr |
| QB | 14 | Dustin Vaughan | Fr |
| QB | 16 | Tanner Marsh | So |
| WR | 17 | Lance Ratliff | Fr |
| WR | 19 | Ray Magee | Jr |
| WR | 23 | Jeremy Watson | So |
| RB | 24 | Tommy Hampton | Jr |
| WR | 25 | Nate Slaughter | Fr |
| WR | 27 | Aarrhon Flores | So |
| QB | 31 | David Lehocky | Fr |
| TE | 34 | Kendrick Cutsinger | Jr |
| WR | 37 | Alex Reyes | Fr |
| RB | 42 | Jay Tillman | So |
| RB | 45 | Tevin Mitchell | So |
| OL | 53 | Isaiah Lewis | Sr |
| OL | 55 | Aaron Mullane | So |
| OL | 60 | Hector Rodriguez | Jr |
| OL | 61 | Frank Arriola | Jr |
| OL | 62 | Daric Gorton | Fr |
| OL | 63 | Justin Brown Jr. | Jr |
| OL | 64 | Craig Watts | Fr |
| OL | 65 | Robert Clancy | Fr |
| OL | 68 | Marc Waller | Fr |
| OL | 69 | Jordan Nichols | Fr |
| OL | 70 | Shawn Johnson | Jr |
| OL | 71 | Michael Zoch | Jr |
| OL | 72 | Chase Farmer | Fr |
| OL | 73 | David Grant | Jr |
| OL | 74 | Emory Atterberry | Fr |
| OL | 76 | Dan Sherwood | Sr |
| OL | 77 | Kyle Nicholson | Fr |
| OL | 78 | Shaun Wesley | So |
| TE | 80 | Landon Forga | So |
| WR | 81 | Sidney Parker | Fr |
| WR | 82 | Trevor Hammargren | Fr |
| WR | 84 | Torrence Allen | Fr |
| WR | 86 | Tanner Dennis | Fr |
| QB | 87 | Zach Richter | Fr |
| WR | 89 | Keith'n Robinson | Sr |
| WR | 89 | John Simpson | Fr |

Defense

| Pos. | # | Name | Class |
|---|---|---|---|
| DB | 1 | Jordan Smith | So |
| DB | 3 | Caleb Randolph | Jr |
| DE | 4 | Tae Evans | Sr |
| LB | 6 | Glen Stanley | Jr |
| DB | 7 | Lawrence Hood | Sr |
| DB | 18 | Tarin Lee | Fr |
| OLB | 19 | Bryan Johnson | Jr |
| LB | 20 | Anthony Scott | Sr |
| DB | 21 | Maurice Caldwell | Jr |
| DB | 22 | Curtis Slater | So |
| DB | 26 | John McSheffrey | Fr |
| DL | 28 | Simi Kuli | Jr |
| DB | 29 | Thaddeus McCray | Fr |
| DB | 30 | Kendrick Geyen | Fr |
| ILB | 32 | Taylor McCuller | Fr |
| DL | 33 | Derrick Peoples | Jr |
| DB | 36 | Dwight Morrison | Fr |
| DB | 38 | Curtis Jefferson | Jr |
| LB | 39 | Brandon Boyd | Fr |
| LB | 40 | Chris Olson | Fr |
| DB | 43 | Shad Baichtal | Sr |
| ILB | 44 | Steve Smith | Sr |
| ILB | 46 | Kyle Voss | So |
| DB | 48 | Mark Okoro | So |
| LB | 49 | D. J. Ross | Jr |
| ILB | 50 | Kevin McCluskey | So |
| ILB | 51 | Drew Graham | Jr |
| OLB | 52 | Zane Farris | Jr |
| LB | 54 | James Smith | Jr |
| LB | 57 | Victor Cuero | So |
| DL | 58 | Levi Sparks | So |
| LB | 59 | Ronnie Hodges | Fr |
| DL | 66 | David Christmas | Fr |
| LB | 67 | Hayden Rybiski | Fr |
| DL | 75 | Tony Scott | Fr |
| DB | 83 | Steven Wright | Fr |
| DL | 90 | Kyle Thomas | Sr |
| DL | 91 | Dishon Robertson | Jr |
| DL | 92 | Terrance Harris | So |
| DL | 93 | Aaron Wampler | So |
| DL | 94 | Justin Williams | Jr |
| DL | 95 | William Thornton | Fr |
| DL | 96 | Rashad Sanders | Jr |
| DL | 97 | Servell Dandridge | So |
| DL | 98 | Drew Jones | Jr |
| DL | 99 | Jonathan Hatton | Jr |
| DL | | Jacob Davis | So |

Special teams

| Pos. | # | Name | Class |
|---|---|---|---|
| P, K | 13 | Kevin Vanvoris | Fr |
| P, K | 15 | Todd Phillips | So |
| P, K | 41 | Sergio Castillo | Fr |
| P | 88 | Tim Cowdrey | Sr |

Head coach

- Don Carthel

Coordinators/assistant coaches

- Billy Best
  Associate head coach/offensive line
- Mike Nesbitt
  Offensive coordinator/quarterbacks
- Colby Carthel
  Defensive coordinator/inside linebackers
- Nick Paremski
  Secondary
- Joel Hinton
  Inside receivers
- Jarrod Hinton
  Outside linebackers
- Matt Landers
  Assistant inside linebackers
- Brandon Romero
  Defensive line
- Jared May
  Outside receivers
- Brett Watson
  Defensive line
- Devario Dorsey
  Assistant offensive line
- Sarah Ramey
  Strength and conditioning

Legend

- (C) Team captain
- (S) Suspended
- (I) Ineligible
- Injured
- Redshirt

Roster
Last update: October 11, 2024
