= 2010 California Vulcans football team =

American college football season

2010 California Vulcans football

PSAC West Division co-champion

NCAA Division II First Round, L 26–28 vs. Bloomsburg
- Conference: Pennsylvania State Athletic Conference
- West Division

Ranking
- AFCA: No. 14
- Record: 10–2 (6–1 PSAC)
- Head coach: John Luckhardt (9th season)
- Offensive coordinator: Chad Salisbury (2nd season)
- Home stadium: Adamson Stadium

2010 Pennsylvania State Athletic Conference football standings
	Conf.			Overall
Team	W		L	W		L
East
No. 15 Bloomsburg xy^	7	–	0	10	–	3
No. 13 Kutztown ^	6	–	1	10	–	2
C. W. Post	5	–	2	7	–	4
West Chester	4	–	3	4	–	7
Shippensburg	3	–	4	5	–	6
East Stroudsburg	2	–	5	3	–	8
Cheyney	1	–	6	1	–	10
Millersville	0	–	7	2	–	9
West
No. 14 California (PA) x^	6	–	1	10	–	2
No. 11 Mercyhurst xy$^	6	–	1	10	–	3
Gannon	4	–	3	6	–	5
Edinboro	3	–	4	7	–	4
IUP	3	–	4	6	–	5
Slippery Rock	3	–	4	6	–	5
Clarion	3	–	4	4	–	7
Lock Haven	0	–	7	0	–	11
Championship: Mercyhurst 56, Bloomsburg 37
$ – Conference champion; x – Division champion/co-champions; y – Championship game participant; ^ – NCAA Division II playoff participant; Rankings from AFCA poll

The 2010 California Vulcans football team represented California University of Pennsylvania as a member of the West Division of the Pennsylvania State Athletic Conference (PSAC) during the 2010 NCAA Division II football season. Led by ninth-year head coach John Luckhardt, California compiled an overall record of 10–2 with a mark of 6–1 in conference play, sharing the PSAC West Division title with Mercyhurst. The Vulcans advanced to the NCAA Division II Football Championship playoffs, where they lost to the PSAC East Division champion, Bloomsburg, in the first round. The team's offense scored 417 points while the defense allowed 173 points. The Vulcans played home games at Adamson Stadium in California, Pennsylvania.

== Schedule ==
Date	Time	Opponent	Rank	Site	TV	Result	Attendance
September 4	12:00 p.m.	at No. 11 Saginaw Valley State*	No. 5	Wickes Stadium; University Center, MI		W 42–41	5,837
September 11	1:00 p.m.	at C. W. Post*	No. 4	Hickox Field; Brookville, NY		W 40–13	2,317
September 18	3:30 p.m.	East Stroudsburg*	No. 4	Adamson Stadium; California, PA		W 45–20	4,124
September 25	6:00 p.m.	at Clarion	No. 4	Memorial Stadium; Clarion, PA		W 24–9	4,000
October 2	1:00 p.m.	Lock Haven	No. 4	Adamson Stadium; California, PA	WPCW	W 58–0	3,862
October 9	12:00 p.m.	at Gannon	No. 4	Gannon University Field; Erie, PA		W 34–7	1,542
October 16	3:30 p.m.	Slippery Rock^{†}	No. 4	Adamson Stadium; California, PA	WPCW	W 28–3	5,157
October 23	12:00 p.m.	at Mercyhurst	No. 3	Tullio Field; Erie, PA		L 21–31	927
October 30	1:00 p.m.	IUP	No. 12	Adamson Stadium; California, PA (Coal Bowl)	WPCW	W 18–15 ^{OT}	2,169
November 6	1:00 p.m.	at Edinboro	No. 12	Sox Harrison Stadium; Edinboro, PA		W 24–0	2,121
November 13	1:00 p.m.	Cheyney*	No. 10	Adamson Stadium; California, PA	WPCW	W 57–6	1,612
November 20	12:00 p.m.	No. 20 Bloomsburg*	No. 7	Adamson Stadium; California, PA (NCAA Division II First Round)		L 26–28	4,123
*Non-conference game; ^{†}Homecoming; Rankings from AFCA Poll released prior to the game; All times are in Eastern time
