= 2011 Central Oklahoma Bronchos football team =

American college football season

2011 Central Oklahoma Bronchos football
- Conference: Independent
- Record: 2–9
- Head coach: Tracy Holland (4th season)
- Home stadium: Wantland Stadium

2011 NCAA Division II independents football records
	Conf.			Overall
Team	W		L	W		L
No. 12 North Greenville ^		–		11	–	3
UNC Pembroke		–		8	–	3
Northeastern State		–		7	–	5
Southwest Baptist		–		6	–	5
Notre Dame (OH)		–		5	–	6
OK Panhandle State		–		3	–	7
Central Oklahoma		–		2	–	9
Central State		–		1	–	10
^ – NCAA Division II playoff participant; Rankings from AFCA Poll

The 2011 Central Oklahoma Bronchos football team represented the University of Central Oklahoma in the 2011 college football season, the 106th season of Broncho football. The team was led by fourth year head coach Tracy Holland. They played their home games at Wantland Stadium in Edmond, Oklahoma. The Bronchos were playing this season as an Independent because they were changing conference membership from the Lone Star Conference to the Mid-America Intercollegiate Athletics Association.

The season began play began with loss to North Alabama on the road on September 1, and ended with loss at home to Lindenwood on November 12. The Bronchos finished the season 2-9. After the season, the Bronchos fired head coach Tracy Holland.

== Schedule ==
Date	Time	Opponent	Rank	Site	TV	Result	Attendance
September 1	7:00 p.m.	at No. 6 North Alabama*	No. RV	Braly Municipal Stadium; Florence, AL	Cox 3	L 10–31	?
September 10	6:10 p.m.	at Southeastern Oklahoma State*		Paul Laird Field; Durant, OK		L 23–30	?
September 17	2:00 p.m.	at Angelo State*		San Angelo Stadium; San Angelo, TX		L 0–20	?
September 24	6:00 p.m.	at Southwestern Oklahoma State*		Milam Stadium; Weatherford, OK		L 20–27	?
October 1	2:00 p.m.	East Central (OK)*^{†}		Wantland Stadium; Edmond, OK		W 41–21	?
October 8	4:05 p.m. (PT)	at Cal Poly*		Alex G. Spanos Stadium; San Luis Obispo, CA		L 25–44	?
October 15	1:00 p.m.	at No. 5 Washburn*		Yager Stadium; Topeka, KS		L 3–48	?
October 22	2:00 p.m.	Fort Hays State*		Wantland Stadium; Edmond, OK		L 21–38	?
October 27	6:00 p.m.	Black Hills State		Wantland Stadium; Edmond, OK		W 30–17	?
November 5	2:00 p.m.	Northeastern State (OK)		Wantland Stadium; Edmond, OK (President's Cup)		L 7–35	?
November 12	2:00 p.m.	Lindenwood		Wantland Stadium; Edmond, OK		L 14–48	?
*Non-conference game; ^{†}Homecoming; Rankings from AFCA DII Coaches' Poll released prior to game; All times are in Central time
