= 2010 North Alabama Lions football team =

American college football season

2010 North Alabama Lions football

NCAA Division II Second Round, L 21–47 at Delta State
- Conference: Gulf South Conference
- Record: 9–4 (5–3 GSC)
- Head coach: Terry Bowden (2nd season)
- Offensive coordinator: Alan Arrington (3rd season)
- Defensive coordinator: Tony Pecoraro (1st season)
- Home stadium: Braly Municipal Stadium

2010 Gulf South Conference football standings
	Conf.			Overall
Team	W		L	W		L
No. 2 Delta State +^	6	–	2	11	–	4
No. 17 Valdosta State +^	6	–	2	8	–	3
Henderson State +	6	–	2	7	–	4
No. 22 North Alabama ^	5	–	3	9	–	4
West Alabama	5	–	3	7	–	4
Ouachita Baptist	4	–	4	6	–	4
Harding	4	–	4	6	–	4
Arkansas–Monticello	3	–	5	4	–	7
Arkansas Tech	2	–	6	4	–	7
West Georgia	2	–	6	3	–	7
Southern Arkansas	1	–	7	1	–	9
+ – Conference co-champions; ^ – NCAA Division II playoff participant; Rankings from AFCA poll

The 2010 North Alabama Lions football team represented the University of North Alabama as a member of the Gulf South Conference (GSC) during the 2010 NCAA Division II football season. Led by second-year head coach Terry Bowden, the Lions compiled an overall record of 9–4 with a mark of 5–3 in conference play, tying for fourth place the GSC. For the sixth straight season, North Alabama advanced to the NCAA Division II football championship playoffs, where the Lions defeated GSC co-champion Valdosta State in the first round before losing to another GSC co-champion, Delta State, in the second round. The team played home games at Braly Municipal Stadium in Florence, Alabama.

== Schedule ==
Date	Time	Opponent	Rank	Site	TV	Result	Attendance
September 4	6:00 p.m.	Henderson State*	No. 3	Braly Municipal Stadium; Florence, AL		W 27–10	10,521
September 11		at Glenville State*	No. 3	Morris Stadium; Glenville, WV		W 54–10	600
September 18	6:00 p.m.	Southern Arkansas	No. 3	Braly Municipal Stadium; Florence, AL		W 48–6	12,644
September 25	12:00 p.m.	at Lambuth*	No. 3	Trinity Christian Academy; Jackson, TN		W 31–0	750
October 4	6:00 p.m.	Arkansas Tech^{†}	No. 3	Braly Municipal Stadium; Florence, AL		W 28–0	9,121
October 9	1:00 p.m.	at West Georgia	No. 3	University Stadium; Carrollton, GA		W 17–10	5,307
October 14	7:00 p.m.	No. 19 Valdosta State	No. 3	Braly Municipal Stadium; Florence, AL	CSS	L 0–5	9,626
October 23	1:30 p.m.	at Ouachita Baptist	No. 10	A. U. Williams Field; Arkadelphia, AR		L 23–24 ^{OT}	4,000
October 28	7:00 p.m.	at No. 19 Delta State	No. 21	McCool Stadium; Cleveland, MS	CSS	W 31–7	5,123
November 6	6:00 p.m.	West Alabama	No. 18	Braly Municipal Stadium; Florence, AL (rivalry)		W 24–23	8,752
November 13	6:00 p.m.	at Harding	No. 15	First Security Stadium; Searcy, AR		L 28–29	1,579
November 20	12:00 p.m.	at No. 17 Valdosta State		Bazemore–Hyder Stadium; Valdosta, GA (NCAA Division II First Round)		W 43–20	2,976
November 27		at Delta State		McCool Stadium; Cleveland, MS (NCAA Division II Second Round)		L 47–21	4,123
*Non-conference game; ^{†}Homecoming; Rankings from AFCA Poll released prior to the game; All times are in Central time
