= 2010 CSU Pueblo ThunderWolves football team =

American college football season

2010 CSU Pueblo ThunderWolves football
- Conference: Rocky Mountain Athletic Conference
- Record: 9–2 (7–2 RMAC)
- Head coach: John Wristen (3rd season)
- Offensive scheme: Pro spread
- Defensive coordinator: Hunter Hughes (3rd season)
- Base defense: 3–4
- Home stadium: Neta and Eddie DeRose ThunderBowl

2010 Rocky Mountain Athletic Conference football standings
	Conf.			Overall
Team	W		L	W		L
No. 23 Nebraska–Kearney +	8	–	1	9	–	2
No. 19 Colorado Mines +^	8	–	1	9	–	3
CSU Pueblo	7	–	2	9	–	2
Chadron State	7	–	2	8	–	3
Adams State	4	–	5	5	–	6
Western New Mexico	3	–	6	4	–	7
Mesa State	3	–	6	3	–	7
Fort Lewis	3	–	6	3	–	7
Western State (CO)	1	–	8	1	–	10
New Mexico Highlands	1	–	8	1	–	10
+ – Conference co-champions; ^ – NCAA Division II playoff participant; Rankings from AFCA poll

The 2010 CSU Pueblo ThunderWolves football team represented Colorado State University Pueblo as a member of the Rocky Mountain Athletic Conference (RMAC) during 2010 NCAA Division II football season. Led by third-year head coach John Wristen, the ThunderWolves compiled an overall record of 9–2 with a mark of 7–2 in conference play, tying for third place in the RMAC. CSU Pueblo played their home games at Neta and Eddie DeRose ThunderBowl in Pueblo, Colorado.

== Schedule ==
Date	Time	Opponent	Rank	Site	Result	Attendance
August 28	7:00 pm	at Oklahoma Panhandle State*		Carl Wooten Field; Goodwell, OK	W 26–14	2,500
September 4	6:00 pm	Northwestern Oklahoma State*		Neta and Eddie DeRose ThunderBowl; Pueblo, CO	W 55–13	6,723
September 18	6:00 pm	Adams State		Neta and Eddie DeRose ThunderBowl; Pueblo, CO	W 27–10	6,068
September 25	1:00 pm	at Fort Lewis		Ray Dennison Field; Durango, CO	W 49–14	1,335
October 2	2:00 pm	Chadron State^{†}		Neta and Eddie DeRose ThunderBowl; Pueblo, CO	W 33–30 ^{3OT}	6,431
October 9	12:00 pm	at Colorado Mines	No. 25	Campbell Field; Golden, CO	L 16–19	3,216
October 16	2:00 pm	No. 13 Nebraska–Kearney		Neta and Eddie DeRose ThunderBowl; Pueblo, CO	L 24–38	5,905
October 23	6:40 pm	at Mesa State		Stocker Stadium; Grand Junction, CO	W 26–14	529
October 30	6:00 pm	New Mexico Highlands		Neta and Eddie DeRose ThunderBowl; Pueblo, CO	W 66–0	5,268
November 6	1:00 pm	at Western State (CO)		Mountaineer Bowl; Gunnison, CO	W 37–3	440
November 13	12:00 pm	at Western New Mexico		Ben Altamirano Stadium; Silver City, NM	W 45–17	652
*Non-conference game; ^{†}Homecoming; Rankings from AFCA Poll released prior to the game; All times are in Mountain time

== Rankings ==
Ranking movements Legend: ██ Increase in ranking ██ Decrease in ranking — = Not ranked RV = Received votes
	Week												
Poll	Pre	1	2	3	4	5	6	7	8	9	10	11	Final
AFCA poll	—	—	RV	RV	RV	RV	25	RV	—	RV	RV	RV	RV
