= 2010 Central Oklahoma Bronchos football team =

American college football season

2010 Central Oklahoma Bronchos football
- Conference: Lone Star Conference
- North
- Record: 2–9 (2–8 LSC)
- Head coach: Tracy Holland (4th season)
- Home stadium: Wantland Stadium (Capacity: 10,000)

2010 Lone Star Conference football standings
	Conf.			Overall
Team	W		L	W		L
Overall*
No. 8 Abilene Christian $^	10	–	0	11	–	1
No. 9 Texas A&M–Kingsville ^	9	–	1	10	–	2
No. 18 W. Texas A&M ^	8	–	2	8	–	4
Midwestern State #	7	–	3	8	–	4
Northeastern State	6	–	4	6	–	5
East Central	5	–	5	5	–	6
Angelo State	5	–	5	5	–	5
SW Oklahoma State	4	–	6	4	–	7
Eastern New Mexico †	4	–	6	5	–	6
SE Oklahoma State	3	–	7	3	–	8
Tarleton State	3	–	7	3	–	8
Incarnate Word	3	–	7	3	–	8
Central Oklahoma	2	–	8	2	–	9
Texas A&M–Commerce	2	–	8	3	–	8
North Division
Northeastern State x	5	–	1	6	–	5
East Central x	5	–	1	5	–	6
SW Oklahoma State	4	–	2	4	–	7
Eastern New Mexico †	3	–	3	5	–	6
SE Oklahoma State	2	–	4	3	–	8
Central Oklahoma	1	–	5	2	–	9
Texas A&M–Commerce	1	–	5	3	–	8
South Division
No. 8 Abilene Christian x$^	6	–	0	11	–	1
No. 9 Texas A&M–Kingsville ^	5	–	1	10	–	2
No. 18 W. Texas A&M ^	4	–	2	8	–	4
Midwestern State #	3	–	3	8	–	4
Tarleton State	2	–	4	3	–	8
Angelo State	1	–	5	5	–	5
Incarnate Word	0	–	6	3	–	8
$ – Conference champion; ^ – NCAA Division II playoff participant; * – The LSC counted separate overall and division standings. † – Eastern New Mexico vacated all five wins. # – Kanza Bowl participant; Rankings from AFCA Poll

The 2010 Central Oklahoma Bronchos football team represented the University of Central Oklahoma in the 2010 NCAA Division II football season, the 105th season of Broncho football. The team was led by fourth year head coach Tracy Holland. They played their home games at Wantland Stadium in Edmond, Oklahoma. The Bronchos were playing this season in their final year of membership in the Lone Star Conference, because they were changing conference affiliation to the Mid-America Intercollegiate Athletics Association.

The season began play began with loss to Pittsburg State at home on August 28, and ended with loss on the road to Angelo State on November 13. The Bronchos finished the season 2–9, with a conference record of 2–8 in conference play and 1–5 in the Lone Star North Division. The Lone Star Conference had a separate format for choosing conference champions and division champions.

== Schedule ==
Date	Time	Opponent	Site	Result	Attendance
September 1	7:00 p.m.	Pittsburg State*	Wantland Stadium; Edmond, OK	L 20–31	?
September 11	7:00 p.m.	Tarleton State	Wantland Stadium; Edmond, OK	W 37–21	?
September 18	7:00 p.m.	at Incarnate Word	Gayle and Tom Benson Stadium; San Antonio, TX	L 41–42 ^{OT}	?
September 25	7:00 p.m.	Midwestern State	Wantland Stadium; Edmond, OK	L 24–30	?
October 2	7:00 p.m.	East Central	Wantland Stadium; Edmond, OK	W 31–28	?
October 9	3:00 p.m.	at Eastern New Mexico	Greyhound Stadium; Portales, NM	L 31–49	?
October 16	2:00 p.m.	Southeastern Oklahoma State^{†}	Wantland Stadium; Edmond, OK	L 55–56	?
October 23	2:00 p.m.	at Northeastern State	Doc Wadley Stadium; Tahlequah, OK (President's Cup)	L 28–39	?
October 30	6:00 p.m.	Texas A&M–Commerce	Wantland Stadium; Edmond, OK	L 30–31	?
November 5	2:00 p.m.	Southwestern Oklahoma State	Milam Stadium; Weatherford, OK	L 24–31	?
November 12	2:00 p.m.	at Angelo State	San Angelo Stadium; San Angelo, TX	L 35–49	?
*Non-conference game; ^{†}Homecoming; All times are in Central time
