= 2010 NCAA Division II football season =

American college football season

- Regular season: September 4 – November 13, 2010
- Playoffs: November 20 – December 18, 2010
- National Championship: Braly Municipal Stadium; Florence, AL
- Champion: Minnesota–Duluth
- Harlon Hill Trophy: Eric Czerniewski, Central Missouri

The 2010 NCAA Division II football season, part of college football in the United States organized by the National Collegiate Athletic Association at the Division II level, began on September 4, 2010, and concluded with the NCAA Division II Football Championship on December 18, 2010 at Braly Municipal Stadium in Florence, Alabama, hosted by the University of North Alabama. The Minnesota–Duluth Bulldogs defeated the Delta State Statesmen, 20–17, to win their second Division II national title.

The Harlon Hill Trophy was awarded to Eric Czerniewski, quarterback from Central Missouri.

== Conference and program changes ==
School	Former conference	New conference
Central State Marauders	GLFC	Independent
Incarnate Word Cardinals	Independent	Lone Star
Lake Erie Storm	Independent	GLIAC
Lambuth Eagles	Mid-South (NAIA)	Independent
Lincoln (MO) Blue Tigers	GLFC	Independent
Lincoln (PA) Lions	Independent	CIAA
Notre Dame Falcons	New program	Independent
Ohio Dominican Panthers	Independent	GLIAC
Simon Fraser Clan	Canada West (CIS)	GNAC
Urbana Blue Knights	Independent	GLFC
Winston-Salem State Rams	Independent (FCS)	CIAA

Lincoln (PA) and Urbana completed their transitions to Division II and became eligible for the postseason.

== Conference standings ==
=== Super Region 1 ===
2010 Central Intercollegiate Athletic Association football standings
	Conf.			Overall
Team	W		L	W		L
Northern Division
Virginia State xy	6	–	1	8	–	3
Bowie State x	6	–	1	6	–	4
Elizabeth City State	5	–	2	6	–	4
Chowan	3	–	4	3	–	7
Virginia Union	3	–	4	3	–	7
Saint Paul's	2	–	5	2	–	8
Lincoln (PA)	0	–	7	1	–	9
Southern Division
Shaw xy$^	7	–	0	9	–	3
St. Augustine's #	6	–	1	9	–	2
Winston-Salem State	5	–	2	8	–	2
Fayetteville State	4	–	3	5	–	5
Johnson C. Smith	1	–	6	2	–	8
Livingstone	0	–	7	0	–	11
Championship: Shaw 14, Virginia State 7
$ – Conference champion; x – Division champion/co-champions; y – Championship game participant; ^ – NCAA Division II playoff participant; # – Pioneer Bowl participant

2010 Northeast-10 Conference football standings
	Conf.			Overall
Team	W		L	W		L
New Haven +	6	–	2	8	–	2
American International +	6	–	2	6	–	4
Southern Connecticut +	6	–	2	6	–	4
Bentley +	5	–	2	5	–	4
Merrimack	4	–	4	4	–	6
Assumption	3	–	5	6	–	5
Stonehill	3	–	5	5	–	5
Saint Anselm	2	–	6	2	–	8
Pace	0	–	7	0	–	9
+ – Conference co-champions

2010 Pennsylvania State Athletic Conference football standings
	Conf.			Overall
Team	W		L	W		L
East
No. 15 Bloomsburg xy^	7	–	0	10	–	3
No. 13 Kutztown ^	6	–	1	10	–	2
C. W. Post	5	–	2	7	–	4
West Chester	4	–	3	4	–	7
Shippensburg	3	–	4	5	–	6
East Stroudsburg	2	–	5	3	–	8
Cheyney	1	–	6	1	–	10
Millersville	0	–	7	2	–	9
West
No. 14 California (PA) x^	6	–	1	10	–	2
No. 11 Mercyhurst xy$^	6	–	1	10	–	3
Gannon	4	–	3	6	–	5
Edinboro	3	–	4	7	–	4
IUP	3	–	4	6	–	5
Slippery Rock	3	–	4	6	–	5
Clarion	3	–	4	4	–	7
Lock Haven	0	–	7	0	–	11
Championship: Mercyhurst 56, Bloomsburg 37
$ – Conference champion; x – Division champion/co-champions; y – Championship game participant; ^ – NCAA Division II playoff participant; Rankings from AFCA poll

2010 West Virginia Intercollegiate Athletic Conference football standings
	Conf.			Overall
Team	W		L	W		L
No. 7 Shepherd $^	7	–	1	12	–	2
West Virginia Wesleyan	6	–	2	9	–	2
West Liberty	6	–	2	7	–	3
Concord	5	–	3	8	–	3
Charleston (WV)	4	–	4	6	–	5
Glenville State	4	–	4	5	–	6
Fairmont State	3	–	5	5	–	6
Seton Hill	1	–	7	2	–	9
West Virginia State	0	–	8	0	–	10
$ – Conference champion; ^ – NCAA Division II playoff participant; Rankings from AFCA Poll

=== Super Region 2 ===
2010 Gulf South Conference football standings
	Conf.			Overall
Team	W		L	W		L
No. 2 Delta State +^	6	–	2	11	–	4
No. 17 Valdosta State +^	6	–	2	8	–	3
Henderson State +	6	–	2	7	–	4
No. 22 North Alabama ^	5	–	3	9	–	4
West Alabama	5	–	3	7	–	4
Ouachita Baptist	4	–	4	6	–	4
Harding	4	–	4	6	–	4
Arkansas–Monticello	3	–	5	4	–	7
Arkansas Tech	2	–	6	4	–	7
West Georgia	2	–	6	3	–	7
Southern Arkansas	1	–	7	1	–	9
+ – Conference co-champions; ^ – NCAA Division II playoff participant; Rankings from AFCA poll

2010 South Atlantic Conference football standings
	Conf.			Overall
Team	W		L	W		L
No. 20 Wingate $^	6	–	1	9	–	3
Carson–Newman	5	–	2	7	–	4
Lenoir–Rhyne	4	–	3	7	–	4
Catawba	4	–	3	6	–	4
Mars Hill	3	–	4	5	–	6
Newberry	3	–	4	4	–	6
Tusculum	2	–	5	6	–	5
Brevard	1	–	6	4	–	7
$ – Conference champion; ^ – NCAA Division II playoff participant; Rankings from AFCA poll

2010 Southern Intercollegiate Athletic Conference football standings
	Conf.			Overall
Team	W		L	W		L
No. 4 Albany State $^	9	–	0	11	–	1
Tuskegee	7	–	2	9	–	2
Fort Valley State #	7	–	2	8	–	3
Morehouse ^	7	–	2	8	–	3
Benedict	4	–	5	5	–	6
Clark Atlanta	4	–	5	4	–	6
Miles	3	–	6	3	–	8
Stillman	2	–	7	3	–	8
Kentucky State	2	–	7	3	–	8
Lane	0	–	9	0	–	10
$ – Conference champion; ^ – NCAA Division II playoff participant; # – Pioneer Bowl participant; Rankings from AFCA poll

2010 NCAA Division II Super Region 2 independents football records
	Conf.			Overall
Team	W		L	W		L
North Greenville		–		8	–	3
UNC Pembroke		–		5	–	5
Lambuth #		–		4	–	6
# – Provisional Division II member; Rankings from AFCA Poll

=== Super Region 3 ===
2010 Great Lakes Intercollegiate Athletic Conference football standings
	Conf.			Overall
Team	W		L	W		L
North
No. 10 Grand Valley State $^	9	–	1	11	–	2
No. 25 Michigan Tech	8	–	2	8	–	2
Indianapolis	5	–	5	6	–	5
Ferris State	5	–	5	5	–	6
Northern Michigan	5	–	5	5	–	6
Northwood	5	–	5	5	–	6
Saginaw Valley State	4	–	6	4	–	7
South
No. 21 Wayne State (MI)	8	–	2	9	–	2
No. 16 Hillsdale ^	8	–	2	9	–	3
Ashland	7	–	3	8	–	3
Lake Erie	3	–	7	3	–	8
Ohio Dominican *	2	–	8	2	–	8
Findlay	1	–	9	1	–	10
Tiffin	0	–	10	1	–	10
$ – Conference champion; ^ – NCAA Division II playoff participant; * – Provisional NCAA Division II member; Rankings from AFCA poll

2010 Northern Sun Intercollegiate Conference football standings
	Conf.			Overall
Team	W		L	W		L
North Division
No. 1 Minnesota–Duluth $^	10	–	0	15	–	0
No. 12 St. Cloud State ^	9	–	1	10	–	3
Bemidji State	6	–	4	7	–	4
Mary	4	–	6	4	–	7
Minnesota State–Moorhead	2	–	8	2	–	9
Northern State	2	–	8	2	–	9
Minnesota–Crookston	0	–	10	1	–	10
South Division
No. 6 Augustana (SD) ^	9	–	1	11	–	2
Concordia–St. Paul #	7	–	3	8	–	4
Winona State	6	–	4	7	–	4
Minnesota State	5	–	5	6	–	5
Wayne State (NE)	5	–	5	6	–	5
SW Minnesota State	3	–	7	4	–	7
Upper Iowa	2	–	8	2	–	9
$ – Conference champion; ^ – NCAA Division II playoff participant; # – Mineral Water Bowl participant; Rankings from AFCA poll

2010 Rocky Mountain Athletic Conference football standings
	Conf.			Overall
Team	W		L	W		L
No. 23 Nebraska–Kearney +	8	–	1	9	–	2
No. 19 Colorado Mines +^	8	–	1	9	–	3
CSU Pueblo	7	–	2	9	–	2
Chadron State	7	–	2	8	–	3
Adams State	4	–	5	5	–	6
Western New Mexico	3	–	6	4	–	7
Mesa State	3	–	6	3	–	7
Fort Lewis	3	–	6	3	–	7
Western State (CO)	1	–	8	1	–	10
New Mexico Highlands	1	–	8	1	–	10
+ – Conference co-champions; ^ – NCAA Division II playoff participant; Rankings from AFCA poll

2010 Great Lakes Football Conference standings
	Conf.			Overall
Team	W		L	W		L
Saint Joseph's (IN) +	2	–	1	5	–	5
Urbana +	2	–	1	5	–	6
Missouri S&T +	2	–	1	3	–	8
Kentucky Wesleyan	0	–	3	5	–	5
+ – Conference co-champions

2010 NCAA Division II Super Region 3 independents football records
	Conf.			Overall
Team	W		L	W		L
Notre Dame (OH) #		–		2	–	9
Central State		–		1	–	10
# – Provisional Division II member; Rankings from AFCA Poll

=== Super Region 4 ===
2010 Great Northwest Athletic Conference football standings
	Conf.			Overall
Team	W		L	W		L
Central Washington $	7	–	1	8	–	3
Humboldt State	6	–	2	8	–	3
Western Oregon	5	–	3	7	–	4
Dixie State	2	–	6	2	–	8
Simon Fraser #	0	–	8	1	–	9
$ – Conference champion; # – Provisional NCAA Division II member

2010 Lone Star Conference football standings
	Conf.			Overall
Team	W		L	W		L
Overall*
No. 8 Abilene Christian $^	10	–	0	11	–	1
No. 9 Texas A&M–Kingsville ^	9	–	1	10	–	2
No. 18 W. Texas A&M ^	8	–	2	8	–	4
Midwestern State #	7	–	3	8	–	4
Northeastern State	6	–	4	6	–	5
East Central	5	–	5	5	–	6
Angelo State	5	–	5	5	–	5
SW Oklahoma State	4	–	6	4	–	7
Eastern New Mexico †	4	–	6	5	–	6
SE Oklahoma State	3	–	7	3	–	8
Tarleton State	3	–	7	3	–	8
Incarnate Word	3	–	7	3	–	8
Central Oklahoma	2	–	8	2	–	9
Texas A&M–Commerce	2	–	8	3	–	8
North Division
Northeastern State x	5	–	1	6	–	5
East Central x	5	–	1	5	–	6
SW Oklahoma State	4	–	2	4	–	7
Eastern New Mexico †	3	–	3	5	–	6
SE Oklahoma State	2	–	4	3	–	8
Central Oklahoma	1	–	5	2	–	9
Texas A&M–Commerce	1	–	5	3	–	8
South Division
No. 8 Abilene Christian x$^	6	–	0	11	–	1
No. 9 Texas A&M–Kingsville ^	5	–	1	10	–	2
No. 18 W. Texas A&M ^	4	–	2	8	–	4
Midwestern State #	3	–	3	8	–	4
Tarleton State	2	–	4	3	–	8
Angelo State	1	–	5	5	–	5
Incarnate Word	0	–	6	3	–	8
$ – Conference champion; ^ – NCAA Division II playoff participant; * – The LSC counted separate overall and division standings. † – Eastern New Mexico vacated all five wins. # – Kanza Bowl participant; Rankings from AFCA Poll

2010 Mid-America Intercollegiate Athletics Association football standings
	Conf.			Overall
Team	W		L	W		L
No. 3 NW Missouri State $^	9	–	0	12	–	1
No. 5 Central Missouri ^	8	–	1	11	–	3
Washburn #	6	–	3	8	–	4
No. 24 Missouri Western ^	6	–	3	8	–	4
Nebraska–Omaha	5	–	4	5	–	6
Pittsburg State #	3	–	6	6	–	6
Emporia State	3	–	6	5	–	6
Missouri Southern	2	–	7	4	–	7
Truman	2	–	7	4	–	7
Fort Hays State	1	–	8	3	–	8
$ – Conference champion; ^ – NCAA Division II playoff participant; # – bowl game participant (Washburn: Kanza Bowl, Pittsburg State: Mineral Water Bowl; Rankings from AFCA poll

2010 NCAA Division II Super Region 4 independents football records
	Conf.			Overall
Team	W		L	W		L
Southwest Baptist		–		7	–	4
OK Panhandle State		–		6	–	5
Lincoln (MO)		–		2	–	9
Rankings from AFCA Poll

== Conference summaries ==
Conference Champions

Central Intercollegiate Athletic Association – Shaw
Great Lakes Football Conference – Saint Joseph's (IN), Missouri S&T, and Urbana
Great Lakes Intercollegiate Athletic Conference – Grand Valley State
Great Northwest Athletic Conference – Central Washington
Gulf South Conference – Delta State, Henderson State, and Valdosta State
Lone Star Conference – Abilene Christian
Mid-America Intercollegiate Athletic Association – Northwest Missouri State
Northeast-10 Conference – American International, New Haven, and Southern Connecticut State
Northern Sun Intercollegiate Conference – Minnesota–Duluth
Pennsylvania State Athletic Conference – Mercyhurst
Rocky Mountain Athletic Conference – Colorado Mines and Nebraska–Kearney
South Atlantic Conference – Wingate
Southern Intercollegiate Athletic Conference – Albany State
West Virginia Intercollegiate Athletic Conference – Shepherd

== Postseason ==
2010 NCAA Division II Football Championship
- Teams: 24
- Finals Site: Braly Municipal Stadium; Florence, AL
- Champion: Minnesota–Duluth; (2nd title, title game)
- Runner-up: Delta State; (2nd title game)
- Semifinalists: Northwest Missouri State; Shepherd
- Winning coach: championship

The 2010 NCAA Division II Football Championship playoffs were the 37th single-elimination tournament to determine the national champion of men's NCAA Division II college football. The championship game was held at Braly Municipal Stadium in Florence, Alabama for the 23rd time.

=== Seeded teams ===
- Albany State
- Abilene Christian
- Augustana
- Delta State
- Kutztown
- Mercyhurst
- Minnesota–Duluth
- Texas A&M–Kingsville

=== Playoff bracket ===
First Round; November 20; Campus Sites	Second Round; November 27; Campus Sites
1	Minnesota–Duluth*†	20
4	St. Cloud State	17
4	St. Cloud State*	42
5	Hillsdale	28
Super Region 3
2	Augustana (SD) *	38
3	Grand Valley State	6
3	Grand Valley State *	35
6	Colorado Mines	13
1	Abilene Christian*	41
4	Central Missouri	55
4	Central Missouri*	55
5	West Texas A&M	35
Super Region 4
2	Texas A&M–Kingsville*	31
3	NW Missouri State	35
3	NW Missouri State*	28
6	Missouri Western	24
1	Albany State*	30
4	Wingate	28
4	Wingate*	63
5	Morehouse	41
Super Region 2
2	Delta State *	47
6	North Alabama	24
6	North Alabama	43
3	Valdosta State *	20
1	Kutztown *	34
4	Shepherd	41
4	Shepherd *	40
5	Shaw	6
Super Region 1
2	Mercyhurst*	28
6	Bloomsburg	14
6	Bloomsburg	28
3	California (PA)	26

Quarterfinals; December 4 Campus Sites
1	Minnesota–Duluth*	24
2	Augustana (SD)	13
4	Central Missouri	20
3	NW Missouri State*	37
1	Albany State*	7
2	Delta State	28
4	Shepherd	49
2	Mercyhurst*	14

Semifinals; December 11; Campus Sites
1	Minnesota–Duluth*	17
3	NW Missouri State	13
2	Delta State*	29
4	Shepherd	17

National Championship Game; December 18; Braly Municipal Stadium, Florence, Alabama
1	Minnesota–Duluth	20
2	Delta State	17

* Home team † Overtime

== See also ==
- 2010 NCAA Division I FBS football season
- 2010 NCAA Division I FCS football season
- 2010 NCAA Division III football season
- 2010 NAIA football season
