= 2010 NCAA Division II football rankings =

The 2010 NCAA Division II football rankings are from the American Football Coaches Association (AFCA). This is for the 2010 season.

== Legend ==
	Increase in ranking
	Decrease in ranking
	Not ranked previous week
(#–#)	Win–loss record
(Italics)	Number of first place votes
т	Tied with team above or below also with this symbol

== American Football Coaches Association poll ==
	Preseason	Week 1 Aug 31	Week 2 Sept 7	Week 3 Sept 14	Week 4 Sept 21	Week 5 Sept 28	Week 6 Oct 5	Week 7 Oct 12	Week 8 Oct 19	Week 9 Oct 26	Week 10 Nov 2	Week 11 Nov 9	Week 12 Nov 16	Week 13 Postseason	
1.	Northwest Missouri State (22)	Northwest Missouri State (0–0) (23)	Grand Valley State (1–0) (21)	Grand Valley State (2–0) (23)	Grand Valley State (3–0) (19)	Grand Valley State (4–0) (21)	Grand Valley State (5–0) (21)	Grand Valley State (6–0) (20)	Grand Valley State (7–0) (23)	Grand Valley State (8–0) (24)	Minnesota–Duluth (9–0) (24)	Minnesota–Duluth (10–0) (23)	Minnesota–Duluth (11–0) (23)	Minnesota–Duluth (15–0)	1.
2.	Grand Valley State (3)	Grand Valley State (0–0) (1)	Minnesota–Duluth (1–0) (2)	Minnesota–Duluth (2–0) (1)	Minnesota–Duluth (3–0) (4)	Minnesota–Duluth (4–0) (2)	Minnesota–Duluth (5–0) (2)	Minnesota–Duluth (6–0) (4)	Minnesota–Duluth (7–0) (3)	Minnesota–Duluth (8–0) (1)	Abilene Christian (9–0) (2)	Abilene Christian (10–0) (3)	Abilene Christian (11–0) (3)	Delta State (11–4)	2.
3.	North Alabama (1)	Minnesota–Duluth (1–0) (1)	North Alabama (1–0) (3)	North Alabama (2–0) (2)	North Alabama (3–0) (3)	North Alabama (4–0) (3)	North Alabama (5–0) (3)	North Alabama (6–0) (2)	California (PA) (7–0)	Abilene Christian (8–0) (1)	Northwest Missouri State (7–1)	Northwest Missouri State (8–1)	Northwest Missouri State (9–1)	Northwest Missouri State (12–2)	3.
4.	Minnesota–Duluth	North Alabama (0–0) (1)	California (PA) (1–0)	California (PA) (2–0)	California (PA) (3–0)	California (PA) (4–0)	California (PA) (5–0)	California (PA) (6–0)	Abilene Christian (7–0)	Northwest Missouri State (6–1)	Texas A&M–Kingsville (8–1)	Texas A&M–Kingsville (9–1)	Texas A&M–Kingsville (10–1)	Albany State (11–1)	4.
5.	Central Washington	California (PA) (0–0)	Abilene Christian (1–0)	Abilene Christian (2–0)	Abilene Christian (3–0)	Abilene Christian (4–0)	Abilene Christian (5–0)	Abilene Christian (6–0)	Northwest Missouri State (5–1)	Texas A&M–Kingsville (7–1)	Albany State (9–0)	Albany State (10–0)	Albany State (10–0)	Central Missouri (11–3)	5.
6.	California (PA)	Abilene Christian (0–0)	Texas A&M–Kingsville (1–0)	Texas A&M–Kingsville (2–0)	Texas A&M–Kingsville (3–0)	Texas A&M–Kingsville (4–0)	Northwest Missouri State (3–1)	Northwest Missouri State (4–1)	Hillsdale (6–1)	Albany State (8–0)	Central Missouri (9–1)	Grand Valley State (9–1)	Grand Valley State (10–1)	Augustana (SD) (11–2)	6.
7.	Abilene Christian	West Liberty State (0–0)	West Alabama (2–0)	Northwest Missouri State (0–1)	Northwest Missouri State (1–1)	Northwest Missouri State (2–1)	West Texas A&M (4–1)	West Texas A&M (5–1)	Texas A&M–Kingsville (6–1)	Central Missouri (8–1)	Augustana (SD) (9–0)	Valdosta State (8–1)	California (PA) (10–1)	Shepherd (12–2)	7.
8.	West Liberty State	West Texas A&M (0–0)	Northwest Missouri State (0–1)	West Alabama (2–0)	Missouri Western State (3–0)	Missouri Western State (4–0)	Midwestern State (5–0)	Hillsdale (5–1)	Albany State (7–0)	Augustana (SD) (8–0)	Grand Valley State (8–1)	Nebraska–Kearney (9–1)	Central Missouri (9–2)	Abilene Christian (11–1)	8.
9.	Carson–Newman	Washburn (1–0)	West Texas A&M (0–1)	West Texas A&M (1–1)	West Texas A&M (2–1)	West Texas A&M (3–1)	Hillsdale (4–1)	Texas A&M–Kingsville (5–1)	Central Missouri (7–1)	Nebraska–Kearney (7–1)	Nebraska–Kearney (8–1)	Shepherd (9–0)	Augustana (SD) (10–1)	Texas A&M–Kingsville (10–2)	9.
10.	Washburn	West Alabama (1–0)	Tuskegee (1–0)	Tuskegee (2–0)	Midwestern State (3–0)	Midwestern State (4–0)	Texas A&M–Kingsville (4–1)	Albany State (6–0)	North Alabama (6–1)	Valdosta State (6–1)	Valdosta State (7–1)	California (PA) (9–1)	Hillsdale (9–2)	Grand Valley State (11–2)	10.
11.	West Texas A&M	Saginaw Valley State (0–0)	Hillsdale (1–0)	Missouri Western State (2–0)	Minnesota State (3–0)	Hillsdale (3–1)	Albany State (5–0)	Central Missouri (6–1)	Augustana (SD) (7–0)	Shepherd (8–0)	Shepherd (9–0)	Bloomsburg (9–1)	Mercyhurst (9–2)	Mercyhurst (10–3)	11.
12.	West Alabama	Nebraska–Omaha (0–0)	Central Washington (1–1)	Midwestern State (2–0)	Hillsdale (2–1)	Edinboro (4–0)	Central Missouri (5–1)	Delta State (5–1)	Nebraska–Kearney (6–1)	California (PA) (7–1)	California (PA) (8–1)	Central Missouri (9–2)	Wayne State (MI) (9–2)	St. Cloud State (10–3)	12.
13.	Nebraska–Kearney	Central Washington (0–1)	Midwestern State (1–0)	Hillsdale (1–1)	Edinboro (3–0)	Tusculum (4–0)	Delta State (4–1)	Nebraska–Kearney (5–1)	Midwestern State (6–1)	Bloomsburg (7–1)	Bloomsburg (8–1)	Hillsdale (8–2)	Kutztown (10–1)	Kutztown (10–2)	13.
14.	Saginaw Valley State	Texas A&M–Kingsville (0–0)	Missouri Western State (1–0)	UNC Pembroke (2–0)	Carson–Newman (2–1)	Albany State (4–0)	Nebraska–Kearney (4–1)	Augustana (SD) (6–0)	Valdosta State (5–1)	West Texas A&M (6–2)	West Texas A&M (7–2)	Augustana (SD) (9–1)	West Texas A&M (8–3)	California (PA) (10–2)	14.
15.	Nebraska–Omaha	Tuskegee (0–0)	Washburn (1–1)	Washburn (1–1)	Tusculum (4–0)	West Alabama (3–1)	Augustana (SD) (5–0)	Midwestern State (5–1)	Shepherd (7–0)	Kutztown (8–0)	Kutztown (9–0)	North Alabama (8–2)	St. Cloud State (9–2)	Bloomsburg (10–3)	15.
16.	Texas A&M–Kingsville	Hillsdale (0–0)	Saginaw Valley State (0–1)	Minnesota State (2–0)	Albany State (3–0)	Central Missouri (4–1)	Morehouse (5–0)	Tuskegee (5–1)	Bloomsburg (6–1)	Colorado Mines (7–1)	Colorado Mines (8–1)	Mercyhurst (8–2)	Colorado Mines (9–2)	Hillsdale (9–3)	16.
17.	Tuskegee	Midwestern State (0–0)	UNC Pembroke (1–0)	Winona State (2–0)	West Alabama (2–1)	Nebraska–Kearney (3–1)	Winston–Salem State (6–0)	Missouri Western State (5–1)	West Texas A&M (5–2)	Hillsdale (6–2)	Hillsdale (7–2)	Wayne State (MI) (8–2)	Valdosta State (8–2)	Valdosta State (8–3)	17.
18.	Hillsdale	Minnesota State (0–0)	Minnesota State (1–0)	Wayne State (NE) (2–0)	West Liberty State (1–1)	Morehouse (5–0)	Tuskegee (4–1)	Shepherd (6–0)	Kutztown (7–0)	Winston–Salem State (8–1)	North Alabama (7–2)	St. Cloud State (8–2)	Shepherd (9–1)	West Texas A&M (8–4)	18.
19.	Midwestern State	Missouri Western State (0–0)	Winona State (1–0)	Carson–Newman (1–1)	Nebraska–Kearney (2–1)	Delta State (3–1)	Missouri Western State (4–1)	Valdosta State (4–1)	Morehouse (6–1)	Delta State (6–2)	Midwestern State (7–2)	West Texas A&M (7–3)	Nebraska–Kearney (9–2)	Colorado Mines (9–3)	19.
20.	Missouri Western State	Carson–Newman (0–1)	Carson–Newman (1–1)	Valdosta State (2–0)	Morehouse (4–0)	Augustana (SD) (4–0)	UNC Pembroke (4–1)	Bloomsburg (5–1)	Colorado Mines (6–1)	St. Cloud State (7–1)	St. Augustine's (8–1)	Kutztown (9–1)	Bloomsburg (9–2)	Wingate (9–3)	20.
21.	Minnesota State	West Chester (0–0)	West Liberty State (0–1)	West Liberty State (1–1)	Central Missouri (3–1)	Central Washington (3–2)	Shepherd (5–0)	West Virginia Wesleyan (6–0)	Winston–Salem State (7–1)	North Alabama (6–2)	Mercyhurst (7–2)	Colorado Mines (8–2)	Michigan Tech (8–2)	Wayne State (MI) (9–2)	21.
22.	West Chester	Delta State (0–0)	Wayne State (NE) (1–0)	Edinboro (2–0)	Central Washington (2–2)	Tuskegee (3–1)	Valdosta State (4–1)	Morehouse (5–1)	Delta State (5–2)	Midwestern State (6–2)	Fort Valley State (8–1)	Michigan Tech (7–2)	Fort Valley State (8–2)	North Alabama (9–4)	22.
23.	UNC Pembroke	UNC Pembroke (0–0)	Nebraska–Kearney (1–1)	Nebraska–Kearney (1–1)	Delta State (2–1)	Winston–Salem State (5–0)	Tusculum (4–1)	Kutztown (6–0)	St. Cloud State (6–1)	St. Augustine's (7–1)	New Haven (8–1)	Fort Valley State (8–2)	Morehouse (8–2)	Nebraska–Kearney (9–2)	23.
24.	Delta State	Winona State (1–0)	Edinboro (1–0)	Tusculum (3–0)	Augustana (SD) (3–0)	UNC Pembroke (3–1)	Edinboro (4–1)	Colorado Mines (5–1)	St. Augustine's (6–1)	Mercyhurst (6–2)	Wayne State (MI) (7–2)	Morehouse (8–2)	Midwestern State (8–3)	Missouri Western State (8–4)	24.
25.	East Stroudsburg	Wayne State (NE) (1–0)	East Stroudsburg (1–0)	Central Washington (1–2)	Tuskegee (2–1)	Minnesota State (3–1)	CSU Pueblo (5–0)	Winston–Salem State (6–1)	West Virginia Wesleyan (6–1)	Fort Valley State (7–1)	St. Cloud State (7–2)	Midwestern State (7–3)	Shaw (9–2)	Michigan Tech (8–2)	25.
	Preseason	Week 1 Aug 31	Week 2 Sept 7	Week 3 Sept 14	Week 4 Sept 21	Week 5 Sept 28	Week 6 Oct 5	Week 7 Oct 12	Week 8 Oct 19	Week 9 Oct 26	Week 10 Nov 2	Week 11 Nov 9	Week 12 Nov 16	Week 13 Postseason	
		Dropped: 13 Nebraska–Kearney; 25 East Stroudsburg	Dropped: 12 Nebraska–Omaha; 21 West Chester; 22 Delta State	Dropped: 16 Saginaw Valley State; 25 East Stroudsburg	Dropped: 14 UNC Pembroke; 15 Washburn; 17 Winona State; 18 Wayne State (NE); 20 Valdosta State	Dropped: 14 Carson–Newman; 18 West Liberty State	Dropped: 15 West Alabama; 21 Central Washington; 25 Minnesota State	Dropped: 20 UNC Pembroke; 23 Tusculum; 24 Edinboro; 25 Colorado State University–Pueblo	Dropped: 16 Tuskegee; 17 Missouri Western State	Dropped: 19 Morehouse; 25 West Virginia Wesleyan	Dropped: 18 Winston–Salem State; 19 Delta State	Dropped: 20 St. Augustine's; 23 New Haven	Dropped: 15 North Alabama	Dropped: 22 Fort Valley State; 23 Morehouse; 24 Midwestern State; 25 Shaw	
