= Ragan-Brown Field House =

Arena in Greensboro, North Carolina

- Interactive map of Ragan-Brown Field House
- Location: Greensboro, North Carolina
- Coordinates: 36°5′40″N 79°53′8″W
- Owner: Guilford College
- Operator: Guilford College
- Capacity: 2,500
- Surface: Maple

Construction
- Built: 1980
- Opened: 1980

Tenants
- Guilford College men's and women's basketball Guilford College women's volleyball

Ragan-Brown Field House is a 2,500-seat multi-purpose arena located on the campus of Guilford College in Greensboro, North Carolina known for its distinctive cathedral-like wooden ceiling.

The arena is named in honor of Herbert and Elizabeth Ragan and Edwin and Dorothy Brown and was dedicated in 1980. In 2003 the arena underwent a substantial renovation project and currently serves as the home for the Guilford Quakers basketball and volleyball programs.
