= Brevard Memorial Stadium =

Sports stadium in North Carolina

- Interactive map of Brevard Memorial Stadium
- Full name: Brevard Memorial Stadium
- Location: Brevard, NC
- Coordinates: 35°14′11″N 82°43′29″W
- Owner: Brevard High School
- Capacity: 7,000
- Surface: Shaw Sports Turf Momentum 41 (artificial)

Tenants
- Brevard High Blue Devils; Brevard College Tornados

Brevard Memorial Stadium is a 7,000-seat football stadium located in Brevard, North Carolina. The stadium is the home field of the Brevard High School Blue Devils and the Brevard College Tornados. The Tornados compete in the National Collegiate Athletic Association (NCAA) Division II South Atlantic Conference (SAC). The school installed an artificial turf field in 2014.
